= 2025–26 Women's EHF European Cup =

European handball cup competition

EHF European Cup Women
- 2025–26

Tournament information
- Sport: Handball
- Dates: 26 September 2025–May 2026
- Teams: 57
- Website: ehfec.com

Final positions
- Champions: (Spain) CB Atlético Guardés
- Runner-up: (Slovakia) IUVENTA Michalovce

The 2025–26 Women's EHF European Cup was the 33rd season of Europe's tertiary club handball tournament organised by the European Handball Federation (EHF), and the 6th season since it was renamed from the Challenge Cup to the EHF European Cup.

The defending champions were Valur, who won their first title in the previous season. Valur did not defend their title due to their involvement in this season's European League.

CB Atlético Guardés won their first title after beating IUVENTA Michalovce in the final.

== Format ==
The tournament was played in a straight knockout format. The ties are held in a home and away format. Overall, there are six rounds to navigate in order to win the trophy (Round 2, Round 3, Last 16, Quarterfinals, Semifinals and Final).

== Rankings ==
The rankings are based on the performances of each club from a respective country from a three year period.

Rank	Association	Average points	Teams
1	Spain	64.00	4
2	Slovakia	40.67	3
3	Turkey	36.33	3
4	Portugal	25.67	3
5	Serbia	18.33	2
6	North Macedonia	17.67	4
7	Netherlands	17.33	3
8	Ukraine	16.33	1
9	Czech Republic	15.67	1
10	Faroe Islands	15.67	1
11	Croatia	15.00	1
12	Israel	13.33	2
13	Iceland	13.33	2
14	Italy	11.67	2
15	Switzerland	11.00	1
16	Greece	10.33	4

Rank	Association	Average points	Teams
17	Belarus	10.00	0
18	Poland	8.67	2
19	Montenegro	8.00	0
20	Sweden	8.00	0
21	Slovenia	6.33	2
22	Bosnia and Herzegovina	5.67	2
23	Austria	4.33	2
24	Kosovo	3.33	4
25	Luxembourg	3.33	3
26	Malta	2.33	0
27	Azerbaijan	2.33	2
28	Belgium	2.00	0
29	Lithuania	2.00	1
30	Finland	1.33	0
31	Cyprus	1.00	1
32	Bulgaria	1.00	1
N/A	(N/A) Everyone else	0.00	0

== Qualified teams ==
The full list of teams qualified for each stage of the 2025–26 Women's EHF European Cup was announced on 8 July 2025.

The labels in the parentheses show how each team qualified for the place of its starting round:

- EC: European Cup title holders
- CW: Cup winners
- CR: Cup runners-up
- 4th, 5th, etc.: League position of the previous season
  - SF: Semi-final league position
  - QF: Quarter-final league position

Round 3
(Czech Republic) Házená Kynžvart (3rd)	(Iceland) Haukar (2nd)	(North Macedonia) WHC Gjorche Petrov (1st)	(Portugal) Madeira Andebol SAD (2nd)
(Slovakia) IUVENTA Michalovce (2nd)	(Spain) CB Atlético Guardés (3rd)	(Turkey) Bursa Büyükşehir BSK (3rd)	

Round 2
(Austria) WAT Atzgersdorf (2nd)	(Austria) Union Korneuburg (5th)	(Azerbaijan) Azeryol HC	(Azerbaijan) Kur
(Bosnia and Herzegovina) OŽRK Krajina Cazin	(Bosnia and Herzegovina) ŽRK Krivaja	(Bulgaria) HC Byala	(Croatia) ŽRK Split 2010
(Cyprus) Cyview Developers Latsia	(Faroe Islands) H71	(Greece) AEK Athens HC	(Greece) AEP Panorama
(Greece) Anagennisi Artas	(Greece) A.C. PAOK	(Iceland) Selfoss (5th)	(Israel) Holon Yuvalim HC
(Israel) Maccabi Arazim Ramat Gan	(Italy) Jomi Salerno (1st)	(Italy) Handball Erice (2nd)	(Kosovo) KHF Ferizaj
(Kosovo) KHF Istogu	(Kosovo) KHF Samadrexha	(Kosovo) KHF Shqiponja	(Lithuania) HC SM Garliava
(Luxembourg) Handball Käerjeng	(Luxembourg) HB Dudelange	(Luxembourg) Red Boys Differdange	(Netherlands) Westfriesland SEW (2nd)
(Netherlands) Cabooter Fortes Venlo (3rd)	(Netherlands) H.V. Quintus (5th)	(North Macedonia) WHC Cair Skopje	(North Macedonia) WHC Kumanovo
(North Macedonia) WHC Metalurg Avtokomanda	(Poland) KPR Kobierzyce (3rd)	(Poland) Energa Start Elbląg (4th)	(Portugal) ADAA São Pedro do Sul (3rd)
(Portugal) ABC De Braga (4th)	(Serbia) ŽRK Železničar Inđija (2nd)	(Serbia) ŽORK Bor (4th)	(Slovakia) HC DAC Dunajská Streda
(Slovakia) HK Slovan Duslo Šaľa	(Slovenia) ŽRK Mlinotest Ajdovščina (2nd)	(Slovenia) ŽRD Litija (4th)	(Spain) Atticgo BM Elche (2nd)
(Spain) Costa del Sol Málaga (4th)	(Spain) Replasa Beti-Onak (9th, CR)	(Switzerland) Yellow Winterthur (3rd)	(Turkey) Üsküdar BSK (4th)
(Turkey) Trabzon Ortahisar BSK (5th)	(Ukraine) HC Galychanka		

== Qualifying rounds ==
=== Round 2 ===
A total of 50 teams played in the second round. First leg matches were held on 27 and 28 September 2025, while second leg matches took place on 4 and 5 October 2025. The draw took place on 15 July 2025.

Team 1	Agg.	Team 2	1st leg	2nd leg
Handball Erice (Italy)	83–54	(Serbia) ŽRK Železničar Inđija	46–25	37–29
Cabooter Fortes Venlo (Netherlands)	40–39	(Faroe Islands) H71	–	40–39
Energa Start Elbląg (Poland)	68–62	(Turkey) Trabzon Ortahisar BSK	39–32	29–30
HC SM Garliava (Lithuania)	63–57	(North Macedonia) WHC Kumanovo	32–25	31–32
KPR Kobierzyce (Poland)	65–63	(Turkey) Üsküdar BSK	31–32	34–31
AEK Athens HC (Greece)	56–53	(Iceland) Selfoss	32–26	24–27
Replasa Beti-Onak (Spain)	52–49	(Ukraine) HC Galychanka	26–25	26–24
WAT Atzgersdorf (Austria)	80–39	(Israel) Holon Yuvalim HC	39–20	41–19
ŽRK Mlinotest Ajdovščina (Slovenia)	60–51	(North Macedonia) WHC Cair Skopje	27–24	33–27
Westfriesland SEW (Netherlands)	51–48	(Portugal) ABC De Braga	28–26	23–22
ŽRD Litija (Slovenia)	55–66	(Bulgaria) HC Byala	28–27	27–39
ŽRK Krivaja (Bosnia and Herzegovina)	56–83	(Slovakia) HK Slovan Duslo Šaľa	27–36	29–47
Atticgo BM Elche (Spain)	55–51	(Slovakia) HC DAC Dunajská Streda	31–21	24–30
Yellow Winterthur (Switzerland)	86–52	(Kosovo) KHF Shqiponja	38–23	48–29
ŽRK Split 2010 (Croatia)	63–57	(Bosnia and Herzegovina) OŽRK Krajina Cazin	37–29	26–28
HB Dudelange (Luxembourg)	25–79	(Spain) Costa del Sol Málaga	14–42	11–37
WHC Metalurg Avtokomanda (North Macedonia)	71–49	(Luxembourg) Red Boys Differdange	40–25	31–24
ADAA São Pedro do Sul (Portugal)	57–49	(Azerbaijan) Kur	26–26	31–23
Handball Käerjeng (Luxembourg)	50–49	(Greece) Anagennisi Artas	24–19	26–30
KHF Ferizaj (Kosovo)	39–83	(Italy) Jomi Salerno	20–39	19–44
A.C. PAOK (Greece)	72–48	(Kosovo) KHF Samadrexha	38–28	34–20
AEP Panorama (Greece)	59–67	(Kosovo) KHF Istogu	31–39	28–28
H.V. Quintus (Netherlands)	84–18	(Cyprus) Cyview Developers Latsia	41–12	43–6
Azeryol HC (Azerbaijan)	55–73	(Austria) Union Korneuburg	26–40	29–33
Maccabi Arazim Ramat Gan (Israel)	47–56	(Serbia) ŽORK Bor	21–24	26–32

=== Round 3 ===
A total of 32 teams played in the second round. First leg matches were held on 8 and 9 November 2025, while second leg matches took place on 15 and 16 November 2025. The draw took place on 7 October 2025.

Team 1	Agg.	Team 2	1st leg	2nd leg
Handball Erice (Italy)	68–30	(Luxembourg) Handball Käerjeng	36–13	32–17
Atticgo BM Elche (Spain)	44–35	(North Macedonia) WHC Gjorche Petrov	19–16	25–19
HC Byala (Bulgaria)	43–84	(Spain) CB Atlético Guardés	19–45	24–39
HC SM Garliava (Lithuania)	42–70	(Netherlands) Cabooter Fortes Venlo	22–28	20–42
KPR Kobierzyce (Poland)	56–48	(Portugal) ADAA São Pedro do Sul	33–19	23–29
HK Slovan Duslo Šaľa (Slovakia)	66–67	(Serbia) ŽORK Bor	35–31	31–36
ŽRK Split 2010 (Croatia)	50–49	(North Macedonia) WHC Metalurg Avtokomanda	24–24	26–25
Westfriesland SEW (Netherlands)	46–51	(Slovenia) ŽRK Mlinotest Ajdovščina	27–27	19–24
WAT Atzgersdorf (Austria)	53–62	(Greece) A.C. PAOK	28–35	25–27
Energa Start Elbląg (Poland)	58–59	(Italy) Jomi Salerno	26–26	32–33
Haukar (Iceland)	37–63	(Spain) Costa del Sol Málaga	18–36	19–27
Bursa Büyükşehir BSK (Turkey)	67–58	(Greece) AEK Athens HC	37–29	30–29
Union Korneuburg (Austria)	47–85	(Czech Republic) Házená Kynžvart	24–40	23–45
Madeira Andebol SAD (Portugal)	74–37	(Kosovo) KHF Istogu	40–17	34–20
H.V. Quintus (Netherlands)	50–79	(Slovakia) IUVENTA Michalovce	33–38	17–41
Replasa Beti-Onak (Spain)	57–51	(Switzerland) Yellow Winterthur	30–26	27–25

== Last 16 ==
First leg matches were held on 17 and 18 January 2026, while second leg matches took place on 24 and 25 January 2026. The draw took place on 18 November 2025.

Team 1	Agg.	Team 2	1st leg	2nd leg
KPR Kobierzyce (Poland)	43–55	(Spain) Atticgo BM Elche	22–28	21–27
Replasa Beti-Onak (Spain)	52–57	(Turkey) Bursa Büyükşehir BSK	24–25	28–32
ŽRK Mlinotest Ajdovščina (Slovenia)	57–60	(Netherlands) Cabooter Fortes Venlo	28–27	29–33
CB Atlético Guardés (Spain)	55–41	(Italy) Handball Erice	25–22	30–19
A.C. PAOK (Greece)	56–46	(Portugal) Madeira Andebol SAD	37–26	19–20
Házená Kynžvart (Czech Republic)	62–60	(Italy) Jomi Salerno	33–28	29–32
Costa del Sol Málaga (Spain)	46–38	(Serbia) ŽORK Bor	24–21	22–17
IUVENTA Michalovce (Slovakia)	65–58	(Croatia) ŽRK Split 2010	35–29	30–29

== Quarterfinals ==
First leg matches were mostly held on 21 and 22 March 2026, while the second leg matches took place on 28 and 29 March 2026. The draw took place on 31 January 2026.

Team 1	Agg.	Team 2	1st leg	2nd leg
CB Atlético Guardés (Spain)	41–40	(Spain) Atticgo BM Elche	21–20	20–20
Bursa Büyükşehir BSK (Turkey)	65–64	(Greece) A.C. PAOK	36–30	29–34
Cabooter Fortes Venlo (Netherlands)	47–60	(Slovakia) IUVENTA Michalovce	23–31	24–29
Costa del Sol Málaga (Spain)	56–38	(Czech Republic) Házená Kynžvart	33–18	23–20

=== Matches ===
21 March 2026; 19:00	CB Atlético Guardés (Spain)	21–20	(Spain) Atticgo BM Elche	Pabellón Municipal de A Sangriña, A Guarda; Attendance: 400; Referees: L. Hardegger, S. Hardegger (SUI)
21 March 2026; 19:00	Cacheda, Sancha 5	(10–6)	Figueiredo 6	Pabellón Municipal de A Sangriña, A Guarda; Attendance: 400; Referees: L. Hardegger, S. Hardegger (SUI)
21 March 2026; 19:00		Report	1× (yellow card) 4× (suspension)	Pabellón Municipal de A Sangriña, A Guarda; Attendance: 400; Referees: L. Hardegger, S. Hardegger (SUI)

28 March 2026; 19:00	Atticgo BM Elche (Spain)	20–20	(Spain) CB Atlético Guardés	Pabellón Municipal Esperanza Lag, Elche; Referees: Fahner, Kubis (POL)
28 March 2026; 19:00		(10–8)		Pabellón Municipal Esperanza Lag, Elche; Referees: Fahner, Kubis (POL)
28 March 2026; 19:00		Report		Pabellón Municipal Esperanza Lag, Elche; Referees: Fahner, Kubis (POL)

22 March 2026; 15:00	Bursa Büyükşehir BSK (Turkey)	36–30	(Greece) A.C. PAOK	Nilüfer Belediye Spor Tesisleri, Nilüfer, Bursa; Attendance: 255; Referees: Dasic, Husomanovic (NED)
22 March 2026; 15:00	Ikhneva 7	(19–14)	Andritsou 9	Nilüfer Belediye Spor Tesisleri, Nilüfer, Bursa; Attendance: 255; Referees: Dasic, Husomanovic (NED)
22 March 2026; 15:00	3× (suspension)	Report	5× (suspension)	Nilüfer Belediye Spor Tesisleri, Nilüfer, Bursa; Attendance: 255; Referees: Dasic, Husomanovic (NED)

28 March 2026; 17:30	A.C. PAOK (Greece)	34–29	(Turkey) Bursa Büyükşehir BSK	Mikra Indoor Arena III, Thessaloniki; Attendance: 1,000; Referees: Berdic, Sorak (SRB)
28 March 2026; 17:30		(15–11)		Mikra Indoor Arena III, Thessaloniki; Attendance: 1,000; Referees: Berdic, Sorak (SRB)
28 March 2026; 17:30		Report		Mikra Indoor Arena III, Thessaloniki; Attendance: 1,000; Referees: Berdic, Sorak (SRB)

27 March 2026; 17:00	Cabooter Fortes Venlo (Netherlands)	23–31	(Slovakia) IUVENTA Michalovce	Chemkostav Arena, Michalovce; Attendance: 400; Referees: Danilovic, Karan (BIH)
27 March 2026; 17:00	Marsman 7	(14–14)	Kowalik 8	Chemkostav Arena, Michalovce; Attendance: 400; Referees: Danilovic, Karan (BIH)
27 March 2026; 17:00	3× (suspension)	Report	3× (suspension)	Chemkostav Arena, Michalovce; Attendance: 400; Referees: Danilovic, Karan (BIH)

29 March 2026; 15:30	IUVENTA Michalovce (Slovakia)	29–24	(Netherlands) Cabooter Fortes Venlo	Chemkostav Arena, Michalovce; Referees: Danilovic, Karan (BIH)
29 March 2026; 15:30	Kompaniiets 5	(15–13)	Marsman 5	Chemkostav Arena, Michalovce; Referees: Danilovic, Karan (BIH)
29 March 2026; 15:30	2× (suspension)	Report	2× (suspension)	Chemkostav Arena, Michalovce; Referees: Danilovic, Karan (BIH)

27 March 2026; 19:00	Costa del Sol Málaga (Spain)	33–18	(Czech Republic) Házená Kynžvart	Pabellón José Luis Pérez Canca, Málaga; Attendance: 726; Referees: Kyriakou, Grapsas (GRE)
27 March 2026; 19:00	Dos Santos Medeiros 8	(16–12)	Vávrová 6	Pabellón José Luis Pérez Canca, Málaga; Attendance: 726; Referees: Kyriakou, Grapsas (GRE)
27 March 2026; 19:00	2× (suspension)	Report	2× (suspension)	Pabellón José Luis Pérez Canca, Málaga; Attendance: 726; Referees: Kyriakou, Grapsas (GRE)

29 March 2026; 12:00	Házená Kynžvart (Czech Republic)	20–23	(Spain) Costa del Sol Málaga	Pabellón José Luis Pérez Canca, Málaga; Attendance: 358; Referees: Kyriakou, Grapsas (GRE)
29 March 2026; 12:00	Michalcová 6	(10–13)	Piñeira Calero 8	Pabellón José Luis Pérez Canca, Málaga; Attendance: 358; Referees: Kyriakou, Grapsas (GRE)
29 March 2026; 12:00	6× (suspension)	Report	1× (yellow card) 2× (suspension)	Pabellón José Luis Pérez Canca, Málaga; Attendance: 358; Referees: Kyriakou, Grapsas (GRE)

== Semifinals ==
Team 1	Agg.	Team 2	1st leg	2nd leg
Costa del Sol Málaga (Spain)	47–52	(Spain) CB Atlético Guardés	24–26	23–26
Bursa Büyükşehir BSK (Turkey)	53–54	(Slovakia) IUVENTA Michalovce	34–29	19–25

=== Matches ===
19 April 2026; 12:00	Costa del Sol Málaga (Spain)	24–26	(Spain) CB Atlético Guardés	Pabellón José Luis Pérez Canca, Malaga; Attendance: 926; Referees: Cournil, Lamour (FRA)
19 April 2026; 12:00	Campigli Rodriguez, Medeiros 5	(11–12)	Sancha 8	Pabellón José Luis Pérez Canca, Malaga; Attendance: 926; Referees: Cournil, Lamour (FRA)
19 April 2026; 12:00	1× (yellow card) 1× (suspension)	Report	2× (suspension)	Pabellón José Luis Pérez Canca, Malaga; Attendance: 926; Referees: Cournil, Lamour (FRA)

25 April 2026; 20:30	(Spain) CB Atlético Guardés	26–23	(Spain) Costa del Sol Málaga	Pabellón Municipal de A Sangriña, A Guarda; Attendance: 750; Referees: Marton, Dane (HUN)
25 April 2026; 20:30	Sancha 7	(14–11)	Medeiros 6	Pabellón Municipal de A Sangriña, A Guarda; Attendance: 750; Referees: Marton, Dane (HUN)
25 April 2026; 20:30	2× (suspension)	Report	5× (suspension)	Pabellón Municipal de A Sangriña, A Guarda; Attendance: 750; Referees: Marton, Dane (HUN)

CB Atlético Guardés won 52–47 on aggregate

19 April 2026; 16:00	Bursa Büyükşehir BSK (Turkey)	34–29	(Slovakia) IUVENTA Michalovce	Nilüfer Belediye Spor Tesisleri, Nilüfer, Bursa; Attendance: 353; Referees: Riello, Panetta (ITA)
19 April 2026; 16:00	Gökdemir 8	(17–15)	Sabovová 7	Nilüfer Belediye Spor Tesisleri, Nilüfer, Bursa; Attendance: 353; Referees: Riello, Panetta (ITA)
19 April 2026; 16:00	2× (suspension)	Report	3× (suspension)	Nilüfer Belediye Spor Tesisleri, Nilüfer, Bursa; Attendance: 353; Referees: Riello, Panetta (ITA)

26 April 2026; 17:30	IUVENTA Michalovce (Slovakia)	25–19	(Turkey) Bursa Büyükşehir BSK	Chemkostav Arena, Michalovce; Attendance: 720; Referees: Fält, Holm (SWE)
26 April 2026; 17:30	Sabovová 7	(10–6)	Özel 6	Chemkostav Arena, Michalovce; Attendance: 720; Referees: Fält, Holm (SWE)
26 April 2026; 17:30	1× (yellow card) 3× (suspension)	Report	1× (yellow card) 2× (suspension)	Chemkostav Arena, Michalovce; Attendance: 720; Referees: Fält, Holm (SWE)

IUVENTA Michalovce won 54–53 on aggregate

== Final ==
The first leg match was held on 17 May 2026, while the second leg match will be held on 24 May 2026.

Team 1	Agg.	Team 2	1st leg	2nd leg
IUVENTA Michalovce (Slovakia)	44–53	(Spain) CB Atlético Guardés	20–24	24–29

=== Matches ===
17 May 2026; 16:00	IUVENTA Michalovce (Slovakia)	20–24	(Spain) CB Atlético Guardés	Chemkostav Arena, Michalovce; Attendance: 1,400; Referees: Murariu, Chiruta (ROU)
17 May 2026; 16:00	Bieger 6	(11–12)	Mendoza 6	Chemkostav Arena, Michalovce; Attendance: 1,400; Referees: Murariu, Chiruta (ROU)
17 May 2026; 16:00	5× (suspension) 1× (red card)	Report	1× (suspension)	Chemkostav Arena, Michalovce; Attendance: 1,400; Referees: Murariu, Chiruta (ROU)

24 May 2026; 19:00	CB Atlético Guardés (Spain)	29–24	(Slovakia) IUVENTA Michalovce	Pabellón Municipal de A Sangriña, A Guarda; Attendance: 1,300; Referees: Nygaard, Primdahl (DEN)
24 May 2026; 19:00	Hauptman, Sancha 4	(14–8)	Bieger 6	Pabellón Municipal de A Sangriña, A Guarda; Attendance: 1,300; Referees: Nygaard, Primdahl (DEN)
24 May 2026; 19:00	2× (suspension)	Report	2× (yellow card) 4× (suspension) 1× (red card)	Pabellón Municipal de A Sangriña, A Guarda; Attendance: 1,300; Referees: Nygaard, Primdahl (DEN)

CB Atlético Guardés won 53–44 on aggregate

== See also ==
- 2025–26 EHF Champions League
- 2025–26 EHF European League
- 2025–26 Women's EHF Champions League
- 2025–26 Women's EHF European League
- 2025–26 EHF European Cup
