= 2015–16 Women's EHF Challenge Cup =

Women's EHF Challenge Cup
- 2015–16

Tournament information
- Sport: Handball
- Dates: 14 November 2015–7 May 2016
- Administrator: European Handball Federation

Final positions
- Champions: (Spain) Gran Canaria
- Runner-up: (Turkey) Kastamonu Bld. GSK

The 2015–16 Women's EHF Challenge Cup was the 19th edition of the European Handball Federation's fourth-tier competition for women's handball clubs, running from 14 November 2015.

== Round and draw dates ==
All draws held at the European Handball Federation headquarters in Vienna, Austria.

Round	Draw date	First leg	Second leg
Round 3	22 July 2014	14–21 November 2015	15–22 November 2015
Last 16	25 November 2015	8–15 January 2016	9–17 January 2016
Quarter-final		20–22 February 2016	21–28 February 2016
Semi-finals		2–3 April 2016	9–10 April 2016
Final			

== Qualification stage ==
=== Round 3 ===
Teams listed first played the first leg at home. Some teams agreed to play both matches in the same venue. Bolded teams qualified into last 16.

Team 1	Agg.	Team 2	1st leg	2nd leg
IBV Vestmannaeyjar (Iceland)	56–61^{a}	(Serbia) ŽRK Izvor Bukovička Banja	28–30	28–31
ŽRK Danilovgrad (Montenegro)	42–52	(Slovenia) **ŽRK Mlinotest Ajdovščina**	24–30	18–22
**Colégio de Gaia** (Portugal)	68–58^{b}	(Finland) HIFK	36–29	32–29
ŽRK Pelister (North Macedonia)	57–77	(Kosovo) **KHF Shqiponja**	22–38	35–39
**Izmir BB GSK** (Turkey)	54–40	(Switzerland) DHB Rotweiss Thun	27–17	27–23
**Metraco Zagłębie Lubin** (Poland)	78–29^{c}	(Israel) Maccabi Arazim Ramat Gan	41–12	37–17
ABU Baku (Azerbaijan)	41–56^{d}	(Netherlands) **Schuler Afbouwgroep/DOS**	19–27	22–29
**Yellow Winterthur** (Switzerland)	59–40	(Italy) ASD Ariosta P. Ferrara	34–21	25–19
**HC Vardar SCJS** (North Macedonia)	62–31^{e}	(United Kingdom) London Angels HC	27–14	35–17

Notes

^{a} Both legs were hosted by ŽRK Aranđelovac.
^{b} Both legs were hosted by HIFK.
^{c} Both legs were hosted by Metraco Zaglebie Lubin.
^{d} Both legs were hosted by Schuler Afbouwgroep/DOS.
^{e} Both legs were hosted by HC Vardar junior.

== Last 16 ==
Teams listed first played the first leg at home. Some teams agreed to play both matches in the same venue. Bolded teams qualified into quarterfinals.

Team 1	Agg.	Team 2	1st leg	2nd leg
**Kastamonu Bld. GSK** (Turkey)	73–63^{a}	(Poland) Metraco Zagłębie Lubin	43–39	30–24
Schuler Afbouwgroep (Netherlands)	45–60^{b}	(Serbia) **ŽRK Izvor Bukovička Banja**	27–33	18–27
KHF Shqiponja (Kosovo)	54–94	(Spain) **Gran Canaria**	23–38	31–56
Yellow Winterthur (Switzerland)	29–70	(Netherlands) **Virto/Quintus**	13–37	16–33
**EKS Start Elblag** (Poland)	54–44	(Slovenia) ŽRK Mlinotest Ajdovščina	28–22	26–22
**HC Vardar SCJS** (North Macedonia)	57–51	(Serbia) Minaqua Vojvodina	26–24	31–27
DHC Sokol Poruba (Czech Republic)	45–45	(Turkey) **Izmir BB GSK**	28–22	17–23
Colégio de Gaia (Portugal)	35–53^{c}	(Ukraine) **HC Karpaty**	14–23	21–30

Notes
^{a} Both legs were hosted by Kastamonu Bld. GSK.
^{b} Both legs were hosted by Schuler Afbouwgroep.
^{c} Both legs were hosted by Colegio de Gaia.

=== Quarterfinals ===
Teams listed first played the first leg at home. Some teams agreed to play both matches in the same venue. Teams listed first played the first leg at home. Bolded teams qualified for the semifinals.

Team 1	Agg.	Team 2	1st leg	2nd leg
HC Vardar SCJS (North Macedonia)	39–47	(Ukraine) **HC Karpaty**	22–19	17–28
**EKS Start Elblag** (Poland)	48–46	(Turkey) Izmir BB SK	29–25	19–21
**Gran Canaria** (Spain)	62–44^{a}	(Serbia) ŽRK Izvor Bukovička Banja	35–25	27–19
**Kastamonu Bld. GSK** (Turkey)	52–46^{b}	(Netherlands) Virto/Quintus	27–23	25–23

Notes
^{a} Both legs were hosted by Gran Canaria.
^{b} Both legs were hosted by Kastamonu Bld. GSK.

=== Semifinals ===
Team 1	Agg.	Team 2	1st leg	2nd leg
**Kastamonu Bld. GSK** (Turkey)	54–45	(Ukraine) HC Karpaty	24–20	30–25
EKS Start Elblag (Poland)	46–47	(Spain) **Gran Canaria**	24–25	22–22

=== Final ===
Team listed first played the first leg at home.

Team 1	Agg.	Team 2	1st leg	2nd leg
Kastamonu Bld. GSK (Turkey)	54–62	(Spain) **Gran Canaria**	25–29	29–33

== See also ==
- 2015–16 Women's EHF Champions League
- 2015–16 Women's EHF Cup Winners' Cup
- 2015–16 Women's EHF Cup
