= Perihan Topaloğlu =

Turkish handball player (born 1987)

Perihan Topaloğlu Acar
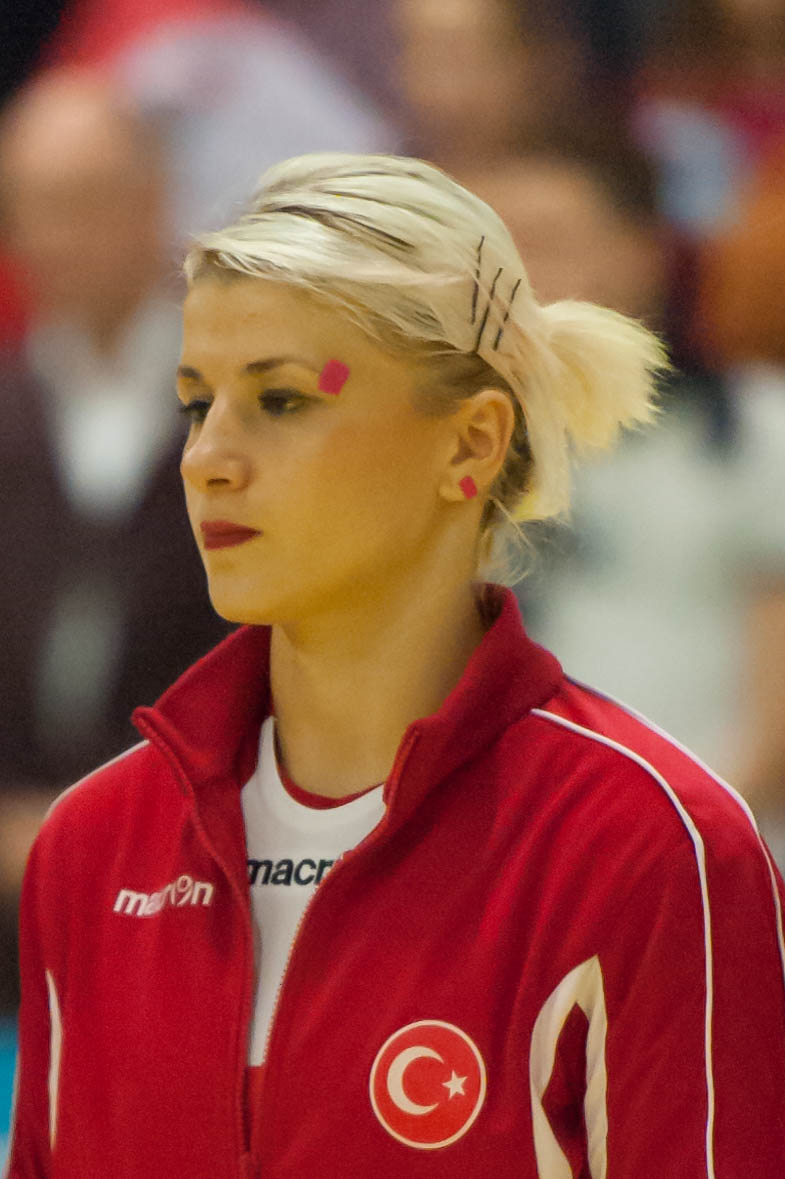
- Perihan Topaloğlu at the 2015 World Women's Handball Championship qualification.

Personal information
- Born: August 31, 1987 (age 39) Bartın, Turkey
- Height: 1.73 m (5 ft 8 in)

Sport
- Sport: Handball
- Position: Left Back
- Current club: Ardeşen GSK
- Number: 5

Senior clubs
- Years: Team
- 2004: Kastamonu Gençlik MSK
- 2009–2010: Kastamonu Türk Telekom
- 2010–2013: Muratpaşa Bld. SK
- 2013–: Ardeşen GSK
National team
- Years: Team
- –: Turkey

Perihan Topaloğlu Acar (born Topaloğlu; August 31, 1987) is a Turkish women's handballer, who plays in the Turkish Women's Handball Super League for Ardeşen GSK, and the Turkey national team. She is the captain of both teams. The 1.73 m (5 ft 8 in)-tall sportswoman plays in the left back position.

== Private life ==
Perihan Topaloğlu was born to Gürsel Topaloğlu in Bartın, Turkey on August 31, 1987. Her father died in a traffic accident in January 2014.

She studied at Kastamonu University, and played for the university team during this time.

In September 2015, she married Doğan Acar, a footballer for Ardeşenspor.

== Club career ==
=== Kastamonu Gençlik Merkezi SK – Kastamonu Türk Telekom ===
At age 16, she began to play handball, joining Kastamonu Gençlik Merkezi SK in the pivot position. She took part with her team in the 2003–04 Women's EHF Cup.

In the 2009–10 season, her club was renamed as Kastamonu Türk telekom. She played in the 2009/10 Women's EHF Challenge Cup.

=== Muratpaşa Bld. SK ===
In the 2010–11 season, Topaloğlu moved to Muratpaşa Bld. SK in Antalya. She played in the Women's EHF Challenge Cup (2010–11, 2011–12), Women's EHF Cup Winners' Cup (2012–13) and Women's EHF Champions League (2013–14).

=== Ardeşen GSK ===
Toplaoğlu was transferred to the Rize-based Ardeşen GSK in July 2013. She serves as team captain. She played in the Women's EHF Challenge Cup (2013–14, 2014–15) and Women's EHF Cup Winners' Cup (2015–16).

=== Görele Bld. GSK ===
She was the top goal scorer in the 2022–23 Super League for three consecutive seasons, named MVP and the Golden Seven (Turkish: Altın Yedi) member of the 2022–23 Super League season by the Turkey Handball Federation. In May 2023, she left the team.

== International career ==
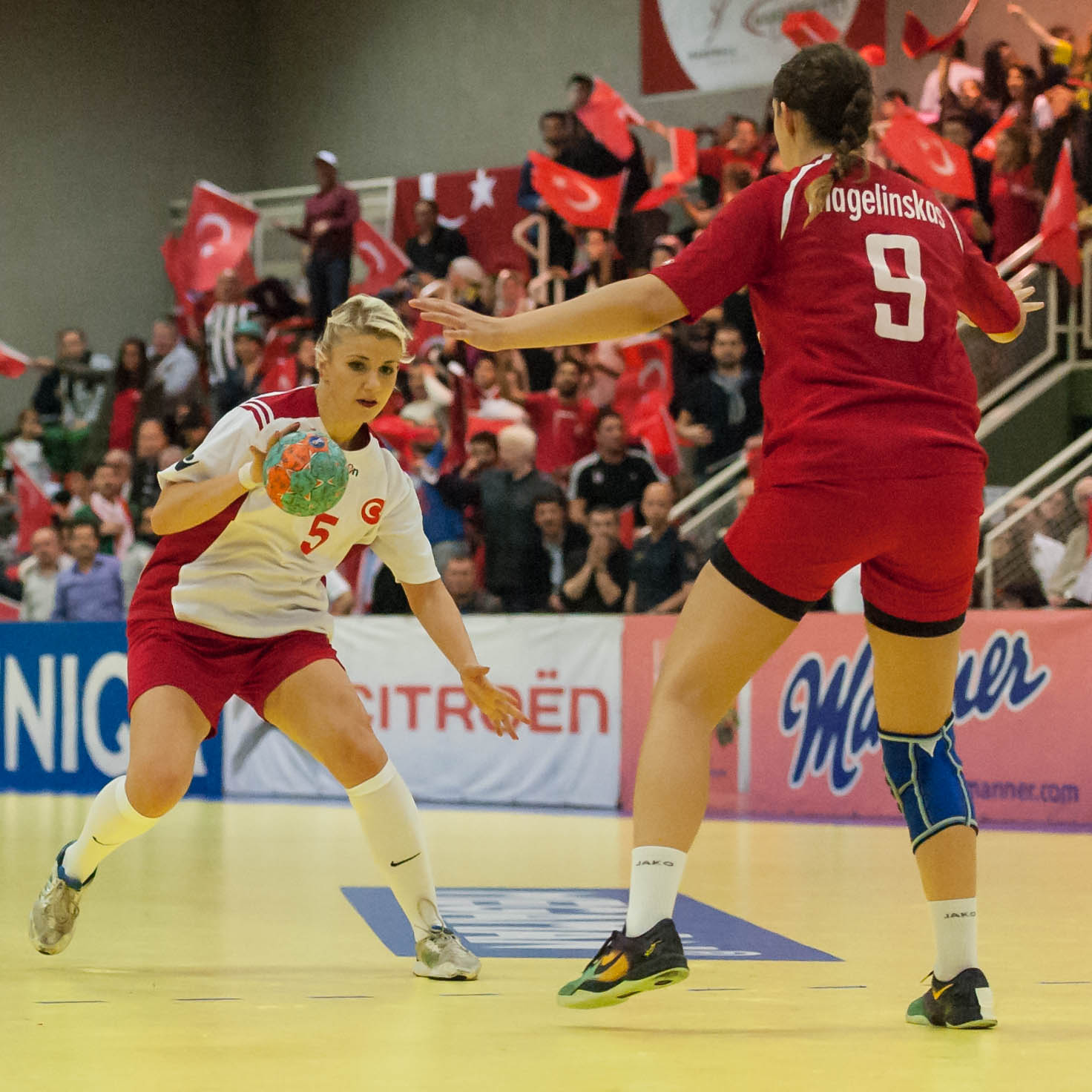
Perihan Topaloğlu (left) attacking Austria in the 2015 World Women's Handball Championship European qualification match.

In 2005, Topaloğlu was called up to the Turkey women's national handball team. She is a permanent member of the national team.

She played in the 2013 Mediterranean Games, and 2015 World Women's Handball Championship – European qualification matches.

== Honours ==
=== Individual ===
Turkish Women's Handball Super League

- Golden Seven member (1): 2022–223 Görele Bld. GSK)
- Best Scorer, 6th European Universities Handball Championships (2011), Rijeka, Croatia.
- Topscorer, 7th European Universities Handball Championships (2012), Cordoba, Spain.
- Topscorer, 2013–14 Turkish Women's Handball Super League.
