= Pogoń Szczecin (women's handball) =

SPR Pogoń Szczecin
- Full name: Szczecińska Piłka Ręczna Pogoń Szczecin
- Founded: 1949; 77 years ago
- Arena: Enea Arena
- Capacity: 5,055 (all seated); 7,055 (with standing)
- League: I liga
- Club colours
| Home | Away |

SPR Pogoń Szczecin is a women's handball club from Szczecin, Poland.

== History ==
The club was founded by Poles from Lwów (now Lviv, Ukraine), who had been transferred west after the Soviet annexation of Poland's eastern territories in 1945. The founders of Pogoń Szczecin had previously been supporters of Pogoń Lwów and the colors of their new club reflect their old club. Polonia Bytom and Odra Opole were likewise founded or revived by the former inhabitants of Lwów.

The most popular sports organization in Szczecin was founded on 21 April 1948 as Klub Sportowy Sztorm. Its first departments were football and boxing, and the football team began playing in the local C-Klasa. In March 1949, several sports clubs in Szczecin (KS Sztorm, KS Cukrownik, KS Drukarz, Pocztowy KS) were merged into a large organization called Klub Sportowy Zwiazkowiec.

After the 2018–19 season, it was decided to liquidate the club. The continuation of Pogoń Szczecin was undertaken by MKS Kusy Szczecin, which in the following season started playing in the 2nd league. In 2021, the team won promotion to the I liga, and the name SPR Pogoń Szczecin was restored.

== Results ==
=== National ===
- Polish First Division:
  - Winners (3): 1983, 1986, 1991
  - Runners-Up (5): 1971, 1984, 1989, 1990, 2016
- Polish Women's Cup:
  - Winners (3): 1971, 1986, 1992

== European record ==
| Season | Competition | Round | Club | 1st leg | 2nd leg | Aggregate |
|---|---|---|---|---|---|---|
| 2014–15 | Challenge Cup | R3 | (Finland) HIFK Handboll | 40–21 | 34–17 | 74–38 |
| 2014–15 | Challenge Cup | 1/8 | (Portugal) JAC-Alcanena | 26–21 | 33–22 | 59–43 |
| 2014–15 | Challenge Cup | 1/4 | (Turkey) Ardeşen GSK | 31–26 | 28–31 | 59–57 |
| 2014–15 | Challenge Cup | 1/2 | (Ukraine) HC Galychanka | 29–28 | 25–21 | 54–49 |
| 2014–15 | Challenge Cup | Final | (France) Mios Biganos | 20–21 | 24–28 | 44–49 |
| 2015–16 | EHF Cup | R2 | (Switzerland) LC Brühl Handball | 31–23 | 28–19 | 59–41 |
| 2015–16 | EHF Cup | R3 | (Romania) Corona Brașov | 20–24 | 24–24 | 44–48 |
| 2016–17 | EHF Cup | R1 | (Ukraine) HC Galychanka | 22–24 | 24–20 | 46–44 |
| 2016–17 | EHF Cup | R2 | (Denmark) Nykøbing Falster HK | 29–35 | 28–33 | 57–68 |
| 2018–19 | Challenge Cup | R3 | (Finland) HIFK Handboll | 33:22 | 21:21 | 54–43 |
| 2018–19 | Challenge Cup | 1/8 | (Portugal) Alavarium Love Tiles | 41-26 | 32-25 | 73-51 |
| 2018–19 | Challenge Cup | 1/4 | (Sweden) Boden Handboll IF | 28-22 | 27-27 | 55-49 |
| 2018–19 | Challenge Cup | 1/2 | (Netherlands) H.V. Quintus | 25-21 | 32-22 | 57-43 |
| 2018–19 | Challenge Cup | Final | (Spain) Rocasa Gran Canaria | 23-30 | 24-23 | 47-53 |
