= ŽRK Naisa =

Handball team from Niš, Serbia

ŽRK Naisa Niš
- Full name: Ženski rukometni klub Naisa Niš
- Founded: 1969
- Arena: Čair Sports Center
- Capacity: 4,800
- President: Tanja Miladinović
- Head Coach: Nebojša Bokić
- League: Handball League of Serbia; WHRL
- Club colours
Home	Away

Location of ŽRK Naisa

Ženski rukometni klub Naisa (Serbian: Женски рукометни клуб Наиса, ŽRK Naisa for short) is a women's handball club from Niš, Serbia, founded in 1969. Currently, Naisa competes in the Handball League of Serbia since 2007.

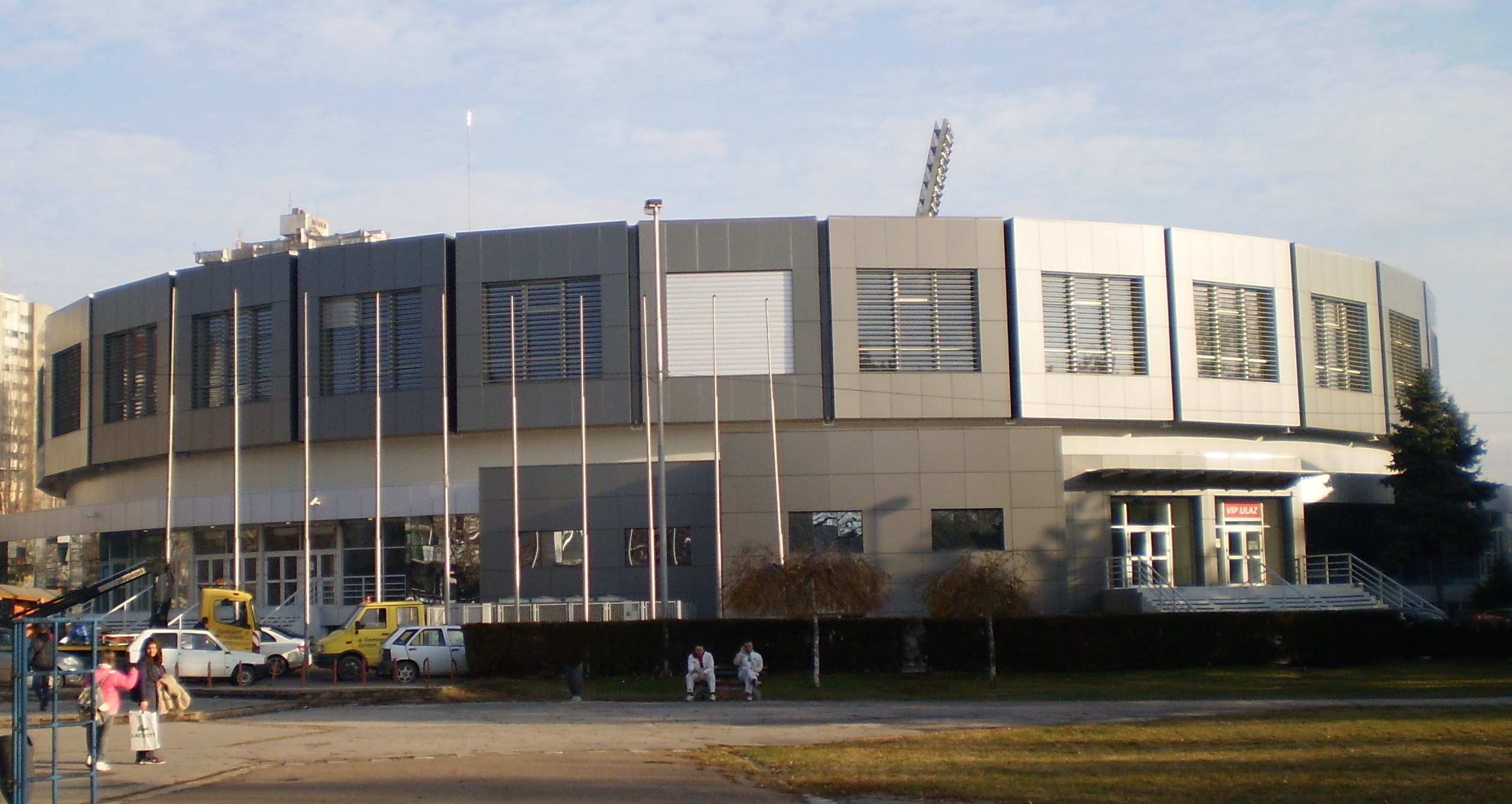
Home arena, Čair Sports Center.

== Kits ==
HOME
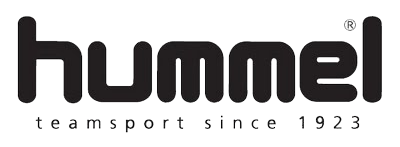
2018-19

== Honours ==
- EHF Challenge Cup:
  - Winners (1): 2006/07
- National Championships :
  - Winners (2) : 2006, 2008
  - Runners-up (4) : 2007, 2009, 2016, 2022, 2026

=== Current squad ===
Squad for the 2026–27 season

Goalkeepers

- 1 (Serbia) Anastasija Nedeljković
- (Serbia) Amna Pidro
- (Serbia) Dunja Tonić

Wingers
RW

- 6 (Serbia) Lana Bukurić
- 33 (Serbia) Anđelija Stojković

LW

- 8 (Serbia) Nataša Ćetković
- 17 (Serbia) Jelena Stojanović

Line Players

- 19 (Serbia) Vladana Mitrović
- 26 (Serbia) Hristina Rešetar

Back players
LB

- 7 (Serbia) Jana Milošević
- 25 (Serbia) Mila Stanković

CB

- 11 (Serbia) Tamara Mandić
- 14 (Serbia) Anja Ranđelović
- 20 (Montenegro) Marija Femić
- 14 (Serbia) Nora Fajfrić

RB

- 9 (Serbia) Isidora Sujić
- 23 (Serbia) Milica Aćimović

== European record ==
Season	Competition	Round	Club	Home	Away	Aggregate
1998–99	Cup Winners' Cup	1/8	(Denmark) Frederiksberg IF	17–31	23–36	40–67
2001–02	EHF Cup	R2	(Bulgaria) Pirin Blagoevgrad HC	36–22	29–27	65–49
2001–02	EHF Cup	R3	(Austria) Handball Wiener Neustadt	29–20	19–30	48–50
2002–03	EHF Cup	R2	(North Macedonia) ŽRK Vardar Skopje	33–14	45–11	78–25
2002–03	EHF Cup	R3	(Denmark) Randers HK	31–16	28–33	59–49
2002–03	EHF Cup	1/8	(Ukraine) HC Motor Zaporizhzhia	25–23	17–32	42–55
2003–04	Champions League	R2	(Russia) Dinamo Volgograd	27–20	16–21	43–41
2003–04	Champions League	Group C	(Denmark) Slagelse FH	28–32	25–31	4th
2003–04	Champions League	Group C	(North Macedonia) Kometal D.P. Skopje	29–31	23–29	4th
2003–04	Champions League	Group C	(Austria) Hypo Niederösterreich	28–30	23–28	4th
2004–05	Champions League	R2	(France) Metz Handball	28–20	20–24	48–44
2004–05	Champions League	Group D	(Slovenia) RK Krim Ljubljana	23–24	30–40	4th
2004–05	Champions League	Group D	(Spain) Orsan Elda Prestigio	27–27	18–26	4th
2004–05	Champions League	Group D	(Norway) Tertnes Bergen	24–25	25–31	4th
2005–06	Cup Winners' Cup	R3	(Portugal) ASSOMADA Camaxide	40–23	24–22	64–45
2005–06	Cup Winners' Cup	1/8	(Hungary) Váci NKSE	26–24	26–32	52–56
2006–07	Challenge Cup	1/8	(Kosovo) KH Vellaznimi Gjakove	42–14	46–13	88–27
2006–07	Challenge Cup	1/4	(Slovakia) SKP HK Banska Bystrica	30–27	25–22	55–49
2006–07	Challenge Cup	1/2	(Romania) Municipal HC Roman Neamt	23–19	20–24	43–43
2006–07	Challenge Cup	Final	(Romania) Univ Jolidon Cluj-Napoca	30–21	23–32	53–53
2007–08	Cup Winners' Cup	R3	(Netherlands) Zeeman Vastgoed SEW	40–23	24–22	64–45
2007–08	Cup Winners' Cup	1/8	(Romania) Univ Jolidon Cluj-Napoca	28–33	18–23	46–56
2008–09	Champions League	QT1 Group B	(Greece) AC Ormi-Loux Patras	21–27		2nd
2008–09	Champions League	QT1 Group B	(Portugal) Madeira Andebol SAD	25–21		2nd
2008–09	Champions League	QT1 Group B	(Netherlands) VOC Amsterdam	32–26		2nd
2008–09	Champions League	QT2 Group 4	(Denmark) FCK Håndbold	17–33		4th
2008–09	Champions League	QT2 Group 4	(Hungary) Dunaferr NK	20–28		4th
2008–09	Champions League	QT2 Group 4	(Ukraine) HC Motor Zaporizhzhia	29–26		4th
2008–09	EHF Cup	R3	(Russia) HC-53 Moscow	23–23	23–20	46–43
2008–09	EHF Cup	1/8	(Russia) HC Kuban	36–30	22–34	58–64
2009–10	Cup Winners' Cup	R3	(Austria) SSV Dornbirn Schoren	33–26	36–23	69–49
2009–10	Cup Winners' Cup	R4	(Turkey) Üsküdar Bld. SK	16–19	27–24	43–43
2009–10	Cup Winners' Cup	1/4	(Germany) VfL Oldenburg	23–31	31–38	53–69
2010–11	EHF Cup	R3	(Netherlands) HV Hellas Den Haag	27–20	28–22	55–42
2010–11	EHF Cup	1/8	(Denmark) Midtjylland	23–31	26–31	49–62
2011–12	EHF Cup	R3	(Turkey) Maliye Milli Piyango SK	26–40	26–44	52–84
2013–14	Challenge Cup	R3	(Montenegro) WHC Danilovgrad	23–17	24–25	47–42
2013–14	Challenge Cup	1/8	(Turkey) Ardeşen GSK	25–30	27–26	52–56
2014–15	Challenge Cup	R3	(United Kingdom) Thames HC	37–20	37–20	74–40
2014–15	Challenge Cup	1/8	(Iceland) Fram	28–32	22–17	50–49
2014–15	Challenge Cup	1/4	(Ukraine) HC Galychanka	22–28	20–27	42–55
2015–16	EHF Cup	R2	(Germany) A.C. Loux Patras	27–14	38–8	65–22
2015–16	EHF Cup	R3	(Germany) TuS Metzingen	29–34	21–50	50–88
2016–17	EHF Cup	R1	(Germany) SG BBM Bietigheim	15–34	19–37	34–71
2017–18	Challenge Cup	R3	(Israel) Maccabi Arazim Ramat Gan	25–20	28–23	53–43
2017–18	Challenge Cup	1/8	(Netherlands) Virto/Quintus	31–39	25–35	56–74
2018–19	Challenge Cup	R3	(Portugal) Sir 1 Maio/Ada CJB	28–17	30–23	58–40
2018–19	Challenge Cup	1/8	(North Macedonia) ŽRK Pelister	33–26	34–24	67–50
2018–19	Challenge Cup	1/4	(Sweden) Kristianstad Handboll	25–35	27–23	52–58

== Notable former players ==
- Sanja Damnjanović
- Biljana Filipović
- Jelena Popović
- Svetlana Ognjenović
- Sanja Premović

== Notable former coaches ==
- Svetislav Jovanović

== See also ==
- RK Naissus
