= 2015–16 Women's EHF Cup =

European handball tournament

Women's EHF Cup
- 2015–16

Tournament information
- Sport: Handball
- Dates: 16 October 2015–6 May 2016

Final positions
- Champions: (Hungary) Dunaújvárosi KKA
- Runner-up: (Germany) TuS Metzingen

Tournament statistics
- Top scorer(s): (Germany) Anna Loerper (Hungary) Krisztina Triscsuk (Romania) Cristina Zamfir (57 Goals)

The 2015–16 Women's EHF Cup will be 35th edition of EHF's third-tier women's handball competition. It started on 16 October 2015.

== Round and draw dates ==
All draws held at the European Handball Federation headquarters in Vienna, Austria.

Round	Draw date	First leg	Second leg
Round 2	22 July 2015	16–24 October 2015	17–25 October 2015
Round 3	22 July 2015	13–21 November 2015	14–22 November 2015
Last 16	24 November 2015	9–10 January 2015	16–17 January 2015
Quarter-final	19 January 2016	20–21 February 2016	27–28 February 2016
Semi-finals	19 January 2016	2–3 April 2016	9–10 April 2016
Finals			

== Qualification stage ==
=== Round 2 ===
Teams listed first played the first leg at home. Some teams agreed to play both matches in the same venue. Bolded teams qualified into the third round.

Team 1	Agg.	Team 2	1st leg	2nd leg
London GD Handball Club (United Kingdom)	28–62^{a}	(Greece) **OF Nea Ionia**	11–35	11–27
HŽRK Grude Autoherc (Bosnia and Herzegovina)	49–66^{b}	(Iceland) **Fram**	22–38	27–28
**RK Zagorje** (Slovenia)	93–26^{c}	(Cyprus) AC Latsia Nicosia	47–12	46–14
HC Holon (Israel)	46–62^{d}	(Italy) **Indeco Conversano**	27–32	19–30
**DHK Banik Most** (Czech Republic)	57–37	(Italy) Cassano Magnago HC	30–17	27–20
**Pogoń Baltica Szczecin** (Poland)	59–42^{e}	(Switzerland) LC Brühl Handball	31–23	28–19
**IUVENTA Michalovce** (Slovakia)	95–25^{f}	(Luxembourg) HC Standard	48–15	47–10
**SPONO Eagles** (Switzerland)	63–62^{g}	(Lithuania) ACME-Zalgiris Kaunas	38–27	25–35
KHF Kastrioti (Kosovo)	51–59	(Belgium) **Hubo Initia Hasselt**	23–32	28–27
ŽRK Ilidža (Bosnia and Herzegovina)	36–55^{h}	(Portugal) **Alavarium/Love Tiles**	21–25	15–30
HB Dudelange (Luxembourg)	34–74^{i}	(Croatia) **WHC Zamet**	16–39	18–35
**ŽRK Naisa Niš** (Serbia)	65–22^{j}	(Greece) A.C. Loux Patras	27–14	38–8
**HC Galychanka** (Ukraine)	52–31^{k}	(Kosovo) KHF Prishtina	26–17	26–14
Fémina Visé (Belgium)	42–72	(Netherlands) **SS/VOC Amsterdam**	20–34	22–38

Notes

^{a} Both legs were hosted by O.F.N. Ionias.
^{b} Both legs were hosted by Fram.
^{c} Both legs were hosted by A.C. Latsia Nicosia.
^{d} Both legs were hosted by Indeco Conversano.
^{e} Both legs were hosted by Pogon Baltica Szczecin.
^{f} Both legs were hosted by IUVENTA Michalovce.

^{g} Both legs were hosted by ACME-Zalgiris Kaunas.
^{h} Both legs were hosted by Alavarium / Love Tiles.
^{i} Both legs were hosted by HB Dudelange.
^{j} Both legs were hosted by ŽRK Naisa Niš.
^{k} Both legs were hosted by KHF Prishtina.

=== Round 3 ===
Teams listed first played the first leg at home. Some teams agreed to play both matches in the same venue. Bolded teams qualified into last 16.

Team 1	Agg.	Team 2	1st leg	2nd leg
**Randers HK** (Denmark)	65–43	(Netherlands) SS/VOC Amsterdam	36–25	29–18
**Muratpaşa Bld. SK** (Turkey)	58–52	(Ukraine) HC Galychanka	28–22	30–30
**Siófok KC** (Hungary)	79–46^{a}	(Portugal) Alavarium/Love Tiles	40–25	39–21
**IUVENTA Michalovce** (Slovakia)	58–53	(Spain) Balonmano Bera Bera	34–29	24–24
RK Zagorje (Slovenia)	42–60^{b}	(Germany) **HC Leipzig**	17–26	25–34
**Astrakhanochka** (Russia)	81–43^{c}	(Greece) OF Nea Ionia	42–28	39–15
WHC Zamet (Croatia)	44–58^{d}	(Denmark) **HC Odense**	23–28	21–30
**HBC Nimes** (France)	67–44^{e}	(Belgium) Hubo Initia Hasselt	39–18	28–26
ŽRK Naisa Niš (Serbia)	50–88^{f}	(Germany) **TuS Metzingen**	29–38	21–50
**HCM Roman** (Romania)	56–47	(Iceland) Fram	29–25	27–22
SPONO Eagles (Switzerland)	42–67^{g}	(Denmark) **Silkeborg-Voel KFUM**	20–33	22–34
**Dinamo Volgograd** (Russia)	61–58^{h}	(Czech Republic) DHK Baník Most	31–31	30–27
**Tertnes Bergen** (Norway)	20–0	(France) Union Mios Biganos-Begles	10–0	10–0
**Dunaújvárosi KKA** (Hungary)	68–49	(Italy) Indeco Conversano	37–25	31–24
Nantes (France)	54–56	(Sweden) **H 65 Höör**	27–26	27–30
**Corona Brașov** (Romania)	48–44^{i}	(Poland) Pogoń Baltica Szczecin	24–24	24–20

Notes

^{a} Both legs were hosted by Siófok KC.
^{b} Both legs were hosted by HC Leipzig.
^{c} Both legs were hosted by Astrakhanochka.
^{d} Both legs were hosted by HC Odense.

^{e} Both legs were hosted by Hubo Initia Hasselt.
^{f} Both legs were hosted by TuS Metzingen.
^{g} Both legs were hosted by Silkeborg-Voel KFUM.
^{h} Both legs were hosted by DHK Banik Most.
^{h} Both legs were hosted by Pogon Baltica Szczecin.

== Last 16 ==
Teams listed first played the first leg at home. Bolded teams qualified into quarter-finals.

Team 1	Agg.	Team 2	1st leg	2nd leg
**TuS Metzingen** (Germany)	56–48	(Slovakia) IUVENTA Michalovce	30–26	26–22
Tertnes Bergen (Norway)	46–50	(Denmark) **HC Odense**	21–22	25–28
HCM Roman (Romania)	43–47	(Romania) **Corona Brașov**	22–21	21–26
HBC Nimes (France)	48–60	(Denmark) **Randers HK**	27–27	21–33
**Dunaújvárosi KKA** (Hungary)	47–47	(Hungary) Siófok KC	24–19	23–28
**HC Leipzig** (Germany)	59–51	(Turkey) Muratpaşa Bld. SK	33–26	26–25
**Astrakhanochka** (Russia)	54–45	(Russia) Dinamo Volgograd	31–26	23–19
**H 65 Höör** (Sweden)	50–50	(Denmark) Silkeborg-Voel KFUM	22–26	28–24

=== Quarter-finals ===
Teams listed first played the first leg at home. Bolded teams qualified into semi-finals.

Team 1	Agg.	Team 2	1st leg	2nd leg
HC Odense (Denmark)	42–50	(Romania) **Corona Brașov**	21–29	21–21
Astrakhanochka (Russia)	46–48^{a}	(Hungary) **Dunaújvárosi KKA**	26–23	20–25
**Randers HK** (Denmark)	57–49	(Sweden) H 65 Höör	30–27	27–22
**TuS Metzingen** (Germany)	52–49	(Germany) HC Leipzig	25–24	27–25

Notes
^{a} Both legs were hosted by Dunaújváros.

=== Semi-finals ===
Team 1	Agg.	Team 2	1st leg	2nd leg
Corona Brașov (Romania)	45–56	**(Germany) TuS Metzingen**	22–26	23–30
Randers HK (Denmark)	52–52	(Hungary) **Dunaújvárosi KKA**	27–29	25–23

=== Final ===
Team 1	Agg.	Team 2	1st leg	2nd leg
TuS Metzingen (Germany)	49–55	(Hungary) **Dunaújvárosi KKA**	28–26	21–29

== See also ==
- 2015–16 Women's EHF Champions League
- 2015–16 Women's EHF Cup Winners' Cup
- 2015–16 Women's EHF Challenge Cup
