= Fémina Visé =

Belgian handball club

- Full name: Handball Fémina Visé
- Founded: 1975
- Arena: Hall Omnisport, Visé
- Capacity: 600
- Head coach: Linde Panis
- League: First Division
- 2018–19: 4th
- Club colours
Home	Away

Fémina Visé is a Belgian women's handball club from Visé. It was originally established in 1975 as Amicale Visé's women's team before becoming an independent club in 1986 under its current name.

Fémina has been one of the Belgian Championship's leading teams for the past 22 years, with twelve titles since 1997. It is also a regular team in EHF competition's qualifying stages.

== Titles ==
- Belgian First Division: 12
  - 1997, 1998, 1999, 2000, 2001, 2004, 2007, 2008, 2009, 2010, 2012, 2014
- Belgian Cup: 13
  - 1994, 1998, 1999, 2000, 2003, 2004, 2007, 2008, 2009, 2013, 2014, 2016, 2017

== European record ==
Season	Competition	Round	Club	Home	Away	Aggregate
1998–99	EHF Champions League	1/16	(France) Besançon	13–33	17–29	30–62
1999–00	EHF Champions League	1/16	(Denmark) Viborg	19–39	12–41	31–80
2000–01	EHF Cup Winners' Cup	R3	(Germany) Mainz	26–32	22–36	48–68
2001–02	EHF Cup	R2	(France) Bouillargues	15–23	23–36	38–59
2002–03	EHF Cup	R1	(Lithuania) Eastcon Vilnius	19–32	19–27	38–49
2003–04	EHF Cup Winners' Cup	R2	(Denmark) København	19–38	12–42	31–80
2004–05	EHF Cup	R1	(Cyprus) Youth Union Athienou	26–20	41–24	67–44
2004–05	EHF Cup	R2	(Norway) Byåsen	18–51	21–49	39–100
2005–06	EHF Cup	R1	(Cyprus) Latsia Nicosia	35–38	28–33	63–71
2006–07	EHF Cup	R1	(Belgium) Juventus Melveren	22–16	19–19	41–35
2006–07	EHF Cup	R2	(Switzerland) Spono Eagles	12–24	17–32	29–60
2007–08	EHF Cup	R2	(Hungary) Alba Fehérvár	21–28	17–37	38–65
2008–09	EHF Cup	R1	(Bulgaria) Lokomotiv Varna	23–34	23–28	46–62
2009–10	EHF Cup	R2	(Serbia) Vrnjačka Banja	24–28	29–37	53–65
2010–11	EHF Cup	R2	(Romania) Dunărea Brăila	17–32	17–39	34–71
2011–12	Challenge Cup	R3	(Belarus) Victoria Berestye	25–27	27–39	52–76
2012–13	EHF Cup	R2	(Israel) Ramat Gan	41–23	41–21	82–44
2012–13	EHF Cup	R3	(Turkey) Çankaya Belediyesi	25–42	21–31	46–73
2013–14	EHF Cup	R2	(Kosovo) Kastrioti	37–31	30–25	67–56
2013–14	EHF Cup	R3	(Turkey) Çankaya Belediyesi	24–22	22–29	46–51
2014–15	EHF Cup	R2	(Faroe Islands) Kyndil Tórshavn	20–21	22–15	42–36
2014–15	EHF Cup	R3	(Turkey) Muratpaşa	20–37	21–25	41–62
2015–16	EHF Cup	R2	(Netherlands) VOC Amsterdam	20–34	22–38	42–72
2016–17	Challenge Cup	R3	(Azerbaijan) ABU Baku	16–26	20–24	36–50
2017–18	Challenge Cup	R3	(Sweden) Kristianstad	13–27	10–25	23–52
2018–19	Challenge Cup	R2	(Israel) Holon	26–22	26–23	52−45
2018–19	Challenge Cup	R3	(Sweden) Kristianstad	17–27	14–25	31–52
