= Fatma Gül Sakızcan =

Turkish handball player

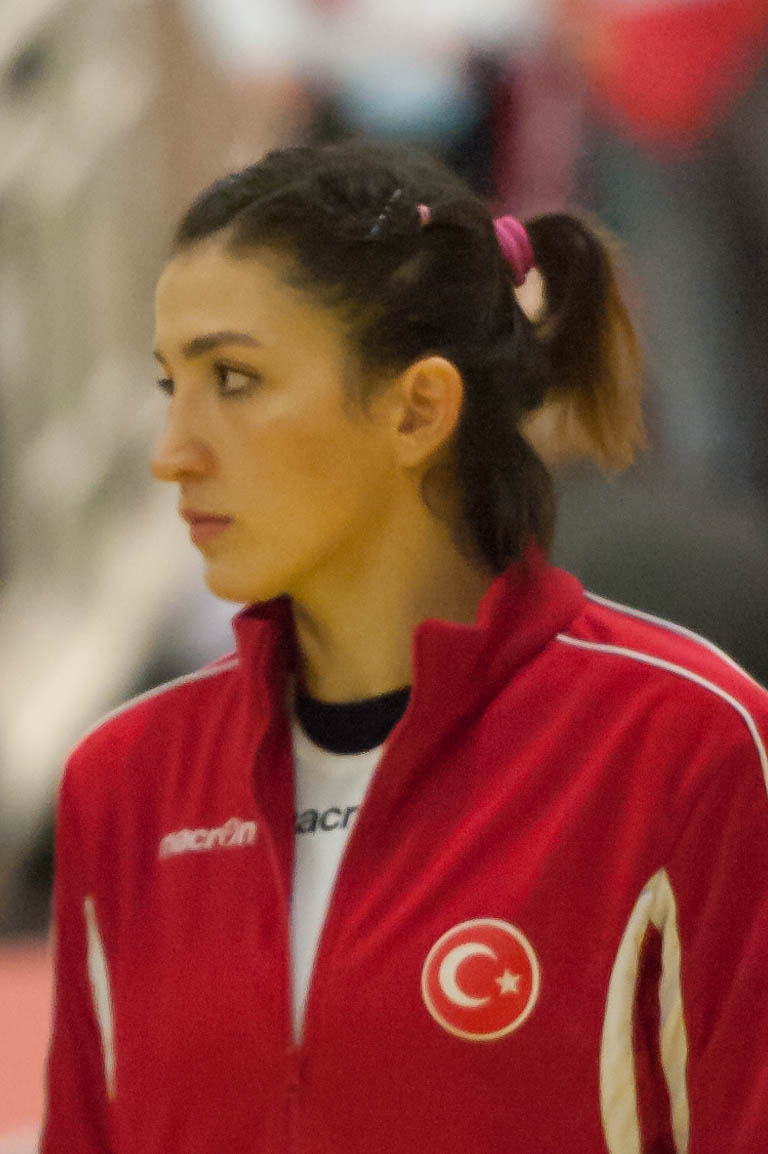
- Fatma Gül Sakızcan at the 2015 World Women's Handball Championship Qualification

Personal information
- Nationality: Turkish
- Born: 31 March 1992 (age 34) Manisa, Turkey
- Height: 1.73 m (5 ft 8 in)

Sport
- Sport: Handball
- Position: Left wing
- Current club: Üsküdar Bld. SK
- Number: 17

Youth career
- Years: Team
- –: 0

Senior clubs
- Years: Team
- 2012–2014: Üsküdar Bld. SK
- 2014–2015: Ardeşen GSK
- 2018–2019: Kastamonu Bld. GSK
- 2020–2022: Yalıkavak SK
- 2022–: Üsküdar Bld. SK
National team
- Years: Team
- 2009: Turkey U-17
- 2018–: Turkey
Medal record
Representing Turkey
Women's handball

Fatma Gül Sakızcan (born 31 March 1992), also known as Fatmagül Sakızcan, is a Turkish handballer, who plays as left wing for Üsküdar Bld. SK in the Turkish Super League and the Turkey national team.

== Personal life ==
Fatma Gül Sakızcan was born in Manisa, Turkey on 31 March 1992.

== Club career ==
Sakızcan is 1.73 m (5 ft 8 in) tall at 64 kg (141 lb). She plays in the left wing position.

=== Üsküdar Bld. SK ===
She started her sport career at the Istanbul-based club Üsküdar Bld. SK in 2012. She took part in the 2012–13 EHF Challenge Cup, and the 2013–14 Women's EHF Cup Winners' Cup.

=== Ardeşen GSK ===
In August 2014, she moved to Ardeşen GSK in Rize, and played in the 2014–15 EHF Challenge Cup.

=== Kastamonu Bld. GSK ===
She played for Kastamonu Bld. GSK in the 2018–19 Turkish Super League season. She took part in the 2015–16 EHF Challenge Cup, becoming runner-up, in the 2019–20 EHF Champions League qualifying, the 2018–19 EHF Cup, and the 2019–20 EHF Cup.

=== Yalıkavak SK ===
In 2020, she joined Yalıkavak SK in Bodrum, Muğla, where she played two seasons. She participated in the 2021–22 EHF European Cup, and the 2020–21 EHF European League.

=== Üsküdar Bld. SK ===
For the 2022–23 season, she returned to her initial club Üsküdar Bld. SK.

== International career ==
In 2009, Sakızcan was admitted to the Turkey women's national U-17 team. Sakızcan is a member of the Turkey women's national handball team. She was part of the national team at the 2018 Mediterranean Games in Tarragona, Spain. She played at the 2022 European Championship qualification.

== Honours ==
Turkish Women's Handball Super League

Üsküdar Bld. SK
Runners-up (2): 2011–12, 2012–13.

Kastamonu Bld. GSK
Champion (1): 2018–19.

Yalıkavak SK
Runners-up /2): 2020–21, 2021–22.

Women's EHF Challenge Cup

Üsküdar Bld. SK
Third place (1): 2012–13.

Kastamonu Bld. GSK
Runner-up (1): 2015–16.
