= 2016–17 Women's EHF Challenge Cup =

Season 2016-2017 of the Women's EHF Challenge cup

Women's EHF Challenge Cup
- 2016–17

Tournament information
- Sport: Handball
- Dates: 15 October 2016–14 May 2017
- Administrator: European Handball Federation

Final positions
- Champions: (Croatia) HC Lokomotiva Zagreb
- Runner-up: (Sweden) H 65 Höör

The 2016–17 Women's EHF Challenge Cup is the 20th edition of the European Handball Federation's third-tier competition for women's handball clubs, running from 15 October 2016.

== Overview ==
=== Team allocation ===
- TH: Title holders

Round 3
| (Spain) Rocasa Gran Canaria ACE (TH) | (Sweden) H 65 Höör (5th) | (Croatia) HC Lokomotiva Zagreb (2nd) | (Finland) HIFK (2nd) |
| (Spain) Mecalia Atlético Guardés (3rd) | (Czech Republic) DHC Sokol Poruba (3rd) | (Iceland) Haukar (3rd) | (Bosnia and Herzegovina) ŽRK Mira Prijedor (2nd) |
| (Spain) Prosetecnisa Zuazo (CR) | (Netherlands) Virto/Quintus (3rd) | (Kosovo) KHF Shqiponja (2nd) | (Italy) Jomi Salerno (3rd) |
| (Ukraine) HC Karpaty (2nd) | (Portugal) Colégio de Gaia (3rd) | (Slovenia) ŽRK Mlinotest Ajdovščina (3rd) | (Austria) UHC Müllner Bau Stockerau (4th) |
| (Ukraine) HC Dnepryanka Kherson (3rd) | (Switzerland) LK Zug (3rd) | (Montenegro) ŽRK Danilovgrad (2nd) | (Belgium) Fémina Visé (3rd) |
| (Turkey) Ardesen GSK (3rd) | (North Macedonia) HC Vardar SCJS (3rd) | (Israel) Maccabi Arazim Ramat Gan (3rd) | (Bulgaria) HC Svilengrad-PU (2nd) |
| (Poland) Kram Start Elbląg (4th) | (Azerbaijan) ABU Baku (2nd) | (United Kingdom) Olympia HC (CW) | (Georgia (country)) HC Mamuli (3rd) |
Round 2
| (Turkey) Zagnosspor (4th) | (Portugal) CS Madeira (6th) | (Bosnia and Herzegovina) ŽRK Ilidža (3rd) | (Austria) SSV Dornbirn Schoren (6th) |
| (Switzerland) DHB Rotweiss Thun (4th) | (North Macedonia) ŽRK Kumanovo (4th) | (Italy) ASD Ariosta P. Ferrara (4th) | (Spain) Helvetia BM Alcobendas (4th) |

=== Round and draw dates ===
All draws held at the European Handball Federation headquarters in Vienna, Austria.

| Round | Draw date | First leg | Second leg |
|---|---|---|---|
| Round 2 | 19 July 2016 | 15–16 October 2016 | 22–23 October 2016 |
| Round 3 | 19 July 2016 | 12–13 November 2016 | 19–20 November 2016 |
| Last 16 | 22 November 2016 | 4–5 February 2017 | 11–12 February 2017 |
| Quarter-final | 14 February 2017 | 4–5 March 2017 | 11–12 March 2017 |
| Semi-finals | 14 February 2017 | 8–9 April 2017 | 15–16 April 2017 |
| Final | 18 April 2017 | 6–7 May 2017 | 13–14 May 2017 |

== Qualification stage ==
=== Round 2 ===
Teams listed first played the first leg at home. Bolded teams qualified into round 3.

| Team 1 | Agg. | Team 2 | 1st leg | 2nd leg |
|---|---|---|---|---|
| **DHB Rotweiss Thun** (Switzerland) | 56–41 | (Italy) ASD Ariosta P. Ferrara | 34–17 | 28–24 |
| SSV Dornbirn Schoren (Austria) | 54–66 | (Portugal) **CS Madeira** | 34–36 | 20–30 |
| ŽRK Ilidža (Bosnia and Herzegovina) | 39–70^{a} | (Turkey) **Zagnosspor** | 23–33 | 16–37 |
| ŽRK Kumanovo (North Macedonia) | 57–77 | (Spain) **Helvetia BM Alcobendas** | 17–23 | 15–31 |

Notes

^{a} Both legs were hosted by Zagnosspor.

=== Round 3 ===
Teams listed first played the first leg at home. Some teams agreed to play both matches in the same venue. Bolded teams qualified into last 16.

| Team 1 | Agg. | Team 2 | 1st leg | 2nd leg |
|---|---|---|---|---|
| UHC Müllner Bau Stockerau (Austria) | 37–61 | (Poland) **Kram Start Elbląg** | 17–28 | 20–33 |
| **LK Zug** (Switzerland) | 85–24^{a} | (United Kingdom) Olympia HC | 45–17 | 40–7 |
| **Ardesen GSK** (Turkey) | 58–47 | (Montenegro) ŽRK Danilovgrad | 30–23 | 28–24 |
| **Virto/Quintus** (Netherlands) | 90–40^{b} | (Bosnia and Herzegovina) ŽRK Mira Prijedor | 46–19 | 44–21 |
| HIFK (Finland) | 33–71^{c} | (Spain) **Rocasa Gran Canaria ACE** | 12–39 | 21–32 |
| **Haukar** (Iceland) | 50–41^{d} | (Italy) Jomi Salerno | 23–19 | 27–22 |
| **H 65 Höör** (Sweden) | 51–46 | (Spain) Prosetecnisa Zuazo | 31–25 | 20–21 |
| HC Svilengrad-PU (Bulgaria) | 39–53 | (North Macedonia) **HC Vardar SCJS** | 17–24 | 22–29 |
| Fémina Visé (Belgium) | 36–50^{e} | (Azerbaijan) **ABU Baku** | 16–26 | 20–24 |
| **DHC Sokol Poruba** (Czech Republic) | 65–19^{f} | (Georgia (country)) HC Mamuli | 34–12 | 31–7 |
| **ŽRK Mlinotest Ajdovščina** (Slovenia) | 48–43^{g} | (Turkey) Zagnosspor | 25–22 | 23–21 |
| **HC Karpaty** (Ukraine) | 54–42^{h} | (Switzerland) DHB Rotweiss Thun | 34–25 | 20–17 |
| CS Madeira (Portugal) | 45–69 | (Croatia) **HC Lokomotiva Zagreb** | 24–29 | 21–40 |
| Maccabi Arazim Ramat Gan (Israel) | 59–59^{i} | (Kosovo) **KHF Shqiponja** | 31–30 | 28–29 |
| Helvetia BM Alcobendas (Spain) | 44–50 | (Portugal) **Colégio de Gaia** | 25–21 | 19–29 |
| HC Dnepryanka Kherson (Ukraine) | 40–63^{j} | (Spain) **Mecalia Atlético Guardés** | 22–33 | 18–30 |

Notes

^{a} Both legs were hosted by Olympia HC.
^{b} Both legs were hosted by Virto/Quintus.
^{c} Both legs were hosted by Rocasa Gran Canaria ACE.
^{d} Both legs were hosted by Jomi Salerno.
^{e} Both legs were hosted by ABU Baku.
^{e} Both legs were hosted by HC Mamuli.
^{e} Both legs were hosted by Zagnosspor.
^{e} Both legs were hosted by HC Karpaty.
^{e} Both legs were hosted by KHF Shqiponja.
^{e} Both legs were hosted by Mecalia Atlético Guardés.

== Knockout stage ==
=== Last 16 ===
Teams listed first played the first leg at home. Some teams agreed to play both matches in the same venue. Bolded teams qualified into quarterfinals.

| Team 1 | Agg. | Team 2 | 1st leg | 2nd leg |
|---|---|---|---|---|
| **LK Zug** (Switzerland) | 65–50^{a} | (Ukraine) HC Karpaty | 29–25 | 36–25 |
| **DHC Sokol Poruba** (Czech Republic) | 97–40 | (Kosovo) KHF Shqiponja | 51–18 | 46–22 |
| ABU Baku (Azerbaijan) | 47–65^{b} | (Poland) **Kram Start Elbląg** | 23–33 | 24–32 |
| **HC Lokomotiva Zagreb** (Croatia) | 57–45 | (Turkey) Ardesen GSK | 33–25 | 24–20 |
| Haukar (Iceland) | 50–51^{c} | (Netherlands) **Virto/Quintus** | 26–29 | 24–22 |
| **H 65 Höör** (Sweden) | 52–33 | (North Macedonia) HC Vardar SCJS | 26–13 | 26–20 |
| ŽRK Mlinotest Ajdovščina (Slovenia) | 39–67 | (Spain) **Rocasa Gran Canaria ACE** | 18–31 | 21–36 |
| Colégio de Gaia (Portugal) | 48–62 | (Spain) **Mecalia Atlético Guardés** | 26–30 | 22–32 |

Notes
^{a} Both legs were hosted by LK Zug.
^{b} Both legs were hosted by Kram Start Elblag.
^{c} Both legs were hosted by Haukar.

=== Quarterfinals ===
Teams listed first played the first leg at home. Bolded teams qualified into semifinals.

| Team 1 | Agg. | Team 2 | 1st leg | 2nd leg |
|---|---|---|---|---|
| Kram Start Elbląg (Poland) | 43–51 | (Czech Republic) **DHC Sokol Poruba** | 29–24 | 14–27 |
| **H 65 Höör** (Sweden) | 53–45 | (Spain) Mecalia Atlético Guardés | 24–21 | 29–24 |
| **Virto/Quintus** (Netherlands) | 69–41 | (Switzerland) LK Zug | 35–12 | 34–29 |
| **HC Lokomotiva Zagreb** (Croatia) | 52–50 | (Spain) Rocasa Gran Canaria ACE | 29–24 | 23–26 |

=== Semifinals ===
| Team 1 | Agg. | Team 2 | 1st leg | 2nd leg |
|---|---|---|---|---|
| **HC Lokomotiva Zagreb** (Croatia) | 51–39 ^{a} | (Netherlands) Virto/Quintus | 24–23 | 27–16 |
| **H 65 Höör** (Sweden) | 50–30 | (Czech Republic) DHC Sokol Poruba | 28–16 | 22–14 |

Notes
^{a} Both legs were hosted by HC Lokomotiva Zagreb.

=== Final ===
| Team 1 | Agg. | Team 2 | 1st leg | 2nd leg |
|---|---|---|---|---|
| **HC Lokomotiva Zagreb** (Croatia) | 47–40 | (Sweden) H 65 Höör | 23–19 | 24–21 |

== See also ==
- 2016–17 Women's EHF Champions League
- 2016–17 Women's EHF Cup
