= ABU SC Baku =

- Full name: ABU Sport Club Baku
- Arena: ABU Arena
- League: Premier Handball League
- 2015-2016: 2nd

ABU Sport Club Baku is a women's handball club from Baku in Azerbaijan. ABU SC Baku competes in the Premier Handball League. It has been the strongest team in Azerbaijan, having won a record 19 titles.

== Honours ==
- Premier Handball League
  - Winners (19) : 2001, 2002, 2003, 2004, 2005, 2006, 2007, 2008, 2009, 2010, 2011, 2012, 2013, 2014, 2015, 2016, 2017, 2018, 2019

== European record ==
Season	Competition	Round	Club	1st leg	2nd leg	Aggregate
2001–02	Challenge Cup	R2	(Ukraine) Galychanka Lviv	17–27	20–17	37–44
2002-03	Winners' Cup	R3	(Slovenia) Jelovica Škofja Loka	23–19	25–26	48–45
2002-03	Winners' Cup	1/8	(France) ES Besançon	20–28	23–31	43–59
2003-04	Winners' Cup	R2	(Netherlands) Omni sportverenigung Hellas	23–24	30–25	53–49
2003-04	Winners' Cup	R3	(France) HB Metz Métropole	15–24	22–24	37–48
2004–05	Winners' Cup	R2	(Germany) 1. FC Nürnberg Handball 2009	23–32	25–35	48–67
2005-06	Challenge Cup	R3	(Italy) RIAM Ascensori Dossobuono	36–26	33–36	62–29
2005-06	Challenge Cup	1/8	(Romania) Tomis Constanta	30–35	23–28	53–63
2006-07	Winners' Cup	R2	(Poland) MKS Zagłębie Lubin	27–35	27–29	54–54
2006-07	Winners' Cup	R3	(France) Le Havre HAC	19–27	18–24	37–51
2007-08	Challenge Cup	R3	(Croatia) ŽRK "Tvin Trgocentar" Virovitica	34–16	28–13	62–29
2007-08	Challenge Cup	1/8	(Romania) Tomis Constanta	22–32	32–29	54–61
2008–09	Winners' Cup	R2	(Cyprus) Panellionios Lefkosias	27–23	20–25	47–48
2009–10	Winners' Cup	R3	(France) Mios Biganos	26–35	24–39	50–74
2010–11	Challenge Cup	1/8	(Czech Republic) Sokol Pisek	29–33	26–35	55–68
2011–12	Challenge Cup	R3	(Croatia) Zelina	18–35	23–27	41–62
2012-13	Challenge Cup	R3	(Turkey) Anadolu Üniversitesi S.C.	32–24	25–16	57–40
2012-13	Challenge Cup	1/8	(Poland) AZS Politechnika Koszalińska	15–38	22–37	37–75
2013-14	Challenge Cup	R3	(Greece) M. Alexandros Giannitson	32–21	28–18	60–39
2013-14	Challenge Cup	1/8	(Serbia) RK BMS Milenium	29–33	26–29	55–62
2014-15	Challenge Cup	R3	(Serbia) Crvena zvezda	31–29	23–23	54–52
2014-15	Challenge Cup	1/8	(Serbia) ŽRK Knjaz Miloš	28–37	28–27	56–64
2015–16	Challenge Cup	R3	(Netherlands) Schuler Afbouwgroep/DOS	19–27	22–29	41–56
2016-17	Challenge Cup	R3	(Belgium) Fémina Visé	26–16	24–20	50–36
2016-17	Challenge Cup	1/8	(Poland) Kram Start Elbląg	23–33	24–32	47–65
2017–18	Challenge Cup	R3	(Luxembourg) HB Dudelange	32–16	36–15	68–31
2017–18	Challenge Cup	1/8	(Sweden) Kristianstad Handboll	18–27	23–30	41–57
2018–19	Challenge Cup	R3	(Turkey) Ankara Yenimahalle BSK	24–31	30–29	54–60

== Team ==
=== Current squad ===
Squad for the 2016–17 season

Goalkeepers

- (Ukraine) Nataliya Gaiovych
- (Azerbaijan) Azaliya Hasanova
- (Azerbaijan) Madina Musayeva
- (Azerbaijan) Sabina Nuriyeva

Wingers
RW

- (Azerbaijan) Sakinat Abbasova
- (Azerbaijan) Yana Nazarova
- (Azerbaijan) Inara Yusibova

LW

- (Azerbaijan) Yana Gornak
- (Azerbaijan) Aynur Kalmikova

Line Players

- (Azerbaijan) Vafa Mammadova
- (Russia) Oksana Orekhova
- (Azerbaijan) Ulviyya Sharifova

Back players
LB

- (Azerbaijan) Irana Gasimova

CB

- (Azerbaijan) Marta Abbasova
- (Ukraine) Anastasiia Metelska

RB

- (Azerbaijan) Gunel Aliyeva
- (Azerbaijan) Anna Hamidova
- (Azerbaijan) Sakina Musayeva
