= 2011–12 Women's EHF Challenge Cup =

The 2011–12 Women's EHF Challenge Cup was the 18th edition of the European Handball Federation's third-tier competition for women's handball clubs, running from 30 September 2011 to 12 May 2012. It was won by Le Havre from France.

== First qualifying round ==
=== Group A ===
Team	Pld	W	D	L	GF	GA	GD	Pts
(Czech Republic) Sokol Písek	3	3	0	0	108	83	+25	6
(Poland) Kielce	3	1	0	2	89	85	+4	2
(Bosnia and Herzegovina) Zrinjski Mostar	3	1	0	2	66	80	−14	2
(Belarus) Druts	3	1	0	2	73	88	−15	2

=== Group B ===
Team	Pld	W	D	L	GF	GA	GD	Pts
(Croatia) Zelina	2	2	0	0	76	44	+32	4
(Portugal) Alavarium	2	1	0	1	60	50	+10	2
(United Kingdom) Olympia London	2	0	0	2	34	76	−42	0
(Greece) Panetolikos (walkover)	X	X	X	X	X	X	X	X

== Second qualifying round ==
Team #1	Agg.	Team #2	1st	2nd
HC Dnepryanka Kherson (Ukraine)	55–39	(Greece) PAOK	27–17	28–22
Kopavogur (Iceland)	40–85	(France) Fleury	22–39	18–46
Sokol Písek (Czech Republic)	81–35	(Austria) Dornbirn Schoren	32–11	49–24
Yellow Winterthur (Switzerland)	44–50	(Lithuania) Egle Vilnius	21–26	23–24
HC Victoria-Berestie (Belarus)	66–52	(Belgium) Fémina Visé	39–27	27–25
Aranđelovac (Serbia)	76–39	(Bosnia and Herzegovina) Ilidža	40–18	36–21
Baku (Azerbaijan)	41–62	(Croatia) Zelina	18–35	23–27
Lokomotiva Zagreb (Croatia)	70–44	(Turkey) Anadolu	33–21	37–23

== Round of 16 ==
Team #1	Agg.	Team #2	1st	2nd
HC Dnepryanka Kherson (Ukraine)	46–45	(Portugal) Juve Lis	25–24	21–21
Fleury (France)	94–37	(North Macedonia) Gevgelija	48–15	46–22
Sokol Písek (Czech Republic)	60–74	(Turkey) Muratpasa	31–37	29–37
Podatkovy Universitet (Ukraine)	68–59	(Lithuania) Egle Vilnius	40–30	28–29
HC Victoria-Berestie (Belarus)	50–67	(Czech Republic) Baník Most	26–32	24–35
Le Havre (France)	50–36	(Serbia) Aranđelovac	25–15	25–21
Zelina (Croatia)	55–52	(Poland) AZS Politechnika Koszalin	30–21	25–31
Crvena Zvezda (Serbia)	43–50	(Croatia) Lokomotiva Zagreb	21–26	22–24

== Quarter-finals ==
Team #1	Agg.	Team #2	1st	2nd
HC Dnepryanka Kherson (Ukraine)	38–75	(France) Fleury	21–38	17–37
Muratpasa (Turkey)	75–56	(Ukraine) Podatkovy Universitet	41–31	34–25
Baník Most (Czech Republic)	43–51	(France) Le Havre	18–23	25–28
Zelina (Croatia)	37–42	(Croatia) Lokomotiva Zagreb	24–23	13–19

== Semifinals ==
Team #1	Agg.	Team #2	1st	2nd
Fleury (France)	67–68	(Turkey) Muratpasa	30–29	37–39
Le Havre (France)	42–39	(Croatia) Lokomotiva Zagreb	23–17	19–22

== Finals ==
Team #1	Agg.	Team #2	1st	2nd
Muratpasa (Turkey)	57–63	(France) Le Havre	27–36	30–27
