= AC Alavarium =

Portuguese handball club

AC Alavarium (Portugal)
- Full name: Andebol Clube Alavarium Aveiro
- Founded: 1989
- Arena: Pavilhão Alavarium
- League: 1ª Divisão
- 2023-24: 1st(Honor Division)

Alavarium - Andebol Clube de Aveiro, also known as Alavarium/Love Tiles due to the team's sponsorship, is a women's handball club from Aveiro in Portugal. AC Alavarium competes in the 1ª Divisão.

== Honours ==
- 1ª Divisão
  - Winners (3) : 2013, 2014, 2015

== European record ==
Season	Competition	Round	Club	Home	Away	Aggregate
2011–12	Challenge Cup	Group B	(Greece) Panetolikos AC	10–0 (w/o)		2nd
2011–12	Challenge Cup	Group B	(United Kingdom) Olympia HC	34–16		2nd
2011–12	Challenge Cup	Group B	(Croatia) RK Zelina	26–34		2nd
2013–14	EHF Cup	R3	(Germany) TSV Bayer 04 Leverkusen	28–43	27–38	55–81
2014–15	EHF Cup	R3	(Romania) HC Dunărea Brăila	21–40	22–34	43–74
2015–16	EHF Cup	R2	(Bosnia and Herzegovina) ŽRK Ilidža	30–15	25–21	55–36
2015–16	EHF Cup	R3	(Hungary) Siófok KC	21–39	25–40	46–79
2016–17	EHF Cup	R1	(France) Nantes	16–47	11–34	27–81
2017–18	Challenge Cup	R3	(Serbia) ŽRK Bor RTB	26–26	29–26	55–52
2017–18	Challenge Cup	1/8	(Turkey) Ardesen GSK	27–41	22–34	49–75

== Team ==
=== Current squad ===
Squad for the 2016–17 season

Goalkeepers

- (Portugal) Isabel Gois
- (Portugal) Andreia Madail
- (Portugal) Inès Rocha

Wingers
RW

- (Portugal) Soraia Domingues
- (Portugal) Rebecca Freitas
- (Portugal) Ines Moleiro

LW

- (Portugal) Bruna Ferreira
- (Portugal) Filipa Fontes

Line players

- (Portugal) Soraia Fernandes
- (Portugal) Joana Ferreira
- (Portugal) Barbara Henriques

Back players
LB

- (Portugal) Ana Silva
- (Portugal) Mónica Soares

CB

- (Portugal) Maria Coelho
- (Portugal) Ana Rita Neves
- (Portugal) Rita Vieira

RB

- (Portugal) Patricia Fernandes
- (Portugal) Sara Sousa
