= ŽRK Ajdovščina =

Slovenian women handball club

ŽRK Mlinotest Ajdovščina
- Full name: Ženski rokometni klub Mlinotest Ajdovščina
- Founded: October 1958; 68 years ago
- Arena: Ajdovščina Sports Centre
- Capacity: 800
- President: Matej Ličen
- Head coach: Jan Žbogar
- League: Slovenian First League
- 2025–26: Slovenian First League, 2nd of 13

Ženski rokometni klub Ajdovščina (English: Ajdovščina Women's Handball Club) is a women's handball club from Ajdovščina, Slovenia. The club competes in the Slovenian First League under the name Mlinotest Ajdovščina due to sponsorship reasons.

== Honours ==
- Slovenian Cup

Winners (1): 2023–24
Runners-up (3): 1993–94, 2015–16, 2024–25

- Slovenian Supercup

Runners-up (1): 2026

== European record ==
All results list Mlinotest's goal tally first.

Season	Competition	Round	Club	1st leg	2nd leg	Aggregate
2015–16	Challenge Cup	R3	(Montenegro) Danilovgrad	30–24	22–18	52–42
2015–16	Challenge Cup	1/8	(Poland) EB Start Elbląg	22–28	22–26	44–54
2016–17	Challenge Cup	R3	(Turkey) Zagnosspor	25–22	23–21	48–43
2016–17	Challenge Cup	1/8	(Spain) Rocasa Gran Canara ACE	18–31	21–36	39–67
