= Zağnos SK (women's handball) =

Turkish handball club

- Full name: Zağnos Spor Kulübü
- Founded: 2014; 12 years ago
- League: Turkish Women's Handball Super League
- Club colours

Zağnos SK (Turkish: Zağnos Spor Kulübü) is the women's handball team of the same named club in Trabzon, Turkey. Club colors are red, blue, and white. The club is named after Zağnos Pasha (Turkish: Zağnos Paşa fl. 1446–1462 or 1469).

== Competitions ==
The women's handball branch was founded when the club Trabzon Hentbol Akademi SK, which played in the Turkish Women's Handball First League, was purchased and renamed Zağnos SK. The team finished the 2013–14 season as runner-up, failed to advance to the Super League after ranking the third place in the play-offs. However, they were promoted as placeholder for a team, which missed to apply on time. Thus, they played in the 2014–15 season for the first time in the Turkey Women's Super League. The team won the play-outs ranking first in the group and qualified to remain in the league.

== European record ==
Season	Competition	Round	Club	Home	Away	Aggregate
2016-17	Challenge Cup	R2	(Bosnia and Herzegovina) ŽRK Ilidža	33–23	37–16	70–39
2016-17	Challenge Cup	R3	(Slovenia) ŽRK Mlinotest Ajdovščina	22–25	21–23	43–48
2017–18	Challenge Cup	R3	(Switzerland) SPONO Eagles	23–20	35–28	58–48
2017–18	Challenge Cup	1/8	(Serbia) ŽORK Jagodina	26–29	34–24	60–53
2017–18	Challenge Cup	1/4	(Spain) Rocasa Gran Canaria ACE	20–25	25–37	45–62
