= 2017–18 Women's EHF Challenge Cup =

Women's EHF Challenge Cup
- 2017–18

Tournament information
- Sport: Handball
- Dates: 14 October 2017–13 May 2018
- Administrator: European Handball Federation

Final positions
- Champions: (Poland) MKS Selgros Lublin
- Runner-up: (Spain) Rocasa Gran Canaria ACE

The 2017–18 Women's EHF Challenge Cup is the 21st edition of the European Handball Federation's third-tier competition for women's handball clubs, running from 14 October 2017.

== Overview ==
Source: EHF

=== Team allocation ===
- TH: Title holders

Round 3
(Sweden) Boden Handboll IF	(Croatia) HC Lokomotiva Zagreb (TH)	(Switzerland) SPONO Eagles	(Kosovo) KHF Istogu
(Sweden) Kristianstad Handboll	(Spain) Rocasa Gran Canaria ACE	(Portugal) AC Alavarium / Love Tiles	(Kosovo) KHF Shqiponja
(North Macedonia) ŽRK Metalurg	(Spain) Rincón Fertilidad Málaga	(Portugal) ADA CJ Barros	(Israel) Maccabi Arazim Ramat Gan
(North Macedonia) ŽRK Kumanovo	(Netherlands) Virto/Quintus	(Greece) AC PAOK	(Lithuania) ACME-Žalgiris Kaunas
(Poland) MKS Selgros Lublin	(Netherlands) Maedilon / VZV	(Belgium) Fémina Visé	(United Kingdom) London GD Handball Club
(Turkey) Ardesen GSK	(Serbia) HC Naisa Niš	(Azerbaijan) AZERYOL Handball Club	(Bosnia and Herzegovina) ŽRK Jedinstvo Tuzla
(Turkey) Zagnosspor	(Serbia) ŽORK Jagodina	(Luxembourg) HB Dudelange	(Finland) HIFK
(Austria) ATV Trofaiach	(Switzerland) DHB Rotweiss Thun		
Round 2
(Austria) UHC Müllner Bau Stockerau	(Bosnia and Herzegovina) ŽRK Krivaja Zavidovići	(Moldova) HC Olimpus-85 SSSH-2	(Serbia) ŽRK Bor RTB

== Qualification stage ==
=== Round 2 ===
Teams listed first played the first leg at home. Bolded teams qualified into round 3.

Team 1	Agg.	Team 2	1st leg	2nd leg
ŽRK Krivaja Zavidovići (Bosnia and Herzegovina)	44–69	(Serbia) **ŽRK Bor RTB**	25–39	19–30
HC Olimpus-85 SSSH-2 (Moldova)	41–83^{a}	(Austria) **UHC Müllner Bau Stockerau**	20–46	21–37

Notes

^{a} Both legs were hosted by Stockerau.

=== Round 3 ===
Teams listed first played the first leg at home. Some teams agreed to play both matches in the same venue. Bolded teams qualified into last 16.

Team 1	Agg.	Team 2	1st leg	2nd leg
**AC PAOK** (Greece)	54–48	(Bosnia and Herzegovina) ŽRK Jedinstvo Tuzla	24–17	30–31
**Rincón Fertilidad Málaga** (Spain)	68–28^{a}	(North Macedonia) ŽRK Metalurg	31–14	37–14
ATV Trofaiach (Austria)	39–60	(Serbia) **ŽORK Jagodina**	20–29	19–31
Fémina Visé (Belgium)	23–52^{b}	(Sweden) **Kristianstad Handboll**	13–27	10–25
**HC Lokomotiva Zagreb** (Croatia)	61–38	(Austria) UHC Müllner Bau Stockerau	24–19	37–19
**MKS Selgros Lublin** (Poland)	95–31^{c}	(North Macedonia) ŽRK Kumanovo	54–13	41–18
**ADA CJ Barros** (Portugal)	75–38^{d}	(Kosovo) KHF Shqiponja	38–16	37–22
Maccabi Arazim Ramat Gan (Israel)	43–53^{e}	(Serbia) **HC Naisa Niš**	23–28	20–25
**Boden Handboll IF** (Sweden)	62–42	(Finland) HIFK	34–21	28–21
KHF Istogu (Kosovo)	34–76^{f}	(Netherlands) **Virto/Quintus**	13–36	21–40
**AC Alavarium / Love Tiles** (Portugal)	55–52^{g}	(Serbia) ŽRK Bor RTB	26–26	29–26
**Ardesen GSK** (Turkey)	59–40	(Switzerland) DHB Rotweiss Thun	36–17	23–23
Maedilon / VZV (Netherlands)	44–64	(Spain) **Rocasa Gran Canaria ACE**	26–32	18–32
**ACME-Žalgiris Kaunas** (Lithuania)	74–34	(United Kingdom) London GD Handball Club	42–13	32–21
SPONO Eagles (Switzerland)	48–58^{h}	(Turkey) **Zagnosspor**	28–35	20–23
HB Dudelange (Luxembourg)	31–68^{i}	(Azerbaijan) **AZERYOL Handball Club**	15–36	16–32

Notes

^{a} Both legs were hosted by Rincón Fertilidad Málaga.
^{b} Both legs were hosted by Kristianstad.
^{c} Both legs were hosted by MKS Selgros Lublin.
^{d} Both legs were hosted by ADA Colegio João Barros.
^{e} Both legs were hosted by HC Naisa Niš.
^{f} Both legs were hosted by Virto/Quintus.
^{g} Both legs were hosted by AC Alavarium / Love Tiles.
^{h} Both legs were hosted by Zagnosspor.
^{i} Both legs were hosted by HB Dudelange.

== Knockout stage ==
=== Last 16 ===
Teams listed first played the first leg at home. Some teams agreed to play both matches in the same venue. Bolded teams qualified into quarterfinals.

Team 1	Agg.	Team 2	1st leg	2nd leg
ŽORK Jagodina (Serbia)	53–60	(Turkey) **Zagnosspor**	24–34	29–26
**Kristianstad Handboll** (Sweden)	57–41^{a}	(Azerbaijan) AZERYOL Handball Club	30–23	27–18
AC Alavarium / Love Tiles (Portugal)	49–75	(Turkey) **Ardesen GSK**	27–41	22–34
AC PAOK (Greece)	37–70^{b}	(Croatia) **HC Lokomotiva Zagreb**	17–37	20–33
**Virto/Quintus** (Netherlands)	74–56^{c}	(Serbia) HC Naisa Niš	35–25	39–31
Boden Handboll IF (Sweden)	45–50	(Spain) **Rocasa Gran Canaria ACE**	26–31	19–19
ACME-Žalgiris Kaunas (Lithuania)	48–49	(Spain) **Rincón Fertilidad Málaga**	28–24	20–25
**MKS Selgros Lublin** (Poland)	73–24^{d}	(Portugal) ADA CJ Barros	36–12	37–12

Notes
^{a} Both legs were hosted by AZERYOL Handball Club.
^{b} Both legs were hosted by HC Lokomotiva Zagreb.
^{c} Both legs were hosted by Virto/Quintus.
^{d} Both legs were hosted by MKS Selgros Lublin.

=== Quarterfinals ===
Teams listed first played the first leg at home. Bolded teams qualified into semifinals.

Team 1	Agg.	Team 2	1st leg	2nd leg
**Ardesen GSK** (Turkey)	51–51	(Sweden) Kristianstad Handboll	23–26	28–25
Zagnosspor (Turkey)	45–62^{a}	(Spain) **Rocasa Gran Canaria ACE**	20–25	25–37
**HC Lokomotiva Zagreb** (Croatia)	53–41	(Netherlands) Virto/Quintus	26–17	27–24
**MKS Selgros Lublin** (Poland)	45–39^{a}	(Spain) Rincón Fertilidad Málaga	18–19	27–20

Notes
^{a} Both legs were hosted by Rocasa Gran Canaria ACE.
^{b} Both legs were hosted by Rincón Fertilidad Málaga.

=== Semifinals ===
Team 1	Agg.	Team 2	1st leg	2nd leg
Ardesen GSK (Turkey)	48–59	(Poland) **MKS Selgros Lublin**	28–23	20–36
HC Lokomotiva Zagreb (Croatia)	51–51	(Spain) **Rocasa Gran Canaria ACE**	26–26	25–25

=== Final ===
Team 1	Agg.	Team 2	1st leg	2nd leg
Rocasa Gran Canaria ACE (Spain)	45–49	(Poland) **MKS Selgros Lublin**	22–22	23–27

== See also ==
- 2017–18 Women's EHF Champions League
- 2017–18 Women's EHF Cup
