= HC Svilengrad =

Bulgarian woman's handball club

- Full name: Handball Klub Svilengrad
- Founded: 2014; 12 years ago
- Head coach: Pavel Dzhenev
- League: GHR A
- 2015–2016: 2nd

Handball Klub Svilengrad is a women's handball club from Svilengrad in Bulgaria. HC Svilengrad competes in the GHR A.

== European record ==
Season	Competition	Round	Club	Home	Away	Aggregate
2016–17	Challenge Cup	R3	(North Macedonia) HC Vardar SCJS	17–24	22–29	39–53

== Team ==
=== Current squad ===
Squad for the 2016–17 season

Goalkeepers

- (Bulgaria) Gergana Aleksandrova
- (Bulgaria) Galya Balamova
- (Bulgaria) Totka Doykinova
- (Bulgaria) Rosina Hristova Nenova
- (Bulgaria) Desislava Todorova

Wingers
RW

- (Bulgaria) Rayna Georgieva
- (Bulgaria) Monika Radeva

LW

- (Bulgaria) Miglena Hristova

Line Players

- (Bulgaria) Ralitsa Dimitrova
- (Bulgaria) Roksana Radeva

Back players
LB

- (Bulgaria) Stefka Agova

CB

- (Bulgaria) Deniza Asenova
- (Bulgaria) Desislava Ilieva

RB

- (Bulgaria) Kristina Milanova
- (Ukraine) Ganna Zakharova
