= UHC Stockerau =

- Full name: UHC Stockerau
- Founded: 1946
- Arena: Sporthalle Alte Au
- Head coach: Moshe Haleperin
- League: Women Handball Liga Austria
- 2021–22: 7th

UHC Stockerau, also known as UHC Müllner Bau Stockerau, is a handball club from Stockerau in Austria. Women's UHC Stockerau competes in the Women Handball Liga Austria.

== Honours ==
=== Women's handball ===
- Women Handball Austria:
  - Runners-up (1): 2018
- ÖHB Cup:
  - Winners (1): 2018
  - Runners-up (1): 2022

== European record ==
Season	Competition	Round	Club	Home	Away	Aggregate
1997–98	EHF Cup Winners' Cup	1/16	(Slovakia) HC Plastika Nitra	21–22	20–27	41–49
1998–99	EHF Champions League	1/16	(Lithuania) Eglė Vilnius	23–22	18–23	41–45
1999–00	EHF Cup Winners' Cup	1/16	(Georgia (country)) Kolkheti Poti	38–14	38–18	76–32
1999–00	EHF Cup Winners' Cup	1/8	(Norway) Nordstrand Oslo	23–30	19–35	42–65
2016–17	Challenge Cup	R3	(Poland) Kram Start Elbląg	17–28	20–33	37–61
2017–18	Challenge Cup	R2	(Moldova) HC Olimpus-85 SSSH-2	37–21	46–20	83–41
2017–18	Challenge Cup	R3	(Croatia) HC Lokomotiva Zagreb	19–37	19–24	38–61
2018–19	EHF Cup	R1	(Czech Republic) DHC Slavia Praha	30–24	23–32	53–56

== Team ==
=== Current squad ===
Squad for the 2022–23 season

Goalkeepers

- 1 (North Macedonia) Mateja Serafimova
- 12 (Austria) Isabel Bernhard

Wingers
RW

- 6 (Austria) Laura Klinger
- 19 (Austria) Nina Müller
- 23 (Austria) Viktoria Mauler

LW

- 7 (Austria) Ines Rein

Line Players

- 17 (Austria) Carina Ganl
- 21 (Slovakia) Diana Michalkova

Back players
LB

- 5 (Austria) Sandra Hart
- 25 (Austria) Maria Lauermann
- 99 (Austria) Melissa Begovic

CB

- 3 (Austria) Sandra Zeitelberger
- 13 (Slovakia) Dominika Kodajova
- 20 (Austria) Anna Habermüller

RB

- 9 (Austria) Hanna Feuerstein
- 29 (Austria) Theres Kovarik

=== Transfers ===
Transfers for the 2023-24 season

Joining

Leaving
