= DHB Rotweiss Thun =

Swiss handball club

- Full name: DHB Rotweiss Thun
- Founded: 1970; 56 years ago
- Arena: Gotthelf-Halle Thun
- Head coach: Yvonne Leuthold
- League: Spar Premium League
- 2015-2016: 4th
- Club colours
Home	Away

DHB Rotweiss Thun is a women's handball club from Thun in Switzerland. DHB Rotweiss Thun competes in the Spar Premium League.

Founded in 1970, they have played in the top division since 1993.

Location of Rotweiss Thun

== Kits ==
HOME

2018–

AWAY

2020–

== European record ==
Season	Competition	Round	Club	Home	Away	Aggregate
2014–15	Challenge Cup	R3	(Switzerland) Yellow Winterthur	16–17	18–23	34–40
2015–16	Challenge Cup	R3	(Turkey) Izmir BB GSK	23–27	17–27	40–54
2016–17	Challenge Cup	R2	(Italy) ASD Ariosta P. Ferrara	34–17	28–24	56–41
2016–17	Challenge Cup	R3	(Ukraine) HC Karpaty	25–34	17–20	42–54
2017–18	Challenge Cup	R3	(Turkey) Ardesen GSK	23–23	17–36	40–59
2018–19	Challenge Cup	R3	(Spain) Rincón Fertilidad Málaga	28–28	22–25	50–53

== Team ==
=== Current squad ===
Squad for the 2016–17 season

Goalkeepers

- (Slovenia) Karmen Korenic
- (Switzerland) Julia Kuslys
- (Switzerland) Sibylle Peronino

Wingers
RW

- (Switzerland) Selina Jordi
- (Switzerland) Adriana Lehmann

LW

- (Switzerland) Maura Noemi Feuz
- (Switzerland) Annina Ganz
- (Switzerland) Julia Hess
- (Switzerland) Michelle Schmied

Line players

- (Switzerland) Fabiola Hostettler
- (Switzerland) Helen Moser
- (Chile) Gisele Andrea Angel Galaz

Back players
LB

- (Slovenia) Teja Ferfolja
- (Switzerland) Nina Lisa Gerber
- (Serbia) Tanja Marjanac
- (Switzerland) Rebecca Wyer

CB

- (Switzerland) Jana Karlen
- (Switzerland) Desiree Knecht
- (Switzerland) Celine Oberson
- (Switzerland) Kira Zumstein

RB

- (Switzerland) Laura Berger
