= Zağnos SK =

Zağnosspor
- Zağnosspor
- Full name: Zağnos Spor Kulübü
- Short name: ZS
- Founded: 2014
- Ground: 19 Mayıs Sports Hall, Yavuz Selim Stadium
- Owner: Emre Aksoy
- Chairman: Emre Aksoy
- Manager: Fatih Yılmaz
- League: Turkish Women's Handball Super League, Turkish Men's Handball Super League, Trabzon 1st Amateur Cluster
- Website: http://zagnossporkulubu.com/

Zağnosspor (Turkish: Zağnos Spor Kulübü) is a multi-sports club established in Trabzon, Turkey. The club is active in the branches football, men's and women's handball, volleyball, boxing and swimming. The club is named after Zağnos Pasha (Turkish: Zağnos Paşa fl. 1446–1462 or 1469), who served as the sanjak-bey of the city following the conquest of Trabzon by the Ottoman Turks in 1461. Its colors are red, blue and white.

The club's president is Emre Aksoy, chairman of AKS Group Construction.

The club is best known for their women's handball team playing in the Turkish Women's Handball Super League.
