= Ardeşen GSK =

- Full name: Ardeşen Gençlik ve Spor Kulübü
- Short name: Ardeşen GSK
- Founded: 2008
- Arena: Ardeşen RTEÜ MYO Hall
- President: Sultan Rauf Oğuz
- Head coach: Ali İhsan Tekin
- Captain: Perihan Topaloğlu

Ardeşen GSK (Turkish: Ardeşen Gençlik ve Spor Kulübü, lit. 'Ardeşen Youth and Sports Club') is a women's handball club from Ardeşen in Rize Province, Turkey. Founded in 2008, the team play their home matches in the Ardeşen RTEÜ MYO Hall. Club chairman is Sultan Rauf Oğuz. The team is managed by Hikmet Vurgun. The team is nicknamed "Dişi Atmacalar" ("Female Hawks").

== Club colors and logo ==
The club's colors are maroon and white.

The logo of the club is composed of a maroon-colored circle with the club's title and foundation year on it in white, which frames a hawk head and the club's initials both resembling a powerful handball shoot.

== Competitions ==
=== Domestic ===
The team played in the Turkish Women's Handball League from 2008 until their promotion to the Turkish Women's Handball Super League in the 2012–13 season. In the 2013–14 season, they finished the league at third place. Ardeşen GSK ranked fourth in the 2014–15 league losing in the play-off to Kastamonu Bld. GSK.

=== International ===
Ardeşen GSK played in the 2013–14 Women's EHF Challenge Cup and advanced to the quarterfinals, however they were defeated by the Swedish team H 65 Höör. They failed to advance to the semifinals in the 2014–15 Women's EHF Challenge Cup losing to the Polish team Pogoń Baltica Szczecin by 57–59. The team lost to the Russian HC Lada Togliatti by 50–80 in the last 16 of 2015–16 Women's EHF Cup Winners' Cup's knockout stage.

== European record ==
Season	Competition	Round	Club	1st leg	2nd leg	Aggregate
2013–14	Challenge Cup	1/8	(Serbia) HC Naisa Niš	26–27	30–25	56–52
2013–14	Challenge Cup	1/4	(Sweden) H 65 Höör	22–29	21–26	43–55
2014–15	Challenge Cup	R3	(Poland) Energa AZS Koszalin	34–27	31–31	65–58
2014–15	Challenge Cup	1/8	(Croatia) RK Zelina	32–29	28–30	60–59
2014–15	Challenge Cup	1/4	(Poland) Pogoń Baltica Szczecin	31–28	26–31	57–59
2015–16	EHF Cup Winners' Cup	R2	(Sweden) Skuru IK	32–20	25–30	57–50
2015–16	EHF Cup Winners' Cup	R3	(Denmark) Team Esbjerg	31–22	26–30	57–52
2015–16	EHF Cup Winners' Cup	1/8	(Russia) Handball Club Lada	22–31	28–49	50–80
2016-17	Challenge Cup	R3	(Montenegro) ŽRK Danilovgrad	30–23	28–24	58–47
2016-17	Challenge Cup	1/8	(Croatia) HC Lokomotiva Zagreb	25–33	20–24	45–57
2017–18	Challenge Cup	R3	(Switzerland) DHB Rotweiss Thun	36–17	23–23	59–40
2017–18	Challenge Cup	1/8	(Portugal) AC Alavarium / Love Tiles	34–22	41–27	75–49
2017–18	Challenge Cup	1/4	(Sweden) Kristianstad Handboll	23–26	28–25	51–51
2017–18	Challenge Cup	1/2	(Poland) MKS Selgros Lublin	28–23	20–36	48–59

== Notable former players ==
- (Turkey) Aslı İskit (born 1993)
- (Montenegro) Sandra Nikčević (born 1984)
- (Turkey) Fatmagül Sakızcan (born 1992)

== Honours ==
Turkish Women's Handball Super League

- Third place (1): 2013–14
