= Aleksandra Stokłosa =

Polish handball player (born 1999)

Personal information
- Nationality: Polish
- Born: 16 April 1999 (age 27) Tarnów, Poland
- Height: 1.78 m (5 ft 10 in)

Sport
- Sport: Handball
- Position: Line player
- Current club: Start Elbląg

Senior clubs
- Years: Team
- –2018: Start Elbląg
- 2018–2019: CS Universitatea Cluj-Napoca
- 2019–: Start Elbląg
National team
- Years: Team
- –: Poland B

Aleksandra Stokłosa (born 16 April 1999) is a Polish handballer who plays for Start Elbląg.

== Achievements ==
- Ekstraklasa:
  - Bronze Medalist: 2017

== International career ==
In 2016, Stokłosa was named in Leszek Krowicki's preliminary squad for the 2016 European Championship.
