= Marieke van der Wal =

Dutch handball player (born 1979)

Personal information
- Nationality: Dutch
- Born: 7 November 1979 (age 46) Delft, Netherlands
- Height: 1.83 m (6 ft 0 in)

Sport
- Sport: Handball
- Position: Goalkeeper

Senior clubs
- Years: Team
- 1998–2003: Van der Voort/Quintus
- 2003–2005: V&L Geleen
- 2005–2007: Borussia Dortmund
- 2007–2009: CB Elche
- 2009–2010: SD Itxako
- 2010–2010: Frisch Auf Göppingen
- 2010–2011: Le Havre AC
- 2011–2014: Cergy-Pontoise
- 2014–2016: Virto/Quintus
National team
Years	Team	Apps	(Gls)
2000–2015	Netherlands	196	(0)
Medal record
World Championship
Silver medal – second place	2015 Denmark

Marieke van der Wal (born 1979) is a retired Dutch handball goalkeeper. She played on the Dutch national team and participated at the 2011 World Women's Handball Championship in Brazil.
