= Sandra Nikčević =

Montenegrin handball player (born 1984)

Personal information
- Nationality: Montenegrin
- Born: 16 November 1984 (age 41) Titograd, SR Montenegro, SFR Yugoslavia
- Height: 1.87 m (6 ft 2 in)

Sport
- Sport: Handball
- Position: Left back
- Current club: Osmangazi Belediyespor

Senior clubs
- Years: Team
- 2010–2011: RK Podravka Vegeta
- 2011–2012: Alcoa FKC
- 2012–2013: HC Astrakhanochka
- 2013–2014: Ipress Center-Vác
- 2014–2015: Ardeşen GSK
- 2015–2016: Osmangazi Belediyespor
National team
Years	Team	Apps	(Gls)
2010-2013	Montenegro	22	(18)
Medal record
European Championship
Gold medal – first place	2012 Serbia	Team
- Updated on 4 December 2012

Sandra Nikčević (Montenegrin Cyrillic: Сандра Никчевић, born 16 November 1984) is a Montenegrin former handballer, who played for the Montenegrin national team.

She was part of the Montenegrin team that won their first ever international title at the 2012 European Women's Handball Championship.

She was in Croatia with RK Podravka Vegeta (2010–11), in Hungary with Alcoa FKC (2011–12) and Ipress Center-Vác (2013–14), in Russia with HC Astrakhanochka (2012–13) before she moved to Turkey to play in the 2011–12 season of the Turkish Women's Handball Super League for the Rize-based Ardeşen GSK. In August 2015, she transferred to Osmangazi Belediyespor in Bursa.

== Achievements ==
- Croatian Championship:
  - Winner: 2011
- Croatian Cup:
  - Winner: 2011
- European Championship:
  - Winner: 2012
