= KHF Shqiponja =

Kosovan women's handball club

- Full name: Klubi Hendbollistik; Shqiponja Gjakovë
- Founded: 2000; 25 years ago
- Arena: Palestra Sportive "Shani Nushi"
- League: SuperLiga e femrave e Kosoves

KHF Shqiponja is a women's handball club from Gjakova in western Kosovo. KHF Shqiponja competes in the SuperLiga e femrave e Kosoves and the Kosovo Handball Women's Cup.

== European record ==
Season	Competition	Round	Club	1st leg	2nd leg	Aggregate
2016-17	Challenge Cup	R3	(Israel) Maccabi Arazim Ramat Gan	30–31	29–28	59–59
2016-17	Challenge Cup	1/8	(Czech Republic) DHC Sokol Poruba	18–51	22–46	40–97
2017–18	Challenge Cup	R3	(Portugal) ADA CJ Barros	16–38	22–37	38–75

== Team ==
=== Current squad ===
Squad for the 2016–17 season

Goalkeepers

- (Kosovo) Xhylshahe Bajramaj
- (Montenegro) Andjela Pjescic
- (Kosovo) Valbona Rudaku

Wingers
RW

- (Kosovo) Dafina Gashi
- (Kosovo) Mane Ibrahimi
- (Kosovo) Donika Karaqi

LW

- (Kosovo) Albulena Basha
- (Kosovo) Valerina Malaj

Line players

- (Kosovo) Mergime Aliqkaj
- (Kosovo) Fitore Berisha
- (Kosovo) Donjeta Cekaj
- (Kosovo) Blerina Haxha
- (Kosovo) Erolinda Kuqi
- (Kosovo) Shkurte Mehmeti

Back players
LB

- (Kosovo) Xhevahire Bajramaj
- (Kosovo) Edonjeta Mustafa
- (Kosovo) Ramize Rexhepi

CB

- (North Macedonia) Belma Beba
- (Kosovo) Alma Nivokazi
- (Kosovo) Shqipe Tahiri

RB

- (Kosovo) Shpresa Fazlija
- (Kosovo) Albulena Kelmendi
- (Kosovo) Ernesa Mustafa
