= Kristianstad Handboll =

Swedish handball club

- Full name: Kristianstad Handbollsklubb
- Short name: KHK
- Founded: 15 June 2005; 21 years ago
- Arena: Kristianstad Idrotshall
- Capacity: 2,200
- President: Sam Giertz
- Head coach: Ulf Larsson
- League: Handbollsligan
- 2025-26: 10th
- Club colours
Home	Away

Kristianstad Handbollsklubb is a Swedish women's handball club from Kristianstad. The club was founded on 15 June 2005, when IFK Ungdom parted ways with IFK Kristianstad. They are currently competing in the women's Handbollsligan as of the 2026/27 season.

== History ==
The club was first promoted to the Allsvenskan in 2013. In 2014, they finished second, but missed promotion to the top flight after losing the playoff against BK Heid. In 2015, promotion was finally achieved.

In 2019, the team were relegated again after taking only 7 points in the 2018-19 league season. After only a year, they were promoted once again.

== Kits ==
HOME

2020-

AWAY
2017-18	2018-19

== European record ==
Season	Competition	Round	Club	Home	Away	Aggregate
2017–18	Challenge Cup	R3	(Belgium) Fémina Visé	25–10	27–13	52–23
2017–18	Challenge Cup	1/8	(Azerbaijan) Baku	30–23	27–18	57–41
2017–18	Challenge Cup	1/4	(Turkey) Ardeşen	25–28	26–23	51–51

== Team ==
=== Current squad ===
Squad for the 2026–27 season.

Goalkeepers

- 1 (Sweden) Lova Jönsson
- 22 (Sweden) Miranda Nasser

Wingers
RW

- 5 (Sweden) Linnea Sundholm
- 24 (Sweden) Wilma Gustafsson
- 27 (Sweden) Nova Lindberg

LW

- 11 (Denmark) Laura Eggert
- 74 (Sweden) Wilma Martinsson

Line players

- 2 (Sweden) Ella Hansson
- 14 (Sweden) Maja Hedberg (c)

Back players
LB

- 9 (Norway) Malin Iversen
- 15 (Finland) Patricia Anckar
- 17 (Sweden) Agnes Karlsson

CB

- 9 (Sweden) Linn Andresen
- 25 (Sweden) Mimi Olesand
- 39 (Sweden) Wilda Jönsson

RB

- 7 (Sweden) Alva Söderbom
- 8 (Sweden) Maja Winberg

=== Transfers ===
Transfers for the 2027-28 season.

Joining

Leaving

== Former club members ==
=== Notable former players ===
- (Czech Republic) Lucie Satrapova (2015-2018)
- (Czech Republic) Petra Kudláčková (2018-2021)
- (Turkey) Asli Iskit (2016-2018)
- (Sweden) Sarah Carlström (2011–2012, 2013–2019, 2020–)
- (Iceland) Andrea Jacobsen (2018-2022)
- (Serbia) Sanja Radosavljević (2023-2024)
