= Maccabi Arazim Ramat Gan =

Israeli handball club

- Full name: Maccabi Arazim Ramat Gan
- League: Ligat Ha'Al
- 2015-2016: 3rd

Maccabi Arazim Ramat Gan is a handball club from Ramat Gan in Israel. Maccabi Arazim Ramat Gan competes in the Ligat Ha'Al.

== Honours ==
- Ligat Ha'Al
  - Winners (16) : 1968, 1969, 1970, 1971, 1978, 1980, 1981, 1982, 1983, 1984, 1985, 1986, 1989, 2018, 2019, 2025
- Israel Handball Cup
  - Winners (6) : 1970, 1980, 1981, 1983, 1984, 1986

== European record ==
Season	Competition	Round	Club	Home	Away	Aggregate
2016-17	Challenge Cup	R3	(Kosovo) KHF Shqiponja	31–30	28–29	59–59
2017–18	Challenge Cup	R3	(Serbia) HC Naisa Niš	23–28	20–25	43–53
2025–26	EHF Women's European Cup	R2	(Serbia) Bor	21–24	26–32	47–56

== Team ==
=== Current squad ===
Squad for the 2016–17 season

Goalkeepers

- (Israel) Rotem Gershon
- (Israel) Analia Grauer

Wingers
RW

- (Israel) Liron Nimni

LW

- (Israel) Danielle Danan
- (Israel) Hadar Dorenboust
- (Israel) Nicole Padalon

Line Players

- (Israel) Elina Farbman
- (Israel) Shani Rahel Levinkind
- (Israel) Nofar Ruf

Back players
LB

- (Belarus) Yuliya Bulava

CB

- (Hungary) Julianna Banczik
- (Israel) Ortal Elbaz
- (Israel) Elena Rozenshtein

RB

- (Israel) Sharon Akler
- (Israel) Oshri Cohen
- (Russia) Ekaterina Melnik
