= DHC Sokol Poruba =

- Full name: DHC Sokol Poruba z.s.
- Founded: 1997 / 2019
- League: WHIL; Czech League
- 2011–12: WHIL: 4th Czech League: 1st
- Club colours
Home	Away

DHC Sokol Poruba is a Czech women's handball club from Ostrava's Poruba district originally established as BK Ostrava (a.k.a. Cosmetic Ostrava for sponsorship reasons) in 1997. BK Ostrava won the national championship in its two first seasons, taking part in the Champions League. In 2010 it was disbanded and refounded, taking its current name.

In 2012 the team won its third league. The 2012–13 EHF Cup will mark its debut in EHF competitions under its current form.

== Titles ==
- Czech League
  - 1997, 1998, 2012

== European record ==
Season	Competition	Round	Club	1st leg	2nd leg	Aggregate
2016-17	Challenge Cup	R3	(Georgia (country)) HC Mamuli	34–12	31–7	65–19
2016-17	Challenge Cup	1/8	(Kosovo) KHF Shqiponja	51–18	46–22	97–40
2016-17	Challenge Cup	1/4	(Poland) Kram Start Elbląg	24–29	27–14	51–43
2016-17	Challenge Cup	1/2	(Sweden) H 65 Höör	16–28	14–22	30–50
