= Vitaral Jelfa Jelenia Góra =

Polish handball club

MKS Karkonosze Jelenia Góra
- Full name: MKS Karkonosze Jelenia Góra
- Founded: 1982; 44 years ago

MKS Karkonosze Jelenia Góra is a Polish women's handball team, based in Jelenia Góra.

== See also ==
- Handball in Poland
- Sports in Poland
