= ŽRK Ilidža =

- Full name: Ženski rukometni klub Ilidža
- Arena: KSIRC Hadzici
- League: Premijer liga BiH

ŽRK Ilidža is a women's handball club from Ilidža in Bosnia and Herzegovina. ŽRK Ilidža competes in the Premijer liga BiH handball league.

== Honours ==
- First League of Federation of Bosnia and Herzegovina
  - Winners (1): 2021

== European record ==
Season	Competition	Round	Club	Home	Away	Aggregate
2016-17	Challenge Cup	R2	(Turkey) Zagnosspor	23–33	16–37	39–70

== Recent seasons ==
The recent season-by-season performance of the club:

Season	Division	Tier	Position
2020–21	Prva liga FBiH	II	1st ↑

Key

↑ Promoted	↓ Relegated
