= SSV Dornbirn Schoren =

Austrian handball club

- Full name: SSV Dornbirn Schoren
- Founded: 1984; 41 years ago
- Arena: Messehalle 2 Dornbirn
- League: HLA Challenge League
- 2022-2023: 12th (relegated)

SSV Dornbirn Schoren is a women's handball club from Dornbirn in Austria. UHC Stockerau competes in the HLA Challenge League, the second tier of Austrian handball. They were relegated in the 2022-23 season after 27 years in the top division.

== European record ==
| Season | Competition | Round | Club | Home | Away | Aggregate |
|---|---|---|---|---|---|---|
| 2016-17 | Challenge Cup | R2 | (Portugal) CS Madeira | 34-36 | 20-30 | 54-66 |

== Team ==
=== Current squad ===
Squad for the 2019-20 season

Goalkeepers

- 44 (Montenegro) ANJELA ROGANOVIC
- 1 (Austria) KATJA RAUTER

Wingers
RW

- 14 (Austria) LEONIE GERBIS
- 6 (Austria) SARA KOJIC

LW

- 20 (Austria) MARIE HUBER
- 7 (Austria) Sophie Ölz

Line Players

- 77 (Austria) KATARINA GLADOVIC
- 33 (Austria) KIM GANDER

Back players
LB

- 81 (Austria) ADRIANA MARKSTEINER
- 15 (Austria) BEATRIX KERESTEĹY
- 23 (Austria) Julia Marksteiner

CB

- 18 (Austria) FRANZISKA AMANN

RB

- 17 (Netherlands) NAOMI BENNEKER
- 4 (Switzerland) MALINA KELLENBERGER
