= 2015–16 Women's EHF Cup Winners' Cup =

Women's EHF Cup Winners' Cup
- 2015-16

Tournament information
- Sport: Handball
- Dates: 17 October 2015–7 May 2016

Final positions
- Champions: (Denmark) Team Tvis Holstebro
- Runner-up: (Russia) Handball Club Lada

Tournament statistics
- Top scorer: (Sweden) Nathalie Hagman (75 goals)

The 2015–16 EHF Women's Cup Winners' Cup was the 40th edition of the tournament that is organized by the European Handball Federation for the domestic cup winners in the continent.

== Round and draw dates ==
All draws held at the European Handball Federation headquarters in Vienna, Austria.

Round	Draw date	First leg	Second leg
Round 2	22 July 2015	17–24 October 2015	18–25 October 2015
Round 3	22 July 2015	14–21 November 2015	15–22 November 2015
Last 16	25 November 2015	9–10 January 2016	16–17 January 2016
Quarter-final	19 January 2016	20-21 February 2016	27-29 February 2016
Semi-finals	19 January 2016	2-3 April 2016	9-10 April 2016
Finals			

== Qualification stage ==
=== Round 2 ===
Teams listed first played the first leg at home. Some teams agreed to play both matches in the same venue. Bolded teams qualified into the third round.

Team 1	Agg.	Team 2	1st leg	2nd leg
**ZRK Umag** (Croatia)	54–51^{a}	(Switzerland) LK Zug	29–27	25–24
Skuru IK (Sweden)	50–57	(Turkey) **Ardeşen GSK**	30–25	20–32
Bnei Herzliya (Israel)	49–72^{b}	(Spain) **Mecalia Atletico Guardes**	23–39	26–33
Westfriesland SEW (Netherlands)	49–57	(North Macedonia) **WHC Metalurg**	23–24	26–33
**Yenimahalle Bld. SK** (Turkey)	76–39^{c}	(Austria) SSV Dornbirn Schoren	36–25	40–14
Jomi Salerno (Italy)	30–61^{d}	(Serbia) **ŽKK Radnički Kragujevac**	22–35	8–26

Notes
^{a} Both legs were hosted by LK Zug Handball.
^{b} Both legs were hosted by Mecalia Atletico Guardes.
^{c} Both legs were hosted by Yenimahalle Bld. SK
^{d} Both legs were hosted by WHC Radnicki Kragujevac.

=== Round 3 ===
Teams listed first played the first leg at home. Some teams agreed to play both matches in the same venue. Bolded teams qualified into last 16.

Team 1	Agg.	Team 2	1st leg	2nd leg
Team Esbjerg (Denmark)	52–57	(Turkey) **Ardeşen GSK**	30–26	22–31
**Team Tvis Holstebro** (Denmark)	73–40^{a}	(North Macedonia) WHC Metalurg	41–20	32–20
ŽKK Radnički Kragujevac (Serbia)	46–56^{b}	(Romania) **SC Municipal Craiova**	22–28	24–28
**SERCODAK Dalfsen** (Netherlands)	47–47 (a)	(Poland) Vistal Gdynia	20–21	27–26
**Vipers Kristiansand** (Norway)	47–39	(Norway) Halden Damer Elite	25–19	22–20
**Yenimahalle Bld. SK** (Turkey)	49–46	(Belarus) BNTU-BelAZ Minsk Reg.	26–20	23–26
Metz Handball (France)	47–52	(Denmark) **Viborg HK**	26–24	21–28
**Glassverket** (Norway)	81–37	(Serbia) ZORK Jagodina	43–14	38–23
Buxtehuder SV (Germany)	51–56	(France) **Issy-Paris Hand**	26–28	25–28
ZRK Umag (Croatia)	42–67^{c}	(Hungary) **Érd NK**	24–36	18–31
**Zvezda Zvenigorod** (Russia)	51–47^{d}	(Spain) Mecalia Atletico Guardes	29–25	22–22
**Handball Club Lada** (Russia)	67–58	(Germany) VfL Oldenburg	37–24	30–34

Notes

^{a} Both legs were hosted by Team Tvis Holstebro.
^{b} Both legs were hosted by SC Municipal Craiova.
^{c} Both legs were hosted by ÉRD HC.
^{d} Both legs were hosted by Mecalia Atletico Guardes.

== Last 16 ==
Teams listed first played the first leg at home. Bolded teams qualified into quarter-finals.

Team 1	Agg.	Team 2	1st leg	2nd leg
SC Municipal Craiova (Romania)	53–56	(Slovenia) **RK Krim**	30–29	23–27
SERCODAK Dalfsen (Netherlands)	40–54	(Hungary) **Érd NK**	15–27	25–27
Yenimahalle Bld. SK (Turkey)	58–59	(Russia) **Zvezda Zvenigorod**	33–26	25–33
**Vipers Kristiansand** (Norway)	50–47	(Poland) MKS Selgros Lublin	28–22	22–25
Glassverket IF (Norway)	50–52	(Denmark) **Viborg HK**	28–29	22–23
**Handball Club Lada** (Russia)	80–50	(Turkey) Ardeşen GSK	49–28	31–22
**Issy-Paris Hand** (France)	41–40	(Croatia) HC Podravka Vegeta	24–20	17–20
**Team Tvis Holstebro** (Denmark)	77–56	(Austria) Hypo Niederösterreich	42–28	35–28

=== Quarter-finals ===
Teams listed first played the first leg at home. Bolded teams qualified into semi-finals.

Team 1	Agg.	Team 2	1st leg	2nd leg
**Team Tvis Holstebro** (Denmark)	50–41	(Denmark) Viborg HK	25–14	25–27
Érd NK (Hungary)	46–46(a)	(France) **Issy-Paris Hand**	29–28	17–18
Vipers Kristiansand (Norway)	49–57	(Slovenia) **RK Krim**	29–27	20–30
Zvezda Zvenigorod (Russia)	51–76	(Russia) **Handball Club Lada**	30–43	21–33

=== Semi-finals ===
Teams listed first played the first leg at home. Bolded teams qualified into semi-finals.

Team 1	Agg.	Team 2	1st leg	2nd leg
Issy-Paris Hand (France)	36–49	(Denmark) **Team Tvis Holstebro**	24–20	12–29
**Handball Club Lada** (Russia)	55–46	(Slovenia) RK Krim	28–24	27–22

=== Finals ===
Teams listed first played the first leg at home.

Team 1	Agg.	Team 2	1st leg	2nd leg
**Team Tvis Holstebro** (Denmark)	61–52	(Russia) Handball Club Lada	31–27	30–25
