= Start Elbląg =

Polish handball club

EKS Start Elbląg
- Full name: Elblaski Klub Sportowy Start Elbląg
- Nickname(s): Starterki, Piwne
- Short name: Start Elbląg
- Founded: 1953; 73 years ago
- Arena: Hala Sportowo-Widowiskowa, Elbląg
- Capacity: 2,500
- President: Miłosz Kulawiak
- Head coach: Magdalena Stanulewicz
- League: PGNiG Superliga
- Club colours

EKS Start Elbląg is a Polish women's handball team, based in Elbląg, playing in PGNiG Superliga. Their current coach since 2024 is Magdalena Stanulewicz, who previously headed second-league team SPR AMW Gdynia.

== Titles ==
- Ekstraklasa
  - Winners (2) : 1992, 1994
- Polish Handball Cup
  - Winners (3) : 1993, 1994, 1999

== European record ==
Season	Competition	Round	Club	Home	Away	Aggregate
2016-17	Challenge Cup	R3	(Austria) UHC Müllner Bau Stockerau	33–20	28–17	61–37
2016-17	Challenge Cup	1/8	(Azerbaijan) ABU Baku	33–23	32–24	65–47
2016-17	Challenge Cup	1/4	(Czech Republic) DHC Sokol Poruba	29–24	14–27	43–51

== Team ==
=== Current squad ===
Squad for the 2017–18 season

Goalkeepers

- (Poland) Alicja Klarkowska
- (Poland) Klaudia Powaga
- (Poland) Solomija Szywerska

Wingers
RW

- (Poland) Magda Balsam
- (Poland) Aleksandra Jedrzejczyk

LW

- (Poland) Daria Gerej
- (Poland) Dominika Hawryszko

Line Players

- (Poland) Aleksandra Stokłosa
- (Poland) Aleksandra Dorsz

Back players

- (Poland) Sylwia Lisewska
- (Poland) Patrycja Swierczewska
- (Poland) Joanna Waga
- (Belarus) Hanna Yashchuk
- (Poland) Katarzyna Kozimur
- (Poland) Aleksandra Kwiecinska

== See also ==
- Handball in Poland
- Sports in Poland
