= RKHV Quintus =

Dutch handball club

HV Quintus
- Full name: Rooms Katholieke Handbalvereniging Quintus
- Founded: April 25, 1950; 75 years ago
- Arena: Eekhouthal
- Capacity: 1,000
- Head coach: Jack van Lier (men's); Rene Zwinkels (women's)
- League: Eredivisie
- 2024-25: 11th
Home	Away

RKHV Quintus is a handball club from Kwintsheul, Netherlands. Both men and woman's team compete in the highest league in the Netherlands; Eredivisie.

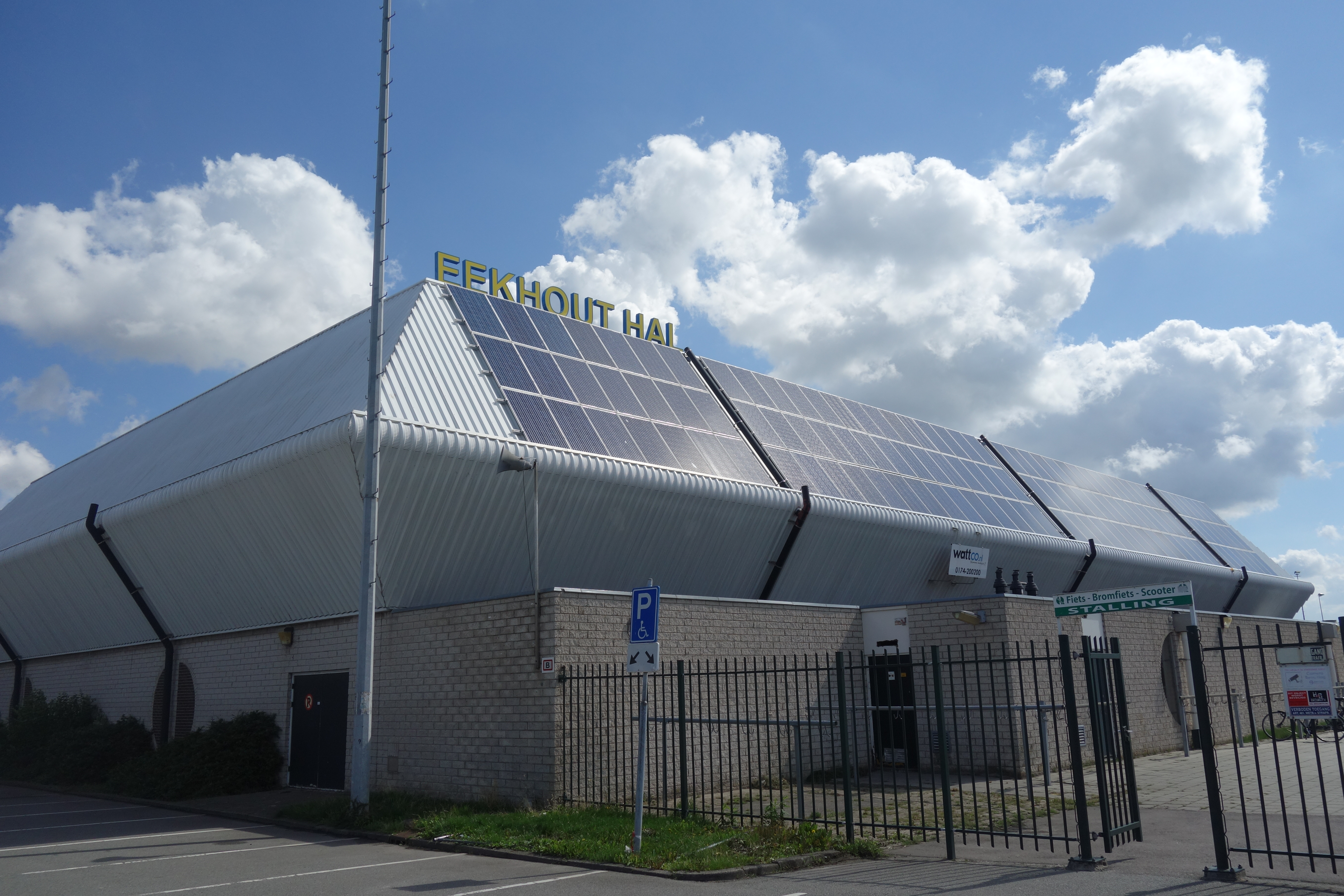
Venue: Eekhout Hall

== Women's handball team ==
=== Honours ===
- Lotto Eredivisie:
  - Winners (2): 2006, 2007
- Beker van Nederland :
  - Winners (4): 1979, 2006, 2007, 2008
- Dutch Supercup
  - Winners (2) : 2006, 2007

=== European record ===
Season	Competition	Round	Club	1st leg	2nd leg	Aggregate
2017–18	Challenge Cup	R3	(Kosovo) KHF Istogu	36–13	40–21	76–33
2017–18	Challenge Cup	1/8	(Serbia) HC Naisa Niš	35–25	39–31	74–56
2017–18	Challenge Cup	1/4	(Croatia) HC Lokomotiva Zagreb	17–26	24–27	41–53

=== Notable former players ===
- (Netherlands) Yvette Broch
- (Netherlands) Maura Visser
- (Netherlands) Kelly Dulfer
- (Netherlands) Marieke van der Wal
- (Netherlands) Jurswailly Luciano
- (Netherlands) Rinka Duijndam
- (Netherlands) Romée Maarschalkerweerd

== Men's handball team ==
=== Crest, colours, supporters ===
==== Kits ====
HOME

2015–16
