= EHF Women's European Cup =

European handball cup competition

- Current season, competition or edition: 2025–26 Women's EHF European Cup
- Sport: Handball
- Founded: 1993
- Country: EHF members
- Continent: Europe
- Most recent champions: (Spain) Mecalia Atlético Guardés (1st title)
- Most titles: (Spain) Rocasa Gran Canaria (3 titles)
- Related competitions: EHF Champions League; EHF European League
- Website: ehfec.eurohandball.com

The Women's EHF European Cup is an annual team handball competition for women's clubs of Europe. It was known as the EHF City Cup until the 1999–2000 season and the EHF Challenge Cup until the 2019–20 season. It is currently the third-tier competition of European club handball.

== Summary ==
| Year | Final | | | Semi Final Losers |
| Year | Champion | Score | Second Place |
|---|---|---|---|---|---|
| 1993–94; Details | (Germany); Buxtehuder SV | 22–21; 23–22 | (Norway); Baekkelagets Oslo | (Hungary); Szegedi | (Romania); Hidrotehnica Constanţa |
| 1994–95; Details | (Russia); Rotor Volgograd | 24–19; 24–20 | (Hungary); Vasas Budapest | (Denmark); Ikast F.S. | (Croatia); Granicar Djurdjevac |
| 1995–96; Details | (Romania); Silcotub Zalău | 23–15; 19–27 | (Norway); Gjerpen IF Skien | (Russia); Kuban Krasnodar | (France); ES Besançon |
| 1996–97; Details | (Germany); Frankfurter HC | 29–25; 26–24 | (Denmark); Ikast F.S. | (Norway); Junkeren Bodo | (Romania); Silcotub Zalău |
| 1997–98; Details | (Denmark); Ikast F.S. | 27–22; 29–22 | (Germany); Frankfurter HC | (Germany); Walle Bremen | (Russia); AKVA Volgograd |
| 1998–99; Details | (Serbia and Montenegro) "Napredak" Kruševac | 32–18; 26–19 | (Netherlands); Van Riet Nieuwegein | (France); Nîmes | (Romania); Oţelul Galaţi |
| 1999–00; Details | (Romania); Rapid CFR București | 30–25; 26–26 | (Denmark); Randers | (Norway); Byåsen | (Croatia); Osijek |
| 2000–01; Details | (France); Nîmes | 22–18; 18–16 | (Croatia); Split Kaltenberg | (Romania); FibrexNylon Săvinești | (Russia); Luch Moscow |
| 2001–02; Details | (Romania); Universitatea Remin Deva | 33–23; 31–25 | (Germany); Buxtehuder SV | (Portugal); Gil Eanes-Lagos | (Romania); Rapid CFR București |
| 2002–03; Details | (Germany); Borussia Dortmund | 24–16; 21–27 | (Romania); Selmont Baia Mare | (Germany); DJK/MJC Trier | (Poland); Nata AZS AWFiS Gdańsk |
| 2003–04; Details | (Germany); 1. FC Nürnberg | 29–23; 29–33 | (Romania); Universitatea Remin Deva | (Iceland); ÍBV | (Poland); Vitaral Jelfa Jelenia Góra |
| 2004–05; Details | (Germany); Bayer 04 Leverkusen | 27–28; 25–22 | (France); Cercle Dijon Bourgogne | (Croatia); Split Kaltenberg | (Germany); Buxtehuder SV |
| 2005–06; Details | (Romania); Rulmentul Braşov | 30–22; 25–24 | (Romania); Tomis Constanţa | (France); Mérignac | (Iceland); Valur |
| 2006–07; Details | (Serbia) "Naisa" Nis | 23–32; 30–21 | (Romania); Universitatea Jolidon Cluj-Napoca | (Croatia); Trešnjevka Zagreb | (Romania); HCM Roman |
| 2007–08; Details | (Germany); Oldenburg | 31–25; 29–26 | (France); Mérignac | (Romania); Dunărea Brăila | (Slovakia); ŠKP Bratislava |
| 2008–09; Details | (France); Nîmes | 26–22; 30–25 | (Germany); Thüringer | (Germany); ProVital Blomberg-Lippe | (Turkey); Izmir BSB SK |
| 2009–10; Details | (Germany); Buxtehuder SV | 40–28; 28–26 | (Germany); Frisch Auf Göppingen | (Poland); Vistal Gdynia | (North Macedonia); Metalurg Skopje |
| 2010–11; Details | (France); Mios Biganos | 31–26; 30–29 | (Turkey); Muratpaşa Bld. SK | (Netherlands); HandbalAcademie | (France); Nîmes |
| 2011–12; Details | (France); H.A.C. Handball | 36–27; 27–30 | (Turkey); Muratpaşa Bld. SK | (Croatia); Lokomotiva Zagreb | (France); Fleury Loiret |
| 2012–13; Details | (Czech Republic); Baník Most | 20–24; 26–17 | (Croatia); Samobor | (Turkey); Üsküdar Bld. SK | (Sweden); H 65 Höör |
| 2013–14; Details | (Sweden); H 65 Höör | 19–21; 23–21 | (France); Issy Paris | (Ukraine); Galychanka Lviv | (France); Mios Biganos |
| 2014–15; Details | (France); Mios Biganos | 21–20; 28–24 | (Poland); Pogoń Baltica Szczecin | (Ukraine); Galychanka Lviv | (France); Le Havre |
| 2015–16; Details | (Spain); Rocasa Gran Canaria | 29–25; 33–29 | (Turkey); Kastamonu Bld. GSK | (Poland); EKS Start Elbląg | (Ukraine); HC Karpaty |
| 2016–17; Details | (Croatia); Lokomotiva Zagreb | 23–19; 24–21 | (Sweden); H 65 Höör | (Netherlands); Virto/Quintus | (Czech Republic); DHC Sokol Poruba |
| 2017–18; Details | (Poland); MKS Lublin | 22–22; 27–23 | (Spain); Rocasa Gran Canaria | (Turkey); Ardeşen GSK | (Croatia); Lokomotiva Zagreb |
| 2018–19; Details | (Spain); Rocasa Gran Canaria | 30–23; 23–24 | (Poland); Pogoń Baltica Szczecin | (Netherlands); Quintus | (Sweden); Kristianstad Handboll |
| 2019–20; Details | Cancelled due to COVID-19 pandemic |
| 2020–21; Details | (Spain); CBF Málaga Costa del Sol | 32–28; 28–31 | (Croatia); Lokomotiva Zagreb | (Spain); Atlético Guardés | (Turkey); Yalikavaksports Club |
| 2021–22; Details | (Spain); Rocasa Gran Canaria | 21–17; 25–29 | (Spain); Costa del Sol Málaga | (Ukraine); Galychanka Lviv | (Serbia); Bekament Bukovička Banja |
| 2022–23; Details | (Turkey); Antalya Konyaaltı | 17–23; 33–20 | (Spain); Atlético Guardés | (Slovakia); IUVENTA Michalovce | (Spain); Atticgo Elche |
| 2023–24; Details | (Spain); Atticgo Elche | 22–20; 28–22 | (Slovakia); IUVENTA Michalovce | (Portugal); S.L. Benfica | (Spain); Rocasa Gran Canaria |
| 2024–25; Details | (Iceland); Valur | 29–29; 25–24 | (Spain); Porriño | (Czech Republic); Házená Kynžvart | (Slovakia); IUVENTA Michalovce |
| 2025–26; Details | (Spain); Mecalia Atlético Guardés | 24–20; 29–24 | (Slovakia); IUVENTA Michalovce | (Turkey); Bursa Büyüksehir BSK | (Spain); Costa del Sol Málaga |

== Titles by club ==
| Rank | Club | Titles | Runner up |
|---|---|---|---|
| 1 | (Spain) Rocasa Gran Canaria | 3 (2015–16, 2018–19, 2021–22) | 1 (2017–18) |
| 2 | (Germany) Buxtehuder SV | 2 (1993–94, 2009–10) | 1 (2001–02) |
| 3 | (France) Nîmes | 2 (2000–01, 2008–09) | 0 (-) |
| 3 | (France) Mios Biganos | 2 (2010–11, 2014–15) | 0 (-) |
| 5 | (Croatia) HC Lokomotiva Zagreb | 1 (2016–17) | 1 (2020–21) |
| 5 | (Romania) Universitatea Remin Deva | 1 (2001–02) | 1 (2003–04) |
| 5 | (Germany) Frankfurter HC | 1 (1996–97) | 1 (1997–98) |
| 5 | (Spain) Málaga Costa del Sol | 1 (2020–21) | 1 (2021–22) |
| 5 | (Spain) Mecalia Atlético Guardés | 1 (2025–26) | 1 (2022–23) |
| 10 | (Romania) Rulmentul Braşov | 1 (2005–06) | 0 (-) |
| 10 | (Romania) Rapid CFR București | 1 (1999–00) | 0 (-) |
| 10 | (Germany) Borussia Dortmund | 1 (2002–03) | 0 (-) |
| 10 | (Denmark) Ikast-Bording Elite Håndbold | 1 (1997–98) | 0 (-) |
| 10 | (Serbia and Montenegro) ŽORK Napredak Kruševac | 1 (1998–99) | 0 (-) |
| 10 | (Germany) Bayer 04 Leverkusen | 1 (2004–05) | 0 (-) |
| 10 | (Serbia) Naisa Niš | 1 (2006–07) | 0 (-) |
| 10 | (Germany) 1. FC Nürnberg | 1 (2003–04) | 0 (-) |
| 10 | (Germany) VfL Oldenburg | 1 (2007–08) | 0 (-) |
| 10 | (Russia) Rotor Volgograd | 1 (1994–95) | 0 (-) |
| 10 | (Romania) AS Silcotub Zalău | 1 (1995–96) | 0 (-) |
| 10 | (France) H.A.C. Handball | 1 (2011–12) | 0 (-) |
| 10 | (Czech Republic) Baník Most | 1 (2012–13) | 0 (-) |
| 10 | (Sweden) H 65 Höör | 1 (2013–14) | 0 (-) |
| 10 | (Poland) MKS Lublin | 1 (2017–18) | 0 (-) |
| 10 | (Turkey) Antalya Konyaaltı | 1 (2022–23) | 0 (-) |
| 10 | (Spain) Atticgo Elche | 1 (2023–24) | 0 (-) |
| 10 | (Iceland) Valur | 1 (2024–25) | 0 (-) |

== Titles by nations ==
| Rank | Country | Champion | Runner-up | Total finals |
|---|---|---|---|---|
| 1 | Germany | 7 | 4 | 11 |
| 2 | Spain | 6 | 4 | 10 |
| 3 | France | 5 | 3 | 8 |
| 4 | Romania | 4 | 4 | 8 |
| 5 | Serbia/ Serbia and Montenegro | 2 | 0 | 2 |
| 6 | Croatia | 1 | 3 | 4 |
| 6 | Turkey | 1 | 3 | 4 |
| 8 | Denmark | 1 | 2 | 3 |
| 8 | Poland | 1 | 2 | 3 |
| 10 | Sweden | 1 | 1 | 2 |
| 11 | Czech Republic | 1 | 0 | 1 |
| 11 | Iceland | 1 | 0 | 1 |
| 11 | Russia | 1 | 0 | 1 |
| 14 | Norway | 0 | 2 | 2 |
| 14 | Slovakia | 0 | 2 | 2 |
| 16 | Hungary | 0 | 1 | 1 |
| 16 | Netherlands | 0 | 1 | 1 |

== See also ==
- EHF European Cup
- Women's EHF European League
- Women's EHF Champions League
