= Agni Zygoura =

Greek handball player (born 1996)

Personal information
- Born: 4 February 1996 (age 30) Kastoria, Greece
- Height: 1.75 m (5 ft 9 in)

Sport
- Sport: Handball
- Position: Center back
- Current club: Bursa BB SK
- Number: 81

Youth career
- Years: Team
- –2014: Kastoria

Senior clubs
- Years: Team
- 2014–2018: OF Nea Ionia
- 2018–2020: PAOK
- 2020–2022: BM Remudas
- 2022: SSV Dornbirn Schoren
- 2023: PAOK
- 2023–2024: Neckarsulmer SU
- 2025–: Bursa BB SK
National team
- Years: Team
- 2018–2024: Greece

Agni Zygoura (Greek: Αγνή Ζυγούρα; born 4 February 1996) is a Greek handballer, who plays for Bursa BB SK in the Turkish Women's Super League and the Greece women's national team.

She played in two clubs in her country, winning many championships and cups. She was with Spanish, Austrian and German clubs before she moved to Turkey.

== Early life ==
Agni Zygoura was born in Kastoria, Western Macedonia, Greece on 4 February 1996.

== Club career ==
Zygoura is 1.75 m (5 ft 9 in) tall, and plays in the center back position.

=== Greece ===
She started her handball career in her hometown in Kastoria, where she played until her age of 18.

In 2014, she moved to Athens, and signed with OF Nea Ionia. She won four championships and three cups during her time until 2018. With OF Nea Ionia, she took part at the Women's IHF Cup in 2014–15, 2015–16, 2016–17, and 2017–18.

For the 2018–19 season, she transferred to the Thessaloniki-based club PAOK. She won the A1 Thniki and the Greek Cup. She was also named the MVP of the championship. In 2020, she extended her contract with PAOK. She competed for PAOK at the Women's EHF Cup in 2019–20, and 2020–21.

=== Spain ===
In December 2020, the Gran Canaria-based Spanish club BM Remudas announced that Zygoura signed a deal for the second half of the 2020–21 season, with an optional one-year extension. With her transfer, the club intended to replace their injured player, and strengthen the team in the upcoming final-16 matches of the EHF Women's European Cup. She played her first match on 20 December. In 2021, she played at the 2020–21 EHF Women's Champions Trophy, and 2021–22 Women's EHF European League.

=== Austria ===
In the 2022–23 season, she played for SSV Dornbirn Schoren in the Women Handball Liga Austria. Despite her multiple injuries and her team's five lost matches, she was named three times MVP. In a league match, she set a personal record in her career abroad with 13 goals.

=== Greece again and Germany ===
In the second half of the 2022–23 season, she returned to her former club PAOK. Mid June 2023, she transferred to Neckarsulmer SU in Germany on a two-years contract in 2023. She is to strengthen the team as the newly transferred Czech player was injured. She left the club after the season end.

=== Turkey ===
In the beginning of January 2025, she moved to Turkey, and joined Bursa Büyükşehir Bld. SK to play in the second half of the 2024-25 Turkish Super League season.

== International career ==
Zygoura is a member of Greece national team.

She took part at the 2018 Mediterranean Games Group A, IHF World Women's Handball Championship – European qualification in 2021, and 2023 as well as 2024 European Women's Handball Championship qualification matches.

== Honours ==
Turkish Women's Handball Cup

Bursa BBSK
Winners (1): 2025
