= 2014–15 Women's EHF Challenge Cup =

Women's EHF Challenge Cup
- 2014–15

Tournament information
- Sport: Handball
- Dates: 14 November 2014– May 2015
- Administrator: European Handball Federation
- Teams: 30 (Qualification stage)

Final positions
- Champions: Mios Biganos
- Runner-up: Pogoń Baltica Szczecin

The 2014–15 Women's EHF Challenge Cup was the 18th edition of the European Handball Federation's fourth-tier competition for men's handball clubs, running from 14 November 2014 to 13 May 2015. Mios Biganos won the tournament.

== Overview ==
=== Team allocation ===
The labels in the parentheses show how each team qualified for the place of its starting round:

- TH: Title holders
- 2nd, 3rd, 4th, 5th, 6th, etc.: League position

Last 16
(France) Le Havre (3rd)
Round 3
(France) Mios Biganos (4th)	(Poland) Pogoń Baltica Szczecin (4th)	(Portugal) Juve Lis (6th)	(Kosovo) KHF Kosova (2nd)
(Turkey) Ardeşen GSK (3rd)	(Poland) Energa AZS Koszalin (5th)	(Greece) Amyntas Amyntaiou (4th)	(Bosnia and Herzegovina) Goražde (3rd)
(Turkey) İzmir BSB (4th)	(Netherlands) DOS Emmen (3rd)	(Greece) M. Alexandros Giannitson (5th)	(Azerbaijan) ABU Baku (1st)
(Serbia) Naisa Niš (4th)	(Netherlands) Virto/Quintus (4th)	(Greece) Ormi Patras (6th)	(Israel) HC Holon (2nd)
(Serbia) ŽRK Knjaz Miloš (5th)	(Czech Republic) Sokol Poruba (3rd)	(Belarus) Gorodnichanka (3rd)	(United Kingdom) Thames HC (2nd)
(Serbia) Crvena zvezda (6th)	(Ukraine) HC Galychanka (2nd)	(Switzerland) DHB Rotweiss Thun ( )	(Finland) HIFK (1st)
(Croatia) Trešnjevka (3rd)	(Portugal) Colégio de Gaia (4th)	(Switzerland) Yellow Winterthur ( )	
(Croatia) Zelina (4th)	(Portugal) JAC Alcanena (5th)	(Iceland) Fram (1st)	

=== Round and draw dates ===
All draws held at the European Handball Federation headquarters in Vienna, Austria.

Round	Draw date	First leg	Second leg
Round 3	22 July 2014	15–16 November 2014	22–23 November 2014
Last 16	25 November 2014	7–8 February 2015	14–15 February 2015
Quarter-final	17 February 2015	7–8 March 2015	14–15 March 2015
Semi-finals	17 February 2015	4–5 April 2015	11–12 April 2015
Final	17 February 2015	2–3 May 2015	9–10 May 2015

== Qualification stage ==
=== Round 3 ===
Teams listed first played the first leg at home. Some teams agreed to play both matches in the same venue. Bolded teams qualified into last 16.

Team 1	Agg.	Team 2	1st leg	2nd leg
**Naisa Niš** (Serbia)	74–40^{a}	(United Kingdom) Thames HC	37–20	37–20
**Ardeşen GSK** (Turkey)	65–58^{b}	(Poland) Energa AZS Koszalin	34–27	31–31
Ormi Patras (Greece)	33–45^{c}	(Portugal) **Colégio de Gaia**	18–24	15–21
**Fram** (Iceland)	79–32^{d}	(Greece) M. Alexandros Giannitson	43–16	36–16
Crvena zvezda (Serbia)	52–54^{e}	(Azerbaijan) **ABU Baku**	29–31	23–23
DOS Emmen (Netherlands)	59–61	(France) **Mios Biganos**	28–29	31–32
Virto/Quintus (Netherlands)	41–51	(Ukraine) **HC Galychanka**	18–24	23–27
**JAC-Alcanena** (Portugal)	78–40^{f}	(Bosnia and Herzegovina) Goražde	40–15	38–25
**Gorodnichanka** (Belarus)	66–43	(Turkey) İzmir BSB	36–23	30–20
**Pogoń Baltica Szczecin** (Poland)	74–38	(Finland) HIFK	40–21	34–17
**Amyntas Amyntaiou** (Greece)	53–42^{g}	(Israel) HC Holon	28–21	25–21
**Sokol Poruba** (Czech Republic)	72–37^{h}	(Portugal) Juve Lis	35–19	37–18
DHB Rotweiss Thun (Switzerland)	34–40	(Switzerland) **Yellow Winterthur**	16–17	18–23
KHF Kosova (Kosovo)	37–91	(Croatia) **Zelina**	20–45	17–46
Trešnjevka (Croatia)	47–54^{i}	(Serbia) **Knjaz Miloš**	22–27	25–27

Notes

^{a} Both legs were hosted by Naisa Niš.
^{b} Both legs were hosted by Ardeşen GSK.
^{c} Both legs were hosted by Colégio de Gaia.
^{d} Both legs were hosted by Fram.
^{e} Both legs were hosted by Crvena zvezda.

^{f} Both legs were hosted by JAC-Alcanena.
^{g} Both legs were hosted by Amyntas Amyntaiou.
^{h} Both legs were hosted by Sokol Poruba.
^{i} Both legs were hosted by Knjaz Miloš.

== Knockout stage ==
Last 16
(Turkey) **Ardeşen GSK**	32	28	**60**
(Croatia) Zelina	29	30	**59**
(Portugal) JAC-Alcanena	22	21	**43**
(Poland) **Pogoń Baltica Szczecin**	33	26	**59**
(Serbia) **Naisa Niš**	28	22	**50**
(Iceland) Fram	32	17	**49**
(Greece) Amyntas Amyntaiou	11	16	**27**
(Ukraine) **HC Galychanka**	26	36	**62**
(Portugal) Colégio de Gaia	24	29	**53**
(Czech Republic) **Sokol Poruba**	28	27	**55**
(Switzerland) Yellow Winterthur	18	16	**34**
(France) **Mios Biganos**	34	28	**62**
(Azerbaijan) ABU SC Baku	28	28	**56**
(Serbia) **Knjaz Miloš**	37	27	**64**
(France) **Le Havre**	27	32	**59**
(Belarus) Gorodnichanka	18	13	**31**

Quarter-final
(Turkey) Ardeşen GSK	31	26	**57**
(Poland) **Pogoń Baltica Szczecin**	28	31	**59**
(Serbia) Naisa Niš	22	20	**42**
(Ukraine) **HC Galychanka**	28	27	**55**
(Czech Republic) Sokol Poruba	24	22	**46**
(France) **Mios Biganos**	31	24	**55**
(Serbia) Knjaz Miloš	25	24	**49**
(France) **Le Havre**	33	26	**59**

Semi-finals
(Poland) **Pogoń Baltica Szczecin**	29	25	**54**
(Ukraine) HC Galychanka	28	21	**49**
(France) **Mios Biganos**	21	38	**59**
(France) Le Havre	28	26	**54**

Final
(Poland) Pogoń Baltica Szczecin	20	24	**44**
(France) **Mios Biganos**	21	28	**49**

=== Last 16 ===
==== Seedings ====
Pot 1	Pot 2
(Czech Republic) Sokol Poruba (France) Le Havre (France) Mios Biganos (Poland) Pogoń Baltica Szczecin (Serbia) Naisa Niš (Serbia) Knjaz Miloš (Turkey) Ardeşen GSK (Ukraine) HC Galychanka	(Azerbaijan) ABU SC Baku (Belarus) Gorodnichanka (Croatia) Zelina (Greece) Amyntas Amyntaiou (Iceland) Fram (Portugal) Colégio de Gaia (Portugal) JAC-Alcanena (Switzerland) Yellow Winterthur

==== Matches ====
Teams listed first played the first leg at home. Some teams agreed to play both matches in the same venue. Bolded teams qualified into quarter finals.

Team 1	Agg.	Team 2	1st leg	2nd leg
JAC-Alcanena (Portugal)	43–59^{a}	(Poland) **Pogoń Baltica Szczecin**	22–33	21–26
ABU SC Baku (Azerbaijan)	56–64^{b}	(Serbia) **Knjaz Miloš**	28–37	28–27
**Naisa Niš** (Serbia)	50–49^{c}	(Iceland) Fram	28–32	22–17
**Ardeşen GSK** (Turkey)	60–59^{d}	(Croatia) Zelina	32–29	28–30
Amyntas Amyntaiou (Greece)	27–62	(Ukraine) **HC Galychanka**	11–26	16–36
Yellow Winterthur (Switzerland)	34–62^{e}	(France) **Mios Biganos**	18–34	16–28
**Le Havre** (France)	59–31^{f}	(Belarus) Gorodnichanka	27–18	32–13
Colégio de Gaia (Portugal)	53–55^{g}	(Czech Republic) **Sokol Poruba**	24–28	29–27

Notes

^{a} Both legs were hosted by JAC-Alcanena.
^{b} Both legs were hosted by Knjaz Miloš.
^{c} Both legs were hosted by Naisa Niš.
^{d} Both legs were hosted by Ardeşen GSK.

^{e} Both legs were hosted by Mios Biganos.
^{f} Both legs were hosted by Le Havre.
^{g} Both legs were hosted by Colégio de Gaia.

=== Quarter-finals ===
Teams listed first played the first leg at home. Some teams agreed to play both matches in the same venue. Bolded teams qualified into semi finals.

Team 1	Agg.	Team 2	1st leg	2nd leg
Ardeşen GSK (Turkey)	57–59^{a}	(Poland) **Pogoń Baltica Szczecin**	31–28	26–31
Sokol Poruba (Czech Republic)	46–55	(France) **Mios Biganos**	24–31	22–24
Knjaz Miloš (Serbia)	49–59	(France) **Le Havre**	25–33	24–26
Naisa Niš (Serbia)	42–55^{b}	(Ukraine) **HC Galychanka**	22–28	20–27

Notes

^{a} Both legs were hosted by Ardeşen GSK.

^{b} Both legs were hosted by Galytchanka.

=== Semi-finals ===
Teams listed first played the first leg at home. Some teams agreed to play both matches in the same venue. Bolded teams qualified into the Finals.

Team 1	Agg.	Team 2	1st leg	2nd leg
**Pogoń Baltica Szczecin** (Poland)	54–49	(Ukraine) HC Galychanka	29–28	25–21
**Mios Biganos** (France)	59–54	(France) Le Havre	21–28	38–26

=== Final ===
Team listed first played the first leg at home.

Team 1	Agg.	Team 2	1st leg	2nd leg
Pogoń Baltica Szczecin (Poland)	44–49	(France) **Mios Biganos**	20–21	24–28

== See also ==
- 2014–15 Women's EHF Champions League
- 2014–15 Women's EHF Cup Winners' Cup
- 2014–15 Women's EHF Cup
