= 2012–13 Women's EHF Cup =

European handball tournament

Women's EHF Cup
- 2012–13

Tournament information
- Sport: Handball
- Dates: 13 October 2012–12 May 2013

Final positions
- Champions: (Denmark) Team Tvis Holstebro
- Runner-up: (France) Metz Handball

Tournament statistics
- Top scorer(s): (Denmark) Ann Grete Nørgaard (92 goals)

The 2012–13 Women's EHF Cup was the 32nd edition of the competition, running from 13 October 2012 to May 2013.

Team Tvis Holstebro defeated Metz Handball in the final overcoming a home 4-goals loss to win its first international trophy and the third win for Denmark in four years. Metz, which defeated the previous season's runner-up HC Zalău in the semifinals, was the first French team to reach the competition's final since 1993.

== First qualifying round ==
Team #1	Agg.	Team #2	1st match	2nd match
Megas Alexandros (Greece)	49–49	(Kosovo) Prishtina	27–27	22–22
Gorodnichanka (Belarus)	48–77	(Hungary) Érd NK	25–46	23–31
Dunărea Brăila (Romania)	72–29	(Montenegro) Biseri Pljevlja	39–14	33–15
Teramo (Italy)	0–20	(Spain) Alcobendas	0–10	0–10
Tvis Holstebro (Denmark)	96–47	(Bosnia and Herzegovina) Borac Banja Luka	54–22	42–25
Maccabi Ramat Gan (Israel)	44–82	(Belgium) Fémina Visé	21–41	23–41
Valencia Aicequip (Spain)	47–64	(Iceland) Valur	22–27	25–37
Zaglebie Lubin (Poland)	43–37	(Croatia) Zelina	22–18	21–19
Tertnes (Norway)	53–42	(Iceland) Fram	35–21	18–21
Sassari (Italy)	63–49	(Israel) Bnei Herzliya	30–24	33–25
HC Karpaty Uzhhorod (Ukraine)	74–45	(Bulgaria) Etar Veliko Tarnovo	34–17	40–28
Sokol Poruba (Czech Republic)	52–59	(Russia) Astrakhanochka	23–23	29–36

== Second qualifying round ==
Team #1	Agg.	Team #2	1st match	2nd match
Juve Lis (Portugal)	49–48	(Switzerland) Spono Nottwil	24–26	25–22
Érd NK (Hungary)	63–63	(France) Metz	37–31	26–32
Sassari (Italy)	0–20	(Russia) Lada Togliatti	0–10	0–10
Zaglebie Lubin (Poland)	55–53	(Belarus) BNTU Minsk	30–29	25–24
Alcobendas (Spain)	32–74	(Denmark) Midtjylland	14–37	18–37
Valur (Iceland)	45–45	(Romania) Zalău	24–23	21–22
Astrakhanochka (Russia)	63–59	(Hungary) Siófok KC	41–28	22–31
Itxako (Spain)	73–41	(Cyprus) Latsia	33–23	40–18
HC Karpaty Uzhhorod (Ukraine)	54–55	(Serbia) Radnički Kragujevac	31–22	23–33
Lugi (Sweden)	50–72	(Denmark) Tvis Holstebro	24–39	26–33
Zagorje (Slovenia)	69–40	(Kosovo) Prishtina	43–22	26–18
Patras (Greece)	35–55	(North Macedonia) Vardar Skopje	19–28	16–27
Kuban Krasnodar (Russia)	52–51	(Romania) Dunărea Brăila	28–22	24–29
Westfriesland (Netherlands)	37–69	(France) Le Havre	22–38	15–31
Cankaya (Turkey)	73–46	(Belgium) Fémina Visé	31–21	42–25
Tertnes (Norway)	64–58	(Germany) Frankfurter	34–22	30–36

== Round of 16 ==
Team #1	Agg.	Team #2	1st match	2nd match
Astrakhanochka (Russia)	78–50	(Serbia) Radnički Kragujevac	41–25	37–25
Cankaya (Turkey)	60–60	(Spain) Itxako	37–24	23–36
Tertnes (Norway)	64–51	(France) Le Havre	33–23	31–28
Zalău (Romania)	54–22	(Portugal) Juve Lis	25–14	29–8
Vardar Skopje (North Macedonia)	47–50	(Russia) Kuban Krasnodar	30–28	17–22
Tvis Holstebro (Denmark)	54–49	(Russia) Lada Togliatti	24–19	30–30
Midtjylland (Denmark)	59–50	(Slovenia) Zagorje	31–28	28–22
Metz (France)	53–50	(Poland) Zaglebie Lubin	29–28	24–22

== Quarter-finals ==
Team #1	Agg.	Team #2	1st match	2nd match
Itxako (Spain)	42–70	(Romania) Zalău	22–31	20–39
Tvis Holstebro (Denmark)	66–62	(Norway) Tertnes	36–29	30–33
Midtjylland (Denmark)	65–43	(Russia) Kuban Krasnodar	39–21	26–22
Astrakhanochka (Russia)	45–52	(France) Metz	26–19	19–33

== Semifinals ==
Team #1	Agg.	Team #2	1st match	2nd match
Metz (France)	60–36	(Romania) Zalău	34–15	26–21
Midtjylland (Denmark)	46–47	(Denmark) Tvis Holstebro	22–29	24–18

== Final ==
Team #1	Agg.	Team #2	1st match	2nd match
Tvis Holstebro (Denmark)	64–63	(France) Metz	31–35	33–28
