= 2017–18 Greek Handball League (women) =

A1 Ethniki
- Season: 2017–18

The 2017–18 Greek A1 Ethniki was the 36th season of the A1 Ethniki, Greece's premier handball women's league.

== Teams ==
Location of teams in Greek A1 Ethniki 2017-18

A total of 10 teams participated in this year's edition of the Women's A1 Ethniki. Of these, 8 sides qualified directly from the 2016–17 season, while 2 sides qualified from the A2 Ethniki play-offs: GAS Kamatero and Aris Thessaloniki.

Team	Location
Amyntas Amyntaio	Amyntaio
Feta Ipiros Anagennisi Arta	Arta
Aris Thessaloniki	Thessaloniki
Filippos Veria	Veria
Filotas Florina	Florina
GAS Kamatero	Kamatero, Athens
Megas Alexandros Giannitsa	Giannitsa
OF Nea Ionia	Nea Ionia, Athens
Honda Panorama	Panorama, Thessaloniki
PAOK	Thessaloniki

== Regular season ==
=== League table ===
Pos	Team	Pld	W	D	L	GF	GA	GD	Pts	Qualification or relegation
1	Amyntas Amyntaio	0	0	0	0	0	0	0	0	Qualification to 2017-18 Finals
2	Anagennisi Arta	0	0	0	0	0	0	0	0	Qualification to 2017-18 Finals
3	Aris Thessaloniki	0	0	0	0	0	0	0	0	
4	Filotas Florina	0	0	0	0	0	0	0	0	
5	Megas Alexandros	0	0	0	0	0	0	0	0	
6	GAS Kamatero	0	0	0	0	0	0	0	0	
7	OF Nea Ionia	0	0	0	0	0	0	0	0	
8	Filippos Veria	0	0	0	0	0	0	0	0	
9	Honda Panorama	0	0	0	0	0	0	0	0	Relegation to 2018–19 A2 Ethniki
10	PAOK	0	0	0	0	0	0	0	0	Relegation to 2018–19 A2 Ethniki

First match(es) will be played: unknown. Source: Hellenic Handball Federation
Rules for classification: 1) Points; 2) Head-to-head points; 3) Head-to-head goal difference; 4) Head-to-head away goals (if 2 teams are tied); 5) Head-to-head goals scored (if more than 2 teams are tied); 6) Goal difference; 7) Goals scored; 8) Draw or single play-off game (only used if needed to decide champion, teams for relegation or qualification for European competitions).

=== Results ===
Home \ Away	AMY	ANA	ARI	VER	FLO	KAM	MEG	OFN	PAN	PAO
Amyntas Amyntaio	—									
Anagennisi Arta		—								
Aris Thessaloniki			—							
Filippos Veria				—						
Filotas Florina					—					
GAS Kamatero						—				
Megas Alexandros							—			
OF Nea Ionia								—		
Honda Panorama									—	
PAOK										—

First match(es) will be played: unknown. Source: Hellenic Handball Federation
Legend: Blue = home team win; Yellow = draw; Red = away team win.
For upcoming matches, an "a" indicates there is an article about the rivalry between the two participants.

== Finals ==
In the finals, teams playing against each other must win three games to win the series. Thus, if one team wins three games before all five games have been played, the remaining games are omitted. The team that finished in the higher championship play-off place, is going to play the first, second and fifth (if necessary) game of the series at home.

Team 1	Agg.	Team 2	Game 1	Game 2	Game 3	Game 4	Game 5
			–	–	–	–	–

Source: Hellenic Handball Federation
