= Greek Women's Handball Super Cup =

- Sport: Handball
- Founded: 2023; 3 years ago
- Founder: Hellenic Handball Federation
- No. of teams: 2
- Country: Greece
- Domestic cups: Handball Premier; Greek Cup
- Website: www.handball.org.gr

The Greek Women's Handball Super Cup is the third most important competition in Greek women's handball. The Super Cup is organised by the Hellenic Handball Federation (Greek: ΟΧΕ). The first Super Cup final took place in 2023. It was held in Kozani and winner was PAOK. The second final was held in Lamia and the winner team was OF Nea Ionia

== Previous winners ==
- 2023 : PAOK
- 2024 : OF Nea Ionia
- 2025 : OF Nea Ionia
- 2026 : PAOK

== Finals ==
Year	Winner	Score	Runner up	Location	Ref.
2023	PAOK	19–17	OF Nea Ionia	Kozani	
2024	OF Nea Ionia	26–18	PAOK	Lamia	
2025	OF Nea Ionia	19–17	PAOK	Veroia	
2026	PAOK	30–18	Anagennisi Arta	Thessaloniki	

== Performances ==
=== By club ===
Club	Cups	Cup's year	Finalist
PAOK	2	2023 2026	2
OF Nea Ionia	2	2024 2025	1
