= Katarina Tomašević =

Serbian handball player (born 1984)

Personal information
- Nationality: Serbian
- Born: 6 February 1984 (age 42) Belgrade, SR Serbia, SFR Yugoslavia
- Height: 1.77 m (5 ft 10 in)

Sport
- Sport: Handball
- Position: Goalkeeper
- Current club: ZRK Bekament
- Number: 27

Senior clubs
- Years: Team
- 2006–2007: Hypo Niederösterreich
- 2007–2009: Team Esbjerg
- 2009–2010: BM Bera Bera
- 2010–2012: ŽRK Zaječar
- 2012–2013: Thüringer HC
- 2013–2014: Nantes Handball
- 2014–2017: Ferencvárosi TC
- 2017–2019: Dunaújvárosi KKA
- 2019–2022: Szombathelyi KKA
- 2023–2024: PAOK
- 2024–: ZRK Bekament
National team
Years	Team	Apps	(Gls)
–	Serbia	118	(2)
Medal record
World Championship
Silver medal – second place	2013 Serbia

Katarina Tomašević (Serbian Cyrillic: Катарина Томашевић; née Stevancevic; born 6 February 1984) is a Serbian handballer for the Serbian national team.

== Honours ==
- Austrian Championship:
  - Winner: 2007
- Austrian Cup
  - Winner: 2007
- Serbian Championship:
  - Winner: 2011, 2012
- German Championship:
  - Winner: 2013
- Hungarian Championship:
  - Winner: 2015
- Greek Championship:
  - Winner: 2023
- Greek Super Cup:
  - Winner: 2023
- Greek Cup:
  - Winner:2024

== Personal life ==
Tomašević is married. She gave birth to her son Petar in July 2011, and her daughter Jovana was born in January 2017.
