= Handball at the 2018 Mediterranean Games – Women's tournament =

Women's handball at the 2018 Mediterranean Games
Tournament details
- Host country: Spain
- Venue(s): 2 (in 2 host cities)
- Dates: 23–30 June
- Teams: 10 (from 2 confederations)

Final positions
- Champions: Spain (2nd title)
- Runners-up: Montenegro
- Third place: Slovenia
- Fourth place: North Macedonia

Tournament statistics
- Matches played: 26
- Goals scored: 1,389 (53.42 per match)

The women's handball tournament at the 2018 Mediterranean Games was held from 23 to 30 June at the Pabellón CE Vendrell in El Vendrell and at the Campclar Sports Palace in Tarragona.

== Participating teams ==
- Egypt
- Greece
- Italy
- North Macedonia
- Montenegro
- Portugal
- Slovenia
- Serbia
- Spain (host)
- Turkey

== Group stage ==
All times are local (UTC+2).

=== Group A ===
Pos	Team	Pld	W	D	L	GF	GA	GD	Pts	Qualification
1	Spain (H)	4	4	0	0	116	65	+51	8	Semifinals
2	Slovenia	4	3	0	1	108	100	+8	6	Semifinals
3	Italy	4	1	0	3	103	118	−15	2 (Note: Italy 2 Pts, +2 GD; Portugal 2 Pts, 0 GD; Greece 2 Pts, –2 GD)	5th place game
4	Portugal	4	1	0	3	95	117	−22	2	7th place game
5	Greece	4	1	0	3	90	112	−22	2	

Source: Tarragona 2018
Rules for classification: 1) Points; 2) Head-to-head points; 3) Head-to-head goal difference; 4) Head-to-head goals scored; 5) Goal difference; 6) Goals scored; 7) Draw.
(H) Hosts
Notes:

23 June 2018; 18:00	Spain	29–17	Slovenia	Pabellón CE Vendrell, El Vendrell; Referees: Pinto, Santos (POR)
23 June 2018; 18:00	Prieto 6	(12–9)	Mavsar 5	Pabellón CE Vendrell, El Vendrell; Referees: Pinto, Santos (POR)
23 June 2018; 18:00	1× (yellow card) 3× (suspension)	Report	1× (yellow card) 3× (suspension)	Pabellón CE Vendrell, El Vendrell; Referees: Pinto, Santos (POR)

23 June 2018; 20:00	Greece	26–31	Italy	Pabellón CE Vendrell, El Vendrell; Referees: Jovandić, Sekulić (SRB)
23 June 2018; 20:00	Tsàkalou 9	(12–15)	Gheorghe, Pruenster 7	Pabellón CE Vendrell, El Vendrell; Referees: Jovandić, Sekulić (SRB)
23 June 2018; 20:00	1× (yellow card) 1× (suspension)	Report	2× (yellow card) 4× (suspension)	Pabellón CE Vendrell, El Vendrell; Referees: Jovandić, Sekulić (SRB)

24 June 2018; 18:00	Slovenia	29–24	Portugal	Pabellón CE Vendrell, El Vendrell; Referees: El-Moamly, Abdelaziz (EGY)
24 June 2018; 18:00	Mavsar 8	(18–11)	Correia 6	Pabellón CE Vendrell, El Vendrell; Referees: El-Moamly, Abdelaziz (EGY)
24 June 2018; 18:00	2× (yellow card) 1× (suspension)	Report	3× (yellow card) 2× (suspension)	Pabellón CE Vendrell, El Vendrell; Referees: El-Moamly, Abdelaziz (EGY)

24 June 2018; 20:00	Spain	27–12	Greece	Pabellón CE Vendrell, El Vendrell; Referees: Deche, Ghouarda (ALG)
24 June 2018; 20:00	A. González 5	(12–5)	Tsàkalou 8	Pabellón CE Vendrell, El Vendrell; Referees: Deche, Ghouarda (ALG)
24 June 2018; 20:00	3× (yellow card) 4× (suspension)	Report	2× (yellow card) 3× (suspension) 1× (red card)	Pabellón CE Vendrell, El Vendrell; Referees: Deche, Ghouarda (ALG)

25 June 2018; 18:00	Slovenia	33–23	Italy	Pabellón CE Vendrell, El Vendrell; Referees: Deche, Ghouarda (ALG)
25 June 2018; 18:00	Mavsar 10	(15–10)	Niederwieser 5	Pabellón CE Vendrell, El Vendrell; Referees: Deche, Ghouarda (ALG)
25 June 2018; 18:00	3× (yellow card) 7× (suspension)	Report	3× (yellow card) 6× (suspension)	Pabellón CE Vendrell, El Vendrell; Referees: Deche, Ghouarda (ALG)

25 June 2018; 20:00	Spain	32–15	Portugal	Pabellón CE Vendrell, El Vendrell; Referees: Ivanović, Vujisić (MNE)
25 June 2018; 20:00	Valdivia 6	(18–6)	Pereira 4	Pabellón CE Vendrell, El Vendrell; Referees: Ivanović, Vujisić (MNE)
25 June 2018; 20:00	1× (yellow card) 4× (suspension)	Report	2× (yellow card) 3× (suspension) 1× (red card)	Pabellón CE Vendrell, El Vendrell; Referees: Ivanović, Vujisić (MNE)

27 June 2018; 18:00	Greece	28–25	Portugal	Pabellón CE Vendrell, El Vendrell; Referees: Alperan, Scevola (ITA)
27 June 2018; 18:00	Tsàkalou 8	(13–12)	S. Lopes 7	Pabellón CE Vendrell, El Vendrell; Referees: Alperan, Scevola (ITA)
27 June 2018; 18:00	3× (yellow card) 4× (suspension)	Report	3× (yellow card) 3× (suspension)	Pabellón CE Vendrell, El Vendrell; Referees: Alperan, Scevola (ITA)

27 June 2018; 20:00	Spain	28–21	Italy	Pabellón CE Vendrell, El Vendrell; Referees: Jurinović, Mrvica (CRO)
27 June 2018; 20:00	Gutiérrez, Etxeberria 7	(15–11)	Gheorghe 8	Pabellón CE Vendrell, El Vendrell; Referees: Jurinović, Mrvica (CRO)
27 June 2018; 20:00	3× (yellow card) 2× (suspension)	Report	2× (yellow card) 3× (suspension)	Pabellón CE Vendrell, El Vendrell; Referees: Jurinović, Mrvica (CRO)

28 June 2018; 18:00	Slovenia	29–24	Greece	Pabellón CE Vendrell, El Vendrell; Referees: García, Rodríguez (ESP)
28 June 2018; 18:00	Mavsar 6	(18–11)	Tsàkalou 11	Pabellón CE Vendrell, El Vendrell; Referees: García, Rodríguez (ESP)
28 June 2018; 18:00	2× (yellow card) 5× (suspension)	Report		Pabellón CE Vendrell, El Vendrell; Referees: García, Rodríguez (ESP)

28 June 2018; 20:00	Italy	28–31	Portugal	Pabellón CE Vendrell, El Vendrell; Referees: El-Moamly, Abdelaziz (EGY)
28 June 2018; 20:00	Gheorghe, Trombetta 6	(15–16)	Correia 7	Pabellón CE Vendrell, El Vendrell; Referees: El-Moamly, Abdelaziz (EGY)
28 June 2018; 20:00	3× (yellow card) 1× (suspension)	Report	3× (yellow card) 3× (suspension)	Pabellón CE Vendrell, El Vendrell; Referees: El-Moamly, Abdelaziz (EGY)

=== Group B ===
Pos	Team	Pld	W	D	L	GF	GA	GD	Pts	Qualification
1	Montenegro	4	4	0	0	132	85	+47	8	Semifinals
2	North Macedonia	4	3	0	1	108	96	+12	6	Semifinals
3	Turkey	4	2	0	2	121	127	−6	4	5th place game
4	Serbia	4	1	0	3	108	118	−10	2	7th place game
5	Egypt	4	0	0	4	91	134	−43	0	

Source: Tarragona 2018
Rules for classification: 1) Points; 2) Head-to-head points; 3) Head-to-head goal difference; 4) Head-to-head goals scored; 5) Goal difference; 6) Goals scored; 7) Draw.

23 June 2018; 10:00	Montenegro	36–22	Serbia	Pabellón CE Vendrell, El Vendrell
23 June 2018; 10:00	Grbić 7	(16–6)	Terzić 5	Pabellón CE Vendrell, El Vendrell
23 June 2018; 10:00	3× (yellow card) 3× (suspension)	Report	1× (yellow card) 1× (suspension)	Pabellón CE Vendrell, El Vendrell

23 June 2018; 12:00	Turkey	26–31	North Macedonia	Pabellón CE Vendrell, El Vendrell; Referees: Alperan, Scevola (ITA)
23 June 2018; 12:00	Şahin 5	(11–15)	Gjorgjijevska, Ristovska 7	Pabellón CE Vendrell, El Vendrell; Referees: Alperan, Scevola (ITA)
23 June 2018; 12:00	3× (yellow card) 1× (suspension)	Report	3× (yellow card) 5× (suspension)	Pabellón CE Vendrell, El Vendrell; Referees: Alperan, Scevola (ITA)

24 June 2018; 10:00	Serbia	33–21	Egypt	Pabellón CE Vendrell, El Vendrell; Referees: Pinto, Santos (POR)
24 June 2018; 10:00	Janjušević, Rančić 5	(16–10)	Attiatalla 8	Pabellón CE Vendrell, El Vendrell; Referees: Pinto, Santos (POR)
24 June 2018; 10:00	2× (yellow card) 2× (suspension)	Report	2× (yellow card) 1× (suspension)	Pabellón CE Vendrell, El Vendrell; Referees: Pinto, Santos (POR)

24 June 2018; 12:00	Montenegro	34–21	Turkey	Pabellón CE Vendrell, El Vendrell; Referees: García, Rodríguez (ESP)
24 June 2018; 12:00	Premović 8	(17–12)	İskit 6	Pabellón CE Vendrell, El Vendrell; Referees: García, Rodríguez (ESP)
24 June 2018; 12:00	1× (yellow card) 5× (suspension)	Report	3× (yellow card) 4× (suspension)	Pabellón CE Vendrell, El Vendrell; Referees: García, Rodríguez (ESP)

25 June 2018; 10:00	Montenegro	34–19	Egypt	Pabellón CE Vendrell, El Vendrell; Referees: Chaskis, Tsakonas (GRE)
25 June 2018; 10:00	Despotović 6	(17–8)	Attiatalla 8	Pabellón CE Vendrell, El Vendrell; Referees: Chaskis, Tsakonas (GRE)
25 June 2018; 10:00	2× (yellow card) 7× (suspension) 1× (red card)	Report	3× (yellow card) 4× (suspension) 1× (red card)	Pabellón CE Vendrell, El Vendrell; Referees: Chaskis, Tsakonas (GRE)

25 June 2018; 12:00	Serbia	21–28	North Macedonia	Pabellón CE Vendrell, El Vendrell; Referees: García, Rodríguez (ESP)
25 June 2018; 12:00	Obradović 6	(13–16)	three players 6	Pabellón CE Vendrell, El Vendrell; Referees: García, Rodríguez (ESP)
25 June 2018; 12:00	1× (yellow card) 4× (suspension)	Report	1× (yellow card) 7× (suspension)	Pabellón CE Vendrell, El Vendrell; Referees: García, Rodríguez (ESP)

27 June 2018; 10:00	Turkey	41–30	Egypt	Pabellón CE Vendrell, El Vendrell; Referees: Hoz, Riloba (ESP)
27 June 2018; 10:00	Karameke 6	(22–12)	Mohamed 14	Pabellón CE Vendrell, El Vendrell; Referees: Hoz, Riloba (ESP)
27 June 2018; 10:00	2× (yellow card) 10× (suspension)	Report	2× (yellow card) 5× (suspension)	Pabellón CE Vendrell, El Vendrell; Referees: Hoz, Riloba (ESP)

27 June 2018; 12:00	Montenegro	28–23	North Macedonia	Pabellón CE Vendrell, El Vendrell; Referees: Pinto, Santos (POR)
27 June 2018; 12:00	Premović 7	(15–15)	Ristovska 7	Pabellón CE Vendrell, El Vendrell; Referees: Pinto, Santos (POR)
27 June 2018; 12:00	2× (yellow card) 3× (suspension)	Report	2× (yellow card) 4× (suspension)	Pabellón CE Vendrell, El Vendrell; Referees: Pinto, Santos (POR)

28 June 2018; 10:00	Serbia	32–33	Turkey	Pabellón CE Vendrell, El Vendrell; Referees: Ivanović, Vujisić (MNE)
28 June 2018; 10:00	Obradović 8	(17–15)	İskit 8	Pabellón CE Vendrell, El Vendrell; Referees: Ivanović, Vujisić (MNE)
28 June 2018; 10:00	2× (yellow card) 3× (suspension)	Report	3× (yellow card) 2× (suspension)	Pabellón CE Vendrell, El Vendrell; Referees: Ivanović, Vujisić (MNE)

28 June 2018; 12:00	North Macedonia	26–21	Egypt	Pabellón CE Vendrell, El Vendrell; Referees: Alperan, Scevola (ITA)
28 June 2018; 12:00	three players 4	(15–8)	Mohamed 6	Pabellón CE Vendrell, El Vendrell; Referees: Alperan, Scevola (ITA)
28 June 2018; 12:00	3× (yellow card) 2× (suspension)	Report	3× (yellow card) 3× (suspension)	Pabellón CE Vendrell, El Vendrell; Referees: Alperan, Scevola (ITA)

== Classification stage ==
=== Seventh place game ===
29 June 2018
17:30
Portugal
31–30 (ET)
Serbia
Pabellón CE Vendrell, El Vendrell
Referees: Alperan, Scevola (ITA)
Correia 9
(16–15)
Vukajlović 7
2× (yellow card) 6× (suspension) 1× (red card)
Report
3× (yellow card) 4× (suspension)

FT: 27–27 ET: 4–3

=== Fifth place game ===
29 June 2018; 20:00	Italy	22–27	Turkey	Pabellón CE Vendrell, El Vendrell; Referees: El-Moamly, Abdelaziz (EGY)
29 June 2018; 20:00	Gheorghe 7	(10–12)	İskit 8	Pabellón CE Vendrell, El Vendrell; Referees: El-Moamly, Abdelaziz (EGY)
29 June 2018; 20:00	3× (yellow card) 3× (suspension)	Report	3× (yellow card) 3× (suspension)	Pabellón CE Vendrell, El Vendrell; Referees: El-Moamly, Abdelaziz (EGY)

== Playoffs ==
=== Bracket ===
Semifinals
29 June
Spain	28
North Macedonia	21
29 June
Montenegro	26
Slovenia	23

Final
30 June
Spain	27
Montenegro	23
Third place
30 June
Slovenia	30
North Macedonia	29

=== Semifinals ===
29 June 2018; 17:30	Montenegro	26–23	Slovenia	Campclar Sports Palace, Tarragona; Referees: Deche, Ghouarda (ALG)
29 June 2018; 17:30	Premović 8	(12–13)	Stanko 8	Campclar Sports Palace, Tarragona; Referees: Deche, Ghouarda (ALG)
29 June 2018; 17:30	3× (yellow card) 6× (suspension)	Report	3× (yellow card) 7× (suspension)	Campclar Sports Palace, Tarragona; Referees: Deche, Ghouarda (ALG)

29 June 2018; 20:00	Spain	28–21	North Macedonia	Campclar Sports Palace, Tarragona; Referees: Chaskis, Tsakonas (GRE)
29 June 2018; 20:00	Rodríguez 7	(17–12)	Ristovska 9	Campclar Sports Palace, Tarragona; Referees: Chaskis, Tsakonas (GRE)
29 June 2018; 20:00	2× (yellow card) 5× (suspension)	Report	3× (yellow card) 4× (suspension)	Campclar Sports Palace, Tarragona; Referees: Chaskis, Tsakonas (GRE)

=== Bronze medal game ===
30 June 2018; 17:30	Slovenia	30–29	North Macedonia	Campclar Sports Palace, Tarragona; Referees: García, Rodríguez (ESP)
30 June 2018; 17:30	Stanko 12	(18–16)	Ristovska 7	Campclar Sports Palace, Tarragona; Referees: García, Rodríguez (ESP)
30 June 2018; 17:30	2× (yellow card) 2× (suspension)	Report	2× (yellow card) 2× (suspension)	Campclar Sports Palace, Tarragona; Referees: García, Rodríguez (ESP)

=== Final ===
30 June 2018; 20:00	Spain	27–23	Montenegro	Campclar Sports Palace, Tarragona; Referees: Pinto, Santos (POR)
30 June 2018; 20:00	Fernández 8	(13–11)	Jauković 9	Campclar Sports Palace, Tarragona; Referees: Pinto, Santos (POR)
30 June 2018; 20:00	1× (yellow card) 3× (suspension)	Report	1× (yellow card) 2× (suspension)	Campclar Sports Palace, Tarragona; Referees: Pinto, Santos (POR)

== Final standings ==
Rank	Team
1st place, gold medalist(s)	Spain
2nd place, silver medalist(s)	Montenegro
3rd place, bronze medalist(s)	Slovenia
4	North Macedonia
5	Turkey
6	Italy
7	Portugal
8	Serbia
9	Greece
10	Egypt
