= Érd HC in European handball =

Hungarian handball club

Érd HC is a Hungarian handball club, based in Érd, Hungary.

== European record ==
As of 16 July 2019:

Competition	Seasons	Year(s) in the competition	P	W	D	L	GF	GA	GD
EHF Champions League	1x	2013/14	2	1	0	1	58	56	+2
EHF Cup	6x	2012/13, 2014/15, 2016/17, 2017/18, 2018/19, 2019/20	26	17	0	9	766	683	+83
EHF Cup Winners' Cup (defunct)	2x	2013/14, 2015/16	10	8	0	2	268	225	+43
Source: kézitörténelem.hu	9 seasons		38	26	0	12	1092	964	+128

== EHF-organised seasonal competitions ==
Érd score listed first. As of 24 February 2020.

=== Champions League ===
Season	Round	Club	Home	Away	Aggregate
2013–14	Second qualification tournament (Group 2)	(Switzerland) LK Zug Handball	34-25		2nd CWC
2013–14	Second qualification tournament (Group 2)	(Hungary) FTC-Rail Cargo Hungária	24-31		2nd CWC

=== EHF Cup ===
Season	Round	Club	Home	Away	Aggregate
2012–13	Second round	(Belarus) Gorodnichanka	31-23	46-25	77–48
2012–13	Third round	(France) Metz Handball	37-31	26-32	63–63 (a)
2014–15	Third round	(Switzerland) SPONO Nottwil	33-18	32-21	65–39
2014–15	Round of 16	(Spain) Rocasa Gran Canaria ACE	30-22	31-23	61–45
2014–15	Quarter-finals	(Denmark) Team Esbjerg	28-20	29-28	57–48
2014–15	Semi-finals	(Russia) Rostov-Don	24-28	28-32	52–60
2016–17	Second qualifying round	(France) Issy-Paris Hand	30-26	29-26	59–52
2016–17	Third qualifying round	(Hungary) Dunaújvárosi Kohász KA	29-22	31-25	60–47
2016–17	Group stage (Group C)	(Russia) Rostov-Don	19-30	24-27	3rd
2016–17	Group stage (Group C)	(Germany) SG BBM Bietigheim	35-27	25-28	3rd
2016–17	Group stage (Group C)	(Norway) Byåsen Trondheim	34-22	28-35	3rd
2017–18	Third qualifying round	(France) Issy-Paris Hand	31-21	20-31	51–52
2018–19	Third qualifying round	(Norway) Storhamar HE	29-28	27-32	56–60
2019–20	Third qualifying round	(Russia) HC Kuban Krasnodar	39-32	25-30	64–62
2019–20	Group stage (Group C)	(Poland) MKS Perła Lublin	29-24	29-23	3rd
2019–20	Group stage (Group C)	(Romania) CS Gloria 2018 Bistrița-Năsăud	24–24	25-25	3rd
2019–20	Group stage (Group C)	(Denmark) Odense Håndbold	27-28	24-31	3rd

=== Cup Winners' Cup ===
From the 2016–17 season, the women's competition was merged with the EHF Cup.

Season	Round	Club	Home	Away	Aggregate
2013–14	Third round	(Netherlands) SERCODAK Dalfsen	21-20	26-23	47–43
2013–14	Round of 16	(Germany) Buxtehuder SV	32-23	22-31	54–54 (a)
2015–16	Third round	(Croatia) ŽRK Umag	31-18	36-24	67–42
2015–16	Round of 16	(Netherlands) SERCODAK Dalfsen	27-25	27-15	54–40
2015–16	Quarter-finals	(France) Issy-Paris Hand	29-28	17-18	46–46 (a)
