= Lamprini Tsàkalou =

Greek handball player (born 1993)

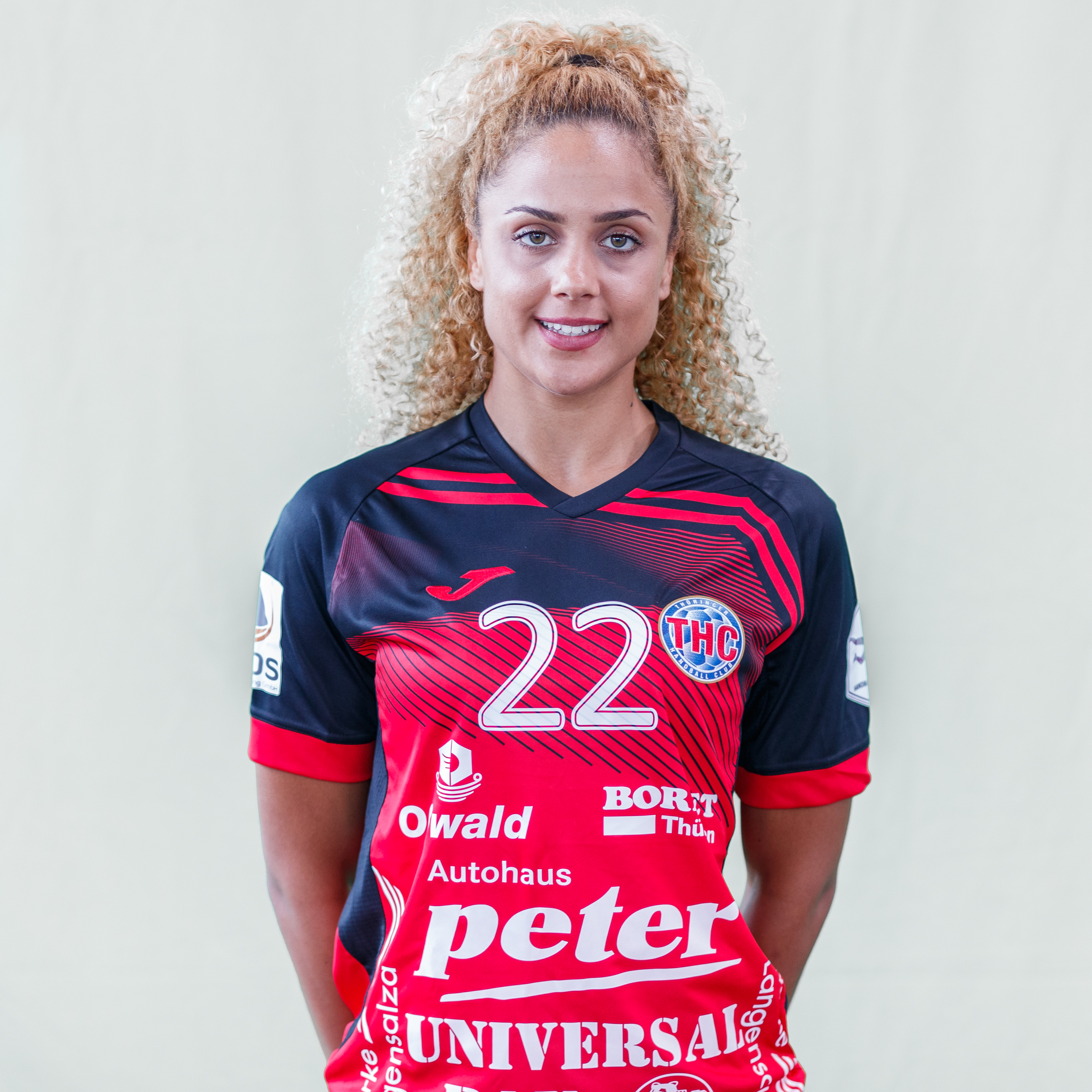

Personal information
- Nationality: Greek; Congolese
- Born: 7 August 1993 (age 33) Arta, Greece
- Height: 1.70 m (5 ft 7 in)

Sport
- Sport: Handball
- Position: Centre back / Right back
- Current club: PAOK H.C.

Senior clubs
- Years: Team
- 2008-2010: Anagennisi Arta
- 2010-2017: OF Nea Ionia
- 2017–2019: RK Krim
- 2019–2021: RK Podravka Koprivnica
- 2021–2022: Thüringer HC
- 2022–2024: AEK H.C.
National team
- Years: Team
- –: Greece

Lamprini "Labrina" Tsàkalou (Greek: Λαμπρινή Τσακάλου; born 7 August 1993) is a Greek female handballer who plays for PAOK H.C. and the Greece national team.

== Achievements ==
6 Trophies with OF Nea Ionia :

- Greek Championship:
  - Winner: 2014, 2015, 2016, 2017
- Greek Cup:
  - Winner: 2015, 2017

4 trophies with RK Krim:

- Slovenian Championship :
  - Winner: 2018, 2019
- Slovenian Cup:
  - Winner: 2018, 2019

1 trophy with RK Podravka Koprivnica:

- Croatian Championship :
  - Winner: 2021
