= P.A.O.K. women's Handball =

Greek handball club

PAOK
- Full name: Panthessalonikios Athlitikos Omilos Konstantinoupoliton Thessaloniki Handball Club
- Nicknames: Double-Headed Eagle of the North; White-Blacks
- Founded: 2007; 19 years ago
- Arena: Mikra Indoor Arena III
- Capacity: 1,380
- President: Nikolaos Paraskevopoulos
- Head coach: Dimitris Pelekidis
- League: Greek Women's Handball Championship
- 2025–26: 1st
- Club colours

PAOK Handball women's Club is a Greek handball based in Thessaloniki, Greece, and part of the major multi-sport club PAOK. So far, the club has won 7 Greek Championships, 8 Cups and two Super Cups. Despite its relatively short history, it is considered amongst the most successful departments of the club.

Location of P.A.O.K. H.C.

== History ==
=== Domestic ===
PAOK Handball Club was founded in 2007 and was promoted to Greek Women's Handball Championship for first in 2010–11 season. In 2013 won the first after beat Ormi at the finals In 2014 won the first Greek Women's Handball Cup after a victory with 22–20 at final against Anagennisi Artas at the final. From 2018 to 2022 PAOK won four consecutive doubles. In 2023 it won the fifth championship in a row and the MVP of the Finals was Katarina Tomašević. At the 2023–24 season the club won the first Greek Super Cup and the Greek Cup for the 7th time.

=== Europe ===
PAOK has played several times at EHF's Cups. The biggest achievement was in 2020–21 season when reached at the quarterfinals of the EHF Women's European Cup. At this phase eliminated by Malaga, after a 30–21 defeat and a 23–22 victory] This was the first victory form a Greek female team, against a Spanish for the European competitions.

== Team ==
=== Current squad ===
Squad for the 2026–27 season

P.A.O.K. H.C.

Goalkeepers

- 1 (Greece) Emanuela Tsiknaki
- 99 (Brazil) Naira De Almeida

Left Wingers

- 6 (Greece) Maria Mentesidou
- 28 (Greece) Danai Selemidou

Right Wingers

- 2 (Greece) Eleni Kerlidi
- 13 (Greece) Chrysi Trochidou

Line Players

- 19 (Brazil) Milena De Souza
- 26 (Montenegro) Milica Grbavcevic
- 92 (Serbia) Jovana Milojevic

Left Backs

- 5 (Greece) Elina Trochidou
- 14 (Greece) Eleni Mournou
- 18 (Greece) Avramina Sevdili

Central Backs

- 20 (Greece) Olina Andritsou

Right Backs

- 8 (Greece) Vasiliki Gkatziou
- 22 (Greece) Lamprini Tsàkalou
- 27 (Montenegro) Sanja Premovic
- 88 (Brazil) Barbara Brocardo Buratto

=== Technical staff ===
- Head coach: (Greece) Dimitrios Pelekidis
- Assistant coach: (Greece) Vassilis Skandalis
- Team manager: (Greece) Dimitrios Chasekidis
- Team assistant: (Greece) Panagiotis Mavrogenidis
- Team assistant: (Greece) Antonis Metsis
- Goalkeeper trainor: (Greece) Andreas Orfanoudakis
- Physiotherapist: (Greece) Panagiotis Papadopoulos

== Honours ==
- Greek Women's Handball Championship:
  - Winners (7): 2013, 2019, 2020, 2021, 2022, 2023, 2026
- Greek Women's Handball Cup
  - Winners (8): 2014, 2016, 2019, 2020, 2021, 2022, 2024, 2026
- Greek Women's Handball Super Cup:
  - Winners (2): 2023, 2026
- Greek Women's Handball Treble:
  - Winners (1): 2026

== Recent seasons ==
Season	Division	Place	Notes
2010–11	A1 Ethniki	4th	
2011–12	A1 Ethniki	4th	
2012–13	A1 Ethniki	1st	
2013–14	A1 Ethniki	3rd	Greek Cup Winners
2014–15	A1 Ethniki	3rd	Greek Cup Finalists
2015–16	A1 Ethniki	2nd	Greek Cup Winners
2016–17	A1 Ethniki	2nd	
2017–18	A1 Ethniki	2nd	Greek Cup Finalists
2018–19	A1 Ethniki	1st	Greek Cup Winners
2019–20	A1 Ethniki	1st	Greek Cup Winners
2020–21	A1 Ethniki	1st	Greek Cup Winners
2021–22	A1 Ethniki	1st	Greek Cup Winners
2022–23	A1 Ethniki	1st	Greek Cup Finalists
2023–24	A1 Ethniki	2nd	Greek Cup Winners
2024–25	A1 Ethniki	2nd	Greek Cup Finalists
2025–26	A1 Ethniki	1st	Greek Cup Winners

== European Record ==
Season	Competition	Round	Club	Home	Away	Aggregate	Advance
2011–12	EHF Challenge Cup	R3	(Ukraine) HC Dnepryanka Kherson	22–28	17–27	39–55	
2012–13	EHF Challenge Cup	R3	(Poland) KSS Kielce	18–31	23–25	41–56	
2013–14	EHF Cup	R2	(Bulgaria) HSC Veliko Tarnovo	28–20	22–24	50–44	
2013–14	EHF Cup	R3	(Romania) U Jolidon Cluj	28–32	25–39	53–71	
2017–18	EHF Challenge Cup	R3	(Bosnia and Herzegovina) OZRK Jedinstvo Tuzla	24–17	30–31	54–48	
2017–18	EHF Challenge Cup	1/8	(Croatia) Lokomotiva Zagreb	17–37	20–33	37-70	
2019–20	EHF Cup	R1	(Turkey) Muratpaşa BSK	32–25	24-24	56-49	
2019–20	EHF Cup	R2	(Serbia) ŽORK Jagodina	25–23	19–26	44-49	
2020–21	EHF European Cup	R3	(Malta) Kavallieri	36–8	46–16	82-24	
2020–21	EHF European Cup	1/8	(Croatia) ŽRK Bjelovar	28–21	30–24	58-45	
2020–21	EHF European Cup	1/4	(Spain) CBF Málaga	23–22	21–30	44-52	
2021–22	EHF European Cup	R2	(Iceland) IBV Vestmannaeyjar	29–24	22–29	51-53	
2022–23	EHF European Cup	R2	(North Macedonia) ŽRK Metalurg	26–17	31–20	57-37	
2022–23	EHF European Cup	R3	(Poland) KPR Kobierzyce	23–28	23–26	46-54	
2023–24	EHF European League	QR2	(Germany) VfL Oldenburg	22–37	25-25	47-62	
2024–25	EHF European Cup	R2	(Switzerland) Spono Eagles	25–21	33–27	48-58	
2024–25	EHF European Cup	R3	(Faroe Islands) H71	23–30	31–23	54-53	
2024–25	EHF European Cup	1/8	(Slovakia) MKS Iuventa Michalovce	30–22	17–27	47-49	
2025–26	EHF European Cup	R2	(Kosovo) KHF Samadrexha	38–28	34–20	72-48	
2025–26	EHF European Cup	R3	(Austria) WAT Atzgersdorf	27–25	35-28	62–53	
2025–26	EHF European Cup	1/8	(Portugal) Madeira Andebol SAD	37–26	19-20	56–46	
2025–26	EHF European Cup	QF	(Turkey) Bursa Büyükşehir SK	34–29	30–36	64–65	

== Notable former players ==
- (Greece) Maria Chatziparasidou
- (Greece) Agni Zygoura
- (Brazil) Elaine Gomes
- (Croatia) Selena Milošević
- (North Macedonia) Andrea Beleska
- (North Macedonia) Sanja Dabevska
- (North Macedonia) Marija Nikolic
- (Serbia) Katarina Tomašević
- (Slovenia) Teja Ferfolja
