= 2015 Copa de la Reina de Balonmano =

XXXVI Copa de la Reina

Tournament details
- Venue(s): Pabellón Ciutat de Castelló (in Castellón de la Plana host cities)
- Dates: 20 – 22 February
- Teams: 16 (round of 16); 8 (final eight)

Final positions
- Champions: Rocasa G.C. ACE (1st title)
- Runner-up: Bera Bera

Tournament statistics
- Matches played: 7
- Goals scored: 350 (50 per match)
- Attendance: 5,750 (821 per match)

The 2015 Copa de la Reina de Balonmano was the 36th edition of the Copa de la Reina de Balonmano. It took place in Castellón de la Plana, city of the Valencian Community, from 20 to 22 February. The matches were played at Pabellón Ciutat de Castelló, with 6,000 capacity seating. It was hosted by Federación Valenciana de Balonmano, Comunidad de Madrid, Castellón municipality & RFEBM. Castellón hosted Copa de la Reina for the last time in 1982.

Rocasa G.C. ACE won its first-ever title after defeating BM Bera Bera in the Final 20–19.

== Venue ==
Castellón within Spain

Pabellón Ciutat de Castelló
Capacity: 6,000
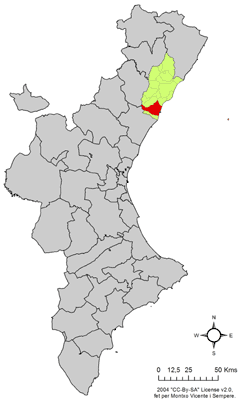
Castellón de la Plana

== First round ==
Team 1	Score	Team 2
Carobels Cleba (Castile and León)	20–26	(Community of Madrid) Helvetia Alcobendas
Sporting La Rioja	22–25	(Valencian Community) Elche Mustang
KH-7 Granollers (Catalonia)	32–31	(Galicia (Spain)) Porriño
Canyamelar Valencia (Valencian Community)	30–22	(Basque Country (autonomous community)) Prosetecnisa Zuazo
Jofemesa Oviedo (Asturias)	19–30	(Galicia (Spain)) Mecalia Atl. Guardés
Vivelafruta.com Castelldefels (Catalonia)	32–34	(Castile and León) Aula Cultural
Adesal Córdoba (Andalusia)	15–28	(Basque Country (autonomous community)) Bera Bera
Clínicas Rincón Málaga Costa del Sol (Andalusia)	26–37	(Canary Islands) Rocasa G.C. ACE

Teams qualified to Final Eight
Helvetia Alcobendas	Elche Mustang	KH-7 Granollers	Canyamelar Valencia
Mecalia Atl. Guardés	Aula Cultural	Bera Bera	Rocasa G.C. ACE

== Final Eight ==
Quarter-finals
Bera Bera	29
Elche Mustang	26
Canyamelar Valencia	24
Mecalia Atl. Guardés	37
Aula Cultural	26
KH-7 Granollers	23
Helvetia Alcobendas	27
Rocasa G.C. ACE	28

Semi-finals
Bera Bera	23
Mecalia Atl. Guardés	19
Aula Cultural	23
Rocasa G.C. ACE	26

Final
Bera Bera	19
Rocasa G.C. ACE	20

=== Matches ===
==== Quarter-finals ====
20 February; 12:00 (UTC+1)	Aula Cultural	26–23	KH-7 Granollers	Pabellón Ciutat de Castelló, Castellón de la Plana; Attendance: 300; Referees: Hermoso Del Amo, Monjo Ortega
20 February; 12:00 (UTC+1)	A Fernández 8	(10–10)	S Pérez 6	Pabellón Ciutat de Castelló, Castellón de la Plana; Attendance: 300; Referees: Hermoso Del Amo, Monjo Ortega
20 February; 12:00 (UTC+1)	1× (yellow card) 3× (suspension)	Report^{[usurped]}	3× (yellow card) 3× (suspension)	Pabellón Ciutat de Castelló, Castellón de la Plana; Attendance: 300; Referees: Hermoso Del Amo, Monjo Ortega

20 February; 16:00 (UTC+1)	Helvetia Alcobendas	27–28	Rocasa G.C. ACE	Pabellón Ciutat de Castelló, Castellón de la Plana; Attendance: 600; Referees: Álvarez Mata, Bustamante López
20 February; 16:00 (UTC+1)	Aramendía 6	(13–15)	A Rodríguez 10	Pabellón Ciutat de Castelló, Castellón de la Plana; Attendance: 600; Referees: Álvarez Mata, Bustamante López
20 February; 16:00 (UTC+1)	2× (yellow card) 5× (suspension)	Report^{[usurped]}	1× (yellow card) 6× (suspension)	Pabellón Ciutat de Castelló, Castellón de la Plana; Attendance: 600; Referees: Álvarez Mata, Bustamante López

20 February
18:00 (UTC+1)
Bera Bera
29–26 (ET)
Elche Mustang
Pabellón Ciutat de Castelló, Castellón de la Plana
Attendance: 750
Referees: García Mosquera, Muro San José
Pinedo, Núñez 7
(12–12)
Popović 8
3× (yellow card) 5× (suspension)
Report^{[usurped]}
1× (yellow card) 3× (suspension)

FT: 23–23 ET: 6–3

20 February; 20:00 (UTC+1)	Canyamelar Valencia	24–37	Mecalia Atl. Guardés	Pabellón Ciutat de Castelló, Castellón de la Plana; Attendance: 800; Referees: Fernández Pérez, García Rodríguez
20 February; 20:00 (UTC+1)	Payá 8	(10–20)	Kurchankova 6	Pabellón Ciutat de Castelló, Castellón de la Plana; Attendance: 800; Referees: Fernández Pérez, García Rodríguez
20 February; 20:00 (UTC+1)	3× (yellow card) 3× (suspension)	Report^{[usurped]}	3× (yellow card) 8× (suspension)	Pabellón Ciutat de Castelló, Castellón de la Plana; Attendance: 800; Referees: Fernández Pérez, García Rodríguez

==== Semifinals ====
21 February; 16:00 (UTC+1)	Bera Bera	23–19	Mecalia Atl. Guardés	Pabellón Ciutat de Castelló, Castellón de la Plana; Attendance: 1,100; Referees: García Serradilla, Marín Lorente
21 February; 16:00 (UTC+1)	Núñez 5	(13–8)	Egozkue, Benzal 5	Pabellón Ciutat de Castelló, Castellón de la Plana; Attendance: 1,100; Referees: García Serradilla, Marín Lorente
21 February; 16:00 (UTC+1)	3× (yellow card) 3× (suspension)	Report^{[usurped]}	2× (yellow card) 4× (suspension)	Pabellón Ciutat de Castelló, Castellón de la Plana; Attendance: 1,100; Referees: García Serradilla, Marín Lorente

21 February; 18:15 (UTC+1)	Aula Cultural	23–26	Rocasa G.C. ACE	Pabellón Ciutat de Castelló, Castellón de la Plana; Attendance: 1,000; Referees: Fernández Pérez, García Rodríguez
21 February; 18:15 (UTC+1)	A Fernández 7	(14–14)	D López 8	Pabellón Ciutat de Castelló, Castellón de la Plana; Attendance: 1,000; Referees: Fernández Pérez, García Rodríguez
21 February; 18:15 (UTC+1)	2× (yellow card) 1× (suspension)	Report^{[usurped]}	3× (yellow card) 5× (suspension)	Pabellón Ciutat de Castelló, Castellón de la Plana; Attendance: 1,000; Referees: Fernández Pérez, García Rodríguez

==== Final ====
22 February
13:00 (UTC+1)
Bera Bera
19–20 (ET)
Rocasa G.C. ACE
Pabellón Ciutat de Castelló, Castellón de la Plana
Attendance: 1,200
Referees: Álvarez Mata, Bustamante López
Pinedo 7
(5–9)
Luján 5
2× (yellow card) 3× (suspension)
Report^{[usurped]}
3× (yellow card) 1× (suspension)

FT: 16–16 ET: 3–4

2015 Copa de la Reina de Balonmano winners
(Canary Islands)
Rocasa G.C. ACE
First title

== Top goalscorers ==
Rank	Name	Team	Goals
1	María Luján	Rocasa G.C. ACE	19
2	Elisabeth Pinedo	BM Bera Bera	17
3	Almudena Rodríguez	Rocasa G.C. ACE	16
4	Maria Núñez	BM Bera Bera	13
5	Davinia López	Rocasa G.C. ACE	12

Source: own compilation

== See also ==
- 2014–15 División de Honor Femenina de Balonmano
