= A1 Ethniki (disambiguation) =

A1 Ethniki may refer to:

- A1 Ethniki, the 1st-tier Greek basketball League
- A1 Ethniki Volleyball, the 1st-tier Greek volleyball League
- A1 Ethniki Water Polo, the 1st-tier Greek water polo League
- A1 Ethniki Handball, the 1st-tier Greek handball League
- A1 Ethniki Women's Basketball, the 1st-tier Greek women's basketball League
- A1 Ethniki Women's Volleyball, the 1st-tier Greek women's volleyball League
- A1 Ethniki Women's Water Polo, the 1st-tier Greek women's water polo League
- A1 Ethniki Women's Handball, the 1st-tier Greek women's handball League
