= Alexandros Xydis =

Greek diplomat, historian and art critic

Alexandros Xydis (1918–2004) was a Greek diplomat, historian, and art critic.

== Biography ==
Born to Georgios Xydis and Alexandra Dragoumi, he descended from the prominent Dragoumis family and was the grandson of Prime Minister Stefanos Dragoumis. His siblings were Stefanos Xydis and Faini Xydis. Xydis pursued a career in the Diplomatic Corps, serving in Casablanca, Canberra, London, and Damascus. In London during the 1950s, he worked alongside the poet George Seferis, with whom he shared a close friendship.

Xydis was a significant art critic of his time and a founding member of the Society of Greek Art Critics, serving as its president. He began engaging with art in 1938 and maintained a large collection of engravings and paintings, which he donated to the Macedonian Museum of Contemporary Art. Part of his archive was also donated to the Contemporary Social History Archives (ASKI). He authored several books on art and the Cyprus issue and was the publisher of the journal Tetradio.

During the seven-year military junta in Greece, Xydis participated in the resistance against the regime as a member of the Democratic Defense, alongside his wife Dorothea. He was a friend of Andreas Papandreou and, after the restoration of democracy, became a founding member of the PASOK party and its first Central Committee. However, he was expelled from the party in 1975. He continued his political activism with the Socialist March and later as a founding member of the Synaspismos.

Xydis' residence in the Mets, Athens, was designed by architect Aris Konstantinidis and is considered one of his most notable works.

He died in Athens on November 10, 2004, and was buried in the First Cemetery of Athens. He was married and had children.
