= 2016–17 Greek Handball League (women) =

A1 Ethniki
- Season: 2016–17
- Champions: OF Nea Ionia
- Relegated: Panetolikos; Arion Ptolemaida
- Matches: 111
- Goals: 4,748 (42.77 per match)
- Top goalscorer: (Romania) Cristina Elena Ciobanu (191 goals)

The 2016–17 Greek A1 Ethniki was the 35th season of the A1 Ethniki, Greece's premier handball women's league. It ran from 10 October 2016 to 12 May 2017.

== Teams ==
Location of teams in Greek A1 Ethniki 2016-17

A total of 10 teams participated in this year's edition of the Women's A1 Ethniki. Of these, 6 sides qualified directly from the 2015–16 season, while 4 sides qualified from the A2 Ethniki play-offs: Panetolikos, Arion Ptolemaida, Honda Panorama and Filippos Veria.

Club	Home city
Amyntas Amyntaio	Amyntaio
Feta Ipiros Anagennisi Arta	Arta
Arion Ptolemaida	Ptolemaida
Filippos Veria	Veria
Filotas Florina	Florina
Megas Alexandros Giannitsa	Giannitsa
OF Nea Ionia	Nea Ionia, Athens
Panetolikos	Agrinio
Honda Panorama	Panorama, Thessaloniki
PAOK	Thessaloniki

== Regular season ==
=== League table ===
Pos	Team	Pld	W	D	L	GF	GA	GD	Pts	Qualification or relegation
1	OF Nea Ionia	18	18	0	0	565	332	+233	36	Qualification to 2016-17 Finals
2	PAOK	18	16	0	2	608	352	+256	32	Qualification to 2016-17 Finals
3	Anagennisi Arta (Note: Anagennisi Arta were deducted 1 point as they did not show up to the last league game against PAOK. PAOK were awarded a 10-0 win.)	18	13	0	5	501	424	+77	25	
4	Megas Alexandros	18	10	1	7	470	457	+13	21	
5	Honda Panorama	18	6	5	7	420	475	−55	17	
6	Filotas Florina	18	7	2	9	415	485	−70	16	
7	Amyntas Amyntaio	18	6	1	11	430	484	−54	13	
8	Filippos Veria	18	5	2	11	415	476	−61	12	
9	Panetolikos (Note: Panetolikos were deducted 3 points as they did not show up to the last three league games against OF Nea Ionia, Panorama and Megas Alexandros. All three opponents were awarded a 10-0 win.) (R)	18	3	1	14	345	466	−121	5	Relegation to 2017–18 A2 Ethniki
10	Arion Ptolemaida (Note: Arion Ptolemaida were deducted 1 point as they did not show up to the matchday 14 game against OF Nea Ionia. OF Nea Ionia were awarded a 10-0 win.) (R)	18	0	0	18	433	661	−228	−1	Relegation to 2017–18 A2 Ethniki

Source: Hellenic Handball Federation
Rules for classification: 1) Points; 2) Head-to-head points; 3) Head-to-head goal difference; 4) Head-to-head away goals (if 2 teams are tied); 5) Head-to-head goals scored (if more than 2 teams are tied); 6) Goal difference; 7) Goals scored; 8) Draw or single play-off game (only used if needed to decide champion, teams for relegation or qualification for European competitions).
(R) Relegated

=== Results ===
Home \ Away	AMY	ANA	ARI	VER	FLO	MEG	OFN	PAN	PNT	PAO
Amyntas Amyntaio	—	18–30	39–33	28–26	25–23	22–29	16–27	23–23	25–24	17–33
Anagennisi Arta	28–23	—	44–31	26–23	25–19	28–23	20–28	32–25	27–21	26–31
Arion Ptolemaida	27–36	26–36	—	22–36	29–31	28–36	22–56	28–30	34–35	24–54
Filippos Veria	25–29	18–33	33–25	—	21–14	18–19	21–37	17–17	25–23	18–27
Filotas Florina	23–21	25–21	25–20	33–27	—	18–17	21–33	29–29	19–19	20–37
Megas Alexandros	28–27	29–33	48–30	23–20	33–27	—	25–39	34–24	27–20	23–30
OF Nea Ionia	24–13	27–25	10–0	37–20	42–20	37–25	—	40–19	10–0	29–25
Honda Panorama	24–23	24–28	30–23	21–21	26–33	23–23	21–28	—	10–0	22–37
Panetolikos	28–27	23–39	30–24	21–24	25–29	0–10	18–35	25–29	—	20–33
PAOK	29–18	10–0	52–17	41–22	35–16	33–18	21–26	41–23	39–13	—

Source: Hellenic Handball Federation
Legend: Blue = home team win; Yellow = draw; Red = away team win.
For upcoming matches, an "a" indicates there is an article about the rivalry between the two participants.

== Finals ==
In the finals, teams playing against each other have to win three games to win the series. Thus, if one team wins three games before all five games have been played, the remaining games are omitted. The team that finished in the higher championship play-off place, is going to play the first, second and fifth (if necessary) game of the series at home.

Team 1	Agg.	Team 2	Game 1	Game 2	Game 3	Game 4	Game 5
OF Nea Ionia	3–0	PAOK	36–20	21–16	23–20	–	–

Source: Hellenic Handball Federation
