= Greece women's national handball team =

Information
- Association: Hellenic Handball Federation Greek: Ομοσπονδία Χειροσφαιρίσεως Ελλάδος

Colours
1st	2nd

Results

Summer Olympics
- Appearances: 1 (First in 2004)
- Best result: 10th

World Championship
- Appearances: 0

European Championship
- Appearances: 1 (First in 2026)
- Last updated on 17 August 2026.

Greece women's national handball team is the national team of Greece. It takes part in international team handball competitions. It is controlled by the Hellenic Handball Federation.

The team participated at the 2004 Summer Olympics, where they were qualified as hosts. The team finished the tournament in 10th. The first time the team managed to qualify for a tournament was the 2026 European Women's Handball Championship.

== Results ==
=== Olympics ===
- 2004 – 10th

=== European Championship ===
- 2026 – Qualified

=== Mediterranian Games ===
- 2001 Mediterranean Games – 8th
- 2005 Mediterranean Games – 8th
- 2009 Mediterranean Games – 9th
- 2018 Mediterranean Games – Preliminary rounds
- 2026 Mediterranean Games – (bronze)

== Current squad ==
The preliminary extended squad for the 2026 European Women's Handball Championship.

Head coach: Danilos Menelaos

No.	Pos.	Name	Date of birth (age)	Height	App.	Goals	Club
1	GK	Magdalini Kepesidou	21 April 1997 (age 29)	1.78 m	51	6	(Greece) O.F.N. Ionias
2	RB	Eleni Kerlidi	23 October 2000 (age 26)	1.78 m	26	62	(Greece) AC PAOK
3	RB	Panagiota Argiropolou	16 June 1998 (age 28)	1.74 m	29	31	(Greece) AEP Panorama
4	LB	Agni Papadopoulou	4 December 2003 (age 22)	1.75 m	9	10	(Greece) AEP Panorama
6	LW	Maria Mentesidou	31 May 1997 (age 29)	1.67 m	19	12	(Greece) AC PAOK
7	CB	Aikaterini Koukmisi	13 September 2000 (age 26)	1.69 m	11	3	(Greece) AEP Panorama
8	RW	Vasiliki Gkatziou	8 October 1997 (age 29)	1.68 m	25	57	(Greece) AC PAOK
10	CB	Nikolina Kepesidou	18 January 2002 (age 24)	1.78 m	30	43	(Greece) O.F.N. Ionias
13	RW	Evgenia Samolada	31 January 2000 (age 26)	1.80 m	19	34	(Greece) AEK Athens
14	LB	Erika Zeneli	13 May 2000 (age 26)	1.75 m	31	24	(Greece) AEK Athens
16	GK	Emmanouela Tsiknaki	20 September 2000 (age 26)	1.67 m	28	0	(Greece) AC PAOK
18	RB	Despoina Fragkou	18 May 1999 (age 27)	1.75 m	27	14	(Greece) AEK Athens
20	CB	Olympia Andritsou	8 January 1998 (age 28)	1.67 m	36	120	(Greece) AC PAOK
21	RB	Aikaterini Mania	28 September 1998 (age 28)	1.73 m	32	47	(Greece) AEK Athens
22	LB	Lamprini Tsakalou	7 August 1993 (age 33)	1.76 m	38	192	(Greece) AC PAOK
23	LW	Eleftheria-Aikaterini Trochidou	1 January 2001 (age 25)	1.65 m	8	8	(Greece) AC PAOK
31	CB	Anastasia Vasileiou	23 July 2001 (age 25)	1.71 m	9	6	(Greece) GAS Kamaterou
32	P	Ioanna Christopoulou	7 August 2001 (age 25)	1.70 m	8	2	(Greece) GAS Kamaterou
39	CB	Avramina Sevdili	18 July 2002 (age 24)	1.71 m	24	32	(Greece) AC PAOK
40	GK	Athina Kaprinioti	25 September 2004 (age 22)	1.82 m	4	0	(Greece) Anagennisi Artas
99	LW	Christa-Maria Stougiannidou	26 April 1996 (age 30)	1.67 m	26	45	(Greece) O.F.N. Ionias
