= Athinaikos H.C. =

Greek handball club

- Founded: 1970; 56 years ago
- Arena: Ergani Indoor Hall, Vyronas
- Capacity: 1200
- League: Beta Ethniki
Home	Away

Athinaikos H.C. is a Greek handball club based in Vyronas, in the Athens agglomeration. The club is the handball section of Greek multisport club of Athinaikos. It is one of the most successful Greek handball club with titles both Men's and Women's team.

== History ==
Athinaikos is one of the first clubs competed in the championship that was founded in the late of 1970s. Athinaikos won one Men's Championship and three Men's cups, two of them was consecutive, as well as two women's championships and three women's cups. Men's team of Athinaikos played three times in EHF Competitions and women's team played four times in Women's EHF Competitions. Despite the successful presence, Athinaikos was withdrawn from championship in 2006 due to financial problems. The club remained inactive for 9 years and returned in 2015-16 season playing in Beta Ethniki championship (3rd tier).

== Team ==
=== Current squad ===
Squad for the 2025–26 season

Goalkeepers
Left Wingers
Right Wingers
Line players

Left Backs
Central Backs
Right Backs

=== Transfers ===
Transfers for the 2026–27 season

Joining

Leaving

- (Greece) Eleftherios Papazoglou (GK) to (Austria) Alpla HC Hard

=== Transfer History ===
Transfers for the 2025–26 season

Joining

- (Austria) (Hungary) József Albek (LB) from (Austria) HSG Graz

Leaving

- (Austria) (Hungary) József Albek (LB) from (Hungary) PLER-Budapest

=== Recent Seasons (Men's team) ===
Season	Division	Place	Notes
2001-02	A1 Ethniki	8th	
2002-03	A1 Ethniki	8th	
2003-04	A1 Ethniki	4th	
2004-05	A1 Ethniki	1st	Winner Greek Cup
2005-06	A1 Ethniki	2nd	Winner Greek Cup
2006-07	A1 Ethniki	12th	Withdrawn from championship
2007-15	Inactive		
2015-16	Beta Ethniki		

== Honours and achievements ==
Men's Team

- Greek Men's Handball Championship
  - Winner (1): 2005
- Greek Men's Handball Cup
  - Winner (3): 1997, 2005, 2006

Women's Team

- Greek Women's Handball Championship
  - Winner (2): 1987, 1988
- Greek Women's Handball Cup
  - Winner (3): 1988, 1995, 1997
