= CSM Ploiești (women's handball) =

Romanian women's handball club

- Full name: Clubul Sportiv Municipal Ploiești
- Short name: CSM Ploiești
- Founded: 2004
- Arena: Olimpia
- Capacity: 3,500
- President: Paul Iancu
- League: Liga Națională
- Club colours
Home	Away

CSM Ploiești is a women's handball club from Ploieşti, Romania, that plays in the Liga Națională.

== Kits ==
HOME
2015–16	2020-

AWAY

2015–16

== European record ==
Season	Competition	Round	Club	1st leg	2nd leg	Aggregate
2016–17	EHF Cup	R1	(Faroe Islands) Neistin Tórshavn	26–24	31–20	57–44
2016–17	EHF Cup	R2	(Slovakia) Michalovce	19–43	14–49	33–92
