= Vyronas National Stadium =

Stadium in Vyronas, Athens, Greece

Coordinates: 37.9586°N 23.7693°E

The National Stadium of Vyronas is located in the town of Vyronas, located east of Athens, at the foot of Mount Imittos, only 3 km away from Athens city proper. The stadium is next to the cemetery, in the end of Vyronas.

The stadium was created in an old quarry, so it is also known as the "damaria", which means quarry. It was built in 1990 and belongs to the Municipality of Vyronas. It is the home of Athinaikos. The record attendance is 5,803 for a match between Athinaikos and Panathinaikos in 1991. The current seating capacity is 4,340.
