= Selena Milošević =

Croatian handball player (born 1989)

Personal information
- Nationality: Croatian
- Born: 9 June 1989 (age 37) Pula, SR Croatia, SFR Yugoslavia
- Height: 1.75 m (5 ft 9 in)

Sport
- Sport: Handball
- Position: Centre back

Senior clubs
- Years: Team
- ŽRK Rovinj
- –2012: ŽRK Arena Pula
- 2012–2013: ŽRK Umag
- 2013–2015: ŽRK Zamet
- 2015–2017: RK Podravka Koprivnica
- 2017–2018: Maccabi Ramat Gan
- 2018–2023: RK Podravka Koprivnica
- 2023: PAOK
National team
Years	Team	Apps	(Gls)
–	Croatia	13	(7)

Selena Milošević (born 9 June 1989) is a Croatian handball player for RK Podravka Koprivnica and the Croatian national team.

She participated at the 2018 European Women's Handball Championship.
