= Athinaikos A.C. =

Greek multisport club

- Full name: Athinaikos Athletic Club; Αθηναϊκός Α.Σ.
- Nickname: Lords of Vyronas
- Founded: 1917
- Based in: Vyronas, Greece
- Colours: Red, Yellow
- Titles: European Titles: 1

Athinaikos A.C. (Greek: Αθηναϊκός Α.Σ., full name Athinaikos Athletic Club) is a Greek multisport-club, founded in 1917. It is based in Vyronas, a suburb east of Athens. Athinaikos has football, basketball, and handball teams. Its achievements comprise Panhellenic championships and cups in women's basketball, Panhellenic championships and cups in women's and men's handball, as well as a European cup in women's basketball. The team's colours are red and yellow and the team’s emblem is a plane-tree leaf. The nickname of the club is Lords of Vyronas.

== Departments ==
- Athinaikos F.C., football team
- Athinaikos B.C., basketball team
- Athinaikos H.C., handball team

== History ==
Athinaikos was founded in 1917 by former footballers of Goudi F.C. During interwar period, apart from the football team the club had also teams in shooting, swimming, and athletics. The team's offices were located in the centre of Athens in Chalkokondyles Street. The offices were burnt in 1944, when Dekemvriana took place. In 1952, Athinaikos merged with the club Nea Elvetia AE, a sport club of the Vyronas' district Nea Elvetia and moved from Athens to Vyronas. In 1969, the basketball team was founded and at the late of 1970s handball team was founded. Handball team won many titles and honours in the period that had been existed. This team was dissolved temporarily in 2006 because of financial problems, but returned in 2015 starting from Beta Ethniki championship. In 1990 was founded the women basketball team, maybe the most successful team of the club. The women team won 4 championships, 3 cups and 1 European cup. It is also achieved the record of 105 consecutive wins in the championship, surpassing the previous record of 91 consecutive wins. The record has been recorded in Guinness records. Football team of Athinaikos is the most popular team of the club. The most successful period of the team is the 90s when Athinaikos had almost steady presence in Alpha Ethniki, one presence in the final of the Greek Cup and they even had a presence in the UEFA Cup Winners' Cup. This period often called the golden age of Athinaikos.

== Sport Facilities ==
Athinaikos F.C. plays in Vyronas National Stadium. The Basketball team plays in Ergani Indoor Hall, a gymnasium located in Vyronas.

== Titles ==
Athinaikos F.C.

- Greek Football Cup
  - Runners-up (1): 1989–90

Athinaikos B.C.

- EuroCup Women
  - Winner (1): 2010
- Greek Women Championship
  - Winner (5): 2009, 2010, 2011, 2012, 2026
- Greek Women Cup
  - Winner (4): 2010, 2011, 2012, 2026

Athinaikos Handball Club

- Greek Championship
  - Winner (1): 2005
- Greek Cup
  - Winner (3): 1997, 2005, 2006
- Greek Women Championship
  - Winner (2): 1987, 1988
- Greek Women Cup
  - Winner (3): 1988, 1995, 1997
