= Bnei Herzliya (handball) =

Handball club, Herzliya, Israel

- Full name: Bnei Herzliya
- Arena: Herzliya Hall
- League: Ligat Winner (men), Ligat Ha'Al (women)
- 2015-2016: 1st (women)

Bnei Herzliya is a handball club from Herzliya in Israel. Bnei Herzliya competes in the Ligat Winner (men) and Ligat Ha'Al (women).

== Women's team ==
=== Honours ===
- Ligat Ha'Al
  - Winners (9) : 2007, 2008, 2009, 2010, 2011, 2012, 2013, 2014, 2016
- Israel Handball Cup
  - Winners (10) : 2006, 2007, 2009, 2010, 2011, 2012, 2014, 2015, 2016, 2017

=== European record ===
Season	Competition	Round	Club	Home	Away	Aggregate
2016-17	EHF Cup	R1	(Germany) VfL Oldenburg	20–36	20–41	40–77
