= Almudena Rodríguez =

Spanish handball player (born 1993)

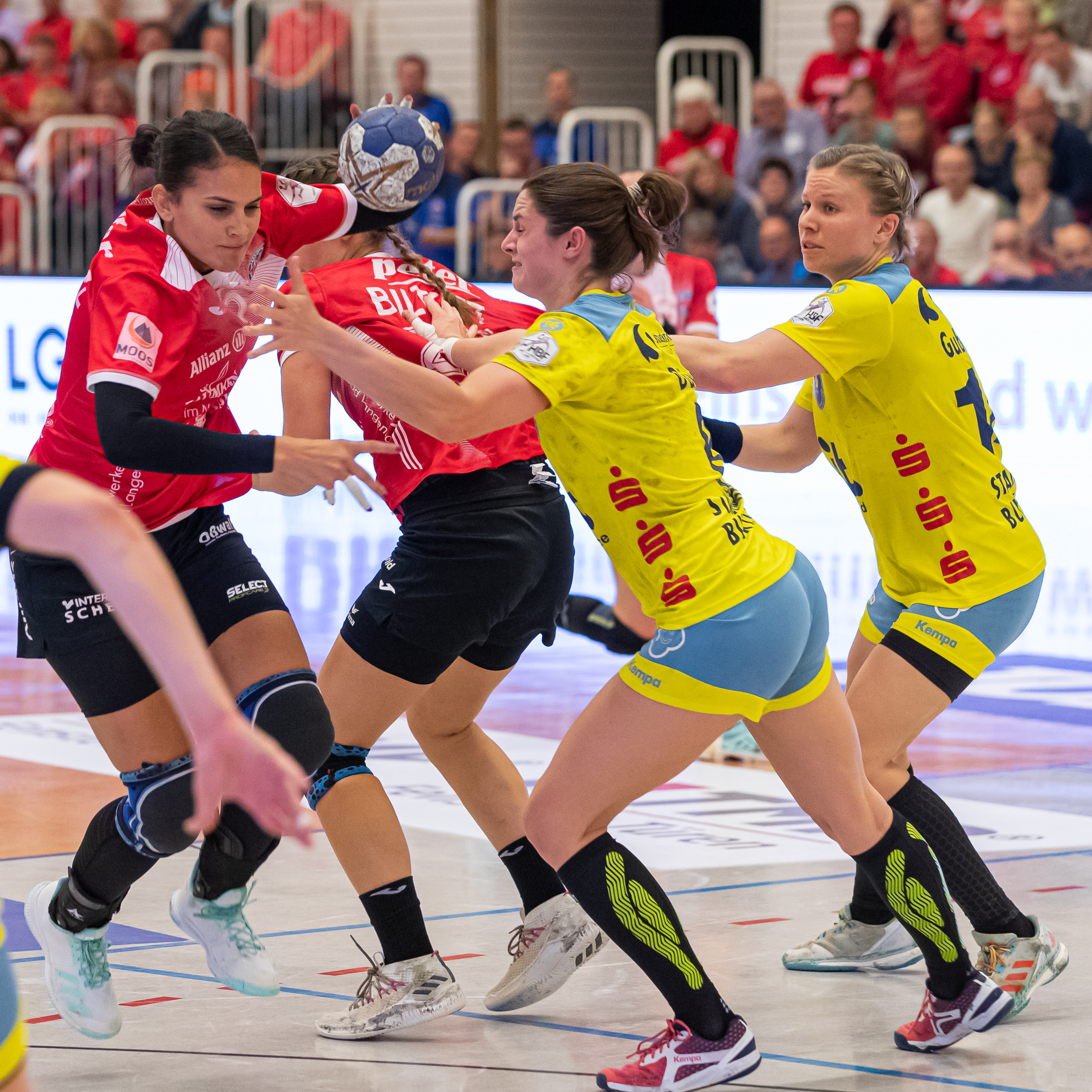

Personal information
- Full name: Almudena Rodríguez Rodríguez
- Nationality: Spanish
- Born: 9 November 1993 (age 32) Las Palmas, Spain
- Height: 1.75 m (5 ft 9 in)

Sport
- Sport: Handball
- Position: Right back
- Current club: Gloria Bistrița
- Number: 6

Senior clubs
- Years: Team
- 2013–2017: Rocasa Gran Canaria
- 2017–2019: Gloria Bistrița
- 2019–2020: Thüringer HC
- 2020–2022: Gloria Bistrița
- 2022–: Rocasa Gran Canaria
National team
Years	Team	Apps	(Gls)
2014–	Spain	106	(196)
Medal record
World Championship
Silver medal – second place	2019 Japan
Mediterranean Games
Gold medal – first place	2018 Tarragona	Team
- Updated on 16 September 2023

Almudena Rodríguez Rodríguez (born 9 November 1993) is a Spanish female handballer for Gloria Bistrița and the Spanish national team.

== Achievements ==
- EHF Challenge Cup:
  - Winner: 2016

== Individual awards ==
- Gala Premiilor Handbalului Românesc Liga Națională Right Back of the Season: 2019
