= Hellenic Handball Federation =

Handball governing body in Greece

Hellenic Handball Federation Greek: Ομοσπονδία Χειροσφαιρίσεως Ελλάδος OXE
- IOC nation: Hellenic Republic (GRE)
- Sport: Handball
- Other sports: Beach handball; Wheelchair handball
- Official website: www.handball.org.gr

HISTORY
- Year of formation: 1979; 47 years ago

AFFILIATIONS
- International federation: International Handball Federation (IHF)
- IHF member since: 1979
- Continental association: European Handball Federation
- National Olympic Committee: Hellenic Olympic Committee
- Other affiliation(s): Mediterranean Handball Confederation

GOVERNING BODY
- President: Konstantinos Gkantis

HEADQUARTERS
- Address: Athens
- Country: Greece
- Secretary General: Anastasios Cheividopoulos

The Hellenic Handball Federation (OXE) (Greek: Ομοσπονδία Χειροσφαιρίσεως Ελλάδος) is the governing body of handball and beach handball in Hellenic Republic (Greece). Founded in 1979, OXE is affiliated to the International Handball Federation and European Handball Federation. OXE is also affiliated to the Hellenic Olympic Committee and the Mediterranean Handball Confederation. It is based in Athens.

== OXE Competitions ==
- Greek Men's Handball Championship
- Greek Women's Handball Championship
- Greek Men's Handball Cup
- Greek Women's Handball Cup
- A2 Ethniki Handball

== National teams ==
- Greece men's national handball team
- Greece men's national junior handball team
- Greece men's national youth handball team
- Greece women's national handball team
- Greece women's national junior handball team
- Greece women's national youth handball team

== Competitions hosted ==
=== International ===
- 1991 Men's Junior World Handball Championship
- 2004 Summer Olympics
- 2011 Men's Junior World Handball Championship
- 2021 Men's Youth World Handball Championship (Future event)
