= María Núñez =

Spanish handball player (born 1988)

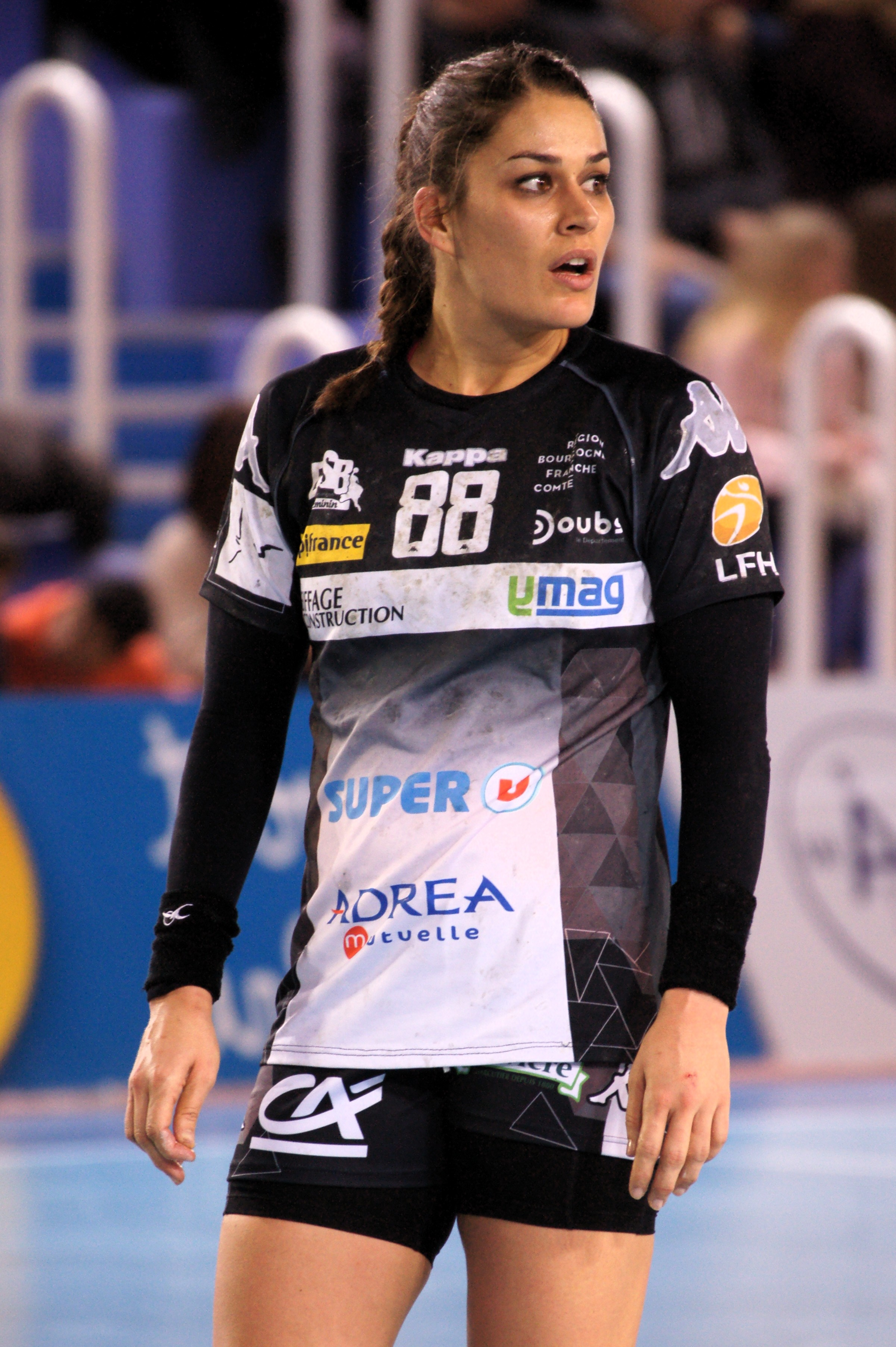

Personal information
- Full name: María Núñez Nistal
- Nationality: Spanish
- Born: 27 November 1988 (age 37) Mogán, Spain
- Height: 1.72 m (5 ft 8 in)

Sport
- Sport: Handball
- Position: Pivot
- Current club: ESBF Besançon
- Number: 88

Senior clubs
- Years: Team
- 2005–2006: BM Remudas
- 2006–2012: CB Mar Alicante
- 2012–2015: BM Bera Bera
- 2015–: ESBF Besançon
National team
| Years | Team | Apps | (Gls) |
| 2008– | Spain | 74 | (37) |
Medal record
World Championship
| Silver medal – second place | 2019 Japan |
European Championship
| Silver medal – second place | 2014 Croatia/Hungary |

María Núñez Nistal (born 27 November 1988) is a Spanish handball player for ESBF Besançon and the Spanish national team.

She represented Spain at the 2019 World Women's Handball Championship.
