= GAS Megas Alexandros Giannitson =

Greek handball club

GAS Megas Alexandros Giannitson (Greek: Μέγας Αλέξανδρος Γιαννιτσών) is a women's handball club from Giannitsa competing in the Greek women's handball championship. In 1987, it reached the final of the inaugural edition of the national cup, but lost to GE Veria. In 2008, the team made its international debut in the Challenge Cup and, in 2013, played in the EHF Cup for the first time.
