= Greek Women's Handball Cup =

Greek women's handball cup
- Countries: Greece
- Confederation: Hellenic Handball Federation
- Founded: 1987
- Domestic championship: Greek championship
- Current winner: PAOK (8)
- Most titles: Anagennisi Artas (10)

The Greek women's handball cup is an annual competition, the most important in Greek women's handball together with the Greek championship. The first winner was GE Veria in 1987. Anagennisi Artas holds the record of cups won with nine consecutive titles between 1998 and 2006. Ormi Patras was the team that put an end to that domination by winning the title on May 13, 2007.

== The Finals ==
Year	Location	Winner	Runner up	Score
1987	Neapoli, Thessaloniki	GE Veria	Megas Alexandros Giannitson	19–13
1988	Ilissia, Athens	Athinaikos	OF Neas Ionias	14–13
1989	Mets, Athens	GE Veria	Aris Nikaias	14–9
1990	Thessaloniki	GE Veria	Aris	23–15
1991	Thessaloniki	GE Veria	ASE Douka	22–19
1992	Thessaloniki	GE Veria	Anagennisi Artas	43–22
1993	Vyronas, Athens	GE Veria	Athinaikos	18–15
1994	Neapoli, Thessaloniki	ASE Douka	Ethnikos Kozanis	25–16
1995	Neapoli, Thessaloniki	Athinaikos	Anagennisi Artas	25–23
1996	Drama	GE Veria	Anagennisi Artas	33–29
1997	Ilisia, Athens	Athinaikos	Anagennisi Artas	28–27
1998	Korydallos	Anagennisi Artas	OF Neas Ionias	36–12
1999	Kozani	Anagennisi Artas	OF Neas Ionias	32–25
2000	Neapoli, Thessaloniki	Anagennisi Artas	Filippos Verias	33–26
2001	Patras	Anagennisi Artas	Ormi Patras	33–26
2002	Arta	Anagennisi Artas	Makedonikos	35–23
2003	Thessaloniki	Anagennisi Artas	Ormi Patras	31–21
2004	Patras	Anagennisi Artas	Ormi Patras	31–24
2005	Drama	Anagennisi Artas	Ormi Patras	33–32
2006	Amyntaio	Anagennisi Artas	Ormi Patras	33–26
2007	Veria	Ormi Patras	Anagennisi Artas	26–23
2008	Giannitsa	Anagennisi Artas	Ormi Patras	27–26
2009	Vyronas, Athens	Ormi Patras	OF Neas Ionias	30–20
2010	Arta	Ormi Patras	OF Neas Ionias	18–17
2011	Maroussi, Athens	OF Neas Ionias	Anagennisi Artas	26–23
2012	Loutraki	Ormi Patras	OF Neas Ionias	21–20
2013	Amyntaio	OF Neas Ionias	Anagennisi Artas	23–18
2014	Makrochori, Veria	PAOK	Anagennisi Artas	22–20
2015	Pylaia, Thessaloniki	OF Neas Ionias	PAOK	24–19
2016	Thessaloniki	PAOK	OF Neas Ionias	32–31
2017	Kamatero, Athens	OF Neas Ionias	Anagennisi Artas	37–17
2018	Kozani	OF Neas Ionias	PAOK	21–20
2019	Arta	PAOK	Anagennisi Artas	33–23
2020	Veria	PAOK	OF Neas Ionias	27–19
2021	Korydallos	PAOK	Veria 2017	26–24
2022	Chalkida	PAOK	OF Neas Ionias	21–20
2023	Igoumenitsa	OF Neas Ionias	PAOK	29–23
2024	Melissia, Athens	PAOK	OF Neas Ionias	26–22
2025	Thessaloniki	OF Neas Ionias	PAOK	22–19
2026	Arta	PAOK	Anagennisi Artas	26–18

== Titles by team ==
Team	Winners	Years won	Runners-up	Years runner-up
Anagennisi Artas	10	1998, 1999, 2000, 2001, 2002, 2003, 2004, 2005, 2006, 2008	11	1992, 1995, 1996, 1997, 2007, 2011, 2013, 2014, 2017, 2019, 2026
PAOK	8	2014, 2016, 2019, 2020, 2021, 2022, 2024, 2026	4	2015, 2018, 2023, 2025
OF Neas Ionias	7	2011, 2013, 2015, 2017, 2018, 2023, 2025	10	1988, 1998, 1999, 2009, 2010, 2012, 2016, 2020, 2022, 2024
GE Verias	7	1987, 1989, 1990, 1991, 1992, 1993, 1996	-	
Ormi Patras	4	2007, 2009, 2010, 2012	6	2001, 2003, 2004, 2005, 2006, 2008
Athinaikos	3	1988, 1995, 1997	1	1993
ASE Douka	1	1994	1	1991
Megas Alexandros Giannitson			1	1987
Aris Nikaias			1	1989
Aris			1	1990
Ethnikos Kozanis			1	1994
Filippos Verias			1	2000
Makedonikos			1	2002
Veria 2017			1	2021

- Thriamvos Patron took part in the 2001 final before merging with the 2 other clubs that created Ormi Patras.
