= Juve Lis =

Portuguese handball club

Juventude Desportiva do Lis (Portugal)
- Full name: Juventude Desportiva do Lis
- Nickname(s): Juve
- Short name: Juve Lis
- Founded: 1985
- Arena: Centro Desportivo Juve Lis, Leiria
- League: 2ª Divisão de Andebol Masculino
- Club colours
Home	Away

Juventude Desportiva do Lis, better known as Juve Lis, is a Portuguese handball from Leiria established in 1985. It is best known for its women's team, which made its international debut in 2003, in the Cup Winners' Cup. It subsequently made five appearances in the Challenge Cup between 2004 and 2012. In 2013 it made its debut in the EHF Cup.
