= KHF Prishtina =

- Full name: Klubi Hendbollistik; Prishtina
- Founded: 1957; 69 years ago
- Arena: Pallati I Sportit de Rinise
- League: SuperLiga e femrave e Kosoves

KHF Prishtina is a women's handball club from Pristina, Kosovo. KHF Prishtina competes in the SuperLiga e femrave e Kosoves and the Kosovo Handball Women's Cup.

== Titles ==
- Kosovar Handball Superliga
  - Winner (9) : 1973, 1983, 1987, 1997, 2010, 2011, 2012, 2016, 2017
- Kosovar Handball Cup
  - Winner (9) : 1995, 1997, 2004, 2008, 2009, 2011, 2012, 2016, 2017

== European record ==
Season	Competition	Round	Club	1st leg	2nd leg	Aggregate
2016–17	EHF Cup	R1	(Switzerland) SPONO Eagles	14–41	16–30	30–71

== Team ==
=== Current squad ===
Squad for the 2016–17 season

Goalkeepers

- (Kosovo) Njomeza Kelmendi
- (Kosovo) Agnesa Krasniqi

Wingers
RW

- (Kosovo) Rolanda Shala
- (Kosovo) Elmedina Zeqiri

LW

- (Kosovo) Era Alickaj
- (Kosovo) Qendresa Berisha
- (Kosovo) Florentina Prelvukaj

Line players

- (Kosovo) Emine Hoti
- (Kosovo) Dafina Rama
- (Kosovo) Luljeta Sopjani

Back players
LB

- (Kosovo) Isma Muqolli
- (Kosovo) Burneta Rama

CB

- (Kosovo) Pranvera Ferataj
- (Kosovo) Mimoza Sefedini

RB

- (Kosovo) Blede Krasniqi
- (Kosovo) Lena Mekolli
- (North Macedonia) Iva Stojkovska
