= Haradnichanka =

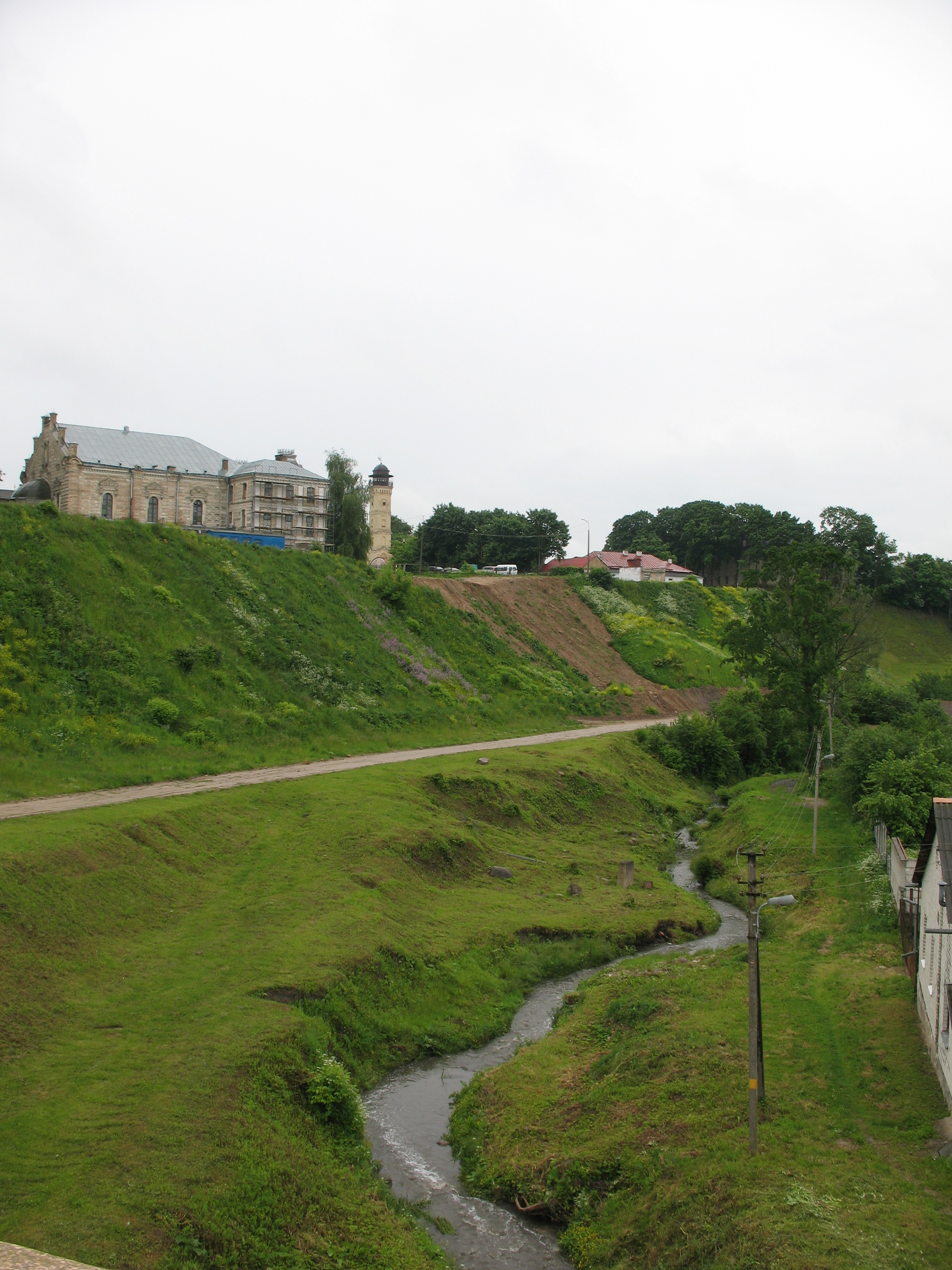

Location
- Country: Belarus

Physical characteristics
- Source
  - location: Belarus
- Mouth: Neman
  - coordinates: 53°40′39″N 23°49′14″E

Basin features
- Progression: Neman→ Baltic Sea
- Tributaries
  - right: Yurysdyka

The Haradnichanka, Haradnitsa (Belarusian: Гараднічанка, Гарадніца; Russian: Городничанка, Gorodnichanka; Lithuanian: Gardinėlė) is a river in Grodno and Grodno District, Belarus.

The headwaters of the Haradnichanka river are in the Kulbaki village to the north-east of Grodno.

The river has one tributary - the Yurysdyka stream.

The river roughly follows the edge of the glaciation during the last ice age.

The Haradnichanka river enters the Neman River from the right near the Orthodox church of Sts. Boris and Gleb Kolozha and the Old Grodno Castle.
