= Sanja Premović =

Montenegrin handball player (born 1992)

Personal information
- Nationality: Montenegrin
- Born: 27 November 1992 (age 33) Berane, Montenegro, FR Yugoslavia
- Height: 1.82 m (6 ft 0 in)

Sport
- Sport: Handball
- Position: Right back
- Current club: Konyaaltı Belediyesi SK
- Number: 27

Senior clubs
- Years: Team
- 2010–2011: Budućnost
- 2011–2013: HC Naisa Niš
- 2013–2014: Fredrikstad BK
- 2014–2016: Metraco Zaglebie Lubin
- 2016–2019: Budućnost
- 2019–2020: Kisvárdai KC
- 2020: Iuventa Michalovce
- 2020: HC Dunărea Brăila
- 2021–: Konyaaltı Belediyesi SK
National team
Years	Team	Apps	(Gls)
–	Montenegro	47	(17)
Medal record
Mediterranean Games
Silver medal – second place	2018 Tarragona	Team
Junior World Championship
Bronze medal – third place	2010 South Korea

Sanja Premović (born 27 November 1992) is a Montenegrin handballer for Konyaaltı Belediyesi SK and the Montenegrin national team.

== International honours ==
- EHF Champions League:
  - Semifinalist: 2011

She wins EHF European Cup in 2023 with Konyaaltı Belediyesi SK.
