= 2016–17 Women's EHF Cup =

European handball tournament

Women's EHF Cup
- 2016–17

Tournament information
- Sport: Handball
- Dates: 9 September 2016–13 May 2017
- Teams: 65

Final positions
- Champions: (Russia) Rostov-Don
- Runner-up: (Germany) SG BBM Bietigheim

Tournament statistics
- Matches played: 160
- Top scorer(s): (Germany) Susann Müller (77 Goals)

The 2016–17 Women's EHF Cup was the 36th edition of EHF's second-tier women's handball competition. It started on 9 September 2016.

== Overview ==
=== Team allocation ===
The labels in the parentheses show how each team qualified for the place of its starting round:

- TH: Title holders
- CWC: EHF Women's Cup Winners' Cup holders
- 1st, 2nd, 3rd, 4th, 5th, 6th, etc.: League position
- CW: Domestic cup winners
- CR: Domestic cup runners-up
- CL QT: Losers from the Champions League qualification stage.
- CL Group: Losers from the Champions League group stage.

Group stage
(Norway) Glassverket IF (4th CL Group A)	(Germany) HC Leipzig (4th CL Group B)	(Russia) Rostov-Don (4th CL Group C)	(Sweden) IK Sävehof (4th CL Group D)
Round 3
(Denmark) TTH Holstebro (CWC)	(Croatia) RK Podravka Koprivnica (2nd CL QT1)	(Austria) Hypo Niederösterreich (2nd CL QT2)	(Italy) Indeco Conversano (2nd CL QT3)
(Hungary) Dunaújvárosi KKA (TH)	(Turkey) Yenimahalle Bld. SK (3rd CL QT1)	(Spain) BM Bera Bera (3rd CL QT2)	(Poland) MKS Selgros Lublin (3rd CL QT3)
Round 2
(Denmark) Viborg HK (4th)	(Hungary) Debreceni VSC (4th)	(France) CJF Fleury LH (2nd)	(Belarus) HC Gomel (4th CL QT2)
(Denmark) Randers HK (5th)	(Russia) WHC Lada Togliatti (3rd)	(Romania) HCM Roman (CR)	(Slovakia) IUVENTA Michalovce (4th CL QT3)
(Hungary) Érd NK (3rd)	(Germany) TuS Metzingen (2nd)	(Netherlands) SERCODAK Dalfsen (4th CL QT1)	
Round 1
(Norway) Tertnes Bergen (CR)	(Germany) SG BBM Bietigheim (4th)	(Portugal) Alavarium/Love Tiles (2nd)	(Greece) OF Nea Ionia (1st)
(Norway) Byåsen HE (3rd)	(Germany) VfL Oldenburg (5th)	(Serbia) ŽRK Izvor Bukovička Banja (1st)	(Slovenia) RK Zagorje (1st)
(Norway) Vipers Kristiansand (4th)	(Sweden) Skuru IK (2nd)	(Serbia) ŽRK Naisa Niš (2nd)	(Luxembourg) HB Dudelange (1st)
(France) Brest BH (CW)	(Sweden) Lugi HF (3rd)	(Israel) Bnei Herzliya (1st)	(Kosovo) KHF Prishtina (1st)
(France) Issy Paris Hand (3rd)	(Poland) Pogoń Baltica Szczecin (2nd)	(Israel) HC Holon (CR)	(Lithuania) ACME-Žalgiris Kaunas (1st)
(France) Nantes LAH (5th)	(Poland) Vistal Gdynia (3rd)	(Denmark) Nykøbing Falster HK (6th)	(Faroe Islands) Neistin (1st)
(Romania) ASC Corona 2010 Brașov (3rd)	(Czech Republic) DHK Baník Most (1st)	(Hungary) Alba Fehérvár KC (6th)	(Bosnia and Herzegovina) HŽRK Grude (1st)
(Romania) HC Dunărea Brăila (4th)	(Czech Republic) DHC Slavia Prague (2nd)	(Italy) Cassano Magnago (2nd)	(Cyprus) AC Latsia Nicosia (1st)
(Romania) CSM Ploiești (6th)	(Switzerland) SPONO Eagles (1st)	(Netherlands) VOC Amsterdam (2nd)	(Ukraine) HC Galychanka (1st)
(Russia) HC Kuban Krasnodar (CR)	(Switzerland) LC Brühl Handball (2nd)	(Belarus) BNTU-BelAZ Minsk (2nd)	
(Russia) HK Dinamo Volgograd (4th)	(Portugal) Madeira Andebol SAD (1st)	(Turkey) Muratpaşa Belediyespor SK (2nd)	

=== Round and draw dates ===
All draws held at the European Handball Federation headquarters in Vienna, Austria.

Phase	Round	Draw date	First leg	Second leg
Qualifying	Qualification round 1	19 July 2016	10–11 September 2016	17–18 September 2016
Qualifying	Qualification round 2	19 July 2016	15–16 October 2016	22–23 October 2016
Qualifying	Qualification round 3	25 October 2016	12–13 November 2016	19–20 November 2016
Group stage	Matchday 1	24 November 2016	7–8 January 2017	
Group stage	Matchday 2	24 November 2016	14–15 January 2017	
Group stage	Matchday 3	24 November 2016	21–22 January 2017	
Group stage	Matchday 4	24 November 2016	28–29 January 2017	
Group stage	Matchday 5	24 November 2016	4–5 February 2017	
Group stage	Matchday 6	24 November 2016	11–12 February 2017	
Knockout stage	Quarterfinals	14 February 2017	4–5 March 2017	11–12 March 2017
Knockout stage	Semifinals	14 February 2017	8–9 April 2017	15–16 April 2017
Knockout stage	Final	18 April 2017	6–7 May 2017	13–14 May 2017

== Qualification stage ==
=== Round 1 ===
There is 42 teams participating in round 2.

Team 1	Agg.	Team 2	1st leg	2nd leg
VfL Oldenburg (Germany)	77–40	(Israel) Bnei Herzliya	41–20	36–20
Alba Fehérvár KC (Hungary)	55–34	(Poland) Vistal Gdynia	28–17	27–17
HB Dudelange (Luxembourg)	22–79	(Romania) HC Dunărea Brăila	12–43	10–36
Lugi HF (Sweden)	43–54	(Denmark) Nykøbing Falster HK	23–25	20–29
SPONO Eagles (Switzerland)	71–30	(Kosovo) KHF Prishtina	41–14	30–16
HK Dinamo Volgograd (Russia)	56–41	(Netherlands) SS/VOC Amsterdam	29–19	27–22
HC Holon (Israel)	37–74	(Norway) Tertnes Bergen	21–32	16–42
HŽRK Grude (Bosnia and Herzegovina)	33–83	(Romania) ASC Corona 2010 Brașov	16–43	17–40
Byåsen HE (Norway)	57–40	(Slovenia) RK Zagorje	32–20	25–20
Nantes LAH (France)	81–27	(Portugal) Alavarium/Love Tiles	47–16	34–11
DHK Baník Most (Czech Republic)	58–55	(Belarus) BNTU-BelAZ Minsk	28–23	30–32
Neistin (Faroe Islands)	44–57	(Romania) CSM Ploiești	24–26	20–31
ŽRK Naisa Niš (Serbia)	34–71	(Germany) SG BBM Bietigheim	15–34	19–37
HC Galychanka (Ukraine)	44–46	(Poland) Pogoń Baltica Szczecin	24–22	20–24
ŽRK Izvor Bukovička Banja (Serbia)	71–34	(Cyprus) AC Latsia Nicosia	38–14	33–20
HC Kuban Krasnodar (Russia)	67–48	(Greece) OF Nea Ionia	36–24	31–24
Issy Paris Hand (France)	59–43	(Switzerland) LC Brühl Handball	29–20	30–23
ACME-Žalgiris Kaunas (Lithuania)	51–55	(Turkey) Muratpaşa Belediyespor SK	27–30	24–25
Vipers Kristiansand (Norway)	89–22	(Italy) Cassano Magnago	52–10	37–12
Skuru IK (Sweden)	44–45	(Czech Republic) DHC Slavia Prague	26–22	18–23
Brest BH (France)	61–34	(Portugal) Madeira Andebol SAD	30–16	31–18

=== Round 2 ===
There is 32 teams participating in round 2.

21 teams who qualified from round 1 and 11 teams joining the draw.

Team 1	Agg.	Team 2	1st leg	2nd leg
HC Gomel (Belarus)	37–53	(Romania) HC Dunărea Brăila	15–27	22–26
HK Dinamo Volgograd (Russia)	51–60	(France) Brest BH	25–29	26–31
SG BBM Bietigheim (Germany)	60–43	(Romania) ASC Corona 2010 Brașov	37–24	23–19
Érd NK (Hungary)	59–52	(France) Issy Paris Hand	30–26	29–26
DHC Slavia Prague (Czech Republic)	45–65	(Denmark) Viborg HK	23–29	22–36
CSM Ploiești (Romania)	33–92	(Slovakia) IUVENTA Michalovce	19–43	14–49
ŽRK Izvor Bukovička Banja (Serbia)	54–59	(Netherlands) SERCODAK Dalfsen	26–34	28–25
Spono Eagles (Switzerland)	51–73	(Russia) HC Kuban Krasnodar	23–35	28–38
HCM Roman (Romania)	49–55	(Hungary) Alba Fehérvár KC	25–27	24–28
TuS Metzingen (Germany)	59–47	(Czech Republic) DHK Baník Most	30–22	29–25
Muratpaşa Belediyespor SK (Turkey)	33–56	(Denmark) Randers HK	20–30	13–26
VfL Oldenburg (Germany)	52–48	(France) CJF Fleury LH	29–22	23–26
Pogoń Baltica Szczecin (Poland)	57–68	(Denmark) Nykøbing Falster HK	29–35	28–33
Byåsen HE (Norway)	62–53	(Norway) Tertnes Bergen	33–27	29–26
WHC Lada Togliatti (Russia)	55–55	(Norway) Vipers Kristiansand	29–23	26–32
Nantes LAH (France)	52–49	(Hungary) Debreceni VSC	24–23	28–26

=== Round 3 ===
There is 24 teams participating in round 3.

16 teams who qualified from round 2 and 8 teams joining the draw.

Team 1	Agg.	Team 2	1st leg	2nd leg
Yenimahalle Bld. SK (Turkey)	56–63	(Germany) TuS Metzingen	33–27	23–36
Hypo Niederösterreich (Austria)	49–61	(Russia) HC Kuban Krasnodar	23–29	26–32
WHC Lada Togliatti (Russia)	57–48	(Denmark) Viborg HK	29–26	28–22
SERCODAK Dalfsen (Netherlands)	49–62	(France) Nantes LAH	21–31	28–31
TTH Holstebro (Denmark)	46–58	(Germany) VfL Oldenburg	25–27	21–31
IUVENTA Michalovce (Slovakia)	42–55	(Hungary) Alba Fehérvár KC	23–28	19–27
Randers HK (Denmark)	53–52	(Poland) MKS Selgros Lublin	28–27	25–25
Indeco Conversano (Italy)	46–72	(Denmark) Nykøbing Falster HK	24–36	22–36
HC Dunărea Brăila (Romania)	48–58	(Norway) Byåsen HE	25–24	23–34
RK Podravka Koprivnica (Croatia)	36–47	(Germany) SG BBM Bietigheim	16–23	20–24
Érd NK (Hungary)	60–47	(Hungary) Dunaújvárosi KKA	29–22	31–25
BM Bera Bera (Spain)	39–48	(France) Brest BH	20–25	19–23

== Group stage ==
There is 16 teams participating in the group phase.

12 teams who qualified from round 3 and 4 teams joining the draw.

=== Seedings ===
The seedings were announced on 21 November 2016

Teams in the draw will be protected against meeting teams from the same country in the same group.

Pot 1	Pot 2	Pot 3	Pot 4
(Germany) HC Leipzig (Norway) Glassverket IF (Russia) Rostov-Don (Sweden) IK Sävehof	(Denmark) Nykøbing Falster HK (Germany) SG BBM Bietigheim (Germany) VfL Oldenburg (Russia) HC Kuban Krasnodar	(Denmark) Randers HK (France) Brest BH (Germany) TuS Metzingen (Hungary) Érd NK	(France) Nantes LAH (Hungary) Alba Fehérvár KC (Norway) Byåsen HE (Russia) WHC Lada Togliatti

The first round of the group phase was scheduled for 7–8 January and the last round took place on 11–12 February.

Only the top two teams of each group made it to the quarter-finals.

=== Group A ===
Team	Pld	W	D	L	GF	GA	GD	Pts	NAN	RAN	SAV	OLD
(France) Nantes Handball	6	4	1	1	186	157	+29	9	—	25–19	34–30	28–29
(Denmark) Randers HK	6	4	1	1	153	144	+9	9	26–26	—	28–24	28–24
(Sweden) IK Sävehof	6	2	0	4	167	188	−21	4	23–36	21–27	—	37–33
(Germany) VfL Oldenburg	6	1	0	5	170	187	−17	2	30–37	24–25	30–32	—

=== Group B ===
Team	Pld	W	D	L	GF	GA	GD	Pts	KRA	BRE	FEH	LEI
(Russia) HC Kuban Krasnodar	6	5	0	1	173	148	+25	10	—	25–20	31–26	32–24
(France) Brest Bretagne	6	3	2	1	150	127	+23	8	27–21	—	21–21	23–20
(Hungary) Alba Fehérvár KC	6	2	2	2	159	156	+3	6	24–31	25–25	—	29–27
(Germany) HC Leipzig	6	0	0	6	134	185	−51	0	27–33	15–34	21–34	—

=== Group C ===
Team	Pld	W	D	L	GF	GA	GD	Pts	ROS	BIE	ERD	BYA
(Russia) Rostov-Don	6	5	0	1	173	137	+36	10	—	34–24	27–24	35–21
(Germany) SG BBM Bietigheim	6	3	0	3	166	173	−7	6	20–23	—	28–25	39–33
(Hungary) Érd NK	6	2	0	4	165	169	−4	4	19–30	35–27	—	34–22
(Norway) Byåsen HE	6	2	0	4	163	188	−25	4	29–24	23–28	35–28	—

=== Group D ===
Team	Pld	W	D	L	GF	GA	GD	Pts	NYF	MET	TOG	GLA
(Denmark) Nykøbing Falster HK	6	2	3	1	194	180	+14	7	—	36–36	35–23	32–32
(Germany) Tus Metzingen	6	3	1	2	176	153	+23	7	29–34	—	23–24	39–17
(Russia) HC Lada Togliatti	6	3	0	3	165	164	+1	6	35–32	26–27	—	32–21
(Norway) Glassverket IF	6	1	2	3	137	175	−38	4	25–25	16–22	26–25	—

== Knockout stage ==
=== Quarter-finals ===
Teams listed first played the first leg at home. Bolded teams qualified into semi-finals.

Team 1	Agg.	Team 2	1st leg	2nd leg
Randers HK (Denmark)	50–52	(Denmark) **Nykøbing Falster HK**	27–24	23–28
**SG BBM Bietigheim** (Germany)	59–57	(Russia) HC Kuban Krasnodar	33–26	26–31
Brest Bretagne (France)	40–54	(Russia) **Rostov-Don**	21–26	19–28
**TuS Metzingen** (Germany)	58–51	(France) Nantes Handball	27–23	31–28

=== Semi-finals ===
Team 1	Agg.	Team 2	1st leg	2nd leg
**SG BBM Bietigheim** (Germany)	66–59	(Denmark) Nykøbing Falster HK	38–27	28–32
TuS Metzingen (Germany)	39–60	(Russia) **Rostov-Don**	18–29	21–31

=== Final ===
Team 1	Agg.	Team 2	1st leg	2nd leg
SG BBM Bietigheim (Germany)	46–53	(Russia) **Rostov-Don**	25–28	21–25

== See also ==
- 2016–17 Women's EHF Champions League
- 2016–17 Women's EHF Challenge Cup
