= Vyronas =

Suburb of Athens, Greece

Vyronas Βύρωνας
- Municipality
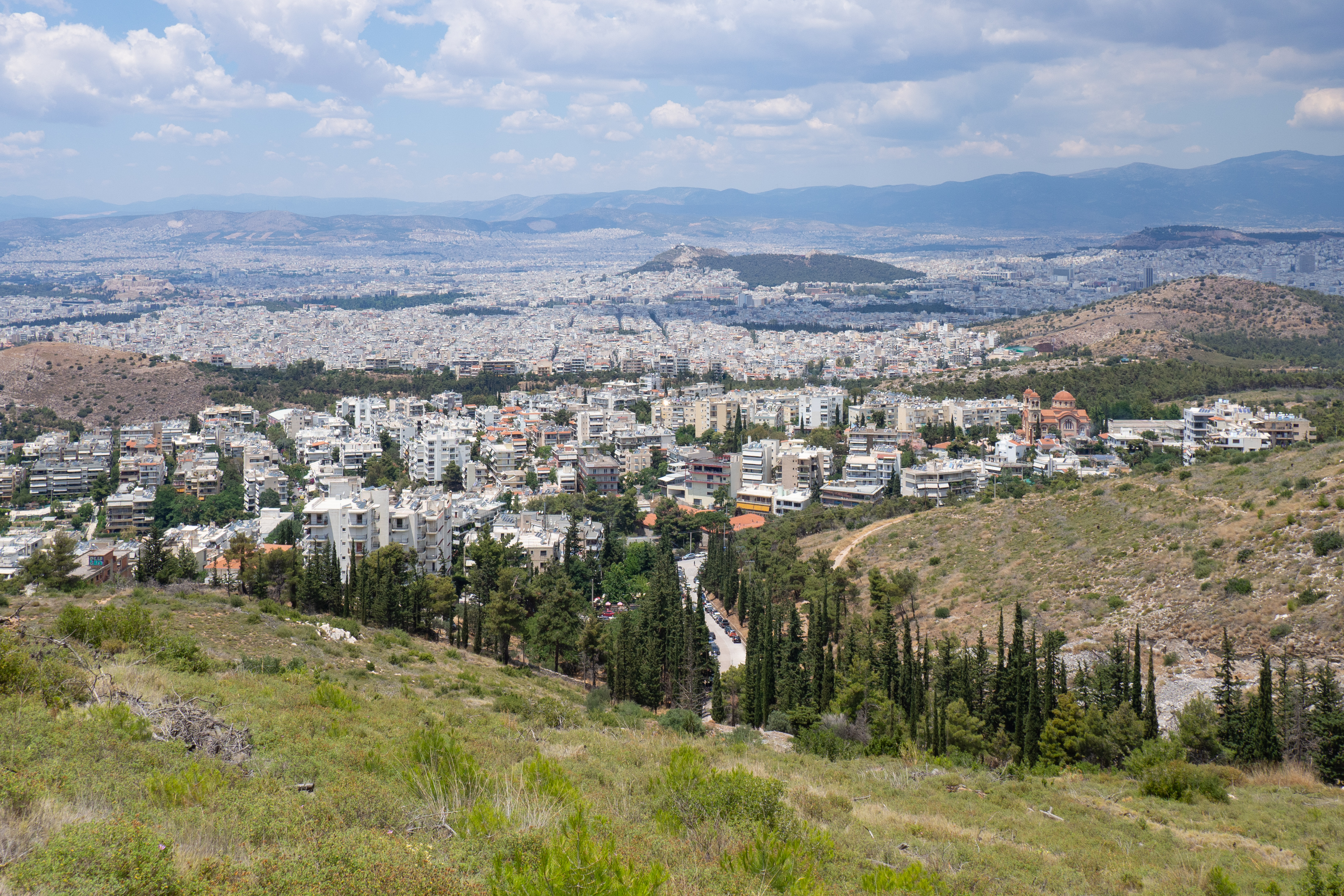
- View of Vyronas from Kareas

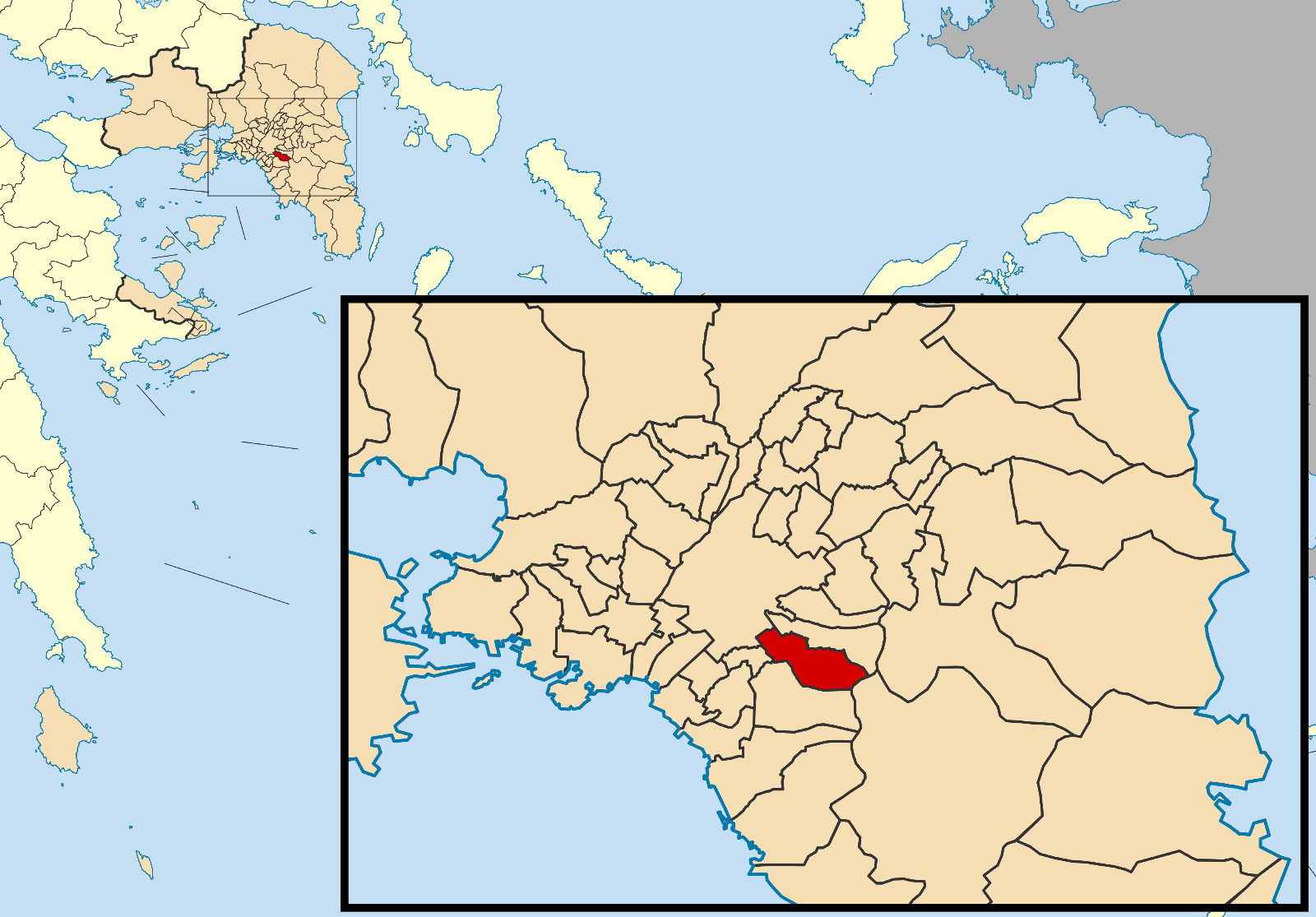

- Location within Greece
- Coordinates: 37°57.7′N 23°45.2′E
- Country: Greece
- Administrative region: Attica
- Regional unit: Central Athens

Area
  - Municipality: 9.204 km^{2} (3.554 sq mi)
- Elevation: 120 m (390 ft)

Population (2021)
  - Municipality: 59,134
  - Density: 6,425/km^{2} (16,640/sq mi)
- Time zone: UTC+2 (EET)
  - Summer (DST): UTC+3 (EEST)
- Postal code: 162 xx
- Area code: 210
- Vehicle registration: Z
- Website: www.dimosbyrona.gr

Vyronas (Greek: Βύρωνας) is a suburban town and a municipality in the southeastern part of the Athens agglomeration, Greece. The town is named after George Gordon Byron, 6th Baron Byron, the famous English poet and writer, who is a national hero of Greece. Formerly part of the municipality of Athens, Vyronas was created as a community in 1933, and became a municipality in 1934. The municipality has an area of 9.204 km^{2}.

Vyronas is an inner suburb of Athens, located about 3 km southeast of Athens city centre. Towards the southeast the municipality extends to the forested Hymettus mountain. The built-up area of Vyronas is continuous with that of municipality of Athens and the neighbouring suburbs Kaisariani, Ymittos and Ilioupoli. The A62 Hymettus Ring Road (formerly the A64 until 2024) runs through the southeastern part of the municipality, splitting it in half.

== Climate ==
Vyronas has a hot-summer Mediterranean climate (Köppen climate classification: Csa). Vyronas experiences cool, wet winters and hot, relatively dry summers.

Climate data for Vyronas
| Month | Jan | Feb | Mar | Apr | May | Jun | Jul | Aug | Sep | Oct | Nov | Dec | Year |
|---|---|---|---|---|---|---|---|---|---|---|---|---|---|
| Mean daily maximum °C (°F) | 12.32 (54.18) | 12.80 (55.04) | 15.28 (59.50) | 20.05 (68.09) | 25.89 (78.60) | 32.68 (90.82) | 32.51 (90.52) | 31.49 (88.68) | 29.22 (84.60) | 23.45 (74.21) | 17.61 (63.70) | 13.66 (56.59) | 22.25 (72.04) |
| Daily mean °C (°F) | 8.39 (47.10) | 8.80 (47.84) | 10.89 (51.60) | 15.15 (59.27) | 20.66 (69.19) | 25.89 (78.60) | 27.68 (81.82) | 27.34 (81.21) | 23.51 (74.32) | 18.48 (65.26) | 13.56 (56.41) | 10.52 (50.94) | 17.57 (63.63) |
| Mean daily minimum °C (°F) | 5.15 (41.27) | 5.31 (41.56) | 6.49 (43.68) | 9.50 (49.10) | 13.70 (56.66) | 18.25 (64.85) | 20.95 (69.71) | 20.71 (69.28) | 17.34 (63.21) | 12.95 (55.31) | 9.98 (49.96) | 7.01 (44.62) | 12.28 (54.10) |
| Average precipitation mm (inches) | 46.21 (1.82) | 45.21 (1.78) | 50.61 (1.99) | 34.01 (1.34) | 20.07 (0.79) | 9.25 (0.36) | 9.37 (0.37) | 10.02 (0.39) | 10.43 (0.41) | 42.29 (1.66) | 63.92 (2.52) | 65.40 (2.57) | 406.79 (16) |
| Mean monthly sunshine hours | 126.78 | 137.65 | 170.57 | 214.43 | 272.13 | 323.00 | 338.25 | 316.48 | 258.25 | 193.09 | 123.87 | 99.84 | 2,574.34 |
Source: Hellenic National Meteorological Service

== Sites of interest ==
- Vyronas National Stadium, which seats up to 4,340 and is 3 km from downtown Athens. It is home to the football club Athinaikos F.C. and their bitter rivals Doxa Vyronas F.C.
- Theatro Vrachon, where the Vyronas Festival takes place every summer
- Kareas Monastery, an orthodox monastery whose katholikon dates from the 11-12th century. It is located at the west slopes of Hymettus, near the site of an ancient quarry.
- The Dragon House of Hymettus, or Vyrona, is a rare megalithic structure located on Mount Hymettus. It is built with large stone blocks without mortar using a corbelled roofing technique. Its origin, date, and function remain uncertain, with theories suggesting it may have served as a sanctuary or shelter associated with nearby ancient quarries during antiquity.

== Schools ==
Schools include:

- Philippine School in Greece
- 4ο Γυμνάσιο Βύρωνα
- 3ο & 13ο Δημοτικά Vyronas

== Sports ==
Sport facilities in Vyronas are the Vyronas National Stadium (football stadium) and the Ergani Indoor Hall (gymnasium). Clubs based in Vyronas is Athinaikos, club with many achievements in several sports and Doxa Vyronas F.C.

Sport clubs based in Vyronas
| Club | Founded | Sports | Achievements |
|---|---|---|---|
| Athinaikos | 1917 | Football, Basketball, Handball | Panhellenic titles and European title in women basketball, titles in handball, earlier presence in A Ethniki in football |
| Doxa Vyronas F.C. | 1946 | Football | Earlier presence in Beta Ethniki |
| Anagennisi Vyrona | 1999 | Handball | Presence in A1 Ethniki handball |

== Historical population ==
| Year | Population |
|---|---|
| 1981 | 57,880 |
| 1991 | 58,523 |
| 2001 | 61,102 |
| 2011 | 61,308 |
| 2021 | 59,134 |

== See also ==
- List of municipalities of Attica
