= Mets, Athens =

Mets Μετς
- Neighborhood
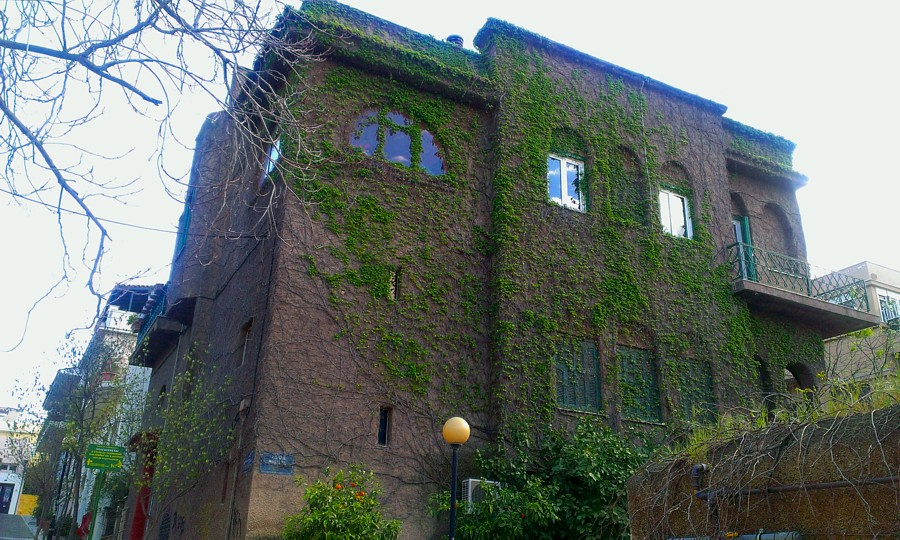
- Buildings in Mets

- Location within Athens
- Coordinates: 37°57′59″N 23°44′12″E
- Country: Greece
- Region: Attica
- City: Athens
- Postal code: 116 36
- Area code: 210
- Website: www.cityofathens.gr

Mets (Greek: Μετς) is a neighborhood of Athens, Greece. It is located between Ardettos Hill, First Cemetery of Athens and Temple of Olympian Zeus.

Mets owes its name to a beer brewery, opened by Bavarian brewer Karl Fuchs (the same man who founded Greek beer company Fix). Beer was, at the time, an unheard of beverage in Greece and was brought over due to the influence of Bavarian Greek king Otto of Greece.
