= Ormi Patras =

Greek handball club

- Founded: 2003
- Arena: Dimitris Tofalos Indoor Hall

Ormi Patras is a Greek women's handball club based in Patras. It was founded in 2003 through the fusion of Thriamvos Patras, Poseidonas Patras and Foinikas Patras. It is a major protagonist in the Greek women's handball cup and championship. Ormi Patras has won 6 Greek championships and 4 Greek cups. In 2015, Ormi Patras withdrew from the championship due to financial problems.

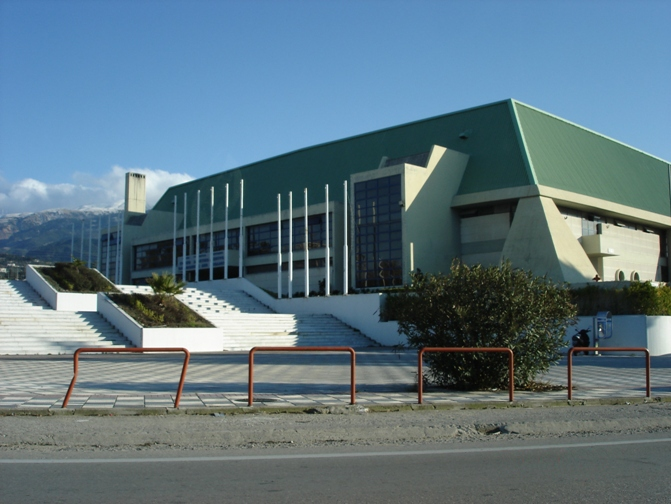
Dimitris Tofalos indoor hall

== Titles & honours ==
Women's handball

- National titles: 10
  - Greek Championship (6): 2007, 2008, 2009, 2010, 2011, 2012
  - Greek Cup (4): 2007, 2009, 2010, 2012
- Honours
  - Greek Championship runner up (4): 2004, 2006, 2013, 2015
  - Greek Cup runner up (5) : 2003, 2004, 2005, 2006, 2008

== Team's roster 2010-2011 ==
Anna Stratou, Eugenia Karagiorga, Athanasia Strataki, Irini Papazoglou, Olesia Semenchenko, Xristina Anthitsi, Edina Suto, Catalina Gheorghe, Rugile Niparaviciene, Jurate Zilinskaite

- President: Antonis Skiathas
- General Manager: Andreas Kogas
- Coach: Jani Ivan Cop
- Coach Assistant: Legouras Christos
