= Anagennisi Arta F.C. =

Anagennisi Arta
- Full name: Γυμναστικός Αθλητικός Σύλλογος Αναγέννηση Άρτας; Gumnastikos Athlitikos Syllogos Anagennisi Artas (Anagennisi Arta Football Club)
- Nickname: Mavri Thiella (Black Storm)
- Short name: ANA
- Founded: 1960; 66 years ago
- Ground: Arta Municipal Stadium
- Capacity: 1,961
- President: Vasilis Aspropotamitis
- Manager: Evangelos Stournaras
- League: Gamma Ethniki
- 2025–26: Gamma Ethniki (Group 3), 8th
- Website: anagennisiartasfc.gr
| Home colours | Away colours |

Anagennisi Arta Football Club (Greek: Γ.Α.Σ. Αναγέννηση Άρτας) is a Greek football club based in Arta, in northwestern Greece. It was founded in 1960 through the merger of three local clubs: Panamvrakikos (1926), Aetos (1949), and Olympiacos Arta (1951).

== History ==
=== Prior to the merger ===
The city's first team was A.O. Panamvrakikos (founded in 1926), which represented the departmental capital and the surrounding plain, wearing blue and white colors. During the 1930s, other teams in Arta included Keravnos and Panergatiki Enosi. In 1949, A.O. Aetos Artas was founded, wearing green and white colors, representing residents originating from the mountainous regions. Its founding was likely linked to the forced displacement of mountain populations to Arta due to the aftermath of the Greek Civil War. In 1950, A.O. Olympiacos Artas was established, representing the numerous supporters of Olympiacos in Arta.

=== The Merger ===
Arta was one of the first cities to merge its football clubs into a single, stronger team, well ahead of other football-prominent cities such as Kalamata, Serres, Larissa, and Ioannina. During the same period, other cities that underwent mergers alongside Arta included Trikala, Edessa, Veria, Katerini, Korinthos, and Livadeia. The idea for the merger emerged in 1958 and came to fruition after the sports department separated from the cultural association "Skoufas". In 1960, the three teams—A.O. Panamvrakikos, A.O. Aetos, and A.O. Olympiacos—formed G.A.S. Anagennisi Arta, choosing the iconic Bridge of Arta as its emblem and white (a common color among all three predecessor clubs) and black as its official colors.

== Honours ==
=== Domestic competitions ===
- Delta Ethniki
  - Champions (2): 1982–83, 1990–91
- Arta FCA Championship
  - Champions (5): 1999–2000, 2001–02, 2013–14, 2018–19, 2022–23
- Arta FCA Cup
  - Winners (13): 1993–94, 1998–99, 2001–02, 2002–03, 2003–04, 2009–10, 2012–13, 2019–20, 2021–22, 2022–23, 2023–24, 2024–25, 2025–26
- Epirus FCA Championship
  - Champions (3): 1963–64, 1968–69, 1975–76
- Epirus FCA Cup
  - Winners (2): 1975–76, 1977–78

== Supporters ==
The club's fans have traditionally lacked an officially organized supporters' group. Over the years, informal fan groups such as the "Black Cannibals" and "Black Knights" have formed, but none have gained official status.

== Crest and colours ==
The club's emblem features the historic Bridge of Arta, a well-known symbol of the city. The official club colours are black and white.

== See also ==
=== Handball ===
Anagennisi Arta is also widely recognized for its women's handball team, one of the most successful in Greece.

==== Women's team achievements ====
- Greek Women's Handball Championship
  - Champions (12): 1995, 1996, 1997, 1998, 1999, 2000, 2001, 2002, 2003, 2004, 2005, 2006
- Greek Women's Handball Cup
  - Winners (10): 1998, 1999, 2000, 2001, 2002, 2003, 2004, 2005, 2006, 2008

The men's handball team has had more modest success, competing primarily in the second division.
