= OF Nea Ionia =

Greek handball club

- Founded: 1926
- Team history: 1926-present
- Colours: cyan, white
- Club titles: 4 Women's Championships; 5 Women's Cups
- Website: http://www.ofni.org.gr/

OF Nea Ionia (Greek: Όμιλος Φιλάθλων Νέας Ιωνίας/ΟΦ Νέας Ιωνίας) is a Greek handball club, based in the suburban town of Nea Ionia in the Athens agglomeration. It was founded in 1926. The club dominates in women handball, winning most of the recent championships and cups. The team's colours are cyan and white.

== History ==
OF Nea Ionia was founded in 1926 by refugees from Asia Minor who had been settled in Nea Ionia. The club stopped its action its during Second World War and refounded in 1947. At those years the club had notable football team and other teams in various sports. The football team obligatorily merged with other local teams during Greek military junta. The women handball team, which is the most successful team of the club was founded in 1984. So far it won four championships and four cups. OF Nea Ionia won the champion and the cup's of season 2014-15. It is also won the championship of current season.

== Current squad ==
As of 31 May 2015

Number	Player	Position	Height (m)
1	Magdalini Kepesidou	Goalkeeper	1,78
2	Irene Manda	Pivot	1,70
6	Evgenia Diakogianni	Play Maker	1,70
7	Barbara Baouer	Right back	1,80
8	Fragkoula Papanikolaou	Right wing	1,80
9	Magda Papa	left back	1,77
10	Ariadni Masmanisou	Pivot	1,90
11	Panagiota Argyropoulou	left back	1,72
12	Roula Kotsabouikidou	Goalkeeper	1,78
14	Angeliki Gouzouli	Pivot	1,80
15	Agni Zigoura	Play Maker	1,79
16	Cassandra Kotohouridou	Goalkeeper	1,80
18	Athina Kostopoulou	Right back	1,78
19	Chrysoula Hronopoulou	Right back	1,82
21	Katerina Efkarpidou	Right wing	1,80
22	Lamprini Tsàkalou	Play Maker	1,75
25	Maria Chrysi	Play Maker	1,63
26	Marilena Rosu	left back	1,81
27	Rafailia Karaharisi	left back	1,72
28	Maria Smyrli	Right back	1,69
29	Menelia Kontostergiou	Left wing	1,63
29	Nefeli Staikoura	Right wing	1,69
99	Christa Stougiannidou	Right wing	1,67
	Coach: Sofia Naisidou		

== European record ==
Season	Competition	Round	Club	1st leg	2nd leg	Aggregate
2016–17	EHF Cup	R1	(Russia) HC Kuban Krasnodar	24–36	24–31	48–67

== Titles ==
- Greek Women's Handball Championship
  - Winner: 5 (2014, 2015, 2016, 2017, 2018)
- Greek Women's Handball Cup
  - Winner: 6 (2011, 2013, 2015, 2017, 2018, 2023)
