= Greek Women's Handball Championship =

A1 Ethniki Women's Handball
- Sport: Handball
- Founded: 1981
- No. of teams: 8
- Country: Greece
- Continent: (European Union) (Europe)
- Most recent champion: PAOK (7th title)
- Most titles: Anagennisi Arta (12 titles)
- Relegation to: A2 Ethniki
- Domestic cup: Greek Cup

The Greek women's handball championship known as A1 Ethniki Women's Handball is an annual competition, the most important in Greek women's handball together with the Greek Cup. The competition is organised by the Hellenic Handball Federation since 1981. The first champion was Aris Nikaias in 1982. Anagennisi Artas holds the record of most titles won with 12 consecutive titles from 1995 to 2006. Their dominance was ended by Ormi Patras in 2007. The current title holder is PAOK.

== List of champions ==
Panhellenic Championship
Season	Champion
1982	Aris Nikaias
1983	Aris Nikaias
1984	Aris Nikaias
1985	Aris Nikaias
1986	Athinaikos
1987	Athinaikos
1988	GE Veria
1989	GE Veria
1990	GE Veria
1991	GE Veria
1992	GE Veria
1993	GE Veria

A1 Ethniki
Season	Champion
1994	ASE Douka
1995	Anagennisi Arta
1996	Anagennisi Arta
1997	Anagennisi Arta
1998	Anagennisi Arta
1999	Anagennisi Arta
2000	Anagennisi Arta
2001	Anagennisi Arta
2002	Anagennisi Arta
2003	Anagennisi Arta
2004	Anagennisi Arta
2005	Anagennisi Arta

A1 Ethniki
Season	Champion
2006	Anagennisi Arta
2007	Ormi Patras
2008	Ormi Patras
2009	Ormi Patras
2010	Ormi Patras
2011	Ormi Patras
2012	Ormi Patras
2013	PAOK
2014	OF Nea Ionia
2015	OF Nea Ionia
2016	OF Nea Ionia
2017	OF Nea Ionia

A1 Ethniki
Season	Champion
2018	OF Nea Ionia
2019	PAOK
2020	PAOK
2021	PAOK
2022	PAOK
2023	PAOK
2024	OF Nea Ionia
2025	OF Nea Ionia
2026	PAOK

== Titles by team ==
Club	Titles	Seasons
Anagennisi Arta	12	1995, 1996, 1997, 1998, 1999, 2000, 2001, 2002, 2003, 2004, 2005, 2006
PAOK	7	2013, 2019, 2020, 2021, 2022, 2023, 2026
OF Nea Ionia	7	2014, 2015, 2016, 2017, 2018, 2024, 2025
GE Veria	6	1988, 1989, 1990, 1991, 1992, 1993
Ormi Patras	6	2007, 2008, 2009, 2010, 2011, 2012
Aris Nikaia	4	1982, 1983, 1984, 1985
Athinaikos	2	1986, 1987
ASE Douka	1	1994
