= List of Greek sports teams =

cities with title team

The most popular team sports in Greece are football, basketball, volleyball, water polo and handball. The first four sports have a big tradition in Greece as well as have taken place official championships since the decade of twenties or thirties. The official handball championship commenced with delay, in 1980, but won popularity gradually.

In all of these sports, at least a Greek team has played in a final of European competition. The Greek teams have won at least a cup in European competition in four of these sports (basketball, volleyball, waterpolo, handball).

The Greek Football Federation founded in 1926 and the first official men's Greek football championship took place in 1927-28 season. These season started also the men's official basketball championship and the official water polo championship. The first official men's Greek volleyball championship started in 1936. The first official handball championship in 1979-80 season, when the Greek Handball Federation founded.

The oldest women's championship is the basketball championship which started in 1967-68 season. The women's volleyball championship started in 1969-70 season, the women's water polo championship started in 1987-88 season, the handball women's started in 1981-82 season and the football in 1989-90 season.

The most titles in the men's sport have won Olympiacos Piraeus and the next most successful club is Panathinaikos. Only two teams have won a title in the four different sports. These are Olympiacos and Aris Thessaloniki.

== Men's competitions ==
=== Champions ===
Seasons	Football	Basketball	Volleyball	Water Polo	Handball
1927–28	Aris	Iraklis		Aris	
1928–29	not held	Panellinios		Aris	
1929–30	Panathinaikos	Aris		Aris	
1930–31	Olympiacos	not held		Ethnikos Piraeus	
1931–32	Aris	not held		Aris	
1932–33	Olympiacos	not held		Olympiacos	
1933–34	Olympiacos	not held		Olympiacos	
1934–35	not held	Iraklis		NO Patras	
1935–36	Olympiacos	Near East	Panellinios	Olympiacos	
1936–37	Olympiacos	Athens University	Panellinios	NO Patras	
1937–38	Olympiacos	not held	EA Patras	NO Patras	
1938–39	AEK Athens	Panellinios	Panellinios	NO Patras	
1939–40	AEK Athens	Panellinios	Panellinios	NO Patras	
1940–41	not finished	not held	not held	not held	
1941–42	not held	not held	not held	not held	
1942–43	not held	not held	not held	not held	
1943–44	not held	not held	Panellinios	not held	
1944–45	not held	not held	not held	NO Patras	
1945–46	Aris	Panathinaikos	not held	NO Patras	
1946–47	Olympiacos	Panathinaikos	not held	Olympiacos	
1947–48	Olympiacos	not held	not held	Ethnikos Piraeus	
1948–49	Panathinaikos	Olympiacos	not held	Olympiacos	
1949–50	not finished	Panathinaikos	not held	NO Patras	
1950–51	Olympiacos	Panathinaikos	not held	Olympiacos	
1951–52	not finished	not held	not held	Olympiacos	
1952–53	Panathinaikos	Panellinios	not held	Ethnikos Piraeus	
1953–54	Olympiacos	Panathinaikos	not held	Ethnikos Piraeus	
1954–55	Olympiacos	Panellinios	not held	Ethnikos Piraeus	
1955–56	Olympiacos	not held	not held	Ethnikos Piraeus	
1956–57	Olympiacos	Panellinios	not held	Ethnikos Piraeus	
1957–58	Olympiacos	AEK Athens	not held	Ethnikos Piraeus	
1958–59	Olympiacos	PAOK	not held	Ethnikos Piraeus	
1959–60	Panathinaikos	Olympiacos	Panathinaikos	Ethnikos Piraeus	
1960–61	Panathinaikos	Panathinaikos	Panellinios	Ethnikos Piraeus	
1961–62	Panathinaikos	Panathinaikos	Milon	Ethnikos Piraeus	
1962–63	AEK Athens	AEK Athens	Panathinaikos	Ethnikos Piraeus	
1963–64	Panathinaikos	AEK Athens	Milon	Ethnikos Piraeus	
1964–65	Panathinaikos	AEK Athens	Panathinaikos	Ethnikos Piraeus	
1965–66	Olympiacos	AEK Athens	Panathinaikos	Ethnikos Piraeus	
1966–67	Olympiacos	Panathinaikos	Panathinaikos	Ethnikos Piraeus	
1967–68	AEK Athens	AEK Athens	Olympiacos	Ethnikos Piraeus	
1968–69	Panathinaikos	Panathinaikos	Olympiacos	Ethnikos Piraeus Olympiacos	
1969–70	Panathinaikos	AEK Athens	Panathinaikos	Ethnikos Piraeus	
1970–71	AEK Athens	Panathinaikos	Panathinaikos	Olympiacos	
1971–72	Panathinaikos	Panathinaikos	Panathinaikos	Ethnikos Piraeus	
1972–73	Olympiacos	Panathinaikos	Panathinaikos	Ethnikos Piraeus	
1973–74	Olympiacos	Panathinaikos	Olympiacos	Ethnikos Piraeus	
1974–75	Olympiacos	Panathinaikos	Panathinaikos	Ethnikos Piraeus	
1975–76	PAOK	Olympiacos	Olympiacos	Ethnikos Piraeus	
1976–77	Panathinaikos	Panathinaikos	Panathinaikos	Ethnikos Piraeus	
1977–78	AEK Athens	Olympiacos	Olympiacos	Ethnikos Piraeus	
1978–79	AEK Athens	Aris	Olympiacos	Ethnikos Piraeus	
1979–80	Olympiacos	Panathinaikos	Olympiacos	Ethnikos Piraeus	Ionikos Nea Filadelphia
1980–81	Olympiacos	Panathinaikos	Olympiacos	Ethnikos Piraeus	Ionikos Nea Filadelphia
1981–82	Olympiacos	Panathinaikos	Panathinaikos	Ethnikos Piraeus	Ionikos Nea Filadelphia
1982–83	Olympiacos	Aris	Olympiacos	Ethnikos Piraeus	Ionikos Nea Filadelphia
1983–84	Panathinaikos	Panathinaikos	Panathinaikos	Ethnikos Piraeus	Ionikos Nea Filadelphia
1984–85	PAOK	Aris	Panathinaikos	Ethnikos Piraeus	Ionikos Nea Filadelphia
1985–86	Panathinaikos	Aris	Panathinaikos	Glyfada	Filippos Veria
1986–87	Olympiacos	Aris	Olympiacos	Glyfada	Ionikos Nea Filadelphia
1987–88	AEL	Aris	Olympiacos	Ethnikos Piraeus	Filippos Veria
1988–89	AEK Athens	Aris	Olympiacos	Glyfada	Filippos Veria
1989–90	Panathinaikos	Aris	Olympiacos	Glyfada	Filippos Veria
1990–91	Panathinaikos	Aris	Olympiacos	Vouliagmeni	Filippos Veria
1991–92	AEK Athens	PAOK	Olympiacos	Olympiacos	Ionikos Nea Filadelphia
1992–93	AEK Athens	Olympiacos	Olympiacos	Olympiacos	Ionikos Nea Filadelphia
1993–94	AEK Athens	Olympiacos	Olympiacos	Ethnikos Piraeus	Filippos Veria
1994–95	Panathinaikos	Olympiacos	Panathinaikos	Olympiacos	Filippos Veria
1995–96	Panathinaikos	Olympiacos	Panathinaikos	Olympiacos	ESN Vrilision
1996–97	Olympiacos	Olympiacos	Aris	Vouliagmeni	GE Veria
1997–98	Olympiacos	Panathinaikos	Olympiacos	Vouliagmeni	ASE Douka
1998–99	Olympiacos	Panathinaikos	Olympiacos	Olympiacos	Ionikos Nea Filadelphia
1999–00	Olympiacos	Panathinaikos	Olympiacos	Olympiacos	Panellinios
2000–01	Olympiacos	Panathinaikos	Olympiacos	Olympiacos	ASE Douka
2001–02	Olympiacos	AEK Athens	Iraklis	Olympiacos	Panellinios
2002–03	Olympiacos	Panathinaikos	Olympiacos	Olympiacos	Filippos Veria
2003–04	Panathinaikos	Panathinaikos	Panathinaikos	Olympiacos	Panellinios
2004–05	Olympiacos	Panathinaikos	Iraklis	Olympiacos	Athinaikos
2005–06	Olympiacos	Panathinaikos	Panathinaikos	Ethnikos Piraeus	Panellinios
2006–07	Olympiacos	Panathinaikos	Iraklis	Olympiacos	Panellinios
2007–08	Olympiacos	Panathinaikos	Iraklis	Olympiacos	ASE Douka
2008–09	Olympiacos	Panathinaikos	Olympiacos	Olympiacos	PAOK
2009–10	Panathinaikos	Panathinaikos	Olympiacos	Olympiacos	PAOK
2010–11	Olympiacos	Panathinaikos	Olympiacos	Olympiacos	AEK Athens
2011–12	Olympiacos	Olympiacos	Iraklis	Vouliagmeni	Diomidis Argous
2012–13	Olympiacos	Panathinaikos	Olympiacos	Olympiacos	AEK Athens
2013–14	Olympiacos	Panathinaikos	Olympiacos	Olympiacos	Diomidis Argous
2014–15	Olympiacos	Olympiacos	PAOK	Olympiacos	PAOK
2015–16	Olympiacos	Olympiacos	PAOK	Olympiacos	Filippos Veria
2016–17	Olympiacos	Panathinaikos	PAOK	Olympiacos	DIKE.AS.
2017–18	AEK Athens	Panathinaikos	Olympiacos	Olympiacos	Olympiacos
2018-19	PAOK	Panathinaikos	Olympiacos	Olympiacos	Olympiacos
2019-20	Olympiacos	Panathinaikos	Panathinaikos	Olympiacos	AEK Athens
2020–21	Olympiacos	Panathinaikos	Olympiacos	Olympiacos	AEK Athens
2021-22	Olympiacos	Olympiacos	Panathinaikos	Olympiacos	Olympiacos
2022-23	AEK Athens	Olympiacos	Olympiacos	Olympiacos	AEK Athens
2023-24	PAOK	Panathinaikos	Olympiacos	Olympiacos	Olympiacos
2024-25	Olympiacos	Olympiacos	Panathinaikos	Olympiacos	Olympiacos
2025-26	AEK Athens	Olympiacos	Panathinaikos	Olympiacos	Olympiacos

=== Cup's Winners ===
Season	Football	Basketball	Volleyball	Water Polo	Handball
1931–32	AEK Athens				
1932–33	Ethnikos Piraeus				
1933–34	not held				
1934–35	not held				
1935–36	not held				
1936–37	not held				
1937–38	not held				
1938–39	AEK Athens				
1939–40	Panathinaikos				
1940–41	not held				
1941–42	not held				
1942–43	not held				
1943–44	not held				
1944–45	not held				
1945–46	not held				
1946–47	Olympiacos				
1947–48	Panathinaikos				
1948–49	AEK Athens				
1949–50	AEK Athens				
1950–51	Olympiacos				
1951–52	Olympiacos				
1952–53	Olympiacos			Ethnikos Piraeus	
1953–54	Olympiacos			Ethnikos Piraeus	
1954–55	Panathinaikos			Ethnikos Piraeus	
1955–56	AEK Athens			Ethnikos Piraeus	
1956–57	Olympiacos			Ethnikos Piraeus	
1957–58	Olympiacos			Ethnikos Piraeus	
1958–59	Olympiacos			not held	
1959–60	Olympiacos			not held	
1960–61	Olympiacos			not held	
1961–62	no awarded			not held	
1962–63	Olympiacos			not held	
1963–64	AEK Athens			not held	
1964–65	Olympiacos			not held	
1965–66	AEK Athens			not held	
1966–67	Panathinaikos			not held	
1967–68	Olympiacos			not held	
1968–69	Panathinaikos			not held	
1969–70	Aris			not held	
1970–71	Olympiacos			not held	
1971–72	PAOK			not held	
1972–73	Olympiacos			not held	
1973–74	PAOK			not held	
1974–75	Olympiacos			not held	
1975–76	Iraklis	Olympiacos		not held	
1976–77	Panathinaikos	Olympiacos		not held	
1977–78	AEK Athens	Olympiacos		not held	
1978–79	Panionios	Panathinaikos		not held	
1979–80	Kastoria	Olympiacos		not held	
1980–81	Olympiacos	AEK Athens	Olympiacos	not held	
1981–82	Panathinaikos	Panathinaikos	Panathinaikos	not held	
1982–83	AEK Athens	Panathinaikos	Olympiacos	not held	V.A.O.
1983–84	Panathinaikos	PAOK	Panathinaikos	Ethnikos Piraeus	V.A.O.
1984–85	AEL	Aris	Panathinaikos	Ethnikos Piraeus	Filippos Veria
1985–86	Panathinaikos	Panathinaikos	not held	Glyfada	Ionikos Nea Filadelphia
1986–87	OFI	Aris	not held	Glyfada	Ionikos Nea Filadelphia
1987–88	Panathinaikos	Aris	not held	Ethnikos Piraeus	Ionikos Nea Filadelphia
1988–89	Panathinaikos	Aris	Olympiacos	Glyfada	Ionikos Nea Filadelphia
1989–90	Olympiacos	Aris	Olympiacos	NO Chios	Archelaos Katerinis
1990–91	Panathinaikos	Panionios	not held	Ethnikos Piraeus	Filippos Veria
1991–92	Olympiacos	Aris	Olympiacos	Olympiacos	Filippos Veria
1992–93	Panathinaikos	Panathinaikos	Olympiacos	Olympiacos	Ionikos Nea Filadelphia
1993–94	Panathinaikos	Olympiacos	not held	not held	Archelaos Katerinis
1994–95	Panathinaikos	PAOK	not held	NO Patras	AS Xini
1995–96	AEK Athens	Panathinaikos	not held	Vouliagmeni	ESN Vrilissia
1996–97	AEK Athens	Olympiacos	Olympiacos	Olympiacos	Athinaikos
1997–98	Panionios	Aris	Olympiacos	Olympiacos	ASE Douka
1998–99	Olympiacos	PAOK	Olympiacos	Vouliagmeni	ASE Douka
1999–00	AEK Athens	AEK Athens	Iraklis	Ethnikos Piraeus	Panellinios
2000–01	PAOK	AEK Athens	Olympiacos	Olympiacos	Panellinios
2001–02	AEK Athens	Olympiacos	Iraklis	Olympiacos	Panellinios
2002–03	PAOK	Panathinaikos	AE Nikaia	Olympiacos	Filippos Veria
2003–04	Panathinaikos	Aris	Iraklis	Olympiacos	GAS Kilkis
2004–05	Olympiacos	Panathinaikos	Iraklis	Ethnikos Piraeus	Athinaikos
2005–06	Olympiacos	Panathinaikos	Iraklis	Olympiacos	Athinaikos
2006–07	AEL	Panathinaikos	Panathinaikos	Olympiacos	Filippos Veria
2007–08	Olympiacos	Panathinaikos	Panathinaikos	Olympiacos	ASE Douka
2008–09	Olympiacos	Panathinaikos	Olympiacos	Olympiacos	AEK Athens
2009–10	Panathinaikos	Olympiacos	Panathinaikos	Olympiacos	ASE Douka
2010–11	AEK Athens	Olympiacos	Olympiacos	Olympiacos	ESN Vrilissia
2011–12	Olympiacos	Panathinaikos	Iraklis	Vouliagmeni	PAOK
2012–13	Olympiacos	Panathinaikos	Olympiacos	Olympiacos	AEK Athens
2013–14	Panathinaikos	Panathinaikos	Olympiacos	Olympiacos	AEK Athens
2014–15	Olympiacos	Panathinaikos	PAOK	Olympiacos	PAOK
2015–16	AEK Athens	Panathinaikos	Olympiacos	Olympiacos	Filippos Veria
2016–17	PAOK	Panathinaikos	Olympiacos	Vouliagmeni	PAOK
2017–18	PAOK	AEK Athens	PAOK	Olympiacos	Olympiacos
2018-19	PAOK	Panathinaikos	PAOK	Olympiacos	Olympiacos
2019-20	Olympiacos	AEK Athens	cancelled	Olympiacos	cancelled
2020-21	PAOK	Panathinaikos	cancelled	Olympiacos	AEK Athens
2021-22	Panathinaikos	Olympiacos	PAOK	Olympiacos	AESH Pylaia
2022-23	AEK Athens	Olympiacos	PAOK	Olympiacos	Olympiacos
2023-24	Panathinaikos	Olympiacos	Olympiacos	Olympiacos	PAOK
2024-25	Olympiacos	Panathinaikos	Olympiacos	Olympiacos	AEK Athens
2025-26	OFI	Panathinaikos	Panathinaikos	Olympiacos	Olympiacos

=== League Cup's Winners ===
Season	Football	Basketball	Volleyball	Water Polo	Handball
1989–90	AEK Athens				
1991-2011	not held				
2011-12	not held		Foinikas Syros		
2012-13	not held		Olympiacos		
2013-14	not held		AEK Athens		
2014-15	not held		Olympiacos		
2015-16	not held		Olympiacos		
2016-17	not held		Olympiacos		
2017-18	not held		Olympiacos		
2018-19	not held		Olympiacos		
2019-20	not held		Panathinaikos		
2020-21	not held		Foinikas Syros		
2021-22	not held		Panathinaikos		
2022-23	not held		Panathinaikos		
2023-24	not held		Panathinaikos		
2024-25	not held		Olympiacos		
2025-26	not held		Olympiacos		

=== Super Cup's Winners ===
Year	Football	Basketball	Volleyball	Water Polo	Handball
1986	not held	Aris			
1987	Olympiacos				
1988	Panathinaikos				
1989	AEK Athens				
1990	not held				
1991	not held				
1992	Olympiacos				
1993	Panathinaikos				
1994	Panathinaikos				
1995	not held				
1996	AEK Athens			Vouliagmeni	
1997	not held		Aris	Olympiacos	
1998	not held		not held	Olympiacos	
1999	not held		not held	not held	Ionikos NF
2000	not held		Olympiacos	not held	not held
2001	not held		not held	not held	not held
2002	not held		not held	not held	not held
2003	not held		not held	not held	not held
2004	not held		Iraklis	not held	not held
2005	not held		Iraklis	not held	not held
2006	not held		Panathinaikos	not held	not held
2007	Olympiacos		Iraklis	not held	not held
2008	not held		Iraklis	not held	not held
2009	not held		not held	not held	not held
2010	not held		Olympiacos	not held	not held
2011	not held		not held	not held	not held
2012	not held		not held	not held	not held
2013	not held		not held	not held	not held
2014	not held		not held	not held	not held
2015	not held		not held	not held	not held
2016	not held		not held	not held	not held
2017	not held		not held	not held	not held
2018	not held		not held	Olympiacos	not held
2019	not held		not held	Olympiacos	not held
2020	not held	Promitheas	not held	Olympiacos	not held
2021	not held	Panathinaikos	Foinikas Syros	not held	not held
2022	not held	Olympiakos	Panathinaikos	not held	Olympiacos
2023	not held	Olympiakos	PAOK	not held	Olympiacos
2024	not held	Olympiakos	Olympiacos	not held	Olympiacos
2025	Olympiacos	Olympiakos	Olympiacos	not held	Olympiacos

== Women's competitions ==
=== Champions ===
Season	Basketball	Volleyball	Water Polo	Handball	Football
1967–68	Iraklis				
1968–69	Piraikos Syndesmos				
1969–70	Piraikos Syndesmos				
1970–71	Iraklis	Panathinaikos			
1971–72	Iraklis	Panathinaikos			
1972–73	Athens College	Panathinaikos			
1973–74	Apollon Kalamarias	ZAON Kifissia			
1974–75	Paleo Faliro B.C.	ZAON Kifissia			
1975–76	Sporting	ZAON Kifissia			
1976–77	Sporting	Panathinaikos			
1977–78	Olympiacos Volos	Panathinaikos			
1978–79	Sporting	Panathinaikos			
1979–80	Sporting	ZAON Kifissia			
1980–81	Sporting	ZAON Kifissia			
1981–82	Paleo Faliro B.C.	Panathinaikos		Aris Nikaia	
1982–83	Sporting	Panathinaikos		Aris Nikaia	
1983–84	Sporting	Filathlitikos Thessaloniki		Aris Nikaia	
1984–85	Sporting	Panathinaikos		Aris Nikaia	
1985–86	Sporting	Filathlitikos Thessaloniki		Athinaikos	
1986–87	Sporting	Filathlitikos Thessaloniki		Athinaikos	
1987–88	Sporting	Panathinaikos	Ethnikos Piraeus	GE Veria	
1988–89	Sporting	Ionikos Nea Filadelfeia	ANO Glyfada	GE Veria	
1989–90	Sporting	Panathinaikos	Ethnikos Piraeus	GE Veria	Olympiada Thessaloniki
1990–91	Sporting	Panathinaikos	Vouliagmeni	GE Veria	Doxa Piraeus
1991–92	Apollon Kalamarias	Panathinaikos	Ethnikos Piraeus	GE Veria	Doxa Piraeus
1992–93	Sporting	Panathinaikos	Vouliagmeni	GE Veria	Kavala 86'
1993–94	Sporting	Ionikos Nea Filadelfeia	Vouliagmeni	ASE Douka	Doxa Piraeus
1994–95	Sporting	FO Vrilissia	Olympiacos	Anagennisi Arta	Doxa Piraeus
1995–96	Sporting	FO Vrilissia	ANO Glyfada	Anagennisi Arta	Olympiada Thessaloniki
1996–97	Sporting	FO Vrilissia	Vouliagmeni	Anagennisi Arta	Ilioupoli Thessaloniki
1997–98	Panathinaikos	Panathinaikos	Olympiacos	Anagennisi Arta	Olympiada Thessaloniki
1998–99	Sporting	FO Vrilissia	ANO Glyfada	Anagennisi Arta	Union Doxa/Artemis Piraeus
1999–00	Panathinaikos	Panathinaikos	ANO Glyfada	Anagennisi Arta	Filiriakos Florina
2000–01	DAS Ano Liosia	Panellinios	ANO Glyfada	Anagennisi Arta	Kavala 86'
2001–02	DAS Ano Liosia	Panellinios	ANO Glyfada	Anagennisi Arta	PAOK
2002–03	DAS Ano Liosia	Filathlitikos Thessaloniki	Vouliagmeni	Anagennisi Arta	AE Aegina
2003–04	Sporting	FO Vrilissia	ANO Glyfada	Anagennisi Arta	AE Aegina
2004–05	Panathinaikos	Panathinaikos	Vouliagmeni	Anagennisi Arta	AE Aegina
2005–06	AE Esperides Kallithea	Panathinaikos	Vouliagmeni	Anagennisi Arta	PAOK
2006–07	Panionios	Panathinaikos	Vouliagmeni	Ormi Patra	PAOK
2007–08	AE Esperides Kallithea	Panathinaikos	ANO Glyfada	Ormi Patra	PAOK
2008–09	Athinaikos	Panathinaikos	Olympiacos	Ormi Patra	PAOK
2009–10	Athinaikos	Panathinaikos	Vouliagmeni	Ormi Patra	PAOK
2010–11	Athinaikos	Panathinaikos	Olympiacos	Ormi Patra	PAOK
2011–12	Athinaikos	AEK Athens	Vouliagmeni	Ormi Patra	PAOK
2012–13	Panathinaikos	Olympiacos	Vouliagmeni	PAOK	PAOK
2013–14	Elliniko-Sourmena	Olympiacos	Olympiacos	OF Nea Ionia	Amazones Dramas
2014–15	Elliniko-Sourmena	Olympiacos	Olympiacos	OF Nea Ionia	PAOK
2015–16	Olympiacos	Olympiacos	Olympiacos	OF Nea Ionia	PAOK
2017–18	Olympiacos	Olympiacos	Olympiacos	OF Nea Ionia	PAOK
2017–18	Olympiacos	Olympiacos	Olympiacos	OF Nea Ionia	PAOK
2018–19	Olympiacos	Olympiacos	Olympiacos	PAOK	PAOK
2019–20	Olympiacos	Olympiacos	Olympiacos	PAOK	PAOK
2020-21	Panathinaikos	cancelled	Olympiacos	PAOK	PAOK
2021-22	Olympiacos	Panathinaikos	Olympiacos	PAOK	PAOK
2022-23	Olympiacos	Panathinaikos	Olympiacos	PAOK	PAOK
2023-24	Olympiacos	Panathinaikos	Olympiacos	OF Nea Ionia	PAOK
2024-25	Olympiacos	Olympiacos	Vouliagmeni	OF Nea Ionia	AEK
2025-26	Athinaikos	Panathinaikos	Olympiacos	PAOK	PAOK

=== Cup's winners ===
Season	Basketball	Volleyball	Water polo	Handball	Football
1986–87				GE Veria	
1987–88				Athinaikos	
1988–89				GE Veria	
1989–90				GE Veria	
1990–91				GE Veria	
1991–92				GE Veria	
1992–93				GE Veria	
1993–94				ASE Douka	
1994–95				Athinaikos	
1995–96	Sporting			GE Veria	
1996–97	Apollon Kalamarias			Athinaikos	
1997–98	Thriamvos Athens			Anagennisi Arta	
1998–99	Sporting	FO Vrilisia		Anagennisi Arta	
1999–00	Panathinaikos	FO Vrilisia		Anagennisi Arta	Olympiada Thessaloniki
2000–01	DAS Ano Liosia	Panellinios		Anagennisi Arta	Kavala 86'
2001–02	ANO Glyfada	ZAON Kifissia		Anagennisi Arta	PAOK
2002–03	ANO Glyfada	FO Vrilisia		Anagennisi Arta	not held
2003–04	DAS Ano Liosia	FO Vrilisia		Anagennisi Arta	not held
2004–05	Sporting	Panathinaikos		Anagennisi Arta	not held
2005–06	AE Esperides Kallithea	Panathinaikos		Anagennisi Arta	not held
2006–07	AE Esperides Kallithea	interrupted		Ormi Patra	not held
2007–08	AE Esperides Kallithea	Panathinaikos		Anagennisi Arta	not held
2008–09	AE Esperides Kallithea	Panathinaikos		Ormi Patra	not held
2009–10	Athinaikos	Panathinaikos		Ormi Patra	not held
2010–11	Athinaikos	Olympiacos		OF Nea Ionia	not held
2011–12	Athinaikos	Olympiacos		Ormi Patra	not held
2012–13	Proteas Voulas	Olympiacos		OF Nea Ionia	PAOK
2013–14	Elliniko-Sourmena	Olympiacos		PAOK	PAOK
2014–15	Elliniko-Sourmena	Olympiacos		OF Nea Ionia	PAOK
2015–16	Olympiacos	Olympiacos		PAOK	PAOK
2016–17	Olympiacos	Olympiacos		OF Nea Ionia	PAOK
2017–18	Olympiacos	Olympiacos	Olympiacos	OF Nea Ionia	not held
2018–19	Olympiacos	Olympiacos	Vouliagmeni	PAOK	not held
2019–20	cancelled	cancelled	Olympiacos	PAOK	not held
2020–21	cancelled	PAOK	Olympiacos	PAOK	not held
2021–22	Olympiacos	Panathinaikos	Olympiacos	PAOK	not held
2022–23	Panathinaikos	AEK	Olympiacos	OF Nea Ionia	not held
2023–24	Panathinaikos	Olympiacos	Ethnikos Piraeus	PAOK	PAOK
2024–25	Olympiacos	Olympiacos	Olympiacos	OF Nea Ionia	AEK
2025–26	Athinaikos	Panionios	Olympiacos	PAOK	PAOK

=== Super Cup's Winners ===
Year	Basketball	Volleyball	Water Polo	Handball	Football
2012		AEK Athens			
2013-2022		not held			
2023		not held		PAOK	
2024		Olympiacos		OF Nea Ionia	
2025		Panionios		OF Nea Ionia	
