= 2015–16 Greek Handball Premier =

Handball Premier
- Season: 2015–16
- Champions: Filippos Veria; 9th
- Relegated: Archelaos
- Matches played: 142
- Goals scored: 7,216 (50.82 per match)
- Top goalscorer: (Greece) Christoforos Bakaoukas (146 goals)

The 2015–16 Greek Handball Premier is the 37th season of the Greek Handball Premier.

== Teams ==
Location of teams in Greek Handball Championship 2015–16

The clubs for the 2015–16 season:

Club	Home city
AEK	Athens
Aeropos Edessas	Edessa
Archelaos Katerinis	Katerini
ASE Douka	Maroussi, Athens
DIKEAS Nea Ionia	Nea Ionia, Athens
Diomidis Argous	Argos
Filippos Veria	Veria
Panellinios	Athens
PAOK	Thessaloniki
Foivos Sykeon	Sykies, Thessaloniki
Poseidon Loutrakiou	Loutraki
YMCA Thessaloniki	Thessaloniki

== Regular season ==
Championship Round
Relegation Round

	Team	Pld	W	D	L	GF	GA	Diff	Pts
1	Diomidis Argous	22	20	0	2	626	431	+195	40
2	Filippos Veria	22	17	1	4	658	544	+114	35
3	PAOK	22	15	1	6	625	560	+65	31
4	DIKEAS Nea Ionia	22	13	2	7	579	508	+71	28
5	Poseidon Loutrakiou	22	11	2	9	548	510	+38	24
6	ASE Douka	22	10	2	10	511	521	−10	22
7	Aeropos Edessas	22	8	4	10	591	586	+5	20
8	AEK Athens	22	8	3	11	596	588	+8	19
9	Panellinios	22	8	2	12	517	547	−30	18
10	Foivos Sykeon	22	7	1	14	532	606	−74	15
11	YMCA Thessaloniki	22	6	0	16	483	579	−96	12
12	Archelaos Katerinis	22	0	0	22	455	741	−286	–1

Pld – Played; W – Won; D – Drawn; L – Lost; GF – Goals for; GA – Goals against; Diff – Difference; Pts – Points.

== Second round ==
In the second round, the teams were divided into two groups of six (based on their regular season standings) and competed for places 1 to 6 in the first group, and for places 7 to 12 in the second.

Teams started the second round with their regular season points halved (and rounded up) and faced each other once.

In the 1–6 group, the teams started with the following points: Diomidis 20 points, Filippos 18, PAOK 16, DIKEAS Nea Ionia 14, Poseidon Loutrakiou 12, ASE Douka 11.

In the 7–12 group, the teams started with the following points: Aeropos Edessas 10, AEK 10, Panellinios 9, Foivos Sykeon 8, YMCA Thessaloniki 6, Archelaos Katerinis 0.

=== Standings ===
Qualified to the Finals
Relegated to 2016–17 A2 Ethniki

	Team	Pld	W	D	L	GF	GA	Diff	Pts
1	Diomidis Argous	5	4	1	0	138	116	+22	29
2	Filippos Veria	5	3	0	2	127	118	+9	24
3	PAOK	5	3	0	2	133	113	+20	22
4	DIKEAS Nea Ionia	5	2	1	2	137	132	+5	19
5	Poseidon Loutrakiou	5	0	2	3	131	145	−14	14
6	ASE Douka	5	1	0	4	116	158	−42	13
7	Aeropos Edessas	4	3	1	0	109	96	+13	17
8	Panellinios	4	3	1	0	114	102	+12	16
9	AEK Athens	4	1	1	2	105	106	−1	13
10	Foivos Sykeon	4	0	1	3	80	100	−20	9
11	YMCA Thessaloniki	4	0	2	2	80	84	−4	8
12	Archelaos Katerinis	0	0	0	0	0	0	0	0

- Archelaos Katerinis withdrew.

Pld – Played; W – Won; D – Drawn; L – Lost; GF – Goals for; GA – Goals against; Diff – Difference; Pts – Points.

== Finals ==
Finals
1	Diomidis Argous	20	17	21
2	Filippos Veria	18	18	26
