= 2016–17 Greek Handball Premier =

Handball Premier
- Season: 2016–17
- Champions: IEK Xini DIKEAS
- Relegated: Aris Nikaias; AESX Pylaia
- Matches: 141
- Goals: 6,630 (47.02 per match)
- Top goalscorer: (Greece) Ioulios Argirou (148 goals)

The 2016–17 Greek Handball Premier was the 38th season of the Greek Handball Premier, Greece's premier handball league. It ran from 24 September 2016 to 27 May 2017.

== Teams ==
Location of teams in Greek Handball Championship 2016–17

A total of 12 teams participated in this year's edition of the Handball Premier. Of these, 10 sides qualified directly from the 2015–16 season and the play-off winners from each of the two groups of A2 Ethniki were promoted: Aris Nikaias from Group A and AESX Pylaia from Group B.

Poseidon Loutrakiou, despite finishing 5th in the last year's Handball Premier, announced the shutdown of their handball department and thus withdrew from the league. They were replaced by Serifato Aigio who beat GS Drama 1986 in a single, neutral venue play-off match. This was the first time for Serifato to compete in the top league.

Team	Location
AEK	Athens
Aeropos Edessa	Edessa
AESX Pylaia	Pylaia, Thessaloniki
Aris Nikaias	Nikaia, Piraeus
IEK Xini DIKEAS	Nea Ionia, Athens
Diomidis Argous	Argos
ASE Douka	Maroussi, Athens
Filippos Veria	Veria
Foivos Sykeon	Sykies, Thessaloniki
Panellinios	Athens
PAOK	Thessaloniki
Serifato Aigio	Aigio

== Regular season ==
=== League table ===
Pos	Team	Pld	W	D	L	GF	GA	GD	Pts	Qualification or relegation
1	IEK Xini DIKEAS	22	20	1	1	591	471	+120	41	Qualification to Championship play-offs
2	AEK	22	15	2	5	613	546	+67	32 (Note: AEK ahead of Doukas on head-to-head record; Doukas ahead of Diomidis on head-to-head record; Diomidis–AEK 26–28, Doukas–AEK 21–27, Diomidis–Doukas 18–20, Doukas–Diomidis 29–19, AEK–Doukas 35–30, AEK–Diomidis 20–23.)	Qualification to Championship play-offs
3	ASE Douka	22	15	2	5	551	479	+72	32	Qualification to Championship play-offs
4	Diomidis Argous	22	15	2	5	541	468	+73	32	Qualification to Championship play-offs
5	PAOK	22	14	3	5	606	494	+112	31	
6	Panellinios	22	11	4	7	511	496	+15	26	
7	Filippos Veria	22	10	5	7	553	524	+29	25	
8	Aeropos Edessa	22	7	0	15	567	567	0	14	
9	Serifato Aigio	22	6	1	15	539	618	−79	13	
10	Foivos Sykeon	22	4	2	16	452	546	−94	10	
11	AESX Pylaia (R)	22	2	2	18	501	662	−161	6	Relegation to 2017–18 A2 Ethniki
12	Aris Nikaias (Note: Aris Nikaias were deducted 1 point as they did not show up to the last league game against Aeropos Edessa. Aeropos were awarded a 10–0 win.) (R)	22	1	0	21	430	584	−154	1	Relegation to 2017–18 A2 Ethniki

Source: Hellenic Handball Federation
Rules for classification: 1) Points; 2) Head-to-head points; 3) Head-to-head goal difference; 4) Head-to-head away goals (if 2 teams are tied); 5) Head-to-head goals scored (if more than 2 teams are tied); 6) Goal difference; 7) Goals scored; 8) Draw or single play-off game (only used if needed to decide champion, teams for relegation or qualification for European competitions).
(R) Relegated

=== Results ===
Home \ Away	AEK	AER	AES	ARI	DIK	DIO	DOU	FIL	FOI	PAN	PAO	SER
AEK	—	29–25	42–25	26–24	22–25	20–23	35–30	23–27	27–20	19–19	22–24	27–25
Aeropos Edessa	29–31	—	32–20	10–0	22–27	21–22	23–25	30–34	34–28	27–28	24–28	31–23
AESX Pylaia	27–35	28–34	—	29–28	23–41	20–34	18–32	22–26	22–22	22–26	20–34	23–23
Aris Nikaias	20–28	20–26	23–22	—	17–25	17–29	21–28	16–26	23–25	20–27	23–31	24–30
IEK Xini DIKEAS	26–23	28–26	30–16	35–20	—	18–18	27–26	32–27	24–20	28–22	26–25	29–24
Diomidis Argous	26–28	28–24	38–23	26–19	22–17	—	18–20	25–25	32–14	19–16	19–18	27–22
ASE Douka	21–27	27–19	28–22	25–13	21–29	29–19	—	21–20	22–19	24–20	25–17	29–18
Filippos Veria	26–30	23–24	28–26	25–22	22–27	21–22	26–26	—	25–13	23–23	22–22	30–24
Foivos Sykeon	24–29	25–23	21–20	25–20	19–25	15–18	17–29	21–21	—	17–19	22–31	20–27
Panellinios	23–24	30–24	32–26	23–18	18–24	22–21	20–20	19–24	22–17	—	21–21	27–20
PAOK	24–24	31–19	33–23	29–20	21–22	29–22	31–17	25–26	28–24	34–26	—	33–24
Serifato Aigio	33–42	32–30	20–24	24–22	17–26	30–33	20–26	31–26	25–24	24–28	23–37	—

Source: Hellenic Handball Federation
Legend: Blue = home team win; Yellow = draw; Red = away team win.
For upcoming matches, an "a" indicates there is an article about the rivalry between the two participants.

== Championship play-offs ==
In the championship play-offs, the top four teams of the regular season play each other in a round robin format. However, they do not all start with 0 points. Instead, each team's sum of points is divided by two (rounded up if number is odd).

So, IEK Xini DIKEAS began the play-offs with 21 points, while Diomidis Argous, ASE Douka and AEK all began with 16 points.

=== Standings ===
Pos	Team	Pld	W	D	L	GF	GA	GD	Pts	Qualification	DIK	DOU	AEK	DIO
1	IEK Xini DIKEAS	3	1	0	2	71	71	0	23	Qualification to 2016–17 Finals	—	19–20	27–32	—
2	ASE Douka	3	3	0	0	69	61	+8	22	Qualification to 2016–17 Finals	—	—	—	23–22
3	AEK	3	2	0	1	81	80	+1	20		—	20–26	—	29–27
4	Diomidis Argous	3	1	0	2	68	77	−9	18		19–25	—	—	—

Source: Hellenic Handball Federation
Rules for classification: 1) Points; 2) Extra point due to rounding up (in case of a tie, teams that have received an extra point due to rounding up their starting points are at a disadvantage); 3) Head-to-head points; 4) Head-to-head goal difference; 5) Head-to-head goals scored (if more than 2 teams are tied); 6) Goal difference; 7) Goals scored; 8) Draw or single play-off game (only used if needed to decide champion, teams for relegation or qualification for European competitions).
(Note: Head-to-head criteria [3, 4, 5] include matches played in the regular season between the tied teams. Criteria 6 and 7 only include matches in the play-off stage.)

== Finals ==
In the finals, teams playing against each other have to win three games to win the series. Thus, if one team wins three games before all five games have been played, the remaining games are omitted. The team that finished in the higher championship play-off place, is going to play the first, second and fifth (if necessary) game of the series at home.

Team 1	Agg.	Team 2	Game 1	Game 2	Game 3	Game 4	Game 5
IEK Xini DIKEAS	3–0	ASE Douka	25–21	27–26	22–19	–	–

Source: Hellenic Handball Federation
