= A2 Ethniki Volleyball =

Men's volleyball league in Greece

- Current season, competition or edition: 2018–19 A2 Ethniki Volleyball
- Sport: Volleyball
- Founded: 1988
- No. of teams: 35
- Country: Greece
- Continent: (European Union) Europe
- Most recent champion: Iraklis
- Most titles: AEK Athens (5)
- Promotion to: A1 Ethniki Volleyball - 1st Tier
- Relegation to: Beta Ethniki Volleyball - 3rd Tier
- Domestic cup: Greek Volleyball Cup
- Website: www.volleyball.gr

A2 Ethniki Volleyball or Greek A2 Volleyball League is the third-tier of the Greek volleyball championship system in Greece. It used to be the second-tier until the founding of the Pre-league tier replacing A2 as the second tier making A2 the third one, since 2019. It was founded in 1988. The winner teams promoted to A1 Ethniki Volleyball. The championship is held in three groups of teams. The winner of each group plays in a play-off championship and the two best teams of play-off promoted to A1 Ethniki. The recent season, the winners are AEK Athens and AE Komotinis

== Winners ==
=== 1988–2017 ===
Season	Champion
1988–89	Ionikos Nea Filadelfeia
1989–90	AGS Giannena
1990–91	Ellinika Naupigeia V.C.
1991–92	Panellinios G.S.
1992–93	Ionikos Nea Filadelfeia
1993–94	AEK Athens
1994–95	AONS Milon
1995–96	Filia Ilioupolis
1996–97	AE Komotinis
1997–98	Ionikos Nikaias V.C.
1998–99	Panellinios G.S.
1999–00	Aris Nikaias
2000–01	OPE Rethymnou
2000–02	E.A. Patras
2002–03	AEK Athens

Season	Champion
2003–04	Panellinios G.S.
2004–05	G.S. Lamias Achilleus
2005–06	AEK Athens
2006–07	Kifissia AC
2007–08	Apollon Kalamarias
2008–09	AEK Athens
2009–10	Epikouros Polichnis
2010–11	Foinikas Syros V.C.
2011–12	Niki Aiginiou
2012–13	Panachaiki V.C.
2013–14	M.E.N.T. V.C.
2014–15	Iraklis Thessaloniki
2015–16	APS Kyzikos
2016–17	Ethnikos Piraeus V.C.

=== 2018–today ===
Season	Champion	
Season	South Group	North Group
2017–18	AEK Athens	AE Komotinis

=== Performance by club ===
Club	Winner
AEK Athens	5
Panellinios G.S.	3
Ionikos Nea Filadelfeia, AE Komotinis	2
AGS Giannena, Epikouros Polichnis, Apollon Kalamarias, Kifissia AC, G.S. Lamias Achilleus, E.A. Patras, OPE Rethymnou, Aris Nikaias, Ionikos Nikaias, Filia Ilioupolis, AONS Milon, Ellinika Naupigeia, Foinikas Syros V.C., Niki Aiginiou, Panachaiki V.C., MENT VC, Iraklis	1

== Current teams ==
The clubs taking part in the 2017–18 league are:

1st Group	2nd Group	3rd Group	4th Group
Panerythraikos V.C.; Pallene V.C.; Apollon Smyrnis V.C.; Panionios V.C.; APS Kyzikos; APS Apollon; AEP Olympias; AO Kalamata 1980; OFI; SFP Chania; AS Kerkis	Ionikos Nea Filadelfeia; AEK Athens; Markopoulo V.C.; SFAM Pheobus; DAS Drapetsonas; AON Argyroupolis; E.A. Patras; AO Egaleo; AO Athlopedion Cos; Rodion Athelesis	AS Athlos Orestias; G.S. Alexandroupolis; MSAE Komotinis; Orestiada V.C.; A.O. Serron; AS Elpis Ampelokipon; Aris Thessaloniki; Apollon Kalamarias	GAS Archelaos Katerinis; Anagennisi Artas; APS Phthia; AS Makedonikos; AMS Nestor; Pegasos Polichnis; X.A.N. Thessaloniki
