= A2 Ethniki (disambiguation) =

The name A2 Ethniki may refer to:

- A2 Ethniki, the 2nd-tier Greek basketball League
- A2 Ethniki Volleyball, the 2nd-tier Greek volleyball League
- A2 Ethniki Water Polo, the 2nd-tier Greek water polo League
- A2 Ethniki Handball, the 2nd-tier Greek handball League
- A2 Ethniki Women's Basketball, the 2nd-tier Greek women's basketball League
- A2 Ethniki Women's Volleyball, the 2nd-tier Greek women's volleyball League
