= Petros Boukovinas =

Greek handball player (born 1994)

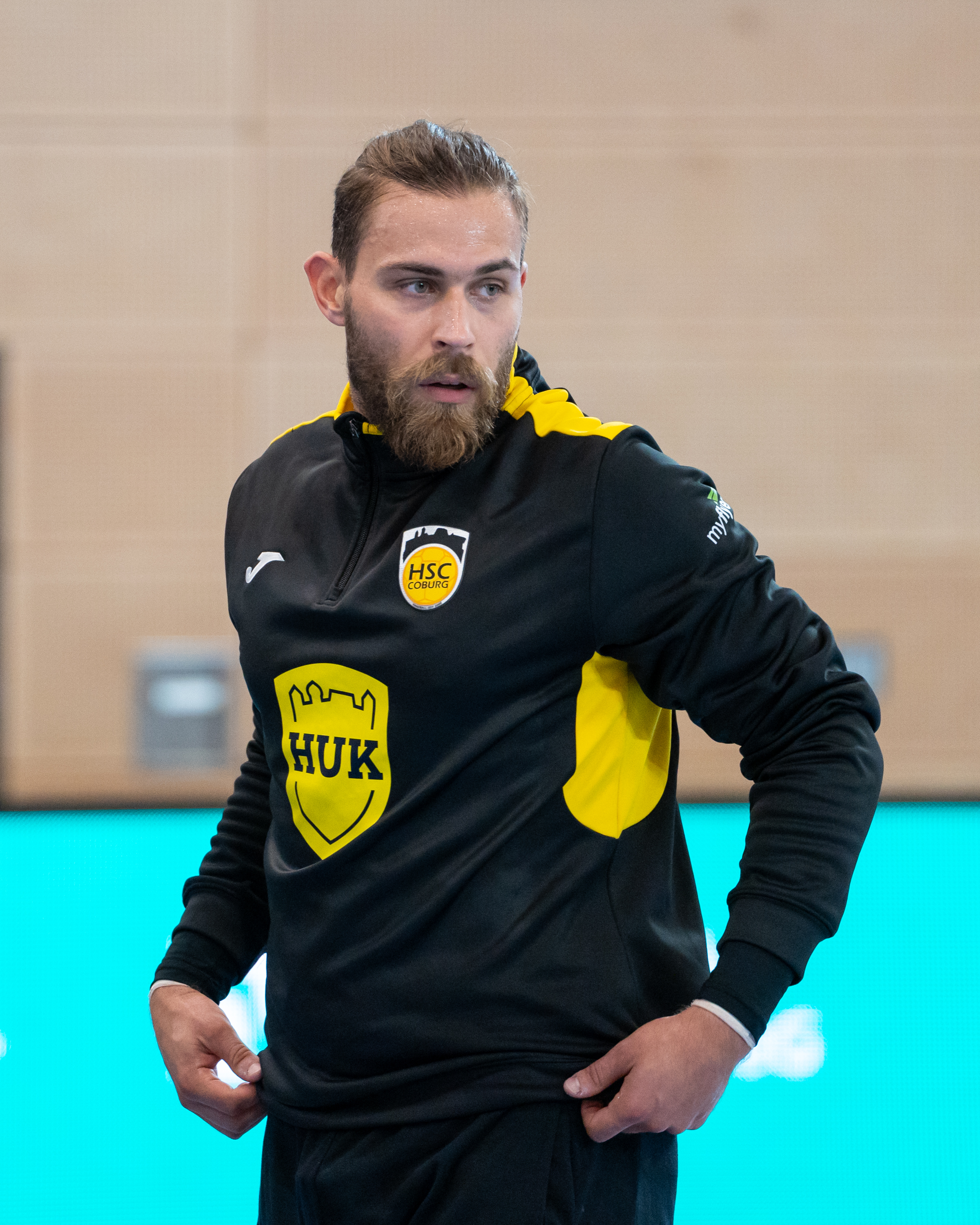

Personal information
- Full name: Petros Boukovinas
- Nationality: Greek
- Born: 8 March 1994 (age 32) Thessaloniki, Greece
- Height: 1.88 m (6 ft 2 in)

Sport
- Sport: Handball
- Position: Goalkeeper
- Current club: HSC 2000 Coburg
- Number: 1

Senior clubs
- Years: Team
- 2012–2014: X.A.N. Thessaloniki
- 2014–2016: PAOK Thessaloniki
- 2016–2017: Filippos Veria
- 2017–2021: HB Esch
- 2021–2022: AEK Athens
- 2022–2024: TV Großwallstadt
- 2024–: HSC 2000 Coburg
National team
Years	Team	Apps	(Gls)
2016–	Greece	66	(14)

Petros Boukovinas (Greek: Πέτρος Μπουκοβίνας; born 8 March 1994) is a Greek handball player for German club HSC 2000 Coburg and the Greece national team.

== Career ==
Boukovinas played in Greece for PAOK Thessaloniki until 2016 and then for Filippos Veria in the 2016/17 season. In 2017 he went to the Luxembourg club HB Esch. In 2021 he returned to Greece and played for AEK Athens. The summer of 2022, Boukovinas moved to the German second division team TV Großwallstadt. In the 2022/23 season, he recorded 376 saves, the most in the league.

He is member of the Greece national team. At the 2024 European Championship he took 23rd place with the team. This was the first time Greece had qualified for the European Championship.
