= Greek Men's Handball Super Cup =

Greek Handball Super Cup
- Sport: Handball
- Founded: 1999; 27 years ago
- Founder: Hellenic Handball Federation
- No. of teams: 2
- Country: Greece
- Most recent champion: Olympiacos (5th title)
- Most titles: Olympiacos (5 titles)
- Domestic cups: Handball Premier; Greek Cup
- Website: www.handball.org.gr

The Greek Handball Super Cup is the third most important competition in Greek handball. The Super Cup is organised by the Hellenic Handball Federation (Greek: ΟΧΕ). The first Super Cup final took place on 13 September 1999. The most successful club in the competition, Olympiacos, has won five trophies.

== Previous winners ==
- 1999 : Ionikos Nea Filadelfeia
- 2022 : Olympiacos
- 2023 : Olympiacos
- 2024 : Olympiacos
- 2025 : Olympiacos
- 2026 : Olympiacos

== Finals ==
Year	Winner	Score	Runner up	Stadium	Location	Ref.
1999	Ionikos Nea Filadelfeia	26–20	ASE Douka	Panellinios Indoor Hall	Athens	
2022	Olympiacos	30–24	AESH Pylaia	Ilioupoli Indoor Hall	Athens	
2023	Olympiacos	26–25	AEK	Marousi Indoor Hall	Athens	
2024	Olympiacos	32–25	PAOK	Ilioupoli Indoor Hall	Athens	
2025	Olympiacos	24–23	AEK	Kamatero Indoor Hall	Athens	
2026	Olympiacos	35–24	AEK	Kamatero Indoor Hall	Athens	

== Performances ==
=== By club ===
Club	Cups	Cup's year	Finalist
Olympiacos	5	2022, 2023, 2024, 2025, 2026	–
Ionikos Nea Philadelphia	1	1999	–
AEK	–		3
ASE Douka	–		1
AESH Pylaia	–		1
PAOK	–		1

=== By city ===
City	Number of Titles	Clubs
Piraeus	5	Olympiacos (5)
Athens	1	Ionikos Nea Filadelfeia (1)
