= Charalampos Mallios =

Greek handball player (born 1987)

Charis Mallios
Personal information
- Full name: Charalampos Mallios
- Nationality: Greek
- Born: 6 August 1987 (age 39) Athens, Greece
- Height: 1.82 m (6 ft 0 in)

Sport
- Sport: Handball
- Position: Center back
- Current club: ESN Vrilissia

Senior clubs
- Years: Team
- 2005–2010: Panellinios
- 2010–2012: Diomidis Argous
- 2012–2013: HF Springe
- 2013–2014: Diomidis Argous
- 2014–2016: Stralsund HV
- 2016–2017: HSG Kaiserslautern
- 2017–2018: Nilüfer Belediyespor
- 2018–2019: Batman Belediyespor
- 2019–2020: Olympiacos
- 2020–2021: Besa Famgas
- 2021–2023: Diomidis Argous
- 2023: Nancy Handball
- 2023–2024: AEK Athens
- 2024–2025: LHC Cottbus
- 2025–: ESN Vrilissia
National team
Years	Team	Apps	(Gls)
2008–2025	Greece	87	(225)

Charalampos "Charis" Mallios (Greek: Χαράλαμπος "Χάρης" Μάλλιος; born 6 August 1987) is a Greek handball player.

He played for the Greek club Panellinios Athens and moved from there to Diomidis Argous. In the 2012–2013 season, he was under contract with the German third-division team HF Springe until the early termination of his contract in January 2013. Then he returned to Diomidis. From the beginning of September 2014, he was under contract with the German third division Stralsunder HV. After the 2015–2016 season, Mallios left Stralsund HV. As Diomidis Argous player, he won the 2011–12 EHF Challenge Cup. In July 2023, he signed a contract with Greek champions AEK Athens handball club.
