= P.A.O.K. H.C. =

Greek handball club

PAOK
- Full name: Panthessalonikios Athlitikos Omilos Konstantinoupoliton Thessaloniki Handball Club
- Nicknames: Double-Headed Eagle of the North; White-Blacks
- Founded: 1999; 27 years ago
- Arena: Mikra Indoor Arena III
- Capacity: 1,380
- President: Nikolaos Paraskevopoulos
- Head coach: Charalampos Ananiadis
- League: Handball Premier
- 2024–25: 5th
- Club colours
Home	Away

PAOK Handball Club is the handball section of PAOK, the major multi-sports club based in Thessaloniki, Greece. PAOK has both men's and women's team. So far, men's team has won 3 Greek Championships and 4 Greek Cups and women's team has won 6 Greek Championships and 7 Greek Cups. Despite its relatively short history, it is considered amongst the most successful departments of the club.

Location of P.A.O.K. H.C.

== History ==
PAOK Handball Club was founded in 1999 after it merged with another club from Thessaloniki, Triton. Stelios Seirekidis, former club's coach, has connected his name with the whole club's history. PAOK was promoted to A1 Ethniki for first time in 2000–01 season. Three years later, they relegated to A2 Ethniki, but they were promoted back to the top-tier level the following season. As the years passed, the team became stronger and they won two consecutive Greek Handball Championships in 2009 and 2010. PAOK defeated Panellinios at the last game of the 2009 play-offs and Doukas at the last game of the 2010 play-offs. In 2009–10 season, PAOK became the second Greek team after Filippos Veria, who reached the EHF Champions League group stage. In 2011, even though PAOK needed only a draw in the last home game in Thessaloniki to secure their third consecutive title, they lost the championship to AEK. In 2012, PAOK won the Greek Cup by beating AEK 25–24 in Patras. In 2015, PAOK claimed the double for the first time overcoming Diomidis Argous in the Greek Championship play-off finals and beating AEK 29–27 in the Greek Cup final held at the P.A.O.K. Sports Arena in Thessaloniki. In 2017, PAOK prevailed over Panellinios with 25–23 in Kozani, winning the Greek Cup for the third time. In 2024, PAOK won 21–20 against Drama and earned their fourth Greek Cup title.

== Crest, colours, supporters ==
=== Kits ===
HOME
2016–17	2021–22	2023–24

AWAY
2016–17	2017–18	2023–24

== Team ==
=== Current squad ===
Squad for the 2025–26 season

P.A.O.K. H.C.

Goalkeepers

- 15 (Greece) Athanasios Boumpoulentras
- 16 (Greece) Andreas Orfanoudakis
- 32 (Serbia) Igor Arsić

Left Wingers

- 8 (Greece) Giorgos Papavasilis
- 10 (Greece) Nikolaos Nikolaidis (c)

Right Wingers

- 9 (North Macedonia) Evgenij Temelkoski
- 11 (Greece) Grigorios Ioannou

Line Players

- 14 (Egypt) Mohammed Essam Mourad Abdelsadek
- 22 (Greece) Ioannis Batzios
- 73 (Egypt) Mohamed Mamdouh Shebib

Left Backs

- 4 (Greece) Emmanouil Ladakis
- 30 (Greece) Dimitrios Triantafyllidis

Central Backs

- 5 (Greece) Spyros Katsaounis
- 23 (Greece) Charalampos Dompris
- 44 (Egypt) Moustafa Hassan Ragab Feras Marwan
- 99 (Egypt) Omar Salem

Right Backs

- 18 (Greece) Nikolaos Marinos

=== Technical staff ===
- Head coach: (Greece) Charalampos Ananiadis
- Assistant coach: (Greece) Apostolos Palaskas
- Physiotherapist: (Greece) Panagiotis Papadopoulos

=== Transfers ===
Transfers for the 2025–26 season

Joining

- (Serbia) Igor Arsić (GK) from (North Macedonia) GRK Tikveš
- (Egypt) Mohammed Essam Mourad Abdelsadek (LP) from (Spain) CB Cangas

Leaving

=== Transfer History ===
Transfers for the 2023–24 season

Joining

- (Russia) Danil Bochkarev (CB) from (Greece) Aeropos Edessa
- (Greece) Ioannis Kalomoiros (LB) from (Greece) AEK Athens
- (Greece) Ioannis Batzios (LP) from (Greece) AESH Pylaia
- (Greece) Konstantinos Koukmisis (LW) from (Greece) AESH Pylaia
- (Greece) Dimitrios Papageorgiou (RW) from (Greece) AESH Pylaia

Leaving

- (Serbia) Milos Mojsilov (GK) to (Hungary) Fejér B.Á.L. Veszprém

== Honours ==
- Greek Championship:
  - Winners (3): 2009, 2010, 2015
  - Runners-up (2): 2011, 2021
- Greek Cup:
  - Winners (4): 2012, 2015, 2017, 2024
  - Runners-up (2): 2013, 2021
- Double
  - Winners (1): 2015

== Recent seasons ==
Season	Division	Place	Notes
2000–01	A1 Ethniki	9th	
2001–02	A1 Ethniki	7th	
2002–03	A1 Ethniki	7th	
2003–04	A1 Ethniki	11th	Relegated to A2
2004–05	A2 Ethniki	2nd	Promoted to A1
2005–06	A1 Ethniki	5th	
2006–07	A1 Ethniki	5th	
2007–08	A1 Ethniki	4th	
2008–09	A1 Ethniki	1st	
2009–10	A1 Ethniki	1st	
2010–11	A1 Ethniki	2nd	
2011–12	A1 Ethniki	3rd	Greek Cup Winner
2012–13	A1 Ethniki	4th	Greek Cup Finalist
2013–14	A1 Ethniki	5th	
2014–15	A1 Ethniki	1st	Greek Cup Winner
2015–16	Handball Premier	3rd	
2016–17	Handball Premier	5th	Greek Cup Winner
2017–18	Handball Premier	3rd	
2018–19	Handball Premier	4th	
2019–20	Handball Premier	5th	
2020–21	Handball Premier	2nd	Greek Cup Finalist
2021–22	Handball Premier	3rd	
2022–23	Handball Premier	3rd	
2023–24	Handball Premier	3rd	Greek Cup Winner
2024–25	Handball Premier	5th	
2025–26	Handball Premier	3rd	

== European competition ==
Season	Competition	Round	Club	Home	Away	Aggregate	Advance
2006–07	EHF Challenge Cup	R2	(North Macedonia) RK Vardar	29–34	29–43	58–77	
2007–08	EHF Challenge Cup	R2	(Serbia) RK Kolubara	28–31		3rd place	
2007–08	EHF Challenge Cup	R2	(England) Great Dane HC London	32–21		3rd place	
2007–08	EHF Challenge Cup	R2	(Ukraine) Burevestnik Lugansk	28–32		3rd place	
2008–09	EHF Challenge Cup	R3	(Russia) Sungul Snezhinsk	23–23	25–25	48–48	
2008–09	EHF Challenge Cup	1/8	(Romania) Știința Bacău	28–31	29–31	57–62	
2009–10	EHF Champions League	QR	(Cyprus) SPE Strovolos	32–29		1st place	
2009–10	EHF Champions League	QR	(Ukraine) ZTR Zaporizhia	30–30		1st place	
2009–10	EHF Champions League	Group Stage	(Russia) Chekhovskiye Medvedi	25–37	22–46	6th place	
2009–10	EHF Champions League	Group Stage	(France) Montpellier HB	23–34	20–46	6th place	
2009–10	EHF Champions League	Group Stage	(Hungary) SC Pick Szeged	27–26	24–27	6th place	
2009–10	EHF Champions League	Group Stage	(Spain) BM Valladolid	27–37	19–38	6th place	
2009–10	EHF Champions League	Group Stage	(Romania) HCM Constanța	26–30	23–34	6th place	
2010–11	EHF Cup	R2	(Austria) A1 Bregenz	23–31	24–27	47–58	
2011–12	EHF Cup	R2	(Hungary) Tatabánya KC	23–27	25–29	48–56	
2012–13	EHF Challenge Cup	1/16	(Norway) IL Runar	31–32	26–36	57–68	
2013–14	EHF Challenge Cup	R3	(Belarus) HC Victoria Regia MINSK	26–27	21–28	47–55	
2017–18	EHF Challenge Cup	R2	(Malta) Aloysians Von Taine	39–15	34–17	73–32	
2017–18	EHF Challenge Cup	R3	(Turkey) Göztepe SK	29–28	26–35	55–63	
2021–22	EHF European Cup	R3	(Latvia) TENAX Dobele	29–24	28–25	57–49	
2021–22	EHF European Cup	1/8	(Romania) CS Minaur Baia Mare	28–27	21–32	49–59	
2022–23	EHF European Cup	R2	(Croatia) Sesvete	21–27	24–29	45–56	
2023–24	EHF European Cup	R2	(Austria) Linz AG	25–25	26–27	51–52	
2024–25	EHF European Cup	R2	(Cyprus) Anorthosis	33–37	24–30	57–67	
2025–26	EHF European Cup	R1	(Greece) ESN Vrilissia	33–24	27–20	60–44	
2025–26	EHF European Cup	R2	(Israel) Holon Yuvalim	31–31	29–25	60–56	
2025–26	EHF European Cup	R3	(Turkey) Beşiktaş JK	25–30	25–29	54–55	
2026–27	EHF European Cup	R1	(Luxembourg) HB Dudelange	29–21	33–28	62–49	
2026–27	EHF European Cup	R2	(Bosnia and Herzegovina) RK Borac m:tel	38–19	19–26	57–45	
2026–27	EHF European Cup	R3	(Israel) AS SGS Rahat Hashron	–	–	–	

=== EHF ranking ===
As of 06/12/2023

Rank	Team	Points
126	(Lithuania) Granitas Kaunas	37
127	(Netherlands) HV Hurry-Up	37
128	(Greece) P.A.O.K. H.C.	36
129	(Estonia) HC Tallinn	36
130	(Switzerland) BSV Bern	36
131	(Switzerland) GC Amicitia Zürich	36
132	(Portugal) Belenenses	36

== Former club members ==
=== Notable former players ===
- (Greece) Alexandros Alvanos (2014–2016)
- (Greece) Petros Boukovinas (2014–2016)
- (Greece) Vyron Papadopoulos (2003–2009)
- (Greece) Grigorios Sanikis (2016–2017)
- (Czech Republic) Jan Komínek (2009–2011)
- (Hungary) István Székely (2006–2007)
- (Montenegro) Marko Pejovic (2017–2018)
- (Serbia) Milan Grubanov (2009–2010)
