= Christoforos Bakaoukas =

Greek handball player

Personal information
- Nationality: Greek
- Born: 3 February 1978 (age 48) Athens, Greece
- Height: 1.75 m (5 ft 9 in)

Sport
- Sport: Handball
- Position: Right wing

Senior clubs
- Years: Team
- 1998–2005: Ionikos Nea Filadelfeia
- 2005–2016: AEK Athens
National team
Years	Team		
–	Greece		
Medal record
World Championships
- Updated on 12 December 2012

Christoforos Bakaoukas (born 20 November 1979 in Salamina, Greece) is a former professional handball right wing who last played for AEK Athens H.C.

== Clubs ==
- Ionikos Nea Filadelfeia (1998–05)
- AEK Athens H.C. (2005–2016)

== Honours ==
- AEK Athens H.C
  - 2 Greek Men's handball championship: 2011, 2013
  - 3 Greek men's handball cup: 2009, 2013, 2014
