= Georgios Zaravinas =

Greek handball player and coach (born 1976)

Giorgos Zaravinas
Personal information
- Full name: Georgios Zaravinas
- Nationality: Greek
- Born: 13 June 1976 (age 50) Agrinio, Greece

Sport
- Sport: Handball
- Position: Left wing
- Current club: Diomidis Argous (manager); Greece (manager)

Senior clubs
- Years: Team
- 1991–1995: Zeus Agriniou
- 1995–2010: Panellinios
- 2010–2014: Diomidis Argous
National team
- Years: Team
- 1998–2011: Greece

Teams managed
- 2014–2017: Panellinios
- 2017–2020: Olympiacos
- 2020–2022: Anorthosis
- 2021–: Greece
- 2022–: Diomidis Argous

Georgios Zaravinas (Greek: Γεώργιος Ζαραβίνας; born 13 June 1976) is a Greek former handball player and current coach. He competed in the men's tournament at the 2004 Summer Olympics.
