= A2 Ethniki Handball =

- Sport: Handball
- No. of teams: 20
- Country: Greece
- Continent: (European Union) (Europe)
- Most recent champions: Aris Nikaias, AESH Pylaias
- Level on pyramid: 2
- Promotion to: A1 Ethniki

A2 Ethniki Handball is the 2nd-tier of Greek handball championship. It is held in two groups with teams separated according to geographical criteria. The first teams of each group promoted to A1 Ethniki. In recent year, the champions were Aris Nikaias and AESH Pylaias. The previous season the winners were Ionikos Nea Filadelfeia and Aeropos Edessas. However, Archelaos Katerinis had replaced Ionikos in A1 Ethniki, because it had withdrawn from this championship.

== Winners ==
=== Recent winners ===
- 2001–02: AS Xini
- 2002–03: GS Ilioupolis
- 2003–04: Koropi H.C.
- 2004–05: X.A.N. Thessaloniki
- 2005–06: Ilisiakos / Aeropos Edessas
- 2006–07: Koropi H.C. / Thermaikos H.C.
- 2007–08: Minotavros Patras / Zafeirakis Naoussas
- 2008–09: Kydon Chanion / Aeropos Edessas
- 2009–10: Ionikos Nea Filadelfeia
- 2010–11: GAS Kilkis
- 2011–12: Poseidon Loutrakiou / Phoebus Sykeon
- 2012–13: Anagennisi Vyrona / Archelaos Katerinis
- 2013–14: DIKE.AS. Nea Ionia / Drama 86
- 2014–15: Ionikos Nea Filadelfeia / Aeropos Edessas
- 2015–16: Aris Nikaias / AESH Pylaias
- Source:Handball Federation, Statistics

== Current teams ==
The clubs taking part in the 2017–18 league are:

1st Group	2nd Group
Aris Nikaias; ESN Vrilissia; Esperos Kallitheas; AO Nireus; OF Neas Ionias; Olympiacos Keratsiniou; Kentavros Agrias; Leonidas Agion Anargyron; Ionikos Nea Philadelfia; Poseidon Loutrakiou; Acadimia Patras	Phaeax Kerkyra; AESH Pileas; Zafeirakis Naoussas; Alexandros Alexandroupolis; Kyklopes Alexandroupolis; Archelaos Katerinis; Proteas Artas; GAS Kilkis; AS Makedonikos; Arion Ptolemaidas
