= Filippos Veria H.C. =

Greek handball club

Filippos Verias
- Full name: Filippos Verias Handball Club
- Nickname(s): Vasilias (The King); Erythrolefkoi (The Red-Whites)
- Short name: Filippos
- Founded: 1977
- Arena: Filippeio Indoor Hall
- Capacity: 1,135
- President: Giorgos Fikatas
- Head coach: Marios Katikaridis
- Captain: Stavros Papadopoulos
- League: A2 Ethniki Handball
- 2021–2022: Handball Premier, 11th (relegated)
| Home | Away |

Filippos Veria H.C. (Greek: Φίλιππος Βέροιας) is a Greek handball club based in Veria, section of multi-sports club Filippos Veria. The handball department of Filippos was founded in 1977 and its colours are white and red. Its emblem is Philip of Macedonia. Filippos is also known as "Vasilias (the king)" and it is the second most successful club in Premier Handball/A1 Ethniki history.

== History ==
Filippos Veria Handball Club was founded in 1977, when the first Greek Handball tournament was held. Filippos won the first tournament in 1977, organised by SEGAS. The next years Filippos won 8 moreover championships (reaching 9 totally) and 5 cups and became the club with the most titles in Greek Handball along with Ionikos Nea Filadelphia. In 2003 Filippos played in the final of EHF Challenge Cup but it was defeated by Danish team Skjern Håndbold. It was the first Greek handball club that played in a final of a European competition. Filippos also participated in 2003–04 EHF Champions League where they achieved three wins in six matches and they were disqualified in a quadruple tie as they had the worst GD. After four years of decline, Filippos finished 4th in the A1 championship and after PAOK's rejection to play in the EHF Challenge Cup, they registered to the competition and they'll replace the team. This was the first time after five years that Filippos would participate in a European competition. Moreover, Theodoros Karipidis (president and owner of Veria), involvement in Filippos, boosted club's morale and confidence and it appears that there's an opportunity for the dream to resurrect from its ashes. In co-operation with Karipidis, the board of the club achieved to sign the captain of the Greek national team, Giorgos Mastrogiannis, as well as Savvas Karypidis.

=== Recent seasons ===
| Season | Division | Place | Notes |
|---|---|---|---|
| 2000–01 | A1 Ethniki | 2nd | |
| 2001–02 | A1 Ethniki | 3rd | |
| 2002–03 | A1 Ethniki | 1st | Winner Greek Cup |
| 2003–04 | A1 Ethniki | 2nd | |
| 2004–05 | A1 Ethniki | 2nd | |
| 2005–06 | A1 Ethniki | 3rd | |
| 2006–07 | A1 Ethniki | 2nd | Winner Greek Cup |
| 2007–08 | A1 Ethniki | 5th | |
| 2008–09 | A1 Ethniki | 5th | Finalist Greek Cup |
| 2009–10 | A1 Ethniki | 2nd | |
| 2010–11 | A1 Ethniki | 5th | |
| 2011–12 | A1 Ethniki | 8th | |
| 2012–13 | A1 Ethniki | 9th | |
| 2013–14 | A1 Ethniki | 7th | |
| 2014–15 | A1 Ethniki | 5th | |
| 2015–16 | Handball Premier | 1st | Winner Greek Cup |
| 2016–17 | Handball Premier | 7th | |
| 2017–18 | Handball Premier | 7th | |
| 2018–19 | Handball Premier | 9th | |
| 2019–20 | Handball Premier | 12th | |
| 2020–21 | Handball Premier | 7th | |
| 2021–22 | Handball Premier | 11th | Relegated to A2 |

== European record ==
| Season | Competition | Round | Club | 1st leg | 2nd leg | Aggregate |
|---|---|---|---|---|---|---|
| 2015–16 | EHF Challenge Cup | R2 | (Russia) SKIF Krasnodar | 35–29 | 26–31 | 61–60 |
| 2015–16 | EHF Challenge Cup | R3 | (Greece) A.E.K. Athens | 36–34 | 32–22 | 68–56 |
| 2015–16 | EHF Challenge Cup | 1/8 | (Portugal) S.L. Benfica | 14–34 | 26–23 | 40–57 |
| 2016–17 | EHF Cup | R1 | (Montenegro) RK Budvanska Rivijera | 30–24 | 28–26 | 58–50 |
| 2016–17 | EHF Cup | R2 | (Poland) NMC Górnik Zabrze | 17–30 | 15–20 | 32–50 |

== Honours ==
- Greek Men's Handball Championship
  - Winner (9): 1986, 1988, 1989, 1990, 1991, 1994, 1995, 2003, 2016
- Greek Men's Handball Cup
  - Winner (6): 1985, 1991, 1992, 2003, 2007, 2016
- EHF Cup Winners' Cup
  - Semi-finals (1): 1993
- EHF Challenge Cup
  - Runners-up (1): 2003

== Current squad ==
Season 2015–16

| Number | Player | Position | Birth Date | Height (m) |
|---|---|---|---|---|
| 1 | (Greece) Christos Evaggelopoulos | Goalkeeper | 18/11/1993 | 1.93 |
| 2 | (Greece) Nikos Arvanitidis | Pivot | 22/6/1988 | 1.84 |
| 3 | (Greece) Nikos Zlatanos | Goalkeeper | 11/10/1994 | 1.88 |
| 5 | (Greece) Nikos Charalabidis | Left Extreme | 25/1/1997 | 1.88 |
| 6 | (Greece) Stefanos Michailidis | Left Inter | 15/5/1994 | 1.98 |
| 7 | (Greece) Diogenis Apostolidis | Left Inter | 23/2/1996 | 1.93 |
| 9 | (Greece) Anastasios Pantelidis | Left Inter | 23/2/1996 | 1.80 |
| 10 | (Greece) Charalampos Ananiadis | Pivot | 29/7/1986 | 1.90 |
| 11 | (Greece) Dimitris Mpantis | Play Maker | 15/6/1980 | 1.92 |
| 12 | (Greece) Akis Psomiadis | Goalkeeper | 3/8/1996 | 1.88 |
| 14 | (Greece) Theofanis Deligiannis | Left Extreme | 11/5/1987 | 1.80 |
| 20 | (Greece) Savas Karipidis | Right Extreme | 23/5/1979 | 1.82 |
| 21 | (Greece) Kostas Psomiadis | Left Extreme | 1/6/1997 | 1.88 |
| 22 | (Greece) Giorgos Kotsifas | Goalkeeper | 27/6/1982 | 1.87 |
| 23 | (Greece) Angelos Dragolas | Right extreme | 14/4/1991 | 1.85 |
| 25 | (Greece) Giorgos Mastrogiannis | Play Maker | 30/8/1981 | 1.84 |
| 31 | (Greece) Kostas Tsilimparis | Play Maker | 30/8/1981 | 1.84 |
| 33 | (Greece) Thomas Koronas | Goalkeeper | 9/3/1994 | 1.85 |
| 55 | (Greece) Stauros Rebelakos | Left Extreme | 13/6/1989 | 1.76 |
| 69 | (Greece) Stauros Papadopoulos | Left Extreme | 28/5/1980 | 1.80 |
| 88 | (Greece) Nikos Nikolaidis | Left Extreme | 21/4/1988 | 1.75 |

== Technical staff ==
Technical staff
| Head coach | (Greece) Kostas Toutsis |
| Assistant coach | (Greece) Kostas Deligiannis |
| Fitness coach | (Greece) Giannis Tzoumakis |

== See also ==
- Filippos Veria
- Filippos Verias B.C.
- Veria F.C.
- GE Verias
