= GAS Archelaos Katerinis =

G.A.S. Archelaos Katerini
- Club crest
- Full name: Gymnastic Athletic Club "Archelaos" Katerini
- Short name: G.A.S. Archelaos
- Sport: Handball; Track and field; Archery; Volleyball; Shooting; Wrestling; Swimming; Artistic gymnastics
- Founded: 29 April 1956 (legal recognition: 1957)
- Based in: Katerini, Pieria, Greece
- Stadium: 2nd DAK of Katerini ("Theodoros Diamantopoulos"); 1st DAK of Katerini (Athletics); Nea Chrani Municipal Field (Archery Range)
- Colors: Green, Yellow (alt: White)
- Chairman: Panagiotis Diamantopoulos
- Website: www.archelaos.club

Gymnastikos Agonistikos Syllogos "Archelaos" Katerini (Greek: Γυμναστικός Αγωνιστικός Σύλλογος «Ο Αρχέλαος» Κατερίνης), commonly known as G.A.S. Archelaos, is a Greek multi-sport club based in Katerini, Pieria. Founded on 29 April 1956 and officially recognised by ruling No. 38/1957 of the Court of First Instance of Katerini (Sports Register No. 2/1957), it is the oldest active multi-sport club in the Pieria regional unit.

The club's official colours are green and yellow (with white as an alternate kit). Its name and emblem are inspired by the ancient Macedonian king Archelaus I, who established the ancient Olympic games of Dion in the neighbouring sacred Macedonian city of Dion.

== Administrative history ==
The institutional origin of G.A.S. Archelaos dates to 29 April 1956 with the drafting of its initial constitution, followed by official court recognition in 1957. The founding Board of Directors consisted of Athanasios Tsaknapis (President), Ioannis Zarogiannis (Vice President), and Theodoros Xiromeritis (Treasurer).

Throughout the club's history, the following individuals have served as president:

Term	President	Key Milestones & Events
1956–1958	Athanasios Tsaknapis	Foundation, adoption of the first statute, and legal incorporation.
1958–1959; 1964–1970	Ioannis Mantzaropoulos	First local sporting events in the Municipal Park; official athletics affiliation with SEGAS (20 May 1967).
1959–1961	Theofilos Kamperidis	Connection with local civic institutions (later Member of Parliament and Mayor of Katerini).
1961	Ioannis Papadimitriou	Interim administration.
1973–1975	Athanasios Efthymiou	Transitional administrative management.
1975–1977	Nikos Tsinopoulos	Post-junta structural reorganization.
1978–1985	Dimitrios (Mitsos) Giannaros	Foundation of the handball (1978), wrestling (1979), basketball, and gymnastics departments.
1985–1990	Efstathios Zannas	Foundation of the swimming department (1980/1985); early rise of the handball team to national prominence.
1990–2000	Dimitrios Papadimitriou / Theodoros Diamantopoulos	Won 2 Greek Handball Cups, represented Greece in European competitions, founded the archery department (1993), construction of the 2nd Municipal Indoor Hall ("Theodoros Diamantopoulos").
2010–2026	Alkinoos (Alkis) Tasopoulos	Administrative stability, restructuring of youth academies (re-elected in 2022, 2025).
2026–present	Panagiotis Diamantopoulos	Facility modernisation and preparation for the club's 70th anniversary.

Over the decades, the club's constitution underwent amendments (in 1969, 1976, 1981, 2000, 2008, and 2015), with the latest statutory revision ratified on 18 April 2022 (Act 81/2022 of the Magistrate's Court of Katerini).

=== Current administration (2026) ===
Following the death of president Alkinoos Tasopoulos on 30 July 2026, the Board of Directors (elected on 30 March 2025) officially reconstituted on 8 September 2026 (Prot. No. 112/10-09-2026) as follows:

Executive Bureau

- President: Panagiotis Diamantopoulos
- 1st Vice President: Charalampos Savvidis
- 2nd Vice President: Dimitrios Galanis
- General Secretary: Athanasios Mavroeidis
- Treasurer: Pavlos Symeonidis

Department Directors (Ephors)

- Handball Director: Charalampos Savvidis
- Track and Field Director: Georgios Athanasiou
- Archery Director: Dimitrios Galanis
- Volleyball Director: Pavlos Symeonidis
- Wrestling Director: Kyriakos Konstantinidis
- Swimming Director: Athanasios Mavroeidis
- Gymnastics Director: Panagiotis Diamantopoulos
- Shooting Director: Chrysoula Koutsoudaki

== Sports departments ==
=== Handball ===
The handball section was founded in January 1978, standing as one of the pioneers of the sport in Greece. The department's first director was Christos Papakonstantinou and its first coach was Ioannis Ziogas. In May 1978, the club organized northern Greece's first promotional tournament.

The men's team quickly established itself among the elite of Greek handball, winning the Greek Men's Handball Cup twice: in 1990 against ASE Douka (27–21) and in 1994 against Ionikos Nea Filadelfeia (27–25). The club also reached the cup final four more times (1984 vs. VAO 18–24; 1993 vs. Ionikos Nea Filadelfeia 33–34 after extra time; 1996 vs. VAO 21–22; and 2000 vs. Panellinios 18–24). In the Greek Championship, Archelaos finished as runner-up in the 1994–95 season and placed third in 1990, 1991, and 1993. As cup winners, the club represented Greece in the EHF Cup Winners' Cup in 1990–91 (facing Halkbank Ankara), 1994–95 (facing Hungarian powerhouse Fotex Veszprém), and 2000–01. In modern years, the club competed in the top-tier Handball Premier during the 2013–14 and 2015–16 seasons. Key figures in the team's historic rise included head coach Sokratis Skoufas and key players such as Giannis Lazaridis and Giorgos Mastorogiannis.

The club developed one of the country's most decorated youth academies, winning two Greek Junior Championships (1984, 1996), four consecutive Greek Youth (Cadet) Championships (1994, 1995, 1996, 1997), and three consecutive Boys' U14 Championships (1993, 1994, 1995). Olympic medalist and international player Savvas Karypidis emerged from the club's academy. The women's handball section was founded in 1986 and competed up to the Greek Women's A1 League. The club also established the annual youth tournament "Pieria Handball Cup" at the 2nd DAK indoor hall. In August 2024, Archelaos Katerini, together with Feronas Veroias, withdrew from an international tournament in Serbia and sent a protest letter to the Hellenic Handball Federation and the Embassy of Cyprus in Belgrade, denouncing the unsanctioned participation of a team representing the occupied northern part of Cyprus.

=== Track and field (Athletics) ===
Athletics is the club's oldest department, officially registered with SEGAS on 20 May 1967 (Club Reg. No. 238). By 1966, the women's athletics team had already finished 5th overall in the national championship standings. During the 1980s and 1990s, Archelaos was recognized as the leading provincial power in Greek athletics, regularly finishing 1st among non-metropolitan clubs and ranking as high as 5th nationally.

Prominent athletes from the department include:

- Kostas Koukodimos (Long jump): Set Greek national records in both indoor (8.09 m) and outdoor long jump (8.36 m in Chania, 1994), alongside multiple Olympic appearances and international medals.
- Elisavet Pesiridou (100 m hurdles): International champion with multiple national and Balkan titles.
- Antonis Papadimitriou (Javelin throw): Set national records across youth, junior, and senior categories (79.56 m in 1987) and won a Balkan Games gold medal (1984).
- Giannis Lefteriotis: Greek indoor pole vault champion at the 1991 National Indoor Championships (5.20 m) with a personal best of 5.30 m.
- Katerina Dalaka: Began her athletic career in the club's academies, setting national youth and scholastic records in the 300 m and 400 m hurdles while representing Archelaos.
- Theoharis Varytimidis (110 m hurdles, 14.00s), Athina Papasotiriou (high jump 1.77 m, heptathlon 5,659 pts), Zaira Lazaridou (shot put), and Georgia Tsanaktsidou (hurdles).
- In recent years, notable athletes include Katerina Recha (bronze medalist in the 100 m hurdles at the 2025 Greek Athletics Championships with 13.93s), sprinter Theodoros Vrontinos (100 m), and Anna Chatzipourgani (400 m hurdles).

Historically, the club organized the annual "Diia en Olympo" international invitational track meet at Katerini Municipal Stadium in cooperation with SEGAS and the municipality.

=== Archery ===
The archery section was founded in late 1993 on the initiative of Konstantinos Myrotis and Anargyros Kapetanakis, branching out from the club's existing shooting department (with early female competitors including Evropi Yfantidou, Dafni Sarri, and Konstantina Gkoutzamani). The club's competitive debut took place in November 1993, and in December 1994 Archelaos hosted the first official tournament in Katerini.

Coached by Ioannis Charisis, the club won the Greek National Outdoor Championship in Men's Recurve Team in both 2025 and 2026 (represented by Charis Iakovidis, Evangelos Charisis, and Evangelos Marinopoulos). In 2024, the team won the Greek Cup. In individual competition, Evangelos Charisis won the Men's Individual Recurve National Championship in 2025 and reached 9th in the world junior rankings, while Charis Iakovidis took individual silver medals in 2025 and 2026. In para-archery, Paralympian Dorothea Poimenidou earned silver at the Rome European Para-Archery Cup and bronze at the 2025 European Para-Archery Cup. The club trains at an outdoor 70-metre range in Nea Chrani and organises the annual Olympus Archery Series.

=== Volleyball ===
The volleyball department was established around 1975 under Orestis Narlagiannis and was a founding member of the regional board in Veria in 1976. Christos Eleftheroudis served as the first ephor, and Theodoros Sfikas served as the first head coach alongside Avraam Terzopoulos.

The men's team competed in the Beta Ethniki (second tier) in 1977–78. In the late 1980s, player-coach Charalampos Karasarlidis led the team to consecutive promotions from the regional divisions to the Gamma Ethniki (1989–90) and back to the Beta Ethniki (1990–91), where it finished 5th in its group in 1993–94. Other head coaches have included Michalis Sarygiannidis, Petros Sarygiannidis, G. Chelidonis, Vas. Papadopoulos, Gavriil Tsakiridis, Ioannis Didaskalou, Kyriakos Kanalis, and Dimitrios Liapis. The women's section was founded in 1976, competing in local championships and promotion playoffs.

Greece women's international outside hitter Stammatia Kyparissi emerged from the club's youth academy. In recent years, the department established a grassroots development partnership with S.F.K. Pierikos under the "Together as One" initiative, coordinating joint training camps and clinics in Katerini.

=== Shooting ===
The shooting department was formed in the mid-1980s, focusing on target shooting with air pistols and air rifles. Charalampos Ioannidis served as ephor from May 1985, followed by Machi Pavlou from 1987 to 1992, with sustained coaching contributions from Evropi Yfantidou, Georgios Grammenopoulos, and Georgios Ioannidis.

The club regularly finished 2nd and 3rd in the team standings at national championships. In 1993, the junior women's 10m air rifle team (E. Gympasi, M. Faka, Ach. Kyrkou) won 1st place while setting a Greek national record (1119/1200). Athlete Dimitra Tsakistara competed in the 1993 Balkan Games in Romania, joined the national Olympic pre-selection squad, and captured national titles in air pistol. Anastasia Ambrosiadou also earned national honours. Other prominent shooters included Sp. Parousiadis, D. Drantzios, N. Geronatsios, N. Podas, M. Antonatos, I. Apatsidis, G. Ziogas, An. Aggelis, Th. Katsaras, N. Liakos, P. Kourmanidou, M. Skoumpopoulou, El. Sarri, Anna Tsirkou, D. Dimitriadou, Aik. Xanthopoulou, and M. Lemonia.

=== Wrestling ===
Founded in 1979/1980, the department developed both freestyle and Greco-Roman wrestling through the initiative of Lazaros Psomiadis and L. Tsakiridis. Dionysios Efthymiadis was appointed first ephor in 1981, and Lazaros Psomiadis served as head coach. Later directors included Michalis Zamanis (1987–1995) and Dimitrios Moixakis (1991).

On the international stage, Dimitris Soulis achieved the club's highest individual international wrestling honour by winning the silver medal (World Vice-Champion) in the Greco-Roman 71 kg event at the 2025 World U17 Wrestling Championships held in Athens on 30 July 2025. Previously, Nikolaos Zamanis won a gold medal at the 1993 Mediterranean Games, silver at the 1990 World Junior Championships, and bronze at the 1988 European Cadet Championships, later becoming national team coach. Alexios Poulikidis took bronze at the 1988 European Junior Championships, while Konstantinos Soulis finished 6th at the World Junior Championships.

At the domestic senior level, Matthaios Engonidis was crowned Greek Men's Heavyweight Champion (120 kg) in 2013. Archelaos has captured the Greek Men's Greco-Roman Team Championship and finished 3rd in the 2024 national club evaluations under coaches Savvas Tsentidis and Konstantinos Tamos. In 1986, it established one of the first female wrestling programs in Greece (featuring Eugenia Pantelidou and Stavroula Psomiadou).

=== Swimming ===
The swimming department was founded in October 1980 with organizational lead Efstathios Zannas and first coach Apostolos Pipilis, pioneering aquatic sports in Pieria. K. Papadopoulos was appointed first ephor in 1981. Coaches between 1982 and 1984 included Emmanouil Katirtzis, Menelaos Dokas, Panagiotis Efthymiou, and Aleka Katsaouni. In 1984, Anargyros Kapetanakis took over as director. A specialised dryland conditioning facility was developed through the initiative of L. Sapranidis.

In the late 1980s and early 1990s, the department developed swimmers who achieved national qualifying standards: Ioannis Provatidis, Pantelis Logginidis, Aikaterini Karapanagiotidou, Georgia Lyra, Sofia Logginidou, Eirini Lyra, Th. Papadopoulos, Chr. Papadopoulos, Fontas Baraliakos, and Aikaterini Georgiadou. Between 1991 and 1993, coaches Christos Kalaitzis, Theodoros Siamagkas, and Rania Daniilidou managed the roster (with Theodoros Papanikolaou as ephor), while standout youth prospects included Theodosis Brapelis, Konstantinos Tzoumerkas, and Vaso Alexiou.

=== Artistic gymnastics ===
The gymnastics section was founded in 1975 under Orestis Narlagiannis, coached by Ioannis Ziogas and Stavros Diamantopoulos, and supported administratively by Stathis Zannas. It was among the first provincial gymnastics programs in Greece. In 1977, the club hosted the 1st Greek Junior & Girls' Championship in Katerini, and in 1978 the girls' department was established (ephor: K. Koutsionas; coach: Th. Paspali).

Beginning in September 1980 under head coach Apostolos Samalis, the boys' youth team dominated national events, taking consecutive national team and all-around titles (Konstantinos Zaras, Charalampos Kakalis, Alexandros Katsikakis, Evangelos Chrysopoulos, and Ioannis Charisis). A subsequent generation followed (Varnas, Zapounidis, Theodoridis, Kalpakidis, Chrysafis), and in 1986 Archelaos claimed 17 of 21 medals at the Northern Greece Regional Meet. In 1992, the girls' section hired Romanian trainer Mariana Constantin Camaletchu (teammate of Nadia Comăneci).

=== Basketball (Merged) ===
The basketball department was founded in 1973 under Theodoros Sfikas, who served as head coach and director until 1977. From 1974, it competed in regional championships and became one of the 11 founding member clubs of EKASKEDYM (later EKASKEM) in 1980.

The men's team won the A EKASKEM Championship in 2001–02 and played in the national Gamma Ethniki for six consecutive seasons (2002–2008). In 2006–07 and 2007–08, it finished 2nd in its group, and in 2007–08 it captured the regional EKASKEM Cup. The women's basketball team earned promotion to the Gamma Ethniki in 1987 and the Beta Ethniki in 1989, having won three EKASKEDYM titles (1981–82, 1987–88, 1988–89) and one EKASKEM title (1997–98).

In the summer of 2008, the boards of Archelaos and the basketball section of S.F.K. Pierikos agreed to merge, founding Pierikos Archelaos, which competed in the national Beta Ethniki during the 2008–09 season.

=== Weightlifting (Inactive) ===
The decision to establish a weightlifting section was made in October 1980 (lead coordinator: D. Paraskevopoulos), and the club formally joined the Greek Weightlifting Federation (EOAB).

Training operations started in late 1985 under coach Georgios Chatzisavvidis. In January 1987, Nikolaos Doukakis assumed duties as ephor and served as the department's main supporter. In 1987–1988, Theodoros Pavlidis was appointed coach, and in March 1988 the club organized official meets at the EAK Katerini sports hall. In February 1989, Emmanouil Zaras became ephor (with assistant Lazaros Kalpakidis and coaches Christos Adam and Petros Mavropoulos). Ongoing facility constraints eventually led to the suspension of active operations.

== Honours and achievements ==
=== Handball ===
- Greek Men's Handball Cup:
  - Winners (2): 1989–90, 1993–94
  - Runners-up (4): 1983–84, 1992–93, 1995–96, 1999–2000
- Greek Men's Handball Championship:
  - Runners-up (1): 1994–95
  - 3rd place (3): 1989–90, 1990–91, 1992–93
- European competitions:
  - Appearances in the EHF Men's Cup Winners' Cup: 1990–91, 1994–95 (vs. Fotex Veszprém), 2000–01
- Greek Youth Championships:
  - Greek Junior (U20) Champions (2): 1984, 1996
  - Greek Youth (U18) Champions (4): 1994, 1995, 1996, 1997
  - Greek Boys' (U14) Champions (3): 1993, 1994, 1995

=== Archery ===
- Greek National Outdoor Championship (Men's Recurve Team):
  - Champions (2): 2025, 2026
- Greek Cup:
  - Winners (1): 2024
- Greek National Outdoor Championship (Men's Recurve Individual):
  - 1st place (1): 2025 (Evangelos Charisis)
  - 2nd place (2): 2025, 2026 (Charis Iakovidis)
  - 3rd place (1): 2026 (Evangelos Charisis)
- International achievements / Para-archery:
  - World No. 9 junior ranking: Evangelos Charisis (2025)
  - Silver medal, Rome European Para-Archery Cup & Bronze medal, European Para-Archery Cup (2025): Dorothea Poimenidou

=== Greco-Roman Wrestling ===
- International achievements:
  - Silver medal (World Vice-Champion): 2025 World U17 Wrestling Championships (71 kg) – Dimitris Soulis
  - Gold medal: 1993 Mediterranean Games – Nikolaos Zamanis
  - Silver medal: 1990 World Junior Wrestling Championships – Nikolaos Zamanis
  - Bronze medal: 1988 European Cadet Wrestling Championships – Nikolaos Zamanis
  - Bronze medal: 1988 European Junior Wrestling Championships – Alexios Poulikidis
  - 6th place: World Junior Wrestling Championships – Konstantinos Soulis
- National titles:
  - Greek Men's Greco-Roman Team Championship: Champions
  - Greek Senior Championship (120 kg): 2013 (Matthaios Engonidis)
  - 3rd place, National Club Performance Rankings: 2024

=== Track and Field (Athletics) ===
- National Records:
  - Long jump: Kostas Koukodimos (8.09 m indoor / 8.36 m outdoor)
  - Javelin throw: Antonis Papadimitriou (79.56 m in 1987)
  - 300 m & 400 m hurdles (U18 / Scholastic): Katerina Dalaka
- National Titles & Medals:
  - Greek Indoor Champions (Pole vault): 1991 (Giannis Lefteriotis, 5.20 m)
  - 3rd place, Greek Senior Championships (100 m hurdles): 2025 (Katerina Recha, 13.93s)
- Team Distinctions:
  - 1st among non-metropolitan/provincial clubs in Greece and up to 5th overall nationally (1980s–1990s)
  - 5th place: Greek Women's Senior Track and Field Championships (1966)

=== Shooting ===
- National Record:
  - Junior women's 10m air rifle (1119/1200 in 1993: E. Gympasi, M. Faka, Ach. Kyrkou)
- Team Distinctions:
  - Consistently ranked 2nd and 3rd in the national overall club standings (1990s)

== Bibliography ==
- Collective work, Γ.Α.Σ. Αρχέλαος: 46 χρόνια - Πάντα Πρώτος [G.A.S. Archelaos: 46 Years - Always First], published by G.A.S. Archelaos Katerinis, Katerini 2002.
- Archives of local daily newspaper Olympio Vima (sports issues 1978–2026).
- Official club classification and evaluation archives of SEGAS, the Hellenic Handball Federation, and the Hellenic Wrestling Federation.
