= Greek Men's Handball Cup =

Greek Handball Cup
- Sport: Handball
- Founded: 1982
- Founder: Hellenic Handball Federation
- Country: Greece
- Most recent champion: Olympiacos (4th title)
- Most titles: Filippos Veria (6 titles)
- Broadcaster: ERT
- Domestic cups: Handball Premier; Greek Super Cup
- Website: www.handball.org.gr

The Greek Handball Cup is the second more important competition of Greek handball. The Cup is organised by the Hellenic Handball Federation (Greek: ΟΧΕ). The first Cup took place in 1982–83 season. The most successful team of the competition is Filippos Veria who have won six trophies. The current Cup holders are AEK.

== Previous winners ==
- 1983 : V.A.O.
- 1984 : V.A.O. (2)
- 1985 : Filippos Veria
- 1986 : Ionikos Nea Filadelfeia
- 1987 : Ionikos Nea Filadelfeia (2)
- 1988 : Ionikos Nea Filadelfeia (3)
- 1989 : Ionikos Nea Filadelfeia (4)
- 1990 : Archelaos Katerinis
- 1991 : Filippos Veria (2)
- 1992 : Filippos Veria (3)
- 1993 : Ionikos Nea Filadelfeia (5)
- 1994 : Archelaos Katerinis (2)
- 1995 : AS Xini
- 1996 : ESN Vrilissia
- 1997 : Athinaikos
- 1998 : ASE Douka
- 1999 : ASE Douka (2)
- 2000 : Panellinios
- 2001 : Panellinios (2)
- 2002 : Panellinios (3)
- 2003 : Filippos Veria (4)
- 2004 : GAS Kilkis
- 2005 : Athinaikos (2)
- 2006 : Athinaikos (3)
- 2007 : Filippos Veria (5)
- 2008 : ASE Douka (3)
- 2009 : AEK
- 2010 : ASE Douka (4)
- 2011 : ESN Vrilissia (2)
- 2012 : PAOK
- 2013 : AEK (2)
- 2014 : AEK (3)
- 2015 : PAOK (2)
- 2016 : Filippos Veria (6)
- 2017 : PAOK (3)
- 2018 : Olympiacos
- 2019 : Olympiacos (2)
- 2021 : AEK (4)
- 2022 : AESH Pylea
- 2023 : Olympiacos (3)
- 2024 : PAOK (4)
- 2025 : AEK (5)
- 2026 : Olympiacos (4)

== Finals ==
| Year | Winner | Score | Runner up | Stadium | Location |
|---|---|---|---|---|---|
| 1983 | V.A.O. | 19–16 | Athinaikos | Panellinios Indoor Hall | Athens |
| 1984 | V.A.O. | 21–19 | Archelaos Katerinis | Nea Smyrni Indoor Hall | Athens |
| 1985 | Filippos Veria | 20–19 | Nea Elvetia | Ilissia Indoor Hall | Athens |
| 1986 | Ionikos Nea Filadelfeia | 23–21 | ASE Douka | Ilissia Indoor Hall | Athens |
| 1987 | Ionikos Nea Filadelfeia | 31–20 | ASE Douka | Ilissia Indoor Hall | Athens |
| 1988 | Ionikos Nea Filadelfeia | 23–19 | Athinaikos | Ilissia Indoor Hall | Athens |
| 1989 | Ionikos Nea Filadelfeia | 20–19 | Filippos Veria | Mets Indoor Hall | Athens |
| 1990 | Archelaos Katerinis | 27–21 | ASE Douka | Mets Indoor Hall | Athens |
| 1991 | Filippos Veria | 30–23 | ESN Vrilissia | Mets Indoor Hall | Athens |
| 1992 | Filippos Veria | 28–24 | GE Veria | Makrochori Municipal Indoor Hall | Veria |
| 1993 | Ionikos Nea Filadelfeia | 34–33 overtime (regular time 30–30) | Archelaos Katerinis | Vyronas Indoor Hall | Athens |
| 1994 | Archelaos Katerinis | 27–25 | Ionikos Nea Filadelfeia | Mikra National Gym | Thessaloniki |
| 1995 | AS Xini | 30–29 overtime (regular time 22–22, 1st overtime 26–26) | Filippos Veria | Ilissia Indoor Hall | Athens |
| 1996 | ESN Vrilissia | 22–21 | Archelaos Katerinis | Neapoli Indoor Hall | Thessaloniki |
| 1997 | Athinaikos | 26–24 | AS Xini | Mets Indoor Hall | Athens |
| 1998 | ASE Douka | 29–25 overtime (regular time 23–23) | Athinaikos | Ilissia Indoor Hall | Athens |
| 1999 | ASE Douka | 21–18 | GAS Kilkis | Kilkis Arena | Kilkis |
| 2000 | Panellinios | 24–18 | Archelaos Katerinis | Agia Varvara Indoor Arena | Athens |
| 2001 | Panellinios | 20–16 | Ionikos Nea Filadelfeia | Loutraki Municipal Indoor Hall | Loutraki |
| 2002 | Panellinios | 20–17 | Ionikos Nea Filadelfeia | Kerkyra Indoor Hall | Corfu |
| 2003 | Filippos Veria | 32–31 overtime (regular time 25–25, 1st overtime 29–29) | Ionikos Nea Filadelfeia | Ilioupoli Indoor Hall | Athens |
| 2004 | GAS Kilkis | 29–27 | ASE Douka | Dimitris Tofalos Arena | Patras |
| 2005 | Athinaikos | 25–19 | GAS Kilkis | Katerini Indoor Hall | Katerini |
| 2006 | Athinaikos | 26–24 | Panellinios | Kerkyra Indoor Hall | Corfu |
| 2007 | Filippos Veria | 29–26 | Panellinios | Mets Indoor Hall | Athens |
| 2008 | ASE Douka | 25–24 | Panellinios | Makrochori Municipal Indoor Hall | Veria |
| 2009 | AEK | 33–31 overtime (regular time 27–27, 1st overtime 30–30) | Filippos Veria | Serres Indoor Arena | Serres |
| 2010 (Note: The first semifinal between AEK and PAOK was interrupted because of riots in the stadium. The F4 was scheduled originally at Lamia. So the winner came out by second semifinal, after 4 months.) | ASE Douka | 26–23 | ESN Vrilissia | Vyronas Indoor Hall | Athens |
| 2011 | ESN Vrilissia | 19–18 | AEK | Kladissos Arena | Chania |
| 2012 | PAOK | 25–24 | AEK | Dimitris Tofalos Arena | Patras |
| 2013 | AEK | 27–23 | PAOK | Kerkyra Indoor Hall | Corfu |
| 2014 | AEK | 18–16 | Diomidis Argous | Ano Liosia Olympic Hall | Athens |
| 2015 | PAOK | 29–27 | AEK | PAOK Sports Arena | Thessaloniki |
| 2016 | Filippos Veria | 21–19 | ASE Douka | Loutraki Municipal Indoor Hall | Loutraki |
| 2017 | PAOK | 25–23 | Panellinios | Lefkovrisi Indoor Hall | Kozani |
| 2018 | Olympiacos Piraeus | 26–22 | ASE Douka | Glyfada Indoor Hall | Athens |
| 2019 | Olympiacos Piraeus | 23–13 (Note: AEK's 13 points in this game were the fewest scored in a final by the losing team.) | AEK | Koukouli Indoor Hall | Patras |
| 2020 | Cancelled (Note: The two teams that reached the final were AEK and Diomidis Argous. The final was never held due to the COVID-19 pandemic.) | | | | |
| 2021 | AEK | 24–22 | PAOK | Lefkovrisi Indoor Hall | Kozani |
| 2022 | AESH Pylea | 21–20 | AEK | Lefkovrisi Indoor Hall | Kozani |
| 2023 | Olympiacos Piraeus | 28–27 overtime (regular time 22–22) | ASE Douka | Nafplio Indoor Hall | Nafplio |
| 2024 | PAOK | 21–20 | Drama 86 | Chalkida Indoor Hall | Chalkida |
| 2025 | AEK | 43–21 (Note: AEK's 43 points in this game were the most scored in a final by the winning team.) | ESN Vrilissia | SUNEL Arena | Athens |
| 2026 | Olympiacos Piraeus | 33–29 | AEK | Kamatero Indoor Hall | Athens |

== Performances ==
=== By club ===
A total of 14 clubs have won the Greek Cup and 18 clubs have reached the Final.

| Club | Cups | Winning years | Finalist |
|---|---|---|---|
| Filippos Veria | 6 | 1985, 1991, 1992, 2003, 2007, 2016 | 3 |
| AEK | 5 | 2009, 2013, 2014, 2021, 2025 | 7* |
| Ionikos Nea Filadelfeia | 5 | 1986, 1987, 1988, 1989, 1993 | 4 |
| ASE Douka | 4 | 1998, 1999, 2008, 2010 | 7 |
| PAOK | 4 | 2012, 2015, 2017, 2024 | 2 |
| Olympiacos | 4 | 2018, 2019, 2023, 2026 | – |
| Panellinios | 3 | 2000, 2001, 2002 | 4 |
| Athinaikos | 3 | 1997, 2005, 2006 | 3 |
| Archelaos Katerinis | 2 | 1990, 1994 | 4 |
| ESN Vrilissia | 2 | 1996, 2011 | 3 |
| V.A.O. | 2 | 1983, 1984 | – |
| GAS Kilkis | 1 | 2004 | 2 |
| AS Xini | 1 | 1995 | 1 |
| AESH Pylea | 1 | 2022 | – |
| Diomidis Argous | | | 2* |
| Nea Elvetia | | | 1 |
| GE Veria | | | 1 |
| Drama 86 | | | 1 |

- AEK and Diomidis Argous both qualified for the 2020 Greek Cup Final which was eventually cancelled due to COVID-19 pandemic.

=== By city ===
Fourteen clubs from six cities have won the Cup.

| City (No of teams) | Number of Titles | Clubs |
|---|---|---|
| Athens (7) | 23 | Ionikos Nea Filadelfeia (5); AEK (5); ASE Douka (4); Panellinios (3); Athinaikos (3); ESN Vrilissia (2); AS Xini (1) |
| Thessaloniki (3) | 7 | PAOK (4); V.A.O. (2); AESH Pylea (1) |
| Veria (1) | 6 | Filippos Veria (6) |
| Piraeus (1) | 4 | Olympiacos (4) |
| Katerini (1) | 2 | Archelaos Katerinis (2) |
| Kilkis (1) | 1 | GAS Kilkis (1) |
