= Ioannis Sidiropoulos =

Greek weightlifter (born 1956)

Personal information
- Nationality: Greek
- Born: 1 September 1956 (age 68)

Sport
- Sport: Weightlifting

Ioannis Sidiropoulos (born 1 September 1956) is a Greek weightlifter. He competed at the 1980 Summer Olympics and the 1988 Summer Olympics.
