= AC Diomidis Argous =

Greek handball club

AO Diomidis Argous
- Full name: Athlitikós Ómilos Diomidis Argous Handball Club
- Nickname: Wolves
- Short name: Diomidis
- Founded: 1984; 42 years ago
- Arena: Nea Kios Indoor Sports Hall, Nea Kios
- Capacity: 600
- Head coach: Georgios Zaravinas
- League: Handball Premier
- Club colours
Home	Away

AO Diomidis Argous (Greek: Αθλητικός Όμιλος Διομήδης Άργους) is a Greek handball team based in Argos, that plays in the Handball Premier.

Location of AO Diomidis Argous

== History ==
The club was founded in 1976. The handball department was founded in the club in 1984. The team was named after Diomedes, the former king of the city of Argos, who became famous in the Trojan War. The symbol of the team is the ancient wolf with the crown of King Diomedes. Popularly nicknamed the "Wolves", the team won for the first time the EHF Challenge Cup in 2012, downing in the final Wacker Thun. It was also the first time a Greek team won a European title in a handball club competition.

== Crest, colours, supporters ==
=== Kits ===
HOME
2015–18	2022–24

AWAY
2022–23	2023–24

== Team ==
=== Current squad ===
Squad for the 2023–24 season

Diomidis Argous

Goalkeepers

- 12 (Greece) (Poland) Marco-Jan Terlecki
- 16 (Greece) Georgios Xatzikonstantinou
- 88 (Greece) Filippos Nikolintais

Left Wingers

- 2 (Greece) Dimitrios Kostoulas
- 7 (Greece) Panagiotis Tselios
- 22 (Greece) Panteleimon Kostakidis

Right Wingers

- 20 (Greece) Garyfalos Bagios
- 99 (Greece) Ioannis Stefanitsis

Line Players

- 28 (Greece) Vasileios Manthos
- 30 (Serbia) Dušan Vukadinović
- 31 (Greece) Ioannis-Alexios Mpekiaris

Left Backs

- 5 (Greece) Eleytherios Anastasiou
- 6 (Greece) Orfeas Tsakalos
- 67 (Greece) Antonios Karkagelis

Central Backs

- 13 (Greece) Christoforos Tsakouridis
- 55 (Greece) Periklis Orfanos

Right Backs

- 15 (Greece) Stylianos Asvestas
- 77 (Greece) Charalampos Mpaltatzis

=== Technical staff ===
- Head coach: (Greece) Georgios Zaravinas
- Assistant coach: (Greece) Andreas Vassilopoulos
- Physiotherapist: (Greece) Georgios Sideris

=== Transfers ===
Transfers for the 2025–26 season

Joining

Leaving

- (Egypt) Omar Salem (CB) to (Greece) AEK Athens
- (Greece) Christoforos Tsakouridis (CB) to (Austria) BT Füchse
- (Greece) (Poland) Marko-Jan Terlecki (GK) to (Czech Republic) SKKP Handball Brno
- (Greece) Vasileios Manthos (LP) to (Greece) Olympiacos

=== Transfer History ===
Transfers for the 2023–24 season

Joining

- (Serbia) Dušan Vukadinović (LP) from (Serbia) RK Proleter Zrenjanin
- (Egypt) Omar Salem (CB) from (Egypt) Aviation Sporting Club
- (Greece) Panagiotis Tselios (LW) from (Greece) Aeropos Edessas
- (Greece) Panteleimon Kostakidis (LW) from (Greece) Aeropos Edessas
- (Greece) Christoforos Tsakouridis (CB) from (Greece) A.C. Doukas School
- (Greece) Garyfalos Bagios (RW) from (Greece) Olympiacos
- (Greece) Filippos Nikolintais (GK) from (Greece) Ionikos Nea Filadelfeia

Leaving

- (Algeria) Sofiane Bendjilali (LP) to (France) Valence Handball
- (Montenegro) Goran Andjelic (GK) to (Bosnia and Herzegovina) RK Sloboda Tuzla
- (Greece) Grigorios Tzimpoulas (LW) to (Greece) Olympiacos
- (Greece) Christos Tsigaridas (CB) to (Greece) Olympiacos

== Previous squads ==
2011–2012 Team
Shirt No	Nationality	Player	Birth Date	Position
1	Greece	Ilias Tsoulos	22 November 1988 (age 37)	Goalkeeper
2	Greece	Georgios Zaravinas	13 June 1976 (age 50)	Left Winger
4	Greece	Nikolaos Roumeliotis	19 February 1986 (age 40)	Right Winger
5	Greece	Theodoros Megaloikonomu	18 August 1983 (age 43)	Central Back
7	Greece	Eleftherios Kremastiotis	18 March 1994 (age 32)	Left Winger
8	Greece	Nikolaos Passias	17 February 1995 (age 31)	Left Back
9	Greece	Christos Priobolos	26 June 1978 (age 48)	Left Back
10	Serbia	Duro Mujić	1 June 1992 (age 34)	Left Back
11	Greece	Charalampos Mallios	6 August 1987 (age 39)	Central Back
12	Cyprus	Christophoros Nungovitch	14 December 1989 (age 36)	Goalkeeper
13	Greece	Raqi Marango	1 January 1983 (age 43)	Line Player
17	Greece	Nikolaos Samaras	5 August 1978 (age 48)	Right Winger
18	Greece	Fotis Kontoulis	24 October 1991 (age 34)	Central Back
19	Greece	Evangelos Spentzos	9 May 1995 (age 31)	Right Winger
21	Greece	Ioannidis Eleftherios	5 May 1992 (age 34)	Left Winger
77	Serbia	Milan Urošević	22 May 1985 (age 41)	Right Back
99	Serbia	Davor Tasković	16 January 1986 (age 40)	Left Back

== Achievements ==
EHF Challenge Cup

- Winners (1): 2011/12

Greek Championships

- Winners (2): 2011/12, 2013/14
- Runners-up (3): 2012/13, 2014/15, 2015/16

Greek Cup

- Runners-up (2): 2013/14, 2019/20

== European record ==
=== EHF Challenge Cup ===
Season	Round	Club	Home	Away	Aggregate
2011–12; Winners	Round 3	(Poland) SPR Stal Mielec	30–26	27–28	57–54
2011–12; Winners	Round 4	(Ukraine) Portovik Yuzhny	27–24	26–29	53–53 (a)
2011–12; Winners	Quarter-finals	(Switzerland) HC Kriens-Luzern	25–21	28–28	53–49
2011–12; Winners	Semi-finals	(Israel) Maccabi Tel Aviv	21–21	29–26	50–47
2011–12; Winners	Finals	(Switzerland) Wacker Thun	26–23	20–22	46–45

=== EHF ranking ===
As of 6/12/2023

Rank	Team	Points
138	(Poland) SPR Chrobry Głogów	34
139	(North Macedonia) RK Metalurg Skopje	34
140	(Sweden) HK Malmö	34
141	(Greece) Diomidis Argous	33
142	(Bosnia and Herzegovina) RK Borac Banja Luka	33
143	(Luxembourg) Handball Club Berchem	32
144	(Netherlands) RKHV Volendam	32

== Former club members ==
=== Notable former players ===
- (Greece) Charalampos Mallios (2010–2012, 2013–2014, 2021–2023)
- (Greece) Nikolaos Samaras (2009–2017)
- (Greece) Georgios Zaravinas (2010–2014)
- (Algeria) Sofiane Bendjilali (2022–2023)
- (Bosnia and Herzegovina) (Germany) Sven Suton (2017–2018)
- (Cyprus) Christophoros Nungovitch (2011–2015)
- (Serbia) Đorđe Golubović (2020–2021)
- (Ukraine) Olexandr Shevelev (2020–2022)
