= G.N.O. Aris Nikaias =

Aris Nikaias Άρης Νικαίας
- Full name: Gymnastikos Athlitikos Omilos Aris Nikaias; Γυμναστικός Αθλητικός Όμιλος Άρης Νικαίας
- Founded: 1973
- Team history: 1973-present
- Colours: yellow, blue
- Titles: 4 Women's Handball Championships
- Website: http://www.arisnikeas.com/

Aris Nikaias (full name Gymnastikos Athlitikos Omilos Aris Nikaias/ G.N.O. Aris Nikaias Greek: Γυμναστικός Αθλητικός Όμιλος Άρης Νικαιάς/Γ.Ν.Ο. Άρης Νικαίας) is a Greek multi-sport club based in Nikaia, Piraeus. The club was founded in 1973, when members of the club were detached from the nearby Ionikos. The club has divisions for many different sports. It has won four straight women's handball championships. Its logo is a star, and its colors are yellow and blue.

== Departments ==
Team sports

- Basketball team, the basketball team plays in Greek C Basketball League (2015–16)
- Handball team, the handball team plays in Handball Premier (2026–27)
- Volleyball team
- Water polo team

The club has also departments in various individual sports.

== History ==
Aris Nikaias was founded in 1973 by former members of Ionikos Nikaias. The club acquired departments in various sports. The most successful were the basketball, volleyball, and handball. The first achievements came from the women's handball department. Aris Nikaias won 4 consecutive women's championships between 1982 and 1985. The volleyball team achieved to reach in A1 Ethniki in 2000, winning the A2 Ethniki Volleyball championship of the season 1999-2000. Recently the basketball team promoted to Greek C Basketball League. This year, the handball and the basketball team play in national divisions, the basketball team in C League (4th-tier) and handball team in Handball Premier (1st-tier).

== Honours ==
- Greek Women's Handball Championship
  - Winner (4): 1982, 1983, 1984, 1985
