= HANTH =

Christian youth development organisation in Thessaloniki

H.A.N.TH.
- Full name: Young Men's Christian Association Thessaloniki
- Founded: 1921; 104 years ago
- Colours: Blue; Red
- Website: ymca.gr

H.A.N.TH. (Young Men's Christian Association Thessaloniki, Χριστιανική Αδελφότης Νέων Θεσσαλονίκης) (Greek: Χ.Α.Ν.Θ.), or H.A.N. Thessalonikis (Χ.Α.Ν. Θεσσαλονίκης), is a Christian youth development organisation that is based in Thessaloniki, Greece, which comprises the homonymous Greek multi-sport club. The multi-sports club was founded in 1921, and has teams in basketball (founded 1919), volleyball, handball, water polo, and others sports. HAN Thessaloniki is a part of the YMCA in Thessaloniki, which is a Christian universal welfare movement. The full name of the club is Christianiki Adelfotita Neon Thessalonikis (CHANTH) – which is commonly abbreviated as either HANTH or HANTh (Χριστιανική Αδελφότητα Νέων Θεσσαλονίκης (ΧΑΝΘ)).

Historically, the most successful sports department of HANTH has been the men's basketball team. In recent years, the club's most successful teams are the volleyball and handball teams, which have played in the higher level Greek national championships in their respective sports.

== History ==
HAN Thessaloniki was the first team which imported the sport of basketball into Greece. HANTH organised the first unofficial regional basketball championship of Thessaloniki in 1924, with the participation of HANTH, Aris Thessaloniki, Iraklis Thessaloniki, Armenian Union, VAO, Maccabi Thessaloniki, and Akoah. They also organised the first unofficial Panhellenic Basketball Championship in 1926, with the presence of HANTH, Aris, PAOK, Iraklis, and AEK Athens. Since the beginning of the official Panhellenic Basketball Championship, HANTH has managed be the championship's finalist one time, in 1930.

HANTH was also active in the sport of volleyball from its first years. It organised the first regional volleyball championship of Thessaloniki in 1923, and a new championship in 1924, with the presence of HANTH, Iraklis, Aris, Sportive Etoile, Byron, American School, and Nouka School.

HAN Thessaloniki was also one of the first sports clubs to create a handball team in Greece. The handball team of HAN Thessaloniki was founded in 1979, almost simultaneously with the beginning of the first Greek Handball Championship, which the team has also competed in.

Over the years, the HANTH sports club has featured Greek athletes such as Georgia Abatzidou, who competed in marathon running, and Nikos Iliadis and Giannis Sidiropoulos, who competed in Olympic weightlifting.

== Departments ==
- Men's Basketball Club
- Men's Volleyball Club
- Women's Volleyball Club
- Men's Handball Club
- Men's Water Polo Club
- Athletics (Men's)
- Athletics (Women's):
  - 5× Panhellenic Women's Marathon Champion: (2001, 2002, 2003, 2004, 2005)
- Swimming
- Wrestling:
  - 11× Panhellenic Men's Freestyle Wrestling Champion: (1960, 1961, 1962, 1963, 1964, 1965, 1967, 1968, 1969, 1970, 1971)
  - 2× Greek Freestyle Wrestling Cup Winner: (1996, 1997)
- Judo:
  - 4× Panhellenic Men's Judo Champion: (1977, 1978, 1979, 1980)
- Tae Kwon Do
- Weightlifting:
  - 12× Panhellenic Men's Weightlifting Champion (1970, 1971, 1973, 1974, 1976, 1977, 1978, 1979, 1981, 1982, 1983)
- Sailing
- Table tennis (Men's)
- Table tennis (Women's)
- Chess

== Sports facilities ==
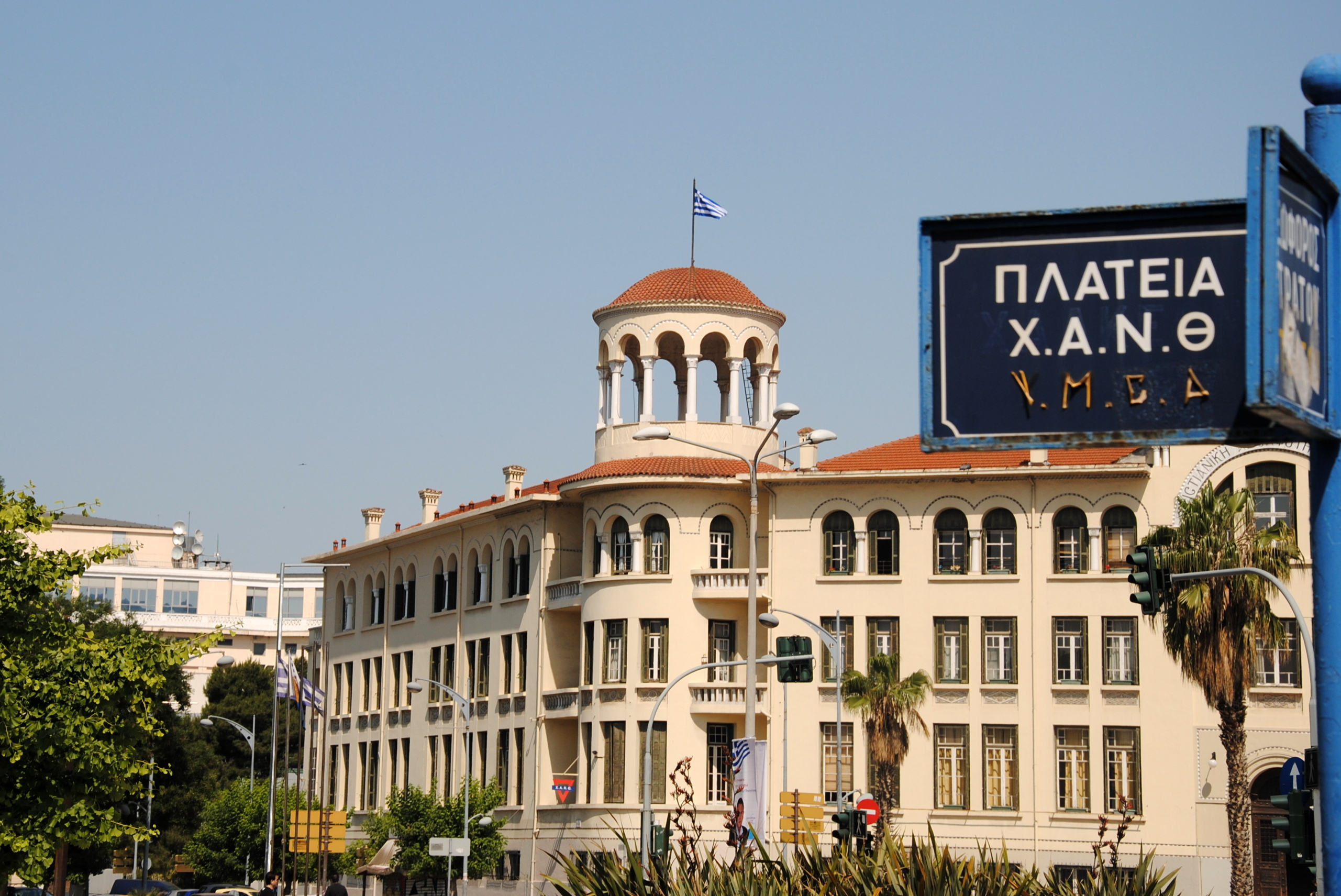
The YMCA building in Thessaloniki.

The sport facilities of HAN Thessaloniki are located in the centre of Thessaloniki, near the White Tower. In 1923, the first basketball court of HANTH was built. It was an open air court, that hosted important sporting events in Thessaloniki. In 1934, the classic indoor sports building of HANTH was completed, and the sports activities of the club moved there. In the early 2000s, the open basketball court was demolished, and a new indoor basketball hall, the Y.M.C.A. New Sports Center, was built, with a capacity of 1,500 spectators. In 2013, HANTH founded the first basketball museum in Greece.
