= GAS Kilkis =

Greek handball club

G.A.S. Kilkis
- Full name: Γυμναστικός Αθλητικός Σύλλογος Κιλκίς; (Kilkis Gymnastic Athletic Club)
- Founded: 1980
- Arena: Kilkis Arena
- Capacity: 1,500
- League: Handball Premier
- 2024–25: Handball Premier, 10th
Home	Away

G.A.S. Kilkis (Greek: Γυμναστικός Αθλητικός Σύλλογος Κιλκίς, lit. 'Kilkis Gymnastic Athletic Club') is a Greek handball and beach handball club based in Kilkis. It was founded in 1980 and has played in A1 ethniki (first-tier division) many consecutive years. It has won one cup, in 2004. The home arena of the club is the municipal gymnasium of Kilkis and the club's colours are blue and red.

== History ==
G.A.S. Kilkis was founded in 1980. Few year later it promoted to A1 Ethniki and the 1993–94 season played in the final of the championship. Overall, GAS Kilkis has played three times in the finals of the championship and ranked in 2nd place, the years 1994, 2000 and 2008. It has won one Greek cup in 2004 and even two times it was a Greek cup finalist. The previous season, GAS Kilkis, which had been demoted to A2 Ethniki, placed 11th overall. The club has also youth teams, two of them, the Men's U-16 team and women U-16 team have won the championship in 1990.

The beach handball team has won the Men's European Beach Tour Finals 2016.

=== Recent seasons ===
Season	Division	Place	Notes
1993–94	A1 Ethniki	2nd	
1998–99	A1 Ethniki	3rd	Finalist Greek Cup
1999–00	A1 Ethniki	2nd	
2001–02	A1 Ethniki	4th	
2002–03	A1 Ethniki	5th	
2003–04	A1 Ethniki	5th	Winner Greek Cup
2004–05	A1 Ethniki	4th	Finalist Greek Cup
2005–06	A1 Ethniki	6th	
2006–07	A1 Ethniki	3rd	
2007–08	A1 Ethniki	2nd	
2008–09	A1 Ethniki	8th	
2009–10	A1 Ethniki	11th	Relegated to A2
2010–11	A2 Ethniki	1st	Promoted to A1
2011–12	A1 Ethniki	7th	
2012–13	A1 Ethniki	5th	
2013–14	A1 Ethniki	5th	
2014–15	A1 Ethniki	11th	Relegated to A2
2015–16	A2 Ethniki	6th	
2016–17	A2 Ethniki	7th	
2017–18	A2 Ethniki	3rd	
2018–19	A2 Ethniki	2nd	
2019–20	A2 Ethniki	6th	
2020–21	A2 Ethniki	2nd	
2021–22	A2 Ethniki	3rd	
2022–23	A2 Ethniki	1st	Promoted to Handball Premier
2023-24	Handball Premier	10th	
2024-25	Handball Premier	10th	
2025-26	Handball Premier	-	Greek Cup Final 4

== Honours ==
=== National ===
- Greek Handball Cup
  - Winner (1): 2004
  - Finalist (2): 1999, 2005
  - Final-4 (1): 2026
- Greek Handball Championship
  - Finalist (3): 1994, 2000, 2008

=== European ===
- European Beach Tour Finals:
  - Winner (1): 2016
