= Filippos Veria =

Greek sport club

A.C. Filippos Verias
- Full name: Athletic Club Filippos Verias (Greek: Αθλητικός Σύλλογος Φίλιππος Βέροιας)
- Founded: 1962
- Colours: Red and White
- Chairman: Giorgos Faiakas
- Website: Club home page

A.C. Filippos Verias (Greek: Α.Σ. Φίλιππος Βέροιας) is a Greek sport club based in Veria. It has departments in Basketball, Volleyball, Handball, Gymnastics, and Athletics. The most successful is the department of Handball that has won many titles. Filippos was founded in 1962 and its colours are white and red. Its emblem is Philip of Macedonia. Filippos is also known as "Vasilias (the king)" and it is the second most successful club in Premier Handball/A1 Ethniki history.

== Basketball team ==
Filippos Verias' senior men's basketball team was founded in 1962. In the 2013–14 season, the club played in the Greek 2nd Division (A2 National), for the first time. In the previous years, the club played mostly in the Greek 3rd Division (B National), and in the Greek C League (C National) (the third and fourth divisions of the Greek basketball league system).

== Handball team ==
Filippos Veria Handball Club was founded in 1977, and is the most successful department of the club having won many championships and cups. The club has won 9 Championships and 6 Cups, and he played in the final of EHF Challenge Cup but it was defeated by Danish team Skjern Håndbold. It was the first Greek handball club that played in a final of a European competition. Filippos currently plays in Handball Premier (first division).

== Volleyball team ==
The volleyball department of Filippos Verias promoted to A1 Ethniki Volleyball for first time in 2020. In 2021, Filippos reached the final of League Cup defeating PAOK at the semi-final, but losing by 3–1 sets from Foinikas Syros at the final.

== See also ==
- Filippos Veria H.C.
- Filippos Verias B.C.
- Veria F.C.
- GE Verias
