= GE Verias =

Greek sports club

Gymnastiki Enosi Verias was a Greek sports club from Veria. It was active in athletics, boxing, chess, handball, table tennis, volleyball and weightlifting, but it is best known for the handball section. The women's team won six national championships and seven national cups between 1987 and 1996 including five doubles in a row, appearing regularly in IHF/EHF competitions until 1998, and the men's team were also national champions in 1997. They also reached the national cup's final in 1992, but lost to local rivals Filippos Veria.

== Titles ==
=== Women ===
- Greek Championship (6)
  - 1988, 1989, 1990, 1991, 1992, 1993
- Greek Cup (7)
  - 1987, 1989, 1990, 1992, 1992, 1993

=== Men ===
- Greek Championship (1)
  - 1997

== See also ==
- Veria F.C.
- Filippos Veria
