= ESN Vrilissia =

Greek handball club

- Full name: Ekpolitistikos Syllogos Neon Vrilission; Εκπολιτιστικός Σύλλογος Νέων Βριλισσίων
- Founded: 1979
- Arena: Vrilissia, North Athens
- League: A2

ESN Vrilissia or ESN Vrilission (Greek: ΕΣΝ Βριλισσίων) is a Handball club that based in Vrilissia in the regional unit of North Athens, Attica. The full name of club is Ekpolitistikos Syllogos Neon Vrilission (Greek: Εκπολιτιστικός Σύλλογος Νέων Βριλισσίων) that means Cultural Youth Association Vrilissia. The club was founded in 1979 and has won one Greek Championship and two Cups. In September 2011 the group was withdrawn by the first division championship (A1 Ethniki) because of financial difficulties. In current season the club plays in A2 Ethniki (second division).

== Current Seasons ==
Season	Division	Place	Notes
1990–91	A1 Ethniki	-?-	Finalist Greek Cup
1994–95	A1 Ethniki	3rd	
1995–96	A1 Ethniki	1st	Winner Greek Cup
1996–97	A1 Ethniki	3rd	
2001–02	A1 Ethniki	12th	Relegated to A2
2004–05	A2 Ethniki	-?-	Promoted to A1
2005–06	A1 Ethniki	7th	
2006–07	A1 Ethniki	8th	
2007–08	A1 Ethniki	10th	
2008–09	A1 Ethniki	10th	
2009–10	A1 Ethniki	6th	Finalist Greek Cup
2010–11	A1 Ethniki	6th	Winner Greek Cup
2011–12	A1 Ethniki	12th	Relegated to A2
2012–13	A2 Ethniki	7th	
2013–14	A2 Ethniki	6th	

== Honours and achievements ==
- Greek Championship
  - Winner (1): 1996
- Greek Cup
  - Winner (2): 1996, 2011
