= DIKE.AS. Nea Ionia =

Greek handball club

- Full name: Dikefalos Asteras Nea Ionia (Greek: Δικέφαλος Αστέρας Νέας Ιωνίας)
- Founded: 2004
- Dissolved: 2017 (replaced by Olympiacos)
- Arena: Neas Ionias Indoor Hall
- League: A1
- 2016–17: 1st

DI.KEAS. Neas Ionias (full name Dikefalos Asteras Neas Ionias) was a Greek club based in the suburban town of Nea Ionia, which is a part of the Athens urban area. It was founded in 2004 and it plays in A1 Ethniki handball (first-tier). The recent years, the club was named IEK Xini Dikeas after its sponsor, IEK Xini Schools. The club’s colours are red and black and the arena of the club is Neas Ionias Indoor Hall, near Pefkakia train station. The club won the championship of the 2016–17 season. This was the last season of the club because subsequently it was replaced by Olympiacos Piraeus, since it was bought by it.

== History ==
DIKEAS was founded in 2004. In 2013 the club finished in the first place of Beta Ethniki championship (third-tier) and promoted to A2 Ethniki. The next season, Dikeas finished again in first place and promoted to A1 Ethniki. Its first season in A1 Ethniki it finished in 6th place. In season 2016–17 DICEAS won the Greek championship for first time at its history. Subsequently the club merged with Olympiacos and was replaced by it in the handball championship.

=== Recent seasons ===
Season	Division	Place	Notes
2012–13	Beta Ethniki	1st	Promoted to A2
2013–14	A2 Ethniki	1st	Promoted to A1
2014–15	A1 Ethniki	6th	
2015–16	A1 Ethniki	4th	
2016–17	A1 Ethniki	1st	

== Honours ==
- Greek Men's Handball Championship
  - Winner (1): 2017

== European record ==
Season	Competition	Round	Club	1st leg	2nd leg	Aggregate
2016–17	Challenge Cup	R3	(Greece) A.C. Doukas	27–21	16–24	43–45
