= Ionikos Nea Filadelfeia H.C. =

Greek handball club

Ionikos Nea Filadelfeia
- Full name: A.S. Ionikos Nea Filadelfeia
- Founded: 1930; 95 years ago
- Arena: Ionikos Nea Filadelfeia Indoor Arena "Zacharias Alexandrou"
- Capacity: 1,500
- League: Handball Premier
- Club colours

Ionikos Nea Filadelfeia (also Ionikos Nea Philadelphia) is a sport club that is based in Nea Filadelfeia, an Athenian suburb. The full name of club is A.S. Ionikos Nea Filadelfeia (Greek: Α. Σ. Ιωνικός Νέας Φιλαδέλφειας). The Handball club that plays in the Handball Premier.

== History ==
The handball department of Ionikos is the most successful team of the club. Ionikos has got fifteen domestic titles (ten championships and five cups). In season 2010-11 Ionikos relegated in A2 Category. In recent season (2014–15), it finished in 1st place in A2 Ethniki and promoted to A1. However, it was withdrawn from the championship due to financial problems and was replaced by Archelaos Katerinis.

Titles

- 10 Greek Men's Championships: 1980, 1981, 1982, 1983, 1984, 1985, 1987, 1992, 1993, 1999.
- 5 Greek Men's Cups: 1986, 1987, 1988, 1989, 1993.
- 1 Greek Men's Super Cup: 1999

=== Recent seasons ===
Season	Division	Place	Notes
2001-02	A1 Ethniki	5th	Finalist Greek Cup
2002-03	A1 Ethniki	4th	Finalist Greek Cup
2003-04	A1 Ethniki	3rd	
2004-05	A1 Ethniki	7th	
2005-06	A1 Ethniki	10th	
2006-07	A1 Ethniki	11th	
2007-08	A1 Ethniki	9th	
2008-09	A1 Ethniki	11th	Relegated to A2
2009-10	A2 Ethniki	1st	Promoted to A1
2010-11	A1 Ethniki	11th	Relegated to A2
2011-12	A2 Ethniki	5th	
2012-13	A2 Ethniki	5th	
2013-14	A2 Ethniki	3rd	
2014-15	A2 Ethniki	1st	Promoted to A1 but after it was withdrawn from the championship
