= Greek Men's Handball Championship =

Sports league

- Current season, competition or edition: 2024–25 Greek Handball Premier
- Sport: Handball
- Founded: 1979
- No. of teams: 12
- Country: Greece
- Confederation: EHF
- Most recent champion: Olympiacos Piraeus (6th) (2025–2026)
- Most titles: Ionikos Nea Filadelfeia (10 titles)
- Broadcaster: ERT
- Relegation to: A2 Ethniki Handball
- International cups: EHF European League; EHF European Cup
- Website: handball.org.gr

The Greek Men's Handball Championship, or Handball Premier, is the most important competition of Greek handball. The competition which is organised by Hellenic Handball Federation (Greek: ΟΧΕ) started in the 1979–80 season. The most successful team is Ionikos Nea Filadelfeia with ten titles. The last title (2025-26 period) was won by Olympiacos Piraeus.

Evangelos Kalfarentzos, fitness director of Panellinios Gymnastikos Syllogos (Panhellenic Gymnastic Club) of Athens, physical education teacher, and author, recognized as rapporteur of the sport in Greece.

== Competition format ==
The season begins with a tournament between the twelve teams. The top four teams advance to the play-offs to determine the champion in the usual manner. There are usually no play-offs for 3rd and 4th place. The ranking is based on the positions the teams occupied in the regular season.

== 2023/24 Season participants ==
Location of clubs for the 2023–24 Handball Premier season

The following 12 clubs compete in the Handball Premier during the 2023–24 season.

| Team | City | Arena |
|---|---|---|
| AEK | Athens | G. Kassimatis Indoor Hall |
| Aeropos Edessa | Edessa | Edessa Indoor Hall |
| AESH Pylaia | Thessaloniki | Mikra Indoor Arena III |
| ASE Douka | Athens | Dais Indoor Hall |
| Diomidis Argous | Argos | Nea Kios Indoor Hall |
| Drama 86 | Drama | Dimitris Krachtidis Indoor Hall |
| GAS Kilkis | Kilkis | Kilkis Indoor Arena |
| Ionikos Nea Filadelfeia | Athens | Zacharias Alexandrou Indoor Hall |
| Olympiacos | Piraeus | Ilioupoli Indoor Hall |
| Panellinios | Athens | Panellinios Indoor Hall |
| PAOK | Thessaloniki | Mikra Indoor Arena III |
| Zafeirakis Naousa | Naousa | Naousa Indoor Hall |

== Previous champions ==
Panhellenic Championship (1979–80 to 1981–82)

- 1980 : Ionikos Nea Filadelfeia
- 1981 : Ionikos Nea Filadelfeia (2)
- 1982 : Ionikos Nea Filadelfeia (3)

Alpha Ethniki (1982–83 to 1988–89)

- 1983 : Ionikos Nea Filadelfeia (4)
- 1984 : Ionikos Nea Filadelfeia (5)
- 1985 : Ionikos Nea Filadelfeia (6)
- 1986 : Filippos Veria
- 1987 : Ionikos Nea Filadelfeia (7)
- 1988 : Filippos Veria (2)
- 1989 : Filippos Veria (3)

A1 Ethniki (1989–90 to 2014–15)

- 1990 : Filippos Veria
- 1991 : Filippos Veria (5)
- 1992 : Ionikos Nea Filadelfeia (8)
- 1993 : Ionikos Nea Filadelfeia (9)
- 1994 : Filippos Veria (6)
- 1995 : Filippos Veria (7)
- 1996 : ESN Vrilissia
- 1997 : GE Veria
- 1998 : ASE Douka
- 1999 : Ionikos Nea Filadelfeia (10)
- 2000 : Panellinios
- 2001 : ASE Douka (2)
- 2002 : Panellinios (2)
- 2003 : Filippos Veria (8)
- 2004 : Panellinios (3)
- 2005 : Athinaikos
- 2006 : Panellinios (4)
- 2007 : Panellinios (5)
- 2008 : ASE Douka (3)
- 2009 : PAOK
- 2010 : PAOK (2)
- 2011 : AEK
- 2012 : Diomidis Argous
- 2013 : AEK (2)
- 2014 : Diomidis Argous (2)
- 2015 : PAOK (3)

Handball Premier (2015–16 to present)

- 2016 : Filippos Veria (9)
- 2017 : IEK Xini DIKEAS
- 2018 : Olympiacos Piraeus
- 2019 : Olympiacos Piraeus (2)
- 2020 : AEK (3)
- 2021 : AEK (4)
- 2022 : Olympiacos Piraeus (3)
- 2023 : AEK (5)
- 2024 : Olympiacos Piraeus (4)
- 2025 : Olympiacos Piraeus (5)
- 2026 : Olympiacos Piraeus (6)

== Performances ==
=== By club ===
| Club | Titles | Seasons |
|---|---|---|
| Ionikos Nea Filadelfeia | 10 | 1980, 1981, 1982, 1983, 1984, 1985, 1987, 1992, 1993, 1999 |
| Filippos Veria | 9 | 1986, 1988, 1989, 1990, 1991, 1994, 1995, 2003, 2016 |
| Olympiacos Piraeus | 6 | 2018, 2019, 2022, 2024, 2025, 2026 |
| AEK | 5 | 2011, 2013, 2020, 2021, 2023 |
| Panellinios | 5 | 2000, 2002, 2004, 2006, 2007 |
| ASE Douka | 3 | 1998, 2001, 2008 |
| PAOK | 3 | 2009, 2010, 2015 |
| Diomidis Argous | 2 | 2012, 2014 |
| ESN Vrilissia | 1 | 1996 |
| GE Veria | 1 | 1997 |
| Athinaikos | 1 | 2005 |
| DIKEAS Nea Ionia | 1 | 2017 |

=== By city ===
Twelve clubs from five cities have won the championship.

| City | Number of Titles | Clubs |
|---|---|---|
| Athens (7) | 26 | Ionikos Nea Filadelfeia (10); Panellinios (5); AEK (5); ASE Douka (3); ESN Vrilissia (1); Athinaikos (1); DIKEAS Nea Ionia (1) |
| Veria (2) | 10 | Filippos Veria (9); GE Veria (1) |
| Piraeus (1) | 6 | Olympiacos Piraeus (6) |
| Thessaloniki (1) | 3 | PAOK (3) |
| Argos (1) | 2 | Diomidis Argous (2) |

== EHF coefficient ranking ==
| Countries club place distribution for 2025–26 EHF European competitions: 1. (Norway) REMA 1000-ligaen (47.67) — 0 CL/ 0 EHF League / 4 EHF Cup; 2. (Serbia) Arkus Liga (36.00) — 0 CL/ 0 EHF League / 4 EHF Cup; 3. (Greece) Handball Premier (33.67) — 0 CL/ 0 EHF League / 4 EHF Cup; 4. (Czech Republic) Chance Extraliga (28.00) — 0 CL/ 0 EHF League / 4 EHF Cup; 5. (Belarus) Belarusian First League (28.00*) — 0 CL/ 0 EHF League / 4 EHF Cup | EHF Club Ranking, as of 25 May 2026: 30. Olympiacos Piraeus (170p); 46. AEK Athens (127p); 62. Diomidis Argous (84p); 92. PAOK (53p); 100. Drama 1986 (50p); 209. ESN Vrilissia (9p); 222. AESH Pylaia (8p) |

== Greek handball clubs in European competitions ==
EHF Cup Winners' Cup:

| Team | Winner | Runner-up | Semifinals |
|---|---|---|---|
| Filippos Veria | | | 1993 |

EHF European Cup:

| Team | Winner | Runner-up | Semifinals |
|---|---|---|---|
| AEK | 2021 | 2018, 2025 | 2019 |
| Diomidis Argous | 2012 | | |
| Filippos Veria | | 2003 | |
| Olympiacos Piraeus | | 2024 | |

== Sources ==
- Hellenic Handball Federation, Champions
