= A.C. Doukas School =

Greek handball Club

- Full name: Athletic Club of Doukas School; Αθλητικός Σύλλογος Εκπαιδευτηρίων Δούκα
- Founded: 1979
- Colours: Blue and White
- Chairman: Ioannis Doukas
- Titles: 14
- Website: Club home page

A.C. Doukas School (Greek: Αθλητικός Σύλλογος Εκπαιδευτηρίων Δούκα/Α.Σ.Ε.Δ.) is a Greek multisport club based in Marousi, Athens. It was founded in 1979 by Doukas School and its colour is blue and white. The home of the club is the Dais gymnasium in Marousi. The club has teams in Handball, Basketball, Track and Field, futsal, Badminton and Gymnastics.

== Basketball team ==
The basketball team was founded in the early 1990s. Nowadays, men's team plays in Beta Ethniki (third-tier level). The most successful era of the club history was the period 2003–2007, when the club played in A2 category (second-tier level).

== Handball team ==
The handball team is the most successful team of the club having won many championships and cups of both men's and women's. Men's team has won 3 championship and 4 cup and women's team has won 1 championship and 1 cup. Men's Doukas team plays in A1 Ethniki (first division). In current season it finished in seventh place and the previous year it had finished in third place.

=== Men's team recent seasons ===
Season	Division	Place	Notes
1985–86	A1 Ethniki	3rd	Finalist Greek Cup
1986–87	A1 Ethniki	3rd	Finalist Greek Cup
1987–88	A1 Ethniki	6th	
1988–89	A1 Ethniki	4th	
1989–90	A1 Ethniki	??	Finalist Greek Cup
1991–92	A1 Ethniki	3rd	
1993–94	A1 Ethniki	3rd	
1995–96	A1 Ethniki	3rd	
1997–98	A1 Ethniki	1st	Winner Greek Cup
1998–99	A1 Ethniki	2nd	Winner Greek Cup
1998–99	A1 Ethniki	2nd	Finalist Greek Super Cup
1999-00	A1 Ethniki	3rd	
2000–01	A1 Ethniki	1st	
2001–02	A1 Ethniki	2nd	
2002–03	A1 Ethniki	3rd	
2003–04	A1 Ethniki	6th	Finalist Greek Cup
2004–05	A1 Ethniki	6th	
2005–06	A1 Ethniki	4th	
2006–07	A1 Ethniki	6th	
2007–08	A1 Ethniki	1st	Winner Greek Cup
2008–09	A1 Ethniki	6th	
2009–10	A1 Ethniki	3rd	Winner Greek Cup
2010–11	A1 Ethniki	3rd	
2011–12	A1 Ethniki	4th	
2012–13	A1 Ethniki	3rd	
2013–14	A1 Ethniki	3rd	
2014–15	A1 Ethniki	8th	
2015–16	A1 Ethniki	6th	Finalist Greek Cup
2016–17	A1 Ethniki	2nd	
2017–18	A1 Ethniki	4th	Finalist Greek Cup

=== Honours ===
Men's team

- Greek Championship
  - Winner (3): 1998, 2001, 2008
- Greek Cup
  - Winner (4): 1998, 1999, 2008, 2010

Women's team

- Greek Championship
  - Winner (1): 1994
- Greek Cup
  - Winner (1): 1994

=== European record ===
Men's team

Season	Competition	Round	Club	1st leg	2nd leg	Aggregate
2016–17	Challenge Cup	R3	(Greece) IEK Xini Dikeas	21–27	24–16	45–43
2016–17	Challenge Cup	1/8	(Turkey) Tasova Yibo SK	32–28	34–30	66–58
2016–17	Challenge Cup	QF	(Portugal) Sporting CP	23–35	25–27	48–62

== Doukas Futsal team ==
Doukas Futsal team was founded in 1996. It plays almost constantly in the first division championship and has won 3 championship and 4 cups.

=== Honours ===
- Greek Championship (6): 2001, 2017, 2018, 2021, 2022, 2023
- Greek Futsal Cup (4): 2001, 2003, 2004, 2015

== Athletics team ==
Doukas has a section of athletics. Many notable Greek athletes have transferred in Doukas. Cases in point are Niki Bakogianni, Angeliki Tsiolakoudi and Stella Tsikouna.
