= Panellinios G.S. =

Multisports club in Greece

- Full name: Πανελλήνιος Γυμναστικός Σύλλογος; Panellinios Gymnastikos Syllogos; (Panhellenic Gymnastic Club)
- Nicknames: The Club of the Olympic Winners
- Founded: 20 February 1891; 134 years ago
- Based in: Athens, Greece
- Colours: Blue, White
- President: Alexios Alexopoulos
- Website: panelliniosac.gr

Panellinios Gymnastikos Syllogos (Greek: Πανελλήνιος Γυμναστικός Σύλλογος, lit. 'Panhellenic Gymnastic Club'), is a Greek multi-sport club that is located in Athens and was founded on 20 February 1891. It is one of the oldest and more successful multi-sports clubs in Greece and also one of the oldest sports clubs in Europe.

The name Panellinios can be translated as Pan-Hellenic in English, and may be used as an adjective that embraces the Greek Nation. Gymnastikos Syllogos can be translated as gymnastics club. Therefore, the club's full name can be translated and/or interpreted as Pan-Hellenic Gymnastics Club.

The Greek multi-sports club Panathinaikos A.O. was founded by Giorgos Kalafatis in 1908, when he and 40 other athletes decided to break away from Panellinios Gymnastikos Syllogos, following the club's decision to discontinue its football team.

== Departments ==
- Panellinios B.C. - basketball
- Panellinios V.C. - volleyball

== Men's athletics ==
The club had a team of gymnasts compete at the 1896 Summer Olympics in Athens. The team’s leader was Spyridon Athanasopoulos. Members included Nikolaos Andriakopoulos, Petros Persakis, Thomas Xenakis, and 29 others. The team placed second of the three teams in the parallel bars team event, earning a silver medal (retroactively awarded by the International Olympic Committee, as the awards at the first Olympic Games differed from the gold, silver, bronze format used later).

Other club members who medaled in athletics at the 1896 Olympics were Alexandre Tuffère, Charilaos Vasilakos, Miltiadis Gouskos, Ioannis Persakis and Sotirios Versis.

== Men's basketball ==
Panellinios B.C. was founded in 1929 and has been the Greek League champion six times in the years 1929, 1939, 1940, 1953, 1955, and 1957. In the early 1950s era the team was nicknamed "The Golden Five", referring to players Panagiotis Manias, Themis Cholevas, Kostas Papadimas, Mimis Stefanidis, and Aristeidis Roubanis, who dominated Greek basketball at the time. The Panellinios team headlined the 1952 Greek Olympic Team. During the mid-to-late 1950s, the team was led by Antonis Christeas.

== Titles ==
The club's famous Discobolus seal

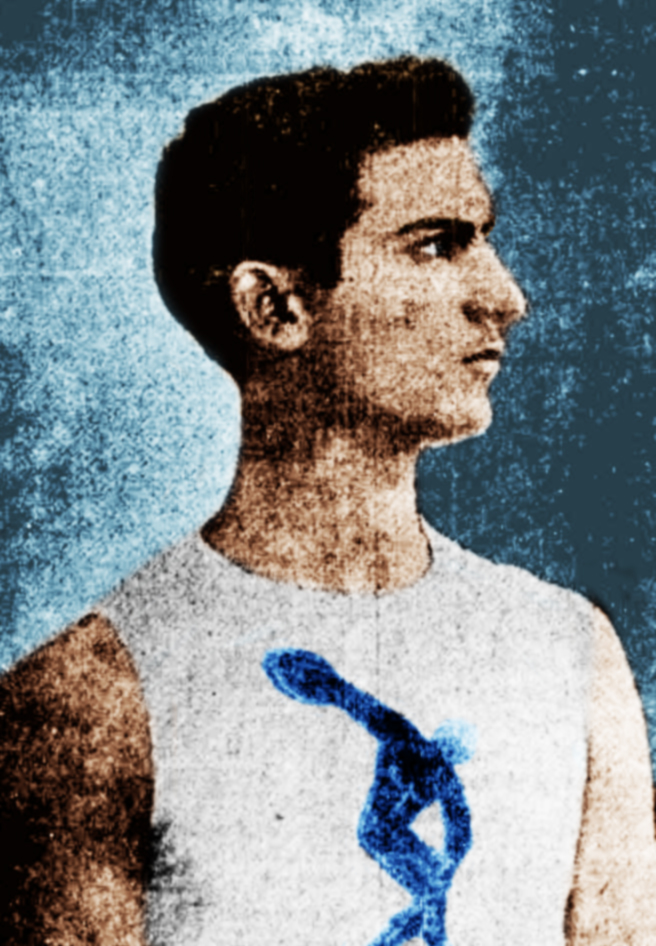
Konstantinos Tsiklitiras

- Men's Basketball - Panellinios B.C.:
  - 6 Greek Championships: (1929, 1939, 1940, 1953, 1955, 1957)
- Men's Volleyball - Panellinios V.C.:
  - 5 Greek Championships: (1936, 1937, 1939, 1940, 1961)
- Women's Volleyball:
  - 2 Greek Championships: (2001, 2002)
  - 1 Greek Cup: (2001)
- Men's Handball:
  - 5 Greek Championships: (2000, 2002, 2004, 2006, 2007)
  - 3 Greek Cups (2000, 2001, 2002)
- Men's Athletics:
  - 36 Greek Championships: (1901, 1904, 1905, 1906, 1907, 1908, 1909, 1911, 1912, 1914, 1917, 1919, 1933, 1934, 1936, 1978, 1981, 1982, 1983, 1987, 1988, 1991, 1992, 1993, 1994, 1995, 1996, 1997, 1998, 1999, 2000, 2001, 2002, 2003, 2004, 2005) (record)
  - 20 Greek Indoor Championships: (1988, 1991, 1992, 1993, 1994, 1995, 1996, 1997, 1998, 1999, 2000, 2001, 2002, 2004, 2005, 2006, 2007, 2008, 2009, 2014) (record)
  - 19 Greek Cross Country Championships: (1907, 1909, 1986, 1987, 1988, 1989, 1990, 1991, 1992, 1993, 1994, 1995, 1998, 1999, 2000, 2001, 2002, 2004, 2006)
- Women's Athletics:
  - 30 Greek Championships: (1938, 1939, 1940, 1951, 1952, 1984, 1985, 1986, 1987, 1988, 1989, 1990, 1992, 1993, 1994, 1995, 1996, 1997, 1998, 1999, 2000, 2001, 2002, 2003, 2004, 2005, 2006, 2007, 2008, 2009) (record)
  - 21 Greek Indoor Championships: (1986, 1988, 1989, 1990, 1992, 1993, 1994, 1997, 1998, 1999, 2000, 2001, 2002, 2004, 2005, 2006, 2007, 2008, 2012, 2013, 2014) (record)
  - 13 Greek Cross Country Championships: (1954, 1987, 1993, 1994, 1995, 1998, 1999, 2000, 2001, 2002, 2003, 2004, 2005) (record)
- Fencing:
  - 18 Greek Épée team Championships, Men: (1953, 1957, 1981, 1984, 1985, 1988, 1990, 1992, 1993, 1995, 1998, 2002, 2005, 2006, 2008, 2009, 2012, 2013)
  - 11 Greek Foil team Championships, Men: (1974, 1976, 1979, 1980, 1981, 1982, 1987, 1988, 1989, 2000, 2002)
  - 12 Greek Sabre team Championships, Men: (1976, 1977, 1986, 1988, 1989, 1992, 2001, 2009, 2011, 2012, 2013, 2014)
  - 4 Greek Épée team Championships, Women: (2009, 2011, 2013, 2015)
  - 5 Greek Foil team Championships, Women: (1980, 1981, 1982, 1983, 1984)
  - 3 Greek Sabre team Championships, Women: (2003, 2004, 2005)
- Men's Weightlifting:
  - 6 Greek Championships: (1988, 1989, 2005, 2010, 2012, 2014)
- Women's Weightlifting:
  - 1 Greek Championship: (2003)
- Men's Boxing:
  - 9 Greek Championships: (1963, 1965, 1987, 1990, 1991, 1994, 2001, 2002, 2004)
- Table tennis:
  - 6 Greek Championships, Women: (1966, 1967, 1968, 1969, 1975, 1980)
  - 1 Greek Cup, Women: (1967)
- Shooting:
  - 4 Greek Championships: (1946, 1947, 1948, 1949)
- Modern Pentathlon:
  - 9 Greek Championships: (1981, 1982, 1983, 1984, 1985, 1988, 1989, 1990, 1991)
- Judo:
  - 14 Greek Championships, Men: (1980, 1981, 1982, 1983, 1984, 1985, 1986, 1987, 1988, 1989, 1990, 1991, 1992, 1994) (record)
  - 15 Greek Championships, Women: (1984, 1985, 1991, 1992, 1993, 1994, 1995, 1996, 1997, 1998, 1999, 2000, 2004, 2005, 2006) (record)
- Football:
  - 1 Greek Championship: (1899)
