= 2023–24 Women's EHF European Cup =

European handball cup competition

EHF European Cup Women
- 2023–24
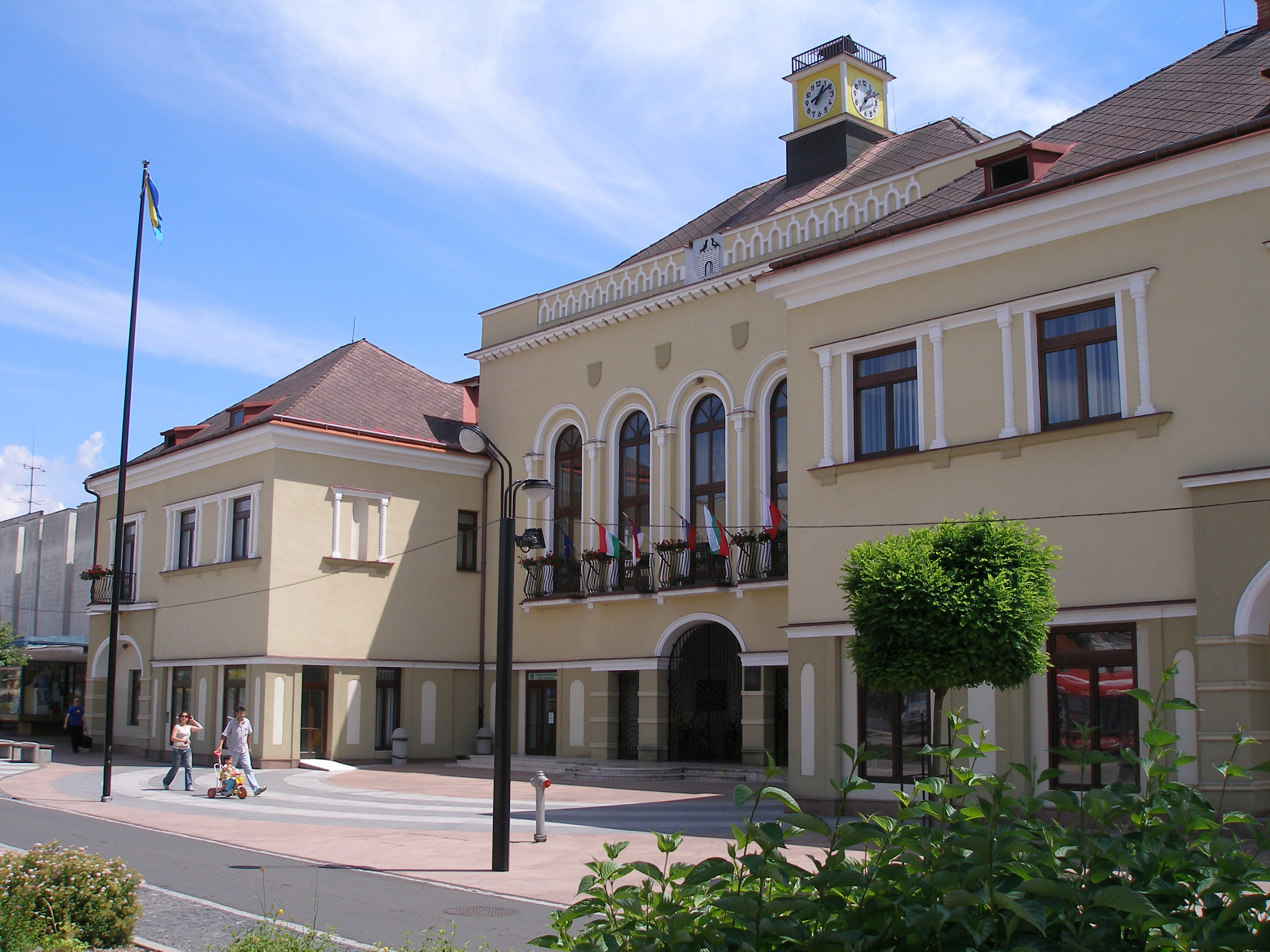
- Chemkostav Aréna in Michalovce hosted the second leg of the final.

Tournament information
- Sport: Handball
- Dates: 23 September 2023–26 May 2024
- Teams: 64
- Website: ehfec.com

Final positions
- Champions: (Spain) Atticgo BM Elche (1st title)
- Runner-up: (Slovakia) MŠK Iuventa Michalovce

Tournament statistics
- Matches played: 124
- Top scorer(s): (Spain) Danila So Delgado (64 goals)

The 2023–24 Women's EHF European Cup was the 31st season of Europe's tertiary club handball tournament organised by European Handball Federation (EHF), and the 4th season since it was renamed from the Challenge Cup to the EHF European Cup. Antalya Konyaaltı are the defending champions, but they couldn't defend their title after being eliminated by KH-7 BM. Granollers in round 3.

Atticgo BM Elche won the tournament by defeating MŠK Iuventa Michalovce, 50–42 on aggregate, in the final.

== Format ==
The tournament is played in a straight knockout format. The ties are held in a home and away format. Overall, there are six rounds to navigate in order to win the trophy (Round 2, Round 3, Last 16, Quarterfinals, Semifinals and Final).

== Rankings ==
The rankings are based on the performances of each club from a respective country from a three year period.

Rank	Association	Average points	Teams
1	Spain	58.67	3
2	Croatia	50.50	2
3	Serbia	32.67	0
4	Ukraine	23.33	0
5	Turkey	19.00	4
6	Czech Republic	16.33	1
7	Netherlands	15.67	3
8	Italy	14.00	4
9	Greece	13.00	4
10	Portugal	12.33	5
11	Iceland	11.33	1
12	Montenegro	10.00	2
13	Slovakia	9.33	2
14	North Macedonia	9.00	3
15	Faroe Islands	8.67	2
16	Belarus	8.67	0

Rank	Association	Average points	Teams
16	Switzerland	8.67	2
18	Israel	8.33	1
19	Austria	7.33	3
20	Bosnia and Herzegovina	6.67	4
21	Sweden	6.00	0
22	Luxembourg	4.67	2
23	Lithuania	4.67	2
24	Azerbaijan	3.67	3
25	Kosovo	3.67	2
26	Malta	2.67	1
27	Slovenia	0.67	3
28	Finland	0.33	0
29	Belgium	0.00	1
30	Bulgaria	0.00	1
31	Cyprus	0.00	2
32	(N/A) Everyone else	0.00	0

== Qualified teams ==
The full list of teams qualified for each stage of the 2023–24 EHF European Cup Women was announced on 10 July 2023.

The labels in the parentheses show how each team qualified for the place of its starting round:

- EC: European Cup title holders
- CW: Cup winners
- CR: Cup runners-up
- 4th, 5th, etc.: League position of the previous season
  - SF: Semi-final league position
  - QF: Quarter-final league position

Round 2
(Turkey) Antalya Konyaaltı ^{EC}	(Austria) 7Drops WAT Atzgersdorf	(Austria) MGA Fivers	(Austria) SC witasek Ferlach
(Azerbaijan) Azeryol HC	(Azerbaijan) Garabagh HC	(Azerbaijan) Kur	(Belgium) KTSV Eupen
(Bosnia and Herzegovina) HRK Grude	(Bosnia and Herzegovina) RK Hadžići	(Bosnia and Herzegovina) ŽRK Borac	(Bosnia and Herzegovina) ŽRK Krivaja
(Bulgaria) HC Byala	(Croatia) ŽRK Dugo Selo 55	(Croatia) ŽRK Bjelovar	(Cyprus) Cyview Dev. Latsia Nicosia
(Cyprus) Youth Union of Athienou	(Czech Republic) Házená Kynžvart	(Faroe Islands) H71	(Faroe Islands) Neistin
(Greece) AESH Pylea Thessaloniki	(Greece) Anagennisi Artas	(Greece) OFN Ionias	(Greece) Panorama
(Iceland) ÍBV Vestmannaeyjar	(Israel) Holon YUVALIM HC	(Israel) Maccabi Arazim Ramat Gan	(Italy) Cassa Rurale Pontinia
(Italy) Jomi Salerno	(Italy) SSD Handball Erice ARL	(Italy) SSV Brixen Südtirol	(Kosovo) KHF Ferizaj
(Kosovo) KHF Istogu	(Lithuania) CASCADA-HC Garliava SM	(Lithuania) Žalgiris Kaunas	(Luxembourg) HB Dudelange
(Luxembourg) HB Käerjeng	Swieqi RGF Malta Phoenix	(Montenegro) ORK Rudar	(Montenegro) ZRK Tivat
(Netherlands) Cabooter HandbaL Venlo	(Netherlands) Veneco Velo Dames I	(Netherlands) Westfriesland SEW	(North Macedonia) WHC Gjorche Petrov
(North Macedonia) WHC Cair Skopje	(North Macedonia) ŽRK Kumanovo	(Portugal) ADA Sao Pedro do Sul	(Portugal) Colégio de Gaia
(Portugal) Madeira SAD	(Portugal) SIR 1 Maio/CBJ	(Portugal) SL Benfica	(Slovakia) HK Slovan Duslo Sala
(Slovakia) MŠK Iuventa Michalovce	(Slovenia) ŽRK Izola	(Slovenia) ŽRD Litija	(Slovenia) ŽRK Mlinotest Ajdovščina
(Spain) Atticgo BM Elche	(Spain) KH-7 BM. Granollers	(Spain) Rocasa Gran Canaria	(Switzerland) HV Herzogenbuchsee
(Switzerland) Yellow Winterthur	(Turkey) Armada Praxis Yalikavakspor	(Turkey) Ankara Yenimahalle BSK	(Turkey) Görele BSK

== Qualifying rounds ==
=== Round 2 ===
A total of 64 teams were involved in the second qualifying round. The first leg matches were held on 23–24 September 2023, while the second leg matches were held on 30 September and 1 October 2023. The draw was on 18 July 2023.

Results

Team 1	Agg.	Team 2	1st leg	2nd leg
ŽRK Bjelovar (Croatia)	65–38	(Luxembourg) HB Dudelange	34–17	31–21
Armada Praxis Yalikavakspor (Turkey)	53–52	(Portugal) ADA Sao Pedro do Sul	23–27	30–25
MŠK Iuventa Michalovce (Slovakia)	81–32	(Bosnia and Herzegovina) ŽRK Borac	45–18	36–14
SL Benfica (Portugal)	67–52	(Austria) SC witasek Ferlach	41–29	26–23
WHC Gjorche Petrov (North Macedonia)	72–46	(Montenegro) ZRK Tivat	43–22	29–24
Maccabi Arazim Ramat Gan (Israel)	59–48	(Kosovo) KHF Ferizaj	26–24	33–24
ORK Rudar (Montenegro)	55–47	(Slovenia) ŽRD Litija	30–19	25–28
7Drops WAT Atzgersdor (Austria)	51–61	(Italy) SSV Brixen Südtirol	25–28	26–33
CASCADA-HC Garliava SM (Lithuania)	49–50	(Faroe Islands) Neistin	28–25	21–25
ŽRK Mlinotest Ajdovščina (Slovenia)	71–55	(Greece) Panorama	40–26	31–29
KTSV Eupen (Belgium)	63–56	(Lithuania) Žalgiris Kaunas	36–27	27–29
Ankara Yenimahalle BSK (Turkey)	60–51	(Netherlands) Veneco Velo Dames I	29–25	31–26
HK Slovan Duslo Šaľa (Slovakia)	64–60	(Italy) Cassa Rurale Pontinia	30–31	34–29
Madeira SAD (Portugal)	69–41	(Austria) MGA Fivers	37–23	32–18
Yellow Winterthur (Switzerland)	54–60	(Czech Republic) Házená Kynžvart	25–29	29–31
ŽRK Kumanovo (North Macedonia)	39–60	(Switzerland) HV Herzogenbuchsee	22–29	17–31
SSD Handball Erice ARL (Italy)	59–52	(Faroe Islands) H71 (women's handball)H71	27–17	32–35
Holon YUVALIM HC (Israel)	32–78	(Spain) Rocasa Gran Canaria	15–37	17–41
Westfriesland SEW (Netherlands)	67–52	(Bosnia and Herzegovina) HRK Grude	34–27	33–25
RK Hadžići (Bosnia and Herzegovina)	38–83	(Turkey) Antalya Konyaaltı	19–39	19–44
Garabagh HC (Azerbaijan)	33–89	(Spain) KH-7 BM. Granollers	15–48	18–41
AESH Pylea Thessaloniki (Greece)	50–40	(Luxembourg) HB Käerjeng	24–21	26–19
Cyview Dev. Latsia Nicosia (Cyprus)	62–68	Swieqi RGF Malta Phoenix	29–35	33–33
Atticgo BM Elche (Spain)	97–30	(Bulgaria) HC Byala	54–13	43–17
Görele BSK (Turkey)	51–63	(Croatia) ŽRK Dugo Selo 55	28–27	23–36
Anagennisi Artas (Greece)	43–60	(Greece) OFN Ionias	20–34	23–26
WHC Cair Skopje (North Macedonia)	44–82	(Netherlands) Cabooter HandbaL Venlo	26–39	18–43
Kur (Azerbaijan)	38–65	(Italy) Jomi Salerno	19–29	19–36
ŽRK Izola (Slovenia)	72–48	(Cyprus) Youth Union of Athienou	42–23	30–25
SIR 1 Maio/CBJ (Portugal)	58–59	(Kosovo) KHF Istogu	31–30	27–29
ŽRK Krivaja (Bosnia and Herzegovina)	57–54	(Azerbaijan) Azeryol HC	31–29	26–25
Colégio de Gaia (Portugal)	50–53	(Iceland) ÍBV Vestmannaeyjar	23–27	27–26

=== Round 3 ===
A total of 32 teams were involved in the third qualifying round. The first leg matches were held on 11–12 November 2023, while the second leg matches were held on 18–19 November 2023. The draw was on 3 October 2023.

Results

Team 1	Agg.	Team 2	1st leg	2nd leg
SL Benfica (Portugal)	67–52	(Faroe Islands) Neistin	34–27	33–25
Házená Kynžvart (Czech Republic)	61–47	(Netherlands) Westfriesland SEW	31–24	30–23
Antalya Konyaaltı (Turkey)	54–56	(Spain) KH-7 BM. Granollers	29–27	25–29
Ankara Yenimahalle BSK (Turkey)	20–0	(Israel) Maccabi Arazim Ramat Gan (Note: The Israeli team Maccabi Arazim Ramat Gan withdrew from the tournament due to the Gaza war. Ankara Yenimahalle BSK advanced to the next round.)	10–0	10–0
SSD Handball Erice ARL (Italy)	51–42	(Slovenia) ŽRK Izola	26–19	25–23
HK Slovan Duslo Šaľa (Slovakia)	52–57	(Croatia) ŽRK Bjelovar	30–27	22–30
ORK Rudar (Montenegro)	51–54	(Greece) AESH Pylea Thessaloniki	29–28	22–26
MŠK Iuventa Michalovce (Slovakia)	90–36	(Kosovo) KHF Istogu	43–18	47–18
ŽRK Mlinotest Ajdovščina (Slovenia)	56–44	(Switzerland) HV Herzogenbuchsee	35–24	21–20
Cabooter HandbaL Venlo (Netherlands)	69–34	(Bosnia and Herzegovina) ŽRK Krivaja	39–19	30–15
KTSV Eupen (Belgium)	75–94	(North Macedonia) WHC Gjorche Petrov	39–46	36–48
ÍBV Vestmannaeyjar (Iceland)	42–69	(Portugal) Madeira SAD	19–33	23–36
SSV Brixen Südtirol (Italy)	46–64	(Turkey) Armada Praxis Yalikavakspor	27–36	19–28
OFN Ionias (Greece)	50–60	(Spain) Atticgo BM Elche	23–27	27–33
Swieqi RGF Malta Phoenix	36–76	(Italy) Jomi Salerno	17–39	19–37
Rocasa Gran Canaria (Spain)	56–44	(Croatia) ŽRK Dugo Selo 55	34–23	22–21

== Last 16 ==
The Last 16 first leg matches were held on 13–14 January 2024, while the Last 16 second leg matches were held on 20–21 January 2024. The draw was on the 21 November 2023.

Results

Team 1	Agg.	Team 2	1st leg	2nd leg
KH-7 BM. Granollers (Spain)	64–56	(Italy) SSD Handball Erice ARL	34–27	30–29
Madeira SAD (Portugal)	49–59	(Spain) Atticgo BM Elche	27–26	22–33
ŽRK Mlinotest Ajdovščina (Slovenia)	48–63	(Slovakia) MŠK Iuventa Michalovce	22–31	26–32
Jomi Salerno (Italy)	39–56	(Spain) Rocasa Gran Canaria	20–26	19–30
ŽRK Bjelovar (Croatia)	48–65	(Netherlands) Cabooter HandbaL Venlo	21–29	27–36
WHC Gjorche Petrov (North Macedonia)	65–63	(Czech Republic) Házená Kynžvart	32–29	33–34
SL Benfica (Portugal)	75–58	(Greece) AESH Pylea Thessaloniki	44–26	31–32
Ankara Yenimahalle BSK (Turkey)	46–63	(Turkey) Armada Praxis Yalikavakspor	23–27	23–36

== Quarterfinals ==
The first leg matches were held on 9–10 March 2024, while the second leg matches were held on 16–17 March 2024. The draw was on 23 January 2024.

Results

Team 1	Agg.	Team 2	1st leg	2nd leg
MŠK Iuventa Michalovce (Slovakia)	57–43	(Netherlands) Cabooter HandbaL Venlo	30–18	27–25
Atticgo BM Elche (Spain)	73–39	(North Macedonia) WHC Gjorche Petrov	36–21	37–18
KH-7 BM. Granollers (Spain)	50–52	(Spain) Rocasa Gran Canaria	30–20	20–32 PS
SL Benfica (Portugal)	63–52	(Turkey) Armada Praxis Yalikavakspor	33–29	30–23

=== Matches ===
10 March 2024; 17:00	MŠK Iuventa Michalovce (Slovakia)	30–18	(Netherlands) Cabooter HandbaL Venlo	Chemkostav Aréna, Michalovce; Attendance: 950; Referees: Fotakidis, Kinatzidis (GRE)
10 March 2024; 17:00	Kompaniiets 6	(12–8)	de Swart 5	Chemkostav Aréna, Michalovce; Attendance: 950; Referees: Fotakidis, Kinatzidis (GRE)
10 March 2024; 17:00	7× (suspension)	Report	2× (suspension)	Chemkostav Aréna, Michalovce; Attendance: 950; Referees: Fotakidis, Kinatzidis (GRE)

16 March 2023; 19:00	Cabooter HandbaL Venlo (Netherlands)	25–27	(Slovakia) MŠK Iuventa Michalovce	Egerbos, Venlo; Attendance: 400; Referees: Härgin, Makejev (EST)
16 March 2023; 19:00	Grummel, Kruijswijk 5	(12–12)	Klucková, Kompaniiets 5	Egerbos, Venlo; Attendance: 400; Referees: Härgin, Makejev (EST)
16 March 2023; 19:00	1× (yellow card) 3× (suspension)	Report	2× (yellow card) 4× (suspension)	Egerbos, Venlo; Attendance: 400; Referees: Härgin, Makejev (EST)

MŠK Iuventa Michalovce won 57–43 on aggregate

10 March 2024; 12:30	Atticgo BM Elche (Spain)	36–21	(North Macedonia) WHC Gjorche Petrov	Pabellón Municipal Esperanza Lag, Elche; Attendance: 1,200; Referees: Manea, Iliescu (ROU)
10 March 2024; 12:30	Van Zijl 9	(14–10)	Jankulovska 6	Pabellón Municipal Esperanza Lag, Elche; Attendance: 1,200; Referees: Manea, Iliescu (ROU)
10 March 2024; 12:30	1× (yellow card) 6× (suspension) 1× (red card)	Report	4× (yellow card)	Pabellón Municipal Esperanza Lag, Elche; Attendance: 1,200; Referees: Manea, Iliescu (ROU)

17 March 2024; 19:00	WHC Gjorche Petrov (North Macedonia)	18–37	(Spain) Atticgo BM Elche	Avtokomanda, Skopje; Attendance: 500; Referees: Simone, Monitillo (ITA)
17 March 2024; 19:00	Rizoska 4	(10–16)	Arranz 10	Avtokomanda, Skopje; Attendance: 500; Referees: Simone, Monitillo (ITA)
17 March 2024; 19:00	6× (suspension)	Report	3× (suspension)	Avtokomanda, Skopje; Attendance: 500; Referees: Simone, Monitillo (ITA)

Atticgo BM Elche won 73–39 on aggregate

10 March 2024; 16:15	KH-7 BM. Granollers (Spain)	30–20	(Spain) Rocasa Gran Canaria	Palau d'Esports de Granollers, Granollers; Attendance: 1,052; Referees: Schols (NED), Martens (BEL)
10 March 2024; 16:15	Guarieiro 8	(11–13)	Nascimento 6	Palau d'Esports de Granollers, Granollers; Attendance: 1,052; Referees: Schols (NED), Martens (BEL)
10 March 2024; 16:15	1× (yellow card) 2× (suspension)	Report	4× (suspension)	Palau d'Esports de Granollers, Granollers; Attendance: 1,052; Referees: Schols (NED), Martens (BEL)

16 March 2024
13:30
Rocasa Gran Canaria (Spain)
32–20
(Spain) KH-7 BM. Granollers
Antonio Moreno, Telde
Attendance: 359
Referees: Fabryczny, Rawicki (POL)
Nascimento 8
(10–11)
Capdevila 6
1× (yellow card) 3× (suspension)
Report
7× (suspension)

FT: 28–18 Pen: 4–2

Rocasa Gran Canaria won 52–50 on aggregate

9 March 2024; 13:00	SL Benfica (Portugal)	33–29	(Turkey) Armada Praxis Yalikavakspor	Pavilhão da Luz Nº 2, Lisbon; Attendance: 273; Referees: Picard, Vauchez (FRA)
9 March 2024; 13:00	Shunu 9	(19–17)	Gomes 6	Pavilhão da Luz Nº 2, Lisbon; Attendance: 273; Referees: Picard, Vauchez (FRA)
9 March 2024; 13:00	4× (suspension)	Report	2× (suspension)	Pavilhão da Luz Nº 2, Lisbon; Attendance: 273; Referees: Picard, Vauchez (FRA)

17 March 2024; 17:00	Armada Praxis Yalikavakspor (Turkey)	23–30	(Portugal) SL Benfica	Binnaz Karakaya Sports Hall, Bodrum; Attendance: 743; Referees: Ilievski, Ilievski (NMK)
17 March 2024; 17:00	four players 4	(11–12)	Borschenko, Shunu 7	Binnaz Karakaya Sports Hall, Bodrum; Attendance: 743; Referees: Ilievski, Ilievski (NMK)
17 March 2024; 17:00	2× (yellow card) 4× (suspension) 1× (red card)	Report	1× (yellow card) 8× (suspension)	Binnaz Karakaya Sports Hall, Bodrum; Attendance: 743; Referees: Ilievski, Ilievski (NMK)

SL Benfica won 63–52 on aggregate

== Semifinals ==
The first leg matches were held on 21 April 2024, while the second leg matches were held on 27–28 April 2024. The draw was on 23 January 2024.

Results

Team 1	Agg.	Team 2	1st leg	2nd leg
Rocasa Gran Canaria (Spain)	42–50	(Spain) Atticgo BM Elche	24–26	18–24
MŠK Iuventa Michalovce (Slovakia)	60–58	(Portugal) SL Benfica	30–28	30–30

=== Matches ===
21 April 2024; 13:30	Rocasa Gran Canaria (Spain)	24–26	(Spain) Atticgo BM Elche	Antonio Moreno, Telde; Attendance: 350; Referees: Cipov, Klus (SVK)
21 April 2024; 13:30	Nascimento 5	(12–11)	So Delgado 11	Antonio Moreno, Telde; Attendance: 350; Referees: Cipov, Klus (SVK)
21 April 2024; 13:30		Report	1× (yellow card) 2× (suspension)	Antonio Moreno, Telde; Attendance: 350; Referees: Cipov, Klus (SVK)

27 April 2024; 21:00	Atticgo BM Elche (Spain)	24–18	(Spain) Rocasa Gran Canaria	Pabellón Municipal Esperanza Lag, Elche; Attendance: 1,560; Referees: Sirbu, Serdiuc (MDA)
27 April 2024; 21:00	Gómez 7	(17–8)	Nascimento 4	Pabellón Municipal Esperanza Lag, Elche; Attendance: 1,560; Referees: Sirbu, Serdiuc (MDA)
27 April 2024; 21:00	1× (yellow card) 2× (suspension)	Report	1× (yellow card) 5× (suspension)	Pabellón Municipal Esperanza Lag, Elche; Attendance: 1,560; Referees: Sirbu, Serdiuc (MDA)

Atticgo BM Elche won 50–42 on aggregate

21 April 2024; 17:00	MŠK Iuventa Michalovce (Slovakia)	30–28	(Portugal) SL Benfica	Chemkostav Aréna, Michalovce; Attendance: 1,600; Referees: Rauchs, Linster (LUX)
21 April 2024; 17:00	Habánková, Kompaniiets 7	(14–11)	Borschenko 7	Chemkostav Aréna, Michalovce; Attendance: 1,600; Referees: Rauchs, Linster (LUX)
21 April 2024; 17:00	2× (yellow card) 4× (suspension)	Report	1× (yellow card) 3× (suspension)	Chemkostav Aréna, Michalovce; Attendance: 1,600; Referees: Rauchs, Linster (LUX)

27 April 2024; 16:00	SL Benfica (Portugal)	30–30	(Slovakia) MŠK Iuventa Michalovce	Pavilhão da Luz Nº 2, Lisbon; Attendance: 686; Referees: Geraets, Geraets (NED)
27 April 2024; 16:00	Shunu 7	(17–20)	Wollingerová 8	Pavilhão da Luz Nº 2, Lisbon; Attendance: 686; Referees: Geraets, Geraets (NED)
27 April 2024; 16:00	1× (yellow card) 2× (suspension)	Report	1× (yellow card) 7× (suspension)	Pavilhão da Luz Nº 2, Lisbon; Attendance: 686; Referees: Geraets, Geraets (NED)

MŠK Iuventa Michalovce won 60–58 on aggregate

== Final ==
The first leg match was held on 18–19 May 2024, while the second leg match was held on 25–26 June 2024. The draw was on the 30 April 2024.

Results

Team 1	Agg.	Team 2	1st leg	2nd leg
Atticgo BM Elche (Spain)	50–42	(Slovakia) MŠK Iuventa Michalovce	22–20	28–22

=== Matches ===
19 May 2024; 12:00	Atticgo BM Elche (Spain)	22–20	(Slovakia) MŠK Iuventa Michalovce	Pabellón Municipal Esperanza Lag, Elche; Attendance: 2,000; Referees: Puksic, Satler (SLO)
19 May 2024; 12:00	Wolfs 5	(11–10)	Wollingerová 5	Pabellón Municipal Esperanza Lag, Elche; Attendance: 2,000; Referees: Puksic, Satler (SLO)
19 May 2024; 12:00	1× (suspension)	Report	1× (yellow card) 4× (suspension)	Pabellón Municipal Esperanza Lag, Elche; Attendance: 2,000; Referees: Puksic, Satler (SLO)

24 May 2024; 18:00	MŠK Iuventa Michalovce (Slovakia)	22–28	(Spain) Atticgo BM Elche	Chemkostav Aréna, Michalovce; Attendance: 1,600; Referees: Radčenko, Pērsis (LAT)
24 May 2024; 18:00	Wollingerová 11	(10–15)	So Delgado, Van Zijl 5	Chemkostav Aréna, Michalovce; Attendance: 1,600; Referees: Radčenko, Pērsis (LAT)
24 May 2024; 18:00	1× (yellow card) 1× (suspension)	Report	1× (yellow card) 1× (suspension)	Chemkostav Aréna, Michalovce; Attendance: 1,600; Referees: Radčenko, Pērsis (LAT)

Atticgo BM Elche won 50–42 on aggregate

== See also ==
- 2023–24 EHF Champions League
- 2023–24 EHF European League
- 2023–24 Women's EHF Champions League
- 2023–24 Women's EHF European League
- 2023–24 EHF European Cup
