= 2024–25 Women's EHF European Cup =

European handball cup competition

EHF European Cup Women
- 2024–25
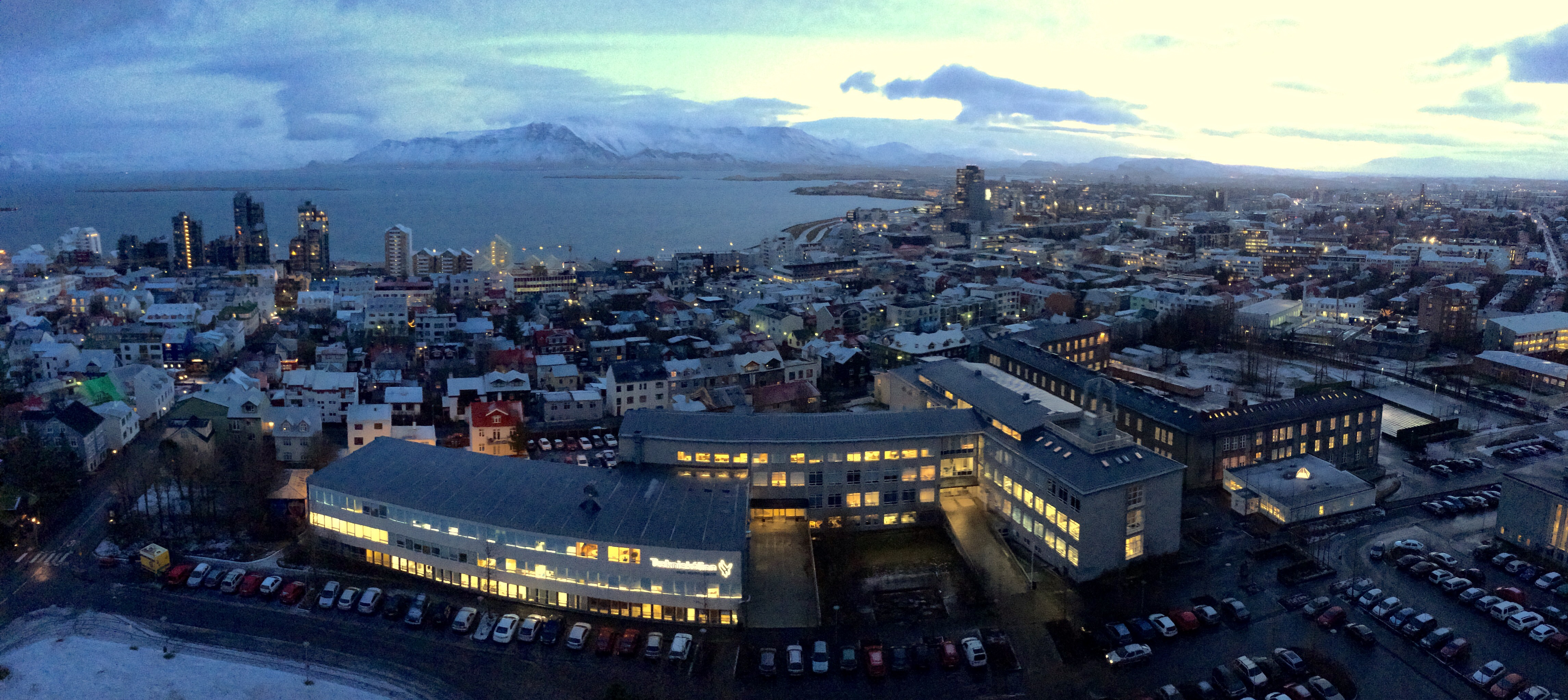
- The N1 höllin in Reykjavík hosted the second leg of the final.

Tournament information
- Sport: Handball
- Teams: 64
- Website: ehfec.com

Final positions
- Champions: (Iceland) Valur (1st title)
- Runner-up: (Spain) Conservas Orbe Zendal BM Porriño

Tournament statistics
- Matches played: 124

The 2024–25 Women's EHF European Cup is the 32nd season of Europe's tertiary club handball tournament organised by European Handball Federation (EHF), and the 5th season since it was renamed from the Challenge Cup to the EHF European Cup. Atticgo BM Elche are the defending champions but didn't defend their title due to their involvement in this season's European League.

Valur won their first title after beating Conservas Orbe Zendal BM Porriño in the final.

== Format ==
The tournament is played in a straight knockout format. The ties are held in a home and away format. Overall, there are six rounds to navigate in order to win the trophy (Round 2, Round 3, Last 16, Quarterfinals, Semifinals and Final).

== Rankings ==
The rankings are based on the performances of each club from a respective country from a three year period.

Rank	Association	Average points	Teams
1	Spain	63.33	3
2	Croatia	58.00	2
3	Turkey	40.67	3
4	Ukraine	26.00	1
5	Serbia	24.00	2
6	Slovakia	22.33	2
7	Czech Republic	18.67	2
8	Portugal	15.00	3
9	Greece	14.67	5
10	Iceland	14.00	2
11	Faroe Islands	13.67	2
12	Switzerland	13.33	2
13	Belarus	12.50	0
14	North Macedonia	11.67	2
15	Italy	11.67	4
16	Israel	10.67	0

Rank	Association	Average points	Teams
17	Netherlands	10.67	2
18	Montenegro	9.00	1
19	Poland	8.67	1
20	Bosnia and Herzegovina	8.33	4
21	Sweden	8.00	1
22	Austria	6.67	3
23	Luxembourg	5.67	3
24	Azerbaijan	4.67	3
25	Kosovo	4.67	3
26	Malta	2.67	0
27	Finland	1.33	0
28	Lithuania	1.00	2
29	Bulgaria	0.67	0
30	Slovenia	0.67	2
31	Cyprus	0.33	2
N/A	Belgium	0.00	1
N/A	(N/A) Everyone else	0.00	0

== Qualified teams ==
The full list of teams qualified for each stage of the 2024–25 Women's EHF European Cup was announced on 9 July 2024.

The labels in the parentheses show how each team qualified for the place of its starting round:

- EC: European Cup title holders
- CW: Cup winners
- CR: Cup runners-up
- 4th, 5th, etc.: League position of the previous season
  - SF: Semi-final league position
  - QF: Quarter-final league position

Round 2
(Austria) WAT Atzgersdorf (2nd)	(Austria) UHC Müllner Bau Stockerau (4th)	(Austria) Greenpower JAGS Roomz Hotels (7th)	(Azerbaijan) Azeryol HC
(Azerbaijan) Garabagh HC	(Azerbaijan) Kur	(Belgium) KTSV Eupen (2nd)	(Bosnia and Herzegovina) HRK Grude
(Bosnia and Herzegovina) RK Hadžići	(Bosnia and Herzegovina) ŽRK Borac	(Bosnia and Herzegovina) ŽRK Krivaja	(Croatia) DC Dalmatinka Ploče (4th)
(Croatia) ŽRK Bjelovar (5th)	(Cyprus) Cyview Developers Latsia	(Cyprus) Youth Union of Athienou	(Czech Republic) Házená Kynžvart (2nd)
(Czech Republic) DHC Slavia Praha (3rd)	(Faroe Islands) H71 (3rd)	(Faroe Islands) VÍF (4th)	(Greece) OFN Ionias (1st)
(Greece) AC PAOK (2nd, CW)	(Greece) AESH Pylea Thessaloniki (3rd)	(Greece) Anagennisi Artas (4th)	(Greece) AEP Panorama (5th)
(Iceland) Valur (1st)	(Iceland) Haukar (2nd)	(Italy) SSV Brixen Südtirol (1st)	(Italy) SSD Handball Erice ARL (2nd, CW)
(Italy) Jomi Salerno (3rd)	(Italy) A.S.D. Handball Cassa Rurale Pontinia (4th)	(Kosovo) KHF Istogu (1st)	(Kosovo) KHF Ferizaj (2nd, CW)
(Kosovo) KHF Samadrexha (3rd)	(Lithuania) Cascada-HC Garliava SM (1st)	(Lithuania) Žalgiris Kaunas (4th)	(Luxembourg) HB Dudelange (CW)
(Luxembourg) HB Red Boys Differdange	(Luxembourg) HB Käerjeng (CW)	(Montenegro) ZRK Tivat (2nd)	(Netherlands) JuRo Unirek VZV (3rd)
(Netherlands) Venéco VELO (4th)	(Netherlands) Westfriesland SEW (5th)	(North Macedonia) WHC Cair Skopje (2nd)	(North Macedonia) WHC Metalurg Avtokomanda (3rd)
(Poland) MKS Urbis Gniezno (4th)	(Portugal) Madeira Andebol SAD (2nd)	(Portugal) Colégio de Gaia (3rd)	(Portugal) ADA Sao Pedro do Sul (4th)
(Serbia) ŽRK Železničar (2nd)	(Serbia) ŽORK Jagodina (3rd)	(Slovakia) MŠK Iuventa Michalovce (2nd)	(Slovakia) HK Slovan Duslo Šaľa (3rd)
(Slovenia) ŽRK Mlinotest Ajdovščina (2nd, CW)	(Slovenia) ŽRD Litija (3rd)	(Spain) Costa del Sol Malaga (3rd)	(Spain) Conservas Orbe Zendal BM Porriño (4th)
(Spain) Caja Rural Aula Valladolid (6th)	(Sweden) Kristianstad HK (5th)	(Switzerland) SPONO Eagles (3rd)	(Switzerland) HSC Kreuzlingen (4th)
(Turkey) Görele Bld. SK (5th)	(Turkey) Bursa Büyüksehir Bld. SK (6th)	(Turkey) Üsküdar B.S.K. (7th)	(Ukraine) HC Galychanka Lviv (1st)

== Qualifying rounds ==
=== Round 2 ===
A total of 64 teams are involved in the second qualifying round. The first leg matches are held on 5–6 October 2024, while the second leg matches are held on 12–13 October 2024. The draw was on the 16 of July 2024.

Results

Team 1	Agg.	Team 2	1st leg	2nd leg
Görele Bld. SK (Turkey)	70–65	(North Macedonia) WHC Metalurg Avtokomanda	36–28	34–37
Házená Kynžvart (Czech Republic)	62–45	(Slovenia) ŽRD Litija	32–22	30–23
DC Dalmatinka Ploče (Croatia)	55–45	(Bosnia and Herzegovina) ŽRK Borac	24–23	31–22
SSV Brixen Südtirol (Italy)	37–70	(Spain) Conservas Orbe Zendal BM Porriño	21–36	16–34
SPONO Eagles (Switzerland)	48–58	(Greece) PAOK	27–33	21–25
ZRK Tivat (Montenegro)	43–72	(Turkey) Bursa Büyüksehir Bld. SK	25–34	18–38
Kristianstad HK (Sweden)	67–48	(Netherlands) Westfriesland SEW	32–23	35–25
KHF Istogu (Kosovo)	68–52	(Greece) AESH Pylea Thessaloniki	33–25	35–27
HB Dudelange (Luxembourg)	52–35	(Netherlands) Venéco VELO	22–17	30–18
Garabagh HC (Azerbaijan)	53–49	(Luxembourg) HB Red Boys Differdange	27–24	26–25
KTSV Eupen (Belgium)	33–68	(Iceland) Haukar	16–38	17–30
Cascada-HC Garliava SM (Lithuania)	51–72	(Italy) SSD Handball Erice ARL	24–31	27–41
Caja Rural Aula Valladolid (Spain)	79–30	(Kosovo) KHF Ferizaj	39–12	40–18
Colégio de Gaia (Portugal)	79–61	(Kosovo) KHF Samadrexha	42–31	37–30
ŽORK Jagodina (Serbia)	62–46	(Bosnia and Herzegovina) RK Hadžići	30–27	32–19
DHC Slavia Praha (Czech Republic)	63–56	(Slovenia) ŽRK Mlinotest Ajdovščina	34–30	29–26
H71 (Faroe Islands)	91–35	(Cyprus) Cyview Developers Latsia	50–14	41–21
HSC Kreuzlingen (Switzerland)	43–54	(Slovakia) MŠK Iuventa Michalovce	24–27	19–27
UHC Müllner Bau Stockerau (Austria)	42–70	(Serbia) ŽRK Železničar	27–38	15–32
HB Käerjeng (Luxembourg)	50–58	(North Macedonia) WHC Cair Skopje	24–26	26–32
Kur (Azerbaijan)	47–65	(Greece) OFN Ionias	25–32	22–33
Žalgiris Kaunas (Lithuania)	45–65	(Iceland) Valur	17–31	28–34
Youth Union of Athienou (Cyprus)	36–78	(Bosnia and Herzegovina) HRK Grude	21–39	15–39
ADA Sao Pedro do Sul (Portugal)	52–52; 4–3 (p)	(Slovakia) HK Slovan Duslo Šaľa	28–25	24–27
Jomi Salerno (Italy)	53–48	(Faroe Islands) VÍF	27–21	26–27
Greenpower JAGS Roomz Hotels (Austria)	44–57	(Austria) WAT Atzgersdorf	19–27	25–30
Azeryol HC (Azerbaijan)	38–68	(Ukraine) HC Galychanka Lviv	22–36	16–32
A.S.D. Handball Cassa Rurale Pontinia (Italy)	47–63	(Spain) Costa del Sol Malaga	25–32	22–31
Anagennisi Artas (Greece)	43–60	(Portugal) Madeira Andebol SAD	20–30	23–30
ŽRK Krivaja (Bosnia and Herzegovina)	52–65	(Netherlands) JuRo Unirek VZV	25–35	27–30
ŽRK Bjelovar (Croatia)	50–64	(Turkey) Üsküdar B.S.K.	26–32	24–32
AEP Panorama (Greece)	34–57	(Poland) MKS Urbis Gniezno	17–31	17–26

=== Round 3 ===
A total of 32 teams are involved in the third qualifying round. The first leg matches are held on 9–10 November 2024, while the second leg matches are held on 16–17 November 2024. The draw will be on the 15 of October 2024.

Results

Team 1	Agg.	Team 2	1st leg	2nd leg
KHF Istogu (Kosovo)	62–78	(Czech Republic) Házená Kynžvart	30–44	32–34
H71 (Faroe Islands)	53–54	(Greece) PAOK	23–31	30–23
Conservas Orbe Zendal BM Porriño (Spain)	58–52	(Turkey) Bursa Büyüksehir Bld. SK	34–26	24–26
OFN Ionias (Greece)	50–43	(Serbia) ŽORK Jagodina	27–20	23–23
MŠK Iuventa Michalovce (Slovakia)	83–42	(Bosnia and Herzegovina) HRK Grude	44–20	39–22
HC Galychanka Lviv (Ukraine)	67–39	(Azerbaijan) Garabagh HC	33–20	34–19
Üsküdar B.S.K. (Turkey)	45–64	(Portugal) Madeira Andebol SAD	25–28	20–36
Costa del Sol Malaga (Spain)	56–38	(Portugal) ADA Sao Pedro do Sul	32–15	24–23
ŽRK Železničar (Serbia)	41–55	(Spain) Caja Rural Aula Valladolid	20–32	21–23
MKS Urbis Gniezno (Poland)	56–44	(Italy) SSD Handball Erice ARL	30–18	26–26
Jomi Salerno (Italy)	52–61	(Czech Republic) DHC Slavia Praha	20–32	32–29
Görele Bld. SK (Turkey)	58–70	(Austria) WAT Atzgersdorf	32–35	26–35
Valur (Iceland)	56–48	(Sweden) Kristianstad HK	27–24	29–24
Colégio de Gaia (Portugal)	51–57	(North Macedonia) WHC Cair Skopje	25–29	26–28
HB Dudelange (Luxembourg)	53–66	(Netherlands) JuRo Unirek VZV	22–30	31–36
DC Dalmatinka Ploče (Croatia)	39–41	(Iceland) Haukar	23–24	16–17

== Last 16 ==
The Last 16 first leg matches are held on 11–12 January 2025, while the second leg matches are held on 18–19 January 2025. The draw will be on the 19 of November 2024.

Results

Team 1	Agg.	Team 2	1st leg	2nd leg
OFN Ionias (Greece)	59–42	(Netherlands) JuRo Unirek VZV	34–21	25–21
DHC Slavia Praha (Czech Republic)	64–49	(North Macedonia) WHC Cair Skopje	31–20	33–29
HC Galychanka Lviv (Ukraine)	46–50	(Iceland) Haukar	24–26	22–24
WAT Atzgersdorf (Austria)	37–70	(Spain) Conservas Orbe Zendal BM Porriño	18–42	19–28
Costa del Sol Malaga (Spain)	51–56	(Iceland) Valur	25–25	26–31
Madeira Andebol SAD (Portugal)	60–61	(Czech Republic) Házená Kynžvart	33–34	27–27
PAOK (Greece)	47–49	(Slovakia) MŠK Iuventa Michalovce	30–22	17–27
MKS Urbis Gniezno (Poland)	68–64	(Spain) Caja Rural Aula Valladolid	33–34	35–30

== Quarterfinals ==
The first leg matches are held on 15–16 February 2025, while the second leg matches are held on 22–23 February 2025. The draw will be on 21 January 2025.

Results

Team 1	Agg.	Team 2	1st leg	2nd leg
Conservas Orbe Zendal BM Porriño (Spain)	50–41	(Greece) OFN Ionias	23–15	27–26
Házená Kynžvart (Czech Republic)	57–51	(Iceland) Haukar	35–24	22–27
MŠK Iuventa Michalovce (Slovakia)	62–43	(Poland) MKS Urbis Gniezno	36–21	26–22
Valur (Iceland)	49–44	(Czech Republic) DHC Slavia Praha	27–22	22–22

=== Matches ===
15 February 2025; 20:00	Conservas Orbe Zendal BM Porriño (Spain)	23–15	(Greece) OFN Ionias	OAKA Sport Hall Kassimatis, Marousi; Attendance: 250; Referees: Fält, Holm (SWE)
15 February 2025; 20:00	Vallés, Santomé 5	(9–8)	Kepesidou, Tsàkalou 3	OAKA Sport Hall Kassimatis, Marousi; Attendance: 250; Referees: Fält, Holm (SWE)
15 February 2025; 20:00	2× (suspension) 1× (red card)	Report	3× (suspension)	OAKA Sport Hall Kassimatis, Marousi; Attendance: 250; Referees: Fält, Holm (SWE)

16 February 2025; 21:00	OFN Ionias (Greece)	26–27	(Spain) Conservas Orbe Zendal BM Porriño	OAKA Sport Hall Kassimatis, Marousi; Attendance: 170; Referees: Fält, Holm (SWE)
16 February 2025; 21:00	Tsàkalou 6	(15–12)	Casasola 9	OAKA Sport Hall Kassimatis, Marousi; Attendance: 170; Referees: Fält, Holm (SWE)
16 February 2025; 21:00	2× (suspension)	Report	1× (suspension)	OAKA Sport Hall Kassimatis, Marousi; Attendance: 170; Referees: Fält, Holm (SWE)

Conservas Orbe Zendal BM Porriño won 50–41 on aggregate

15 February 2025; 16:00	Házená Kynžvart (Czech Republic)	35–24	(Iceland) Haukar	D-Produkt Arena, Cheb; Attendance: 800; Referees: Ilievski, Ilievski (MKD)
15 February 2025; 16:00	Vávrová, Bezrukova 8	(17–11)	Oddén 5	D-Produkt Arena, Cheb; Attendance: 800; Referees: Ilievski, Ilievski (MKD)
15 February 2025; 16:00	1× (yellow card) 2× (suspension)	Report	2× (yellow card) 3× (suspension)	D-Produkt Arena, Cheb; Attendance: 800; Referees: Ilievski, Ilievski (MKD)

22 February 2025; 16:30	Haukar (Iceland)	27–22	(Czech Republic) Házená Kynžvart	Ithrottamidstod Hauka Asvellir, Hafnarfjörður; Attendance: 360; Referees: Riello, Panetta (ITA)
22 February 2025; 16:30	Þorkelsdóttir 7	(15–8)	Božović 7	Ithrottamidstod Hauka Asvellir, Hafnarfjörður; Attendance: 360; Referees: Riello, Panetta (ITA)
22 February 2025; 16:30	1× (yellow card) 1× (suspension)	Report	1× (suspension)	Ithrottamidstod Hauka Asvellir, Hafnarfjörður; Attendance: 360; Referees: Riello, Panetta (ITA)

Házená Kynžvart won 57–51 on aggregate

15 February 2025; 18:00	MŠK Iuventa Michalovce (Slovakia)	36–21	(Poland) MKS Urbis Gniezno	Chemkostav Arena, Michalovce; Attendance: 600; Referees: Nygaard, Primdahl (DEN)
15 February 2025; 18:00	Soskyda 7	(17–8)	Hartman 8	Chemkostav Arena, Michalovce; Attendance: 600; Referees: Nygaard, Primdahl (DEN)
15 February 2025; 18:00	2× (yellow card) 3× (suspension)	Report	1× (yellow card) 2× (suspension)	Chemkostav Arena, Michalovce; Attendance: 600; Referees: Nygaard, Primdahl (DEN)

22 February 2025; 17:00	MKS Urbis Gniezno (Poland)	22–26	(Slovakia) MŠK Iuventa Michalovce	Hala Widowiskowo-Sportowa im. Mieczysława Łopatki, Gniezno; Attendance: 900; Referees: Hardarson, Magnússon (ISL)
22 February 2025; 17:00	Schlabs, Legowska 4	(9–8)	Soskyda 6	Hala Widowiskowo-Sportowa im. Mieczysława Łopatki, Gniezno; Attendance: 900; Referees: Hardarson, Magnússon (ISL)
22 February 2025; 17:00	1× (yellow card) 4× (suspension)	Report	1× (yellow card) 8× (suspension) 1× (red card)	Hala Widowiskowo-Sportowa im. Mieczysława Łopatki, Gniezno; Attendance: 900; Referees: Hardarson, Magnússon (ISL)

MŠK Iuventa Michalovce won 62–43 on aggregate

22 February 2025; 16:00	Valur (Iceland)	28–21	(Czech Republic) DHC Slavia Praha	N1 höllin, Reykjavík; Attendance: 403; Referees: Cournil, Lamour (FRA)
22 February 2025; 16:00	Ásgeirsdóttir 8	(17–12)	Schreibmeierová 6	N1 höllin, Reykjavík; Attendance: 403; Referees: Cournil, Lamour (FRA)
22 February 2025; 16:00	2× (suspension)	Report	1× (yellow card) 5× (suspension)	N1 höllin, Reykjavík; Attendance: 403; Referees: Cournil, Lamour (FRA)

23 February 2025; 16:00	DHC Slavia Praha (Czech Republic)	22–22	(Iceland) Valur	N1 höllin, Reykjavík; Attendance: 361; Referees: Cournil, Lamour (FRA)
23 February 2025; 16:00	Schreibmeierová 9	(14–9)	Ásgeirsdóttir 8	N1 höllin, Reykjavík; Attendance: 361; Referees: Cournil, Lamour (FRA)
23 February 2025; 16:00	4× (suspension) 1× (red card)	Report	1× (yellow card) 4× (suspension)	N1 höllin, Reykjavík; Attendance: 361; Referees: Cournil, Lamour (FRA)

Valur won 49–44 on aggregate

== Semifinals ==
The first leg matches are held on 22–23 March 2025, while the second leg matches are held on 29–30 March 2025. The draw will be on 21 January 2025.

Results

Team 1	Agg.	Team 2	1st leg	2nd leg
Conservas Orbe Zendal BM Porriño (Spain)	61–55	(Czech Republic) Házená Kynžvart	31–28	30–27
MŠK Iuventa Michalovce (Slovakia)	45–53	(Iceland) Valur	25–23	20–30

=== Matches ===
23 March 2025; 19:00	Conservas Orbe Zendal BM Porriño (Spain)	31–28	(Czech Republic) Házená Kynžvart	Pabellon Municipal Porriño, O Porriño; Attendance: 1,500; Referees: Klompers, Stobbe (NED)
23 March 2025; 19:00	Valles Becerra 9	(13–15)	Božović 8	Pabellon Municipal Porriño, O Porriño; Attendance: 1,500; Referees: Klompers, Stobbe (NED)
23 March 2025; 19:00	1× (yellow card) 4× (suspension)	Report	1× (yellow card) 5× (suspension)	Pabellon Municipal Porriño, O Porriño; Attendance: 1,500; Referees: Klompers, Stobbe (NED)

29 March 2025; 16:00	Házená Kynžvart (Czech Republic)	27–30	(Spain) Conservas Orbe Zendal BM Porriño	D-Produkt Arena, Cheb; Attendance: 590; Referees: Bosnjak, Maric (BIH)
29 March 2025; 16:00	Dresslerová, Vávrová 6	(12–15)	Zhukova 6	D-Produkt Arena, Cheb; Attendance: 590; Referees: Bosnjak, Maric (BIH)
29 March 2025; 16:00	1× (yellow card) 5× (suspension)	Report	5× (yellow card)	D-Produkt Arena, Cheb; Attendance: 590; Referees: Bosnjak, Maric (BIH)

Conservas Orbe Zendal BM Porriño won 61–55 on aggregate

23 March 2025; 17:00	MŠK Iuventa Michalovce (Slovakia)	25–23	(Iceland) Valur	Chemkostav Aréna, Michalovce; Attendance: 900; Referees: Schols (NED), Martins (BEL)
23 March 2025; 17:00	Habánková 5	(14–8)	Ásgeirsdóttir 7	Chemkostav Aréna, Michalovce; Attendance: 900; Referees: Schols (NED), Martins (BEL)
23 March 2025; 17:00	1× (yellow card)	Report	2× (yellow card)	Chemkostav Aréna, Michalovce; Attendance: 900; Referees: Schols (NED), Martins (BEL)

30 March 2025; 19:30	Valur (Iceland)	30–20	(Slovakia) MŠK Iuventa Michalovce	N1 höllin, Reykjavík; Attendance: 961; Referees: Fabryczny, Rawicki (POL)
30 March 2025; 19:30	Ásgeirsdóttir 8	(17–10)	Klucková 4	N1 höllin, Reykjavík; Attendance: 961; Referees: Fabryczny, Rawicki (POL)
30 March 2025; 19:30	2× (yellow card) 2× (suspension)	Report	1× (yellow card) 5× (suspension) 3× (red card)	N1 höllin, Reykjavík; Attendance: 961; Referees: Fabryczny, Rawicki (POL)

Valur won 53–45 on aggregate

== Final ==
The first leg match was held on 10 May 2025, while the second leg match was held on 17 May 2025. The draw was on 1 April 2025.

Results

Team 1	Agg.	Team 2	1st leg	2nd leg
Conservas Orbe Zendal BM Porriño (Spain)	53–54	(Iceland) Valur	29–29	24–25

=== Matches ===
10 May 2025; 17:00	Conservas Orbe Zendal BM Porriño (Spain)	29–29	(Iceland) Valur	Pabellon Municipal Porriño, O Porriño; Attendance: 2,000; Referees: Fotakidis, Kinatzidis (GRE)
10 May 2025; 17:00	Casasola 10	(12–16)	Ásgeirsdóttir 11	Pabellon Municipal Porriño, O Porriño; Attendance: 2,000; Referees: Fotakidis, Kinatzidis (GRE)
10 May 2025; 17:00	4× (suspension) 1× (red card)	Report	1× (yellow card) 7× (suspension)	Pabellon Municipal Porriño, O Porriño; Attendance: 2,000; Referees: Fotakidis, Kinatzidis (GRE)

17 May 2025; 17:00	Valur (Iceland)	25–24	(Spain) Conservas Orbe Zendal BM Porriño	N1 höllin, Reykjavík; Attendance: 1,789; Referees: Picard, Vauchez (FRA)
17 May 2025; 17:00	Ásgeirsdóttir 6	(12–9)	Pérez Buforn 6	N1 höllin, Reykjavík; Attendance: 1,789; Referees: Picard, Vauchez (FRA)
17 May 2025; 17:00	5× (suspension)	Report	3× (suspension)	N1 höllin, Reykjavík; Attendance: 1,789; Referees: Picard, Vauchez (FRA)

Valur won 54–53 on aggregate

== See also ==
- 2024–25 EHF Champions League
- 2024–25 EHF European League
- 2024–25 Women's EHF Champions League
- 2024–25 Women's EHF European League
- 2024–25 EHF European Cup
