= 2013–14 Lithuanian Women's Handball League =

The 2013–14 Lithuanian Women's Handball League season is the 24th season of the Lithuanian Women's Handball League, the top level women's handball in Lithuania. Five teams participated in the league, when four regular teams withdrew from the league (MRK KKSC Panevėžys, MRK KKSC Utena, Tauras-Vilniaus bakalėja Vilnius, Širšės Kaunas) League started at 5 October 2013 and will finish at 7 June 2014.

== Regular season ==
Location of teams in the 2013-2014 Lithuanian Women's Handball League

	Club	GP	W	D	L	GF	GA	DF	Pts
1st	ACME-Žalgiris	16	15	1	0	639	478	+161	31
2nd	SM Tauras-Vilniaus kolegija	16	10	1	5	549	523	+26	21
3rd	HC SM Garliava	16	7	1	8	551	551	0	15
4th	Eglė Vilnius	16	4	1	11	498	554	-56	9
5th	SM Dubysa Šiauliai	16	1	2	13	512	643	-131	4

== Playoffs ==
=== Semifinals ===
- (1) ACME-Žalgiris - (4) Eglė Vilnius (47:28, 51:24, 47:33)
- (2) SM Tauras-Vilniaus kolegija - (3) HC SM Garliava (26:28, 37:33, 29:26, 29:34, 32:24)

=== 3rd place game ===
- (4) Eglė Vilnius - (3) HC SM Garliava (29:35, 26:30)

=== Final ===
- (1) ACME-Žalgiris - (2) SM Tauras-Vilniaus kolegija (36:33, 27:24, 38:31)
