= Diana Šatkauskaitė =

Lithuanian handball player (born 1992)

Personal information
- Full name: Diana Šatkauskaitė
- Nationality: Lithuanian
- Born: 23 January 1992 (age 34) Šiauliai, Lithuania
- Height: 1.74 m (5 ft 9 in)

Sport
- Sport: Handball
- Position: Left Back
- Current club: HC SM Garliava
- Number: 9
National team
- Years: Team
- –: Lithuania

Diana Šatkauskaitė (born 23 January 1992) is a Lithuanian handballer who currently plays for HC SM Garliava. She was born in Šiauliai and is a member of the Lithuanian national team.

In 2013 Šatkausaitė was announced as MVP of Lithuanian Women's Championships.

== Achievements ==
- Lithuanian Women's Handball League:
  - 2011
