= Veronika Mikulášková =

Czech handball player

Personal information
- Nationality: Czech
- Born: 16 October 2000 (age 26) Olomouc, Czech Republic
- Height: 1.72 m (5 ft 8 in)

Sport
- Sport: Handball
- Position: Centre back
- Current club: DHK Baník Most
- Number: 96

Senior clubs
- Years: Team
- 2017–: DHK Baník Most
National team
| Years | Team | Apps | (Gls) |
| 2018– | Czech Republic | 34 | (8) |
- Updated on 23 April 2024

Veronika Mikulášková (born 16 October 2000) is a Czech handballer for DHK Baník Most and the Czech national team.

She participated at the 2018 European Women's Handball Championship.

== Achievements ==
- Czech First Division:
  - Winner: 2018
