= Michaela Holanová =

Czech handball player

Personal information
- Nationality: Czech
- Born: 4 February 1990 (age 36) Písek, Czechoslovakia
- Height: 1.72 m (5 ft 8 in)

Sport
- Sport: Handball
- Position: Left back
- Current club: DHK Baník Most
- Number: 8

Senior clubs
- Years: Team
- 2008-2013: DHC Sokol Poruba
- 2013-: DHK Baník Most
National team
Years	Team	Apps	(Gls)
2012–	Czech Republic	17	(23)

Michaela Holanová (born 4 February 1990) is a Czech handballer for DHK Baník Most and the Czech national team.

She participated at the 2021 World Women's Handball Championship in Spain, placing 19th.

== Achievements ==
- Czech First Division:
  - Winner: 2012, 2014, 2015, 2016, 2017, 2018, 2019, 2021
