= 2019–20 Women's EHF Champions League qualifying =

This article describes the qualifying of the 2019–20 Women's EHF Champions League.

== Draw ==
The four teams played a semifinal and final to determine the last participant for the group stage. Matches were played on 7 and 8 September 2019. In the qualification semi-finals DHK Baník Most took on Rocasa Gran Canaria, while ŽORK Jagodina met Kastamonu GSK. The matches from the tournament was played in one venue. The hosting rights for the qualification tournament were drawn on Wednesday 26 June 2019 in Vienna, Austria. Only the winner of this tournament advanced to the group stage, which starts between 4 and 6 October 2019.

== Qualification tournament ==
DHK Baník Most hosted the tournament.

=== Bracket ===
Semifinals
7 September
(Spain) Rocasa Gran Canaria	21
(Czech Republic) DHK Baník Most	28
7 September
(Turkey) Kastamonu GSK	31
(Serbia) ŽORK Jagodina	15

Final
8 September
(Czech Republic) DHK Baník Most	35
(Turkey) Kastamonu GSK	33
Third place
8 September
(Spain) Rocasa Gran Canaria	28
(Serbia) ŽORK Jagodina	15

=== Semifinals ===
7 September 2019; 15:30	Rocasa Gran Canaria (Spain)	21–28	(Czech Republic) DHK Baník Most	Most Sports Hall, Most; Attendance: 1,000; Referees: Ilieva, Karbeska (MKD)
7 September 2019; 15:30	Gutkowska 4	(11–11)	Kostelná 6	Most Sports Hall, Most; Attendance: 1,000; Referees: Ilieva, Karbeska (MKD)
7 September 2019; 15:30	3× (yellow card) 2× (suspension)	Report	3× (yellow card) 1× (suspension)	Most Sports Hall, Most; Attendance: 1,000; Referees: Ilieva, Karbeska (MKD)

7 September 2019; 18:00	Kastamonu GSK (Turkey)	31–15	(Serbia) ŽORK Jagodina	Most Sports Hall, Most; Attendance: 500; Referees: Kijauskaitė, Žalienė (LTU)
7 September 2019; 18:00	İskit 7	(15–6)	Ašanin, Nišavić 3	Most Sports Hall, Most; Attendance: 500; Referees: Kijauskaitė, Žalienė (LTU)
7 September 2019; 18:00	3× (yellow card) 6× (suspension)	Report	3× (yellow card) 3× (suspension) 1× (red card)	Most Sports Hall, Most; Attendance: 500; Referees: Kijauskaitė, Žalienė (LTU)

=== Third place game ===
8 September 2019; 13:30	Rocasa Gran Canaria (Spain)	28–15	(Serbia) ŽORK Jagodina	Most Sports Hall, Most; Attendance: 200; Referees: Ilieva, Karbeska (MKD)
8 September 2019; 13:30	Falcón, Rodríguez 5	(15–8)	Ašanin, Gojković 4	Most Sports Hall, Most; Attendance: 200; Referees: Ilieva, Karbeska (MKD)
8 September 2019; 13:30	2× (yellow card) 1× (suspension)	Report	3× (yellow card) 2× (suspension)	Most Sports Hall, Most; Attendance: 200; Referees: Ilieva, Karbeska (MKD)

=== Final ===
8 September 2019; 16:00	DHK Baník Most (Czech Republic)	35–33	(Turkey) Kastamonu GSK	Most Sports Hall, Most; Attendance: 1,600; Referees: Kijauskaitė, Žalienė (LTU)
8 September 2019; 16:00	Zachová 9	(20–13)	İskit 7	Most Sports Hall, Most; Attendance: 1,600; Referees: Kijauskaitė, Žalienė (LTU)
8 September 2019; 16:00	2× (yellow card) 6× (suspension)	Report	3× (yellow card) 7× (suspension)	Most Sports Hall, Most; Attendance: 1,600; Referees: Kijauskaitė, Žalienė (LTU)
