= Luxembourg National Division (women's handball) =

- Founded: 1974
- No. of teams: 8
- Country: Luxembourg
- Confederation: EHF
- Most recent champion: HB Dudelange
- Most titles: HBC Bascharage (30 titles)
- Level on pyramid: 1
- International cups: EHF Cup; EHF Challenge Cup
- Website: https://www.flh.lu
- 2016–17 season

The Luxembourg Sales Lentz League is the name of the women's handball league of Luxembourg.

== Competition format ==
The season begins with a tournament between the eights teams. The first six teams qualify for the play-offs, while the last two plays play-downs.

== 2016/17 Season participants ==
The following 8 clubs compete in the Sales Lentz League during the 2016–17 season.

Team	City	Arena
HC Standard	Luxembourg City	Hall Bonnevoie
CHEV Diekirch	Diekirch	Hall Sportif Diekirch
HB Dudelange	Dudelange	René Hartmann Sport Center
HB Museldall	Grevenmacher	Sport Center
Handball Käerjeng	Käerjeng	Käerjenger Dribbel Sport Center
HB Pétange	Pétange	Pétange Sport Center
HC Atert Redange	Redange-sur-Attert	Redange Hall Omnisports
HBC Schifflange ASBL	Schifflange	Schifflange Sport Center

== National Division Champions ==
National champions are:

- 1974-1975 : HB Dudelange (1/12)
- 1976 : HB Dudelange (2/12)
- 1977 : HB Dudelange (3/12)
- 1978 : HBC Bascharage (1/35)
- 1979 : HBC Bascharage (2/35)
- 1980 : HBC Bascharage (3/35)
- 1981 : HBC Bascharage (4/35)
- 1982 : HBC Bascharage (5/35)
- 1983 : HBC Bascharage (6/35)
- 1984 : HBC Bascharage (7/35)
- 1985 : HBC Bascharage (8/35)
- 1986 : HBC Bascharage (9/35)
- 1987 : HBC Bascharage (10/35)
- 1988 : Espérance Rumelange (1/1)
- 1989 : HB Dudelange (4/12)
- 1990 : HC Berchem (1/1)
- 1991 : HBC Bascharage (11/35)
- 1992 : HBC Bascharage (12/35)
- 1993 : HBC Bascharage (13/35)
- 1994 : HBC Bascharage (14/35)
- 1995 : HBC Bascharage (15/35)
- 1996 : HBC Bascharage (16/35)
- 1997 : HBC Bascharage (17/35)
- 1998 : HBC Bascharage (18/35)
- 1999 : HBC Bascharage (19/35)
- 2000 : HBC Bascharage (20/35)
- 2001 : HBC Bascharage (21/35)
- 2002 : HBC Bascharage (22/35)
- 2003 : HBC Bascharage (23/35)
- 2004 : HBC Bascharage (24/35)
- 2005 : HBC Bascharage (25/35)
- 2006 : HBC Bascharage (26/35)
- 2007 : HBC Bascharage (27/35)
- 2008 : HBC Bascharage (28/35)
- 2009 : HBC Bascharage (29/35)
- 2010 : HB Dudelange (5/12)
- 2011 : HB Dudelange (6/12)
- 2012 : CHEV Diekirch (1/2)
- 2013 : HB Dudelange (7/12)
- 2014 : HB Dudelange (8/12)
- 2015 : HB Dudelange (9/12)
- 2016 : HB Dudelange (10/12)
- 2017 : HB Museldall Grevenmacher (1/1)
- 2018 : Handball Käerjeng (30/35)
- 2019 : Handball Käerjeng (31/35)
- 2019-2020 : Handball Käerjeng (32/35)
- 2020-2021 : CHEV Diekirch (2/2)
- 2021-2022 : Handball Käerjeng (33/35)
- 2022-2023 : Handball Käerjeng (34/35)
- 2023-2024 : HB Dudelange (11/12)
- 2024-2025 : Handball Käerjeng (35/35)
- 2025-2026 : HB Dudelange (12/12)

	Club	Titles	Year
1	HBC Bascharage/HB Käerjeng	35	1978, 1979, 1980, 1981, 1982, 1983, 1984, 1985, 1986, 1987, 1991, 1992, 1993, 1994, 1995, 1996, 1997, 1998, 1999, 2000, 2001, 2002, 2003, 2004, 2005, 2006, 2007, 2008, 2009, 2018, 2019, 2020, 2022, 2023, 2025
2	HB Dudelange	12	1975, 1976, 1977, 1988, 2010, 2011, 2013, 2014, 2015, 2016, 2024, 2026
3	CHEV Diekirch	2	2012, 2021
4	Espérance Rumelange	1	1988
	HC Berchem	1	1990
	HB Museldall Grevenmacher	1	2017

== EHF coefficient ranking ==
For season 2017/2018, see footnote

- 27. (25) (Greece) A1 Ethniki (4.58)
- 28. (28) (Belgium) Eerste Klasse (4.44)
- 29. (31) (Luxembourg) Sales Lentz League (3.00)
- 30. (29) (Azerbaijan) Premier Handball League (2.44)
- 31. (32) (Kosovo) Superliga (2.13)
