= Házená Kynžvart =

Czech handball club

- Founded: 1970
- Arena: Lokomotiva D-PRODUKT Aréna, Cheb; Sportovní hala Milana Prokeše, Lázně Kynžvart
- Capacity: 1,250 (Cheb), 350 (Lázně Kynžvart)
- President: Vladimír König
- Head coach: Peter Sabadka
- League: MOL Liga
- 2025–26: Bronze
- Club colours
Home	Away

Házená Kynžvart (Czech pronunciation: [ˈha:zena: ˈkɪnʒvart]), a section of TJ Sokol Lázně Kynžvart, is a professional women's handball club from Lázně Kynžvart, Czech Republic. Since the 2021–22 season, they have been competing in the MOL Liga, the top tier women's handball league in the Czech Republic and Slovakia.

== Playgrounds ==
Until 2017, Kynžvart played on various indoor and outdoor pitches, mainly on the grounds of the local elementary school. When a new multifunctional sports hall (Sportovní hala Milana Prokeše) has been opened in Lázně Kynžvart in 2018, the club moved most of its activities there.

Nevertheless, the new sports hall has a low capacity (350 spectators), it is difficult to place all necessary facilities for organising international matches and perfect TV broadcasting. In addition to that, it was eligible for playing the EHF European Cup only due to a special exempt of the European Handball Federation.

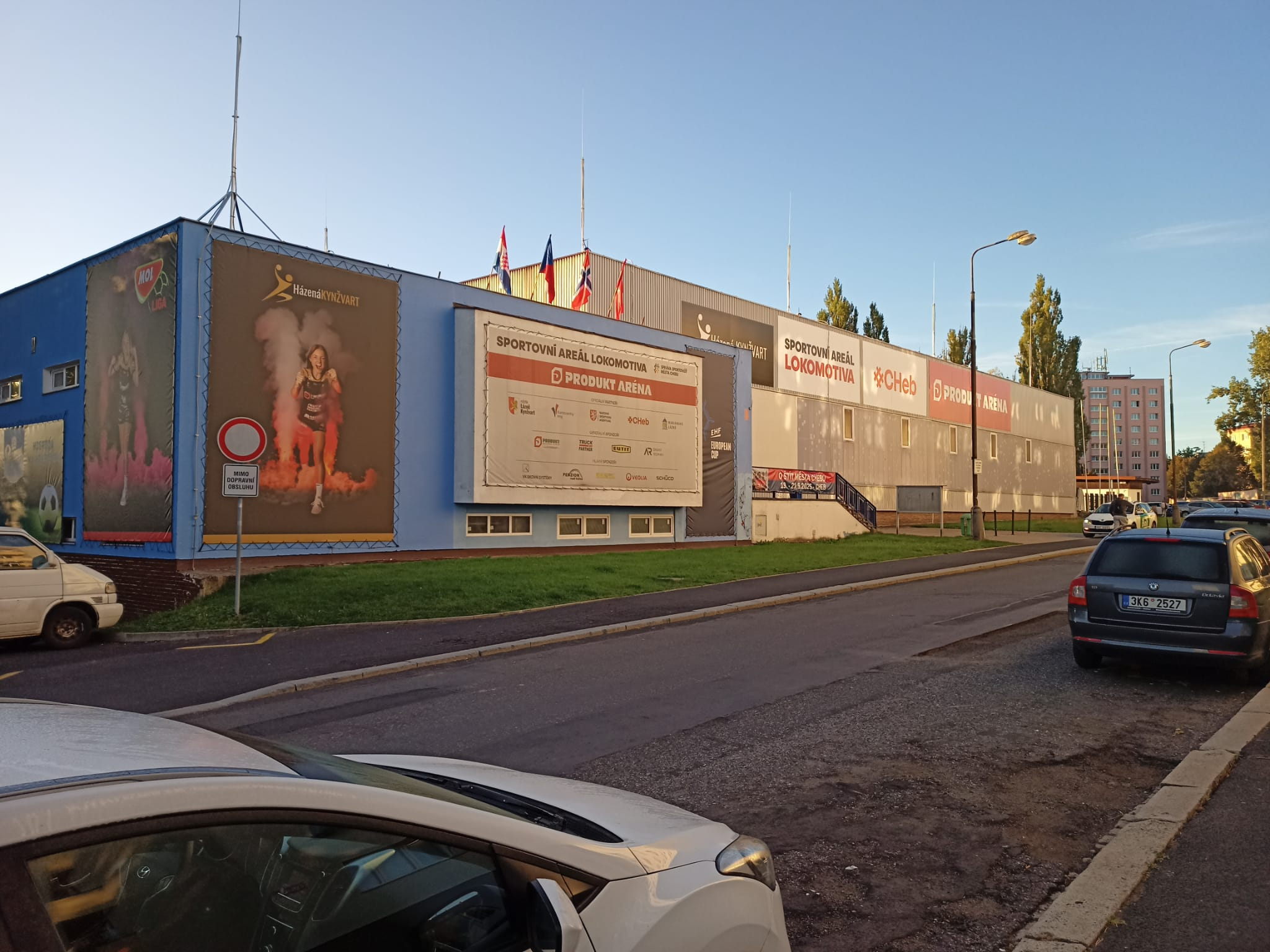
Exterior of the D-PRODUKT Aréna in September 2025

Therefore, since the 2023–24 season, the first team plays almost all of their home matches at the Lokomotiva D-PRODUKT Aréna in the nearby district town of Cheb. For training purposes, all teams keep using the existing sport halls and playgrounds in Lázně Kynžvart.

== Results ==
=== National ===
- Czech First Division
  - Silver: 2024, 2026
  - Bronze: 2025
- Czech Cup
  - Silver: 2022, 2024, 2025

=== International ===
- EHF European Cup
  - Semifinals: 2025
  - Quarterfinals: 2026
- WHIL
  - Bronze: 2026
  - 4th place: 2022, 2024, 2025

== European record ==
Season	Competition	Round	Club	1st leg	2nd leg	Aggregate
2022–23	EHF European Cup	Round 3	(Turkey) Ankara Yenimahalle BSK	35–29 (A)	27–29 (H)	62–58
2022–23	EHF European Cup	Last 16	(Spain) Motive.co Gijón	24–26 (H)	23–35 (A)	47–61
2023–24	EHF European Cup	Round 2	(Switzerland) Yellow Winterthur	29–25 (H1)	31–29 (H2)	60–54
2023–24	EHF European Cup	Round 3	(Netherlands) Westfriesland SEW	31–24 (H)	30–23 (A)	61–47
2023–24	EHF European Cup	Last 16	(North Macedonia) WHC Gjorche Petrov	29–32 (A)	34–33 (H)	63–65
2024–25	EHF European Cup	Round 2	(Slovenia) ŽRD Litija	32–22 (H)	30–23 (A)	62–45
2024–25	EHF European Cup	Round 3	(Kosovo) KHF Istogu	44–30 (H)	34–32 (A)	78–62
2024–25	EHF European Cup	Last 16	(Portugal) Madeira Andebol SAD	34–33 (A)	27–27 (H)	61–60
2024–25	EHF European Cup	Quarterfinals	(Iceland) Haukar	35–24 (H)	22–27 (A)	57–51
2024–25	EHF European Cup	Semifinals	(Spain) Conservas Orbe Zendal BM Porriño	28–31 (A)	27–30 (H)	55–61
2025–26	EHF European Cup	Round 3	(Austria) Union Korneuburg Damen	40–24 (A)	45–23 (H)	85–47
2025–26	EHF European Cup	Last 16	(Italy) Jomi Salerno	33–28 (A1)	29–32 (A2)	62–60
2025–26	EHF European Cup	Quarterfinals	(Spain) CBF Málaga Costa del Sol	18–33 (A1)	20–23 (A2)	38–56
2026–27	EHF European League	Round 3	TBD	TBD	TBD	TBD

== Team ==
=== Current squad ===
Squad for the 2025–26 season

Goalkeepers

- 33 (Czech Republic) Adéla Srpová
- 55 (Czech Republic) Andrea Buchtová

Back players
LB

- 19 (Czech Republic) Veronika Vávrová
- 44 (Czech Republic) Markéta Königová
- 99 (Brazil) Tauani Martins Schneider

CB

- 28 (Montenegro) Marija Božović
- 68 (Czech Republic) Tereza Filípková

RB

- 21 (Czech Republic) Tereza Michalcová
- 37 (Czech Republic) Claudia Rampová

Wingers
LW

- 4 (Czech Republic) Kristýna Königová
- 14 (Czech Republic) Natálie Sobotíková
- 72 (Czech Republic) Šárka Kapusniaková

RW

- 10 (Czech Republic) Marcela Skácelová
- 22 (Slovakia) Annamaria Lauko
- 85 (Czech Republic) Kristýna Hejkalová

Line players

- 5 (Czech Republic) Barbora Tesařová
- 24 (Czech Republic) Katka Dresslerová (captain)
- 35 (Czech Republic) Klára Blahutová

==== Transfers ====
Transfers for the 2025–26 season

Joining

- (Czech Republic) Klára Blahutová (LP) (from own youth)
- (Czech Republic) Andrea Buchtová (GK) (from own youth)
- (Czech Republic) Tereza Filípková (CB) (from (Czech Republic) Handball Club Zlín)
- (Czech Republic) Markéta Königová (LB) (from own youth)
- (Czech Republic) Claudia Rampová (RB) (from own youth)
- (Brazil) Tauani Martins Schneider (LB) (from (Poland) KPR Kobierzyce)
- (Czech Republic) Natálie Sobotíková (LW) (from own youth)

Leaving

- (Ukraine) Sofiya Bezrukova (LB) (to (Turkey) Armada Praxis Yalıkavak Spor)
- (Turkey) Betül Karaarslan (CB) (to (Turkey) Armada Praxis Yalıkavak Spor)
- (Czech Republic) Sabrina Novotná (GK) (to (France) Metz Handball)
- (Czech Republic) Marie Poláková (RB) (to (Germany) SV Union Halle-Neustadt)

Transfers for the 2026–27 season

Joining

- (Czech Republic) Adéla Chvátalová (GK) (from (Czech Republic) DHC Plzeň)

Leaving

- (Czech Republic) Andrea Buchtová (GK) (takes a break from professional sport)
- (Slovakia) Annamaria Lauko (RW) (retires)

=== Technical staff ===
Staff for the 2025–26 season

- (Slovakia) Head coach: Peter Sabadka
- (Czech Republic) Goalkeeping coach: Lenka Černá
- (Czech Republic) Team Assistant: Miroslav Straka
- (Czech Republic) Physiotherapist: Denis Kucharik
- (Czech Republic) Masseur: Adéla Pilmaierová
- (Czech Republic) Strength and Conditioning Coach: Tomáš Susko
- (Czech Republic) President: Vladimír König
