= Algerian Handball Federation =

Governing body of handball in Algeria

Algerian Handball Federation FAHB
- IOC nation: People's Democratic Republic of Algeria (ALG)
- Sport: Handball
- Other sports: Beach Handball; Wheelchair Handball

HISTORY
- Year of formation: 1962

AFFILIATIONS
- International federation: International Handball Federation (IHF)
- IHF member since: 1964
- Continental association: African Handball Confederation
- National Olympic Committee: Algerian Olympic Committee
- Other affiliation(s): Mediterranean Handball Confederation

GOVERNING BODY
- President: Mourad Boussebt (Algeria)

HEADQUARTERS
- Address: Algiers
- Country: Algeria
- Secretary General: Mr. Hocine Ressioui

Algerian Handball Federation (Arabic: الاتحادية الجزائرية لكرة اليد, French: Fédération Algérienne de Handball) (FAHB) is the national handball and beach handball federation in Algeria. FAHB organizes handball within Algeria, and represents Algerian handball internationally. The federation is a member of the African Handball Confederation (CAHB), Algerian Olympic Committee and the International Handball Federation (IHF). The current president of the FAHB from 6 March 2025 on is Mourad Boussebt.

== Presidents ==
- 1963-1965: Amar Benbelkacem
- 1965-1966: Mohamed Boubekeur
- 1967-1968: Amar Benbelkacem
- 1968-1972: Salah Brahimi
- 1972-1975: Ali Amoura
- 1976-1977: Allaoua Daksi
- 1977-1980: Said Bouamra
- 1980-1982: Mouloud Bendjellit
- 1982-1985: Said Bouamra
- 1985-1986: Brahim Amrat
- 1986-1989: Abderahmane Bouzidi
- 1989-1997: Said Bouamra
- 1997-1998: Noureddine Allal
- 1998-2001: Mohamed Tahmi
- 2001-2006: Dahmane Rahmouni
- 2006-2008: Allaoua Daksi
- 2008-2012: Ait Mouloud Djaffer
- 2012-2017: Said Bouamra
- April 2017-17 September 2021: Habib Labane
- 17 September-12 October 2021: Abdelkrim Bendjemil
- 19 November 2022-10 February 2025: Karima Taleb
- Since 6 March 2025: Mourad Boussebt

== Competitions ==
=== Men Senior Competitions ===
- Algerian Handball Championship (Division 1)
- Algerian Handball Championship D2 (Division 2)
- Algerian Handball Cup
- Algerian Handball Super Cup

=== Women Senior Competitions ===
- Algerian Women's Handball Championship
- Algerian Women's Handball Cup
- Algerian Women's Handball Super Cup
