= Ariel Pietrasik =

Polish handball player (born 1999)

Personal information
- Nationality: Polish
- Born: 21 October 1999 (age 26) Łódź, Poland
- Height: 2.02 m (6 ft 8 in)

Sport
- Sport: Handball
- Position: Left back
- Current club: Kadetten Schaffhausen

Senior clubs
- Years: Team
- 2016–2021: HC Berchem
- 2021–2023: TSV St. Otmar St. Gallen
- 2023–: Kadetten Schaffhausen
National team
Years	Team	Apps	(Gls)
2021–	Poland	55	(116)
- Updated on 12 January 2026

Ariel Pietrasik (born 21 October 1999) is a Polish-Luxembourgish handball player for Swiss team Kadetten Schaffhausen and the Polish national team. He is noted for playing with both his dominant right hand and his weaker left hand.

He started his career in Luxembourgish Handball at the youth team of HC Berchem at the age of 15. He debuted for the senior team in 2016.
