= Dominika Zachová =

Czech handball player

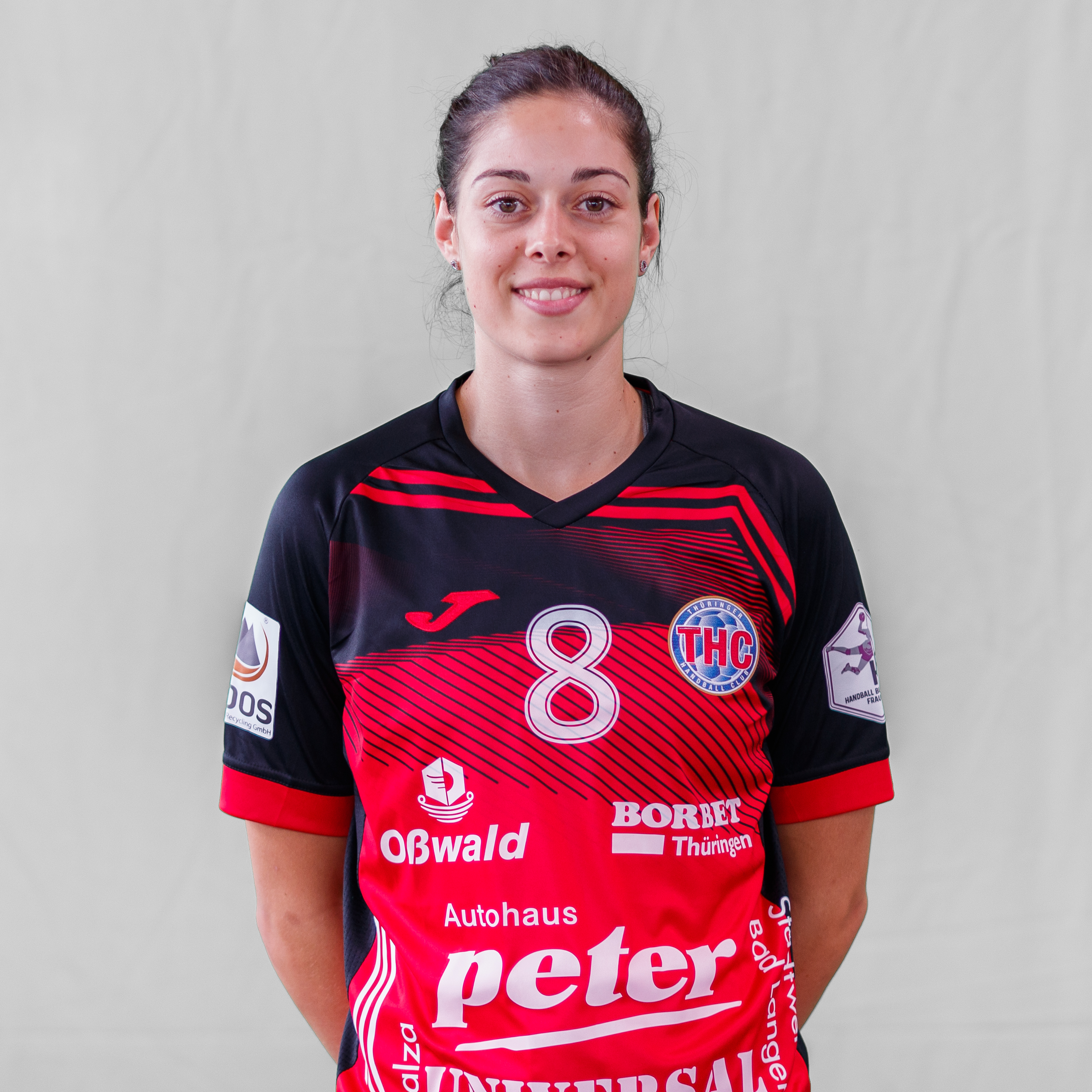

Personal information
- Nationality: Czech
- Born: 4 June 1996 (age 30) Plzeň, Czech Republic
- Height: 1.75 m (5 ft 9 in)

Sport
- Sport: Handball
- Position: Right wing
- Current club: DHK Baník Most
- Number: 88

Senior clubs
- Years: Team
- –: HC Plzeň
- 2014–2021: DHK Baník Most
- 2021–2023: Thüringer HC
- 2023–: DHK Baník Most
National team
Years	Team	Apps	(Gls)
2017–	Czech Republic	79	(148)
- Updated on 7 September 2024

Dominika Zachová (born 4 June 1996) is a Czech handball player for DHK Baník Most and the Czech national team.

She participated at the 2018 European Women's Handball Championship.

== Achievements ==
- Czech First Division:
  - Winner: 2015, 2016, 2017, 2018, 2019
