= Dominika Müllnerová =

Czech handball player

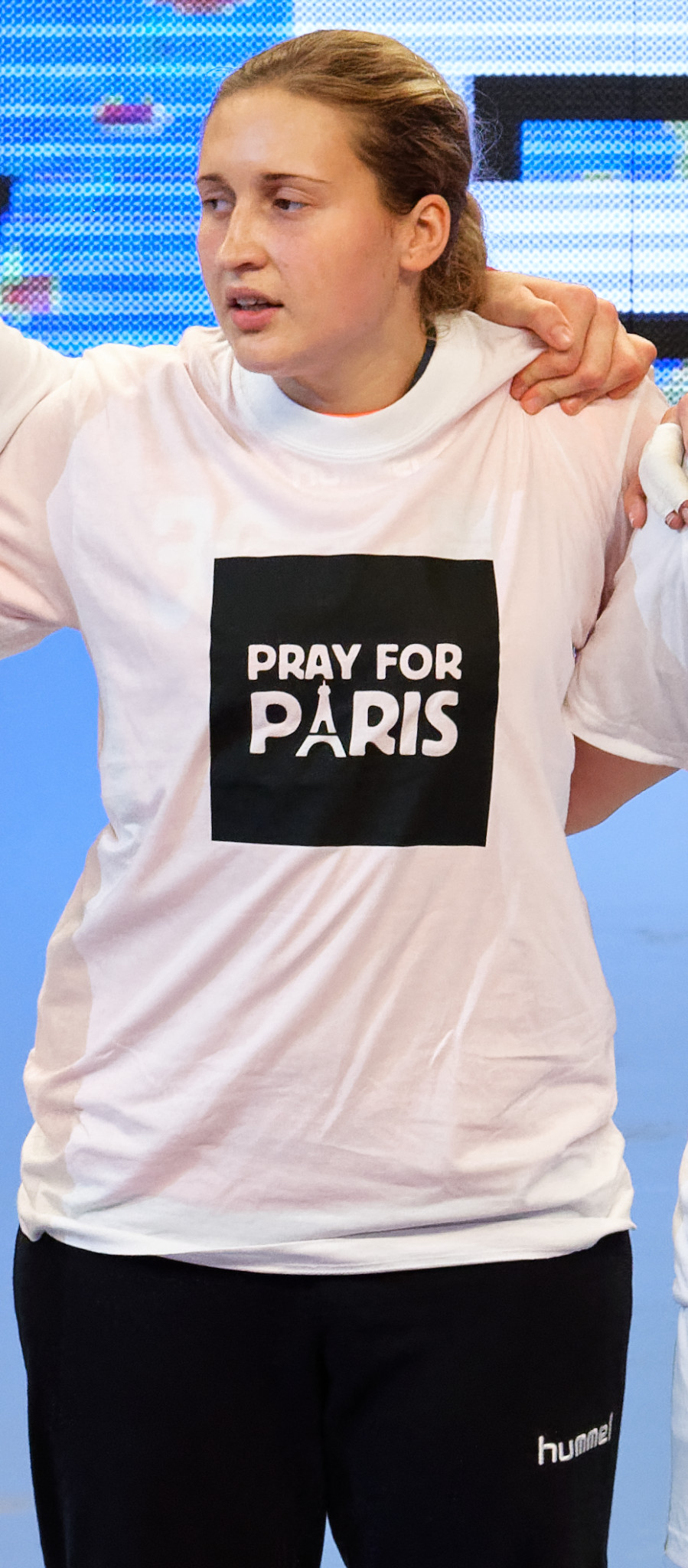

Personal information
- Nationality: Czech
- Born: 26 March 1992 (age 34) Ústí nad Labem, Czechoslovakia
- Height: 1.70 m (5 ft 7 in)

Sport
- Sport: Handball
- Position: Goalkeeper
- Current club: DHK Banik Most
- Number: 31

Senior clubs
- Years: Team
- 2011–: DHK Banik Most
National team
Years	Team	Apps	(Gls)
–	Czech Republic	52	(1)

Dominika Müllnerová (born 26 March 1992) is a Czech handball player for DHK Banik Most and the Czech national team.

She represented the Czech Republic at the 2013 World Women's Handball Championship in Serbia.
