= Iryna Kompaniiets =

Ukrainian handball player

Personal information
- Full name: Iryna Kompaniiets
- Nationality: Ukrainian
- Born: 21 November 1993 (age 32) Kryvyi Rih, Ukraine
- Height: 1.80 m (5 ft 11 in)

Sport
- Sport: Handball
- Position: Left back
- Current club: IUVENTA Michalovce
- Number: 33

Senior clubs
- Years: Team
- 2010–2013: HC Sparta
- 2014–2017: HC Karpaty
- 2017–: IUVENTA Michalovce
National team
- Years: Team
- 2013–: Ukraine

Iryna Kompaniiets (born 21 November 1993) is a Ukrainian handballer who plays as a left back for IUVENTA Michalovce and the Ukrainian national team.

== Achievements ==
- WHIL:
  - Winner: 2019
