= Luxembourg Handball Federation =

Governing body of handball in Luxembourg

Luxembourg Handball Federation French: Fédération Luxembourgeoise de Handball FLH
- IOC nation: Grand Duchy of Luxembourg (LUX)
- Sport: Handball
- Other sports: Beach handball
- Official website: www.flh.lu

HISTORY
- Year of formation: 10 March 1946; 80 years ago

AFFILIATIONS
- International federation: International Handball Federation (IHF)
- IHF member since: 1946 (founder)
- Continental association: European Handball Federation
- National Olympic Committee: Luxembourg Olympic and Sporting Committee

GOVERNING BODY
- President: Dr. Romain Schockmel

HEADQUARTERS
- Address: 3 Route d'Arlon, 8009 Strassen
- Country: Luxembourg
- Secretary General: Christian Schmitt

The Luxembourg Handball Federation (French: Fédération Luxembourgeoise de Handball) (FLH) is the administrative and controlling body for handball and beach handball in Grand Duchy of Luxembourg. Founded in 1946, FLH is a founder member of both the European Handball Federation (EHF) and the International Handball Federation (IHF).

== National teams ==
- Luxembourg men's national handball team
- Luxembourg men's national junior handball team
- Luxembourg women's national handball team

== Competitions ==
- Luxembourg Men's National Division
- Luxembourg Women's National Division
