= Görele Bld. SK (women's handball) =

Turkish handball club

- Founded: 17 October 2017; 8 years ago
- Arena: 13Şubat Sports Hall
- President: Cihan Somuncu
- Head coach: (Turkey) Nesimi Dağdoğan
- League: Turkish Women's Handball Super League
- Club colours

Location of Görele Bld. SK in Turkey

Görele Bld. SK (Turkish: Görele Belediyesi Spor Kulübü) is the women's handball side of the same named club based in Görele of Giresun Province, north eastern Turkey, and sponsored by the district municipality. The team competes in the Turkish Women's Handball Super League. The club was founded on 17 October 2017. Club colors are green,white, red, turquoise and blue. Current club president is Cihan Somuncu.

== Location ==
Görele Bld. SK is located in the Görele City Hall at Hendekbaşı Mah., Salih Sinirlioğlu Cad. 12.

== Arena ==
The team play their league home matches at 13 Şubat Sports Hall located at Yeşiltepe Mah., Şehit Yüzbaşı Temel Kuğuoğlu Blv. 2/1.

== Competitions ==
=== Domestic ===
Görele Bld. SK started to play in the 2017-18 season of the Second Leagıe. In the 2018-19 season, the team was promoted to the First League. They were promotrd to the Super League in the 2020-21 season.

=== International ===
==== EHF European Cup ====
Season A	Round	Club	1st leg	2nd leg	Aggregate
2023–24	Round 2	(Croatia) ŽRK Dugo Selo 55	28–27	23–36	51–63
2024–25	Round 2	(North Macedonia) WHC Metalurg Avtokomanda	36–28	34–37	70–65
2024–25	Round 3	(Austria) WAT Atzgersdorf	32–35	26–35	58–70

== Current squad ==
Team members at the 2024–25 Turkish Women's Handball Super League:

- 2 (Brazil) Vitória de Paula Oliveira (LW)
- 4 (Turkey) Zehra Oğuz (LW)
- 6 (Turkey) İrem Can İnce (RW)
- 7 (Turkey) Nisa Ekiz (LB)
- 8 (Turkey) Ayşenur Kara (RW)
- 9 (Turkey) Sevgi Kalyoncuoğlu (LB)
- 12 (Turkey) Serpil Abdioğlu (GK)
- 14 (Turkey) Gülseren Nehir Günay (GK)
- 17 (Turkey) Fatma Akgün (LP)
- 19 (Turkey) İlayda Gürsoy (LP)
- 20 (Brazil) Melissa Rocha da Silva (CB)
- 28 (Turkey) Semanur Kirman (RW)
- 53 (Turkey) Ecem Birben (LW)
- 59 (Cameroon) Michaella Eunice Magba (RW)
- 76 (Turkey) Gizem Dilek (RB)
- 77 (Turkey) Mehtap Tezkorkmaz (LB)

- GK: Goalkeeper
- LW: Left winger
- RW: Right winger
- LP: Line player
- CB: Center back
- LB: Left back
- RB: Right back
