= Eglė Vilnius =

- Full name: Rankinio Klubas Egle Vilnius
- Founded: 1974; 52 years ago
- Arena: University of Educology, Vilnius
- League: Lithuanian League
- 2022–23: 2nd
- Club colours
Home	Away

RK Eglė Vilnius, also known as Eglė-Šviesa for sponsorship reasons, is a women's handball club from Vilnius, Lithuania. The club has a rich history in both domestic and international competitions.

== History ==
The club was founded in 1974. In the Soviet era, Eglė Vilnius achieved great success, finishing third in the Soviet Championship in 1981 and 1987. The team also reached the final of the EHF Cup twice during this period, in 1982 and 1989. They were unable to lift the trophy, losing to RK Trešnjevka and Chimistul Râmnicu Vâlcea, respectively.

In 1988, Eglė Vilnius finally won their first major international title, the EHF Cup, by defeating Budućnost Titograd in the final. This was a remarkable achievement, and it remains the club's most significant triumph to date.

Following the dissolution of the Soviet Union, Eglė Vilnius faced new challenges as they adapted to a different landscape of handball in Europe. However, the club continued to perform at a high level, and in 1999 they reached the group stage of the EHF Champions League, which was a remarkable achievement for a Lithuanian team.

Their last title was in 2010, after which they have fallen behind HC SM Garliava and MRK Žalgiris Kaunas.

== Titles ==
- EHF Cup
  - Winner: 1988
  - Finalist: 1982 and 1989
- Lithuanian League
  - Winner: 1990, 1991, 1992, 1993, 1994, 1996, 1997, 1998, 2000, 2001, 2002, 2003, 2004, 2006, 2007, 2006, 2007, 2010
  - Second place: 1995, 1996, 1997, 2001, 2003, 2021, 2022, 2023
