= Mediterranean Handball Confederation =

Governing body of handball in the Mediterranean region

Mediterranean Handball Confederation Arabic: اتحاد كرة اليد البحر الأبيض المتوسط French: Confédération méditerranéenne de handball
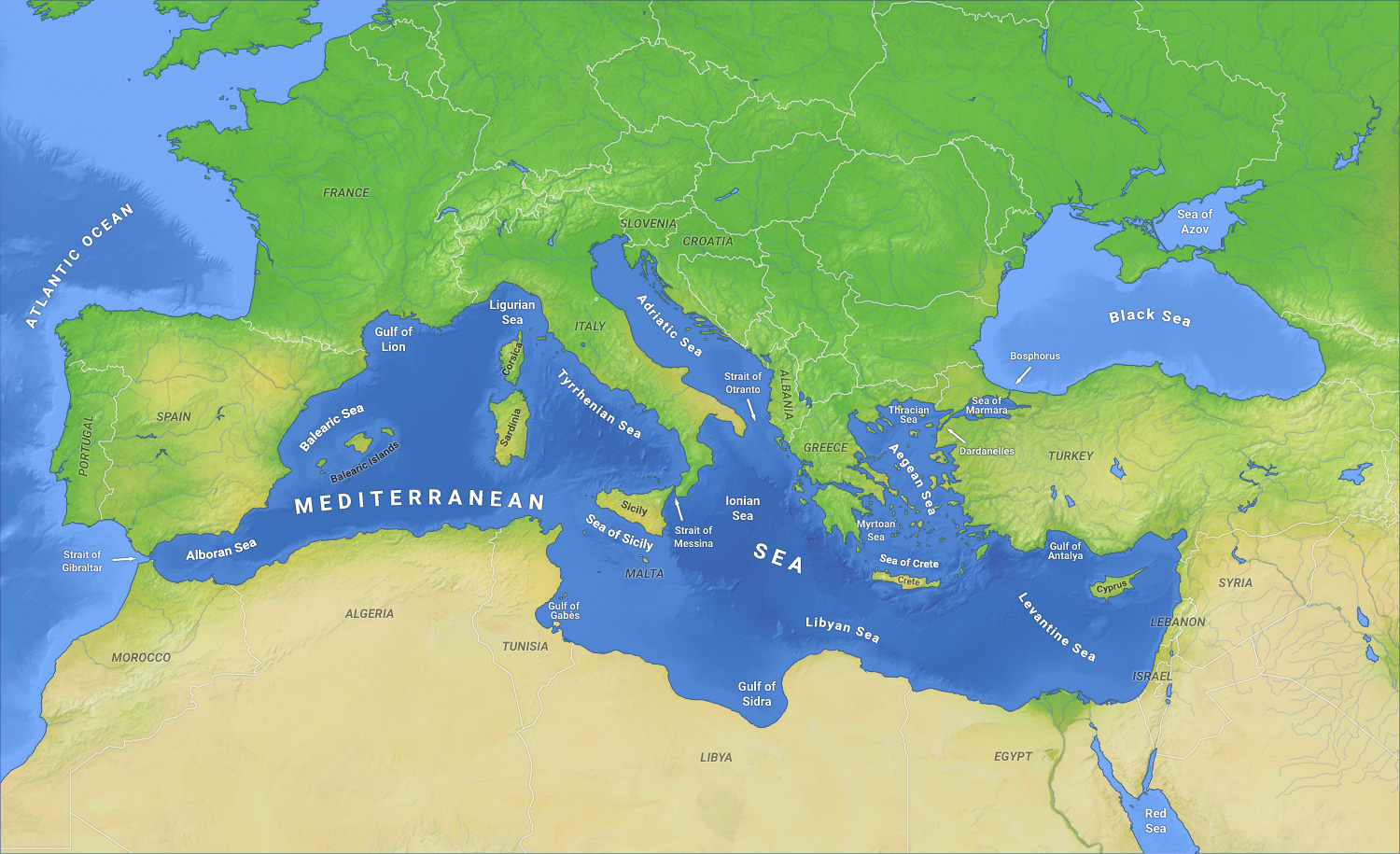
- Map of Mediterranean sea and neighbouring countries
- Abbreviation: MHC
- Founded at: Cairo (Egypt)
- Type: Sports Federation
- Region served: Africa, Asia, Europe
- Members: 22 Full members: Albania; Algeria; Bosnia and Herzegovina; Croatia; Cyprus; Egypt; France; Greece; Israel; Italy; Lebanon; Libya; Malta; Montenegro; Morocco; Portugal; Serbia; Slovenia; Spain; Syria; Tunisia; Turkey; 2 Associated members: Andorra; Monaco
- Official language: English
- President: Mr. Francesco Purromuto (Italy)
- 1st Vice-President: General Charalambos Lottas (Cyprus)
- Vice Presidents: Mr. Zoran Radojičić (Montenegro); Mr. Günal Ensari (Turkey); Mr. Alain Koubi (France)
- Main organ: MHC Congress
- Parent organization: International Handball Federation, International Committee of Mediterranean Games
- Affiliations: African Handball Confederation, Asian Handball Federation, European Handball Federation
- Website: Official Website
- Formerly called: Mediterranean Handball Association

The Mediterranean Handball Confederation (Arabic: اتحاد كرة اليد البحر الأبيض المتوسط; French: Confédération méditerranéenne de handball), officially abbreviated as MHC, is the governing body of handball in the Mediterranean region.

== History ==
On 12 June 1999 in Cairo (Egypt), the Mediterranean Handball Association (MHA) has been established among the following countries: Algeria, Cyprus, Egypt, Greece, Italy, Libya, Morocco, Portugal, Syria, Tunisia, Turkey and Yugoslavia. The first president of MHA was Dr. Hassan Moustafa (Egypt).

On 22 February 2003, in Rome (Italy), the Mediterranean Handball Association decided to change the original name into Mediterranean Handball Confederation and an Executive Committee was elected Francesco Purromuto (Italy) (President), Rui Coelho (Portugal), Jaume Conejero (Spain), Jean Férignac (France), Taoufik Khouaja (Tunisia) and General Charalambos Lottas (Cyprus), having the task to perform all the necessary acts to summon the MHC Congress for the approval of the MHC Rules of procedure, for the election of the Statutory bodies.

The 1st Congress was held on 28 and 29 February 2004, in Castelo Branco (Portugal), and the following countries participate as foundation members: Albania, Cyprus, Egypt, France, Greece, Israel, Libya, Malta, Portugal, Serbia and Montenegro, Slovenia, Spain, Tunisia, Turkey. Each year, the Mediterranean Handball Confederation organises the Mediterranean Men's Handball Championship and Mediterranean Women's Handball Championship on different dates. These competitions are preferably reserved to young athletes.

From 24 to 29 February 2004, the first Mediterranean Men's Handball Championship, was conducted under the aegis of the MHC, in Castelo Branco (Portugal). From 21 to 28 June 2004, the first Mediterranean Women's Handball Championship was held in Misano Adriatico (Italy). The Mediterranean Games with handball as an event were organized for the first time in Tunis 1967 (men's tournament) and Split 1979 (women's tournament).

== MHC Presidents ==
S. No.	Name	Country	Term
1.	Dr. Hassan Moustafa	Egypt	12 June 1999 – 22 February 2003
2.	Mr. Francesco Purromuto	Italy	22 February 2003 – Till date

== MHC Executive Committee ==
The Executive Committee is the Mediterranean Handball Confederation managing Body. It consists of the MHC President and the members elected by the MHC Ordinary Congress for a four-years mandate. The following Executive Committee has been elected, for the term of the office 2015 – 2019, during the 3rd Ordinary Congress in Rome (Italy) in September 2015.

Designation	Name	Country
President	Francesco Purromuto	Italy
1st Vice-President	Charalambos Lottas	Cyprus
Vice-President	Zoran Radojičić	Montenegro
Vice-President	Günal Ensari	Turkey
Vice-President	Alain Koubi	France
Treasurer	Mehdi Khouaja	Tunisia
Member	Francisco Vidal Blázquez García	Spain
Member	Leon Kalin	Slovenia
Member	Hesham Nasr Soliman Ahmed	Egypt
Member	Siniša Ostoić	Croatia
Member	Konstantinos Violitzis	Greece

== MHC Tournaments ==
- Mediterranean Men's Handball Championship from 2004.
- Mediterranean Women's Handball Championship from 2004.
- Handball at the Mediterranean Games from 1967 (Men's) and 1979 (Women's).
- Beach Handball at the Mediterranean Beach Games from 2015.

== Women's Mediterranean Handball Championships ==
From 2004 (2005 and 2014 was not held):

Number	Year	Host City	Host Country	Teams
1	2004	Misano Adriatico	Italy	
2	2006	Tivat / Budva	Montenegro	
3	2007	Paris	France	
4	2008	Mersin	Turkey	
5	2009	Lignano Sabbiadoro	Italy	
6	2010	Ploče	Croatia	
7	2011	Mestrino	Italy	
8	2012	Eilat	Israel	
9	2013	Budva	Montenegro	
10	2015	Nabeul / Hammamet	Tunisia	
11	2016	Žabljak	Montenegro	
12	2017	Nabeul	Tunisia	
13	2018			
14	2019			
15	2020			

== Men's Mediterranean Handball Championships ==
From 2004:

Number	Year	Host City	Host Country	Teams
1	2004	Castelo Branco	Portugal	
2	2005	Katerini	Greece	
3	2006	Loutraki	Greece	
4	2007	Larnaca	Cyprus	
5	2008	Port Said	Egypt	
6	2009	Mahdia	Tunisia	
7	2010	Bar	Montenegro	
8	2011	Trabzon	Turkey	
9	2012	Lagoa	Portugal	
10	2013	Nabeul / Hammamet	Tunisia	
11	2014	Chieti	Italy	
12	2015	Pescara	Italy	
13	2016	Alexandria	Egypt	
14	2017	Paris	France	
15	2018	Marrakesh	Morocco	
16	2019	Port Said	Egypt	
17	2020	Athens	Greece	

== Current title holders ==
=== Handball ===
Tournament	Men	Women
Mediterranean Handball Championship	Spain (2019) (1)	Romania (2017) (1)
Mediterranean Games	Croatia (2018) (4)	Spain (2018) (2)

• (Titles) (*) Record

=== Beach Handball ===
Tournament	Men	Women
Mediterranean Beach Games	Greece (2019) (1*)	Greece (2019) (1*)

• (Titles) (*) Record

== MHC Members ==
Full Members

- Albania
- Algeria
- Bosnia and Herzegovina
- Croatia
- Cyprus
- Egypt
- France
- Greece
- Israel
- Italy
- Lebanon
- Libya
- Malta
- Montenegro
- Morocco
- Portugal
- Serbia
- Slovenia
- Spain
- Syria
- Tunisia
- Turkey

Associated Members

- Andorra
- Monaco

Kuwait, Saudi Arabia and Bahrain competed in 2020 Men's Mediterranean Handball Championships.

== See also ==
- Mediterranean
- Mediterranean Sea
- Mediterranean Games
- Mediterranean Beach Games
- Balkan Handball Championships from 1979.
