= DHC Slavia Prague =

Handball club in Prague, Czech Republic

- Full name: DHC Slavia Prague
- Founded: 1919
- Arena: Hala Eden, Prague
- Capacity: 1,200
- President: Richard Toman
- Head coach: Jan Salač
- League: MOL Liga; Czech League
- 2021–22: 9th 5th
- Club colours
Home	Away

DHC Slavia Prague the Czech women's handball section of Czech omnisport club SK Slavia Prague. It was established in 1919. They are currently competing in the MOL Liga and the Czech Women's Handball League.

The team won four Czechoslovak championships between 1926 and 1935. In 1960 Slavia, which had its name changed to Dynamo Prague between 1949 and 1965, won its fifth title and became the first team to represent Czechoslovakia in the newly founded European Cup where it reached the final, losing to Stiinta Bucharest. Three decades later the team won two of the last three editions of the Czechoslovak championship.

Following the dissolution of Czechoslovakia Slavia has competed in the Czech First Division and, from 2002, in the WHIL, a supranational league comprised by the leading Czech and Slovak clubs. The team won seven Czech championships between 1994 and 2010, and it has also won the WHIL in 2010 and 2011. Its major international success in the modern era was reaching the semifinals of the EHF Cup in 2001.

== Titles ==
Former club logo

- Czechoslovak Championship
  - 1926, 1929, 1933, 1935, 1960, 1991, 1993
- WHIL
  - 2010, 2011
- Czech First Division
  - 1994, 1999, 2000, 2001, 2002, 2007, 2010, 2023

== European record ==
Season	Competition	Round	Club	1st leg	2nd leg	Aggregate
2016–17	EHF Cup	R1	(Sweden) Skuru IK	22–26	23–18	45–44
2016–17	EHF Cup	R2	(Denmark) Viborg HK	23–29	22–36	45–65

== Team ==
=== Current squad ===
Squad for the 2022–23 season

Goalkeepers

- 1 (Czech Republic) Vendula Vrbková
- 27 (Czech Republic) Michaela Malá
- 33 (Czech Republic) Petra Kudláčková
- 88 (Czech Republic) Martina Koudelková

Wingers
LW

- 8 (Czech Republic) Tereza Mulacová
- 13 (Czech Republic) Vendula Frycáková
- 22 (Czech Republic) Eliška Jirásková
- 24 (Czech Republic) Barbora Doležalová

RW

- 5 (Czech Republic) Nikola Motejlová
- 26 (Czech Republic) Nikola Švihnosová

Line players

- 15 (Czech Republic) Adéla Zimová
- 19 (Czech Republic) Adriana Míšová
- 38 (Czech Republic) Barbora Vavroušková

Back players
LB

- 9 (Czech Republic) Tereza Vostárková
- 10 (Czech Republic) Adéla Novotná
- 30 (Czech Republic) Martina Weisenbilderová

CB

- 4 (Czech Republic) Julie Franková
- 7 (Czech Republic) Alexandra Koubová
- 25 (Romania) Iulia Stefan Borcan
- 44 (Czech Republic) Katarina Mydlová
- 77 (Czech Republic) Adéla Mazánková

RB

- 17 (Slovakia) Veronika Duranková

==== Transfers ====
Transfers for the 2023–24 season

Joining

Leaving

=== Staff members ===
Staff for the 2022-23 season.

- (Czech Republic) Head Coach: Jan Salač
- (Czech Republic) Assistant Coach: Petra Freislerová
- (Czech Republic) Team Leader: Jana Vasilevová
- (Czech Republic) Physiotherapist: Klára Nožičková
- (Czech Republic) Physiotherapist: Dušan Kužehuba
