= Mourad Boussebt =

Algerian handball player and administrator (born 1960)

Personal information
- Nationality: Algerian
- Born: 19 May 1960 (age 66)

Sport
- Sport: Handball

Mourad Boussebt (born 19 May 1960) is an Algerian handball player. He competed at the 1984 Summer Olympics and the 1988 Summer Olympics. From 6 March 2025 on, he is the acting president of the Algerian Handball Federation. In 2026 he was elected as Algeria's representative at the Arab Handball Union.
