= DHK Baník Most =

Czech handball club

- Nickname(s): Černí andělé (Black Angels)
- Founded: 1997
- Arena: Sportovní hala, Most
- Capacity: 1,400
- President: Pavla Chotěborská
- Head coach: Vladimír Šuma
- League: MOL Liga
- 2024–25: 1st
- Club colours
Home	Away

DHK Baník Most is a professional women's handball club from Most, Czech Republic. In the 2019–20 season they made history by qualifying for the EHF Champions League group stage. The nickname for the team is "Černí andělé" (Black Angels). They competed again in the 2022–23 Women's EHF Champions League.

== European record ==
Season	Competition	Round	Club	1st leg	2nd leg	Aggregate
2019–20	EHF Champions League	QF	(Spain) Gran Canaria	28–21		
2019–20	EHF Champions League	QF	(Turkey) Kastamonu GSK	35–33		
2019–20	EHF Champions League	Group Stage; Group D	(Hungary) Győri ETO	21–46	29–35	4th
2019–20	EHF Champions League	Group Stage; Group D	(Slovenia) Krim Ljubljana	26–31	31–29	4th
2019–20	EHF Champions League	Group Stage; Group D	(Sweden) Sävehof	25–25	19–24	4th
2019–20	EHF Cup	Group Stage (Group A)	(Turkey) Kastamonu GSK	28–31	27–33	4th
2019–20	EHF Cup	Group Stage (Group A)	(Germany) Thüringer HC	27–35	24–40	4th
2019–20	EHF Cup	Group Stage (Group A)	(Hungary) DVSC Schaeffler	28–29	29–36	4th
2020–21	EHF European League	Qual. Round 3	(Hungary) Váci NKSE	41–42		
2021–22	EHF European League	Qual. Round 3	(Romania) Măgura Cisnădie	26–27	26–25	52–52 (a)
2022–23	EHF Champions League	Group A	(Denmark) Odense Håndbold	22–41	19–37	8th
2022–23	EHF Champions League	Group A	(Norway) Vipers Kristiansand	21–43	24–39	8th
2022–23	EHF Champions League	Group A	(Slovenia) RK Krim Mercator	29–42	31–42	8th
2022–23	EHF Champions League	Group A	(Germany) SG BBM Bietigheim	23–46	25–47	8th
2022–23	EHF Champions League	Group A	(France) Brest Bretagne Handball	26–31	30–46	8th
2022–23	EHF Champions League	Group A	(Hungary) FTC-Rail Cargo Hungaria	27–46	19–43	8th
2022–23	EHF Champions League	Group A	(Romania) CSM București	25–40	26–35	8th

== Results ==
=== National ===
- Czech First Division: 11
  - Gold: 2013, 2014, 2015, 2016, 2017, 2018, 2019, 2021, 2022, 2024, 2025
- Czech Cup: 11
  - Gold: 2014, 2015, 2016, 2017, 2018, 2020, 2022, 2023, 2024, 2025, 2026
- WHIL: 3
  - Gold: 2013, 2018, 2021

=== International ===
- EHF Challenge Cup:
  - Gold: 2013

== Team ==
=== Current squad ===
Squad for the 2023–24 season

Goalkeepers

- 21 (Netherlands) Ellen Janssen
- 31 (Czech Republic) Dominika Müllnerová
- 32 (Czech Republic) Jana Kašparová

Wingers
LW

- 9 (Czech Republic) Adéla Stříšková
- 22 (Slovakia) Lucia Mikulčík
- 71 (Czech Republic) Sofie Behenská

RW

- 33 (Czech Republic) Tereza Eksteinová
- 73 (Czech Republic) Barbora Kroftová
- 88 (Czech Republic) Dominika Zachová

Line players

- 8 (Czech Republic) Michaela Holanová
- 91 (Poland) Daria Somionka

Back players
LB

- 4 (Hungary) Eszter Ogonovszky
- 11 (Czech Republic) Veronika Andrýsková
- 14 (Slovakia) Tatiana Šutranová
- 16 (Czech Republic) Ema Veselovská
- 17 (Czech Republic) Adéla Pokorná
- 28 (Czech Republic) Adéla Protivová

CB

- 24 (Czech Republic) Valentina Schüllerová
- 81 (Slovakia) Katarina Kostelná
- 96 (Czech Republic) Veronika Mikulášková

RB

- 38 (Czech Republic) Valeria Smetková
- 74 (Czech Republic) Marie Poláková

==== Transfers ====
Transfers for the 2024–25 season

Joining

Leaving

- (Hungary) Eszter Ogonovszky (LB) (on loan back to (Hungary) Győri Audi ETO KC)
