= Lithuanian Women's Handball League =

- Founded: 1990 (unofficial); 1992 (official)
- No. of teams: 9
- Country: Lithuania
- Confederation: EHF
- Most recent champion: MRK Žalgiris Kaunas (6th title)
- Most titles: Eglė Vilnius (20 titles)
- Website: www.moterurankinis.lt/

The Lithuanian Women's Handball League (Lithuanian: Lietuvos moterų rankinio lyga), is the top-tier team handball competition in the Republic of Lithuania. It was founded in 1992 after the break up of the Soviet Union, which meant the Soviet handball league was removed.

== Champions ==
=== Winners by season ===
Season	Champion
1989–90	Eglė Vilnius
1990–91	Eglė Vilnius
1991–92	Eglė Vilnius
1992–93	Eglė Vilnius
1993–94	Eglė Vilnius
1994–95	Eglė Vilnius
1995–96	Eglė Vilnius
1996–97	Eglė Vilnius
1997–98	Eglė Vilnius
1998–99	Eastcon AG Vilnius
1999–00	Eglė Vilnius
2000–01	Eglė Vilnius
2001–02	Eglė Vilnius
2002–03	Eglė Vilnius
2003–04	Eglė Vilnius
2004–05	Eastcon AG Vilnius
2005–06	Eglė Vilnius
2006–07	Eglė Vilnius
2007–08	Eastcon AG Vilnius
2009–10	Eglė Vilnius
2010–11	HC SM Garliava
2011–12	MRK Žalgiris Kaunas
2012–13	MRK Žalgiris Kaunas
2013-14	MRK Žalgiris Kaunas
2014-15	MRK Žalgiris Kaunas
2015–16	MRK Žalgiris Kaunas
2016–17	HC SM Garliava
2017–18	MRK Žalgiris Kaunas
2018–19	HC SM Garliava
2019–20	Cancelled
2020–21	HC SM Garliava
2021–22	MRK Žalgiris Kaunas
2022–23	HC SM Garliava
2023–24	HC SM Garliava
2024–25	HC SM Garliava
