= Handball Club Berchem =

HC Berchem
- Full name: Handball Club Berchem
- Founded: 1962
- Arena: Hall Omnisports de Crauthem
- Head coach: Marko Stupar
- League: Sales Lentz League
- 2023–2024: 1st
| Home | Away |

Handball Club Berchem is a men's handball club from Berchem, Luxembourg, that plays in the Luxembourgish Handball League. The club is one of the most successful in Luxembourg with 7 league titles and 12 cups.

== Titles ==
- Luxembourgish Handball League:
  - Winner: 1994-95, 1999-00, 2000-01, 2004-05, 2005-06, 2010-11, 2023-24
- Luxembourg Cup:
  - Winner: 1979-80, 1982-83, 1993-94, 1996-97, 2002-03, 2004-05, 2006-07, 2008-09, 2009-10, 2017-18, 2020-21, 2024-25

== Notable former players ==
- (Poland) Andrzej Szymczak
- (Poland) Ariel Pietrasik
