= Luxembourg National Division (men's handball) =

- Sport: Handball
- Founded: 1936
- No. of teams: 8
- Country: Luxembourg
- Confederation: EHF
- Most recent champion: Red Boys Differdange
- Most titles: HB Dudelange (23 titles)
- International cups: EHF Cup; EHF Challenge Cup
- Website: http://www.flh.lu

The Luxembourg AXA League is the name of the professional handball league of Luxembourg.

== Competition format ==
The season begins with a tournament between the eights teams. The first six teams qualify for the play-offs, while the last two plays play-downs.

== 2025/26 Season participants ==
The following 8 clubs compete in the Sales Lentz League during the 2025–26 season.

Team	City	Arena
Red Boys Differdange	Differdange	Parc des Sports
CHEV Diekirch	Diekirch	Hall Sportif Diekirch
HB Dudelange	Dudelange	René Hartmann Sport Center
HB Esch	Esch-sur-Alzette	Henri Schmitz Sport Center
Handball Käerjeng	Käerjeng	Käerjenger Dribbel Sport Center
HC Standard	Bonnevoie	Centre Sportif Bonnevoie
HC Berchem	Roeser	Crauthem Hall Omnisports
Espérance Rumelange	Rumelange	Centre Sportif Rumelange

== National Division Champions ==
Champions are:

- 1937 : HB Eschois Fola
- 1938 : HB Eschois Fola (2)
- 1940 : HB Eschois Fola (3)
- 1942 : HBC Schifflange
- 1944 : HB Eschois Fola (4)
- 1946 : HB Eschois Fola (5)
- 1948 : HC La Fraternelle Esch
- 1950 : HB Eschois Fola (6)
- 1952 : HB Eschois Fola (7)
- 1953 : HB Eschois Fola (8)
- 1954 : HB Eschois Fola (9)
- 1955 : Red Boys Differdange
- 1956 : CA Dudelange
- 1957 : CA Dudelange (2)
- 1958 : Red Boys Differdange (2)
- 1959 : CA Dudelange (3)
- 1960 : HB Eschois Fola (10)
- 1961 : HB Eschois Fola (11)
- 1962 : HB Dudelange
- 1963 : HB Eschois Fola (12)
- 1964 : HB Dudelange (2)
- 1965 : HB Dudelange (3)
- 1966 : HB Dudelange (4)
- 1967 : HB Dudelange (5)
- 1968 : HB Dudelange (6)
- 1969 : HB Dudelange (7)
- 1970 : HB Dudelange (8)
- 1971 : HB Dudelange (9)
- 1972 : HB Dudelange (10)
- 1973 : HB Dudelange (11)
- 1974 : HB Eschois Fola (13)
- 1975 : HB Eschois Fola (14)
- 1976 : HB Dudelange (12)
- 1977 : HB Dudelange (13)
- 1978 : HB Eschois Fola (15)
- 1979 : HB Eschois Fola (16)
- 1980 : HB Dudelange (14)
- 1981 : HB Dudelange (15)
- 1982 : HBC Schifflange (2)
- 1983 : HB Eschois Fola (17)
- 1984 : HB Dudelange (16)
- 1985 : HB Dudelange (17)
- 1986 : HB Dudelange (18)
- 1987 : HB Eschois Fola (18)
- 1988 : HB Eschois Fola (19)
- 1989 : HB Eschois Fola (20)
- 1990 : Red Boys Differdange (3)
- 1991 : Red Boys Differdange (4)
- 1992 : HB Dudelange (19)
- 1993 : CHEV Handball Diekirch
- 1994 : HB Echternach
- 1995 : HC Berchem
- 1996 : HC La Fraternelle Esch (2)
- 1997 : Red Boys Differdange (5)
- 1998 : Red Boys Differdange (6)
- 1999 : Red Boys Differdange (7)
- 2000 : HC Berchem (2)
- 2001 : HC Berchem (3)
- 2002 : HB Esch
- 2003 : HB Esch (2)
- 2004 : HB Esch (3)
- 2005 : HC Berchem (4)
- 2006 : HC Berchem (5)
- 2007 : HB Esch (4)
- 2008 : HB Dudelange (20)
- 2009 : HB Dudelange (21)
- 2010 : HB Esch (5)
- 2011 : HC Berchem (6)
- 2012 : HB Dudelange (22)
- 2013 : HB Esch (6)
- 2014 : Handball Käerjeng
- 2015 : HB Dudelange (23)
- 2016 : Red Boys Differdange (8)
- 2017 : HB Esch (7)
- 2018 : Handball Käerjeng (2)
- 2019 : HB Esch (8)
- 2021 : HB Esch (9)
- 2022 : HB Esch (10)
- 2023 : HB Esch (11)
- 2024 : HC Berchem (7)
- 2025 : Red Boys Differdange (9)
- 2026 : Red Boys Differdange (10)

	Club	Titles	Year
1.	HB Dudelange	23	1962, 1964, 1965, 1966, 1967, 1968, 1969, 1970, 1971, 1972, 1973, 1976, 1977, 1980, 1981, 1984, 1985, 1986, 1992, 2008, 2009, 2012, 2015
2.	HB Eschois Fola	20	1937, 1938, 1940, 1944, 1946, 1950, 1952, 1953, 1954, 1960, 1961, 1963, 1974, 1975, 1978, 1979, 1983, 1987, 1988, 1989
3.	HB Esch	11	2002, 2003, 2004, 2007, 2010, 2013, 2017, 2019, 2021, 2022, 2023
4.	Red Boys Differdange	10	1955, 1958, 1990, 1991, 1997, 1998, 1999, 2016, 2025, 2026
5.	HC Berchem	7	1995, 2000, 2001, 2005, 2006, 2011, 2024
6.	CA Dudelange	3	1956, 1957, 1959
7.	HBC Schifflange	2	1942, 1982
	HC La Fraternelle Esch	2	1948, 1996
	Handball Käerjeng	2	2014, 2018
10.	CHEV Handball Diekirch	1	1993
	HB Echternach	1	1994

== EHF coefficient ranking ==
For season 2024/2025, see footnote

EHF European Cup

- 7. (31) (Austria) HLA Meisterliga (17.00)
- 8. (9) (Turkey) Süper Ligi (16.00)
- 9. (6) (Luxembourg) AXA League (14.00)
- 10. (10) (Bosnia and Herzegovina) Premijer liga BiH (13.67)
- 11. (7) (Israel) Ligat Winner (12.67)
