= Women Handball International League =

Supranational championship of women's handball in the Czech Republic and Slovakia

Women Handball International League MOL Liga
- Founded: 2002
- Countries: Czech Republic; Slovakia
- Confederation: ČZH; SZH
- Number of clubs: 12
- Level on pyramid: 1
- International cup(s): EHF European League; EHF European Cup
- Current champions: HC DAC Dunajská Streda (3)
- Most championships: Iuventa Michalovce (11)
- Website: ,
- Current: 2024–25

Women Handball International League (WHIL), also known as Czech-Slovak Interliga or for sponsorships reasons MOL Liga, is a supranational championship created in 2002 that serves as the highest women's handball league in the Czech Republic and Slovakia. Following the end of the championship the four best-placed teams from each country play separate play-offs to determine the national champions. The inaugural edition was also contested (and won) by Hypo Niederösterreich from Austria.

The number of teams in the WHIL has ranged from eleven in 2005 and 2009 to fourteen in 2011. As of the 2024–25 season, it is currently contested by twelve teams – nine from the Czech Republic and three from Slovakia. After Austria's win in its only appearance, Slovakia dominated the following six seasons, while the Czech Republic has won the next four editions. Iuventa Michalovce is the most successful team in the competition with eleven titles, followed by DHK Baník Most and DAC Dunajská Streda with three titles as well as Slavia Prague and Slovan Duslo Šaľa with two titles each.

== 2024–25 season participants ==
Location of clubs in the 2024–25 MOL Liga

The following 12 clubs compete in the MOL Liga during the 2024–25 season.

Team	City	Arena	Finishing pos. in last season 2023/24	Top division titles
(Slovakia) IUVENTA Michalovce	Michalovce	Chemkostav Arena	1st place, gold medalist(s)	11
(Slovakia) HC DAC Dunajská Streda	Dunajská Streda	Mestská športová hala	2nd place, silver medalist(s)	2
(Czech Republic) DHK Baník Most	Most	Sportovní hala	3rd place, bronze medalist(s)	3
(Czech Republic) Házená Kynžvart	Cheb, Lázně Kynžvart	Lokomotiva D-PRODUKT Aréna, Sportovní hala Milana Prokeše	4th	0
(Czech Republic) DHC Slavia Prague	Prague	Hala Eden	5th	2
(Czech Republic) TJ Sokol Písek	Písek	Oblouková hala	6th	0
(Czech Republic) DHK Zora Olomouc	Olomouc	Sportovní hala DHK ZORA	7th	0
(Slovakia) HK Slovan Duslo Šaľa	Šaľa	Mestská športová hala	8th	2
(Czech Republic) DHC Plzeň	Plzeň	Hala 31. ZŠ Plzeň	9th	0
(Czech Republic) HC Zlín	Zlín	Sportovní hala DATART	10th	0
(Czech Republic) DHC Sokol Poruba	Ostrava	Hala Sareza	11th	0
(Czech Republic) HK Hodonín	Hodonín	Sportovní hala v Hodoníně	12th	0

== WHIL Champions ==
- 2003: (Austria) Hypo Niederösterreich
- 2004: (Slovakia) HK Slovan Duslo Šaľa
- 2005: (Slovakia) Iuventa Michalovce
- 2006: (Slovakia) Iuventa Michalovce (2)
- 2007: (Slovakia) Iuventa Michalovce (3)
- 2008: (Slovakia) HK Slovan Duslo Šaľa (2)
- 2009: (Slovakia) Iuventa Michalovce (4)
- 2010: (Czech Republic) Slavia Prague
- 2011: (Czech Republic) Slavia Prague (2)
- 2012: (Czech Republic) HK Veselí nad Moravou
- 2013: (Czech Republic) Baník Most
- 2014: (Slovakia) Iuventa Michalovce (5)
- 2015: (Slovakia) Iuventa Michalovce (6)
- 2016: (Slovakia) Iuventa Michalovce (7)
- 2017: (Slovakia) Iuventa Michalovce (8)
- 2018: (Czech Republic) Baník Most (2)
- 2019: (Slovakia) Iuventa Michalovce (9)
- 2020: Not awarded
- 2021: (Czech Republic) Baník Most (3)
- 2022: (Slovakia) Iuventa Michalovce (10)
- 2023: (Slovakia) HC DAC Dunajská Streda
- 2024: (Slovakia) Iuventa Michalovce (11)
- 2025: (Slovakia) HC DAC Dunajská Streda (2)
- 2026: (Slovakia) HC DAC Dunajská Streda (3)

	Club	Titles	Year
1	(Slovakia) Iuventa Michalovce	11	2005, 2006, 2007, 2009, 2014, 2015, 2016, 2017, 2019, 2022, 2024
2	(Czech Republic) Baník Most	3	2013, 2018, 2021
	(Slovakia) HC DAC Dunajská Streda	3	2023, 2025, 2026
4	(Slovakia) HK Slovan Duslo Šaľa	2	2004, 2008
	(Czech Republic) Slavia Prague	2	2010, 2011
6	(Austria) Hypo Niederösterreich	1	2003
	(Czech Republic) HK Veselí nad Moravou	1	2012
