= DHK Zora Olomouc =

Czech women's handball club

- Founded: 1919
- Arena: Sportovní Hala
- Capacity: 600
- President: Vítězslav Růžička
- Head coach: Libor Malínek
- League: Czech First Division
- 2022–23: 3rd

DHK Zora Olomouc is a women's handball club from Olomouc, Czech Republic.

== Results ==
=== National ===
- Czech First Division:
  - Gold: 2003, 2004, 2008
- Czechoslovak Women's Handball Championship:
  - Gold: 1967
