= SM Tauras-Vilniaus kolegija =

- Full name: Sporto mokykla Tauras-Vilnius kolegija Vilnius
- Short name: SM Tauras-Vilniaus kolegija
- Arena: Tauras Handball Hall
- League: LWHL
- Club colours

SM Tauras-Vilniaus kolegija (formerly Eastcon AG Vilnius) is a women's team handball club from Vilnius, Lithuania. Currently club is competing in Lithuanian Handball League.

== Accomplishments ==
- LWHL:1st
  - 1999, 2005, 2008
