= MRK Žalgiris Kaunas =

- Full name: Moterų Rankinio Klubas Žalgiris Kaunas
- Short name: Žalgiris Kaunas
- Founded: 1944; 81 years ago
- League: A Lyga
- Club colours
Home	Away

Moterų Rankinio Klubas Žalgiris Kaunas is a Lithuanian women's handball club from Kaunas.

A founding member of the European Cup in 1961, Žalgiris won three editions in a row between 1967 and 1969 in addition to two Soviet Championships, which makes it one of the most successful Lithuanian teams in overall international competitions. However the team declined subsequently, with Spartak Kyiv dominating both competitions for nearly two decades. In 1979 Žalgiris made it into the championship's top three for the last time, with Egle Vilnius becoming the major Lithuanian team in the championship.

Since the break-up of the Soviet Union Žalgiris has played in the Lithuanian League.

== Titles ==
- European Cup
  - 1967, 1968, 1969
- Soviet Championship
  - 1966, 1967
- Lithuanian League
  - 2012, 2013, 2014, 2015, 2016, 2018

== European record ==
Season	Competition	Round	Club	1st leg	2nd leg	Aggregate
2012–13	Challenge Cup	R3	(Czech Republic) DHK Baník Most	25–29	25–35	50–64
2013–14	EHF Cup	R2	(Ukraine) HC Karpaty	27–42	23–28	50–70
2014–15	EHF Cup Winners' Cup	R2	(Belarus) BNTU Minsk	23–28	20–32	42–60
2015–16	EHF Cup	R2	(Switzerland) SPONO Eagles	35–25	27–38	62–63
2016–17	EHF Cup	R1	(Turkey) Muratpaşa Belediyespor SK	27–30	24–25	51–55
2017–18	Challenge Cup	R3	(United Kingdom) London GD Handball Club	42–13	32–21	51–55
2017–18	Challenge Cup	1/8	(Spain) Rincón Fertilidad Málaga	28–24	20–25	48–49
2018–19	Challenge Cup	R3	(Belarus) HC Gomel	31–35	26–30	57–65
