= Italian Handball Federation =

Sports governing body in Italy

Italian Handball Federation Federazione Italiana Giuoco Handball (Italian) FIGH
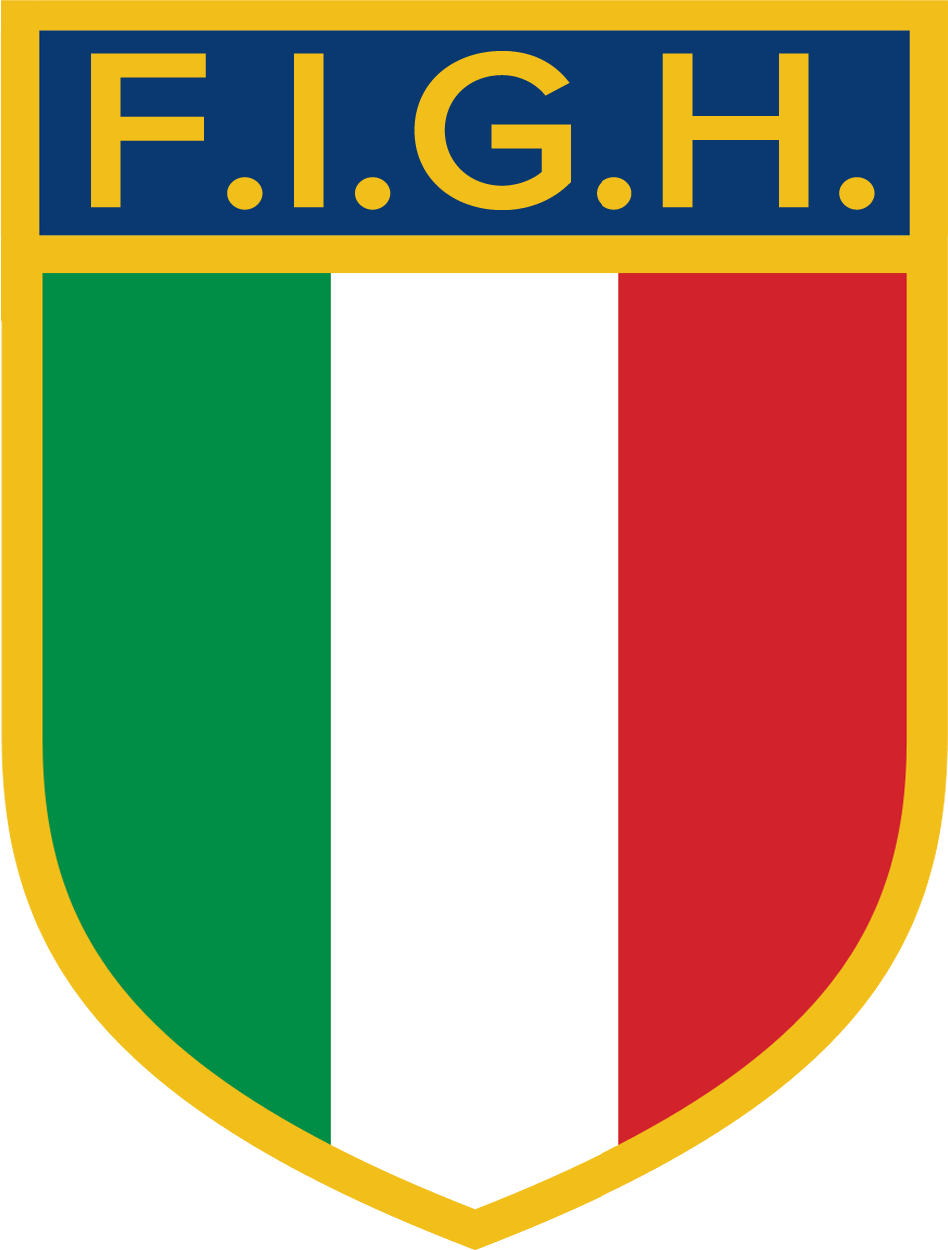
- IOC nation: Italian Republic
- Sport: Handball
- Other sports: Beach handball; Wheelchair handball
- Official website: www.federhandball.it

HISTORY
- Year of formation: 1969

DEMOGRAPHICS
- Membership size: 21

AFFILIATIONS
- International federation: International Handball Federation (IHF)
- IHF member since: 1968
- Continental association: European Handball Federation
- National Olympic Committee: Italian National Olympic Committee
- Other affiliation(s): Mediterranean Handball Confederation

GOVERNING BODY
- President: Dr. Stefano Podini (Italy)

HEADQUARTERS
- Address: Stadio Olimpico (Curva Nord), Rome
- Country: Italy
- Secretary General: Mr. Adriano Ruocco

The Italian Handball Federation (FIGH) (Italian: Federazione Italiana Giuoco Handball) is the governing body of handball and beach handball in Italy. FIGH has been affiliated with the Italian National Olympic Committee (CONI), European Handball Federation (EHF) and International Handball Federation (IHF) since 1968.

== Presidents ==
S.No.	Name	Tenure
	Eugenio Enrile (Founding Committee)	1967 – 1968
1.	Mario Costantini	1969 – 1972
2.	Eugenio Marinello	1972 – 1976
3.	Concetto Lo Bello (Died in office)	1976 – 1991
4.	Ralf Dejaco (Resigned)	1991 – 1994
5.	Piero Jaci	1994 – 1997
6.	Francesco Purromuto	1997 – 2017
7.	Pasquale Loria	2017 – 2023
8.	Francesca Macioce (Commissioner)	2023 – 2024
9.	Stefano Podini	2024 – Present

== Secretaries general ==
S.No.	Name	Tenure
1.	Aurelio Chiappero	1969 – 1973
2.	Giuseppe Gentile	1974 – 1980
3.	Franco Bimbi	1981 – 1982
4.	Tiziano Petracca	1982 – 1984
5.	Pier Luigi Gatti	1984 – 1993
6.	Alessandro Rossi	1993 – 1996
7.	Giuseppe Gentile	1996 – 1997
8.	Sandro Rossi	1997 – 1998
9.	Umberto Desideri	1998 – 1999
10.	Nicola Bozzi	1999 – 2000
11.	Adriano Ruocco	2002 – present

== Tournaments ==
- Serie A1 (Men's)
- Serie A1 (Women's)
- Serie A2 (Men's)
- Serie A2 (Women's)

== National teams ==
=== Handball ===
- Italy men's national handball team
- Italy men's national junior handball team
- Italy men's national youth handball team
- Italy women's national handball team
- Italy women's national junior handball team
- Italy women's national youth handball team

=== Beach Handball ===
- Italy national beach handball team
- Italy women's national beach handball team
