= Bulgarian Handball Federation =

Handball Federation from Bulgaria

Bulgarian Handball Federation Bulgarian: Българска федерация по хандбал BHF
- IOC nation: Republic of Bulgaria (BUL)
- Sport: Handball
- Other sports: Beach handball; Wheelchair handball
- Official website: www.bulgarianhandball.eu

HISTORY
- Year of formation: 1958; 68 years ago

AFFILIATIONS
- International federation: International Handball Federation (IHF)
- IHF member since: 1964
- Continental association: European Handball Federation
- National Olympic Committee: Bulgarian Olympic Committee

GOVERNING BODY
- President: Mr. Rosen Dobrev

HEADQUARTERS
- Address: 75 V. Levski Blvd., 1040 Sofia
- Country: Bulgaria
- Secretary General: Teodor Iliev

The Bulgarian Handball Federation (Bulgarian: Българска федерация по хандбал; BHF) is the administrative and controlling body for handball and beach handball in Republic of Bulgaria. Founded in 1958, BHF is a member of European Handball Federation (EHF) and the International Handball Federation (IHF).

== National teams ==
- Bulgaria men's national handball team
- Bulgaria men's national junior handball team
- Bulgaria women's national handball team

== Competitions ==
- Bulgarian GHR A
