= IUVENTA Michalovce =

Slovak handball club

- Full name: Mestský športový klub IUVENTA Michalovce
- Founded: 1976
- Arena: Chemkostav Arena, Michalovce
- Capacity: 1,800
- President: Gabriel Dorič
- Head coach: František Urban
- League: MOL Liga
- 2022–23: 2nd
- Club colours
Home	Away

Location of IUVENTA Michalovce

MŠK IUVENTA Michalovce is a Slovak handball club based in Michalovce, that plays in the MOL Liga, an international championship organized for Czech and Slovak teams.

Founded in 1976, the club played in the top division from 1993-94 to 1996-97 and again from 1998-99 to 2001-02, when the Women Handball International League was created. Since then they have won the Championship 10 times.

== Titles ==
- MOL Liga
  - Winner: (10) 2005, 2006, 2007, 2009, 2014, 2015, 2016, 2017, 2019, 2022
  - Runner-up: (4) 2005, 2009, 2010, 2023
- Slovakian Championship
  - Winner: (14) 2003, 2006, 2007, 2011, 2012, 2013, 2014, 2015, 2016, 2017, 2018, 2019, 2021, 2022
  - Runner-up: (4) 2005, 2009, 2010, 2023
- Slovak Cup
  - Winner: (13) 2003, 2008, 2011, 2013, 2014, 2015, 2016, 2017, 2018, 2019, 2020, 2022, 2023
  - Finalist: (3) 2002, 2006, 2009

== European record ==
Season	Competition	Round	Club	1st leg	2nd leg	Aggregate
2016–17	EHF Champions League	Q1	(Slovenia) Krim Ljubljana	22–28		4th place
2016–17	EHF Champions League	Q1	(Poland) Lublin	21–33		4th place
2016–17	EHF Cup	R2	(Romania) Ploiești	43–19	49–14	92–33
2016–17	EHF Cup	R3	(Hungary) Alba Fehérvár	23–28	19–27	42–55

== Team ==
=== Current squad ===
Squad for the 2025-26 season

Goalkeepers

- 17 (Slovakia) Barbora Jakubíková
- 16 (Slovakia) Irina Yablonska-Bobal
- 30 (Ukraine) Anastasiia Lazorak

Wingers
LW

- 9 (Slovakia) Martina Popovcová
- 22 (Slovakia) Emma Lukácová
- 5 (Slovakia) Timea Valiska

RW

- 7 (Brazil) Alina Isabel Bieger
- 24 (Poland) Emilia Kowalik
- 65 (Ukraine) Iryna Krasnianska

Line players

- 31 (Montenegro) Andrea Brajović
- 58 (Montenegro) Vanda Cižmariková
- 77 (Brazil) Ligia Costa Maia da Silva
- 31 (Slovakia) Tamara Geffertová

Back players
LB

- 3 (Slovakia) Alene Dvoršcáková
- 71 (Slovakia) Viktoria Rohalová
- 10 (Ukraine) Karina Soskyda
- 33 (Ukraine) Iryna Kompaniiets

CB

- 11 (Slovakia) Dorota Bacenkova
- 99 (Slovakia) Barbora Sabovová
- 73 (Brazil) Juliana Costa Pereira

RB

- 34 (Argentina) Berenice Karin Frelier
