= Malta Handball Association =

Governing body for handball in Malta

Malta Handball Association MHA
- IOC nation: Republic of Malta (MLT)
- Sport: Handball
- Other sports: Beach Handball; Wheelchair Handball
- Official website: www.maltahandball.com

HISTORY
- Year of formation: 1995; 31 years ago

DEMOGRAPHICS
- Number of Handball clubs: 6
- Number of affiliated Handball clubs: 6

AFFILIATIONS
- International federation: International Handball Federation (IHF)
- IHF member since: 1996; 30 years ago
- Continental association: European Handball Federation
- National Olympic Committee: Malta Olympic Committee
- Other affiliation(s): Mediterranean Handball Confederation; Malta Sports Council

GOVERNING BODY
- President: Mr. Daniel Tabone (Malta)

HEADQUARTERS
- Address: National Swimming Pool Complex, Maria Teresa Spinelli Street, Gżira
- Country: Malta
- Chief Executive: Mr. Alan Grima (Malta)
- Secretary General: Mr. Clyde Borg Conti (Malta)

FINANCE
- Company status: Sports Federation
- Sponsors: Joma

The Malta Handball Association is the governing body of handball in Malta. It is affiliated to the International Handball Federation (IHF), the European Handball Federation and the Malta Olympic Committee (MOC). It is also registered with the Malta Sports Council (MSC).

The MHA promotes handball and beach handball on the islands and administers the competitions. Six clubs are currently registered, being Aloysians HC, Kavallieri HC, La Salle HC, Luxol HC, Phoenix HC and HMS HC.

== History ==
The Malta Handball Association was founded in 1995, and in 1999, the men's national team made its international debut in Cyprus during the first edition on the European Handball Federation Challenge Trophy. The Association went on to organize the tournament in the years 2003, 2009, and 2011.

In the season (2012/13), the association had a record of 39 registered teams and over 400 registered players taking part in the season's competitions.
