= Czech Women's Handball First Division =

Sports league

- Founded: 1993
- No. of teams: 9, competing in the WHIL
- Country: Czech Republic
- Confederation: EHF
- Most recent champions: Slavia Prague (9th title) (2025–26)
- Most titles: Baník Most (11 titles)
- International cups: EHF Champions League; EHF European League; EHF European Cup
- Website: handball.cz

The Czech Women's Handball First Division is the premier category of the Czech Republic's women's handball national league. It was established in 1993 following the dissolution of Czechoslovakia. Slavia Prague is the most recent winner as of 2026.

== List of champions ==
- 1994 Slavia Prague
- 1995 Zlín
- 1996 Zlín (2)
- 1997 Ostrava
- 1998 Ostrava (2)
- 1999 Slavia Prague (2)
- 2000 Slavia Prague (3)
- 2001 Slavia Prague (4)
- 2002 Slavia Prague (5)
- 2003 Olomouc
- 2004 Olomouc (2)
- 2005 Zlín (3)
- 2006 Veselí nad Moravou
- 2007 Slavia Prague (6)
- 2008 Olomouc (3)
- 2009 Veselí nad Moravou (2)
- 2010 Slavia Prague (7)
- 2011 Veselí nad Moravou (3)
- 2012 Sokol Poruba (3)
- 2013 Baník Most
- 2014 Baník Most (2)
- 2015 Baník Most (3)
- 2016 Baník Most (4)
- 2017 Baník Most (5)
- 2018 Baník Most (6)
- 2019 Baník Most (7)
- 2020 Not awarded
- 2021 Baník Most (8)
- 2022 Baník Most (9)
- 2023 Slavia Prague (8)
- 2024 Baník Most (10)
- 2025 Baník Most (11)
- 2026 Slavia Prague (9)
