= Handball Käerjeng =

Handball club in Luxembourg

- Full name: Handball Käerjeng
- Founded: 1974
- Arena: Kaerjenger dribbel
- President: Marc Sales
- Head coach: Riccardo Trillini
- League: Sales Lentz League
- 2015-2016: 3rd

Handball Käerjeng, formerly known as HBC Bascharage is a handball club from Bascharage, Luxembourg, that plays in the Luxembourgish Handball League.

== Titles ==
- Sales Lentz League :
  - Winners (2) : 2014; 2018
  - Runner-Up (5) : 2004, 2008, 2013, 2015, 2016
- Luxembourg Handball Cup :
  - Winners (1) : 2004, 2008, 2015, 2016
  - Runner-Up (6) : 1998, 2002, 2003, 2011, 2012, 2014

== European record ==
Season	Competition	Round	Club	1st leg	2nd leg	Aggregate
2016–17	EHF Cup	R1	(Serbia) RK Vojvodina	30–31	28–25	58–56
2016–17	EHF Cup	R2	(Portugal) S.L. Benfica	26–31	30–33	56–64

== Team ==
=== Current squad ===
Squad for the 2016–17 season

Goalkeepers

- (Luxembourg) Chris Auger
- (Romania) Razvan Constantin Cenusa
- (Luxembourg) Jerome Michels

Wingers
RW & LW

- (Luxembourg) Jeff Brix
- (Luxembourg) Tommaso Cosanti
- (Luxembourg) Mikel Molitor
- (Luxembourg) Duc Vinh Nguyen
- (Luxembourg) Loris Nicoletti
- (Italy) Carlo Sperti
- (Luxembourg) Jacques Tironzelli

Line players

- (Luxembourg) Eric Schroeder
- (Serbia) Milašin Trivić
- (France) Alex Wasmes

Back players
LB & RB

- (Moldova) Alexandru Cioban
- (Luxembourg) Pol Freres
- (Luxembourg) Bob Jacoby
- (Italy) Ivano Bianchini
- (North Macedonia) Vladimir Temelkov
- (Italy) Francesco Volpi

CB

- (Slovakia) Marek Hummel
- (Luxembourg) Tom Meis
