= HC SM Garliava =

Lithuanian handball club

- Full name: CASCADA - HC Garliava SM
- Short name: HC Garliava
- Arena: Garliavos sporto centras
- Capacity: 1,300
- President: Vilius Rašimas
- Head coach: Josip Stokic
- League: Women's Baltic Sea Handball League
- 2023/24: 3rd
- Club colours
| Home | Away |

CASCADA - HC Garliava SM is a Lithuanian women's handball club from Garliava.

HC Garliava joined the Lithuanian League in 2008 and have been champions four times, winning in 2011, 2017, 2019, and 2024. During the 2024 season the team won the Lithuanian Handball Federation Super Cup, defeating Kaunas Žalgiris in the final. The team was one of nine to join the Women's Baltic Sea Handball League for its inaugural 2023/24 season, placing third after winning six out of eight games played.

== Titles ==
- Lithuanian League
  - 2011, 2017, 2019, 2024
- Super Cup
  - 2024
