= 2026–27 EHF European Cup =

Handball tournament in Europe

EHF European Cup
- 2026–27

Tournament information
- Sport: Handball
- Dates: 12 September 2026–30 May 2027
- Teams: 83
- Website: ehfec.com

The 2026–27 EHF European Cup is the 30th season of Europe's tertiary club handball tournament organised by the European Handball Federation (EHF), and the 7th season since it was renamed from the Challenge Cup to the EHF European Cup.

The defending champions are GRK Ohrid, who won their first title in the previous season.

== Format ==
The tournament is played in a home-and-away knockout format. Finalists play a total of seven rounds (Round 1, Round 2, Round 3, last 16, quarterfinals, semifinals and the Final).

== Rankings ==
Rankings for the following federations were based on performances of clubs from each respective country during the most recent three-year period.

Rank	Association	Average points	Teams
1	Greece	44.67	5
2	Bosnia and Herzegovina	23.67	4
3	Czech Republic	21.00	3
4	Italy	20.00	4
5	Austria	19.33	5
6	Finland	17.67	2
7	Turkey	17.33	5
8	Cyprus	15.67	3
9	Belgium	12.33	1
10	Estonia	12.00	2
11	Israel	10.67	4
12	Kosovo	10.33	3
13	Netherlands	9.67	1
14	Faroe Islands	9.00	3
15	Luxembourg	9.00	4
16	Azerbaijan	8.33	1
17	Lithuania	7.33	3
18	Latvia	7.00	1
19	(United Kingdom) Great Britain	2.00	1
20	Bulgaria	2.00	0

For the following federations the number of spots in the EHF European Cup depended on the number spots in the other two European competitions.

	Association	Average points	Teams
21	Iceland	42.00	1
22	Serbia	42.00	3
23	North Macedonia	41.50	4
24	Norway	38.00	2
25	Romania	36.00	2
26	Slovenia	28.33	3
27	Hungary	22.50	1
28	Croatia	21.00	2
29	Slovakia	20.67	2
30	Switzerland	16.00	2
31	Sweden	15.33	0
32	Ukraine	11.33	1
33	Montenegro	8.67	3
34	Poland	0.00	2

== Qualified teams ==
The full list of teams qualified for each stage of the 2026–27 EHF European Cup was announced on 7 July 2026.

Notes in the parentheses show how each team qualified for the place of its starting round:

- EC: European Cup title holders
- CW: Cup winners
- CR: Cup runners-up
- 2nd, 3rd, etc.: League position of the previous season

Round 2
(Austria) roomz JAGS Vöslau (1st)	(Austria) Förthof UHK Krems (5th, CW)	(Azerbaijan) Kur	(Belgium) Derdaele Sporting Pelt (1st)
(Bosnia and Herzegovina) RK Borac m:tel (2nd)	(Bosnia and Herzegovina) RK Sloga Doboj (3rd)	(Croatia) HRK Gorica (4th)	(Cyprus) Sabbianco Anorthosis Famagusta (1st)
(Czech Republic) HC Dukla Prague (3rd)	(Czech Republic) HC ROBE Zubří (4th)	(Estonia) Põlva Serviti (1st)	(Faroe Islands) H71 (1st)
(Finland) BK-46 (1st, CW)	(Finland) HIFK (2nd)	(Greece) Olympiacos SFP (1st, CW)	(Greece) AEK (2nd, CR)
(United Kingdom) Islington HC (2nd)	(Hungary) PLER-Budapest (7th)	(Iceland) Haukar (3rd)	(Israel) AS SGS Rahat Hashron (1st)
(Italy) Cassano Magnago SSD ARL (1st)	(Italy) Raimond Sassari (2nd)	(Kosovo) KH Kastrioti (1st, CW)	(Latvia) ZRHK Tenax Dobele (1st)
(Lithuania) Dragūnas Klaipėda (1st)	(Luxembourg) Red Boys Differdange (1st)	(Montenegro) RK Lovćen (1st)	(Netherlands) HV KRAS/Volendam
(North Macedonia) GRK Ohrid (3rd)^{EC}	(North Macedonia) RK Alkaloid (4th)	(North Macedonia) HC Butel Skopje (5th)	(Norway) Runar Sandefjord (5th, CW)
(Norway) Nærbø IL (7th)	(Poland) Rebud KPR Ostrovia Ostrów Wielkopolski (4th)	(Romania) SCM Politehnica Timișoara (4th, CR)	(Serbia) RK Vojvodina (2nd)
(Serbia) RK Dinamo Pančevo (3rd)	(Slovakia) MŠK Považská Bystrica (3rd, CR)	(Slovakia) HK Kúpele Bojnice (2nd)	(Slovenia) RK Trimo Trebnje (3rd, CR)
(Slovenia) RK Slovenj Gradec (4th)	(Switzerland) Pfadi Winterthur (3rd, CW)	(Turkey) Beşiktaş JK (1st, CW)	(Turkey) Nilüfer BSK (2nd, CR)
(Ukraine) HC Motor (1st)			

Round 1
(Austria) HC Fivers WAT Margareten (7th)	(Austria) SC Kelag Ferlach (4th)	(Austria) Alpla HC Hard (2nd, CR)	(Bosnia and Herzegovina) RK Konjuh Živinice (4th, CW)
(Bosnia and Herzegovina) RK Vogošća (5th)	(Croatia) MRK Trogir (5th)	(Cyprus) Parnassos Strovolou (2nd)	(Cyprus) PAC Omonia 29M (4th)
(Czech Republic) SKKP Handball Brno (6th)	(Estonia) Tallinna Mistra (2nd)	(Faroe Islands) Kyndil (2nd)	(Faroe Islands) VÍF (4th)
(Greece) AC PAOK (3rd)	(Greece) Ionikos AC NF (4th)	(Greece) GS Drama 1986 (5th)	(Israel) Maccabi Rishon LeZion (4th)
(Israel) Maccabi Tel Aviv (6th)	(Israel) Holon Yuvalim HC (7th)	(Italy) Teamnetwork Albatro Siracusa (6th, CW)	(Italy) Pallamano Conversano (5th)
(Kosovo) KH Besa Famgas (3rd, CR)	(Kosovo) KH Vëllaznimi (4th)	(Lithuania) VHC Šviesa (2nd)	(Lithuania) Granitas-Karys (4th)
(Luxembourg) Handball Esch (4th)	(Luxembourg) HB Dudelange (2nd)	(Luxembourg) HC Berchem (3rd)	(Montenegro) RK Budvanska rivijera (2nd)
(Montenegro) RK Sutjeska Nikšić (3rd)	(North Macedonia) GRK Tikveš (6th)	(Poland) Netland MKS Kalisz (5th)	(Romania) AHC Potaissa Turda (5th)
(Serbia) RK Dubočica 54 (4th)	(Slovenia) RK Gorenje Velenje (5th)	(Switzerland) BSV Bern (4th)	(Turkey) Spor Toto SK (3rd)
(Turkey) İstanbul GSK (4th)	(Turkey) Giresunspor (5th)		

== Qualifying rounds ==
=== Round 1 ===
A total of 38 teams played in the first round. First leg matches were on 12 and 13 September 2026, while second leg matches took place on 19 and 20 September 2026. The draw was on 14 July 2026.

Team 1	Agg.	Team 2	1st leg	2nd leg
MRK Trogir (Croatia)	59–50	(Faroe Islands) VÍF	25–21	34–30
İstanbul GSK (Turkey)	75–71	(Lithuania) VHC Šviesa	44–37	31–34
Tallinna Mistra (Estonia)	76–45	(Kosovo) KH Vëllaznimi	39–18	37–27
BSV Bern (Switzerland)	79–50	(Israel) Maccabi Tel Aviv	39–25	40–25
GS Drama 1986 (Greece)	48–45	(Montenegro) RK Budvanska rivijera	32–24	16–21
PAC Omonia 29M (Cyprus)	44–52	(Lithuania) Granitas-Karys	25–21	19–31
Netland MKS Kalisz (Poland)	53–46	(Czech Republic) SKKP Handball Brno	28–23	25–23
KH Besa Famgas (Kosovo)	47–61	(Greece) Ionikos AC NF	22–29	25–32
Holon Yuvalim HC (Israel)	65–55	(Italy) Teamnetwork Albatro Siracusa	36–32	29–23
Kyndil (Faroe Islands)	45–56	(Austria) SC Kelag Ferlach	23–27	22–29
RK Dubočica 54 (Serbia)	67–65	(Austria) Alpla HC Hard	34–33	33–32
RK Gorenje Velenje (Slovenia)	71–42	(Cyprus) Parnassos Strovolou	38–18	33–24
HB Dudelange (Luxembourg)	49–62	(Greece) AC PAOK	28–33	21–29
Giresunspor (Turkey)	46–77	(Austria) HC Fivers WAT Margareten	28–40	18–37
RK Sutjeska Nikšić (Montenegro)	61–65	(Luxembourg) HC Berchem	30–31	31–34
RK Vogošća (Bosnia and Herzegovina)	43–77	(Turkey) Spor Toto SK	22–40	21–37
Pallamano Conversano (Italy)	59–66	(Israel) Maccabi Rishon LeZion	34–34	25–32
AHC Potaissa Turda (Romania)	50–44	(Bosnia and Herzegovina) RK Konjuh Živinice	24–20	26–24
GRK Tikveš (North Macedonia)	60–62	(Luxembourg) Handball Esch	27–30	33–32

=== Round 2 ===
A total of 64 teams will play in the second round. First leg matches were held on 17 and 18 October 2026, while second leg matches took place on 24 and 25 October 2026. The draw was held on 22 September 2026.

Team 1	Agg.	Team 2	1st leg	2nd leg
BSV Bern (Switzerland)	61–45	(Italy) Cassano Magnago SSD ARL	31–20	30–25
GRK Ohrid (North Macedonia)	74–46	(Turkey) Spor Toto SK	36–24	38–22
Derdaele Sporting Pelt (Belgium)	54–62	(Romania) AHC Potaissa Turda	27–29	27–33
H71 (Faroe Islands)	64–57	(Croatia) MRK Trogir	34–27	30–30
GS Drama 1986 (Greece)	58–64	(Slovakia) MŠK Považská Bystrica	31–30	27–34
RK Trimo Trebnje (Slovenia)	62–61	(Serbia) RK Dinamo Pančevo	39–27	23–34
PLER-Budapest (Hungary)	88–35	(United Kingdom) Islington HC	49–20	39–15
HV KRAS/Volendam (Netherlands)	53–52	(Austria) Förthof UHK Krems	26–28	27–24
HC Berchem (Luxembourg)	64–74	(Montenegro) RK Lovćen	30–40	34–34
BK-46 (Finland)	57–46	(Estonia) Tallinna Mistra	28–22	29–24
Rebud KPR Ostrovia Ostrów Wielkopolski (Poland)	84–57	(Turkey) İstanbul GSK	43–27	41–30
Nilüfer BSK (Turkey)	57–73	(Norway) Runar Sandefjord	28–37	29–36
HRK Gorica (Croatia)	51–49	(North Macedonia) HC Butel Skopje	27–24	24–25
AC PAOK (Greece)	57–45	(Bosnia and Herzegovina) RK Borac m:tel	38–19	19–26
Dragūnas Klaipėda (Lithuania)	62–50	(Czech Republic) HC ROBE Zubří	28–22	34–28
ZRHK Tenax Dobele (Latvia)	61–73	(Serbia) RK Dubočica 54	32–41	29–32
HC Dukla Prague (Czech Republic)	62–55	(Norway) Nærbø IL	33–28	29–27
Granitas-Karys (Lithuania)	47–77	(Romania) SCM Politehnica Timișoara	22–39	25–38
AEK (Greece)	65–44	(Cyprus) Sabbianco Anorthosis Famagusta	37–21	28–23
RK Alkaloid (North Macedonia)	63–40	(Austria) SC Kelag Ferlach	31–22	32–18
Ionikos AC NF (Greece)	51–59	(Israel) AS SGS Rahat Hashron	25–31	26–28
HIFK (Finland)	64–81	(Switzerland) Pfadi Winterthur	32–42	32–39
Beşiktaş JK (Turkey)	74–73	(Austria) HC Fivers WAT Margareten	38–31	36–42
RK Gorenje Velenje (Slovenia)	61–52	(Luxembourg) Red Boys Differdange	29–31	32–21
Kur (Azerbaijan)	56–70	(Bosnia and Herzegovina) RK Sloga Doboj	26–38	30–32
Põlva Serviti (Estonia)	58–54	(Israel) Holon Yuvalim HC	26–30	32–24
Handball Esch (Luxembourg)	45–72	(Iceland) Haukar	21–41	24–31
RK Vojvodina (Serbia)	67–64	(Israel) Maccabi Rishon LeZion	31–32	36–32
HC Motor (Ukraine)	71–80	(Slovenia) RK Slovenj Gradec	41–41	30–39
KH Kastrioti (Kosovo)	55–77	(Italy) Raimond Sassari	28–37	27–40
Olympiacos SFP (Greece)	55–45	(Poland) Netland MKS Kalisz	30–24	25–21
HK Kúpele Bojnice (Slovakia)	49–58	(Austria) roomz JAGS Vöslau	27–31	22–27

=== Round 3 ===
A total of 32 teams play in the third round. First leg matches will be held on 21 and 22 November 2026, while second leg matches will take place on 28 and 29 November 2026. The draw was held on 27 October 2026.

Team 1	Agg.	Team 2	1st leg	2nd leg
roomz JAGS Vöslau (Austria)	–	(Croatia) HRK Gorica	26–27	–
Haukar (Iceland)	–	(Slovenia) RK Slovenj Gradec	28–27	–
RK Dubočica 54 (Serbia)	–	(Finland) BK-46	–	–
AEK (Greece)	–	(Hungary) PLER-Budapest	30–34	–
RK Vojvodina (Serbia)	–	(Slovakia) MŠK Považská Bystrica	34–23	–
Runar Sandefjord (Norway)	–	(Romania) AHC Potaissa Turda	32–31	–
Olympiacos SFP (Greece)	–	(Bosnia and Herzegovina) RK Sloga Doboj	–	–
Dragūnas Klaipėda (Lithuania)	44–62	(North Macedonia) GRK Ohrid	19–30	25–32
RK Lovćen (Montenegro)	–	(Romania) SCM Politehnica Timișoara	30–36	–
RK Alkaloid (North Macedonia)	–	(Slovenia) RK Gorenje Velenje	32–23	–
AS SGS Rahat Hashron (Israel)	–	(Greece) AC PAOK	–	–
Põlva Serviti (Estonia)	–	(Czech Republic) HC Dukla Prague	36–32	–
H71 (Faroe Islands)	62–61	(Poland) Rebud KPR Ostrovia Ostrów Wielkopolski	33–31	29–30
RK Trimo Trebnje (Slovenia)	–	(Switzerland) Pfadi Winterthur	31–29	–
Beşiktaş JK (Turkey)	–	(Italy) Raimond Sassari	–	–
BSV Bern (Switzerland)	–	(Netherlands) HV KRAS/Volendam	36–31	–

== Last 16 ==
First leg matches will be held on 13 and 14 February 2027, while second leg matches will take place on 20 and 21 February 2027.

== Quarter-finals ==
First leg matches will be held on 20 and 21 March 2027, while second leg matches will take place on 27 and 28 March 2027.

== See also ==
- 2026–27 EHF Champions League
- 2026–27 EHF European League
- 2026–27 Women's EHF Champions League
- 2026–27 Women's EHF European League
- 2026–27 Women's EHF European Cup
