= 2026–27 Turkish Men's Handball Super League =

- League: Turkish Men's Handball Super League
- Sport: Handball
- Duration: 29 August 2026 – May 2027
- Teams: 10

Turkish Men's Handball Super League seasons
- ← 2025–26 2027–28 →

The 2026–27 Turkish Men's Handball Super League, was the 49th edition of the top-level Men's Handball league in Turkey. The competition was organised by the Turkish Handball Federation

General guidelines regarding participation in the leagues were published on June 1st.

A total of ten teams contest this season's league, which began on 29 August 2026 and is scheduled to conclude in May 2027.

It will be played according to the double round-robin league system. The fixtures were released on 11 August 2026.

== Regular season ==
The regular season will play by 10 teams over 18 matches.

Pos	Team	Pld	W	D	L	GF	GA	GD	Pts	Qualification or relegation
1	Beşiktaş JK	10	9	1	0	431	297	+134	19	Championship stage
2	İstanbul GSK	10	8	1	1	346	327	+19	17	Championship stage
3	Spor Toto	10	7	1	2	343	310	+33	15	Championship stage
4	Nilüfer Belediyespor	10	6	1	3	339	299	+40	13	Championship stage
5	Trabzon Büyükşehir Belediyespor	10	5	1	4	321	315	+6	11	Championship stage
6	Beykoz Belediyespor	10	4	0	6	339	362	−23	8	Championship stage
7	Mihalıççık Belediyespor	10	3	0	7	272	305	−33	6	Classification stage
8	Giresunspor	10	2	1	7	300	375	−75	5	Classification stage
9	Göztepe	10	1	1	8	290	335	−45	3	Classification stage
10	Güneysuspor	10	0	3	7	287	343	−56	3	Classification stage

Updated to match(es) played on 19 November 2026. Source: THF

=== Fixture and Results ===
==== First Half (Weeks 1-9) ====
Week 1

29 August 2026	Nilüfer Bel.	39 – 26	Güneysuspor	(report)

29 August 2026	Trabzon BB	34 – 38	Spor Toto	(report)

29 August 2026	Beşiktaş JK	43 – 22	Giresunspor	(report)

29 August 2026	İstanbul GSK	32 – 28	Mihalıççık Bel.	(report)

30 August 2026	Beykoz Bel.	33 – 30	Göztepe	(report)

Week 2

5 September 2026	Spor Toto	27 – 36	Beşiktaş JK	(report)

5 September 2026	Güneysuspor	25 – 25	Trabzon BB	(report)

5 September 2026	Göztepe	29 – 32	İstanbul GSK	(report)

5 September 2026	Giresunspor	43 – 40	Beykoz Bel.	(report)

5 September 2026	Mihalıççık Bel.	29 – 27	Nilüfer Bel.	(report)

Week 3

12 September 2026	Trabzon BB	33 – 34	Nilüfer Bel.	(report)

12 September 2026	Beşiktaş JK	45 – 31	Güneysuspor	(report)

12 September 2026	Göztepe	30 – 39	Mihalıççık Bel.	(report)

23 September 2026	Beykoz Bel.	30 – 32	Spor Toto	(report)

23 September 2026	İstanbul GSK	38 – 33	Giresunspor	(report)

Week 4

20 September 2026	Güneysuspor	29 – 30	Beykoz Bel.	(report)

20 September 2026	Nilüfer Bel.	36 – 36	Beşiktaş JK	(report)

20 September 2026	Mihalıççık Bel.	0 – 10	Trabzon BB	(report)

30 September 2026	Spor Toto	32 – 32	İstanbul GSK	(report)

30 September 2026	Giresunspor	30 – 34	Göztepe	(report)

Week 5

26 September 2026	Beşiktaş JK	48 – 36	Trabzon BB	(report)

26 September 2026	İstanbul GSK	36 – 30	Güneysuspor	(report)

26 September 2026	Göztepe	34 – 42	Spor Toto	(report)

26 September 2026	Giresunspor	31 – 29	Mihalıççık Bel.	(report)

27 September 2026	Beykoz Bel.	36 – 42	Nilüfer Bel.	(report)

Week 6

3 October 2026	Spor Toto	39 – 23	Giresunspor	(report)

3 October 2026	Güneysuspor	26 – 26	Göztepe	(report)

3 October 2026	Trabzon BB	39 – 37	Beykoz Bel.	(report)

3 October 2026	Mihalıççık Bel.	28 – 51	Beşiktaş JK	(report)

5 October 2026	Nilüfer Bel.	29 – 31	İstanbul GSK	(report)

Week 7

10 October 2026	Beykoz Bel.	28 – 45	Beşiktaş JK	(report)

10 October 2026	Göztepe	20 – 29	Nilüfer Bel.	(report)

10 October 2026	Giresunspor	32 – 32	Güneysuspor	(report)

10 October 2026	Mihalıççık Bel.	27 – 33	Spor Toto	(report)

11 October 2026	İstanbul GSK	35 – 31	Trabzon BB	(report)

Week 8

14 October 2026	Nilüfer Bel.	39 – 33	Giresunspor	(report)

14 October 2026	Beşiktaş JK	47 – 39	İstanbul GSK	(report)

17 October 2026	Trabzon BB	37 – 33	Göztepe	(report)

18 October 2026	Güneysuspor	33 – 37	Spor Toto	(report)

18 October 2026	Beykoz Bel.	35 – 32	Mihalıççık Bel.	(report)

Week 9

24 October 2026	Giresunspor	30 – 40	Trabzon BB	(report)

24 October 2026	Mihalıççık Bel.	34 – 28	Güneysuspor	(report)

18 November 2026	İstanbul GSK	43 – 42	Beykoz Bel.	(report)

18 November 2026	Göztepe	27 – 39	Beşiktaş JK	(report)

19 November 2026	Spor Toto	28 – 25	Nilüfer Bel.	(report)

==== Second Half (Weeks 10-18) ====
Week 10

14 November 2026	Mihalıççık Bel.	26 – 28	İstanbul GSK	(report)

15 November 2026	Güneysuspor	27 – 39	Nilüfer Bel.	(report)

15 November 2026	Spor Toto	35 – 36	Trabzon BB	(report)

15 November 2026	Giresunspor	23 – 41	Beşiktaş JK	(report)

15 November 2026	Göztepe	27 – 28	Beykoz Bel.	(report)

Week 11

21 November 2026	Beşiktaş JK	–	Spor Toto	(report)

22 November 2026	Trabzon BB	–	Güneysuspor	(report)

22 November 2026	İstanbul GSK	–	Göztepe	(report)

22 November 2026	Beykoz Bel.	–	Giresunspor	(report)

22 November 2026	Nilüfer Bel.	–	Mihalıççık Bel.	(report)

Week 12

28 November 2026	Nilüfer Bel.	–	Trabzon BB	(report)

28 November 2026	Güneysuspor	–	Beşiktaş JK	(report)

28 November 2026	Spor Toto	–	Beykoz Bel.	(report)

28 November 2026	Giresunspor	–	İstanbul GSK	(report)

28 November 2026	Mihalıççık Bel.	–	Göztepe	(report)

Week 13

5 December 2026	Beykoz Bel.	–	Güneysuspor	(report)

6 December 2026	İstanbul GSK	–	Spor Toto	(report)

6 December 2026	Beşiktaş JK	–	Nilüfer Bel.	(report)

6 December 2026	Göztepe	–	Giresunspor	(report)

6 December 2026	Trabzon BB	–	Mihalıççık Bel.	(report)

Week 14

12 December 2026	Güneysuspor	–	İstanbul GSK	(report)

13 December 2026	Trabzon BB	–	Beşiktaş JK	(report)

13 December 2026	Nilüfer Bel.	–	Beykoz Bel.	(report)

13 December 2026	Spor Toto	–	Göztepe	(report)

13 December 2026	Mihalıççık Bel.	–	Giresunspor	(report)

Week 15

19 December 2026	İstanbul GSK	–	Nilüfer Bel.	(report)

20 December 2026	Giresunspor	–	Spor Toto	(report)

20 December 2026	Göztepe	–	Güneysuspor	(report)

20 December 2026	Beykoz Bel.	–	Trabzon BB	(report)

20 December 2026	Beşiktaş JK	–	Mihalıççık Bel.	(report)

Week 16

3 February 2027	Beşiktaş JK	–	Beykoz Bel.	(report)

3 February 2027	Trabzon BB	–	İstanbul GSK	(report)

3 February 2027	Nilüfer Bel.	–	Göztepe	(report)

3 February 2027	Güneysuspor	–	Giresunspor	(report)

3 February 2027	Spor Toto	–	Mihalıççık Bel.	(report)

Week 17

7 February 2027	Spor Toto	–	Güneysuspor	(report)

7 February 2027	Giresunspor	–	Nilüfer Bel.	(report)

7 February 2027	Göztepe	–	Trabzon BB	(report)

7 February 2027	İstanbul GSK	–	Beşiktaş JK	(report)

7 February 2027	Mihalıççık Bel.	–	Beykoz Bel.	(report)

Week 18

14 February 2027	Nilüfer Bel.	–	Spor Toto	(report)

14 February 2027	Beykoz Bel.	–	İstanbul GSK	(report)

14 February 2027	Beşiktaş JK	–	Göztepe	(report)

14 February 2027	Trabzon BB	–	Giresunspor	(report)

14 February 2027	Güneysuspor	–	Mihalıççık Bel.	(report)

== Turkish clubs in European competitions ==
Türkiye will be represented by 5 teams in European cups.

Team	Competition	Progress
Beşiktaş JK	EHF European Cup	Round 2
Nilüfer Bel.	EHF European Cup	Round 2
Spor Toto	EHF European Cup	Round 2
İstanbul GSK	EHF European Cup	Round 2
Giresunspor	EHF European Cup	Round 1
