= 2025–26 EHF European Cup =

Handball tournament in Europe

EHF European Cup
- 2025–26
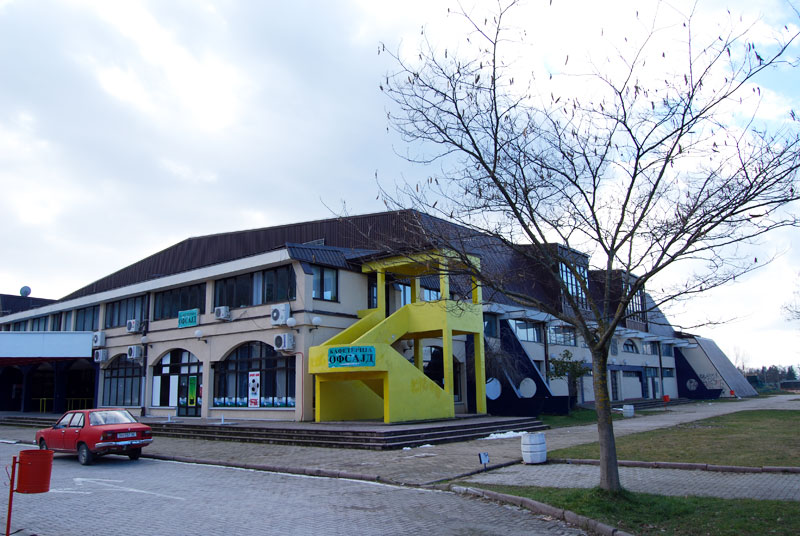
- Biljanini Izvori Sports Hall in Ohrid hosted the second leg of the final.

Tournament information
- Sport: Handball
- Dates: 6 September 2025–31 May 2026
- Teams: 73
- Website: ehfec.com

Final positions
- Champions: (North Macedonia) GRK Ohrid (1st title)
- Runner-up: (Hungary) MOL Tatabánya

The 2025–26 EHF European Cup was the 29th season of Europe's tertiary club handball tournament organised by the European Handball Federation (EHF), and the 6th season since it was renamed from the Challenge Cup to the EHF European Cup.

The defending champions are GRK Ohrid, who won their first title in the previous season.

== Format ==
The tournament is played in a knockout format. Ties were played in a home-and-away format. Finalists played a total of seven rounds (Round 1, Round 2, Round 3, Last 16, Quarterfinals, Semifinals and the Final).

== Rankings ==
Rankings for the following federations were based on performances of clubs from each respective country during the most recent three-year period.

Rank	Association	Average points	Teams
1	Norway	47.67	2
2	Serbia	36.00	3
3	Greece	33.67	5
4	Czech Republic	28.00	2
5	Belarus	28.00	0
6	Italy	17.67	4
7	Austria	17.00	4
8	Turkey	16.00	5
9	Luxembourg	14.00	4
10	Bosnia and Herzegovina	13.67	5
11	Israel	12.67	2
12	Cyprus	12.33	3
13	Estonia	11.00	3
14	Kosovo	10.33	3
15	Netherlands	10.00	1
16	Belgium	9.67	1
17	Faroe Islands	8.33	2
18	Latvia	8.33	1
19	Lithuania	7.33	3
20	Montenegro	4.33	2
21	Azerbaijan	4.00	2
N/A	(United Kingdom) Great Britain	0.00	1

For the following federations the number of spots in the EHF European Cup depended on the number spots in the other two European competitions.

	Association	Average points	Teams
23	Romania	48.50	2
24	Hungary	45.00	2
25	Iceland	35.33	1
26	Russia	31.00	0
27	Sweden	30.00	0
28	Slovenia	25.33	2
29	Croatia	25.00	0
30	Switzerland	22.00	1
31	Slovakia	20.67	1
32	Finland	11.67	1
33	Ukraine	8.33	1
34	North Macedonia	8.00	3

== Qualified teams ==
The full list of teams qualified for each stage of the 2025–26 EHF European Cup was announced on 8 July 2025.

Notes in the parentheses show how each team qualified for the place of its starting round:

- EC: European Cup title holders
- CW: Cup winners
- CR: Cup runners-up
- 2nd, 3rd, etc.: League position of the previous season

Round 2
(Austria) Förthof UHK Krems (2nd)	(Austria) Handball Tirol (5th, CW)	(Austria) HC Fivers WAT Margareten (4th)	(Azerbaijan) Kur
(Azerbaijan) HC Baki	(Belgium) Sezoens Achilles Bocholt (2nd)	(Bosnia and Herzegovina) RK Izviđač (1st)	(Bosnia and Herzegovina) RK Konjuh Živinice (2nd)
(Bosnia and Herzegovina) RK Leotar (3rd)	(Cyprus) Sabbianco Anorthosis Famagusta	A.C. European University Cyprus	(Czech Republic) HCB Karviná (1st) (Note: As the losing team of the special European League play-off, HCB Karviná dropped down to the European Cup.)
(Czech Republic) HC Dukla Prague (3rd)	(Czech Republic) SKKP Handball Brno (4th)	(Estonia) Põlva Serviti (1st)	(Estonia) Viljandi HC (3rd)
(Faroe Islands) H71	(Faroe Islands) St.Í.F	(Finland) BK-46 (1st, CW)	(Greece) Olympiacos SFP (1st)
(Greece) Diomidis Argous (3rd)	(Greece) Bianco Monte Drama (4th)	(United Kingdom) Oxford University Handball Club	(Hungary) MOL Tatabánya KC (4th)
(Iceland) Fimleikafélag Hafnarfjarðar (6th)	(Israel) Holon Yuvalim HC	(Israel) Maccabi Tel Aviv	(Italy) Pallamano Conversano
(Italy) Cassano Magnago HC	(Italy) Teamnetwork Albatro Siracusa	(Kosovo) KH Rahoveci	(Kosovo) KH Kastrioti
(Latvia) ZRHK Tenax Dobele	(Lithuania) Dragūnas Klaipėda (1st)	(Lithuania) VHC Šviesa	(Luxembourg) Red Boys Differdange (1st)
(Luxembourg) HC Berchem (2nd)	(Montenegro) RK Lovćen (1st)	(Montenegro) RK Budvanska rivijera (7th, CW)	(Netherlands) HV KRAS/Volendam
(North Macedonia) GRK Ohrid (4th)	(North Macedonia) GRK Tikveš (5th)	(Norway) Runar Sandefjord (3rd)	(Norway) Nærbø IL (5th)
(Romania) HC Buzău (3rd)	(Serbia) RK Vojvodina (2nd)	(Serbia) HC Metaloplastika Elixir (3rd)	(Serbia) HC Dinamo Pančevo (4th)
(Slovakia) MŠK Považská Bystrica (2nd)	(Slovenia) RK Trimo Trebnje (3rd)	(Slovenia) RK Celje Pivovarna Laško (4th)	(Switzerland) HSC Suhr Aarau (5th)
(Turkey) Beşiktaş JK (1st, CW)	(Turkey) Nilüfer BSK (2nd)	(Ukraine) HC Motor (1st)	

Round 1
(Austria) roomz JAGS Vöslau (8th, CR)	(Bosnia and Herzegovina) RK Vogošća (6th)	(Bosnia and Herzegovina) RK Sloga Doboj (4th)	(Cyprus) Parnassos Strovolou
(Estonia) Mistra (2nd)	(Greece) AC PAOK (5th)	(Greece) ESN Vrilissia (8th, CR)	(Hungary) Balatonfüredi KSE (5th)
(Italy) Raimond Sassari	(Kosovo) KH Besa Famgas	(Lithuania) Granitas-Karys (2nd)	(Luxembourg) HB Dudelange (3rd)
(Luxembourg) Handball Esch (4th)	(North Macedonia) HC Butel Skopje (6th)	(Romania) CSM Constanța (5th)	(Turkey) Beykoz BLD SK (4th, CR)
(Turkey) Spor Toto SK (5th)	(Turkey) Depsaş Enerji AS SK (3rd)		

== Qualifying rounds ==
=== Round 1 ===
A total of 18 teams played in the first round. First leg matches were held on 6 and 7 September 2025, while second leg matches took place on 13 and 14 September 2025. The draw was on 15 July 2025.

Team 1	Agg.	Team 2	1st leg	2nd leg
HB Dudelange (Luxembourg)	56–55	(North Macedonia) HC Butel Skopje	27–31	29–24
roomz JAGS Vöslau (Austria)	62–46	(Estonia) Mistra	31–23	31–23
Beykoz BLD SK (Turkey)	38–85	(Hungary) Balatonfüredi KSE	18–42	20–43
RK Sloga Doboj (Bosnia and Herzegovina)	74–54	(Lithuania) Granitas-Karys	37–21	37–33
Handball Esch (Luxembourg)	73–75	(Bosnia and Herzegovina) RK Vogošća	42–31	31–44
ESN Vrilissia (Greece)	44–60	(Greece) AC PAOK	20–27	24–33
KH Besa Famgas (Kosovo)	67–64	(Turkey) Depsaş Enerji AS SK	39–34	28–30
Spor Toto SK (Turkey)	70–78	(Italy) Raimond Sassari	32–36	38–42
CSM Constanța (Romania)	73–46	(Cyprus) Parnassos Strovolou	39–22	34–24

=== Round 2 ===
A total of 64 teams played in the first round. First leg matches were held on 11 and 12 October 2025, while second leg matches took place on 18 and 19 October 2025.

Team 1	Agg.	Team 2	1st leg	2nd leg
KH Rahoveci (Kosovo)	61–86	(Luxembourg) HB Dudelange	34–41	27–45
VHC Šviesa (Lithuania)	55–51	(Ukraine) HC Motor	31–25	24–26
Pallamano Conversano (Italy)	47–56	(Czech Republic) SKKP Handball Brno	20–25	27–31
Beşiktaş JK (Turkey)	54–41	(North Macedonia) GRK Tikveš	31–20	23–21
HC Dinamo Pančevo (Serbia)	54–60	(Czech Republic) HCB Karviná	29–27	25–33
HC Baki (Azerbaijan)	32–82	(North Macedonia) GRK Ohrid	11–44	21–38
RK Lovćen (Montenegro)	55–58	(Greece) Bianco Monte Drama	32–27	23–31
RK Sloga Doboj (Bosnia and Herzegovina)	74–65	(Latvia) ZRHK Tenax Dobele	41–31	33–34
Handball Tirol (Austria)	59–56	(Lithuania) Dragūnas Klaipėda	29–27	30–29
Balatonfüredi KSE (Hungary)	81–39	(Azerbaijan) Kur	42–19	39–20
Raimond Sassari (Italy)	69–61	(Slovakia) MŠK Považská Bystrica	34–26	35–35
HC Metaloplastika Elixir (Serbia)	56–58	(Switzerland) HSC Suhr Aarau	28–30	28–28
Teamnetwork Albatro Siracusa (Italy)	53–72	(Greece) Olympiacos SFP	28–34	25–38
HV KRAS/Volendam (Netherlands)	57–58	(Italy) Cassano Magnago HC	28–29	29–29
Förthof UHK Krems (Austria)	58–59	(Austria) HC Fivers WAT Margareten	31–27	27–32
Sezoens Achilles Bocholt (Belgium)	57–75	(Slovenia) RK Celje Pivovarna Laško	27–31	30–44
Viljandi HC (Estonia)	55–89	(Norway) Runar Sandefjord	26–45	29–44
RK Izviđač (Bosnia and Herzegovina)	72–51	(Kosovo) KH Besa Famgas	40–19	32–32
A.C. European University Cyprus	44–64	(Estonia) Pölva Serviti	23–31	21–33
CSM Constanța (Romania)	58–70	(Czech Republic) HC Dukla Prague	27–37	31–33
Nærbø IL (Norway)	59–63	(Hungary) MOL Tatabánya KC	32–30	27–33
roomz JAGS Vöslau (Austria)	49–62	(Slovenia) RK Trimo Trebnje	28–32	21–30
RK Vogošća (Bosnia and Herzegovina)	62–69	(Finland) BK-46	30–40	32–29
RK Konjuh Živinice (Bosnia and Herzegovina)	56–54	(Faroe Islands) H71	36–28	20–26
St.Í.F (Faroe Islands)	48–72	(Serbia) RK Vojvodina	27–38	21–34
Diomidis Argous (Greece)	60–60 7–8 PS	(Montenegro) RK Budvanska rivijera	28–30	32–30
Red Boys Differdange (Luxembourg)	60–54	(Kosovo) KH Kastrioti	31–28	29–26
Fimleikafélag Hafnarfjarðar (Iceland)	57–60	(Turkey) Nilüfer BSK	23–31	34–29
AC PAOK (Greece)	60–56	(Israel) Holon Yuvalim HC	31–31	29–25
HC Buzău (Romania)	89–51	(Bosnia and Herzegovina) RK Leotar	46–21	43–30
HC Berchem (Luxembourg)	77–48	(United Kingdom) Oxford University HC	34–27	43–21
Maccabi Tel Aviv (Israel)	60–53	(Cyprus) Sabbianco Anorthosis Famagusta	38–28	22–25

=== Round 3 ===
A total of 32 teams played in the third round. First leg matches were held on 15 and 16 November 2025, while second leg matches took place on 22 and 23 November 2025.

Team 1	Agg.	Team 2	1st leg	2nd leg
Raimond Sassari (Italy)	56–64	(Bosnia and Herzegovina) RK Konjuh Živinice	28–36	28–28
Pölva Serviti (Estonia)	55–58	(Finland) BK-46	28–27	27–31
GRK Ohrid (North Macedonia)	79–37	(Bosnia and Herzegovina) RK Sloga Doboj	37–19	42–18
Bianco Monte Drama (Greece)	50–58	(Czech Republic) HC Dukla Prague	20–27	30–31
RK Vojvodina (Serbia)	66–69	(Slovenia) RK Celje Pivovarna Laško	34–32	32–37
Beşiktaş JK (Turkey)	55–54	(Greece) AC PAOK	30–25	25–29
MOL Tatabánya KC (Hungary)	67–58	(Switzerland) HSC Suhr Aarau	40–33	27–25
Nilüfer BSK (Turkey)	69–63	(Luxembourg) Red Boys Differdange	35–29	34–34
HC Buzău (Romania)	76–66	(Israel) Maccabi Tel Aviv	36–33	40–33
SKKP Handball Brno (Czech Republic)	54–49	(Luxembourg) HC Berchem	27–25	27–24
HCB Karviná (Czech Republic)	76–65	(Austria) Handball Tirol	43–25	33–40
HC Fivers WAT Margareten (Austria)	60–66	(Hungary) Balatonfüredi KSE	31–34	29–32
Olympiacos SFP (Greece)	54–46	(Italy) Cassano Magnago HC	25–20	29–26
RK Budvanska rivijera (Montenegro)	43–69	(Slovenia) RK Trimo Trebnje	23–33	20–36
RK Izviđač (Bosnia and Herzegovina)	61–56	(Luxembourg) HB Dudelange	29–27	32–29
Runar Sandefjord (Norway)	72–63	(Lithuania) VHC Šviesa	36–30	36–33

== Last 16 ==
First leg matches will be held on 14 and 15 February 2026, while second leg matches will take place on 21 and 22 February 2026.

Results

Team 1	Agg.	Team 2	1st leg	2nd leg
Olympiacos SFP (Greece)	70–55	(Finland) BK-46	39–30	31–25
RK Izviđač (Bosnia and Herzegovina)	65–61	(Slovenia) RK Trimo Trebnje	31–28	34–33
GRK Ohrid (North Macedonia)	60–45	(Czech Republic) HC Dukla Prague	30–21	30–24
SKKP Handball Brno (Czech Republic)	57–58	(Turkey) Nilüfer BSK	29–26	28–32
HCB Karviná (Czech Republic)	58–55	(Hungary) Balatonfüredi KSE	30–28	28–27
MOL Tatabánya KC (Hungary)	71–64	(Norway) Runar Sandefjord	35–33	36–31
RK Celje Pivovarna Laško (Slovenia)	75–68	(Turkey) Beşiktaş	39–34	36–34
RK Konjuh Živinice (Bosnia and Herzegovina)	51–63	(Romania) HC Buzău	28–26	23–37

== Quarter-finals ==
First leg matches were be held on 28 and 29 March 2026, while second leg matches took place on 4 and 5 April 2026.

Results

Team 1	Agg.	Team 2	1st leg	2nd leg
MOL Tatabánya KC (Hungary)	68–66	(Turkey) Nilüfer BSK	31–31	37–35
RK Celje Pivovarna Laško (Slovenia)	77–68	(Romania) HC Buzău	41–32	36–36
Olympiacos SFP (Greece)	50–56	(North Macedonia) GRK Ohrid	26–31	24–25
RK Izviđač (Bosnia and Herzegovina)	65–65; 7–6 (p)	(Czech Republic) HCB Karviná	36–31	29–34

=== Matches ===
28 March 2026; 18:00	MOL Tatabánya KC (Hungary)	31–31	(Turkey) Nilüfer BSK	Tatabányai Multifunkcionális Sportcsarnok, Tatabánya; Attendance: 2,216; Referees: Bosnjak, Maric (BIH)
28 March 2026; 18:00	Éles, Krakovszki 5	(12–15)	Yadegari 9	Tatabányai Multifunkcionális Sportcsarnok, Tatabánya; Attendance: 2,216; Referees: Bosnjak, Maric (BIH)
28 March 2026; 18:00	1× (yellow card) 2× (suspension)	Report	6× (suspension) 1× (red card)	Tatabányai Multifunkcionális Sportcsarnok, Tatabánya; Attendance: 2,216; Referees: Bosnjak, Maric (BIH)

4 April 2026; 17:00	Nilüfer BSK (Turkey)	35–37	(Hungary) MOL Tatabánya KC	Nilüfer Belediye Spor Tesisleri, Bursa; Attendance: 350; Referees: Sniurevicius, Grigalionis (LTU)
4 April 2026; 17:00	Djurdjević 8	(18–20)	Zhitnikov 8	Nilüfer Belediye Spor Tesisleri, Bursa; Attendance: 350; Referees: Sniurevicius, Grigalionis (LTU)
4 April 2026; 17:00	3× (suspension)	Report	6× (suspension)	Nilüfer Belediye Spor Tesisleri, Bursa; Attendance: 350; Referees: Sniurevicius, Grigalionis (LTU)

MOL Tatabánya KC won 68–66 on aggregate.

28 March 2026; 18:00	RK Celje Pivovarna Laško (Slovenia)	41–32	(Romania) HC Buzău	Zlatorog Arena, Celje; Attendance: 3,247; Referees: Charitsos, Naskos (GRE)
28 March 2026; 18:00	Marguč 8	(18–12)	Tărîță, Rata 7	Zlatorog Arena, Celje; Attendance: 3,247; Referees: Charitsos, Naskos (GRE)
28 March 2026; 18:00	2× (suspension)	Report	1× (yellow card) 1× (suspension)	Zlatorog Arena, Celje; Attendance: 3,247; Referees: Charitsos, Naskos (GRE)

4 April 2026; 17:00	HC Buzău (Romania)	36–36	(Slovenia) RK Celje Pivovarna Laško	Romeo Iamandi Sports Hall, Buzău; Attendance: 1,700; Referees: Panayides, Andreou (CYP)
4 April 2026; 17:00	Gogola, Grbović 6	(21–17)	Anžic 7	Romeo Iamandi Sports Hall, Buzău; Attendance: 1,700; Referees: Panayides, Andreou (CYP)
4 April 2026; 17:00	2× (suspension)	Report	1× (yellow card) 5× (suspension)	Romeo Iamandi Sports Hall, Buzău; Attendance: 1,700; Referees: Panayides, Andreou (CYP)

RK Celje Pivovarna Laško won 77–68 on aggregate.

29 March 2026; 16:00	Olympiacos SFP (Greece)	26–31	(North Macedonia) GRK Ohrid	A'Indoor Sports Hall of Ilioupolis, Ilioupoli; Attendance: 590; Referees: Nygaard, Primdahl (DEN)
29 March 2026; 16:00	Savvas 14	(10–15)	Ivanković, Liapis 7	A'Indoor Sports Hall of Ilioupolis, Ilioupoli; Attendance: 590; Referees: Nygaard, Primdahl (DEN)
29 March 2026; 16:00	1× (suspension)	Report	5× (suspension)	A'Indoor Sports Hall of Ilioupolis, Ilioupoli; Attendance: 590; Referees: Nygaard, Primdahl (DEN)

4 April 2026; 18:00	GRK Ohrid (North Macedonia)	25–24	(Greece) Olympiacos SFP	Biljanini Izvori Sports Hall, Ohrid; Attendance: 2,300; Referees: Mandak, Rudinsky (SVK)
4 April 2026; 18:00	Ivanković 8	(14–12)	Savvas 5	Biljanini Izvori Sports Hall, Ohrid; Attendance: 2,300; Referees: Mandak, Rudinsky (SVK)
4 April 2026; 18:00	2× (yellow card) 9× (suspension) 1× (red card)	Report	4× (suspension)	Biljanini Izvori Sports Hall, Ohrid; Attendance: 2,300; Referees: Mandak, Rudinsky (SVK)

GRK Ohrid won 56–50 on aggregate.

29 March 2026; 18:00	RK Izviđač (Bosnia and Herzegovina)	36–31	(Czech Republic) HCB Karviná	Sportska Dvorana Ljubuski, Ljubuški; Attendance: 4,000; Referees: Aghakishi, Aghakishi (AZE)
29 March 2026; 18:00	Ćeško 10	(20–12)	Blyznyuk 7	Sportska Dvorana Ljubuski, Ljubuški; Attendance: 4,000; Referees: Aghakishi, Aghakishi (AZE)
29 March 2026; 18:00	2× (yellow card) 3× (suspension)	Report	1× (yellow card) 4× (suspension)	Sportska Dvorana Ljubuski, Ljubuški; Attendance: 4,000; Referees: Aghakishi, Aghakishi (AZE)

5 April 2026
17:00
HCB Karviná (Czech Republic)
44–40
(Bosnia and Herzegovina) RK Izviđač
Sportovni hala házené STARS, Karviná
Attendance: 1,700
Referees: Klompers, Stobbe (NED)
Patzel 10
(19–14)
Ćeško 9
2× (suspension)
Report
1× (yellow card) 5× (suspension) 1× (red card)

FT: 34–29 Pen: 6–7

RK Izviđač won 72–71 on aggregate.

== Semi-finals ==
Results

Team 1	Agg.	Team 2	1st leg	2nd leg
RK Celje Pivovarna Laško (Slovenia)	54–55	(North Macedonia) GRK Ohrid	27–26	27–29
RK Izviđač (Bosnia and Herzegovina)	67–68	(Hungary) MOL Tatabánya KC	33–31	34–37

=== Matches ===
25 April 2026; 18:00	RK Celje Pivovarna Laško (Slovenia)	27–26	(North Macedonia) GRK Ohrid	Zlatorog Arena, Celje; Attendance: 4,344; Referees: Jovic, Arnautovic (BIH)
25 April 2026; 18:00	Anžic 8	(15–11)	Đukić 5	Zlatorog Arena, Celje; Attendance: 4,344; Referees: Jovic, Arnautovic (BIH)
25 April 2026; 18:00	1× (yellow card) 3× (suspension) 1× (red card)	Report	1× (yellow card) 4× (suspension)	Zlatorog Arena, Celje; Attendance: 4,344; Referees: Jovic, Arnautovic (BIH)

2 May 2026
19:00
GRK Ohrid (North Macedonia)
29-27
(Slovenia) RK Celje Pivovarna Laško
Biljanini Izvori Sports Hall, Ohrid
Attendance: 3,500
Referees: Fabryczny, Rawicki (POL)

(11-11)

Report

FT: 25–24 Pen: 4–3

GRK Ohrid won 55–54 on aggregate.

26 April 2026; 20:00	RK Izviđač (Bosnia and Herzegovina)	33–31	(Hungary) MOL Tatabánya KC	Sportska dvorana Ljubuški, Ljubuški; Attendance: 4,000; Referees: Fotakidis, Kinatzidis (GRE)
26 April 2026; 20:00	Melić 10	(17–16)	Vajda 4	Sportska dvorana Ljubuški, Ljubuški; Attendance: 4,000; Referees: Fotakidis, Kinatzidis (GRE)
26 April 2026; 20:00	2× (suspension)	Report	1× (yellow card) 1× (suspension)	Sportska dvorana Ljubuški, Ljubuški; Attendance: 4,000; Referees: Fotakidis, Kinatzidis (GRE)

1 May 2026; 17:00	MOL Tatabánya KC (Hungary)	37–34	(Bosnia and Herzegovina) RK Izviđač	Tatabányai Multifunkcionális Sportcsarnok, Tatabánya; Attendance: 3,679; Referees: Borge, Nygren (NOR)
1 May 2026; 17:00	Grigoraș 9	(20–19)	Melić 7	Tatabányai Multifunkcionális Sportcsarnok, Tatabánya; Attendance: 3,679; Referees: Borge, Nygren (NOR)
1 May 2026; 17:00	9× (suspension)	Report	7× (suspension) 1× (red card)	Tatabányai Multifunkcionális Sportcsarnok, Tatabánya; Attendance: 3,679; Referees: Borge, Nygren (NOR)

MOL Tatabánya KC won 68–67 on aggregate.

== Finals ==
Results

Team 1	Agg.	Team 2	1st leg	2nd leg
MOL Tatabánya KC (Hungary)	53–60	(North Macedonia) GRK Ohrid	28–29	25-31

=== Matches ===
24 May 2026; 17:00	MOL Tatabánya KC (Hungary)	28–29	(North Macedonia) GRK Ohrid	Tatabányai Multifunkcionális Sportcsarnok, Tatabánya; Attendance: 5,811; Referees: Sirbu, Serdiuc (MDA)
24 May 2026; 17:00	Éles 9	(8–13)	Ivanković, Đukić 7	Tatabányai Multifunkcionális Sportcsarnok, Tatabánya; Attendance: 5,811; Referees: Sirbu, Serdiuc (MDA)
24 May 2026; 17:00	6× (suspension)	Report	1× (yellow card) 10× (suspension)	Tatabányai Multifunkcionális Sportcsarnok, Tatabánya; Attendance: 5,811; Referees: Sirbu, Serdiuc (MDA)

31 May 2026; 20:00	GRK Ohrid (North Macedonia)	31:25	(Hungary) MOL Tatabánya KC	Biljanini Izvori Sports Hall, Ohrid; Referees: D. Accoto Martins, R. Accoto Martins (POR)
31 May 2026; 20:00		Report		Biljanini Izvori Sports Hall, Ohrid; Referees: D. Accoto Martins, R. Accoto Martins (POR)

GRK Ohrid won 60–53 on aggregate.

== See also ==
- 2025–26 EHF Champions League
- 2025–26 EHF European League
- 2025–26 Women's EHF Champions League
- 2025–26 Women's EHF European League
- 2025–26 Women's EHF European Cup
