= 2023–24 EHF European Cup =

European club handball tournament

EHF European Cup
- 2023–24
- Peace and Friendship Stadium in Piraeus hosted the second leg of the final.

Tournament information
- Sport: Handball
- Dates: 9 September 2023–26 May 2024
- Teams: 76
- Website: ehfec.com

Final positions
- Champions: (Iceland) Valur (1st title)
- Runner-up: (Greece) Olympiacos S.F.P.

Tournament statistics
- Matches played: 146
- Top scorer(s): (Greece) Savvas Savvas (81 goals)

The 2023–24 EHF European Cup was the 27th season of Europe's tertiary club handball tournament organised by European Handball Federation (EHF), and the 4th season since it was renamed from the Challenge Cup to the EHF European Cup. RK Vojvodina were the defending champions, but they were not defending their title because they played in this season's EHF European League group stage.

Valur became the first Icelandic team to club handball competition, beating Olympiacos S.F.P. on penalties in the final.

== Format ==
The tournament was played in a straight knockout format. The ties were held in a home and away format. Overall, there were seven rounds to navigate in order to win the trophy (Round 1, Round 2, Round 3, Last 16, Quarterfinals, Semifinals and Final).

== Rankings ==
The rankings were based on the performances of each club from a respective country from a three year period.

Rank	Association	Average points	Teams
1	Czech Republic	31.00	4
2	Iceland	19.67	4
3	Cyprus	17.00	2
4	Luxembourg	16.00	4
5	Belarus	15.33	0
6	Turkey	12.67	4
7	Estonia	12.67	4
8	Israel	12.00	3
9	Ukraine	11.00	3
10	Bosnia and Herzegovina	10.33	3
11	Latvia	10.00	1
12	Lithuania	8.67	4
13	Kosovo	8.00	2
14	Serbia	8.00	3

Rank	Association	Average points	Teams
15	Finland	7.33	3
16	Italy	6.67	4
17	Netherlands	5.00	1
18	Faroe Islands	3.00	4
19	Bulgaria	2.67	0
20	Moldova	1.00	0
21	Azerbaijan	0.33	2
21	(United Kingdom) Great Britain	0.33	0
23	Belgium	0.00	2
24	(Georgia (country)) Georgia	0.00	0
25	Malta	0.00	0
26	Montenegro	0.00	0
27	(N/A) Everyone else	0.00	0

Other countries who entered
Rank	Association	Average points	Teams
27	Greece	43.33	3
28	Romania	39.67	2
30	Norway	38.33	2
30	Slovenia	20.00	1
30	Switzerland	15.67	1
30	Austria	11.33	4
37	Croatia	0.00	2
37	Hungary	0.00	1
37	North Macedonia	0.00	1

== Qualified teams ==
The full list of teams qualified for each stage of the 2023–24 EHF European Cup was announced on 10 July 2023.

The labels in the parentheses show how each team qualified for the place of its starting round:

- EC: European Cup title holders
- CW: Cup winners
- CR: Cup runners-up
- 4th, 5th, etc.: League position of the previous season
  - SF: Semi-final league position
  - QF: Quarter-final league position

Round 2
(Austria) Förthof UHK Krems	(Austria) HC Linz AG	(Azerbaijan) Azeryol HC	(Azerbaijan) Kur
(Belgium) HC Visé BM	(Belgium) Sezoens Achilles Bocholt	(Bosnia and Herzegovina) RK Leotar	(Bosnia and Herzegovina) RK Vogošća
(Croatia) MRK Sesvete	(Croatia) MRK Trogir	(Cyprus) Sabbianco Anorthosis Famagusta	(Cyprus) Parnassos Strovolou
(Czech Republic) HCB Karviná	(Czech Republic) HK FCC Město Lovosice	(Estonia) Põlva Serviti	(Estonia) Viljandi HC
(Faroe Islands) H71	(Faroe Islands) VÍF	(Finland) BK-46	(Finland) Riihimäki Cocks
(Greece) AC PAOK	(Greece) Olympiacos S.F.P.	(Hungary) FTC-Green Collect	(Iceland) UMF Afturelding
(Iceland) ÍBV Vestmannaeyjar	(Israel) Hapoel Ashdod	(Israel) Maccabi Rishon LeZion	(Italy) Raimond Sassari
(Italy) Sidea Group Junior Fasano	(Kosovo) KH Besa Famgas	(Kosovo) KH Trepça-M	(Latvia) ZRHK Tenax Dobele
(Lithuania) HC Dragūnas Klaipėda	(Lithuania) VHC Šviesa	(Luxembourg) Handball Esch	(Luxembourg) HB Red Boys Differdange
(Montenegro) RK Budućnost Podgorica	(Netherlands) HV KRAS/Volendam	(North Macedonia) GRK Tikveš	(Norway) Runar Sandefjord
(Norway) Nærbø IL	(Romania) CSA Steaua București	(Romania) CS Minaur Baia Mare	(Serbia) HC Metaloplastika Elixir Šabac
(Serbia) HC Partizan	(Slovakia) Tatran Prešov	(Slovenia) MRK Krka	(Switzerland) BSV Bern
(Turkey) Beykoz BSK	(Turkey) Sakarya Büyüksehir BSK	(Ukraine) Motor	(Ukraine) Odesa

Round 1
(Austria) Bregenz Handball	(Austria) Fivers	(Bosnia and Herzegovina) RK Sloboda	(Czech Republic) HC ROBE Zubří
(Czech Republic) SKKP Handball Brno	(Estonia) HC Tallinn	(Estonia) Raasiku/Mistra	(Faroe Islands) Neistin
(Faroe Islands) Team Klaksvík	(Finland) IFK Handball Helsinki	(Greece) Diomidis Argous	(Iceland) FH Hafnarfjarðar
(Iceland) Valur	(Israel) Yuvalim Holon HC	(Italy) Handball Meran	(Italy) SV Brixen Handball
(Lithuania) Granitas-Karys	(Lithuania) HC Amber	(Luxembourg) HC Berchem	(Luxembourg) HB Käerjeng
(Serbia) HC Dinamo	(Turkey) Beşiktaş	(Turkey) Spor Toto SK	(Ukraine) Donbass

== Qualifying rounds ==
=== Round 1 ===
A total of 24 teams were involved in the first qualifying round. The first leg matches were held on 9–10 September 2023, while the second leg matches were held on 16–17 September 2023. The draw was on the 18 July 2023.

Results

Team 1	Agg.	Team 2	1st leg	2nd leg
Handball Meran (Italy)	58–60	(Serbia) HC Dinamo	27–30	31–30
Beşiktaş (Turkey)	84–49	(Ukraine) Donbass	41–30	43–19
Mistra (Estonia)	49–63	(Austria) Bregenz Handball	25–30	24–33
HC Tallinn (Estonia)	50–60	(Luxembourg) HB Käerjeng	26–26	24–34
SKKP Handball Brno (Czech Republic)	56–54	(Czech Republic) HC ROBE Zubří	28–22	28–32
IFK Handball Helsinki (Finland)	57–65	(Turkey) Spor Toto SK	28–29	29–36
Yuvalim Holon HC (Israel)	64–49	(Faroe Islands) Neistin	34–23	30–26
Diomidis Argous (Greece)	50–58	(Iceland) FH Hafnarfjarðar	32–32	18–26
HC Berchem (Luxembourg)	56–66	(Austria) Fivers	33–33	23–33
Team Klaksvik (Faroe Islands)	37–53	(Bosnia and Herzegovina) RK Sloboda	19–30	18–23
Valur (Iceland)	60–52	(Lithuania) Granitas-Karys	27–24	33–28
HC Amber (Lithuania)	52–62	(Italy) SV Brixen Handball	23–34	29–28

=== Round 2 ===
A total of 64 teams were involved in the second qualifying round, 12 teams advancing from the previous round and 52 teams entering this round. The first leg matches were held on 14–15 October 2023, while the second leg matches were held on 21–22 October 2023. The draw was on the 18 July 2023.

Results

Team 1	Agg.	Team 2	1st leg	2nd leg
HC Dinamo (Serbia)	71–69	(Netherlands) HV KRAS/Volendam	30–33	41–36
Sabbianco Anorthosis Famagusta (Note: Sabbianco Anorthosis Famagusta was disqualified from the competition due to fan trouble in the previous season. HC Metaloplastika Elixir Šabac advanced to the next round.) (Cyprus)	0–20	(Serbia) HC Metaloplastika Elixir Šabac	0–10	0–10
Sidea Group Junior Fasano (Italy)	49–56	(Czech Republic) SKKP Handball Brno	29–28	20–28
Viljandi HC (Estonia)	48–65	(Slovenia) MRK Krka	23–32	25–33
FH Hafnarfjarðar (Iceland)	64–57	(Serbia) HC Partizan	34–34	30–23
Maccabi Rishon LeZion (Note: The Israeli teams Maccabi Rishon LeZion, Yuvalim Holon HC and Hapoel Ashdod withdrew from the tournament due to the Gaza war. RK Sloboda, BK-46 and CSA Steaua București advanced to the next round.) (Israel)	0–20	(Bosnia and Herzegovina) RK Sloboda	0–10	0–10
Riihimäki Cocks (Finland)	51–69	(Switzerland) BSV Bern	25–29	26–40
RK Leotar (Bosnia and Herzegovina)	53–48	(Latvia) ZRHK TENAX Dobele	24–22	29–26
FTC-Green Collect (Hungary)	84–47	(Cyprus) Parnassos Strovolou	44–25	40–22
Beykoz BSK (Turkey)	58–62	(Belgium) HC Visé BM	31–29	27–33
Raimond Sassari (Italy)	53–69	(Greece) Olympiacos S.F.P.	24–31	29–38
Põlva Serviti (Estonia)	57–71	(Iceland) Valur	29–32	28–39
ÍBV Vestmannaeyjar (Iceland)	69–64	(Luxembourg) HB Red Boys Differdange	34–30	35–34
VHC Šviesa (Lithuania)	53–59	(Austria) Bregenz Handball	23–32	30–27
MRK Sesvete (Croatia)	64–39	(Azerbaijan) Kur	30–15	34–24
BK-46 (Finland)	20–0	(Israel) Yuvalim Holon HC	10–0	10–0
GRK Tikveš (North Macedonia)	58–62	(Austria) Förthof UHK Krems	33–29	25–33
Azeryol HC (Azerbaijan)	41–80	(Italy) SV Brixen Handball	22–43	19–37
Nærbø IL (Norway)	50–51	(Iceland) Afturelding	27–22	23–29
KH Besa Famgas (Kosovo)	52–83	(Turkey) Beşiktaş	24–43	28–40
Handball Esch (Luxembourg)	58–61	(Faroe Islands) VIF	30–31	28–30
Runar Sandefjord (Norway)	80–61	(Turkey) Sakarya Büyüksehir BSK	42–29	38–32
MRK Trogir (Croatia)	58–44	(Faroe Islands) H71	29–22	29–22
HB Käerjeng (Luxembourg)	57–64	(Ukraine) Motor	27–31	30–33
Sezoens Achilles Bocholt (Belgium)	58–53	(Lithuania) HC Dragūnas Klaipėda	32–27	26–26
HC Linz AG (Austria)	52–51	(Greece) AC PAOK	27–26	25–25
CSA Steaua București (Romania)	20–0	(Israel) Hapoel Ashdod	10–0	10–0
CS Minaur Baia Mare (Romania)	91–53	(Ukraine) Odesa	52–26	39–27
HCB Karviná (Czech Republic)	64–62	(Austria) Fivers	32–26	32–36
KH Trepça-M (Kosovo)	57–58	(Bosnia and Herzegovina) RK Vogošća	27–27	30–31
HK FCC Město Lovosice (Czech Republic)	54–68	(Slovakia) Tatran Prešov	28–32	26–36
Spor Toto SK (Turkey)	54–41	(Montenegro) RK Budućnost Podgorica	31–24	23–17

=== Round 3 ===
A total of 32 teams were involved in the third qualifying round. The first leg matches were held on 25–26 November 2023, while the second leg matches were held on 2–3 December 2023. The draw was held on the 24 October 2023.

Results

Team 1	Agg.	Team 2	1st leg	2nd leg
Förthof UHK Krems (Austria)	62–60	(Iceland) ÍBV Vestmannaeyjar	30–28	32–32
HC Metaloplastika Elixir Šabac (Serbia)	61–59	(Finland) BK-46	31–29	30–30
Bregenz Handball (Austria)	61–58	(Norway) Runar Sandefjord	33–29	28–29
HC Visé BM (Belgium)	58–68	(Slovenia) MRK Krka	27–31	31–37
RK Sloboda (Bosnia and Herzegovina)	61–53	(Turkey) Spor Toto SK	34–25	27–28
Afturelding (Iceland)	49–55	(Slovakia) Tatran Prešov	24–27	25–28
RK Leotar (Bosnia and Herzegovina)	48–56	(Czech Republic) HCB Karviná	27–28	21–28
SV Brixen Handball (Italy)	75–72	(Faroe Islands) VIF	37–35	38–37
CS Minaur Baia Mare (Romania)	58–52	(Serbia) HC Dinamo	33–23	25–29
Motor (Ukraine)	59–68	(Iceland) Valur	31–35	28–33
BSV Bern (Switzerland)	57–62	(Hungary) FTC-Green Collect	33–29	24–33
RK Vogošća (Bosnia and Herzegovina)	57–52	(Czech Republic) SKKP Handball Brno	30–23	27–29
CSA Steaua București (Romania)	64–53	(Austria) HC Linz AG	33–23	31–30
MRK Trogir (Croatia)	54–63	(Greece) Olympiacos S.F.P.	26–27	28–36
MRK Sesvete (Croatia)	63–65	(Turkey) Beşiktaş	34–27	29–38
FH Hafnarfjarðar (Iceland)	68–62	(Belgium) Sezoens Achilles Bocholt	35–26	33–36

== Last 16 ==
The first leg matches were held on 10–11 February 2024, while the second leg matches were held on 17–18 February 2024. The draw was on the 5 December 2023.

Results

Team 1	Agg.	Team 2	1st leg	2nd leg
SV Brixen Handball (Italy)	48–66	(Greece) Olympiacos S.F.P.	23–29	25–37
Beşiktaş (Turkey)	68–73	(Hungary) FTC-Green Collect	32–34	36–39
CS Minaur Baia Mare (Romania)	70–51	(Bosnia and Herzegovina) RK Vogošća	36–26	34–25
RK Sloboda (Bosnia and Herzegovina)	41–48	(Slovenia) MRK Krka	15–19	26–29
CSA Steaua București (Romania)	57–56	(Czech Republic) HCB Karviná	28–27	29–29
Valur (Iceland)	57–54	(Serbia) HC Metaloplastika Elixir Šabac	27–26	30–28
Förthof UHK Krems (Austria)	56–59	(Austria) Bregenz Handball	26–26	30–33
FH Hafnarfjarðar (Iceland)	58–61	(Slovakia) Tatran Prešov	35–30	23–31

== Quarterfinals ==
The first leg matches were held on 23–24 March 2024, while the second leg matches were held on 30–31 March 2024. The draw was on the 20 February 2024.

Results

Team 1	Agg.	Team 2	1st leg	2nd leg
Olympiacos S.F.P. (Greece)	56–45	(Slovenia) MRK Krka	31–26	25–19
FTC-Green Collect (Hungary)	63–57	(Slovakia) Tatran Prešov	32–29	31–28
CSA Steaua București (Romania)	65–72	(Iceland) Valur	35–36	30–36
CS Minaur Baia Mare (Romania)	65–61	(Austria) Bregenz Handball	37–31	28–30

=== Matches ===
23 March 2024; 20:30	Olympiacos S.F.P. (Greece)	31–26	(Slovenia) MRK Krka	Indoor Sports Hall of Ilioupolis, Ilioupolis; Attendance: 550; Referees: Xhema, Jahja (KOS)
23 March 2024; 20:30	Savvas 7	(16–13)	Majstorović 9	Indoor Sports Hall of Ilioupolis, Ilioupolis; Attendance: 550; Referees: Xhema, Jahja (KOS)
23 March 2024; 20:30	1× (yellow card) 6× (suspension)	Report	6× (suspension)	Indoor Sports Hall of Ilioupolis, Ilioupolis; Attendance: 550; Referees: Xhema, Jahja (KOS)

30 March 2024; 17:00	MRK Krka (Slovenia)	19–25	(Greece) Olympiacos S.F.P.	Športna Dvorana Marof, Novo mesto Attendance: 400; Referees: Jovic, Arnautovic (BIH)
30 March 2024; 17:00	Majstorović, Muhić 5	(10–10)	Savvas, Vida 4	Športna Dvorana Marof, Novo mesto Attendance: 400; Referees: Jovic, Arnautovic (BIH)
30 March 2024; 17:00	5× (suspension) 1× (red card)	Report	1× (yellow card) 4× (suspension)	Športna Dvorana Marof, Novo mesto Attendance: 400; Referees: Jovic, Arnautovic (BIH)

Olympiacos S.F.P. won 56–45 on aggregate.

23 March 2024; 20:00	FTC-Green Collect (Hungary)	32–29	(Slovakia) Tatran Prešov	Elek Gyula Aréna, Budapest; Attendance: 800; Referees: Radcenko, Persis (LAT)
23 March 2024; 20:00	Imre 9	(17–15)	Urban 7	Elek Gyula Aréna, Budapest; Attendance: 800; Referees: Radcenko, Persis (LAT)
23 March 2024; 20:00	2× (yellow card) 4× (suspension) 1× (red card)	Report	2× (yellow card) 2× (suspension)	Elek Gyula Aréna, Budapest; Attendance: 800; Referees: Radcenko, Persis (LAT)

30 March 2024; 18:00	Tatran Prešov (Slovakia)	28–31	(Hungary) FTC-Green Collect	Tatran Handball Arena, Prešov; Attendance: 4,000; Referees: Ivanovic, Vujisic (MNE)
30 March 2024; 18:00	Cabarello Hernandez 9	(13–11)	Nagy 7	Tatran Handball Arena, Prešov; Attendance: 4,000; Referees: Ivanovic, Vujisic (MNE)
30 March 2024; 18:00	1× (yellow card) 4× (suspension)	Report	1× (yellow card) 6× (suspension)	Tatran Handball Arena, Prešov; Attendance: 4,000; Referees: Ivanovic, Vujisic (MNE)

FTC-Green Collect won 63–57 on aggregate.

23 March 2024; 19:00	CSA Steaua București (Romania)	35–36	(Iceland) Valur	Concordia Sports Hall, Bucharest; Attendance: 325; Referees: Cipov, Klus (SVK)
23 March 2024; 19:00	Tarita 7	(14–18)	Óskarsson, Thordarson 7	Concordia Sports Hall, Bucharest; Attendance: 325; Referees: Cipov, Klus (SVK)
23 March 2024; 19:00	2× (yellow card) 4× (suspension)	Report	2× (yellow card) 5× (suspension)	Concordia Sports Hall, Bucharest; Attendance: 325; Referees: Cipov, Klus (SVK)

30 March 2024; 19:00	Valur (Iceland)	36–30	(Romania) CSA Steaua București	N1 höllin, Reykjavík; Attendance: 657; Referees: Maia, Nunes (POR)
30 March 2024; 19:00	Petersson 8	(21–12)	Șandru 7	N1 höllin, Reykjavík; Attendance: 657; Referees: Maia, Nunes (POR)
30 March 2024; 19:00	5× (suspension) 1× (red card)	Report	4× (suspension)	N1 höllin, Reykjavík; Attendance: 657; Referees: Maia, Nunes (POR)

Valur won 72–65 on aggregate.

23 March 2024; 18:00	CS Minaur Baia Mare (Romania)	37–31	(Austria) Bregenz Handball	Lascăr Pană Sports Hall, Baia Mare; Attendance: 2,218; Referees: Fahner, Kubis (POL)
23 March 2024; 18:00	Vujović 9	(17–14)	Mahr 11	Lascăr Pană Sports Hall, Baia Mare; Attendance: 2,218; Referees: Fahner, Kubis (POL)
23 March 2024; 18:00	1× (yellow card) 4× (suspension)	Report	1× (yellow card) 2× (suspension)	Lascăr Pană Sports Hall, Baia Mare; Attendance: 2,218; Referees: Fahner, Kubis (POL)

30 March 2024; 18:00	Bregenz Handball (Austria)	30–28	(Romania) CS Minaur Baia Mare	Sporthalle Rieden-Vorkloster, Bregenz; Attendance: 1,500; Referees: Doychinov, Gorestov (BUL)
30 March 2024; 18:00	Mahr 8	(18–16)	Vujović 7	Sporthalle Rieden-Vorkloster, Bregenz; Attendance: 1,500; Referees: Doychinov, Gorestov (BUL)
30 March 2024; 18:00	2× (suspension)	Report	1× (yellow card) 7× (suspension) 1× (red card)	Sporthalle Rieden-Vorkloster, Bregenz; Attendance: 1,500; Referees: Doychinov, Gorestov (BUL)

CS Minaur Baia Mare won 65–61 on aggregate.

== Semifinals ==
The first leg matches were held on 20–21 April 2024, while the second leg matches were held on 27–28 April 2024. The draw was on the 20 February 2024.

Results

Team 1	Agg.	Team 2	1st leg	2nd leg
FTC-Green Collect (Hungary)	60–67	(Greece) Olympiacos S.F.P.	28–28	32–39
Valur (Iceland)	66–52	(Romania) CS Minaur Baia Mare	36–28	30–24

=== Matches ===
20 April 2024; 14:00	FTC-Green Collect (Hungary)	28–28	(Greece) Olympiacos S.F.P.	Elek Gyula Aréna, Budapest; Attendance: 857; Referees: Sniurevicius, Grigalionis (LTU)
20 April 2024; 14:00	Imre 8	(13–11)	Savvas 8	Elek Gyula Aréna, Budapest; Attendance: 857; Referees: Sniurevicius, Grigalionis (LTU)
20 April 2024; 14:00	1× (suspension)	Report	1× (yellow card) 3× (suspension)	Elek Gyula Aréna, Budapest; Attendance: 857; Referees: Sniurevicius, Grigalionis (LTU)

27 April 2024; 15:30	Olympiacos S.F.P. (Greece)	39–32	(Hungary) FTC-Green Collect	Indoor Sports Hall of Ilioupolis, Ilioupolis; Attendance: 1,100; Referees: Cernavskis, Ivars (LAT)
27 April 2024; 15:30	Savvas 10	(21–18)	Nagy 8	Indoor Sports Hall of Ilioupolis, Ilioupolis; Attendance: 1,100; Referees: Cernavskis, Ivars (LAT)
27 April 2024; 15:30	1× (yellow card)	Report	2× (yellow card)	Indoor Sports Hall of Ilioupolis, Ilioupolis; Attendance: 1,100; Referees: Cernavskis, Ivars (LAT)

Olympiacos S.F.P. won 67–60 on aggregate

20 April 2024; 21:30	Valur (Iceland)	36–28	(Romania) CS Minaur Baia Mare	N1 höllin, Reykjavík; Attendance: 1,239; Referees: Andorka, Hucker (HUN)
20 April 2024; 21:30	Óskarsson 8	(18–14)	Vujić 7	N1 höllin, Reykjavík; Attendance: 1,239; Referees: Andorka, Hucker (HUN)
20 April 2024; 21:30	1× (yellow card) 5× (suspension)	Report	3× (yellow card) 5× (suspension)	N1 höllin, Reykjavík; Attendance: 1,239; Referees: Andorka, Hucker (HUN)

28 April 2024; 17:00	CS Minaur Baia Mare (Romania)	24–30	(Iceland) Valur	Lascăr Pană Sports Hall, Baia Mare; Attendance: 621; Referees: Mikelic, Paradina (CRO)
28 April 2024; 17:00	Botea 5	(8–17)	Finnsson 9	Lascăr Pană Sports Hall, Baia Mare; Attendance: 621; Referees: Mikelic, Paradina (CRO)
28 April 2024; 17:00	1× (yellow card)	Report		Lascăr Pană Sports Hall, Baia Mare; Attendance: 621; Referees: Mikelic, Paradina (CRO)

Valur won 66–52 on aggregate

== Final ==
The first leg match was held on 18 May 2024, while the second leg match was held on 25 May 2024. The draw was on the 30 April 2024.

Results

Team 1	Agg.	Team 2	1st leg	2nd leg
Valur (Iceland)	57–57; 5–4 (p)	(Greece) Olympiacos S.F.P.	30–26	27–31

=== Matches ===
18 May 2024; 19:00	Valur (Iceland)	30–26	(Greece) Olympiacos S.F.P.	N1 höllin, Reykjavík; Attendance: 1,750; Referees: Jerlecki, Labun (POL)
18 May 2024; 19:00	Óskarsson 10	(14–14)	Savvas 10	N1 höllin, Reykjavík; Attendance: 1,750; Referees: Jerlecki, Labun (POL)
18 May 2024; 19:00	2× (suspension)	Report	1× (yellow card) 4× (suspension)	N1 höllin, Reykjavík; Attendance: 1,750; Referees: Jerlecki, Labun (POL)

25 May 2024
20:00
Olympiacos S.F.P. (Greece)
35–32
(Iceland) Valur
Peace and Friendship Stadium, Piraeus
Attendance: 7,500
Referees: Sekulić, Jovandić (SRB)
Savvas 10
(16–11)
Gústafsson 8
2× (yellow card) 3× (suspension)
Report
2× (yellow card) 5× (suspension)

FT: 31–27 Pen: 4–5

57–57 on aggregate, Valur won 5–4 on penalties

== See also ==
- 2023–24 EHF Champions League
- 2023–24 EHF European League
- 2023–24 Women's EHF Champions League
- 2023–24 Women's EHF European League
- 2023–24 Women's EHF European Cup
