= Tatran Prešov in European handball =

This article contains all results of the handball team HT Tatran Prešov in European competitions.

Competitions

- Q = Qualifying
- R1 = First round
- R2 = Second round
- R3 = Third round
- L16 = Last 16
- QF = Quarter-final
- SF = Semi-final
- F = Final
- B = Bronze medal match
- G-X = Group stage, Group X

Season	Competition	Round	Opponent	Home	Away	Aggregate
2004–05	EHF Champions League	Q	(Austria) A1 Bergenz HB	35–21	28–32	63–53
2004–05	EHF Champions League	G-H	(Germany) SG Flensburg-Handewitt	24–24	30–38	2nd
2004–05	EHF Champions League	G-H	(Czech Republic) HC Baník Karviná	22–25	32–29	2nd
2004–05	EHF Champions League	G-H	(Croatia) RK Metković	37–24	29–18	2nd
2004–05	EHF Champions League	L16	(Germany) THW Kiel	32–38	25–41	57–79
2005–06	EHF Champions League	G-F	(Hungary) MKB Veszprém KC	23–35	25–42	3rd
2005–06	EHF Champions League	G-F	(Spain) BM Ciudad Real	28–32	24–39	3rd
2005–06	EHF Champions League	G-F	(Romania) Dinamo Baumit București	30–25	24–28	3rd
2005–06	EHF Cup Winners' Cup	L16	(Bosnia and Herzegovina) RK Sloga Doboj	33–23	31–27	64–50
2005–06	EHF Cup Winners' Cup	QF	(Russia) Chekhovskiye Medvedi	27–30	28–35	55–65
2006–07	EHF Cup	R1	(Luxembourg) HB Dudelange	41–29	34–25	75–54
2006–07	EHF Cup	R2	(Serbia) Jugopetrol Železničar Niš	31–22	28–30	59–52
2006–07	EHF Cup	R3	(France) Dunkerque Handball Grand Littoral	25–26	28–31	53–57
2007–08	EHF Champions League	G-D	(Spain) Portland San Antonio	29–35	29–40	4th
2007–08	EHF Champions League	G-D	(Denmark) GOG Svendborg	31–38	32–42	4th
2007–08	EHF Champions League	G-D	(Austria) A1 Bergenz HB	31–26	30–30	4th
2007–08	EHF Cup Winners' Cup	L16	(Spain) BM Valladolid	29–33	29–38	58–71
2008–09	EHF Champions League	G-D	(Germany) HSV Hamburg	26–35	20–32	3rd
2008–09	EHF Champions League	G-D	(Denmark) FCK Håndbold	32–33	29–33	3rd
2008–09	EHF Champions League	G-D	(Serbia) ER Belgrade	27–23	31–27	3rd
2008–09	EHF Cup Winners' Cup	L16	(Romania) H.C.M. Constanța	33–25	20–31	53–56
2009–10	EHF Champions League	Q-G4	(Portugal) F.C. Porto	–	–	33–30
2009–10	EHF Champions League	Q-G4	(Poland) Vive Targi Kielce	–	–	31–38
2009–10	EHF Cup	R2	(Iceland) Fram Reykjavík	38–17	27–23	65–40
2009–10	EHF Cup	R3	(Hungary) Dunaferr SE	27–19	22–23	49–42
2009–10	EHF Cup	R16	(Slovenia) RK Celje	25–26	32–35	57–61
2010–11	EHF Champions League	Q-G1	(Austria) A1 Bregenz	–	–	27–25
2010–11	EHF Champions League	Q-G1	(Turkey) Beşiktaş J.K.	–	–	30–27
2010–11	EHF Champions League	Q-G1	(Norway) Drammen HK	–	–	35–35
2010–11	EHF Champions League	G-B	(Hungary) MKB Veszprém	27–35	22–33	6th
2010–11	EHF Champions League	G-B	(Denmark) KIF Kolding	29–31	27–28	6th
2010–11	EHF Champions League	G-B	(Sweden) IK Sävehof	31–31	32–33	6th
2010–11	EHF Champions League	G-B	(France) Montpellier HB	31–33	25–40	6th
2010–11	EHF Champions League	G-B	(Germany) HSV Hamburg	26–26	23–35	6th
2011–12	EHF Champions League	Q-SF	(Portugal) F.C. Porto	–	–	28–29
2011–12	EHF Champions League	Q-B	(Greece) AEK Athens H.C.	–	–	40–23
2011–12	EHF Cup	R3	(Portugal) Madeira SA	27–19	24–24	51–43
2011–12	EHF Cup	R16	(Denmark) Nordsjælland Håndbold	30–20	29–23	59–43
2011–12	EHF Cup	QF	(Germany) SC Magdeburg	29–29	22–26	51–55
2012–13	EHF Champions League	Q-SF	(Israel) Maccabi Rishon LeZion	–	–	36–20
2012–13	EHF Champions League	Q-F	(Romania) HCM Constanța	–	–	21–26
2012–13	EHF Cup	R3	(Bosnia and Herzegovina) Borac Banja Luka	36–25	30–25	66–50
2012–13	EHF Cup	G-A	(Germany) Rhein-Neckar Löwen	33–34	20–36	3rd
2012–13	EHF Cup	G-A	(Denmark) KIF Kolding	29–22	17–37	3rd
2012–13	EHF Cup	G-A	(Ukraine) Motor Zaporizhzhia	36–28	32–27	3rd
2013–14	EHF Champions League	Q-SF	(Turkey) Beşiktaş J.K.	–	–	32–30
2013–14	EHF Champions League	Q-F	(Belarus) HC Dinamo Minsk	–	–	27–29
2013–14	EHF Cup	R3	(Slovenia) Maribor Branik	34–26	28–30	62–56
2013–14	EHF Cup	G-C	(Hungary) SC Pick Szeged	29-31	37-31	3rd
2013–14	EHF Cup	G-C	(France) HBC Nantes	37-27	30-29	3rd
2013–14	EHF Cup	G-C	(Sweden) IFK Kristianstad	37-30	34-27	3rd
2014-15	EHF Champions League	Q-SF	(Serbia) RK Vojvodina	-	-	21-25
2014-15	EHF Champions League	Q-F	(Belarus) HC Meshkov Brest	-	-	26-24
2014-15	EHF Cup	R3	(Germany) MT Melsungen	31-24	26-25	56-50
2015-16	EHF Champions League	G-C	(Belarus) HC Meshkov Brest	20-30	26-32	6th
2015-16	EHF Champions League	G-C	(Spain) La Rioja	19-21	29-37	6th
2015-16	EHF Champions League	G-C	(Portugal) F.C. Porto	24-25	23-33	6th
2015-16	EHF Champions League	G-C	(Russia) Chekhovskiye Medvedi	27-21	28-29	6th
2015-16	EHF Champions League	G-C	(Serbia) RK Vojvodina	19-27	25-24	6th
2016-17	EHF Champions League	Q-SF	(Luxembourg) Red Boys Differdange	-	-	38-32
2016-17	EHF Champions League	Q-F	(Slovenia) RK Gorenje Velenje	-	-	23-21
2016-17	EHF Champions League	G-C	(France) Montpellier HB	24-28	23-28	4th
2016-17	EHF Champions League	G-C	(Spain) La Rioja	30-27	27-33	4th
2016-17	EHF Champions League	G-C	(North Macedonia) RK Metalurg Skopje	27-22	20-26	4th
2016-17	EHF Champions League	G-C	(Norway) Elverum Håndball	25-27	24-24	4th
2016-17	EHF Champions League	G-C	(Russia) Chekhovskiye Medvedi	30-28	29-28	4th
2017-18	EHF Cup	Q-R3	(Iceland) FH Hafnarfjarðar	24-21	23-26	47-47
2017-18	EHF Cup	G-A	(Germany) SC Magdeburg	19-29	24-36	4th
2017-18	EHF Cup	G-A	(Denmark) Bjerringbro-Silkeborg	32-28	19-27	4th
2017-18	EHF Cup	G-A	(Belarus) SKA Minsk	25-25	27-34	4th
2018-19	EHF Champions League	G-C	(Denmark) Bjerringbro-Silkeborg	26-24	30-29	3rd
2018-19	EHF Champions League	G-C	(Portugal) Sporting CP	27-30	28-26	3rd
2018-19	EHF Champions League	G-C	(Russia) Chekhovskiye Medvedi	27-28	26-38	3rd
2018-19	EHF Champions League	G-C	(Turkey) Beşiktaş JK	27-23	28-22	3rd
2018-19	EHF Champions League	G-C	(North Macedonia) RK Metalurg Skopje	30-24	29-24	3rd
2019-20	EHF Champions League	G-C	(Spain) CD Bidasoa	23-25	27-27	4th
2019-20	EHF Champions League	G-C	(Portugal) Sporting CP	22-37	24-32	4th
2019-20	EHF Champions League	G-C	(Sweden) IK Sävehof	23-28	29-30	4th
2019-20	EHF Champions League	G-C	(Finland) Riihimäki Cocks	30-19	27-29	4th
2019-20	EHF Champions League	G-C	(North Macedonia) Eurofarm Rabotnik	31-29	24-23	4th
2020-21	EHF European League	G-B	(Germany) Füchse Berlin	10-0	27-35	6th
2020-21	EHF European League	G-B	(France) USAM Nîmes Gard	22-28	20-25	6th
2020-21	EHF European League	G-B	(Sweden) IFK Kristianstad	22-27	25-32	6th
2020-21	EHF European League	G-B	(Portugal) Sporting CP	24-21	21-27	6th
2020-21	EHF European League	G-B	(Romania) Dinamo București	32-27	30-32	6th
2021-22	EHF European League	G-A	(Poland) Wisła Płock	15-29	29-33	5th
2021-22	EHF European League	G-A	(Germany) Füchse Berlin	23-27	23-36	5th
2021-22	EHF European League	G-A	(France) Fenix Toulouse Handball	19-31	20-34	5th
2021-22	EHF European League	G-A	(Spain) CD Bidasoa	27-25	24-33	5th
2021-22	EHF European League	G-A	(Switzerland) Pfadi Winterthur	29-33	31-27	5th
2022-23	EHF European League	G-A	(France) Montpellier HB	35-27	30-41	5th
2022-23	EHF European League	G-A	(Germany) Frisch Auf Göppingen	26-28	24-34	5th
2022-23	EHF European League	G-A	(Switzerland) Kadetten Schaffhausen	31-37	30-38	5th
2022-23	EHF European League	G-A	(Portugal) SL Benfica	25-29	28-35	5th
2022-23	EHF European League	G-A	(Hungary) Veszprém KKFT	22-20	28-30	5th
2023-24	EHF European Cup	R2	(Czech Republic) HK FCC Město Lovosice	36-26	32-28	68-54
2023-24	EHF European Cup	R3	(Iceland) Ungmennafélagið Afturelding	28-25	27-24	55-49
2023-24	EHF European Cup	L16	(Iceland) FH Hafnarfjarðar	31-23	30-35	61-58
2023-24	EHF European Cup	QF	(Hungary) Ferencvárosi TC	28-31	29-32	57-63
2024-25	EHF European League	G-C	(Portugal) SL Benfica	16-24	23-36	4th
2024-25	EHF European League	G-C	(France) Limoges Handball	21-34	24-31	4th
2024-25	EHF European League	G-C	(Switzerland) Kadetten Schaffhausen	30-39	26-39	4th
2025-26	EHF European League	G-G	(Germany) TSV Hannover-Burgdorf	29-37	28-40	4th
2025-26	EHF European League	G-G	(Denmark) Fredericia HK	27-34	30-38	4th
2025-26	EHF European League	G-G	(Sweden) IK Sävehof	30-30	28-33	4th
