= 2016–17 Turkish Handball Super League =

Turkish Handball Super League
- Season: 2016–17
- Champions: Beşiktaş J.K. (13th title)
- EHF Champions League: Beşiktaş J.K.
- EHF Cup: Beykoz Belediyesi GSK
- EHF Challenge Cup: Göztepe S.K.
- Matches played: 182
- Goals scored: 10,117 (55.59 per match)
- All statistics correct as of 16 May 2017.

The 2016–17 Turkish Handball Super League is the 39th season of the Turkish Handball Super League, Turkish's top-tier handball league. A total of fourteen teams contest this season's league, which began on 17 September 2016 and is scheduled to conclude in April 2017.

Beşiktaş J.K. are the defending champions, having beaten BB Ankara Spor 3–0 in the previous season's playoff finals.

== Format ==
The competition format for the 2016–17 season consists of a home-and-away round-robin system.

== Teams ==
2016–17 Turkish Handball Super League teams

The following 14 clubs compete in the Turkish Handball Super League during the 2016–17 season. Marmara Gücü SK, Trabzon and Ankara Il Özel Idare were relegated from the previous season and Beykoz Belediyesi GSK, Selçuklu Belediyespor, Aziziye Belediyesi Termal Spor and Yozgat Bozok Spor were promoted from 2015-16 Turkish 1.lig.

Team	City	Arena
Amasya Taşova YİBO SK	Amasya	Taşova Spor Salonu
BB Ankara Spor	Ankara	THF Sport Hall
Antalyaspor	Antalya	Antalya Arena Spor Salonu
Aziziye Belediyesi Termal Spor	Erzurum	Aziziye spor salonu
Beşiktaş J.K.	Istanbul	Süleyman Seba Sport Complex
Beykoz Belediyesi GSK	Istanbul	Recep Şahin Köktürk Spor Salonu
Göztepe S.K.	İzmir	Bülent Özkul Spor Salonu
Merzifon Belediye Hentbol SK	Amasya	Suluova Mahmut Demir Spor Salonu
Maliye Milli Piyango SK	Ankara	THF Sport Hall
Nilüfer Belediyespor	Bursa	Üçevler Spor Tesisleri
Selçuklu Belediyespor	Konya	Yazır Spor Salonunda
Trabzonspor	Trabzon	19 Mayis Spor Salonu
Yozgat Bozok Spor	Yozgat	Bozok Üniversitesi Spor Salonu
MYK Hentbol SK	Ankara	THF Sport Hall

== Standings ==
Pos	Team	Pld	W	D	L	GF	GA	GD	Pts	Qualification
1	Beşiktaş J.K.	26	25	0	1	875	707	+168	50	2017–18 EHF Champions League
2	Beykoz Belediyesi GSK	26	17	4	5	716	666	+50	38	2017–18 EHF Cup
3	Göztepe S.K.	26	16	4	6	686	652	+34	36	2017–18 EHF Challenge Cup
4	BB Ankara Spor	26	16	2	8	752	722	+30	34	
5	Aziziye Belediyesi Termal Spor	26	15	2	9	798	737	+61	32	
6	Merzifon Belediye Hentbol SK	26	13	3	10	702	691	+11	29	
7	MYK Hentbol SK	26	11	2	13	661	673	−12	24	
8	Antalyaspor	26	11	1	14	699	710	−11	23	
9	Amasya Taşova YİBO SK	26	10	1	15	763	773	−10	21	
10	Nilüfer Belediyespor	26	9	3	14	668	680	−12	21	
11	Maliye Milli Piyango SK	26	9	2	15	643	706	−63	20	
12	Yozgat Bozok Spor	26	9	1	16	704	753	−49	19	
13	Trabzonspor	26	3	6	17	696	781	−85	12	
14	Selçuklu Belediyespor	26	2	1	23	754	866	−112	5	

Updated to match(es) played on 16 May 2017. Source: Turkish Handball Super League

== Results ==
Home \ Away	AMA	ANK	ANT	AZI	BES	BEY	GOZ	MAL	MER	MYK	NIL	SEL	TRA	YOZ
Amasya Taşova YİBO SK		29–31	33–31	34–35	23–27	26–27	29–25	26–27	26–30	23–23	33–30	34–33	40–31	28–33
BB Ankara Spor	39–32		30–26	27–26	25–30	29–30	28–24	31–23	25–25	28–27	29–23	34–33	29–27	25–27
Antalyaspor	32–29	27–30		27–28	25–36	26–26	22–28	30–29	32–26	25–22	23–25	34–31	33–28	33–29
Aziziye Belediyesi Termal Spor	37–26	40–40	27–23		29–31	27–26	24–23	28–25	27–27	40–23	29–25	33–32	31–24	41–27
Beşiktaş J.K.	36–31	31–26	36–25	36–30		33–27	31–25	38–33	38–33	27–25	40–27	33–29	35–29	38–27
Beykoz Belediyesi GSK	31–28	25–28	25–24	29–28	22–29		25–27	23–20	34–30	28–27	20–19	35–28	34–29	33–20
Göztepe S.K.	33–23	25–24	26–24	27–26	23–32	22–22		30–24	24–21	24–22	27–25	41–30	22–20	25–25
Maliye Milli Piyango SK	23–34	20–29	20–19	28–26	21–36	23–27	20–22		28–27	24–30	23–26	28–22	24–23	21–24
Merzifon Belediye Hentbol SK	26–37	26–21	27–24	32–30	25–28	24–25	26–23	26–26		26–25	20–18	37–30	30–20	30–27
MYK Hentbol SK	28–23	22–25	22–26	27–26	26–33	19–34	24–24	23–25	26–16		21–22	41–31	28–25	30–27
Nilüfer Belediyespor	22–24	30–22	32–29	29–28	29–33	24–24	21–22	24–26	22–25	20–22		28–25	30–30	35–29
Selçuklu Belediyespor	30–27	34–40	20–31	33–34	29–42	27–30	29–37	31–32	25–31	25–27	26–34		29–21	35–42
Trabzonspor	29–37	30–32	20–22	29–35	35–34	25–25	26–26	28–28	25–24	25–29	30–30	31–31		33–28
Yozgat Bozok Spor	24–28	29–25	25–26	27–33	28–31	24–29	29–31	23–22	25–32	21–22	20–18	29–26	35–23	

Legend: Blue = home team win; Yellow = draw; Red = away team win.
