= İlknur Kurtuluş =

Turkish handball coach (born 1972)

Personal information
- Born: 1972 (age 53–54) Turkey

Sport
- Sport: Handball

Teams managed
- Years: Team
- 2023–: Nilüfer Bld.

İlknur Kurtuluş (born 1972) is a Turkish former school teacher and serves as a handball coach. She is the successful female head coach of a top-level men's team in Turkey.

== Sport career ==
Kurtuluş started her career coaching girls' teams during the time she worked as a school teacher of physical education. After she moved to Bursa, she joined Nilüfer Bld., and served as the coach of the youth system team. The boys' youth team, she led, won championships in Bursa and later at national level.

In July 2023, she was appointed as the head coach of the Nilüfer Bld., which compete in the Turkish Men's Handball Super League. With this role, she became the first woman to head a men's handball team in the top-level league. She assembled a young squad with an average age of around 22.5 years she knew from the club's youth system, and began preparations for the upcoming season. The team's assistant coach was her student already from the primary school time. Most of the technical staff are teachers of physical education.

Nilüfer Bld. completed the 2023–24 Super League season on the fourth place after defeating Spor Toto in the play-off for 4th/5th place match. The 2024–25 Super League season ended for her team as the runner-up after they lost the play-off series final to Beşiktaş. She won with her team the 2025 Super Cup in August after defating the league champion and the title-defender Beşiktaş in the play-off final series by 3–0. It was her team's first cup victory. Her achievement as the first female head coach to lead a men's handball team to a top-level cup made history in Turkish sports. Under her leadership, Nilüfer Bld. reached the quarterfinals at the 2025–26 EHF European Cup.

== Personal life ==
lknur Kurtuluş was born in 1972.

She studied Physical Education and Sport in the Faculty of Sports Science at Bursa Uludağ University, and completed her education in 1993. After graduation, she worked as a teacher of physical education in a primary school, and later in a middle school in Osmangazi, Bursa.
