= İlknur =

İlknur is a Turkish feminine given name. It may refer to:

- İlknur Akdoğan (born 1969), Turkish windsurfer
- İlknur Melis Durası (born 1989), Turkish model, bioengineer and beauty pageant
- İlknur Kobaş (born 1977), Turkish judoka
- İlknur Kurtuluş (born 1972), Turkish female handball coach
