= Tolga Özbahar =

Turkish handball player (born 1984)

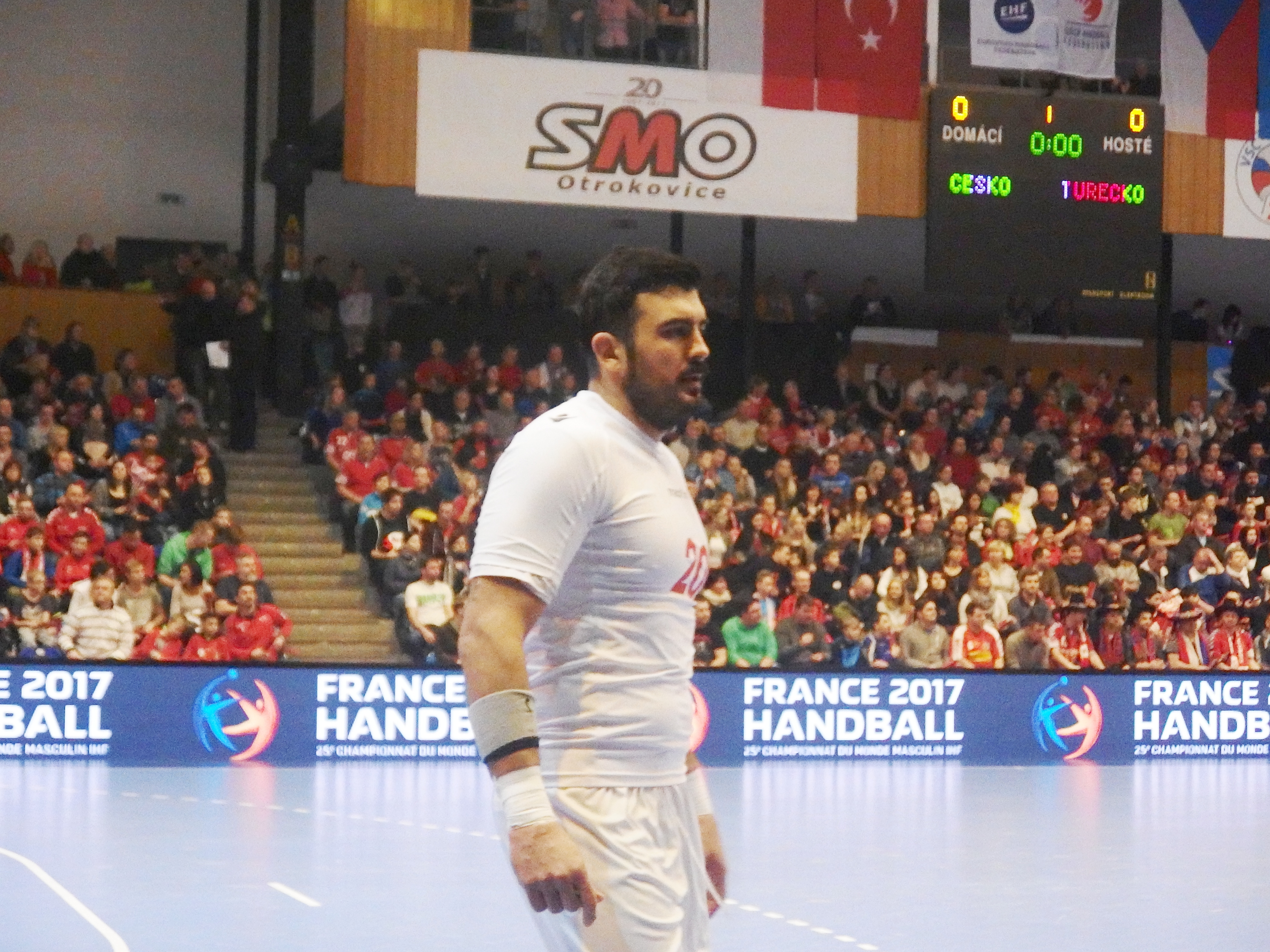

Personal information
- Nationality: Turkish
- Born: 24 April 1984 (age 42) Aydın, Turkey
- Height: 1.95 m (6 ft 5 in)

Sport
- Sport: Handball
- Position: Line player
- Current club: Nilüfer Bld.
- Number: 20

Senior clubs
- Years: Team
- 2008-2010: İzmir BB
- 2010-2020: Beşiktaş
- 2021-2023: İzmir BB
- 2024-2025: Beykoz Bld.
- 2025-: Nilüfer Bld.
National team
- Years: Team
- –: Turkey

Tolga Özbahar (born 24 April 1984) is a Turkish handballer who plays for Nilüfer Bld. and the Turkey national team.

== Sport career ==
Özbahar started his handball career at Aydın PTT SK. He played for Mersin Yenişehir Bld. and İzmir BB. He then transferred to Beşiktaş in Istanbul. He had achieved many successes since 2010. In 2020, he left Beşiktaş, and returned to İzmir BB. With the İzmir team, they won the Turkish Men's Handball Cup in 2021 by defeating Beşiktaş 30–28 in the final. In the 2024–25 season, he moved to Istanbu again, and joined Beykoz Bld. For the 2025-26 Super League season, he transferred to the Bursa->based Nilüfer Bld..

He plays as line player.

== Personal life ==
Tolga Özbahar eas born in Aydın, western Turkey on 24 April 1984. He is married to Derya Özbahar, and the couple has two children.
