= THF Serdar Seymen Handball Hall =

Indoor arena in Istanbul, Turkey

THF Serdar Seymen Handball Hall THF Serdar Seymen Hentbol Salonu
- Interactive map of THF Serdar Seymen Handball Hall; THF Serdar Seymen Hentbol Salonu
- Location: Baklacı Mah., Seyit Gazi Sok.. 365/22, 34830 Beykoz, İstanbul
- Coordinates: 41.063959°N 29.110401°E

Construction
- Opened: 9 May 2026; 3 months ago

The THF Serdar Seymen Handball Hall (Turkish: THF Serdar Seymen Hentbol Salonu) is an indoor arena of the Turkish Handball Federation (THF) for handball matches located in Beykoz, Istanbul, Turkey. It was opened on 9 May 2026.

The sport hall is named in honor of Serdar Seymen, the head coach of the Sport Toto men's handball team, who died as a result of heart attack during the half-time of his team's league match on 15 February 2025.

After the official opening ceremony, the venue hosted the final match of the 2026 Women's THF 50th Anniversary Federation Cup between Bursa Büyükşehir BSK and Üsküdar BSK that was won by the Bursa Büyükşehir BSK.
