= Onur Ersin =

Turkish handball player (born 1992)

Personal information
- Nationality: Turkish
- Born: 20 March 1992 (age 34) Samsun, Turkey
- Height: 1.85 m (6 ft 1 in)

Sport
- Sport: Handball
- Position: Center back
- Current club: Nilüfer Bld.
- Number: 10

Senior clubs
- Years: Team
- 2009-2016: BB Ankara
- 2016-2020: Beşiktaş
- 2020: Dobrogea Sud Constanța
- 2020-2021: Beşiktaş
- 2021-2022: Riihimäki Cocks
- 2023-2024: Sakarya BB
- 2024-2025: Beykoz Bld.
- 2025-: Nilüfer Bld.
National team
- Years: Team
- 2020-: Turkey

Onur Ersin (born 20 March 1992) is a Turkish handballer who plays for Nilüfer Bld. and the Turkey national team.

== Sport career ==
Ersin played for BB Ankara (2009–2016), Beşiktaş (2016–2020), Dobrogea Sud Constanța in Romania (2020), Beşiktaş again (2020–2021), Riihimäki Cocks in Finland (2021–2022), Sakarya BB (2023–2024), Beykoz Bld. (2024–2025). For the 2025-26 Super League season, he transferred to the Bursa->based Nilüfer Bld..

He plays as center back.

== Personal life ==
Onur Ersin eas born in Samsun, northern Turkey on 20 March 1992. He is married to Melike Ersin. The couple has a daughter.
