= Spor Toto =

Spor Toto may refer to:

- Spor Toto Akhisar Stadium, a football stadium in Turkey
- Spor Toto Cup, Turkish professional footbal cup sponsored by the Spor Toto Organization
- Spor Toto Cycling Team, cycling team of Spor Toto SK vşn Turkey
- Spor Toto SK, a multi-sport club in Turkey
- Spor Toto SK (fencing), a fencing team in Turkey
- Spor Toto SK (men's handball), a handball team in Turkey
- Spor Toto SK (men's volleyball), a volleyball team in Turkey
- Spor Toto Super League, Turkish professional footbal league sponsored by the Spor Toto Organization
- Spor Toto World Cup 10, 10th edition of FIBA Basketball World Cup held in Turkey
