= Nilüfer Belediyespor (men's handball) =

Turkish professional handball team

- Full name: Nilüfer Belediye Spor Kulübü
- Short name: Nilüfer BSK
- Founded: 1999; 27 years ago
- Arena: [Üçevler Spor Tesisleri
- Capacity: 500
- President: Muharrem Or
- Head coach: İlknur Kurtuluş
- League: Turkish Men's Handball Super League
- Club colours

Nilüfer Belediyespor Handball Team is the professional handball team of Nilüfer Belediyespor, which is a Turkish sports club from Bursa, that plays in the Turkish Men's Handball Super League.

Location of Nilüfer Belediyespor

== History ==
The club was founded on 4 August 1999 in the Nilüfer district of Bursa Province. The club is particularly known for its successes in women's volleyball and men's handball.

== Management ==
Position	Name
President	(Turkey) Muharrem Or
Vice President	(Turkey) İlker Mehmet Şener
Vice President	(Turkey) Gülver Deniz
Member Of The Board	(Turkey) Fikret Ocakoğlu
Member Of The Board	(Turkey) Orkan Akyürek
Member Of The Board	(Turkey) Düzgün Şimşek
Member Of The Board	(Turkey) Adalet Yılmaz

== Team ==
=== Current squad ===
Squad for the 2025–26 season

Nilüfer Belediyespor

Goalkeepers

- 1 (Turkey) Emre Yildirim
- 42 (Turkey) Mehmet Emre
- 99 (Turkey) Hüseyin Bereket

Left Wingers

- 44 (Turkey) Mehmet Furkan Polater
- 74 (Turkey) Furkan Özcan
- 77 (Turkey) Gökay Bilim

Right Wingers

- 4 (Bosnia and Herzegovina) Vladan Djurdjević
- 14 (Turkey) Durmuş Mutlu

Line Players

- 20 (Turkey) Tolga Özbahar
- 27 (Turkey) Eren Soycan
- 48 (Turkey) Çağlayan Öztürk

Left Backs

- 11 (Turkey) Genco Ilanç
- 23 (Iran) Reza Yadegari
- 24 (Turkey) Gürkan Soğukpinar

Central Backs

- 10 (Turkey) Onur Ersin
- 19 (Turkey) Ramazan Mutlu
- 33 (Brazil) Gabriel Rosa

Right Backs

- 26 (Bosnia and Herzegovina) Dean Šešić
- 46 (Turkey) Mertcan Kenaryol
- 61 (Turkey) Ömür Pehlivan

=== Technical staff ===
- Head coach: (Turkey) İlknur Kurtuluş
- Assistant coach: (Turkey) Oğuz Okta
- Goalkeeping coach: (Turkey) Erdal Kaynak
- Fitness coach: (Turkey) Erdem Küçük
- Physiotherapist: (Bulgaria) Emrah Vatansever
- Masseur: (Turkey) İbrahim Esen

=== Transfers ===
Transfers for the 2026–27 season

Joining

Leaving

=== Transfer history ===
Transfers for the 2025–26 season

Joining

- (Iran) Reza Yadegari (LB) from (Hungary) QHB-Eger
- (Bosnia and Herzegovina) Vladan Djurdjević (RW) from (Bosnia and Herzegovina) RK Borac Banja Luka
- (Bosnia and Herzegovina) Dean Šešić (RB) from (Hungary) Dabas KK
- (Brazil) Gabriel Rosa (CB) from (Brazil) Handebol Clube Taubaté
- (Turkey) Onur Ersin (CB) from (Turkey) Beykoz Belediyespor
- (Turkey) Tolga Özbahar (LP) from (Turkey) Depsaş Enerji SK

Leaving

- (Turkey) Görkem Biçer (RW) to (Turkey) Spor Toto SK

== Accomplishments ==
- Turkish Super League:
  - Silver (1): 2025
  - Bronze (2): 2013, 2015
- Turkish Handball Cup:
  - Silver (4): 2008, 2012, 2014, 2015
- Turkish Handball Super Cup:
  - Gold (1): 2025
  - Silver (1): 2012

== EHF ranking ==
As of 23/02/2026

Rank	Team	Points
101	(Croatia) RK Poreč	48
102	(Spain) BM Logroño La Rioja	47
103	(Lithuania) VHC Šviesa	47
104	(Turkey) Nilüfer Belediyespor	47
105	(Luxembourg) HB Dudelange	47
106	(France) Chambéry Savoie	46
107	(Luxembourg) Handball Club Berchem	46

== Former club members ==
=== Notable former players ===
Criteria

To appear in this section a player must have either:

- Played at least one official international match for their national team at any time.
- Or spent at least 10 years with the team.

==== Goalkeepers ====
- (Turkey) Kayhan Akat (2014–2017)
- (Turkey) Hüseyin Bereket (2019–2023, 2024–)
- (Turkey) Mehmet Emre (2024–)

==== Right wingers ====
- (Turkey) Görkem Biçer (2024–2025)
- (Turkey) Çetin Çelik (2012–2016)
- (Turkey) Doğukan Keser (2023–2024)
- (Turkey) Durmuş Mutlu
- (Bosnia and Herzegovina) Vladan Djurdjević (2025–)

==== Left wingers ====
- (Turkey) Gökay Bilim (2024–)
- (Portugal) Sérgio Barros (2017–2018)
- (Serbia) Jožef Holpert (2015–2016)

==== Line players ====
- (Turkey) Ugur Erceylan (2020–2021)
- (Turkey) Tolga Özbahar (2025–)
- (Turkey) Çağlayan Öztürk (2008–2017, 2024–)
- (Turkey) Atila Zaman (2019–2024)

==== Left backs ====
- (Turkey) Fatih Çalkamis (2021–2023)
- (Turkey) Genco Ilanç (2024–)
- (Iran) Reza Yadegari (2025–)

==== Central backs ====
- (Turkey) Onur Ersin (2025–)
- (Turkey) Enes Gümüşok (2019–2022)
- (Turkey) Ramazan Mutlu (2012–2021, 2022–)

==== Right backs ====
- (Turkey) Ömer Ozan Arifoğlu (2017–2019)
- (Turkey) Ömür Pehlivan (2015–2021, 2024–)
- (Turkey) Özgür Sarak (2022–2023)

== International competitions ==
=== EHF European Cup ===
Season	Round	Opponent	1st leg	2nd leg	Aggregate
2025–26	Round 2	(Iceland) Fimleikafélag Hafnarfjarðar	31–23	29–34	60–57
2025–26	Round 3	(Luxembourg) Red Boys Differdange	35–29	34–34	69–63
2025–26	Last 16	(Czech Republic) SKKP Handball Brno	26–29	32–28	58–57
2025–26	Quarter-finals	(Hungary) MOL Tatabánya KC	31–31	35–37	36–38
2026–27	Round 2	(Norway) Runar Sandefjord	28–37	29–36	57–73
