= Üçevler Sports Facility =

Multi-purpose indoor sports venue in Bursa, Turkey

Üçevler Sports Facility Üçevler Spor Tesisleri
- Interactive map of Üçevler Sports Facility; Üçevler Spor Tesisleri
- Location: Üçevler Neighborhood, Nilüfer, Bursa, Turkey
- Coordinates: 40.198125°N 28.937781°E
- Owner: Nilüfer Municipality
- Operator: Nilüfer Municipality
- Capacity: 380

Construction
- Opened: 2019; 7 years ago

Tenants
- Bursa Büyükşehir BSK women's handball Nilüfer BSK men's handball

Üçevler Sports Facility (Turkish: Üçevler Spor Tesisleri), also known as Nilüfer Belediyesi Spor Tesisleri, is a multi-purpose sports venue. It is named after its location at Üçevler Neighborhood in Nilüfer, Bursa, Turkey. Established in 2019 with open-air courts, it was expanded later with an indoor-arena building.

== Overview ==
The Üçevler Sports Facility is located at Ahıska Cad. 46 in Üçevler Neighborhood of Nilüfer, Bursa, western Turkey. It was established in 2019 with open-air courts. The construction project for the expansion of the facility with an indoor-arena building, carried out by Ram Construction Co., started on 26 October 2022. It was built by the Nilüfer Belediyesi (Nilüfer Municipality) on an area of 18,000 m^{2} (190,000 sq ft). Owned and run by the Municipality, the facility features a handball court with a seating capacity of 380, which can be used also for basketball and volleyball competitions, a volleyball hall for training purposes, a beach volleyball court, a grass and an artificial turf field. The main building of the facility includes administrative offices, 27 accommodation rooms, recreation and meeting rooms for athletes and a cafeteria.

The arena is home to the Bursa Büyükşehir BSK women's handball team in the Turkish Women's Handball Super League, and the Nilüfer BSK men's handball team in the Turkish Men's Handball Super League.

== International competitions hosted ==
The local municipality organizes Nilüfer International Sports Festival in several sports branches for the youth each year in the district, where the facility is also a venue.

The women's handball team Bursa Büyükşehir BSK played their home matches at the 2025–26 Women's EHF European Cop, as well as the men's handball team|Nilüfer BSK]] their hpm matches at the 2025–26 EHF European Cup in the arena.
