= Spor Toto SK =

Turkish sports club

- Formation: 25 July 2019; 7 years ago
- Purpose: Sport: cycling, fencing, handball, volleyball, under-water sports
- Location: Altındağ, Ankara, Turkey
- Coordinates: 39.957138°N 32.870731°E
- Members: Turkish Handball Federation
- Formerly called: Maliye GSK (1995-2008); Maliye Milli Piyango SK (2008-2019)

Spor Toto SK (Turkish: Spor Toto Spor Kulübü) is a Turkish multi-sport club sponsored by the Turkish state-owned lottery game organization, Spor Toto. It was established in Ankara, Turkey in 1995.

== Overview ==
The Spor Toto SK was foundedin Ankara on 25 July 2019 with the transfer of the club Maliye Milli Piyango SK to the Spor Toto Organization. The club is located at Örnek Mah., Faik Suat Cad. 3 in Altındağ, Ankara, Turkey. Spor Toto SK maintains teams in cycling, fencing, handball, volleyball, and under water sports. Club colors are red, black and white.
