= Romas Kirveliavičius =

Austrian handball player (born 1988)

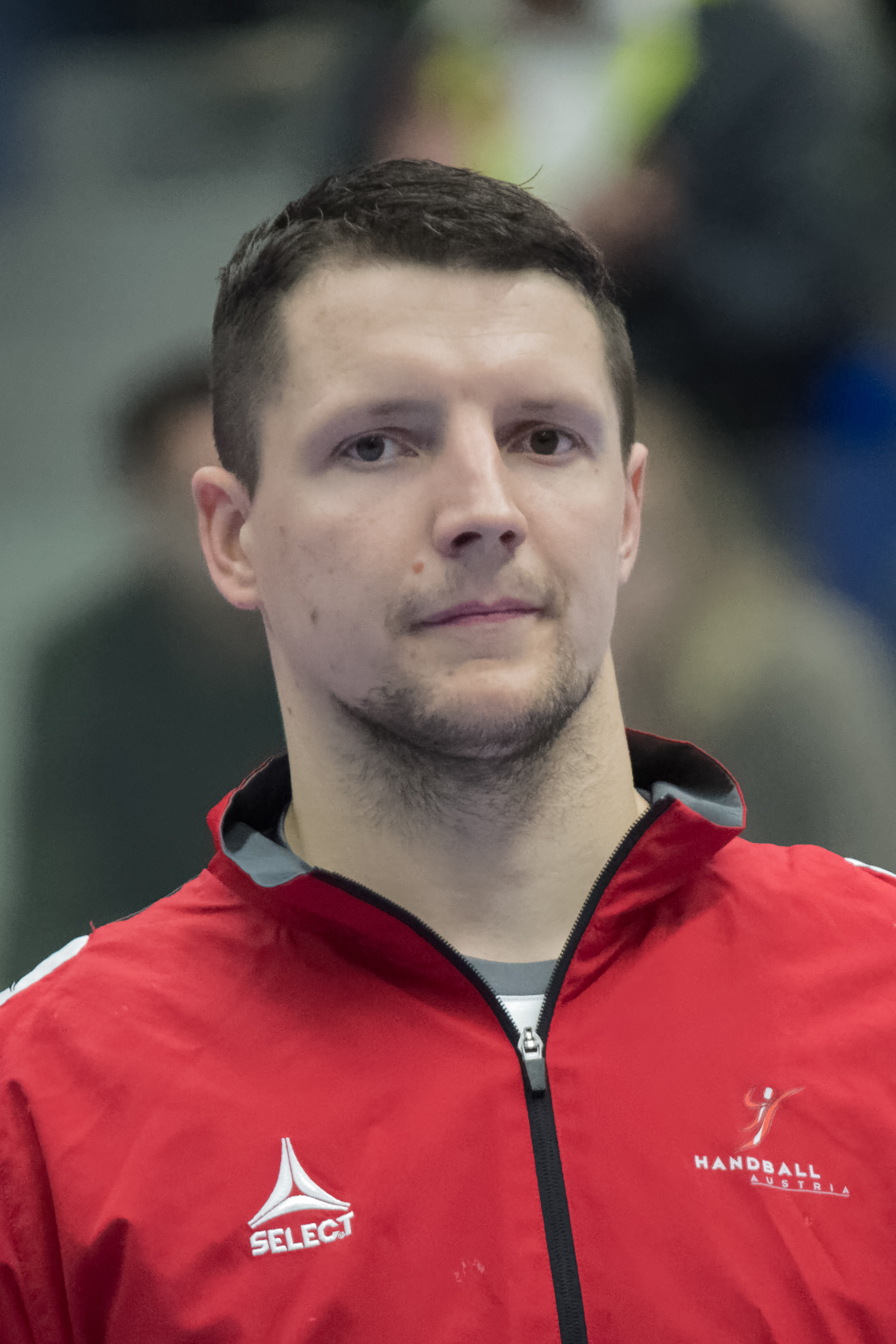

Personal information
- Nationality: Lithuanian; Austrian
- Born: 5 March 1988 (age 38) Druskininkai, Lithuania
- Height: 2.00 m (6 ft 7 in)

Sport
- Sport: Handball
- Position: Left back
- Current club: Jags Vöslau
- Number: 5

Senior clubs
- Years: Team
- –2008: HC Vilnius
- 2008–2014: Handballclub Fivers Margareten
- 2014–2015: SG BBM Bietigheim
- 2015–2018: HSC 2000 Coburg
- 2018–2021: HBW Balingen-Weilstetten
- 2021–2023: Union Handballklub Krems
- 2023–: Jags Vöslau
National team
Years	Team	Apps	(Gls)
2014–	Austria	46	(37)
- Updated on 8 August 2021

Romas Kirveliavičius (born 5 March 1988) is a Lithuanian-born Austrian handball player for Austrian club Jags Vöslau and the Austrian national team. He obtained Austrian citizenship in 2014.
