= İlknur Akdoğan =

Turkish windsurfer (born 1969)

Personal information
- Nationality: Turkey
- Born: 2 August 1969 (age 57)
- Height: 1.70 m (5 ft 7 in)
- Weight: 58 kg (128 lb)

Sport
- Sport: Windsurfing

İlknur Akdoğan (born 2 August 1969) is a Turkish windsurfer. She competed in the 2000 Summer Olympics where she placed 28th.
