= Göztepe S.K. (men's handball) =

Professional Turkish handball team

Göztepe S.K. Men's Handball
- Full name: Göztepe Spor Kulübü Erkek Hentbol Takımı
- Founded: June 14, 2002; 24 years ago
- Arena: Celal Atik Spor Salonu
- Capacity: 1,700
- President: Mehmet Sepil
- Head coach: Remzi Ferudun Dorak
- League: Turkish Handball First League
- 2020–21: Turkish Handball Super League, 10th
- Club colours

Göztepe S.K. Men's Handball (Turkish: Göztepe Spor Kulübü Erkek Hentbol Takımı) is a Turkish professional men's handball team of the same named multi-sports club from İzmir. The team plays their home matches at Celal Atik Sports Hall.

== European record ==
Season	Competition	Round	Club	1st leg	2nd leg	Aggregate
2016–17	Challenge Cup	R3	(Netherlands) JMS Hurry-Up	22–20	25–28	47–48
2017–18	Challenge Cup	R3	(Greece) PAOK	35–26	28–29	63–55
2017–18	Challenge Cup	R4	(Greece) AEK Athens	29–25	23–32	52–57
2018–19	Challenge Cup	R3	(Norway) ØIF Arendal	25–40	28–28	53–68

== Current squad ==
Squad for the 2016–17 season

Goalkeepers

- 0 (Iran) Mohsen Babasafari Renani
- 85 (Belarus) Aliaksandr Markelau
- 99 (Turkey) Alp Yildiz

Right Wingers

- 21 (Turkey) Nevzat Kerem Direk
- 5 (Turkey) Murat Enc

Left Wingers

- 3 (Turkey) Enis Harun Hacioglu
- 2 (Serbia) Aleksandar Pilipovic
- 42 (Turkey) Kürsat Alim Us

Line players

- 4 (Turkey) Cenk Köker
- 8 (Turkey) Erdogan Sürer
- 23 (Serbia) Nemanja Vucicevic

Left Backs

- 19 (Turkey) Baran Nalbantoglu
- 43 (Turkey) Burakcan Öztürk

Central Backs

- 7 (Belarus) Evgeny Semenov
- 53 (Turkey) Yakup Yasar Simsar

Right Backs

- 11 (Serbia) Milos Lojanicic
- 17 (Turkey) Gökhan Örnek

== See also ==
- Göztepe Women's Handball
