= Jags Vöslau =

Austrian handball club

roomz JAGS Vöslau
- Full name: roomz JAGS Vöslau
- Short name: JAGS
- Founded: 1945; 81 years ago
- Arena: Thermenhalle Bad Vöslau, Bad Vöslau
- Capacity: 700
- President: Thomas Schartel
- Head coach: Sebastian Salvat Sanchez
- League: HLA Meisterliga
- 2025-26: 1st
- Club colours
Home	Away

Jags Vöslau is a handball club from Bad Vöslau, Austria. They currently compete in the HLA Meisterliga.

The current name of the club is roomz JAGS Vöslau due to sponsorship reasons.

Location of Jags Vöslau

== History ==
The team was founded in 1945 under the name Vöslauer HC. In the 2013/14 season, the club was promoted to the second division, the HLA Challenge League. In 2020 the club changed their name to Jags Vöslau. In the 2020/21 season, they were promoted to the top division, the HLA Meisterliga, after finishing 2nd in the HLA Challenge League. In 2024/25, the team reached the final of the ÖHB Cup, but lost by one goal to Handball Tirol. The club participated in an international cup for the first time in the 2025/26 season: the EHF European Cup. They reached the 2nd round, where they were knocked out by Slovenian RK Trimo Trebnje. In the same season, they won their first ever Austrian Championship.

== Management ==
Position	Name
President	(Austria) Thomas Schartel
Vice President	(Austria) Werner Kosa
Vice President	(Austria) Ralph Perischa
Vice President	(Austria) Holger Wernicke

== Team ==
=== Current squad ===
Squad for the 2025–26 season

Jags Vöslau

Goalkeepers

- 1 (Austria) Thomas Bauer
- 16 (Austria) Lucas Binder
- 42 (Austria) Boris Ilov
- 61 (Austria) Florian Kaiper

Left Wingers

- 10 (Austria) Julian Riedner
- 53 (Hungary) Dominik Dömötör
- 68 (Austria) Fabian Schartel

Right Wingers

- 4 (Spain) Roger Giner
- 15 (Austria) Florian Fritz
- 23 (Austria) Christoph Barta
- 75 (Austria) Marijan Rojnica

Line Players

- 55 (Portugal) Eduardo Mendonça
- 84 (Germany) Jonas Dell

Left Backs

- 59 (Austria) John Baxter
- 66 (Austria) Moritz Doblhoff-Dier
- 77 (France) Victor Pelechenko
- 95 (Austria) (Lithuania) Romas Kirveliavičius

Central Backs

- 5 (Austria) Lukas Nikolic
- 9 (Brazil) Leonardo Abrahão
- 34 (Austria) Moritz Bachmann
- 41 (Croatia) Jan Kovačec

Right Backs

- 11 (Austria) Raphael Muck
- 14 (Austria) Emil Scheicher
- 17 (Croatia) Mateo Dika

=== Technical staff ===
- Head Coach: (Spain) Sebastian Salvat Sanchez
- Coach: (Austria) Roland Eberl
- Coach: (Israel) Moshe Halperin
- Physiotherapist: (Austria) Katja Puhm
- Physiotherapist: (Austria) Benjamin Rotheneder
- Physiotherapist: (Austria) Nino Tatzgern

=== Transfers ===
Transfers for the 2026–27 season

Joining

- (Greece) Chrysanthos Tsanaxidis (LP) from (Greece) Olympiacos
- (Spain) Joan Amigó Boada (LB) from (Turkey) Beşiktaş JK

Leaving

- (Croatia) Jan Kovačec (CB) to (Greece) AEK Athens
- (Austria) (Lithuania) Romas Kirveliavičius (LB) (retires)
- (Austria) Christoph Barta (RW) to (Austria) UHK Krems

=== Transfer History ===
Transfers for the 2025–26 season

Joining

- (Brazil) Leonardo Abrahão (CB) from (Spain) BM Granollers
- (Spain) Roger Giner (RW) from (Spain) FC Barcelona
- (Austria) Florian Kaiper (GK) from (Austria) HC Linz AG
- (Austria) Moritz Bachmann (CB) from (Austria) HC Linz AG
- (Austria) John Baxter (LB) from (Austria) WAT Fünfhaus

Leaving

- (Germany) Ole-Gunnar Steinhagen (LB) from (Austria) Perchtoldsdorf Devils

== Accomplishments ==
- Austrian Cup (ÖHB-Cup)
  - Silver: 2025
- Handball Liga Austria
  - Winner (1) : 2026

== EHF ranking ==
As of 23/10/2025

Rank	Team	Points
179	(Germany) ThSV Eisenach	16
180	(Austria) HC Linz AG	16
181	(Romania) CSM Constanța	16
182	(Austria) Jags Vöslau	16
183	(Hungary) Csurgói KK	15
184	(Slovenia) RD Ribnica	14
185	(Spain) BM Benidorm	14

== Former club members ==
=== Notable former players ===
The list includes players who have played at least once for their national team or spent at least 10 years with the team.

==== Goalkeepers ====
- (Austria) Thomas Bauer (1996–2003, 2023–)
- (Austria) Florian Kaiper (2025–)

==== Left backs ====
- (Austria) (Lithuania) Romas Kirveliavičius (2023–)

==== Central backs ====
- (Brazil) Leonardo Abrahão (2025–)
- (Lithuania) Augustas Strazdas (2017–2019)

==== Right backs ====
- (Austria) (Poland) Martin Abadir (2013–2015)

=== Former coaches ===
Seasons	Coach	Country
2021–2022	Jan-Niklas Richter	(Germany)
2022–2024	Spyros Balomenos	(Greece)
2024–	Sebastian Salvat Sanchez	(Spain)
