= Red Boys Differdange (handball) =

Luxembourgish handball club

- Founded: 1939
- Arena: Avenue Parc des Sports à Oberkorn, Differdange
- President: /
- League: Axa League Luxembourg
- 2024-25: 1st
Home	Away

Red Boys Differdange is a Luxembourgish professional handball team. They have won the Luxembourgish Championship 9 times.

== European record ==
Season	Competition	Round	Club	1st leg	2nd leg	Aggregate
1990–91	European Cup	Round 1	(Portugal) Benfica	28–26	18–28	46–54
1991–92	European Cup	Round 1	(Israel) Hapoel Rishon LeZion	16–29	21–24	37–53
1994–95	EHF Cup	1/16	(Turkey) ASKI Ankara	23–31	21–18	44–49
1995–96	EHF Cup	1/16	(Austria) REMUS Bärnbach–Köflach	22–22	21–21	43–43
1995–96	EHF Cup	1/8	(Croatia) Zadar Gortan	19–31	26–33	45–64
1996–97	City Cup	1/16	(Bosnia and Herzegovina) RK "Borac" Travnik	29–26	30–20	59–46
1996–97	City Cup	1/8	(Denmark) Kolding IF	20–30	17–26	37–56
1997–98	EHF Champions League	1/16	(Switzerland) Pfadi Winterthur	20–32	27–35	47–67
1998–99	EHF Champions League	1/16	(Norway) Viking HK Stavanger	26–40	20–40	46–80
1999–00	EHF Champions League	1/16	(Norway) Sandefjord TIF	24–34	15–43	39–77
2000–01	EHF Cup	R1	(Estonia) HC Kehra	25–30	24–18	49–48
2000–01	EHF Cup	R2	(Norway) Bodø HK	19–34	15–29	34–63
2004–05	Challenge Cup	R3	(Georgia (country)) HC Kutaisi	39–19		
2004–05	Challenge Cup	QF	(Romania) Minaur Baia Mare	27–42	25–41	52–83
2014–15	Challenge Cup	R3	(Turkey) Ankara İl Özel İdare	33–17	48–28	81–45
2014–15	Challenge Cup	Last 16	(Romania) Odorheiu Secuiesc	20–33	16–30	36–63
2016–17	EHF Champions League	QR	(Slovakia) HT Tatran Prešov	28–32		4th place
2016–17	EHF Champions League	QR	(Finland) Riihimäki Cocks	21–30		4th place
2016–17	EHF Cup	R2	(Israel) Maccabi Rishon LeZion	25–26	24–30	49–56
2017–18	Challenge Cup	R2	(Lithuania) Kauno Azuolas-KTU Kaunas	32–26	25–26	57–52
2017–18	Challenge Cup	R3	(Bulgaria) HC Dobrudja	43–23	36–26	79–49
2017–18	Challenge Cup	Last 16	(Russia) Dynamo-Victor	26–31	26–28	52–59
2019–20	Challenge Cup	R3	(Czech Republic) TJ Sokol Nové Veselí	22–21	27–25	49–46
2019–20	Challenge Cup	Last 16	(Czech Republic) HC Dukla Prague	24–37	32–29	56–66
2022–23	EHF European Cup	R2	(Lithuania) Vilnius VHC Šviesa	34–22	31–28	65–50
2022–23	EHF European Cup	R3	(Cyprus) Sabbianco A. Famagusta	20–23	26–25	46–48
2023–24	EHF European Cup	R2	(Iceland) IBV Vestmannaeyja	30–34	34–35	64–69
2025–26	EHF European Cup	R2	(Kosovo) KH Kastrioti	31–28	29–26	60–54
2025–26	EHF European Cup	R3	(Turkey) Nilüfer Belediyespor	34–34	29–35	63–69
2026–27	EHF European Cup	R2	(Slovenia) RK Gorenje Velenje	31–29	21–32	52–61
