= Spor Toto SK (men's handball) =

Turkish professional handball team

- Full name: Spor Toto Spor Kulübü
- Founded: 2019; 7 years ago
- Arena: THF Sport Hall
- Head coach: (Turkey) Serdar Seymen
- League: Turkish Men's Handball Super League
- Club colours

Spor Toto SK Handball is the professional men's handball team of the Ankara-based Turkish sports club Spor Toto SK. They play in the Turkish Men's Handball Super League.

== History ==
The Spor Toto men's handball team was renamed from the Maliye Piyango men's handball team when the club was transferred to Spor Toto Organization in the summer of 2019. The team is based at Büyükesat Mah., Koza Cad. 34 in Çankaya Ankara.

The team finished the 2020–21 Turkish Men's Handball Super League season as champion.

== Colors ==
The club colors are red, black and whşte.

== Arena ==
The team play their home matches in the THF Sport Hall in Ankara.

== Current squad ==
As of 2025–26 season.

Head coach: (Turkey) Serdar Seymen

- 3 LW (Turkey) Alp Eren Pektaş
- 5 LB (Turkey) Sarp Seyman
- 7 RB (Turkey) Özgür Sarak
- 10 LP (Turkey) İbrahim Üçdağ
- 12 GK (Turkey) Muhammed Yusuf Karaca
- 14 LP (Turkey) Mehmet Demirezen
- 16 GK (Turkey) Coşkun Göktepe
- 18 GK (Turkey) Ozan Erdoğan
- 20 CB (Turkey) Emre Keskin
- 25 LP (Bosnia and Herzegovina) Amir Muhovic
- 26 GK (Turkey) Yunus Özmusul
- 44 LB (Slovenia) Tobias Cvetko
- 71 RW (Turkey) Mevlüt Kaan Günay
- 77 LW (Turkey) Bayram Kasırga

== International competitions ==
=== EHF European League ===
Season	Round	Opponent	1st leg	2nd leg	Aggregate
2021–22	1st qly round	(Germany) Rhein-Neckar Löwen	22–38	22–42	44–60

=== EHF European Cup ===
Season	Round	Opponent	1st leg	2nd leg	Aggregate
2022–23	Round 1	(Luxembourg) HB Dudelange	25–26	27–24	52–50
2022–23	Round 2	(Finland) Bollklubben-46	20–37	23–43	43–80
2023–24	Round 1	(Finland) HIFK Handboll	29–28	36–29	65–57
2023–24	Round 2	(Montenegro) RK Budućnost Podgorica	31–24	23–17	54–41
2023–24	Round 3	(Bosnia and Herzegovina) RK Sloboda	25–34	28–27	53–61
2024–25	Round 1	(Croatia) RK Poreč	26–32	26–29	52–61
2025–26	Round 1	(Italy) Raimond Sassari	32–36	38–42	70–78
2026–27	Round 1	(Bosnia and Herzegovina) RK Vogošća	40–22	37–21	77–43
2026–27	Round 2	(North Macedonia) GRK Ohrid	24–36	22–38	46–74

== Honours ==
Turkish Men's Handball Super League
Champions (1): 2020–21.
