= Estonian Handball Association =

Sports governing body in Estonia

Estonian Handball Association (abbreviation EHA; Estonian: Eesti Käsipalliliit) is one of the sport governing bodies in Estonia which deals with handball.

EHF is established on 24 November 1990 in Tallinn. EHF is a successor of Estonian SSR Handball Federation (Estonian: Eesti NSV Väravpalliföderatsioon).

EHF is a member of International Handball Federation (IHF) since 1991.
