= Macedonian Handball Federation =

National governing body of handball in North Macedonia

Macedonian Handball Federation Ракометна Федерација на Македонија
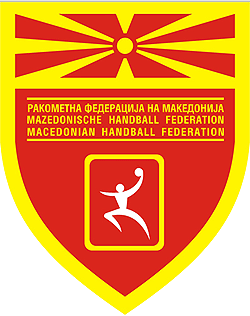
- Formation: 1949
- Type: National sport federation
- Headquarters: Skopje, North Macedonia
- Members: EHF, IHF
- Official language: Macedonian
- President: Aleksandar Stefanov
- Secretary General: Vlatko Tasevski
- Website: macedoniahandball.com.mk

The Macedonian Handball Federation (Macedonian: Ракометна федерација на Македонија;) commonly known by its acronym, RFM, is the national governing body of handball in North Macedonia. Its headquarters are in Skopje and it reestablish its membership as a single Republic of the EHF and IHF in 1993. Macedonian Handball Federation is responsible for the organization and governance of handball's major local championships in the country and also runs the Macedonian Men's and Women's national teams.

It organizes the following leagues:

- Men's VIP Super league
- Women's Skopsko Super league
- "I league"
- Mladinska liga
- WINNER Kadetska liga
- SPARKASSE Pionerska liga

== International events organised by the Macedonian Handball Federation ==
In 2008 the Macedonian Handball Federation organised the European Women's Handball Championship. The Macedonian Handball Federation was host of:

- Women's Junior Handball World Championship - 2003
- Men's Junior Handball Championship - 2007
- Women's Junior Handball Championship - 2008
- 2008 European Women's Handball Championship
- Women's Youth World Handball Championship - 2014
- European Women's U-17 Handball Championship - 2015
- 2022 European Women's Handball Championship
