= Parnassos Strovolou =

Cypriot sports club

- Founded: 1957; 68 years ago

Parnassos Strovolou is a Cypriot sports club based in Strovolos, located in the Nicosia District. It has Badminton, Handball and Tennis team. Previous it had Association football and Futsal team. The association football team had 2 participations in Cypriot Fourth Division.

== Honours ==
Futsal

- Cypriot Futsal First Division:
  - Winner (2): 2005–06, 2007–08
- Cypriot Futsal Cup:
  - Winner (1): 2006
- Cyprus Futsal League Cup:
  - Winner (1): 2006
