= Handball Federation of the Faroe Islands =

Governing body of handball in the Faroe Islands

Handball Federation of the Faroe Islands Faroese: Hondbóltssamband Føroya HSF
- IOC nation: Faroe Islands (FRO)
- Sport: Handball
- Other sports: Beach handball
- Official website: www.hsf.fo

HISTORY
- Year of formation: 1980; 46 years ago

AFFILIATIONS
- International federation: International Handball Federation (IHF)
- IHF member since: 1974
- Continental association: European Handball Federation
- National Olympic Committee: Faroese Confederation of Sports & Olympic Committee

GOVERNING BODY
- President: Mrs. Gunn Ellefsen

HEADQUARTERS
- Address: Gundadalur 2 P.O. Box 1023, 110 Tórshavn
- Country: Faroe Islands
- Secretary General: Ari Rouch

The Handball Federation of the Faroe Islands (Faroese: Hondbóltssamband Føroya) (HSF) is the administrative and controlling body for handball and beach handball in Faroe Islands. Founded in 1980, HSF is a member of European Handball Federation (EHF) and the International Handball Federation (IHF).

== National teams ==
- Faroe Islands men's national handball team
- Faroe Islands men's national junior handball team
- Faroe Islands men's national youth handball team
- Faroe Islands women's national handball team
