= Turkey Handball Federation =

Governing body of handball in Turkey

Turkish Handball Federation
- Abbreviation: THF
- Formation: February 4, 1976; 50 years ago
- Type: Government organisation
- Headquarters: Çankaya
- Location: Ankara, Turkey
- Region served: Turkey
- Official language: Turkish
- President: Mesut Çebi
- Parent organization: GSGM
- Website: www.thf.org.tr

Turkish Handball Federation (Turkish: Türkiye Hentbol Federasyonu) is the governing body of handball and beach handball sports in Turkey. It was formed on February 4, 1976. The headquarters is located in Çankaya district of Ankara. It is a member of the European Handball Federation (EHF).

It organizes leagues, tournaments and championships for all age groups of both genders at national level. In addition, support services like the education of referees and coaches are within its duties. Participations of Turkish handball teams at all international competition events are organized by the federation.

== History ==
Handball began in Turkey in the period 1927-1938 as an outdoor sport, initiated by three Turkish instructors for physical education at military schools, who were trained in Germany. The first official rules for field handball were published in 1934 by the "Turkey Physical Training Association" (Turkish: Türkiye İdman Cemiyeti), and the first official open-air field handball match was played in 1938.

In 1942, handball, volleyball and basketball were organized unter the "Sport Games Federation" (Turkish: Spor Oyunları Federasyonu) that led to a fast-growing development. The first field handball league was formed in the 1942-43 season in Istanbul. In 1945, the first Turkish championship was organized.

From 1945 on, indoor handball matches were held for girls in schools. From 1960 to 1962, the first referee courses took place. Serious efforts relating to indoor handball date from the mid-1970s. At that time, instructors of physical education, who were sent to West Germany for further education, founded the modern indoor handball sport in Turkish schools following their return. In 1975, official indoor handball rules were translated and published by Yaşar Sevim of the Sports Academy of Ankara.

On February 4, 1976, Turkey Handball Federation was established. Yaşar Sevim was appointed its first president, who had received further education for four years at the Sports Academy in Cologne, Germany.

== See also ==
- Turkish Handball Super League
- Turkish Women's Handball Super League
- Turkey men's national handball team
- Turkey women's national handball team
- Turkey national beach handball team
- Turkey women's national beach handball team
- THF Sport Hall, Çankaya, Ankara
- THF Serdar Seymen Handball Hall, Beykoz, Istanbul
