= Turkish Men's Handball Super League =

- Current season, competition or edition: 2026–27 Turkish Men's Handball Super League
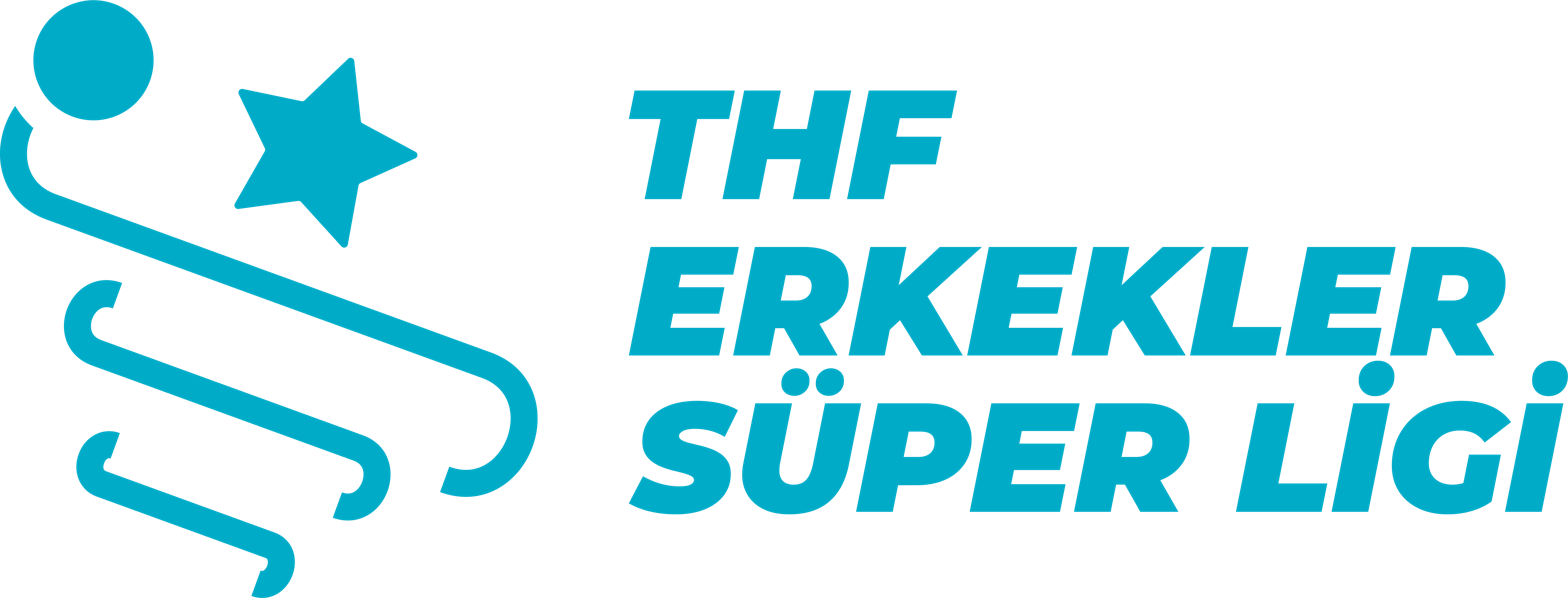
- Sport: Handball
- Founded: 1982; 44 years ago
- Organizing body: Turkey Handball Federation
- No. of teams: 10
- Country: Turkey
- Most recent champion: Beşiktaş (2025-26)
- Most titles: Beşiktaş (19 titles)
- International cups: EHF European League; EHF European Cup
- Website: www.thf.gov.tr

Turkish Men's Handball Super League (Turkish: Türkiye Erkekler Hentbol Süper Ligi) is the highest league in the Turkish handball and comprises the top 13 elite men teams. The league began in 1982–83.

== Structure ==
The season starts in the end of September with a regular season with 13 teams meeting each other twice. The four best teams after the regular season qualify for the play-off. After 1–4 and 2–3 clashes, the winners go to the league final.

== Turkish Handball Super League past champions ==
- 1979 : MTA SK Ankara
- 1980 : MTA SK Ankara (2)
- 1981 : Beşiktaş
- 1982 : Beşiktaş (2)
- 1983 : İstanbul Bankası Yenişehir
- 1984 : İstanbul Bankası Yenişehir (2)
- 1985 : Hortaş Yenişehir (3)
- 1986 : Tarsus Erkutspor
- 1987 : Halkbank
- 1988 : Halkbank (2)
- 1989 : Arçelik SK Istanbul
- 1990 : Polisgücü Eskisehir
- 1991 : Polisgücü Eskisehir (2)
- 1992 : Halkbank (3)
- 1993 : Polisgücü Eskisehir (3)
- 1994 : Halkbank (4)
- 1995 : Çankaya Belediye SK
- 1996 : Çankaya Belediye SK (2)
- 1997 : Çankaya Belediye SK (3)
- 1998 : ASKİ SK
- 1999 : Çankaya Belediye SK (4)
- 2000 : ASKİ SK (2)
- 2001 : ASKİ SK (3)
- 2002 : ASKİ SK (4)
- 2003 : ASKİ SK (5)
- 2004 : ASKİ SK (6)
- 2005 : Beşiktaş (3)
- 2006 : Spor Toto SK
- 2007 : Beşiktaş (4)
- 2008 : İzmir BŞB
- 2009 : Beşiktaş (5)
- 2010 : Beşiktaş (6)
- 2011 : Beşiktaş (7)
- 2012 : Beşiktaş (8)
- 2013 : Beşiktaş (9)
- 2014 : Beşiktaş (10)
- 2015 : Beşiktaş (11)
- 2016 : Beşiktaş (12)
- 2017 : Beşiktaş (13)
- 2018 : Beşiktaş (14)
- 2019 : Beşiktaş (15)
- 2020 : Cancelled due to COVID-19 pandemic
- 2021 : Spor Toto SK (2)
- 2022 : Beşiktaş (16)
- 2023 : Beykoz Belediye SK
- 2024 : Beşiktaş (17)
- 2025 : Beşiktaş (18)
- 2026 : Beşiktaş (19)

	Club	Titles	Year
1.	Beşiktaş	19	1981, 1982, 2005, 2007, 2009, 2010, 2011, 2012, 2013, 2014, 2015, 2016, 2017, 2018, 2019, 2022, 2024, 2025, 2026
2.	ASKI SK Ankara	6	1998, 2000, 2001, 2002, 2003, 2004
3.	Ankara Halkbank SK	4	1987, 1988, 1992, 1994
	Cankaya BGSK	4	1995, 1996, 1997, 1999
5.	İstanbul Bankası Yenişehir	3	1983, 1984, 1985
	Polisgücü Eskisehir	3	1990, 1991, 1993
7.	MTA SK Ankara	2	1979, 1980
	Maliye Milli Piyango SK	2	2006, 2021
9.	Tarsus Idman Yurdu Erkutspor	1	1986
	Arçelik SK Istanbul	1	1989
	İzmir BŞB	1	2008
	Beykoz Belediye SK	1	2023

== See also ==
- Turkish Women's Handball Super League
