= Beşiktaş JK (handball) =

Turkish professional handball team

Beşiktaş Jimnastik Kulübü
- Full name: Beşiktaş Jimnastik Kulübü
- Nickname(s): Kara Kartallar (The Black Eagles)
- Founded: Athletic Association: 1903; Handball Club: 1978
- Arena: Süleyman Seba Sport Complex; Istanbul, Turkey
- Capacity: 1500
- President: Ahmet Nur Çebi
- Head coach: Rubén Garabaya
- League: Turkish Handball Super League; EHF Champions League
- Club colours

Beşiktaş Handball Team is the professional handball team of Beşiktaş J.K., which is a Turkish sports club from Istanbul. The club plays their home matches at the Süleyman Seba Sport Complex.

== Kits ==
HOME
2010–11	2015–16

AWAY
2010–11	2016–17	2017–18	2020–21

== Current squad ==
Squad for the 2022-23 season

Goalkeepers

- 1 (Turkey) ÖKSÜZCÜK, YAGIZ
- 12 (Turkey) YATKIN, ENIS
- 87 (Turkey) CAPAR, OGUZHAN

Players

- 2 (Turkey) HACIOGLU, ENIS HARUN
- 7 (Serbia) NIKOLA ARSENIĆ
- 8 (Turkey) AKYOL, NEVZAT SERKAN
- 10 (Turkey) ARIFOGLU, ÖMER OZAN
- 11 (Turkey) ILANÇ, GENCO
- 13 (Turkey) SIMSAR, YAKUP YASAR
- 17 (Turkey) ERDOGAN, OZAN
- 18 (Algeria) KAABACHE, HICHEM
- 19 (Turkey) NALBANTOGLU, BARAN
- 22 (Turkey) YILDIZ, EYUP ARDA
- 23 (Turkey) KESER, DOGUKAN
- 24 (Turkey) KESKIN, EMRE
- 35 (Turkey) YAGMUROGLU, SEVKET
- 38 (Turkey) KARADURMUS, MEHMET ALI
- 77 (Turkey) BILIM, GÖKAY

=== Transfers ===
Transfers for the 2026–27 season

Joining

- (Serbia) Bogdan Radivojević (RW) from (North Macedonia) RK Eurofarm Pelister
- (Serbia) Uroš Pavlović (LP) from (France) US Créteil Handball
- (Chile) Erwin Feuchtmann (LB) from (France) Fenix Toulouse Handball
- (Portugal) Miguel Espinha Ferreira (GK) from (North Macedonia) RK Vardar
- (Spain) Ismael El-Korchi (CB) from (Portugal) S.L. Benfica

Leaving

- (Spain) Eduardo Gurbindo (RB) to (Spain) Helvetia Anaitasuna
- (Spain) Joan Amigó Boada (LB) to (Austria) Jags Vöslau
- (Croatia) Matej Ašanin (GK) to (Spain) Ángel Ximénez Puente Genil

=== Transfer History ===
Transfers for the 2025–26 season

Joining

- (Turkey) (Germany) Koray Ayar (LP) from (Germany) TSV Hannover-Burgdorf

Leaving

- (Egypt) Khaled Walid (LP) to (North Macedonia) RK Eurofarm Pelister
- (Slovenia) Tobias Cvetko (LB) to (Turkey) Spor Toto SK

== Honors ==
=== Domestic ===
- Turkish Super League :
  - Winners (19 — Record): 1980, 1981, 2005, 2007, 2009, 2010, 2011, 2012, 2013, 2014, 2015, 2016, 2017, 2018, 2019, 2022, 2024, 2025, 2026
  - Runners (2): 1996, 2006
  - Third Place (6): 1997, 1998, 1999, 2000, 2001, 2008
- Turkish Cup :
  - Winners (17 - Record): 1999, 2001, 2005, 2006, 2009, 2010, 2011, 2012, 2014, 2015, 2016, 2017, 2018, 2019, 2023, 2024, 2025
  - Runners (2): 1998, 2007
- Turkish Super Cup :
  - Winners (11 - Record): 2010, 2012, 2014, 2015, 2016, 2017, 2018, 2019, 2023, 2024, 2025
  - Runners (4): 1999, 2001, 2011, 2013

=== International ===
- Challenge Cup:
  - Semi Final (1): 2009
  - Quarter Final (1): 2003

== European record ==
Season	Competition	Round	Club	Home	Away	Aggregate	Reference
2016–17	EHF Champions League	Group Stage	(France) HBC Nantes	28–33	19–33	3rd place	
2016–17	EHF Champions League	Group Stage	(Ukraine) HC Motor Zaporizhzhia	23–22	28–34	3rd place	
2016–17	EHF Champions League	Group Stage	(Romania) CS Dinamo București	29–27	26–26	3rd place	
2016–17	EHF Champions League	Group Stage	(Denmark) Team Tvis Holstebro	36–27	25–29	3rd place	
2016–17	EHF Champions League	Group Stage	(Portugal) ABC/UMinho	33–31	28–27	3rd place	
2017–18	EHF Champions League	Group Stage	(Portugal) Sporting CP	26–30	27–34	3rd place	
2017–18	EHF Champions League	Group Stage	(North Macedonia) Metalurg Skopje	32–29	31–27	3rd place	
2017–18	EHF Champions League	Group Stage	(Russia) Chekhovskiye Medvedi	33–29	29–27	3rd place	
2017–18	EHF Champions League	Group Stage	(France) Montpellier	32–36	33–28	3rd place	
2017–18	EHF Champions League	Group Stage	(Ukraine) HC Motor Zaporizhzhia	28–28	22–28	3rd place	
2018–19	EHF Champions League	Group Stage	(Slovakia) Tatran Prešov	22–28	23–27	5th place	
2018–19	EHF Champions League	Group Stage	(North Macedonia) Metalurg Skopje	23–22	30–22	5th place	
2018–19	EHF Champions League	Group Stage	(Russia) Chekhovskiye Medvedi	27–30	24–22	5th place	
2018–19	EHF Champions League	Group Stage	(Portugal) Sporting CP	27–33	28–34	5th place	
2018–19	EHF Champions League	Group Stage	(Denmark) Bjerringbro-Silkeborg	24–37	27–34	5th place	

== Famous players ==
- (Croatia) Vedran Zrnić
- (Turkey) Josip Buljubašić
- (Bosnia and Herzegovina) Tomislav Nuić
- (Azerbaijan) Valeri Parshkov
- (Serbia) Vladimir Zelić
- (Serbia) David Rašić
- (Serbia) Marko Krsmančić
- (Serbia) Nemanja Pribak
- (Belarus) Vadzim Lisitsa
- (North Macedonia) Aco Jonovski
- (North Macedonia) Filip Lazarov
- (North Macedonia) Nemanja Pribak
- (Egypt) Karim Handawy
- (Algeria) Hichem Kaabeche
- (France) Cédric Sorhaindo
- (Chile) Erwin Feuchtmann
