= AEK Athens H.C. in European handball competitions =

AEK Athens H.C. in European handball competitions is the history and statistics of AEK H.C. in EHF competitions.

AEK Athens has won one EHF European Cup.

== Honours ==
=== Medals by competition ===
Competition	Gold	Silver	Bronze	Total
EHF Champions League	0	0	0	0
EHF European League/EHF Cup	0	0	0	0
EHF European Cup/EHF Challenge Cup	1	2	1	4
Total	1	2	1	4

=== Medals by year of achievement ===
- EHF European Cup/EHF Challenge Cup: 2017–18, 2018–19, 2020–21, 2024–25

== EHF European competitions record ==
Season	Competition	Round	Club	Home	Away	Aggregate	Qual.
2007–08	EHF Cup	R2	(Romania) Dinamo Baumit București	30–29	36–22	52–65	
2009–10	EHF Cup Winners' Cup	R3	(Turkey) Izmir BSB SK	24–29	22–22	46–51	
2010–11	EHF Challenge Cup	R3	(Belarus) SKA Minsk	31–25	32–27	58–57	
2010–11	EHF Challenge Cup	L16	(Portugal) Sporting CP	32–27	27–23	55–54	
2010–11	EHF Challenge Cup	QF	(Serbia) RK Partizan Beograd	23–24	28–22	45–52	
2011–12	EHF Champions League	QR	(Serbia) RK Partizan Beograd	25–26		4th	
2011–12	EHF Champions League	QR	(Slovenia) Tatran Presov	40–23		4th	
2011–12	EHF Cup	R2	(Netherlands) OCI-Lions	25–27	26–24	49–53	
2012–13	EHF Cup	R1	(Greece) AC Diomidis Argous	29–30	30–18	47–60	
2013–14	EHF Champions League	QR	(Belarus) HC Dinamo Minsk	25–21		3rd	
2013–14	EHF Champions League	QR	(Turkey) Besiktas JK	34–30		3rd	
2013–14	EHF Cup	R3	(Sweden) Lugi HF	22–24	25–23	45–49	
2015–16	EHF Challenge Cup	R3	(Greece) AC Filippos Verias	34–36	32–22	56–68	
2017–18	EHF Challenge Cup	R3	(United Kingdom) London GD	41–21	16–40	81–37	
2017–18	EHF Challenge Cup	L16	(Turkey) Göztepe SK	32–23	29–25	57–52	
2017–18	EHF Challenge Cup	QF	(Luxembourg) Berchem HC	32–25	18–32	64–43	
2017–18	EHF Challenge Cup	SF	(Portugal) AM Madeira Andebol SAD	23–23	21–29	52–44	
2017–18	EHF Challenge Cup	F	(Romania) AHC Potaissa Turda	27–26	33–22	49–59	
2018–19	EHF Challenge Cup	R3	(Austria) Bregenz Handball	29–25	18–20	49–43	
2018–19	EHF Challenge Cup	L16	(Israel) AS SGS Ramhat Hashron	35–25	28–34	69–53	
2018–19	EHF Challenge Cup	QF	(Russia) Dinamo Viktor Stavropol	30–24	25–21	51–49	
2018–19	EHF Challenge Cup	SF	(Portugal) AM Madeira Andebol SAD	22–30	27–22	44–57	
2019–20	EHF Challenge Cup	R3	(Bosnia and Herzegovina) HC Vogošća Poljine Hills	33–27	22–41	74–49	
2019–20	EHF Challenge Cup	L16	(Norway) Drammen HK	33–31	27–27	60–58	
2019–20	EHF Challenge Cup	QF	(Romania) AHC Potaissa Turda	---	---	---	---
2020–21	EHF European Cup	R3	(Kosovo) KH Prishtina	37–19	8–41	78–25	
2020–21	EHF European Cup	L16	(Romania) CSM București	29–23	28–23	52–51	
2020–21	EHF European Cup	QF	(Russia) HC Neva SPb	29–27	21–30	59–48	
2020–21	EHF European Cup	SF	(Slovenia) RK Gorenje	31–29	31–31	62–60	
2020–21	EHF European Cup	F	(Sweden) Ystads IF	30–26	20–24	54–46	
2021–22	EHF European League	Group D	(Hungary) Tatabánya KC	34–26	25–24	5th	
2021–22	EHF European League	Group D	(North Macedonia) RK Pelister	27–30	30–19	5th	
2021–22	EHF European League	Group D	(Portugal) Sporting CP	25–24	31–30	5th	
2021–22	EHF European League	Group D	(Switzerland) Kadetten Schaffhausen	28–31	30–26	5th	
2021–22	EHF European League	Group D	(France) USAM Nîmes	34–30	26–27	5th	
2022–23	EHF European Cup	R2	(Netherlands) HV Hurry-Up	35–30	17–25	60–47	
2022–23	EHF European Cup	R3	(Sweden) Alingsås HK	32–27	31–24	56–58	
2023–24	EHF European League	Group B	(Poland) Górnik Zabrze	26–30	30–21	4th	
2023–24	EHF European League	Group B	(Switzerland) HC Kriens-Luzern	30–29	39–27	4th	
2023–24	EHF European League	Group B	(Germany) TSV Hannover-Burgdorf	29–34	31–25	4th	
2024–25	EHF European Cup	R2	(Italy) Junior Fasano	39–26	20–38	77–46	
2024–25	EHF European Cup	R3	(Montenegro) RK Lovćen	45–26	31–41	86–57	
2024–25	EHF European Cup	L16	(Slovenia) MRK Krka	38–28	25–31	69–53	
2024–25	EHF European Cup	QF	(Serbia) RK Partizan AdmiralBet	27–22	30–26	53–52	
2024–25	EHF European Cup	SF	(Bosnia and Herzegovina) RK Izviđač	37–28	28–24	61–56	
2024–25	EHF European Cup	F	(North Macedonia) RK Alkaloid	25–29	10–0	25–39	
2026–27	EHF European Cup	R2	(Cyprus) Anorthosis Famagusta	–	–	–	

Last updated: 22 September 2026.
Source: history.eurohandball.com

== Statistics record by competition ==
Competitions		Appearances	Played	W	D	L	GF \ GA
1	EHF Champions League	2	4	1	0	3	103–121
2	EHF European League/EHF Cup	6	24	6	0	18	625–703
2	EHF Cup Winners' Cup	1	2	0	1	1	46–51
3	EHF European Cup/EHF Challenge Cup	9	56	36	3	17	1,656–1,413
Overall		18	86	43	4	39	2,430–2,288

Last updated: 22 September 2026.
Source: history.eurohandball.com
