= 2018–19 EHF Challenge Cup =

EHF Challenge Cup
- 2018–19

Tournament information
- Sport: Handball
- Dates: 6 October 2018–19 May 2019
- Teams: 48
- Website: eurohandball.com

Final positions
- Champions: (Romania) CSM București
- Runner-up: (Portugal) Madeira Andebol SAD

Tournament statistics
- Top scorer(s): Elledy Semedo (58 goals)

The 2018–19 EHF Challenge Cup was the 22nd edition of the European Handball Federation's third-tier competition for men's handball clubs, running from 6 October 2018 to 19 May 2019.

== Overview ==
=== Team allocation ===
Round 3
(Belgium) HC Visé BM	(Bosnia and Herzegovina) HC Vogošća Poljine Hills	(Bulgaria) HC Dobrudja	(Czech Republic) HC Dukla Prague
(Greece) AEK Athens	(Israel) Ramat Hasharon HC	(Luxembourg) HC Berchem	(Netherlands) KRAS Volendam
(Portugal) Madeira Andebol SAD	(Norway) Bodø HK	(Romania) CSM București	(Russia) HC Neva SPb
(Slovakia) MŠK Považská Bystrica	(Serbia) RK Partizan	(Ukraine) Donbass	(Turkey) Göztepe SK
Round 2
(Austria) Bregenz Handball	(Azerbaijan) HC Baki	(Bosnia and Herzegovina) RK Borac m:tel	(Belgium) Estudiantes EHC Tournai
(Belarus) Masheka Mogilev	(Cyprus) Parnassos Strovolou	(Estonia) HC Tallinn	(Finland) HC Dicken
(Kosovo) KHF Prishtina	(Montenegro) MRK Jedinstvo	(Moldova) HC Olimpus-85 USEFS	(United Kingdom) Livingston HC
(Italy) Pallamano Pressano	(Lithuania) VHC Šviesa Vilnius	(Georgia (country)) IMEDI Telavi	(Latvia) Celtnieks Riga
(Greece) AC Diomidis Argous	(Norway) ØIF Arendal	(Luxembourg) HB Dudelange	(Netherlands) JD Techniek Hurry-Up
(Russia) Dinamo Viktor Stavropol	(Turkey) Selka Eskişehir HSK	(Israel) Holon Handball Club	(United Kingdom) London GD HC
(Kosovo) KH Kastrioti	(Moldova) Colos SS4 Ciobruciu	(Lithuania) Granitas Karys Kaunas	(Greece) Aeropos Edessa
(Moldova) PGU Tiraspol	(United Kingdom) Olympia HC	(Lithuania) HC Kauno Azuolas-KTU	(Ukraine) HC ZNTU-ZAB Zaporozhye

=== Round and draw dates ===
All draws were held at the European Handball Federation headquarters in Vienna, Austria.

Round	Draw date	First leg	Second leg
Round 2	17 July 2018	6–7 October 2018	13–14 October 2018
Round 3	17 July 2018	17–18 November 2018	24–25 November 2018
Last 16	27 November 2018	9–10 February 2019	16–17 February 2019
Quarter-final	19 February 2019	23–24 March 2019	30–31 March 2019
Semi-finals	19 February 2019	20–21 April 2019	27–28 April 2019
Finals	30 April 2019	11–12 May 2019	18–19 May 2019

== Round 2 ==
Teams listed first played the first leg at home. Some teams agreed to play both matches in the same venue. The first legs were played on 6–7 October and the second legs were played on 13–14 October 2018.

Team 1	Agg.	Team 2	1st leg	2nd leg
London GD HC (United Kingdom)	46–42 ^{1}	(United Kingdom) Livingston HC	23–19	23–23
HC Baki (Azerbaijan)	43–69 ^{2}	(Bosnia and Herzegovina) RK Borac m:tel	19–36	24–33
Aeropos Edessa (Greece)	41–58 ^{3}	(Belarus) Masheka Mogilev	20–24	21–34
MRK Jedinstvo (Montenegro)	46–73 ^{4}	(Lithuania) HC Kauno Azuolas-KTU	22–37	24–36
Celtnieks Riga (Latvia)	58–60 ^{5}	(Israel) Holon Handball Club	33–31	25–29
Estudiantes EHC Tournai (Belgium)	56–57 ^{6}	(Cyprus) Parnassos Strovolou	31–29	25–28
Selka Eskişehir HSK (Turkey)	63–69	(Norway) ØIF Arendal	34–28	29–41
HB Dudelange (Luxembourg)	73–38 ^{7}	(Georgia (country)) IMEDI Telavi	32–25	41–13
HC Dicken (Finland)	66–46 ^{8}	(Moldova) PGU Tiraspol	37–26	29–20
Granitas Karys Kaunas (Lithuania)	48–56	(Lithuania) VHC Šviesa Vilnius	22–24	26–32
Colos SS4 Ciobruciu (Moldova)	34–114 ^{9}	(Austria) Bregenz Handball	20–54	14–60
AC Diomidis Argous (Greece)	47–70 ^{10}	(Russia) Dinamo Viktor Stavropol	19–38	28–32
HC Olimpus-85 USEFS (Moldova)	37–72 ^{11}	(Netherlands) JD Techniek Hurry-Up	16–30	21–42
Olympia HC (United Kingdom)	39–77 ^{12}	(Italy) Pallamano Pressano	16–40	23–37
HC ZNTU-ZAB Zaporozhye (Ukraine)	68–44 ^{13}	(Kosovo) KHF Prishtina	32–19	36–25
HC Tallinn (Estonia)	47–51 ^{14}	(Kosovo) KH Kastrioti	22–25	25–26

Notes

^{1} Both legs were hosted by Livingston HC.
^{2} Both legs were hosted by RK Borac m:tel.
^{3} Both legs were hosted by Masheka Mogilev.
^{4} Both legs were hosted by HC Kauno Azuolas-KTU.
^{5} Both legs were hosted by Celtnieks Riga.
^{6} Both legs were hosted by EHC Tournai.
^{7} Both legs were hosted by HB Dudelange.
^{8} Both legs were hosted by HC Dicken.
^{9} Both legs were hosted by Bregenz Handball.
^{10} Both legs were hosted by Dynamo-Victor.
^{11} Both legs were hosted by HV Hurry-Up.
^{12} Both legs were hosted by Pallamano Pressano.
^{13} Both legs were hosted by KHF Prishtina.
^{14} Both legs were hosted by KH Kastrioti.

== Round 3 ==
Teams listed first played the first leg at home. Some teams agreed to play both matches in the same venue. The first legs were played on 17–18 November and the second legs were played on 24–25 November 2018

Team 1	Agg.	Team 2	1st leg	2nd leg
RK Partizan (Serbia)	58–60	(Finland) HC Dicken	33–28	25–32
HC Vogošća Poljine Hills (Bosnia and Herzegovina)	40–53	(Bosnia and Herzegovina) RK Borac m:tel	22–23	18–30
KRAS Volendam (Netherlands)	56–60	(Russia) Dinamo Viktor Stavropol	32–32	24–28
HC Neva SPb (Russia)	55–28 ^{1}	(Luxembourg) HB Dudelange	31–12	24–16
AEK Athens (Greece)	49–43	(Austria) Bregenz Handball	29–25	20–18
Pallamano Pressano (Italy)	47–57	(Slovakia) MŠK Považská Bystrica	24–28	23–29
Holon Handball Club (Israel)	57–65 ^{2}	(Luxembourg) HC Berchem	28–33	29–32
Masheka Mogilev (Belarus)	81–48 ^{3}	(Bulgaria) HC Dobrudja	34–25	47–23
HC Dukla Prague (Czech Republic)	55–48 ^{4}	(Lithuania) HC Kauno Azuolas-KTU	27–20	28–28
Donbass (Ukraine)	73–37 ^{5}	(United Kingdom) London GD HC	40–22	33–15
HC Visé BM (Belgium)	71–47	(Kosovo) KH Kastrioti	33–21	38–26
HC ZNTU-ZAB Zaporozhye (Ukraine)	57–60 ^{6}	(Israel) Ramat Hasharon HC	32–27	25–33
VHC Šviesa Vilnius (Lithuania)	58–49	(Norway) Bodø HK	35–23	23–26
JD Techniek/Hurry-Up (Netherlands)	49–69	(Portugal) Madeira Andebol SAD	21–37	28–32
CSM București (Romania)	79–38 ^{7}	(Cyprus) Parnassos Strovolou	32–24	47–14
ØIF Arendal (Norway)	68–53	(Turkey) Göztepe SK	40–25	28–28

Notes

^{1} Both legs were hosted by HC Neva SPb.
^{2} Both legs were hosted by HC Berchem.
^{3} Both legs were hosted by Masheka Mogilev.
^{4} Both legs were hosted by HC Dukla Prague.
^{5} Both legs were hosted by Donbass.
^{6} Both legs were hosted by Ramat HaSharon HC.
^{7} Both legs were hosted by CSM București.

== Last 16 ==
The draw seeding pots for the Last 16 Knockout round were composed as follows:

Pot 1	Pot 2
(Belgium) HC Visé BM; (Greece) AEK Athens; (Lithuania) VHC Šviesa Vilnius; (Luxembourg) HC Berchem; (Portugal) Madeira Andebol SAD; (Romania) CSM București; (Russia) Dinamo Viktor Stavropol; (Russia) HC Neva SPb	(Bosnia and Herzegovina) RK Borac m:tel; (Belarus) Masheka Mogilev; (Czech Republic) HC Dukla Prague; (Finland) HC Dicken; (Israel) Ramat Hasharon HC; (Norway) ØIF Arendal; (Slovakia) MŠK Považská Bystrica; (Ukraine) Donbass

The draw for the last 16 round was held on 27 November 2018. The first leg was scheduled for 9–10 February, while the second leg followed on 16–17 February 2019.Some teams agreed to play both matches in the same venue.

Team 1	Agg.	Team 2	1st leg	2nd leg
Ramat Hasharon HC (Israel)	53–69	(Greece) AEK Athens	28–34	25–35
MŠK Považská Bystrica (Slovakia)	45–56	(Russia) HC Neva SPb	21–31	24–25
Donbass (Ukraine)	47–60 ^{1}	(Portugal) Madeira Andebol SAD	22–32	25–28
HC Dukla Prague (Czech Republic)	48–58	(Romania) CSM București	23–28	25–30
Masheka Mogilev (Belarus)	65–68	(Belgium) HC Visé BM	31–32	34–36
ØIF Arendal (Norway)	49–53	(Russia) Dinamo Viktor Stavropol	27–21	22–31
HC Berchem (Luxembourg)	50–56 ^{2}	(Finland) HC Dicken	24–28	26–28
VHC Šviesa Vilnius (Lithuania)	38–52	(Bosnia and Herzegovina) RK Borac m:tel	16–29	22–23

Notes

^{1} Both legs were hosted by Madeira Andebol SAD.
^{2} Both legs were hosted by HC Berchem.

=== Matches ===
9 February 2019; 17:30	HC Berchem (Luxembourg)	24–28	(Finland) HC Dicken	Hall Omnisports de Crauthem, Crauthem; Attendance: 620; Referees: Carmaux, Mursch (FRA)
9 February 2019; 17:30	Tsatso 8	(13–19)	Broman 8	Hall Omnisports de Crauthem, Crauthem; Attendance: 620; Referees: Carmaux, Mursch (FRA)
9 February 2019; 17:30	1× (yellow card) 2× (suspension)	Report	3× (yellow card) 3× (suspension)	Hall Omnisports de Crauthem, Crauthem; Attendance: 620; Referees: Carmaux, Mursch (FRA)

10 February 2019; 17:30	HC Dicken (Finland)	28–26	(Luxembourg) HC Berchem	Hall Omnisports de Crauthem, Crauthem; Attendance: 520; Referees: Carmaux, Mursch (FRA)
10 February 2019; 17:30	three players 4	(14–12)	Tsatso 8	Hall Omnisports de Crauthem, Crauthem; Attendance: 520; Referees: Carmaux, Mursch (FRA)
10 February 2019; 17:30	2× (yellow card) 7× (suspension)	Report	1× (yellow card) 4× (suspension)	Hall Omnisports de Crauthem, Crauthem; Attendance: 520; Referees: Carmaux, Mursch (FRA)

HC Dicken won 56–50 on aggregate.

9 February 2019; 18:00	MŠK Považská Bystrica (Slovakia)	21–31	(Russia) HC Neva SPb	Sporting Hall MSK, Považská Bystrica; Attendance: 1,200; Referees: Aliyev, Aghakishiyev (AZE)
9 February 2019; 18:00	Vallo 8	(11–14)	Voronin 9	Sporting Hall MSK, Považská Bystrica; Attendance: 1,200; Referees: Aliyev, Aghakishiyev (AZE)
9 February 2019; 18:00	2× (yellow card) 2× (suspension)	Report	2× (yellow card) 4× (suspension)	Sporting Hall MSK, Považská Bystrica; Attendance: 1,200; Referees: Aliyev, Aghakishiyev (AZE)

15 February 2019; 17:15	HC Neva SPb (Russia)	25–24	(Slovakia) MŠK Považská Bystrica	Interuniversity sports center (MUSC), Saint Petersburg; Attendance: 450; Referees: Bozhinovski, Nachevski (MKD)
15 February 2019; 17:15	Babkin, Voronin 5	(11–8)	Bystrický 6	Interuniversity sports center (MUSC), Saint Petersburg; Attendance: 450; Referees: Bozhinovski, Nachevski (MKD)
15 February 2019; 17:15	3× (suspension)	Report	3× (yellow card) 1× (suspension)	Interuniversity sports center (MUSC), Saint Petersburg; Attendance: 450; Referees: Bozhinovski, Nachevski (MKD)

HC Neva SPb won 56–45 on aggregate.

9 February 2019; 18:00	Ramat Hasharon HC (Israel)	28-34	(Greece) A.E.K. Athens	Oranim Sports hall, Ramat HaSharon; Attendance: 267; Referees: Sekulić, Jovandić (SRB)
9 February 2019; 18:00	Pomeranz 9	(15–17)	Jakobsen 8	Oranim Sports hall, Ramat HaSharon; Attendance: 267; Referees: Sekulić, Jovandić (SRB)
9 February 2019; 18:00	4× (yellow card) 2× (suspension)	Report	3× (yellow card) 5× (suspension)	Oranim Sports hall, Ramat HaSharon; Attendance: 267; Referees: Sekulić, Jovandić (SRB)

16 February 2019; 14:00	A.E.K. Athens (Greece)	35–25	(Israel) Ramat Hasharon HC	O.A.C.A. Olympic Indoor Hall, Athens; Attendance: 700; Referees: Capoccia, Jucker (SUI)
16 February 2019; 14:00	Jakobsen, Mylonas 5	(17–15)	Pomeranz 5	O.A.C.A. Olympic Indoor Hall, Athens; Attendance: 700; Referees: Capoccia, Jucker (SUI)
16 February 2019; 14:00	1× (yellow card) 8× (suspension)	Report	3× (yellow card) 3× (suspension)	O.A.C.A. Olympic Indoor Hall, Athens; Attendance: 700; Referees: Capoccia, Jucker (SUI)

A.E.K. Athens won 69–53 on aggregate.

10 February 2019; 18:00	ØIF Arendal (Norway)	27–21	(Russia) Dinamo Viktor Stavropol	Sparebanken Sör Amfi, Arendal; Attendance: 1,276; Referees: Čerņavskis, Bogdanovs (LAT)
10 February 2019; 18:00	Lindboe 12	(13–10)	Nekrasov 6	Sparebanken Sör Amfi, Arendal; Attendance: 1,276; Referees: Čerņavskis, Bogdanovs (LAT)
10 February 2019; 18:00	2× (yellow card) 5× (suspension)	Report	2× (yellow card) 5× (suspension)	Sparebanken Sör Amfi, Arendal; Attendance: 1,276; Referees: Čerņavskis, Bogdanovs (LAT)

16 February 2019; 15:00	Dinamo Viktor Stavropol (Russia)	31–22	(Norway) ØIF Arendal	STC Lukomore, Budyonnovsk; Attendance: 750; Referees: Frieser, Kavulič (CZE)
16 February 2019; 15:00	Dashko 8	(18–13)	Lindell 6	STC Lukomore, Budyonnovsk; Attendance: 750; Referees: Frieser, Kavulič (CZE)
16 February 2019; 15:00	3× (yellow card) 3× (suspension)	Report	4× (yellow card) 6× (suspension) 1× (red card)	STC Lukomore, Budyonnovsk; Attendance: 750; Referees: Frieser, Kavulič (CZE)

Dinamo Viktor Stavropol won 53–49 on aggregate.

10 February 2019; 19:30	HC Dukla Prague (Czech Republic)	23–28	(Romania) CSM București	DHC Sport Hall SK Slavia Praha, Prague; Attendance: 300; Referees: Butskevich, Butskevich (BLR)
10 February 2019; 19:30	Blecha 6	(10–19)	Rotaru 6	DHC Sport Hall SK Slavia Praha, Prague; Attendance: 300; Referees: Butskevich, Butskevich (BLR)
10 February 2019; 19:30	3× (yellow card) 5× (suspension)	Report	2× (yellow card) 4× (suspension)	DHC Sport Hall SK Slavia Praha, Prague; Attendance: 300; Referees: Butskevich, Butskevich (BLR)

16 February 2019; 16:00	CSM București (Romania)	30–25	(Czech Republic) HC Dukla Prague	Dinamo Polyvalent Hall, Bucharest; Attendance: 800; Referees: Novikov, Rozhkov (UKR)
16 February 2019; 16:00	Mănescu, Teixeira 8	(15–10)	Klíma 6	Dinamo Polyvalent Hall, Bucharest; Attendance: 800; Referees: Novikov, Rozhkov (UKR)
16 February 2019; 16:00	1× (yellow card) 4× (suspension)	Report	2× (yellow card) 2× (suspension)	Dinamo Polyvalent Hall, Bucharest; Attendance: 800; Referees: Novikov, Rozhkov (UKR)

CSM București won 58–48 on aggregate.

9 February 2019; 16:00	VHC Šviesa Vilnius (Lithuania)	16–29	(Bosnia and Herzegovina) RK Borac m:tel	Lues Sport Hall, Vilnius; Attendance: 400; Referees: Loshak, Shajbakov (UKR)
9 February 2019; 16:00	Drabavičius 7	(8–12)	Daničić 6	Lues Sport Hall, Vilnius; Attendance: 400; Referees: Loshak, Shajbakov (UKR)
9 February 2019; 16:00	2× (suspension)	Report	2× (yellow card) 5× (suspension)	Lues Sport Hall, Vilnius; Attendance: 400; Referees: Loshak, Shajbakov (UKR)

16 February 2019; 20:00	RK Borac m:tel (Bosnia and Herzegovina)	23–22	(Lithuania) VHC Šviesa Vilnius	Sportska Dvorana "Borik", Banja Luka; Attendance: 2,500; Referees: Di Domenico, Fornasier (ITA)
16 February 2019; 20:00	Miljković, Unčanin 4	Report	Drabavičius 8	Sportska Dvorana "Borik", Banja Luka; Attendance: 2,500; Referees: Di Domenico, Fornasier (ITA)
16 February 2019; 20:00	3× (yellow card) 5× (suspension)		3× (yellow card) 2× (suspension)	Sportska Dvorana "Borik", Banja Luka; Attendance: 2,500; Referees: Di Domenico, Fornasier (ITA)

RK Borac m:tel won 52–38 on aggregate.

10 February 2019; 15:00	Masheka Mogilev (Belarus)	31–32	(Belgium) HC Visé BM	Sport Complex "Olympiets", Mogilev; Attendance: 1,400; Referees: Ivanović, Vujisić (MNE)
10 February 2019; 15:00	Tilnenko 10	(14–16)	Carvalhais, Hadžić 5	Sport Complex "Olympiets", Mogilev; Attendance: 1,400; Referees: Ivanović, Vujisić (MNE)
10 February 2019; 15:00	2× (yellow card) 3× (suspension)	Report	2× (yellow card) 6× (suspension)	Sport Complex "Olympiets", Mogilev; Attendance: 1,400; Referees: Ivanović, Vujisić (MNE)

17 February 2019; 16:00	HC Visé BM (Belgium)	36–34	(Belarus) Masheka Mogilev	Hall Omnisports de Visé, Visé; Attendance: 500; Referees: Fremstad, Pedersen (NOR)
17 February 2019; 16:00	Rola 9	(18–14)	Mikhalchuk 10	Hall Omnisports de Visé, Visé; Attendance: 500; Referees: Fremstad, Pedersen (NOR)
17 February 2019; 16:00	2× (yellow card) 5× (suspension)	Report	1× (yellow card)	Hall Omnisports de Visé, Visé; Attendance: 500; Referees: Fremstad, Pedersen (NOR)

HC Visé BM won 68–65 on aggregate.

16 February 2019; 20:00	Donbass (Ukraine)	22–32	(Portugal) Madeira Andebol SAD	Pavilhao Gimnodesportivo, Funchal; Attendance: 350; Referees: Rosendo, Estévez (ESP)
16 February 2019; 20:00	Honcharov, Ivanov 6	(12–13)	Landim 7	Pavilhao Gimnodesportivo, Funchal; Attendance: 350; Referees: Rosendo, Estévez (ESP)
16 February 2019; 20:00	1× (yellow card) 3× (suspension)	Report	2× (yellow card) 5× (suspension)	Pavilhao Gimnodesportivo, Funchal; Attendance: 350; Referees: Rosendo, Estévez (ESP)

17 February 2019; 18:00	Madeira Andebol SAD (Portugal)	28–25	(Ukraine) Donbass	Pavilhao Gimnodesportivo, Funchal; Attendance: 350; Referees: Rosendo, Estévez (ESP)
17 February 2019; 18:00	Semedo 8	(12–14)	Ivanov, Orlovskyi 7	Pavilhao Gimnodesportivo, Funchal; Attendance: 350; Referees: Rosendo, Estévez (ESP)
17 February 2019; 18:00	2× (yellow card) 5× (suspension)	Report	4× (yellow card) 4× (suspension)	Pavilhao Gimnodesportivo, Funchal; Attendance: 350; Referees: Rosendo, Estévez (ESP)

Madeira Andebol SAD won 60–47 on aggregate.

== Quarterfinals ==
The draw event was held at the EHF Office in Vienna on Tuesday 19 February 2019. The draw determined the quarter-final and also the semi-final pairings. Teams listed first will play the first leg at home. For the quarter-finals, there was no seeding as all eight teams were drawn from the same pot one after another. There was also no country protection applied in the draw. The semi-final draw followed using the quarter-final pairings.

The first quarter-final leg is scheduled for 23–24 March, while the second leg will follow on 30–31 March 2019.

Team 1	Agg.	Team 2	1st leg	2nd leg
Dinamo Viktor Stavropol (Russia)	49–51	(Greece) AEK Athens	25–21	24–30
Madeira Andebol SAD (Portugal)	54–53	(Finland) HC Dicken	28–27	26–26
HC Visé BM (Belgium)	45–74	(Russia) HC Neva SPb	26–33	19–41
CSM București (Romania)	54–42	(Bosnia and Herzegovina) RK Borac m:tel	25–19	29–23

=== Matches ===
23 March 2019; 15:00	Dinamo Viktor Stavropol (Russia)	25–21	(Greece) A.E.K. Athens	STC Lukomore, Budyonnovsk; Attendance: 930; Referees: Kaludjerović, Vujacić (MNE)
23 March 2019; 15:00	Krivenko 8	(13–13)	Jakobsen, Mylonas 5	STC Lukomore, Budyonnovsk; Attendance: 930; Referees: Kaludjerović, Vujacić (MNE)
23 March 2019; 15:00	1× (yellow card)	Report	3× (yellow card) 5× (suspension)	STC Lukomore, Budyonnovsk; Attendance: 930; Referees: Kaludjerović, Vujacić (MNE)

30 March 2019; 14:00	A.E.K. Athens (Greece)	30-24	(Russia) Dinamo Viktor Stavropol	O.A.C.A. Olympic Indoor Hall, Athens; Attendance: 800; Referees: Fremstad, Pedersen (NOR)
30 March 2019; 14:00	Jakobsen 11	(14–9)	Otrezov 7	O.A.C.A. Olympic Indoor Hall, Athens; Attendance: 800; Referees: Fremstad, Pedersen (NOR)
30 March 2019; 14:00	3× (yellow card) 7× (suspension)	Report	2× (yellow card) 3× (suspension)	O.A.C.A. Olympic Indoor Hall, Athens; Attendance: 800; Referees: Fremstad, Pedersen (NOR)

A.E.K. Athens won 51–49 on aggregate.

23 March 2019; 16:00	CSM București (Romania)	25–19	(Bosnia and Herzegovina) RK Borac m:tel	Dinamo Polyvalent Hall, Bucharest; Attendance: 850; Referees: Chrzan, Janas (POL)
23 March 2019; 16:00	Santos 8	(16–7)	Dakić, Savić 4	Dinamo Polyvalent Hall, Bucharest; Attendance: 850; Referees: Chrzan, Janas (POL)
23 March 2019; 16:00	3× (suspension)	Report	3× (yellow card) 5× (suspension)	Dinamo Polyvalent Hall, Bucharest; Attendance: 850; Referees: Chrzan, Janas (POL)

30 March 2019; 20:00	RK Borac m:tel (Bosnia and Herzegovina)	23–29	(Romania) CSM București	Sportska Dvorana "Borik", Banja Luka; Attendance: 3,300; Referees: Jovchev, Yonchev (BUL)
30 March 2019; 20:00	Đurđević 7	(9–16)	Vražalić 6	Sportska Dvorana "Borik", Banja Luka; Attendance: 3,300; Referees: Jovchev, Yonchev (BUL)
30 March 2019; 20:00	2× (yellow card) 4× (suspension)	Report	2× (yellow card) 2× (suspension)	Sportska Dvorana "Borik", Banja Luka; Attendance: 3,300; Referees: Jovchev, Yonchev (BUL)

CSM București won 54–42 on aggregate.

24 March 2019; 17:00	Madeira Andebol SAD (Portugal)	28–27	(Finland) HC Dicken	Pavilhao Gimnodesportivo, Funchal; Attendance: 475; Referees: Geraets, Geraets (NED)
24 March 2019; 17:00	Pereira, Ribeiro 5	(15–9)	Granlund 9	Pavilhao Gimnodesportivo, Funchal; Attendance: 475; Referees: Geraets, Geraets (NED)
24 March 2019; 17:00	2× (yellow card) 2× (suspension)	Report	3× (yellow card) 1× (suspension)	Pavilhao Gimnodesportivo, Funchal; Attendance: 475; Referees: Geraets, Geraets (NED)

30 March 2019; 14:30	HC Dicken (Finland)	26–26	(Portugal) Madeira Andebol SAD	Pirkkola Arena, Helsinki; Attendance: 500; Referees: Xhema, Jahja (KOS)
30 March 2019; 14:30	Granlund 7	(10–12)	António, Semedo 7	Pirkkola Arena, Helsinki; Attendance: 500; Referees: Xhema, Jahja (KOS)
30 March 2019; 14:30	1× (yellow card) 3× (suspension) 1× (red card)	Report	2× (yellow card) 4× (suspension)	Pirkkola Arena, Helsinki; Attendance: 500; Referees: Xhema, Jahja (KOS)

Madeira Andebol SAD won 54–53 on aggregate.

24 March 2019; 16:00	HC Visé BM (Belgium)	26–33	(Russia) HC Neva SPb	Hall Omnisports de Visé, Visé; Attendance: 600; Referees: Hofer, Schmidhuber (AUT)
24 March 2019; 16:00	Hodžić 7	(13–17)	Babkin, Turaev 8	Hall Omnisports de Visé, Visé; Attendance: 600; Referees: Hofer, Schmidhuber (AUT)
24 March 2019; 16:00	2× (yellow card) 4× (suspension)	Report	2× (yellow card) 4× (suspension)	Hall Omnisports de Visé, Visé; Attendance: 600; Referees: Hofer, Schmidhuber (AUT)

31 March 2019; 14:00	HC Neva SPb (Russia)	41–19	(Belgium) HC Visé BM	Interuniversity sports center (MUSC), Saint Petersburg; Attendance: 300; Referees: Jerlecki, Labun (POL)
31 March 2019; 14:00	Makin 10	(22–10)	Lahonda 5	Interuniversity sports center (MUSC), Saint Petersburg; Attendance: 300; Referees: Jerlecki, Labun (POL)
31 March 2019; 14:00	3× (yellow card) 4× (suspension)	Report	3× (yellow card) 2× (suspension)	Interuniversity sports center (MUSC), Saint Petersburg; Attendance: 300; Referees: Jerlecki, Labun (POL)

HC Neva SPb won 74–45 on aggregate.

== Semifinals ==
The first semi-final legs was scheduled for 20–21 April 2019, while the second legs followed on 27–28 April 2019.

Team 1	Agg.	Team 2	1st leg	2nd leg
HC Neva SPb (Russia)	44–51	(Romania) CSM București	24–26	20–25
Madeira Andebol SAD (Portugal)	57–44	(Greece) AEK Athens	27–22	30–22

=== Matches ===
20 April 2019; 14:00	HC Neva SPb (Russia)	24–26	(Romania) CSM București	Interuniversity sports center (MUSC), Saint Petersburg; Attendance: 400; Referees: Jović, Arnautović (BIH)
20 April 2019; 14:00	Emelyanenko 6	(13–11)	Teixeira 7	Interuniversity sports center (MUSC), Saint Petersburg; Attendance: 400; Referees: Jović, Arnautović (BIH)
20 April 2019; 14:00	1× (yellow card) 4× (suspension)	Report	4× (yellow card) 3× (suspension)	Interuniversity sports center (MUSC), Saint Petersburg; Attendance: 400; Referees: Jović, Arnautović (BIH)

27 April 2019; 16:00	CSM București (Romania)	25–20	(Russia) HC Neva SPb	Dinamo Polyvalent Hall, Bucharest; Attendance: 500; Referees: Vitaku, Vitaku (KOS)
27 April 2019; 16:00	Teixeira 8	(15–11)	Emelyanenko, Turaev 4	Dinamo Polyvalent Hall, Bucharest; Attendance: 500; Referees: Vitaku, Vitaku (KOS)
27 April 2019; 16:00	3× (yellow card) 2× (suspension)	Report	2× (yellow card) 2× (suspension)	Dinamo Polyvalent Hall, Bucharest; Attendance: 500; Referees: Vitaku, Vitaku (KOS)

CSM București won 51–44 on aggregate.

20 April 2019; 18:00	Madeira Andebol SAD (Portugal)	27–22	(Greece) A.E.K. Athens	Pavilhao Gimnodesportivo, Funchal; Attendance: 640; Referees: Canbro, Kliko (SWE)
20 April 2019; 18:00	Ribeiro 9	(12–10)	Baláž, Jakobsen 6	Pavilhao Gimnodesportivo, Funchal; Attendance: 640; Referees: Canbro, Kliko (SWE)
20 April 2019; 18:00	3× (yellow card) 4× (suspension)	Report	3× (yellow card) 5× (suspension)	Pavilhao Gimnodesportivo, Funchal; Attendance: 640; Referees: Canbro, Kliko (SWE)

27 April 2019; 15:00	A.E.K. Athens (Greece)	22–30	(Portugal) Madeira Andebol SAD	O.A.C.A. Olympic Indoor Hall, Athens; Attendance: 800; Referees: Budzák, Záhradník (SVK)
27 April 2019; 15:00	Palevičius 7	(9-13)	António 7	O.A.C.A. Olympic Indoor Hall, Athens; Attendance: 800; Referees: Budzák, Záhradník (SVK)
27 April 2019; 15:00	3× (yellow card) 7× (suspension)	Report	2× (yellow card) 6× (suspension) 1× (red card)	O.A.C.A. Olympic Indoor Hall, Athens; Attendance: 800; Referees: Budzák, Záhradník (SVK)

Madeira Andebol SAD won 57–44 on aggregate.

== Final ==
The first leg was played on 11–12 May and the second was played on 18–19 May 2019. The final home rights draw was held on 30 April 2019 in Vienna.

Team 1	Agg.	Team 2	1st leg	2nd leg
Madeira Andebol SAD (Portugal)	42–48	(Romania) CSM București	22–22	20–26

=== Matches ===
12 May 2019; 16:30	Madeira Andebol SAD (Portugal)	22–22	(Romania) CSM București	Pavilhão do Marítimo, Funchal; Attendance: 1,000; Referees: Buache, Meyer (SUI)
12 May 2019; 16:30	António 7	(9–8)	A.Esteki 5	Pavilhão do Marítimo, Funchal; Attendance: 1,000; Referees: Buache, Meyer (SUI)
12 May 2019; 16:30	3× (yellow card) 4× (suspension)	Report	4× (yellow card) 5× (suspension)	Pavilhão do Marítimo, Funchal; Attendance: 1,000; Referees: Buache, Meyer (SUI)

18 May 2019; 13:30	CSM București (Romania)	26–20	(Portugal) Madeira Andebol SAD	Dinamo Polyvalent Hall, Bucharest; Attendance: 1,500; Referees: Katsikis, Michailidis (GRE)
18 May 2019; 13:30	S.Esteki, Rotaru 6	(16–9)	Semedo 6	Dinamo Polyvalent Hall, Bucharest; Attendance: 1,500; Referees: Katsikis, Michailidis (GRE)
18 May 2019; 13:30	4× (yellow card) 3× (suspension)	Report	3× (yellow card) 3× (suspension)	Dinamo Polyvalent Hall, Bucharest; Attendance: 1,500; Referees: Katsikis, Michailidis (GRE)

CSM București won 48–42 on aggregate.

== Top goalscorers ==
Rank	Player	Club	Goals
1	(Portugal) Elledy Semedo	(Portugal) Madeira Andebol SAD	58
2	(Denmark) Lars Jakobsen	(Greece) AEK Athens	48
3	(Portugal) Ribeiro Ulisses	(Portugal) Madeira Andebol SAD	40

== See also ==
- 2018–19 EHF Champions League
- 2018–19 EHF Cup
- 2018–19 Women's EHF Cup
- 2018–19 Women's EHF Challenge Cup
