= 2017–18 EHF Challenge Cup =

EHF Challenge Cup
- 2017–18

Tournament information
- Sport: Handball
- Dates: 7 October 2017–20 May 2018
- Teams: 40
- Website: eurohandball.com

Final positions
- Champions: (Romania) AHC Potaissa Turda
- Runner-up: (Greece) A.E.K. Athens

Tournament statistics
- Top scorer(s): Anton Otrezov (71 goals)

The 2017–18 EHF Challenge Cup was the 21st edition of the European Handball Federation's third-tier competition for men's handball clubs, running from 7 October 2017 to 20 May 2018.

== Overview ==
=== Team allocation ===
Round 3
(North Macedonia) HC Eurofarm Rabotnik	(Norway) FyllingenBergen	(Iceland) IBV Vestmannaeyjar	(Cyprus) Parnassos Strovolou
(Portugal) AM Madeira Andebol SAD	(Serbia) HC Sloga Zmartforce	(Kosovo) KH Trepça	(Moldova) PGU-Kartina TV Tiraspol
(Romania) AHC Potaissa Turda	(Slovakia) MŠK Považská Bystrica	(Luxembourg) HC Berchem	(United Kingdom) London GD HC
(Ukraine) HC ZNTU-ZAB Zaporozhye	(Belgium) HC Visé BM	(Israel) SGS Ramhat Hashron HC	(Lithuania) Granitas Karys Kaunas
(Belarus) HC Gomel	(Turkey) Göztepe SK	(Bosnia and Herzegovina) HMRK Zrinjski Mostar	(Montenegro) RK Lovćen
(Russia) SKIF Krasnodar	(Greece) A.E.K. Athens	(Bulgaria) HC Dobrudja	(Georgia (country)) B.S.B. Batumi
Round 2
(Ukraine) Donbass Donetsk Region	(Greece) A.C. PAOK	(Bosnia and Herzegovina) RK Konjuh-Živinice	(Lithuania) VHC Šviesa Vilnius
(Russia) Dynamo-Victor	(Luxembourg) Red Boys Differdange	(Bosnia and Herzegovina) HC Vogošća Poljine Hills	(Lithuania) Kauno Azuolas-KTU Kaunas
(Serbia) ORK Samot 65	(Luxembourg) HB Käerjeng	(Cyprus) Proodeftikos Paphos	(Montenegro) RK Mojkovac 2005
(Turkey) Taşova Yibo SC	(Israel) Holon Handball Club	(United Kingdom) Cambridge HC	(Malta) Aloysians Prominent

=== Round and draw dates ===
All draws held at the European Handball Federation headquarters in Vienna, Austria.

Round	Draw date	First leg	Second leg
Round 2	18 July 2017	7–8 October 2017	14–15 October 2017
Round 3	18 July 2017	18–19 November 2017	25–26 November 2017
Last 16	28 November 2017	10–11 February 2018	17–18 February 2018
Quarter-final	20 February 2018	24–25 March 2018	31 March–1 April 2018
Semi-finals	20 February 2018	21–22 April 2018	28–29 April 2018
Finals	1 May 2018	12–13 May 2018	19–20 May 2018

== Round 2 ==
Teams listed first played the first leg at home. Some teams agreed to play both matches in the same venue. Bolded teams qualified into Round 3.

Team 1	Agg.	Team 2	1st leg	2nd leg
**HC Vogošća Poljine Hills** (Bosnia and Herzegovina)	54–48	(Israel) Holon Handball Club	31–24	23–24
**Red Boys Differdange** (Luxembourg)	57–52	(Lithuania) Kauno Azuolas-KTU Kaunas	32–26	25–26
Taşova Yibo SC (Turkey)	0–20	(Montenegro) **RK Mojkovac 2005**	0–10	0–10
Aloysians Prominent (Malta)	32–73	(Greece) **A.C. PAOK**	17–34	15–39
**ORK Samot 65** (Serbia)	75–45	(United Kingdom) Cambridge HC	43–21	32–24
**HB Käerjeng** (Luxembourg)	69–58	(Ukraine) Donbass Donetsk Region	32–30	37–28
VHC Šviesa Vilnius (Lithuania)	48–61	(Russia) **Dynamo-Victor**	24–25	24–36
**RK Konjuh-Živinice** (Bosnia and Herzegovina)	72–39	(Cyprus) Proodeftikos Paphos	39–15	33–24

== Round 3 ==
Teams listed first played the first leg at home. Some teams agreed to play both matches in the same venue. Bolded teams qualified into last 16.

Team 1	Agg.	Team 2	1st leg	2nd leg
RK Konjuh-Živinice (Bosnia and Herzegovina)	48–63	(Israel) **SGS Ramhat Hashron HC**	25–30	23–33
**HC Eurofarm Rabotnik** (North Macedonia)	57–47	(Lithuania) Granitas Karys Kaunas	28–24	29–23
London GD HC (United Kingdom)	37–81	(Greece) **A.E.K. Athens**	16–40	21–41
**AM Madeira Andebol SAD** (Portugal)	81–32	(Cyprus) Parnassos Strovolou	46–12	35–20
HC Gomel (Belarus)	54–63	(Iceland) **IBV Vestmannaeyjar**	27–31	27–32
KH Trepça (Kosovo)	49–75	(Romania) **AHC Potaissa Turda**	29–35	30–40
**Göztepe SK** (Turkey)	63–55	(Greece) A.C. PAOK	35–26	28–29
**HC Visé BM** (Belgium)	79–63	(Moldova) PGU-Kartina TV Tiraspol	38–31	41–32
B.S.B. Batumi (Georgia (country))	49–89	(Bosnia and Herzegovina) **HMRK Zrinjski Mostar**	17–47	32–42
**Dynamo-Victor** (Russia)	66–57	(Serbia) HC Sloga Zmartforce	37–26	29–31
**MŠK Považská Bystrica** (Slovakia)	58–50	(Montenegro) RK Lovćen	34–26	24–24
HC Vogošća Poljine Hills (Bosnia and Herzegovina)	54–65	(Norway) **FyllingenBergen**	33–35	21–30
**SKIF Krasnodar** (Russia)	57–55	(Luxembourg) HB Käerjeng	31–27	26–28
**HC Berchem** (Luxembourg)	59–45	(Serbia) ORK Samot 65	26–21	33–24
**HC ZNTU-ZAB Zaporozhye** (Ukraine)	71–46	(Montenegro) RK Mojkovac 2005	36–20	35–26
**Red Boys Differdange** (Luxembourg)	79–49	(Bulgaria) HC Dobrudja	43–23	36–26

== Last 16 ==
The draw for the last 16 round was held on Tuesday, 28 November 2017. The draw seeding pots were composed as follows:

Pot 1	Pot 2
(Greece) A.E.K. Athens; (Iceland) IBV Vestmannaeyjar; (Luxembourg) HC Berchem; (Norway) FyllingenBergen; (Portugal) AM Madeira Andebol SAD; (Romania) AHC Potaissa Turda; (Russia) Dynamo-Victor; (Russia) SKIF Krasnodar	(Belgium) HC Visé BM; (Bosnia and Herzegovina) HMRK Zrinjski Mostar; (Israel) SGS Ramhat Hashron HC; (Luxembourg) Red Boys Differdange; (North Macedonia) HC Eurofarm Rabotnik; (Slovakia) MŠK Považská Bystrica; (Turkey) Göztepe SK; (Ukraine) HC ZNTU-ZAB Zaporozhye

Teams listed first played the first leg at home. Some teams agreed to play both matches in the same venue. Bolded teams qualified into quarterfinals.

Team 1	Agg.	Team 2	1st leg	2nd leg
HC Eurofarm Rabotnik (North Macedonia)	50–61	(Norway) **FyllingenBergen**	22–25	28–36
MŠK Považská Bystrica (Slovakia)	49–53	(Portugal) **AM Madeira Andebol SAD**	25–23	24–30
**IBV Vestmannaeyjar** (Iceland)	53–46	(Israel) SGS Ramhat Hashron HC	32–25	21–21
**Dynamo-Victor** (Russia)	59–52	(Luxembourg) Red Boys Differdange	31–26	28–26
HMRK Zrinjski Mostar (Bosnia and Herzegovina)	57–67	(Russia) **SKIF Krasnodar**	27–39	28–30
**AHC Potaissa Turda** (Romania)	68–53	(Belgium) HC Visé BM	44–24	24–29
Göztepe SK (Turkey)	52–57	(Greece) **A.E.K. Athens**	29–25	23–32
HC ZNTU-ZAB Zaporozhye (Ukraine)	59–65	(Luxembourg) **HC Berchem**	29–34	30–31

== Quarterfinals ==
The draw for the quarter-final and semi-final pairings was held at the EHF Office in Vienna on 20 February at 11:00 hrs. .

The first quarter-final leg was scheduled for 24–25 March, while the second leg followed on 31 March–1 April 2018.

Team 1	Agg.	Team 2	1st leg	2nd leg
Dynamo-Victor (Russia)	48–55	(Portugal) **AM Madeira Andebol SAD**	27–27	21–28
SKIF Krasnodar (Russia)	51–66	(Iceland) **IBV Vestmannaeyjar**	23–25	28–41
**A.E.K. Athens** (Greece)	64–43	(Luxembourg) HC Berchem	32–25	32–18
**AHC Potaissa Turda** (Romania)	59–56	(Norway) FyllingenBergen	29–24	30–32

=== Matches ===
24 March 2018; 19:00	**Dynamo-Victor (Russia)**	**27–27**	**(Portugal) AM Madeira Andebol SAD**	STC Lukomore, Budyonnovsk; Attendance: 750; Referees: Jerlecki, Labun (POL)
24 March 2018; 19:00	Otrezov 9	(12–14)	Semedo 11	STC Lukomore, Budyonnovsk; Attendance: 750; Referees: Jerlecki, Labun (POL)
24 March 2018; 19:00	3× (yellow card) 2× (suspension)	Report	3× (yellow card) 4× (suspension)	STC Lukomore, Budyonnovsk; Attendance: 750; Referees: Jerlecki, Labun (POL)

31 March 2018; 17:00	**AM Madeira Andebol SAD (Portugal)**	**28–21**	**(Russia) Dynamo-Victor**	Pavilhão Desportivo, Funchal; Attendance: 700; Referees: Stokes, Bartlett (GBR)
31 March 2018; 17:00	Nekrushets 7	(13–11)	Otrezov, Volkov 8	Pavilhão Desportivo, Funchal; Attendance: 700; Referees: Stokes, Bartlett (GBR)
31 March 2018; 17:00	1× (yellow card) 1× (suspension)	Report	2× (yellow card) 4× (suspension)	Pavilhão Desportivo, Funchal; Attendance: 700; Referees: Stokes, Bartlett (GBR)

Madeira Andebol SAD won 55–48 on aggregate.

25 March 2018; 16:00	**SKIF Krasnodar (Russia)**	**23–25**	**(Iceland) IBV Vestmannaeyjar**	Olympus Arena, Krasnodar; Attendance: 800; Referees: Argyridis, Mouttas (CYP)
25 March 2018; 16:00	Koposov, Belevtsov 4	(10–15)	Sveinsson, Kristijansson 7	Olympus Arena, Krasnodar; Attendance: 800; Referees: Argyridis, Mouttas (CYP)
25 March 2018; 16:00	3× (yellow card) 2× (suspension)	Report	3× (yellow card) 2× (suspension)	Olympus Arena, Krasnodar; Attendance: 800; Referees: Argyridis, Mouttas (CYP)

31 March 2018; 15:00	**IBV Vestmannaeyjar (Iceland)**	**41–28**	**(Russia) SKIF Krasnodar**	Itrottamidstöd, Vestmannaeyjar; Attendance: 600; Referees: Weijmans, Wolbertus (NED)
31 March 2018; 15:00	Kristijansson 9	(19–15)	Nikolaenkov 9	Itrottamidstöd, Vestmannaeyjar; Attendance: 600; Referees: Weijmans, Wolbertus (NED)
31 March 2018; 15:00	3× (yellow card) 6× (suspension)	Report	3× (yellow card) 3× (suspension)	Itrottamidstöd, Vestmannaeyjar; Attendance: 600; Referees: Weijmans, Wolbertus (NED)

IBV Vestmannaeyjar won 66–51 on aggregate.

24 March 2018; 15:00	**A.E.K. Athens (Greece)**	**32–25**	**(Luxembourg) HC Berchem**	O.A.C.A. Olympic Indoor Hall, Athens; Attendance: 800; Referees: Alyev, Aghakishiyev (AZE)
24 March 2018; 15:00	Zampounis 7	(17–13)	Stupar 7	O.A.C.A. Olympic Indoor Hall, Athens; Attendance: 800; Referees: Alyev, Aghakishiyev (AZE)
24 March 2018; 15:00	3× (yellow card) 3× (suspension)	Report	3× (yellow card) 5× (suspension)	O.A.C.A. Olympic Indoor Hall, Athens; Attendance: 800; Referees: Alyev, Aghakishiyev (AZE)

31 March 2018; 20:00	**HC Berchem (Luxembourg)**	**18–32**	**(Greece) A.E.K. Athens**	Hall Omnisports de Crauthem, Berchem; Attendance: 600; Referees: Sirbu, Suponicov (MDA)
31 March 2018; 20:00	Stein 4	(8–15)	Lokken 6	Hall Omnisports de Crauthem, Berchem; Attendance: 600; Referees: Sirbu, Suponicov (MDA)
31 March 2018; 20:00	2× (yellow card) 4× (suspension)	Report	3× (yellow card) 5× (suspension) 1× (red card)	Hall Omnisports de Crauthem, Berchem; Attendance: 600; Referees: Sirbu, Suponicov (MDA)

A.E.K. Athens won 64–43 on aggregate.

24 March 2018; 18:00	**AHC Potaissa Turda (Romania)**	**29–24**	**(Norway) FyllingenBergen**	Sala de sport Gheorghe Bariţiu, Turda; Attendance: 600; Referees: Šniūrevičius, Grigalionis (LTU)
24 March 2018; 18:00	Ghiță 9	(12–11)	Mossestad 6	Sala de sport Gheorghe Bariţiu, Turda; Attendance: 600; Referees: Šniūrevičius, Grigalionis (LTU)
24 March 2018; 18:00	2× (yellow card) 1× (suspension)	Report	3× (yellow card) 1× (suspension)	Sala de sport Gheorghe Bariţiu, Turda; Attendance: 600; Referees: Šniūrevičius, Grigalionis (LTU)

2 April 2018; 17:00	**FyllingenBergen (Norway)**	**32–30**	**(Romania) AHC Potaissa Turda**	Framohallen, Bergen; Attendance: 666; Referees: Martins, Martins (POR)
2 April 2018; 17:00	Mossestad 9	(14–12)	Ghiță 11	Framohallen, Bergen; Attendance: 666; Referees: Martins, Martins (POR)
2 April 2018; 17:00	2× (yellow card) 3× (suspension)	Report	3× (yellow card) 4× (suspension)	Framohallen, Bergen; Attendance: 666; Referees: Martins, Martins (POR)

AHC Potaissa Turda won 59–56 on aggregate.

== Semifinals ==
The first semi-final legs was scheduled for 21–22 April 2018, while the second legs followed on 28–29 April 2018.

Team 1	Agg.	Team 2	1st leg	2nd leg
AM Madeira Andebol SAD (Portugal)	44–52	(Greece) **A.E.K. Athens**	21–29	23–23
IBV Vestmannaeyjar (Iceland)	55–56	(Romania) **AHC Potaissa Turda**	31–28	24–28

=== Matches ===
21 April 2018; 18:30	**AM Madeira Andebol SAD (Portugal)**	**21–29**	**(Greece) A.E.K. Athens**	Pavilhão Desportivo, Funchal; Attendance: 690; Referees: Bolic, Hurich (AUT)
21 April 2018; 18:30	Moreira 6	(6–16)	Mylonas 8	Pavilhão Desportivo, Funchal; Attendance: 690; Referees: Bolic, Hurich (AUT)
21 April 2018; 18:30	2× (yellow card) 2× (suspension)	Report	2× (yellow card) 2× (suspension)	Pavilhão Desportivo, Funchal; Attendance: 690; Referees: Bolic, Hurich (AUT)

28 April 2018; 15:00	**A.E.K. Athens (Greece)**	**23–23**	**(Portugal) AM Madeira Andebol SAD**	O.A.C.A. Olympic Indoor Hall, Athens; Attendance: 800; Referees: Kiyashko, Kiselev (RUS)
28 April 2018; 15:00	Mylonas 5	(13–12)	Semedo 7	O.A.C.A. Olympic Indoor Hall, Athens; Attendance: 800; Referees: Kiyashko, Kiselev (RUS)
28 April 2018; 15:00	2× (yellow card) 7× (suspension)	Report	2× (yellow card) 2× (suspension)	O.A.C.A. Olympic Indoor Hall, Athens; Attendance: 800; Referees: Kiyashko, Kiselev (RUS)

A.E.K. Athens won 52–44 on aggregate.

21 April 2018; 15:00	**IBV Vestmannaeyjar (Iceland)**	**31–28**	**(Romania) AHC Potaissa Turda**	Itrottamidstöd, Vestmannaeyjar; Attendance: 612; Referees: Bonifert, Oláh (HUN)
21 April 2018; 15:00	Sigurbjörnsson 13	(15–13)	Iancu 5	Itrottamidstöd, Vestmannaeyjar; Attendance: 612; Referees: Bonifert, Oláh (HUN)
21 April 2018; 15:00	3× (yellow card) 2× (suspension)	Report	2× (yellow card) 7× (suspension)	Itrottamidstöd, Vestmannaeyjar; Attendance: 612; Referees: Bonifert, Oláh (HUN)

29 April 2018; 18:00	**AHC Potaissa Turda (Romania)**	**28–24**	**(Iceland) IBV Vestmannaeyjar**	Sala de sport Gheorghe Bariţiu, Turda; Attendance: 1,000; Referees: Jorum, Kleven (NOR)
29 April 2018; 18:00	Ghiță 6	(13–11)	Sigurbjörnsson, Sveinsson 5	Sala de sport Gheorghe Bariţiu, Turda; Attendance: 1,000; Referees: Jorum, Kleven (NOR)
29 April 2018; 18:00	1× (yellow card) 5× (suspension)	Report	2× (yellow card) 2× (suspension)	Sala de sport Gheorghe Bariţiu, Turda; Attendance: 1,000; Referees: Jorum, Kleven (NOR)

AHC Potaissa Turda won 56–55 on aggregate.

== Final ==
The first leg was played on 14 May and the second was played on 20 May.

Team 1	Agg.	Team 2	1st leg	2nd leg
**AHC Potaissa Turda** (Romania)	59–49	(Greece) A.E.K. Athens	33–22	26–27

=== Matches ===
14 May 2018; 19:00	**AHC Potaissa Turda (Romania)**	**33–22**	**(Greece) A.E.K. Athens**	Horia Demian Sports Hall, Cluj-Napoca; Attendance: 3,000; Referees: Jović, Arnautović (BIH)
14 May 2018; 19:00	three players 7	(14–11)	Mylonas 7	Horia Demian Sports Hall, Cluj-Napoca; Attendance: 3,000; Referees: Jović, Arnautović (BIH)
14 May 2018; 19:00	3× (yellow card) 2× (suspension)	Report	3× (yellow card) 4× (suspension)	Horia Demian Sports Hall, Cluj-Napoca; Attendance: 3,000; Referees: Jović, Arnautović (BIH)

20 May 2018; 19:00	**A.E.K. Athens (Greece)**	**27–26**	**(Romania) AHC Potaissa Turda**	O.A.C.A. Olympic Indoor Hall, Athens; Attendance: 5,600; Referees: Andorka, Hucker (HUN)
20 May 2018; 19:00	Argyrou 7	(11–18)	Cîntec, Asoltanei 5	O.A.C.A. Olympic Indoor Hall, Athens; Attendance: 5,600; Referees: Andorka, Hucker (HUN)
20 May 2018; 19:00	4× (yellow card) 4× (suspension)	Report	2× (yellow card) 3× (suspension) 1× (red card)	O.A.C.A. Olympic Indoor Hall, Athens; Attendance: 5,600; Referees: Andorka, Hucker (HUN)

AHC Potaissa Turda won 59–49 on aggregate.

== See also ==
- 2017–18 EHF Champions League
- 2017–18 EHF Cup
- 2017–18 Women's EHF Cup
