= 2015–16 EHF Challenge Cup =

Handball tournament

EHF Challenge Cup
- 2015–16

Tournament information
- Sport: Handball
- Dates: 11 October 2015–21 May 2016
- Teams: 42

Final positions
- Champions: (Portugal) ABC/UMinho
- Runner-up: (Portugal) S.L. Benfica

The 2015–16 EHF Challenge Cup is the ongoing 19th edition of the European Handball Federation's third-tier competition for men's handball clubs, running from 11 October 2015 to 22 May 2015.

== Overview ==
=== Team allocation ===
- TH: Title holders

Round 3
(Belgium) KV Sasja HC	(Estonia) HC Kehra	(Moldova) HC Olimpus-85 USEFS	(Russia) St. Petersburg HC
(Bosnia and Herzegovina) RK Čelik	(Greece) AEK Athens	(North Macedonia) HC Prolet 62	(Serbia) Metaloplastika Šabac
(Bulgaria) HC Dobrudja	(Israel) Ramat Hashron "vitania" HC	(Netherlands) HV FIQAS/Aalsmeer	(Switzerland) Wacker Thun
(Cyprus) A.S.S. Spes	(Italy) Pallamano Pressano	(Norway) FyllingenBergen	(Turkey) BB Ankaraspor
(Czech Republic) Dukla Prague	(Kosovo) KH Prishtina	(Portugal) S.L. Benfica	
(United Kingdom) London GD Handball Club	(Luxembourg) Handball Esch	(Romania) Odorheiu Secuiesc(TH)	
Round 2
(Belgium) HC Visé BM	(Estonia) Viljandi HC	(Israel) Hapoel Ramat Gan	(Portugal) ABC/UMinho
(Bosnia and Herzegovina) HC Vogošća Poljine Hills	(Georgia (country)) HC Samtredia	(Kosovo) KH Kastrioti	(Russia) SKIF Krasnodar
(Bulgaria) Lokomotiv Varna	(Greece) A.C. Filippos Verias	(Kosovo) KH Kosova	(Serbia) Radnički Kragujevac
(United Kingdom) Leeds Hornets HC 2011	(Greece) AO Poseidon Loutrakiou	(Luxembourg) HC Berchem	(Slovakia) MSK Povazska Bystrica
(United Kingdom) Ruislip Eagles	(Iceland) ÍBV Vestmannaeyjar	(Netherlands) JMS Hurry-Up	(Turkey) Bursa Nilüfer BK

=== Round and draw dates ===
All draws held at the European Handball Federation headquarters in Vienna, Austria.

Round	Draw date	First leg	Second leg
Round 2	21 July 2015	10–11 October 2015	17–18 October 2015
Round 3	21 July 2015	21–22 November 2015	28–29 November 2015
Last 16	3 December 2015	13–14 February 2016	20–21 February 2016
Quarter-final	23 February 2016	19–20 March 2016	26–27 March 2016
Semi-finals	23 February 2016	23–24 April 2016	30 April–1 May 2016
Finals	23 February 2016	14–15 May 2016	21–22 May 2016

== Round 2 ==
Teams listed first played the first leg at home. Some teams agreed to play both matches in the same venue. Bolded teams qualified into round 3.

Team 1	Agg.	Team 2	1st leg	2nd leg
MSK Povazska Bystrica (Slovakia)	51–51	(Bosnia and Herzegovina) **HC Vogošća Poljine Hills**	29–29	22–22
Ruislip Eagles (United Kingdom)	37–97	(Portugal) **ABC/UMinho**	18–51	19–46
JMS Hurry-Up (Netherlands)	59–59	(Luxembourg) **HC Berchem**	32–30	27–29
SKIF Krasnodar (Russia)	60–61	(Greece) **A.C. Filippos Verias**	29–35	31–26
Leeds Hornets HC 2011 (United Kingdom)	47–93	(Turkey) **Bursa Nilüfer BK**	24–43	23–50
HC Samtredia (Georgia (country))	0–20	(Kosovo) **KH Kosova**	0–10	0–10
KH Kastrioti (Kosovo)	53–65	(Serbia) **Radnički Kragujevac**	27–33	26–32
Hapoel Ramat Gan (Israel)	43–56	(Iceland) **ÍBV Vestmannaeyjar**	21–25	22–31
**AO Poseidon Loutrakiou** (Greece)	49–47	(Estonia) Viljandi HC	26–23	23–24
Lokomotiv Varna (Bulgaria)	48–71	(Belgium) **HC Visé BM**	28–36	20–35

== Round 3 ==
Teams listed first played the first leg at home. Some teams agreed to play both matches in the same venue. Bolded teams qualified into last 16.

Team 1	Agg.	Team 2	1st leg	2nd leg
**Radnički Kragujevac** (Serbia)	66–39	(Bulgaria) HC Dobrudja	37 – 22	29 – 17
ÍBV Vestmannaeyjar (Iceland)	52–62	(Portugal) **S.L. Benfica**	26 – 28	26 – 34
KH Kosova (Kosovo)	50–72	(Turkey) **BB Ankaraspor**	28 – 37	22 – 35
Metaloplastika Šabac (Serbia)	51–53	(Belgium) **HC Visé BM**	29 – 25	22 – 28
HC Prolet 62 (North Macedonia)	42–51	(Belgium) **KV Sasja HC**	20 – 24	22 – 27
**Dukla Prague** (Czech Republic)	58–35	(Cyprus) A.S.S. Spes	32 – 15	26 – 20
**Handball Esch** (Luxembourg)	77–57	(Moldova) HC Olimpus-85 USEFS	37 – 30	40 – 27
**AO Poseidon Loutrakiou** (Greece)	48–48	(Italy) Pallamano Pressano	25 – 21	23 – 27
**HV FIQAS/Aalsmeer** (Netherlands)	55–54	(Israel) Ramat Hashron "vitania" HC	22 – 22	33 – 32
AEK Athens (Greece)	56–68	(Greece) **A.C. Filippos Verias**	34 – 36	22 – 32
HC Berchem (Luxembourg)	55–58	(Norway) **FyllingenBergen**	32 – 28	23 – 30
HC Vogošća Poljine Hills (Bosnia and Herzegovina)	47–50	(Russia) **St. Petersburg HC**	25 – 24	22 – 26
**Wacker Thun** (Switzerland)	79–49	(Turkey) Bursa Nilüfer BK	47 – 16	32 – 33
London GD Handball Club (United Kingdom)	42–80	(Estonia) **HC Kehra**	16 – 37	26 – 43
Odorheiu Secuiesc (Romania)	46–50	(Portugal) **ABC/UMinho**	24 – 25	22 – 25
KH Prishtina (Kosovo)	50–51	(Bosnia and Herzegovina) **RK Čelik**	29 – 28	21 – 23

== Last 16 ==
Teams listed first played the first leg at home. Some teams agreed to play both matches in the same venue. Bolded teams qualified into quarter-finals.

Team 1	Agg.	Team 2	1st leg	2nd leg
Handball Esch (Luxembourg)	48–55	(Netherlands) **HV FIQAS/Aalsmeer**	26–30	22–25
AO Poseidon Loutrakiou (Greece)	45–46	(Belgium) **KV Sasja HC**	23–24	22–22
**ABC/UMinho** (Portugal)	85–43	(Estonia) HC Kehra	40–29	45–14
RK Čelik (Bosnia and Herzegovina)	55–83	(Switzerland) **Wacker Thun**	27–42	28–41
**St. Petersburg HC** (Russia)	61–49	(Turkey) BB Ankaraspor	30–26	31–23
**S.L. Benfica** (Portugal)	57–40	(Greece) A.C. Filippos Verias	34–14	23–26
**FyllingenBergen** (Norway)	68–47	(Serbia) Radnički Kragujevac	35–28	33–19
**Dukla Prague** (Czech Republic)	68–60	(Belgium) HC Visé BM	38–27	30–33

== Quarterfinals ==
The first legs were played on 19 and 20 March and the second legs were played on 26 and 27 March 2016. Teams listed first played the first leg at home. Bolded teams qualified into semifinals.

Team 1	Agg.	Team 2	1st leg	2nd leg
**S.L. Benfica** (Portugal)	49–47	(Russia) St. Petersburg HC	24–20	25–27
**FyllingenBergen** (Norway)	55–48	(Netherlands) HV FIQAS/Aalsmeer	31–20	24–28
**ABC/UMinho** (Portugal)	64–57	(Switzerland) Wacker Thun	30–23	34–34
KV Sasja HC (Belgium)	50–56	(Czech Republic) **Dukla Prague**	27–27	23–29

== Semifinals ==
The first legs were played on 23 and 24 April and the second legs were played on 30 April and 1 May 2016. Teams listed first played the first leg at home. Bolded teams qualified into finals.

Team 1	Agg.	Team 2	1st leg	2nd leg
**S.L. Benfica** (Portugal)	64–49	(Norway) FyllingenBergen	35–22	29–27
**ABC/UMinho** (Portugal)	67–62	(Czech Republic) Dukla Prague	34–33	32–29

== Final ==
The first leg was played on 14 May 2016 and the second Leg was played on 21 May 2016. Team listed first played the first leg at home.

Team 1	Agg.	Team 2	1st leg	2nd leg
S.L. Benfica (Portugal)	51–53	(Portugal) **ABC/UMinho**	22–28	29–25

== See also ==
- 2015–16 EHF Champions League
- 2015–16 EHF Cup
