= 2019–20 EHF Challenge Cup =

EHF Challenge Cup
- 2019–20

Tournament information
- Sport: Handball
- Dates: 5 October 2019–~~24 May 2020~~
- Teams: 49
- Website: eurohandball.com

Final positions
- Champions: cancelled

Tournament statistics
- Top scorer(s): (Croatia) Damir Batinović (32 goals)

The 2019–20 EHF Challenge Cup was the 23rd edition of the European Handball Federation's third-tier competition for men's handball clubs, running from 5 October 2019 to 24 May 2020. On 24 April 2020 EHF announced that the competition would be cancelled due to COVID-19 pandemic.

== Overview ==
=== Team allocation ===
Round 3
(Romania) CSM București	(Romania) AHC Potaissa Turda	(Portugal) Madeira Andebol SAD	(Greece) A.E.K. Athens H.C.
(Russia) HC Neva SPb	(Iceland) Valur	(Luxembourg) Red Boys Differdange	(Slovakia) MŠK Považská Bystrica
(Bosnia and Herzegovina) RK Gračanica	(Norway) Halden Topphåndball	(Ukraine) Donbass	(Serbia) RK Železničar 1949
(Netherlands) JD Techniek Hurry-Up	(Israel) SGS Ramhat Hashron HC	(Turkey) Beykoz BLD SK	
Round 2
(Finland) HC Dicken	(Bulgaria) HC Dobrudja	(Belarus) Masheka Mogilev	(Lithuania) VHC Šviesa Vilnius
(Kosovo) KH Kastrioti	(Czech Republic) HCB Karviná	(United Kingdom) Olympia HC	(Cyprus) Proodeftikos Paphos
(Switzerland) BSV Bern	(Moldova) SSSCJRO-1 Tiraspol	(Italy) Cassano Magnago HC	(Austria) Bregenz Handball
(Latvia) ZRHK Tenax Dobele	(Estonia) HC Tallinn	(Azerbaijan) Mahsul HC	(Slovenia) RK Maribor Branik
(Sweden) Alingsås HK	(Faroe Islands) H71	(Greece) Pas Aeropos Edessa	(Russia) HC Victor
(Luxembourg) Handball Käerjeng	(Bosnia and Herzegovina) RK Sloga Doboj	(Norway) Drammen HK	(Ukraine) Odesa HC
(Serbia) RK Dinamo Pančevo	(Israel) Holon Yuvalim HC	(Finland) IFK Handball Helsinki	(Lithuania) Granitas Karys Kaunas
(Czech Republic) HC Dukla Prague	(United Kingdom) Livingston HC	(Luxembourg) HB Dudelange	(Bosnia and Herzegovina) HC Vogošća Poljine Hills
(Lithuania) HC Kauno Azuolas-KTU	(Czech Republic) TJ Sokol Nové Veselí		

=== Round and draw dates ===
All draws were held at the European Handball Federation headquarters in Vienna, Austria. On 25 March, the EHF announced that no matches will be played before June due to the coronavirus pandemic.

Round	Draw date	First leg	Second leg
Round 2	16 July 2019	5–6 October 2019	12–13 October 2019
Round 3	15 October 2019	16–17 November 2019	23–24 November 2019
Last 16	26 November 2019	8–9 February 2020	15–16 February 2020
Quarter-final	18 February 2020	21–22 March 2020	28–29 March 2020
Semi-finals	18 February 2020	25–26 April 2020	2–3 May 2020
Finals	5 May 2020	16–17 May 2020	23–24 May 2020

== Round 2 ==
Teams listed first played the first leg at home. The first legs were played on 5–6 October and the second legs were played on 12–13 October 2019. Some teams agreed to play both matches in the same venue.

Team 1	Agg.	Team 2	1st leg	2nd leg
KH Kastrioti (Kosovo)	49–78 ^{1}	(Czech Republic) HC Dukla Prague	26–39	23–39
BSV Bern (Switzerland)	53–52	(Serbia) RK Dinamo Pančevo	28–24	25–28
TJ Sokol Nové Veselí (Czech Republic)	81–37 ^{2}	(Bulgaria) HC Dobrudja	35–23	46–14
Drammen HK (Norway)	74–38 ^{3}	(Azerbaijan) Mahsul HC	38–16	36–22
Alingsås HK (Sweden)	72–55	(Luxembourg) Handball Käerjeng	36–24	36–31
HC Kauno Azuolas-KTU (Lithuania)	56–52 ^{4}	(Estonia) HC Tallinn	26–24	30–28
Olympia HC (United Kingdom)	26–66 ^{5}	(Ukraine) Odesa HC	9–24	17–42
H71 (Faroe Islands)	49–55 ^{6}	(Slovenia) RK Maribor Branik	25–24	24–31
Masheka Mogilev (Belarus)	51–41	(Bosnia and Herzegovina) RK Sloga Doboj	30–22	21–19
Proodeftikos Paphos (Cyprus)	35–72	(Greece) Pas Aeropos Edessa	17–35	18–37
VHC Šviesa Vilnius (Lithuania)	52–55	(Bosnia and Herzegovina) HC Vogošća Poljine Hills	27–24	25–31
HC Dicken (Finland)	82–33 ^{7}	(United Kingdom) Livingston HC	40–20	42–13
Granitas Karys Kaunas (Lithuania)	59–50 ^{8}	(Moldova) SSSCJRO-1 Tiraspol	33–24	26–26
IFK Handball Helsinki (Finland)	53–67	(Austria) Bregenz Handball	35–32	18–35
HB Dudelange (Luxembourg)	48–55	(Latvia) ZRHK Tenax Dobele	24–27	24–28
HCB Karviná (Czech Republic)	63–55 ^{9}	(Israel) Holon Yuvalim HC	31–26	32–29
HC Victor (Russia)	57–50 ^{10}	(Italy) Cassano Magnago HC	33–24	26–26

Notes

^{1} Both legs were hosted by HC Dukla Prague.
^{2} Both legs were hosted by TJ Sokol Nové Veselí.
^{3} Both legs were hosted by Drammen HK.
^{4} Both legs were hosted by HC Tallinn.
^{5} Both legs were hosted by Odesa HC.
^{6} Both legs were hosted by H71.
^{7} Both legs were hosted by Livingston HC.
^{8} Both legs were hosted by Granitas-Karys.
^{9} Both legs were hosted by HCB Karviná.
^{10} Both legs were hosted by HC Victor.

== Round 3 ==
A total of 32 teams entered the draw for the third qualification round, which was held on Tuesday, 15 October 2019. The draw seeding pots were composed as follows:

Pot 1	Pot 2
(Bosnia and Herzegovina) RK Gračanica; (Finland) HC Dicken; (Greece) A.E.K. Athens H.C.; (Iceland) Valur; (Israel) SGS Ramhat Hashron HC; (Luxembourg) Red Boys Differdange; (Netherlands) JD Techniek Hurry-Up; (Norway) Halden Topphåndball; (Portugal) Madeira Andebol SAD; (Romania) AHC Potaissa Turda; (Romania) CSM București; (Russia) HC Neva SPb; (Serbia) RK Železničar 1949; (Slovakia) MŠK Považská Bystrica; (Turkey) Beykoz BLD SK; (Ukraine) Donbass	(Austria) Bregenz Handball; (Bosnia and Herzegovina) HC Vogošća Poljine Hills; (Belarus) Masheka Mogilev; (Czech Republic) HC Dukla Prague; (Czech Republic) HCB Karviná; (Czech Republic) TJ Sokol Nové Veselí; (Greece) Pas Aeropos Edessa; (Latvia) ZRHK Tenax Dobele; (Lithuania) Granitas Karys Kaunas; (Lithuania) HC Kauno Azuolas-KTU; (Norway) Drammen HK; (Russia) HC Victor; (Slovenia) RK Maribor Branik; (Switzerland) BSV Bern; (Sweden) Alingsås HK; (Ukraine) Odesa HC

Teams listed first played the first leg at home. The first legs were played on 16–17 November and the second legs were played on 23–24 November 2019.

Team 1	Agg.	Team 2	1st leg	2nd leg
CSM București (Romania)	59–56 ^{1}	(Belarus) Masheka Mogilev	34–28	25–28
JD Techniek Hurry-Up (Netherlands)	47–69	(Sweden) Alingsås HK	21–32	26–37
HC Kauno Azuolas-KTU (Lithuania)	57–69 ^{2}	(Norway) Halden Topphåndball	28–32	29–37
Madeira Andebol SAD (Portugal)	54–43 ^{3}	(Slovenia) RK Maribor Branik	31–23	23–20
MŠK Považská Bystrica (Slovakia)	46–62	(Russia) HC Victor	27–29	19–33
Donbass (Ukraine)	53–61 ^{4}	(Switzerland) BSV Bern	26–25	27–36
HC Neva SPb (Russia)	66–39	(Greece) Pas Aeropos Edessa	35–20	31–19
ZRHK Tenax Dobele (Latvia)	67–70	(Romania) AHC Potaissa Turda	35–38	32–32
HC Dukla Prague (Czech Republic)	47–41	(Bosnia and Herzegovina) RK Gračanica	26–21	21–20
Granitas Karys Kaunas (Lithuania)	56–66 ^{5}	(Turkey) Beykoz BLD SK	22–37	34–29
Drammen HK (Norway)	64–53	(Finland) HC Dicken	32–24	32–29
SGS Ramhat Hashron HC (Israel)	63–53 ^{6}	(Ukraine) Odesa HC	39–28	24–25
RK Železničar 1949 (Serbia)	58–61	(Czech Republic) HCB Karviná	30–28	28–33
TJ Sokol Nové Veselí (Czech Republic)	46–49	(Luxembourg) Red Boys Differdange	21–22	25–27
Valur (Iceland)	62–52 ^{7}	(Austria) Bregenz Handball	31–31	31–21
HC Vogošća Poljine Hills (Bosnia and Herzegovina)	49–74 ^{8}	(Greece) A.E.K. Athens H.C.	22–41	27–33

Notes

^{1} Both legs were hosted by Masheka Mogilev.
^{2} Both legs were hosted by Halden Topphåndball.
^{3} Both legs were hosted by Madeira Andebol SAD.
^{4} Both legs were hosted by BSV Bern.
^{5} Both legs were hosted by Beykoz BLD SK.
^{6} Both legs were hosted by SGS Ramhat Hashron HC.
^{7} Both legs were hosted by Bregenz Handball.
^{8} Both legs were hosted by A.E.K. Athens H.C.

== Last 16 ==
The draw seeding pots for the Last 16 Knockout round were composed as follows: The draw for the last 16 round was held on 26 November 2019.

Pot 1	Pot 2
(Greece) A.E.K. Athens H.C.; (Iceland) Valur; (Luxembourg) Red Boys Differdange; (Portugal) Madeira Andebol SAD; (Romania) CSM București; (Romania) AHC Potaissa Turda; (Russia) HC Neva SPb; (Russia) HC Victor	(Czech Republic) HC Dukla Prague; (Czech Republic) HCB Karviná; (Israel) SGS Ramhat Hashron HC; (Norway) Halden Topphåndball; (Norway) Drammen HK; (Switzerland) BSV Bern; (Sweden) Alingsås HK; (Turkey) Beykoz BLD SK

The first leg was scheduled for 8–9 February, while the second leg followed on 15–16 February 2020.

Team 1	Agg.	Team 2	1st leg	2nd leg
A.E.K. Athens H.C. (Greece)	60–58	(Norway) Drammen HK	33–31	27–27
SGS Ramhat Hashron HC (Israel)	68–73	(Russia) HC Victor	31–31	37–42
Beykoz BLD SK (Turkey)	55–57 ^{1}	(Iceland) Valur	25–26	30–31
Halden Topphåndball (Norway)	46–45	(Russia) HC Neva SPb	23–24	23–21
Madeira Andebol SAD (Portugal)	57–60	(Czech Republic) HCB Karviná	30–27	27–33
HC Dukla Prague (Czech Republic)	66–56	(Luxembourg) Red Boys Differdange	37–24	29–32
BSV Bern (Switzerland)	68–69	(Romania) AHC Potaissa Turda	33–36	35–33
Alingsås HK (Sweden)	52–53	(Romania) CSM București	28–29	24–24

Notes

^{1} Both legs were hosted by Beykoz BLD SK.

=== Matches ===
8 February 2020; 18:00	A.E.K. Athens H.C. (Greece)	33–31	(Norway) Drammen HK	O.A.C.A. Olympic Indoor Hall, Athens; Attendance: 600; Referees: Sirbu, Serdiuc (MDA)
8 February 2020; 18:00	Buneta 9	(17–18)	Aalberg 8	O.A.C.A. Olympic Indoor Hall, Athens; Attendance: 600; Referees: Sirbu, Serdiuc (MDA)
8 February 2020; 18:00	2× (yellow card) 5× (suspension)	Report	3× (yellow card) 3× (suspension)	O.A.C.A. Olympic Indoor Hall, Athens; Attendance: 600; Referees: Sirbu, Serdiuc (MDA)

16 February 2020; 18:00	Drammen HK (Norway)	27–27	(Greece) A.E.K. Athens H.C.	Drammenshallen, Drammen; Attendance: 1,012; Referees: Barysas, Petrušis (LTU)
16 February 2020; 18:00	Horgen 10	(13–12)	Arampatzis 7	Drammenshallen, Drammen; Attendance: 1,012; Referees: Barysas, Petrušis (LTU)
16 February 2020; 18:00	2× (yellow card) 5× (suspension)	Report	1× (yellow card) 1× (suspension)	Drammenshallen, Drammen; Attendance: 1,012; Referees: Barysas, Petrušis (LTU)

A.E.K. Athens H.C. won 60–58 on aggregate.

8 February 2020; 19:00	SGS Ramhat Hashron HC (Israel)	31–31	(Russia) HC Victor	Oranim Sports hall, Ramat HaSharon; Attendance: 700; Referees: Mikelić, Paradina (CRO)
8 February 2020; 19:00	Vejin 8	(16–15)	three players 5	Oranim Sports hall, Ramat HaSharon; Attendance: 700; Referees: Mikelić, Paradina (CRO)
8 February 2020; 19:00	2× (yellow card) 2× (suspension)	Report	3× (yellow card) 2× (suspension)	Oranim Sports hall, Ramat HaSharon; Attendance: 700; Referees: Mikelić, Paradina (CRO)

15 February 2020; 15:00	HC Victor (Russia)	42–37	(Israel) SGS Ramhat Hashron HC	STC Lukomore, Budyonnovsk; Attendance: 900; Referees: Frieser, Haramul (CZE)
15 February 2020; 15:00	Mazurov 8	(20–16)	Pavlović 11	STC Lukomore, Budyonnovsk; Attendance: 900; Referees: Frieser, Haramul (CZE)
15 February 2020; 15:00	2× (yellow card) 2× (suspension)	Report	2× (yellow card) 4× (suspension)	STC Lukomore, Budyonnovsk; Attendance: 900; Referees: Frieser, Haramul (CZE)

HC Viktor won 73–68 on aggregate.

15 February 2020; 14:00	Beykoz BLD SK (Turkey)	25–26	(Iceland) Valur	Recep Sahin Köktürk Spor Kompleksi, Istanbul; Attendance: 510; Referees: Bytyqi, Kasapi (KOS)
15 February 2020; 14:00	Öztürk 6	(12–10)	Magnússon 9	Recep Sahin Köktürk Spor Kompleksi, Istanbul; Attendance: 510; Referees: Bytyqi, Kasapi (KOS)
15 February 2020; 14:00	1× (yellow card) 6× (suspension)	Report	1× (yellow card) 6× (suspension)	Recep Sahin Köktürk Spor Kompleksi, Istanbul; Attendance: 510; Referees: Bytyqi, Kasapi (KOS)

16 February 2020; 15:00	Valur (Iceland)	31–30	(Turkey) Beykoz BLD SK	Recep Sahin Köktürk Spor Kompleksi, Istanbul; Attendance: 550; Referees: Bytyqi, Kasapi (KOS)
16 February 2020; 15:00	Jonsson, Vignisson 6	(15–15)	three players 6	Recep Sahin Köktürk Spor Kompleksi, Istanbul; Attendance: 550; Referees: Bytyqi, Kasapi (KOS)
16 February 2020; 15:00	1× (yellow card) 7× (suspension)	Report	2× (yellow card) 7× (suspension)	Recep Sahin Köktürk Spor Kompleksi, Istanbul; Attendance: 550; Referees: Bytyqi, Kasapi (KOS)

Valur won 57–55 on aggregate.

9 February 2020; 16:00	Halden Topphåndball (Norway)	23–24	(Russia) HC Neva SPb	Remmenhallen, Halden; Attendance: 362; Referees: Kull, Tint (EST)
9 February 2020; 16:00	Cordt-Hansen, Schrøder 5	(9–14)	Nasyrov 5	Remmenhallen, Halden; Attendance: 362; Referees: Kull, Tint (EST)
9 February 2020; 16:00	2× (yellow card) 4× (suspension)	Report	1× (yellow card) 3× (suspension)	Remmenhallen, Halden; Attendance: 362; Referees: Kull, Tint (EST)

16 February 2020; 17:00	HC Neva SPb (Russia)	21–23	(Norway) Halden Topphåndball	Interuniversity sports center (MUSC), Saint Petersburg; Referees: Bozhinovski, Nachevski (MKD)
16 February 2020; 17:00	Nasyrov, Turaev 5	(12–15)	Molgaard, Nilsen-Nygaard 5	Interuniversity sports center (MUSC), Saint Petersburg; Referees: Bozhinovski, Nachevski (MKD)
16 February 2020; 17:00	2× (yellow card) 3× (suspension)	Report	2× (yellow card) 6× (suspension)	Interuniversity sports center (MUSC), Saint Petersburg; Referees: Bozhinovski, Nachevski (MKD)

Halden Topphåndball won 46–45 on aggregate.

9 February 2020; 19:00	Madeira Andebol SAD (Portugal)	30–27	(Czech Republic) HCB Karviná	Funchal Playing Hall, Funchal; Attendance: 400; Referees: Harabagiu, Stănescu (ROU)
9 February 2020; 19:00	Pedroso 7	(15–13)	Monczka 9	Funchal Playing Hall, Funchal; Attendance: 400; Referees: Harabagiu, Stănescu (ROU)
9 February 2020; 19:00	1× (yellow card) 3× (suspension)	Report	2× (yellow card) 5× (suspension) 1× (red card)	Funchal Playing Hall, Funchal; Attendance: 400; Referees: Harabagiu, Stănescu (ROU)

16 February 2020; 10:30	HCB Karviná (Czech Republic)	33–27	(Portugal) Madeira Andebol SAD	Sportovni hala házené STARS, Karviná; Attendance: 1,950; Referees: Rauchs, Linster (LUX)
16 February 2020; 10:30	Bruna, Monczka 6	(14–12)	three players 5	Sportovni hala házené STARS, Karviná; Attendance: 1,950; Referees: Rauchs, Linster (LUX)
16 February 2020; 10:30	2× (yellow card) 3× (suspension)	Report	3× (yellow card) 2× (suspension)	Sportovni hala házené STARS, Karviná; Attendance: 1,950; Referees: Rauchs, Linster (LUX)

HCB Karviná won 60–57 on aggregate.

9 February 2020; 19:30	HC Dukla Prague (Czech Republic)	37–24	(Luxembourg) Red Boys Differdange	DHC Sport Hall SK Slavia Praha, Prague; Attendance: 400; Referees: Loshak, Shajbakov (UKR)
9 February 2020; 19:30	Klíma, Patzel 8	(18–14)	Batinović 7	DHC Sport Hall SK Slavia Praha, Prague; Attendance: 400; Referees: Loshak, Shajbakov (UKR)
9 February 2020; 19:30	3× (yellow card) 6× (suspension)	Report	2× (yellow card) 5× (suspension)	DHC Sport Hall SK Slavia Praha, Prague; Attendance: 400; Referees: Loshak, Shajbakov (UKR)

15 February 2020; 18:00	Red Boys Differdange (Luxembourg)	32–29	(Czech Republic) HC Dukla Prague	Centre Sportif De Differdange, Oberkorn; Attendance: 500; Referees: Yovchev, Yonchev (BUL)
15 February 2020; 18:00	Batinović 9	(16–14)	Klíma 7	Centre Sportif De Differdange, Oberkorn; Attendance: 500; Referees: Yovchev, Yonchev (BUL)
15 February 2020; 18:00	2× (yellow card) 4× (suspension)	Report	3× (yellow card) 4× (suspension)	Centre Sportif De Differdange, Oberkorn; Attendance: 500; Referees: Yovchev, Yonchev (BUL)

HC Dukla Prague won 66–56 on aggregate.

9 February 2020; 17:00	BSV Bern (Switzerland)	33–36	(Romania) AHC Potaissa Turda	Mobiliar Arena, Gümlingen; Attendance: 450; Referees: Beqiri, Krasniqi (KOS)
9 February 2020; 17:00	Gerlich 7	(17–17)	four players 6	Mobiliar Arena, Gümlingen; Attendance: 450; Referees: Beqiri, Krasniqi (KOS)
9 February 2020; 17:00	4× (yellow card) 3× (suspension)	Report	3× (yellow card) 5× (suspension)	Mobiliar Arena, Gümlingen; Attendance: 450; Referees: Beqiri, Krasniqi (KOS)

16 February 2020; 17:00	AHC Potaissa Turda (Romania)	33–35	(Switzerland) BSV Bern	Sala de sport Gheorghe Bariţiu, Turda; Referees: Carmaux, Mursch (FRA)
16 February 2020; 17:00	Szőke 9	(19–18)	Gerlich 10	Sala de sport Gheorghe Bariţiu, Turda; Referees: Carmaux, Mursch (FRA)
16 February 2020; 17:00	1× (yellow card) 4× (suspension)	Report	1× (yellow card) 4× (suspension)	Sala de sport Gheorghe Bariţiu, Turda; Referees: Carmaux, Mursch (FRA)

AHC Potaissa Turda won 69–68 on aggregate.

8 February 2020; 16:00	Alingsås HK (Sweden)	28–29	(Romania) CSM București	Estrad Alingsas, Alingsas; Attendance: 2,155; Referees: Weijmans, Wolbertus (NED)
8 February 2020; 16:00	three players 5	(13–15)	Rotaru 7	Estrad Alingsas, Alingsas; Attendance: 2,155; Referees: Weijmans, Wolbertus (NED)
8 February 2020; 16:00	2× (yellow card) 3× (suspension)	Report	3× (yellow card) 5× (suspension)	Estrad Alingsas, Alingsas; Attendance: 2,155; Referees: Weijmans, Wolbertus (NED)

15 February 2020; 16:00	CSM București (Romania)	24–24	(Sweden) Alingsås HK	Dinamo Polyvalent Hall, Bucharest; Attendance: 2,000; Referees: Chrzan, Janas (POL)
15 February 2020; 16:00	Teixeira 6	(10–10)	Claar 5	Dinamo Polyvalent Hall, Bucharest; Attendance: 2,000; Referees: Chrzan, Janas (POL)
15 February 2020; 16:00	2× (yellow card) 3× (suspension)	Report	2× (yellow card) 3× (suspension)	Dinamo Polyvalent Hall, Bucharest; Attendance: 2,000; Referees: Chrzan, Janas (POL)

CSM București won 53–52 on aggregate.

== Quarterfinals ==
The draw event was held at the EHF Office in Vienna on Tuesday 18 February 2020. The draw will determine the quarter-final and also the semi-final pairings. Teams listed first will play the first leg at home. For the quarter-finals, there is no seeding as all eight teams will be drawn from the same pot one after another. There will be also no country protection applied in the draw. The semi-final draw will follow using the quarter-final pairings.

The first quarter-final leg is scheduled for 21–22 March, while the second leg will follow on 28–29 March 2020.

The European Handball Federation announced on 13 March 2020, that the Quarter-final matches will not be held as scheduled due to the ongoing developments in the spread of COVID-19 across Europe. On 24 April 2020 the matches were cancelled.

Team 1	Agg.	Team 2	1st leg	2nd leg
HC Victor (Russia)	M1	(Romania) CSM București	–	–
HCB Karviná (Czech Republic)	M2	(Czech Republic) HC Dukla Prague	–	–
A.E.K. Athens H.C. (Greece)	M3	(Romania) AHC Potaissa Turda	–	–
Halden Topphåndball (Norway)	M4	(Iceland) Valur	–	–

=== Matches ===
HC Victor (Russia)	Cancelled	(Romania) CSM București

CSM București (Romania)	Cancelled	(Russia) HC Victor

HCB Karviná (Czech Republic)	Cancelled	(Czech Republic) HC Dukla Prague

HC Dukla Prague (Czech Republic)	Cancelled	(Czech Republic) HCB Karviná

A.E.K. Athens H.C. (Greece)	Cancelled	(Romania) AHC Potaissa Turda

AHC Potaissa Turda (Romania)	Cancelled	(Greece) A.E.K. Athens H.C.

Halden Topphåndball (Norway)	Cancelled	(Iceland) Valur

Valur (Iceland)	Cancelled	(Norway) Halden Topphåndball

== Final four ==
The first semi-final legs was scheduled for 25–26 April 2020, while the second legs was supposed to follow on 2–3 May 2020, but it will be rescheduled and is foreseen to be played in an EHF FINAL4 format in one venue over two playing days. On 24 April 2020 the matches were cancelled.

=== Bracket ===
Semifinals

Final
Third place

=== Semifinals ===
TBD	Cancelled	TBD

TBD	Cancelled	TBD

=== Third place game ===
LSF1	Cancelled	LSF2

=== Final ===
WSF1	Cancelled	WSF2

== Top goalscorers ==
As of 16 February 2020

Rank	Player	Club	Goals
1	(Croatia) Damir Batinović	(Luxembourg) Red Boys Differdange	34
2	(Serbia) Milan Pavlović	(Israel) SGS Ramat Hasharon HC	30
3	(Czech Republic) Matěj Klíma	(Czech Republic) HC Dukla Prague	28
3	(Czech Republic) Marek Monczka	(Czech Republic) HCB Karviná	28
3	(Turkey) Yakup Yasar Simsar	(Turkey) Beykoz BLD SK	28

== See also ==
- 2019–20 EHF Champions League
- 2019–20 EHF Cup
