= Moldovan Handball National Division =

- Sport: Handball
- Founded: 1999
- No. of teams: 6
- Country: Moldova
- Confederation: EHF
- Most recent champion: HC Olimpus-85-USEFS
- Most titles: PGU-Kartina TV Tiraspol (14 titles)
- International cups: EHF Cup; EHF Challenge Cup
- Website: http://handball.md/

The Moldovan Divizia Națională is the name of the handball league of Moldova.

== 2016/17 Season participants ==
The following 6 clubs compete in Divizia Națională during the 2016–17 season.

Team	City	Arena
PGU-Kartina TV Tiraspol	Tiraspol	Sports Complex Sheriff
HC Olimpus-85-USEFS	Chișinău	
Dinamo-SS-4	Cioburciu	
USM-SSSH-2	Chișinău	Manej Hall
HC V.Taucci		
ULIM-Alexia Chișinău	Chișinău	

== Divizia Națională past champions ==
- 1999 : PGU-Kartina TV Tiraspol
- 2000 : PGU-Kartina TV Tiraspol (2)
- 2001 : PGU-Kartina TV Tiraspol (3)
- 2002 : PGU-Kartina TV Tiraspol (4)
- 2003 : PGU-Kartina TV Tiraspol (5)
- 2004 : PGU-Kartina TV Tiraspol (6)
- 2005 : PGU-Kartina TV Tiraspol (7)
- 2006 : PGU-Kartina TV Tiraspol (8)
- 2007 : PGU-Kartina TV Tiraspol (9)
- 2008 : PGU-Kartina TV Tiraspol (10)
- 2009 : HC Olimpus-85-USEFS
- 2010 : PGU-Kartina TV Tiraspol (11)
- 2011 : HC Olimpus-85-USEFS (2)
- 2012 : PGU-Kartina TV Tiraspol (12)
- 2013 : PGU-Kartina TV Tiraspol (13)
- 2014 : HC Olimpus-85-USEFS (3)
- 2015 : PGU-Kartina TV Tiraspol (14)
- 2016 : HC Olimpus-85-USEFS (4)
- 2017 : HC Olimpus-85-USEFS (5)
- 2018 : PGU-Kartina TV Tiraspol (15)

	Club	Titles	Year
1.	PGU-Kartina TV Tiraspol	15	1999, 2000, 2001, 2002, 2003, 2004, 2005, 2006, 2007, 2008, 2010, 2012, 2013, 2015, 2018
2.	HC Olimpus-85-USEFS	5	2009, 2011, 2014, 2016, 2017

== EHF coefficient ranking ==
For season 2017/2018, see footnote:

- 33. (35) (Bulgaria) GHR A (3.50)
- 35. (33) (Cyprus) A1 Andrón (3.00)
- 36. (38) (Moldova) Divizia Națională (2.00)
- 36. (39) (United Kingdom) Super 8 (2.00)
- 38. (30) (Lithuania) Rankinio Lyga (1.83)
