= Viktor Kireyev =

Russian handball player

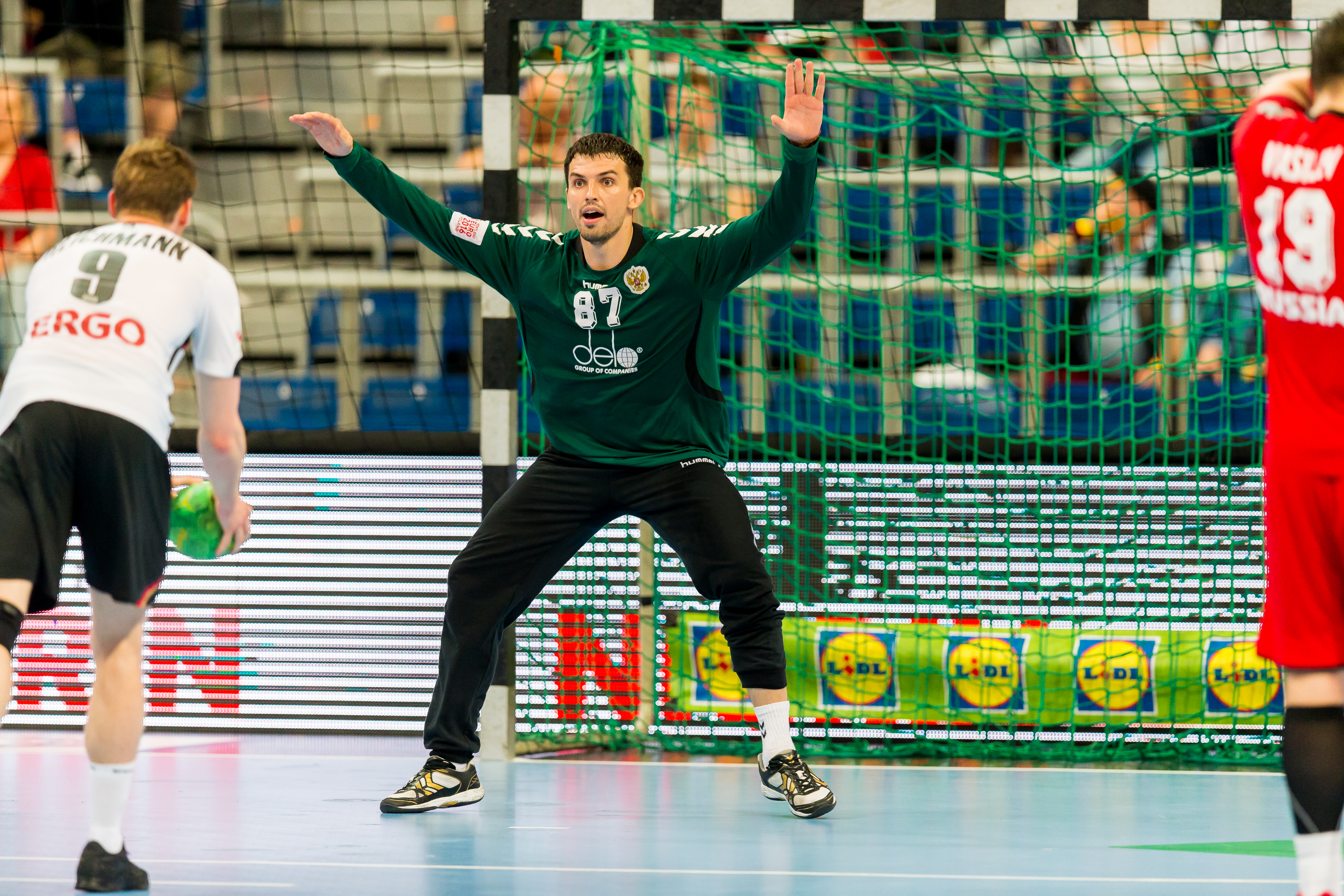
- Kireyev in 2016

Personal information
- Nationality: Russian
- Born: 5 May 1987 (age 39) Penza Oblast, Russia
- Height: 1.90 m (6 ft 3 in)

Sport
- Sport: Handball
- Position: Goalkeeper
- Current club: Zenit Saint Petersburg

Senior clubs
- Years: Team
- 2005–2014: HC Kaustik Volgograd
- 2014–2016: Neva St Petersburg
- 2016–2020: HC Motor Zaporizhzhia
- 2020–2022: HBC CSKA Moscow
- 2022–2024: Füchse Berlin
- 2024–: Zenit Saint Petersburg
National team
Years	Team	Apps	(Gls)
2015–	Russia	94	(1)
- Updated on 2 July 2024

Viktor Kireyev (born 5 May 1987) is a Russian handball player for Zenit Saint Petersburg and the Russian national team.

== Career ==
Kireyev started his career at HC Kaustik Volgograd, before joining Neva St Petersburg in 2014.

In 2016 he joined Ukrainian HC Motor Zaporizhzhia, where he won the Ukrainian championship and cup in 2017, 2018 and 2019.

In February 2020 he left the team and joined HBC CSKA Moscow. In 2022 he joined German Füchse Berlin. Here he won the EHF European League in 2022–23. In 2024 he returned to Russia to join Zenit Saint Petersburg.

== National team ==
Kireyev made his debut for the Russian national team in 2015. He represented Russia at the 2016, 2020 and 2022 European Championship and at the 2017, 2019 and 2021 World Championships.
