= Handball Esch =

Handball club in Esch, Luxembourg

- Full name: Handball Esch
- Founded: 2001
- President: Mike Hansen
- Head coach: Marc Fancelli
- League: AXA League
- 2025-2026: 4th
Home	Away

Handball Esch is a men's handball club from Esch, Luxembourg, that plays in the Luxembourgish Handball League. They were born in 2001 after the fusion between the two clubs from Esch, HB Eschois Fola and HC La Fraternelle Esch. They have won the Luxembourgish Championship 12 times, and the progenitor club HB Eschois Fola had won it 20 times.

== Titles ==
- Luxembourgish Handball League:
  - Winner: 2001-02, 2002-03, 2003-04, 2006-07, 2009-10, 2012-13, 2016-17, 2018-19, 2019-20, 2020-21, 2021-22, 2022-23
- Luxembourg Cup:
  - Winner: 2001-02, 2005-06, 2010-11, 2011-12, 2013-14, 2016-17, 2018-19, 2019-20, 2023-24, 2025-26

== European record ==
Season	Competition	Round	Club	1st leg	2nd leg	Aggregate
2012–13	Challenge Cup	R3	(Kosovo) KH Prishtina	28–24	22–31	50–55
2012–13	Challenge Cup	L16	(Serbia) RK Spartak Vojput	34–26	20–27	54–53
2012–13	Challenge Cup	QF	(Belgium) Initia Hasselt	28–26	28–27	56–53
2012–13	Challenge Cup	SF	(Romania) CSU Suceava	21–23	27–24	48–47
2012–13	Challenge Cup	Final	(Belarus) SKA Minsk	24–32	26–31	50–63
2013–14	EHF Cup	R2	(Sweden) IFK Kristianstad	19–32	28–30	47–62
2014–15	EHF Cup	R1	(Luxembourg) Handball Käerjeng	34–23	25–25	59–48
2014–15	EHF Cup	R2	(Hungary) Tatabánya KC	24–25	25–25	49–50
2015–16	Challenge Cup	R3	(Romania) HC Olimpus-85 USEFS	37–30	40–27	77–57
2015–16	Challenge Cup	L16	(Netherlands) HV FIQAS/Aalsmeer	26–30	22–25	48–55
2016–17	Challenge Cup	R3	(Israel) Ramat Hashron "S.G.S." HC	29–21	25–18	54–39
2016–17	Challenge Cup	1/8	(Romania) AHC Potaissa Turda	27–31	29–28	56–59
2017–18	EHF Cup	R1	(Norway) ØIF Arendal	24–29	25–28	50–57
2019–20	EHF Cup	R1	(Georgia (country)) B.S.B. Batumi	38–16	42–22	80–38
2019–20	EHF Cup	R2	(Poland) KS Azoty-Puławy	28–31	25–26	53–57
2020–21	European League	R1	(Switzerland) Pfadi Winterthur	30–33	Cancelled	30–33
2021–22	European Cup	R2	(Ukraine) Odesa HC	37–32	38–31	75–63
2021–22	European Cup	R3	(Norway) Bækkelagets HE	30–30	26–25	56–55
2021–22	European Cup	L16	(Czech Republic) Talent tym Plzenskeho kraje	30–34	26–29	56–63
2022–23	European Cup	R2	(Czech Republic) HC Dukla Praha	31–36	32–30	63–66
2023–24	European Cup	R2	(Faroe Islands) VÍF	30–31	28–30	58–61
2024–25	European Cup	R2	(Ukraine) HC Motor	26–32	29–46	55–78
2025–26	European Cup	R1	(Bosnia and Herzegovina) RK Vogošća	42–31	31–44	73–75
2026–27	European Cup	R1	(North Macedonia) GRK Tikveš	30–27	32–33	62–60
2026–27	European Cup	R2	(Iceland) Haukar	21–41	24–31	45–72

== Team ==
=== Current squad ===
Squad for the 2016–17 season

Goalkeepers

- (Luxembourg) Cedric Busoni
- (Luxembourg) Louis Lieser
- (Serbia) Rajko Milosevic
- (Luxembourg) Ivan Pavlovic

Wingers
RW

- (Luxembourg) Tom Krier
- (Luxembourg) Dany Scholten

LW

- (Luxembourg) Enes Agovic
- (Luxembourg) Samuel Baum
- (Luxembourg) Bruce Biren
- (France) Elias Puissegur

Line players

- (Luxembourg) Romain Labonte
- (Luxembourg) Sascha Marzadori
- (Luxembourg) Tom Quintus
- (Luxembourg) Luca Tomassini

Back players
LB

- (Croatia) Mario Jelinic
- (Luxembourg) Max Kohl
- (Luxembourg) Julien Kohn
- (Luxembourg) Martin Muller

CB

- (Luxembourg) Christian Bock
- (Luxembourg) Sacha Pulli
- (Luxembourg) Vladimir Sarac

RB

- (Luxembourg) Dimitri Mitrea
- (Greece) Alexandros Vasilakis

=== Transfers ===
Transfers for the 2025–26 season

Joining

- (Luxembourg) Felix Werdel (LW) from (France) Sarrebourg Moselle-Sud Handball

Leaving

- (Luxembourg) Yann Hippert (CB) to (Luxembourg) HB Dudelange
