= Pallamano Romagna =

- Full name: Pallamano Romagna
- Founded: 2001
- Arena: PalaCattani
- Capacity: 5000
- President: Vito Sami
- Head coach: Domenico Tassinari
- League: Serie A
- 2021-2022: 2nd in Serie A2, promoted

Pallamano Romagna is a men's handball club from Imola and Mordano, Italy, that plays in the Serie A. The club was founded in 2001, from the fusion of H.C. Imola 1973 and U.S. Mordano 1978.

== European record ==
Season	Competition	Round	Club	1st leg	2nd leg	Aggregate
2016–17	Challenge Cup	R3	(Portugal) Sporting CP	22–35	24–37	49–69

== Team ==
=== Current squad ===
Squad for the 2022–23 season

Goalkeepers

- 16 (Italy) Martino Redaelli
- 64 (France) Adrian Lombes

Wingers

- 4 (Italy) Christian Amaroli
- 6 (Italy) Tommaso Albertini
- 18 (Italy) Martin Di Domenico
- 23 (Italy) Noè Ramondini

Line players

- 10 (Egypt) Mohammed Essam
- 11 (Italy) Filippo Gollini
- 17 (Italy) Federico Nori

Back players

- 3 (Italy) Nicolò Bianconi
- 5 (Italy) Grigory Fioretti
- 7 (Italy) Gregorio Mazzanti
- 8 (Italy) Dario Chiarini
- 12 (Italy) Fabrizio Tassinari
- 13 (Italy) Claudio Lo Cicero
- 15 (Moldova) Alexandru Rotaru
- 24 (Tunisia) Amir Boukhris
- 73 (Spain) Víctor Alonso
- 88 (Croatia) Ivan Antić
