= Bulgarian GHR A =

- Sport: Handball
- Founded: 1961
- No. of teams: 11 (as of 2024–25 season)
- Country: Bulgaria
- Confederation: EHF
- Most recent champion: HC Lokomotiv Gorna Oryahovitsa (2nd title)
- Most titles: HC Lokomotiv Varna (12 titles)
- International cups: EHF Cup; EHF Challenge Cup
- Website: Official Website

The Bulgarian GHR A is the name of the handball league of Bulgaria.

== Competition format ==
The season begins with a regular season between the ten teams, then the first four teams qualifies for semifinals.

== 2024–25 Season participants ==
The following 11 clubs compete in the GHR A during the 2024–25 season.

Team	City	Arena
HC Chardafon	Gabrovo	Orlovets Hall
HC Dobrudja	Dobrich	Rusalka Hall
HC Fregata Burgas	Burgas	Nikola Stanchev Hall
HC Levski	Levski	Balgarene Hall
HC Lokomotiv GO	Gorna Oryahovitsa	OZK Arena Byala
HC NSA Sofia	Sofia	National Sports Academy
HC Osam Lovech	Lovech	Lovech Hall
HC Pirin Gotse Delchev	Gotse Delchev	Arena Nevrokop
HC Rahovets	Gorna Oryahovitsa	Nikola Petrov Hall
HC Shumen 61	Shumen	Arena Shumen
HC Spartak Varna	Varna	First Language School Hall

== GHR A past champions ==
- 1961 : VIF Dimitrov Sofia
- 1962 : VIF Dimitrov Sofia (2)
- 1963 : Akademik Sofia
- 1964 : VIF Dimitrov Sofia (3)
- 1965 : VIF Dimitrov Sofia (4)
- 1966 : SC Sportist Kremikovtzki Sofia
- 1967 : VIF Dimitrov Sofia (5)
- 1968 : SC Sportist Kremikovtzki Sofia (2)
- 1969 : Levski-Spartak Sofia
- 1970 : VIF Dimitrov Sofia (6)
- 1971 : Chernomorets Burgas
- 1972 : Lokomotiv Sofia
- 1973 : Lokomotiv Sofia (2)
- 1974 : Lokomotiv Sofia (3)
- 1975 : SC Sportist Kremikovtzki Sofia (3)
- 1976 : CSKA Sofia
- 1977 : Lokomotiv Sofia (4)
- 1978 : CSKA Sofia (2)
- 1979 : CSKA Sofia (3)
- 1980 : VIF Dimitrov Sofia (7)
- 1981 : CSKA Sofia (4)
- 1982 : VIF Dimitrov Sofia (8)
- 1983 : CSKA Sofia (5)
- 1984 : CSKA Sofia (6)
- 1985 : SC Sportist Kremikovtzki Sofia (4)
- 1986 : VIF Dimitrov Sofia (9)
- 1987 : CSKA Sofia (7)
- 1988 : VIF Dimitrov Sofia (10)
- 1989 : CSKA Sofia (8)
- 1990 : CSKA Sofia (9)
- 1991 : CSKA Sofia (10)
- 1992 : Belasitza Petrich
- 1993 : Belasitza Petrich (2)
- 1994 : Belasitza Petrich (3)
- 1995 : HC Lyulin Sofia
- 1996 : Shumen
- 1997 : HC Port Burgas
- 1998 : HC Port Burgas (2)
- 1999 : HC Port Burgas (3)
- 2000 : HC Lokomotiv Varna
- 2001 : HC Lokomotiv Varna (2)
- 2002 : HC Lokomotiv Varna (3)
- 2003 : HC Lokomotiv Varna (4)
- 2004 : HC Spartak Varna
- 2005 : HC Lokomotiv Varna (5)
- 2006 : HC Lokomotiv Varna (6)
- 2007 : HC Lokomotiv Varna (7)
- 2008 : HC Lokomotiv Varna (8)
- 2009 : SKH DIU Shumen (2)
- 2010 : SKH DIU Shumen (3)
- 2011 : SKH DIU Shumen (4)
- 2012 : HC Dobrudja
- 2013 : HC Dobrudja (2)
- 2014 : HC Fregata-Burgas
- 2015 : HC Fregata-Burgas (2)
- 2016 : HC Fregata-Burgas (3)
- 2017 : HC Lokomotiv Varna (9)
- 2018 : HC Lokomotiv Varna (10)
- 2019 : HC Lokomotiv Varna (11)
- 2020 : HC Lokomotiv Varna (12)
- 2021 : HC Shumen 61 (5)
- 2022 : HC Shumen 61 (6)
- 2023 : HC Shumen 61 (7)
- 2024 : HC Lokomotiv Gorna Oryahovitsa (1)
- 2025 : HC Lokomotiv Gorna Oryahovitsa (2)
- 2026 : HC Lokomotiv Gorna Oryahovitsa (3)

	Club	Titles	Year
1.	HC Lokomotiv Varna	12	2000, 2001, 2002, 2003, 2005, 2006, 2007, 2008, 2017, 2018, 2019, 2020
2.	VIF Dimitrov Sofia	10	1961, 1962, 1964, 1965, 1967, 1970, 1980, 1982, 1986, 1988
	CSKA Sofia	10	1976, 1978, 1979, 1981, 1983, 1984, 1987, 1989, 1990, 1991
4.	HC Shumen 61	7	1996, 2009, 2010, 2011, 2021, 2022, 2023
5.	Lokomotiv Sofia	4	1972, 1973, 1974, 1977
6.	Belasitza Petrich	3	2012, 2013, 2014
	HC Port Burgas	3	1997, 1998, 1999
	HC Fregata-Burgas	3	2014, 2015, 2016
	HC Lokomotiv Gorna Oryahovitsa	3	2024, 2025, 2026
10.	HC Dobrudja	2	2012, 2013
11.	Akademik Sofia	1	1963
	Levski-Spartak Sofia	1	1969
	Chernomorets Burgas	1	1971
	HC Lyulin Sofia	1	1995
	HC Spartak Varna	1	2004

== EHF coefficient ranking ==
For season 2017/2018, see footnote

- 32. (28) (Bosnia and Herzegovina) Premijer liga BiH (5.56)
- 33. (31) (Italy) Serie A (3.50)
- 33. (35) (Bulgaria) GHR A (3.50)
- 35. (33) (Cyprus) A1 Andrón (3.00)
- 36. (38) (Moldova) Divizia Națională (2.00)
