= HC Riviera Chișinău =

- Full name: HC Riviera Chișinău
- Arena: Manej Sport Arena
- League: National Super League
- 2015-16: 3rd

HC Riviera Chișinău, also known as Riviera-SSSH-2, is a Moldovan handball team located in Chișinău. They compete in the National Super League.

== European record ==
Season	Competition	Round	Club	1st leg	2nd leg	Aggregate
2016-17	Challenge Cup	R3	(Turkey) Tasova Yibo SK	29–32	27–33	56–65

== Team ==
=== Current squad ===
Squad for the 2016–17 season

- (Moldova) Adrian Bodrug
- (Moldova) Denis Ciciurca
- (Moldova) Serghei Costin
- (Moldova) Roman Dodica
- (Moldova) Ivan Ermuratii
- (Moldova) Adam Faqieh
- (Moldova) Artiom Gornostaev
- (Moldova) Alexei Groza
- (Moldova) Igor Grumeza
- (Moldova) Victor Iurcu
- (Moldova) Valentin Ivancenco
- (Moldova) Ilia Jucov
- (Moldova) Victor Ledeniov
- (Moldova) Danil Martev
- (Moldova) Ion Nederita
- (Moldova) Aritom Rata
- (Moldova) Dmitrii Sepelev
- (Moldova) Sergiu Suhaci
- (Moldova) Nichita Tonciu
- (Moldova) Dinu Untu
- (Moldova) Eugen Vitvitchii
