= HB Dudelange =

- Full name: Handball Dideleng
- Founded: 1974
- Arena: Centre sportif René Hartmann
- President: Fabian Cruciani
- Head coach: Erny Hoffmann
- League: Sales Lentz League
- 2015-16: 4th

HB Dudelange is a professional handball club from Dudelange, Luxembourg, that plays in the Luxembourgish Handball League. They are the most successful team in Luxembourg with 23 league titles, although they have not won a title in ten years.

== Men's team ==
=== Titles ===
- Sales Lentz League
  - Winners (23) : 1962, 1964, 1965, 1966, 1967, 1968, 1969, 1970, 1971, 1972, 1973, 1976, 1977, 1980, 1981, 1984, 1985, 1986, 1992, 2008, 2009, 2012, 2015
- Luxembourg Handball Cup
  - Winners (18) : 1962, 1964, 1966, 1967, 1968, 1969, 1970, 1972, 1973, 1977, 1979, 1981, 1985, 1986, 1988, 1991, 1999, 2013

=== European record ===
Season	Competition	Round	Club	Home	Away	Aggregate
2016–17	Challenge Cup	R3	(Israel) Hapoel Ashdod	23–28	33–27	56–55
2016–17	Challenge Cup	1/8	(Ukraine) ZNTU-ZAB Zaporizhzhia	25–27	32–27	57–54
2016–17	Challenge Cup	QF	(Romania) AHC Potaissa Turda	35–36	29–32	64–68
2018–19	Challenge Cup	R2	(Georgia (country)) IMEDI Telavi	32–25	41–13	73–38
2018–19	Challenge Cup	R3	(Russia) HC Neva SPb	16–24	12–31	28–55
2019–20	Challenge Cup	R2	(Latvia) ZRHK Tenax Dobele	24–27	24–28	48–55
2021–22	EHF European Cup	R1	(Italy) Raimond Sassari	24–23	21–29	45–52
2022–23	EHF European Cup	R1	(Turkey) Spor Toto SK	24–27	26–25	50–52
2024–25	EHF European Cup	R1	(Italy) Raimond Sassari	36–36	38–39	74–75
2025–26	EHF European Cup	R2	(Kosovo) KH Rahoveci	45–27	41–34	86–61
2025–26	EHF European Cup	R3	(Bosnia and Herzegovina) RK Izviđač	29–32	27–29	56–61
2026–27	EHF European Cup	R1	(Greece) PAOK	28–33	21–29	49–62

=== Current squad ===
Squad for the 2016–17 season

Goalkeepers

- (Luxembourg) Thierry Hensen
- (Luxembourg) Mika Herrmann
- (France) Mladen Jovicic

Wingers
RW

- (Luxembourg) Denis Della Schiava
- (Luxembourg) Tom Klohe

LW

- (Luxembourg) Kim Bosoni
- (Luxembourg) Gledis Kryeziu
- (Luxembourg) Romuald Kunda Murera
- (Luxembourg) Tommy Wirtz

Line players

- (France) Mario Anic
- (Luxembourg) Dan Mauruschatt
- (Luxembourg) Jean Christoph Schmale
- (Luxembourg) Ben Schuster

Back players
LB

- (Slovakia) Martin Hummel
- (Luxembourg) Joe Moret
- (Germany) Malvin Sebastian Patzack

CB

- (Luxembourg) Dean Joseph Beissac
- (Luxembourg) Michel Gulbicki
- (Luxembourg) Frank Hippert
- (Luxembourg) Yann Hippert

RB

- (Croatia) Josip Ilic

=== Transfers ===
Transfers for the 2025–26 season

Joining

- (Luxembourg) Yann Hippert (CB) from (Luxembourg) Handball Esch

Leaving

== Women's team ==
=== Titles ===
- Sales Lentz League
  - Winners (11) : 1974, 1975, 1976, 1977, 1988, 2010, 2011, 2013, 2014, 2015, 2016
- Luxembourg Handball Cup
  - Winners (13) : 1975, 1977, 1982, 1983, 1987, 1990, 1998, 2010, 2013, 2014, 2015, 2016, 2018

=== European record ===
Season	Competition	Round	Club	1st leg	2nd leg	Aggregate
2016–17	EHF Cup	R1	(Romania) HC Dunărea Brăila	12–43	10–36	22–79

=== Current squad ===
Squad for the 2016–17 season

Goalkeepers

- (Luxembourg) Jessica Damy
- (Poland) Malgorzata Daufeld-Kawka
- (France) Mélissa Gaspard

Wingers
RW

- (Luxembourg) Mara Odile Lisarelli
- (Luxembourg) Joy Mockel
- (Luxembourg) Tania Silvestrucci

LW

- (Luxembourg) Svenia Gambini
- (Luxembourg) Claudine Schaffener

Line players

- (Luxembourg) Corinne Damy
- (Luxembourg) Lisa Scheuer
- (Luxembourg) Kim Thies
- (Luxembourg) Fabienne Thiry

Back players
LB

- (Luxembourg) Joy Wirtz

CB

- (Luxembourg) Sharon Dickes
- (Luxembourg) Kim Wirtz

RB

- (Poland) Barbara Hajduk
- (Luxembourg) Joy Krier
- (Luxembourg) Sally Tritz
