= HKM Šaľa =

Slovak handball club

- Full name: HKM Šaľa
- Founded: 2008; 18 years ago
- Arena: Mestská športová Hall
- Capacity: 2000
- President: Jozef Klačko
- Head coach: Ján Kolesár
- League: Extraliga
- 2021-22: 7th

HKM Šaľa is a Slovak handball team located in Šaľa. Their home matches are played at the Mestská športová Hall. They compete in Extraliga.

== Accomplishments ==
- Extraliga:
  - Second place (1) : 2017
  - Third place (1) : 2016

== European record ==
| Season | Competition | Round | Club | 1st leg | 2nd leg | Aggregate |
|---|---|---|---|---|---|---|
| 2016–17 | Challenge Cup | R3 | (Kosovo) KH Kastrioti | 31–29 | 29–22 | 60–51 |
| 2016–17 | Challenge Cup | 1/8 | (Switzerland) TSV St. Otmar St. Gallen | 30–27 | 27–28 | 57–55 |
| 2016–17 | Challenge Cup | QF | (Netherlands) JMS Hurry-Up | 24–28 | 32–38 | 56–66 |

== Team ==
=== Current squad ===
Squad for the 2016–17 season

Goalkeepers

- (Montenegro) Vuko Borilovič
- (Slovakia) Luděk Fabián
- (Slovakia) Peter Repáň
- (Slovakia) Marián Žernovič

Wingers
RW

- (Serbia) Miloš Markovič
- (Slovakia) Marián Percze

LW

- (Slovakia) Šimon Michniewicz
- (Slovakia) Viktor Szapu

Line players

- (Slovakia) Peter Dudaš
- (Slovakia) Tomáš Mažár

Back players
LB

- (Slovakia) Vladimír Guzy
- (Slovakia) Peter Krokavec
- (Slovakia) František Šulc

CB

- (Slovakia) Juraj Janíček
- (Slovakia) Patrik Krok
- (Ukraine) Mykola Melnyk

RB

- (Slovakia) Marián Maguška
- (Slovakia) Pavol Polakovič
