= 2016–17 EHF Challenge Cup =

EHF Challenge Cup
- 2016–17

Tournament information
- Sport: Handball
- Dates: 19 November 2016–27 May 2017
- Teams: 32

Final positions
- Champions: (Portugal) Sporting CP
- Runner-up: (Romania) Potaissa Turda

Tournament statistics
- Top scorer: (Romania) Georgică Cîntec (48 goals)

The 2016–17 EHF Challenge Cup was the 20th edition of the European Handball Federation's third-tier competition for men's handball clubs, which was won by Sporting CP running from 19 November 2016 to 27 May 2017.

== Overview ==
=== Team allocation ===
- TH: Title holders

Round 3
(Belgium) HC Visé BM	(Bosnia and Herzegovina) RK Vogošća Poljine Hills	(Bulgaria) HC Lokomotiv Varna	(Bulgaria) HC Dobrudja
(Cyprus) A.S.S. Spes	(United Kingdom) Cambridge HC	(Greece) A.C. Doukas	(Greece) IEK Xini Dikeas
(Iceland) Valur	(Israel) Hapoel Ashdod	(Israel) Ramat Hashron "S.G.S." HC	(Italy) A.S.D. Romagna Handball
(Kosovo) KH Kastrioti	(Lithuania) Klaipeda Dragunas	(Luxembourg) Handball Esch	(Luxembourg) HB Dudelange
(Moldova) PGU-Kartina TV Tiraspol	(Moldova) Riviera-SSSH-2	(North Macedonia) RK Pelister	(Montenegro) RK Partizan 1949
(Netherlands) JMS Hurry-Up	(Norway) Haslum Handballklubb	(Portugal) Sporting CP	(Romania) AHC Potaissa Turda
(Serbia) RK Sloga Požega	(Serbia) RK Partizan	(Switzerland) TSV St. Otmar St. Gallen	(Slovakia) HKM Sala
(Slovakia) MSK Povazska Bystrica	(Turkey) Göztepe SK	(Turkey) Tasova Yibo SK	(Ukraine) HC ZNTU-ZAB Zaporizhzhia

=== Round and draw dates ===
All draws held at the European Handball Federation headquarters in Vienna, Austria.

Round	Draw date	First leg	Second leg
Round 3	19 July 2016	19–20 November 2016	26–27 November 2016
Last 16	29 November 2016	18–19 February 2017	25–26 February 2017
Quarter-final	23 February 2017	19–20 March 2017	26–27 March 2017
Semi-finals	23 February 2017	23–24 April 2017	30 April–1 May 2017
Finals	23 February 2017	14–15 May 2017	21–22 May 2017

== Round 3 ==
Teams listed first played the first leg at home. Some teams agreed to play both matches in the same venue. Bolded teams qualified into last 16.

Team 1	Agg.	Team 2	1st leg	2nd leg
**Sporting CP** (Portugal)	69–49	(Italy) A.S.D. Romagna Handball	32–25	37–24
**AHC Potaissa Turda** (Romania)	75–42	(Bulgaria) HC Dobrudja	32–23	43–19
**HB Dudelange** (Luxembourg)	56–55	(Israel) Hapoel Ashdod	23–28	33–27
**RK Sloga Požega** (Serbia)	50–47	(Belgium) HC Visé BM	26–21	24–26
PGU-Kartina TV Tiraspol (Moldova)	51–58	(Ukraine) **HC ZNTU-ZAB Zaporizhzhia**	23–27	28–31
Ramat Hashron "S.G.S." HC (Israel)	39–54	(Luxembourg) **Handball Esch**	21–29	18–25
**RK Partizan 1949** (Montenegro)	49–43	(Cyprus) A.S.S. Spes	27–21	22–22
RK Partizan (Serbia)	52–59	(Slovakia) **MSK Povazska Bystrica**	23–31	29–28
**Valur** (Iceland)	56–49	(Norway) Haslum Handballklubb	31–24	25–25
IEK Xini Dikeas (Greece)	43–45	(Greece) **A.C. Doukas**	27–21	16–24
KH Kastrioti (Kosovo)	51–60	(Slovakia) **HKM Sala**	29–31	22–29
Göztepe SK (Turkey)	47–48	(Netherlands) **JMS Hurry-Up**	22–20	25–28
Klaipeda Dragunas (Lithuania)	52–63	(Switzerland) **TSV St. Otmar St. Gallen**	28–35	24–28
**Tasova Yibo SK** (Turkey)	65–56	(Moldova) Riviera-SSSH-2	32–29	33–27
Cambridge HC (United Kingdom)	47–76	(Bulgaria) **HC Lokomotiv Varna**	22–36	25–40
**RK Pelister** (North Macedonia)	49–48	(Bosnia and Herzegovina) RK Vogošća Poljine Hills	21–23	28–25

== Last 16 ==
Teams listed first played the first leg at home. Some teams agreed to play both matches in the same venue. Bolded teams qualified into quarter-finals.

Team 1	Agg.	Team 2	1st leg	2nd leg
Tasova Yibo SK (Turkey)	58–66	(Greece) **A.C. Doukas**	28–32	30–34
**Valur** (Iceland)	45–45	(Montenegro) RK Partizan 1949	21–21	24–24
Handball Esch (Luxembourg)	56–59	(Romania) **AHC Potaissa Turda**	27–31	29–28
HC ZNTU-ZAB Zaporizhzhia (Ukraine)	54–57	(Luxembourg) **HB Dudelange**	27–32	27–25
**HKM Sala** (Slovakia)	57–55	(Switzerland) TSV St. Otmar St. Gallen	30–27	27–28
RK Pelister (North Macedonia)	44–66	(Portugal) **Sporting CP**	18–32	26–34
MSK Povazska Bystrica (Slovakia)	49–51	(Netherlands) **JMS Hurry-Up**	30–19	19–32
**RK Sloga Požega** (Serbia)	58–44	(Bulgaria) HC Lokomotiv Varna	35–22	23–22

== Quarterfinals ==
Team 1	Agg.	Team 2	1st leg	2nd leg
RK Sloga Požega (Serbia)	53–59	(Iceland) **Valur**	27–30	26–29
**AHC Potaissa Turda** (Romania)	68–64	(Luxembourg) HB Dudelange	32–29	36–35
A.C. Doukas (Greece)	48–62	(Portugal) **Sporting CP**	23–35	25–27
**JMS Hurry-Up** (Netherlands)	66–56	(Slovakia) HKM Sala	28–24	38–32

== Semifinals ==
Team 1	Agg.	Team 2	1st leg	2nd leg
JMS Hurry-Up (Netherlands)	41–69	(Portugal) **Sporting CP**	27–32	14–37
Valur (Iceland)	53–54	(Romania) **AHC Potaissa Turda**	30–22	23–32

== Final ==
Team 1	Agg.	Team 2	1st leg	2nd leg
**Sporting CP** (Portugal)	67–52	(Romania) AHC Potaissa Turda	37–28	30–24

== See also ==
- 2016–17 EHF Champions League
- 2016–17 EHF Cup
