= RK Sloga Požega =

Serbian handball team

- Full name: RK Sloga Požega
- Founded: 1960
- League: Serbian Handball Super League
- 2016–17: 5th

RK Sloga Požega is a Serbian handball team located in Požega. They compete in Serbian Handball Super League.

== European record ==
Season	Competition	Round	Club	1st leg	2nd leg	Aggregate
2016–17	Challenge Cup	R3	(Belgium) HC Visé BM	26–21	24–26	50–47
2016–17	Challenge Cup	1/8	(Bulgaria) HC Lokomotiv Varna	35–22	23–22	58–44
2016–17	Challenge Cup	QF	(Iceland) Valur	27–30	26–29	53–59

== Team ==
=== Current squad ===
Squad for the 2016–17 season

Goalkeepers

- (Serbia) Branko Dimitrijevic
- (Serbia) Janko Gemaljevic
- (Serbia) Borislav Vladisavljevic

Wingers
RW

- (Serbia) Milan Knezevic
- (Serbia) Miroslav Marjanovic

LW

- (Serbia) Djordje Spasic
- (Serbia) Ivan Voksi

Line players

- (Serbia) Zeljko Jacimovic
- (Serbia) Nikolas Jestrovic

Back players

- (Serbia) Nemanja Gojkovic
- (Serbia) Dragoslav Ilic
- (Serbia) Ljubomir Janicijevic
- (Serbia) Mladen Krsmancic
- (Serbia) Darko Milenkovic
- (Serbia) Aleksandar Milicevic
- (Serbia) Antonije Pavic
- (Serbia) Milan Pavlovic
- (Serbia) Predrag Rodic
- (Serbia) Vuk Stevanovic
- (Serbia) Filip Stojcic
