= Handball Club Holon =

Israeli handball team

מועדון כדוריד חולון Handball Club Holon
- Full name: Handball Club Yuvalim Holon
- Short name: HC Holon
- Founded: 1972
- Arena: Katzir Holon
- Capacity: 700
- Head coach: Nissim Falach
- League: Winner League
- Club colours
Home	Away

Handball Club Holon (Hebrew: מועדון כדוריד חולון), is a professional handball club from the city of Holon, Israel. They compete in the Israeli Handball League, within the Israeli first division.

Location of Handball Club Holon

== History ==
Handball Club Holon was founded in 1972. The club's biggest success in the 2018/19 season was the Israeli Cup final. At the end of a tight and tense match, the team lost to Maccabi Rishon LeZion and finished second in the cup.

== Crest, colours, supporters ==
=== Kits ===
HOME
2021–22	2022–23

AWAY
2022–23	2023–24

== Team ==
=== Current squad ===
Squad for the 2023–24 season

Handball Club Holon

Goalkeepers

- 1 (Israel) Ziv Kadan
- 16 (Israel) Moshe Elimelech
- 89 (Israel) Shon Morohov

Left Wingers

- 9 (Israel) Amit Reinsberg
- 10 (Israel) Avraham Aviran Yosef

Right Wingers

- 3 (Israel) Aharon Levi
- 5 (Israel) Dor Moshe
- 15 (Israel) Rif Cohen
- 96 (Israel) Hen Livgot

Line Players

- 25 (Israel) Or Refael Maman

Central Backs

- 7 (Israel) Or Refael Levi
- 8 (Israel) Aviad Ben Ziman
- 99 (Israel) Nadav Malachi

Left Backs

- 34 (Israel) Loic Bakasu Bibange
- 44 (Nigeria) Philipp Kalu

Right Backs

- 17 (Nigeria) Patrick Obinna Nwaiwu
- 30 (Israel) Naor Cohen
- 55 (Israel) Itay Ben Yaakov

=== Technical staff ===
- Head Coach: (Israel) Nissim Falach

=== Transfers ===
Transfers for the 2026–27 season

Joining

- (Israel) Nadav Cohen (RW) from (Germany) VfL Lübeck-Schwartau

Leaving

=== Transfer History ===
Transfers for the 2023–24 season

Joining

- (Israel) Moshe Elimelech (GK) from (Israel) Maccabi Rishon LeZion
- (Israel) Shon Morohov (GK) from (Israel) Hapoel Ashdod
- (Israel) Aviad Ben Ziman (CB) from (Israel) HC Ramat HaSharon

Leaving

- (Serbia) Miloš Rajičić (GK)
- (Israel) Roi Avraham Solomon (LB) to (Israel) Hapoel Ashdod
- (Israel) Shon Meir Solomon (RB) to (Israel) Hapoel Ashdod
- (Israel) Or Cnani (GK) to (Israel) HC Nes Ziona
- (Israel) Amir Shneider (RW)
- (Israel) Lidor Peso (LB)
- (Israel) Nitzan Shamai (LP)

== EHF ranking ==
As of 5/12/2025

Rank	Team	Points
115	(Luxembourg) Handball Esch	39
116	(France) Pays d'Aix Université	38
117	(Kosovo) KH Rahoveci	38
118	(Israel) Handball Club Holon	38
119	(Latvia) ZRHK Dobele	36
120	(Sweden) Alingsås HK	36
121	(Bosnia and Herzegovina) RK Vogošća	35

== Former club members ==
=== Notable former players ===
- (Israel) Hen Livgot (2018–2020, 2023–)
