= Amasya Taşova YİBO SK =

Handball club from Amasya, Turkey

- Full name: Amasya Taşova YİBO Spor Kulübü
- Founded: 2008; 17 years ago
- Dissolved: 2018; 7 years ago
- Arena: Taşova Spor Salonu
- Capacity: 500
- League: Turkish Handball Super League; EHF Challenge Cup
- 2015–16: 4th Semifinalists

Amasya Taşova YİBO SK was a professional handball club from Amasya, Turkey. The club plays their home matches at Taşova Spor Salonu. The club closed in 2018.

== European record ==
Season	Competition	Round	Club	1st leg	2nd leg	Aggregate
2016–17	Challenge Cup	R3	(Moldova) Riviera-SSSH-2	32–29	33–27	65–56
2016–17	Challenge Cup	1/8	(Greece) A.C. Doukas	28–32	30–34	58–66

== Current squad ==
Squad for the 2016–17 season

Goalkeepers

- (Turkey) Yasin Caliskal
- (Serbia) Stanko Kljajić
- (Ukraine) Yevgen Sapun

Right Wingers

- (Turkey) Cetin Celik

Left Wingers

- (Turkey) Alparslan Aslantürk
- (Turkey) Muhammet Bozkurt
- (Turkey) Samet Kanberoglu

Line players

- (Serbia) Đuro Karanović
- (Turkey) Adnan Tayfur

Left Backs

- (Ukraine) Oleksandr Petrov
- (Ukraine) Viktor Shkrobanets
- (Turkey) Ekrem Tüfekcidere

Central Backs

- (Serbia) Vladimir Đurić
- (Ukraine) Oleksandr Yuzhbabenko

Right Backs

- (Slovakia) Maros Balaz
- (Ukraine) Maksym Byegal
