= HC Lokomotiv Varna =

Bulgarian handball team

Lokomotiv Varna
- Full name: Хандбален Клуб Локомотив Варна (Handball Club Lokomotiv Varna)
- Nickname(s): Железничарите (The Railwayman)
- Short name: Локо Варна (Loko Varna)
- Founded: 1963
- Arena: Vladislav Hall, Varna
- League: A Group
- 2019-20: 1st - Champion
- Club colours
Home	Away

HC Lokomotiv Varna is a Bulgarian handball team based in Varna. Lokomotiv Metalex Bild has been a Champion of Bulgaria 11 times since the year 2000, which is the most of any Bulgarian club. They have also won the Bulgarian Cup 11 times.

== History ==
Handball club Lokomotiv – Varna was established in 1963 with Mr. Georgi Velikov as a president of the club and its first coach the honoured master of sports Dimitar Nushev. Mr. Alexander Evtimov was elected as a president of Handball club "Lokomotiv Nadin" in 2003. Mrs. Rumyana Radusheva has been a president of Handball club "Lokomotiv Metalex Build" since 2004.

They were the first Bulgarian champion in beach handball in 1997.

Lokomotiv Varna currently holds the record for the longest unbeaten streak in the history of handball with 73 consecutive wins during period from June 4, 2016 till nowadays.

== Trophies ==
- Bulgarian Championship (11): 2000, 2001, 2002, 2003, 2005, 2007, 2017, 2018, 2019, 2020
- Bulgarian Cup (11): 1998, 2000, 2005, 2006, 2007, 2016, 2017, 2018, 2019
- Bulgarian Beach Handball Championship (5): From 1998 until 2007 was 5 times

== European record ==
Season	Competition	Round	Club	1st leg	2nd leg	Aggregate
2016–17	Challenge Cup	R3	(United Kingdom) Cambridge HC	36–22	40–25	76–47
2016–17	Challenge Cup	1/8	(Serbia) RK Sloga Požega	22–35	22–23	44–58

== Current squad 2008/2009 ==
The numbers are established according to the official website: www.lokomotiv-mb.com

- Men's
- 1 (Bulgaria) Ivan Ivanov
- 2 (Bulgaria) Borislav Borisov
- 3 (Bulgaria) Svetoslav Bozhkov
- 5 (Bulgaria) Chavdar Chernev
- 11 (Bulgaria) Pencho Rachev
- 12 (Bulgaria) Ivan Ivanov
- 13 (Bulgaria) Borislav Kobakov
- 14 (Bulgaria) Miroslav Vladkov
- 16 (Bulgaria) Branimir Balchev
- 17 (Bulgaria) Teodor Dobrev
- 18 (Bulgaria) Georgi Atanasov
- 19 (Bulgaria) Stanimir Kazakov
- 22 (Bulgaria) Nikola Karastoyanov
- 24 (Bulgaria) Tanser Usnu

Coach: Hristo Yordanov

- Women's
- 1 (Bulgaria) Stanislava Stoyanova
- 2 (Bulgaria) Lyudmila Gareva
- 3 (Bulgaria) Dimka Predyova
- 5 (Bulgaria) Svetlana Nikolaeva
- 11 (Bulgaria) Veselina Miteva
- 12 (Bulgaria) Asia Rifad
- 13 (Bulgaria) Stoyanka Kelesheva
- 15 (Moldova) Lyudmila Gaydraga
- 16 (Bulgaria) Kremena Kupenova
- 17 (Bulgaria) Desislava Krasteva
- 18 (Bulgaria) Stefka Agova
- 20 (Moldova) Tatyana Alifanova
- 55 (Bulgaria) Veronika Hristova
- 77 (Bulgaria) Kamelia Dobrancheva

Coach: Zdravko Petrov

== Stadium information ==
- Name: - Kongresna
- City: - Varna
- Capacity: - 6,000
