= Elias António =

Angolan handball player

Personal information
- Full name: Elias Nogueira António
- Nationality: Angolan
- Born: 30 March 1987 (age 39) Luanda, Angola
- Height: 1.70 m (5 ft 7 in)

Sport
- Sport: Handball
- Position: Left wing
- Current club: Madeira Andebol SAD
- Number: 21
National team
Years	Team	Apps	(Gls)
–	Angola	24	(38)
Medal record
African Championship
Bronze medal – third place	Egypt 2016

Elias Nogueira António (born 30 May 1987) is an Angolan handball player for Madeira Andebol SAD and the Angolan national team.

He participated at the 2017 World Men's Handball Championship.
