= Crauthem =

Town in Luxembourg

Coordinates: 49°32′N 6°09′E

Wayside cross in Crauthem

Crauthem (Luxembourgish: Krautem, German: Krauthem) is a town in the commune of Roeser, in southern Luxembourg. As of September 2026, the town has a population of 1,698.

Xavier Bettel, the Prime Minister of Luxembourg from 2013 to 2023, spent his childhood in Crauthem.
