= Cambridge HC =

English handball club

- Full name: Cambridge Handball Club
- Arena: Chesterton Sports Centre
- League: Super 8
- 2015-2016: 3rd

Cambridge HC is a handball club from Cambridge, England, which has a men's team in the Super 8 and a women's team in Women's Super 8

== European record ==
Season	Competition	Round	Club	1st leg	2nd leg	Aggregate
2016-17	Challenge Cup	R3	(Bulgaria) HC Lokomotiv Varna	22–36	25–40	47–76

== Team ==
=== Current squad ===
Squad for the 2016–17 season

Goalkeepers

- (United Kingdom) Graham Jack
- (France) Pierre Larraufie

Wingers
RW

- (United Kingdom) Tobias Barber
- (United Kingdom) Kevin Guy
- (France) Thibaut Page

LW

- (Portugal) Antonio Pedro Albuquerque
- (United Kingdom)

Rickie Bailey

- (United Kingdom) Oliver Holway

Line players

- (Spain) Alejandro Garcia Costa
- (Hungary) Levente Kovacs
- (France) Jean-Daniel Malcor

Back players
LB

- (Hungary) Zsolt Majoros

CB

- (Spain) Jose Ballester Beltran
- (Portugal) Francisco De Almeida Seco
- (France) Nicolas Martin

RB

- (Italy) Fernando Gicci
- (Germany) Jürgen Harter
- (Germany) Florian Ströhl
