= HC Ramat HaSharon =

Ramat Hasharon HC
- Full name: Ramat Hasharon HC
- Arena: Oranim
- President: Abi Shlon
- Head coach: Reuben Islovski
- League: Ligat Ha'Al
- 2015-2016: 5th

Ramat Hasharon HC, also known as Ramat Hasharon "S.G.S." HC is a men's handball club from Ramat Hasharon, Israel, that plays in Ligat Ha'Al.

== European record ==
Season	Competition	Round	Club	1st leg	2nd leg	Aggregate
2016-17	Challenge Cup	R3	(Luxembourg) Handball Esch	21–29	18–25	39–54
2017–18	Challenge Cup	R3	(Bosnia and Herzegovina) RK Konjuh-Živinice	33–23	30–25	63–48
2017–18	Challenge Cup	L16	(Iceland) IBV Vestmannaeyjar	21–21	25–32	46–53
2018–19	Challenge Cup	R3	(Ukraine) HC ZNTU-ZAB Zaporozhye	27–32	33–25	60–57
2018–19	Challenge Cup	L16	(Greece) AEK Athens	28–34	25–35	53–69
2019–20	Challenge Cup	R3	(Ukraine) Odesa HC	39–28	24–25	63–53
2019–20	Challenge Cup	L16	(Russia) HC Victor	31–31	37–42	68–73
2022–23	European Cup	R2	(Switzerland) Pfadi Winterthur	30–34	31–24	61–58
2022–23	European Cup	R3	(Czech Republic) Talent tym Plzenskeho kraje	39–28	34–33	73–61
2022–23	European Cup	L16	(Sweden) Alingsås HK	21–31	31–38	52–69
2026–27	European Cup	R2	(Greece) Ionikos AC NF	28–26	31–25	59–51
2026–27	European Cup	R3	(Greece) PAOK	–	–	–

== Team ==
=== Current squad ===
Squad for the 2019–20 season

Goalkeepers

(Israel) 1. Gil Yaakov
(Israel) 12. Peleg Daniel
(Israel) 55. Yahav Shamir
(Israel) 99. Shahar Tsarfati

Pivot

(Israel) 3. Daniel Shkalim
(Israel) 19. Yossi Appo

Winger

(Israel) 7. Amit Yehuda Gal
(Israel) 9. Alon Etzion-Oberman
(Israel) 10. Gil Pomerantz
(Israel) 34. Amit Motola

Back players

(Serbia) 5. Predrag Vejin
(Israel) 17.Ori lusternik
(Serbia) 8. Djordje Djekic
(Israel) 11. Itay Turkenitz
(Serbia) 12. Milan Pavlovic
(Israel) 20. Elad Kappon
(Israel) 23. Itay Hassidim
(Israel) 24. Nadav Haviv
(Israel) 63. Guy Yarimi

=== Transfers ===
Transfers for the 2025–26 season

Joining

- (Serbia) Mihajlo Radojković (RB) from (Serbia) RK Partizan

Leaving

- (Montenegro) Risto Vujačić (RB) to (Romania) SCM Politehnica Timișoara
