= PGU Tiraspol =

Moldovan handball team

- Full name: PGU-Kartina TV Tiraspol
- Arena: Sports Complex Sheriff
- League: National Super League
- 2015-16: 2nd

PGU Tiraspol, also known as PGU-Kartina TV Tiraspol due to sponsorship reasons, is a Moldovan handball team located in Tiraspol. They compete in the National Super League. They won their last championship in 2015.

== Titles ==
- National Super League
  - Winners (14): 1999, 2000, 2001, 2002, 2003, 2004, 2005, 2006, 2007, 2008, 2010, 2012, 2013, 2015

== European record ==
Season	Competition	Round	Club	1st leg	2nd leg	Aggregate
2016-17	Challenge Cup	R3	(Ukraine) HC ZNTU-ZAB Zaporizhzhia	23–27	28–31	51–58

== Team ==
=== Current squad ===
Squad for the 2016–17 season

Goalkeepers

- (Moldova) Oleg Mamcov
- (Moldova) Denis Potapchin
- (Moldova) Ion Saharnean

Wingers
RW

- (Moldova) Iaroslav Vitehovschi

LW

- (Moldova) Serghei Cusnir
- (Moldova) Oleg Mohovic

Line players

- (Ukraine) Serhii Petrychenko
- (Moldova) Oleh Puzyrevskyi
- (Moldova) Vladislav Turcan

Back players
LB

- (Moldova) Vladislav Bulgar
- (Moldova) Alexandr Lupasco

CB

- (Moldova) Serghei Bogacic
- (Moldova) Vladimir Brizitchii
- (Ukraine) Oleksandr Udovychenko

RB

- (Moldova) Serghei Boldirev
- (Moldova) Maxim Slagoda
