= HC Olimpus-85 Chișinău =

- Full name: HC Olimpus-85-USEFS Chișinău
- Founded: 1985
- League: National Super League
- 2015-16: 1st

HC Olimpus-85-USEFS is a Moldovan handball team located in Chișinău. They compete in the National Super League.

== Titles ==
- National Super League
  - Winners (4): 2010, 2011, 2014, 2016
  - Runner-Up (8): 2001, 2002, 2003, 2004, 2005, 2006, 2007, 2008

== European record ==
Season	Competition	Round	Club	1st leg	2nd leg	Aggregate
2016–17	EHF Cup	R1	(Ukraine) ZTR Zaporizhia	28–37	21–40	49–77

== Team ==
=== Current squad ===
Squad for the 2016–17 season

Goalkeepers

- (Moldova) Andrei Sapojnicov
- (Moldova) Victor Serdiuc
- (Ukraine) Dmytro Veremchuk

Wingers
RW

- (Moldova) Igor Ilcovici-Hodus

LW

- (Moldova) Andrei Cojocaru
- (Moldova) Artiom Juravliov
- (Moldova) Alexandru Ous
- (Moldova) Alexandr Selemet

Line players

- (Moldova) Daniel Furtuna
- (Moldova) Andrei Minciuc
- (Moldova) Denis Sicaciov

Back players
LB

- (Moldova) Dmitri Bobruico
- (Moldova) Alexandr Boret
- (Moldova) Alexei Liubinskii
- (Ukraine) Oleksandr Orliohlo
- (Moldova) Alexandru Pervanciuc
- (Moldova) Nichita Savcenco
- (Ukraine) Rodion Zvenihorodskyi

CB

- (Moldova) Serghei Nazarco
- (Moldova) Calin Oprea
- (Moldova) Alexei Pervanciuc
- (Moldova) Maxim Plesca

RB

- (Ukraine) Artem Mogilka
- (Moldova) Maxim Sipulin
