= HC Dobrudja =

- Full name: Handball Club Dobrudja Dobrich
- Founded: 1959
- Arena: Rusalka
- League: GHR A
- 2015-2016: 2nd

HC Dobrudja is a men's handball club from Dobrich, Bulgaria, that plays in the GHR A, the highest level handball league in Bulgaria.

== European record ==
Season	Competition	Round	Club	1st leg	2nd leg	Aggregate
2016-17	Challenge Cup	R3	(Romania) AHC Potaissa Turda	23–32	19–43	42–75

== Team ==
=== Current squad ===
Squad for the 2016–17 season

Goalkeepers

- (Bulgaria) Emil Ivanov
- (Bulgaria) Nikolay Kostadinov
- (Bulgaria) Ivaylo Kostov

Wingers
RW

- (Bulgaria) Aleksandar Dimitrov
- (Bulgaria) Stefan Eftimov
- (Bulgaria) Stiliyan Stoyanov

LW

- (Bulgaria) Georgi Mihaylov
- (Bulgaria) Mihail Neychev
- (Bulgaria) Miroslav Simeonov

Line players

- (Bulgaria) Ilyan Denev
- (Bulgaria) Donislav Dimitrov

Back players
LB

- (Bulgaria) Iliyan Iliev
- (Bulgaria) Krasimir Koev
- (Bulgaria) Marin Sarandev
- (Bulgaria) Dzhoshkun Yakubov

CB

- (Bulgaria) Yordan Mihailov
- (Bulgaria) Yavor Nikolov
- (Bulgaria) Anton Petrov

RB

- (Bulgaria) Krasen Kraychev
- (Bulgaria) Svetoslav Nedev
- (Bulgaria) Zlatan Petrov
