= 2024–25 EHF European Cup =

Handball tournament in Europe

EHF European Cup
- 2024–25
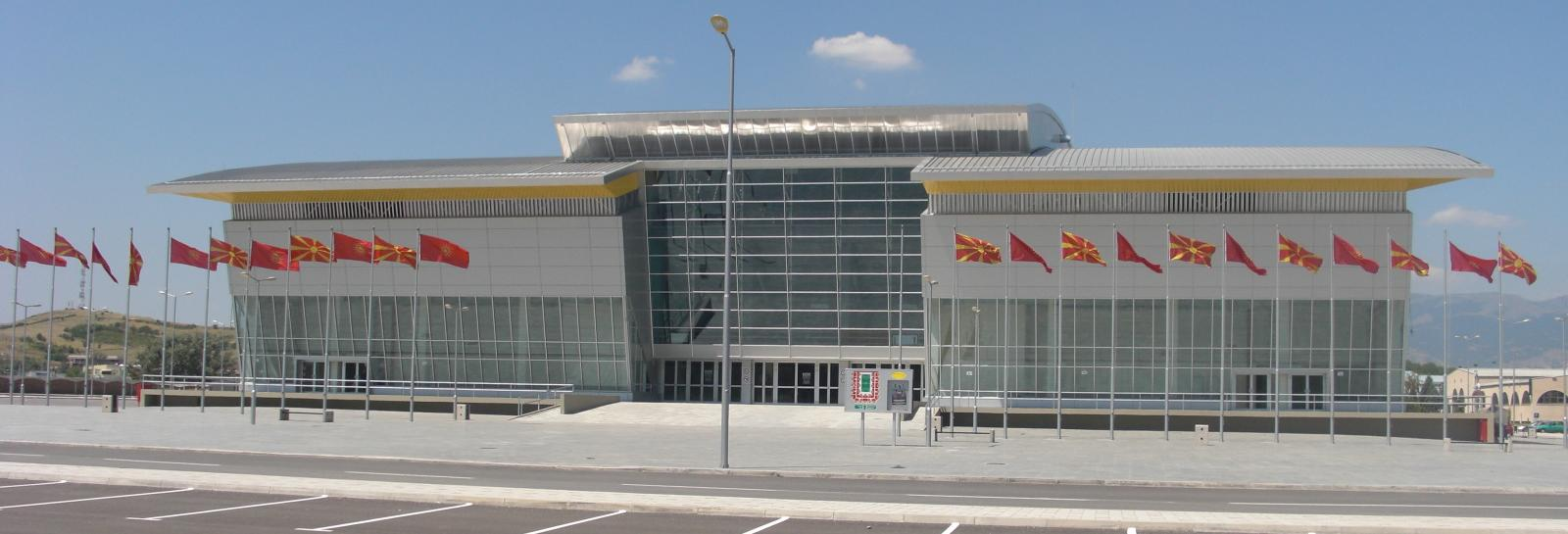
- The Boris Trajkovski Sports Center in Skopje, was supposed to host the second leg of the final.

Tournament information
- Sport: Handball
- Dates: 14 September 2024–25 May 2025
- Teams: 74
- Website: ehfec.com

Final positions
- Champions: (North Macedonia) RK Alkaloid (1st title)
- Runner-up: (Greece) AEK Athens HC

Tournament statistics
- Matches played: 145

The 2024–25 EHF European Cup was the 28th season of Europe's tertiary club handball tournament organised by European Handball Federation (EHF), and the 5th season since it was renamed from the Challenge Cup to the EHF European Cup. Valur were the defending champions, but did not defend their title as they played in the EHF European League.

The winners were Macedonian handball club RK Alkaloid, who beat Greek side, AEK Athens HC, after they failed to appear for the second leg, giving RK Alkaloid a forfeit win.

== Format ==
The tournament was played in a knockout format. Ties were played in a home-and-away format. Finalists played a total of seven rounds (Round 1, Round 2, Round 3, Last 16, Quarterfinals, Semifinals and the Final).

== Rankings ==
Rankings for the following federations were based on performances of clubs from each respective country during the most recent three-year period.

Rank	Association	Average points	Teams
1	Greece	36.33	5
2	Czech Republic	29.67	3
3	Serbia	29.33	3
4	Cyprus	23.33	2
5	Estonia	17.33	3
6	Luxembourg	14.67	3
7	Israel	13.33	1
8	Italy	12.00	5
9	Turkey	12.00	4
10	Bosnia and Herzegovina	12.00	5
11	Kosovo	11.33	3
12	Finland	9.67	2
13	Latvia	9.67	1
14	Lithuania	7.67	4
15	Netherlands	7.33	2
16	Belgium	5.00	2
17	Bulgaria	4.33	0
18	Faroe Islands	4.00	2
19	Montenegro	2.33	1
20	Azerbaijan	2.00	2
21	Moldova	0.33	0
N/A	(United Kingdom) Great Britain	0.00	1
N/A	(N/A) Everyone else	0.00	0

For the following federations the number of spots in the EHF European Cup depended on the number spots in the other two European competitions.

	Association	Average points	Teams
22	Sweden	48.00	0
23	Norway	45.33	3
24	Romania	42.50	3
25	Croatia	35.00	1
26	Russia	28.50	0
27	Slovenia	28.33	3
28	Belarus	18.00	0
29	Switzerland	17.33	1
30	Slovakia	16.33	1
31	Austria	13.33	3
32	Iceland	12.67	1
33	Ukraine	9.67	1
N/A	North Macedonia	0.00	3

== Qualified teams ==
The full list of teams qualified for each stage of the 2024–25 EHF European Cup was announced on 9 July 2024.

Notes in the parentheses show how each team qualified for the place of its starting round:

- EC: European Cup title holders
- CW: Cup winners
- CR: Cup runners-up
- 2nd, 3rd, etc.: League position of the previous season

Round 2
(Austria) Förthof UHK Krems (3rd)	(Austria) Handball Westwien (3rd, CW)	(Azerbaijan) HC Baki	(Azerbaijan) Kur
(Belgium) HC Visé BM	(Belgium) Sezoens Achilles Bocholt	(Bosnia and Herzegovina) RK Izviđač (1st) (Note: As the losing team of the special European League play-off RK Izviđač dropped down to the European Cup.)	(Bosnia and Herzegovina) RK Borac m:tel (2nd, CW)
(Bosnia and Herzegovina) RK Gračanica (3rd)	(Cyprus) Sabbianco Anorthosis Famagusta	(Cyprus) Parnassos Strovolou	(Czech Republic) HK FCC Město Lovosice (3rd)
(Czech Republic) HC Robe Zubří (6th, CR)	(Czech Republic) SKKP Handball Brno (7th)	(Estonia) Põlva Serviti (1st)	(Estonia) Mistra (2nd)
(Faroe Islands) H71 (1st)	(Faroe Islands) VÍF	(Finland) BK-46 (1st, CW)	(Finland) HC Cocks (2nd)
(Greece) Olympiacos SFP (1st)	(Greece) AEK Athens HC (2nd)	(Greece) AC PAOK (3rd, CW)	(United Kingdom) London GD
(Iceland) Haukar (5th)	(Israel) Holon Yuvalim HC	(Italy) Junior Fasano (1st)	(Italy) SSV Brixen Handball (2nd, CW)
(Kosovo) KH Besa Famgas	(Kosovo) KH Rahoveci	(Latvia) ZRHK Tenax Dobele (1st)	(Lithuania) VHC Šviesa (1st)
(Lithuania) Dragūnas Klaipėda (2nd)	(Luxembourg) HC Berchem (1st)	(Luxembourg) Handball Esch (4th, CW)	(Montenegro) HC Lovcen-Cetinje (1st, CW)
(Netherlands) HV KRAS/Volendam	(Netherlands) JD Techniek Hurry-Up	(North Macedonia) RK Alkaloid (3rd, CW)	(North Macedonia) GRK Ohrid (4th)
(Norway) ØIF Arendal (3rd)	(Norway) Runar Sandefjord (5th)	(Romania) CS Minaur Baia Mare (3rd)	(Romania) AHC Potaissa Turda (4th)
(Serbia) RK Metaloplastika Elixir (2nd)	(Serbia) RK Partizan AdmiralBet (3rd, CW)	(Serbia) RK Dinamo Pančevo (4th)	(Slovakia) MŠK Považská Bystrica (2nd)
(Slovenia) Celje Pivovarna Laško (3rd)	(Slovenia) MRK Krka (4th)	(Switzerland) Pfadi Winterthur (4th)	(Turkey) Beşiktaş (1st, CW)
(Turkey) Beykoz BLD SK (3rd)	(Ukraine) HC Motor (1st, CW)		

Round 1
(Austria) HC Fivers WAT Margareten (4th)	(Bosnia and Herzegovina) RK Leotar (4th, CR)	(Bosnia and Herzegovina) RK Sloboda (5th)	(Croatia) RK Poreč (5th)
(Estonia) Viljandi HC (3rd)	(Greece) Bianco Monte Drama (4th, CR)	(Greece) Diomidis Argous (5th)	(Italy) Pallamano Conversano (3rd)
(Italy) Black Devils Meran (4th, CR)	(Italy) Raimond Sassari (7th)^{WC}	(Kosovo) KH Kastrioti	(Lithuania) Granitas-Karys (3rd)
(Lithuania) HC Amber (4th)	(Luxembourg) HB Dudelange (3rd, CR)	(Norway) Drammen HK (4th)	(North Macedonia) GRK Tikveš (5th)
(Romania) CSM București (5th)	(Slovenia) RK Jeruzalem Ormož (5th)	(Turkey) Spor Toto SK (4th, CR)	(Turkey) Köycegiz BLD SK (6th)

== Qualifying rounds ==
=== Round 1 ===
A total of 20 teams played in the first round. First leg matches were held on 14 and 15 September 2024, while second leg matches took place on 21 and 22 September 2024. The draw was on 16 July 2024.

Results

Team 1	Agg.	Team 2	1st leg	2nd leg
Viljandi HC (Estonia)	48–71	(Romania) CSM București	24–35	24–36
Köycegiz BLD SK (Turkey)	65–66	(Bosnia and Herzegovina) RK Leotar	37–33	28–33
RK Jeruzalem Ormož (Slovenia)	67–54	(Lithuania) Granitas-Karys	32–26	35–28
Bianco Monte Drama 1986 (Greece)	57–53	(North Macedonia) GRK Tikveš	31–27	26–26
KH Kastrioti (Kosovo)	58–61	(Bosnia and Herzegovina) RK Sloboda	30–29	28–32
Pallamano Conversano 1973 (Italy)	58–81	(Norway) Drammen HK	31–43	27–38
HC Amber (Lithuania)	49–57	(Austria) HC Fivers WAT Margareten	27–35	22–22
Black Devils Meran (Italy)	54–64	(Greece) Diomidis Argous	24–35	30–29
HB Dudelange (Luxembourg)	74–75	(Italy) Raimond Sassari	36–36	38–39
Spor Toto SK (Turkey)	52–61	(Croatia) RK Poreč	26–32	26–29

=== Round 2 ===
A total of 64 teams played in the second round. First leg matches were held on 19 and 20 October 2024, while second leg matches took place on 26 and 27 October 2024.

Results

Team 1	Agg.	Team 2	1st leg	2nd leg
H71 (Faroe Islands)	63–74	(Italy) SSV Brixen Handball	33–40	30–34
VÍF (Faroe Islands)	56–59	(Austria) Handball Westwien	22–29	34–30
HC Visé BM (Belgium)	51–63	(Greece) Diomidis Argous	21–26	30–37
JD Techniek Hurry-Up (Netherlands)	48–61	(Estonia) Põlva Serviti	21–25	27–36
Raimond Sassari (Italy)	66–71	(Bosnia and Herzegovina) RK Izviđač	38–39	28–32
Pfadi Winterthur (Switzerland)	53–46	(Bosnia and Herzegovina) RK Sloboda	24–26	29–20
RK Poreč (Croatia)	69–42	(United Kingdom) London GD	36–24	33–18
RK Borac m:tel (Bosnia and Herzegovina)	45–53	(Slovenia) RK Jeruzalem Ormož	26–20	19–33
CSM București (Romania)	51–66	(Norway) Runar Sandefjord	25–37	26–29
ZRHK Tenax Dobele (Latvia)	49–51	(Bosnia and Herzegovina) RK Leotar	24–26	25–25
Olympiacos SFP (Greece)	59–56	(Austria) HC Fivers WAT Margareten	30–21	29–35
ØIF Arendal (Norway)	73–59	(Greece) Bianco Monte Drama 1986	37–35	36–24
Drammen HK (Norway)	70–51	(Israel) Holon Yuvalim HC	35–29	35–22
VHC Šviesa (Lithuania)	59–61	(Estonia) Mistra	34–30	25–31
Beşiktaş (Turkey)	56–53	(Serbia) RK Dinamo Pančevo	34–27	22–26
HK FCC Město Lovosice (Czech Republic)	65–63	(Kosovo) KH Besa Famgas	38–28	27–35
RK Partizan AdmiralBet (Serbia)	62–46	(Luxembourg) HC Berchem	35–24	27–22
MŠK Považská Bystrica (Slovakia)	52–49	(Czech Republic) HC Robe Zubří	25–20	27–29
RK Metaloplastika Elixir (Serbia)	58–60	(Slovenia) MRK Krka	30–32	28–28
RK Gračanica (Bosnia and Herzegovina)	61–76	(Slovenia) RK Celje Pivovarna Laško	35–43	26–33
GRK Ohrid (North Macedonia)	60–64	(Romania) AHC Potaissa Turda	31–25	29–39
HC Alkaloid (North Macedonia)	79–62	(Lithuania) Dragūnas Klaipėda	42–31	37–31
Förthof UHK Krems (Austria)	64–59	(Netherlands) HV KRAS/Volendam	29–26	35–33
Handball Esch (Luxembourg)	55–78	(Ukraine) HC Motor	26–32	29–46
Sezoens Achilles Bocholt (Belgium)	57–66	(Kosovo) KH Rahoveci	32–29	25–37
BK-46 (Finland)	70–49	(Czech Republic) SKKP Handball Brno	41–26	29–23
Haukar (Iceland)	64–53	(Finland) HC Cocks	35–26	29–27
CS Minaur Baia Mare (Romania)	91–69	(Turkey) Beykoz BLD SK	44–30	47–39
Junior Fasano (Italy)	46–77	(Greece) AEK Athens HC	20–38	26–39
Sabbianco Anorthosis Famagusta (Cyprus)	67–57	(Greece) A.C. PAOK	30–24	37–33
Parnassos Strovolou (Cyprus)	60–67	(Azerbaijan) Kur	31–35	29–32
HC Baki (Azerbaijan)	44–78	(Montenegro) HC Lovcen-Cetinje	21–41	23–37

=== Round 3 ===
A total of 32 teams played in the third round. First leg matches were held on 23 and 24 November 2024, while second leg matches took place on 30 November and 1 December 2024.

Results

Team 1	Agg.	Team 2	1st leg	2nd leg
Drammen HK (Norway)	65–51	(Bosnia and Herzegovina) RK Leotar	33–30	32–21
Põlva Serviti (Estonia)	53–56	(Turkey) Beşiktaş	26–24	27–32
MŠK Považská Bystrica (Slovakia)	54–65	(Finland) BK-46	28–31	26–34
ØIF Arendal (Norway)	52–59	(Greece) Diomidis Argous	19–23	33–36
AHC Potaissa Turda (Romania)	58–59	(Greece) Olympiacos SFP	27–32	31–27
SSV Brixen Handball (Italy)	66–55	(Czech Republic) HK FCC Město Lovosice	32–26	34–29
Förthof UHK Krems (Austria)	45–54	(Serbia) RK Partizan AdmiralBet	25–24	20–30
RK Poreč (Croatia)	45–52	(Slovenia) MRK Krka	21–23	24–29
KH Rahoveci (Kosovo)	71–73	(Romania) CS Minaur Baia Mare	31–38	40–35
Mistra (Estonia)	56–69	(Slovenia) RK Jeruzalem Ormož	30–34	26–35
Runar Sandefjord (Norway)	71–60	(Slovenia) RK Celje Pivovarna Laško	41–28	30–32
HC Motor (Ukraine)	72–73	(Bosnia and Herzegovina) RK Izviđač	33–32	39–41
Anorthosis Famagusta (Cyprus)	69–64	(Switzerland) Pfadi Winterthur	37–28	32–36
HC Alkaloid (North Macedonia)	70–56	(Austria) Handball Westwien	38–27	32–29
Haukar (Iceland)	68–52	(Azerbaijan) Kur	30–25	38–27
AEK Athens HC (Greece)	86–57	(Montenegro) HC Lovcen-Cetinje	45–26	41–31

== Last 16 ==
First leg matches were held on 15 and 16 February 2025, while second leg matches took place on 29 and 30 March 2025.

Results

Team 1	Agg.	Team 2	1st leg	2nd leg
Runar Sandefjord (Norway)	65–64	(Turkey) Beşiktaş	35–35	30–29
Drammen HK (Norway)	65–70	(Greece) Olympiacos SFP	35–36	30–34
RK Partizan AdmiralBet (Serbia)	58–50	(Greece) AC Diomidis Argous	26–28	32–22
AEK Athens HC (Greece)	69–53	(Slovenia) MRK Krka	38–28	31–25
SSV Brixen Handball (Italy)	63–82	(North Macedonia) HC Alkaloid	22–44	31–38
Anorthosis Famagusta (Cyprus)	50–55	(Bosnia and Herzegovina) RK Izviđač	25–25	25–30
Haukar (Iceland)	62–49	(Slovenia) RK Jeruzalem Ormož	31–23	31–26
CS Minaur Baia Mare (Romania)	64–62	(Finland) BK-46	33–30	31–32

== Quarterfinals ==
Results

Team 1	Agg.	Team 2	1st leg	2nd leg
CS Minaur Baia Mare (Romania)	56–63	(North Macedonia) HC Alkaloid	31–31	25–32
AEK Athens HC (Greece)	46–46 7–6 PS	(Serbia) RK Partizan AdmiralBet	27–22	19–24
Olympiacos SFP (Greece)	60–64	(Norway) Runar Sandefjord	37–31	23–33
Haukar (Iceland)	56–60	(Bosnia and Herzegovina) RK Izviđač	30–27	26–33

=== Matches ===
23 March 2025; 17:00	CS Minaur Baia Mare (Romania)	31–31	(North Macedonia) HC Alkaloid	Lascăr Pană Sports Hall, Baia Mare; Attendance: 2,500; Referees: Novykov (UKR), Gatelis (LTU)
23 March 2025; 17:00	six players 4	(19–15)	Serafimov 7	Lascăr Pană Sports Hall, Baia Mare; Attendance: 2,500; Referees: Novykov (UKR), Gatelis (LTU)
23 March 2025; 17:00	2× (yellow card) 2× (suspension)	Report	1× (yellow card) 5× (suspension)	Lascăr Pană Sports Hall, Baia Mare; Attendance: 2,500; Referees: Novykov (UKR), Gatelis (LTU)

30 March 2025; 19:00	HC Alkaloid (North Macedonia)	32–25	(Romania) CS Minaur Baia Mare	Avtokomanda, Skopje; Attendance: 800; Referees: Fremstad, Jorstad (NOR)
30 March 2025; 19:00	Petkovski 7	(18–12)	Cumpanici 8	Avtokomanda, Skopje; Attendance: 800; Referees: Fremstad, Jorstad (NOR)
30 March 2025; 19:00	1× (yellow card) 5× (suspension)	Report	3× (yellow card)	Avtokomanda, Skopje; Attendance: 800; Referees: Fremstad, Jorstad (NOR)

HC Alkaloid won 63–56 on aggregate.

22 March 2025; 18:00	AEK Athens HC (Greece)	27–22	(Serbia) RK Partizan AdmiralBet	OAKA Sport Hall Kassimatis, Athens; Attendance: 800; Referees: Hellbusch, Jansen (GER)
22 March 2025; 18:00	Panagiotou 5	(17–12)	Zecevic 6	OAKA Sport Hall Kassimatis, Athens; Attendance: 800; Referees: Hellbusch, Jansen (GER)
22 March 2025; 18:00	1× (yellow card) 3× (suspension) 1× (red card)	Report	1× (yellow card) 7× (suspension) 1× (red card)	OAKA Sport Hall Kassimatis, Athens; Attendance: 800; Referees: Hellbusch, Jansen (GER)

7 April 2025
12:00
RK Partizan AdmiralBet (Serbia)
30–26
(Greece) AEK Athens HC
Arena Shumen, Shumen, Bulgaria (Note: The game was originally scheduled for the 30 March, but due to security issues, the game was postponed. It was later scheduled for the 7 April in a neutral venue.)
Attendance: Behind closed doors
Referees: Doychinov, Goretsov (BUL)
Crnoglavac 10
(11–10)
Davyes 5
3× (yellow card)
Report
3× (yellow card)

FT: 24–19 Pen: 6–7

AEK Athens HC won 53–52 on aggregate.

23 March 2025; 17:00	Olympiacos SFP (Greece)	37–31	(Norway) Runar Sandefjord	A'Indoor Sports Hall of Ilioupolis, Ilioupolis; Attendance: 700; Referees: Xhema, Jahja (KOS)
23 March 2025; 17:00	Vejin 7	(19–12)	Sjursen Syversen, Wulvik 6	A'Indoor Sports Hall of Ilioupolis, Ilioupolis; Attendance: 700; Referees: Xhema, Jahja (KOS)
23 March 2025; 17:00	1× (yellow card) 5× (suspension)	Report	1× (yellow card) 1× (suspension)	A'Indoor Sports Hall of Ilioupolis, Ilioupolis; Attendance: 700; Referees: Xhema, Jahja (KOS)

30 March 2025; 17:00	Runar Sandefjord (Norway)	33–23	(Greece) Olympiacos SFP	Runarhallen, Sandefjord; Attendance: 825; Referees: Cernavskis, Bogdanovs (LAT)
30 March 2025; 17:00	Rambo, Wulvik 7	(14–10)	Savvas 7	Runarhallen, Sandefjord; Attendance: 825; Referees: Cernavskis, Bogdanovs (LAT)
30 March 2025; 17:00	2× (yellow card) 4× (suspension)	Report	1× (suspension)	Runarhallen, Sandefjord; Attendance: 825; Referees: Cernavskis, Bogdanovs (LAT)

Runar Sandefjord won 64–60 on aggregate.

22 March 2025; 17:00	Haukar (Iceland)	30–27	(Bosnia and Herzegovina) RK Izviđač	Ithrottamidstod Hauka Asvellir, Hafnarfjörður; Attendance: 194; Referees: Altmar, Horvath (HUN)
22 March 2025; 17:00	Einarsson 6	(15–12)	Cesko 10	Ithrottamidstod Hauka Asvellir, Hafnarfjörður; Attendance: 194; Referees: Altmar, Horvath (HUN)
22 March 2025; 17:00	3× (yellow card)	Report	4× (yellow card)	Ithrottamidstod Hauka Asvellir, Hafnarfjörður; Attendance: 194; Referees: Altmar, Horvath (HUN)

29 March 2025; 20:00	RK Izviđač (Bosnia and Herzegovina)	33–26	(Iceland) Haukar	Sportska Dvorana Ljubuski, Ljubuški; Attendance: 4,000; Referees: Aghakishi, Aghakishi (AZE)
29 March 2025; 20:00	Cesko, Vukšic 9	(13–8)	Grímsson 6	Sportska Dvorana Ljubuski, Ljubuški; Attendance: 4,000; Referees: Aghakishi, Aghakishi (AZE)
29 March 2025; 20:00	6× (yellow card)	Report	1× (yellow card) 3× (suspension)	Sportska Dvorana Ljubuski, Ljubuški; Attendance: 4,000; Referees: Aghakishi, Aghakishi (AZE)

RK Izviđač won 60–56 on aggregate.

== Semifinals ==
Results

Team 1	Agg.	Team 2	1st leg	2nd leg
HC Alkaloid (North Macedonia)	71–71 3–1 PS	(Norway) Runar Sandefjord	42–37	29–34
AEK Athens HC (Greece)	61–56	(Bosnia and Herzegovina) RK Izviđač	37–28	24–28

=== Matches ===
20 April 2025; 19:00	HC Alkaloid (North Macedonia)	42–37	(Norway) Runar Sandefjord	Avtokomanda, Skopje; Attendance: 650; Referees: Panayides, Andreou (CYP)
20 April 2025; 19:00	Serafimov 10	(21–20)	Rambo 11	Avtokomanda, Skopje; Attendance: 650; Referees: Panayides, Andreou (CYP)
20 April 2025; 19:00	1× (yellow card) 2× (suspension)	Report	1× (yellow card) 5× (suspension)	Avtokomanda, Skopje; Attendance: 650; Referees: Panayides, Andreou (CYP)

27 April 2025
17:00
Runar Sandefjord (Norway)
34–29
(North Macedonia) HC Alkaloid
Runarhallen, Sandefjord
Attendance: 890
Referees: Simone, Monitillo (ITA)
Gurrich 8
(19–15)
Mitev 9
1× (yellow card) 3× (suspension)
Report
1× (yellow card) 4× (suspension)

FT: 35–32 Pen: 1–3

HC Alkaloid won 74–72 on aggregate.

19 April 2025; 16:10	AEK Athens HC (Greece)	37–28	(Bosnia and Herzegovina) RK Izviđač	OAKA Sport Hall Kassimatis, Athens; Attendance: 811; Referees: Sirbu, Serdiuc (MDA)
19 April 2025; 16:10	Keita 7	(20–13)	Vukšic 6	OAKA Sport Hall Kassimatis, Athens; Attendance: 811; Referees: Sirbu, Serdiuc (MDA)
19 April 2025; 16:10	5× (suspension)	Report	3× (suspension)	OAKA Sport Hall Kassimatis, Athens; Attendance: 811; Referees: Sirbu, Serdiuc (MDA)

26 April 2025; 20:00	RK Izviđač (Bosnia and Herzegovina)	28–24	(Greece) AEK Athens HC	Sportska Dvorana Ljubuski, Ljubuški; Attendance: 4,000; Referees: Jerlecki, Labun (POL)
26 April 2025; 20:00	Odak 6	(13–12)	Matic 6	Sportska Dvorana Ljubuski, Ljubuški; Attendance: 4,000; Referees: Jerlecki, Labun (POL)
26 April 2025; 20:00	1× (yellow card) 6× (suspension)	Report	5× (suspension)	Sportska Dvorana Ljubuski, Ljubuški; Attendance: 4,000; Referees: Jerlecki, Labun (POL)

AEK Athens HC won 61–56 on aggregate.

== Final ==
Results

Team 1	Agg.	Team 2	1st leg	2nd leg
AEK Athens HC (Greece)	25–39	(North Macedonia) HC Alkaloid	25–29	0–10

=== Matches ===
18 May 2025; 18:00	AEK Athens HC (Greece)	25–29	(North Macedonia) HC Alkaloid	SUNEL Arena, Athens; Attendance: 7,800; Referees: Sniurevicius, Grigalionis (LTU)
18 May 2025; 18:00	Garain 6	(14–16)	Serafimov 6	SUNEL Arena, Athens; Attendance: 7,800; Referees: Sniurevicius, Grigalionis (LTU)
18 May 2025; 18:00	2× (suspension)	Report	5× (suspension)	SUNEL Arena, Athens; Attendance: 7,800; Referees: Sniurevicius, Grigalionis (LTU)

25 May 2025; 20:30	HC Alkaloid (North Macedonia)	10–0 (Note: Due to security concerns in the arena, the final was cancelled. On 5 June 2025, the EHF decided that HC Alkaloid would be given a 10–0 forfeit win and declared them the champions, because AEK refused to play)	(Greece) AEK Athens HC
25 May 2025; 20:30		(–)
25 May 2025; 20:30		Report

Alkaloid won 39–25 on aggregate.

== See also ==
- 2024–25 EHF Champions League
- 2024–25 EHF European League
- 2024–25 Women's EHF Champions League
- 2024–25 Women's EHF European League
- 2024–25 Women's EHF European Cup
