= 2021–22 EHF European Cup =

EHF European Cup
- 2021–22

Tournament information
- Sport: Handball
- Dates: 6 September 2021–28 May 2022
- Teams: 74 (qualification stage); 16 (main stage)
- Website: ehfec.com

Final positions
- Champions: (Norway) Nærbø IL (1st title)
- Runner-up: (Romania) CS Minaur Baia Mare

Tournament statistics
- Top scorer: Mathias Pedersen (55 goals)

The 2021–22 EHF European Cup was the 25th season of Europe's tertiary club handball tournament organised by European Handball Federation (EHF), and the 2nd season since it was renamed from the Challenge Cup to the EHF European Cup.

== Qualified teams ==
The full list of teams qualified for each stage of the 2021–22 EHF European Cup was announced on 13 July 2021.

The labels in the parentheses show how each team qualified for the place of its starting round:

- EC: European Cup title holders
- CW: Cup winners
- CR: Cup runners-up
- 4th, 5th, etc.: League position of the previous season
  - SF: Semi-final league position
  - QF: Quarter-final league position

Round 3
| (Greece) PAOK (2nd) | (Romania) AHC Potaissa Turda (2nd) | (Russia) Dinamo Viktor Stavropol (3rd) | (Czech Republic) Talent tym Plzenskeho kraje (1st) | (Sweden) IFK Skövde (2nd) |

Round 2
| (Norway) Nærbø IL (6th) | (Bosnia and Herzegovina) RK Izviđač (1st) | (Slovenia) Jeruzalem Ormož (4th) | (Cyprus) Sabbianco A. Famagusta (1st) |
| (Ukraine) Donbas Donetsk Region (2nd) | (Iceland) Haukar (2nd) | (Luxembourg) Handball Esch (1st) | (Slovakia) MŠK Považská Bystrica (2nd) |
| (Finland) BK-46 (3rd) | (Israel) Hapoel Ashdod (SF) | (Belarus) SKA Minsk (2nd) | (Austria) HC Fivers Margareten (2nd) |
| (Lithuania) Vilnius VHC Sviesa (QF) | (Turkey) Beşiktaş Yurtbay Seramik (2nd) | (Estonia) Põlva Serviti (1st) | (Latvia) ZRHK Tenax Dobele (1st) |
| (Serbia) Partizan (2nd) | (Kosovo) KH Besa Famgas | (Netherlands) Herpertz Bevo HC | (Switzerland) HSC Suhr Aarau (SF) |
| (Italy) Pallamano Conversano 2014 (1st) | (Bulgaria) Osam Lovech (2nd) | (Faroe Islands) H71 | (Greece) AC Diomidis Argous (3rd) |
| (Romania) CSM Focșani (5th) | (Russia) SKIF (8th) | (Czech Republic) HCB Karviná (2nd) | (Norway) Drammen HK (3rd) |
| (Bosnia and Herzegovina) Borac m:tel (2nd) | (Cyprus) Parnassos Strovolou | (Ukraine) Odesa (3rd) | (Iceland) FH (QF) |
| (Luxembourg) HC Berchem (3rd) | (Israel) AS SGS Ramhat Hashron (SF) | (Belarus) Masheka Mogilev (4th) | (Austria) Förthof UHK Krems (SF) |
| (Lithuania) Dragūnas Klaipėda (3rd) | (Turkey) İzmir BSB SK (4th) | (Estonia) HC Tallinn (2nd) | |

Round 1
| (Serbia) RK Metaloplastika (3rd) | (Kosovo) Prishtina | (Netherlands) JD Techniek Hurry-up | (Italy) Raimond Sassari (2nd) |
| (Bulgaria) Lokomotiv Gorna Oryahovitsa (3rd) | (Greece) Bianco Monte Drama 1986 (4th) | (Czech Republic) HC Dukla Prague (3rd) | (Bosnia and Herzegovina) Sloga (3rd) |
| (Cyprus) APOEL | (Ukraine) Motor-Polytekhnika (1st) | (Iceland) Selfoss (QF) | (Luxembourg) HB Käerjeng (2nd) |
| (Israel) Holon Yuvalim (QF) | (Austria) INSIGNIS HB Westwien (QF) | (Lithuania) Granitas Kaunas (4th) | (Turkey) Beykoz Belediyesi GSK (3rd) |
| (Estonia) Viljandi HC (4th) | (Serbia) Železničar 1949 (4th) | (Kosovo) KH Trepça | (Czech Republic) HC ROBE Zubří (QF) |
| (Luxembourg) HB Dudelange (4th) | (Kosovo) KH Vëllaznimi | (Greece) AESH Pylaia (5th) | (Romania) CS Minaur Baia Mare (6th) |
| (Russia) SGAU-Saratov (4th) | (Czech Republic) KH ISMM Kopřivnice (QF) | (Sweden) Alingsås HK (QF) | (Norway) Bækkelagets SK (4th) |
| (Bosnia and Herzegovina) Sloboda Tuzla (4th) | (Austria) Sparkasse Schwaz HB Tirol (SF) | | |

== Qualifying rounds ==
=== Round 1 ===
A total of 30 teams were involved in the first qualifying round. The first leg matches were held on 11–12 September 2021, while the second leg matches were held on 18–19 September 2021. The draw was held in EHF office in Vienna.

Results

| Team 1 | Agg. | Team 2 | 1st leg | 2nd leg |
|---|---|---|---|---|
| Prishtina (Note: Prishtina vs Sparkasse Schwaz HB Tirol was cancelled due to COVID-19 restrictions. Sparkasse Schwaz HB Tirol advanced to the next round.) (Kosovo) | 0–20 | (Austria) Sparkasse Schwaz HB Tirol | 0–10 | 0–10 |
| INSIGNIS HB Westwien (Austria) | 46–60 | (Russia) SGAU-Saratov | 27–29 | 19–31 |
| Viljandi HC (Estonia) | 43–45 | (Bosnia and Herzegovina) Sloga | 20–20 | 23–25 |
| Alingsås HK (Sweden) | 63–53 | (Serbia) RK Metaloplastika | 29–23 | 34–30 |
| APOEL (Cyprus) | 38–69 | (Czech Republic) HC ROBE Zubří | 27–29 | 11–40 |
| CS Minaur Baia Mare (Romania) | 77–43 | (Bulgaria) Lokomotiv Gorna Oryahovitsa | 44–22 | 33–21 |
| Granitas Kaunas (Lithuania) | 75–40 | (Serbia) Železničar 1949 | 46–18 | 29–22 |
| HB Käerjeng (Luxembourg) | 68–49 | (Kosovo) KH Vëllaznimi | 32–23 | 36–26 |
| Sloboda Tuzla (Bosnia and Herzegovina) | 46–47 | (Italy) Bianco Monte Drama 1986 | 29–23 | 17–24 |
| Beykoz Belediyesi GSK (Turkey) | 62–56 | (Netherlands) JD Techniek Hurry-up | 32–23 | 30–33 |
| Motor-Polytekhnika (Ukraine) | 43–73 | (Norway) Bækkelagets SK | 23–41 | 20–32 |
| HB Dudelange (Luxembourg) | 45–52 | (Italy) Raimond Sassari | 24–23 | 21–29 |
| KH ISMM Kopřivnice (Czech Republic) | 53–59 | (Iceland) Selfoss | 25–31 | 28–28 |
| KH Trepça (Kosovo) | 47–66 | (Israel) Holon Yuvalim | 22–29 | 25–37 |
| AESH Pylaia (Greece) | 53–68 | (Czech Republic) HC Dukla Prague | 28–37 | 25–31 |

=== Round 2 ===
A total of 54 teams were involved in the second qualifying round, 15 teams advancing from the previous round and 39 teams entering this round. The first leg matches were held on 16–17 October 2021, while the second leg matches were held on 23–24 October 2021. The draw was held in EHF office in Vienna.

Results

| Team 1 | Agg. | Team 2 | 1st leg | 2nd leg |
|---|---|---|---|---|
| BK-46 (Note: BK-46 vs SGAU-Saratov was cancelled due to COVID-19 restrictions. SGAU-Saratov advanced to the next round.) (Finland) | 0–20 | (Russia) SGAU-Saratov | 0–10 | 0–10 |
| HC ROBE Zubří (Czech Republic) | 86–42 | (Bulgaria) Osam Lovech | 43–20 | 43–22 |
| Pallamano Conversano 2014 (Italy) | 64–49 | (Bosnia and Herzegovina) Sloga | 31–24 | 33–25 |
| Dragūnas Klaipėda (Lithuania) | 48–51 | (Slovakia) MŠK Považská Bystrica | 26–25 | 22–26 |
| Beykoz Belediyesi GSK (Turkey) | 53–56 | (Russia) SKIF | 29–30 | 24–26 |
| Vilnius VHC Sviesa (Lithuania) | 52–53 | (Estonia) HC Tallinn | 24–22 | 28–31 |
| Parnassos Strovolou (Cyprus) | 39–62 | (Iceland) Haukar | 14–25 | 25–37 |
| AC Diomidis Argous (Greece) | 55–58 | (Greece) Bianco Monte Drama 1986 | 26–30 | 29–28 |
| Partizan (Serbia) | 63–53 | (Luxembourg) HC Berchem | 33–22 | 30–31 |
| Sparkasse Schwaz HB Tirol (Austria) | 50–52 | (Cyprus) Sabbianco A. Famagusta | 24–27 | 26–25 |
| FH (Iceland) | 55–62 | (Belarus) SKA Minsk | 29–37 | 26–25 |
| Odesa (Ukraine) | 63–75 | (Luxembourg) Handball Esch | 31–38 | 32–37 |
| HCB Karviná (Czech Republic) | 64–51 | (Turkey) İzmir BSB SK | 32–26 | 32–25 |
| RK Izviđač (Bosnia and Herzegovina) | 50–62 | (Czech Republic) HC Dukla Prague | 26–28 | 24–34 |
| HC Fivers Margareten (Austria) | 66–70 | (Norway) Bækkelagets SK | 34–38 | 32–32 |
| H71 (Faroe Islands) | 42–56 | (Norway) Drammen HK | 22–24 | 20–32 |
| Selfoss (Iceland) | 53–49 | (Slovenia) Jeruzalem Ormož | 31–31 | 22–28 |
| Granitas Kaunas (Lithuania) | 46–52 | (Estonia) Põlva Serviti | 27–26 | 19–26 |
| Masheka Mogilev (Belarus) | 52–56 | (Latvia) ZRHK Tenax Dobele | 27–22 | 25–34 |
| HSC Suhr Aarau (Switzerland) | 52–52 (a) | (Austria) Förthof UHK Krems | 25–23 | 27–29 |
| Borac m:tel (Bosnia and Herzegovina) | 50–54 | (Kosovo) KH Besa Famgas | 28–25 | 22–29 |
| CS Minaur Baia Mare (Romania) | 68–61 | (Israel) Hapoel Ashdod | 35–32 | 33–29 |
| Raimond Sassari (Italy) | 53–61 | (Norway) Nærbø IL | 28–35 | 25–26 |
| Beşiktaş Yurtbay Seramik (Turkey) | 76–60 | (Israel) Holon Yuvalim | 38–32 | 38–28 |
| Donbas (Ukraine) | 48–65 | (Sweden) Alingsås HK | 25–34 | 23–31 |
| Herpertz Bevo HC (Netherlands) | 60–62 | (Israel) AS SGS Ramhat Hashron | 30–32 | 30–30 |
| HB Käerjeng (Luxembourg) | 53–68 | (Romania) CSM Focșani | 27–35 | 26–33 |

=== Round 3 ===
A total of 32 teams were involved in the third qualifying round. The first leg matches were held on 27–28 November 2021, while the second leg matches were held on 3–4 December 2021. The draw was held in EHF office in Vienna.

Results

| Team 1 | Agg. | Team 2 | 1st leg | 2nd leg |
|---|---|---|---|---|
| ZRHK Tenax Dobele (Latvia) | 49–57 | (Greece) PAOK | 25–28 | 24–29 |
| AS SGS Ramhat Hashron (Israel) | 57–72 | (Sweden) IFK Skövde | 28–37 | 29–35 |
| Bianco Monte Drama 1986 (Greece) | 69–82 | (Russia) Dinamo Viktor Stavropol | 39–41 | 30–41 |
| CSM Focșani (Romania) | 54–53 | (Iceland) Haukar | 28–26 | 26–27 |
| Sabbianco A. Famagusta (Cyprus) | 46–62 | (Czech Republic) HCB Karviná | 24–29 | 22–33 |
| Pallamano Conversano 2014 (Italy) | 54–56 | (Norway) Nærbø IL | 27–25 | 27–31 |
| Handball Esch (Luxembourg) | 56–55 | (Norway) Bækkelagets SK | 30–30 | 26–25 |
| Partizan (Serbia) | 53–54 | (Romania) CS Minaur Baia Mare | 30–26 | 23–28 |
| SGAU-Saratov (Russia) | 48–47 | (Estonia) Põlva Serviti | 25–24 | 23–23 |
| Beşiktaş Yurtbay Seramik (Turkey) | 50–59 | (Belarus) SKA Minsk | 28–25 | 22–34 |
| HSC Suhr Aarau (Switzerland) | 60–54 | (Slovenia) Jeruzalem Ormož | 31–27 | 29–27 |
| Talent tym Plzenskeho kraje (Czech Republic) | 63–59 | (Czech Republic) HC ROBE Zubří | 35–27 | 28–32 |
| KH Besa Famgas (Kosovo) | 56–57 | (Romania) AHC Potaissa Turda | 30–28 | 26–29 |
| Drammen HK (Norway) | 61–59 | (Czech Republic) HC Dukla Prague | 28–29 | 33–30 |
| Alingsås HK (Sweden) | 68–50 | (Estonia) HC Tallinn | 36–18 | 32–32 |
| SKIF (Russia) | 53–49 | (Slovakia) MŠK Považská Bystrica | 25–22 | 28–27 |

== Last 16 ==
The first leg matches were held on 12–13 February 2022, while the second leg matches were held on 19–20 February 2022. The draw was held in EHF office in Vienna.

Results

| Team 1 | Agg. | Team 2 | 1st leg | 2nd leg |
|---|---|---|---|---|
| SGAU-Saratov (Russia) | 59–60 | (Russia) Dinamo Viktor Stavropol | 27–30 | 32–30 |
| AHC Potaissa Turda (Romania) | 61–71 | (Sweden) Alingsås HK | 31–30 | 30–41 |
| Drammen HK (Norway) | 37–33 | (Russia) SKIF | 37–23 | 0–10 |
| CS Minaur Baia Mare (Romania) | 59–49 | (Greece) PAOK | 32–21 | 27–28 |
| HCB Karviná (Czech Republic) | 51–57 | (Switzerland) HSC Suhr Aarau | 23–27 | 28–30 |
| Nærbø IL (Norway) | 67–58 | (Romania) CSM Focșani | 39–26 | 28–32 |
| Handball Esch (Luxembourg) | 56–63 | (Czech Republic) Talent tym Plzenskeho kraje | 30–34 | 26–29 |
| IFK Skövde (Sweden) | 54–55 (2–3 p) | (Belarus) SKA Minsk | 26–26 | 28–29 |

== Quarterfinals ==
The first leg matches were held on 26–27 March 2022, while the second leg matches were held on 3–4 April 2022. The draw was held in EHF office in Vienna.

Results

| Team 1 | Agg. | Team 2 | 1st leg | 2nd leg |
|---|---|---|---|---|
| Dinamo Viktor Stavropol (Russia) | 0–20 | (Romania) CS Minaur Baia Mare | 0–10 | 0–10 |
| SKA Minsk (Belarus) | 0–20 | (Norway) Nærbø IL | 0–10 | 0–10 |
| Alingsås HK (Sweden) | 58–54 | (Czech Republic) Talent tym Plzenskeho kraje | 29–29 | 29–25 |
| Drammen HK (Norway) | 64–61 | (Switzerland) HSC Suhr Aarau | 31–29 | 33–32 |

== Semifinals ==
The first leg matches were held on 23–24 April 2022, while the second leg matches were held on 30 April–1 May 2022. The draw was held in EHF office in Vienna.

Results

| Team 1 | Agg. | Team 2 | 1st leg | 2nd leg |
|---|---|---|---|---|
| CS Minaur Baia Mare (Romania) | 62–59 | (Sweden) Alingsås HK | 34–28 | 28–31 |
| Drammen HK (Norway) | 61–62 | (Norway) Nærbø IL | 30–27 | 31–35 |

== Final ==
The first leg match was held on 21 May 2022, while the second leg match was held on 28 May 2022. The draw was held in EHF office in Vienna.

Results

| Team 1 | Agg. | Team 2 | 1st leg | 2nd leg |
|---|---|---|---|---|
| Nærbø IL (Norway) | 56–51 | (Romania) CS Minaur Baia Mare | 29–25 | 27–26 |

== See also ==
- 2021–22 EHF Champions League
- 2021–22 EHF European League
- 2021–22 Women's EHF Champions League
- 2021–22 Women's EHF European League
- 2021–22 Women's EHF European Cup
