= 2014–15 Lithuanian Handball League =

- Dates: 27 September 2014 – 16 May 2015
- Country: Lithuania
- Teams: 10 (in 8 cities)

The 2014–15 Lithuanian Handball League season is the 26th season of the Lithuanian Handball League, the top level handball in Lithuania. Ten teams participated in the league. League started at 27 September 2014 and will finish on 16 May 2015.

== Regular season ==
Location of teams in the 2014-2015 Lithuanian Handball League

Pos	Team	Pld	W	D	L	GF	GA	GD	Pts
1	Dragūnas Klaipėda	18	17	0	1	594	418	+176	34
2	Almeida-Stronglasas Alytus	18	15	0	3	538	423	+115	30
3	Ūla Varėna	18	11	1	6	495	474	+21	23
4	Granitas Kaunas	18	10	2	6	535	465	+70	22
5	VHC Šviesa	18	10	0	8	547	496	+51	20
6	HC Vilnius	18	10	0	8	503	480	+23	20
7	SM Dubysa-Gubernija	18	7	0	11	483	542	−59	14
8	SM Rankininkas	18	4	0	14	424	554	−130	8
9	HC LSU Kaunas	18	3	0	15	446	540	−94	6
10	HC Utena	18	1	1	16	482	655	−173	3

== Playoffs ==
Quarterfinals
1	Dragūnas Klaipėda	38,44
8	SM Rankininkas	16,19
4	Granitas Kaunas	34,28,21
5	VHC Šviesa	29,35,24
2	Almeida-Stronglasas Alytus	29,28
7	SM Dubysa-Gubernija	22,21
3	Ūla Varėna	18,32,23
6	HC Vilnius	24,31,24

Semifinals
1	Dragūnas Klaipėda	36,37
5	VHC Šviesa	23,24
2	Almeida-Stronglasas Alytus	31,24
6	HC Vilnius	20,19

Finals
1	Dragūnas Klaipėda	32,34,27
2	Almeida-Stronglasas Alytus	19,24,21
Third place
5	VHC Šviesa	30,28,37
6	HC Vilnius	32,26,25

The final match was watched by 1.300 spectators in Švyturys Arena.
