= 2013–14 Lithuanian Handball League =

2013–2014 Lithuanian Handball League
- Dates: 11 September 2013 – 10 May 2014
- Country: Lithuania
- Teams: 9 (in 7 cities)
- Matches played: 93
- Goals scored: 5,151 (55.39 per match)

The 2013–14 Lithuanian Handball League season was the 25th season of the Lithuanian Handball League, the top level handball in Lithuania. Nine teams participated in the league. League started at 11 September 2013 and finished on 10 May 2014.

== Regular season ==
Location of teams in the 2013-2014 Lithuanian Handball League

Pos	Team	Pld	W	D	L	GF	GA	GD	Pts
1	Dragūnas Klaipėda	16	13	1	2	498	404	+94	27
2	Almeida-Stronglasas Alytus	16	11	2	3	434	367	+67	24
3	VHC Šviesa	16	11	1	4	487	440	+47	23
4	Ūla Varėna	16	10	1	5	452	392	+60	21
5	Granitas Kaunas	16	9	0	7	472	434	+38	18
6	HC Vilnius	16	6	1	9	451	461	−10	13
7	Lūšis Kaunas	16	5	1	10	416	479	−63	11
8	SM Dubysa-Gubernija	16	3	1	12	430	487	−57	7
9	HC Utena	16	0	0	16	419	595	−176	0

== Playoffs ==
=== Quarterfinals ===
- (1) Dragūnas Klaipėda - (8) SM Dubysa-Gubernija (29:22, 32:17)
- (2) Almeida-Stronglasas Alytus - (7) Lūšis Kaunas (21:16, 32:22)
- (3) VHC Šviesa - (6) HC Vilnius (32:26, 27:16)
- (4) Ūla Varėna - (5) Granitas Kaunas (21:26, 23:16, 21:28)

=== Semifinals ===
- (1) Dragūnas Klaipėda - (5) Granitas Kaunas (29:26, 29:30, 31:25)
- (2) Almeida-Stronglasas Alytus - (3) VHC Šviesa (27:31, 32:22, 20:28)

=== 3rd place game ===
- (5) Granitas Kaunas - (2) Almeida-Stronglasas Alytus (28:25, 25:26, 25:26)

=== Final ===
- (1) Dragūnas Klaipėda - (3) VHC Šviesa (36:29, 30:28, 30:27)

Attendance: 1,355 (450 per match)
