= 2020–21 Lithuanian Handball League =

Lithuanian Handball League
- Dates: 2 September 2020 – 22 May 2021
- Country: Lithuania
- Teams: 8 (in 7 cities)
- Matches played: 75
- Goals scored: 5,242 (69.89 per match)

The 2020–21 Lithuanian Handball League season was the 32nd season of the Lithuanian Handball League, the top level handball in Lithuania. Eight teams participated in the league. League started at 2 September 2020 and finished on 22 May 2021 in Vilnius.

VHC Šviesa won Lithuanian Handball League for the first time.

== Regular season ==
Location of teams in the 2020-2021 Lithuanian Handball League

Pos	Team	Pld	W	D	L	GF	GA	GD	Pts
1	VHC Šviesa	14	13	1	0	528	386	+142	27
2	Dragūnas Klaipėda	14	10	0	4	520	390	+130	20
3	Almeida-Stronglasas Alytus	14	9	2	3	472	388	+84	20
4	Granitas Kaunas	14	9	0	5	498	412	+86	18
5	HC Vilnius	14	6	1	7	521	406	+115	13
6	Panevėžys SC-RSSG-Grifas	14	4	0	10	419	506	−87	8
7	Šiauliai Dubysa	14	3	0	11	414	511	−97	6
8	HC Utena	14	0	0	14	300	673	−373	0

== Playoffs ==
Quarterfinals
1	VHC Šviesa	48, 46
8	HC Utena	25, 19
4	Granitas Kaunas	31, 39
5	HC Vilnius	29, 32
2	Dragūnas Klaipėda	44, 43
7	Šiauliai Dubysa	28, 32
3	Almeida-Stronglasas Alytus	36, 34
6	Panevėžys SC-RSSG-Grifas	21, 23

Semifinals
1	VHC Šviesa	31, 29, 37
4	Granitas Kaunas	24, 30, 28
3	Almeida-Stronglasas Alytus	28, 27
2	Dragūnas Klaipėda	27, 26

Finals
1	VHC Šviesa	35, 31, 32
3	Almeida-Stronglasas Alytus	23, 24, 18
Third place
4	Granitas Kaunas	26, 28, 28
2	Dragūnas Klaipėda	34, 26, 34

== Statistics ==
=== Top goalscorers ===
Rank	Name	Team	Goals	Average
1	Tadas Bučinskas	Granitas Kaunas	136	7.6
2	Arminas Stankūnas	Granitas Kaunas	118	5.6
3	Vilius Juozaitis	Almeida-Stronglasas Alytus	118	5.9
4	Vaidas Drevinskas	VHC Šviesa	115	7.2
5	Karolis Antanavičius	VHC Šviesa	111	5.8
6	Mindaugas Urbonas	VHC Šviesa	104	7.4
7	Žygimantas Micevičius	Almeida-Stronglasas Alytus	94	5.9
8	Karolis Grigas	Granitas Kaunas	94	5.5
9	Mantas Zabulis	HC Utena	92	6.1
10	Valdas Drabavičius	VHC Šviesa	91	4.8

Source: Statistika
