= 2021 World Men's Handball Championship – European qualification =

The European qualification for the 2021 World Men's Handball Championship, in Egypt, would have been contested by the teams that did not qualify for the 2020 European Men's Handball Championship and the 20 teams that played the tournament but were not pre-qualified or failed to reach a qualifying ranking place. In total, 34 teams were competing for 10 places at the final tournament.

The qualification tournament was cancelled on 24 April 2020 due to the COVID-19 pandemic, with the EHF announcing the automatic qualification of the ten best-ranked teams in the EHF EURO 2020 that had not secured qualification.

== Format ==
The whole qualification process was different from previous campaigns. Denmark as defending World Champions were already qualified and three best-ranked teams of the 2020 European Men's Handball Championship also booked their direct ticket. Other teams participated in this qualification campaign, which was split into several stages.

Qualification Phase 1 comprised the 15 teams which haven't qualified for the EHF EURO 2020. They were playing a group phase format in the October 2019 and January 2020, with three groups of four nations and one of three. The four group winners advanced to the next phase.

Qualification Phase 2 would have been consisted of two parts. Part 1 would have involved the four group winners from the Phase 1 alongside the four lowest-ranked EHF EURO 2020 teams, which do not take part in the 2020 IHF Men's Olympic Qualification Tournaments. Those eight teams would have played four matches in a two-legged play-off from 15 to 16 and 18 to 19 April 2020. The Part 2, played in June 2020, would have involved four Part 1 winners and the 16 remaining EHF EURO 2020 teams, which haven't qualified already for the final tournament.

== Qualification Phase 1 ==
The draw took place at the EHF Office on 23 July 2019.

=== Group 1 ===
The group was played in a tournament format.

Pos	Team	Pld	W	D	L	GF	GA	GD	Pts	Qualification
1	Lithuania	3	3	0	0	93	71	+22	6	Qualification Phase 2 – Part 1
2	Slovakia	3	2	0	1	73	67	+6	4	
3	Faroe Islands	3	1	0	2	75	85	−10	2	
4	Luxembourg (H)	3	0	0	3	60	78	−18	0	

Source: Eurohandball
Rules for classification: 1) points; 2) head-to-head points; 3) head-to-head goal difference; 4) head-to-head number of goals scored; 5) goal difference.
(H) Hosts

10 January 2020; 17:00	Lithuania	36–25	Faroe Islands	d'Coque, Luxembourg City; Attendance: 100; Referees: Vešović, Mitrović (MNE)
10 January 2020; 17:00	Drabavičius, Malašinskas 5	(18–12)	Selvig 6	d'Coque, Luxembourg City; Attendance: 100; Referees: Vešović, Mitrović (MNE)
10 January 2020; 17:00	1× (yellow card) 4× (suspension)	Report	3× (yellow card) 5× (suspension)	d'Coque, Luxembourg City; Attendance: 100; Referees: Vešović, Mitrović (MNE)

10 January 2020; 19:30	Slovakia	22–16	Luxembourg	d'Coque, Luxembourg City; Attendance: 651; Referees: Nabokau, Kulik (BLR)
10 January 2020; 19:30	Potisk 5	(11–9)	Bock 4	d'Coque, Luxembourg City; Attendance: 651; Referees: Nabokau, Kulik (BLR)
10 January 2020; 19:30	1× (yellow card) 3× (suspension)	Report	3× (yellow card) 5× (suspension)	d'Coque, Luxembourg City; Attendance: 651; Referees: Nabokau, Kulik (BLR)

11 January 2020; 15:00	Faroe Islands	26–27	Slovakia	d'Coque, Luxembourg City; Attendance: 65; Referees: Nabokau, Kulik (BLR)
11 January 2020; 15:00	Johansen 9	(13–14)	Straňovský 9	d'Coque, Luxembourg City; Attendance: 65; Referees: Nabokau, Kulik (BLR)
11 January 2020; 15:00	4× (yellow card) 2× (suspension) 1× (red card)	Report	2× (yellow card) 5× (suspension)	d'Coque, Luxembourg City; Attendance: 65; Referees: Nabokau, Kulik (BLR)

11 January 2020; 17:30	Luxembourg	22–32	Lithuania	d'Coque, Luxembourg City; Attendance: 700; Referees: Vešović, Mitrović (MNE)
11 January 2020; 17:30	Wirtz 10	(10–15)	Malašinskas 8	d'Coque, Luxembourg City; Attendance: 700; Referees: Vešović, Mitrović (MNE)
11 January 2020; 17:30	2× (yellow card) 4× (suspension) 1× (red card)	Report	1× (yellow card) 3× (suspension)	d'Coque, Luxembourg City; Attendance: 700; Referees: Vešović, Mitrović (MNE)

12 January 2020; 15:00	Lithuania	25–24	Slovakia	d'Coque, Luxembourg City; Attendance: 130; Referees: Vešović, Mitrović (MNE)
12 January 2020; 15:00	Malašinskas, Truchanovičius 8	(11–12)	Duriš 7	d'Coque, Luxembourg City; Attendance: 130; Referees: Vešović, Mitrović (MNE)
12 January 2020; 15:00	1× (yellow card) 3× (suspension)	Report	3× (yellow card) 4× (suspension)	d'Coque, Luxembourg City; Attendance: 130; Referees: Vešović, Mitrović (MNE)

12 January 2020; 17:30	Faroe Islands	24–22	Luxembourg	d'Coque, Luxembourg City; Attendance: 1,100; Referees: Nabokau, Kulik (BLR)
12 January 2020; 17:30	Johansen, Thomsen 4	(11–10)	Guden 6	d'Coque, Luxembourg City; Attendance: 1,100; Referees: Nabokau, Kulik (BLR)
12 January 2020; 17:30	2× (yellow card) 6× (suspension)	Report	1× (yellow card) 3× (suspension)	d'Coque, Luxembourg City; Attendance: 1,100; Referees: Nabokau, Kulik (BLR)

=== Group 2 ===
Pos	Team	Pld	W	D	L	GF	GA	GD	Pts	Qualification
1	Israel	6	4	1	1	169	150	+19	9	Qualification Phase 2 – Part 1
2	Greece	6	4	0	2	173	137	+36	8	
3	Finland	6	3	1	2	165	157	+8	7	
4	Cyprus	6	0	0	6	112	175	−63	0	

Source: Eurohandball
Rules for classification: 1) points; 2) head-to-head points; 3) head-to-head goal difference; 4) head-to-head number of goals scored; 5) Goal difference.

23 October 2019; 17:30	Cyprus	18–31	Greece	Eleftheria Stadium, Nicosia; Attendance: 300; Referees: Harabagiu, Stănescu (ROU)
23 October 2019; 17:30	C.Argyrou, J.Argyrou 4	(8–18)	Tziras 8	Eleftheria Stadium, Nicosia; Attendance: 300; Referees: Harabagiu, Stănescu (ROU)
23 October 2019; 17:30	1× (yellow card) 4× (suspension)	Report	3× (yellow card) 2× (suspension)	Eleftheria Stadium, Nicosia; Attendance: 300; Referees: Harabagiu, Stănescu (ROU)

23 October 2019; 18:00	Israel	33–32	Finland	Drive in Arena, Tel Aviv; Attendance: 1,000; Referees: Bíró, Kiss (HUN)
23 October 2019; 18:00	Lumbroso 7	(21–16)	M.Granlund 8	Drive in Arena, Tel Aviv; Attendance: 1,000; Referees: Bíró, Kiss (HUN)
23 October 2019; 18:00	1× (yellow card) 4× (suspension)	Report	3× (suspension)	Drive in Arena, Tel Aviv; Attendance: 1,000; Referees: Bíró, Kiss (HUN)

27 October 2019; 15:00	Finland	30–20	Cyprus	Cocks Areena, Riihimäki; Attendance: 600; Referees: Novikov, Rozhkov (UKR)
27 October 2019; 15:00	Rönnberg 7	(13–15)	Paraskeva 7	Cocks Areena, Riihimäki; Attendance: 600; Referees: Novikov, Rozhkov (UKR)
27 October 2019; 15:00	2× (yellow card) 3× (suspension)	Report	3× (yellow card) 4× (suspension)	Cocks Areena, Riihimäki; Attendance: 600; Referees: Novikov, Rozhkov (UKR)

27 October 2019; 16:00	Greece	26–25	Israel	Lefkovrisi Sports Center, Kozani; Attendance: 800; Referees: Jović, Arnautović (BIH)
27 October 2019; 16:00	Tziras 6	(12–11)	Shkalim 6	Lefkovrisi Sports Center, Kozani; Attendance: 800; Referees: Jović, Arnautović (BIH)
27 October 2019; 16:00	2× (yellow card) 3× (suspension)	Report	3× (yellow card) 4× (suspension)	Lefkovrisi Sports Center, Kozani; Attendance: 800; Referees: Jović, Arnautović (BIH)

2 January 2020; 17:00	Greece	36–22	Finland	Lefkovrisi Sports Center, Kozani; Attendance: 800; Referees: Pandžić, Mošorinski (SRB)
2 January 2020; 17:00	Mallios 7	(17–13)	Helander 6	Lefkovrisi Sports Center, Kozani; Attendance: 800; Referees: Pandžić, Mošorinski (SRB)
2 January 2020; 17:00	2× (yellow card) 3× (suspension)	Report	3× (yellow card) 5× (suspension)	Lefkovrisi Sports Center, Kozani; Attendance: 800; Referees: Pandžić, Mošorinski (SRB)

2 January 2020; 19:00	Cyprus	23–33	Israel	Eleftheria Stadium, Nicosia; Attendance: 300; Referees: Metalari, Nikolovski (MKD)
2 January 2020; 19:00	J.Argyrou 11	(15–13)	Katz 8	Eleftheria Stadium, Nicosia; Attendance: 300; Referees: Metalari, Nikolovski (MKD)
2 January 2020; 19:00	1× (yellow card) 6× (suspension)	Report	1× (yellow card) 3× (suspension)	Eleftheria Stadium, Nicosia; Attendance: 300; Referees: Metalari, Nikolovski (MKD)

4 January 2020; 19:30	Israel	28–21	Cyprus	Drive in Arena, Tel Aviv; Attendance: 1,200; Referees: Yovchev, Yovchev (BUL)
4 January 2020; 19:30	five players 4	(12–10)	J.Argyrou 7	Drive in Arena, Tel Aviv; Attendance: 1,200; Referees: Yovchev, Yovchev (BUL)
4 January 2020; 19:30	3× (yellow card) 3× (suspension)	Report	2× (yellow card) 5× (suspension)	Drive in Arena, Tel Aviv; Attendance: 1,200; Referees: Yovchev, Yovchev (BUL)

5 January 2020; 16:00	Finland	32–28	Greece	Cocks Areena, Riihimäki; Attendance: 600; Referees: Nygaard, Pedersen (DEN)
5 January 2020; 16:00	Rönnberg 11	(16–14)	Mylonas 7	Cocks Areena, Riihimäki; Attendance: 600; Referees: Nygaard, Pedersen (DEN)
5 January 2020; 16:00	3× (yellow card) 5× (suspension)	Report	1× (yellow card) 4× (suspension)	Cocks Areena, Riihimäki; Attendance: 600; Referees: Nygaard, Pedersen (DEN)

8 January 2020; 17:00	Greece	30–16	Cyprus	Lefkovrisi Sports Center, Kozani; Attendance: 500; Referees: Rauchs, Linster (LUX)
8 January 2020; 17:00	Mallios 5	(15–8)	J.Argyrou, Demosthenous 6	Lefkovrisi Sports Center, Kozani; Attendance: 500; Referees: Rauchs, Linster (LUX)
8 January 2020; 17:00	3× (yellow card) 2× (suspension)	Report	1× (yellow card) 3× (suspension)	Lefkovrisi Sports Center, Kozani; Attendance: 500; Referees: Rauchs, Linster (LUX)

8 January 2020; 18:30	Finland	26–26	Israel	Cocks Areena, Riihimäki; Attendance: 600; Referees: Baumgart, Wild (GER)
8 January 2020; 18:30	Rönnberg 10	(12–7)	Levy, Sidi 5	Cocks Areena, Riihimäki; Attendance: 600; Referees: Baumgart, Wild (GER)
8 January 2020; 18:30	4× (yellow card) 7× (suspension)	Report	3× (yellow card) 6× (suspension)	Cocks Areena, Riihimäki; Attendance: 600; Referees: Baumgart, Wild (GER)

11 January 2020; 19:30	Israel	24–22	Greece	Drive in Arena, Tel Aviv; Attendance: 1,800; Referees: Kaludjerović, Vujacić (MNE)
11 January 2020; 19:30	Sidi 7	(11–9)	Arampatzis 6	Drive in Arena, Tel Aviv; Attendance: 1,800; Referees: Kaludjerović, Vujacić (MNE)
11 January 2020; 19:30	2× (yellow card) 7× (suspension) 1× (red card)	Report	2× (yellow card) 3× (suspension)	Drive in Arena, Tel Aviv; Attendance: 1,800; Referees: Kaludjerović, Vujacić (MNE)

12 January 2020; 17:00	Cyprus	14–23	Finland	Eleftheria Stadium, Nicosia; Attendance: 200; Referees: Chrzan, Janas (POL)
12 January 2020; 17:00	J.Argyrou 8	(6–9)	M.Granlund 6	Eleftheria Stadium, Nicosia; Attendance: 200; Referees: Chrzan, Janas (POL)
12 January 2020; 17:00	2× (suspension)	Report	2× (yellow card) 2× (suspension)	Eleftheria Stadium, Nicosia; Attendance: 200; Referees: Chrzan, Janas (POL)

=== Group 3 ===
The group was played in a tournament format.

Pos	Team	Pld	W	D	L	GF	GA	GD	Pts	Qualification
1	Romania	3	3	0	0	90	69	+21	6	Qualification Phase 2 – Part 1
2	Kosovo	3	1	1	1	77	79	−2	3	
3	Georgia	3	1	0	2	73	84	−11	2	
4	Italy (H)	3	0	1	2	75	83	−8	1	

Source: Eurohandball
Rules for classification: 1) points; 2) head-to-head points; 3) head-to-head goal difference; 4) head-to-head number of goals scored; 5) goal difference.
(H) Hosts

10 January 2020; 18:00	Romania	29–24	Georgia	Pala Tedeschi, Benevento; Attendance: 300; Referees: Argyridis, Mouttas (CYP)
10 January 2020; 18:00	Grigoras 9	(16–13)	Chikovani 6	Pala Tedeschi, Benevento; Attendance: 300; Referees: Argyridis, Mouttas (CYP)
10 January 2020; 18:00	3× (yellow card) 3× (suspension)	Report	3× (yellow card) 6× (suspension) 1× (red card)	Pala Tedeschi, Benevento; Attendance: 300; Referees: Argyridis, Mouttas (CYP)

10 January 2020; 20:00	Italy	26–26	Kosovo	Pala Tedeschi, Benevento; Attendance: 600; Referees: Geraets, Geraets (NED)
10 January 2020; 20:00	Arcieri 6	(11–11)	Dedaj 8	Pala Tedeschi, Benevento; Attendance: 600; Referees: Geraets, Geraets (NED)
10 January 2020; 20:00	2× (suspension)	Report	1× (yellow card) 3× (suspension)	Pala Tedeschi, Benevento; Attendance: 600; Referees: Geraets, Geraets (NED)

11 January 2020; 18:00	Kosovo	21–32	Romania	Pala Tedeschi, Benevento; Attendance: 300; Referees: Geraets, Geraets (NED)
11 January 2020; 18:00	Gjuka 7	(7–15)	Botea 7	Pala Tedeschi, Benevento; Attendance: 300; Referees: Geraets, Geraets (NED)
11 January 2020; 18:00	1× (yellow card) 5× (suspension)	Report	1× (yellow card) 3× (suspension)	Pala Tedeschi, Benevento; Attendance: 300; Referees: Geraets, Geraets (NED)

11 January 2020; 20:00	Georgia	28–25	Italy	Pala Tedeschi, Benevento; Attendance: 700; Referees: Argyridis, Mouttas (CYP)
11 January 2020; 20:00	Tskhovrebadze 8	(13–11)	Skatar 7	Pala Tedeschi, Benevento; Attendance: 700; Referees: Argyridis, Mouttas (CYP)
11 January 2020; 20:00	2× (yellow card) 4× (suspension)	Report	2× (yellow card) 2× (suspension)	Pala Tedeschi, Benevento; Attendance: 700; Referees: Argyridis, Mouttas (CYP)

12 January 2020; 16:00	Kosovo	30–21	Georgia	Pala Tedeschi, Benevento; Attendance: 500; Referees: Geraets, Geraets (NED)
12 January 2020; 16:00	Jupa 8	(18–13)	Tskhovrebadze 5	Pala Tedeschi, Benevento; Attendance: 500; Referees: Geraets, Geraets (NED)
12 January 2020; 16:00	1× (yellow card) 7× (suspension)	Report	2× (yellow card) 5× (suspension)	Pala Tedeschi, Benevento; Attendance: 500; Referees: Geraets, Geraets (NED)

12 January 2020; 18:00	Italy	24–29	Romania	Pala Tedeschi, Benevento; Attendance: 1,200; Referees: Argyridis, Mouttas (CYP)
12 January 2020; 18:00	Parisini 5	(12–13)	Botea 8	Pala Tedeschi, Benevento; Attendance: 1,200; Referees: Argyridis, Mouttas (CYP)
12 January 2020; 18:00	1× (yellow card) 1× (suspension)	Report	2× (yellow card) 3× (suspension)	Pala Tedeschi, Benevento; Attendance: 1,200; Referees: Argyridis, Mouttas (CYP)

=== Group 4 ===
The group was played in a tournament format.

Pos	Team	Pld	W	D	L	GF	GA	GD	Pts	Qualification
1	Turkey (H)	2	2	0	0	66	53	+13	4	Qualification Phase 2 – Part 1
2	Belgium	2	1	0	1	49	53	−4	2	
3	Estonia	2	0	0	2	49	58	−9	0	

Source: Eurohandball
Rules for classification: 1) points; 2) head-to-head points; 3) head-to-head goal difference; 4) head-to-head number of goals scored; 5) Goal difference.
(H) Hosts

25 October 2019; 17:00	Estonia	29–33	Turkey	Porsuk Spor Salonu, Eskişehir; Attendance: 1,500; Referees: Mandák, Rudinský (SVK)
25 October 2019; 17:00	three players 7	(14–18)	Pehlivan 11	Porsuk Spor Salonu, Eskişehir; Attendance: 1,500; Referees: Mandák, Rudinský (SVK)
25 October 2019; 17:00	2× (yellow card) 8× (suspension) 1× (red card)	Report	3× (yellow card) 9× (suspension)	Porsuk Spor Salonu, Eskişehir; Attendance: 1,500; Referees: Mandák, Rudinský (SVK)

26 October 2019; 17:00	Belgium	25–20	Estonia	Porsuk Spor Salonu, Eskişehir; Attendance: 900; Referees: Mandák, Rudinský (SVK)
26 October 2019; 17:00	Robyns 5	(11–9)	Patrail 10	Porsuk Spor Salonu, Eskişehir; Attendance: 900; Referees: Mandák, Rudinský (SVK)
26 October 2019; 17:00	3× (yellow card) 6× (suspension)	Report	2× (yellow card) 3× (suspension)	Porsuk Spor Salonu, Eskişehir; Attendance: 900; Referees: Mandák, Rudinský (SVK)

27 October 2019; 17:00	Turkey	33–24	Belgium	Porsuk Spor Salonu, Eskişehir; Attendance: 2,400; Referees: Mandák, Rudinský (SVK)
27 October 2019; 17:00	three players 6	(17–11)	Meulders 7	Porsuk Spor Salonu, Eskişehir; Attendance: 2,400; Referees: Mandák, Rudinský (SVK)
27 October 2019; 17:00	3× (yellow card) 6× (suspension)	Report	3× (yellow card) 3× (suspension)	Porsuk Spor Salonu, Eskişehir; Attendance: 2,400; Referees: Mandák, Rudinský (SVK)

== Qualification Phase 2 ==
=== Part 1 ===
The four group winners from the first qualification phase joined the four lowest-ranked teams from the EHF EURO 2020 (not taking part in the 2020 Olympics qualification tournaments) in the first part of the second qualification phase, which would be played over two legs on 15 and 16 April and 18 and 19 April 2020. The draw took place on 30 January 2020 at the EHF headquarters in Vienna, with the EHF EURO 2020 participants (Pot 1) hosting the teams from the first qualification phase (Pot 2) in the second leg.

The matches were cancelled on 24 April 2020.

Seeding pots

Pot 1	Pot 2
Latvia; Bosnia and Herzegovina; Russia; Poland	Israel; Lithuania; Romania; Turkey

==== Overview ====
On 25 March, the EHF announced that no matches will be played before June due to the coronavirus pandemic.

Team 1	Agg.	Team 2	1st leg	2nd leg
Turkey	M1	Russia	Cancelled	Cancelled
Romania	M2	Bosnia and Herzegovina	Cancelled	Cancelled
Poland	M3	Lithuania	Cancelled	Cancelled
Israel	M4	Latvia	Cancelled	Cancelled

Turkey	Cancelled	Russia	Porsuk Spor Salonu, Eskişehir
	Report		Porsuk Spor Salonu, Eskişehir

Russia	Cancelled	Turkey	Universal Sport Hall Igrovoy, Moscow
	Report		Universal Sport Hall Igrovoy, Moscow

Romania	Cancelled	Bosnia and Herzegovina	Sala Polivalenta Lascăr Pană, Baia Mare
	Report		Sala Polivalenta Lascăr Pană, Baia Mare

Bosnia and Herzegovina	Cancelled	Romania	KSC Bugojno, Bugojno
	Report		KSC Bugojno, Bugojno

Poland	Cancelled	Lithuania	Orlen Arena, Płock
	Report		Orlen Arena, Płock

Lithuania	Cancelled	Poland	Siemens Arena, Vilnius
	Report		Siemens Arena, Vilnius

Israel	Cancelled	Latvia	Drive in Arena, Tel Aviv
	Report		Drive in Arena, Tel Aviv

Latvia	Cancelled	Israel	Vidzemes Olympic Centre, Valmiera
	Report		Vidzemes Olympic Centre, Valmiera

=== Part 2 ===
In the second part of the second qualifying phase, the 16 teams from the EHF EURO 2020 not yet qualified for the final tournament (positions 4 to 20, excluding Denmark) would have joined the four aggregate winners of the first part of the second qualifying phase, which would have been played in home-and-away matches on 5 to 7 June and 9 to 11 June 2020. The ten aggregate winners would have advanced to the 2021 World Men's Handball Championship. The draw was held on 9 March 2020.

The matches were cancelled on 24 April 2020.

Seeding pots

Pot 1	Pot 2
Slovenia; Germany; Portugal; Sweden; Austria; Hungary; Belarus; Iceland; Czech Republic; France	North Macedonia; Switzerland; Netherlands; Montenegro; Ukraine; Serbia; M1; M2; M3; M4

==== Overview ====
The matches were rescheduled due to the coronavirus pandemic.

Team 1	Agg.	Team 2	1st leg	2nd leg
Switzerland	–	Iceland	Cancelled	Cancelled
M4	–	Portugal	Cancelled	Cancelled
Czech Republic	–	Montenegro	Cancelled	Cancelled
Sweden	–	M1	Cancelled	Cancelled
Slovenia	–	Serbia	Cancelled	Cancelled
M2	–	Hungary	Cancelled	Cancelled
North Macedonia	–	France	Cancelled	Cancelled
Ukraine	–	Germany	Cancelled	Cancelled
M3	–	Belarus	Cancelled	Cancelled
Austria	–	Netherlands	Cancelled	Cancelled

Switzerland	Cancelled	Iceland
	Report

Iceland	Cancelled	Switzerland
	Report

M4	Cancelled	Portugal
	Report

Portugal	Cancelled	M4
	Report

Czech Republic	Cancelled	Montenegro
	Report

Montenegro	Cancelled	Czech Republic
	Report

Sweden	Cancelled	M1
	Report

M1	Cancelled	Sweden
	Report

Slovenia	Cancelled	Serbia
	Report

Serbia	Cancelled	Slovenia
	Report

M2	Cancelled	Hungary
	Report

Hungary	Cancelled	M2
	Report

North Macedonia	Cancelled	France
	Report

France	Cancelled	North Macedonia
	Report

Ukraine	Cancelled	Germany
	Report

Germany	Cancelled	Ukraine
	Report

M3	Cancelled	Belarus
	Report

Belarus	Cancelled	M3
	Report

Austria	Cancelled	Netherlands
	Report

Netherlands	Cancelled	Austria
	Report
