= Gintaras Savukynas =

Lithuanian handball coach (born 1971)

Personal information
- Born: 18 February 1971 (age 55) Alytus, Lithuanian SSR
- Height: 185 cm (73 in)

Sport
- Sport: Handball
- Position: Center back
- Current club: HC Motor Zaporizhia

Senior clubs
- Years: Team
- 1990–1996 1996 1996–1997 1997–1998 1998–2001 2001–2002 2002–2003 2003–2004: Granitas Kaunas; GKS Wybrzeże Gdańsk; Kristiansands IF; Granitas Kaunas; UMF Afturelding; HC TV Zofingen; VHC Šviesa; ÍF Grótta
National team
- Years: Team
- 1991–2005: Lithuania

Teams managed
- 2004–2006 2004–2006 2006–2008 2009–2014 2010–2012 2013–2016 2016–2020 2020– 2022–: HC Viking Malt Panevėžys; Lithuania (assistant); ÍBV; Lithuania; HC Meshkov Brest; Bergsøy IL Handball; Riihimäki Cocks; HC Motor Zaporizhia; Lithuania

Gintaras Savukynas (born 18 February 1971) is a professional Lithuanian handball player, who played in center back position. Savukynas played in the World and European championships with the Lithuania National Handball team as the team captain. In 2005, he officially announced the end of his career as a player, to which he became an assistant coach for the Lithuania men's national handball team, before becoming the head of the national handball team for five years.

== Biography ==
Gintaras Savukynas started his career in Granitas Kauno and played there for long period of time. During that time, they won the Lithuanian Handball League six times and Lithuania Handball Cup five times. In 1996, he was loaned out to GKS Wybrzeze Gdansk, a team in the Polish Superliga (the top men's handball league in Poland). During the same year, he also moved to Norway to play for HC Kristiansand IF.

After the successful season in Norway and during the 1997 World Handball Championship in Japan, Savukynas underwent a knee surgery and finished the recovery season with Kauno Granitas, once again winning the Lithuania Handball League. Savukynas was named MVP of the Lithuania Handball League in 1994 and 1998.

After the 1998 season and a successful 1998 European Handball Championship in Italy, Savukynas transferred to UMFA Afturelding in Iceland. While playing for UMFA Afturelding in 1999, he won every possible title in Iceland – Champions Cup, Iceland Handball Cup, Iceland Handball League (for the first and only time in the club history) . In 2000, Savukynas was named as the best offensive player of Iceland Handball league. In 2001, Savukynas moved to play in Switzerland for the top division team TV Zofingen. During that period, Savukynas was one of the top scorers in the league.

In 2002, Savukynas went back to play in Lithuania for Vilnius Šviesa where he helped the club win its first ever bronze medal in history. Savukynas was also selected as the MVP of the Lithuania Handball league for a third time. After this season, he moved to play in Iceland once again for HC Grotta/KR, where he played until the end of his career.

== Coach career ==
Savukynas became the head coach of HC Viking Malt club in Panevėžys after ending his career as a player. The team won the Lithuania Handball Cup for the first time in the club's history. In the second season, they won the Lithuania Handball Cup back to back but lost 2–3 in the Lithuania Handball League final to Kauno Granitas. In the 3rd season (2006), Savukynas won the Lithuania Handball League for the first time as a head coach. They beat Kauno Granitas to end their 16-year dominance in the league. Savukynas was selected as the head coach of the year after winning the title.

In 2006, he went to coach ÍB Vestmannaeyja, who were playing in the second Iceland division. During the first season, Savukynas managed to promote the team back to the top division and was selected as the best head coach in the second division.

In 2009, he became the head coach of the Lithuania men's national handball team. During the qualifying rounds, the team showed strong character and for 3 times, they were one step away from the World Championship.

In 2010, Savukynas was announced as the head coach of newly emerging super club in Belarus HC Meshkov Brest. In the first season, the club won Belarus handball cup and finished second in the Belarus handball league. During the second season Savukynas managed to guide the team to the EHF Cup quarterfinals, finishing second in the Belarus Handball League and played in the Belarus Cup final.

In 2013, he started working in Norway at Bergsøy IL, where he coordinated all the handball functions and also coached the club's men team. After just one season, Savukynas was promoted to the general manager of handball.

In 2016, he moved to Finland HC Riihimaen Cocks where he stayed for 3 1/2 seasons. In the first season, Cocks managed to qualify for the EHF Cup group stage for the first time in the club's history, as well as winning the Baltic Handball League, Finnish Handball League and Finland Handball Cup. In the second season, Savukynas repeated the success of the first season, qualifying the team for the EHF Cup group stage and winning for the 2nd time Baltic Handball League, Finnish Handball League and Finland Handball Cup. In the 3rd season, Riihimaen Cocks debuted in the EHF Champions League and repeated the treble for the 3rd time - Baltic Handball League, Finnish Handball League and Finland Handball Cup. Savukynas was selected as the best coach in Finland twice (2017, 2019). During the 4th season, Savukynas' team played in the EHF Champions league once again.

In 2020 february, he transferred to HC Motor Zaporozhye in Ukraine. The club played in the EHF Champions League group stage in the 2020/2021 season.

== Honours ==
=== As a player ===
- Lithuanian Handball League champion: 1991, 1992, 1993, 1994, 1995, 1996, 1998
- Lithuania handball cup winner: 1991, 1992, 1993, 1994, 1996
- Best Lithuanian Handball League player: 1994, 1998, 2003
- Iceland Handball League champion: 1999
- Iceland handball cup winner: 1999
- Iceland champions cup winner: 1999
- Best offensive player in Iceland Handball League: 2000
- 1997 World Handball Championship Japan 10th place with Lithuania National handball team
- 1998 European Handball Championship Italy 9th place with Lithuania National handball team

=== As a coach ===
- Lithuanian Handball League champion: 2006
- Lithuania handball cup winner: 2004, 2005
- Best coach of Lithuanian Handball League: 2006
- Promotion to Iceland top division: 2007
- Best coach of Iceland 2nd division: 2007
- Belarus Handball Cup winner: 2011
- Quarter final in EHF Cup: 2012
- Baltic handball league champion: 2017, 2018, 2019
- Finnish Handball League champion: 2017, 2018, 2019
- Finland handball cup winner: 2017, 2018, 2019
- EHF Cup group stage: 2016–2017, 2017–2018
- EHF Champions League group stage: 2018–2019, 2019–2020, 2020–2021, 2021–2022
- Best coach of Finnish Handball League: 2017, 2019
- Ukraine Handball league: 2020, 2021
- Ukraine Handball Cup: 2021
- SEHA League: 3rd place (2020-2021)
