= Vilniaus HC Amber =

Lithuanian handball club

- Full name: Vilniaus Handball Club Amber
- Short name: HC Amber
- Founded: 2017; 8 years ago
- Arena: Sport School Tauras
- Head coach: Hleb Artsiukhou
- League: Lietuvos Rankinio Lyga (LRL)
Home	Away

Vilniaus HC Amber is a team handball club from Vilnius, Lithuania. They compete in Lietuvos Rankinio Lyga (LRL) and Baltic Handball League.

Location of Vilniaus HC Amber

== Crest, colours, supporters ==
=== Kits ===
HOME
2019–20	2020–21	2021–22	2023–24

AWAY
2018–19	2023–24

== Team ==
=== Current squad ===
Squad for the 2023–24 season

Vilniaus HC Amber

Goalkeepers

- 12 (Lithuania) Lukas Gurskis
- 16 (Belarus) Arest Mahiliavets

Left Wingers

- 22 (Lithuania) Domantas Ivanauskas
- 77 (Lithuania) Ramojus Mažrimas

Right Wingers

- 7 (Lithuania) Alan Bogdiun
- 8 (Lithuania) Tadas Tumosas

Line Players

- 10 (Lithuania) Justas Čėsna
- 24 (Ukraine) Oleh Ivanchenko
- 27 (Lithuania) Marius Bulkevičius

Central Backs

- 4 (Lithuania) Matas Aukštikalnis
- 5 (Ukraine) Mykyta Litvinenko

Left Backs

- 11 (Lithuania) Gustavas Murauskas
- 20 (Lithuania) Ernestas Stvolas
- 48 (Belarus) Yahor Shymanchuk

Right Backs

- 9 (Belarus) Anton Tsitko
- 13 (Belarus) Yaheni Skrynnik
- 21 (Lithuania) Ernestas Jančiukas

=== Technical staff ===
- Head coach: (Belarus) Hleb Artsiukhou

=== Transfers ===
Transfers for the 2023–24 season

Joining

- (Belarus) Yahor Shymanchuk (LB)
- (Belarus) Yaheni Skrynnik (RB)
- (Ukraine) Mykyta Litvinenko (CB) from (Germany) Eintracht Hildesheim
- (Ukraine) Oleh Ivanchenko (LP) from (Ukraine) HC Donbas
- (Lithuania) Lukas Gurskis (GK) from (France) Bordeaux Bruges Lormont HB
- (Lithuania) Justas Čėsna (LP) from (Lithuania) Dragūnas Klaipėda
- (Lithuania) Ramojus Mažrimas (LW) from (Lithuania) Dragūnas Klaipėda

Leaving

- (Ukraine) Serhii Sedchenko (CB) to (Greece) Pas Aeropos Edessas
- (Egypt) Fathy Mahfouz Ahmed Mahmoud (LB)
- (Lithuania) Karolis Piragis (RW) to (Lithuania) Granitas Kaunas
- (Lithuania) Giedrius Sveklas (LW)
- (Lithuania) Pijus Gatelis (LP)
- (Lithuania) Karolis Arlauskas (GK)
- (Lithuania) Lukas Vanagas (LB)

== EHF ranking ==
As of 6/4/2024

Rank	Team	Points
198	(Bulgaria) HC Lokomotiv Gorna Oryahovitsa	14
199	(Portugal) Madeira Andebol SAD	13
200	(North Macedonia) GRK Tikveš	13
201	(Lithuania) Vilniaus HC Amber	13
137	(Ukraine) HC ZTR Zaporizhzhia	13
138	(Italy) Sport Club Meran Handball	13
139	(Iceland) KA Akureyri	13
