= Bernatonis =

- Lithuanian surname
- m.: Bernatonis
- f.: (unmarried): Bernatonytė
- f.: (married): Bernatonienė

Bernatonis is a Lithuanian surname. Notable people with the surname include:

- Juozas Bernatonis
- Rolandas Bernatonis
- Vytautas Bernatonis (born 1940), Lithuanian engineer and politician
