= Rolandas Bernatonis =

Lithuanian handball player (born 1987)

Personal information
- Nationality: Lithuanian
- Born: 22 January 1987 (age 39) Kaunas, Lithuanian SSR, Soviet Union
- Height: 1.91 m (6 ft 3 in)

Sport
- Sport: Handball
- Position: Left back
- Current club: HC Vilnius
- Number: 4

Senior clubs
- Years: Team
- –2009: Granitas Kaunas
- 2009–2011: CD Bidasoa
- 2011–2014: Helvetia Anaitasuna
- 2014–2016: Fertiberia Puerto Sagunto
- 2016–2017: CSM București
- 2017–2018: BM Granollers
- 2018–2022: DVTK-Eger
- 2022-2023: Club Balonmano Benidorm
- 2023-2024: BM Guadalajara
- 2024-: HC Vilnius
National team
- Years: Team
- –: Lithuania

Rolandas Bernatonis (born 22 January 1987) is a Lithuanian handball player who currently plays for HC Vilnius and the Lithuania national team.

He was one of the best foreign scorers in the 2014–15 and 2015–16 seasons of Liga ASOBAL, scoring a total of 240 goals in 48 games.
