= Lithuania men's national handball team =

National representatives of Lithuanian handball

Lithuania

Information
- Association: Lithuanian Handball Federation
- Coach: Gintaras Savukynas
- Most goals: Aidenas Malašinskas (418)

Colours
1st	2nd

Results

World Championship
- Appearances: 1 (First in 1997)
- Best result: 10th (1997)

European Championship
- Appearances: 2 (First in 1998)
- Best result: 9th (1998)
- Last updated on 22 January 2022.

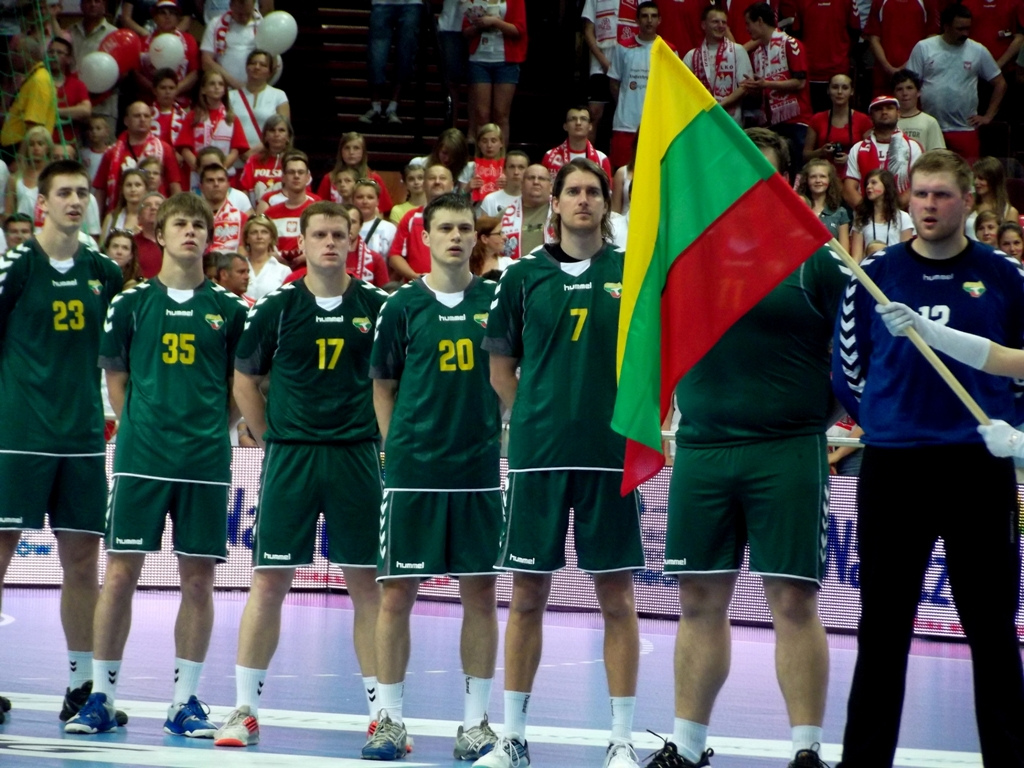
Lithuanian team.

The Lithuania national handball team is the national handball team of Lithuania.

== Competitive record ==
=== World Championship ===
World Championship record
Year	Round	Position	GP	W	D	L	GS	GA
(Nazi Germany) 1938	Part of Soviet Union							
(Sweden) 1954	Part of Soviet Union							
(East Germany) 1958	Part of Soviet Union							
(West Germany) 1961	Part of Soviet Union							
(Czechoslovakia) 1964	Part of Soviet Union							
(Sweden) 1967	Part of Soviet Union							
(France) 1970	Part of Soviet Union							
(East Germany) 1974	Part of Soviet Union							
(Denmark) 1978	Part of Soviet Union							
(West Germany) 1982	Part of Soviet Union							
(Switzerland) 1986	Part of Soviet Union							
(Czechoslovakia) 1990	Part of Soviet Union							
(Sweden) 1993	Did not qualify							
(Iceland) 1995	Did not qualify							
(Japan) 1997	Round of 16	10	6	2	1	3	130	134
(Egypt) 1999	Did not qualify							
(France) 2001	Did not qualify							
(Portugal) 2003	Did not qualify							
(Tunisia) 2005	Did not qualify							
(Germany) 2007	Did not qualify							
(Croatia) 2009	Did not qualify							
(Sweden) 2011	Did not qualify							
(Spain) 2013	Did not qualify							
(Qatar) 2015	Did not qualify							
(France) 2017	Did not qualify							
(Denmark) / (Germany) 2019	Did not qualify							
(Egypt) 2021	Did not qualify							
(Poland) / (Sweden) 2023	Did not qualify							
(Croatia) / (Denmark) / (Norway) 2025	Did not qualify							
(Germany) 2027	TBD							
(France) / (Germany) 2029	TBD							
(Denmark) / (Iceland) / (Norway) 2031	TBD							
Total	1/29	–	6	2	1	3	130	134

=== European Championship ===
European Championship record
Year	Round	Position	GP	W	D	L	GS	GA
(Portugal) 1994	Did not qualify							
(Spain) 1996	Did not qualify							
(Italy) 1998	Preliminary round	9	6	2	1	3	138	151
(Croatia) 2000	Did not qualify							
(Sweden) 2002	Did not qualify							
(Slovenia) 2004	Did not qualify							
(Switzerland) 2006	Did not qualify							
(Norway) 2008	Did not qualify							
(Austria) 2010	Did not qualify							
(Serbia) 2012	Did not qualify							
(Denmark) 2014	Did not qualify							
(Poland) 2016	Did not qualify							
(Croatia) 2018	Did not qualify							
(Austria) / (Norway) / (Sweden) 2020	Did not qualify							
(Hungary) / (Slovakia) 2022	Preliminary round	21	3	0	0	3	82	95
(Germany) 2024	Did not qualify							
(Denmark) / (Norway) / (Sweden) 2026	Did not qualify							
(Portugal) / (Spain) / (Switzerland) 2028	TBD							
(Czech Republic) (Denmark) (Poland) 2030	TBD							
(France) (Germany) 2032	TBD							
Total	2/20	–	9	2	1	6	220	246

== Current squad ==
No.	Pos.	Name	Date of birth (age)	Height	App.	Goals	Club
7	CB	Aidenas Malašinskas					(Ukraine) HC Motor Zaporizhzhia
35	RW	Valdas Drabavičius					(Lithuania) VHC Šviesa
27	CB	Vaidotas Grosas					(Lithuania) Granitas Kaunas
17	LB	Jonas Truchanovičius					(France) Montpellier Handball
21	P	Mindaugas Tarcijonas					(Poland) SPR Tarnów
14	LB	Gerdas Babarskas					(France) Chambéry Savoie Mont-Blanc Handball
88	RB	Mindaugas Dumčius					(Germany) HC Elbflorenz
32	GK	Giedrius Morkūnas					(Finland) Riihimäki Cocks
5	CB	Gabrielius Virbauskas					(Lithuania) Dragūnas Klaipėda
3	LW	Mindaugas Urbonas					(Russia) HBC CSKA Moscow
11	CB	Benas Petreikis					(Germany) EHV Aue
12	GK	Vilius Rašimas					(Germany) EHV Aue
30	p	Benas Butkus					(Lithuania) Dragūnas Klaipėda
15	LB	Lukas Simėnas					(Lithuania) Dragūnas Klaipėda
13	RB	Gytis Šmantauskas					(Lithuania) Dragūnas Klaipėda
20	LW	Skirmantas Plėta					(France) Les Vikings de Caen

=== Notable players ===
- Jonas Truchanovičius 1st Lithuanian to win EHF Champions League

== Notable former coaches ==
- Voldemaras Novickis (1993–2000)
- Gintaras Savukynas (2009–2014, 2022–present)
- Mindaugas Andriuska (2020–2022)
