= Jonas Truchanovičius =

Lithuanian handball player (born 1993)

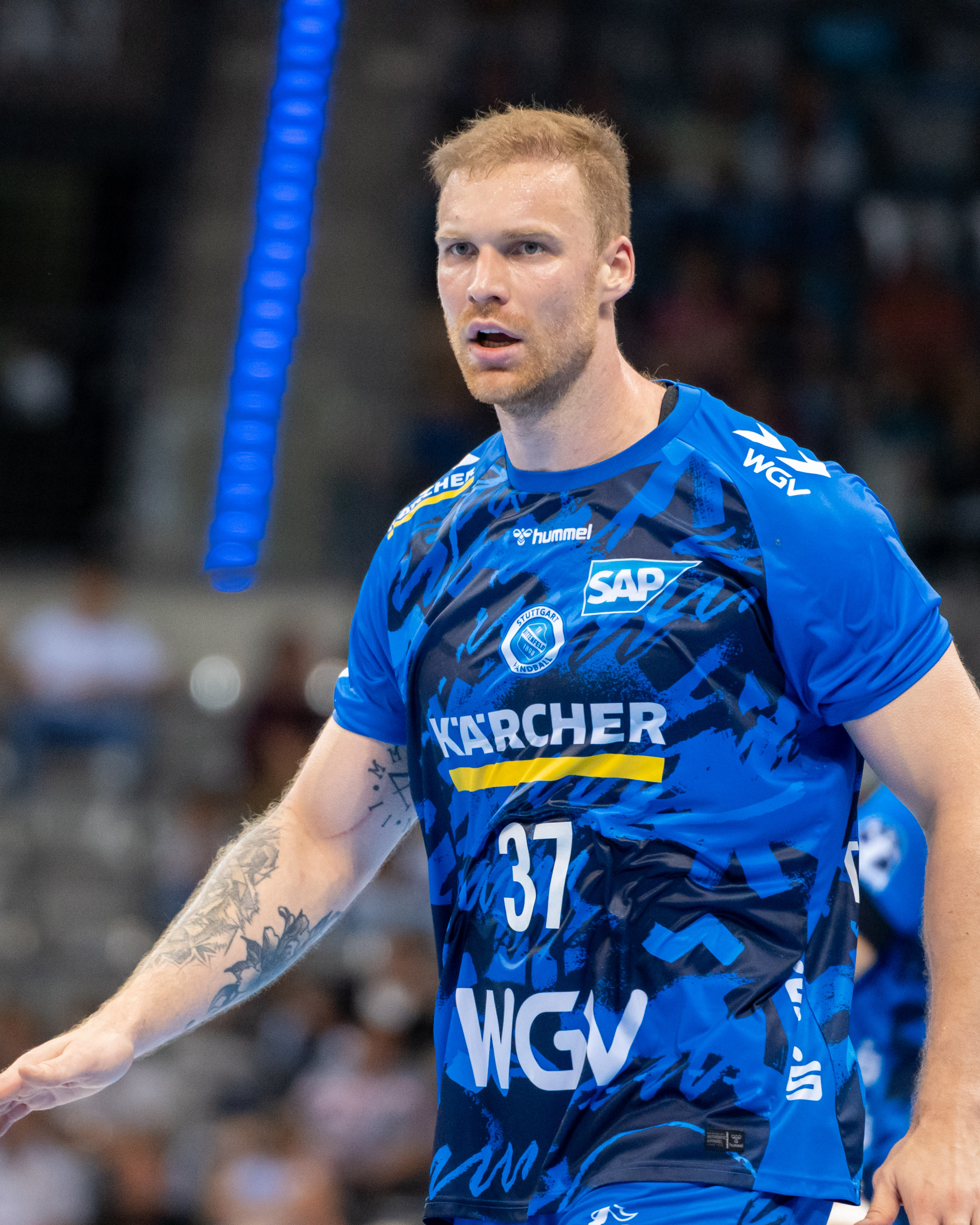

Personal information
- Nationality: Lithuanian
- Born: 24 June 1993 (age 33) Šiauliai, Lithuania
- Height: 2.03 m (6 ft 8 in)

Sport
- Sport: Handball
- Position: Left Back
- Current club: TVB Stuttgart

Senior clubs
- Years: Team
- –2015: (Lithuania) Dragūnas Klaipėda
- 2015–2016: (Austria) Union Leoben
- 2016–2021: (France) Montpellier Handball
- 2021–2023: (Ukraine) HC Motor Zaporizhzhia
- 2023–: (Germany) TVB Stuttgart
National team
Years	Team	Apps	(Gls)
–	Lithuania	42	(113)
- Updated on 7 August 2025

Jonas Truchanovičius (born 23 June 1993) is a Lithuanian handball player who plays for TVB Stuttgart and the Lithuania national team.

== Accomplishments ==
- EHF Champions League: (1)
  - Champion: 2017–18
- Lithuanian Handball League: (5)
  - Champions: 2010, 2011, 2013, 2014, 2015

== Awards ==
- 2020 Lithuanian Male Handball Player of the Year
