= Voldemaras Novickis =

Lithuanian handball player (1956–2022)

Valdemaras Novickis
Personal information
- Born: 22 February 1956 Kalesninkai, Lithuanian SSR, Soviet Union
- Died: 31 January 2022 (aged 65) Kaunas, Lithuania
- Height: 186 cm (73 in)

Sport
- Sport: Handball
- Position: Centre back

Youth career
- Years: Team
- –: Žalgiris Kaunas

Senior clubs
- Years: Team
- 1974–1988: Granitas Kaunas
- 1988–1989: BM Puleva Malaga
- 1989–1990: VfL Bad Schwartau
- 1990–1993: Granitas Kaunas
National team
- Years: Team
- –: Soviet Union

Teams managed
- 1993–2000: Lithuania
- 1993–2019: Granitas Kaunas
Medal record
Men's handball
Representing Soviet Union
Olympic Games
Gold medal – first place	1988 Seoul	Team
Silver medal – second place	1980 Moscow	Team
World Championships
Gold medal – first place	1982 West Germany	Team
Silver medal – second place	1978 Denmark	Team

Valdemaras Novickis (22 February 1956 – 31 January 2022) was a Lithuanian handball player and coach who competed in the 1980 Summer Olympics and in the 1988 Summer Olympics.

== Club career ==
The 1.86 m tall right-hander, who weighed 103 kg when he was playing, began his professional career in his hometown at Žalgiris Kaunas. After moving to city rivals Granitas Kaunas, he was Soviet runner-up in the 1981 and 1985 seasons, and came third in 1979 and 1986 seasons. In 1986/87 he led Granitas as captain to win the IHF Cup with two draws (23:23, 18:18) against Atlético Madrid. Just one year later he lost to HC Minaur Baia Mare (21:20, 20:23) in the final of the 1987/88 IHF Cup. He then moved to Spain to BM Puleva Málaga in the 1988/89 season and from there to Germany to VfL Bad Schwartau, with whom he became champion of the 2nd Bundesliga in 1990. He did not accept a subsequent offer in Denmark and returned to Lithuania. He ended his career at Granitas Kaunas.

== National teams ==
With the Soviet junior selection he was junior world champion in 1977. At the World Championship 1978 he lost with the Soviet men's national handball team to the west German team. Also at the Olympic Games 1980 in Moscow he had to content with silver; here the Soviet team lost to the East German selection. Novickis' participation was in doubt, having broken his leg just two weeks earlier. At the World Championship 1982 he won his first major title. He became world champion with a 30:27 after extra time against Yugoslavia. For the title he received the award Honored Master of Sports of the USSR. In 1985 he defeated the GDR selection in the final of the Supercup in Germany, where he continued to play despite injuries to his hand and leg. In 1986 he was awarded a ban from the national team for half a year, after his return he was then elected captain. At the Olympic Games 1988 in Seoul he became Olympic Champion with the Soviet Union.

He died from cancer in Kaunas on 31 January 2022, at the age of 65.

== Private ==
His son Valdas Novickis is also a handball player.
