= HC Tallinn =

Estonian handball club

- Full name: Käsipalliklubi HC Tallinn
- Short name: Tallinn
- Founded: 2012; 14 years ago
- Arena: Kalevi Spordihall
- Capacity: 1,700
- President: Risto Lepp
- Head coach: Martin Noodla
- League: Meistriliiga
- Club colours
Home	Away

HC Tallinn is an Estonian professional handball team from Tallinn. They compete in Meistriliiga.

Location of HC Tallinn

== Crest, colours, supporters ==
=== Kit manufacturers ===
Period	Kit manufacturer
2019	(United States) Nike
2019–present	(Germany) Adidas

=== Kits ===
HOME
2017–19	2019–20	2021–24

AWAY
2017–19	2019–20	2021–24

== Sports Hall information ==
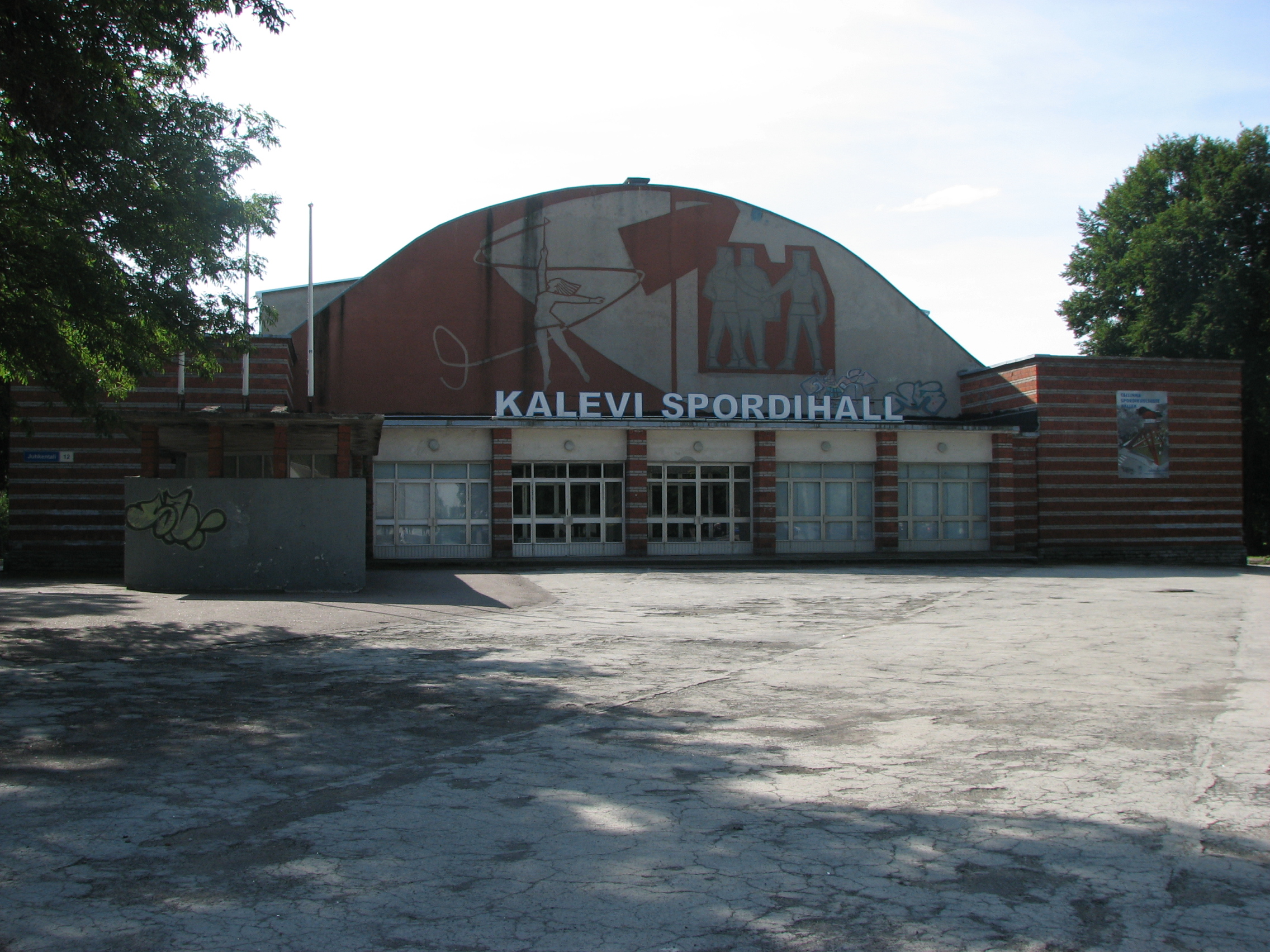
Home hall: Kalevi Spordihall

- Arena: - Kalevi Spordihall
- City: - Tallinn
- Capacity: - 1700
- Address: - Juhkentali 12, 10132 Tallinn, Estonia

== Team ==
=== Current squad ===
Squad for the 2023–24 season

HC Tallinn

Goalkeepers

- 1 (Estonia) Tanel Kütt
- 12 (Estonia) Romet Klement
- 16 (Estonia) Siim Patrael
- 99 (Estonia) Kaspar Kaal

Left Wingers

- 7 (Estonia) Marti Neudorf
- 14 (Estonia) Jesper Linkus
- 22 (Estonia) Marek Karu
- 45 (Estonia) Kasper Saaremets
- 73 (Estonia) Keret Kippari

Right Wingers

- 11 (Estonia) Marten Joorits
- 24 (Russia) Danil Gumyanov
- 25 (Estonia) Karmo Harju

Line Players

- 4 (Estonia) Jaan Pirk
- 8 (Estonia) Kert Liinat
- 9 (Estonia) Hugo Liiv

Central Backs

- 3 (Estonia) Risto Lepp
- 6 (Estonia) Jasper Arnover
- 17 (Estonia) Kalev Kütt
- 32 (Estonia) Matthias Männik
- 88 (Estonia) Erik Matt

Left Backs

- 15 (Estonia) Georg-Gustav Kont
- 23 (Estonia) Andreas Klammer
- 34 (Ukraine) Volodymyr Shcherban
- 77 (Estonia) Markus Oliver Mädo

Right Backs

- 2 (Estonia) Otto Karl Kont
- 10 (Estonia) Romet Nõgene

=== Technical staff ===
- Head Coach: (Estonia) Martin Noodla
- Assistant Coach: (Estonia) Madis Kokkuta

=== Transfers ===
Transfers for the 2023–24 season

Joining

Leaving

- (Estonia) Marius Aleksejev (GK) (retires)

== Accomplishments ==
- Meistriliiga:
  - Silver (2): 2019, 2021
  - Bronze (1): 2022

== EHF ranking ==
As of 06/12/2023

Rank	Team	Points
126	(Lithuania) Dragūnas Klaipėda	37
127	(Netherlands) HV Hurry-Up	37
128	(Greece) A.C. PAOK	36
129	(Estonia) HC Tallinn	36
130	(Switzerland) BSV Bern	36
131	(Switzerland) GC Amicitia Zürich	36
132	(Portugal) Belenenses	36

== Former club members ==
=== Notable former players ===
- (Estonia) Marius Aleksejev (2020–2023)
