= Lithuanian Handball Federation =

Governing body of handball in Lithuania

Lithuanian Handball Federation Lithuanian: Lietuvos Rankinio Federacija LHF
- IOC nation: Republic of Lithuania (LTU)
- Sport: Handball
- Other sports: Beach handball
- Official website: www.rankinis.lt

HISTORY
- Year of formation: 1991; 35 years ago

AFFILIATIONS
- International federation: International Handball Federation (IHF)
- IHF member since: 1991
- Continental association: European Handball Federation
- National Olympic Committee: National Olympic Committee of Lithuania

GOVERNING BODY
- President: Donatas Pasvenskas

HEADQUARTERS
- Address: Aušros g. 42, 44158 Kaunas
- Country: Lithuania
- Secretary General: Miglius Astrauskas

The Lithuanian Handball Federation (Lithuanian: Lietuvos Rankinio Federacija) (LHF) is the administrative and controlling body for handball and beach handball in the Republic of Lithuania. Founded in 1991, the LHF is a member of the European Handball Federation (EHF) and the International Handball Federation (IHF).

== National teams ==
- Lithuania men's national handball team
- Lithuania men's national junior handball team
- Lithuania women's national handball team

== Competitions ==
- Lithuanian Handball League
- Lithuanian Women's Handball League
