= Raasiku/Mistra =

Estonian handball club

- Full name: Raasiku/Mistra Käsipalli Klubi
- Short name: Mistra
- Founded: 2009; 17 years ago
- Arena: Raasiku Spordihoone
- Capacity: 480
- Head coach: Jüri Lepp
- League: Meistriliiga, Baltic Handball League
- Club colours
Home	Away

Raasiku/Mistra is an Estonian professional handball team from Raasiku. They compete in Meistriliiga and Baltic Handball League.

Location of Raasiku/Mistra

== Crest, colours, supporters ==
=== Kit manufacturers ===
Period	Kit manufacturer
2023	(Germany) Adidas
2023–present	(Germany) Kempa

=== Kits ===
HOME
2022-23	2023-24

AWAY
2022-23	2023-24

== Sports Hall information ==
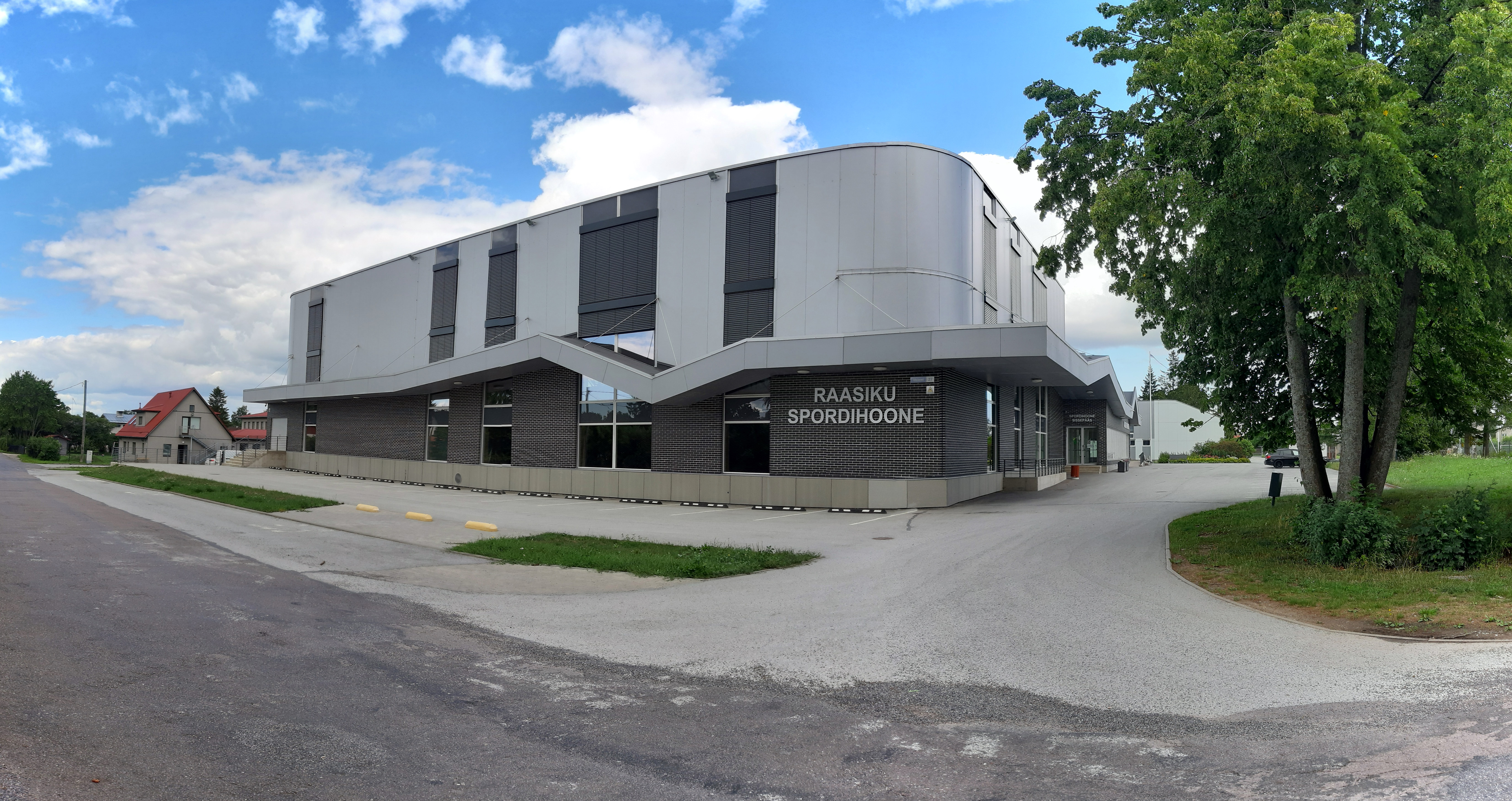
Home hall: Raasiku Spordihoone

- Arena: - Raasiku Spordihoone
- City: - Raasiku
- Capacity: - 480
- Address: - Meierei 27, Raasiku, 75203 Harju maakond, Estonia

== Team ==
=== Current squad ===
Squad for the 2023–24 season

Raasiku/Mistra

Goalkeepers

- 12 (Estonia) Armis Priskus
- 16 (Estonia) Johannes Paju

Left Wingers

- 33 (Estonia) Kaspar Lees
- 38 (Estonia) Patrick Padjus
- 44 (Estonia) Martin Nerut

Right Wingers

- 4 (Estonia) Aron Leppik

Line Players

- 7 (Estonia) Marek Kopli
- 18 (Estonia) Martin Johannson

Central Backs

- 11 (Estonia) Arno Vare
- 20 (Estonia) Risto Kiil
- 24 (Ukraine) Vladislav Naumenko

Left Backs

- 2 (Estonia) Urmas Rõuk
- 6 (Estonia) Martti Viitkar
- 8 (Estonia) Carl-Eric Uibo
- 22 (Ukraine) Sergey Orlovski

Right Backs

- 55 (Estonia) Rauno Kopli

=== Technical staff ===
- Head Coach: (Estonia) Jüri Lepp
- Goalkeeping coach: (Estonia) Mikola Naum

=== Transfers ===
Transfers for the 2026–27 season

Joining

Leaving

=== Transfer History ===
Transfers for the 2025–26 season

Joining

- (Estonia) Karl Roosna (RW) from (Germany) TV Großwallstadt

Leaving

Transfers for the 2023–24 season

Joining

- (Estonia) Martin Johannson (LP) from (Romania) CSA Steaua București
- (Estonia) Kaspar Lees (LW) from (Estonia) SK Tapa
- (Estonia) Carl-Eric Uibo (LB) from (Estonia) Põlva Serviti

Leaving

== Accomplishments ==
- Estonian Cup:
  - Gold (1): 2023

== EHF ranking ==
As of 05/12/2025

Rank	Team	Points
111	(Romania) HC Buzău	41
112	(Azerbaijan) Kur Mingachevir	40
113	(Austria) Bregenz Handball	40
114	(Estonia) Raasiku/Mistra	40
115	(Luxembourg) Handball Esch	39
116	(France) PAUC Aix-en-Provence	38
117	(Kosovo) KB Rahoveci	38
