= Aidenas Malašinskas =

Lithuanian handball player (born 1986)

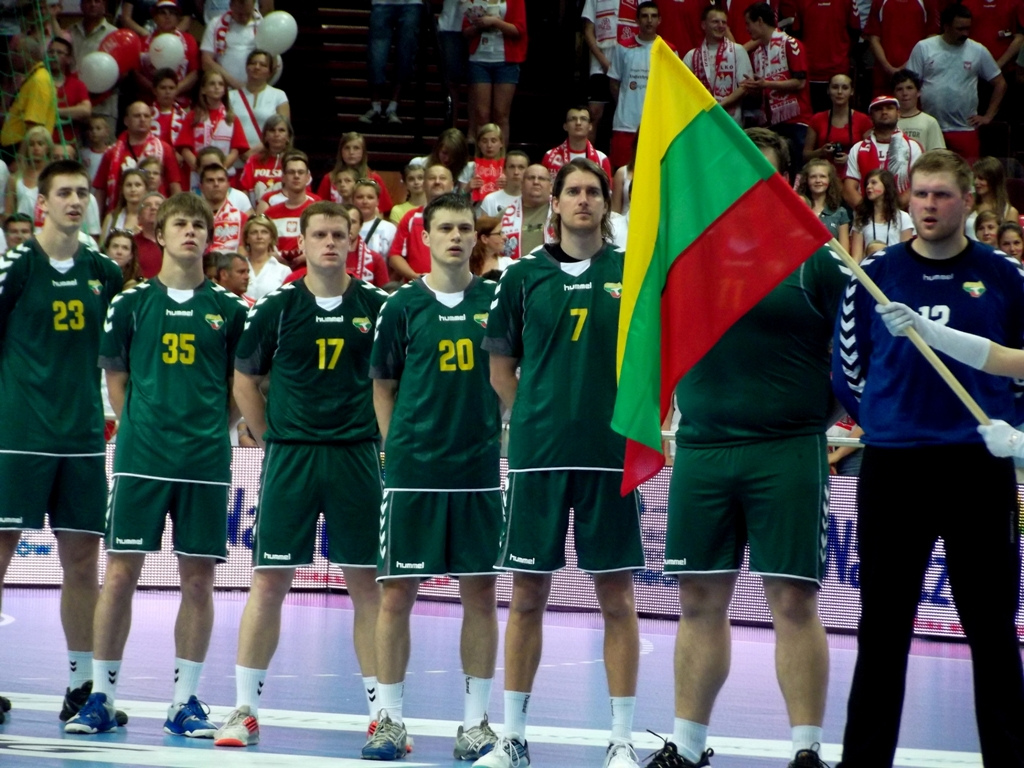

Personal information
- Nationality: Lithuanian
- Born: 29 April 1986 (age 40) Utena, Lithuanian SSR, Soviet Union
- Height: 1.92 m (6 ft 4 in)

Sport
- Sport: Handball
- Position: Central Back
- Current club: HC Buzău
- Number: 75

Senior clubs
- Years: Team
- 2005–2007: Lūšis Kaunas
- 2007–2009: Granitas Kaunas
- 2009–2010: Bidasoa Irun
- 2010–2013: BM Granollers
- 2013–2014: CB Ciudad de Logroño
- 2014–2015: BM Puerto Sagunto
- 2015–2022: HC Motor Zaporizhzhia
- 2022: → CB Ademar León
- 2022–2023: MT Melsungen
- 2023–: HC Buzău
National team
Years	Team	Apps	(Gls)
–	Lithuania	95	(441)
- Updated on 4 July 2023

Aidenas Malašinskas (born 29 April 1986) is a Lithuanian handball player who plays for HC Buzău and the Lithuania national team.

Was honored as best Lithuanian handball player of 2021.
