= Viljandi HC =

Estonian handball club

- Full name: Viljandi HC Käsipalli Klubi
- Short name: Viljandi
- Founded: 1991; 35 years ago
- Arena: Viljandi Spordihoone
- Capacity: 680
- Head coach: Marko Koks
- League: Meistriliiga, Baltic Handball League
- Club colours

Viljandi HC is an Estonian handball team from Viljandi. They compete in Meistriliiga and Baltic Handball League.

Location of Viljandi HC

== Sports Hall information ==
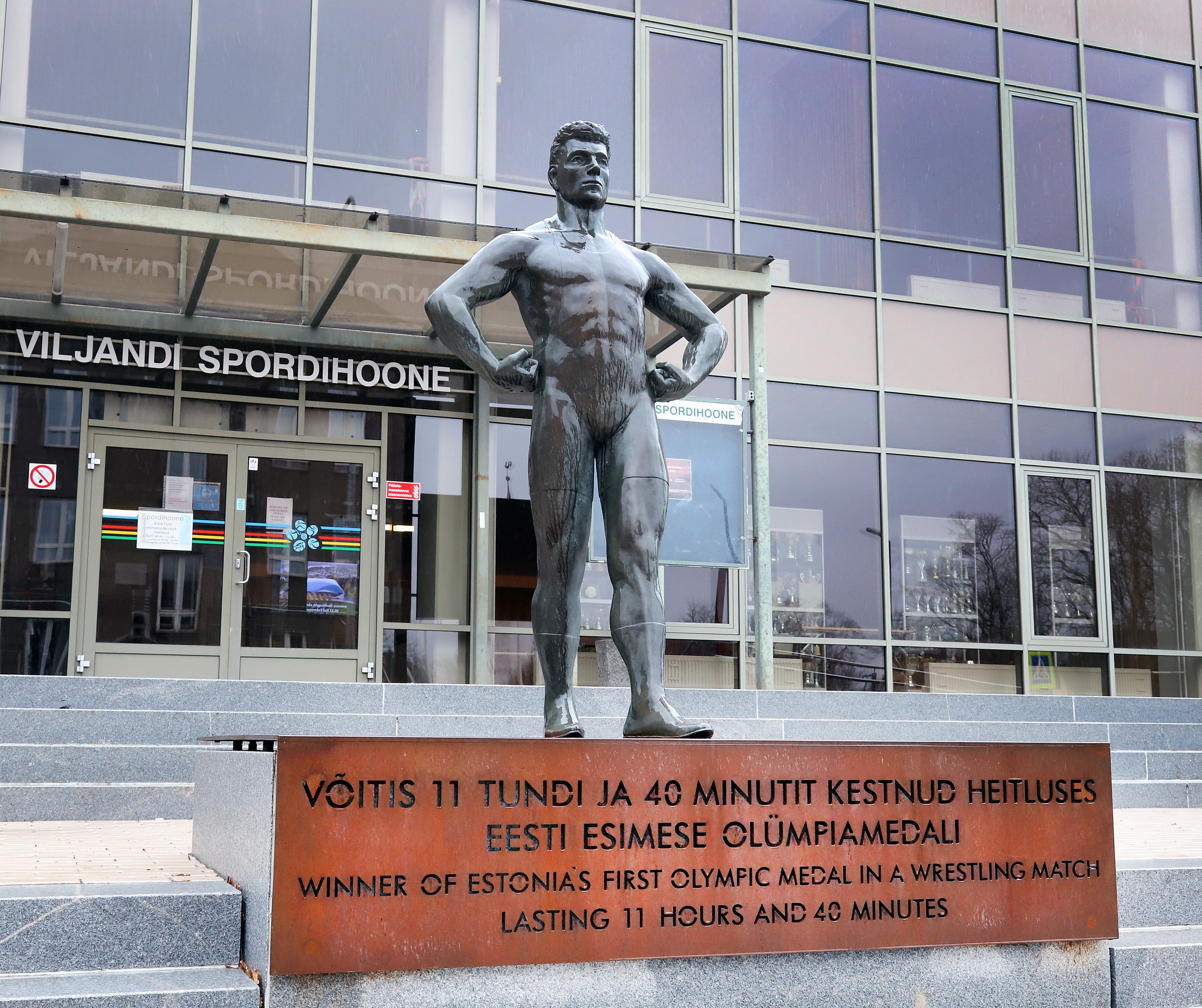
Home hall: Viljandi Spordihoone

- Arena: - Viljandi Spordihoone
- City: - Viljandi
- Capacity: - 680
- Address: - Vaksali 4, Viljandi, 71020 Viljandi maakond, Estonia

== Team ==
=== Current squad ===
Squad for the 2023–24 season

Viljandi HC

Goalkeepers

- 1 (Estonia) Averi Hännile
- 12 (Estonia) Rasmus Ots
- 16 (Estonia) Peeter Parik

Left Wingers

- 5 (Estonia) Kristofer-Robin Soomets
- 8 (Estonia) Mikk Varik
- 11 (Estonia) Martin Braun
- 18 (Estonia) Johannes Pertelson

Right Wingers

- 24 (Estonia) Oliver Ruut
- 90 (Estonia) Ott Varik

Line Players

- 4 (Estonia) Kristjan Koovit
- 7 (Estonia) Simon Drõgin
- 14 (Estonia) Robin Liinsoo

Central Backs

- 6 (Estonia) Kristjan Heinla
- 9 (Estonia) Hendrik Koks
- 17 (Estonia) Jaan-Paul Varik
- 47 (Estonia) Kristo Voika (c)

Left Backs

- 3 (Estonia) Aleksander Pertelson
- 19 (Estonia) Karl-Vahur Vahemets
- 23 (Estonia) Rando Sein

Right Backs

- 10 (Estonia) Sten Maasalu
- 13 (Ukraine) Andriy Basarab

=== Technical staff ===
- Head Coach: (Estonia) Marko Koks

=== Transfers ===
Transfers for the 2025–26 season

Joining

- (Estonia) Ott Varik (RW) from (Iceland) KA

Leaving

== Accomplishments ==
- Baltic Handball League:
  - Gold (1): 2022
  - Silver (1): 2023
- Meistriliiga:
  - Silver (3): 2016, 2017, 2022
  - Bronze (7): 1997, 1998, 2003, 2012, 2014, 2015, 2018
- Estonian Cup:
  - Gold (1): 2014

== EHF ranking ==
As of 05/12/2025

| Rank | Team | Points |
|---|---|---|
| 147 | (Finland) Riihimäki Cocks | 27 |
| 148 | (Iceland) ÍBV | 27 |
| 149 | (Austria) SG Westwien | 26 |
| 150 | (Estonia) Viljandi HC | 26 |
| 151 | (Spain) BM Cuenca | 26 |
| 152 | (Faroe Islands) VÍF | 26 |
| 153 | (Croatia) RK Spačva Vinkovci | 26 |

== Former club members ==
=== Notable former players ===
- (Estonia) Karl Toom (2011–2016)
