= Baltic Handball League =

Handball tournament held between the top clubs from Baltic states

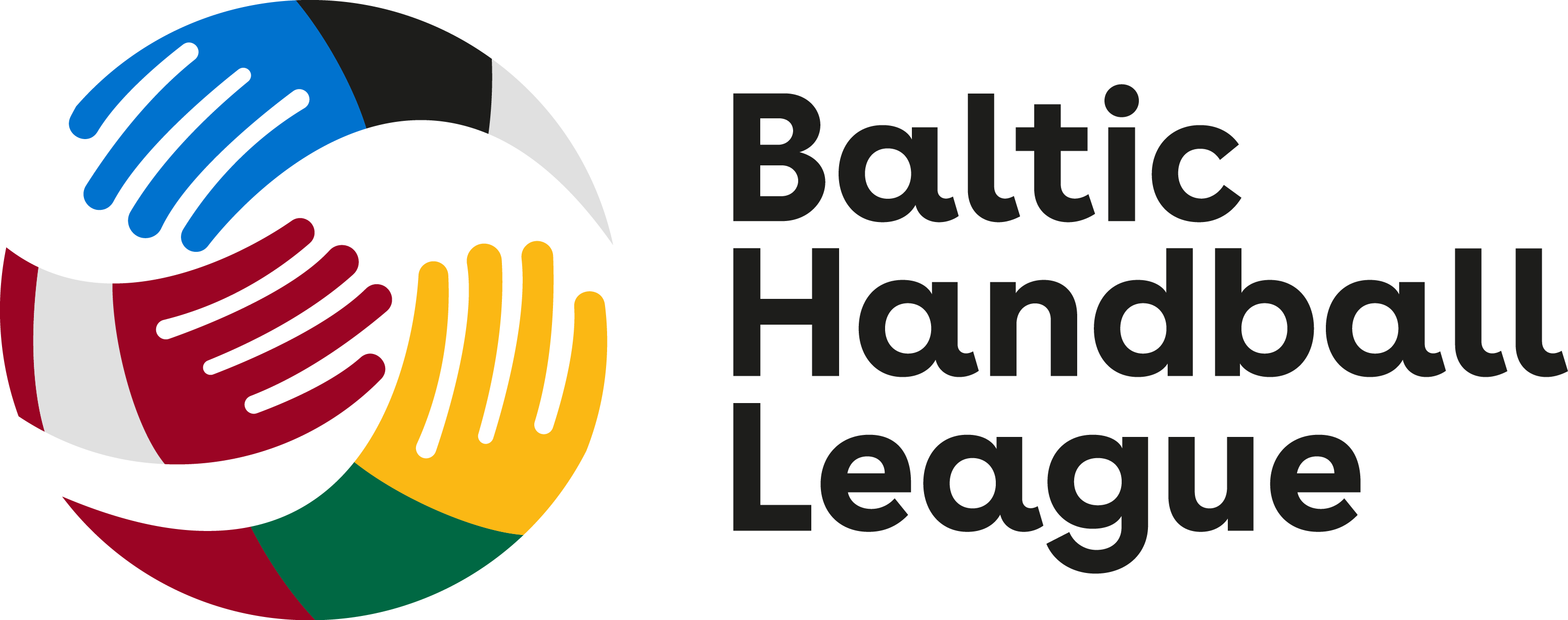

Baltic Handball League is a handball league, where participate the strongest clubs from Baltic states. The league is organized by Baltic Handball Association. The league is established in the beginning of 1990s.

== Participated clubs ==
=== 2023/2024 season ===
- Põlva Serviti
- Viljandi HC
- ZRHK Tenax Dobele
- VHC Šviesa
- Raasiku/Mistra
- Granitas-Karys
- MSĢ
- ASK Zemessardze/LSPA
- HC Dragunas

Participated clubs (as of 2020):

1. Põlva Serviti
2. ZRHK Tenax Dobele
3. VHC Šviesa
4. Celtnieks Rīga
5. Dragūnas Klaipėda
6. HC Kehra / Horizon Pulp & Paper
7. Viljandi HC
8. Varsa-Stronglasas Alytus
9. Granitas Kaunas
10. SK Tapa / N.R. Energy
11. SK Latgols Ludza
12. HK Ogre.

== Winners ==
- 1991 Granitas Kaunas
- 1992 Granitas Kaunas
- 1993 SKA Minsk
- 1994 Granitas Kaunas
- 1995 Granitas Kaunas
- 1996 Granitas Kaunas
- 1997 SKA Minsk
- 1998 SKA Minsk
- 1999 SKA Minsk
- 2000 SKA Minsk
- 2001 SKA Minsk
- 2002 HK ASK Riga
- 2003 HK ASK Riga
- 2004 HK ASK Riga
- 2005 Neva Saint Petersburg
- 2006 HC Kehra
- 2007 HK ASK Riga
- 2008 Põlva Serviti
- 2009 HC Dinamo Minsk
- 2010 Põlva Serviti
- 2011 HC Kehra
- 2012 HC Kehra
- 2013 SKA Minsk
- 2014 SKA Minsk
- 2015 SKA Minsk
- 2016 Riihimäki Cocks
- 2017 Riihimäki Cocks
- 2018 Riihimäki Cocks
- 2019 Riihimäki Cocks
- 2020 not decided due to COVID-19 pandemic.
- 2021 HC Dragunas Klaipeda
- 2022 Viljandi HC
- 2023 Põlva Serviti
- 2024 ZRHK Tenax Dobele
- 2025 Põlva Serviti
