= HC Vilnius =

Lithuanian handball club

- Full name: Vilnius Handball Centre Vilnius
- Short name: HC Vilnius
- Founded: July 29, 2004; 21 years ago
- Arena: ERP Handball Hall
- League: LHL
- Club colours
Home	Away

HC Vilnius is a team handball club from Vilnius, Lithuania. Currently club is competing in Lithuanian Handball League.

The team was founded on 29 July 2004.

== Crest, colours, supporters ==
=== Kits ===
HOME
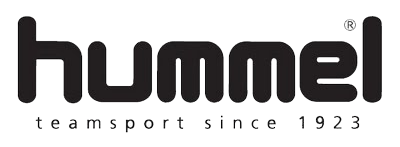
2019–20

== Accomplishments ==
- LHL:1st
  - 2006
