= Lithuanian Handball League =

- Sport: Handball
- Founded: 1990 (unofficial); 1992 (official)
- No. of teams: 7
- Country: Lithuania
- Confederation: EHF
- Most recent champion: Dragūnas Klaipėda (2025–26)
- Most titles: Granitas Kaunas (17)
- Website: www.rankiniolyga.lt

The Lithuanian Handball League (Lithuanian: Lietuvos rankinio lyga), is the top-tier team handball competition in the Republic of Lithuania.

The following 7 clubs compete in the Lietuvos Rankinio Lyga (LRL) during the 2023–24 season.

Team	City	Arena
Alytaus Varsa - Stronglasas	Alytus	Alytus Arena
HC Vilnius	Vilnius	HC Vilnius sporto salė
Granitas Kaunas	Kaunas	Kaunas Sports Hall
Dragūnas Klaipėda	Klaipėda	SBVC Didžioji salė
Panevėžio SC – RSSG Grifas	Panevėžys	Panevėžio rankinio centras
Vilniaus HC Amber	Vilnius	Sport School Tauras
VHC Šviesa	Vilnius	Sport School Tauras

== Lithuanian Handball League past champions ==
- 1991 : Granitas Kaunas
- 1992 : Granitas Kaunas (2)
- 1993 : Granitas Kaunas (3)
- 1994 : Granitas Kaunas (4)
- 1995 : Granitas Kaunas (5)
- 1996 : Granitas Kaunas (6)
- 1997 : Granitas Kaunas (7)
- 1998 : Granitas Kaunas (8)
- 1999 : Granitas Kaunas (9)
- 2000 : Granitas Kaunas (10)
- 2001 : Granitas Kaunas (11)
- 2002 : Granitas Kaunas (12)
- 2003 : Granitas Kaunas (13)
- 2004 : Granitas Kaunas (14)
- 2005 : Granitas Kaunas (15)
- 2006 : Panevėžio Viking Malt
- 2007 : Panevėžio Viking Malt (2)
- 2008 : Granitas Kaunas (16)
- 2009 : Granitas Kaunas (17)
- 2010 : Dragūnas Klaipėda
- 2011 : Dragūnas Klaipėda (2)
- 2012 : Dragūnas Klaipėda (3)
- 2013 : Dragūnas Klaipėda (4)
- 2014 : Dragūnas Klaipėda (5)
- 2015 : Dragūnas Klaipėda (6)
- 2016 : Varsa Alytus
- 2017 : Dragūnas Klaipėda (7)
- 2018 : Dragūnas Klaipėda (8)
- 2019 : Dragūnas Klaipėda (9)
- 2020 : Cancelled
- 2021 : VHC Šviesa (1)
- 2022 : VHC Šviesa (2)
- 2023 : VHC Šviesa (3)
- 2024 : VHC Šviesa (4)
- 2025 : Dragūnas Klaipėda (10)
- 2026 : Dragūnas Klaipėda (11)

	Club	Titles	Year
1.	Granitas Kaunas	17	1991, 1992, 1993, 1994, 1995, 1996, 1997, 1998, 1999, 2000, 2001, 2002, 2003, 2004, 2005, 2008, 2009
2.	Dragūnas Klaipėda	10	2010, 2011, 2012, 2013, 2014, 2015, 2017, 2018, 2019, 2025, 2026
3.	VHC Šviesa	4	2021, 2022, 2023, 2024
4.	Panevėžio Viking Malt	2	2006, 2007
5.	Varsa Alytus	1	2016
