= VHC Šviesa =

Lithuanian handball club

- Full name: Vilnius Handball Centre Šviesa
- Founded: 2002; 24 years ago
- Arena: Sport School Tauras
- President: Marius Devyžis
- Head coach: Žygimantas Sinkevičius
- League: Lietuvos Rankinio Lyga (LRL)
- Club colours
Home	Away

VHC Šviesa is a men's professional team handball club from Vilnius, Lithuania. They compete in Lietuvos Rankinio Lyga (LRL) and Baltic Handball League.

Location of VHC Šviesa

== Crest, colours, supporters ==
=== Kit manufacturers ===
Period	Kit manufacturer
2017	(Germany) Erima
2017 - present	(Germany) Adidas

=== Kits ===
HOME
2016–17	2017–18	2018–19	2019–20	2020–21	2021–22	2022–23	2023–24

AWAY
2016–17	2017–18	2018–19	2019–20	2020–21	2021–22	2022–23	2023–24

== Team ==
=== Current squad ===
Squad for the 2023–24 season

VHC Šviesa

Goalkeepers

- 1 (Lithuania) Ricardas Bilinskis
- 12 (Lithuania) Matas Pranckevičius
- 32 (Lithuania) Giedrius Morkūnas

Left Wingers

- 4 (Lithuania) Taurintas Markiavičius
- 8 (Lithuania) Adas Maželis
- 10 (Lithuania) Skirmantas Plėta
- 20 (Lithuania) Ignas Jonuška
- 99 (Lithuania) Mantas Urvikis

Right Wingers

- 3 (Lithuania) Marius Miškinis
- 11 (Lithuania) Laurynas Palevičius
- 35 (Lithuania) Valdas Drabavičius

Line Players

- 31 (Lithuania) Šarūnas Ugianskis
- 37 (Lithuania) Domantas Pukas
- 66 (Lithuania) Rokas Žiliukas

Central Backs

- 2 (Lithuania) Matas Maželis
- 17 (Lithuania) Karolis Antonovičius
- 33 (Lithuania) Tadas Rasakevičius
- 34 (Lithuania) Karolis Bliuvas
- 77 (Lithuania) Rytis Paškevičius

Left Backs

- 7 (Lithuania) Grantas Aniulis
- 13 (Lithuania) Tomas Bernatavičius

Right Backs

- 5 (Lithuania) Eimantas Sinkevičius

=== Technical staff ===
- Head Coach: (Lithuania) Žygimantas Sinkevičius
- Goalkeeping Coach: (Lithuania) Darius Čivilis
- Coach: (Lithuania) Raimondas Maldžius
- Physiotherapist: (Lithuania) Deimante Grinceviciute
- Physiotherapist: (Lithuania) Paulius Rakauskas
- Physiotherapist: (Lithuania) Karolis Tuska

=== Transfers ===
Transfers for the 2023–24 season

Joining

- (Lithuania) Matas Pranckevičius (GK) from (Iceland) Haukar Handball

Leaving

- (Lithuania) Edmundas Pelėda (GK)
- (Lithuania) Karolis Ubeika (LP)

== Accomplishments ==
- Baltic Handball League:
  - Silver (1): 2021
  - Bronze (2): 2011, 2022
- Lietuvos Rankinio Lyga (LRL):
  - Gold (3): 2021, 2022, 2023, 2024
  - Silver (3): 2014, 2018, 2019
  - Bronze (3): 2003, 2004, 2015

== EHF ranking ==
As of 6/4/2024

Rank	Team	Points
133	(France) Saint-Raphaël VHB	36
134	(North Macedonia) HC Butel Skopje	36
135	(Croatia) HRK Gorica	35
136	(Lithuania) VHC Šviesa	35
137	(Serbia) RK Metaloplastika	35
138	(North Macedonia) RK Metalurg Skopje	34
139	(Sweden) HK Malmö	34

== Former club members ==
=== Notable former players ===
- (Lithuania) Karolis Antanavičius (2017–2021)
- (Lithuania) Gintaras Savukynas (2002–2003)
