= Dragūnas Klaipėda =

Lithuanian handball club

- Full name: Rankinio Klubas Dragūnas Klaipėda
- Short name: Dragūnas
- Founded: 1999; 26 years ago
- Head coach: Gintaras Cibulskis
- League: Lietuvos Rankinio Lyga (LRL)
- Club colours
Home	Away

Dragūnas Klaipėda is a team handball club from Klaipėda, Lithuania. They compete in Lietuvos Rankinio Lyga (LRL) and Baltic Handball League.

Location of Dragūnas Klaipėda

== Crest, colours, supporters ==
=== Kits ===
HOME
2016–17	2017–18	2018–19	2019–21

AWAY
2016–17	2017–18	2018–19	2019–21

== Team ==
=== Current squad ===
Squad for the 2023–24 season

Dragūnas Klaipėda

Goalkeepers

- 12 (Ukraine) Maksim Lobchuk
- 22 (Lithuania) Benediktas Pakalniškis

Left Wingers

- 4 (Lithuania) Laurynas Simonavičius
- 21 (Lithuania) Paulius Čėsna

Right Wingers

- 10 (Lithuania) Mykolas Lapiniauskas
- 13 (Lithuania) Titas Paulikas

Line Players

- 2 (Ukraine) Vladyslav Korzhuk
- 5 (Lithuania) Arvydas Bučius
- 23 (Lithuania) Vaidotas Slinksis
- 38 (Lithuania) Giedrius Budginas

Central Backs

- 19 (Lithuania) Tomas Draksas

Left Backs

- 3 (Ukraine) Igor Odinokov
- 33 (Ukraine) Daniil Plakhotin
- 37 (Lithuania) Matas Kairys
- 55 (Lithuania) Karolis Stropus

Right Backs

- 25 (Lithuania) Gytis Šmantauskas

=== Technical staff ===
- Head Coach: (Lithuania) Gintaras Cibulskis
- Coach: (Lithuania) Arturas Juskenas
- Coach: (Lithuania) Rasa Juškėnienė
- Coach: (Lithuania) Roberta Strope
- Coach: (Lithuania) Karolis Stropus
- Physiotherapist: (Lithuania) Sarunas Jurksys

=== Transfers ===
Transfers for the 2023–24 season

Joining

Leaving

- (Ukraine) Sayed Navid Naghavialhosseini (RB) to (Italy) Pallamano Secchia Rubiera
- (Lithuania) Justas Čėsna (LP) to (Lithuania) Vilniaus HC Amber
- (Lithuania) Ramojus Mažrimas (LW) to (Lithuania) Vilniaus HC Amber
- (Lithuania) Orestas Biknius (RW)
- (Lithuania) Rokas Palskys (LB)
- (Lithuania) Edvinas Bruckus (CB)
- (Lithuania) Ignas Savičius (RB)

== Accomplishments ==
- Baltic Handball League:
  - Gold (1): 2021
  - Bronze (1): 2012
- Lietuvos Rankinio Lyga (LRL):
  - Gold (9): 2010, 2011, 2012, 2013, 2014, 2015, 2017, 2018, 2019, 2025
  - Silver (3): 1992, 2016, 2023
  - Bronze (5): 1993, 1994, 1998, 2021, 2022

== EHF ranking ==
As of 29/3/2024

Rank	Team	Points
124	(Netherlands) HV Hurry-Up	37
125	(Austria) HC Linz AG	37
126	(Italy) Raimond Handball Sassari	37
127	(Lithuania) Dragūnas Klaipėda	37
128	(Greece) A.C. PAOK	36
129	(Switzerland) BSV Bern	36
130	(Switzerland) GC Amicitia Zürich	36

== Former club members ==
=== Notable former players ===
- (Lithuania) Gintaras Cibulskis (2016–2022)
- (Lithuania) Mindaugas Dumčius (2011–2016)
- (Lithuania) Tomas Eitutis (2011)
- (Lithuania) Marius Kasmauskas (-2001)
- (Lithuania) Benas Petreikis (2008-2014)
- (Lithuania) Lukas Simėnas (2015-2020)
- (Lithuania) Jonas Truchanovičius (2010–2015)
- (Lithuania) Žanas Virbauskas (2017-2021)
