= Granitas Kaunas =

Lithuanian handball club

Granitas-Karys
- Full name: Kauno Rankinio Klubas Granitas-Karys
- Short name: Granitas
- Founded: 1959
- Arena: Kauno Rajono Sporto Centras
- Head coach: Vaidotas Grosas
- League: Lietuvos Rankinio Lyga (LRL)
- Club colours
Home	Away

Granitas-Karys is a team handball club from Kaunas, Lithuania. They compete in Lietuvos Rankinio Lyga (LRL) and Baltic Handball League. Granitas-Karys is the most successful team in Lithuania Handball history.

Location of Granitas-Karys

== History ==
In 1963 the club won the Soviet championship.

In 1987 the club won the IHF Cup. The trophy was won by the two coaches Antanas Skarbalius and Modestas Prakapas and the players Valdemaras Novickis, Raimondas Valuckas, Gediminas Mikulėnas, Stasys Vasiliauskas, Romas Dumbliauskas, Algis Mockeliūnas, Eugeninus Miknius, Valius Babarskas, Vytautas Milašiūnas, Jonas Kaučikas, Remigijus Cikanauskas, Pranas Vaitonis, Tautrimas Tautkevičius, Laisvydas Jankevičius, Arnoldas Čepulis, Michailas Juska, Algis Mikučionis, Kastytis Čebatorius and Robertas Narkus.

== Team ==
=== Current squad ===
Squad for the 2023–24 season

Granitas-Karys

Goalkeepers

- 12 (Lithuania) Berkantas Drungilas
- 20 (Lithuania) Karolis Videika

Left Wingers

- 4 (Lithuania) Martynas Gidraitis
- 9 (Lithuania) Klaudijus Pausa
- 37 (Lithuania) Deividas Jovaišas

Right Wingers

- 14 (Lithuania) Marius Kairys
- 19 (Lithuania) Karolis Piragis

Line Players

- 11 (Lithuania) Benas Barsenas
- 24 (Lithuania) Andrius Montvilas

Central Backs

- 8 (Lithuania) Gustas Rinkevičius
- 23 (Lithuania) Titas Janušonis
- 77 (Lithuania) Manvydas Lazauskas

Left Backs

- 28 (Lithuania) Modestas Štarolis
- 29 (Lithuania) Karolis Remeikis

Right Backs

- 10 (Lithuania) Nedas Buronko
- 17 (Lithuania) Matas Jurkevičius

=== Technical staff ===
- Head Coach: (Lithuania) Vaidotas Grosas
- Assistant Coach: (Lithuania) Vladas Tomkevičius
- Physiotherapist: (Lithuania) Arminas Petrauskas
- Masseur: (Lithuania) Audrius Bitkauskas

=== Transfers ===
Transfers for the 2023–24 season

Joining

Leaving

- (Lithuania) Tomas Švlepa (GK)
- (Lithuania) Lukas Kraulaidys (LW)
- (Lithuania) Paulius Zeringis (LP)
- (Lithuania) Vladas Tomkevičius (LP)
- (Lithuania) Paulius Šarkauskas (LB)
- (Lithuania) Pijus Eiva (LB)
- (Lithuania) Eitvydas Balkus (LB)
- (Lithuania) Lukas Feoktistovas (CB)
- (Lithuania) Karolis Grigas (RB)

== Accomplishments ==
- EHF Cup:
  - Gold (1): 1987
  - Silver (1): 1988
- Lietuvos Rankinio Lyga (LRL):
  - Gold (17): 1991, 1992, 1993, 1994, 1995, 1996, 1997, 1998, 1999, 2000, 2001, 2002, 2003, 2004, 2005, 2008, 2009
  - Silver (2): 2012, 2022
  - Bronze (6): 2007, 2010, 2016, 2017, 2018, 2023
- Lithuanian Handball Cup:
  - Gold (11): 1990, 1993, 1994, 1995, 1996, 1997, 1998, 2002, 2003, 2016, 2018
- Baltic Handball League:
  - Bronze (2): 2004, 2005
- Soviet Men's Handball Championship
  - Gold (1): 1963
  - Silver (2): 1981, 1985
  - Bronze (3): 1962, 1979, 1986
- EHF Champions League:
  - Group Stage (4): 1996-1997, 2004-2005, 2005-2006, 2008-2009

== Former club members ==
=== Notable former players ===
- (Lithuania) Gerdas Babarskas (2010–2012)
- (Lithuania) Povilas Babarskas (2006–2010)
- (Lithuania) Tomas Eitutis (1992–1999)
- (Lithuania) Rolandas Bernatonis (2005–2009)
- (Lithuania) Aidenas Malašinskas (2007–2010)
- (Lithuania) Valdas Novickis (2004–2006)
- (Lithuania) Voldemaras Novickis (1982–1988, 1990–1993)
- (Lithuania) Robertas Paužuolis (1995–1997)
- (Lithuania) Vigindas Petkevičius (1989–1991)
- (Lithuania) Andrius Račkauskas (2001–2003)
- (Lithuania) Dalius Rasikevičius (1994–1999)
- (Lithuania) Almantas Savonis (1988–1995)
- (Lithuania) Gintaras Savukynas (1989-1996, 1997–1998)
- (Lithuania) Andrius Stelmokas (1991–1999)
- (Lithuania) Arūnas Vaškevičius (1991–1999)
- (Lithuania) Gintautas Vilaniškis (1990–1996)
- (Austria) (Lithuania) Vytautas Žiūra (1999–2000)

=== Former coaches ===
Seasons	Coach	Country
1981–1993	Antanas Skarbalius	(Lithuania)
1993–2019	Voldemaras Novickis	(Lithuania)
2019–	Vaidotas Grosas	(Lithuania)
