= 2022 IHF Women's U18 Handball World Championship squads =

This article displays the squads for the 2022 IHF Women's U18 Handball World Championship in North Macedonia. Each team consisted of a maximum of 18 players.

Age, club, appearances and goals correct as of 30 July 2022.

== Group A ==
=== Algeria ===
The final squad was announced on 23 July 2022.

Head coach: Nadia Benzine

No.	Pos.	Name	Date of birth (age)	Height	App.	Goals	Club
1	GK	Sara Gaouar	17 June 2004 (aged 18)	1.69 m	6	2	(Algeria) HBC El Biar
2	CB	Alycia Berkani	30 July 2005 (aged 17)	1.72 m	5	10	(Algeria) Mouloudia Mouassasat de Batna
3	LB	Melissa Chebli	26 November 2005 (aged 16)	1.68 m	5	9	(Algeria) HBC Mila
5	LW	Warda Radja	15 September 2005 (aged 16)	1.70 m	2	3	(Algeria) Mouloudia Club de Saïda
6	RW	Sarah Azzi	5 April 2005 (aged 17)	1.70 m	0	0	(Algeria) HBC Mila
7	CB	Ines Aissa	5 August 2004 (aged 17)	1.67 m	5	12	(Algeria) MC Alger
10	CB	Hanane Makdoud	13 September 2004 (aged 17)	1.71 m	2	2	(Algeria) MC Alger
11	LB	Dalila Aini	23 September 2004 (aged 17)	1.73 m	3	6	(Algeria) HBC Mila
12	GK	Oumenia Salah	18 December 2005 (aged 16)	1.70 m	11	2	(Algeria) MC Alger
13	LW	Prescilia Boulhout	12 March 2004 (aged 18)	1.70 m	6	12	(Algeria) Olympique Annaba
16	GK	Zineb Haddad	20 October 2005 (aged 16)	1.75 m	6	2	(Algeria) Nadi Riadhi Kahraba et Ghaz Alger
17	LB	Lina Sadi	4 January 2006 (aged 16)	1.72 m	6	10	(Algeria) HBC El Biar
18	CB	Douae Sahraoui	9 June 2004 (aged 18)	1.76 m	5	10	(Algeria) Chabab Bordj Bou Arréridj
21	LB	Soulef Atmani	31 May 2005 (aged 17)	1.75 m	5	10	(Algeria) HBC El Biar
22	P	Lyna Yelles	22 June 2004 (aged 18)	1.75 m	4	6	(Algeria) MC Alger
28	LB	Fatima Benzait	18 May 2005 (aged 17)	1.79 m	0	0	(Algeria) Jeunesse Sportive de la Saoura
85	CB	Alia Choudani	7 September 2004 (aged 17)	1.68 m	0	0	(France) Tourcoing HB
87	CB	Sarah Hassene	27 January 2005 (aged 17)	1.71 m	0	0	No club

=== Iceland ===
The final squad was announced on 30 July 2022.

Head coach: Ágúst Þór Jóhannsson

No.	Pos.	Name	Date of birth (age)	Height	App.	Goals	Club
2	CB	Elín Klara Þorkelsdóttir	14 September 2004 (aged 17)	1.69 m	13	59	(Iceland) Haukar
3	LB	Alfa Brá Oddsdóttir Hagalín	27 April 2005 (aged 17)	1.77 m	7	9	(Iceland) HK
4	P	Brynja Katrín Benediktsdóttir	14 October 2004 (aged 17)	1.62 m	11	3	(Iceland) Valur
5	RB	Tinna Sigurrós Traustadóttir	5 May 2004 (aged 18)	1.76 m	15	55	(Iceland) Selfoss
6	RW	Katrín Anna Ásmundsdóttir	4 July 2004 (aged 18)	1.70 m	15	32	(Iceland) Grótta
7	RW	Hildur Lilja Jónsdóttir	9 April 2004 (aged 18)	1.77 m	4	2	(Iceland) KA/Þór
8	LB	Inga Dís Jóhannsdóttir	27 March 2004 (aged 18)	1.81 m	15	37	(Iceland) HK
10	P	Thelma Melsted Björgvinsdóttir	5 July 2004 (aged 18)	1.75 m	15	14	(Iceland) Haukar
11	LW	Rakel Oddný Guðmundsdóttir	26 June 2004 (aged 18)	1.68 m	10	4	(Iceland) Haukar
12	GK	Ethel Gyða Bjarnasen	30 July 2005 (aged 17)	1.70 m	2	0	(Iceland) HK
14	P	Elísa Elíasdóttir	31 July 2004 (aged 17)	1.79 m	10	33	(Iceland) ÍBV
16	GK	Ingunn María Brynjarsdóttir	1 June 2006 (aged 16)	1.70 m	11	0	(Iceland) Fram
17	RW	Sara Dröfn Richardsdóttir	27 April 2005 (aged 17)	1.62 m	13	28	(Iceland) ÍBV
18	LW	Lilja Ágústsdóttir	30 April 2004 (aged 18)	1.70 m	15	69	(Iceland) Valur
19	LB	Embla Steindórsdóttir	7 December 2005 (aged 16)	1.72 m	15	14	(Iceland) HK
29	RW	Sonja Lind Sigsteinsdóttir	14 January 2004 (aged 18)	1.63 m	2	1	(Iceland) Stjarnan

=== Montenegro ===
The final squad was announced on 29 July 2022.

Head coach: Maja Savić

No.	Pos.	Name	Date of birth (age)	Height	App.	Goals	Club
3	RW	Tamara Radonjić	25 September 2004 (aged 17)	1.69 m	4	1	(Montenegro) ŽRK Rudar
4	RB	Maja Ceklić	18 May 2007 (aged 15)	1.76 m	5	10	(Montenegro) ŽRK Zeta
5	RW	Nikoleta Radmanović	23 December 2004 (aged 17)	1.75 m	6	6	(Montenegro) ŽRK Rudar
6	LB	Mia Ražnatović	20 August 2004 (aged 17)	1.88 m	8	15	(Montenegro) ŽRK Rudar
7	LW	Ivana Vujadinović	21 November 2004 (aged 17)	1.69 m	7	7	(Montenegro) ŽRK Rudar
8	LW	Lana Pavićević	9 October 2004 (aged 17)	1.70 m	10	10	(Montenegro) ŽRK Rudar
9	RB	Jelena Vukčević	11 December 2004 (aged 17)	1.70 m	15	15	(Montenegro) ŽRK Budućnost
10	CB	Nikolina Marković	26 January 2004 (aged 18)	1.78 m	7	3	(Montenegro) ŽRK Rudar
11	P	Ema Kolić	24 March 2004 (aged 18)	1.76 m	5	2	(Montenegro) ŽRK Rudar
12	GK	Marija Marsenić	6 May 2004 (aged 18)	1.79 m	0	0	(Montenegro) ŽRK Budućnost
13	CB	Nina Ramusović	18 July 2007 (aged 15)	1.75 m	5	10	(Montenegro) ŽRK Nikšić
14	CB	Nađa Micevski	17 April 2004 (aged 18)	1.72 m	8	2	(Montenegro) ŽRK Zeta
15	RB	Katarina Šutović	14 July 2004 (aged 18)	1.76 m	6	4	(Montenegro) ŽRK Levalea 2010
16	GK	Aleksandra Bazović	29 May 2004 (aged 18)	1.87 m	0	0	(Montenegro) ŽRK Rudar
17	LB	Kristina Arsenijević	13 June 2005 (aged 17)	1.87 m	5	2	(Montenegro) ŽRK Tivat
18	LB	Maša Mitrović	5 October 2004 (aged 17)	1.90 m	8	12	(Montenegro) ŽRK Rudar
19	P	Andrea Brajović	21 November 2004 (aged 17)	1.86 m	0	0	(Montenegro) ŽRK Rudar

=== Sweden ===
The final squad was announced on 28 June 2022.

Head coach: Tomas Axnér

No.	Pos.	Name	Date of birth (age)	Height	App.	Goals	Club
1	GK	Line Bergfeldt	7 November 2004 (aged 17)	1.75 m	12	0	(Sweden) IK Sävehof
3	LW	Julia Qvarfordt	21 March 2004 (aged 18)	1.77 m	3	8	(Sweden) IK Sävehof
5	RW	Sol Karlsson	23 April 2004 (aged 18)	1.68 m	8	18	(Sweden) Huddinge HK
6	P	Alice Salmi	21 February 2004 (aged 18)	1.72 m	9	24	(Sweden) Skuru IK
7	LB	Stella Huselius	22 July 2004 (aged 18)	1.72 m	9	27	(Sweden) IK Sävehof
8	LB	Isa Ljungholm	21 March 2004 (aged 18)	1.76 m	0	0	(Sweden) Huddinge HK
9	CB	Emma Mihailovic	10 February 2004 (aged 18)	1.83 m	12	60	(Sweden) IK Sävehof
10	RB	Thea Kylberg	20 June 2004 (aged 18)	1.83 m	8	13	(Sweden) IK Sävehof
11	P	Stina Wiksfors	23 August 2004 (aged 17)	1.82 m	11	13	(Sweden) IK Sävehof
13	CB	Elise Lönnegren	6 November 2004 (aged 17)	1.74 m	12	26	(Sweden) Lugi HF
16	GK	Ida Wall	20 October 2004 (aged 17)	1.80 m	3	0	(Norway) Bækkelagets SK
17	LB	Freja Wahlberg	22 April 2004 (aged 18)	1.74 m	3	3	(Sweden) Skuru IK
20	RB	Tinda Carlsson	16 May 2004 (aged 18)	1.77 m	0	0	(Sweden) IK Sävehof
21	GK	Ella Johansson	19 November 2004 (aged 17)	1.72 m	0	0	(Sweden) VästerasIrsta HF
23	LB	Ebba Schultz	8 June 2005 (aged 17)	1.73 m	0	0	(Sweden) H43 Lund
28	LB	Felicia Granat	9 February 2004 (aged 18)	1.80 m	3	1	(Sweden) IK Sävehof
29	RW	Felicia Norsten Vikström	2 April 2005 (aged 17)	1.67 m	3	5	(Sweden) Huddinge HK

== Group B ==
=== Iran ===
The final squad was announced on 27 July 2022.

Head coach: Gholamali Akbarabadi

No.	Pos.	Name	Date of birth (age)	Height	App.	Goals	Club
1	GK	Hanieh Gharaghozlou	11 July 2004 (aged 18)	1.79 m	0	0	(Iran) Qom
4	CB	Fatemeh Merikhi	6 August 2004 (aged 17)	1.70 m	0	0	No club
10	P	Shaghayegh Cheraghi	7 April 2004 (aged 18)	1.77 m	0	0	No club
12	GK	Elnaz Yarmohammadtouski	4 May 2005 (aged 17)	1.70 m	0	0	No club
14	RW	Arezoo Bahmaei	28 December 2004 (aged 17)	1.59 m	0	0	No club
17	P	Saba Zanganeh	24 January 2004 (aged 18)	1.70 m	0	0	No club
21	LB	Fatemeh Ahmadi	10 May 2004 (aged 18)	1.71 m	0	0	No club
24	CB	Aseman Badvi	24 February 2007 (aged 15)	1.75 m	0	0	No club
29	CB	Shahrzad Nosoohi	18 May 2004 (aged 18)	1.72 m	0	0	(Iran) Sepahan
39	LW	Negin Rahmani	8 December 2005 (aged 16)	1.68 m	0	0	No club
44	LB	Hanieh Shahveisi	30 August 2005 (aged 16)	1.70 m	0	0	No club
49	RW	Saeideh Ghazanfari	13 November 2004 (aged 17)	1.69 m	0	0	(Iran) Sepahan
72	LW	Zahra Fotovati	6 April 2004 (aged 18)	1.72 m	0	0	(Iran) Qom
76	LB	Nastaran Koudzarifarahani	10 January 2004 (aged 18)	1.75 m	0	0	(Iran) Qom
77	RW	Hasti Dokhaei	13 May 2004 (aged 18)	1.63 m	0	0	No club
87	GK	Tina Kihani	15 February 2005 (aged 17)	1.82 m	0	0	No club
88	LW	Maede Oshaghi	17 June 2004 (aged 18)	1.77 m	0	0	(Iran) Tasisat Daryaei

=== North Macedonia ===
The final squad was announced on 25 July 2022.

Head coach: Ljubomir Savevski

No.	Pos.	Name	Date of birth (age)	Height	App.	Goals	Club
1	GK	Matea Churlinovska	6 December 2005 (aged 16)	1.75 m	0	0	(North Macedonia) ŽRK Despina
5	P	Iva Velkova	5 February 2006 (aged 16)	1.82 m	0	0	(North Macedonia) ŽRK Gjorche Petrov
8	LB	Tijana Pereska	3 April 2004 (aged 18)	1.65 m	0	0	(North Macedonia) ŽRK Stružanka
9	CB	Nena Nestoroska	18 May 2005 (aged 17)	1.71 m	0	0	(North Macedonia) ŽRK Metalurg
11	LB	Sara Stefanoska	11 January 2005 (aged 17)	1.73 m	0	0	(North Macedonia) ŽRK Vardar
12	GK	Dona Markoska	17 June 2007 (aged 15)	1.72 m	0	0	(North Macedonia) RK Sani 14
13	P	Aleksandra Kolovska	23 February 2004 (aged 18)	1.73 m	0	0	(North Macedonia) ŽRK Metalurg
15	CB	Marija Jankulovska	2 November 2005 (aged 16)	1.75 m	0	0	(North Macedonia) ŽRK Pelister 2012
16	GK	Marija Jovanovska	30 August 2004 (aged 17)	1.80 m	0	0	(North Macedonia) ŽRK Kumanovo
17	RB	Teodora Dukoska	10 June 2004 (aged 18)	1.72 m	0	0	(North Macedonia) ŽRK Chair
24	RB	Borjana Koceva	29 June 2004 (aged 18)	1.72 m	0	0	(North Macedonia) ŽRK Vardar
25	P	Mila Peshikj	18 May 2004 (aged 18)	1.78 m	0	0	(Germany) TV Verl
29	LW	Jana Ravojska	19 October 2004 (aged 17)	1.75 m	0	0	(North Macedonia) ŽRK Vardar
31	LB	Sara Bogojeska	15 June 2005 (aged 17)	1.80 m	0	0	(North Macedonia) ŽRK Kumanovo
43	LW	Emilijana Rizoska	21 May 2005 (aged 17)	1.65 m	0	0	(North Macedonia) RK Feniks AMS
53	LW	Menduvie Daliposka	16 February 2005 (aged 17)	1.64 m	0	0	(North Macedonia) ŽRK Stružanka
90	CB	Bojana Koceva	29 June 2004 (aged 18)	1.69 m	0	0	(North Macedonia) ŽRK Vardar
91	RB	Iva Mladenovska	14 January 2007 (aged 15)	1.80 m	0	0	(North Macedonia) ŽRK Metalurg

=== Senegal ===
The final squad was announced on 28 July 2022.

Head coach: Serigne Fall

No.	Pos.	Name	Date of birth (age)	Height	App.	Goals	Club
2	LB	Mamboup Guèye	10 November 2005 (aged 16)	1.70 m	0	0	(Senegal) Sacré-Cœur
3	LB	Sokhna Sai Dione	15 November 2004 (aged 17)	1.66 m	0	0	(Senegal) Diamono
5	RW	Amy Sarr	13 March 2004 (aged 18)	1.67 m	0	0	(Senegal) Toubacouta
6	LB	Sira Kébé	6 September 2004 (aged 17)	1.76 m	0	0	(France) Le Havre
7	RW	Oumou Dione	6 June 2005 (aged 17)	1.70 m	0	0	(Senegal) Madjiguène
8	P	Ndèye Rokhaya Dio Ndiaye	28 December 2006 (aged 15)	1.80 m	0	0	(Senegal) Centre national d’Entraînement de Hand-Ball
10	CB	Ndèye Maguette Diop	26 March 2004 (aged 18)	1.66 m	0	0	(Senegal) Centre national d’Entraînement de Hand-Ball
11	RB	Salimata Fall	12 December 2004 (aged 17)	1.77 m	0	0	(Senegal) Centre national d’Entraînement de Hand-Ball
12	GK	Amy Ndiaye	20 May 2004 (aged 18)	1.76 m	0	0	(Senegal) Centre national d’Entraînement de Hand-Ball
13	RB	Theresiria Gomis	22 October 2004 (aged 17)	1.70 m	0	0	(Senegal) Centre national d’Entraînement de Hand-Ball
15	CB	Oumy Guèye	10 March 2004 (aged 18)	1.66 m	0	0	(Senegal) US Rail
16	GK	Nguénar Cissé	15 March 2004 (aged 18)	1.75 m	0	0	(Senegal) Centre national d’Entraînement de Hand-Ball
17	LB	Astou Mbène Mbaye	13 April 2004 (aged 18)	1.77 m	0	0	(Senegal) Centre national d’Entraînement de Hand-Ball
23	LW	Amy Mbengue	17 January 2004 (aged 18)	1.72 m	0	0	(Senegal) Centre national d’Entraînement de Hand-Ball
29	P	Mbarka Mboup	29 August 2005 (aged 16)	1.72 m	0	0	(France) Le Havre
44	P	Fatoumata Diagana	8 April 2004 (aged 18)	1.70 m	0	0	(Senegal) Diamono

=== Uzbekistan ===
The final squad was announced on 30 July 2022.

Head coach: Ismoiljon Ahmedov

No.	Pos.	Name	Date of birth (age)	Height	App.	Goals	Club
1	GK	Dinora Gafforova	28 March 2005 (aged 17)	1.60 m	1	10	(Uzbekistan) AGMK
2	P	Gulasal Iminjonova	10 February 2004 (aged 18)	1.60 m	1	9	(Uzbekistan) AGMK
3	LB	Shakhlo Abyllaeva	13 December 2004 (aged 17)	1.70 m	1	8	(Uzbekistan) AGMK
4	RB	Zulaykho Marimboeva	2 September 2004 (aged 17)	1.60 m	3	40	(Uzbekistan) AGMK
5	P	Bonu Erkaboeva	13 May 2004 (aged 18)	1.71 m	2	20	(Uzbekistan) AGMK
7	RB	Sarbinaz Saparbaeva	23 December 2006 (aged 15)	1.62 m	2	14	(Uzbekistan) AGMK
8	P	Lobar Shamieva	18 April 2004 (aged 18)	1.72 m	1	10	(Uzbekistan) AGMK
9	LB	Rukhshona Ruzieva	9 April 2005 (aged 17)	1.73 m	1	15	(Uzbekistan) AGMK
10	LB	Sevinch Erkabaeva	23 September 2004 (aged 17)	1.72 m	2	25	(Uzbekistan) AGMK
11	LB	Arofatkhon Kimsanboeva	20 January 2005 (aged 17)	1.70 m	1	18	(Uzbekistan) AGMK
12	CB	Sevda Lennurova	14 October 2005 (aged 16)	1.65 m	1	7	(Uzbekistan) AGMK
14	CB	Sabina Mullaeva	8 January 2005 (aged 17)	1.57 m	1	8	(Uzbekistan) AGMK
15	LW	Zilola Murodova	19 March 2005 (aged 17)	1.64 m	1	9	(Uzbekistan) AGMK
16	GK	Marjona Ibragimova	19 November 2004 (aged 17)	1.71 m	1	6	(Uzbekistan) AGMK
17	P	Komila Abadlaeva	8 February 2004 (aged 18)	1.65 m	0	0	(Uzbekistan) AGMK
18	LW	Gulzada Turganbaeva	9 February 2006 (aged 16)	1.64 m	0	0	(Uzbekistan) AGMK

== Group C ==
=== Austria ===
The final squad was announced on 28 July 2022.

Head coach: Simona Spiridon

No.	Pos.	Name	Date of birth (age)	Height	App.	Goals	Club
1	GK	Valentina Hernach	28 February 2005 (aged 17)	1.73 m	13	0	(Austria) UHC Tulln
3	RB	Alina Dotzler	2 September 2004 (aged 17)	1.68 m	15	32	(Austria) HIB Handball Graz
5	LB	Laura Götze	17 March 2005 (aged 17)	1.79 m	15	24	(Austria) SSV Dornbirn Schoren
6	CB	Anna Lauter	31 December 2004 (aged 17)	1.67 m	13	8	(Austria) WAT Atzgersdorf
7	RW	Lisa Purkarthofer	16 December 2004 (aged 17)	1.76 m	1	1	(Austria) Vöslauer HC
8	RW	Philomena Egger	1 May 2007 (aged 15)	1.75 m	0	0	(Austria) Hypo Niederösterreich
9	CB	Cara Spitzer	27 May 2004 (aged 18)	1.64 m	2	1	(Austria) UHC Graz
12	GK	Sara Jancic	21 March 2005 (aged 17)	1.70 m	0	0	(Austria) UHC Admira Wien
14	RB	Lorena Baljak	24 October 2006 (aged 15)	1.68 m	0	0	(Austria) Alpla HC Hard
15	CB	Marie Prokop	17 June 2004 (aged 18)	1.70 m	15	51	(Austria) roomz JAGS Wr. Neustadt
16	GK	Nina Tilliacher	21 February 2005 (aged 17)	1.73 m	15	0	(Austria) SSV Dornbirn Schoren
17	CB	Anna Moritz	12 November 2004 (aged 17)	1.60 m	0	0	(Austria) HIB Handball Graz
18	CB	Viktoria Marksteiner	5 November 2005 (aged 16)	1.70 m	7	6	(Austria) SSV Dornbirn Schoren
20	CB	Emilia Brändle	24 August 2006 (aged 15)	1.70 m	0	0	(Austria) SSV Dornbirn Schoren
23	LB	Ines Mustedanagic	10 August 2004 (aged 17)	1.75 m	13	7	(Austria) WAT Atzgersdorf
24	P	Lina Kovacs	8 October 2004 (aged 17)	1.75 m	0	0	(Austria) roomz JAGS Wr. Neustadt

=== Denmark ===
The final squad was announced on 30 July 2022.

Head coach: Flemming Dam Larsen

No.	Pos.	Name	Date of birth (age)	Height	App.	Goals	Club
2	LW	Sara Ibranovic	11 June 2004 (aged 18)	1.75 m	11	20	(Denmark) Ajax København
4	LB	Julie Scaglione	20 August 2004 (aged 17)	1.75 m	11	80	(Denmark) Ikast Håndbold
5	RB	Anna Bang	22 February 2004 (aged 18)	1.71 m	0	0	(Denmark) GOG Håndbold
6	P	Boline Laursen	13 September 2005 (aged 16)	1.80 m	1	0	(Denmark) Skanderborg Håndbold
7	LW	Matilde Vestergaard	11 September 2004 (aged 17)	1.64 m	11	26	(Denmark) HH Elite
8	CB	Ida Nielsen	30 March 2004 (aged 18)	1.69 m	11	13	(Denmark) Roskilde Håndbold
9	LB	Laura Thestrup	21 February 2004 (aged 18)	1.87 m	11	31	(Denmark) Skanderborg Håndbold
10	P	Filippa Larsen	3 February 2004 (aged 18)	1.80 m	11	8	(Denmark) Skanderborg Håndbold
12	GK	Ida Kaysen	12 April 2004 (aged 18)	1.85 m	8	0	(Denmark) GOG Håndbold
14	LB	Alberte Hovgaard-Hansen	10 December 2004 (aged 17)	1.70 m	0	0	(Denmark) Aarhus United
15	CB	Annika Dalsager	29 August 2004 (aged 17)	1.71 m	2	4	(Denmark) GOG Håndbold
17	P	Julia Holtorf	6 March 2004 (aged 18)	1.72 m	11	13
19	RW	Laura Hansen	4 July 2004 (aged 18)	1.66 m	2	1	(Denmark) SønderjyskE Damehåndbold
20	GK	Signe Rasmussen	24 November 2005 (aged 16)	1.83 m	11	0	(Denmark) VGIE
21	RB	Anne Johansen	22 April 2004 (aged 18)	1.73 m	11	24	(Denmark) Ajax København
26	RW	Nicoline Vendelborg	14 August 2004 (aged 17)	1.70 m	2	4	(Denmark) TMS Ringsted

=== Faroe Islands ===
The final squad was announced on 30 July 2022.

Head coach: Simon Olsen

No.	Pos.	Name	Date of birth (age)	Height	App.	Goals	Club
1	GK	Silja Arngrímsdóttir Müller	2 February 2004 (aged 18)	1.68 m	6	0	(Faroe Islands) Neistin
2	RW	Karin Egholm	28 July 2005 (aged 17)	1.65 m	6	20	(Faroe Islands) H71
4	RW	Inga Roysdóttir	28 October 2005 (aged 16)	1.65 m	6	10	(Faroe Islands) H71
5	LB	Silja Heðinsdóttir	18 July 2004 (aged 18)	1.69 m	0	0	(Faroe Islands) Neistin
7	CB	Maria Pálsdóttir Nólsoy	19 August 2004 (aged 17)	1.70 m	12	40	(Faroe Islands) Neistin
8	RB	Bjørk Franksdóttir Joensen	2 November 2004 (aged 17)	1.65 m	12	20	(Faroe Islands) Neistin
9	P	Sára Sigrunardóttir Mikkelsen	27 April 2004 (aged 18)	1.70 m	12	20	(Faroe Islands) Neistin
10	LW	Lea Mohr	11 December 2004 (aged 17)	1.67 m	6	12	(Faroe Islands) Neistin
11	CB	Lukka Arge	28 June 2004 (aged 18)	1.70 m	6	30	(Faroe Islands) H71
12	GK	Simona Michelsen Kass	30 August 2004 (aged 17)	1.65 m	6	0	(Faroe Islands) H71
13	RB	Inga Joensen	13 September 2004 (aged 17)	1.66 m	0	0	(Faroe Islands) H71
14	LB	Anna Sigrunardóttir Mikkelsen	27 April 2004 (aged 18)	1.70 m	6	10	(Faroe Islands) Neistin
18	CB	Anna Halsdóttir Weyhe	30 October 2005 (aged 16)	1.65 m	6	15	(Faroe Islands) H71
19	P	Barbara Hammer	20 December 2004 (aged 17)	1.70 m	6	6	(Faroe Islands) Kyndil
33	LB	Hanna Jakobsdóttir Dalsgarð	2 August 2004 (aged 17)	1.70 m	0	0	(Faroe Islands) H71
99	P	Karina Heinesen	17 October 2005 (aged 16)	1.67 m	6	6	(Faroe Islands) H71

=== Portugal ===
The final squad was announced on 21 July 2022.

Head coach: Luís Santos

No.	Pos.	Name	Date of birth (age)	Height	App.	Goals	Club
1	GK	Maria Costa	5 November 2004 (aged 17)	1.78 m	0	0	(Portugal) ABC/UMinho
2	LW	Maria Pico	10 May 2004 (aged 18)	1.64 m	11	20	(Portugal) CD Gil Eanes
3	LW	Luana Jesus	22 February 2004 (aged 18)	1.63 m	12	26	(Portugal) Madeira SAD
5	P	Sofia Ferreira	2 September 2005 (aged 16)	1.65 m	9	18	(Portugal) Madeira SAD
8	CB	Constança Sequeira	17 February 2004 (aged 18)	1.63 m	24	140	(Portugal) AC Alavarium
10	LB	Carmen Figueiredo	3 January 2005 (aged 17)	1.77 m	19	62	(Portugal) CD Gil Eanes
11	P	Leonor Antunes	20 October 2005 (aged 16)	1.80 m	5	1	(Portugal) CJ Almeida Garrett
12	GK	Matilde Rosa	8 July 2005 (aged 17)	1.74 m	29	1	(Portugal) CD Gil Eanes
13	RW	Júlia Figueira	12 June 2005 (aged 17)	1.64 m	11	10	(Portugal) Madeira SAD
14	RB	Denise Fernandes	31 December 2004 (aged 17)	1.78 m	9	12	(Portugal) SL Benfica
15	RB	Luciana Rebelo	25 July 2005 (aged 17)	1.87 m	14	57	(Portugal) Maiastars
16	GK	Rita Guimarães	29 June 2005 (aged 17)	1.68 m	11	0	(Portugal) ARC Alpendorada
17	RB	Joana Semedo	4 February 2005 (aged 17)	1.78 m	12	14	(Portugal) CS Madeira
19	P	Matilde Correia	29 June 2005 (aged 17)	1.78 m	12	28	(Portugal) CD Gil Eanes
21	CB	Mariana Silva	21 February 2005 (aged 17)	1.73 m	13	19	(Portugal) Maiastars
22	LB	Naíde Gonçalves	22 February 2005 (aged 17)	1.70 m	13	34	(Portugal) ABC/UMinho

== Group D ==
=== Croatia ===
The final squad was announced on 22 July 2022.

Head coach: Nenad Smiljanec

No.	Pos.	Name	Date of birth (age)	Height	App.	Goals	Club
1	GK	Ema Novosel	18 November 2004 (aged 17)	1.80 m	9	0	(Croatia) RK Lokomotiva Zagreb
2	LW	Katja Marić	10 July 2005 (aged 17)	1.80 m	4	5	(Croatia) RK Trešnjevka
4	LW	Lara Perić	19 November 2004 (aged 17)	1.62 m	13	21	(Croatia) ŽRK Koka
5	CB	Iva Zrilić	13 October 2004 (aged 17)	1.66 m	13	13	(Croatia) RK Lokomotiva Zagreb
7	P	Ema Balaško	12 December 2004 (aged 17)	1.75 m	15	16	(Croatia) ŽRK Zrinski
8	RW	Kala Kosovac	29 May 2005 (aged 17)	1.68 m	13	19	(Croatia) RK Lokomotiva Zagreb
9	CB	Nika Gavrilović	12 December 2004 (aged 17)	1.65 m	13	12	(Croatia) RK Sesvete Agroproteinka
10	CB	Iva Bule	14 November 2004 (aged 17)	1.74 m	15	55	(Croatia) RK Dalmatinka
11	RB	Sara Marendić	18 May 2004 (aged 18)	1.75 m	13	41	(Croatia) ŽRK Split 2010
14	LB	Anja Balent	20 May 2004 (aged 18)	1.76 m	4	2	(Croatia) ŽRK Zrinski
16	GK	Mia Mraković	14 February 2005 (aged 17)	1.75 m	0	0	(Croatia) ŽRK Zamet
17	LW	Tina Wurth	9 November 2004 (aged 17)	1.67 m	6	3	(Croatia) RK Lokomotiva Zagreb
21	RW	Monika Sikaček	6 October 2005 (aged 16)	1.69 m	0	0	(Croatia) ŽRK Ivanić
22	GK	Lea Zetović	10 October 2004 (aged 17)	1.81 m	14	0	(Croatia) RK Sesvete Agroproteinka
23	RB	Anđela Žagar	22 July 2004 (aged 18)	1.94 m	15	32	(France) Metz Handball
25	RW	Lana Strugar	27 November 2004 (aged 17)	1.67 m	4	4	(Croatia) RK Podravka Vegeta
33	P	Maja Grgošević	9 January 2005 (aged 17)	1.67 m	2	5	(Croatia) ŽRK Dugo Selo '55
34	LB	Magali Lujić	22 May 2004 (aged 18)	1.70 m	2	0	(Croatia) RK Sesvete Agroproteinka

=== Egypt ===
The final squad was announced on 30 July 2022.

Head coach: Mohamed Ahmed Farghaly

No.	Pos.	Name	Date of birth (age)	Height	App.	Goals	Club
1	GK	Lubna Ashraf	4 January 2004 (aged 18)	1.74 m	4	0	(Egypt) El Shams
5	RW	Nancy El-Hamy	11 March 2004 (aged 18)	1.66 m	0	0	(Egypt) Al Maadi
6	LB	Jude Ahmed	17 October 2004 (aged 17)	1.69 m	2	27	(Egypt) Alexandria
8	LW	Mariam Omar	15 January 2004 (aged 18)	1.69 m	16	50	(Egypt) Zamalek
11	LB	Lojin Osama	17 February 2004 (aged 18)	1.85 m	10	30	(Egypt) Smouha
13	LW	Mentallah Adel	14 May 2005 (aged 17)	1.71 m	5	33	(Egypt) 6th of October
14	RW	Kenzy Hatem	22 March 2004 (aged 18)	1.70 m	10	30	(Egypt) Smouha
25	CB	Malak Ahmed	1 February 2004 (aged 18)	1.72 m	5	18	(Egypt) Al Ahly
28	CB	Nadein Tarek	18 December 2004 (aged 17)	1.70 m	5	24	(Egypt) Alexandria
33	GK	Yathreb Walib	11 August 2005 (aged 16)	1.89 m	0	0	(Egypt) Al Ahly
44	LB	Touka Kamel	2 December 2004 (aged 17)	1.77 m	5	17	(Egypt) 6th of October
55	RB	Nawal Ahmed	12 February 2005 (aged 17)	1.77 m	5	20	(Egypt) Alexandria
89	P	Fatma Mahmoud	17 July 2005 (aged 17)	1.71 m	5	8	(Egypt) El Shams
91	CB	Shrouk Mahmoud	7 July 2006 (aged 16)	1.74 m	5	3	(Egypt) Al Ahly
98	GK	Gihad Wael	21 February 2006 (aged 16)	1.78 m	5	0	(Egypt) Al Ahly
99	RB	Jana Salaheldin	7 March 2004 (aged 18)	1.67 m	11	20	(Egypt) Alexandria

=== India ===
The final squad was announced on 30 July 2022.

Head coach: Arvind Kumar Yadav

No.	Pos.	Name	Date of birth (age)	Height	App.	Goals	Club
1	GK	Chetna Devi	24 February 2004 (aged 18)	1.70 m	3	2	No club
2	LW	Aarti	9 November 2005 (aged 16)	1.64 m	1	4	No club
3	RB	Pooja	12 August 2005 (aged 16)	1.73 m	4	9	No club
4	LB	Jassi	2 January 2005 (aged 17)	1.67 m	4	10	No club
5	RW	Payal	15 February 2005 (aged 17)	1.61 m	3	6	No club
7	P	Teena	12 January 2006 (aged 16)	1.59 m	2	6	No club
8	CB	Sanjana Kumari	15 December 2004 (aged 17)	1.63 m	4	7	No club
10	LB	Priya	2 January 2005 (aged 17)	1.67 m	0	6	No club
11	LW	Preeti	1 August 2005 (aged 16)	1.61 m	2	12	No club
12	GK	Nanita	25 June 2004 (aged 18)	1.62 m	3	1	No club
13	RB	Garima	21 June 2004 (aged 18)	1.60 m	3	7	No club
15	LW	Kritika Thakur	14 June 2005 (aged 17)	1.65 m	3	7	No club
16	GK	Pooja Gurjar	3 May 2005 (aged 17)	1.57 m	0	0	No club
17	RW	Kareena Madavi	6 June 2006 (aged 16)	1.59 m	1	2	No club
18	P	Dayaben Kanjibhai Zapadiya	2 January 2006 (aged 16)	1.60 m	0	0	No club
20	CB	Gulshan Sharma	14 April 2004 (aged 18)	1.67 m	2	7	No club
21	RB	Esha Majumdar	3 January 2004 (aged 18)	1.65 m	2	6	No club
22	LB	Anushka Ankush Chavan	29 October 2005 (aged 16)	1.64 m	1	3	No club

=== Kazakhstan ===
The final squad was announced on 30 July 2022.

Head coach: Valentina Degtyareva

No.	Pos.	Name	Date of birth (age)	Height	App.	Goals	Club
1	GK	Damira Zhaparova	27 November 2005 (aged 16)	1.70 m	5	0	(Kazakhstan) Astana
4	P	Mariya Golovleva	21 June 2005 (aged 17)	1.73 m	5	7	(Kazakhstan) Kazygurt
8	LB	Lyubov Kovalyova	15 January 2006 (aged 16)	1.80 m	0	0	(Kazakhstan) Kaysar
10	P	Alsina Zhumabek	15 January 2005 (aged 17)	1.70 m	12	7	(Kazakhstan) Kaysar
18	P	Madina Myrzamseiitova	4 February 2005 (aged 17)	1.78 m	0	0	(Kazakhstan) Astana
26	GK	Kamilla Nadirova	21 March 2005 (aged 17)	1.78 m	12	0	(Kazakhstan) Kazygurt
35	P	Kira Nemtyreva	7 January 2005 (aged 17)	1.80 m	12	4	(Kazakhstan) Dostyk
44	GK	Darya Kolesnichenko	8 August 2004 (aged 17)	1.78 m	12	0	(Kazakhstan) Kazygurt
74	LW	Zhannur Assylbek	17 July 2004 (aged 18)	1.58 m	5	5	(Kazakhstan) Dostyk
77	LB	Anna Ivanova	21 March 2004 (aged 18)	1.75 m	12	17	(Kazakhstan) Kazygurt
86	LW	Ulzhan Kametay	4 November 2005 (aged 16)	1.60 m	5	6	(Kazakhstan) Astana
87	LB	Yelena Berenda	3 June 2004 (aged 18)	1.75 m	7	23	(Kazakhstan) Dostyk
93	RB	Zhanerke Kuandykova	25 February 2004 (aged 18)	1.72 m	0	0	(Kazakhstan) Astana
97	LW	Milana Ulyanchenko	10 September 2004 (aged 17)	1.58 m	5	10	(Kazakhstan) Kazygurt

== Group E ==
=== Guinea ===
The final squad was announced on 29 July 2022.

Head coach: Lansana Camara

No.	Pos.	Name	Date of birth (age)	Height	App.	Goals	Club
1	GK	Mabinty Bangoura	16 November 2004 (aged 17)		0	0
2	CB	Mariama Bangoura	25 October 2005 (aged 16)	1.61 m	0	0
3	P	Diaraye Soumah	10 August 2006 (aged 15)		0	0	(Guinea) Diables Rouges
4	GK	Hawa Sylla	12 December 2007 (aged 14)		0	0	(Guinea) Alu Star de FriA
6	CB	Mariétou Camara	26 October 2004 (aged 17)		0	0	(Guinea) Aiglon
7	LB	Kadiatou Bangoura	22 November 2006 (aged 15)	1.65 m	0	0
8	CB	Kadiatou Sankhon	18 March 2005 (aged 17)		0	0	(Guinea) Alu Star de FriA
9	LB	Kadiatou Kaba	8 April 2004 (aged 18)		0	0	(Guinea) Alu Star de FriA
10	CB	Aicha Bangoura	1 November 2006 (aged 15)		0	0
11	CB	Aicha Bangoura	5 November 2006 (aged 15)		0	0
12	RW	Fatoumata Yansane	11 August 2005 (aged 16)		0	0	(Guinea) Alu Star de FriA
14	LB	M'mah Kouroma	26 October 2004 (aged 17)		0	0	(Guinea) Aiglon
15	P	Mayelie Soumah	12 June 2004 (aged 18)		0	0	(Guinea) Aiglon
16	CB	Tady Camara	1 January 2005 (aged 17)		0	0	(Guinea) Alu Star de FriA
18	RW	Aminata Soumah	18 March 2004 (aged 18)		0	0	(Guinea) Alu Star de FriA
19	RB	Maciré Camara	6 February 2006 (aged 16)		0	0	(Guinea) Diables Rouges
22	CB	Fatoumata Soumah	11 November 2006 (aged 15)		0	0	(Guinea) Alu Star de FriA
23	LB	Aicha Fall	17 March 2006 (aged 16)		0	0	(Guinea) Kaloum

=== Netherlands ===
The final squad was announced on 22 July 2022.

Head coach: Ricardo Clarijs

No.	Pos.	Name	Date of birth (age)	Height	App.	Goals	Club
1	GK	Nikki van der Vorst	20 June 2006 (aged 16)	1.79 m	8	5	(Netherlands) VOC Amsterdam
2	GK	Bianca Schanssema	6 January 2005 (aged 17)	1.90 m	19	0	(Netherlands) RKHV Quintus
5	LB	Judith van der Helm	13 January 2005 (aged 17)	1.65 m	16	23	(Netherlands) RKHV Quintus
7	P	Roos Knijn	10 March 2004 (aged 18)	1.76 m	9	15	(Netherlands) Westfriesland SEW
8	LW	Veerle Steijns	30 October 2004 (aged 17)	1.65 m	9	17	(Netherlands) Geonius/V&L
9	RB	Donna Bakker	6 February 2004 (aged 18)	1.66 m	9	19	(Netherlands) VOC Amsterdam
10	CB	Romy Stadens	21 May 2005 (aged 17)	1.70 m	0	0	(Netherlands) E&O
11	CB	Daphne Luchies	23 May 2004 (aged 18)	1.65 m	4	3	(Netherlands) PCA Kwiek
12	LW	Loïs van Vliet	15 August 2005 (aged 16)	1.76 m	20	53	(Netherlands) VOC Amsterdam
14	RB	Alieke van Maurik	11 May 2005 (aged 17)	1.81 m	9	36	(Netherlands) RKHV Quintus
15	LB	Lynn Holtman	7 July 2004 (aged 18)	1.65 m	10	21	(Netherlands) PCA Kwiek
16	LB	Nomi In de Braekt	15 August 2004 (aged 17)	1.79 m	12	12	(Netherlands) Geonius/V&L
20	LB	Jalisha Loy	6 February 2004 (aged 18)	1.65 m	31	83	(Netherlands) VOC Amsterdam
21	P	Romée Maarschalkerweerd	24 September 2004 (aged 17)	1.78 m	8	27	(Netherlands) VOC Amsterdam
23	LB	Rozemarijn Alderden	30 March 2004 (aged 18)	1.84 m	8	9	(Netherlands) VOC Amsterdam
27	CB	Minke van Katwijk	1 November 2004 (aged 17)	1.76 m	0	0	(Netherlands) Cabooter Group/Handbal Venlo

=== Romania ===
The final squad was announced on 30 July 2022.

Head coach: Aurelian Roșca

No.	Pos.	Name	Date of birth (age)	Height	App.	Goals	Club
1	GK	Teodora Neagu	15 October 2004 (aged 17)	1.70 m	30	2	(Romania) CSS 2 Baia Mare
2	RB	Mihaela Mihai	15 December 2004 (aged 17)	1.79 m	30	60	(Romania) CSM București
4	LW	Vanessa Predescu	5 February 2004 (aged 18)	1.63 m	30	50	(Romania) GS Energetic
5	CB	Anamaria Grigore	29 March 2004 (aged 18)	1.77 m	30	80	(Romania) CSM Corona Brașov
6	CB	Teodora Damian	9 December 2006 (aged 15)	1.76 m	0	0	(Romania) AHC Potaissa Turda
8	P	Maria Mezei	1 December 2004 (aged 17)	1.74 m	30	40	(Romania) GS Energetic
9	LB	Irina Maxim	28 November 2005 (aged 16)	1.81 m	20	30	(Romania) CSM București
12	GK	Maria Demeter	1 October 2004 (aged 17)	1.81 m	5	0	(Romania) CSM Corona Brașov
16	GK	Ioana Niţă	4 May 2006 (aged 16)	1.83 m	0	0	(Romania) CSM București
17	RB	Valentina Lecu	14 September 2004 (aged 17)	1.70 m	0	0	(Romania) CSM Slatina
18	LB	Diana Lixăndroiu	14 August 2005 (aged 16)	1.84 m	30	100	(Romania) GS Energetic
23	RW	Orsolya Mozes	9 July 2004 (aged 18)	1.70 m	20	30	(Romania) AHC Potaissa Turda
24	CB	Alisia Boiciuc	20 July 2005 (aged 17)	1.76 m	35	200	(Romania) CSS 2 Baia Mare
29	LB	Denisa Pavel	26 March 2004 (aged 18)	1.79 m	10	15	(Romania) CSM Corona Brașov
44	LB	Maria Groșan	19 April 2004 (aged 18)	1.80 m	15	15	(Romania) CSS 2 Baia Mare
55	P	Cristina Danciu	30 July 2004 (aged 18)	1.73 m	10	15	(Romania) CSS 2 Baia Mare
77	LW	Mariam Mohamed	27 August 2004 (aged 17)	1.73 m	20	25	(Romania) CSM București

=== Slovenia ===
The final squad was announced on 29 July 2022.

Head coach: Borut Hren

No.	Pos.	Name	Date of birth (age)	Height	App.	Goals	Club
1	GK	Saša Posega	25 July 2004 (aged 18)	1.73 m	13	1	(Slovenia) ŽRD Litija
5	RB	Urša Matekovič	2 November 2004 (aged 17)	1.83 m	9	13	(Slovenia) ŽRK Izola
6	P	Lara Bukovec	13 December 2005 (aged 16)	1.73 m	9	15	(Slovenia) ŽRK Z'dežele
7	CB	Azra Zulić	24 March 2005 (aged 17)	1.77 m	18	66	(Slovenia) ŽRK Z'dežele
9	CB	Nika Ocepek	5 August 2004 (aged 17)	1.72 m	17	40	(Slovenia) RK Krim
10	LB	Stina Jazbinšek	1 July 2005 (aged 17)	1.75 m	10	13	(Slovenia) RK Zelene Doline Žalec
11	LW	Tinkara Kogovšek	21 November 2004 (aged 17)	1.70 m	4	0	(Slovenia) ŽRD Litija
12	GK	Dijana Đajić	3 October 2004 (aged 17)	1.82 m	5	0	(Slovenia) RK Olimpija
13	LB	Tea Pogorelc	13 January 2006 (aged 16)	1.80 m	0	0	(Slovenia) RK Krim
15	RW	Deja Udovč	13 February 2004 (aged 18)	1.69 m	11	22	(Slovenia) ŽRK Krka
16	GK	Zala Vuk	3 December 2005 (aged 16)	1.75 m	8	0	(Slovenia) ŽRK Ajdovščina
17	RW	Elena Erceg	7 June 2006 (aged 16)	1.69 m	0	0	(Slovenia) RK Krim
18	LW	Nena Černigoj	6 August 2004 (aged 17)	1.70 m	0	0	(Slovenia) ŽRK Ajdovščina
20	P	Ina Simič	16 December 2004 (aged 17)	1.72 m	9	13	(Slovenia) RK Krim
22	LW	Naja Kokalj	20 February 2005 (aged 17)	1.68 m	0	0	(Slovenia) RK Krim
24	CB	Klara Zel	29 January 2005 (aged 17)	1.74 m	0	0	(Slovenia) ŽRK Branik

== Group F ==
=== Germany ===
The final squad was announced on 27 July 2022.

Head coach: Gino Smits

No.	Pos.	Name	Date of birth (age)	Height	App.	Goals	Club
1	GK	Sarah Hübner	28 September 2004 (aged 17)	1.73 m	15	0	(Germany) Füchse Berlin
3	RB	Maja Schönefeld	12 March 2004 (aged 18)	1.80 m	15	5	(Germany) Buxtehuder SV
5	RW	Pia Terfloth	26 April 2004 (aged 18)	1.75 m	11	18	(Germany) TSV Bayer 04 Leverkusen
7	LW	Magdalena Probst	24 January 2004 (aged 18)	1.61 m	12	10	(Germany) VfL Waiblingen
8	P	Merja Wohlfeil	24 February 2005 (aged 17)	1.76 m	15	9	(Germany) Buxtehuder SV
9	LB	Nieke Kühne	9 September 2004 (aged 17)	1.84 m	14	99	(Germany) HSG Blomberg-Lippe
10	LB	Matilda Ehlert	16 December 2004 (aged 17)	1.81 m	15	34	(Germany) VfL Waiblingen
11	RW	Gianina Bianco	21 September 2004 (aged 17)	1.69 m	15	26	(Germany) TSG Ketsch 1902
12	GK	Marie Weiss	14 September 2004 (aged 17)	1.80 m	15	1	(Germany) TuS Metzingen
14	CB	Lotta Röpcke	23 January 2004 (aged 18)	1.75 m	12	28	(Germany) HC Leipzig
15	LW	Emy Hürkamp	2 April 2004 (aged 18)	1.62 m	2	1	(Germany) Frankfurter HC
18	P	Merle Albers	19 April 2004 (aged 18)	1.83 m	12	13	(France) Metz Handball
19	RB	Viola Leuchter	15 June 2004 (aged 18)	1.86 m	11	74	(Germany) TSV Bayer 04 Leverkusen
20	P	Ariane Pfundstein	4 February 2004 (aged 18)	1.78 m	9	16	(Germany) TSV Bayer 04 Leverkusen
22	RB	Tabea Wipper	2 October 2005 (aged 16)	1.75 m	5	12	(Germany) SC Markranstädt
23	CB	Luise Albert	23 May 2004 (aged 18)	1.74 m	0	0	(Germany) Buxtehuder SV

=== Slovakia ===
The final squad was announced on 28 July 2022.

Head coach: Róbert Popluhár

No.	Pos.	Name	Date of birth (age)	Height	App.	Goals	Club
1	GK	Jana Kantorisová	22 December 2004 (aged 17)	1.70 m	0	0	(Slovakia) ŠŠK SLŠ Prešov
4	LW	Viktória Horňanová	22 February 2004 (aged 18)	1.73 m	0	0	(Slovakia) Sokol Bánovce nad Bebravou
8	LW	Laura Walterová	14 April 2005 (aged 17)	1.72 m	0	0	(Slovakia) Strojár Malacky
10	CB	Timea Susíková	29 December 2005 (aged 16)	1.67 m	0	0	(Slovakia) Handball Zlatná na Ostrove
11	P	Rebeka Kucserová	30 March 2004 (aged 18)	1.75 m	7	8	(Slovakia) HC DAC Dunajská Streda
12	GK	Petra Mruškovičová	10 August 2005 (aged 16)	1.78 m	0	0	(Slovakia) HK AS Trenčín
13	RW	Ema Rendvanská	1 February 2005 (aged 17)	1.70 m	0	0	(Slovakia) HK Slovan Duslo Šaľa
14	LW	Nikola Leštinová	24 January 2005 (aged 17)	1.65 m	0	0	(Slovakia) MHK Bytča
16	GK	Barbora Jakubíková	29 March 2004 (aged 18)	1.83 m	0	0	(Slovakia) IUVENTA Michalovce
17	P	Anna Kormanová	13 September 2004 (aged 17)	1.72 m	0	0	(Slovakia) HK Slovan Duslo Šaľa
18	CB	Dorota Bačenková	25 June 2004 (aged 18)	1.72 m	7	28	(Hungary) Kisvárdai KC
23	CB	Katarína Mydlová	22 April 2004 (aged 18)	1.74 m	0	0	(Czech Republic) DHC Slavia Prague
24	LB	Panna Hornyák	16 June 2004 (aged 18)	1.80 m	7	1	(Slovakia) HC DAC Dunajská Streda
26	LB	Radka Šalatová	21 March 2005 (aged 17)	1.81 m	0	0	(Slovakia) HK Slovan Duslo Šaľa
27	RB	Dáša Ondrijová	14 June 2005 (aged 17)	1.76 m	0	0	(Slovakia) ŠŠK SLŠ Prešov
29	P	Kristína Karkušová	16 December 2005 (aged 16)	1.71 m	0	0	(Slovakia) HC Tatran Stupava

=== South Korea ===
The final squad was announced on 27 July 2022.

Head coach: Kim Jin-sun

No.	Pos.	Name	Date of birth (age)	Height	App.	Goals	Club
4	RB	Lee Hye-won	16 May 2004 (aged 18)	1.68 m	0	0	(South Korea) Daegu Physical Education HS
7	RW	Kim Song-won	29 March 2004 (aged 18)	1.62 m	0	0	(South Korea) Incheon Business HS
9	P	Ahn Hye-in	28 February 2004 (aged 18)	1.69 m	0	0	(South Korea) Kyungnam Physical Education HS
10	LB	Lim Seo-young	17 August 2005 (aged 16)	1.74 m	0	0	(South Korea) Incheon Business HS
11	LW	Kim Seo-jin	4 December 2005 (aged 16)	1.63 m	0	0	(South Korea) Ilshin Girl's HS
12	GK	Kim Ga-yeong	16 July 2004 (aged 18)	1.77 m	0	0	(South Korea) Incheon Business HS
17	CB	Oh Yea-na	1 May 2004 (aged 18)	1.71 m	0	0	(South Korea) Kyungnam Physical Education HS
19	LB	Kim Jia	3 August 2005 (aged 16)	1.71 m	0	0	(South Korea) Ilshin Girl's HS
20	P	Lee Kyu-hee	8 February 2004 (aged 18)	1.78 m	0	0	(South Korea) Hwikyung Girls HS
21	CB	Park Ji-hyeon	21 November 2004 (aged 17)	1.64 m	0	0	(South Korea) Ilshin Girl's HS
23	CB	Kim Min-seo	14 February 2004 (aged 18)	1.60 m	0	0	(South Korea) Hwangji Information Industry HS
24	RW	Cha Seo-yeon	24 July 2004 (aged 18)	1.62 m	0	0	(South Korea) Ilshin Girl's HS
25	CB	Park Su-jeong	14 June 2005 (aged 17)	1.67 m	0	0	(South Korea) Hwikyung Girls HS
27	RB	Shin Jae-yeon	16 March 2004 (aged 18)	1.60 m	0	0	(South Korea) Hwangji Information Industry HS
33	P	Kim Se-jin	6 December 2005 (aged 16)	1.74 m	0	0	(South Korea) Hwangji Information Industry HS
77	GK	Choi Min-jeong	2 April 2004 (aged 18)	1.73 m	0	0	(South Korea) Cheonan Technical HS

=== Switzerland ===
The final squad was announced on 28 July 2022.

Head coach: Martin Albertsen, Jürgen Fleischmann

No.	Pos.	Name	Date of birth (age)	Height	App.	Goals	Club
1	GK	Seraina Kuratli	18 April 2007 (aged 15)	1.76 m	2	0	(Switzerland) LK Zug
3	RB	Emma Bächtiger	28 May 2004 (aged 18)	1.77 m	18	51	(Switzerland) LK Zug
4	RB	Noémie Suter	7 August 2005 (aged 16)	1.69 m	4	0	(Switzerland) LK Zug
6	P	Lynn Schürmann	3 April 2004 (aged 18)	1.81 m	12	9	(Switzerland) LK Zug
7	LB	Clairebel Coker	21 February 2005 (aged 17)	1.77 m	23	57	(Switzerland) LC Brühl
8	RW	Mia Emmenegger	17 January 2005 (aged 17)	1.61 m	20	76	(Switzerland) Spono Eagles
9	LB	Kim Erni	16 June 2005 (aged 17)	1.83 m	17	9	(Switzerland) GC Amicitia Zürich
10	P	Sara Zaetta	8 January 2004 (aged 18)	1.77 m	15	18	(Switzerland) LK Zug
11	P	Nora Snedkerud	21 January 2005 (aged 17)	1.80 m	14	24	(Switzerland) Spono Eagles
13	LW	Océane Meier	2 October 2004 (aged 17)	1.68 m	9	6	(Switzerland) GC Amicitia Zürich
14	CB	Nuria Bucher	21 March 2005 (aged 17)	1.79 m	18	46	(Switzerland) Spono Eagles
16	GK	Claire Hartz	2 September 2005 (aged 16)	1.81 m	14	1	(Switzerland) Spono Eagles
17	LW	Era Baumann	10 April 2007 (aged 15)	1.67 m	4	5	(Switzerland) GC Amicitia Zürich
18	LW	Alessia Riner	8 January 2004 (aged 18)	1.70 m	10	35	(Switzerland) LK Zug
18	LB	Yara Mosimann	10 May 2004 (aged 18)	1.74 m	14	44	(Switzerland) LC Brühl
20	RW	Sev Albrecht	26 April 2005 (aged 17)	1.68 m	15	45	(Switzerland) HV Herzogenbuchsee

== Group G ==
=== Brazil ===
The final squad was announced on 27 July 2022.

Head coach: Mauricio Antonucci

No.	Pos.	Name	Date of birth (age)	Height	App.	Goals	Club
1	GK	Manuella Navarro	4 November 2005 (aged 16)	1.79 m	4	0	(Brazil) EC Pinheiros
3	RB	Júlia Rodrigues	27 September 2004 (aged 17)	1.67 m	4	14	(Brazil) EC Pinheiros
4	LW	Elisa Jorge	25 April 2005 (aged 17)	1.65 m	4	8	(Brazil) EC Pinheiros
5	RW	Serena Borne	17 February 2004 (aged 18)	1.62 m	0	0	(Brazil) Clube Português do Recife
6	P	Gabriela da Cruz	8 April 2004 (aged 18)	1.82 m	4	10	(Brazil) Ass. Desport. Centro Olímpico – ADECO
7	LB	Kelly Rosa	26 January 2004 (aged 18)	1.78 m	4	29	(Brazil) EC Pinheiros
8	P	Lívia Oliveira	8 June 2004 (aged 18)	1.77 m	4	6	(Brazil) EC Pinheiros
9	RB	Maria de Oliveira	7 January 2005 (aged 17)	1.73 m	0	0	(Brazil) Liga Hamburguense de Handebol
10	LW	Ana dos Santos	30 January 2004 (aged 18)	1.64 m	4	8	(Brazil) A. A. UnC/Concórdia
13	CB	Eduarda Borges	10 January 2005 (aged 17)	1.64 m	4	7	(Brazil) Clube Português do Recife
14	P	Júlia Machado	16 January 2004 (aged 18)	1.66 m	4	6	(Brazil) EC Pinheiros
15	RW	Patricia Kaefer	14 May 2004 (aged 18)	1.70 m	4	8	(Brazil) A. A. UnC/Concórdia
18	CB	Alana da Cruz	28 September 2005 (aged 16)	1.68 m	4	2	(Brazil) EC Pinheiros
19	LB	Nathaly Soares	15 January 2005 (aged 17)	1.70 m	4	18	(Brazil) EC Pinheiros
24	RB	Maria e Silva	24 November 2004 (aged 17)	1.60 m	4	10	(Brazil) Clube Português do Recife
99	GK	Milene Queiroz	7 June 2004 (aged 18)	1.76 m	4	0	(Brazil) A. A. UnC/Concórdia

=== Czech Republic ===
The final squad was announced on 24 July 2022.

Head coach: Michal Červenka

No.	Pos.	Name	Date of birth (age)	Height	App.	Goals	Club
2	LW	Simona Horáková	22 February 2004 (aged 18)	1.61 m	8	6	(Czech Republic) DHK Zora Olomouc
3	RW	Eliška Jirásková	15 April 2004 (aged 18)	1.72 m	7	1	(Czech Republic) DHC Slavia Prague
4	LW	Anna Kubálková	23 November 2004 (aged 17)	1.76 m	17	48	(Czech Republic) DHK Zora Olomouc
5	LB	Veronika Gabrhelová	5 September 2005 (aged 16)	1.81 m	16	43	(Czech Republic) HC Zlín
6	CB	Karolína Rajová	26 May 2004 (aged 18)	1.72 m	2	2	(Czech Republic) TJ Sokol Poruba
7	LB	Adéla Protivová	4 May 2004 (aged 18)	1.81 m	6	16	(Czech Republic) DHK Baník Most
8	CB	Daniela Šimková	29 November 2005 (aged 16)	1.76 m	16	27	(Czech Republic) HC Zlín
9	LB	Simona Schreibmeierová	10 March 2005 (aged 17)	1.83 m	16	60	(Czech Republic) Jiskra Třeboň
10	CB	Valentina Schüllerová	30 May 2004 (aged 18)	1.77 m	6	5	(Czech Republic) DHK Baník Most
12	GK	Nikola Fadrná	27 August 2006 (aged 15)	1.73 m	3	0	(Czech Republic) HK Ivančice
15	P	Anna Jestříbková	29 February 2004 (aged 18)	1.78 m	19	30	(Czech Republic) DHC Slavia Prague
16	GK	Kristýna Stojarová	12 November 2004 (aged 17)	1.63 m	16	0	(Czech Republic) HC Zlín
19	LB	Veronika Vávrová	26 April 2005 (aged 17)	1.78 m	14	26	(Czech Republic) TJ Sokol Lázně Kynžvart
23	P	Klára Mrózková	2 January 2005 (aged 17)	1.76 m	12	12	(Czech Republic) TJ Sokol Poruba
24	RB	Adéla Mazánková	26 May 2005 (aged 17)	1.75 m	4	6	(Czech Republic) DHC Slavia Prague
25	LB	Eliška Řádová	5 November 2005 (aged 16)	1.75 m	16	21	(Czech Republic) DHK Baník Most
27	GK	Patricie Wizurová	1 June 2005 (aged 17)	1.85 m	10	1	(Czech Republic) TJ Sokol Lázně Kynžvart
28	CB	Natálie Rodeková	2 June 2005 (aged 17)	1.65 m	4	5	(Czech Republic) SK Žeravice

=== Norway ===
The final squad was announced on 4 July 2022.

Head coach: Kristine Lunde-Borgersen

No.	Pos.	Name	Date of birth (age)	Height	App.	Goals	Club
1	GK	Kadija Mårdalen	7 September 2004 (aged 17)	1.76 m	13	0	(Norway) Åsane
2	LW	Ingeborg Storbæk Monné	23 May 2004 (aged 18)	1.73 m	0	2	(Norway) Storhamar HE
3	RW	Nicoline Jullumstrø	9 August 2004 (aged 17)	1.63 m	10	30	(Norway) Haslum IL
5	RB	Constance Hedenstad	10 February 2005 (aged 17)	1.81 m	0	0	(Norway) Fjellhammer IL
6	LB	Mathea Enger	9 July 2004 (aged 18)	1.70 m	10	13	(Norway) Storhamar HE
8	LW	Selin Kamburce	12 January 2004 (aged 18)	1.66 m	3	11	(Norway) Romerike HK
9	RW	Linnea Skadal Kyrkjeeide	13 January 2004 (aged 18)	1.73 m	13	22	(Norway) Bjarg IL
11	P	Maria Grasdal	3 May 2004 (aged 18)	1.75 m	7	11	(Norway) Bjarg IL
12	GK	Dina Frisendal	31 July 2004 (aged 17)	1.77 m	13	0	(Norway) Sverresborg HK
14	LB	Emma Helland-Døvle	18 October 2004 (aged 17)	1.79 m	10	22	(Norway) Larvik Turn
18	P	Eline Mangen Solbakken	31 August 2004 (aged 17)	1.84 m	3	1	(Norway) Bjarg IL
20	CB	Marie Mjøs	15 April 2004 (aged 18)	1.71 m	0	0	(Norway) Fyllingen Håndball
24	RB	Mia Kvarme	9 June 2005 (aged 17)	1.73 m	6	8	(Norway) Stabæk IF
25	P	Viktoria Giske	16 October 2004 (aged 17)	1.75 m	10	14	(Norway) Sola HK
26	LB	Nora Rosenberg	15 March 2005 (aged 17)	1.81 m	6	14	(Norway) Halsen IF
27	CB	Stine Mellemstrand Bore	17 February 2005 (aged 17)	1.70 m	6	23	(Norway) Sola HK
28	GK	Anna Janicijevic Malesevic	6 October 2004 (aged 17)	1.79 m	2	0	(Norway) Storhamar HE
33	LB	Edle Hønningstad	24 June 2004 (aged 18)	1.79 m	0	0	(Norway) Storhamar HE

=== Uruguay ===
The final squad was announced on 21 July 2022.

Head coach: Rodrigo Olalde

No.	Pos.	Name	Date of birth (age)	Height	App.	Goals	Club
1	GK	Lucía Fernandez	8 May 2004 (aged 18)	1.77 m	10	0	(Uruguay) Unión
2	LB	Martina Campos	25 December 2005 (aged 16)	1.67 m	10	20	(Uruguay) AEBU
3	RB	Manuela Machado	24 November 2004 (aged 17)	1.68 m	13	5	(Uruguay) Layva
4	RB	Martina Márquez	31 December 2005 (aged 16)	1.67 m	13	15	(Uruguay) Goes
7	P	Emiliana Heilmann	23 September 2004 (aged 17)	1.82 m	9	20	(Spain) Morvedre
8	LW	Clara Fernández	22 November 2004 (aged 17)	1.58 m	5	5	(Uruguay) Layva
9	LW	María González	4 February 2004 (aged 18)	1.65 m	5	8	(Uruguay) Colegio Alemán
11	CB	Clara Barthaburu	12 February 2004 (aged 18)	1.66 m	13	68	(Uruguay) Unión
12	P	Maite Dabo	10 February 2004 (aged 18)	1.72 m	13	18	(Uruguay) AEBU
13	RB	María Castro	30 April 2004 (aged 18)	1.73 m	13	8	(Uruguay) Colegio Alemán
14	LW	Catalina Galán	11 June 2004 (aged 18)	1.69 m	5	2	(Uruguay) Layva
18	GK	Virginia Antoria	24 December 2005 (aged 16)	1.67 m	0	0	(Uruguay) Scuola Italiana
23	CB	Martina López	20 July 2004 (aged 18)	1.72 m	8	12	(Uruguay) Náutico
24	LB	Delfina Fonticiella	24 July 2004 (aged 18)	1.78 m	0	0	(Uruguay) AEBU
31	LB	Paula Zebraitis	13 December 2005 (aged 16)	1.70 m	0	0	(Uruguay) AEBU
32	LW	Pia Batista	31 March 2005 (aged 17)	1.70 m	0	0	(Uruguay) AEBU
41	P	Savina Bergara	21 November 2005 (aged 16)	1.75 m	0	0	(Spain) Aula Valladolid

== Group H ==
=== Argentina ===
The final squad was announced on 11 July 2022.

Head coach: Martín Duhau

No.	Pos.	Name	Date of birth (age)	Height	App.	Goals	Club
2	LW	Ailin Cabaña	15 November 2004 (aged 17)	1.62 m	4	12	(Argentina) Cideco
3	CB	Martina Layus	18 August 2004 (aged 17)	1.59 m	4	17	(Argentina) Cideco
4	CB	Miranda Kruk	13 June 2005 (aged 17)	1.73 m	5	31	(Argentina) Sedalo
5	LB	Martina Tajes	16 January 2004 (aged 18)	1.65 m	4	14	(Argentina) Ballester
6	LW	Milagros García	19 August 2004 (aged 17)	1.72 m	4	0	(Argentina) Sedalo
8	RB	Azul Spinelli	4 September 2004 (aged 17)	1.72 m	8	20	(Argentina) Dorrego
9	LB	Sofia Gull Querin	3 September 2005 (aged 16)	1.87 m	8	31	(Argentina) Quilmes
11	RW	Camila Carrizo	26 April 2005 (aged 17)	1.65 m	10	23	(Argentina) Maipú
12	GK	Florencia Carrasco	14 February 2005 (aged 17)	1.69 m	6	0	(Argentina) Ferro
14	CB	Luciana Duhau	30 June 2004 (aged 18)	1.59 m	4	3	(Argentina) Ferro
15	P	Kiara Manzo	4 August 2005 (aged 16)	1.70 m	4	15	(Argentina) Cideco
16	GK	Candelaria Cuadrado	3 July 2004 (aged 18)	1.80 m	9	0	(Argentina) Sedalo
17	P	Zoe Oriolo	17 January 2005 (aged 17)	1.78 m	4	4	(Argentina) Ferro
19	RB	Daniela Medina	18 February 2004 (aged 18)	1.70 m	4	10	(Argentina) Sedalo
22	RW	Iara Caceres	26 April 2004 (aged 18)	1.60 m	0	0	(Argentina) Dorrego
30	LB	Guadalupe Olivares	25 July 2004 (aged 18)	1.67 m	3	5	(Argentina) Maipú

=== France ===
The final squad was announced on 29 July 2022.

Head coach: Oliver De La Fuente

No.	Pos.	Name	Date of birth (age)	Height	App.	Goals	Club
1	GK	Emma Lazzari	31 July 2004 (aged 17)	1.74 m	0	0	(France) Strasbourg
3	CB	Marylou Rangier	3 January 2004 (aged 18)	1.61 m	2	2	(France) Chambray
5	RW	Manon Errard	9 February 2005 (aged 17)	1.78 m	8	7	(France) Metz
6	LB	Fatou Karamoko	14 December 2005 (aged 16)	1.76 m	10	22	(France) Stella Saint-Maur
7	RW	Romane Lelong	1 August 2005 (aged 16)	1.70 m	5	6	(France) Colombelles
10	RW	Emma Tuccella	8 January 2004 (aged 18)	1.68 m	8	12	(France) Metz
12	GK	Romane Le Huault-Parc	23 April 2005 (aged 17)	1.83 m	4	0	(France) Brest
13	LW	Délia Golvet	20 October 2005 (aged 16)	1.65 m	8	10	(France) Ducos
14	LW	Nina Dury	16 January 2004 (aged 18)	1.75 m	4	4	(France) Dijon
15	P	Carla Broquaire	24 May 2004 (aged 18)	1.76 m	4	6	(France) Brest
16	GK	Shana Wanda	23 April 2005 (aged 17)	1.93 m	8	17	(France) Vaulx-en-Velin
17	LB	Assa Sissoko	13 January 2005 (aged 17)	1.73 m	8	14	(France) Cergy
18	CB	Nina Perret	12 September 2004 (aged 17)	1.72 m	4	8	(France) Dijon
20	P	Clémence Nkindanda	20 June 2004 (aged 18)	1.89 m	8	14	(France) Chambray
21	LB	Enola Borg	31 May 2005 (aged 17)	1.79 m	8	7	(France) Mios Biganos
23	CB	Juliette Louveau	14 September 2005 (aged 16)	1.90 m	2	3	(France) Lomme
24	CB	Lylou Borg	31 May 2005 (aged 17)	1.75 m	5	6	(France) Mios Biganos

=== Hungary ===
The final squad was announced on 25 July 2022.

Head coach: Beáta Bohus

No.	Pos.	Name	Date of birth (age)	Height	App.	Goals	Club
3	LB	Emília Varga	14 July 2004 (aged 18)	1.84 m	7	19	(Hungary) NEKA
5	LB	Luca Csíkos	25 February 2005 (aged 17)	1.79 m	7	19	(Hungary) NEKA
7	CB	Petra Simon	12 November 2004 (aged 17)	1.68 m	7	35	(Hungary) Ferencváros
8	P	Kata Juhász	2 January 2004 (aged 18)	1.83 m	7	11	(Hungary) NEKA
9	GK	Szofi Imre	21 June 2004 (aged 18)	1.77 m	7	0	(Hungary) Ferencváros
15	GK	Kincső Sass	11 August 2004 (aged 17)	1.78 m	7	1	(Hungary) Pénzügyőr
17	LB	Anna Panyi	18 May 2004 (aged 18)	1.79 m	3	2	(Hungary) Debrecen
18	CB	Liliána Csernyánszki	25 August 2004 (aged 17)	1.64 m	8	28	(Hungary) Debrecen
21	RW	Csenge Kiss	12 April 2005 (aged 17)	1.78 m	0	0	(Hungary) Dunaújváros
22	LB	Lili Bucsi	11 July 2004 (aged 18)	1.74 m	7	21	(Hungary) Békéscsaba
28	GK	Klára Zaj	5 September 2004 (aged 17)	1.80 m	7	0	(Hungary) NEKA
34	RW	Léna Gém	5 February 2004 (aged 18)	1.60 m	0	0	(Hungary) Ferencváros
36	P	Lili Szabó	17 July 2004 (aged 18)	1.79 m	7	6	(Hungary) NEKA
50	LB	Luca Kármán	18 July 2004 (aged 18)	1.90 m	4	2	(Hungary) Ferencváros
67	RW	Dorottya Molnár	6 February 2005 (aged 17)	1.69 m	7	17	(Hungary) NEKA
80	P	Luca Kövér	1 March 2005 (aged 17)	1.78 m	0	0	(Hungary) Győr
96	CB	Bianka Kovalcsik	10 September 2004 (aged 17)	1.76 m	2	4	(Hungary) NEKA
99	LW	Anna Szabó	11 June 2004 (aged 18)	1.77 m	7	22	(Hungary) NEKA

=== Spain ===
The final squad was announced on 18 July 2022.

Head coach: Pablo Perea

No.	Pos.	Name	Date of birth (age)	Height	App.	Goals	Club
1	GK	Andrea Suárez	17 December 2004 (aged 17)	1.78 m	10	0	(Spain) Rocasa Gran Canaria
2	P	Lyndie Tchaptchet	13 January 2005 (aged 17)	1.85 m	13	41	(Spain) CD Beti Onak
3	LB	Carmen Arroyo	3 March 2004 (aged 18)	1.80 m	10	22	(Spain) Doña Berenguela
4	RW	Vanesa Rubio	17 April 2004 (aged 18)	1.80 m	0	0	(Spain) Levante UDBM Marni
5	P	Paula Pérez	9 January 2004 (aged 18)	1.80 m	9	17	(Spain) Handbol Sant Quirze
6	CB	Blanca Benítez	28 March 2004 (aged 18)	1.58 m	13	26	(Spain) Balonmano Montequinto
7	LB	Ester Somaza	3 June 2004 (aged 18)	1.78 m	10	58	(Spain) BM La Roca
8	RB	Eider Poles	10 November 2005 (aged 16)	1.72 m	13	62	(Spain) Handbol Onda
9	LB	Alba Tort	16 November 2004 (aged 17)	1.82 m	0	0	(Spain) CH Palautordera
10	LW	Lucía Laguna	30 October 2004 (aged 17)	1.73 m	2	1	(Spain) Core Global Parla
11	RW	Uxue Morentín	18 October 2004 (aged 17)	1.74 m	10	11	(Spain) Helvetia Anaitasuna
12	GK	Sabina Mínguez	28 June 2004 (aged 18)	1.77 m	5	0	(Spain) Handbol Mislata
13	RB	Esther Martín-Buró	17 January 2005 (aged 17)	1.77 m	5	6	(Spain) CBM Manzanares
15	LW	Ugazi Manterola	18 November 2004 (aged 17)	1.69 m	12	28	(Spain) Aiala Zarautz
16	LW	Miren Gárate	4 November 2004 (aged 17)	1.68 m	0	0	(Spain) Aiala Zarautz
17	LB	María Cobo	9 May 2005 (aged 17)	1.76 m	0	0	(Spain) Handbol Mislata
