= H71 (women's handball) =

Faroese women's handball club

Hondbóltsfelagið H71
- Full name: Hondbóltsfelagið H71
- Short name: H71
- Founded: 1971; 55 years ago
- Arena: Hoyvíkshøllin, Hoyvík
- President: Anna Dam
- Head coach: Rasmus Rygaard Poulsen
- League: SMS Deildin
- 2024–25: 4th
- Club colours
Home	Away

Hondbóltsfelagið H71 is a Faroese women's handball club from Hoyvík currently competing in the Faroese Women's Handball League (SMS Deildin). The team is the women's section of Hondbóltsfelagið H71. They also competed in the 2024–25 Women's EHF European Cup.

In the 2024–25, the team finished 4th in the regular standings. Nevertheless, they were defeated by VÍF in the quarterfinals with the final score 28–31.

Location of H71

== Titles ==
- Faroese Women's Handball League
  - Winner (2) : 2022, 2023
- Faroe Islands Cup
  - Winner (1) : 2023
  - Runners-up (1) 2022

== Team ==
=== Current squad ===
Squad for the 2024–25 season

H71

Goalkeepers

- 1 (Faroe Islands) Rúna Jógvansdóttir Larsen
- 12 (Faroe Islands) Alda Av Skarði
- 16 (Faroe Islands) Maria Beder
- 71 (Faroe Islands) Anita Dahl

Left Wingers

- 4 (Faroe Islands) Rakúl Christiansen
- 14 (Faroe Islands) Teresa Jacobsen
- 15 (Faroe Islands) Tóra Róadóttir
- 20 (Faroe Islands) Christina Arge
- 22 (Faroe Islands) Karin Holm Simonsen
- 33 (Faroe Islands) Sára Djurhuus Vedelsbøl

Right Wingers

- 8 (Faroe Islands) Karin Egholm
- 9 (Faroe Islands) Karina Debes Heinesen
- 66 (Faroe Islands) Brynhild Pálsdóttir
- 99 (Faroe Islands) Guðrið Bogadóttir Á Borg

Line Players

- 19 (Faroe Islands) Sóley Vinther
- 48 (Denmark) Sofie Kornelius

Left Backs

- 2 (Faroe Islands) Elsa Egholm
- 6 (Faroe Islands) Marta Agnarsdóttir Højgaard
- 18 (Faroe Islands) Karin Fossabrúgv
- 21 (Faroe Islands) Fjóla Skaalum Vilhelm
- 88 (Faroe Islands) Elida Joensen

Central Backs

- 7 (Faroe Islands) Anna Elisabeth Halsdóttir Weyhe
- 10 (Faroe Islands) Silja Geirsdóttir Eystberg
- 11 (Faroe Islands) Lukka Arge
- 17 (Faroe Islands) Maria Hálsdóttir Weyhe
- 24 (Faroe Islands) Lea Sesilia Lava Brockie
- 27 (Faroe Islands) Sará Berg á Lag

Right Backs

- 13 (Faroe Islands) Inga Maria Joensen

=== Technical staff ===
- Head coach: (Denmark) Rasmus Rygaard Poulsen
- Assistant coach: (Denmark) Sebastian Christensen
- Assistant coach: (Faroe Islands) Gilli Lorenzen
- Goalkeeping coach: (Faroe Islands) Ára Egason Dam
- Physiotherapist: (Denmark) Ingilín Holm

=== Transfers ===
Transfers for the 2025–26 season

Joining

Leaving
