= Turið Arge Samuelsen =

Faroese handball player (born 1994)

Personal information
- Full name: Turið Arge Samuelsen
- Nationality: Faroese
- Born: 27 December 1994 (age 31) Tórshavn, Faroe Islands
- Height: 1.63 m (5 ft 4 in)

Sport
- Sport: Handball
- Position: Left wing
- Current club: Kyndil
- Number: 33

Senior clubs
- Years: Team
- 2014–: Kyndil
National team
Years	Team	Apps	(Gls)
2011–2024	Faroe Islands	45	(135)

Turið Arge Samuelsen (born 27 December 1994) is a Faroese handball player for Kyndil and previously the Faroese national team. Samuelsen won the Faroese Women's Handball League with Kyndil in 2019 for the third time in her career. Furthermore, Samuelsen has a law degree and works alongside handball in the Faroese Ministry of Education, Research and Culture.

== Career ==
She participated with the Faroese national team at the 2024 European Women's Handball Championship in Hungary, Switzerland and Austria, placing 17th overall. At the tournament, Samuelsen scored 9 goals in the first three matches of the preliminary round in which Faroe Islands was eliminated in. This was the first time Feroe Islands ever made a major international tournament.

Regarding her record on the Faroese national team, Samuelsen is the all-time top scorer with just 135 goals. On 7 December 2024, she announced her retirement from the National team.

== Achievements ==
- Faroese Women's Handball League
  - Winner (5) : 2014, 2017, 2019, 2024, 2026
- Faroese Handball Cup
  - Winner (6) : 2017, 2019, 2022, 2024, 2025, 2026
