= HIFK Handboll =

Finnish handball club

- Full name: Idrottsföreningen kamraterna i Helsingfors
- Short name: HIFK
- Founded: 1943; 83 years ago
- Arena: Helsingin Urheilutalo, Helsinki
- Capacity: 860
- Head coach: Rostislav Grinishin
- League: SM-liiga
- Club colours

HIFK Handboll is a Finnish professional handball club from Helsinki. HIFK Handboll is the handball section of HIFK. The club is playing in the Finnish Handball League (SM-liiga), and play their home matches in Helsingin Urheilutalo.

Location of HIFK Handboll

== History ==
HIFK was founded in 1897. The handball department was founded in the club in 1943. The Finnish handball championship has existed since 1944, HIFK was already a founding member of the championship series in the first season. In 1945, the team became champion in its second league season, and won the second gold in 1951. So far, the club is a total of 7 champions and 5 cup winners.

== Crest, colours, supporters ==
=== Kits ===
HOME
2011–12	2016–17	2018–20	2022–23

AWAY

2018–20

== Sports Hall information ==
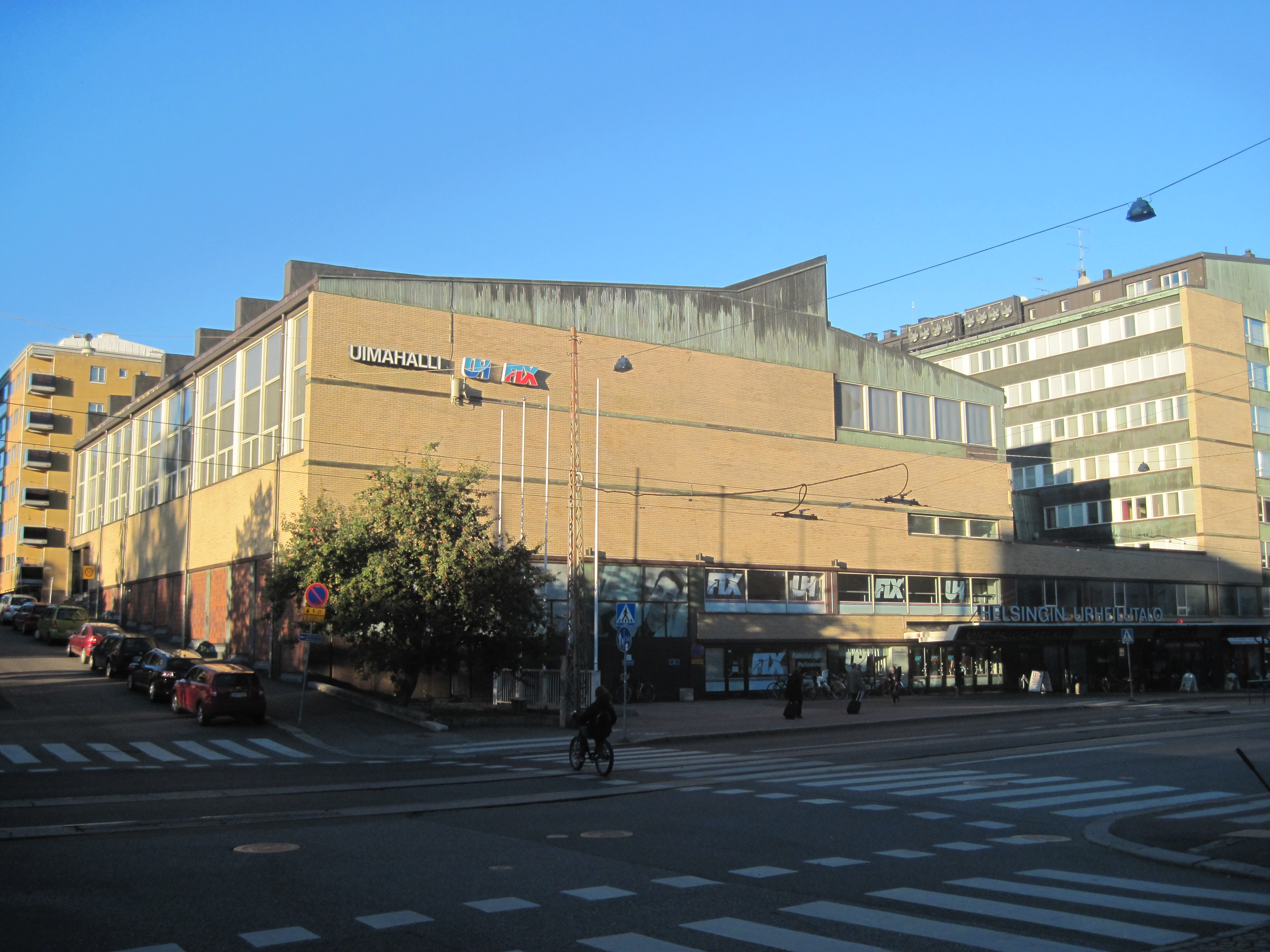
Home hall: Helsingin Urheilutalo

- Name: – Helsingin Urheilutalo
- City: – Helsinki
- Capacity: – 860
- Address: – Helsinginkatu 25, 00510 Helsinki, Finland

== Team ==
=== Current squad ===
Squad for the 2023–24 season

HIFK Handboll

Goalkeepers

- 12 (Sweden) Martin Börjes
- 26 (Finland) Viljo Ukkonen
- 29 (Finland) Niklas Zilliacus

Left Wingers

- 38 (Sweden) Linus Svensson
- 64 (Finland) Jakob Meinander

Right Wingers

- 3 (Finland) Altti Kolkki
- 22 (Russia) Vladimir Knopinskii
- 60 (Finland) Vili Leppänen

Line Players

- 6 (Finland) Viktor Grönmark
- 14 (Finland) Nicolas Reenpää
- 18 (Finland) Samuel Elmvik

Left Backs

- 23 (Finland) André Udd
- 34 (Finland) Oskari Suopajärvi

Central Backs

- 10 (Finland) Kristian Jansson
- 91 (Finland) Joel Hagström

Right Backs

- 13 (Portugal) Rui Rolo

=== Technical staff ===
- Head coach: (Russia) Rostislav Grinishin
- Coach: (Sweden) Tommy Suoraniemi
- Physiotherapist: (Finland) Ronny Zetterborg

=== Transfers ===
Transfers for the 2023–24 season

Joining

- (Sweden) Linus Svensson (LW) from (Sweden) IFK Ystad HK
- (Sweden) Martin Börjes (GK) from (Sweden) Täby HBK
- (Finland) Niklas Zilliacus (GK) from (Finland) GrIFK
- (Finland) Kristian Jansson (CB) from (Finland) ÅIFK

Leaving

- (Belarus) Evgeny Semenov (RB) (retires)
- (Belarus) Aliaksandr Tsitou (LP) (retires)
- (Finland) Oscar Udd (LB) (retires)

== Titles ==
- SM-liiga
  - Winner (7) : 1945, 1951, 1965, 1966, 1972, 1973, 1974
- Finnish Cup
  - Winner (14) : 1975, 1981, 1984, 1988, 2014

== EHF ranking ==
As of 6/12/2023

Rank	Team	Points
155	(Switzerland) HSC Suhr Aarau	29
156	(Poland) MMTS Kwidzyn	29
157	(Italy) Pallamano Conversano	28
158	(Finland) HIFK Handboll	27
159	(Faroe Islands) VÍF	26
160	(Croatia) MRK Trogir	26
161	(Bosnia and Herzegovina) RK Leotar	26

== Former club members ==
=== Notable former players ===
- (Australia) (Sweden) Kristofer Karlsson (2018–2021)
- (Belarus) Evgeny Semenov (2021–2023)
- (Belarus) Aliaksandr Tsitou (2021–2023)
