= Melissa Petrén =

Swedish handball player (born 1995)

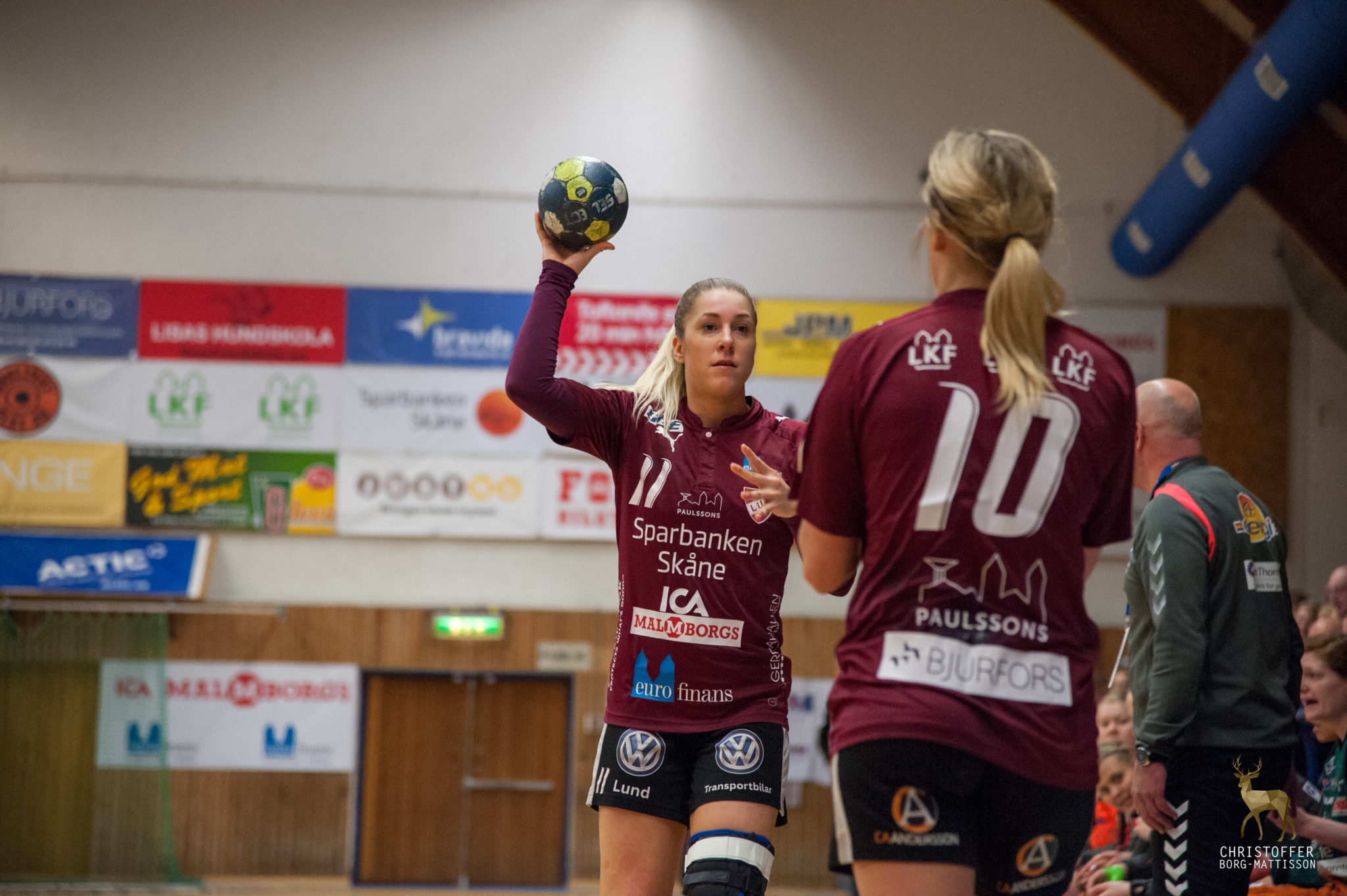

Personal information
- Full name: Melissa Maria Petrén
- Nationality: Swedish
- Born: 18 January 1995 (age 31) Huddinge, Sweden
- Height: 1.73 m (5 ft 8 in)

Sport
- Sport: Handball
- Position: Left back / Centre back
- Current club: SønderjyskE Damehåndbold
- Number: 9

Senior clubs
- Years: Team
- –2013: Huddinge HK
- 2013–2015: Spårvägens HF
- 2015–2019: Lugi HF
- 2019–2021: HH Elite
- 2021–2022: København Håndbold
- 2022–2023: Viborg HK
- 2023–2024: Ringkøbing Håndbold
- 2024: Ikast Håndbold
- 2024–2025: SønderjyskE Damehåndbold
- 2025–: IF Hallby
National team
Years	Team	Apps	(Gls)
2018–	Sweden	62	(114)
Medal record
EHF Youth European Championship
Gold medal – first place	2013 Poland

Melissa Maria Petrén (born 18 January 1995) is a Swedish handballer for SønderjyskE Damehåndbold and the Swedish national team.

In the 2019-2020 season while playing for HH Elite she scored the second most goals in the Danish handball league with 140 goals. She was surpassed only by Mia Rej with 170 goals.

== Achievements ==
- EHF Youth European Championship:
  - Gold Medalist: 2013

== Individual awards ==
- Swedish Elitserien Breakthrough of the Year: 2017
- All-Star Left Wing of the Swedish Elitserien: 2017
