= Faroese Men's Handball League =

Faroese sports league

Burn Menn League
- Sport: Handball
- Founded: 1943; 83 years ago
- No. of teams: 8
- Country: Faroe Islands
- Most recent champion: H71
- Most titles: Kyndil Tórshavn (31)

Burn Menn League is the highest league in the league system of handball on the Faroe Islands and comprises the top 7 Faroese handball teams. The first season began in 1942–43.

== Current teams ==
=== Teams for season 2023–24 ===
Team	Location as shown on map
VÍF	Vestmanna
H71	Hoyvík
Kyndil Tórshavn	Tórshavn
Hondbóltsfelagið Neistin	Tórshavn
KÍF	Kollafjørður
Team Klaksvík	Klaksvík
Stranda ÍF	Strendur

Location of teams in 2023–24 Burn Menn League

== Past champions ==
- 1943 : Stranda ÍF
- 1944 : Stranda ÍF (2)
- 1945 : Stranda ÍF (3)
- 1946 : not awarded
- 1947 : not awarded
- 1948 : VÍF
- 1949 : Hondbóltsfelagið Neistin
- 1950 : VÍF (2)
- 1951 : VÍF (3)
- 1952 : VÍF (4)
- 1953 : Hondbóltsfelagið Neistin (2)
- 1954 : VÍF (5)
- 1955 : Hondbóltsfelagið Neistin (3)
- 1956 : SÍF Sandavágur
- 1957 : VÍF (6)
- 1958 : Kyndil Tórshavn
- 1959 : Kyndil Tórshavn (2)
- 1960 : Kyndil Tórshavn (3)
- 1961 : not awarded
- 1962 : Kyndil Tórshavn (4)
- 1963 : Kyndil Tórshavn (5)
- 1964 : Kyndil Tórshavn (6)
- 1965 : Kyndil Tórshavn (7)
- 1966 : Kyndil Tórshavn (8)
- 1967 : Kyndil Tórshavn (9)
- 1968 : VÍF (7)
- 1969 : Kyndil Tórshavn (10)
- 1970 : Kyndil Tórshavn (11)
- 1971 : Kyndil Tórshavn (12)
- 1972 : Kyndil Tórshavn (13)
- 1973 : Kyndil Tórshavn (14)
- 1974 : Kyndil Tórshavn (15)
- 1975 : VÍF (8)
- 1976 : Kyndil Tórshavn (16)
- 1977 : Kyndil Tórshavn (17)
- 1978 : Hondbóltsfelagið Neistin (4)
- 1979 : Kyndil Tórshavn (18)
- 1980 : VÍF (9)
- 1981 : Kyndil Tórshavn (19)
- 1982 : VÍF (10)
- 1983 : VÍF (11)
- 1984 : Kyndil Tórshavn (20)
- 1985 : VÍF (12)
- 1986 : VÍF (13)
- 1987 : VÍF (14)
- 1988 : Kyndil Tórshavn (21)
- 1989 : Kyndil Tórshavn (22)
- 1990 : Kyndil Tórshavn (23)
- 1991 : Kyndil Tórshavn (24)
- 1992 : Kyndil Tórshavn (25)
- 1993 : VÍF (15)
- 1994 : Kyndil Tórshavn (26)
- 1995 : VÍF (16)
- 1996 : Kyndil Tórshavn (27)
- 1997 : VÍF (17)
- 1998 : VÍF (18)
- 1999 : Stranda ÍF (4)
- 2000 : Hondbóltsfelagið Neistin (5)
- 2001 : VÍF (19)
- 2002 : VÍF (20)
- 2003 : Stranda ÍF (5)
- 2004 : Kyndil Tórshavn (28)
- 2005 : VÍF (21)
- 2006 : Kyndil Tórshavn (29)
- 2007 : Kyndil Tórshavn (30)
- 2008 : Hondbóltsfelagið Neistin (6)
- 2009 : H71
- 2010 : Hondbóltsfelagið Neistin (7)
- 2011 : Hondbóltsfelagið Neistin (8)
- 2012 : H71 (2)
- 2013 : KÍF
- 2014 : KÍF (2)
- 2015 : VÍF (22)
- 2016 : VÍF (23)
- 2017 : H71 (3)
- 2018 : H71 (4)
- 2019 : H71 (5)
- 2020 : not awarded
- 2021 : VÍF (24)
- 2022 : H71 (6)
- 2023 : H71 (7)
- 2024 : H71 (8)
- 2025 : Kyndil Tórshavn (31)
- 2026 : H71 (9)

Numbers of titles won by each club
	Club	Numbers of titles	Years
1.	Kyndil Tórshavn	31	1958, 1959, 1960, 1962, 1963, 1964, 1965, 1966, 1967, 1969, 1970, 1971, 1972, 1973, 1974, 1976, 1977, 1979, 1981, 1984, 1988, 1989, 1990, 1991, 1992, 1994, 1996, 2004, 2006, 2007, 2025
2.	VÍF	24	1948, 1950, 1951, 1952, 1954, 1957, 1968, 1975, 1980, 1982, 1983, 1985, 1986, 1987, 1993, 1995, 1997, 1998, 2001, 2002, 2005, 2015, 2016, 2021
3.	H71	9	2009, 2012, 2017, 2018, 2019, 2022, 2023, 2024, 2026
4.	Hondbóltsfelagið Neistin	8	1949, 1953, 1955, 1978, 2000, 2008, 2010, 2011
5.	Stranda ÍF	5	1997, 1999
6.	KÍF	2	2013, 2014
7.	SÍF Sandavágur	1	1956
