= Bjarta Osberg Johansen =

Faroese handball player (born 1993)

Personal information
- Full name: Bjarta Osberg Johansen
- Nationality: Faroese
- Born: 28 April 1993 (age 33) Tórshavn, Denmark
- Height: 1.71 m (5 ft 7 in)

Sport
- Sport: Handball
- Position: Pivot
- Current club: Kyndil

Senior clubs
- Years: Team
- –: Kyndil
- 2017–2018: Aalborg HK
- 2018–2021: Vendsyssel Håndbold
- 2021–: Kyndil
National team
| Years | Team | Apps | (Gls) |
| – | Faroe Islands | 44 | (39) |
- Updated on November 2025

Bjarta Osberg Johansen (born 28 April 1993) is a Faroese handballer who plays for Kyndil and the Faroe Islands women's national team.

She played for Kyndil in her home country before moving to Denmark in 2017 to study. Here she played for Aalborg HK, before joining Danish second tier side Vendsyssel Håndbold in the winter of 2018. In the 2020–21 season she helped the team getting promoted to the Damehåndboldligaen, but she would not play there herself as she returned to Kyndil in 2021.

Her first major international tournament was the 2024 European Women's Handball Championship, which was also the first ever major international tournament for Faroes Islands ever. At the 2025 World Championship she was part of Faroe Islands team that played for the first time at a World Championship. With wins over Spain and Paraguay they advanced from the preliminary groups and recorded their first ever win at a major international tournament.

Johansen has the highest number of caps for the Faroe Islands women's national handball team of players still active.
