= Azeryol HC =

Azerbaijan handball club

- Full name: Azeryol Handball Club
- Founded: 2006; 19 years ago
- Arena: ABU Arena, Baku
- Head coach: Aliyev Vidadi
- League: Azerbaijan Handball Premier League
- Club colours

Azeryol HC (Azerbaijani: Azəryol Həndbol) is a men's handball club from Baku in Azerbaijan. Azeryol HC competes in the Azerbaijan Handball Premier League.

Location of Azeryol HC

== History ==
Azeryol HC is a professional handball team based in Baku, Azerbaijan. The team was founded in 2006 and has since become one of the most successful handball clubs in the country.

== Team ==
=== Current squad ===
Squad for the 2023–24 season

Azeryol HC

Goalkeepers

- 1 (Azerbaijan) Aziz Mansurov
- 12 (Russia) Rustam Guseinov
- 16 (Azerbaijan) Huseyn Gafarov

Left Wingers

- 9 (Russia) Kirill Razumov
- 13 (Azerbaijan) Kamran Adigozalov

Right Wingers

- 11 (Azerbaijan) Fada Yusifov
- 18 (Azerbaijan) Islam Slemanov
- 77 (Azerbaijan) Emil Eyyublu

Line Players

- 8 (Azerbaijan) Amin Mehdiyev
- 21 (Azerbaijan) Kamran Rustamli
- 26 (Azerbaijan) Nicat Azizov

Left Backs

- 23 (Georgia (country)) Giorgi Peradze
- 27 (Russia) Mikhail Sokolov

Central Backs

- 33 (Georgia (country)) Akaki Patashuri
- 99 (Azerbaijan) Sadig Arikhov

Right Backs

- 7 (Azerbaijan) Emil Sarkhanov
- 10 (Azerbaijan) Ramil Huseynov
- 17 (Azerbaijan) Sabir Nazaraliyev

=== Technical staff ===
- Head coach: (Azerbaijan) Aliyev Vidadi
- Club doctor: (Azerbaijan) Lyudmila Abbasguliyeva

=== Transfers ===
Transfers for the 2023–24 season

Joining

- (Azerbaijan) Huseyn Gafarov (GK) from (Azerbaijan) HC Baku
- (Azerbaijan) Amin Mehdiyev (LP) from (Azerbaijan) HC Baku
- (Azerbaijan) Nicat Azizov (LP) from (Azerbaijan) HC Baku
- (Azerbaijan) Sabir Nazaraliyev (RB) from (Azerbaijan) HC Baku

Leaving

== EHF ranking ==
As of 26/10/2023

| Rank | Team | Points |
|---|---|---|
| 216 | (Finland) Dicken | 9 |
| 217 | (Faroe Islands) Neistin | 9 |
| 218 | (Turkey) Sakarya Büyüksehir BSK | 9 |
| 219 | (Azerbaijan) Azeryol HC | 9 |
| 220 | (Faroe Islands) Team Klaksvík | 9 |
| 221 | (Denmark) Ribe-Esbjerg HH | 9 |
| 222 | (Czech Republic) HK FCC Město Lovosice | 9 |
