= Vestmanna ÍF (women's handball) =

Faroese women's handball club

- Full name: Vestmanna ÍF
- Short name: VÍF
- Founded: 1942; 84 years ago
- Arena: Ítróttarhøllin í Vestmanna, Vestmanna
- Capacity: 200
- President: Eyð Hansen
- Head coach: Ingi Olsen
- League: SMS Deildin
- 2024–25: 3rd
- Club colours
Home	Away

Vestmanna ÍF is a Faroese women's handball club from Vestmanna, currently competing in the Faroese Women's Handball League (SMS Deildin). They also competed in the 2024–25 Women's EHF European Cup, but were eliminated following a defeat to Italian PDO Handball Team Salerno.

In the 2023-24 season, the team claimed a bronze medal in the SMS Deildin after beating Neistin 38–37 in the third place match. They've won the Faroese Women's Handball League six times, at the latest in 2018.

Location of VÍF

== Crest, colours, supporters ==
=== Kits ===
HOME
2022-23	2023-24

== Titles ==
- Faroese Women's Handball League
  - Winner (6) : 1951, 1963, 1968, 2001, 2002, 2018
- Faroese Cup (Steypavinnarar)
  - Winner (4) : 1999, 2001, 2002, 2018

== Team ==
=== Current squad ===
Squad for the 2024–25 season

H71

Goalkeepers

- 1 (Denmark) Ida Mai Nielsen
- 12 (Faroe Islands) Vivian Petersen
- 16 (Faroe Islands) Julianna Olsen

Left Wingers

- 3 (Faroe Islands) Lea Mørk
- 4 (Faroe Islands) Rannvá Olsen

Right Wingers

- 25 (Faroe Islands) Bjørg Á Líknargøta
- 28 (Faroe Islands) Rakul Borgarlið Joensen

Line Players

- 20 (Norway) Lise Marie Nesse Evansen
- 24 (Faroe Islands) Sigrid Sóleygardóttir Hórdará

Left Backs

- 9 (Faroe Islands) Friða Olsen
- 6 (Faroe Islands) Ingibjørg Olsen
- 18 (Faroe Islands) Drós Ragnarsdóttir

Central Backs

- 4 (Faroe Islands) Agnas Funn
- 14 (Faroe Islands) Gunnvá Frida Bárdadóttir Nielsen

Right Backs

- 10 (Faroe Islands) Durita Christophersen Jojic
- 11 (Montenegro) Anita Muratović
- 13 (Denmark) Mille Lund Dahl

=== Technical staff ===
- Head coach: (Faroe Islands) Ingi Olsen
- Assistant coach: (Faroe Islands) Johnny Joensen
- Team Leader: (Faroe Islands) Bjørg Olsen

=== Transfers ===
Transfers for the 2025–26 season

Joining

Leaving
