= H71 (men's handball) =

Faroese handball club

Hondbóltsfelagið H71
- Full name: Hondbóltsfelagið H71
- Short name: H71
- Founded: 1971; 55 years ago
- Arena: Hoyvíkshøllin, Hoyvík
- President: Anna Dam
- Head coach: Mark Lausen-Marcher
- League: Burn Menn League
- Club colours
Home	Away

Hondbóltsfelagið H71 is a Faroese handball club from Hoyvík, that plays in the Burn Menn League.

Location of H71

== History ==
The club was founded, as the name indicates, in 1971. The club was promoted to the first division for the first time in 1985. In 1988, the team won a bronze medal. In 1997, the club won silver for the first time in the first division. And in 1998, the first big success happened when the team won the Faroe Islands Cup against Kyndil. The club became champions for the first time in 2009, after winning both games of the final against VÍF. The club won the league 7 times in total (in 2009, 2012, 2017, 2018, 2019, 2022 and 2023) and won the cup 7 times (in 1998, 2016, 2017, 2020, 2021, 2022 and 2023).

== Team ==
=== Current squad ===
Squad for the 2023–24 season

H71

Goalkeepers

- 1 (Faroe Islands) Torstein Sivertsen
- 12 (Faroe Islands) Jakup Johannesen
- 16 (Faroe Islands) Ingi Johannsesen

Left Wingers

- 3 (United Kingdom) Louis Daniel Christy
- 5 (Faroe Islands) Rói Seyer Hjaltason
- 20 (Faroe Islands) John Vilhelm

Right Wingers

- 9 (Faroe Islands) Jón Rói Mohr Høgnesen
- 30 (Faroe Islands) William Napoleon Djurhuus
- 71 (Faroe Islands) Bogi Hansen

Line Players

- 18 (Faroe Islands) Helgi Jacob Halldórsson
- 44 (Faroe Islands) Sakaris Aniano Sakarisson
- 47 (Faroe Islands) Ísak Jógvan Djurhuus Vedelsbøl
- 55 (Faroe Islands) Rói H. Thomsen

Left Backs

- 31 (Faroe Islands) Sveinur Olafsson
- 33 (Faroe Islands) Hilmar Leon Jakobsen
- 39 (Faroe Islands) Rókur Ziskason

Central Backs

- 15 (Faroe Islands) Haraldur Karlsson
- 17 (Faroe Islands) Helgi Poulsen
- 38 (Faroe Islands) Høgni Heinason
- 91 (Faroe Islands) Jógvan Andreas Lamhauge

Right Backs

- 8 (Faroe Islands) Silas Wang
- 11 (Faroe Islands) Hans Kári Hansen
- 22 (Faroe Islands) Andras Klein
- 23 (Faroe Islands) Høgni Højsted
- 45 (Faroe Islands) (Denmark) Peter Krogh

=== Technical staff ===
- Head coach: (Denmark) Mark Lausen-Marcher
- Assistant coach: (Faroe Islands) Djóni Gaard Joensen
- Goalkeeping coach: (Faroe Islands) Ári Egason Dam
- Physiotherapist: (Denmark) Sebastian Christensen

=== Transfers ===
Transfers for the 2023–24 season

Joining

Leaving

- (Norway) Alexandur L. Olsen (GK) to (Germany) TuS 04 Kaiserslautern-Dansenberg

== Titles ==
- Faroe Islands Handball League
  - Winner (7) : 2009, 2012, 2017, 2018, 2019, 2022, 2023
- Faroe Islands Cup
  - Winner (7) : 1998, 2016, 2017, 2020, 2021, 2022, 2023

== EHF ranking ==
As of 6/12/2023

Rank	Team	Points
162	(Israel) Hapoel Ashdod	26
163	(Germany) SC DHfK Leipzig	25
164	(Russia) SKIF Krasnodar	25
165	(Faroe Islands) H71	25
166	(Germany) HSV Hamburg	25
167	(Romania) CSM Focșani	24
168	(Estonia) Viljandi HC	24

== Former club members ==
=== Notable former players ===
- (Faroe Islands) Pauli Jacobsen (2017–2018, 2021–2022)
- (Faroe Islands) (Denmark) Peter Krogh (2017–)
- (Faroe Islands) Óli Mittún (2021–2022)
- (Faroe Islands) Elias Ellefsen á Skipagøtu (2017–2018, 2019–2020)
- (Faroe Islands) Hákun West av Teigum (2017–2018)
