= Team Klaksvík =

Faroese handball club

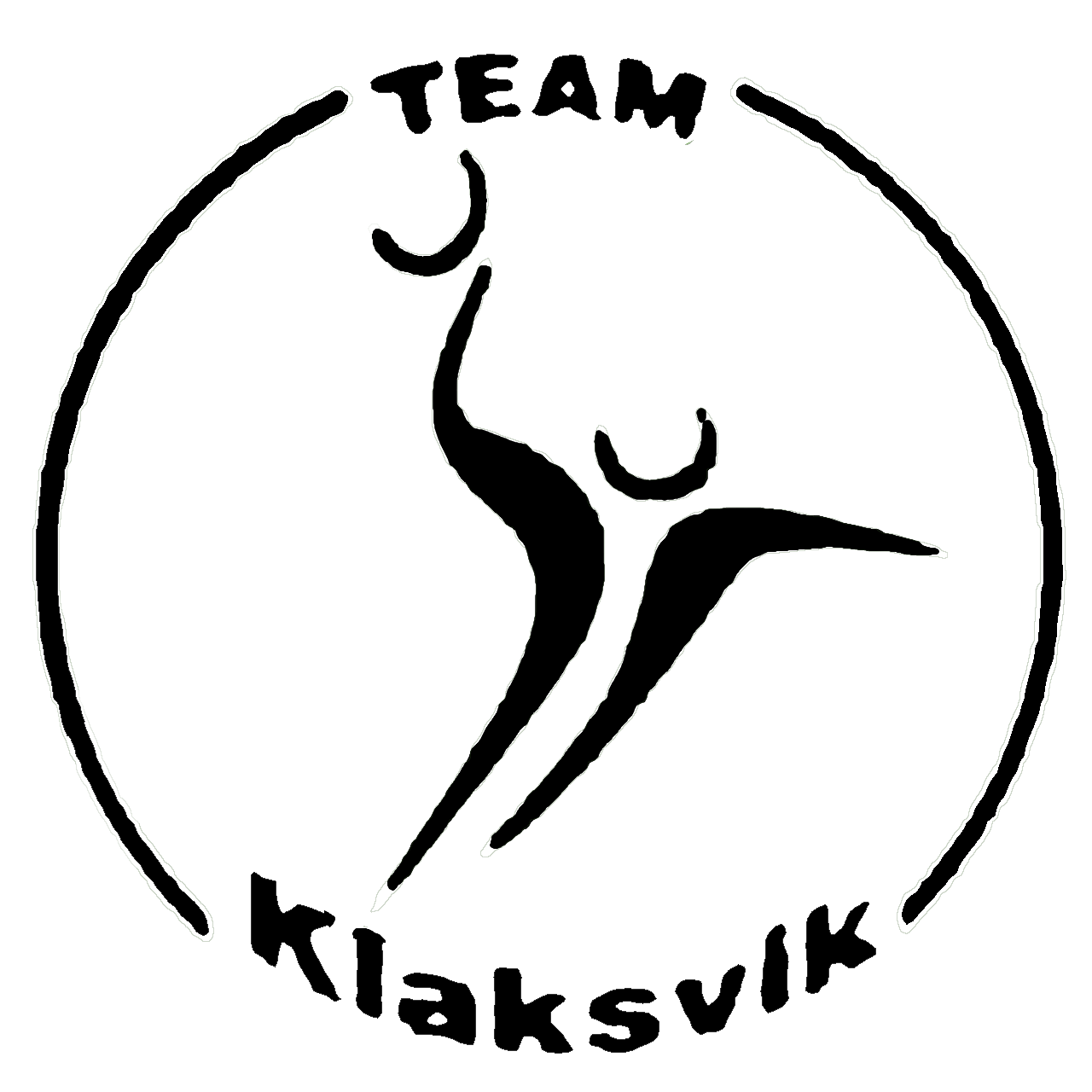
- Full name: Team Klaksvík
- Short name: Klaksvík
- Founded: 1976; 49 years ago
- Arena: Badmintonhøllin Klaksvík, Klaksvík
- President: Óli á Gravarbø
- Head coach: Finnur Hansson
- League: Burn Menn League
- Club colours
Home	Away

Team Klaksvík is a Faroese handball club from Klaksvík, that plays in the Burn Menn League.

Location of Team Klaksvík

== Crest, colours, supporters ==
=== Kit manufacturers ===
Period	Kit manufacturer
–2022	(Germany) Puma
2022–present	(Spain) Joma

=== Kits ===
HOME
2018-20	2020-22	2022–23	2023–24

AWAY
2018-20	2020-22	2022–23	2023–24

== Team ==
=== Current squad ===
Squad for the 2023–24 season

Team Klaksvík

Goalkeepers

- 1 (Faroe Islands) Björgvin Lenvig
- 49 (Croatia) David Henigman

Left Wingers

- 4 (Faroe Islands) Tummas Simonsen
- 21 (Faroe Islands) Ludvík Súnason

Right Wingers

- 11 (Faroe Islands) Suni Erlingsson Dalsgaard
- 22 (Faroe Islands) Vilhelm Vilhelmsen

Line Players

- 15 (Faroe Islands) Beinir Johannesen
- 25 (Faroe Islands) Jan Eli Ragnarsson
- 29 (Faroe Islands) Dávid Danielsen
- 40 (Faroe Islands) Dánjal Kjaerbo

Left Backs

- 23 (Croatia) Juraj Fistonić
- 24 (Russia) Nikolai Bliznov
- 88 (Faroe Islands) Jens Pauli Poulsen

Central Backs

- 52 (Faroe Islands) Petur Martin Eliasen
- 63 (Faroe Islands) Brian Slyne

Right Backs

- 34 (Faroe Islands) Sámal á Tjaldrafløtti

=== Technical staff ===
- Head coach: (Faroe Islands) Finnur Hansson
- Assistant coach: (Faroe Islands) Jón Jacobsen
- Physiotherapist: (Faroe Islands) Sámal Jákup Djurhuus

=== Transfers ===
Transfers for the 2023–24 season

Joining

Leaving

== EHF ranking ==
As of 6/12/2023

Rank	Team	Points
213	(Denmark) Fredericia HK	10
214	(Croatia) RK Spacva Vinkovci	9
215	(Azerbaijan) Azeryol HC	9
216	(Faroe Islands) Team Klaksvík	9
217	(Turkey) Sakarya Büyüksehir BSK	9
218	(Faroe Islands) Hondbóltsfelagið Neistin	9
219	(Germany) TVB Stuttgart	9
