= Evgeny Semenov =

Belarusian handball player

Personal information
- Nationality: Belarusian
- Born: 16 July 1986 (age 40) Brest, Belarus
- Height: 1.96 m (6 ft 5 in)

Sport
- Sport: Handball
- Position: Right back
National team
Years	Team	Apps	(Gls)
–	Belarus	33	(67)

Evgeny Semenov (born 16 July 1986) is a former Belarusian handball player for the Belarusian national team.
