= Vestmanna ÍF (men's handball) =

Faroese handball club

- Full name: Vestmanna Ítróttarfelag
- Short name: VÍF
- Founded: 1942; 83 years ago
- Arena: Ítróttarhøllin í Vestmanna, Vestmanna
- Capacity: 200
- Head coach: Nuno Miguel Farelo
- League: Burn Menn League
- Club colours
Home	Away

Vestmanna ÍF is a Faroese handball club from Vestmanna, that plays in the Burn Menn League.

Location of VÍF

== Crest, colours, supporters ==
=== Kits ===
HOME
2022-23	2023-24

== Team ==
=== Current squad ===
Squad for the 2023–24 season

VÍF

Goalkeepers

- 1 (Faroe Islands) Leivur Joensen
- 12 (Serbia) Mladen Mjerimačka
- 16 (Faroe Islands) Brandur Silvurstein
- 38 (Faroe Islands) Bjarni Gunnarsson Jacobsen

Left Wingers

- 3 (Faroe Islands) Eyði Bjargarson
- 4 (Faroe Islands) Jóhannes Bjørgvin
- 5 (Faroe Islands) Ragnar Ingdorsson
- 8 (Faroe Islands) Sjúrður Olsen

Right Wingers

- 18 (Faroe Islands) Brandur Martinsson Hansen

Line Players

- 7 (Faroe Islands) Jón Müller
- 11 (Faroe Islands) Djóni Bárðarson Nielsen
- 17 (Faroe Islands) Kristian Jensen

Left Backs

- 21 (Faroe Islands) (Bosnia and Herzegovina) Filip Jojic
- 34 (Faroe Islands) Magnus Müller

Central Backs

- 2 (Faroe Islands) Tróndur Johnson
- 9 (Faroe Islands) Martin Nielsen
- 14 (Faroe Islands) Kristoffur Bjørgvin
- 20 (Faroe Islands) Hanus Christophersen
- 27 (Faroe Islands) Fríði Holm Í Innistovu

Right Backs

- 10 (Faroe Islands) Andrias Eriksen
- 22 (Faroe Islands) Óla Jákup Gaard Olsen
- 24 (Faroe Islands) Hallur Arason

=== Technical staff ===
- Head coach: (Portugal) Nuno Miguel Farelo

=== Transfers ===
Transfers for the 2023–24 season

Joining

Leaving

== Titles ==
- Faroe Islands Handball League
  - Winner (24) : 1948, 1950, 1951, 1952, 1954, 1957, 1968, 1975, 1980, 1982, 1983, 1985, 1986, 1987, 1993, 1995, 1997, 1998, 2001, 2002, 2005, 2015, 2016, 2021
- Faroe Islands Cup
  - Winner (7) : 1985, 1988, 1989, 1993, 1997, 1999, 2015
- Faroe Islands Super Cup
  - Winner (1) : 2023

== EHF ranking ==
As of 6/12/2023

Rank	Team	Points
156	(Poland) MMTS Kwidzyn	29
157	(Italy) Pallamano Conversano	28
158	(Finland) IFK Helsinki	27
159	(Faroe Islands) VÍF	26
160	(Croatia) MRK Trogir	26
161	(Bosnia and Herzegovina) RK Leotar	26
162	(Israel) Hapoel Ashdod	26
