= Faroese Women's Handball League =

Faroese sports league

SMS Deildin
- Founded: 1943
- No. of teams: 8
- Country: Faroe Islands
- Confederation: EHF
- Most recent champions: Kyndil (5th title) (2023-24)
- Most titles: Neistin (41 titles)
- International cups: EHF European League; EHF European Cup

SMS Deildin is the highest league in the league system of women's handball on the Faroe Islands. The first season began in 1943–44 and the league is regulated by Handball Federation of the Faroe Islands (Hondbóltssamband Føroya) (HSF). The league consist of eight teams as of 2025.

The current champions as of the 2023-24 season is Kyndil, claiming their fifth title.

== Official names ==
=== Official League sponsorships throughout the years ===
- 1943–2004: 1. deild kvinnur
- 2005–2012: Sunset-kappingin
- 2013–2014: Elektron kappingin
- 2014–2018: hvonn kappingin
- 2018– : SMS kappingi

== Current teams ==
=== Teams for season 2024–25 ===
Team	Location as shown on map
VÍF	Vestmanna
H71	Hoyvík
Kyndil Tórshavn	Tórshavn
Hondbóltsfelagið Neistin	Tórshavn
Stjørnan Hondbóltsfelagið	Klaksvík
VB	Vágur
Stranda ÍF	Strendur
EB	Eiði

== Past champions ==
- 1943 : Hondbóltsfelagið Neistin
- 1944 : Vípan Klaksvík
- 1945 : Stjørnan
- 1946 : Hondbóltsfelagið Neistin (2)
- 1947 : EB
- 1948 : Hondbóltsfelagið Neistin (3)
- 1949 : Vípan Klaksvík (2)
- 1950 : VB
- 1951 : VÍF
- 1952 : Hondbóltsfelagið Neistin (4)
- 1953 : Hondbóltsfelagið Neistin (5)
- 1954 : Hondbóltsfelagið Neistin (6)
- 1955 : Hondbóltsfelagið Neistin (7)
- 1956 : Hondbóltsfelagið Neistin (8)
- 1957 : Hondbóltsfelagið Neistin (9)
- 1958 : Stjørnan (2)
- 1959 : Hondbóltsfelagið Neistin (10)
- 1960 : SÍF/Søljan
- 1961 : SÍF/Søljan (2)
- 1962 : SÍF/Søljan (3)
- 1963 : VÍF (2)
- 1964 : Kyndil Tórshavn
- 1965 : SÍF/Søljan (4)
- 1966 : Hondbóltsfelagið Neistin (11)
- 1967 : Hondbóltsfelagið Neistin (12)
- 1968 : VÍF (3)
- 1969 : Hondbóltsfelagið Neistin (13)
- 1970 : Hondbóltsfelagið Neistin (14)
- 1971 : Hondbóltsfelagið Neistin (15)
- 1972 : Hondbóltsfelagið Neistin (16)
- 1973 : Hondbóltsfelagið Neistin (17)
- 1974 : Hondbóltsfelagið Neistin (18)
- 1975 : Kyndil Tórshavn (2)
- 1976 : Hondbóltsfelagið Neistin (19)
- 1977 : Stjørnan (3)
- 1978 : Hondbóltsfelagið Neistin (20)
- 1979 : Hondbóltsfelagið Neistin (21)
- 1980 : Hondbóltsfelagið Neistin (22)
- 1981 : Kyndil Tórshavn (3)
- 1982 : Hondbóltsfelagið Neistin (23)
- 1983 : Hondbóltsfelagið Neistin (24)
- 1984 : Hondbóltsfelagið Neistin (25)
- 1985 : Hondbóltsfelagið Neistin (26)
- 1986 : Hondbóltsfelagið Neistin (27)
- 1987 : Hondbóltsfelagið Neistin (28)
- 1988 : Hondbóltsfelagið Neistin (29)
- 1989 : Hondbóltsfelagið Neistin (30)
- 1990 : Hondbóltsfelagið Neistin (31)
- 1991 : Skála ÍF
- 1992 : Hondbóltsfelagið Neistin (32)
- 1993 : Skála ÍF (2)
- 1994 : Hondbóltsfelagið Neistin (33)
- 1995 : Hondbóltsfelagið Neistin (34)
- 1996 : Hondbóltsfelagið Neistin (35)
- 1997 : Hondbóltsfelagið Neistin (36)
- 1998 : Kyndil Tórshavn (4)
- 1999 : Kyndil Tórshavn (5)
- 2000 : Stjørnan (4)
- 2001 : VÍF (4)
- 2002 : VÍF (5)
- 2003 : VB (2)
- 2004 : Stjørnan (5)
- 2005 : VB (3)
- 2006 : Stjørnan (6)
- 2007 : Stjørnan (7)
- 2008 : Stjørnan (8)
- 2009 : Hondbóltsfelagið Tjaldur
- 2010 : Stjørnan (9)
- 2011 : Hondbóltsfelagið Neistin (37)
- 2012 : Hondbóltsfelagið Neistin (38)
- 2013 : Hondbóltsfelagið Neistin (39)
- 2014 : Kyndil Tórshavn (6)
- 2015 : Hondbóltsfelagið Neistin (40)
- 2016 : Hondbóltsfelagið Neistin (41)
- 2017 : Kyndil Tórshavn (7)
- 2018 : VÍF (6)
- 2019 : Kyndil Tórshavn (8)
- 2020 : not awarded
- 2021 : Stranda ÍF
- 2022 : H71
- 2023 : H71 (2)
- 2024 : Kyndil Tórshavn (9)

Numbers of titles won by each club
	Club	Numbers of titles	Years
1.	Neistin	41	1943, 1946, 1948, 1952, 1953, 1954, 1955, 1956, 1957, 1959, 1966, 1967, 1969, 1970, 1971, 1972, 1973, 1974, 1976, 1978, 1979, 1980, 1982, 1983, 1984, 1985, 1986, 1987, 1988, 1989, 1990, 1992, 1994, 1995, 1996, 1997, 2011, 2012, 2013, 2015, 2016
2.	Stjørnan	9	1945, 1958, 1977, 2000, 2004, 2006, 2007, 2008, 2010
2.	Kyndil Tórshavn	9	1964, 1975, 1981, 1998, 1999, 2014, 2017, 2019, 2024
4.	VÍF	6	1951, 1963, 1968, 2001, 2002, 2018
5.	SÍF/Søljan	4	1960, 1961, 1962, 1965
6.	VB	3	1950, 2003, 2005
7.	Skála IF	2	1991, 1993
7.	Vípan Klaksvík	2	1944, 1949
7.	H71	2	2022, 2023
10.	Hondbóltsfelagið Tjaldur	1	2010
10.	EB	1	1947
10.	Stranda ÍF	1	2021
