= Huddinge HK =

Swedish handball club

- Full name: Huddinge handbollsklubb
- Short name: HHK
- Founded: 1971; 54 years ago
- Arena: Huddingehallen
- Club colours
| Home | Away |

Huddinge HK is a handball club in Huddinge in Sweden, established 27 March 1971. The women's team has played in the Swedish top division.

Location of Huddinge HK

== Kits ==
HOME

2020–
