= Kyndil =

Faroese handball club

- Full name: Kyndil
- Short name: Kyndil
- Founded: March 10, 1956
- President: (Faroe Islands) Eli Thorsteinsson
- League: Burn Menn League; SMS Deildin
- 2023–24: 2nd 1st
- Club colours
Home	Away

Kyndil is a Faroese professional men's handball club in Tórshavn, which was founded on 10 March 1956.

Kyndil has team in the best divisions for both men and women, the club has also children's teams for boys and girls. The men's team of Kyndil has won the Faroese Championships 30 times in the Atlantic Airways Division (The best Faroese handball division for men), which makes it the club with the most national championship titles for men in Europe except for the Czech club Dukla Praha, which won its national championship 31 times. The women's team have won the Farose championships 8 times in the Electron-division (the best Faroese handball division for women).

== Women's team ==
=== Current squad ===
Squad for the 2024–25 season

Kyndil

Goalkeepers

- 12 (Serbia) Jovana Stranjanac
- 16 (Faroe Islands) Gylta Djurhuus á Neystabø

Left Wingers

- 3 (Faroe Islands) Asta Sofía Finsdóttir Hansen
- 19 (Faroe Islands) Barbara Hammer
- 29 (Faroe Islands) Poula Fríðheim Petersen

Right Wingers

- 8 (Faroe Islands) Mira Bendix Laursen
- 17 (Faroe Islands) Joan Rúnadóttir Johannesen

Line Players

- 7 (Faroe Islands) Bjarta Osberg Johansen
- 14 (Faroe Islands) Marjun Jansdóttir

Left Backs

- 6 (Faroe Islands) Hanna Jakobsdóttir Dalsgarð
- 21 (Faroe Islands) Brá Reginsdóttir
- 27 (Montenegro) Nadja Pejovic
- 33 (Faroe Islands) Turið Arge Samuelsen

Central Backs

- 4 (Faroe Islands) Bára Krossteig Hansen
- 1 (Faroe Islands) Katrin Hansen
- 9 (Faroe Islands) Ró Reginsdóttir

Right Backs

- 5 (Faroe Islands) Inga Maria Roysdóttir

=== Titles ===
- Faroe Islands Handball League
  - Winner (9) : 1964, 1975, 1981, 1998, 1999, 2014, 2017, 2019, 2024
- Faroe Islands Cup
  - Winner (6) : 2000, 2014, 2017, 2019, 2022, 2024

== List of Kyndil Players with at least 100 Matches, Men and Women - Until 2005 ==
Name	Matches	Goals
Niels Torkil Nattestad	665	2168
Sverri Jacobsen	639	3048
Johannes M. Jacobsen	578	1370
Heðin Mikkelsen	534	878
Jørleif Kúrberg	533	114
Jóan Pætur Midjord	518	1962
Halgerð Midjord	501	423
Annsy Høghamar	465	667
Jóannes Dalsgarð	433	637
Kári Nielsen	426	1064
Guðrun Dalsgarð	419	243
Marjun á Plógv	418	10
Herborg Joensen	415	1117
Jónleif Sólsker	406	1745
Tórbjørn Mikkelsen	398	884
Bent Jákup Hansen	355	1095
Petur Sigurd Rasmussen	348	1035
Birgir Hansen	342	908
Áki Davidsen	318	764
Finnur Helmsdal	306	879
Hendrik Rubeksen	305	507
Hannis Wardum	298	1668
Finn Bærentsen	297	54
Hans Andreas (Dia) Midjord	294	723
Annfinn Brekkstein	281	484
Birgir Sondum	276	985
Hanus Joensen	269	1314
Sophus Dal-Christiansen	264	750
Hilmar Joensen	263	505
Vagnar Olsen	263	491
Finn Danberg	253	784
Leivur Holm	253	664
John Egholm	247	707
Regin Jakobsen	246	15
Ann Hansen	244	770
Anfinn Rubek Nielsen	242	685
Margit Frisdahl	242	511
Hans Áki Dal-Christiansen	241	846
Súsanna (Ussa) Hansen	237	494
Anya Midjord	234	345
Halldis Poulsen	228	240
Jón Helgi Hofgaard	210	19
Bárður Johannessen	201	885
Kári Danielsen	193	7
Rói Mikkelsen	190	310
Hanna Rubeksen	188	1
Elsubet Sanna á Krákusteini	186	265
Jensia Petersen	185	203
Andreas F. Hansen	182	778
Lotte Korup Sørensen	181	1213
Óluva Dalsgarð	177	802
Høgni Vilhelmsen	172	33
Gunnar Oluf Weihe	171	382
Viggo í Stórustovu	168	33
Janus Einar Sørensen	167	417
Høgni Klein	166	692
Kaj Leo Johannesen	163	625
Jendis Gærdbo	162	160
Conny Poulsen	160	281
Ken Zachariasen	160	560
Andrea (Tulla) Arge	157	677
Bárður Mikkelsen	155	378
Rúni Poulsen	155	393
Hendrik Dahl	155	159
Vema Jacobsen	154	32
Torgerð Joensen	153	68
Jóan Pauli Johansen	149	43
Ann Mari Wang	149	391
Petur M. Petersen	148	746
Bergur Hansen	146	268
Helgi á Fløtti	145	142
Jórun Ludvig	142	501
jógvan A. Joensen	140	166
Beinta Sørensen	134	595
Jógvan Asbjørn Skaale	134	213
Hans á Lag	133	27
Hanus Kúrberg	133	372
Elin Danielsen	133	0
Bjarni Wardum	132	621
Regin Johannessen	131	313
Petur Hans Poulsen	131	167
Katrin á Mýruni	131	336
Jens Mohr Askham	130	274
Vilhálmur Gregoriussen	130	136
Rannvá Christiansen	130	1
Olga Frederiksen	129	449
Marjun Andreasen	128	295
Napoleon Jacobsen	127	49
Svend Emil Andreasen	127	172
Kári Rubek Nielsen	126	352
Jakob Jónsson	126	631
Suni Jacobsen	125	262
Sólvá Sørensen	124	441
Herborg L. Joensen	121	136
Niklas Djurhuus	121	185
Rói Arting	120	220
Nikolai Mohr Balle	120	343
Randi Kúrberg	120	94
Geir Wardum	117	552
Gunnar Wardum	117	160
Regin Mikkelsen	113	271
Ragnar Simonsen	113	308
Vivian Wraae	113	98
Tina Danielsen	113	95
Jakku Heinesen	111	75
Hartvig Joensen	110	234
Búi Holm	110	222
Regin M. Petersen	109	274
Hildur Høghamar Mikkelsen	109	153
Niels Pauli Jacobsen	109	196
Erlendur Johannessen	109	2
Regin Johansen	108	360
Rakul N. Joensen	107	270
Brynhild Klein	107	326
Fríða Petersen	107	3
Uni Arge	105	693
Andre Wraae	105	245
Petur Simonsen	103	276
Uni Wardum	101	303
Jóhan Danielsen	101	1
Bodil Wardum	100	195

== The board ==
The board of Kyndil since 8 June 2016:

- Eli Thorsteinsson, chairman
- Maibritt Johannesen
- Ussa K. Hansen
- Eyðfinn Guttesen
- Salua Manai
- Kristoffur Kristoffersen
- Eyðun Mortensen
