= Neistin =

Faroese handball club

Hondbóltsfelagið Neistin
- Full name: Hondbóltsfelagið Neistin
- Short name: Neistin
- Founded: 1931; 94 years ago
- Arena: Høllin á Hálsi, Tórshavn
- Capacity: 2,000
- Head coach: Dejan Nedic
- League: Burn Menn League; SMS Deildin
- Club colours

Hondbóltsfelagið Neistin is a Faroese handball club from Tórshavn, having the men's team competing in the Burn Menn League and the women's team in the SMS Deildin.

Location of Neistin

== Sports Hall information ==
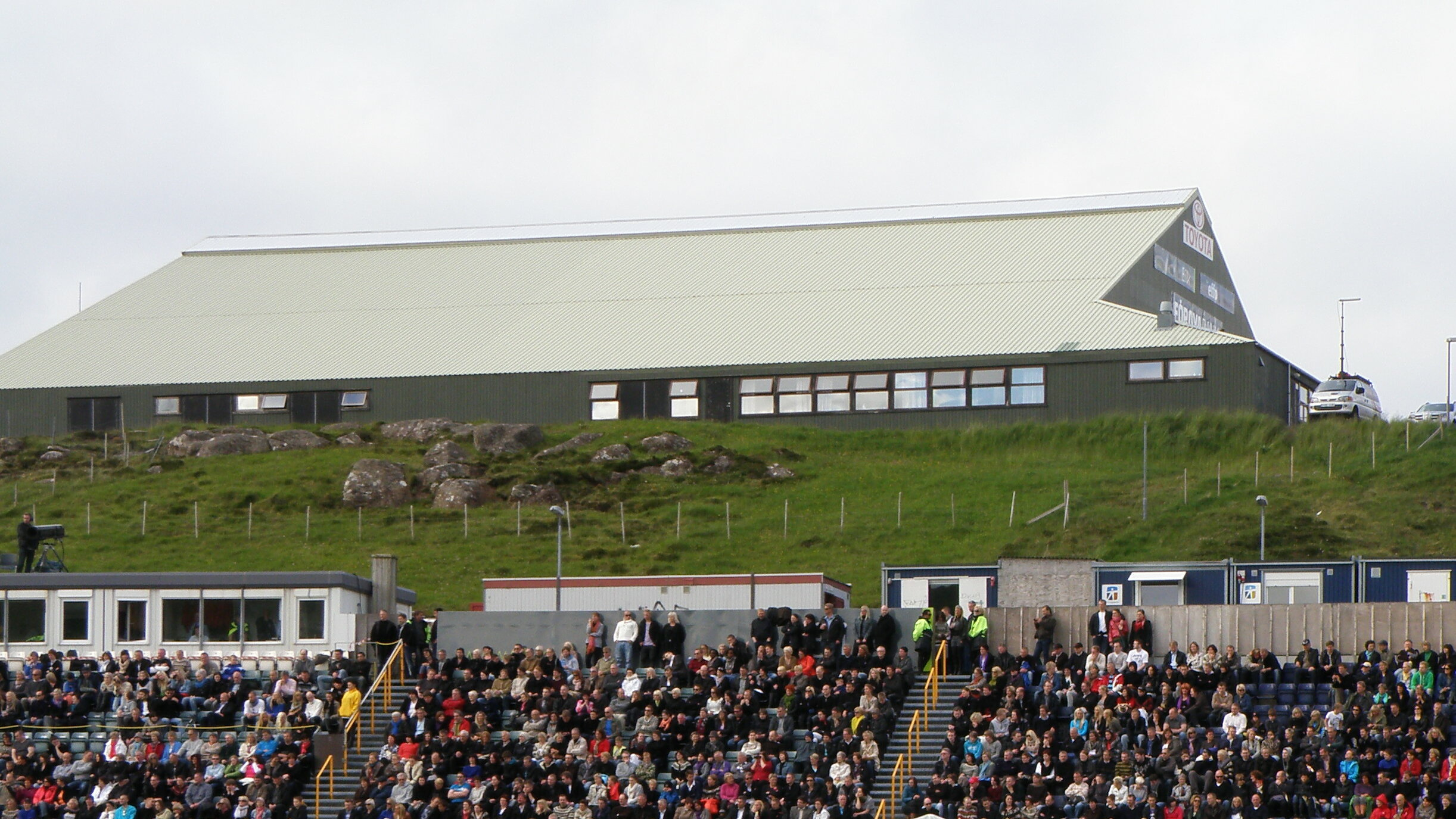
Home hall: Høllin á Hálsi

- Name: – Høllin á Hálsi
- City: – Tórshavn
- Capacity: – 2000
- Address: – Hallarvegur 4, 100 Tórshavn, Faroe Islands

== Men's team ==
=== Current squad ===
Squad for the 2023–24 season

Neistin

Goalkeepers

- 1 (Faroe Islands) Bergur Leifsson Durhuus
- 12 (Faroe Islands) Rókur Holm Joensen
- 22 (Faroe Islands) Aleksandar Lacok

Left Wingers

- 5 (Faroe Islands) Ári Arnason
- 21 (Faroe Islands) Pauli Høj
- 99 (Faroe Islands) Jón Joensen

Right Wingers

- 7 (Faroe Islands) Hanus Árason
- 19 (Faroe Islands) Rókur Árason
- 27 (Faroe Islands) Torstein Balle

Line Players

- 11 (Faroe Islands) Herbjørn Lava
- 14 (Faroe Islands) Bjartur Hansen
- 26 (Faroe Islands) Marius Berg Johansen
- 74 (Faroe Islands) Brian Eyðfinnsson

Left Backs

- 2 (Faroe Islands) Hóri Reginsson
- 4 (Faroe Islands) Hørður Lognberg
- 9 (Sweden) Erik Karlsson
- 10 (Faroe Islands) Fridi Mørk Hentze
- 23 (Faroe Islands) David Mortensen Mørk
- 29 (Faroe Islands) Johannes Pólsson Kragesteen

Central Backs

- 3 (Faroe Islands) Teitur Magnusson
- 17 (Faroe Islands) Trondur Kragesteen
- 78 (Faroe Islands) Rói Haldansen

Right Backs

- 6 (Faroe Islands) Rói Jacobsen
- 20 (Faroe Islands) Philip Harper Müller
- 88 (Denmark) Simon Karsten Højmark Pedersen

=== Technical staff ===
- Head coach: (Sweden) Dejan Nedic
- Assistant coach: (Serbia) Dejan Lacok
- Physiotherapist: (Faroe Islands) Durita Rouch

=== Transfers ===
Transfers for the 2023–24 season

Joining

Leaving

=== Titles ===
- Faroe Islands Handball League
  - Winner (8) : 1949, 1953, 1955, 1978, 2000, 2008, 2010, 2011
- Faroe Islands Cup
  - Winner (7) : 1992, 1994, 2009, 2010, 2011, 2012, 2019

== Women's team ==
=== Current squad ===
Squad for the 2024–25 season

Neistin

Goalkeepers

- 1 (Faroe Islands) Erla Eliasen
- 22 (Japan) Yui Shibuya

Left Wingers

- 3 (Faroe Islands) Birna Eyðunardóttir
- 4 (Faroe Islands) Hervør Niclasen
- 19 (Faroe Islands) Helena Dahl Magnusardóttir

Right Wingers

- 11 (Faroe Islands) Tóra Leo Mortansdóttir

Line Players

- 13 (Faroe Islands) Brynja Høj

Left Backs

- 2 (Faroe Islands) Anna Sigrunardóttir Mikkelsen

Central Backs

- 5 (Faroe Islands) Silja Olivia Heðinsdóttir
- 6 (Faroe Islands) Birita Ingolfsdóttir Jacobsen
- 9 (Faroe Islands) Ró Reginsdóttir
- 10 (Faroe Islands) Marjun Falkvard Danberg
- 15 (Faroe Islands) Bára Eliasen
- 42 (Faroe Islands) Ai Waagstein

Right Backs

- 7 (Faroe Islands) Eir Martinsdóttir Berg

=== Titles ===
- Faroe Islands Handball League
  - Winner (41) : 1943, 1946, 1948, 1952, 1953, 1954, 1955, 1956, 1957, 1959, 1966, 1967, 1969, 1970, 1971, 1972, 1973, 1974, 1976, 1978, 1979, 1980, 1982, 1983, 1984, 1985, 1986, 1987, 1988, 1989, 1990, 1992, 1994, 1995, 1996, 1997, 2011, 2012, 2013, 2015, 2016
- Faroe Islands Cup
  - Winner (14) : 1987, 1988, 1989, 1990, 1992, 1994, 1995, 1996, 1997, 1998, 2006, 2013, 2015, 2016

== EHF ranking ==
As of 6/12/2023

Rank	Team	Points
215	(Azerbaijan) Azeryol HC	9
216	(Faroe Islands) Team Klaksvík	9
217	(Turkey) Sakarya Büyüksehir BSK	9
218	(Faroe Islands) Neistin	9
219	(Germany) TVB Stuttgart	9
220	(Finland) Dicken	9
221	(Denmark) Ribe-Esbjerg HH	9
