= Montenegrin Handball League Records =

The Montenegrin First League of Men's Handball (in montenegrin Prva Muška Liga) is the top men's team handball league in Montenegro. It is organized by the Handball Federation of Montenegro. In the league participate eight clubs.

The League was established after the Montenegrin independence, with first season started in October 2006.

== Competition format ==
From its establishing, First Montenegrin Handball League regularly consists of eight teams. During the few seasons, in the competition played seven clubs, because the financial or the other problems of some First League members.

League regularly have two parts. During the first part, there is 16 (or 14) weeks. After that, during the second part, four best-placed clubs are playing playoff (TOP4) league for champion, and the others are playing play-out (relegating) league.

At the end of the season, the bottom-placed club is relegating. Every season, champion of the Montenegrin Second League is promoted as a new member of the First League.

Below is a complete record of how many teams played in each season throughout the league's history.

- 8 clubs: Montenegrin First League 2006/07
- 7 clubs: Montenegrin First League 2007/08
- 8 clubs: Montenegrin First League 2008/09
- 8 clubs: Montenegrin First League 2009/10
- 7 clubs: Montenegrin First League 2010/11
- 8 clubs: Montenegrin First League 2011/12
- 7 clubs: Montenegrin First League 2012/13
- 7 clubs: Montenegrin First League 2013/14
- 7 clubs: Montenegrin First League 2014/15

== Participants ==
Location of the teams which played in the Montenegrin First League

Since its establishing, in the Montenegrin First League participated 13 different clubs - RK Lovćen Cetinje, RK Sutjeska Nikšić, RK Berane, RK Mojkovac, RK Mornar Bar, RK Budvanska rivijera Budva, RK Rudar Pljevlja, RK Budućnost Podgorica, RK Boka Tivat, RK Danilovgrad, RK Ulcinj, RK Cepelin Cetinje and RK Sedmerac Bar.

During the history of competition, only two towns had more than one First League club - Cetinje and Bar.

=== Previous First League Seasons ===
Most of the clubs, during the past, were playing in the SFR Yugoslavia or FR Yugoslavia/Serbia and Montenegro First League - that was RK Lovćen (2 titles of FRY champion and SCG Cup winner), RK Rudar (former Pljevlja), RK Berane (former Raj banka), RK Mornar (former FRY Cup finalist), RK Budućnost and RK Mojkovac (former Brskovo).

Below is a list of Montenegrin clubs which competed in the SFRY, FRY/SCG First League.

- **15** seasons: **RK Lovćen Cetinje** (champions: 2000, 2001; cup winners: 2002, 2003)
- **8** seasons: **RK Rudar Pljevlja**, **RK Mornar Bar**, **RK Berane**
- **3** seasons: **RK Budućnost Podgorica**
- **1** season: **RK Mojkovac**

=== Performances by clubs ===
Below is a list of First League clubs who have competed in the competition, including the season 2014/15. The teams in bold compete in First League currently. RK Lovćen is the only team that played First League in every season.

- **9** seasons: **RK Lovćen Cetinje**
- **8** seasons: RK Sutjeska Nikšić, **RK Berane**, **RK Mojkovac**
- **7** seasons: **RK Budvanska rivijera Budva**
- **6** seasons: RK Mornar Bar, **RK Rudar Pljevlja**
- **4** seasons: **RK Partizan Tivat**
- **3** seasons: RK Budućnost Podgorica, **RK Ulcinj**
- **2** seasons: RK Danilovgrad, RK Cepelin Cetinje
- **1** season: RK Sedmerac Bar

=== Performances by season ===
Club	Participations	Seasons
RK Lovćen Cetinje	9	**2007**, 2008, 2009, 2010, 2011, **2012**, **2013**, **2014**, 2015
RK Sutjeska Nikšić	8	2007, 2008, 2009, 2010, 2011, 2012, 2013, 2014
RK Berane	8	2007, **2008**, 2009, 2010, 2011, 2012, 2013, 2015
RK Mojkovac	8	2007, 2008, 2009, **2011**, 2012, 2013, 2014, 2015
RK Budvanska rivijera Budva	7	2009, 2010, 2011, 2012, 2013, 2014, 2015
RK Mornar Bar	6	2007, 2008, 2009, 2010, 2011, 2013
RK Rudar Pljevlja	6	2007, 2009, 2010, 2011, 2012, 2015
RK Partizan Tivat	4	2007, 2008, 2014, 2015
RK Budućnost Podgorica	3	2008, **2009**, **2010**
RK Ulcinj	3	2013, 2014, 2015
RK Danilovgrad	2	2010, 2014
RK Cepelin Cetinje	2	2007, 2012
RK Sedmerac Bar	1	2012

== List of Champions (2007 - ) ==
=== By season ===
First champion of Montenegro, in the season 2006/07, became RK Lovćen Cetinje. In the next seasons, another three clubs won the trophy (RK Berane, RK Budućnost Podgorica, RK Mojkovac) and Budućnost became first club which won two titles in the row.

In the season 2009/10, Budućnost became the first club to finish a season without losing a point, a feat repeated by Lovćen during the season 2012/13.

Season	Champions	Runners-up	Third	Fourth
2006–07	RK Lovćen Cetinje	RK Berane	RK Sutjeska Nikšić	RK Mornar Bar
2007–08	RK Berane	RK Lovćen Cetinje	RK Sutjeska Nikšić	RK Mornar Bar
2008–09	RK Budućnost Podgorica	RK Lovćen Cetinje	RK Sutjeska Nikšić	RK Berane
2009–10	RK Budućnost Podgorica	RK Sutjeska Nikšić	RK Lovćen Cetinje	RK Rudar Pljevlja
2010–11	RK Mojkovac	RK Lovćen Cetinje	RK Sutjeska Nikšić	RK Budvanska rivijera
2011–12	RK Lovćen Cetinje	RK Mojkovac	RK Sutjeska Nikšić	RK Budvanska rivijera
2012–13	RK Lovćen Cetinje	RK Mojkovac	RK Budvanska rivijera	RK Sutjeska Nikšić
2013–14	RK Lovćen Cetinje	RK Budvanska rivijera	RK Boka Tivat	RK Sutjeska Nikšić

=== By team ===
Since 2006, four different clubs won the trophy of Montenegrin handball champion.
Most successful were RK Lovćen Cetinje with 4 titles and now dissolved RK Budućnost Podgorica (2 trophies). With 2 titles from FR Yugoslavia Championship (2000, 2001), two trophies of FRY Cup Winner (2002, 2003) and 5 wins in Montenegrin Cup, RK Lovćen is the most successful participant of Montenegrin First League.
Clubs which have one champions trophy are RK Mojkovac and RK Berane.

Club	Titles	Years won	Runner-up
RK Lovćen Cetinje	4	2007, 2012, 2013, 2014	2008, 2009, 2011
RK Budućnost Podgorica	2	2009, 2010	
RK Berane	1	2008	2007
RK Mojkovac	1	2011	2012, 2013
RK Sutjeska Nikšić	0		2009
RK Budvanska rivijera Budva	0		2014

== European Competitions ==
Due to EHF ranking list and places distribution, at the season 2014/15. in the European Cups will participate two Montenegrin clubs (1 in EHF Cup, 1 in EHF Challenge Cup).

The greatest performance of one Montenegrin club in the European competitions was noted during the EHF Champions League 2000/01, when RK Lovćen finished at the fifth place.

== All-time Montenegrin First League table ==
The All-time Montenegrin First League table is a ranking of all Montenegrin handball clubs based on their performance in the Montenegrin First League, the top division of Montenegrin handball. In this ranking 2 points are awarded for a win, 1 for a draw, and 0 for a loss.

Highlighted clubs played in the First League in the 2013/14 season.

Table is not including the results from the actual season (2014/15).

Rank	Club	Seasons^{a}	Games	W	D	L	Pts	Current league
1	RK Lovćen Cetinje	8	160	131	7	22	269	1. League
2	RK Sutjeska Nikšić	8	160	81	11	68	173	lower rank
3	RK Mojkovac	7	136	64	11	61	137	1. League
4	RK Berane	7	136	59	11	66	129	1. League
5	RK Budvanska rivijera Budva	6	120	56	10	54	122	1. League
6	RK Budućnost Podgorica	3	64	52	1	11	105	dissolved
7	RK Mornar Bar	6	112	34	8	70	76	2. League
8	RK Rudar Pljevlja	5	104	35	5	64	75	1. League
9	RK Partizan Tivat	3	54	14	3	37	31	1. League
10	RK Ulcinj	2	32	11	3	18	25	1. League
11	RK Cepelin Cetinje	2	34	5	2	27	12	lower rank
12	RK Sedmerac Bar	1	18	4	1	13	9	lower rank
13	RK Danilovgrad	2	36	3	0	33	6	2. League

^aSeasons not including current season (2014/15)

== Placement by season ==
Below is the list of participants of the First League with their placements during the every single season.

Club	07	08	09	10	11	12	13	14
RK Berane	2	1	4	7	6	8	7	-
RK Partizan	7	7	-	-	-	-	-	3
RK Budućnost	-	5	1	1	-	-	-	-
RK Budvanska rivijera	-	-	5	6	5	4	3	2
RK Cepelin	8	-	-	-	-	7	-	-
RK Danilovgrad	-	-	-	8	-	-	-	7
RK Lovćen	1	2	2	3	2	1	1	1
RK Mojkovac	5	6	6	-	1	2	2	5
RK Mornar	4	4	8	7	7	-	6	-
RK Rudar	6	-	7	4	5	5	-	-
RK Sedmerac	-	-	-	-	-	6	-	-
RK Sutjeska	3	3	3	2	3	3	4	4
RK Ulcinj	-	-	-	-	-	-	5	6

== See also ==
- Montenegrin First League of Men's Handball
- Montenegrin handball clubs in European competitions
- Montenegrin Second League of Men's Handball
- Montenegrin Men's Handball Cup
- Montenegrin First League of Women's Handball
