= RK Lovćen in the First League =

Montenegrin handball club

During their history, RK Lovćen Cetinje played almost 25 seasons in the First Handball League of SFR Yugoslavia, FR Yugoslavia and Montenegro. Five times, club from Cetinje won the champions' title - in the seasons 1999–00, 2000–01, 2006–07, 2011–12 and 2012–13.

First season of Lovćen in the First League was 1988–89. First match in First league of SFR Yugoslavia, Lovćen played in October 1988 against RK Jugović away and won with result 23:20.

== Summary ==
Below is the list of placements of RK Lovćen during the seasons in the First League of SFR Yugoslavia, FR Yugoslavia and Montenegro.

- (Socialist Federal Republic of Yugoslavia) 1988–89 - 6th place
- (Socialist Federal Republic of Yugoslavia) 1989–90 - 11th place
- (Socialist Federal Republic of Yugoslavia) 1990–91 - 15th place
- (Federal Republic of Yugoslavia) 1994–95 - 7th place
- (Federal Republic of Yugoslavia) 1995–96 - 12th place
- (Federal Republic of Yugoslavia) 1996–97 - 2nd place
- (Federal Republic of Yugoslavia) 1997–98 - 3rd place
- (Federal Republic of Yugoslavia) 1998–99 - 2nd place
- (Federal Republic of Yugoslavia) 1999–00 - CHAMPIONS
- (Federal Republic of Yugoslavia) 2000–01 - CHAMPIONS
- (Federal Republic of Yugoslavia) 2001–02 - 2nd place
- (Federal Republic of Yugoslavia) 2002–03 - 2nd place
- (Federal Republic of Yugoslavia) 2003–04 - 5th place
- (Federal Republic of Yugoslavia) 2004–05 - 3rd place
- (Federal Republic of Yugoslavia) 2005–06 - 6th place
- (Montenegro) 2006–07 - CHAMPIONS
- (Montenegro) 2007–08 - 2nd place
- (Montenegro) 2008–09 - 2nd place
- (Montenegro) 2009–10 - 3rd place
- (Montenegro) 2010–11 - 2nd place
- (Montenegro) 2011–12 - CHAMPIONS
- (Montenegro) 2012–13 - CHAMPIONS
- (Montenegro) 2013–14 - CHAMPIONS

== 1988–89 season ==
On their debut, club from Cetinje made good result, with 16 wins, a draw and 13 defeats, placed at the sixth place on the final table. Lovćen started at 29 October 1988 with the guest win against Jugović in Kać (23:20) and one week after, they made first home win in the First League against Zamet (22:14). That was the largest victory of Lovćen in the 1988–89 season. Largest defeat, Lovćen suffered at 23 February 1989 against Proleter in Zrenjanin (15:26).

During their debut season in the First Yugoslav League, RK Lovćen played their home matches in the Morača Sports Center at Podgorica because SRC 'Lovćen' Hall at Cetinje didn't meet the standards of the highest level.

During the 1988–89 season, Lovćen made good result in the Yugoslav Cup, too. For the first time in the history, Lovćen played at the Final Tournament. During the first stage of Cup, Lovćen made 3 wins at the Group 'A' in Ivangrad, against Pelister Bitola (24:19), Borac Banja Luka (23:21) and Vlaznimi Đakovica (31:21). At the Final Tournament, which held in Novi Sad, Lovćen was eliminated in the Cup semifinals by Medveščak Zagreb (23:30).

RK Lovćen results - First League 1988–89
| Opponent | Home | Away |
|---|---|---|
| Borac Banja Luka | 29:26 | 26:25 |
| Borac Uroševac | 31:25 | 31:28 |
| Crvena zvezda Belgrade | 23:20 | 22:23 |
| Crvenka | 29:28 | 19:23 |
| Dubočica Leskovac | 34:29 | 25:20 |
| Jugović Kać | 28:24 | 23:20 |
| Medveščak Zagreb | 24:25 | 20:22 |
| Metaloplastika Šabac | 18:17 | 16:20 |
| Pelister Bitola | 24:22 | 19:20 |
| Proleter Zrenjanin | 19:21 | 15:26 |
| Sloga Doboj | 28:28 | 16:20 |
| Kolinska Slovan Ljubljana | 21:18 | 26:22 |
| Zagreb Hromos | 24:25 | 19:22 |
| Zamet Rijeka | 22:14 | 17:18 |
| Železničar Niš | 18:16 | 22:26 |

First League 1988–89 - table
| Pos | Club | Pts | GP | W | D | L | GF | GA |
|---|---|---|---|---|---|---|---|---|
| 1 | Zagreb Hromos | 42 | 30 | 21 | 0 | 9 | 705 | 661 |
| 2 | Proleter Zrenjanin | 41 | 30 | 20 | 1 | 9 | 734 | 663 |
| 3 | Metaloplastika Šabac | 38 | 30 | 19 | 0 | 11 | 718 | 651 |
| 4 | Medveščak Zagreb | 38 | 30 | 18 | 2 | 10 | 737 | 701 |
| 5 | Crvenka | 37 | 30 | 18 | 1 | 11 | 736 | 698 |
| 6 | Lovćen Cetinje | 33 | 30 | 16 | 1 | 13 | 701 | 664 |
| 7 | Crvena zvezda Belgrade | 33 | 30 | 15 | 3 | 12 | 711 | 697 |
| 8 | Zamet Rijeka | 32 | 30 | 15 | 2 | 13 | 656 | 650 |
| 9 | Borac Banja Luka | 30 | 30 | 15 | 0 | 15 | 710 | 676 |
| 10 | Železničar Niš | 30 | 30 | 14 | 2 | 14 | 698 | 680 |
| 11 | Jugović Kać | 30 | 30 | 15 | 0 | 15 | 699 | 692 |
| 12 | Pelister Bitola | 27 | 30 | 13 | 1 | 16 | 737 | 738 |
| 13 | Kolinska Slovan Ljubljana | 26 | 30 | 12 | 2 | 16 | 696 | 702 |
| 14 | Sloga Doboj | 26 | 30 | 12 | 2 | 16 | 691 | 737 |
| 15 | Dubočica Leskovac | 24 | 30 | 7 | 0 | 23 | 649 | 774 |
| 16 | Borac Uroševac | 3 | 30 | 1 | 1 | 28 | 555 | 721 |

== 1989–90 season ==
During the 1989–90 season, Lovćen's performance was weaker than the year before. Club from Cetinje won 13 games, with one draw and 16 defeats. At the end of competition, Lovćen won 11th place. The only Montenegrin First League member made several good results against top-of-the-table teams, like wins against Crvena zvezda (19:18) and Proleter (17:16), or a draw with Zagreb Hromos (20:20).

The biggest win, Lovćen made during the sixth week, at 4 November 1989, against Kristal (31:22). Hardest defeat Lovćen suffered at 30 May 1990 against Metaloplastika in Šabac (15:30). At 2 December 1989, at the match against Zagreb Hromos away, Lovćen scored only 12 goals (12:19).

After the adaptation of SRC 'Lovćen' Hall, during this season, Lovćen started to play home matches at their town Cetinje, at the large crowd, in front of numerous spectators, with average attendance od 2,000.

RK Lovćen results - First League 1989–90
| Opponent | Home | Away |
|---|---|---|
| Borac Banja Luka | 22:26 | 15:21 |
| Crvena zvezda Belgrade | 19:18 | 18:30 |
| Crvenka | 17:16 | 25:32 |
| Jugović Kać | 25:22 | 19:29 |
| Kristal Zaječar | 31:22 | 18:21 |
| Medveščak Zagreb | 20:19 | 21:26 |
| Metaloplastika Šabac | 19:17 | 15:30 |
| Pelister Bitola | 21:20 | 20:26 |
| Proleter Zrenjanin | 17:16 | 16:21 |
| Sloga Doboj | 20:17 | 16:21 |
| Kolinska Slovan Ljubljana | 22:16 | 16:15 |
| Vrbas | 23:18 | 19:21 |
| Zagreb Hromos | 20:20 | 12:19 |
| Zamet Rijeka | 18:20 | 16:25 |
| Železničar Niš | 29:24 | 16:17 |

First League 1989–90 - table
| Pos | Club | Pts | GP | W | D | L | GF | GA |
|---|---|---|---|---|---|---|---|---|
| 1 | Borac Banja Luka | 45 | 30 | 21 | 3 | 7 | 750 | 687 |
| 2 | Zagreb Hromos | 43 | 30 | 20 | 3 | 7 | 738 | 681 |
| 3 | Proleter Zrenjanin | 42 | 30 | 21 | 0 | 9 | 729 | 669 |
| 4 | Crvena zvezda Belgrade | 41 | 30 | 20 | 1 | 9 | 710 | 630 |
| 5 | Metaloplastika Šabac | 34 | 29 | 17 | 0 | 12 | 692 | 654 |
| 6 | Jugović Kać | 34 | 30 | 16 | 2 | 12 | 771 | 736 |
| 7 | Pelister Bitola | 34 | 30 | 17 | 0 | 13 | 727 | 600 |
| 8 | Medveščak Zagreb | 29 | 30 | 14 | 1 | 15 | 780 | 648 |
| 9 | Zamet Rijeka | 29 | 30 | 14 | 1 | 15 | 630 | 642 |
| 10 | Vrbas | 27 | 30 | 13 | 1 | 16 | 729 | 753 |
| 11 | Lovćen Cetinje | 27 | 30 | 13 | 1 | 16 | 592 | 642 |
| 12 | Crvenka | 26 | 30 | 13 | 0 | 17 | 765 | 784 |
| 13 | Železničar Niš | 22 | 30 | 11 | 0 | 19 | 680 | 728 |
| 14 | Sloga Doboj | 22 | 29 | 10 | 0 | 19 | 648 | 783 |
| 15 | Kristal Zaječar | 17 | 30 | 8 | 1 | 21 | 684 | 799 |
| 16 | Kolinska Slovan Ljubljana | 9 | 30 | 4 | 1 | 25 | 653 | 742 |

== 1990–91 season ==
1990–91 Season. was the last participation of Lovćen in the SFR Yugoslavia First League. After 30 weeks of championship, club from Cetinje have poor score - 8 wins and 21 defeats. With that result, and 15th place on the final table, Lovćen was relegated to the Second League. The biggest win, Lovćen made against Budućnost (24:21) and Železničar (23:20). During the 20th week, Lovćen suffered the hardest defeat in the season, against Crvena zvezda away (19:31).

Matches between Lovćen and Budućnost (24:21, 16:19) were first two games between two Montenegrin clubs in the First Yugoslav Handball League.

RK Lovćen results - First League 1990–91
| Opponent | Home | Away |
|---|---|---|
| Borac Banja Luka | 21:19 | 25:28 |
| Budućnost Titograd | 24:21 | 16:19 |
| Crvena zvezda Belgrade | 19:20 | 19:31 |
| Crvenka | 20:18 | 27:25 |
| Istraturist Umag | 21:19 | 19:27 |
| Jugović Kać | 18:17 | 22:25 |
| Medveščak Zagreb | 28:25 | 19:23 |
| Metaloplastika Šabac | 21:23 | 16:23 |
| Pelister Bitola | 19:21 | 27:32 |
| Proleter Zrenjanin | 14:16 | 24:28 |
| Sloga Doboj | 20:17 | 19:21 |
| Vrbas | 19:25 | 22:26 |
| Zagreb Hromos | 17:21 | 25:27 |
| Zamet Rijeka | 22:21 | 14:25 |
| Železničar Niš | 23:20 | 18:28 |

First League 1990–91 - table
| Pos | Club | Pts | GP | W | D | L | GF | GA |
|---|---|---|---|---|---|---|---|---|
| 1 | Zagreb Hromos | 46 | 30 | 22 | 2 | 6 | 777 | 660 |
| 2 | Proleter Zrenjanin | 44 | 30 | 22 | 0 | 8 | 685 | 607 |
| 3 | Crvena zvezda Belgrade | 44 | 30 | 22 | 0 | 8 | 735 | 673 |
| 4 | Metaloplastika Šabac | 44 | 30 | 21 | 2 | 7 | 722 | 641 |
| 5 | Borac Banja Luka | 35 | 30 | 17 | 1 | 12 | 666 | 639 |
| 6 | Jugović Kać | 34 | 30 | 17 | 0 | 13 | 720 | 679 |
| 7 | Crvenka | 34 | 30 | 16 | 0 | 14 | 697 | 710 |
| 8 | Pelister Bitola | 32 | 30 | 14 | 2 | 14 | 662 | 670 |
| 9 | Medveščak Zagreb | 32 | 30 | 14 | 2 | 14 | 717 | 724 |
| 10 | Sloga Doboj | 32 | 30 | 14 | 2 | 14 | 652 | 670 |
| 11 | Železničar Niš | 23 | 30 | 11 | 1 | 18 | 686 | 722 |
| 12 | Zamet Rijeka | 23 | 30 | 11 | 1 | 18 | 640 | 690 |
| 13 | Istraturist Umag | 20 | 30 | 10 | 0 | 20 | 606 | 649 |
| 14 | Vrbas | 20 | 30 | 8 | 4 | 18 | 672 | 720 |
| 15 | Lovćen Cetinje | 16 | 30 | 8 | 0 | 22 | 610 | 705 |
| 16 | Budućnost Titograd | 12 | 30 | 5 | 2 | 23 | 660 | 748 |

== 1994–95 season ==
For the first time in FR Yugoslavia, Lovćen competed in the First League during the 1994–95 season. Season started with first part, in which 24 clubs were divided into four groups. From the every group of six teams, placement to the final Super League competition was provided for 3 first-placed clubs. Lovćen participated in the Group 'G' alongside Mornar, Vrbas, Vujić, Vojvodina and Stari grad. Lovćen provided placement to the Super League in the last match, with the win against Vujić (26:18).

First League 1994–95 – Part I (Group G)
| Pos | Club | Pts | GP | W | L | T |
|---|---|---|---|---|---|---|
| 1 | Vrbas | 17 | 10 | 8 | 1 | 1 |
| 2 | Mornar Bar | 14 | 10 | 6 | 2 | 1 |
| 3 | Lovćen Cetinje | 9 | 10 | 3 | 3 | 4 |
| 4 | Vujić Valjevo | 8 | 10 | 3 | 2 | 5 |
| 5 | Vojvodina Novi Sad | 7 | 10 | 2 | 3 | 5 |
| 6 | Stari Grad Belgrade | 1 | 10 | 0 | 1 | 9 |

During the Super League, Lovćen won 9 matches, with one draw and 12 defeats. During the first part of the season, Lovćen was at the bottom of the table, but after few wins in a row during the March and April 1995, club from Cetinje finished championship at seventh place. Biggest wins, Lovćen made against Železničar (31:25) and Dubočica (26:20). Hardest defeat for Lovćen came at the first match in 1995, against RK Kikinda away (20:26).

RK Lovćen results - First League 1994–95
| Opponent | Home | Away |
|---|---|---|
| Crvena zvezda Belgrade | 18:13 | 16:15 |
| Crvenka | 24:22 | 21:24 |
| Dubočica Leskovac | 26:20 | 22:23 |
| Jugović Kać | 20:17 | 21:22 |
| Kikinda | 20:16 | 20:26 |
| Mornar Bar | 18:18 | 18:20 |
| Partizan Belgrade | 13:17 | 23:26 |
| Proleter Zrenjanin | 25:20 | 21:25 |
| Sintelon Bačka Palanka | 25:20 | 14:17 |
| Vrbas | 19:20 | 21:26 |
| Železničar Niš | 31:25 | 19:21 |

First League 1994–95 - Super League
| Pos | Club | Pts | GP | W | D | L | GF | GA |
|---|---|---|---|---|---|---|---|---|
| 1 | Partizan Belgrade | 34 | 22 | 16 | 2 | 4 | 433 | 401 |
| 2 | RK Vrbas | 34 | 22 | 17 | 0 | 5 | 534 | 474 |
| 3 | Mornar Bar | 25 | 22 | 10 | 5 | 7 | 464 | 463 |
| 4 | Železničar Niš | 24 | 22 | 11 | 2 | 9 | 451 | 446 |
| 5 | Dubočica Leskovac | 21 | 22 | 10 | 1 | 11 | 468 | 461 |
| 6 | Jugović Kać | 21 | 22 | 9 | 3 | 10 | 391 | 402 |
| 7 | Lovćen Cetinje | 19 | 22 | 9 | 1 | 12 | 453 | 453 |
| 8 | Proleter Zrenjanin | 19 | 22 | 8 | 3 | 11 | 460 | 466 |
| 9 | Kikinda | 19 | 22 | 9 | 1 | 12 | 467 | 476 |
| 10 | Sintelon Bačka Palanka | 17 | 30 | 8 | 1 | 13 | 391 | 416 |
| 11 | Crvena zvezda Belgrade | 16 | 22 | 7 | 2 | 13 | 420 | 427 |
| 12 | Crvenka | 15 | 22 | 7 | 1 | 14 | 484 | 527 |

== 1995–96 season ==
1995–96 Season also had two parts. During the first, Lovćen played in one of seven groups with four teams. After four weeks of group competition, team from Cetinje succeed to qualify for the final Super League in the group with Dubočica, Stari Grad and Marek.

First League 1995–96 – Part I (Group C)
| Pos | Club | Pts | GP | W | L | T |
|---|---|---|---|---|---|---|
| 1 | Dubočica Leskovac | 10 | 6 | 5 | 0 | 1 |
| 2 | Lovćen Cetinje | 6 | 6 | 3 | 0 | 3 |
| 3 | Stari Grad Belgrade | 4 | 6 | 2 | 0 | 4 |
| 4 | Marek Kruševac | 4 | 6 | 2 | 0 | 4 |

During the Super League, Lovćen won 10 matches, with 15 defeats. At the whole season, Lovćen struggled for the survival in the First League with Dubočica and Sintelon, and succeeded at the end. Lovćen finished season at the 12th place on the table. Biggest wins, Lovćen made against Vojvodina (21:17) and Dubočica (19:15), with hardest defeat against Dubočica away (16:27). At the match against Proleter away, Lovćen scored only 12 goals (12:16). That was Lovćen's game with the fewest scored goals in their First League history, together with match against Zagreb Hromos at December 1989 (12:19).

RK Lovćen results - First League 1995–96
| Opponent | Home | Away |
|---|---|---|
| Crvena zvezda Belgrade | dnp | 24:29 |
| Crvenka | 23:27 | 28:31 |
| Dubočica Leskovac | 19:15 | 16:27 |
| Jugović Kać | 24:21 | 18:22 |
| Metaloplastika Šabac | 20:18 | 14:21 |
| Mornar Bar | 24:23 | 16:20 |
| Partizan Belgrade | 23:27 | 24:27 |
| Proleter Zrenjanin | 19:16 | 12:18 |
| Sever Subotica | 16:14 | 21:23 |
| Sintelon Bačka Palanka | 20:18 | 14:17 |
| Vojvodina Novi Sad | 21:17 | 17:22 |
| Vrbas | 24:22 | 19:27 |
| Železničar Niš | 25:24 | 15:17 |

First League 1995–96 - Super League
| Pos | Club | Pts | GP | W | D | L | GF | GA |
|---|---|---|---|---|---|---|---|---|
| 1 | Crvena zvezda Belgrade | 39 | 25 | 17 | 5 | 3 | 587 | 526 |
| 2 | Partizan Belgrade | 37 | 26 | 16 | 5 | 5 | 682 | 597 |
| 3 | Vrbas | 31 | 26 | 12 | 7 | 7 | 553 | 536 |
| 4 | Metaloplastika Šabac | 29 | 26 | 13 | 3 | 11 | 553 | 526 |
| 5 | Proleter Zrenjanin | 28 | 26 | 12 | 4 | 10 | 630 | 612 |
| 6 | Železničar Niš | 27 | 26 | 12 | 3 | 11 | 556 | 527 |
| 7 | Jugović Kać | 24 | 26 | 10 | 4 | 12 | 494 | 541 |
| 8 | Crvenka | 23 | 26 | 10 | 3 | 13 | 569 | 567 |
| 9 | Mornar Bar | 23 | 26 | 11 | 1 | 14 | 596 | 585 |
| 10 | Sever Subotica | 22 | 26 | 9 | 4 | 13 | 542 | 603 |
| 11 | Vojvodina Novi Sad | 21 | 26 | 10 | 1 | 15 | 539 | 589 |
| 12 | Lovćen Cetinje | 20 | 25 | 10 | 0 | 15 | 498 | 553 |
| 13 | Dubočica Leskovac | 20 | 25 | 9 | 2 | 15 | 511 | 570 |
| 14 | Sintelon Bačka Palanka | 19 | 25 | 8 | 3 | 15 | 504 | 551 |

== 1996–97 season ==
At the 1996–97 season, for the first time in the history, Lovćen won the second place in the First League and made their first promotion to the European competitions. Lovćen had a surprising performance, and finished the season with 16 wins, 3 draws and 7 defeats.

During the season, Lovćen made great successes. Lovćen also played 15 matches in a row without a defeat, with 12 wins and 3 draws. In their home town, Lovćen won all of the matches, including those against biggest rivals - Crvena zvezda (24:20), Partizan (21:18), Železničar (26:22) or Proleter (17:16). Biggest win Lovćen made at 25th leg against Jugović - 30:17. In the 19th leg, at the finish of the match against Metaloplastika in Šabac, Lovćen players were attacked by home team and supporters, and game is registered with 10:0 result for guest side.

Success from the 1996–97 season. was the greatest result of Lovćen until then.

RK Lovćen results - First League 1996–97
| Opponent | Home | Away |
|---|---|---|
| Crvena zvezda Belgrade | 24:20 | 21:22 |
| Crvenka | 24:15 | 21:28 |
| Dinamo Pančevo | 21:19 | 15:15 |
| Epoksid Priboj | 30:26 | 17:20 |
| Jugović Kać | 30:17 | 16:16 |
| Metaloplastika Šabac | 24:18 | 10:0 |
| Mornar Bar | 27:24 | 23:20 |
| Partizan Belgrade | 21:18 | 21:25 |
| Proleter Zrenjanin | 17:16 | 17:19 |
| Sever Subotica | 19:18 | 28:28 |
| Vojvodina Novi Sad | 24:20 | 19:18 |
| Vrbas | 19:18 | 18:27 |
| Železničar Niš | 26:22 | 17:31 |

First League 1996–97
| Pos | Club | Pts | GP | W | D | L | GF | GA |
|---|---|---|---|---|---|---|---|---|
| 1 | Crvena zvezda Belgrade | 59 | 26 | 19 | 2 | 5 | 655 | 542 |
| 2 | Lovćen Cetinje | 51 | 26 | 16 | 3 | 7 | 549 | 534 |
| 3 | Železničar Niš | 46 | 26 | 14 | 4 | 8 | 587 | 540 |
| 4 | Vrbas | 46 | 26 | 14 | 4 | 8 | 647 | 613 |
| 5 | Proleter Zrenjanin | 43 | 26 | 14 | 1 | 11 | 633 | 574 |
| 6 | Partizan Beograd | 42 | 26 | 12 | 6 | 8 | 581 | 546 |
| 7 | Epoksid Priboj | 40 | 26 | 13 | 1 | 12 | 576 | 598 |
| 8 | Metaloplastika Šabac | 35 | 26 | 11 | 2 | 13 | 569 | 545 |
| 9 | Mornar Bar | 32 | 25 | 10 | 2 | 14 | 573 | 585 |
| 10 | Crvenka | 32 | 26 | 10 | 2 | 14 | 564 | 615 |
| 11 | Jugović Kać | 32 | 26 | 9 | 5 | 12 | 535 | 564 |
| 12 | Dinamo Pančevo | 30 | 26 | 9 | 3 | 14 | 521 | 553 |
| 13 | Sever Subotica | 27 | 26 | 8 | 3 | 15 | 591 | 609 |
| 14 | Vojvodina Novi Sad | 11 | 26 | 3 | 2 | 21 | 507 | 659 |

== 1997–98 season ==
During the 1997–98 season, Lovćen stayed among the top clubs in Yugoslav handball. Finishing First League at the third place, club from Cetinje played in the play-offs, together with Partizan, Crvena zvezda and Železničar.

During the season, Lovćen made 16 wins, with 4 draws and 6 losses. Like in the previous season, club from Cetinje made score 13 matches - 13 wins at their home ground. Lovćen made quite good results in the derby matches against Partizan (34:31, 23:23) and Crvena zvezda (28:26, 26:29).

At the Play-off semifinal matches, Lovćen played against Crvena zvezda. First match, played at Cetinje, won Crvena zvezda (28:29), but Lovćen won the second game in Belgrade (23:22). Third and last match for final, played in Belgrade, finished with victory of Crvena zvezda (24:29).

For the first time in history, at June 1998, Lovćen played final of the Yugoslav Cup. Before the final round, Lovćen defeated Železničar in the quarterfinals (36:26, 25:32) and Vrbas in semifinal (28:22, 28:29). At the first final match, in Belgrade, Lovćen suffered hard defeat against Partizan - 21:30 (9:13). At the second match, played at Cetinje, Lovćen won 39:36 (13:13), but the trophy was won by Partizan.

In the 1997–98 season, Lovćen played their first matches at the European cups, against Minaur Baia Mare in the EHF Cup.

RK Lovćen results - First League 1997–98
| Opponent | Home | Away |
|---|---|---|
| Apatin | 31:28 | 21:21 |
| Crvena zvezda Belgrade | 28:26 | 26:29 |
| Crvenka | 28:25 | 26:22 |
| Dinamo Pančevo | 33:27 | 28:27 |
| Epoksid Priboj | 28:25 | 18:19 |
| Jugović Kać | 30:22 | 26:27 |
| Metaloplastika Šabac | 22:18 | 20:20 |
| Mornar Bar | 28:27 | 24:23 |
| Partizan Belgrade | 34:31 | 23:23 |
| Proleter Zrenjanin | 29:25 | 31:33 |
| Sintelon Bačka Palanka | 23:21 | 18:23 |
| Vrbas | 30:28 | 26:26 |
| Železničar Niš | 31:24 | 21:22 |

First League 1997–98
| Pos | Club | Pts | GP | W | D | L | GF | GA |
|---|---|---|---|---|---|---|---|---|
| 1 | Partizan Belgrade | 39 | 26 | 17 | 5 | 4 | 740 | 676 |
| 2 | Crvena zvezda Belgrade | 38 | 26 | 18 | 2 | 6 | 720 | 627 |
| 3 | Lovćen Cetinje | 38 | 26 | 16 | 4 | 6 | 673 | 642 |
| 4 | Železničar Niš | 32 | 26 | 16 | 0 | 10 | 712 | 671 |
| 5 | Sintelon Bačka Palanka | 32 | 26 | 16 | 0 | 10 | 678 | 654 |
| 6 | Jugović Kać | 29 | 26 | 12 | 5 | 9 | 660 | 636 |
| 7 | Proleter Zrenjanin | 27 | 26 | 12 | 3 | 11 | 661 | 682 |
| 8 | Metaloplastika Šabac | 26 | 26 | 11 | 4 | 11 | 685 | 670 |
| 9 | Apatin | 24 | 26 | 10 | 4 | 12 | 664 | 692 |
| 10 | Vrbas | 20 | 26 | 9 | 2 | 15 | 684 | 720 |
| 11 | Crvenka | 18 | 26 | 9 | 0 | 17 | 684 | 734 |
| 12 | Epoksid Priboj | 18 | 26 | 8 | 2 | 16 | 684 | 739 |
| 13 | Mornar Bar | 15 | 26 | 7 | 1 | 18 | 659 | 716 |
| 14 | Dinamo Pančevo | 10 | 26 | 2 | 6 | 18 | 605 | 680 |

== 1998–99 season ==
First League 1998–99. was interrupted after 21 leg, in March 1999, and reason was NATO bombing of Yugoslavia. During most of the season, Lovćen was the leading team in the championship, but at the moment of interruption, they were second, with only one point less than Partizan.

Before the start of the season, Lovćen was the main favorite for title. With the head coach Veselin Vujović and a few new players, club from Cetinje made a lot of good results, and among them, victories against Partizan (29:25), Crvena zvezda (22:18) and Železničar (25:21, 19:14). Lovćen made several huge wins, like those against Vrbas (35:19) or Obilić (32:19). Season was remembered by the biggest attendance in the few last seasons of Yugoslav League – match between Železničar and Lovćen in Niš watched 6,500 spectators.

RK Lovćen results - First League 1998–99
| Opponent | Home | Away |
|---|---|---|
| Apatin | dnp | 24:20 |
| Crvena zvezda Belgrade | 22:18 | 27:29 |
| Crvenka | 26:21 | 24:26 |
| Epoksid Priboj | 30:22 | 26:23 |
| Jugović Kać | 32:23 | 31:29 |
| Metaloplastika Šabac | 27:21 | dnp |
| Obilić Belgrade | 32:19 | 25:25 |
| Partizan Belgrade | 29:25 | dnp |
| Proleter Zrenjanin | 28:21 | 19:14 |
| Sintelon Bačka Palanka | dnp | 20:21 |
| Šamot Aranđelovac | dnp | 30:25 |
| Vrbas | 35:19 | 25:27 |
| Železničar Niš | 25:21 | 19:14 |

First League 1998–99
| Pos | Club | Pts | GP | W | D | L | GF | GA |
|---|---|---|---|---|---|---|---|---|
| 1 | Partizan Belgrade | 34 | 21 | 17 | 0 | 4 | 577 | 506 |
| 2 | Lovćen Cetinje | 33 | 21 | 16 | 1 | 4 | 550 | 453 |
| 3 | Sintelon Bačka Palanka | 33 | 21 | 15 | 3 | 3 | 541 | 479 |
| 4 | Crvena zvezda Belgrade | 32 | 21 | 14 | 2 | 5 | 539 | 501 |
| 5 | Crvenka | 25 | 21 | 11 | 3 | 7 | 557 | 533 |
| 6 | Železničar Niš | 22 | 21 | 10 | 2 | 9 | 545 | 538 |
| 7 | Metaloplastika Šabac | 20 | 21 | 9 | 2 | 10 | 514 | 519 |
| 8 | Proleter Zrenjanin | 19 | 21 | 9 | 1 | 11 | 476 | 497 |
| 9 | Vrbas | 17 | 21 | 7 | 3 | 11 | 534 | 567 |
| 10 | Jugović Kać | 14 | 21 | 6 | 2 | 13 | 684 | 720 |
| 11 | Obilić Belgrade | 13 | 21 | 4 | 5 | 11 | 703 | 754 |
| 12 | Apatin | 12 | 21 | 5 | 2 | 14 | 528 | 551 |
| 13 | Šamot Aranđelovac | 12 | 21 | 6 | 0 | 15 | 479 | 559 |
| 14 | Epoksid Priboj | 10 | 21 | 5 | 0 | 16 | 479 | 536 |

== 1999–00 season ==
At the 1999–2000 season, RK Lovćen hold first national trophy in the clubs’ history. Club from Cetinje became a champion of FR Yugoslavia, with impressive score in 30 matches – 27 wins, one draw and two losses. Title of the First Yugoslav League champion was the biggest success of Montenegrin men’s handball until then.

Lovćen made great season with many successful results, like wins in the derbies against Partizan (26:22, 23:22), Crvena zvezda (30:22, 27:25), Sintelon (24:21) or Jugović (24:20). Absolute domination in Montenegro, Lovćen confirmed in the matches against Berane (31:20, 29:24). The new Yugoslav champion made few huge wins, like those against Toza Marković (42:24), Vojvodina (38:24) or Epoksid (32:20). The only two defeats, Lovćen suffered at the away games in Bačka Palanka (19:24) and Kać (23:25).

There is no any similar example of domination in Yugoslav men’s handball at the 90’s, like Lovćen result from the 1999–2000 season.

Lovćen also continued their winning row at Cetinje. That was fourth season in which Lovćen made all-wins at the home games in the First League, so the number of consecutive wins at Cetinje were larger than 50.

With national title, for the first time in club’s history, Lovćen gained promotion to the EHF Champions League 2000–01.

RK Lovćen results - First League 1999–00
| Opponent | Home | Away |
|---|---|---|
| Apatin | 29:23 | 10:0 |
| Berane | 31:20 | 29:24 |
| Crvena zvezda Belgrade | 30:22 | 27:25 |
| Crvenka | 26:25 | 28:25 |
| Dubočica Leskovac | 27:25 | 28:25 |
| Epoksid Priboj | 32:20 | 20:19 |
| Jugović Kać | 24:20 | 23:25 |
| Metaloplastika Šabac | 29:24 | 26:21 |
| Partizan Belgrade | 26:22 | 23:22 |
| Proleter Zrenjanin | 30:21 | 22:20 |
| Sintelon Bačka Palanka | 24:21 | 19:24 |
| Toza Marković Kikinda | 42:24 | 20:20 |
| Vojvodina Novi Sad | 38:24 | 27:22 |
| Vrbas | 32:27 | 26:23 |
| Železničar Niš | 30:27 | 23:20 |

First League 1999–00
| Pos | Club | Pts | GP | W | D | L | GF | GA |
|---|---|---|---|---|---|---|---|---|
| 1 | Lovćen Cetinje | 55 | 30 | 27 | 1 | 2 | 801 | 660 |
| 2 | Sintelon Bačka Palanka | 51 | 30 | 25 | 1 | 4 | 806 | 670 |
| 3 | Partizan Belgrade | 44 | 30 | 21 | 2 | 7 | 833 | 734 |
| 4 | Jugović Kać | 31 | 30 | 14 | 3 | 13 | 741 | 714 |
| 5 | Crvenka | 31 | 30 | 14 | 3 | 13 | 815 | 827 |
| 6 | Metaloplastika Šabac | 30 | 30 | 13 | 4 | 13 | 738 | 723 |
| 7 | Železničar Niš | 30 | 30 | 14 | 2 | 14 | 770 | 755 |
| 8 | Toza Marković Kikinda | 29 | 30 | 14 | 1 | 15 | 708 | 710 |
| 9 | Berane | 28 | 30 | 13 | 2 | 15 | 771 | 789 |
| 10 | Crvena zvezda Belgrade | 13 | 30 | 11 | 6 | 13 | 787 | 808 |
| 11 | Dubočica Leskovac | 27 | 30 | 11 | 5 | 14 | 765 | 764 |
| 12 | Vojvodina Novi Sad | 26 | 30 | 10 | 6 | 14 | 707 | 712 |
| 13 | Proleter Zrenjanin | 26 | 30 | 11 | 4 | 15 | 703 | 723 |
| 14 | Vrbas | 20 | 30 | 9 | 2 | 19 | 744 | 797 |
| 15 | Epoksid Priboj | 15 | 30 | 6 | 3 | 21 | 670 | 756 |
| 16 | Apatin | 9 | 30 | 2 | 5 | 23 | 626 | 806 |

== 2005–06 season ==
The last handball season in Serbia and Montenegro had two parts. During the first part, clubs played qualifiers in two divided groups. At the second part, best two clubs from the Montenegrin qualifying group and four best-placed teams from Serbian qualifying group formed Super League.

Lovćen finished first in the Montenegrin qualifying group and, together with Berane, participated at the final stage - Super League of Serbia and Montenegro. Lovćen played 10 games - 5 wins, 2 draws and 3 losses. At the end, club from Cetinje was third-placed team in the last season of handball in Serbia and Montenegro. Curiosity from the 2005–06 season was about last week of Super League, which is played after the Montenegrin independence referendum, 2006.

RK Lovćen results - Super League 2005–06
| Opponent | Home | Away |
|---|---|---|
| Berane | 24:19 | 21:21 |
| Crvena zvezda Belgrade | 30:26 | 24:34 |
| Partizan Belgrade | 31:29 | 22:25 |
| Sintelon Bačka Palanka | 10:0 | 28:28 |
| Vojvodina Novi Sad | 27:19 | 18:24 |

Super League 2005–06
| Pos | Club | Pts | GP | W | D | L | GF | GA |
|---|---|---|---|---|---|---|---|---|
| 1 | Crvena zvezda Belgrade | 15 | 10 | 7 | 1 | 2 | 324 | 279 |
| 2 | Partizan Belgrade | 13 | 10 | 6 | 1 | 3 | 306 | 298 |
| 3 | Lovćen Cetinje | 12 | 10 | 5 | 2 | 3 | 236 | 227 |
| 4 | Vojvodina Novi Sad | 10 | 10 | 5 | 0 | 5 | 282 | 292 |
| 5 | Berane | 5 | 10 | 1 | 3 | 5 | 256 | 291 |
| 6 | Sintelon Bačka Palanka | 5 | 10 | 2 | 1 | 7 | 276 | 294 |

== 2006–07 season ==
Following the Montenegrin independence, national handball association of Montenegro established their own First League and Cup Competition. Lovćen became the first champion of independent Montenegro in the 2006–07 season, after 20 matches - 18 wins, 1 draw, 1 loss. That was the third national champions’ trophy for Lovćen in the history.

Lovćen won the trophy with the absolute domination during the first part of the season and in the playoffs – TOP4 League. The only defeat during the season, Lovćen suffered at the away game against Mornar (22:29). The highest win during the championship, Lovćen made against Boka - 44:24.

RK Lovćen results - First League 2006–07
| Opponent | Home | Away |
|---|---|---|
| Berane | 27:26 | 24:24 |
| Boka Tivat | 44:24 | 27:26 |
| Cepelin Cetinje | 29:20 | 27:25 |
| Mojkovac | 35:21 | 31:25 |
| Mornar Bar | 25:18 | 22:29 |
| Pljevlja | 29:27 | 30:24 |
| Sutjeska Nikšić | 30:21 | 26:22 |

First League 2006–07
| Pos | Club | Pts | GP | W | D | L | GF | GA |
|---|---|---|---|---|---|---|---|---|
| 1 | Lovćen Cetinje | 25 | 14 | 12 | 1 | 1 | 416 | 332 |
| 2 | Berane | 21 | 14 | 10 | 1 | 3 | 383 | 307 |
| 3 | Sutjeska Nikšić | 19 | 14 | 9 | 1 | 4 | 387 | 352 |
| 4 | Mornar Bar | 16 | 14 | 8 | 0 | 6 | 345 | 328 |
| 5 | Mojkovac | 13 | 14 | 5 | 3 | 6 | 342 | 374 |
| 6 | Pljevlja | 9 | 14 | 4 | 1 | 9 | 310 | 371 |
| 7 | Cepelin Cetinje | 5 | 14 | 2 | 1 | 11 | 328 | 377 |
| 8 | Boka Tivat | 4 | 14 | 1 | 2 | 11 | 336 | 406 |

At the playoffs - TOP4 League, where all the teams start with 0 points, Lovćen confirmed their power, winning all of the six final matches. The two most important games for champions' title, played against Berane, Lovćen finished with victories - 26:19, 28:26. The highest wins, Lovćen made against Mornar - 39:29, 34:23. So, club from Cetinje hold the title with 18 wins, one draw and one defeat.

RK Lovćen results - TOP4 League 2006–07
| Opponent | Home | Away |
|---|---|---|
| Berane | 26:19 | 28:26 |
| Mornar Bar | 39:29 | 34:23 |
| Sutjeska Nikšić | 34:26 | 35:33 |

First League - TOP4 2006–07
| Pos | Club | Pts | GP | W | D | L | GF | GA |
|---|---|---|---|---|---|---|---|---|
| 1 | Lovćen Cetinje | 12 | 6 | 6 | 0 | 0 | 196 | 156 |
| 2 | Berane | 6 | 6 | 2 | 2 | 2 | 152 | 154 |
| 3 | Sutjeska Nikšić | 5 | 6 | 2 | 1 | 3 | 166 | 169 |
| 4 | Mornar Bar | 1 | 6 | 0 | 1 | 5 | 141 | 179 |

== 2007–08 season ==
Second season of handball in independent Montenegro was the only one in which Lovćen didn't won any domestic trophy. Club from Cetinje finished as a second team in the Montenegrin First League, with 12 wins and 6 defeats during the season.

In the first part of the First League, Lovćen made unexpected bad performance. With 7 wins and 5 defeats, club won fourth place of the table, with placement to the TOP4 League. During the first part, Lovćen suffered defeats against Berane (22:25, 21:33), Sutjeska (17:22, 19:24) and Mornar (17:19). Numerous defeats of Lovćen were main surprise of the season.

At the other side, during the first part of the First League, Lovćen made one historical record – scoring the biggest number of goals in one match (47). That happened at 14 October 2008, on the match Boka – Lovćen 26:47. Only in the second half, Lovćen scored 34 goals.

RK Lovćen results - First League 2007–08
| Opponent | Home | Away |
|---|---|---|
| Berane | 17:22 | 21:33 |
| Boka Tivat | 29:20 | 47:26 |
| Budućnost Podgorica | 36:22 | 33:28 |
| Mojkovac | 36:30 | 33:23 |
| Mornar Bar | 31:25 | 17:19 |
| Sutjeska Nikšić | 17:22 | 19:24 |

First League 2007–08
| Pos | Club | Pts | GP | W | D | L | GF | GA |
|---|---|---|---|---|---|---|---|---|
| 1 | Berane | 22 | 12 | 11 | 0 | 1 | 357 | 264 |
| 2 | Sutjeska Nikšić | 16 | 12 | 8 | 0 | 4 | 323 | 279 |
| 3 | Mornar Bar | 15 | 12 | 7 | 1 | 4 | 268 | 265 |
| 4 | Lovćen Cetinje | 14 | 12 | 7 | 0 | 5 | 341 | 297 |
| 5 | Budućnost Podgorica | 8 | 12 | 4 | 0 | 8 | 289 | 331 |
| 6 | Mojkovac | 7 | 12 | 3 | 1 | 8 | 286 | 319 |
| 7 | Boka Tivat | 2 | 12 | 1 | 0 | 11 | 252 | 361 |

After very pure performance, as a fourth-placed team, Lovćen gained promotion to the TOP4 League for champion, but with no chances for defending a last-year title. Namely, there was a bonus-points from the first part of the seasons, so the members of TOP4 League started the second phase of season with this number of points: Berane 12, Sutjeska 6, Mornar 4, Lovćen 2.

During the TOP4 League, Lovćen made a few god results, and with row of 5 wins and only one defeat, club finished 2007–08 season. at the second place. Lovćen won both matches against Sutjeska and Mornar, with one win and one defeat against new champion - Berane. At the end, Lovćen came to the position to struggle for trophy, but didn't succeed, after lose in Berane (20:30).

RK Lovćen results - TOP4 League 2007–08
| Opponent | Home | Away |
|---|---|---|
| Berane | 31:26 | 20:30 |
| Mornar Bar | 31:19 | 23:19 |
| Sutjeska Nikšić | 18:16 | 22:19 |

First League - TOP4 2007–08
| Pos | Club | Pts | GP | W | D | L | GF | GA |
|---|---|---|---|---|---|---|---|---|
| 1 | Berane | 22 | 6 | 5 | 0 | 1 | 166 | 142 |
| 2 | Lovćen Cetinje | 12 | 6 | 5 | 0 | 1 | 145 | 129 |
| 3 | Sutjeska Nikšić | 10 | 6 | 2 | 0 | 4 | 127 | 124 |
| 4 | Mornar Bar | 4 | 6 | 0 | 0 | 6 | 125 | 168 |

== 2008–09 season ==
Rising of Budućnost Podgorica and a new unsuccessful attempt of Lovćen to get champions’ title, marked the 2008–09 season. in Montenegrin handball. Budućnost won their first title, and Lovćen again finished season as a second-placed team. At the other side, club from Cetinje won the trophy in the Montenegrin Cup.

For the first and, until today, last time in the Montenegrin handball, clubs in the First League played 28 legs. Season will be remembered by the big rivalry between Lovćen and Budućnost. Their match in Podgorica, which decided about national champion, played in 26th Leg on May 17, 2009, was the most attended game in the history of Montenegrin First League (4,000 spectators). Budućnost won 28:26 (18:14) and hold the first title in the club history. Match ended with incidents in Sports center 'Morača', with the clash of supporters, but the players Goran Đukanović (Budućnost) and Igor Marković (Lovćen) too. In the previous derbies, Lovćen won two matches at Cetinje (22:21, 27:22), and Budućnost won another game in Podgorica (29:26).

In the shadow of the Lovćen – Budućnost title run, were all the other clubs and games. Lovćen finished season with 23 wins and 5 defeats. Another one guest game of Lovćen was interrupted by incidents - away match in Berane, played in March, was dissolved too, after big fights on the ground. On the home match against Mornar, played on 15 March 2009, Lovćen conceded only 13 goals (34:13).

For the first time in the independent Montenegro, and for the third time in club history, Lovćen won the national Cup. After they eliminated Rudar in quarterfinals (24:19), and Mojkovac (26:22) in semifinals, Lovćen won the final match against Budućnost – 26:25 (13:12).

RK Lovćen results - First League 2008–09
| Opponent | Home | | Away | |
|---|---|---|---|---|
| Berane | 34:21 | 31:23 | 19:23 | 10:0 |
| Budvanska rivijera Budva | 30:22 | 26:22 | 28:22 | 33:26 |
| Budućnost Podgorica | 22:21 | 27:22 | 26:29 | 26:28 |
| Mojkovac | 30:20 | 26:28 | 29:21 | 35:24 |
| Mornar Bar | 35:20 | 34:13 | 26:20 | 25:15 |
| Pljevlja | 36:20 | 40:29 | 34:27 | 33:28 |
| Sutjeska Nikšić | 26:18 | 33:26 | 32:22 | 36:30 |

First League 2008–09
| Pos | Club | Pts | GP | W | D | L | GF | GA |
|---|---|---|---|---|---|---|---|---|
| 1 | Budućnost Podgorica | 51 | 28 | 25 | 1 | 2 | 924 | 719 |
| 2 | Lovćen Cetinje | 46 | 28 | 23 | 0 | 5 | 816 | 626 |
| 3 | Sutjeska Nikšić | 34 | 28 | 16 | 2 | 10 | 777 | 726 |
| 4 | Berane | 27 | 28 | 12 | 3 | 13 | 667 | 691 |
| 5 | Budvanska Rivijera | 23 | 28 | 11 | 1 | 16 | 698 | 753 |
| 6 | Mojkovac | 15 | 28 | 7 | 1 | 20 | 682 | 756 |
| 7 | Rudar Pljevlja | 14 | 28 | 6 | 2 | 20 | 722 | 856 |
| 8 | Mornar Bar | 14 | 28 | 7 | 0 | 21 | 616 | 775 |

== 2009–10 season ==
RK Lovćen finished season 2009-10 as a third-placed team in domestic league. That was the worst result of club since Montenegrin independence. Better than Lovćen were Budućnost and Sutjeska.
Championship was again organised with tho phases. After regular seasons, four best-placed clubs played in the TOP4 phase for champion title. After the first phase Lovćen was second on the table, but at the end finished as a third team.
At the other side, RK Lovćen won the national cup, with victory in the final match against RK Sutjeska - 18:17 (10:10).

First League 2009–10
| 1 | Budućnost Podgorica | 14 | 14 | 0 | 0 | 28 |
| 2 | Lovćen Cetinje | 14 | 11 | 1 | 2 | 23 |
| 3 | Sutjeska Nikšić | 14 | 8 | 0 | 6 | 16 |
| 4 | Rudar Pljevlja | 14 | 8 | 0 | 6 | 16 |
| 5 | Berane | 14 | 7 | 1 | 6 | 15 |
| 6 | Budvanska Rivijera Budva | 14 | 3 | 1 | 10 | 7 |
| 7 | Mornar Bar | 14 | 2 | 1 | 11 | 5 |
| 8 | Danilovgrad | 14 | 1 | 0 | 13 | 2 |

First League - TOP4 2009–10
| 1 | Budućnost Podgorica | 6 | 6 | 0 | 0 | 12 |
| 2 | Sutjeska Nikšić | 6 | 2 | 2 | 2 | 6 |
| 3 | Lovćen Cetinje | 6 | 1 | 2 | 3 | 4 |
| 4 | Rudar Pljevlja | 6 | 1 | 0 | 5 | 2 |

== 2010–11 season ==
With dissolving of RK Budućnost, Lovćen was a major favorite before the start of season 2010–11. But, after the bad results during the autumn 2010, team was far away from champion title. First phase of competition won RK Mojkovac.
In the TOP4 competition, Lovćen had better score than Mojkovac. But, at the end, opponent had a better points-score from the first phase of season and Lovćen remained runner-up. In the Cup finals, Lovćen won against Mojkovac - 31:25 (19:16).

First League 2010–11
| 1 | Mojkovac | 12 | 9 | 2 | 1 | 20 |
| 2 | Lovćen Cetinje | 12 | 7 | 2 | 3 | 16 |
| 3 | Sutjeska Nikšić | 12 | 7 | 0 | 5 | 14 |
| 4 | Budvanska Rivijera Budva | 12 | 6 | 2 | 4 | 14 |
| 5 | Rudar Pljevlja | 12 | 6 | 1 | 5 | 13 |
| 6 | Berane | 12 | 3 | 1 | 8 | 7 |
| 7 | Mornar Bar | 12 | 0 | 0 | 12 | 0 |

First League - TOP4 2010–11
| 1 | Mojkovac | 6 | 3 | 0 | 3 | 18 (6+12) |
| 2 | Lovćen Cetinje | 6 | 6 | 0 | 0 | 17 (12+5) |
| 3 | Sutjeska Nikšić | 6 | 3 | 0 | 3 | 10 (6+4) |
| 4 | Rudar Pljevlja | 6 | 0 | 0 | 6 | 3 (0+3) |

== See also ==
- RK Lovćen
- RK Lovćen in SEHA League
