= 2008–09 Montenegrin First Handball League =

Montenegrin First Handball League
- Season: 2008–09
- Champions: RK Budućnost Podgorica
- Matches: 112

The 2008–09 Montenegrin First Handball League was third season of the Montenegrin First League of Men's Handball, Montenegro's premier handball league.

== Participants ==
Location of the 2007/08 Montenegrin Handball League teams

In the Montenegrin First League 2008/09 twelve teams participated. For the first time, the competition was not divided into two stages. Instead, the clubs played 32 (33 for tie-breaking) matches in a single league format.

The following eight clubs participated in the Montenegrin First League 2007/08.

Team	City	Hall	Capacity
Budućnost	Podgorica	SC Morača	4,750
Lovćen	Cetinje	SRC Lovćen	1,450
Berane	Berane	City Hall	2,200
Sutjeska	Nikšić	SRC Nikšić	3,500
Mornar	Bar	OŠ Jugoslavija	1,000
Mojkovac	Mojkovac	City Hall	1,000
Rudar	Pljevlja	SC Ada	3,000
Budvanska rivijera	Budva	Mediterranean SC	1,500

== Final table ==
During the season, all members played 28 games. At the end, Budućnost won their first national trophy, with five points more than Lovćen.

Final table:

Pos	Team	Pld	W	D	L	Pts
1	Budućnost Podgorica	28	25	1	2	51
2	Lovćen Cetinje	28	23	0	5	46
3	Sutjeska Nikšić	28	16	2	10	34
4	Berane	28	12	3	13	27
5	Budvanska rivijera	28	11	1	16	23
6	Mojkovac	28	7	1	20	15
7	Rudar	28	6	2	20	14
8	Mornar	28	7	0	21	14

== Budućnost and Lovćen rivalry ==
Season will be remembered by the big rivalry between Lovćen Cetinje and Budućnost Podgorica. Their match in Podgorica, which decided about national champion, played in 26th Leg on May 17, 2009, was the most attended game in the history of Montenegrin First League (4,000 spectators). Budućnost won 28:26 (18:14) and hold the first title in the club history. Match ended with incidents in Sports center 'Morača', with the clash of supporters, but the players Goran Đukanović (Budućnost) and Igor Marković (Lovćen) too.

Four days later, Lovćen and Budućnost played another important match - final of the Cup of Montenegro. In front of 2,000 spectators in Cetinje, Lovćen won 26:25 (13:12).

During the season, match Berane - Lovćen, played in March, was dissolved too, after big incidents and fights on the ground.

== Summary ==
- Promotion to the EHF Champions League - qualifiers 2009/10: Budućnost Podgorica
- Promotion to the EHF Cup Winners' Cup 2009/10: Lovćen Cetinje
- Promotion to the EHF Cup 2009/10: Sutjeska Nikšić
- Promotion to the EHF Challenge Cup 2009/10: Berane, Budvanska rivijera Budva
- Relegation to the Second League 2009/10: Mojkovac (due to finances)
- Promotion to the First league 2009/10: Danilovgrad
