= 2012–13 Montenegrin First Handball League =

Montenegrin First Handball League
- Season: 2012–13
- Champions: RK Lovćen
- Relegated: RK Berane, RK Mornar
- Matches: 66

The 2012–13 Montenegrin First Handball League was seventh season of the Montenegrin First League of Men's Handball, Montenegro's premier handball league.

== Participants ==
Location of the 2012/13 Montenegrin Handball League teams

The league regularly consists of eight teams, but in the season 2012/13 there was seven participants. In the second part of season, four best clubs participated in the TOP4 league for champion, and the last three played in relegation league.

The following seven clubs participated in the Montenegrin First League 2012/13.

Team	City	Hall	Capacity
Lovćen	Cetinje	SRC Lovćen	2,050
Sutjeska	Nikšić	SRC Nikšić	3,500
Mojkovac	Mojkovac	City Hall	1,000
Berane	Berane	SC Nikoljac	3,000
Budvanska rivijera	Budva	Mediterranean SC	1,500
Mornar	Bar	SC Topolica	3,000
Ulcinj	Ulcinj	City Hall	1,500

== First part ==
During the first part of the season, all members played 12 games. Four best placed teams - Lovćen, Mojkovac, Budvanska rivijera and Sutjeska continued season in the TOP4 league for champion. Other teams were playing league for relegation.

Table of the first part of the season:

Pos	Team	Pld	W	D	L	Pts
1	Lovćen Cetinje	12	12	0	0	24
2	Mojkovac	12	6	2	4	14
3	Budvanska rivijera	12	6	1	5	13
4	Sutjeska Nikšić	12	5	2	5	12
5	Ulcinj	12	3	2	7	8
6	Mornar Bar	12	2	4	6	8
7	Berane	12	2	1	9	5

== TOP4 / relegation league ==
At the final phase, RK Lovćen Cetinje defended their champions' title from the last season. Lovćen became second team ever to finish a season without losing a point. (the first team to do it was Budućnost in the season 2009/10)
In the relegation league, most success have RK Ulcinj, which survived in the First league. Other two clubs were relegated to the Second league.

=== TOP4 League ===
Pos	Team	Pld	W	D	L	Pts
1	Lovćen Cetinje	6	6	0	0	24 (12+12)
2	Mojkovac	6	2	0	4	11 (4+7)
3	Budvanska rivijera	6	3	0	3	8 (6+2)
4	Sutjeska Nikšić	6	1	0	5	3 (2+1)

=== Relegation League ===
Pos	Team	Pld	W	D	L	Pts
1	Ulcinj	4	2	1	1	9 (5+4)
2	Mornar Bar	4	3	0	1	9 (6+3)
3	Berane	4	0	1	3	4 (1+3)

=== Summary ===
- Promotion to the EHF Cup 2013/14: Lovćen Cetinje
- Promotion to the SEHA League 2013/14: Lovćen Cetinje
- Relegation to the Second League 2013/14: Mornar Bar, Berane
- Promotion to the First league 2013/14: Boka Tivat, Danilovgrad
