= 2009–10 Montenegrin First Handball League =

Montenegrin First Handball League
- Season: 2009–10
- Champions: RK Budućnost Podgorica
- Matches: 80

The 2009–10 Montenegrin First Handball League was fourth season of the Montenegrin First League of Men's Handball, Montenegro's premier handball league.

== Participants ==
Location of the 2009/10 Montenegrin Handball League teams

Following the propositions of the competition, league had two parts. During the first, there was 14 weeks, and after that, First League was split into two parts. Four best clubs participated in the TOP4 league for champion, and the last four played in relegation league.

The following seven clubs participated in the Montenegrin First League 2009/10.

Team	City	Hall	Capacity
Budućnost	Podgorica	SC Morača	4,750
Lovćen	Cetinje	SRC Lovćen	1,450
Berane	Berane	City Hall	2,200
Sutjeska	Nikšić	SRC Nikšić	3,500
Rudar	Pljevlja	SC Ada	3,000
Budvanska rivijera	Budva	Mediterranean SC	1,500
Mornar	Bar	Topolica SC	3,000
Danilovgrad	Danilovgrad	City Hall	1,200

== First part ==
During the first part of the season, all members played 14 games. Four best placed teams - Budućnost, Lovćen, Sutjeska and Rudar continued season in the TOP4 league for champion. Other teams were playing league for relegation.

Table of the first part of the season:

Pos	Team	Pld	W	D	L	Pts
1	Budućnost Podgorica	14	14	0	0	28
2	Lovćen Cetinje	14	11	1	2	23
3	Sutjeska Nikšić	14	8	0	6	16
4	Rudar Pljevlja	14	8	0	6	16
5	Berane	14	7	1	6	15
6	Budvanska rivijera	14	3	1	10	7
7	Mornar Bar	14	2	1	11	5
8	Danilovgrad	14	1	0	13	2

== TOP4 / relegation league ==
At the final phase, RK Budućnost defended their champions title from the last season, without losing a match. Budučnost became the first team ever to finish a season without losing a point
In the relegation league, at the bottom was RK Danilovgrad.

=== TOP4 League ===
Pos	Team	Pld	W	D	L	Pts
1	Budućnost Podgorica	6	6	0	0	12
2	Sutjeska Nikšić	6	2	2	2	6
3	Lovćen Cetinje	6	1	2	3	4
4	Rudar Pljevlja	6	1	0	5	2

=== Relegation League ===
Pos	Team	Pld	W	D	L	Pts
1	Budvanska rivijera	6	4	1	1	9
2	Mornar Bar	6	4	0	2	8
3	Berane	6	3	1	2	7
4	Danilovgrad	6	0	0	6	0

=== Summary ===
- Promotion to the EHF Champions League - qualifiers 2010/11: Budućnost Podgorica (Budućnost withdraw)
- Promotion to the EHF Cup 2010/11: Lovćen Cetinje
- Promotion to the EHF Challenge Cup 2010/11: Rudar Pljevlja, Budvanska rivijera
- Relegation to the Second League 2010/11: Danilovgrad
- Withdraw from the First League 2010/11: Budućnost Podgorica (due to finances)
- Promotion to the First league 2010/11: Mojkovac
