= 2013–14 Montenegrin First Handball League =

Montenegrin First Handball League
- Season: 2013–14
- Champions: Lovćen Cetinje
- Relegated: Danilovgrad
- Matches: 60

The 2013–14 Montenegrin First Handball League was eighth season of the Montenegrin First League of Men's Handball, Montenegro's premier handball league.

== Participants ==
Location of the 2013/14 Montenegrin Handball League teams

The league regularly consists of eight teams, but in the season 2013/14 there was seven participants. In the second part of season, four best clubs participated in the TOP4 league for champion, and the last three will play in relegation league.

The following seven clubs participated in the Montenegrin First League 2012/13.

| Team | City | Hall | Capacity |
|---|---|---|---|
| Lovćen | Cetinje | SRC Lovćen | 2,050 |
| Sutjeska | Nikšić | SRC Nikšić | 3,500 |
| Mojkovac | Mojkovac | City Hall | 1,000 |
| Budvanska rivijera | Budva | Mediterranean SC | 1,500 |
| Ulcinj | Ulcinj | City Hall | 1,500 |
| Boka | Tivat | Župa | 1,500 |
| Danilovgrad | Danilovgrad | City Hall | 1,200 |

== First part ==
During the first part of the season, all members will play 12 games. First part of the First Montenegrin League 2013/14 lasted from the 9 November 2013 to 2 March 2014.

Four best placed teams - Lovćen, Budvanska rivijera, Boka and Sutjeska continued season in the TOP4 league for champion. Other teams were playing league for relegation.

Table of the first part of the season:

| Pos | Team | Pld | W | D | L | Pts |
|---|---|---|---|---|---|---|
| 1 | Lovćen Cetinje | 12 | 12 | 0 | 0 | 24 |
| 2 | Budvanska rivijera | 12 | 8 | 0 | 4 | 16 |
| 3 | Boka Tivat | 12 | 7 | 1 | 4 | 15 |
| 4 | Sutjeska Nikšić | 12 | 5 | 1 | 6 | 11 |
| 5 | Ulcinj | 12 | 5 | 0 | 7 | 10 |
| 6 | Mojkovac | 12 | 3 | 0 | 9 | 6 |
| 7 | Danilovgrad | 12 | 1 | 0 | 11 | 2 |

== TOP4 / relegation league ==
At the final phase, RK Lovćen Cetinje defended their champions' title from the last season. Lovćen became first team ever which won three consecutive titles in the Montenegrin League (2012, 2013, 2014).

In the relegation league, last placed team was Danilovgrad, which played in the relegation play-off against Second League runner-up Berane.

=== TOP4 League ===
| Pos | Team | Pld | W | D | L | Pts |
|---|---|---|---|---|---|---|
| 1 | Lovćen Cetinje | 6 | 5 | 0 | 1 | 22 (10+12) |
| 2 | Budvanska rivijera | 6 | 4 | 0 | 2 | 14 (8+6) |
| 3 | Boka Tivat | 6 | 2 | 0 | 4 | 7 (4+3) |
| 4 | Sutjeska Nikšić | 6 | 1 | 0 | 5 | 5 (2+3) |

=== Relegation League ===
| Pos | Team | Pld | W | D | L | Pts |
|---|---|---|---|---|---|---|
| 1 | Mojkovac | 4 | 4 | 0 | 0 | 12 (8+4) |
| 2 | Ulcinj | 4 | 1 | 0 | 3 | 6 (2+4) |
| 3 | Danilovgrad | 4 | 1 | 0 | 3 | 4 (2+2) |

Relegation/promotion play-off:

Berane - Danilovgrad 28:26 (11:16) - Podgorica, 28/05/2014.

=== Summary ===
- Promotion to the EHF Cup 2014/15: Lovćen Cetinje
- Promotion to the SEHA League 2014/15: Lovćen Cetinje
- Relegation to the Second League 2014/15: Danilovgrad
- Promotion to the First league 2014/15: Rudar Pljevlja, Berane
