= 2011–12 Montenegrin First Handball League =

Montenegrin First Handball League
- Season: 2011–12
- Champions: RK Lovćen Cetinje
- Matches: 74

The 2010–11 Montenegrin First Handball League was sixth season of the Montenegrin First League of Men's Handball, Montenegro's premier handball league.

== Participants ==
Location of the 2011/12 Montenegrin Handball League teams

In the Montenegrin First League 2011/12 participated eight teams. In the second part of season, four best clubs participated in the TOP4 league for champion, and the last four played in relegation league.

The following seven clubs participated in the Montenegrin First League 2007/08.

| Team | City | Hall | Capacity |
|---|---|---|---|
| Lovćen | Cetinje | SRC Lovćen | 1,450 |
| Sutjeska | Nikšić | SRC Nikšić | 3,500 |
| Berane | Berane | City Hall | 2,200 |
| Mojkovac | Mojkovac | City Hall | 1,000 |
| Rudar | Pljevlja | SC Ada | 3,000 |
| Budvanska rivijera | Budva | Mediterranean SC | 1,500 |
| Cepelin | Cetinje | SRC Lovćen | 1,450 |
| Sedmerac | Bar | SC Topolica | 3,050 |

== First part ==
During the first part of the season, all members played 14 games. Four teams - Lovćen, Mojkovac, Sutjeska and Budvanska rivijera continued season in the TOP4 league for champion. Other teams were playing league for relegation.

Handball club Cepelin Cetinje withdraw from the competition after the first part, due to financial problems. Team didn't participate in the relegation league.

Table of the first part of the season:

| Pos | Team | Pld | W | D | L | Pts |
|---|---|---|---|---|---|---|
| 1 | Lovćen Cetinje | 14 | 13 | 1 | 0 | 27 |
| 2 | Mojkovac | 14 | 10 | 2 | 2 | 22 |
| 3 | Sutjeska Nikšić | 14 | 9 | 2 | 3 | 20 |
| 4 | Budvanska rivijera | 14 | 8 | 3 | 3 | 19 |
| 5 | Rudar Pljevlja | 14 | 4 | 1 | 9 | 9 |
| 6 | Sedmerac Bar | 14 | 2 | 2 | 10 | 6 |
| 7 | Cepelin Cetinje | 14 | 2 | 1 | 11 | 5 |
| 8 | Berane | 14 | 2 | 0 | 12 | 4 |

== TOP4 / relegation league ==
At the final phase, RK Lovćen won the second champions' title in the Montenegrin Championship, and the fourth in the club history.
In the relegation league, at the bottom was RK Berane. But, how RK Cepelin quit from the competition, and RK Sedmerac and RK Rudar withdraw from the next season due to finances, Berane remained the member of the First League.

=== TOP4 League ===
| Pos | Team | Pld | W | D | L | Pts |
|---|---|---|---|---|---|---|
| 1 | Lovćen Cetinje | 6 | 5 | 0 | 1 | 21 (10+11) |
| 2 | Mojkovac | 6 | 4 | 0 | 2 | 14 (8+6) |
| 3 | Sutjeska Nikšić | 6 | 3 | 0 | 3 | 10 (6+4) |
| 4 | Budvanska rivijera | 6 | 0 | 0 | 6 | 3 (0+3) |

=== Relegation League ===
| Pos | Team | Pld | W | D | L | Pts |
|---|---|---|---|---|---|---|
| 1 | Rudar Pljevlja | 4 | 3 | 0 | 1 | 13 (6+7) |
| 2 | Sedmerac Bar | 4 | 2 | 0 | 2 | 7 (4+3) |
| 3 | Berane | 4 | 1 | 0 | 3 | 4 (2+2) |

=== Summary ===
- Promotion to the EHF Champions League - qualifiers 2012/13: Lovćen Cetinje
- Promotion to the EHF Cup 2012/13: Mojkovac
- Promotion to the EHF Challenge Cup 2012/13: Sutjeska Nikšić
- Promotion to the SEHA League 2012/13: Lovćen Cetinje
- Relegation to the Second League 2012/13: Cepelin Cetinje
- Withdraw from the First League 2012/13: Rudar Pljevlja, Sedmerac Bar (both due to finances)
- Promotion to the First league 2012/13: Ulcinj, Mornar Bar
