= 2010–11 Montenegrin First Handball League =

Montenegrin First Handball League
- Season: 2010–11
- Champions: RK Mojkovac
- Matches: 60

The 2010–11 Montenegrin First Handball League was fifth season of the Montenegrin First League of Men's Handball, Montenegro's premier handball league.

== Participants ==
Location of the 2007/08 Montenegrin Handball League teams

The league regularly consists of eight teams, but in the season 2010/11 there were seven participants, because the team of Budućnost Podgorica quit. In the second part of season, four best clubs participated in the TOP4 league for champion, and the last three played in relegation league.

The following seven clubs participated in the Montenegrin First League 2007/08.

Team	City	Hall	Capacity
Lovćen	Cetinje	SRC Lovćen	1,450
Sutjeska	Nikšić	SRC Nikšić	3,500
Berane	Berane	City Hall	2,200
Mornar	Bar	Topolica SC	3,000
Mojkovac	Mojkovac	City Hall	1,000
Rudar	Pljevlja	SC Ada	3,000
Budvanska rivijera	Budva	Mediterranean SC	1,500

== First part ==
During the first part of the season, all members played 12 games. Four teams - Mojkovac, Lovćen, Sutjeska and Rudar continued season in the TOP4 league for champion. Other teams were playing league for relegation.

Because of the rule to points from the U-21 championship adding to the all teams in the League, Rudar, which were placed at the 5th position, gone to the TOP4 league. So, fourth-placed Budvanska rivijera gone to the relegation league.

Table of the first part of the season:

Pos	Team	Pld	W	D	L	Pts
1	Mojkovac	12	9	2	1	20
2	Lovćen Cetinje	12	7	2	3	16
3	Sutjeska Nikšić	12	7	0	5	14
4	Budvanska rivijera	12	6	2	4	14
5	Rudar Pljevlja	12	6	1	5	13
6	Berane	12	3	1	8	7
7	Mornar Bar	12	0	0	12	0

== TOP4 / relegation league ==
At the final phase, RK Mojkovac won the first champions' title in the club history.
In the relegation league, at the bottom was RK Mornar.

=== TOP4 League ===
Pos	Team	Pld	W	D	L	Pts
1	Mojkovac	6	3	0	3	18 (6+12)
2	Lovćen Cetinje	6	6	0	0	17 (12+5)
3	Sutjeska Nikšić	6	3	0	3	10 (6+4)
4	Rudar Pljevlja	6	0	0	6	3 (0+3)

=== Relegation League ===
Pos	Team	Pld	W	D	L	Pts
1	Budvanska rivijera	4	3	1	0	13 (7+6)
2	Berane	4	1	0	3	8 (2+6)
3	Mornar Bar	4	1	1	2	3 (3+0)

=== Summary ===
- Promotion to the EHF Cup 2011/12: Mojkovac, Sutjeska Nikšić
- Promotion to the EHF Cup Winners' Cup 2011/12: Lovćen Cetinje
- Promotion to the SEHA League 2011/12: Lovćen Cetinje, Sutjeska Nikšić
- Relegation to the Second League 2008/09: Mornar Bar
- Promotion to the First league 2011/12: Cepelin Cetinje, Sedmerac Bar
