= 2007–08 Montenegrin First Handball League =

Montenegrin First Handball League
- Season: 2007–08
- Champions: RK Berane
- Matches played: 60

The 2007–08 Montenegrin First Handball League was second season of the Montenegrin First League of Men's Handball, Montenegro's premier handball league.

== Participants ==
Location of the 2007/08 Montenegrin Handball League teams

The league regularly consists of eight teams, but in the season 2007/08 there were seven participants, because the team of Pljevlja quit. In the second part of season, four best clubs participated in the TOP4 league for champion, and the last three played in relegation league.

The following seven clubs participated in the Montenegrin First League 2007/08.

Team	City	Hall	Capacity
Berane	Berane	City Hall	2,200
Lovćen	Cetinje	SRC Lovćen	1,450
Sutjeska	Nikšić	SRC Nikšić	3,500
Mornar	Bar	OŠ Jugoslavija	1,000
Mojkovac	Mojkovac	City Hall	1,000
Boka	Tivat	Župa	1,500
Budućnost	Podgorica	SC Morača	4,750

== First part ==
During the first part of the season, all members played 12 games. Four best placed teams - Berane, Sutjeska, Mornar and Lovćen continued season in the TOP4 league for champion. Other teams were playing league for relegation.

Table of the first part of the season:

Pos	Team	Pld	W	D	L	Pts
1	Berane	12	11	0	1	22
2	Sutjeska Nikšić	12	8	0	4	16
3	Mornar Bar	12	7	1	4	15
4	Lovćen Cetinje	12	7	0	5	14
5	Budućnost Podgorica	12	4	0	8	8
6	Mojkovac	12	3	1	8	7
7	Boka	12	1	0	11	2

== TOP4 / relegation league ==
At the final phase, RK Berane won the first champions' title in the club history.
In the relegation league, at the bottom was RK Boka.

=== TOP4 League ===
Pos	Team	Pld	W	D	L	Pts
1	Berane	6	5	0	1	22 (10+12)
2	Lovćen Cetinje	6	5	0	1	12 (10+2)
3	Sutjeska Nikšić	6	2	0	4	10 (4+6)
4	Mornar Bar	6	0	0	6	4 (0+4)

=== Relegation League ===
Pos	Team	Pld	W	D	L	Pts
1	Budućnost Podgorica	4	3	0	1	12 (6+6)
2	Mojkovac	4	3	0	1	10 (6+4)
3	Boka Tivat	4	0	0	4	2 (0+2)

=== Summary ===
- Promotion to the EHF Cup 2008/09: Berane, Lovćen Cetinje
- Promotion to the EHF Cup Winners' Cup 2008/09: Sutjeska Nikšić
- Promotion to the EHF Challenge Cup 2008/09: Mornar Bar, Budućnost Podgorica
- Relegation to the Second League 2008/09: Boka Tivat
- Promotion to the First league 2008/09: Stari Grad Budva, Rudar Pljevlja
