= 2006–07 Montenegrin First Handball League =

Montenegrin First Handball League
- Season: 2006–07
- Champions: RK Lovćen
- Relegated: RK Cepelin

The 2006–07 Montenegrin First Handball League was first season of the Montenegrin First League of Men's Handball, Montenegro's premier handball league.

== Participants ==
Location of the 2006/07 Montenegrin Handball League teams

First season of Montenegrin Handball League was established two months after the Montenegrin independence. As the National Handball Federation of Montenegro proposed, First league in its first season has eight participants. Among them were two clubs which played in 2005/06 First League of Serbia and Montenegro (Lovćen and Berane) and six teams which previously (at the season 2005/06) participated in the second level (Pljevlja, Mornar, Sutjeska, Mojkovac, Boka and Cepelin).

Following the propositions of the new competition, league had two parts. During the first, there was 14 weeks, and after that, First League was split into two parts. Four best clubs participated in the TOP4 league for champion, and the last four played in relegation league.

Team	City	Hall	Capacity
Lovćen	Cetinje	SRC Lovćen	1,450
Berane	Berane	City Hall	2,200
Pljevlja	Pljevlja	SC Ada	3,000
Sutjeska	Nikšić	SRC Nikšić	3,500
Mojkovac	Mojkovac	City Hall	1,000
Mornar	Bar	OŠ Jugoslavija	1,000
Boka	Tivat	Župa	1,500
Cepelin	Cetinje	SRC Lovćen	1,450

== First part ==
During the first part of the season, all members played 14 games. Four best placed teams - Lovćen, Berane, Sutjeska and Mornar continued season in the TOP4 league for champion. Other teams were playing league for relegation.

Table of the first part of the season:

Pos	Team	Pld	W	D	L	Pts
1	Lovćen Cetinje	14	12	1	1	25
2	Berane	14	10	1	3	21
3	Sutjeska	14	9	1	4	19
4	Mornar	14	8	0	6	16
5	Mojkovac	14	5	3	6	13
6	Pljevlja	14	4	1	9	9
7	Cepelin	14	2	1	11	5
8	Boka	14	1	2	11	4

== TOP4 / relegation league ==
At the final phase, RK Lovćen Cetinje won the first champions trophy in the independent Montenegro. In the TOP4 League, Lovćen won all six matches, including two hardest games against Berane.
In the relegation league, RK Boka won the crucial matches against Cepelin, so the club from Cetinje was relegated to the Second league.

=== TOP4 League ===
Pos	Team	Pld	W	D	L	Pts
1	Lovćen Cetinje	6	6	0	0	12
2	Berane	6	2	2	2	6
3	Sutjeska	6	2	1	3	5
4	Mornar	6	0	1	5	1

=== Relegation League ===
Pos	Team	Pld	W	D	L	Pts
1	Mojkovac	6	5	0	1	10
2	Pljevlja	6	3	0	3	6
3	Boka	6	3	0	3	6
4	Cepelin	6	1	0	5	2

=== Summary ===
- Promotion to the EHF Cup 2007/08: Lovćen Cetinje, Sutjeska Nikšić
- Promotion to the EHF Cup Winners' Cup 2007/08: Berane
- Promotion to the EHF Challenge Cup 2007/08: Mornar Bar, Mojkovac
- Relegation to the Second League 2007/08: Cepelin Cetinje
- Promotion to the First league 2007/08: Budućnost Podgorica
