= Montenegrin Men's Handball Cup =

Handball tournament in Montenegro

Montenegrin Handball Cup
- Founded: 2006
- Country: Montenegro
- Confederation: EHF
- Most recent champion: RK Budvanska rivijera (2022/23)
- Most titles: RK Lovćen Cetinje (12 titles)

The Montenegrin Men's Handball Cup (Montenegrin: Rukometni Kup Crne Gore) is an elimination handball tournament held annually. It is the second most important national title in Montenegrin handball after the Montenegrin First League.

It has been held annually since Montenegrin independence in 2006.

== History ==
=== Montenegrin clubs in Yugoslav Cup ===
Before Montenegrin independence, clubs from that Republic played in national handball Cup of Yugoslavia / Serbia and Montenegro. Most successful was RK Lovćen with two trophies won.
First significant success at that time made RK Mornar, who played in Yugoslav Cup 1994-95 finals, but lost against RK Crvena zvezda. Two years later, another Montenegrin team played in the final of Yugoslav Cup - RK Lovćen, but they were defeated against RK Partizan (39-36; 21-30). Same rivals played in the Cup finals 2000-01 and once again RK Partizan won the trophy.
First trophy for RK Lovćen came in 2001-02 on final-four in Vršac, defeating RK Sintelon (19:18) in the final. Year later, Lovćen won the final four in Belgrade (final match against RK Partizan - 28:26). Serbia and Montenegro Cup final 2004-05 was the last one in which participated RK Lovćen. On that game, Montenegrin side was defeated by RK Vojvodina (25-32).
Below is a list of Yugoslav Cup trophies won by Montenegrin clubs.

Club	Winners	Runners-up	Winning years
Lovćen Cetinje	2	3	2001-02, 2002–03
Mornar Bar	-	1	

=== Montenegrin Cup (2006-) ===
Except Montenegrin First League of Men's Handball as a top-tier league competition, after the independence, Handball Federation of Montenegro established Montenegrin Cup as a second elite national tournament. Inaugural season of Montenegrin Cup was 2006-07, and by now most successful was RK Lovćen with 9 titles. One title won RK Berane, RK Sutjeska, RK Partizan Tivat and RK Komovi Andrijevica.
Three different teams won the first three editions of the Cup - RK Berane (2006-07), RK Sutjeska (2007-08) and RK Lovćen (2008-09). That was the beginning of successful era of RK Lovćen who won seven consecutive titles from 2009 to 2015. Except that, on season 2013-14, RK Lovćen scored 41 goals in the final game against RK Danilovgrad which is the all-time record.
On season 2015-16, RK Partizan won their first Cup trophy, and next two years, the Cup winner was RK Lovćen. Big surprise came on season 2018-19, as the Cup winner became RK Komovi, based in the small town Andrijevica.

== Competition ==
=== Tournament format ===
There are two phases of Montenegrin Men's Handball Cup. At first, there are two elimination phases in February - round of 16 and the quarterfinals.
Winners of quarterfinals are participating in the second phase - Final tournament, which held on the Montenegrin Independence Day - May 21.

=== Final four ===
Traditional event, Final tournament of Montenegrin Cup, every year is organising on 20/21 May. During the first day, there are two Semi-finals, and final match is playing on the Independence Day (May 21).
Until today, hosts of Montenegrin Cup Final tournament were cities Cetinje (6), Danilovgrad (3), Tivat (2), Podgorica (1), Pljevlja (1), Budva (1), Bijelo Polje (1) and Mojkovac (1).

==== Participants ====
During the history, 15 different clubs played at the Final tournament of Montenegrin Handball Cup. Below is the list of participants on every Final tournament.

- 2006/07: RK Berane, RK Lovćen Cetinje, RK Mornar Bar, RK Cepelin Cetinje
- 2007/08: RK Sutjeska Nikšić, RK Berane, RK Lovćen Cetinje, RK Mornar Bar
- 2008/09: RK Lovćen Cetinje, RK Budućnost Podgorica, RK Mojkovac, RK Berane
- 2009/10: RK Lovćen Cetinje, RK Sutjeska Nikšić, RK Budućnost Podgorica, RK Budvanska rivijera Budva
- 2010/11: RK Lovćen Cetinje, RK Mojkovac, RK Rudar Pljevlja, RK Sutjeska Nikšić
- 2011/12: RK Lovćen Cetinje, RK Mojkovac, RK Budvanska rivijera Budva, RK Sutjeska Nikšić
- 2012/13: RK Lovćen Cetinje, RK Mojkovac, RK Ulcinj, RK Danilovgrad
- 2013/14: RK Lovćen Cetinje, RK Danilovgrad, RK Budvanska rivijera Budva, RK Sutjeska Nikšić
- 2014/15: RK Lovćen Cetinje, RK Budvanska rivijera Budva, RK Berane, RK Rudar Pljevlja
- 2015/16: RK Partizan Tivat, RK Lovćen Cetinje, RK Budvanska rivijera Budva, RK Berane
- 2016/17: RK Lovćen Cetinje, RK Mojkovac, RK Partizan Tivat, RK Budvanska rivijera Budva
- 2017/18: RK Lovćen Cetinje, RK Partizan Tivat, RK Jedinstvo Bijelo Polje, RK Ivangrad Berane
- 2018/19: RK Komovi, RK Partizan Tivat, RK Budvanska rivijera Budva, RK Jedinstvo
- 2019/20: RK Lovćen Cetinje, RK Partizan Tivat, RK Komovi, RK Budućnost Podgorica
- 2020/21: RK Lovćen Cetinje, RK Komovi, RK Partizan Tivat, RK Budvanska rivijera Budva
- 2021/22: RK Lovćen Cetinje, RK Budvanska rivijera, RK Budućnost Podgorica, RK Rudar Pljevlja
- 2022/23: RK Budvanska rivijera , RK Rudar Pljevlja, Lovćen Cetinje, RK Sutjeska Nikšić

There is not a single team which played every edition of the final four. The most appearances on the final four tournament have Lovćen (15). During the season 2012/13, Danilovgrad became first team from the Second league which played the final four tournament.

== Winners and finals ==
=== Season by season ===
During the past, most successful team in Montenegrin Cup was RK Lovćen Cetinje.
Below is the list of final matches of Montenegrin Handball Cup

Year	Venue	Winner	Runner-up	Score
2006/07	Danilovgrad	RK Berane	RK Lovćen Cetinje	23:21 (10:11)
2007/08	Danilovgrad	RK Sutjeska Nikšić	RK Berane	24:23 (9:10)
2008/09	Cetinje	RK Lovćen Cetinje	RK Budućnost Podgorica	26:25 (13:12)
2009/10	Pljevlja	RK Lovćen Cetinje	RK Sutjeska Nikšić	18:17 (10:10)
2010/11	Cetinje	RK Lovćen Cetinje	RK Mojkovac	31:25 (19:16)
2011/12	Cetinje	RK Lovćen Cetinje	RK Mojkovac	23:19 (10:12)
2012/13	Cetinje	RK Lovćen Cetinje	RK Mojkovac	28:22 (15:11)
2013/14	Danilovgrad	RK Lovćen Cetinje	RK Danilovgrad	41:28 (21:12)
2014/15	Budva	RK Lovćen Cetinje	RK Budvanska Rivijera	25:21 (13:12)
2015/16	Tivat	RK Partizan Tivat	RK Lovćen Cetinje	24:17 (9:6)
2016/17	Mojkovac	RK Lovćen Cetinje	RK Mojkovac	22:15 (8:8)
2017/18	Tivat	RK Lovćen Cetinje	RK Partizan Tivat	23:18 (12:12)
2018/19	Bijelo Polje	RK Komovi Andrijevica	RK Budvanska Rivijera	26:21 (12:13)
2019/20	Tivat	RK Lovćen Cetinje	RK Partizan Tivat	30:26 (18:13)
2020/21	Cetinje	RK Lovćen Cetinje	RK Komovi Andrijevica	31:20 (22:9)
2021/22	Podgorica	RK Lovćen Cetinje	RK Budućnost Podgorica	32:25 (15:8)
2022/23	Podgorica	RK Budvanska rivijera	RK Rudar Pljevlja	29:27 (11:13)

=== Trophies by team ===
==== Montenegrin Cup ====
There are nine different clubs which participated in the final match of Montenegrin Cup.

Four of them won the Cup.

Club	Winners	Runners-up	Winning years
RK Lovćen Cetinje	12	2	2009, 2010, 2011, 2012, 2013, 2014, 2015, 2017, 2018, 2020, 2021, 2022
RK Partizan Tivat	1	2	2016
RK Budvanska Rivijera	1	2	2023
RK Berane	1	1	2007
RK Sutjeska Nikšić	1	1	2008
RK Komovi Andrijevica	1	1	2019
RK Mojkovac	-	4	
RK Budućnost Podgorica	-	2	
RK Danilovgrad	-	1	

==== Overall ====
Below is an overall list, including titles won in both national Cups - Montenegrin Cup and FR Yugoslavia / Serbia and Montenegro Cup.

Club	Winners	Runners-up	Winning years
RK Lovćen Cetinje	14	5	2002, 2003, 2009, 2010, 2011, 2012, 2013, 2014, 2015, 2017, 2018, 2020, 2021, 2022
RK Sutjeska Nikšić	1	1	2008
RK Berane	1	1	2007
RK Partizan Tivat	1	2	2016
RK Komovi Andrijevica	1	1	2019
RK Mojkovac	-	4	
RK Budvanska Rivijera	-	2	
RK Mornar Bar	-	1	
RK Budućnost Podgorica	-	1	
RK Danilovgrad	-	1	

== See also ==
- Montenegrin First League of Men's Handball
- Montenegrin Second League of Men's Handball
