= Mirko Majić =

Montenegrin handball player (born 1989)

Personal information
- Nationality: Montenegrin
- Born: 6 June 1989 (age 37) Podgorica, Montenegro
- Height: 1.92 m (6 ft 4 in)

Sport
- Sport: Handball
- Position: Left wing
- Current club: GRK Tikveš
- Number: 64

Senior clubs
- Years: Team
- –: (Montenegro) Budućnost Podgorica
- –: (Montenegro) RK Rudar Pljevlja
- –: (Montenegro) RK Sutjeska
- –: (Montenegro) RK Danilovgrad
- 2015–2016: (North Macedonia) RK Maks Strumica
- 2016–2017: (Bosnia and Herzegovina) RK Borac m:tel
- 2017–2018: (North Macedonia) RK Radoviš
- 2018–2023: (North Macedonia) HC Butel Skopje
- 2023–: (North Macedonia) GRK Tikveš

Mirko Majić (born 6 June 1989) is a Montenegrin handball player who plays for GRK Tikveš.
