= RK Pljevlja =

Rudar
- Full name: Rukometni klub Rudar Pljevlja
- Arena: Pljevlja, Montenegro
- Capacity: 2000
- League: First Handball League
Home	Away

Rukometni klub Rudar is a handball club in Pljevlja, Montenegro.

== Trophies ==
Champion of the Sandzak 3 times!

Club to compete in a mini league for Champions.

== Famous players ==
Nenad Perunicic, Predrag Perunicic, Boban Knezevic, Goran Cmiljanic (www.rkskipper.com), Radan Rovcanin

== Famous Coaches ==
Radan Rovcanin first coach of HC Rudar Pljevlja. Originated in the club. After an excellent player career, he coach for three years. Two years in Italy and now in Rudar. He was born in Pljevlja 09.05.1971. www.rkrudar.co.me
