= RK Komovi =

Montenegrin handball club

RK Komovi Andrijevica
- Full name: Rukometni klub Komovi Andrijevica
- Founded: 1968
- Arena: Gradska dvorana Berane, Montenegro
- Capacity: 2,000
- League: Montenegrin First Handball League

Rukometni klub Komovi is a Montenegrin handball club from Andrijevica, that plays in Montenegrin First Handball League.

== History ==
Founded at the end of sixties, RK Komovi played first official games in Montenegrin Republic League, which was the third-tier competition in SFR Yugoslavia. Until the Montenegrin independence (2006), team from Andrijevica mostly played in the lowest rank, except the very few seasons during the nineties, spent in the Second League of FR Yugoslavia.
After 2006, RK Komovi became a members of Second Montenegrin League. In that competition, they played without any significant success until the season 2014–15. That year, they became a second-tier champions and gained historical promotion to Montenegrin First League.
Era of great successes for Andrijevica's squad started in 2018. After fourth place on season 2017–18, they became a runners-up of Montenegrin Championship on season 2018–19. But, the greatest result came in Montenegrin Cup, as Komovi in the final game defeated RK Budvanska Rivijera - 26:21. That was the first national trophy in the history of Andrijevica's side.
