= Montenegrin Men's Handball First League =

Men's team handball league in Montenegro

Montenegrin First League
- Current season, competition or edition: 2025–26 Montenegrin First Handball League
- Sport: Handball
- Founded: 2006
- No. of teams: 10
- Country: Montenegro
- Confederation: EHF
- Most recent champion: Lovćen (13th title)
- Most titles: Lovćen (13 titles)
- International cups: EHF Cup Winners' Cup; EHF Cup; EHF Challenge Cup
- Website: http://www.rscg.me

The Montenegrin Men's Handball First League (Montenegrin: Crnogorska prva muška rukometna liga) is the top men's team handball league in Montenegro. It is organized by the Handball Federation of Montenegro.

== History ==
=== Before independence ===
During the history, many Montenegrin clubs played in the SFR Yugoslavia / FR Yugoslavia / Serbia and Montenegro First Handball League. Among them were RK Lovćen, RK Budućnost, RK Mornar, RK Rudar and RK Berane.
First Montenegrin team which played in Yugoslav First League is Rudar, which debuted in the top-tier on season 1964–65. More than 20 years passed until next teams from Montenegro played in the top-tier. At the end of nineties, member of First League became Lovćen, and at the beginning of nineties Budućnost and Mornar. On season 1994–95, third-placed Mornar gained participation in EHF Cities Cup 1995–96 and that was the first ever performance of some Montenegrin side in European competitions.
From season 1996–97, started the domination of Lovćen – who won two champion titles in FR Yugoslavia (1999–2000; 2000–01), with two consecutive seasons in EHF Champions League. On season 2000–01, Lovćen played in Champions League quarterfinals, against THW Kiel (29–24; 22–35). That was the greatest result of some Montenegrin handball team in European competitions.
During the new century, except Lovćen, in the First League of FR Yugoslavia played Rudar (at that time under the name Pljevlja), Berane and Budućnost.

Below is the list of performances of Montenegrin clubs in Yugoslav Handball League with final placements on each season.

Club	65	69	89	90	91	92	93	94	95	96	97	98	99	00	01	02	03	04	05	06
Rudar	11	13	–	–	–	–	–	–	–	–	–	–	–	–	–	7	7	8	5	–
Lovćen	–	–	6	11	15	–	–	–	7	12	2	3	2	1	1	2	2	5	7	3
Budućnost	–	–	–	–	16	–	–	–	–	–	–	–	–	–	15	–	–	–	–	–
Mornar	–	–	–	–	–	7	8	6	3	9	9	13	–	–	–	–	–	–	–	–
Berane	–	–	–	–	–	–	–	–	–	–	–	–	–	9	11	6	12	–	10	5

The only Montenegrin club who gained trophies in Yugoslav League was RK Lovćen. They gained two champion titles, with four finishes as a runner-up of championship.
Below is the list of Montenegrin clubs' champion titles in the First League of Yugoslavia.

Club	Winners	Runners-up	Winning years
RK Lovćen Cetinje	2	4	1999–00, 2000–01

=== After independence ===
Soon after the Montenegrin independence referendum, Handball Federation of Montenegro founded its own competitions, with the First League as a top-tier competition. During the history, RK Lovćen was most successful side and participated three times on regional SEHA League.
In the league participate eight or ten clubs, and the season have two parts. During the first part, there are 14 or 18 legs, after which are forming two groups – TOP4 (league for the champion) and league for relegation.
First League is one of three men's handball competitions in Montenegro. Other high level competition is Montenegrin Cup.

==== Period 2006–2015 ====
First title holder in independent Montenegro was RK Lovćen, who won the trophy on season 2006–07. Their biggest opponent at the time was RK Berane, who won the champions' battle during the next season.
Next two years saw the domination of RK Budućnost from Podgorica, who won two consecutive titles. Big incidents occurred at the games during both seasons. Match RK Budućnost – RK Lovćen, which decided about national champion, played on 17 May 2009, was the most attended game in the history of Montenegrin First League (4,000 spectators). Budućnost won 28:26 (18:14) and held the first title in the club history. Match ended with incidents in Sports center 'Morača', with the clash of supporters, but the players Goran Đukanović (Budućnost) and Igor Marković (Lovćen) too. Big crowd disturbances previously happened at the game RK Berane – RK Lovćen.
RK Budućnost was dissolved during the summer 2010. During the season 2010–11, RK Brskovo (at that time under the name RK Mojkovac) gained their first-ever trophy, after title race with RK Lovćen.
From 2011 to 2015, RK Lovćen won four consecutive titles. At that time, team from Cetinje played three seasons in SEHA League, while RK Sutjeska participated once.

==== Period 2016– ====
With poor performances of RK Lovćen and following earlier relegations of many notable teams as RK Berane or RK Sutjeska, title holder on season 2015–16 was RK Budvanska rivijera. Next season, the trophy won RK Partizan from Tivat.
New time of RK Lovćen domination started in 2017. Team from Cetinje won two consecutive trophies in seasons 2017–18 and 2018–19.
Season 2019–20 was interrupted after 12 weeks, due to coronavirus pandemic. During the April, Montenegrin national handball federation decided to erase all the results in every single competition. But, after the consultations with the First League members in May, federation changed the decision, so the table after 13 weeks became a final score of the season. With that decision, RK Lovćen won the title, while RK Komovi became a runner-up.

== Champions ==
Since the inaugural season (2006–07), five clubs have been champion.

=== Titles by season ===
Season	Champions	Runners-up	Third
2006–07	RK Lovćen Cetinje	RK Berane	RK Sutjeska Nikšić
2007–08	RK Berane	RK Lovćen Cetinje	RK Sutjeska Nikšić
2008–09	RK Budućnost Podgorica	RK Lovćen Cetinje	RK Sutjeska Nikšić
2009–10	RK Budućnost Podgorica	RK Sutjeska Nikšić	RK Lovćen Cetinje
2010–11	RK Brskovo Mojkovac	RK Lovćen Cetinje	RK Sutjeska Nikšić
2011–12	RK Lovćen Cetinje	RK Brskovo Mojkovac	RK Sutjeska Nikšić
2012–13	RK Lovćen Cetinje	RK Brskovo Mojkovac	RK Budvanska rivijera
2013–14	RK Lovćen Cetinje	RK Budvanska rivijera	RK Partizan Tivat
2014–15	RK Lovćen Cetinje	RK Budvanska rivijera	RK Berane
2015–16	RK Budvanska rivijera	RK Partizan Tivat	RK Lovćen Cetinje
2016–17	RK Partizan Tivat	RK Lovćen Cetinje	RK Brskovo Mojkovac
2017–18	RK Lovćen Cetinje	RK Partizan Tivat	RK Jedinstvo Bijelo Polje
2018–19	RK Lovćen Cetinje	RK Komovi Andrijevica	RK Partizan Tivat
2019–20	RK Lovćen Cetinje	RK Komovi Andrijevica	RK Partizan Tivat
2020–21	RK Lovćen Cetinje	RK Budvanska rivijera	RK Komovi Andrijevica
2021–22	RK Budvanska rivijera	RK Lovćen Cetinje	RK Budućnost Podgorica
2022–23	RK Lovćen Cetinje	RK Budvanska rivijera	RK Rudar Pljevlja
2023–24	RK Lovćen Cetinje	RK Budvanska rivijera	RK Rudar Pljevlja
2024–25	RK Lovćen Cetinje	RK Budućnost Podgorica	RK Rudar Pljevlja
2025–26	RK Lovćen Cetinje	RK Budvanska rivijera	RK Sutjeska Nikšić

=== Titles by Club ===
==== Montenegrin League ====
Since 2006, six clubs have been Montenegrin handball champion.

The most successful club is RK Lovćen Cetinje with 12 titles, while RK Budućnost Podgorica and RK Budvanska rivijera have won 2 titles. RK Brskovo, RK Berane and RK Partizan Tivat all have a single championship title.

With 2 titles from FR Yugoslavia Championship (2000, 2001), two times winner of the FRY Cup (2002, 2003), 13 titles in Montenegrin league and 12 wins in Montenegrin Cup, RK Lovćen is the most successful club of Montenegro.

Club	Titles	Runners-up	Years won
RK Lovćen Cetinje	13	5	2007, 2012, 2013, 2014, 2015, 2018, 2019, 2020, 2021, 2023, 2024, 2025, 2026
RK Budućnost Podgorica	2	1	2009, 2010
RK Budvanska rivijera	2	6	2016, 2022
RK Berane	1	1	2008
RK Brskovo Mojkovac	1	2	2011
RK Partizan Tivat	1	2	2017

==== Overall ====
Below is an overall list, with titles won in both leagues – Montenegrin League and FR Yugoslavia / Serbia and Montenegro Championship.

Club	Titles	Runners-up	Years won
RK Lovćen Cetinje	15	8	2000, 2001, 2007, 2012, 2013, 2014, 2015, 2018, 2019, 2020, 2021, 2023, 2024, 2025, 2026
RK Budućnost Podgorica	2	1	2009, 2010
RK Budvanska rivijera	2	6	2016, 2022
RK Berane	1	1	2008
RK Brskovo Mojkovac	1	2	2011
RK Partizan Tivat	1	2	2017

== Performances by clubs ==
=== Seasons ===
During the past, in Montenegrin First League participated 17 different teams. Only one club competed in the all seasons – Lovćen.

Club	Participations	Seasons
RK Lovćen Cetinje	20	2007, 2008, 2009, 2010, 2011, 2012, 2013, 2014, 2015, 2016, 2017, 2018, 2019, 2020, 2021, 2022, 2023, 2024, 2025, 2026
RK Brskovo Mojkovac	16	2007, 2008, 2009, 2011, 2012, 2013, 2014, 2015, 2016, 2017, 2018, 2022, 2023, 2024, 2025, 2026
RK Budvanska rivijera	16	2009, 2010, 2011, 2012, 2013, 2014, 2015, 2016, 2019, 2020, 2021, 2022, 2023, 2024, 2025, 2026
RK Berane	15	2007, 2008, 2009, 2010, 2011, 2012, 2013, 2015, 2016, 2021, 2022, 2023, 2024, 2025, 2026
RK Rudar Pljevlja	15	2007, 2009, 2010, 2011, 2012, 2015, 2016, 2017, 2020, 2021, 2022, 2023, 2024, 2025, 2026
RK Partizan Tivat	15	2007, 2008, 2014, 2015, 2016, 2017, 2018, 2019, 2020, 2021, 2022, 2023, 2024, 2025, 2026
RK Sutjeska Nikšić	13	2007, 2008, 2009, 2010, 2011, 2012, 2013, 2014, 2022, 2023, 2024, 2025, 2026
RK Mornar 7 Bar	10	2017, 2018, 2019, 2020, 2021, 2022, 2023, 2024, 2025, 2026
RK Jedinstvo Bijelo Polje	9	2018, 2019, 2020, 2021, 2022, 2023, 2024, 2025, 2026
RK Budućnost Podgorica	8	2008, 2009, 2010, 2022, 2023, 2024, 2025, 2026
RK Komovi Andrijevica	7	2016, 2018, 2019, 2020, 2021, 2022, 2023
RK Mornar Bar	6	2007, 2008, 2009, 2010, 2011, 2013
RK Danilovgrad	5	2010, 2014, 2020, 2021, 2022
RK Ulcinj	3	2013, 2014, 2015
RK Cepelin Cetinje	2	2007, 2012
RK Ivangrad Berane	2	2017, 2019
RK Zabjelo	2	2025, 2026
RK Sedmerac Bar	1	2012

=== Final placements ===
Below is the list of participants of the First League with their placements during the every single season.

Club	07	08	09	10	11	12	13	14	15	16	17	18	19	20	21	22	23	24	25	26
RK Berane	2	1	4	7	6	8	7	–	3	4	–	–	–	–	4	5	4	7	6	7
RK Partizan	7	7	–	–	–	–	–	3	5	2	1	2	3	3	5	7	9	4	5	9
RK Budućnost	–	5	1	1	–	–	–	–	–	–	–	–	–	–	–	3	5	6	2	4
RK Budvanska rivijera	–	–	5	6	5	4	3	2	2	1	–	–	5	7	2	1	2	2	7	2
RK Cepelin	8	–	–	–	–	7	–	–	–	–	–	–	–	–	–	–	–	–	–	–
RK Danilovgrad	–	–	–	8	–	–	–	7	–	–	–	–	–	8	8	12	12	–	–	–
RK Ivangrad	–	–	–	–	–	–	–	–	–	–	6	–	7	–	–	–	–	–	–	–
RK Jedinstvo	–	–	–	–	–	–	–	–	–	–	–	3	4	5	9	8	11	9	10	10
RK Komovi	–	–	–	–	–	–	–	–	–	7	–	4	2	2	3	10	7	–	–	–
RK Lovćen	1	2	2	3	2	1	1	1	1	3	2	1	1	1	1	2	1	1	1	1
RK Brskovo Mojkovac	5	6	6	–	1	2	2	5	6	5	3	5	–	–	–	9	8	10	11	11
RK Mornar	4	4	8	7	7	–	6	–	–	–	–	–	–	–	–	–	–	–	–	–
RK Mornar 7	–	–	–	–	–	–	–	–	–	–	5	6	6	6	6	6	6	5	8	6
RK Rudar	6	–	7	4	5	5	–	–	4	6	4	–	–	4	7	4	3	3	3	5
RK Sedmerac	–	–	–	–	–	6	–	–	–	–	–	–	–	–	–	–	–	–	–	–
RK Sutjeska	3	3	3	2	3	3	4	4	–	–	–	–	–	–	–	11	10	8	9	3
RK Ulcinj	–	–	–	–	–	–	5	6	7	–	–	–	–	–	–	–	–	–	–	–
RK Zabjelo	–	–	–	–	–	–	–	–	–	–	–	–	–	–	–	–	–	–	4	8

=== All-time table ===
All-time Montenegrin First League table is a ranking of all Montenegrin handball clubs based on their performance in top tier. In this ranking 2 points are awarded for a win, 1 for a draw, and 0 for a loss. Highlighted clubs played in the First League in the 2019/20 season.

Rank	Club	Seasons^{a}	Games	W	D	L	Pts
1	RK Lovćen	15	260	232	10	38	454
2	RK Budvanska rivijera	11	208	107	15	86	208
3	RK Brskovo Mojkovac	11	194	83	14	95	'180
4	RK Partizan	10	172	85	10	77	180
5	RK Berane	10	196	82	13	101	177 '
6	RK Sutjeska	8	160	81	11	68	173
7	RK Rudar	10	186	66	10	110	142
8	RK Budućnost	3	64	52	1	11	105
9	RK Komovi	5	82	38	5	39	81
10	RK Mornar	6	112	34	8	70	76
11	RK Jedinstvo	4	68	24	3	41	51
12	RK Mornar 7	5	76	25	1	50	51
13	RK Ulcinj	3	48	12	4	32	28
14	RK Danilovgrad	4	70	10	1	59	21
15	RK Cepelin	2	34	5	2	27	12
16	RK Ivangrad	2	30	4	2	24	10
17	RK Sedmerac	1	18	4	1	13	9

^aIncluding the season 2020/21

== Attendances by season ==
Season	Avg	Overall	M	H	CH	CL
2006–07	570	45,600	80	3,000	Berane (1,160)	Boka (260)
2007–08	551	34,700	63	2,500	Berane (1,278)	Boka (150)
2008–09	651	72,900	112	4,000	Lovćen (875)	Budva (286)
2009–10	560	44,800	80	3,000	Budućnost (1,020)	Danilovgrad (240)
2010–11	557	33,400	60	1,500	Brskovo (1,033)	Mornar (288)
2011–12	387	28,600	74	1,200	Lovćen (690)	Sedmerac (222)
2012–13	448	26,900	60	1,500	Brskovo (778)	Berane (275)
2013–14	402	20,900	52	1,000	Lovćen (522)	Danilovgrad (188)
2014–15	434	25,150	58	1,500	Rudar (833)	RK Ulcinj (183)
2015–16	388	23,300	60	1,000	Budva (478)	Komovi (144)
2016–17	416	17,450	42	1,000	Lovćen (643)	Ivangrad (214)
2017–18	313	13,750	44	1,200	Lovćen (457)	Mornar 7 (183)
2018–19	331	19,850	60	1,500	Ivangrad (575)	Partizan (167)
2019–20	470	22,100	47	1,500	Rudar (1,033)	Partizan (117)
2020–21	Without attendance due to the coronavirus pandemic					

M = Number of matches (only matches with spectators counted); H = Highest attendance on one match; CH = Club with highest average attendance; CL = Club with lowest average attendance

== Current season ==
At the first part of competition, nine teams play a two-round robin competition. In second phase, four best-placed teams are playing six-weeks long League for champion, while all the others are participating in playout.
The following clubs compete in the First League during the 2020–21 season.

Team	City	Arena	Capacity
Berane	Berane	Gradska dvorana Berane	2,200
RK Budvanska rivijera	Budva	Mediterranean SC	1,500
Danilovgrad	Danilovgrad	City Hall	1,000
Jedinstvo	Bijelo Polje	SC Nikoljac	3,000
Komovi	Andrijevica	Gradska dvorana Berane	2,200
Lovćen	Cetinje	SRC Lovćen	1,500
Mornar 7	Bar	Topolica	3,000
Partizan	Tivat	Župa	1,500
Rudar	Pljevlja	SC Ada	3,000

== Montenegrin handball clubs in SEHA League ==
Southeastern European Handball Association League, or SEHA League is founded at 2011, and Montenegrin clubs were part of it since first season. Most successful Montenegrin representative in regional league was RK Lovćen.
Below is list of participation of Montenegrin clubs by every season of SEHA League.

Season	Club	Pos	G	W	D	L
2011–12	RK Lovćen Cetinje	6	21	12	0	9
2011–12	RK Sutjeska Nikšić	10	21	3	1	17
2012–13	RK Lovćen Cetinje	6	18	9	2	7
2013–14	RK Lovćen Cetinje	9	18	3	2	13

== Montenegrin handball clubs in European competitions ==
Montenegrin men's handball clubs are participating in the EHF competitions since the season 1995–96.
First team which ever competed at the European cups was Mornar Bar and most successful Montenegrin represent in the European competitions is Lovćen Cetinje. The other Montenegrin clubs which competed at the EHF competitions are Berane, Rudar Pljevlja, Budućnost Podgorica, Sutjeska Nikšić, Brskovo and RK Budvanska rivijera.
The greatest result in the European cups made RK Lovćen during the season 2000–01. As a champion of FR Yugoslavia, Lovćen won fifth place in the EHF Champions League.
Below is a list of Montenegrin teams which played in the European competitions.

Club	S	G	W	D	L	GD	Pts
Lovćen Cetinje	20	73	27	4	42	1860:1984	56
Berane	4	16	10	0	6	459:453	20
Budućnost Podgorica	2	16	9	2	5	483:450	20
Sutjeska Nikšić	5	14	3	2	9	323:372	11
Mornar Bar	4	10	4	0	6	282:280	8
Brskovo Mojkovac	4	10	3	0	7	200:274	6
Partizan Tivat	3	8	1	3	4	187:231	5
Rudar Pljevlja	1	4	2	0	2	97:114	4
RK Budvanska rivijera	3	6	0	0	6	135:171	0
Jedinstvo Bijelo Polje	1	2	0	0	2	46:73	0
10 TEAMS		159	59	11	89	4072:4402	129

S – seasons; G – games; W – wins; D – draws; L – losses; GD – goal difference; Pts – points (win = 2pts; draw = 1)

== See also ==
- Montenegrin handball clubs in European competitions
- Montenegrin Second League of Men's Handball
- Montenegrin Men's Handball Cup
- Montenegrin First League of Women's Handball
