= RK Ulcinj =

Montenegrin handball club

- Full name: Rukometni klub Ulcinj
- Arena: Maršal Tito; Ulcinj, Montenegro
- Capacity: 1,500
- Head coach: Mustafa Kollari
- League: Montenegrin First League
- 2013/14.: 5th
- Club colours
Home	Away

Rukometni klub Ulcinj (Albanian: Klubi i Hendbollit Ulqini) is a Montenegrin handball club based in Ulcinj, that plays in Montenegrin First League.

== History ==
During the past, RK Ulcinj was a member of lowest competitions in Montenegro. But, during the first half of the 80's, club was dissolved. Almost three decades after that, at the 2010, the club was reactivated. Only two years later, at the summer 2012, RK Ulcinj gained promotion to the Montenegrin First League.

== First League seasons ==
RK Ulcinj played in the Montenegrin First League during the seasons 2012/13, 2013/14, 2014/15.
