= Montenegrin Second League of Men's Handball =

Druga Muška Liga
- Founded: 2006
- No. of teams: 8
- Country: Montenegro
- Confederation: EHF
- Most recent champions: RK Berane (2019–20)
- Level on pyramid: 2
- Website: http://www.rscg.me

The Montenegrin Second League of Men's Handball is the lower Men's handball league in Montenegro. It is organized by the Handball Federation of Montenegro. The league has seven teams.

It's one and the lower of the three official men's handball competitions in Montenegro – other are Montenegrin First League and Cup of Montenegro.

The winner of the Second League gets promotion to the First League. Second placed team is playing playoffs against seventh placed team from the First League.

== Winners ==
- 2006/2007 – RK Budućnost (Podgorica)
- 2007/2008 – RK Stari grad (Budva)
- 2008/2009 – RK Danilovgrad (Danilovgrad)
- 2009/2010 – RK Mojkovac (Mojkovac)
- 2010/2011 – RK Cepelin (Cetinje)
- 2011/2012 – RK Ulcinj (Ulcinj)
- 2012/2013 – RK Boka (Tivat)
- 2013/2014 – RK Rudar (Pljevlja)
- 2014/2015 – RK Komovi (Andrijevica)
- 2015/2016 – RK Ivangrad (Berane)
- 2016/2017 – RK Jedinstvo (Bijelo Polje)
- 2017/2018 – RK Budvanska Rivijera (Budva)
- 2018/2019 – RK Rudar (Pljevlja)
- 2019/2020 – RK Berane (Berane)
- 2020/2021 – RK Brskovo (Mojkovac)

== See also ==
- Montenegrin First League of Men's Handball
- Montenegrin Men's Handball Cup
