= RK Danilovgrad =

Montenegrin handball club

- Full name: Rukometni klub Danilovgrad
- Nickname: Gospoda
- Founded: 1953. godine
- Arena: Gradska hala Danilovgrad, Montenegro
- Capacity: 1,200
- President: Miloš Simonović
- Head coach: Filip Simonović
- League: Druga liga Crne Gore

Rukometni klub Danilovgrad is a handball club from Danilovgrad. The club has a rich history and tradition and is a member of Montenegrin Men's Handball First League.

== History ==
For most of its past, Danilovgrad played in the Montenegrin Republic League, with few seasons in the Second League. After the Montenegrin independence, club became a member of Second League, and gained the historical promotion to the Montenegrin First League in the summer 2009.

== First League seasons ==
RK Danilovgrad played in the Montenegrin First League during the seasons 2009/10, 2013/14.
