= RK Mornar Bar =

Montenegrin handball club

- Full name: Rukometni klub Mornar Bar
- Founded: 1984
- Arena: Topolica Sport Hall; Bar, Montenegro
- Capacity: 3,000
- League: Second Handball League
- 2013/14.: 3rd
- Club colours
Home	Away

Rukometni klub Mornar is a Montenegrin handball club from Bar, that plays in Montenegrin Second Handball League.

== History ==
Formed in 1984, RK Mornar quickly became one of the best Montenegrin handball clubs. They made first promotion to the Yugoslav First League in 1991, and few years after, at the season 1995/96, played in the finals of the Cup of FR Yugoslavia. In 1995, Mornar became first Montenegrin men's handball club which ever participated in the EHF European Cups.

After Lovćen Cetinje, Mornar was the most successful Montenegrin handball club in the era of FR Yugoslavia/Serbia and Montenegro, with the nine seasons in the First League.

Following the Montenegrin independence, Mornar played most seasons in the Montenegrin First League.

== First League seasons ==
In the era of SFR Yugoslavia and FR Yugoslavia/Serbia and Montenegro, RK Mornar participated in the First League during the eight seasons: 1991/92, 1992/93, 1993/94, 1994/95, 1995/96, 1996/97, 1997/98, 2002/03, 2003/04.

After the Montenegrin independence, Mornar played in the Montenegrin First League during the seasons 2006/07, 2007/08, 2008/09, 2009/10, 2010/11, 2012/13.

== European Cups ==
Mornar played few seasons in the EHF European competitions:

1995/96 - EHC Cities Cup

1996/97 - EHF Cup Winners' Cup

2007/08 - EHF Challenge Cup

2008/09 - EHF Challenge Cup

=== Matches ===
Season	Competition	Round	Opponent	Score
1995/96	EHF Cities Cup	1/32	(Bulgaria) Belassitza Petritch	26:15, 16:17
1995/96	EHF Cities Cup	1/16	(Ukraine) Swetotechnik Brovary	29:20, 14:20
1995/96	EHF Cities Cup	1/8	(Croatia) Sisak	28:27, 20:28
1996/97	EHF Cup Winners' Cup	1/16	(North Macedonia) Mladost Bogdanci	41:28, 16:29
2007/08	EHF Challenge Cup	1/32	(Belarus) HPC Arkatron Minsk	28:27, 18:26
2008/09	EHF Challenge Cup	1/16	(Portugal) Maritimo da Madeira	27:29, 19:37
