= RK Budvanska rivijera =

Montenegrin handball club

- Full name: Rukometni klub Budvanska rivijera Budva
- Founded: 2006
- Arena: Mediterranean Sports Center; Budva, Montenegro
- Capacity: 1,500
- League: Montenegrin First League; Regional Handball League
- 2025–26: 2nd
- Club colours
Home	Away

Rukometni klub Budvanska rivijera is a Montenegrin professional men's handball club from Budva, that plays in Montenegrin First League and the Regional League.

== History ==
RK Budvanska rivijera is among the youngest handball clubs in Montenegro. It was formed in 2006, under the name RK Stari grad. After two seasons in the Second League, club gained promotion to the First League at the end of 2007/08 season. During the summer of 2008, club was renamed into RK Budvanska rivijera.

During the period 2008–2013, Budvanska Rivijera became a regular participant of the strongest handball league in Montenegro, even playing two seasons in the European cups.

In the season 2015–16, Budvanska Rivijera won the champions title in Montenegrin First League, after a hard struggle with RK Lovćen and RK Boka. This was a historical success for the team from Budva.

The team then fell into a financial crisis, which soon led to a relegation from the Montenegrin highest handball competition. Next few seasons were tough, with many key players, that have won the championship in 2015/16, leaving the club. Budvanska rivijera, however, managed to stabilize and finally returned to the Montenegrin First League in 2018. As of 2024, it is still playing in it.

After regaining a place among the strongest Montenegrin handball clubs in 2018, Budvanska rivijera once again started building a championship team. Finally, in the season 2021/22, after long 6 years and many problems and rebuilding, Budvanska rivijera managed to reclaim the title of a Montenegrin handball champion, becoming only the third Montenegrin team to win multiple championship titles (alongside Lovćen and Budućnost).

== Honours and achievements ==
National Championships - 2

- Champion of Montenegro (2)
  - 2016, 2022

== First League seasons ==
RK Budvanska rivijera played in the Montenegrin First League during the seasons 2008/09, 2009/10, 2010/11, 2011/12, 2012/13, 2013/14, 2014/15, 2015/16, 2018/19, 2019/20, 2020/21, 2021/22.

== European Cups ==
Budvanska rivijera has played three seasons in the EHF European competitions:

2009/10 - EHF Challenge Cup

2010/11 - EHF Challenge Cup

2016/17 - EHF Cup

=== Matches ===
Season	Competition	Round	Opponent	Score
2009/10	EHF Challenge Cup	1/32	(Norway) Stord Handball	20:24, 22:29
2010/11	EHF Challenge Cup	1/32	(Montenegro) Rudar Pljevlja	24:34, 19:26
2016/17	EHF Cup	Round 1	(Greece) Filippos Verias	26:28, 24:30

=== Current squad ===
RK Budvanska Rivijera roster
Goalkeepers: (Montenegro) Lazar Pešić; (Montenegro) Lazar Pešić; Wingers: (Montenegro) Stefan Vuković; (Montenegro) Ratko Suknović	Line players: (Montenegro) Marko Čampar; Back players: (Montenegro) Vladimir Osmajić; (Montenegro) Slobodan Bulajić; (Montenegro) Radivoje Đođić; (Montenegro) Marko Zeković; (Montenegro) Slaviša Lacmanović	Technical staff: Head coach: (Montenegro) Brano Božović

== Famous players ==
- (Montenegro) Goran Đukanović
