= RK Partizan Tivat =

Montenegrin handball club

- Full name: Rukometni klub Partizan Tivat
- Founded: 1949
- Arena: Župa Sports Center; Tivat, Montenegro
- Capacity: 1,500
- Head coach: Dejan Stjepčević
- League: Montenegrin First League
- 2013/14.: 3rd
- Club colours
Home	Away

Rukometni klub Partizan (previously RK Boka) is a Montenegrin handball club from Tivat that plays in Montenegrin First League.

== History ==
The first handball club from Tivat, RK Partizan, was formed in 1949. Between the 1950s and 1990s, it competed in a number of different leagues, mostly in the Second League.

During FR Yugoslavia and Serbia and Montenegro, RK Partizan was renamed RK Tivat. The team participated in the Second Yugoslav League - 'West' and in the Montenegrin Republic League.

In 2005, RK Tivat and RK Kotor, from the nearest city of Kotor, were merged into one club. The new club, a successor of RK Tivat, was named RK Boka. RK Boka played their first season in the Montenegrin First League in 2006.

The club was renamed during the summer of 2014, returning to the old name RK Partizan.

== European record ==
Season	Competition	Round	Club	1st leg	2nd leg	Aggregate
2016–17	Challenge Cup	R3	(Cyprus) A.S.S. Spes	27–21	22–22	49–43
2016–17	Challenge Cup	1/8	(Iceland) Valur	21–21	24–24	55–55

== First League seasons ==
RK Partizan played in the Montenegrin First League during the seasons 2006/07, 2007/08, 2013/14, 2014/15.
