= RK Sutjeska Nikšić =

RK Sutjeska
- Full name: Rukometni klub Sutjeska Nikšić
- Founded: 1949.
- Arena: Dvorana SC Nikšić
- Capacity: 4,000
- League: Montenegrin First League
- 2013/14.: 4th
- Club colours
Home	Away

Active sport clubs of Sutjeska
Football	Basketball	Volleyball
Handball	Athletics	Shooting
Judo	Handball Women	Boxing
- Tennis

Rukometni klub Sutjeska is a Montenegrin handball club from Nikšić. RK Sutjeska is former Cup winner of Montenegro.

== History ==
RK Sutjeska was formed at 1949, and during the decades played in the Montenegrin Republic League, and in the Second Yugoslav League.

Biggest successes, Sutjeska made after the Montenegrin independence, when they became a members of the First League. At their first season in that competition (2006/07), Sutjeska won the third place, with first placement to the European cups. A year later, Sutjeska made their historical result – winning the Cup of Montenegro in Danilovgrad.

Until 2014, together with Lovćen Cetinje, Sutjeska was the only club which competed in every season of the Montenegrin First League. But, before the 2014/15 season, the club withdrew from the First League, because of financial difficulties. After 8 years in the season 2021/22 Sutjeska back in the First League.

== Trophies ==
- Winner of the Montenegrin Cup (1)
  - 2008.

== Supporters and rivalries ==
"The Dukes" (Vojvode) is the popular name for the most ardent Sutjeska fans. They have been established as an NGO in 1988 in Nikšić and today constitute one of the most numerous groups of supporters in Montenegro. They traditionally follow all the matches of all sports that compete under the "Sutjeska" name, both home and away matches. The biggest Sutjeska rival is RK Budućnost Podgorica, as the "Barbarians" (Varvari) are the other large group of supporters in the country.

== First League seasons ==
RK Sutjeska played in the Montenegrin First League during the seasons 2006/07, 2007/08, 2008/09, 2009/10, 2010/11, 2011/12, 2012/13, 2013/14, 2021/22.

== Participation in the SEHA League ==
Except Lovćen, which is a permanent member of the Regional SEHA League, Sutjeska is the only other Montenegrin club which participated in that competition. Sutjeska played in the SEHA league 2011/12 and finished the season at the 10 od 12 places of the table.

In that season, Sutjeska played against CO Zagreb (30:33, 27:37), Tatran Prešov (20:26, 22:42), Vardar Skopje (24:29, 23:33), Metalurg Skopje (22:28, 23:31), Nexe Našice (17:32, 19:32), Lovćen Cetinje (20:26, 22:31), Borac Banja Luka (22:32, 20:23), Metaloplastika Šabac (20:22), Izviđač Ljubuški (19:19, 27:29), Bosna Sarajevo (23:17, 24:30) and Crvena zvezda Beograd (29:22, 21:20).

== European Cups ==
Sutjeska played five seasons in the EHF European competitions:

2007/08 – EHF Cup

2008/09 – EHF Cup Winners' Cup

2009/10 – EHF Cup

2011/12 – EHF Cup

2012/13 – EHF Challenge Cup

=== Matches ===
Season	Competition	Round	Opponent	Score
2007/08	EHF Cup	1/16	(Bosnia and Herzegovina) Bosna Visoko	21:21, 27:38
2008/09	EHF Cup Winners' Cup	1/32	(Belgium) United Tongeren	22:20, 22:23
2008/09	EHF Cup Winners' Cup	1/16	(Ukraine) Budivelnyk Kyiv	20:21, 17:30
2009/10	EHF Cup	1/32	(Luxembourg) Handball Esch	23:23, 26:32
2011/12	EHF Cup	1/32	(Kosovo) Kastrioti	30:27, 35:25
2011/12	EHF Cup	1/16	(Croatia) Nexe Našice	21:29, 25:30
2012/13	EHF Challenge Cup	1/32	(Belgium) Initia Hasselt	18:30, 16:23

== Famous players ==
- (Montenegro) Rade Mijatović
- (Serbia) Ivan Nikčević
- (Montenegro) Alen Muratović
- (Montenegro) Goran Đukanović
- (Montenegro) Marko Lasica
