= RK Berane =

Handball club from Berane, Montenegro

- Full name: Rukometni klub Berane
- Short name: Berane
- Founded: 1949
- Arena: Hala sportova
- Capacity: 3,000 seats
- League: Montenegrin First Handball League
- 2024–25: 6th
| Home | Away |

Rukometni klub Berane is a handball club from Berane, Montenegro. RK Berane is former champion of Montenegro.

== History ==
RK Berane was formed in 1949, under the name ORK Ivangrad. For the first time in history, Berane gained promotion to the First League at the 1995, under the name Raj Banka. During the start of the 21st century, Berane became permanent member of the First League of Serbia and Montenegro.

After the Montenegrin independence, Berane played in the Montenegrin First League. Their biggest success was the title of national championship in the season 2007/08. A year earlier, RK Berane became the winner of the first season of Montenegrin Cup.

Due to financial problems and the destruction of their stadium in February 2012, Berane was relegated from the First League after the season 2012/13. After that, club is transformed and started with competing in the Second Montenegrin League 2013/14.

== Trophies ==
- Champion of Montenegro (1)
  - 2007/08
- Winner of the Montenegrin Cup (1)
  - 2006/07

== First League seasons ==
In the era of FR Yugoslavia/Serbia and Montenegro, RK Berane participated in the First League during the eight seasons: 1995/96, 1999/00, 2000/01, 2001/02, 2002/03, 2003/04, 2004/05, 2005/06.

After the Montenegrin independence, Berane played in the Montenegrin First League during the seasons 2006/07, 2007/08, 2008/09, 2009/10, 2010/11, 2011/12, 2012/13, 2014/15.

== European Cups ==
Berane played few seasons in the EHF European competitions:

- 2006/07 - EHF Challenge Cup
- 2007/08 - EHF Cup Winners' Cup
- 2008/09 - EHF Cup
- 2009/10 - EHF Challenge Cup

=== Matches ===
| Season | Competition | Round | Opponent | Score |
|---|---|---|---|---|
| 2006/07 | EHF Challenge Cup | Qual | (Moldova) INFIS-Ols Chisinau | 36:21 |
| 2006/07 | EHF Challenge Cup | Qual | (England) London GD | 37:23 |
| 2006/07 | EHF Challenge Cup | Qual | (Greece) GAC Kilkis | 29:28 |
| 2006/07 | EHF Challenge Cup | 1/16 | (Montenegro) Lovćen Cetinje | 23:20, 19:26 |
| 2007/08 | EHF Cup Winners' Cup | 1/32 | (Luxembourg) Berchem | 28:27, 28:23 |
| 2007/08 | EHF Cup Winners' Cup | 1/16 | (Denmark) KIF Kolding | 23:37, 28:47 |
| 2008/09 | EHF Cup | 1/32 | (Portugal) Os Belenenses | 36:32, 22:31 |
| 2009/10 | EHF Challenge Cup | Qual | (North Macedonia) Tineks Prolet | 29:22 |
| 2009/10 | EHF Challenge Cup | Qual | (England) Olympia London | 44:30 |
| 2009/10 | EHF Challenge Cup | Qual | (Portugal) Xico Andebol | 22:26 |
| 2009/10 | EHF Challenge Cup | 1/32 | (Greece) AO Dimou | 30:27, 25:33 |

== Famous players ==
- (Montenegro) Marko Rajković
- (Serbia) Darko Stanić
- (Serbia) Alem Toskić
- (Montenegro) Vesko Obradović
- (Serbia) Mijajlo Marsenić
