= RK Rudar Pljevlja =

Montenegrin handball club

- Full name: Rukometni klub Rudar Pljevlja
- Nickname: Rudari (Miners)
- Founded: 1957
- Arena: Ada Sports Center; Pljevlja, Montenegro
- Capacity: 3,000
- League: Montenegrin First Handball League
- Club colours
Home	Away

Rukometni klub Rudar is a Montenegrin handball club from Pljevlja, that plays in Montenegrin First Handball League.

== History ==
Formed in 1957, RK Rudar was one of the leading Montenegrin handball clubs in SFR Yugoslavia. It was the first Montenegrin handball club which participated in Yugoslav First League, during the season 1964/65.

After the breakup of SFR Yugoslavia, RK Rudar was renamed into RK Pljevlja and during the decade played in the Second League - 'West'. Because in Pljevlja didn't exist a big sports hall, club played their home games in Podgorica, Nikšić, Berane, Tivat, Priboj or Užice.

At the start of 21st century, in 2001, in Pljevlja was built Sports hall Ada, with capacity of 3,000 seats. At the same year, after almost four decades, RK Pljevlja made their second promotion in the First Yugoslav League. In that competitions, club spent four next seasons.

Following the Montenegrin independence, Pljevlja played one season in the Montenegrin First League. After the relegation and one season spent in Second Handball League, the club was back in the First League, under the old name - RK Rudar.

== First League seasons ==
In the SFR Yugoslavia and FR Yugoslavia/Serbia and Montenegro, RK Rudar participated in the First League during the eight seasons: 1964/65, 2001/02, 2002/03, 2003/04, 2004/05.

After the Montenegrin independence, Rudar played in the Montenegrin First League during the seasons 2006/07, 2008/09, 2009/10, 2010/11, 2011/12, 2014/15.

== European Cups ==
Rudar played one season in the EHF European competitions:

2010/11 - EHF Challenge Cup

=== Matches ===
Season	Competition	Round	Opponent	Score
2010/11	EHF Challenge Cup	1/32	(Montenegro) Budvanska rivijera Budva	26:19, 34:24
		1/16	(Romania) Știința Bacău	22:31, 15:40

== Famous players ==
- (Montenegro) Nedim Selmanovic
- (Serbia and Montenegro) Nenad Peruničić
- (Serbia and Montenegro) Predrag Peruničić
- (Montenegro) Almir Mlatišuma
- (Montenegro) Boban Knežević
- (Serbia) Goran Cmiljanić
- (Montenegro) Radan Rovčanin
- (Montenegro) Nemanja Grbović
- Nikola Grujicic
- Nemanja Grujicic
- Vladan Anicic
- Slavisa Lacmanovic
- Goran Andjelic
- (Montenegro) Denijal Lukas
- (Montenegro) Nemanja Matovic
- (Serbia) Nemanja Vojinovic
- (Montenegro) Filip Milovic
- (Montenegro) Mile Cuzovic
