= RK Mojkovac =

Montenegrin handball club

RK Brskovo
- Full name: Rukometni klub Brskovo Mojkovac
- Founded: 1965
- Arena: ŠC Vuksan Đukić; Mojkovac, Montenegro
- Capacity: 1,500
- League: Montenegrin First League
- Club colours
Home	Away

Rukometni klub Brskovo is a Montenegrin handball club from Mojkovac, that plays in Montenegrin First League. RK Mojkovac is former champion of Montenegro.

== History ==
The club was formed during the 60's as RK Brskovo. In SFR Yugoslavia, Brskovo played mostly in the Montenegrin Republic League, with few seasons in the Second League - 'West'. After the breakup of SFR Yugoslavia, Brskovo became the participant of the First Handball League of FR Yugoslavia, but only for one season - 1992/93. In the next years, the club participated in the Second League, but with the 21st century it was relegated, and in 2004 completely dissolved.

The re-formation of the club, under the name RK Mojkovac, started with the Montenegrin independence. Mojkovac became a member of Montenegrin First League at 2006, and in next year, club gained first promotion to the European cups. Hard days for Mojkovac came during the 2008. At the end of the season 2007/08, the club was relegated into the Second League.

In their returning First League season (2010/11), RK Mojkovac won their first title as the champion of Montenegro. In the next seasons, Mojkovac was among the better members of the First League.

== Trophies ==
- Champion of Montenegro (1)
  - 2011.

== First League seasons ==
In the era of FR Yugoslavia, RK Mojkovac (then RK Brskovo) participated in the First League during the season 1992/93.

RK Mojkovac played in the Montenegrin First League during the seasons 2006/07, 2007/08, 2008/09, 2010/11, 2011/12, 2012/13, 2013/14, 2014/15.

== European Cups ==
Mojkovac played three seasons in the EHF European competitions:

2007/08 - EHF Challenge Cup

2011/12 - EHF Cup

2012/13 - EHF Cup

=== Teams ===
Season	Competition	Round	Opponent	Score
2007/08	EHF Challenge Cup	1/32	(Portugal) SL Benfica Lisbon	22:46, 26:44
2011/12	EHF Cup	1/32	(Serbia) Crvena zvezda Beograd	24:23, 21:23
2012/13	EHF Cup	1/32	(Iceland) Haukar Hafnarfjördur	19:25, 12:32

== Notable players ==
- (Montenegro) Žarko Pejović
- (Serbia) Darko Stanić
- (Montenegro) Saša Adžić
- (Montenegro) Anđelko Adžić
- (Serbia) Željko Jaćimović
- (Serbia) Borislav Ljubojević
