= RK Budućnost Podgorica =

- Full name: Rukometni klub Budućnost Podgorica
- Nickname: Ðetići
- Founded: 1949; 77 years ago, refounded in 2019
- Dissolved: 2010; 16 years ago
- Arena: Morača Sports Center; Podgorica, Montenegro
- Capacity: 4.500
Home	Away

RK Budućnost (Cyrillic: PК Будућност) is a handball club from Podgorica, Montenegro, which was champion of Montenegro for the two times. It is a part of Budućnost sport society.

== History ==
During the most of their history, Budućnost played in the Second Yugoslav League. In the shadow of successful Women's handball team Budućnost, they played only two seasons in the First League during the SFR Yugoslavia and FR Yugoslavia era.

Successful period in the Budućnost history started after the Montenegrin independence. Budućnost became champion of the Second League 2006/07 and gets promotion to the First League.

With a lot of new players from the whole region, Budućnost won their first trophy of Montenegrin champion at the season 2008/09. Same success, club from Podgorica made one year later. They participated in qualifiers for the EHF Champions League, but after 2010 and a financial collapse, RK Budućnost was dissolved.

In the season 2019–20, RK Budućnost was reactivated.

== Team ==
=== Current squad ===
Squad for the 2026–27 season

Goalkeepers
Left Wingers
Right Wingers
Line players

Left Backs
Central Backs
Right Backs

- (Serbia) Savo Slavujlica

=== Transfers ===
Transfers for the 2026–27 season

Joining

- (Serbia) Savo Slavujlica (RB) from (Slovakia) HT Tatran Prešov

Leaving

== Trophies ==
- Champion of Montenegro (2)
  - 2009, 2010.

== First League seasons ==
In the SFR Yugoslavia and FR Yugoslavia/Serbia and Montenegro, RK Budućnost participated in the First League during the three seasons: 1990/91, 1991/92, 2000/01.

After the Montenegrin independence, Budućnost played in the Montenegrin First League during the seasons 2007/08, 2008/09, 2009/10.

== European Cups ==
Budućnost played two seasons in the EHF European competitions:

2008/09 - EHF Challenge Cup

2009/10 - EHF Champions League / EHF Cup

=== Matches ===
Season	Competition	Round	Opponent	Score
2008/09	EHF Challenge Cup	Qual	(England) Manchester	39:11
2008/09	EHF Challenge Cup	Qual	(Sweden) LIF Lindesberg	34:30
2008/09	EHF Challenge Cup	Qual	(Croatia) Karlovac	28:28
2008/09	EHF Challenge Cup	1/16	(Bosnia and Herzegovina) Sloga Doboj	37:19, 32:22
2008/09	EHF Challenge Cup	1/16	(Portugal) Maritimo da Madeira	30:26, 31:28
2008/09	EHF Challenge Cup	1/8	(Turkey) Beşiktaş Istanbul	27:25, 23:26
2009/10	EHF Champions League	Qual	(Belarus) Dinamo Minsk	27:35
2009/10	EHF Champions League	Qual	(North Macedonia) Vardar Skopje	28:35
2009/10	EHF Champions League	Qual	(Turkey) Beşiktaş Istanbul	31:28
2009/10	EHF Cup	1/32	(Bosnia and Herzegovina) Borac Banja Luka	36:30, 29:33
2009/10	EHF Cup	1/16	(Germany) TBV Lemgo	28:28, 23:46

== Famous players ==
- (Montenegro) Alen Muratović
- (Montenegro) Blažo Lisičić
- (Montenegro) Nenad Peruničić
- (Montenegro) Marko Rajković
- (Montenegro) Igor Marković
- (Ukraine) Victor Kovalenko
- (Montenegro) Igor Bakić
- (Montenegro) Nemanja Grbović
- (Montenegro) Žarko Marković
- (Montenegro) Marko Lasica
- (Montenegro) Rade Mijatović
- (Montenegro) Mirko Milašević
- (Montenegro) Žarko Pejović
- (Montenegro) Goran Đukanović
- (Moldova) Alexandru Cioban
- (Russia) Valeriy Myagkov
- (Montenegro) Mirko Anđić
- (Montenegro) Petar Koćalo
- (Montenegro) Danijel Vukićević
- (Serbia) Mladen Ivanović
- (Serbia) Zoran Mihailović
- (Serbia) Ivan Rajičević
- (Serbia) Dragoslav Stojiljković

== See also ==
- SD Budućnost Podgorica
