= RK Lovćen =

Montenegrin handball club

- Full name: Rukometni klub Lovćen
- Short name: Lovćen
- Founded: 1949
- Arena: SRC Lovćen, Cetinje
- Capacity: 1,500
- Head coach: Filip Popović
- League: First Handball League; Regional League
- 2025–26: 1st
- Club colours
Home	Away

Rukometni klub Lovćen is a Montenegrin handball club from Old Royal Capital Cetinje, that plays in the Montenegrin First League and the Regional League.

For decades, Lovćen has been the most successful Montenegrin men's handball club and the only team from Montenegro which won men's handball trophies in the Yugoslav era. During the 2001 and 2002, Lovćen played in the EHF Champions League.

== History ==
Formed at 1949, Lovćen is among oldest handball clubs in Montenegro. During the decades, especially from 80's until today, Lovćen became most successful Montenegrin men's handball club, but the most trophied team from Old Royal Capital Cetinje. There is huge number of great Montenegrin, Yugoslav and European players which produced handball school of Lovćen. During the decades, Lovćen became most important base of Montenegro men's national handball team players.

First biggest success, Lovćen made during the start of 80's, when they became permanent member of Yugoslav Second League. In the second half of the same decade, Lovćen won the trophy of Second League champion and became first Montenegrin men's handball club which gained promotion to the First League of SFR Yugoslavia.

=== First seasons in the First league ===
First match in First league of SFR Yugoslavia, Lovćen played in October 1988 against RK Jugović away and won with result 23:20. Their first season in strongest domestic competition, Lovćen finished in sixth place. After three successful years in the SFR Yugoslavia, and the matches against great names of European handball like Zagreb Hromos, Metaloplastika Šabac or RK Borac Banja Luka, Lovćen was relegated at the end of season 1990/94.

At the season 1994/95, Lovćen returned to the First League of FR Yugoslavia and in the next years made notable results. With the second place at the end of season 1996/96, Lovćen get promotion to their first European competition - EHF Cup 1997/98. In the next two seasons, team was placed on the top positions of Yugoslav First League, with placements at the Quarterfinals of the EHF Cities Cup and EHF Cup.

=== Trophies in the FR Yugoslavia ===
One of the glory days in the club history was 17 May 2000. On that day, Lovćen won their first champions title in the First League. With the four points more than Sintelon Bačka Palanka, Lovćen provided their first appearance in the EHF Champions League.

Season 2000/01 was the most successful in the club history. At the EHF Champions League 2000/01 Lovćen finished as first team in the Group 'D' and played in the Quarterfinals. On that season, fans at Cetinje watched Lovćen games against great European clubs like THW Kiel or Portland San Antonio. At the same period, Lovćen won another one title in the First Yugoslav League, with two points more than Partizan Belgrade. On 8 November 2000, Lovćen recorded their biggest win in the Yugoslav League - against Vojvodina Novi Sad at Cetinje - 43:17.

EHF Champions League 2000/01 - Group D

Team	Pld	W	D	L	GF	GA	GD	Pts
(Federal Republic of Yugoslavia) Lovćen Cetinje	6	4	1	1	160	150	+10	9
(Spain) SDC San Antonio	6	4	0	2	170	155	+15	8
(Norway) IL Runar Sandefjord	6	2	0	4	151	165	−14	4
(Czech Republic) Banik Karvina	6	1	1	4	170	181	−11	3

At the 2001/02 season, Lovćen again participated in the EHF Champions League, but finished domestic season at the second place, after three dramatic play-off finals against Partizan Belgrade (24:23, 24:25, 24:25). During that season, Lovćen won their first trophy on the Yugoslav Cup - in the final match, in Vršac, club from Cetinje defeated Sintelon Bačka Palanka - 19:18.

Next year, Lovćen repeated their success in the Cup of Yugoslavia and that was the last club's trophy during the FR Yugoslavia era. In the next seasons, Lovćen stayed in the top of domestic league, with permanent appearances in the European cups.

=== Montenegrin independence ===
Following the Montenegrin independence, national handball association of Montenegro established their own First League and Cup Competition. Lovćen became the first champion of independent Montenegro in the season 2006/07, after 20 matches - 18 wins, 1 draw, 1 loss.

In the next years, Lovćen became weaker in the domestic championship. During the period from 2007 to 2011, Lovćen didn't won any First League title, but they triumphed in the Cup seasons 2009, 2010 and 2011. Finally, at the end of season 2011/12, Lovćen again became Champion of Montenegro, with new Cup title. Same success club made in the season 2012/13, with the best performance in Montenegrin men's handball - 21 match / 21 win (League and Cup). New doubles (league and cup winner) Lovćen made at seasons 2013/14 and 2014/15.

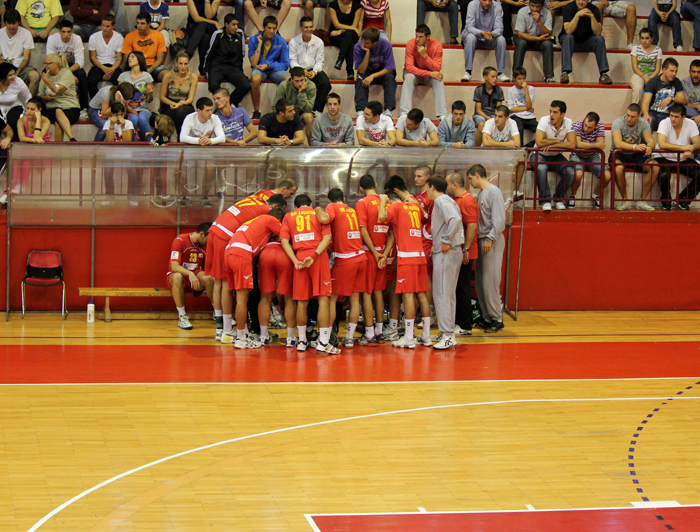
RK Lovćen player during the match against RK Vardar

== Honours and achievements ==
National Championships - 12

- Champion of FR Yugoslavia (2)
  - 2000, 2001.
- Champion of Montenegro (10)
  - 2007, 2012, 2013, 2014, 2015, 2018, 2019, 2020, 2021, 2023

National Cups - 14

- Winner of the FR Yugoslavia Cup (2)
  - 2002, 2003.
- Winner of the Montenegrin Cup (12)
  - 2009, 2010, 2011, 2012, 2013, 2014, 2015, 2017, 2018, 2020, 2021, 2022

European Cups

- EHF Champions League
  - 5th place - 2001.

== Team ==
=== Current squad ===
Squad for the 2023–24 season

Goalkeepers

- 1 (Montenegro) Zarija Lutovac
- 38 (Montenegro) Filip Borozan

Left wingers

- 7 (Montenegro) Danilo Pajović
- 77 (Montenegro) Aleksandar Mrvaljević

Right wingers

- 5 (Montenegro) Aleksa Perišić
- 13 (Montenegro) Mirko Radović

Line players

- 19 (Montenegro) Mihailo Šćekić
- 20 (Montenegro) Filip Božović
- 22 (Montenegro) Luka Vujović

Left Backs

- 4 (Montenegro) Miodrag Stanojević
- 9 (Montenegro) Milorad Bakić

Centre Backs

- 6 (Montenegro) Filip Krivokapić
- 23 (Montenegro) Bogdan Petričević

Right Backs

- 33 (Montenegro) Ivan Perišić

=== Transfers ===
Transfers for the 2025–26 season

Joining

- (Montenegro) Milan Popović (LW) from (Romania) Steaua București

Leaving

== Notable former players ==
- (Montenegro) Veselin Vujović
- (Montenegro) Pero Milošević
- (Montenegro) Goran Đukanović
- (Montenegro) Ratko Đurković
- (Montenegro) Petar Kapisoda
- (Serbia) (Hungary) Nenad Puljezević
- (Serbia) Igor Butulija
- (Montenegro) Stevo Nikočević
- (Montenegro) Goran Stojanović
- (Montenegro) Alen Muratović
- (Serbia) (Austria) Nikola Marinović
- (Montenegro) Predrag Peruničić
- (Montenegro) Draško Mrvaljević
- (Montenegro) Mladen Rakčević
- (Bosnia and Herzegovina) Dejan Unčanin
- (Montenegro) Marko Dobrković
- (Montenegro) Aleksandar Svitlica
- (Montenegro) Blažo Lisičić
- (Serbia) Dalibor Čutura
- (Montenegro) Igor Marković
- (Montenegro) Ivan Ražnatović
- (Montenegro) Vuk Milošević
- (Montenegro) Petar Vujanović
- (Montenegro) Ilija Ivanović
- (Montenegro) Stevan Vujović
- (Montenegro) Novica Rudović
- (Montenegro) Nebojša Stojinović
- (Montenegro) Nikola Vujović
- (Montenegro) Marko Dapčević
- (Serbia) Milan Vučićević
- (Montenegro) Brano Božović
- (Serbia) Radivoje Ristanović
- (Bosnia and Herzegovina) Goran Biljaka
- (Bosnia and Herzegovina) Mladen Čačić
- (Montenegro) Miodrag Ašanin
- (Montenegro) Andrija Pejović
- (Serbia) Ivan Šmigić
- (Montenegro) Marko Pejović
- (Montenegro) Danijel Vukićević
- (Montenegro) Goran Lasica
- (Serbia) Aleksandar Beljić
- (Montenegro) Vasko Ševaljević
- (Bosnia and Herzegovina) Muhamed Mustafić
- (Bosnia and Herzegovina) Selman Beširović
- (Montenegro) Blažo Popović
- (Montenegro) Vladan Lipovina
- (Montenegro) Danilo Mihaljević
- (Montenegro) Vuko Borozan
- (North Macedonia) Bojan Madzovski
- (Montenegro) Vuk Lakićević

== Notable coaches ==
- (Montenegro) Veselin Vujović
- (Montenegro) Pero Milošević
- (Montenegro) Branko Dumnić
- (Serbia) Ljubomir Obradović
- (Montenegro) Ranko Popović
- (Montenegro) Nikola Adžić

== See also ==
- RK Lovćen in the First League
- RK Lovćen in SEHA League
- SD Lovćen Cetinje
- Cetinje
