= 2021–22 Handball Championship of Bosnia and Herzegovina =

Handball league season

Handball Championship of Bosnia and Herzegovina
- Season: 2021-22
- Champions: RK Borac m:tel (6th title) (Men); Grude (7th title) (Women)
- Relegated: Sloga, Bosna (Men); Leotar (Women)

The 2021–22 Handball Championship of Bosnia and Herzegovina was the 21st season of this championship, featuring teams from Bosnia and Herzegovina. Izviđač entered as the men's defending champions, while Borac held the title for the women's defending champions.

Borac emerged as the men's champion, while Grude claimed the women's title.

== Premier handball league for men ==
=== Competition format ===
Sixteen teams joined the regular season, played as double round robin tournament.

=== 2021-22 Season participants ===
The following 16 clubs compete in the Handball Premier League during the 2021–22 season.

Locations of the 2021–22 Handball Premier League of Bosnia and Herzegovina teams

Team	City	Arena
Izviđač	Ljubuški	Sports Hall Ljubuški
Borac	Banja Luka	JUSC Borik
Bosna	Visoko	Sport Centre Mladost
MRK Sloga	Gornji Vakuf-Uskoplje	SD Gornji Vakuf
Gračanica	Gračanica	Sportska dvorana "Luke"
Konjuh	Živinice	Gradska Dvorana
Lokomotiva	Brčko	Dvorana Ekonomske skole
Sloboda	Tuzla	SKPC Mejdan
Maglaj	Maglaj	Gradska dvorana Pobjeda
Leotar	Trebinje	Sportska dvorana "Miloš Mrdić"
Sloga	Doboj	Dvorana Srednjoškolskog Centra Doboj
Vogošća	Vogošća	Sportska Dvorana Amel Bečković
Krivaja	Zavidovići	
Iskra	Bugojno	Kulturno-sportski centar Bugojno
Bosna	Sarajevo	Skenderija
Gradačac	Gradačac	

== Premier handball league for women ==
=== Competition format ===
Twelve teams joined the regular season, played as double round robin tournament.

=== 2021-22 Season participants ===
The following 12 clubs compete in the Handball Premier League during the 2021–22 season.

Locations of the 2021–22 Handball Premier League of Bosnia and Herzegovina teams

Team	City	Arena
Zrinjski	Mostar	Bijeli Brijeg Hall
Katarina	Mostar	Bijeli Brijeg Hall
Grude	Grude	Dvorana Bili Brig Grude
Izviđač	Ljubuški	Sports Hall Ljubuški
Borac	Banja Luka	JUSC Borik
Ilidža	Ilidža	KSIRC Hadzici
Krivaja	Zavidovići	Sportska dvorana "Luke"
Hadžići	Hadžići	Gradska Dvorana
Jedinstvo	Brčko	Dvorana Ekonomske skole
Mira	Prijedor	Hall Mladost
Knežopoljka	Kozarska Dubica	
Dubica	Kozarska Dubica	Sportska dvorana Kozarska Dubica
