= 2019–20 Handball Championship of Bosnia and Herzegovina =

Handball Championship of Bosnia and Herzegovina
- Season: 2019–20
- Champions: RK Borac m:tel (5th title) (Men); HŽRK Grude (6th title) (Women)
- Relegated: Goražde, Iskra, Drina (Men); Jedinstvo, Dubica (Women)

The 2019–20 Handball Championship of Bosnia and Herzegovina was the 19th season of this championship, with teams from Bosnia and Herzegovina participating in it. HRK Izviđač were the men's defending champions, and HŽRK Grude were the women's defending champions.

By the decision of the Handball Federation, the season ended on June 1, 2020, after the calendar scheduled for the season expired, because of the interruption of the competition caused by the coronavirus pandemic.

The ranking was determined after 18 rounds (13 for women) played before the competition was stopped.

RK Borac m:tel won the men's title, HŽRK Grude won the women's title.

== Premier handball league for men ==
=== Competition format ===
Sixteen teams joined the regular season, played as double round robin tournament.

=== 2019–20 Season participants ===
The following 16 clubs competed in the Handball Premier League during the 2019–20 season.

Locations of the 2019–20 Handball Premier League of Bosnia and Herzegovina teams

Team	City	Arena
Izviđač	Ljubuški	Sports Hall Ljubuški
Borac	Banja Luka	JUSC Borik
Bosna Visoko	Visoko	Sport Centre Mladost
MRK Sloga	Gornji Vakuf-Uskoplje	SD Gornji Vakuf
Slavija	Istočno Sarajevo	Sportska Dvorana Slavija
Gračanica	Gračanica	Sportska dvorana "Luke"
Konjuh	Živinice	Gradska Dvorana
Lokomotiva	Brčko	Dvorana Ekonomske skole
Sloboda	Tuzla	SKPC Mejdan
Maglaj	Maglaj	Gradska dvorana Pobjeda
Leotar	Trebinje	Sportska dvorana "Miloš Mrdić"
Sloga	Doboj	Dvorana Srednjoškolskog Centra Doboj
Vogošća	Vogošća	Sportska Dvorana Amel Bečković
Iskra	Bugojno	Kulturno-sportski centar Bugojno
Drina	Zvornik	Sportski centar Zvornik
Goražde	Goražde	Dvorana Mirsad Hurić

=== Standings ===
Pos	Team	Pld	W	D	L	GF	GA	GD	Pts
1	Borac (C)	18	15	1	2	521	446	+75	31
2	RK Gračanica	18	14	0	4	495	414	+81	28
3	RK Bosna Visoko	18	10	3	5	549	491	+58	23
4	MRK Sloga Gornji Vakuf - Uskoplje	18	10	2	6	497	463	+34	22
5	Izviđač	18	10	2	6	500	467	+33	22
6	Sloga Doboj	18	7	7	4	520	507	+13	21
7	RK Slavija	18	8	3	7	452	453	−1	19
8	RK Sloboda	18	8	1	9	522	490	+32	17
9	RK Lokomotiva Brčko	18	7	4	7	555	554	+1	18
10	RK Maglaj	18	8	1	9	493	501	−8	17
11	RK Leotar	18	7	2	9	473	482	−9	16
12	RK Konjuh	18	6	3	9	511	520	−9	15
13	RK Vogošća	18	6	1	11	438	469	−31	13
14	RK Goražde (R)	18	6	0	12	494	581	−87	12
15	RK Iskra (R)	18	5	2	11	503	556	−53	12
16	RK Drina (R)	18	1	0	17	460	589	−129	2

Updated to match(es) played on March 7, 2020. Source: Handball Federation of BiH
(C) Champions; (R) Relegated

=== Clubs in European competitions ===
Team	Competition	Progress
RK Borac m:tel	EHF European Cup	Round 1
RK Gračanica	EHF European Cup	Round 3

== Premier handball league for women ==
=== Competition format ===
Twelve teams joined the regular season, played as double round robin tournament.

=== 2019–20 Season participants ===
The following 12 clubs competed in the Handball Premier League during the 2019–20 season.

Locations of the 2019–20 Handball Premier League of Bosnia and Herzegovina teams

Team	City	Arena
Zrinjski	Mostar	Bijeli Brijeg Hall
Katarina	Mostar	Bijeli Brijeg Hall
Grude	Grude	Dvorana Bili Brig Grude
Izviđač	Ljubuški	Sports Hall Ljubuški
Borac	Banja Luka	JUSC Borik
Goražde	Goražde	Dvorana Mirsad Hurić
Krivaja	Zavidovići	Sportska dvorana "Luke"
Hadžići	Hadžići	Gradska Dvorana
Jedinstvo Brčko	Brčko	Dvorana Ekonomske skole
Jedinstvo Tuzla	Tuzla	SKPC Mejdan
Mira	Prijedor	Hall Mladost
Dubica	Kozarska Dubica	Sportska dvorana Kozarska Dubica

=== Standings ===
Pos	Team	Pld	W	D	L	GF	GA	GD	Pts
1	Grude (C)	13	12	0	1	0	0	0	24
2	Izviđač	13	11	0	2	0	0	0	22
3	Krivaja	13	10	0	3	0	0	0	20
4	Hadžići	13	10	0	3	0	0	0	20
5	Mira	13	8	0	5	0	0	0	16
6	Borac	13	7	0	6	0	0	0	14
7	Jedinstvo Brčko	13	7	0	6	0	0	0	14
8	Goražde	13	6	0	7	0	0	0	12
9	Katarina	13	3	0	10	0	0	0	6
10	Dubica (R)	13	2	1	10	0	0	0	5
11	Zrinjski	13	1	1	11	0	0	0	3
12	Jedinstvo Tuzla (R)	13	0	0	13	0	0	0	0

Updated to match(es) played on March 7, 2020. Source: Handball Federation of BiH
(C) Champions; (R) Relegated
