= List of indoor arenas in Bosnia and Herzegovina =

The following is a list of indoor arenas in Bosnia and Herzegovina, ordered by capacity. The venues are by their final capacity after construction for seating-only events. There is more capacity if standing room is included (e.g. for concerts).

== Current arenas ==
Image	Stadium	Capacity	City	Team	Inaugurated
	Juan Antonio Samaranch; Olympic Hall	12,000	Sarajevo	KK Bosna	1983
	Arena Zenica	6,200	Zenica	KK Čelik; RK Čelik	2009
	Mirza Delibašić Hall	5,616	Sarajevo	KK Bosna Royal; RK Bosna Sarajevo	1969
	Mejdan Hall	5,000	Tuzla	KK Sloboda Tuzla; RK Sloboda Tuzla	1984
	Pecara Hall	4,500	Široki Brijeg	HKK Široki	
	KSC Bugojno	4,200	Bugojno	KK Iskra; RK Iskra	1983
	Ljubuški Sports Hall	4,000	Ljubuški	HRK Izviđač	1998
	Borik Sports Hall	3,500	Banja Luka	RK Borac Banja Luka; KK Borac Banja Luka	1974
	Laktaši Sports Hall	3,000	Laktaši	KK Igokea	2010
	PKSC Bazen	2,500	Gračanica	RK Gračanica, Bosnia and Herzegovina national handball team	2024
	KSC Mladost	2,500	Visoko	RK Bosna Visoko	1986
	Mirsad Hurić Hall	1,600	Goražde	MRK Goražde	
	Ramiz Salčin Hall	1,299	Sarajevo	RK Bosna Sarajevo	2007

== See also ==
- List of indoor arenas in Europe
- List of indoor arenas by capacity
