= Faruk Halilbegović =

Bosnian footballer (born 1987)

Personal information
- Born: 7 September 1987 (age 39) Sarajevo, Bosnia and Herzegovina
- Height: 1.97 m (6 ft 5 1/2 in)

Sport
- Sport: Handball
- Position: Left back
- Current club: RK BOSNA VISOKO
- Number: 13
National team
Years	Team	Apps	(Gls)
2007-2014	Bosnia and Herzegovina	32	(33)
- Updated on 23.1.2015.

Faruk Halilbegović (born 7 September 1987 in Sarajevo, Bosnia and Herzegovina) is a handball left back who plays for German club HF Springe. He started his career in Bosna Visoko and later played for Borac Banja Luka, Bosna Sarajevo and Sloga Doboj. With Sloga he won the title of Bosnian league for season 2011–2012. After that he played for Al-Gharafa in Qatar and TV Emsdetten in Germany. After TV Emsdetten was relegated from Handball-Bundesliga, Halilbegović signed for HF Springe in July 2015.

== Honours ==
=== Club ===
- Handball Championship of Bosnia and Herzegovina:
  - Winner: 2011-2012
