= 2020–21 Handball Championship of Bosnia and Herzegovina =

20th season : men's and women's

Handball Championship of Bosnia and Herzegovina
- Season: 2020-21
- Champions: Izviđač (8th title) (Men); Borac (7th title) (Women)
- Relegated: Derventa, Slavija (Men); Goražde (Women)

The 2020–21 Handball Championship of Bosnia and Herzegovina was the 20th season of this championship, with teams from Bosnia and Herzegovina participating in it. RK Borac Banja Luka were the men's defending champions, and HŽRK Grude were the women's defending champions.

RK Izviđač won the men's title, ŽRK Borac won the women's title.

== Premier handball league for men ==
=== Competition format ===
Sixteen teams joined the regular season, played as double round robin tournament.

=== 2020-21 Season participants ===
The following 16 clubs compete in the Handball Premier League during the 2020-21 season.

Locations of the 2020–21 Handball Premier League of Bosnia and Herzegovina teams

Team	City	Arena
Izviđač	Ljubuški	Sports Hall Ljubuški
Borac	Banja Luka	JUSC Borik
Bosna Visoko	Visoko	Sport Centre Mladost
MRK Sloga	Gornji Vakuf-Uskoplje	SD Gornji Vakuf
Slavija	Istočno Sarajevo	Sportska Dvorana Slavija
Derventa	Derventa	
Gračanica	Gračanica	Sportska dvorana "Luke"
Konjuh	Živinice	Gradska Dvorana
Lokomotiva	Brčko	Dvorana Ekonomske skole
Sloboda	Tuzla	SKPC Mejdan
Maglaj	Maglaj	Gradska dvorana Pobjeda
Leotar	Trebinje	Sportska dvorana "Miloš Mrdić"
Sloga	Doboj	Dvorana Srednjoškolskog Centra Doboj
Vogošća	Vogošća	Sportska Dvorana Amel Bečković
Krivaja	Zavidovići	
Iskra	Bugojno	Kulturno-sportski centar Bugojno

=== Standings ===
Pos	Team	Pld	W	D	L	GF	GA	GD	Pts	
1	Izviđač (C)	30	24	3	3	892	733	+159	51	
2	Borac	30	24	1	5	871	698	+173	49	
3	Sloga Doboj	30	20	3	7	946	802	+144	43	
4	RK Sloboda	30	20	2	8	858	736	+122	42	
5	RK Vogošća	30	19	1	10	852	776	+76	39	
6	RK Gračanica	30	17	4	9	831	725	+106	38	
7	RK Konjuh	30	17	3	10	868	798	+70	37	
8	RK Krivaja	30	16	1	13	901	876	+25	33	
9	MRK Sloga Gornji Vakuf - Uskoplje	30	15	0	15	770	758	+12	30	
10	RK Leotar	30	14	1	15	798	802	−4	29	
11	RK Maglaj	30	12	1	17	837	923	−86	25	
12	RK Iskra	30	11	1	18	814	879	−65	23	
13	RK Bosna Visoko	30	9	0	21	807	819	−12	18	
14	RK Lokomotiva Brčko	30	7	1	22	803	1023	−220	15	
15	RK Derventa (R)	30	2	0	28	771	1009	−238	4	Relegation to lower division
16	RK Slavija (Note: Slavija: -3 points (Handball Federation decision)) (R)	30	2	0	28	371	633	−262	1	Relegation to lower division

Updated to match(es) played on May 2. Source: Handball Federation of BiH
(C) Champions; (R) Relegated

=== Clubs in European competitions ===
Team	Competition	Progress
RK Borac m:tel	EHF European Cup	Last 16
RK Gračanica	EHF European Cup	Last 16
MRK Sloga Gornji Vakuf - Uskoplje	EHF European Cup	R2
HC Bosna Vispak Visoko	EHF European Cup	R2

== Premier handball league for women ==
=== Competition format ===
Eleven teams joined the regular season, played as double round robin tournament.

=== 2020-21 Season participants ===
The following 11 clubs compete in the Handball Premier League during the 2020-21 season.

Locations of the 2020–21 Handball Premier League of Bosnia and Herzegovina teams

Team	City	Arena
Zrinjski	Mostar	Bijeli Brijeg Hall
Katarina	Mostar	
Grude	Grude	Dvorana Bili Brig Grude
Izviđač	Ljubuški	Sports Hall Ljubuški
Borac	Banja Luka	JUSC Borik
Goražde	Goražde	Dvorana Mirsad Hurić
Krivaja	Zavidovići	Sportska dvorana "Luke"
Hadžići	Hadžići	Gradska Dvorana
Jedinstvo	Brčko	Dvorana Ekonomske skole
Mira	Prijedor	Hall Mladost
Knežopoljka	Kozarska Dubica	

=== Standings ===
Pos	Team	Pld	W	D	L	GF	GA	GD	Pts
1	ŽRK Borac (C)	20	17	1	2	0	0	0	35
2	ŽRK Hadžići	20	17	0	3	0	0	0	34
3	HŽRK Grude	20	16	0	4	0	0	0	32
4	ŽRK Krivaja	20	13	0	7	0	0	0	26
5	ŽRK Mira Prijedor	20	10	2	8	0	0	0	22
6	HŽRK Izviđač	20	9	1	10	0	0	0	19
7	RK Jedinstvo Brčko	20	9	1	10	0	0	0	19
8	ŽRK Knežopoljka Dubica	20	6	0	14	0	0	0	12
9	HŽRK Zrinjski Mostar	20	4	1	15	0	0	0	9
10	HRK Katarina	20	4	0	16	0	0	0	8
11	ŽRK Goražde (R)	20	2	0	18	0	0	0	4

Updated to match(es) played on May 2. Source: Handball Federation of BiH
(C) Champions; (R) Relegated

=== Clubs in European competitions ===
Team	Competition	Progress
HŽRK Grude	EHF European Cup	Last 16
