= 2020–21 EHF European Cup =

EHF European Cup
- 2020–21

Tournament information
- Sport: Handball
- Dates: 14 November 2020–30 May 2021
- Teams: 51 (qualification stage); 16 (main stage)
- Website: ehfec.com

Final positions
- Champions: (Greece) AEK Athens (1st title)
- Runner-up: (Sweden) Ystads IF

Tournament statistics
- Top scorer: Aleks Kavčič (45 goals)

The 2020–21 EHF European Cup was the 24th season of Europe's tertiary club handball tournament organised by European Handball Federation (EHF), and the 1st season since it was renamed from the Challenge Cup to the EHF European Cup.

== Qualified teams ==
The full list of teams qualified for each stage of the 2020–21 EHF European Cup was announced on 20 July 2020.

Round 3
(Romania) CS Minaur Baia Mare	(Greece) AEK Athens	(Russia) HC Neva SPb	(Norway) Drammen HK
(Iceland) FH	(Luxembourg) HC Berchem	(Bosnia and Herzegovina) Borac m:tel	(Czech Republic) HC Dukla Prague
(Israel) Holon Yuvalim	(Ukraine) Donbas Donetsk Region	(Slovakia) MŠK Považská Bystrica	(Turkey) Beykoz Belediyesi GSK
(Belarus) Masheka Mogilev
Round 2
(Finland) BK-46	(Lithuania) Dragūnas Klaipėda	(Serbia) Železničar 1949	(Sweden) Ystads IF
(Kosovo) KH Besa Famgas	(Bulgaria) HC Dobrudja	(Switzerland) TSV St. Otmar St. Gallen	(Austria) SC kelag Ferlach
(Cyprus) Parnassos Strovolou	(Latvia) ZRHK Tenax Dobele	(Moldova) PGU Kartina TV Tiraspol	(Italy) Cassano Magnago HC
(Slovenia) RK Gorenje Velenje	(Estonia) Põlva Serviti	(Romania) CSM București	(Greece) AC Diomidis Argous
(Iceland) Afturelding Mosfellsbear	(Bosnia and Herzegovina) RK Gračanica	(Czech Republic) TJ Sokol Nové Veselí	(Ukraine) Odesa
(Turkey) Spor Toto SK	(Finland) Cocks	(Lithuania) Vilnius VHC Sviesa	(Kosovo) KH Prishtina
(Austria) INSIGNIS HB Westwien	(Cyprus) Sabbianco A. Famagusta	(Italy) Raimond Sassari	(Estonia) HC Tallinn
(Bosnia and Herzegovina) HC Bosna Vispak Visoko	(Czech Republic) HC ROBE Zubří	(Turkey) Antalyaspor	(Finland) HIFK
(Lithuania) Granitas-Karys	(Italy) Ego Handball Siena	(Russia) SGAU-Saratov	(Norway) Kolstad Håndball
(Bosnia and Herzegovina) Sloga	(Czech Republic) HCB Karviná		

== Qualifying rounds ==
=== Round 2 ===
==== Seeding ====
A total of 38 teams were involved in Round 2. They were divided into three geographical zones, each one with two pots, to limit travel distances and to reduce possible travel restrictions amid the COVID-19 pandemic. The first leg matches were held on 14–15 November 2020, while the second leg matches were held on 21–22 November 2020. The draw was held in EHF office in Vienna.

Zone 1		Zone 2		Zone 3	
Pot 1	Pot 2	Pot 1	Pot 2	Pot 1	Pot 2
(Finland) BK-46; (Lithuania) Dragūnas Klaipėda; (Sweden) Ystads IF; (Latvia) ZRHK Tenax Dobele; (Estonia) Põlva Serviti; (Iceland) Afturelding Mosfellsbear	(Finland) Cocks; (Lithuania) Vilnius VHC Sviesa; (Estonia) HC Tallinn; (Finland) HIFK; (Lithuania) Granitas-Karys; (Norway) Kolstad Håndball	(Serbia) Železničar 1949; (Kosovo) KH Besa Famgas; (Bulgaria) HC Dobrudja; (Moldova) PGU Kartina TV Tiraspol; (Romania) CSM București; (Greece) AC Diomidis Argous; (Bosnia and Herzegovina) RK Gračanica	(Ukraine) Odesa; (Turkey) Spor Toto SK; (Kosovo) KH Prishtina; (Bosnia and Herzegovina) HC Bosna Vispak Visoko; (Turkey) Antalyaspor; (Russia) SGAU-Saratov; (Bosnia and Herzegovina) Sloga	(Switzerland) TSV St. Otmar St. Gallen; (Austria) SC kelag Ferlach; (Cyprus) Parnassos Strovolou; (Italy) Cassano Magnago HC; (Slovenia) RK Gorenje Velenje; (Czech Republic) TJ Sokol Nové Veselí	(Austria) INSIGNIS HB Westwien; (Cyprus) Sabbianco A. Famagusta; (Italy) Raimond Sassari; (Czech Republic) HC ROBE Zubří; (Italy) Ego Handball Siena; (Czech Republic) HCB Karviná

==== Matches ====
Results

Team 1	Agg.	Team 2	1st leg	2nd leg
Afturelding Mosfellsbear (Iceland)	Cancelled (Note: Due to COVID-19 travel restrictions, 11 teams automatically advanced to Round 3.)	(Lithuania) Granitas-Karys	Cancelled	Cancelled
ZRHK Tenax Dobele (Latvia)	Cancelled	(Finland) HIFK	Cancelled	Cancelled
Cocks (Finland)	72–50	(Lithuania) Dragūnas Klaipėda	33–24	39–26
Ystads IF (Sweden)	72–62	(Lithuania) Vilnius VHC Sviesa	36–33	36–29
BK-46 (Finland)	Cancelled	(Estonia) HC Tallinn	Cancelled	Cancelled
Põlva Serviti (Estonia)	Cancelled	(Norway) Kolstad Håndball	Cancelled	Cancelled
Spor Toto SK (Turkey)	Cancelled	(Serbia) Železničar 1949	Cancelled	Cancelled
AC Diomidis Argous (Greece)	Cancelled	(Turkey) Antalyaspor	Cancelled	Cancelled
PGU Kartina TV Tiraspol (Moldova)	Cancelled	(Russia) SGAU-Saratov	Cancelled	Cancelled
Sloga (Bosnia and Herzegovina)	38–61	(Romania) CSM București	23–30	15–31
Odesa (Ukraine)	52–54	(Bosnia and Herzegovina) RK Gračanica	22–28	30–26
KH Prishtina (Kosovo)	Cancelled	(Bulgaria) HC Dobrudja	Cancelled	Cancelled
HC Bosna Vispak Visoko (Bosnia and Herzegovina)	38–68	(Kosovo) KH Besa Famgas	18–36	20–32
Parnassos Strovolou (Cyprus)	56–53	(Italy) Raimond Sassari	29–25	27–28
RK Gorenje Velenje (Slovenia)	61–44	(Italy) Ego Handball Siena	32–20	29–24
TJ Sokol Nové Veselí (Czech Republic)	49–58	(Cyprus) Sabbianco A. Famagusta	28–32	21–26
HC ROBE Zubří (Czech Republic)	Cancelled	(Switzerland) TSV St. Otmar St. Gallen	Cancelled	Cancelled
INSIGNIS HB Westwien (Austria)	Cancelled	(Italy) Cassano Magnago HC	Cancelled	Cancelled
HCB Karviná (Czech Republic)	Cancelled	(Austria) SC kelag Ferlach	Cancelled	Cancelled

=== Round 3 ===
==== Seeding ====
A total of 32 teams were involved in the Round 3, 19 teams advancing from the previous round and 13 teams entering this round. Teams were divided into two zones, each one with two pots of 8 teams and were drawn without any restrictions. The first leg matches were held on 12–13 December 2020, while the second leg matches were held on 19–20 December 2020. The draw was held in EHF office in Vienna.

Zone 1		Zone 2	
Pot 1	Pot 2	Pot 1	Pot 2
(Russia) HC Neva SPb; (Norway) Drammen HK; (Iceland) FH; (Luxembourg) HC Berchem; (Czech Republic) HC Dukla Prague; (Slovakia) MŠK Považská Bystrica; (Estonia) HC Tallinn; (Finland) Cocks	(Sweden) Ystads IF; (Czech Republic) HC ROBE Zubří; (Austria) SC kelag Ferlach; (Latvia) ZRHK Tenax Dobele; (Austria) INSIGNIS HB Westwien; (Slovenia) RK Gorenje Velenje; (Estonia) Põlva Serviti; (Lithuania) Granitas-Karys	(Romania) CS Minaur Baia Mare; (Greece) AEK Athens; (Bosnia and Herzegovina) Borac m:tel; (Israel) Holon Yuvalim; (Ukraine) Donbas Donetsk Region; (Turkey) Beykoz Belediyesi GSK; (Belarus) Masheka Mogilev; (Turkey) Spor Toto SK	(Kosovo) KH Besa Famgas; (Kosovo) KH Prishtina; (Cyprus) Parnassos Strovolou; (Russia) SGAU-Saratov; (Romania) CSM București; (Turkey) Antalyaspor; (Bosnia and Herzegovina) RK Gračanica; (Cyprus) Sabbianco A. Famagusta

==== Matches ====
Results

Team 1	Agg.	Team 2	1st leg	2nd leg
Ystads IF (Sweden)	57–45	(Estonia) HC Tallinn	30–21	27–24
HC Neva SPb (Russia)	60–53	(Latvia) ZRHK Tenax Dobele	31–23	29–30
RK Gorenje Velenje (Slovenia)	62–52	(Finland) Cocks	30–25	32–27
HC Berchem (Luxembourg)	53–60	(Austria) INSIGNIS HB Westwien	24–28	29–32
SC kelag Ferlach (Austria)	Cancelled (Note: Due to COVID-19 travel restrictions, 4 teams automatically advanced to the Last 16.)	(Norway) Drammen HK	Cancelled	Cancelled
Põlva Serviti (Estonia)	54–40	(Czech Republic) HC Dukla Prague	37–18	17–22
FH (Iceland)	Cancelled	(Czech Republic) HC ROBE Zubří	Cancelled	Cancelled
Granitas-Karys (Lithuania)	50–53	(Slovakia) MŠK Považská Bystrica	22–25	28–28
Masheka Mogilev (Belarus)	56–61	(Russia) SGAU-Saratov	28–31	28–30
Spor Toto SK (Turkey)	55–71	(Romania) CSM București	27–33	28–38
Donbas Donetsk Region (Ukraine)	Cancelled	(Turkey) Antalyaspor	Cancelled	Cancelled
AEK Athens (Greece)	78–27	(Kosovo) KH Prishtina	37–19	41–8
RK Gračanica (Bosnia and Herzegovina)	Cancelled	(Israel) Holon Yuvalim	Cancelled	Cancelled
KH Besa Famgas (Kosovo)	44–45	(Bosnia and Herzegovina) Borac m:tel	24–22	20–23
Parnassos Strovolou (Cyprus)	49–57	(Romania) CS Minaur Baia Mare	25–28	24–29
Beykoz Belediyesi GSK (Turkey)	53–68	(Cyprus) Sabbianco A. Famagusta	28–32	25–36

== Last 16 ==
=== Seeding ===
Teams were divided in two pots of eight teams and were drawn without any country restrictions. The first leg matches were held on 13–14 February 2021, while the second leg matches were held on 20–21 February 2021. The draw was held in EHF office in Vienna.

Pot 1	Pot 2
(Austria) SC kelag Ferlach; (Austria) INSIGNIS HB Westwien; (Bosnia and Herzegovina) Borac m:tel; (Czech Republic) HC ROBE Zubří; (Estonia) Põlva Serviti; (Greece) AEK Athens; (Romania) CS Minaur Baia Mare; (Russia) HC Neva SPb	(Bosnia and Herzegovina) RK Gračanica; (Cyprus) Sabbianco A. Famagusta; (Romania) CSM București; (Russia) SGAU-Saratov; (Slovenia) RK Gorenje Velenje; (Slovakia) MŠK Považská Bystrica; (Sweden) Ystads IF; (Ukraine) Donbas Donetsk Region

=== Matches ===
Results

Team 1	Agg.	Team 2	1st leg	2nd leg
CSM București (Romania)	51–52	(Greece) AEK Athens	28–23	23–29
HC ROBE Zubří (Czech Republic)	52–50	(Slovakia) MŠK Považská Bystrica	29–22	23–28
SC kelag Ferlach (Austria)	52–54	(Cyprus) Sabbianco A. Famagusta	29–28	23–26
RK Gorenje Velenje (Slovenia)	64–44	(Bosnia and Herzegovina) Borac m:tel	32–28	32–16
INSIGNIS HB Westwien (Austria)	Cancelled (Note: Due to COVID-19, Ystads IF advanced to the Last 16.)	(Sweden) Ystads IF	Cancelled	Cancelled
SGAU-Saratov (Russia)	51–56	(Estonia) Põlva Serviti	28–28	23–28
Donbas Donetsk Region (Ukraine)	49–58	(Romania) CS Minaur Baia Mare	23–24	26–34
HC Neva SPb (Russia)	58–44	(Bosnia and Herzegovina) RK Gračanica	33–21	25–23

== Quarterfinals ==
The first leg matches were held on 20–21 March 2021, while the second leg matches were held on 27–28 March 2021. The draw was held in EHF office in Vienna.

Results

Team 1	Agg.	Team 2	1st leg	2nd leg
CS Minaur Baia Mare (Romania)	45–45 (a)	(Cyprus) Sabbianco A. Famagusta	22–27	23–18
HC Neva SPb (Russia)	48–59	(Greece) AEK Athens	21–30	27–29
HC ROBE Zubří (Czech Republic)	50–59	(Slovenia) RK Gorenje Velenje	26–31	24–28
Põlva Serviti (Estonia)	53–62	(Sweden) Ystads IF	28–33	25–29

== Semifinals ==
The first leg matches were held on 17 April 2021, while the second leg matches were held on 24 April 2021. The draw was held in EHF office in Vienna.

Results

Team 1	Agg.	Team 2	1st leg	2nd leg
Sabbianco A. Famagusta (Cyprus)	48–50	(Sweden) Ystads IF	26–24	22–26
AEK Athens (Greece)	62–60	(Slovenia) RK Gorenje Velenje	31–29	31–31

== Final ==
The first leg match was held on 28 May 2021, while the second leg match was held on 30 May 2021. The draw was held in EHF office in Vienna.

Results

Team 1	Agg.	Team 2	1st leg	2nd leg
AEK Athens (Greece)	54–46	(Sweden) Ystads IF	30–26	24–20

== See also ==
- 2020–21 EHF Champions League
- 2020–21 EHF European League
- 2020–21 Women's EHF Champions League
- 2020–21 Women's EHF European League
- 2020–21 Women's EHF European Cup
