= Luka Raković =

Croatian handball player (born 1988)

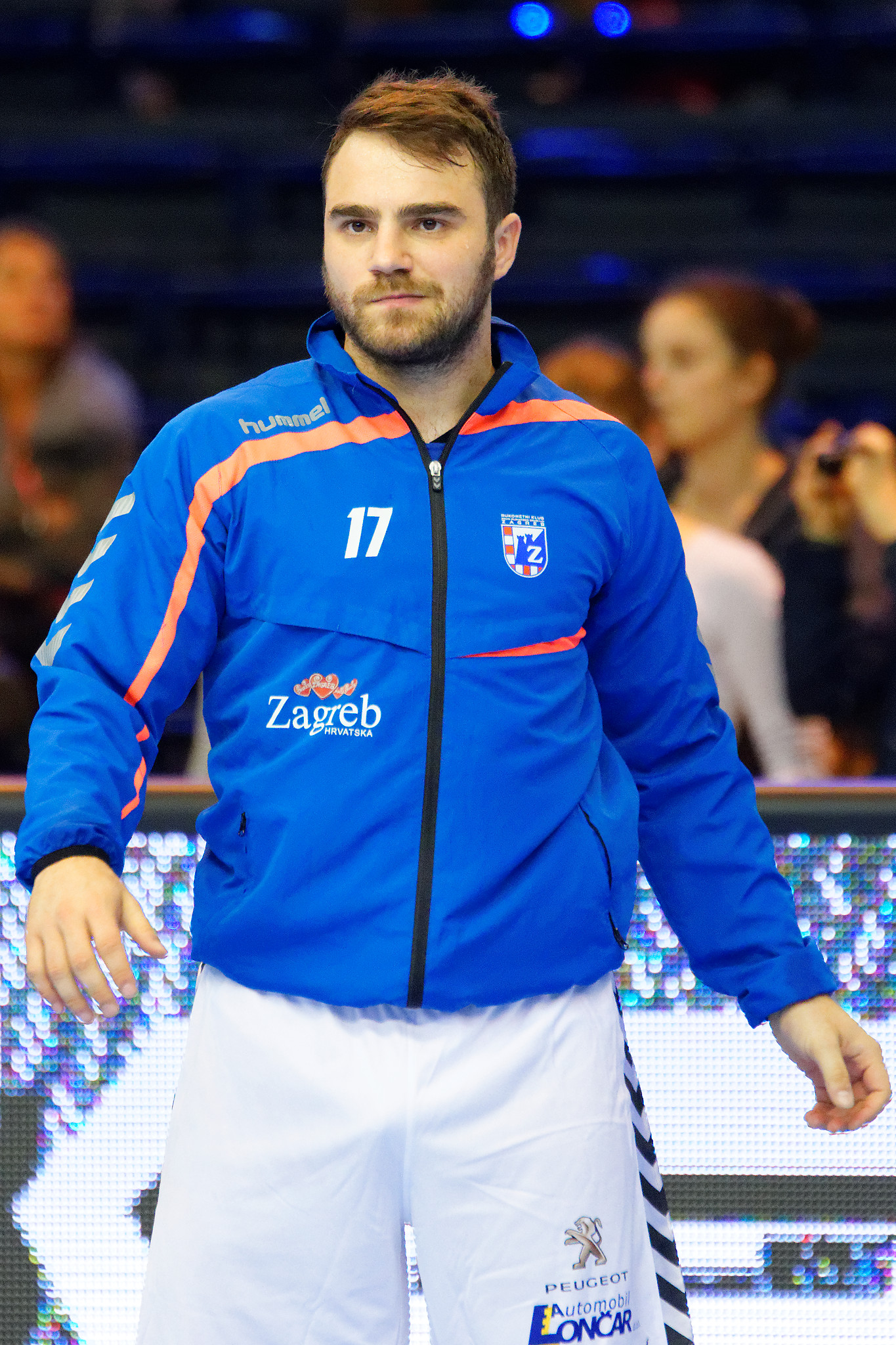
- Raković in October 2015

Personal information
- Full name: Luka Raković
- Nationality: Croatian
- Born: 6 June 1988 (age 38) Zagreb, SFRY
- Height: 1.79 m (5 ft 10 in)

Sport
- Sport: Handball
- Position: Right wing
- Current club: Grand Nancy Métropole HB
- Number: 24

Senior clubs
- Years: Team
- 2006–2007: RK Bjelovar
- 2007–2008: Perutnina Pipo IPC
- 2008–2009: RK Metković
- 2009–2010: RK Zagreb
- 2010–2012: Bosna Gas Sarajevo
- 2012–2014: RK Vardar
- 2014–2016: RK Zagreb
- 2016–2017: S.L. Benfica
- 2017–2019: TuS N-Lübbecke
- 2020: Grand Nancy Métropole HB
National team
- Years: Team
- 2005–2006: Croatia U18
- 2006–2007: Croatia U19
- 2009–present: Croatia
Medal record
Representing Croatia
Men's Handball
European Championship
Silver medal – second place	2010 Austria	Team competition
Cadet European Championship
Gold medal – first place	2006 Estonia	Team competition
Juniors World Championship
Silver medal – second place	2007 Bahrain	Team competition

Luka Raković (born 6 June 1988) is a Croatian handball player who plays for Grand Nancy Métropole HB. A Croatian international, Raković was runner-up at the 2010 European Men's Championship in Austria.

== Clubs ==
Born in Zagreb, Raković played for Croatian clubs Perutnina Pipo Cakovec, RK Bjelovar and RK Zagreb. He was a member of Bosnian club Bosna BH Gas, which reached the EHF Champions League last 16 of the 2010–11 season. With the latter he won the domestic league in 2011. In the summer 2012, he signed for Macedonian side RK Vardar Skopje. Two years later, he returned to RK Zagreb. In November 2016, he joined Portuguese side S.L. Benfica for one season.

== Honours ==
RK Zagreb

- Premier League: 2009–10, 2014–15, 2015–16
- Croatian Cup: 2010, 2015, 2016

Bosna Sarajevo

- Premier League of Bosnia and Herzegovina: 2010–11

Vardar

- Macedonian Super League: 2012–13
- Macedonian Cup: 2014
- SEHA League: 2013–14
