= Denis Buntić =

Croatian handball player (born 1982)

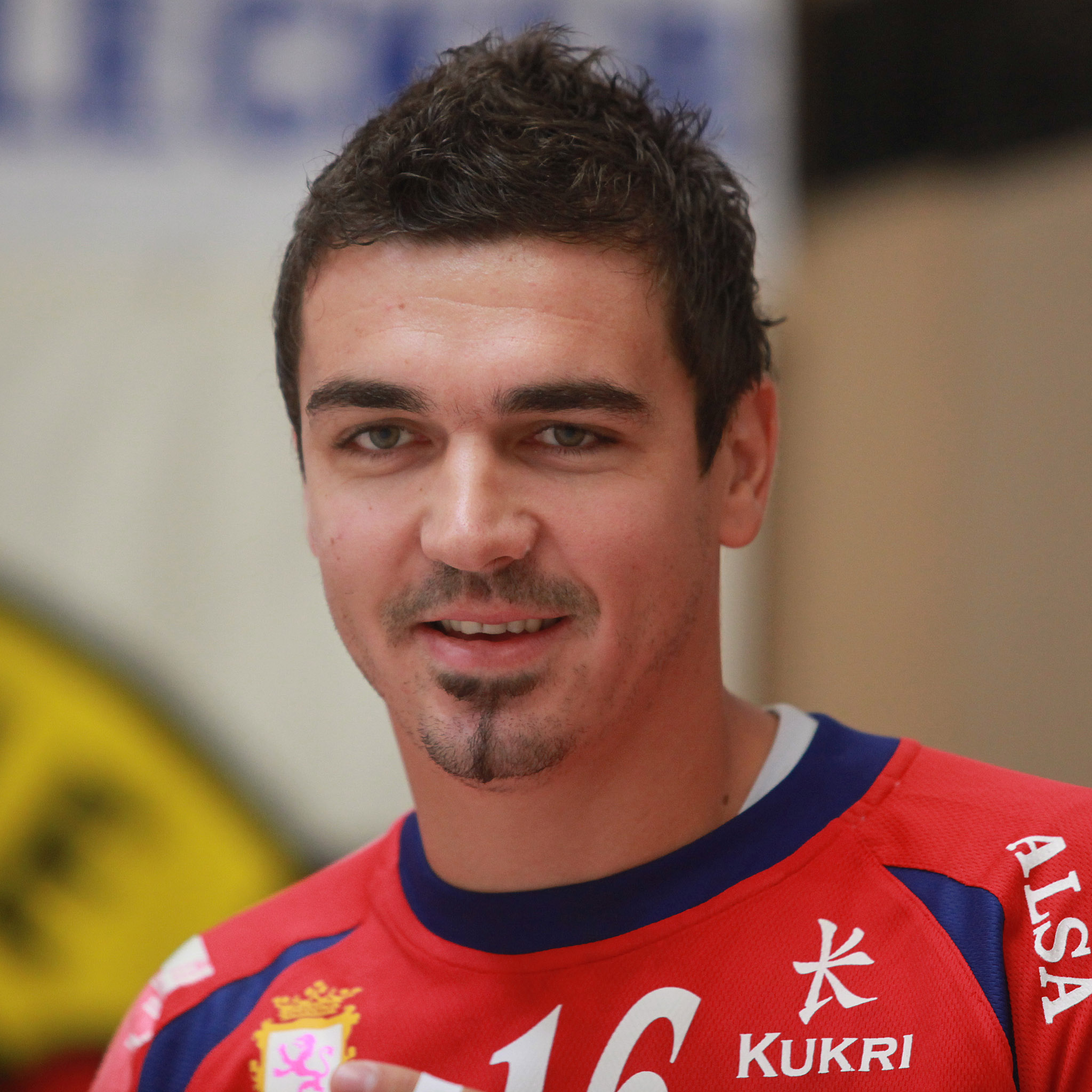

Personal information
- Nationality: Croatian
- Born: 13 November 1982 (age 43) Ljubuški, SR Bosnia and Herzegovina, SFR Yugoslavia
- Height: 1.98 m (6 ft 6 in)

Sport
- Sport: Handball
- Position: Right back

Senior clubs
- Years: Team
- 1998–2006: HRK Izviđač
- 2006–2007: RK Medveščak Zagreb
- 2007–2008: RK Cimos Koper
- 2008–2011: Ademar León
- 2011–2016: Vive Targi Kielce
- 2016–2018: SC Pick Szeged
- 2018: HRK Izviđač
National team
Years	Team	Apps	(Gls)
2005–2018	Croatia	131	(293)
Medal record
Olympic Games
Bronze medal – third place	2012 London	Team
World Championship
Silver medal – second place	2005 Tunisia
Silver medal – second place	2009 Croatia
European Championship
Silver medal – second place	2010 Austria
Bronze medal – third place	2012 Serbia
Mediterranean Games
Silver medal – second place	2005 Almería	Team

Denis Buntić (born 13 November 1982) is a retired Croatian handball player who also played for the Croatian national team. Buntić was born in Ljubuški, SR Bosnia and Herzegovina, SFR Yugoslavia. He won the silver medal at the 2005 World Championship in Tunisia, and another silver at the 2009 World Championship on home soil. He was part of the Croatian team that won the bronze medal at the 2012 Summer Olympics.

== Personal life ==
He was reported for domestic violence in October 2023.

== Honours ==
Izviđač

- Premier League of Bosnia and Herzegovina: 1999–00, 2001–02, 2003–2004, 2004–05
- Cup of Bosnia and Herzegovina: 1999, 2002

Cimos Koper

- Slovenian Cup: 2008

Ademar León

- Copa ASOBAL: 2009

Vive Targi Kielce

- EHF Champions League
  - Winner: 2015–16
  - Third: 2012–13, 2014–15

=== Orders ===
- Order of the Croatian Trefoil - 2005
