= Zdravko Rađenović =

Bosnian handball player

3rd President of the Olympic Committee of Bosnia and Herzegovina
- In office 2001–2002 Serving with Ahmed Karabegović; Ljiljanko Naletilić
- Preceded by: Bogić Bogićević
- Succeeded by: Milanko Mučibabić

Personal details
- Born: 5 September 1952 (age 74) Bačka Palanka, FPR Yugoslavia
- Handball career
- Height: 194 cm (76 in)
- Sport: Handball
- Position: Centre back

Youth career
- Years: Team
- -1964: Tekstilac Bačka Palanka
- 1964-1969: RK Sloga Doboj

Senior clubs
- Years: Team
- 1969-1971: RK Sinelton
- 1971-1972: RK Kvarner
- 1973-1981: RK Borac Banja Luka
- 1981-1987: MTSV Schwabing
- 1987-1991: RK Borac Banja Luka
National team
Years	Team	Apps	(Gls)
–	Yugoslavia	137	(389)
Medal record
Representing Yugoslavia
Olympic Games
Gold medal – first place	1984 Los Angeles	Team
World Championship
Silver medal – second place	1982 West Germany	Team
Bronze medal – third place	1974 East Germany	Team
Mediterranean Games
Gold medal – first place	1975 Algeria	Team
Gold medal – first place	1979 Split	Team

Zdravko Rađenović (Serbian Cyrillic: Здравко Рађеновић, born 5 September 1952) is a Serbian retired handball player and former president of the Olympic Committee of Bosnia and Herzegovina, who competed for the Yugoslavia national handball team in two Olympic tournaments.

== Career ==
=== Club ===
Zdravko Rađenović started his career at youth level playing for RK Sloga Doboj between 1964 and 1969. Majority of his senior years, between 1973 and 1981, Rađenović spent playing for multiple Yugoslav championships winning club RK Borac Banja Luka, leaving his mark on a team and generation that won four championships in a row. He also won the 1976 European Cup with the club. From 1981 to 1987 he played for MTSV Schwabing. Here he won the DHB-Pokal in 1986.

=== National team ===
Over the years, Zdravko Rađenović was selected for the Yugoslavia national handball team on multiple occasion during his career, having important role as a player and competing at highest international levels, most notably at the 1976 Summer Olympics and 1984 Summer Olympics.

At the 1976 Olympics tournament in Montreal he was a member of the Yugoslav handball team which finished fifth. He played all six matches and scored twelve goals.

Eight years later, at the 1984 Olympics tournament in Los Angeles, he was part of the Yugoslav handball team which won the gold medal. He played all six matches and scored ten goals.

=== Legacy ===
The handball dribble move 'a Radjenovic' is named after Zdravko Rađenović.

== Administrative service ==
From 2001 to 2002 he served as the president of the Olympic Committee of Bosnia and Herzegovina.

== Personal life ==
He was born an ethnic Serb in Bačka Palanka, Serbia, FPR Yugoslavia.

== Honours ==
=== Borac Banja Luka ===
- Yugoslav First League (5): 1972–73, 1973–74, 1974–75, 1975–76. 1980-81
- Yugoslav Cup (3): 1974, 1975, 1979
- European Champions Cup (1): 1976
- EHF Cup (1): 1991

=== MTSV Schwabing ===
- DHB-Pokal (1): 1986
