= Muhamed Mustafić =

Bosnian professional handballer (born 1981)

Personal information
- Born: 6 April 1981 (age 45) Rogatica, SFR Yugoslavia
- Height: 1.83 m (6 ft 0 in)

Sport
- Sport: Handball
- Position: Right wing
- Number: 10

Senior clubs
- Years: Team
- 1998–2004: (Bosnia and Herzegovina) RK Bosna Visoko
- 2004–2008: (Bosnia and Herzegovina) RK Bosna Sarajevo
- 2008–2009: (Montenegro) RK Lovćen
- 2009–: (Bosnia and Herzegovina) RK Bosna Visoko
National team
Years	Team	Apps	(Gls)
2000–	Bosnia and Herzegovina	44	(55)
- Updated on September 2013 (UTC)

Muhamed Mustafić (born 6 April 1981 in Rogatica) is a Bosnian professional handballer. Currently, he plays in North Cyprus for Turkish Handball Super League team S.K Besaparmak.
