= MRK Sloga Gornji Vakuf - Uskoplje =

Professional handball club from Bosnia and Herzegovina

MRK Sloga
- Full name: Muški rukometni klub Sloga Gornji Vakuf – Uskoplje
- Founded: 1956.; 70 years ago
- Arena: SD Gornji Vakuf – Uskoplje
- Capacity: 2,000
- President: Adnan Telalović
- Head coach: Goran Biljaka
- League: First League FBiH - South
- 2023–24: 3rd
- Club colours
Home	Away

Muški rukometni klub Sloga Gornji Vakuf – Uskoplje (English: Men's Handball Club Sloga Gornji Vakuf – Uskoplje), commonly referred to as Sloga is a professional handball club from Gornji Vakuf-Uskoplje, Bosnia and Herzegovina. The club competes in the Handball Championship of Bosnia and Herzegovina, and the EHF European Cup.

== History ==
The club was founded in 1956 by teacher Đuro Hrčan from Pančevo (Serbia) as RK Partizan. In 1970. it was renamed "RK Rudar", and finally in 1978. to "Sloga" It is the second oldest sports club in Gornji Vakuf-Uskoplje.

== Honours ==
=== Domestic competitions ===
- First League of Federation of Bosnia and Herzegovina – South:
  - Winners (1): 2017–18

== European record ==
Season	Competition	Round	Club	1st leg	2nd leg	Aggregate
2020–21	EHF Cup	R2	(Romania) CSM București	23–30	15–31	38–61

== Team ==
=== Current squad ===
Squad for the 2020–21 season

Goalkeepers

- 1 (Bosnia and Herzegovina) Selmir Destanović
- 12 (Bosnia and Herzegovina) Selvedin Spahić
- 66 (Bosnia and Herzegovina) Berzad Demirović (c)
- 16 (Bosnia and Herzegovina) Alen Čaber

Left Wingers

- 13 (Bosnia and Herzegovina) Amar Ruspić
- 15 (Bosnia and Herzegovina) Ivano Bodrušić
- 26 (Bosnia and Herzegovina) Marijan Šaravanja
- 5 (Bosnia and Herzegovina) Branko Boškić

Right Wingers

- 8 (Bosnia and Herzegovina) Amer Dedić
- 27 (Bosnia and Herzegovina) Ajdin Demirović
- 14 (Bosnia and Herzegovina) Mirza Demirović

Line players

- 25 (Bosnia and Herzegovina) Edin Gekić
- 10 (Bosnia and Herzegovina) Arman Ljutić
- 24 (Bosnia and Herzegovina) Radovan Uljarević
- 2 (Bosnia and Herzegovina) Ejub Hadžić
- 77 (Bosnia and Herzegovina) Amer Demirović
- 18 (Bosnia and Herzegovina) Mirza Kaharić

Left Backs

- 10 (Bosnia and Herzegovina) Haris Čaluk
- 17 (Bosnia and Herzegovina) Mesud Pokvić

Central Backs

- 19 (Montenegro) Božidar Simić
- 4 (Bosnia and Herzegovina) Anes Halebić

Right Backs

- 3 (Bosnia and Herzegovina) Goran Biljaka
- 9 (Bosnia and Herzegovina) Adem Gudić
- 6 (Bosnia and Herzegovina) Robert Štrkalj

Squad for the 2021–22 season

Goalkeepers

- 1 (Bosnia and Herzegovina) Nedim Agić
- 12 (Bosnia and Herzegovina) Mirnes Grčo
- 16 (Bosnia and Herzegovina) Alen Čaber

Left Wingers

- 23 (Bosnia and Herzegovina) Branko Boškić
- 92 (Bosnia and Herzegovina) Adnan Jamaković

Right Wingers

- 8 (Bosnia and Herzegovina) Amer Dedić
- 27 (Bosnia and Herzegovina) Ajdin Demirović

Line players

- 24 (Bosnia and Herzegovina) Radovan Uljarević
- 2 (Bosnia and Herzegovina) Ejub Hadžić
- 77 (Bosnia and Herzegovina) Amer Demirović

Left Backs

- 39 (Bosnia and Herzegovina) Goran Šarenac
- 17 (Bosnia and Herzegovina) Mesud Pokvić

Central Backs

- 4 (Bosnia and Herzegovina) Anes Halebić
- 9 (Bosnia and Herzegovina) Amar Amitović

Right Backs

- 3 (Bosnia and Herzegovina) Goran Biljaka
- 6 (Bosnia and Herzegovina) Robert Štrkalj

== Recent seasons ==
The recent season-by-season performance of the club:

Season	Division	Tier	Position
2010–11	First League FBiH – South	II	8th
2013–14	First League FBiH – South	II	2nd
2017–18	First League FBiH – South	II	1st ↑
2018–19	Premier League	I	8th
2019–20	Premier League	I	4th
2020–21	Premier League	I	9th
2021–22	Premier League	I	14th ↓
2022–23	First League FBiH - South	II	3rd
2023–24	First League FBiH - South	II	3rd
2024–25	First League FBiH - South	II	4th

Key

↑ Promoted	↓ Relegated

== Coaching history ==
- (Bosnia and Herzegovina) Fuad Mahmutović
- (Bosnia and Herzegovina) Rasim Demirović ( – 24 April 2019)
- (Serbia) Aleksandar Radosavljević (20 May 2019 – 11 November 2021)
- (Bosnia and Herzegovina) Edin Hadžiabdić (12 November 2021 – 01 July 2022)
- (Bosnia and Herzegovina) Goran Biljaka (27 July 2022 – present)
