= Faruk Vražalić =

Bosnian handball player

Personal information
- Born: 22 June 1990 (age 36) Sarajevo, Bosnia and Herzegovina
- Height: 1.87 m (6 ft 2 in)

Sport
- Sport: Handball
- Position: Right wing
- Current club: RK Bosna Sarajevo
- Number: 14

Senior clubs
- Years: Team
- –2009: HC Bosna Visoko
- 2009–2011: RK Bosna Sarajevo
- 2012–: RK Sloga Doboj
- –2012: CB Ademar León
- 2012–2014: ThSV Eisenach
- 2014: RK Vogošća
- 2014–2015: HBW Balingen-Weilstetten
- 2015–2016: Füchse Berlin
- 2016–2018: Beşiktaş
- 2018–2019: CSM București
- 2020: RK Dubrovnik
- 2020–: RK Bosna Sarajevo
National team
Years	Team	Apps	(Gls)
2010–	Bosnia and Herzegovina	40	(126)
- Updated on 4 May 2015

Faruk Vražalić (born 22 June 1990) is a Bosnian handball player who plays for RK Bosna Sarajevo and the Bosnian national handball team.

Vražalić signed for Füchse Berlin in August 2015 Vražalić previously played for: RK Bosna Visoko, RK Bosna Sarajevo, Sloga Doboj, Ademar Leon, ThSV Eisenach, RK Vogošća, Füchse Berlin and HBW Balingen-Weilstetten. He is also a member of the Bosnian national handball team. He also won on IHF superglobe with Füchse Berlin.
