= Handball Cup of Bosnia and Herzegovina =

The Handball Cup of Bosnia and Herzegovina is the national handball cup of Bosnia and Herzegovina. It is organized for men and women and run by the Handball Federation of Bosnia and Herzegovina. Before 2001/2002 season, there were three separated cup competitions, organized on ethnical principles. In 1998 and 1999 joint play-off was organized, and in 2000 three-teams-league, as the clubs from Republika Srpska took part for the first time. It is a regular cup competition since 2001/2002 season.

== Cup finals ==
Season	Men		Women	
Season	Winner	Runner-up	Winner	Runner-up
2001-2002	HRK Izviđač		ŽRK Željezničar Hadžići	
2002-2003	RK Bosna Sarajevo		HŽRK Ljubuški HO	
2003-2004	RK Bosna Sarajevo (2)		ŽRK Borac Srpske Pošte	
2004-2005	RK Sloga Doboj		HŽRK Ljubuški HO	
2005-2006	RK Sloga Mobis (2)		HŽRK Ljubuški-Trgocoop	
2006-2007	RK Borac Telekom Srpske		HRK Katarina Mostar	
2007-2008	RK Bosna Lido osiguranje (3)		ŽRK Borac Banja Luka	
2008-2009	RK Bosna Sunce osiguranje (4)		ŽRK Borac Banja Luka	
2009-2010	RK Bosna BH Gas (5)		ŽRK Borac Banja Luka	
2010-2011	RK Borac m:tel (2)		HRK Katarina Mostar	
2011-2012	RK Goražde Bekto		ŽRK Borac Banja Luka	
2012-2013	RK Borac m:tel (3)		ŽRK Borac Banja Luka	
2013-2014	RK Borac m:tel (4)		ŽRK Mira Prijedor	
2014-2015	RK Borac m:tel (5)		HŽRK Grude Autoherc	
2015-2016	RK Vogošća Poljine Hills		HŽRK Grude Autoherc	
2016-2017	HMRK Zrinjski Mostar		Final 4 not played	
2017-2018	RK Borac m:tel (6)		HŽRK Ljubuški	
2018-2019	RK Borac m:tel (7)		HŽRK Grude	
2019-2020	RK Sloboda Tuzla		RK Hadžići	
2020-2021	RK Sloboda Tuzla (2)		ŽRK Borac Banja Luka	
2021-2022	RK Izviđač (2)	RK Sloboda Tuzla	HŽRK Grude	
2022-2023	RK Vogošća (2)	RK Izviđač Agram		
2023-2024	RK Borac m:tel (8)	RK Leotar		
2024-2025	RK Izviđač (3)	RK Vogošća	Final 4 not played	

== Performance by club ==
Club / men	Titles	Years won
RK Borac Banja Luka	8	2007, 2011, 2013, 2014, 2015, 2018, 2019, 2024
RK Bosna Sarajevo	5	2003, 2004, 2008, 2009, 2010
HRK Izviđač	3	2002, 2022, 2025
RK Sloboda Tuzla	2	2020, 2021
RK Sloga Doboj	2	2005, 2006
RK Vogošća Poljine Hills	2	2016, 2023
RK Goražde	1	2012
HMRK Zrinjski Mostar	1	2017

== Winners of regional cups ==
BiH Cup winners

Season	Men's winner	Women's winner
1994-1995	HC Bosna Visoko	RK Čelik Zenica
1995-1996	RK Sloboda Solana	ŽRK Željezničar Hadžići
1996-1997	RK Borac Travnik	ŽRK Jedinstvo Tuzla
1997-1998	HC Bosna Visoko	ŽRK Jedinstvo Tuzla
1998-1999	HRK Izviđač	ŽRK Željezničar Hadžići
1999-2000	RK Legno Sarajevo	ŽRK Jedinstvo Tuzla
2000-2001	HC Bosna Visoko	ŽRK Jedinstvo Tuzla

This cup was organized by Handball Federation of Bosnia and Herzegovina, and recognized by EHF.

Cup of Republika Srpska winners

Season	Men's winner	Women's winner
1992-1993	RK Borac Banja Luka	ŽRK Mladost Banja Luka
1993-1994	RK Borac Banja Luka	ŽRK Mladost Banja Luka
1994-1995	not held	not held
1995-1996	RK Borac Banja Luka	ŽRK Mladost Banja Luka
1996-1997	RK Borac Banja Luka	ŽRK Mladost Banja Luka
1997-1998	RK Borac Banja Luka	ŽRK Mladost Banja Luka
1998-1999	RK Borac Banja Luka	ŽRK Mladost Banja Luka
1999-2000	RK Borac Banja Luka	ŽRK Mladost Banja Luka
2000-2001	RK Borac Banja Luka	ŽRK Mladost Banja Luka

Cup of Herzeg-Bosnia winners

Season	Men's winner	Women's winner
1993-1994	HRK Izviđač	HŽRK Zrinjski Mostar
1994-1995	HRK Izviđač	HŽRK Zrinjski Mostar
1995-1996	HRK Izviđač	HŽRK Zrinjski Mostar
1996-1997	HRK Izviđač	HŽRK Zrinjski Mostar
1997-1998	HRK Izviđač	HŽRK Interinvest Mostar
1998-1999	HRK Izviđač	HŽRK Zrinjski Mostar
1999-2000	HRK Izviđač	HŽRK Zrinjski Mostar
2000-2001	HRK Izviđač	HŽRK Zrinjski Mostar

== See also ==
- Handball Championship of Bosnia and Herzegovina
