= HMRK Zrinjski Mostar =

Handball club in Bosnia and Herzegovina

- Full name: Hrvatski muški rukometni klub Zrinjski Mostar
- Nickname: Plemići (The Noblemen)
- Founded: 21 December 1992; 33 years ago
- Arena: Bijeli Brijeg Hall
- Capacity: 1,000
- President: Toni Zovko
- Head coach: Zdravko Medić
- League: First League of the Federation of Bosnia and Herzegovina – South
- Club colours
Home	Away

HMRK Zrinjski Mostar (Croatian: Hrvatski muški rukometni klub Zrinjski Mostar, English: Croat Men's Handball Club Zrinjski Mostar) is a Croat-founded men's handball team from the city of Mostar, Bosnia and Herzegovina.

The club plays in the First League of the Federation of Bosnia and Herzegovina – South. It is part of the Zrinjski Mostar sport society. Fans of HMRK Zrinjski are known as Ultras.

Zrinjski's greatest accomplishment has been reaching the Last 16 of the 2017–18 EHF Challenge Cup and winning the National Cup in 2017. The team squad consists of more than 90% of players from Mostar.

== Honours ==
- Handball Cup of Bosnia and Herzegovina:
  - Winners (1): 2017

== European Record ==
Season	Competition	Round	Club	1st leg	2nd leg	Aggregate
2017–18	EHF Challenge Cup	Round 3	(Georgia (country)) B.S.B. Batumi	47–17	42–32	89–49
2017–18	EHF Challenge Cup	Last 16	(Russia) SKIF Krasnodar	27–39	28–30	57–67
2004–05	EHF Challenge Cup	Round 3	(North Macedonia) RK Mladost	24–28	31–28	55–56

== Recent seasons ==
The recent season-by-season performance of the club:

Season	Division	Tier	Position
2014–15	Premier League	I	10th
2015–16	Premier League	I	9th
2016–17	Premier League	I	5th
2017–18	Premier League	I	3rd
2018–19	Premier League	I	9th ↓
2019–20	First League of Herzeg Bosnia	III	1st ↑
2020–21	First League FBiH – South	II	10th

Note: 2018–19 relegation for financial reasons

Key

↑ Promoted	↓ Relegated

== Notable players ==
- (Croatia) Marino Marić
- (Montenegro) Fahrudin Melić
- (Croatia) Marin Šego
- (Croatia) Igor Karačić
- (Bosnia and Herzegovina) Ivan Karačić
- (Croatia) Mirko Herceg
- (Bosnia and Herzegovina) Josip Perić

== Coaching history ==
- (Croatia) Enco Bukovac
- (Bosnia and Herzegovina) Zoran Dokić
- (Bosnia and Herzegovina) Željko Anić
- (Bosnia and Herzegovina) Damir Saltarić
- (Bosnia and Herzegovina) Lazar Raguž
- (Bosnia and Herzegovina) Goran Suton
- (Croatia) Zdravko Medić
