= Jovan Talevski =

Macedonian handball player

Personal information
- Nationality: Macedonian
- Born: 18 September 1994 (age 32) Skopje, Macedonia
- Height: 1.85 m (6 ft 1 in)

Sport
- Sport: Handball
- Position: Centre back
- Current club: ESV Lokomotive Pirna
- Number: 10

Youth career
- Years: Team
- –: (North Macedonia) RK Vardar

Senior clubs
- Years: Team
- 2013–2014: → (North Macedonia) HC Rabotnichki
- 2014–2016: (North Macedonia) RK Prilep 2010
- 2016–2019: (Turkey) Yozgat Bozokspor
- 2019–2020: (Bosnia and Herzegovina) RK Sloboda Tuzla
- 2020–2021: (North Macedonia) RK Eurofarm Pelister 2
- 2021–2023: (Germany) TV 1878 Homburg
- 2023–: (Germany) ESV Lokomotive Pirna

Jovan Talevski (Macedonian: Јован Талевски, born 18 September 1994) is a Macedonian handball player who plays for ESV Lokomotive Pirna.
