= Pero Janjić =

Bosnian Croat handball coach

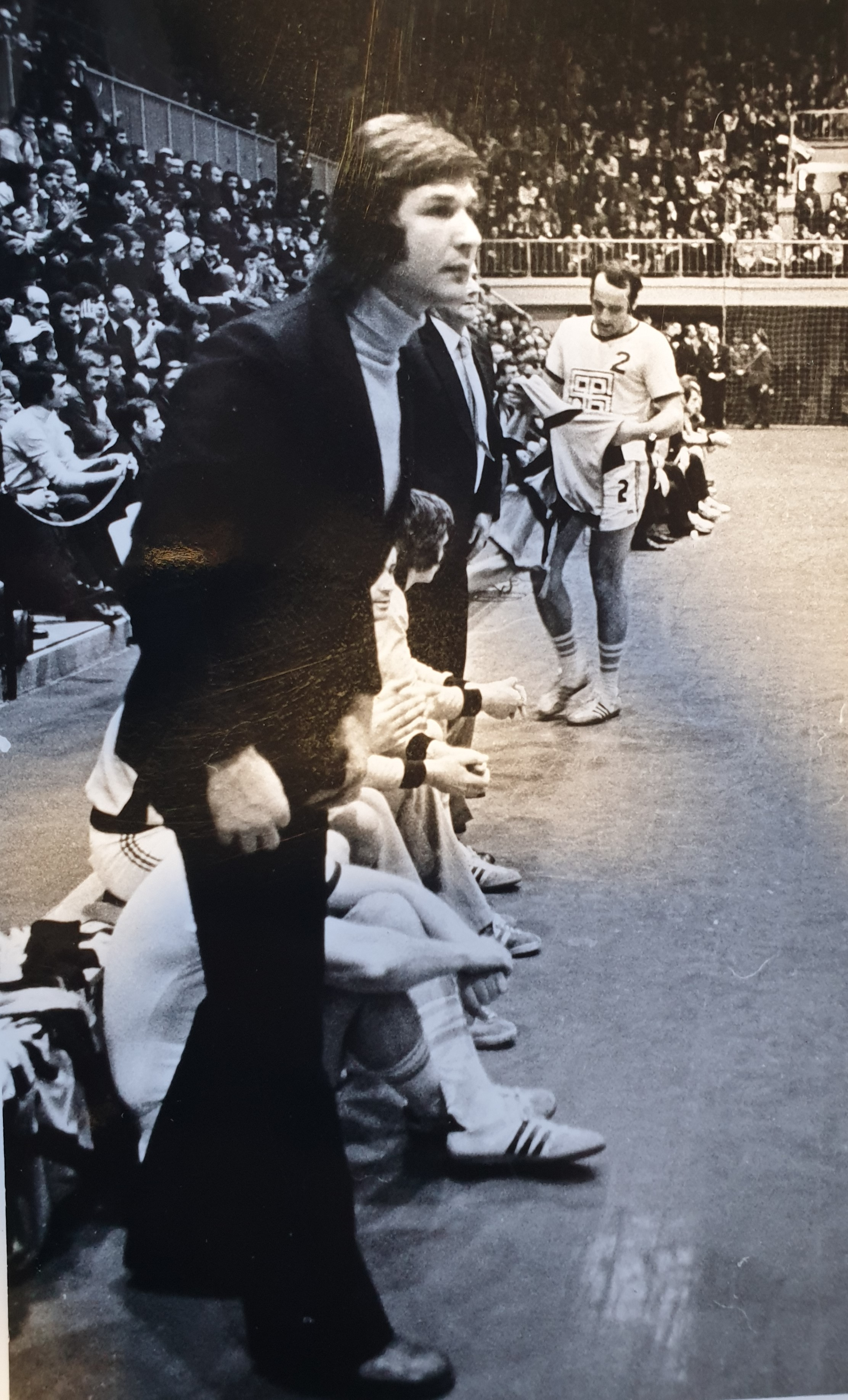

Personal information
- Nationality: Bosnian / Croatian
- Born: 27 September 1944 (age 82) Banja Luka, Independent State of Croatia
- Height: 1.94 m (6 ft 4 in)

Sport
- Sport: Handball

Youth career
- Years: Team
- 1957–1962: Borac Banja Luka

Senior clubs
- Years: Team
- 1962–1970: Borac Banja Luka

Teams managed
- 1970–1972: Borac Banja Luka U-21
- 1972–1976: Borac Banja Luka
- 1976: Yugoslavia
- 1976–1980: Switzerland
- 1980–1981: Borac Banja Luka
- 1982–1983: Füchse Berlin
- 1985–1987: Al Ain
- 1988–1990: Borac Banja Luka
- 1988–1990: Yugoslavia
- 1990–1992: Medveščak Zagreb
- 1994–1996: TSG A-H Bielefeld
- 2000–2001: Medveščak Zagreb

Pero Janjić (born 27 September 1944) is a Bosnian Croat retired handball player and coach.

As a coach, Janjić won the 1976 European Cup with Borac Banja Luka which is still to this day one of the greatest sporting triumphs of clubs from Bosnia and Herzegovina. Janjić also led Borac Banja Luka to four Yugoslav championships in 1974, 1975, 1976 and 1981. He was hailed as a national hero in Switzerland for securing a historic first qualification of the national team to the 1980 Olympics.

== Coaching career ==
Pero Janjić first started coaching at the youth team of Borac Banja Luka, his hometown club where he spent his entire career as a player. At the same time he was teaching physical education at Banja Luka Gymnasium. Janjić got his break to manage Borac first team at a young age of 28. This proved to be the most successful era in the club's history. Janjić spent four years at the helm and won a European Cup, three Yugoslav Championships and two Yugoslav Cups.

In 1976, Janjić managed Yugoslavia national team at 1976 Olympics in Montreal where they finished fifth. Yugoslavia missed the Olympic final by just one goal in the final group match.

Janjić then took over Switzerland national team which was at the time struggling at the third tier World Championship C Group. Under Janjić's leadership, Switzerland's first success was promotion to the second tier B Group. Switzerland then reached the finals of the B Group tournament in 1979, thus securing promotion both to A group and to 1980 Olympics. Due to personal reasons, Janjić had to return home to Yugoslavia and thus didn't get a chance to lead Switzerland at the Olympic tournament.

In 1980, he once again took over his hometown club Borac which were bottom of the table. Janjić made a complete turnaround and led them to another Yugoslav championship title in 1981.

Later in his career, Janjić managed clubs in West Germany, UAE and Croatia.

In 1990 he had another stint as a head coach of Yugoslavia, finishing fourth at the 1990 World Championship. This was Yugoslavia's last major tournament prior to break up of the country.

Velimir Petković considers Janjić as his role model and one of the best handball coaches in the world.

== Personal life ==
Pero Janjić holds a degree in physical education from the University of Sarajevo.

In 1990, he moved from Banja Luka to Zagreb where he lives today.

He has a wife Emina and daughters Ivona and Leana.

== Honours ==
=== Manager ===
==== Club ====
Borac Banja Luka

- Yugoslav Championship (4): 1974, 1975, 1976, 1981
- Yugoslav Cup (2): 1974, 1976
- European Cup winner (1): 1976
- European Cup runner up (1): 1975

==== International ====
Yugoslavia national team

- 1976 Olympic Games - 5th place
- 1990 World Championship - 4th place

Switzerland national team

- 1979 World Championship (B Tournament) - 2nd place
