= RK Izviđač =

Bosnian handball team

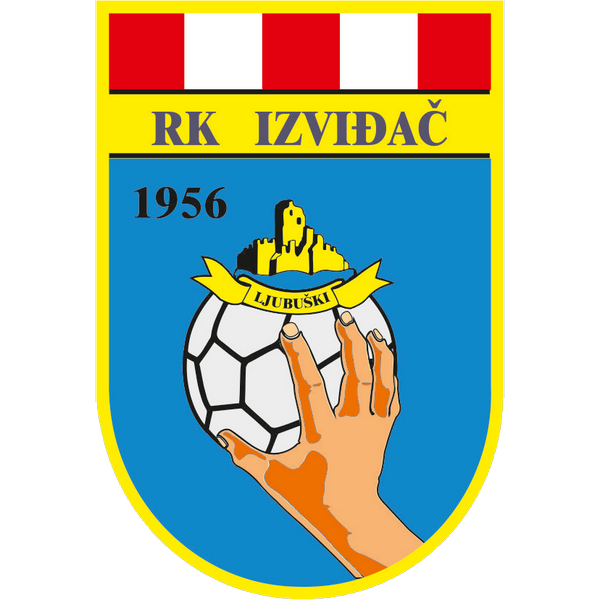
- Full name: Rukometni Klub Izviđač
- Nickname: Skauti
- Short name: Izviđač
- Founded: 1956; 70 years ago
- Arena: Sports Hall Ljubuški
- Capacity: 4,000
- President: Dubravko Grgić
- Head coach: Ivan Džolić
- Captain: Diano Ćeško
- League: Premijer Liga
- 2023–24: 1st
- Club colours
Home	Away

RK Izviđač (Croatian: Rukometni klub Izviđač, English: Handball Club Izviđač) is a team handball club from Ljubuški, Bosnia and Herzegovina, RK Izviđač competes in the Handball Championship of Bosnia and Herzegovina, with ten titles won it is the most successful team in the country.

Location of RK Izviđač

== History ==
The club was founded in 1956 as Omladinski rukometni klub Partizan Ljubuški ('Youth Handball Club Partizan Ljubuški'). In socialist Yugoslavia, Izviđač played a subordinate role among the other handball clubs in the state.

The club has won the unified first division in Bosnia and Herzegovina: the Premijer Liga 12 times: in 2000, 2002, 2004, 2005, 2016, 2018, 2019, 2021, 2023, 2024, 2025 and 2026. The club won the Handball Cup of Bosnia and Herzegovina 4 times: in 1999, 2002, 2022 and 2025. They made their first appearance on the international cup circuit in the EHF City Cup in the 1998/99 season, which ended quickly after two heavy defeats against RK Lovćen. The club played for the first time in the EHF Cup Winners' Cup in the 1999/2000 season, in the EHF Champions League in the 2000/2001 season, and in the EHF Cup in the 2002/2003 season. In the 2025–26 EHF Cup season, Ljubuški reached semi-finals so far.

== Kits ==
HOME
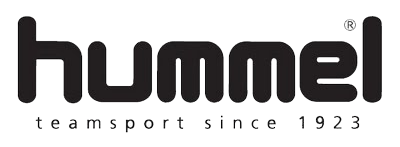
2016-17

AWAY
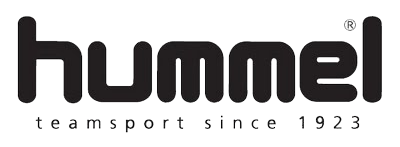
2016-17

== Team ==
=== Current squad ===
Squad for the 2025–26 season

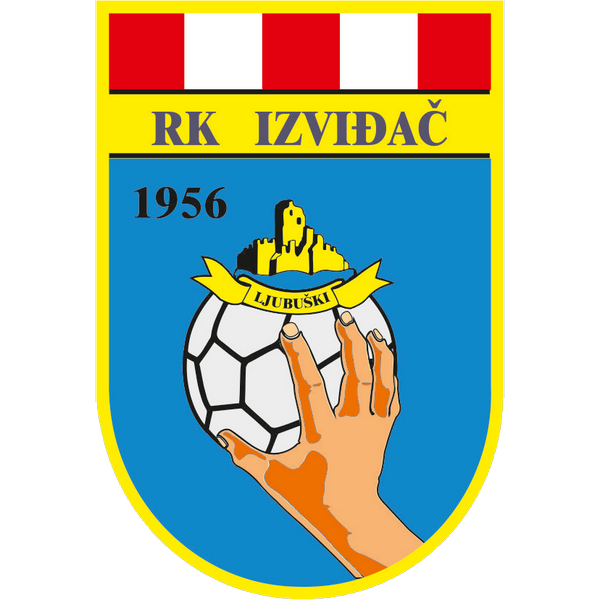
RK Izviđač

Goalkeepers

- 1 (Croatia) Marko Čuljak
- 16 (Bosnia and Herzegovina) Aldin Alihodžić
- 25 (Serbia) Miloš Knežević

Left Wingers

- 4 (Croatia) Maro Boras
- 13 (Croatia) Matej Šimić
- 15 (Bosnia and Herzegovina) Mirko Mišetić

Right Wingers

- 11 (Bosnia and Herzegovina) Edvin Dželilović
- 14 (Bosnia and Herzegovina) Luka Bubalo
- 30 (Bosnia and Herzegovina) Kristian Katić
- 44 (Montenegro) Fahrudin Melić

Line Players

- 3 (Croatia) Zvonimir Lukenda
- 7 (Serbia) Luka Sević
- 24 (Croatia) Mile Lasić
- 33 (Bosnia and Herzegovina) Djordje Ratković

Left Backs

- 10 (Croatia) Milan Dedić
- 18 (Croatia) Diano Ćeško
- 22 (Croatia) Mihael Bebek
- 26 (Croatia) Patrick Dodig
- 29 (Montenegro) Andrija Jokić

Central Backs

- 5 (Croatia) Mihael Mandić
- 8 (Bosnia and Herzegovina) Amer Šahinović
- 17 (Bosnia and Herzegovina) Danijel Stijović
- 21 (Croatia) Petar Grbavac

Right Backs

- 6 (Croatia) Filip Odak
- 19 (Bosnia and Herzegovina) Kerim Semić
- 23 (Bosnia and Herzegovina) Sergej Purić

=== Technical staff ===
- Head coach: (Bosnia and Herzegovina) Ivan Džolić
- Assistant coach: (Bosnia and Herzegovina) Milan Tolić
- Fitness coach: (Bosnia and Herzegovina) Adis Jakić
- Physiotherapist: (Bosnia and Herzegovina) Ante Bunoza

=== Transfers ===
Transfers for the 2026–27 season

Joining

Leaving

- (Croatia) Diano Ćeško (LB) to (Croatia) RK Zagreb
- (Bosnia and Herzegovina) Edvin Dželilović (RW) to (North Macedonia) RK Eurofarm Pelister

=== Transfer history ===
Transfers for the 2025–26 season

Joining

- (Serbia) Miloš Knežević (GK) from (Bosnia and Herzegovina) RK Leotar
- (Montenegro) Andrija Jokić (LB) from (Montenegro) RK Rudar Pljevlja
- (Bosnia and Herzegovina) Mirko Mišetić (LW) from (Bosnia and Herzegovina) RK Leotar
- (Bosnia and Herzegovina) Danijel Stijović (CB) from (Bosnia and Herzegovina) RK Maglaj
- (Montenegro) Fahrudin Melić (RW) from (Bosnia and Herzegovina) RK Vogošća
- (Bosnia and Herzegovina) Djordje Ratković (LP) from (Slovenia) MRK Krka

Leaving

- (Montenegro) Haris Suljević (GK) to (Spain) CB Cangas
- (Croatia) Zlatko Ševo (CB)
- (Croatia) Marijan Šaravanja (LW) to (Bosnia and Herzegovina) HMRK Zrinjski Mostar
- (Bosnia and Herzegovina) Matej Ljubić (LP) to (Bosnia and Herzegovina) HMRK Zrinjski Mostar
- (Bosnia and Herzegovina) Milan Vukšić (CB) to (Hungary) PLER-Budapest
- (Bosnia and Herzegovina) Todor Milisavljević (CB) to (Bosnia and Herzegovina) RK Sloga Doboj

== Honours ==
- Handball Championship of Bosnia and Herzegovina
  - Winners (12): 2000, 2002, 2004, 2005, 2016, 2018, 2019, 2021, 2023, 2024, 2025, 2026
- Handball Cup of Bosnia and Herzegovina:
  - Winners (4): 1999, 2002, 2022, 2025

== EHF ranking ==
As of 09/05/2026

Rank	Team	Points
26	(North Macedonia) RK Vardar	182
27	(Switzerland) Kadetten Schaffhausen	179
28	(Hungary) MOL Tatabánya KC	175
29	(Bosnia and Herzegovina) RK Izviđač	171
30	(Greece) Olympiacos	170
31	(North Macedonia) RK Eurofarm Pelister	160
32	(Norway) Kolstad Håndball	159

== Former club members ==
=== Notable former players ===
Criteria

To appear in this section a player must have either:

- Played at least one official international match for their national team at any time.
- Or spent at least 10 years with the team.

==== Goalkeepers ====
- (Bosnia and Herzegovina) Benjamin Burić (2008–2013)
- (Bosnia and Herzegovina) Adnan Šabanović (2006–2007)
- (Croatia) (Bosnia and Herzegovina) Mirko Alilović (2000–2005)
- (Croatia) Goran Čarapina (2000–2001)
- (Croatia) Matej Mandić (2018–2021)
- (Croatia) Marin Šego (2002–2004, 2005–2006)
- (Montenegro) Goran Anđelić (2018–2019)
- (Montenegro) Haris Suljević (2021–2025)

==== Right wingers ====
- (Bosnia and Herzegovina) Mladen Bošković (2020–2023)
- (Croatia) Josip Ereš (2012–2016)
- (Montenegro) Fahrudin Melić (2026–)

==== Left wingers ====
- (Bosnia and Herzegovina) Vedran Delić (2018–2019)
- (Bosnia and Herzegovina) Mirko Mišetić (2018–2022, 2025–)
- (Bosnia and Herzegovina) Tomislav Nuic (2006–2009)
- (Croatia) David Mandić (2012–2018)
- (Croatia) Ljubo Vukić (2006)
- (Montenegro) Filip Vujović (2022)

==== Line players ====
- (Bosnia and Herzegovina) Senjamin Burić (20010–2013)
- (Bosnia and Herzegovina) Amir Muhović (2020–2022)
- (Bosnia and Herzegovina) Dragan Šoljić (2018–2021)
- (Croatia) Željko Musa (2005–2006)
- (Serbia) Ratko Nikolić (2017)

==== Left backs ====
- (Bosnia and Herzegovina) Mirko Herceg (2008–2014)
- (Bosnia and Herzegovina) Ivan Milas (2010–2013)
- (Bosnia and Herzegovina) Nikola Prce (2000–2001, 2004–2006)
- (Bosnia and Herzegovina) Mirsad Terzić (2002–2005)
- (Bosnia and Herzegovina) Marin Vegar (2006–2008)
- (Croatia) Diano Ćeško (2021–2026)
- (Croatia) Matej Hrstić (2012–2017)
- (Croatia) Marko Matić (2005–2012)
- (Croatia) Josip Šarac (2014–2018)
- (Montenegro) Božidar Leković (2017–2018)
- (Serbia) Miloš Kos (2018–2022)
- (Turkey) (Croatia) Josip Buljubašić (2012–2013)

==== Central backs ====
- (Bosnia and Herzegovina) Domagoj Alilović (2017–2023)
- (Bosnia and Herzegovina) Mislav Grgić (2016–2017)
- (Bosnia and Herzegovina) Adnan Harmandić (2002–2006)
- (Bosnia and Herzegovina) Ivan Karačić (2007–2008)
- (Bosnia and Herzegovina) Josip Perić (2008–2012)
- (Bosnia and Herzegovina) Amer Šahinović (2024–)
- (Bosnia and Herzegovina) Milan Vukšić (2018–2025)
- (Croatia) Ivano Pavlović (2021–2024)
- (Montenegro) Vasilije Kaluđerović (2017–2019)

==== Right backs ====
- (Bosnia and Herzegovina) Stjepan Jozinović (2017–2021)
- (Bosnia and Herzegovina) Dejan Malinović (2010–2013)
- (Bosnia and Herzegovina) Darko Martinović (2003–2006)
- (Bosnia and Herzegovina) Kerim Semić (2024–)
- (Croatia) Denis Buntić (1998–2006, 2018)
- (Luxembourg) (Croatia) Josip Ilić (2008–2012)
