= Ivana Ljubas =

Bosnia and Herzegovinan handball player

Personal information
- Nationality: Bosnia and Herzegovina
- Born: 31 October 1985 (age 40) Livno, Bosnia and Herzegovina
- Height: 1.78 m (5 ft 10 in)

Sport
- Sport: Handball
- Position: Left Back
- Current club: GEN-I Zagorje
- Number: 30

Senior clubs
- Years: Team
- –2004: RK Iskra
- 2004–2006: HŽRK Zrinjski Mostar
- 2006–2008: HRK Katarina Mostar
- 2008–2011: RK Zagorje gen-i
- 2011–2012: Békéscsabai Előre NKSE
- 2012-: RK Zagorje

Ivana Ljubas (born 31 October 1985, in Livno) is a handball player from Bosnia and Herzegovina who plays for Slovenian top division side GEN-I Zagorje.
