= 1975–76 European Cup (handball) =

European men's club handball tournament

European Cup
- 1975–76

Tournament information
- Sport: Handball

Final positions
- Champions: Borac Banja Luka

The 1975–76 European Cup was the 16th edition of Europe's premier club handball tournament.

== Knockout stage ==
=== Round 1 ===
Team 1	Agg.	Team 2	1st leg	2nd leg
Benfica (Portugal)	W.O.	(Spain) CB Calpisa		
Volani Rovereto (Italy)	18–22	(Israel) Hapoel Rehovot	10–9	8–13
HV Sittardia (Netherlands)	29–23	(Luxembourg) Fola Esch	16–10	15–13
IK Fredensborg Oslo (Norway)	44–18	(Faroe Islands) Kyndil Tórshavn	22–7	22–11
HC Birkenhead (United Kingdom)	17–47	(Belgium) KV Sasja Antwerpen	7–18	10–29
Union Handballklub Krems (Austria)	27–35	(Switzerland) Grasshoppers Zürich	16–16	11–19

=== Round 2 ===
Team 1	Agg.	Team 2	1st leg	2nd leg
Borac Banja Luka (Socialist Federal Republic of Yugoslavia)	53–36	(Czechoslovakia) Red star Bratislava	27–14	26–22
CB Calpisa (Spain)	45–26	(Israel) Hapoel Rehovot	21–14	24–12
Víkingur Reykjavík (Iceland)	28–40	(Germany) VfL Gummersbach	16–19	12–21
HV Sittardia (Netherlands)	30–40	(Poland) Śląsk Wrocław	17–17	13–23
Sportist Kremikovtzi (Bulgaria)	36–34	(Switzerland) Grasshoppers Zürich	26–21	10–13
HK Drott Halmstad (Sweden)	34–35	(Norway) IK Fredensborg Oslo	16–16	18–19
Sparta Helsinki (Finland)	37–21	(Belgium) KV Sasja Antwerpen	21–6	16–15
SMUC Marseille (France)	30–37	(Denmark) KFUM Fredericia	18–20	12–17

=== Quarterfinals ===
Team 1	Agg.	Team 2	1st leg	2nd leg
Borac Banja Luka (Socialist Federal Republic of Yugoslavia)	41–34	(Spain) CB Calpisa	28–21	13–13
Śląsk Wrocław (Poland)	33–35	(Germany) VfL Gummersbach	22–15	11–20
IK Fredensborg Oslo (Norway)	34–33	(Bulgaria) Sportist Kremikovtzi	20–14	14–19
KFUM Fredericia (Denmark)	42–31	(Finland) Sparta Helsinki	26–11	16–20

=== Semifinals ===
Team 1	Agg.	Team 2	1st leg	2nd leg
Borac Banja Luka (Socialist Federal Republic of Yugoslavia)	31–29	(Germany) VfL Gummersbach	15–13	16–16
KFUM Fredericia (Denmark)	43–33	(Norway) IK Fredensborg Oslo	21–16	22–17

=== Final ===
Team 1	Score	Team 2
Borac Banja Luka (Socialist Federal Republic of Yugoslavia)	17–15	(Denmark) KFUM Fredericia

== Winner's squad ==
The squad of Borac Banja Luka, 1976 European Champions, was Milorad Karalić, Zdravko Rađenović, Nedeljko Vujinović, Abas Arslanagić, Dobrivoje Selec, Momir Golić, Nebojša Popović, Miro Bjelić, Zoran Ravlić, Boro Golić, Rade Unčanin, Slobodan Vukša, Mile Kekerović, Zlatko Jančić. Coach: Pero Janjić.
