= RK Derventa =

- Full name: Rukometni Klub Derventa
- Founded: 1947
- Arena: Sportska Dvorana Derventa
- Capacity: 3,000
- Head coach: Zoran Dokić
- Club colours
Home	Away

Rukometni klub Derventa (Serbian Cyrillic: Рукометни клуб Дервента) is a handball club from Derventa, Republika Srpska, Bosnia and Herzegovina. Currently, RK Derventa competes in the Handball Championship of Bosnia and Herzegovina and the Handball Cup of Bosnia and Herzegovina.

== Recent seasons ==
The recent season-by-season performance of the club:

Season	Division	Tier	Position
2020–21	Premier League	I	15th ↓

Key

↑ Promoted	↓ Relegated
