= HRK Katarina =

Women's handball team

HRK Katarina Mostar
- Full name: Hrvatski rukometni klub Katarina Mostar
- Short name: HRK Katarina Mostar
- Founded: 1992; 33 years ago
- Arena: Bijeli Brijeg Arena
- League: Premier League
- 2020–21: 10th
Home	Away

Hrvatski rukometni klub Katarina Mostar (English: Croat Handball Club Katarina Mostar) is a women's handball team from the city of Mostar, Bosnia and Herzegovina.

The club plays in the Handball Championship of Bosnia and Herzegovina. The clubs greatest success are two Handball Cup of Bosnia and Herzegovina titles.

== Honours ==
- Handball Cup of Bosnia and Herzegovina:
  - Winners (2): 2007, 2011

== European record ==
Season	Competition	Round	Club	1st leg	2nd leg	Aggregate
2011–12	European Cup	R2	(France) Toulon Saint-Cyr Var Handball	16–28	16–43	32–71

== Recent seasons ==
The recent season-by-season performance of the club:

Season	Division	Tier	Position
2014–15	Premier League	I	3rd
2015–16	Premier League	I	10th
2016–17	Premier League	I	7th
2017–18	Premier League	I	10th
2018–19	Premier League	I	9th
2019–20	Premier League	I	9th
2020–21	Premier League	I	10th

== Notable players ==
- (Croatia) Ćamila Mičijević

== Coaching history ==
- Sanja Bajgorić
