= Handball Federation of Bosnia and Herzegovina =

Governing body of handball in Bosnia and Herzegovina

Handball Federation of Bosnia and Herzegovina RS BiH
- Sport: Handball

History
- Year of formation: 1948
- Year of disbandment: 2025

Affiliations
- International federation: International Handball Federation (IHF)
- IHF member since: 1996
- Continental association: European Handball Federation
- National Olympic Committee: Olympic Committee of Bosnia and Herzegovina
- Other affiliation(s): Mediterranean Handball Confederation

Handball Federation of Bosnia and Herzegovina (Bosnian, Croatian and Serbian: Rukometni savez Bosne i Hercegovine /Рукометни савез Босне и Херцеговине) was the highest handball governing body in the country. It organized the Handball Championship of Bosnia and Herzegovina and Handball Cup of Bosnia and Herzegovina.

It also organized the matches of the Bosnia and Herzegovina men's national handball team. That included men and women, and youth teams as well.

== History ==
The Handball Federation was founded in 1948, and was part of the Yugoslav Handball Federation. When Bosnia and Herzegovina gained independence in 1992, it became the national handball governing body, and later a member of European Handball Federation (1995) and International Handball Federation (1996).

Handball is the most popular sport in Bosnia and Herzegovina after football and basketball. There is a big number of clubs all over the country. Many Bosnian clubs were members of a very strong Yugoslav league, and RK Borac Banja Luka won the EHF Champions League in the 1975–76 season.
Another team from the country that was famous in European competitions is Sloga from Doboj.
