= ŽRK Borac =

Handball club in Bosnia and Herzegovina

- Full name: Ženski rukometni klub Borac
- Nickname(s): Osice (The Wasps)
- Founded: 1955; 70 years ago
- Arena: Borik Sports Hall, Banja Luka
- Capacity: 5,000
- League: Handball Championship of Bosnia and Herzegovina
- 2020–21: 1st
Home	Away

Ženski rukometni klub Borac (Serbian Cyrillic: Женски рукометни клуб Борац) is a handball club from Banja Luka, Republika Srpska, Bosnia and Herzegovina. It is part of the Borac sports society. The club competes in the Handball Championship of Bosnia and Herzegovina. With seven national titles won, it is one of the most successful teams in the country.

== Honours ==
- Handball Championship of Bosnia and Herzegovina:
  - Winners (7): 2007, 2008, 2009, 2010, 2011, 2012, 2021
- First League of Republika Srpska:
  - Winners (1): 2019
- Handball Cup of Bosnia and Herzegovina:
  - Winners (7): 2004, 2008, 2009, 2010, 2012, 2013, 2021

== Recent seasons ==
The recent season-by-season performance of the club:

Season	Division	Tier	Position
2014–15	Premier League	I	11th ↓
2015–16	Prva liga RS	II	3rd
2016–17	Prva liga RS	II	10th
2017–18	Prva liga RS	II	6th
2018–19	Prva liga RS	II	1st ↑
2019–20	Premier League	I	6th
2020–21	Premier League	I	1st

Key

↑ Promoted	↓ Relegated

== Coaching history ==
- Nikola Bijelić
- Rade Unčanin

== Women's Team ==
Borac also has a women's team, who will be taking part in the 2023–24 Women's EHF European Cup.
