= RK Sloboda Tuzla =

RK Sloboda
- Full name: Rukometni Klub Sloboda Tuzla
- Founded: 1959; 67 years ago
- Arena: SKPC Mejdan
- Capacity: 4,900
- President: Ismar Šabović
- Head coach: Mirko Mikić
- League: Handball Championship of Bosnia and Herzegovina
- Club colours
Home	Away

Rukometni Klub Sloboda Tuzla, commonly abbreviated as RK Sloboda Tuzla is a team handball club based in Tuzla, Bosnia and Herzegovina. It is part of the RSD Sloboda Tuzla.

It plays its home games in Mejdan, Tuzla. The clubs greatest success are three Handball Championship of Bosnia and Herzegovina titles.

== History ==
Club was founded in 1959 as charter of RSD Sloboda Tuzla. Since its foundation the club's sponsor has been the local salt factory called Solana. Club has played first international match since Bosnia and Herzegovina has gained independence. In season 2016/2017 it competed in League of Federation of Bosnia and Herzegovina following relegation from Handball Championship of Bosnia and Herzegovina in season 2015/2016.

== Honours ==
=== Domestic competitions ===
==== League ====
- Handball Championship of Bosnia and Herzegovina:
  - Winners (3): 1994, 1995, 1996
- First League of Federation of Bosnia and Herzegovina – North:
  - Winners (1): 2018

==== Cups ====
- Handball Cup of Bosnia and Herzegovina:
  - Winners (4): 1994, 1996, 2020, 2021

== Recent seasons ==
The recent season-by-season performance of the club:

Season	Division	Tier	Position
2005–06	First League FBiH – North	II	1st ↑
2006–07	Premier League	I	15th ↓
2010–11	Premier League	I	9th
2014–15	Premier League	I	9th
2015–16	Premier League	I	15th ↓
2017–18	First League FBiH – North	II	5th
2018–19	First League FBiH – North	II	1st ↑
2019–20	Premier League	I	8th
2020–21	Premier League	I	4th
2021–22	Premier League	I	2nd
2022–23	Premier League	I	5th
2023–24	Premier League	I	5th
2024–25	Premier League	I	7th

Key

↑ Promoted	↓ Relegated

== Team ==
=== Staff ===
Staff for the 2020–21 season

Pos.	Name
General manager	(Bosnia and Herzegovina) Ismar Šabović
Head coach	(Bosnia and Herzegovina) Mirko Mikić
Assistant coach	(Bosnia and Herzegovina) Nedim Đug
Goalkeeping coach	(Bosnia and Herzegovina) Damir Cipurković
Physiotherapist	(Bosnia and Herzegovina) Demir Galić
Doctor	(Bosnia and Herzegovina) Džana Atlić

=== Current squad ===
Squad for the 2020–21 season

Goalkeepers

- 99 (Bosnia and Herzegovina) Milenko Jelić
- 11 (Bosnia and Herzegovina) Sidik Omerović
- 1 (Bosnia and Herzegovina) Zdravko Čajić

Left wingers

- 7 (Bosnia and Herzegovina) Enes Skopljak

Right wingers

- 2 (Bosnia and Herzegovina) Omar Karahodžić

Line players

- 17 (Croatia) Marko Pedić
- 61 (Bosnia and Herzegovina) Ermin Jusić
- 6 (Bosnia and Herzegovina) Semir Memić
- 6 (Bosnia and Herzegovina) Darko Ilić

Left backs

- 69 (Russia) Rashid Kayumov
- 39 (Bosnia and Herzegovina) Arnad Hamzić
- 25 (Bosnia and Herzegovina) Bakir Pirić
- 9 (Bosnia and Herzegovina) Harun Djana

Central backs

- 4 (Bosnia and Herzegovina) Adi Omeragić
- 5 (Bosnia and Herzegovina) Amer Denjo
- 4 (North Macedonia) Jovan Talevski
- 7 (Bosnia and Herzegovina) Mirza Jusufović
- 94 (Bosnia and Herzegovina) Sedžad Abdurahmanović
- 23 (Bosnia and Herzegovina) Kerim Torlaković

Right backs

- 10 (Bosnia and Herzegovina) Emir Suhonjić (c)
- 19 (Bosnia and Herzegovina) Dino Mehić
- 15 (Bosnia and Herzegovina) Harun Đulić

== Coaching history ==
- (Socialist Federal Republic of Yugoslavia) Srđan Praljak (1986–1991)
- (Bosnia and Herzegovina) Damir Cipurković ( – February 19, 2009)
- (Bosnia and Herzegovina) Mirza Bulić (August 5, 2018 – October 26, 2019)
- (Bosnia and Herzegovina) Nedžad Mašić (October 26, 2019 – January 3, 2020)
- (Bosnia and Herzegovina) Davor Kadić (January 6, 2020 – present)
