= HŽRK Zrinjski Mostar =

Handball club in Mostar, Bosnia and Herzegovina

- Full name: Hrvatski ženski rukometni klub Zrinjski Mostar
- Nickname: Plemkinje (The Noblewomen)
- Short name: HŽRK Zrinjski Mostar
- Founded: 1992; 34 years ago
- League: Premier League
- 2020–21: 9th
- Club colours
Home	Away

HŽRK Zrinjski Mostar (Croatian: Hrvatski ženski rukometni klub Zrinjski Mostar, English: Croat Women's Handball Club Zrinjski Mostar) is a Croat-founded women's handball team from the city of Mostar, Bosnia and Herzegovina.

The club plays in the Handball Championship of Bosnia and Herzegovina. It is part of the Zrinjski Mostar sport society. It has been one of the most successful women's handball clubs in the country since the formation of the national league in 2001.

Fans of HŽRK Zrinjski are known as Ultras.

== History ==
The club was founded by Bosnian Croats in 1992. The team dominated women's handball in Herzeg-Bosnia. From 1994 to 2001, they won eight titles, also winning three titles in the playoffs of the Championship of Bosnia and Herzegovina. In 2001 a new united national league was formed with Zrinjski winning the inaugural season.

Season 2012-13 was very successful for the team with the title returning to Mostar. In European competitions, Zrinjski played in the quarterfinals of the EHF Challenge Cup, which was a historic success for the club, and for women's handball in Bosnia and Herzegovina.

== Honours ==
- Handball Championship of Bosnia and Herzegovina:
  - Winners (7): 1998, 1999, 2000, 2002, 2005, 2006, 2013
  - Runner-up (2): 2003, 2004
- Handball Cup of Bosnia and Herzegovina:
  - Runner-up (1): 2012
- First League of Federation of Bosnia and Herzegovina:
  - Winners (1): 2019
- Herzeg-Bosnia Championship:
  - Winners (8): 1994, 1995, 1996, 1997, 1998, 1999, 2000, 2001
- Cup of Herzeg-Bosnia:
  - Winners (8): 1994, 1995, 1996, 1997, 1998, 1999, 2000, 2001

== European record ==
Season	Competition	Round	Club	1st leg	2nd leg	Aggregate
2013–14	EHF Cup	R2	(Netherlands) VOC Amsterdam	17–34	13–29	30–63

== Recent seasons ==
The recent season-by-season performance of the club:

Season	Division	Tier	Position
2014–15	Premier League	I	4th
2015–16	Premier League	I	11th ↓
2016–17	Prva liga FBiH	II	?
2017–18	Prva liga FBiH	II	4th
2018–19	Prva liga FBiH	II	1st ↑
2019–20	Premier League	I	11th
2020–21	Premier League	I	9th

Key

↑ Promoted	↓ Relegated

== Notable players ==
- (Bosnia and Herzegovina) Ivana Ljubas

== Coaching history ==
- Zvonko Papak
- Ana Papak
- Marijana Arapović
- Tina Biokšić
- Antun Pavlović
- Zlata Zubac
- Ivana Mlakić
- Krunoslav Špec
- Milenko Avdalović
- Robert Grgić
