= Muhamed Zulfić =

Bosnian handball player

Personal information
- Born: 13 May 1992 (age 34) Sarajevo, Bosnia and Herzegovina
- Height: 1.88 m (6 ft 2 in)

Sport
- Sport: Handball
- Position: Right wing
- Current club: RK Vogošća
- Number: 44

Senior clubs
- Years: Team
- –2015: (Bosnia and Herzegovina) RK Bosna Sarajevo
- 2015–2016: (Romania) Dinamo București
- 2016–2017: (Greece) Filippos Veria
- 2017–2018: (Turkey) MYK Hentbol SK
- 2018–2020: (Romania) Dinamo București
- 2021–2023: (Bosnia and Herzegovina) RK Bosna Sarajevo
- 2023-: (Bosnia and Herzegovina) RK Vogošća Poljine Hills
National team
Years	Team	Apps	(Gls)
–	Bosnia and Herzegovina	4	(4)

Muhamed Zulfić (born 13 May 1992) is a Bosnian handball player who plays for Dinamo București and the Bosnia and Herzegovina national team.
