= HŽRK Grude =

Handball club in Grude, Bosnia and Herzegovina

- Full name: Hrvatski Ženski rukometni klub Grude
- Founded: 2009.; 17 years ago
- Arena: Dvorana Bili Brig Grude
- Capacity: 2,000
- Head coach: Zlata Zubac
- League: Premier League
- 2020–21: 3rd
- Club colours
Home	Away

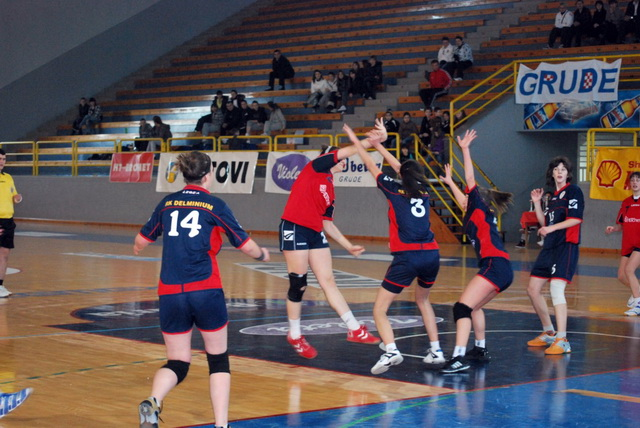
HŽRK Grude vs. RK Delminium 2011

Hrvatski ženski rukometni klub Grude (transl. Croat Female Handball Club Grude), commonly referred to as HŽRK Grude or simply Grude, is a women's handball club from Grude, Bosnia and Herzegovina. HŽRK Grude competes in the Handball Championship of Bosnia and Herzegovina.

== History ==
HŽRK Grude was founded in August 2009. The team played its first senior league game on 09.10.2010. in the First League of the Federation of Bosnia and Herzegovina (Second tier). In the 2013–14 season it was promoted to the top division.

== Arena ==
The team plays its home games in Bili Brig Arena which has the capacity of around 2,000.

== Honours ==
=== Domestic competitions ===
==== League ====
- Handball Championship of Bosnia and Herzegovina:
  - Winners (6): 2015, 2016, 2017, 2018, 2019, 2020
- First League of the Federation of Bosnia and Herzegovina:
  - Winners (1): 2013

==== Cups ====
- Handball Cup of Bosnia and Herzegovina:
  - Winners (4): : 2015, 2016, 2019, 2022

== European record ==
Season	Competition	Round	Club	1st leg	2nd leg	Aggregate
2020–21	EHF Cup	Last 16	(Spain) Rocasa Gran Canaria	22–29	18–43	40–72
2020–21	EHF Cup	R3	(Montenegro) ORK Rudar	29–29	30–22	59–51
2018–19	EHF Cup	R1	(Germany) TuS Metzingen	24–43	17–47	41–90
2017–18	EHF Cup	R1	(Romania) CSM Roman	15–40	19–42	34–82
2016–17	EHF Cup	R1	(Romania) ASC Corona 2010 Brasov	16–43	17–40	33–83
2015–16	EHF Cup	R1	(Iceland) Fram	22–38	27–28	49–66

== Recent seasons ==
The recent season-by-season performance of the club:

Season	Division	Tier	Position
2014–15	Premier League	I	1st
2015–16	Premier League	I	1st
2016–17	Premier League	I	1st
2017–18	Premier League	I	1st
2018–19	Premier League	I	1st
2019–20	Premier League	I	1st
2020–21	Premier League	I	3rd

== Club ranking ==
=== EHF coefficient ===
EHF Club Ranking as of 13 July 2021:

- 85 (78) (Germany) TSV Bayer 04 Leverkusen (44)
- 86 (79) (Belarus) HC Gomel (45)
- 87 (92) (Bosnia and Herzegovina) HŽRK Grude (41)
- 88 (81) (France) OGC Nice Handball (43)

== Team ==
=== Current squad ===
Squad for the 2016–17 season

Goalkeepers

- (Croatia) Ana Krizanac
- (Bosnia and Herzegovina) Andjela Milas

Wingers

- (Bosnia and Herzegovina) Matea Bandic
- (Bosnia and Herzegovina) Martina Kraljevic
- (Bosnia and Herzegovina) Andrea Prusina

Line Players

- (Bosnia and Herzegovina) Anita Azinovic
- (Bosnia and Herzegovina) Tina Bandic

Back players

- (Bosnia and Herzegovina) Andjela Boras
- (Bosnia and Herzegovina) Josipa Bracic
- (Bosnia and Herzegovina) Nikolina Cutura
- (Bosnia and Herzegovina) Ana Kondza
- (Croatia) Amanda Maric
- (Bosnia and Herzegovina) Klara Mikulic
- (Bosnia and Herzegovina) Ana Nikic
- (Bosnia and Herzegovina) Lucina Zulj
