= RK Vogošća =

Bosnian handball team

- Full name: Rukometni klub Vogošća
- Founded: 1960; 66 years ago
- Arena: Sportska Dvorana Amel Bečković
- Capacity: 3,000
- Head coach: Sanjin Kolaković
- League: Premijer Liga
- 2023–24: 5th
- Club colours
| Home | Away |

RK Vogošća (Serbian Cyrillic: Рукометни клуб Вогошћа) is a Bosnian handball team located in Vogošća. Their home matches are played at Sportska Dvorana Amel Bečković. RK Vogošća competes in the Handball Championship of Bosnia and Herzegovina and the Handball Cup of Bosnia and Herzegovina.

Location of RK Vogošća

== History ==
The club was founded in 1960 under the name RK Partizan. It will soon change its name to RK Unis. It took its current name in 2005. The club won the Handball Cup of Bosnia and Herzegovina twice: in 2016 and 2023.

== Crest, colours, supporters ==
=== Kits ===
HOME

2022–23

AWAY

2022–23

== Team ==
=== Current squad ===
Squad for the 2024–25 season

RK Vogošća

Goalkeepers

- 1 (Bosnia and Herzegovina) Kenan Mutapčić
- 12 (Bosnia and Herzegovina) Nedim Cakaj
- 16 (Bosnia and Herzegovina) Stefan Trapara

Left Wingers

- 7 (Bosnia and Herzegovina) Haris Đapo
- 17 (Bosnia and Herzegovina) Ibro Jelačić

Right Wingers

- 4 (Montenegro) Fahrudin Melić
- 27 (Bosnia and Herzegovina) Medin Šestan
- 44 (Bosnia and Herzegovina) Muhamed Zulfić

Line Players

- 14 (Bosnia and Herzegovina) Amer Demirović

Left Backs

- 5 (United States) Amar Amitović
- 24 (Bosnia and Herzegovina) Šerif Baraković
- 29 (Bosnia and Herzegovina) Mahir Burić

Central Backs

- 8 (Bosnia and Herzegovina) Harun Hadžić
- 10 (Bosnia and Herzegovina) Faris Rujanac
- 33 (Bosnia and Herzegovina) Amar Herić

Right Backs

- 15 (Bosnia and Herzegovina) Elis Memić

=== Technical staff ===
- Head coach: (Bosnia and Herzegovina) Sanjin Kolaković
- Goalkeeping coach: (Bosnia and Herzegovina) Enid Tahirović
- Physiotherapist: (Bosnia and Herzegovina) Kenan Zagić

=== Transfers ===
Transfers for the 2023–24 season

Joining

Leaving

== Honours ==
- Handball Championship of Bosnia and Herzegovina:
  - Runner-Up (2): 2016, 2018
- Handball Cup of Bosnia and Herzegovina:
  - Winners (2): 2016, 2023

== EHF ranking ==
As of 5/12/2025

| Rank | Team | Points |
|---|---|---|
| 118 | (Israel) Holon Yuvalym | 38 |
| 119 | (Latvia) ZRHK Dobele | 36 |
| 120 | (Sweden) Alingsås HK | 36 |
| 121 | (Bosnia and Herzegovina) RK Vogošća | 35 |
| 122 | (Serbia) RK Metaloplastika Sabac | 35 |
| 123 | (Italy) Junior Fasano | 35 |
| 124 | (Romania) CSM București | 35 |

== Former club members ==
=== Notable former players ===
- (Bosnia and Herzegovina) Alen Ovčina (2015–2016)
- (Bosnia and Herzegovina) Adnan Šabanović (2015–2018)
- (Bosnia and Herzegovina) Faruk Vražalić (2014)
- (Bosnia and Herzegovina) Muhamed Zulfić (2023-)
