= RK Gračanica =

Bosnian handball club

- Full name: Rukometni Klub Gračanica
- Founded: 1956.; 70 years ago
- Arena: GD Luke
- Capacity: 1,500
- Head coach: Amar Čavčić
- League: Handball Championship of Bosnia and Herzegovina
- 2019–20: 2nd
- Club colours
Home	Away

RK Gračanica (Bosnian: Muški Rukometni Klub Gračanica, English: Men's Handball Club Gračanica) is a professional handball club from Gračanica, Bosnia and Herzegovina. The club competes in the Handball Championship of Bosnia and Herzegovina, and the EHF European Cup.

== History ==
The club was founded in 1956, and started competing in 1958.

== Sponsorship naming ==
The club has had several denominations through the years due to sponsorship:

- Gračanica FERING (1998/99)
- Gračanica INDEX (2001/02)

== Team ==
=== Current squad ===
Squad for the 2025–26 season

RK Gračanica

Goalkeepers
Left Wingers
Right Wingers
Line Players

Left Backs
Central Backs
Right Backs

=== Transfers ===
Transfers for the 2025–26 season

Joining

Leaving

- (Bosnia and Herzegovina) Adnan Isakovic (CB) to (Slovenia) RK Krško
- (Bosnia and Herzegovina) Adi Omeragić (LB) to (Austria) HSG Bärnbach/Köflach

== Honours ==
=== Domestic competitions ===
- Handball Championship of Bosnia and Herzegovina:
  - Winners (1): 2001
- First League of Federation of Bosnia and Herzegovina – North:
  - Winners (1): 2017/18

== European record ==
Season	Competition	Round	Club	1st leg	2nd leg	Aggregate
2024–25	EHF European Cup	R2	(Slovenia) RK Celje Pivovarna Laško	35–43	26–33	61–76
2022–23	EHF European Cup	R1	(Kosovo) Kastrioti	36–22	36–22	72–44
2022–23	EHF European Cup	R2	(Azerbaijan) HC Baku	33–17	37–28	70–45
2022–23	EHF European Cup	R3	(Czech Republic) HCB Karviná	18–22	27–33	45–55
2020–21	EHF European Cup	R2	(Ukraine) Odessa	28–22	26–30	54–52
2020–21	EHF European Cup	R3	(Israel) Holon	10–0		
2020–21	EHF European Cup	L16	(Russia) HC Neva SPb	21–33	23–25	44–58
2019–20	EHF Challenge Cup	R3	(Czech Republic) HC Dukla Prague	21–26	20–21	41–47
2002–03	EHF Challenge Cup	R3	(Denmark) Aalborg Håndbold	25–23	22–39	47–62
2001–02	EHF Champions League	R1	(Ukraine) ZTR Zaporizhzhia	20–32	17–32	37–64
2001–02	EHF Cup	R2	(Germany) THW Kiel	20–40	16–31	36–71
1998–99	EHF Cup	1/16	(Sweden) Lugi HF	25–24	22–28	47–52

== Recent seasons ==
The recent season-by-season performance of the club:

Season	Division	Tier	Position
2017–18	First League FBiH – North	II	1st ↑
2018–19	Premier League	I	2nd
2019–20	Premier League	I	2nd
2020–21	Premier League	I	6th
2021–22	Premier League	I	4th
2022–23	Premier League	I	4th
2023–24	Premier League	I	3rd
2024–25	Premier League	I	11th

Key

↑ Promoted	↓ Relegated
