= Fahrudin Melić =

Montenegrin handball player (born 1984)

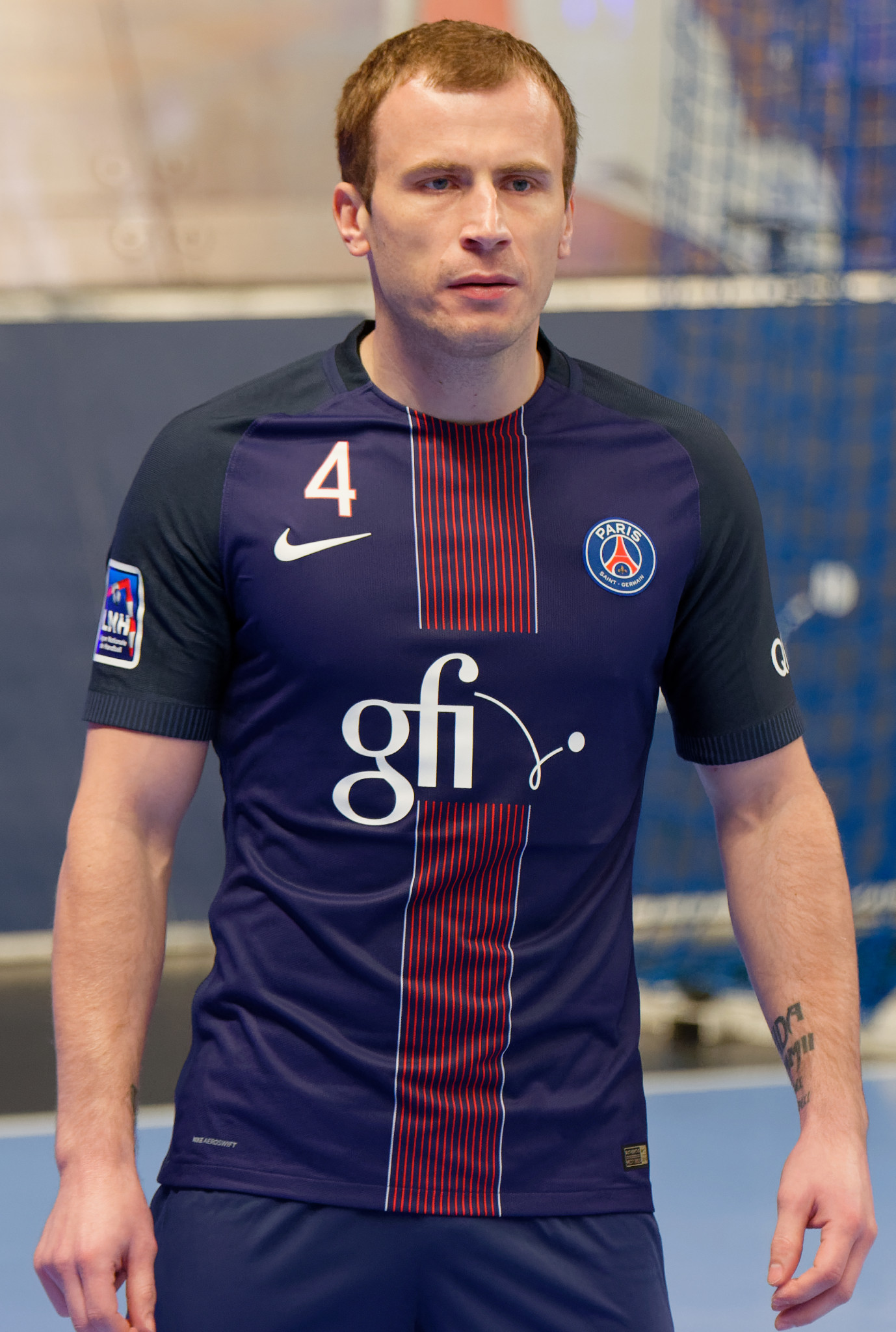
- Last match with PSG Handball, Jun. 2, 2016.

Personal information
- Nationality: Montenegrin
- Born: 22 July 1984 (age 42) Prijepolje, SR Serbia, SFR Yugoslavia
- Height: 1.83 m (6 ft 0 in)

Sport
- Sport: Handball
- Position: Right wing
- Current club: RK Izviđač Ljubuški
- Number: 44
National team
Years	Team	Apps	(Gls)
–	Montenegro	38	(131)

Fahrudin Melić (born 22 July 1984) is a Montenegrin handballer who currently plays for RK Izviđač Ljubuški and the Montenegrin national team.
