= ŽRK Mira Prijedor =

- Full name: Ženski rukometni klub Mira Prijedor
- Founded: 1982; 43 years ago
- Arena: Hall Mladost
- League: Premier League
- 2020–2021: 5th

Ženski rukometni klub Mira Prijedor is a women's handball club from Prijedor in Bosnia and Herzegovina. It currently competes in the Premier League, the top tier volleyball league of Bosnia and Herzegovina.

== Honours ==
- Handball Championship of Bosnia and Herzegovina:
  - Winners (1): 2014

== European record ==
Season	Competition	Round	Club	Home	Away	Aggregate
2016–17	Challenge Cup	R3	(Netherlands) Virto/Quintus	19–46	21–44	40–90

== Recent seasons ==
The recent season-by-season performance of the club:

Season	Division	Tier	Position
2020–21	Premier League	I	5th
