= RK Borac Banja Luka =

Bosnian handball team

RK Borac
- Full name: Rukometni klub Borac M:tel Banja Luka
- Founded: 1950
- Arena: Borik Sports Hall, Banja Luka
- Capacity: 5,000
- President: Saša Kondić
- Head coach: Irfan Smajlagić
- League: Handball Championship of Bosnia and Herzegovina
- 2020–21: 2nd
Home	Away

Rukometni klub Borac Banja Luka (Serbian Cyrillic: Рукометни клуб Бopaц Бања Лука) is a handball club from Banja Luka, Republika Srpska, Bosnia and Herzegovina. It is part of the Borac sports society.

The federal league of Yugoslavia was founded in 1957. The handball club Borac became its member and since then was competing in the league until the disintegration of SFR Yugoslavia in 1992. Borac was the champion of SFR Yugoslavia seven times between 1959 and 1981.

In addition, RK Borac Banja Luka had won the Cup of Republika Srpska twelve times between 1993 and 2013. The Cup competition did not take place in 1995 because of war activities.

The following players were crowned the European Champions in 1976: Milorad Karalić, Zdravko Rađenović, Nedeljko Vujinović, Abas Arslanagić, Dobrivoje Selec, Momir Golić, Nebojša Popović, Miro Bjelić, Zoran Ravlić, Boro Golić, Rade Unčanin, Slobodan Vukša, Mile Kekerović, Zlatko Jančić. Coach: Pero Janjić.

== Accomplishments ==
=== Domestic ===
Yugoslavia – 17

- Yugoslav Handball Championship:
  - Winners (7): 1959, 1960, 1973, 1974, 1975, 1976, 1981
- Yugoslav Handball Cup:
  - Winners (10): 1957, 1958, 1961, 1969, 1972, 1973, 1974, 1975, 1979, 1992

Bosnia and Herzegovina – 14

- Handball Championship of Bosnia and Herzegovina:
  - Winners (6): 2013, 2014, 2015, 2017, 2020, 2022
- Handball Cup of Bosnia and Herzegovina:
  - Winners (8): 2007, 2011, 2013, 2014, 2015, 2018, 2019, 2024

Republika Srpska (Regional championship) – 21

- First League of Republika Srpska:
  - Winners (8): 1994, 1995, 1996, 1997, 1998, 1999, 2000, 2001
- Cup of Republika Srpska:
  - Winners (13): 1993, 1994, 1996, 1997, 1998, 1999, 2000, 2001, 2009, 2010, 2012, 2013, 2018

=== European ===
European titles – 2

- European Champions Cup:
  - Winners (1): 1975–76
  - Runner-up (1): 1974–75
- EHF Cup:
  - Winners (1): 1990–91

== Recent seasons ==
The recent season-by-season performance of the club:

Season	Division	Tier	Position
2020–21	Premier League	I	2nd
