= RK Leotar =

Bosnian handball team

- Full name: Rukometni klub Leotar
- Founded: 1956; 70 years ago
- Arena: Sportska Dvorana Miloš Mrdić, Trebinje
- Capacity: 2,000
- League: Premijer Liga
- Club colours

Rukometni klub Leotar (Serbian Cyrillic: Рукометни клуб Леотар) is a Bosnian handball club from Trebinje, that plays in the Premijer Liga.

Location of RK Leotar

== Team ==
=== Current squad ===
Squad for the 2023–24 season

RK Leotar

Goalkeepers

- 1 (Bosnia and Herzegovina) Veselin Savović
- 12 (Bosnia and Herzegovina) Radovan Turnić
- 16 (Bosnia and Herzegovina) Dusan Berdović
- 99 (Serbia) Miloš Knežević

Left Wingers

- 3 (Bosnia and Herzegovina) Dimitrije Veraja
- 14 (Serbia) Djordje Kukić

Right Wingers

- 13 (Bosnia and Herzegovina) Marko Parežanin
- 18 (Bosnia and Herzegovina) Marko Andjusić
- 20 (Bosnia and Herzegovina) Ivan Petrović
- 29 (Bosnia and Herzegovina) Nikola Mićević

Line Players

- 5 (Bosnia and Herzegovina) Milomir Ninković
- 11 (Bosnia and Herzegovina) Djordje Ratković
- 24 (Bosnia and Herzegovina) Radovan Uljarević

Left Backs

- 9 (Bosnia and Herzegovina) Aleksa Ninković
- 17 (Serbia) Nenad Todorov
- 23 (Bosnia and Herzegovina) Patrik Pavicić
- 33 (Serbia) Nemanja Dimitrijević

Central Backs

- 8 (Bosnia and Herzegovina) Igor Turnić
- 10 (Montenegro) Vladimir Stanković
- 15 (Bosnia and Herzegovina) Andrej Parežanin

Right Backs

- 7 (Bosnia and Herzegovina) Aleksandar Milojević
- 22 (Bosnia and Herzegovina) Božo Tepić

=== Technical staff ===
- Head coach: (Montenegro) Dragiša Koracevic
- Physiotherapist: (Bosnia and Herzegovina) Snežana Runjevac

=== Transfers ===
Transfers for the 2025–26 season

Joining

Leaving

- (Serbia) Vladan Arizanović (CB) to (Slovenia) RK Ajdovščina
- (Serbia) Željko Šukić (LB) to (Romania) HC Buzău
- (Serbia) Miloš Knežević (GK) to (Bosnia and Herzegovina) RK Izviđač
- (Bosnia and Herzegovina) Mirko Mišetić (LW) to (Bosnia and Herzegovina) RK Izviđač
- (Bosnia and Herzegovina) Djordje Ratković (LP) to (Slovenia) MRK Krka

== EHF ranking ==
As of 5/12/2025

Rank	Team	Points
83	(France) Saint-Raphaël Var Handball	63
84	(Serbia) Dinamo Pančevo	60
85	(Slovakia) MŠK Považská Bystrica	59
86	(Bosnia and Herzegovina) RK Leotar	59
87	(Slovenia) Jeruzalem Ormož	56
88	(Germany) TBV Lemgo	56
89	(North Macedonia) HC Ohrid 2013	55

== Notable former players ==
- (Bosnia and Herzegovina) Petar Jokanović (2010–2013)
- (Montenegro) Aleksandar Glendža (2018–2019)
