= Handball Championship of Bosnia and Herzegovina =

Sports league

Handball Championship of Bosnia and Herzegovina Premijer liga Bosne i Hercegovine
- Current season, competition or edition: 2025–26 Handball Championship of Bosnia and Herzegovina
- Sport: Handball
- Founded: 2001
- No. of teams: 14 (Men) 12 (Women)
- Country: Bosnia and Herzegovina
- Confederation: EHF
- Most recent champions: Izviđač (11th title) (Men); Grude (7th title) (Women)
- Most titles: Izviđač (11 titles) (Men); Borac (7 titles) (Women); Zrinjski (7 titles) (Women); Grude (7th title) (Women)
- International cups: EHF Cup; EHF Challenge Cup

The Handball Championship of Bosnia and Herzegovina is the top handball league in Bosnia and Herzegovina. The league is operated by the Handball Federation of Bosnia and Herzegovina and is composed of 16 teams. The champion is seeded into the EHF Champions League. Second team is seeded into EHF Cup, while third and fourth teams go to EHF Challenge Cup. The winner of the league cup is seeded into the EHF Cup Winner's Cup.

== Premier handball league for men ==
=== 2025–26 Season participants ===
The following 14 clubs compete in the Handball Premier League during the 2025–26 season.

Locations of the 2025–26 Handball Premier League of Bosnia and Herzegovina teams

Team	City	Arena
Borac	Banja Luka	JUSC Borik
Bosna	Visoko	Sport Centre Mladost
Derventa	Derventa	SD Derventa
Goražde	Goražde	SD Mirsad Hurić
Gračanica	Gračanica	Sportska dvorana "Luke"
Izviđač	Ljubuški	Sports Hall Ljubuški
Konjuh	Živinice	SD Živinice
Krivaja	Zavidovići	SD Zavidovići
Leotar	Trebinje	Sportska dvorana "Miloš Mrdić"
Maglaj	Maglaj	SD Pobjeda
Sloboda	Tuzla	SKPC Mejdan
Sloga	Doboj	Dvorana Srednjoškolskog Centra Doboj
Vogošća	Vogošća	Sportska Dvorana Amel Bečković
Zrinjski	Mostar	SD Bijeli Brijeg

=== EHF coefficients ===
Country ranking

EHF League Ranking for 2018/19 season:

- 30. (28) (Estonia) Meistriliiga (6.83)
- 31. (29) (Kosovo) Superliga (5.50)
- **32.** (32) (Bosnia and Herzegovina) **Premier league** (5.25)
- 33. (33) (Italy) Serie A (4.00)
- 34. (34) (Bulgaria) GHR A (3.33)

Club ranking

EHF Club Ranking as of 25 September 2025:

- 42. (41) Izviđač (110)
- 77. (120) Leotar (60)
- 90. (78) Sloboda (50)
- 120. (140) Vogošća (33)
- 154. (136) Gračanica (22)

=== List of champions ===
The United Premier League was started in 2001. Until that year, in Bosnia, there were three separate federations and championships. The EHF recognized as official only the Handball Federation of Bosnia and Herzegovina based in Sarajevo.

In years 1998 and 1999 playoffs were held, with teams competing from Federation based in Sarajevo, and Handball Federation of Herzeg-Bosnia. In 2001 clubs from Republika Srpska and their Federation participated, and for the first time after Bosnian War, clubs from all of Bosnia and Herzegovina were competing with each other. Sadly, next year, in 2001 clubs from Republika Srpska refused to play, and therefore playoffs were not played. Only in 2002 was this drama of Bosnian handball ended. In 2001 united Premier league of Bosnia and Herzegovina started, which was a turning point for better quality of teams in years to come.

Year	Handball Federation B&H	Republika Srpska	Herzeg-Bosnia	Play-off
1994	**Sloboda Solana Tuzla**	Borac Banja Luka	-	-
1995	**Sloboda Solana Tuzla**	Borac Banja Luka	Izviđač Ljubuški	-
1996	**Sloboda Solana Tuzla**	Borac Banja Luka	Izviđač Ljubuški	-
1997	**Bosna Visoko**	Borac Banja Luka	Izviđač Ljubuški	-
1998	Borac Travnik	Borac Banja Luka	Izviđač Ljubuški	**Borac Travnik**
1999	Bosna Visoko	Borac Banja Luka	Izviđač Ljubuški	**Bosna Visoko**
2000	Željezničar Sarajevo	Borac Banja Luka	Izviđač Ljubuški	**Izviđač Ljubuški**
2001	**Gračanica**	Borac Banja Luka	Izviđač Ljubuški	Not played

Note: Till united league, only Handball Federation of B&H was officially recognized by European Handball Federation, and also International Handball Federation. Bolded teams were declared as official winners of Premier league of Bosnia and Herzegovina.

Champions of united Premier league of Bosnia and Herzegovina which started from 2001.

‡ League champions also won the Bosnia and Herzegovina Handball Cup, i.e. the domestic Double.

- 2001–2002 HRK Izviđač ‡
- 2002–2003 RK Bosna Sarajevo ‡
- 2003–2004 HRK Izviđač (2)
- 2004–2005 HRK Izviđač (3)
- 2005–2006 RK Bosna Sarajevo (2)
- 2006–2007 RK Bosna Sarajevo (3)
- 2007–2008 RK Bosna Lido osiguranje ‡ (4)
- 2008–2009 RK Bosna Sunce osiguranje ‡ (5)
- 2009–2010 RK Bosna BH Gas ‡ (6)
- 2010–2011 RK Bosna BH Gas (7)
- 2011–2012 RK Sloga Mobis
- 2012–2013 RK Borac m:tel ‡
- 2013–2014 RK Borac m:tel ‡ (2)
- 2014–2015 RK Borac m:tel ‡ (3)
- 2015–2016 HRK Izviđač (4)
- 2016–2017 RK Borac m:tel (4)
- 2017–2018 HRK Izviđač (5)
- 2018–2019 HRK Izviđač (6)
- 2019–2020 RK Borac m:tel (5)
- 2020–2021 HRK Izviđač (7)
- 2021–2022 RK Borac m:tel (6)
- 2022–2023 HRK Izviđač Agram (8)
- 2023–2024 HRK Izviđač Agram (9)
- 2024–2025 HRK Izviđač Agram ‡ (10)
- 2025–2026 Izviđač (11)

=== Performance by club ===
Club	Titles	Years
HRK Izviđač	12	2000, 2002, 2004, 2005, 2016, 2018, 2019, 2021, 2023, 2024, 2025, 2026
RK Bosna Sarajevo	7	2003, 2006, 2007, 2008, 2009, 2010, 2011
RK Borac Banja Luka	6	2013, 2014, 2015, 2017, 2020, 2022
RK Sloboda Tuzla	3	1994, 1995, 1996
RK Bosna Visoko	2	1997, 1999
RK Sloga Doboj	1	2012
RK Gračanica	1	2001
RK Borac Travnik	1	1998

Including titles in SFR Yugoslavia championship

Club	Titles	Years
RK Borac Banja Luka	13	1959, 1960, 1973, 1974, 1975, 1976, 1981, 2013, 2014, 2015, 2017, 2020, 2022
HRK Izviđač	12	2000, 2002, 2004, 2005, 2016, 2018, 2019, 2021, 2023, 2024, 2025, 2026
RK Bosna Sarajevo	7	2003, 2006, 2007, 2008, 2009, 2010, 2011
RK Sloboda Tuzla	3	1994, 1995, 1996
RK Bosna Visoko	2	1997, 1999
RK Sloga Doboj	1	2012
RK Gračanica	1	2001
RK Borac Travnik	1	1998
RK Željezničar	1	1978

== Premier handball league for women ==
=== 2021-22 Season participants ===
The following 12 clubs compete in the Handball Premier League during the 2021-22 season.

Locations of the 2021–22 Handball Premier League of Bosnia and Herzegovina teams

Team	City	Arena
Zrinjski	Mostar	Bijeli Brijeg Hall
Katarina	Mostar	Bijeli Brijeg Hall
Grude	Grude	Dvorana Bili Brig Grude
Izviđač	Ljubuški	Sports Hall Ljubuški
Borac	Banja Luka	JUSC Borik
Ilidža	Ilidža	KSIRC Hadzici
Krivaja	Zavidovići	Sportska dvorana "Luke"
Hadžići	Hadžići	Gradska Dvorana
Jedinstvo	Brčko	Dvorana Ekonomske skole
Mira	Prijedor	Hall Mladost
Knežopoljka	Kozarska Dubica	
Dubica	Kozarska Dubica	Sportska dvorana Kozarska Dubica

=== EHF coefficients ===
Country ranking

EHF League Ranking for 2020/21 season:

- 24. (24) (Azerbaijan) Premier League (3.33)
- 25. (25) (Ukraine) Super League (1.17)
- **26.** (26) (Bosnia and Herzegovina) **Premier League** (1.00)
- 26. (26) (Cyprus) A1 (1.00)
- 26. (26) (Israel) Ligat Ha'Al (1.00)

Club ranking

EHF Club Ranking as of 12 April 2021:

- 108. (153) HŽRK Grude (41)
- 158. (147) ŽRK Krivaja (19)
- 187. (180) ŽRK Hadžići (11)
- 227. (211) HŽRK Zrinjski Mostar (7)
- 242. (236) ŽRK Ilidža (5)

=== List of champions ===
Year	Handball Federation B&H	Republika Srpska	Herzeg-Bosnia	Play-off
1994	**Jedinstvo, Tuzla**	Boksit, Milići	-	-
1995	**Jedinstvo, Tuzla**	?	?	-
1996	**Jedinstvo, Tuzla**	?	?	-
1997	**Jedinstvo, Tuzla**	?	?	-
1998	Jedinstvo, Tuzla	?	Interinvest, Mostar	**Interinvest, Mostar**
1999	Zmaj od Bosne, Tuzla	?	Interinvest, Mostar	**Interinvest, Mostar**
2000	Jedinstvo, Tuzla	?	Interinvest, Mostar	**Interinvest, Mostar**
2001	**Gorica Iskra, Bugojno**	?	?	Not played

Note: Till united league, only Handball Federation of B&H was officially recognized by European Handball Federation, and also International Handball Federation. Bolded teams were declared as official winners of Premier league of Bosnia and Herzegovina.

Note: Interinvest Mostar merged with HŽRK Zrinjski Mostar

Champions of the united Premier league of Bosnia and Herzegovina which started from 2001.

- 2001–2002 Zrinjski
- 2002–2003 Ljubuški HO, Ljubuški
- 2003–2004 Galeb, Mostar
- 2004–2005 Zrinjski
- 2005–2006 Zrinjski
- 2006–2007 Borac
- 2007–2008 Borac
- 2008–2009 Borac
- 2009–2010 Borac
- 2010–2011 Borac
- 2011–2012 Borac
- 2012–2013 Zrinjski
- 2013–2014 Mira
- 2014–2015 Grude
- 2015–2016 Grude
- 2016–2017 Grude
- 2017–2018 Grude
- 2018–2019 Grude
- 2019–2020 Grude
- 2020-2021 Borac
- 2021–2022 Grude

=== Performance by club ===
Club	Titles	Years
ŽRK Borac	7	2007, 2008, 2009, 2010, 2011, 2012, 2021
HŽRK Zrinjski Mostar	7	1998, 1999, 2000, 2002, 2005, 2006, 2013
HŽRK Grude	7	2015, 2016, 2017, 2018, 2019, 2020, 2022
Jedinstvo Tuzla	4	1994, 1995, 1996, 1997
ŽRK Mira Prijedor	1	2014
Ljubuški HO	1	2003
Galeb	1	2004
ŽRK Gorica Iskra Bugojno	1	2001

== See also ==
- Handball Cup of Bosnia and Herzegovina
