= RK Bosna Visoko =

Bosnian handball club

HC Bosna Visoko
- Full name: Handball club Bosna
- Founded: 1954
- Arena: Sport Centre Mladost
- President: Adnan Delić
- Head coach: Senad Skopljak
- League: Premijer Liga
- 2020–21: 13th
- Club colours
Home	Away

RK Bosna Visoko (Bosnian: Rukometni klub Bosna) is a handball club from Visoko, founded on 9 February 1954. RK Bosna competes in the Handball Championship of Bosnia and Herzegovina and the Handball Cup of Bosnia and Herzegovina.

== History ==
After Ferid Semić brought the first handball ball to Visoko, and when the congress was held on 9 February 1954, sport society Mladost was born. Its founders were Ferid Semić and Vladimir Jolić. The first game was held on 9 May 1954 when Visoko was beaten by Sarajevo by 25:9.

=== Handball club Bosna established ===
On 15 March 1960 club's name Mladost was renamed to Handball Club Bosna. From the autumn of 1962 all games were held at city's asphalted handball playing-field. The most important moment for Visoko's handball team was the arrival of Srđan Praljak: the first real handball coach, who from 1 August 1960 to 31 July 1971 created the characteristic Visoko handball school. This was second generation of players with Nevzad Sirčo at the helm, who was one of the best players in the history of Visoko's handball.

=== First Yugoslav league ===
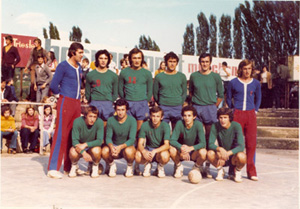
1974 Team that won fourth place in the Yugoslav League

After only four years, Bosna entered the strong First league of Yugoslavia in 1964, and at same time won the Cup of Bosnia and Herzegovina, and runner-up in Cup of Yugoslavia. On 20 May 1970, club was renamed to RK Vitex, after economic giant Vitex, and continued with that name until 1991. The club remained in the First handball league of Yugoslavia for seven years until it was relegated to second in 1971/72 season. This wasn't for long, and after only one year, the club re-entered the first league and achieved its best place ever: fourth in 1974/75 season in one of the best handball leagues of that time. It stayed for two more seasons when Bosna was relegated in 1976 to Second Yugoslav league, which was last season for club in first league. Altogether, Bosna have played 10 seasons in elite Yugoslav handball league, having won 3 times Cup of Bosnia and Herzegovina. Pioneer selection became champions of Yugoslavia in 1971. Juniors were two times runners-up, in 1973 and 1974. Zdenko Antović became standard player for Yugoslavian national handball team in 1976, 1977 and 1979, other players like Kemal Vražić and Ranko Antović didn't stay for long.

=== Decline ===
At around this time, the game of handball began to be played in halls, and asphalted playing-fields started to be abandoned. Visoko didn't have a hall so it was forced to play in other towns like Sarajevo, Vogošća, Zavidovići and Hadžići. After only three seasons Bosna was relegated again to the second league in 1975/76 season. From then until 1991, the club couldn't get back into first league. The most significant result was winning the cup of SR BiH in 1981. Finally, Visoko got its first handball hall, sports centre Mladost, which was finished on 9 April 1986.

=== War and recovery ===
After the devastating Bosnian War, the hall and clubs offices were damaged, but Bosna started to recover. From 1995 Bosna twice won the First league of Bosnia and Herzegovina (seasons 1996/97 and 1998/99) and record three times Cup of BiH (1995, 1998 and in 2001). Bosna had involvement in EHF competitions such as EHF Cup and EHF Cup Winner's Cup. At the end of 2001. Bosna was far most successful handball team in after war Bosnia and Herzegovina. But that year brought financial breakdown, Bosna lost most of its players and club staff, which resulted in total result crisis which lasted to 2005. From 2001 till today Bosna has not achieved significant honors, only managing to stay in the First league through good home form.

Only after 2005 club got its financial aid with signing more sponsors. Results were visible after just one season, in 2006 Bosna finished eight out of twelve clubs in the league, which was relief because club was in past season always on edge being relegated. In 2007 club finished second in Premier League and will play in EHF Cup. This is big success for club, because it is first time since 2002 that Bosna qualified form one European competition. Edhem Sirčo was first scorer for Bosna, being followed by Amir Čakić and Faruk Halilbegović.

=== Recent history ===
Handball match between home team Bosna and Lokomotiva from Brčko, played in Mladost hall in Visoko

For the 2007-2008 season Bosna was reinforced by three new players. Muhamed Mustafić, a right wing, returned to his parent club after playing 3 successful seasons in HC Bosna Sarajevo which competed successfully in the EHF Champions League, and later the EHF Cup Winner's Cup where they played semi-finals. Kenan Ahić, on loan to the Sarajevo side last season returned to Visoko. The third player is Aldin Begagić, a pivot men from Krivaja and later Goražde.

In the first round of EHF Cup Bosna played against handball club Sutjeska from Nikšić, and passed after playing draw match in Nikšić, and scored win in Visoko. Result in Nikšić was 21-21, but in Visoko home team Bosna defeated Montenegrin side by 38-27. In second round Bosna was defeated by Gold Club from Slovenia. The first game in Slovenia was a draw (37-37), but the Slovenians managed to defeat the Bosnian side at home, and went through.

== Accomplishments ==
=== Domestic ===
Yugoslavia

- SRBiH Cup:
  - Winners (4): 1965, 1968, 1971, 1982
- Yugoslav Handball Cup
  - Runner-up (1): 1965
- Yugoslav Handball Championship
  - 1975 - 4th place

Bosnia and Herzegovina – 5

- Bosnian Cup:
  - Winners (3): 1995, 1998, 2001
  - Runner-up (1): 2018
- Bosnian Championship:
  - Winners (2): 1997, 1999
  - Runner-up (1): 2007

=== European ===
- EHF Cup
  - 1/8 finalist: 1999/2000

== Recent seasons ==
The recent season-by-season performance of the club:

Season	Division	Tier	Position
2020–21	Premier League	I	13th

== Notable players ==
- (Bosnia and Herzegovina) Faruk Vražalić
- (Bosnia and Herzegovina) Muhamed Mustafić
- (Bosnia and Herzegovina) Faruk Halilbegović
- (Bosnia and Herzegovina) Adnan Harmandić

== Coaching history ==
- (Socialist Federal Republic of Yugoslavia) Srđan Praljak
- (Socialist Federal Republic of Yugoslavia) Nevzad Sirćo
- (Bosnia and Herzegovina) Halid Demirović
- (Bosnia and Herzegovina) Zdenko Antović
- (Bosnia and Herzegovina) Senad Skopljak
