= RK Bosna Sarajevo =

Bosnian handball team

Coordinates: 43°51′26.5″N 18°24′44″E

USD ORK Bosna Sarajevo
- Full name: Univerzitetsko sportsko društvo Omladinski Rukometni klub Bosna Sarajevo
- Short name: Bosna
- Founded: 1948; 78 years ago
- Arena: Olimpijska dvorana "Ramiz Salčin" Mojmilo
- Capacity: 1,500
- President: ?
- Head coach: Zuhdija Korkarić
- League: Handball Championship of Bosnia and Herzegovina
- 2024-2025: 11.
- Club colours

ORK Bosna Sarajevo is a handball club based in Centar, Sarajevo, Sarajevo Canton, the capital of Bosnia and Herzegovina. It is part of the USD Bosna organization with headquarter located at Hamze Hume 2, Sarajevo 71000, Bosnia and Herzegovina.

Home games are played in the Mala dvorana Mirza Delibašić KSC Skenderija, Olimpijska dvorana Ramiz Salčin Mojmilo in Novi Grad and the Velika dvorana Mirza Delibašić KSC Skenderija is used for important matches. The club competes in the Handball Championship of Bosnia and Herzegovina and won seven championships between 2002 and 2011. This success allowed the club to play in the top European handball tournaments, competing in the EHF Champions League three years in a row.

Their most impressive result in the EHF Champions League was achieved in the 2006–2007 season, during which they competed in the EHF Cup Winner's Cup. The team reached the semi-finals but were eliminated by HSV Handball.

== Accomplishments ==
- Handball Championship of Bosnia and Herzegovina: 7
  - Winner: 2002-2003, 2005-2006, 2006-2007, 2007-2008, 2008-2009, 2009-2010, 2010-2011
  - Runner-Up: 2003-2004, 2004-2005
- First League of Federation of Bosnia and Herzegovina - South: 1
  - Winner: 2020–21
- Handball Cup of Bosnia and Herzegovina: 5
  - Winner: 2002-2003, 2003-2004, 2007-2008, 2008-2009, 2009-2010
  - Runner-Up: 2006-2007
- Yugoslav Handball Cup: 1
  - Winner: 1962-1963
  - Runner-Up: 1954-1955, 1955-1956, 1956-1957, 1957-1958, 1965-1966
- EHF Cup Winners' Cup
  - 1/2 finals: 2006-2007
- EHF Champions League
  - 1/8 finals: 2010–11

== Recent seasons ==
The recent season-by-season performance of the club:

| Season | Division | Tier | Position |
|---|---|---|---|
| 2020–21 | Prva liga FBiH - Jug | II | 1st ↑ |

Key

| ↑ Promoted | ↓ Relegated |

== 2024-25 Team ==
| Nr. | Name |
|---|---|
| 2 | Samir Korjenić |
| 4 | Amar Malagić |
| 7 | Mihajlo Domazet |
| 8 | Kenan Selimović |
| 11 | Muhamed Zulfić |
| 12 | Samir Lilić |
| 16 | Arman Beširović |
| 20 | Demir Šabanović |
| 21 | Srđan Lale |
| 22 | Amar Korkarić |
| 24 | Adis Halilović |
| 34 | Njegoš Đukić |
| 44 | Simon Mrda |
| 80 | Amir Muhović |
| 86 | Duško Čelica |
| 99 | Benjamin Čičkušić |

== Coaching history ==
- (Bosnia and Herzegovina) Željko Martinčević
- (Bosnia and Herzegovina) Sead Hadžiahmetović
- (Bosnia and Herzegovina) Meho Bašić
- (Bosnia and Herzegovina) Milan Maksimović (until 4 July 2002)
- (Bosnia and Herzegovina) Abaz Arslanagić (4 July 2002 – 2003)
- (Bosnia and Herzegovina) Kasim Kamenica (2004–2005)
- (Bosnia and Herzegovina) Zoran Dokić (2005–2006)
- (Bosnia and Herzegovina) Halid Demirović (2006 – 25 July 2007)
- (Bosnia and Herzegovina) Dragan Marković (25 July 2007 – 4 August 2007)
- (Serbia) Jovica Elezović (7 August 2007 – 13 November 2007)
- (Bosnia and Herzegovina) Mirko Sušić (13 November 2007 – 27 December 2007)
- (Slovenia) Gregor Cvijič (27 December 2007 – 18 November 2008)
- (Bosnia and Herzegovina) Vojislav Rađa (18 November 2008 –13 July 2009)
- (Croatia) Irfan Smajlagić (13 July 2009 – 27 December 2011)
- (Bosnia and Herzegovina) Zdenko Antović (6 January 2012 – 21 December 2012)
- (Bosnia and Herzegovina) Goran Tomić (21 December 2012 – 26 July 2012)
- (Bosnia and Herzegovina) Zuhdija Korkarić (26 July 2012 – 16 March 2015)
- (Bosnia and Herzegovina) Goran Tomić (16 March 2015 – 19 September 2015)
- (Bosnia and Herzegovina) Zuhdija Korkarić (19 September 2015 – 15 July 2016)
- (Bosnia and Herzegovina) Adem Bašić (18 July 2016 – 24 November 2016)
- (Bosnia and Herzegovina) Danijel Riđić (25 November 2016 – 28 February 2017)
- (Bosnia and Herzegovina) Zuhdija Korkarić (28 February 2017 – 22 October 2017)
- (Bosnia and Herzegovina) Ejub Kukavica (22 October 2017 – 31 December 2017)
- (Bosnia and Herzegovina) Sanjin Kolaković (2 February 2018 – 24 August 2018)
- (Bosnia and Herzegovina) Zuhdija Korkarić (24 August 2018 – present)

== Chairman's history ==
| Name | Years |
|---|---|
| Dragan Nožica | |
| Nermin Salman | (2002–2009) |
| Jasmin Hošo | (2009 – 21 December 2009) |
| Muhamed Pilav | (27 December 2010 – 10 February 2015) |
| Ranko Čović | (10 February 2015 – 9 September 2015) |

| Name | Years |
|---|---|
| Samer Rešidat | (26 November 2015 – 19 October 2016) |
| Mirza Alispahić | (27 October 2016 – 16 August 2017) |
| Adnan Duran | (16 August 2017 – 28 June 2018) |
| Kenan Magoda | (28 June 2018 – present) |

== Sporting directors ==
- Gordan Muzurović
- Ammar Švrakić (26 November 2015 – 19 September 2016)
- Fuad Malagić (28 June 2018 – present)

== Directors ==
- Mirza Muzurović (2002–2007)
- Kenan Magoda (2 December 2009 – 3 July 2012)
- Šerif Krajišnik (3 October 2013 – 31 October 2015)
- Adnan Branković (13 July 2017 – 28 June 2018)
- Fuad Malagić (28 June 2018 – 16 September 2018)
- L. Dizdarević (16 September 2018 – present)
