= RK Sloga Doboj =

- Full name: Rukometni Klub Sloga Doboj
- Founded: 1958
- Arena: Dvorana srednjoškolskog centra Doboj
- Capacity: 700
- Head coach: Miljan Stanić
- League: Premijer Liga
- 2020–21: 3rd
- Club colours
Home	Away

Rukometni Klub Sloga commonly referred to as RK Sloga or simply Sloga is a team handball club from Doboj, Bosnia and Herzegovina. The team currently competes in the Handball Championship of Bosnia and Herzegovina.

== History ==
Sloga was founded in 1959. Until 1972 the club bore the name Partizan, Željezničar and Dobojindex, when it was finally changed to Sloga. RK Sloga was regular participant of Yugoslav top league between 1980 and 1991. In 1983 Sloga reached Yugoslav cup finals where it was defeated by then handball powerhouse Metaloplastika Šabac. In next season Sloga reached EHF Cup Winners' Cup final where it was defeated by FC Barcelona. The club competed in the regional SEHA League in 2013.

== Honours ==
=== Domestic ===
- Handball Championship of Bosnia and Herzegovina:
  - Winners (1): 2012
- Handball Cup of Bosnia and Herzegovina:
  - Winners (2): 2005, 2006
- Handball Cup of Yugoslavia:
  - Runner-up (1): 1983

=== European ===
- EHF Cup Winner's Cup:
  - Runner-up (1): 1984

== Team 2017–18 ==
=== Current squad ===
Goalkeeper

- (Bosnia and Herzegovina) Đorđe Bosić
- (Serbia) Milutin Bogdanović
- (Bosnia and Herzegovina) Damir Efendić
- (Bosnia and Herzegovina) Božidar Bajović

Wingers

- (Bosnia and Herzegovina) Tarik Alibegović
- (Bosnia and Herzegovina) Luka Lazić
- (Serbia) Milan Pavlov
- (Bosnia and Herzegovina) Nikola Sauka
- (Bosnia and Herzegovina) Bojan Tulendić
- (Bosnia and Herzegovina) Rajko Maričić
- (Bosnia and Herzegovina) Bojan Petrušić

Line players

- (Bosnia and Herzegovina) Branko Mišanović
- (Bosnia and Herzegovina) Radovan Uljarević

Back players

- (Bosnia and Herzegovina) Srđan Gavrić
- (Bosnia and Herzegovina) Nemanja Zekić
- (Serbia) Miljan Ivanović
- (Bosnia and Herzegovina) Danijel Pejić
- (Bosnia and Herzegovina) Aleksandar Milojević
- (Serbia) Borko Vještica
- (Bosnia and Herzegovina) Dušan Miličević
- (Bosnia and Herzegovina) Miloš Maksimović
- (Serbia) Luka Karanović

== Recent seasons ==
The recent season-by-season performance of the club:

Season	Division	Tier	Position
2020–21	Premier League	I	3rd

== Notable players ==
- (Socialist Federal Republic of Yugoslavia) Đorđe Lavrnić
- (Socialist Federal Republic of Yugoslavia) Mario Kelentrić
- (Socialist Federal Republic of Yugoslavia) Drago Jovović
- (Socialist Federal Republic of Yugoslavia) Željko Đurđić
- (Socialist Federal Republic of Yugoslavia) Muhamed Memić
- (Serbia) Šandor Hodik
- (Bosnia and Herzegovina) Danijel Šarić
- (Bosnia and Herzegovina) Faruk Vražalić
- (Bosnia and Herzegovina) Peđa Dejanović
- (Bosnia and Herzegovina) Faruk Halilbegović
- (Serbia) Vladimir Grbić

== Coaching history ==
- (Bosnia and Herzegovina) Aleksandar Dugić
- (Socialist Federal Republic of Yugoslavia) Vojislav Malešević
- (Socialist Federal Republic of Yugoslavia) Slobodan Mišković
- (Socialist Federal Republic of Yugoslavia) Đorđe Lavrnić
- (Socialist Federal Republic of Yugoslavia) Josip Glavaš
- (Socialist Federal Republic of Yugoslavia) Dušan Pavlović
- (Bosnia and Herzegovina) Vojislav Rađa
- (Bosnia and Herzegovina) Milanko Savčić
- (Bosnia and Herzegovina) Branislav Živanić
- (Bosnia and Herzegovina) Aleksandar Dugić
- (Bosnia and Herzegovina) Zoran Dokić
- (Bosnia and Herzegovina) Goran Stojić
- (Bosnia and Herzegovina) Jasmin Unkić
- (Bosnia and Herzegovina) Igor Pijetlović
- (Bosnia and Herzegovina) Milorad Gračanin
- (Croatia) Mario Kelentrić (2020–2021)
