= Tea Marinović =

Montenegrin handball player (born 1999)

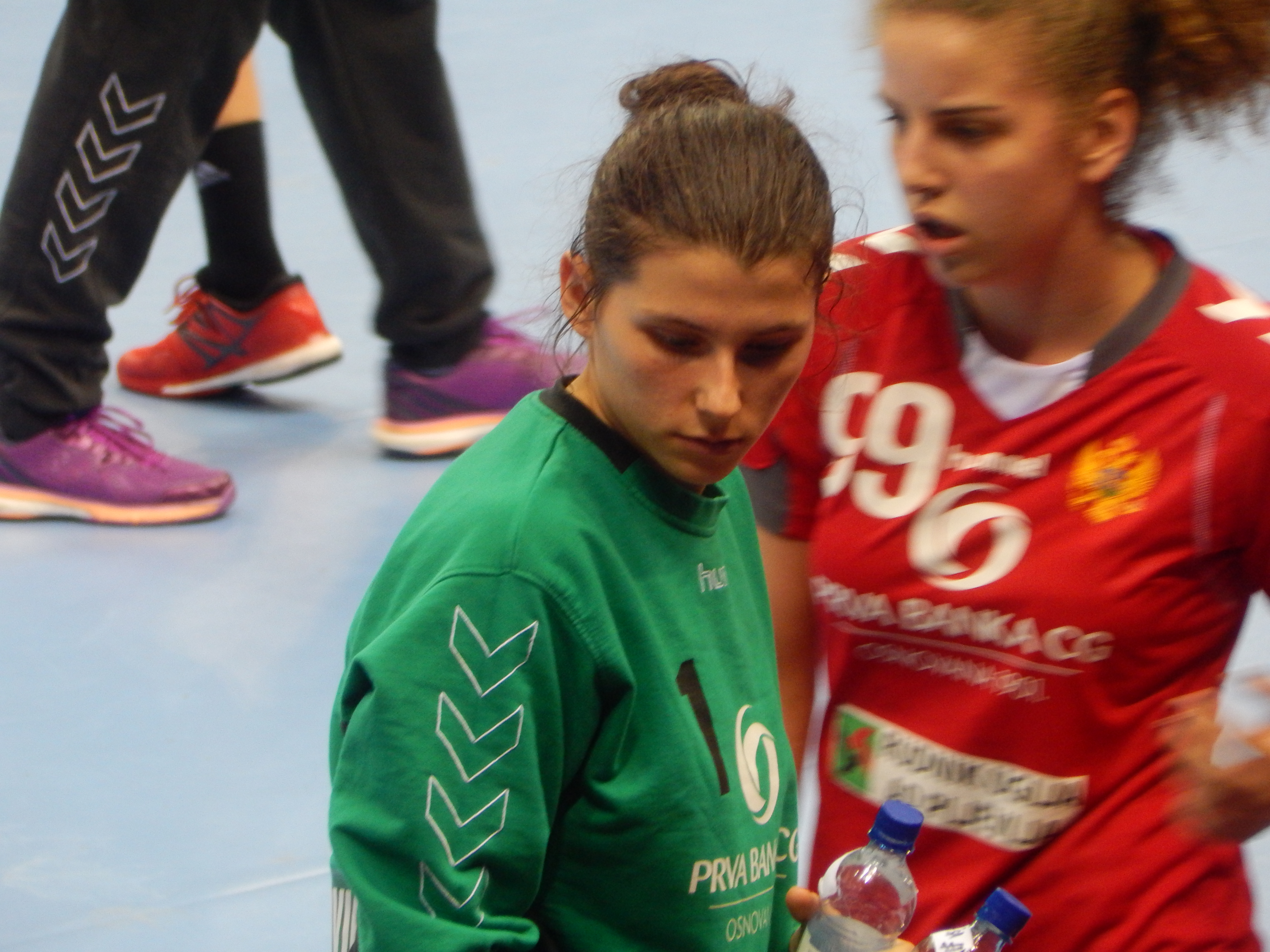
- Marinović in 2016 (green shirt)

Personal information
- Full name: Tea Marinović
- Nationality: Montenegrin
- Born: 22 October 1999 (age 26) Podgorica, Montenegro
- Height: 1.80 m (5 ft 11 in)

Sport
- Sport: Handball
- Position: Goalkeeper
- Current club: ASUL Vaulx-en-Velin Handball
- Number: 1

Senior clubs
- Years: Team
- 2015-2017: ŽRK Danilovgrad
- 2017-2018: ŽRK Budućnost
- 2018-2020: Angoulême Charente Handball
- 2020-: Chambray Touraine Handball
National team
Years	Team	Apps	(Gls)
2019-	Montenegro	3	(0)
Medal record
Mediterranean Games
Silver medal – second place	2018 Tarragona	Team

Tea Marinović (born 22 October 1999) is a Montenegrin handball player for Chambray Touraine Handball and the Montenegrin national team.

She was selected as part of the Montenegrin 35-player squad for the 2020 European Women's Handball Championship.

== Achievements ==
- Montenegrin Championship:
  - Winner: 2018
- Montenegrin Cup:
  - Winner: 2018
