= Tatjana Brnović =

Montenegrin handball player (born 1998)

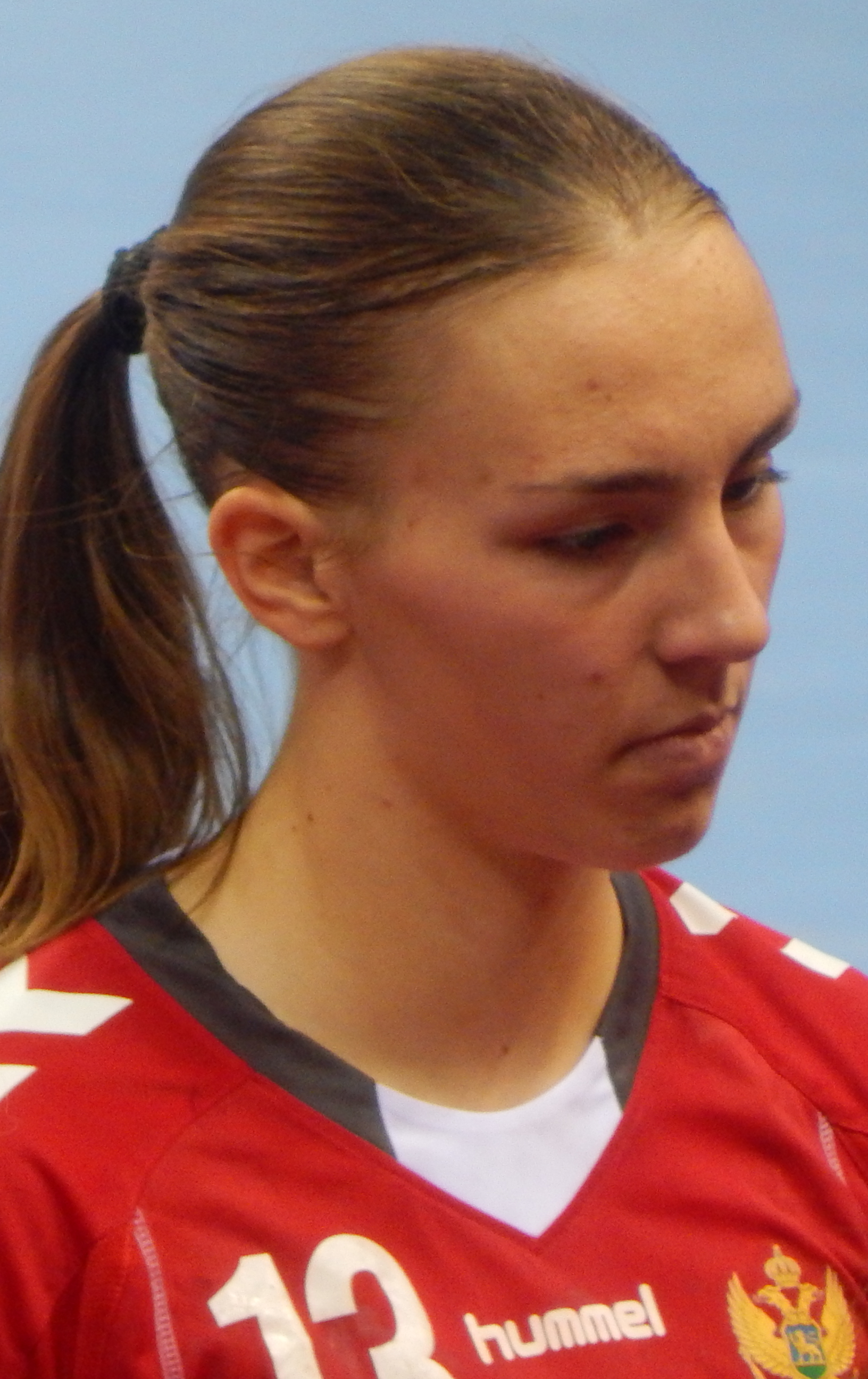

Personal information
- Nationality: Montenegrin
- Born: 9 November 1998 (age 27) Cetinje, Montenegro, FR Yugoslavia
- Height: 1.83 m (6 ft 0 in)

Sport
- Sport: Handball
- Position: Pivot
- Current club: CSM București
- Number: 34

Senior clubs
- Years: Team
- 2014–2017: ŽRK Danilovgrad
- 2017–2022: ŽRK Budućnost Podgorica
- 2022: Rostov-Don
- 2022: Krim Mercator
- 2022-2023: Brest Bretagne Handball
- 2023-2025: Krim Mercator
- 2025-2027: CSM Bucuresti
- 2027-: ŽRK Budućnost Podgorica
National team
Years	Team	Apps	(Gls)
2017–	Montenegro	98	(279)
Medal record
European Championship
Bronze medal – third place	2022 Slovenia/North Macedonia/Montenegro

Tatjana Brnović (born 9 November 1998) is a Montenegrin handball player who plays for CSM București and the Montenegrin national team.

She was selected to represent Montenegro at the 2017 World Women's Handball Championship.

== Achievements ==
=== Club ===
- Montenegrin league:
  - Winner: 2018, 2019, 2021 (with ŽRK Budućnost Podgorica)
- Montenegrin Cup
  - Winner: 2018, 2019, 2020, 2021 (with ŽRK Budućnost Podgorica)
- Slovenian league:
  - Winner: 2022, 2024 (with RK Krim)
- Slovenian Cup
  - Winner: 2022 (with RK Krim)

=== International ===
- Olympic Games
  - 2020: 6th
- World Championship:
  - 2017: 6th
  - 2019: 5th
  - 2023: 7th
- European Championship
  - 2018: 9th
  - 2022: Bronze

== Individual awards ==
- All-Star Pivot of the European Championship: 2024
