= Montenegrin handball clubs in European competitions =

Montenegrin men's handball clubs are participating in the EHF competitions since the season 1995/96.

First team which ever competed at the European cups was Mornar Bar and most successful Montenegrin represent in the European competitions is Lovćen Cetinje. The other Montenegrin clubs which competed at the EHF competitions are Berane, Rudar Pljevlja, Budućnost Podgorica, Sutjeska Nikšić, Mojkovac, Partizan Tivat and Budvanska rivijera Budva.

The greatest result in the European cups made RK Lovćen during the season 2000/01. As a champion of FR Yugoslavia, Lovćen won fifth place in the EHF Champions League.

== Results by season ==
Season	Competition	Round	Club	Opponent	Score
1995/96	EHF Cities Cup	1/32	(Montenegro) Mornar Bar	(Bulgaria) Belassitza Petritch	26:15, 16:17
1995/96	EHF Cities Cup	1/16	(Montenegro) Mornar Bar	(Ukraine) Svitlotekhnik Brovary	29:20, 14:20
1995/96	EHF Cities Cup	1/8	(Montenegro) Mornar Bar	(Croatia) Sisak	28:27, 20:28
1996/97	EHF Cup Winners' Cup	1/16	(Montenegro) Mornar Bar	(North Macedonia) Mladost Bogdanci	41:28, 16:29
1997/98	EHF Cup	1/16	(Montenegro) Lovćen Cetinje	(Romania) Minaur Baia Mare	25:20, 17:25
1998/99	EHF Cities Cup	1/16	(Montenegro) Lovćen Cetinje	(Bosnia and Herzegovina) HRK Izviđač Ljubuški	41:20, 38:30
1998/99	EHF Cities Cup	1/8	(Montenegro) Lovćen Cetinje	(Denmark) Virum-Sorgenfri HK	29:20, 20:26
1998/99	EHF Cities Cup	1/4	(Montenegro) Lovćen Cetinje	(Norway) Drammen HK	29:23, 24:32
1999/00	EHF Cup	1/16	(Montenegro) Lovćen Cetinje	(Czech Republic) SKP Frýdek-Místek	34:23, 23:29
1999/00	EHF Cup	1/8	(Montenegro) Lovćen Cetinje	(Turkey) Diyarbakir PolisGücü	32:24
1999/00	EHF Cup	1/4	(Montenegro) Lovćen Cetinje	(Portugal) ABC Braga	25:24, 21:26
2000/01	EHF Champions League	Qual	(Montenegro) Lovćen Cetinje	(Austria) Remus Bärnbach-Köflach	30:23, 30:16
2000/01	EHF Champions League	Group	(Montenegro) Lovćen Cetinje	(Norway) IL Runar	25:22, 28:23
2000/01	EHF Champions League	Group	(Montenegro) Lovćen Cetinje	(Spain) Portland San Antonio	25:24, 22:25
2000/01	EHF Champions League	Group	(Montenegro) Lovćen Cetinje	(Czech Republic) Baník Karviná	31:27, 29:29
2000/01	EHF Champions League	1/4	(Montenegro) Lovćen Cetinje	(Germany) THW Kiel	29:24, 22:35
2001/02	EHF Champions League	Group	(Montenegro) Lovćen Cetinje	(Denmark) Kolding IF	23:28, 18:20
2001/02	EHF Champions League	Group	(Montenegro) Lovćen Cetinje	(Portugal) Sporting Lisbon CP	26:22, 0:10
2001/02	EHF Champions League	Group	(Montenegro) Lovćen Cetinje	(Spain) Portland San Antonio	24:28, 19:39
2002/03	EHF Cup Winners' Cup	1/16	(Montenegro) Lovćen Cetinje	(Belarus) HPC Arkatron Minsk	31:25, 24:18
2002/03	EHF Cup Winners' Cup	1/8	(Montenegro) Lovćen Cetinje	(Russia) Energiya Voronezh	30:29, 20:29
2003/04	EHF Cup Winners' Cup	1/16	(Montenegro) Lovćen Cetinje	(Bosnia and Herzegovina) RK Sloga Doboj	29:27, 33:34
2003/04	EHF Cup Winners' Cup	1/8	(Montenegro) Lovćen Cetinje	(Turkey) Cankaya Bel. Ankara	18:21, 20:20
2005/06	EHF Cup Winners' Cup	1/16	(Montenegro) Lovćen Cetinje	(Bosnia and Herzegovina) RK Sloga Doboj	27:24, 22:27
2006/07	EHF Challenge Cup	1/16	(Montenegro) Lovćen Cetinje	(Montenegro) RK Berane	26:19, 20:23
2006/07	EHF Challenge Cup	1/8	(Montenegro) Lovćen Cetinje	(Bosnia and Herzegovina) RK Borac Banja Luka	27:17, 23:30
2006/07	EHF Challenge Cup	1/4	(Montenegro) Lovćen Cetinje	(Norway) Drammen HK	29:26, 27:37
2006/07	EHF Challenge Cup	Qual	(Montenegro) Berane	(Moldova) INFIS-Ols Chisinau	36:21
2006/07	EHF Challenge Cup	Qual	(Montenegro) Berane	(England) London GD	37:23
2006/07	EHF Challenge Cup	Qual	(Montenegro) Berane	(Greece) GAC Kilkis	29:28
2006/07	EHF Challenge Cup	1/16	(Montenegro) Berane	(Montenegro) Lovćen Cetinje	23:20, 19:26
2007/08	EHF Cup	1/16	(Montenegro) Lovćen Cetinje	(Luxembourg) HB Dudelange	30:30, 34:35
2007/08	EHF Cup	1/16	(Montenegro) Sutjeska Nikšić	(Bosnia and Herzegovina) Bosna Visoko	21:21, 27:38
2007/08	EHF Cup Winners' Cup	1/32	(Montenegro) Berane	(Luxembourg) Berchem	28:27, 28:23
2007/08	EHF Cup Winners' Cup	1/16	(Montenegro) Berane	(Denmark) KIF Kolding	23:37, 28:47
2007/08	EHF Challenge Cup	1/32	(Montenegro) Mojkovac	(Portugal) SL Benfica Lisbon	22:46, 26:44
2007/08	EHF Challenge Cup	1/32	(Montenegro) Mornar Bar	(Belarus) HPC Arkatron Minsk	28:27, 18:26
2008/09	EHF Cup	1/32	(Montenegro) Lovćen Cetinje	(Faroe Islands) Neistin Tórshavn	35:21, 32:33
2008/09	EHF Cup	1/16	(Montenegro) Lovćen Cetinje	(Portugal) SL Benfica Lisbon	28:26, 23:24
2008/09	EHF Cup	1/8	(Montenegro) Lovćen Cetinje	(Slovenia) RK Gorenje Velenje	28:33, 16:35
2008/09	EHF Cup	1/32	(Montenegro) Berane	(Portugal) Os Belenenses	36:32, 22:31
2008/09	EHF Cup Winners' Cup	1/32	(Montenegro) Sutjeska Nikšić	(Belgium) United Tongeren	22:20, 22:23
2008/09	EHF Cup Winners' Cup	1/16	(Montenegro) Sutjeska Nikšić	(Ukraine) Budivelnyk Brovary	20:21, 17:30
2008/09	EHF Challenge Cup	Qual	(Montenegro) Budućnost Podgorica	(England) Manchester	39:11
2008/09	EHF Challenge Cup	Qual	(Montenegro) Budućnost Podgorica	(Sweden) LIF Lindesberg	34:30
2008/09	EHF Challenge Cup	Qual	(Montenegro) Budućnost Podgorica	(Croatia) Karlovac	28:28
2008/09	EHF Challenge Cup	1/16	(Montenegro) Budućnost Podgorica	(Bosnia and Herzegovina) Sloga Doboj	37:19, 32:22
2008/09	EHF Challenge Cup	1/16	(Montenegro) Budućnost Podgorica	(Portugal) Maritimo da Madeira	30:26, 31:28
2008/09	EHF Challenge Cup	1/8	(Montenegro) Budućnost Podgorica	(Turkey) Beşiktaş Istanbul	27:25, 23:26
2008/09	EHF Challenge Cup	1/16	(Montenegro) Mornar Bar	(Portugal) Maritimo da Madeira	27:29, 19:37
2009/10	EHF Champions League	Qual	(Montenegro) Budućnost Podgorica	(Belarus) Dinamo Minsk	27:35
2009/10	EHF Champions League	Qual	(Montenegro) Budućnost Podgorica	(North Macedonia) Vardar Skopje	28:35
2009/10	EHF Champions League	Qual	(Montenegro) Budućnost Podgorica	(Turkey) Beşiktaş Istanbul	31:28
2009/10	EHF Cup	1/32	(Montenegro) Budućnost Podgorica	(Bosnia and Herzegovina) Borac Banja Luka	36:30, 29:33
2009/10	EHF Cup	1/16	(Montenegro) Budućnost Podgorica	(Germany) TBV Lemgo	28:28, 23:46
2009/10	EHF Cup	1/32	(Montenegro) Sutjeska Nikšić	(Luxembourg) Handball Esch	23:23, 26:32
2009/10	EHF Cup Winners' Cup	1/16	(Montenegro) Lovćen Cetinje	Tremblay-en-France Handball	27:24, 20:33
2009/10	EHF Challenge Cup	Qual	(Montenegro) Berane	(North Macedonia) Tineks Prolet	29:22
2009/10	EHF Challenge Cup	Qual	(Montenegro) Berane	(England) Olympia London	44:30
2009/10	EHF Challenge Cup	Qual	(Montenegro) Berane	(Portugal) Xico Andebol	22:26
2009/10	EHF Challenge Cup	1/32	(Montenegro) Berane	(Greece) AO Dimou	30:27, 25:33
2009/10	EHF Challenge Cup	1/32	(Montenegro) Budvanska Rivijera Budva	(Norway) Stord Handball	20:24, 22:29
2010/11	EHF Cup	1/16	(Montenegro) Lovćen Cetinje	(Portugal) Xico Andebol	25:26, 32:33
2010/11	EHF Challenge Cup	1/32	(Montenegro) Rudar Pljevlja	(Montenegro) Budvanska rivijera Budva	26:19, 34:24
2010/11	EHF Challenge Cup	1/16	(Montenegro) Rudar Pljevlja	(Romania) Știința Bacău	22:31, 15:40
2010/11	EHF Challenge Cup	1/32	(Montenegro) Budvanska rivijera Budva	(Montenegro) Rudar Pljevlja	24:34, 19:26
2011/12	EHF Cup Winners' Cup	1/16	(Montenegro) Lovćen Cetinje	(Portugal) SL Benfica Lisbon	21:25, 14:26
2011/12	EHF Cup	1/32	(Montenegro) Sutjeska Nikšić	(Kosovo) Kastrioti	30:27, 35:25
2011/12	EHF Cup	1/16	(Montenegro) Sutjeska Nikšić	(Croatia) Nexe Našice	21:29, 25:30
2011/12	EHF Cup	1/32	(Montenegro) Mojkovac	(Serbia) Crvena zvezda Beograd	24:23, 21:23
2012/13	EHF Champions League	Qual	(Montenegro) Lovćen Cetinje	(Bosnia and Herzegovina) RK Sloga Doboj	23:25
2012/13	EHF Champions League	Qual	(Montenegro) Lovćen Cetinje	(Portugal) FC Porto	25:31
2012/13	EHF Cup	1/32	(Montenegro) Lovćen Cetinje	(Denmark) Kolding IF	31:32, 17:34
2012/13	EHF Cup	1/32	(Montenegro) Mojkovac	(Iceland) Haukar Hafnarfjördur	19:25, 12:32
2012/13	EHF Challenge Cup	1/32	(Montenegro) Sutjeska Nikšić	(Belgium) Initia Hasselt	18:30, 16:23
2013/14	EHF Cup	1/32	(Montenegro) Lovćen Cetinje	(Israel) Maccabi Tel Aviv	35:37, 29:30
2014/15	EHF Cup	1/32	(Montenegro) Lovćen Cetinje	(Switzerland) HC Kriens - Luzern	22:30, 25:37
2014/15	EHF Challenge Cup	1/32	(Montenegro) Partizan Tivat	(Luxembourg) HB Dudelange	28:38, 26:37
2015/16	EHF Cup	1/32	(Montenegro) Lovćen Cetinje	(Netherlands) KRAS/Volendam	23:34, 18:30
2016/17	EHF Cup	1/32	(Montenegro) Budvanska rivijera Budva	(Greece) Filippos Verias	26:28, 24:30
2016/17	EHF Challenge Cup	1/32	(Montenegro) Partizan Tivat	(Cyprus) SPE Strovolos	27:21, 22:22
2016/17	EHF Challenge Cup	1/16	(Montenegro) Partizan Tivat	(Iceland) Valur	24:24, 21:21
2017/18	EHF Cup	1/32	(Montenegro) Partizan Tivat	(Belgium) HC Achilles Bocholt	19:38, 20:32
2017/18	EHF Challenge Cup	Qual	(Montenegro) Mojkovac	(Turkey) Amasya	10:0, 10:0
2017/18	EHF Challenge Cup	1/16	(Montenegro) Mojkovac	(Ukraine) ZNTU-ZAB Zaporizhzhia	26:35, 20:36
2017/18	EHF Challenge Cup	1/16	(Montenegro) Lovćen Cetinje	(Slovakia) MŠK Považská Bystrica	24:24, 26:34
2018/19	EHF Challenge Cup	Qual	(Montenegro) Jedinstvo Bijelo Polje	(Lithuania) Kauno Azuolas	22:37, 24:36
2019/20	EHF Cup	Qual	(Montenegro) Lovćen Cetinje	(Serbia) Vojvodina Novi Sad	29:41, 23:38

== Scores by teams ==
Club	S	G	W	D	L	GD	Pts
Lovćen Cetinje	20	73	27	4	42	1860:1984	56
Berane	4	16	10	0	6	459:453	20
Budućnost Podgorica	2	16	9	2	5	483:450	20
Sutjeska Nikšić	5	14	3	2	9	323:372	11
Mornar Bar	4	10	4	0	6	282:280	8
Mojkovac	4	10	3	0	7	200:274	6
Partizan Tivat	3	8	1	3	4	187:231	5
Rudar Pljevlja	1	4	2	0	2	97:114	4
Budvanska rivijera Budva	3	6	0	0	6	135:171	0
Jedinstvo Bijelo Polje	1	2	0	0	2	46:73	0
10 TEAMS		159	59	11	89	4072:4402	129

S - seasons; G - games; W - wins; D - draws; L - losses; GD - goal difference; Pts - points (win = 2pts; draw = 1)

== Opponents by countries ==
In the European competitions, Montenegrin clubs played against clubs from various 30 countries.

Country	G	W	D	L
Austria	2	2	0	0
Belgium	6	1	0	5
Belarus	5	3	0	2
Bosnia and Herzegovina	15	7	1	7
Bulgaria	2	1	0	1
Croatia	5	1	1	3
Cyprus	2	1	1	0
Czech Republic	4	2	1	1
Denmark	8	1	0	7
England	3	3	0	0
Faroe Islands	2	1	0	1
France	2	1	0	1
Germany	4	1	1	2
Greece	5	2	0	3
Iceland	4	0	2	2
Israel	2	0	0	2
Kosovo	2	2	0	0
Lithuania	2	0	0	2
Luxembourg	8	2	2	4
Moldova	1	1	0	0
Netherlands	2	0	0	2
North Macedonia	4	2	0	2
Norway	8	4	0	4
Portugal	18	5	0	13
Romania	4	1	0	3
Russia	2	1	0	1
Serbia	4	1	0	3
Slovakia	2	0	1	1
Slovenia	2	0	0	2
Spain	4	1	0	3
Sweden	1	1	0	0
Switzerland	2	0	0	2
Turkey	8	5	1	2
Ukraine	6	1	0	5

Table not including four mutual games between Montenegrin clubs.

== See also ==
- Montenegrin First League of Men's Handball
- Montenegrin Handball League Records
- Montenegrin Second League of Men's Handball
- Montenegrin Men's Handball Cup
- Montenegrin First League of Women's Handball
- Montenegrin women's handball clubs in European competitions
