= 2022 European Women's Handball Championship bidding process =

The 2022 European Women's Handball Championship bidding process entails the bids for the 2022 European Women's Handball Championship. The winners were Slovenia, Macedonia and Montenegro.

== Bidding timeline ==
The bidding timeline was as follows:

- 1 May 2017: Bidding nations to provide official expression of interest in the hosting of the tournament
- 1 July 2017: Bidding manuals sent to all bidding federations
- 1 November 2017: Deadline for completed bidding and application documentation to be provided to the EHF office
- 15 December 2017: Applications to be approved at the EHF executive committee in Hamburg
- 20 June 2018: appointment of host(s) of EHF Euro 2022 at the 14th ordinary EHF Congress in Glasgow, Scotland

== Bids ==
On 4 May 2017 it was announced that the following nations had sent in an official expression of interest:

- (North Macedonia) Macedonia

However, when the deadline for submitting the final bids was over, the following applications had been received:

- Slovenia, (North Macedonia) Macedonia & Montenegro

=== Slovenia, Macedonia and Montenegro ===
Slovenia, Macedonia and Montenegro arena map

Macedonia tried to bid by themselves originally, but would later join up with their Balkan neighbors from Slovenia and Montenegro. President of the Macedonian federation, Zhivko Mukaetov, was quoted saying:

"I am also optimistic about the 2022 European championship organisation. The idea is to perform together and try to bring the championship to Skopje, Ljubljana and Podgorica. I think the performance together, regionally, obviously produces results and I think we have not good chances, but great chances to organize it. It will be a big plus for Macedonia, I think we will affirm the country and handball in a very positive way. Women's handball is currently has lower development than the male counterpart, so this will be an injection to get a level at least close to men's handball."

Throughout early 2018, they further promoted their bid, including going to Croatia for the 2018 European Men's Handball Championship. Their slogan is We Can Handball.

In April 2018, concerns were brought up about their bid as the venues in Celje and Podgorica were deemed to have needed a lot of renovation for the championship.

The main round would be in Skopje and Ljubljana, with the final weekend at the Arena Stožice in Ljubljana.

Proposed venues
(Slovenia) Ljubljana	(Slovenia) Celje
Arena Stožice	Zlatorog Arena
Capacity: 12,480	Capacity: 5,191
(North Macedonia) Skopje	(Montenegro) Podgorica
Boris Trajkovski Sports Center	Morača Sports Center
Capacity: 6,173	Capacity: 6,000

== Withdrawn bids ==
- Russia

Russia had originally stated an interest in bidding for the event, but decided to bid for 2024 instead. Although they would withdraw their interest from that event also.

== Host selection ==
On the 20 June 2018, Slovenia, Macedonia and Montenegro won the hosting rights.

Voting Results
Bids
Bids	Votes
Slovenia, (North Macedonia) Macedonia & Montenegro	41
Votes against the bid	1
Total	42
