= Montenegrin Second League of Women's Handball =

The Montenegrin Second League of Women's Handball is the lower Women's team handball league in Montenegro. It is organized by the Handball Federation of Montenegro. The league comprises five teams.

== Clubs for the 2007/2008 season ==
- ŽRK 067 - Podgorica
- ŽRK Berane - Berane
- ŽRK Danilovgrad - Danilovgrad
- ŽRK Devetka II - Podgorica
- ŽRK Gorica - Podgorica
- ŽRK Slobodan

== Winners ==
- 2006/2007 - ŽRK Biseri (Pljevlja)
