= Montenegrin Women's Handball Cup =

Handball competition in Montenegro

- Sport: Handball
- Founded: 2006
- No. of teams: 8
- Country: Montenegro
- Continent: Europe
- Most recent champion: ŽRK Budućnost
- Most titles: ŽRK Budućnost (17 titles in independent Montenegro; 28 overall)
- Broadcaster: RTCG
- Website: rscg.me

The Montenegrin Women's Handball Cup (Montenegrin: Crnogorski rukometni kup za žene) is a national women's team handball competition in Montenegro operated by the Handball Federation of Montenegro. It has been held annually since Montenegrin independence in 2006.

== History ==
=== Before independence ===
Before Montenegrin independence, clubs from that Republic played in handball Cup of Yugoslavia / Serbia and Montenegro. Most successful was ŽRK Budućnost Podgorica with 11 trophies won.
ŽRK Budućnost won the national Cup on seasons 1983–84, 1988–89, 1994–95, 1995–96, 1996–97, 1997–98, 1999-00, 2000–01, 2001–02, 2004–05, 2005–06.

=== After independence ===
Except Montenegrin First League of Women's Handball as a top-tier league competition, after the independence, Handball Federation of Montenegro established Montenegrin Cup as a second elite national tournament. Inaugural season of Montenegrin Cup was 2006-07, and by now all the titles are won by ŽRK Budućnost.

== Winners ==
=== Season by season ===
Below is a list of Montenegrin Cup winners since the season 2006-07.

Season	Winner	Result	Runner/up
2006–07	ŽRK Budućnost Podgorica	37-19	ŽRK Petrol Bonus Podgorica
2007–08	ŽRK Budućnost Podgorica	42-16	ŽRK Nikšić
2008–09	ŽRK Budućnost Podgorica	33-24	ŽRK Biseri Pljevlja
2009–10	ŽRK Budućnost Podgorica	35-20	ŽRK Biseri Pljevlja
2010–11	ŽRK Budućnost Podgorica	49-23	ŽRK Nikšić
2011–12	ŽRK Budućnost Podgorica	38-26	ŽRK Biseri Pljevlja
2012–13	ŽRK Budućnost Podgorica	32-18	ŽRK Budućnost Podgorica 'B'
2013–14	ŽRK Budućnost Podgorica	24-14	ŽRK Danilovgrad
2014–15	ŽRK Budućnost Podgorica	32-23	ŽRK Danilovgrad
2015–16	ŽRK Budućnost Podgorica	28-14	ŽRK Levalea Nikšić
2016–17	ŽRK Budućnost Podgorica	22-16	ŽRK Danilovgrad
2017–18	ŽRK Budućnost Podgorica	33-11	ŽRK Levalea Nikšić
2018–19	ŽRK Budućnost Podgorica	28-15	ŽRK Budućnost Podgorica 'B'
2019–20	ŽRK Budućnost Podgorica	38-14	ŽRK Levalea Nikšić
2020–21	ŽRK Budućnost Podgorica	27-19	ŽRK Levalea Nikšić
2021–22	ŽRK Budućnost Podgorica	46-18	ŽRK Levalea Nikšić
2022–23	ŽRK Budućnost Podgorica	34-17	ŽRK Rudar Pljevlja

=== Trophies by Club ===
Club	Titles / Montenegro	Years won	Titles / Yugoslavia	Years won
ŽRK Budućnost Podgorica	17	2006–07, 2007–08, 2008–09, 2009–10, 2010–11, 2011–12, 2012–13, 2013–14, 2014–15, 2015–16, 2016-17, 2017-18, 2018-19, 2019-20, 2020-21, 2021-22, 2022-23	11	1983–84, 1988–89, 1994–95, 1995–96, 1996–97, 1997–98, 1999-00, 2000–01, 2001–02, 2004–05, 2005–06

== See also ==
- Montenegrin First League of Women's Handball
- Montenegrin women's handball clubs in European competitions
- Montenegrin Men's Handball Cup
