= Karl Schelenz =

German sports teacher (1890–1956)

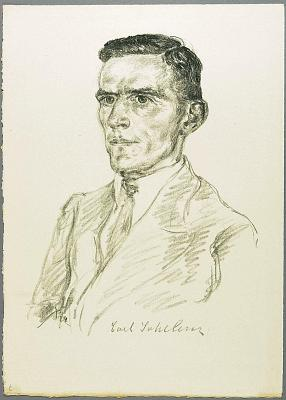
Carl Schelenz (painted by Emil Stumpp, 1924)

Karl Schelenz (or Carl Schelenz, born 6 February 1890 in Berlin; died 7 February 1956) was a German sports teacher. He is famous as the "father" of modern handball.

== Life ==
Schelenz worked as a sports teacher in Berlin and in Flensburg. As an author, he wrote books on the modern sport of handball. In 1917 he, Erich Konigh, and Max Heiser published the first modern set of rules for handball on 29 October in Berlin, which is seen as the date of birth of the sport. Schelenz modified the rules in 1919.

In 1916 and in 1917, he was the German champion in long jump. He was third in the German championship in high jump. Schelenz was a member of the German sport team Berliner Turner-Verein von 1850 e. V. in Berlin.

== Best marks ==
- High jump: 1.80 m, on 27 June 1920 in Stettin and on 4 July 1921 in Berlin
- Long jump: 7.23 m, on 24 July 1921 in Berlin
- Triple jump: 14.07 m, on 28 July 1921 in Hamburg
- Discus throw: 39.22 m, on 29 May 1921 in Cologne

== Works by Schelenz ==
- Das Handballspiel: Bearb. f. Theorie u. Praxis 1922 Deutsche Sportbehörde für Leichtathletik, Munich (as Carl Schelenz)
- Deutschlands Olympiakämpfer 1928 in Wort u. Bild 1928 W. Limpert, Dresden (as Carl Schelenz) together with Karl Scharping
- Lehrbuch des Handballspiels: Technik; Taktik 1943 Limpert, Berlin (as Karl Schelenz)
- Handball: Training und Leistung 1949 Antäus-Verlag, Lübeck (as Karl Schelenz)
