= Montenegrin women's handball clubs in European competitions =

Montenegrin women's handball clubs are participating in the EHF competitions since the season 1984/85.
At the earlier times, Montenegrin teams represented SFR Yugoslavia or FR Yugoslavia in European competitions, and from 2006 and Montenegrin independence, they qualify through Montenegrin First League of Women's Handball and Montenegrin Women's Handball Cup.

== European trophies ==
Montenegrin side ŽRK Budućnost Podgorica was extremely successful in the European Cups and today is among the best and most-trophied European and global women's handball teams. They are most successful Montenegrin sports team in European Cups, too. ŽRK Budućnost won six European titles, and among them are:

- EHF Women's Champions League:
  - Winners: 2012, 2015
- Women's EHF Cup Winners' Cup:
  - Winners: 1985, 2006, 2010
- Women's EHF Cup:
  - Winners: 1987

== Scores by clubs ==
Except ŽRK Budućnost, until today, representatives of Montenegro in women's EHF competitions were ŽRK Rudar Pljevlja, ŽRK Biseri Pljevlja, ŽRK Danilovgrad, ŽRK Nikšić and ŽRK Petrol Bonus Podgorica.
Majority of matches are played by ŽRK Budućnost Podgorica.

Team	Seasons	G	W	D	L
ŽRK Budućnost Podgorica	35	377	208	29	140
ŽRK Biseri Pljevlja	5	12	1	0	11
ŽRK Danilovgrad	4	8	1	1	6
ŽRK Petrol Bonus Podgorica	1	4	2	0	2
ŽRK Nikšić	1	4	1	0	3
ŽRK Rudar Pljevlja	1	2	0	0	2

As of the end of EHF competitions 2022–23 season.

== Results by season ==
Below is a list of games of all Montenegrin women's clubs in EHF competitions.

Season	Competition	Round	Montenegrin team	Opponent	Home	Away
1984-85	EHF Cup Winners' Cup	Round of 32	ŽRK Budućnost Podgorica	(Israel) Maccabi Ramat Gan	40-4	41-5
1984-85	EHF Cup Winners' Cup	Round of 16	ŽRK Budućnost Podgorica	(Romania) Oltchim Vâlcea	27-21	25-26
1984-85	EHF Cup Winners' Cup	Quarterfinals	ŽRK Budućnost Podgorica	(Germany) Magdeburg	27-12	19-30
1984-85	EHF Cup Winners' Cup	Semifinals	ŽRK Budućnost Podgorica	(Russia) Kuban Krasnodar	29-22	21-26
1984-85	EHF Cup Winners' Cup	FINAL	ŽRK Budućnost Podgorica	(Slovakia) Druzstevnik Topolniky	33-18	22-18
1985-86	EHF Champions League	Round of 16	ŽRK Budućnost Podgorica	(Germany) Bayer Leverkusen	23-17	14-13
1985-86	EHF Champions League	Quarterfinals	ŽRK Budućnost Podgorica	(Poland) Cracovia	27-17	26-32
1985-86	EHF Champions League	Semifinals	ŽRK Budućnost Podgorica	(Romania) Știința Bacău	30-31	23-30
1986-87	Women's EHF Cup	Round of 16	ŽRK Budućnost Podgorica	(Romania) Brașov	30-18	18-27
1986-87	Women's EHF Cup	Quarterfinals	ŽRK Budućnost Podgorica	(Germany) Leipzig	26-18	21-29
1986-87	Women's EHF Cup	Semifinals	ŽRK Budućnost Podgorica	(Azerbaijan) Avtomobilist Baku	23-19	24-28
1986-87	Women's EHF Cup	FINAL	ŽRK Budućnost Podgorica	(Slovakia) ŠKP Bratislava	34-27	21-23
1987-88	Women's EHF Cup	Round of 16	ŽRK Budućnost Podgorica	(Slovakia) Inter Bratislava	28-23	24-24
1987-88	Women's EHF Cup	Quarterfinals	ŽRK Budućnost Podgorica	(Bulgaria) VIF Georgi Dimitrov	29-19	23-30
1987-88	Women's EHF Cup	Semifinals	ŽRK Budućnost Podgorica	(Slovenia) Olimpija Ljubljana	30-23	26-29
1987-88	Women's EHF Cup	FINAL	ŽRK Budućnost Podgorica	(Lithuania) Eglė Vilnius	32-22	20-34
1988-89	Women's EHF Cup	Round of 16	ŽRK Budućnost Podgorica	(Hungary) Spartacus Budapest	34-31	28-31
1989-90	EHF Champions League	Round of 16	ŽRK Budućnost Podgorica	(France) Metz Handball	27-16	23-22
1989-90	EHF Champions League	Quarterfinals	ŽRK Budućnost Podgorica	(Russia) Kuban Krasnodar	33-30	22-31
1990-91	EHF Champions League	Round of 16	ŽRK Budućnost Podgorica	(Italy) Cassano Magnago	25-18	28-16
1990-91	EHF Champions League	Quarterfinals	ŽRK Budućnost Podgorica	(Germany) Lutzellinden	25-33	23-26
1995-96	EHF Champions League	Round of 32	ŽRK Budućnost Podgorica	(Portugal) Madeira	27-20	20-15
1995-96	EHF Champions League	Quarterfinals	ŽRK Budućnost Podgorica	(Austria) Hypo Niederösterreich	20-17	18-30
1996-97	EHF Champions League	Round 1	ŽRK Budućnost Podgorica	(Ukraine) Sparak Kyiv	24-20	19-18
1996-97	EHF Champions League	Group A	ŽRK Budućnost Podgorica	(Denmark) Viborg	23-23	21-36
1996-97	EHF Champions League	Group A	ŽRK Budućnost Podgorica	(North Macedonia) Gjorče Petrov Skopje	22-20	20-24
1996-97	EHF Champions League	Group A	ŽRK Budućnost Podgorica	(Croatia) Graničar Đurđevac	23-23	21-17
1997-98	EHF Champions League	Round 1	ŽRK Budućnost Podgorica	(Czech Republic) Ostrava	34-26	32-32
1997-98	EHF Champions League	Group C	ŽRK Budućnost Podgorica	(Norway) Larvik	27-26	29-32
1997-98	EHF Champions League	Group C	ŽRK Budućnost Podgorica	(Spain) Amadeo Tortajada	26-24	31-30
1997-98	EHF Champions League	Group C	ŽRK Budućnost Podgorica	(North Macedonia) Gjorče Petrov Skopje	32-25	27-32
1997-98	EHF Champions League	Quarterfinals	ŽRK Budućnost Podgorica	(Denmark) Viborg	39-30	27-27
1997-98	EHF Champions League	Semifinals	ŽRK Budućnost Podgorica	(Spain) Valencia	26-40	28-30
1998-99	EHF Champions League	Round 1	ŽRK Budućnost Podgorica	(Switzerland) Saint Otmar	32-22	35-24
1998-99	EHF Champions League	Group B	ŽRK Budućnost Podgorica	(Lithuania) Eglė Vilnius	28-19	35-28
1998-99	EHF Champions League	Group B	ŽRK Budućnost Podgorica	(Germany) Leipzig	33-20	22-22
1998-99	EHF Champions League	Group B	ŽRK Budućnost Podgorica	(Spain) Valencia	29-17	30-24
1998-99	EHF Champions League	Quarterfinals	ŽRK Budućnost Podgorica	(France) Besançon	30-21	32-29
1998-99	EHF Champions League	Semifinals	ŽRK Budućnost Podgorica	(Slovenia) Krim Ljubljana	29-32	29-26
1999-00	EHF Champions League	Round 1	ŽRK Budućnost Podgorica	(Georgia (country)) Martve Tbilisi	52-10	45-10
1999-00	EHF Champions League	Group C	ŽRK Budućnost Podgorica	(Russia) Dynamo Volgograd	29-20	29-34
1999-00	EHF Champions League	Group C	ŽRK Budućnost Podgorica	(Germany) Leipzig	32-29	25-29
1999-00	EHF Champions League	Group C	ŽRK Budućnost Podgorica	(Spain) Elda	31-26	26-21
1999-00	EHF Champions League	Quarterfinals	ŽRK Budućnost Podgorica	(Hungary) Dunaújvárosi	27-25	33-33
1999-00	EHF Champions League	Semifinals	ŽRK Budućnost Podgorica	(Austria) Hypo Niederösterreich	28-28	27-29
2000-01	EHF Champions League	Group A	ŽRK Budućnost Podgorica	(Denmark) Frederiksberg	35-21	24-24
2000-01	EHF Champions League	Group A	ŽRK Budućnost Podgorica	(Russia) Dynamo Volgograd	22-22	24-25
2000-01	EHF Champions League	Group A	ŽRK Budućnost Podgorica	(Austria) Hypo Niederösterreich	36-28	30-29
2000-01	EHF Champions League	Quarterfinals	ŽRK Budućnost Podgorica	(Norway) Baekkelagets	20-20	26-24
2000-01	EHF Champions League	Semifinals	ŽRK Budućnost Podgorica	(Slovenia) Krim Ljubljana	27-25	21-28
2001-02	EHF Champions League	Group C	ŽRK Budućnost Podgorica	(Spain) Valencia	33-27	31-28
2001-02	EHF Champions League	Group C	ŽRK Budućnost Podgorica	(Hungary) Dunaújvárosi	33-25	22-28
2001-02	EHF Champions League	Group C	ŽRK Budućnost Podgorica	(Norway) GOG Gudme	32-23	29-34
2001-02	EHF Champions League	Quarterfinals	ŽRK Budućnost Podgorica	(Ukraine) Motor Zaporizhzhia	28-22	26-26
2001-02	EHF Champions League	Semifinals	ŽRK Budućnost Podgorica	(Hungary) Ferencvárosi Budapest	31-32	32-32
2002-03	EHF Champions League	Round 2	ŽRK Budućnost Podgorica	(Turkey) Anadolu Uni Eskisehir	41-20	29-23
2002-03	EHF Champions League	Group A	ŽRK Budućnost Podgorica	(France) Metz Handball	34-25	30-31
2002-03	EHF Champions League	Group A	ŽRK Budućnost Podgorica	(Spain) Ferrobus Mislata	25-24	24-23
2002-03	EHF Champions League	Group A	ŽRK Budućnost Podgorica	(Slovenia) Krim Ljubljana	19-27	29-32
2002-03	EHF Champions League	Quarterfinals	ŽRK Budućnost Podgorica	(Denmark) Midtjylland	28-29	26-25
2003-04	EHF Champions League	Group B	ŽRK Budućnost Podgorica	(Denmark) Midtjylland	31-19	22-30
2003-04	EHF Champions League	Group B	ŽRK Budućnost Podgorica	(Ukraine) Motor Zaporizhzhia	27-25	28-26
2003-04	EHF Champions League	Group B	ŽRK Budućnost Podgorica	(Slovenia) Krim Ljubljana	26-24	25-35
2003-04	EHF Champions League	Quarterfinals	ŽRK Budućnost Podgorica	(Hungary) Dunaújvárosi	26-31	24-29
2004-05	EHF Champions League	Group D	ŽRK Budućnost Podgorica	(Spain) Valencia	32-28	28-33
2004-05	EHF Champions League	Group D	ŽRK Budućnost Podgorica	(Denmark) Midtjylland	22-27	25-32
2004-05	EHF Champions League	Group D	ŽRK Budućnost Podgorica	(Hungary) Dunaújvárosi	16-18	18-27
2005-06	EHF Champions League	Group C	ŽRK Budućnost Podgorica	(Spain) Valencia	23-28	22-29
2005-06	EHF Champions League	Group C	ŽRK Budućnost Podgorica	(Austria) Hypo Niederösterreich	21-20	30-36
2005-06	EHF Champions League	Group C	ŽRK Budućnost Podgorica	(Norway) Byåsen Trondheim	29-19	25-22
2005-06	EHF Cup Winners' Cup	Quarterfinals	ŽRK Budućnost Podgorica	(Germany) Bayer Leverkusen	29-23	18-21
2005-06	EHF Cup Winners' Cup	Semifinals	ŽRK Budućnost Podgorica	(Norway) Gjerpen	37-29	28-24
2005-06	EHF Cup Winners' Cup	FINAL	ŽRK Budućnost Podgorica	(Hungary) Győri ETO	25-25	26-23
2006-07	EHF Champions League	Group B	ŽRK Budućnost Podgorica	(Hungary) Győri ETO	25-31	20-28
2006-07	EHF Champions League	Group B	ŽRK Budućnost Podgorica	(Russia) Lada Togliatti	23-27	23-32
2006-07	EHF Champions League	Group B	ŽRK Budućnost Podgorica	(Norway) Byåsen Trondheim	24-29	26-27
2007-08	EHF Champions League	Group D	ŽRK Budućnost Podgorica	(Hungary) Ferencvárosi Budapest	22-19	28-36
2007-08	EHF Champions League	Group D	ŽRK Budućnost Podgorica	(Denmark) Viborg	31-31	29-36
2007-08	EHF Champions League	Group D	ŽRK Budućnost Podgorica	(Romania) Oltchim Vâlcea	21-32	22-35
2007-08	EHF Cup Winners' Cup	Round of 16	ŽRK Budućnost Podgorica	(Spain) Bera Bera	29-27	27-33
2007-08	EHF Cup Winners' Cup	Round 1	ŽRK Petrol Bonus Podgorica	(Cyprus) Youth Union Athienou	36-13	30-19
2007-08	EHF Cup Winners' Cup	Round 2	ŽRK Petrol Bonus Podgorica	(Hungary) Debreceni	12-30	12-44
2007-08	Women's EHF Cup	Round 1	ŽRK Nikšić	(Faroe Islands) Stjornan	26-20	23-28
2007-08	Women's EHF Cup	Round 2	ŽRK Nikšić	(Russia) Dynamo Volgograd	14-44	12-38
2007-08	Women's EHF Challenge Cup	Round 2	ŽRK Biseri Pljevlja	(Portugal) Juve Lis	8-28	
2007-08	Women's EHF Challenge Cup	Round 2	ŽRK Biseri Pljevlja	(Bosnia and Herzegovina) Ljubuški	16-29	
2007-08	Women's EHF Challenge Cup	Round 2	ŽRK Biseri Pljevlja	(Belarus) Victory Minsk	14-40	
2008-09	EHF Champions League	Group B	ŽRK Budućnost Podgorica	(Spain) Elda	28-26	26-20
2008-09	EHF Champions League	Group B	ŽRK Budućnost Podgorica	(Austria) Hypo Niederösterreich	26-25	27-34
2008-09	EHF Champions League	Group B	ŽRK Budućnost Podgorica	(Denmark) FCK Håndbold	25-22	22-22
2008-09	EHF Champions League	Stage 2 / Group 2	ŽRK Budućnost Podgorica	(Romania) Oltchim Vâlcea	23-22	22-31
2008-09	EHF Champions League	Stage 2 / Group 2	ŽRK Budućnost Podgorica	(Hungary) Győri ETO	26-26	27-31
2008-09	EHF Champions League	Stage 2 / Group 2	ŽRK Budućnost Podgorica	(Slovenia) Krim Ljubljana	37-32	28-35
2009-10	EHF Champions League	Group D	ŽRK Budućnost Podgorica	(Norway) Larvik	23-27	22-29
2009-10	EHF Champions League	Group D	ŽRK Budućnost Podgorica	(Russia) Dynamo Volgograd	24-24	18-31
2009-10	EHF Champions League	Group D	ŽRK Budućnost Podgorica	(Denmark) FCK Håndbold	26-22	25-22
2009-10	EHF Cup Winners' Cup	Round of 16	ŽRK Budućnost Podgorica	(Hungary) Debreceni	28-20	20-27
2009-10	EHF Cup Winners' Cup	Quarterfinals	ŽRK Budućnost Podgorica	(Norway) Storhamar	35-20	22-28
2009-10	EHF Cup Winners' Cup	Semifinals	ŽRK Budućnost Podgorica	(France) Metz Handball	28-21	28-27
2009-10	EHF Cup Winners' Cup	FINAL	ŽRK Budućnost Podgorica	(Denmark) Vejen	18-16	23-20
2009-10	Women's EHF Challenge Cup	Round 2	ŽRK Biseri Pljevlja	(Netherlands) Dalfsen	21-28	
2009-10	Women's EHF Challenge Cup	Round 2	ŽRK Biseri Pljevlja	(Czech Republic) Sokol Pisek	31-32	
2009-10	Women's EHF Challenge Cup	Round 2	ŽRK Biseri Pljevlja	(Bosnia and Herzegovina) Ilidža	33-37	
2010-11	EHF Champions League	Group A	ŽRK Budućnost Podgorica	(Russia) Dynamo Volgograd	29-22	32-27
2010-11	EHF Champions League	Group A	ŽRK Budućnost Podgorica	(Denmark) Viborg	32-24	34-25
2010-11	EHF Champions League	Group A	ŽRK Budućnost Podgorica	(Sweden) Sävehof	33-26	33-24
2010-11	EHF Champions League	Stage 2 / Group 1	ŽRK Budućnost Podgorica	(Romania) Oltchim Vâlcea	32-21	20-21
2010-11	EHF Champions League	Stage 2 / Group 1	ŽRK Budućnost Podgorica	(Slovenia) Krim Ljubljana	32-29	40-36
2010-11	EHF Champions League	Stage 2 / Group 1	ŽRK Budućnost Podgorica	(Spain) Itxako Navarra	30-22	26-31
2010-11	EHF Champions League	Semifinals	ŽRK Budućnost Podgorica	(Norway) Larvik	24-27	25-20
2010-11	EHF Cup Winners' Cup	Round 3	ŽRK Biseri Pljevlja	(Sweden) Lugi	30-28	17-24
2011-12	EHF Champions League	Group A	ŽRK Budućnost Podgorica	(Germany) Thüringer	35-25	27-23
2011-12	EHF Champions League	Group A	ŽRK Budućnost Podgorica	(Norway) Byåsen Trondheim	28-18	34-24
2011-12	EHF Champions League	Group A	ŽRK Budućnost Podgorica	(Denmark) Midtjylland	28-25	20-34
2011-12	EHF Champions League	Stage 2 / Group 2	ŽRK Budućnost Podgorica	(France) Metz Handball	32-26	29-27
2011-12	EHF Champions League	Stage 2 / Group 2	ŽRK Budućnost Podgorica	(Slovenia) Krim Ljubljana	29-21	27-26
2011-12	EHF Champions League	Stage 2 / Group 2	ŽRK Budućnost Podgorica	(Romania) Oltchim Vâlcea	31-25	34-24
2011-12	EHF Champions League	Semifinals	ŽRK Budućnost Podgorica	(Norway) Larvik	23-13	22-20
2011-12	EHF Champions League	FINAL	ŽRK Budućnost Podgorica	(Hungary) Győri ETO	27-25	27-29
2011-12	Women's EHF Cup	Round 1	ŽRK Biseri Pljevlja	(Austria) Kärnten Twisters	19-31	21-31
2012-13	EHF Champions League	Group D	ŽRK Budućnost Podgorica	(Russia) Zvezda Zvenigorod	29-21	25-31
2012-13	EHF Champions League	Group D	ŽRK Budućnost Podgorica	(Denmark) Viborg	26-23	26-20
2012-13	EHF Champions League	Group D	ŽRK Budućnost Podgorica	(Germany) Thüringer	23-15	20-24
2012-13	EHF Champions League	Stage 2 / Group 1	ŽRK Budućnost Podgorica	(Hungary) Győri ETO	21-22	17-27
2012-13	EHF Champions League	Stage 2 / Group 1	ŽRK Budućnost Podgorica	(Norway) Larvik	18-20	16-28
2012-13	EHF Champions League	Stage 2 / Group 1	ŽRK Budućnost Podgorica	(Denmark) Randers	24-22	20-20
2012-13	Women's EHF Cup	Round 1	ŽRK Biseri Pljevlja	(Romania) Dunărea Brăila	15-33	14-39
2013-14	EHF Champions League	Group B	ŽRK Budućnost Podgorica	(Poland) Lublin	31-19	30-22
2013-14	EHF Champions League	Group B	ŽRK Budućnost Podgorica	(Hungary) Ferencvárosi Budapest	29-21	25-27
2013-14	EHF Champions League	Group B	ŽRK Budućnost Podgorica	(Denmark) Midtjylland	22-15	19-21
2013-14	EHF Champions League	Stage 2 / Group 2	ŽRK Budućnost Podgorica	(Hungary) Győri ETO	26-26	23-23
2013-14	EHF Champions League	Stage 2 / Group 2	ŽRK Budućnost Podgorica	(Slovenia) Krim Ljubljana	30-15	30-26
2013-14	EHF Champions League	Stage 2 / Group 2	ŽRK Budućnost Podgorica	(Norway) Larvik	19-19	22-17
2013-14	EHF Champions League	Semifinals	ŽRK Budućnost Podgorica	(North Macedonia) Vardar Skopje	22-20	
2013-14	EHF Champions League	FINAL	ŽRK Budućnost Podgorica	(Hungary) Győri ETO	21-27	
2013-14	Women's EHF Challenge Cup	Round 3	ŽRK Danilovgrad	(Serbia) Naisa Niš	25-24	17-23
2014-15	EHF Champions League	Group B	ŽRK Budućnost Podgorica	(North Macedonia) Vardar Skopje	23-17	24-24
2014-15	EHF Champions League	Group B	ŽRK Budućnost Podgorica	(Croatia) Podravka Koprivnica	32-26	32-27
2014-15	EHF Champions League	Group B	ŽRK Budućnost Podgorica	(Germany) Thüringer	23-14	27-22
2014-15	EHF Champions League	Stage 2 / Group 1	ŽRK Budućnost Podgorica	(Russia) Dynamo Volgograd	26-18	25-18
2014-15	EHF Champions League	Stage 2 / Group 1	ŽRK Budućnost Podgorica	(Germany) Leipzig	28-21	32-19
2014-15	EHF Champions League	Stage 2 / Group 1	ŽRK Budućnost Podgorica	(Slovenia) Krim Ljubljana	39-20	23-20
2014-15	EHF Champions League	Quarterfinals	ŽRK Budućnost Podgorica	(Denmark) Viborg	29-19	28-22
2014-15	EHF Champions League	Semifinals	ŽRK Budućnost Podgorica	(North Macedonia) Vardar Skopje	27-17	
2014-15	EHF Champions League	FINAL	ŽRK Budućnost Podgorica	(Norway) Larvik	26-22	
2014-15	EHF Cup Winners' Cup	Round 2	ŽRK Danilovgrad	(Norway) Byåsen	27-27	16-34
2015-16	EHF Champions League	Group D	ŽRK Budućnost Podgorica	(Sweden) Sävehof	33-20	25-18
2015-16	EHF Champions League	Group D	ŽRK Budućnost Podgorica	(Poland) Lublin	29-25	31-23
2015-16	EHF Champions League	Group D	ŽRK Budućnost Podgorica	(Romania) CSM București	23-23	28-22
2015-16	EHF Champions League	Stage 2 / Group 2	ŽRK Budućnost Podgorica	(Hungary) Győri ETO	25-22	20-22
2015-16	EHF Champions League	Stage 2 / Group 2	ŽRK Budućnost Podgorica	(North Macedonia) Vardar Skopje	31-19	24-26
2015-16	EHF Champions League	Stage 2 / Group 2	ŽRK Budućnost Podgorica	(Denmark) Midtjylland	27-21	28-18
2015-16	EHF Champions League	Quarterfinals	ŽRK Budućnost Podgorica	(Romania) HCM Baia Mare	32-25	29-24
2015-16	EHF Champions League	Semifinals	ŽRK Budućnost Podgorica	(Hungary) Győri ETO	20-21	
2015-16	EHF Champions League	3rd Place Match	ŽRK Budućnost Podgorica	(North Macedonia) Vardar Skopje	28-30	
2015-16	Women's EHF Challenge Cup	Round 3	ŽRK Danilovgrad	(Slovenia) Ajdovščina	24-30	18-22
2016-17	EHF Champions League	Group A	ŽRK Budućnost Podgorica	(France) Metz	21-19	25-28
2016-17	EHF Champions League	Group A	ŽRK Budućnost Podgorica	(Germany) Thüringer	28-19	32-26
2016-17	EHF Champions League	Group A	ŽRK Budućnost Podgorica	(Norway) Glassverket	22-21	30-23
2016-17	EHF Champions League	Group 1	ŽRK Budućnost Podgorica	(North Macedonia) Vardar Skopje	28-31	31-28
2016-17	EHF Champions League	Group 1	ŽRK Budućnost Podgorica	(Hungary) Ferencvárosi Budapest	25-33	24-23
2016-17	EHF Champions League	Group 1	ŽRK Budućnost Podgorica	(Russia) Astrakhanochka	38-20	34-21
2016-17	EHF Champions League	Quarterfinals	ŽRK Budućnost Podgorica	(Norway) Larvik	31-17	35-30
2016-17	EHF Champions League	Semifinals	ŽRK Budućnost Podgorica	(Hungary) Győri ETO	20-26	
2016-17	EHF Champions League	3rd Place Match	ŽRK Budućnost Podgorica	(Romania) CSM București	20-26	
2016-17	Women's EHF Challenge Cup	Round 3	ŽRK Danilovgrad	(Turkey) Ardeşen GSK	24-28	23-30
2017-18	EHF Champions League	Group D	ŽRK Budućnost Podgorica	(France) Metz	23-18	23-27
2017-18	EHF Champions League	Group D	ŽRK Budućnost Podgorica	(Germany) Bietigheim	32-24	21-27
2017-18	EHF Champions League	Group D	ŽRK Budućnost Podgorica	(Norway) Vipers Kristiansand	26-23	19-29
2017-18	EHF Champions League	Group 2	ŽRK Budućnost Podgorica	(North Macedonia) Vardar Skopje	25-30	24-31
2017-18	EHF Champions League	Group 2	ŽRK Budućnost Podgorica	(Hungary) Ferencvárosi Budapest	23-24	26-34
2017-18	EHF Champions League	Group 2	ŽRK Budućnost Podgorica	(Germany) Thüringer	29-21	25-24
2017-18	EHF Champions League	Quarterfinals	ŽRK Budućnost Podgorica	(Hungary) Győri ETO	20-26	28-30
2018-19	EHF Champions League	Group A	ŽRK Budućnost Podgorica	(France) Metz	23-19	24-25
2018-19	EHF Champions League	Group A	ŽRK Budućnost Podgorica	(Denmark) Odense Håndbold	31-28	26-22
2018-19	EHF Champions League	Group A	ŽRK Budućnost Podgorica	(Norway) Larvik	26-25	22-23
2018-19	EHF Champions League	Group 1	ŽRK Budućnost Podgorica	(Russia) Rostov-Don	20-23	22-24
2018-19	EHF Champions League	Group 1	ŽRK Budućnost Podgorica	(Denmark) København Håndbold	29-27	20-31
2018-19	EHF Champions League	Group 1	ŽRK Budućnost Podgorica	(France) Brest Bretagne	28-27	22-22
2018-19	EHF Champions League	Quarterfinals	ŽRK Budućnost Podgorica	(Norway) Vipers Kristiansand	19-24	18-25
2019-20	EHF Champions League	Group A	ŽRK Budućnost Podgorica	(France) Brest Bretagne	32-25	28-32
2019-20	EHF Champions League	Group A	ŽRK Budućnost Podgorica	(Romania) Râmnicu Vâlcea	23-19	21-20
2019-20	EHF Champions League	Group A	ŽRK Budućnost Podgorica	(Germany) Bietigheim	34-28	30-23
2019-20	EHF Champions League	Group 1	ŽRK Budućnost Podgorica	(Hungary) Győri ETO	27-28	24-26
2019-20	EHF Champions League	Group 1	ŽRK Budućnost Podgorica	(Slovenia) Krim Ljubljana	30-28	23-29
2019-20	EHF Champions League	Group 1	ŽRK Budućnost Podgorica	(Sweden) Sävehof	30-25	33-24
2019-20	Women's EHF Challenge Cup	Round 3	ŽRK Rudar Pljevlja	(Lithuania) Žalgiris Kaunas	19-26	18-24
2020-21	EHF Champions League	Group B	ŽRK Budućnost Podgorica	(Hungary) Győri ETO	21-26	29-34
2020-21	EHF Champions League	Group B	ŽRK Budućnost Podgorica	(Russia) CSKA Moscow	22-25	23-27
2020-21	EHF Champions League	Group B	ŽRK Budućnost Podgorica	(France) Brest Bretagne	22-22	28-28
2020-21	EHF Champions League	Group B	ŽRK Budućnost Podgorica	(Denmark) Odense Håndbold	27-24	21-30
2020-21	EHF Champions League	Group B	ŽRK Budućnost Podgorica	(Romania) Râmnicu Vâlcea	29-28	23-25
2020-21	EHF Champions League	Group B	ŽRK Budućnost Podgorica	(Germany) Borussia Dortmund	31-27	28-26
2020-21	EHF Champions League	Group B	ŽRK Budućnost Podgorica	(Croatia) Podravka Koprivnica	33-26	26-29
2020-21	EHF Champions League	Round of 16	ŽRK Budućnost Podgorica	(Hungary) Ferencvárosi Budapest	22-19	28-29
2020-21	EHF Champions League	Quarterfinals	ŽRK Budućnost Podgorica	(Hungary) Győri ETO	19-30	21-24
2021-22	EHF Champions League	Group A	ŽRK Budućnost Podgorica	(Denmark) Esbjerg	25-36	20-35
2021-22	EHF Champions League	Group A	ŽRK Budućnost Podgorica	(Russia) Rostov-Don	19-25	20-30
2021-22	EHF Champions League	Group A	ŽRK Budućnost Podgorica	(Hungary) Ferencvárosi Budapest	26-30	22-36
2021-22	EHF Champions League	Group A	ŽRK Budućnost Podgorica	(France) Brest Bretagne	30-28	21-25
2021-22	EHF Champions League	Group A	ŽRK Budućnost Podgorica	(Romania) CSM București	20-28	22-30
2021-22	EHF Champions League	Group A	ŽRK Budućnost Podgorica	(Germany) Borussia Dortmund	29-34	34-30
2021-22	EHF Champions League	Group A	ŽRK Budućnost Podgorica	(Croatia) Podravka Koprivnica	27-21	22-29
2022-23	EHF Champions League	Group B	ŽRK Budućnost Podgorica	(France) Metz	28-36	23-29
2022-23	EHF Champions League	Group B	ŽRK Budućnost Podgorica	(Hungary) Győri ETO	22-25	19-32
2022-23	EHF Champions League	Group B	ŽRK Budućnost Podgorica	(Denmark) Esbjerg	23-28	20-30
2022-23	EHF Champions League	Group B	ŽRK Budućnost Podgorica	(Romania) CS Rapid București	30-30	29-39
2022-23	EHF Champions League	Group B	ŽRK Budućnost Podgorica	(Norway) Storhamar	24-23	27-25
2022-23	EHF Champions League	Group B	ŽRK Budućnost Podgorica	(Turkey) Kastamonu	10-0	40-27
2022-23	EHF Champions League	Group B	ŽRK Budućnost Podgorica	(Croatia) Lokomotiva Zagreb	25-18	25-24
2022-23	EHF Champions League	Round of 16	ŽRK Budućnost Podgorica	(Hungary) Ferencvárosi Budapest	24-28	22-27

== Opponents by countries ==
Below is the list of performances of Montenegrin clubs against opponents in EHF competitions by their countries (handball federations).

Opponents' country	G	W	D	L
Austria	12	5	1	6
Azerbaijan	2	1	0	1
Belarus	2	1	0	1
Bosnia and Herzegovina	2	0	0	2
Bulgaria	2	1	0	1
Croatia	10	7	1	2
Czech Republic	3	1	1	1
Cyprus	2	2	0	0
Denmark	44	24	6	14
Faroe Islands	2	1	0	1
France	26	15	3	8
Georgia	2	2	0	0
Germany	34	24	1	9
Hungary	57	11	6	40
Israel	2	2	0	0
Italy	2	2	0	0
Lithuania	6	3	0	3
Netherlands	1	0	0	1
North Macedonia	15	7	1	7
Norway	41	23	3	15
Poland	6	5	0	1
Portugal	3	2	0	1
Romania	27	12	2	15
Russia	28	10	2	16
Serbia	2	1	0	1
Slovakia	6	4	1	1
Slovenia	24	14	0	10
Spain	22	15	0	7
Sweden	8	7	0	1
Switzerland	2	2	0	0
Turkey	6	4	0	2
Ukraine	6	5	1	0

As of the end of EHF competitions 2022–23 season.

== See also ==
- Montenegrin First League of Women's Handball
- Montenegrin Women's Handball Cup
- Women's EHF Champions League
- Sport in Montenegro
