= Handball Federation of Montenegro =

Handball governing body in Montenegro

Handball Federation of Montenegro Montenegrin: Rukometni savez Crne Gore RSCG
- IOC nation: Montenegro (MNE)
- Sport: Handball
- Other sports: Beach Handball; Wheelchair Handball
- Official website: www.rscg.me

HISTORY
- Year of formation: 26 January 1958; 68 years ago

AFFILIATIONS
- International federation: International Handball Federation (IHF)
- IHF member since: 2007; 19 years ago
- Continental association: European Handball Federation
- National Olympic Committee: Montenegrin Olympic Committee
- Other affiliation(s): Mediterranean Handball Confederation

GOVERNING BODY
- President: Mr. Zoran Radojičić (Montenegro)

HEADQUARTERS
- Address: Podgorica
- Country: Montenegro
- Secretary General: Mr. Emir Bešlija (Montenegro)

The Handball Federation of Montenegro (RSCG) (Montenegrin: Rukometni savez Crne Gore) is the governing body of team handball in Montenegro. It is based in Podgorica.

It organizes the handball leagues:

- Montenegrin First League of Men's Handball
- Montenegrin Second League of Men's Handball
- Montenegrin First League of Women's Handball
- Montenegrin Second League of Women's Handball

It also organizes the Montenegrin national handball team and the Montenegrin women's national handball team as well as the Montenegrin national under-21 handball team and Montenegrin women's national under-21 handball team.

== History ==
The Handball Federation of Montenegro was founded on 26 January 1958, while under the Yugoslav Handball Federation. Upon Montenegro's independence from Serbia and Montenegro, the Handball Federation of Montenegro represented the country. It joined the European Handball Federation and the International Handball Federation on 7 August 2006.

== Presidents ==
- Mirčeta Pešić (1961-1964)
- Slobodan Filipović (1964-1974)
- Osman Šabanadžović (1974-1982)
- Milan Paović (1982-1983)
- Slobodan Koljević(1983-1984)
- Rade Đuričković(1984-1985)
- Ratko Nikolić (1985-1990)
- Jusuf Bibezić (1990-1994)
- Radovan Nikolić (1994-1998)
- Radomir Đurđić (1998–Present)
