= ŽRK Danilovgrad =

- Full name: Ženski Rukometni Klub Danilovgrad
- Arena: Univerzitetska dvorana
- League: Prva Liga
- 2015-2016: 2nd

ŽRK Danilovgrad is a women's handball club from Danilovgrad in Montenegro. ŽRK Danilovgrad competes in the Prva Liga.

== European record ==
Season	Competition	Round	Club	Home	Away	Aggregate
2016-17	Challenge Cup	R3	(Turkey) Ardeşen GSK	24–28	23–30	47–58

== Team ==
=== Current squad ===
Squad for the 2016–17 season

Goalkeepers

- (Montenegro) Anastasija Coguric
- (Montenegro) Tea Marinović
- (Montenegro) Darija Zecevic

Wingers
RW

- (Montenegro) Aneta Adzic
- (Montenegro) Milica Karapic

LW

- (Montenegro) Branka Konatar

Line Players

- (Montenegro) Jelena Scepanovic

Back players
LB

- (Montenegro) Enisa Djokovic
- (Montenegro) Maja Ikovic
- (Montenegro) Tamara Jovicevic
- (Montenegro) Ivana Novakovic
- (Montenegro) Ana Saranovic

CB

- (Montenegro) Tatjana Brnovic
- (Montenegro) Marija Terzic
- (Montenegro) Tamara Vukovic

RB

- (Montenegro) Lejla Bosnjak
- (Montenegro) Ivana Carapic
