= Montenegrin First League of Women's Handball =

- Sport: Handball
- Founded: 2006
- Founder: Handball Federation of Montenegro
- No. of teams: 6
- Country: Montenegro
- Continent: (European Union) Europe
- Most recent champion: Budućnost
- Most titles: Budućnost (16 titles in independent Montenegro, 34 overall)
- Broadcaster: RTCG
- International cups: Champions League; EHF Cup; Challenge Cup
- Website: Montenegrin Handball Federation

The Montenegrin First League of Women's Handball is the top women's team handball league in Montenegro. It is organised by the Handball Federation of Montenegro.

== History ==
=== Before independence ===
Since 2006, Montenegrin women's handball clubs played in the competitions of SFR Yugoslavia, FR Yugoslavia and Serbia and Montenegro. Most successful was ŽRK Budućnost Podgorica, who gained 18 champion titles in Yugoslav championship, with three European trophies (1985, 1986, 2006). Budućnost was most successful Yugoslav handball club, and except them, in the Yugoslav First League played ŽRK Danilovgrad.
ŽRK Budućnost was the first Montenegrin team which participated in Yugoslav handball competitions for women. They debuted in the top-tier on season 1981-82 and soon after that begun era of their huge successes. After hard struggle with RK Radnički from Belgrade, ŽRK Budućnost won their first ever title on season 1984–85. Four years later, they won another title, defended next season. After the 1990-91 edition, finished with sensational trophy winning by ŽRK Lokomotiva Zagreb, team from Podgorica was the title holder in the last season of SFR Yugoslavia league (1991–92).
Below is the list of all-time participants of Montenegrin clubs in the First League of SFR Yugoslavia.

Club	82	83	84	85	86	87	88	89	90	91	92
Budućnost	9	10	2	1	3	2	2	1	1	2	1
Danilovgrad	-	-	-	12	-	12	-	-	-	-	-

In FR Yugoslavia / Serbia and Montenegro, ŽRK Budućnost dominated during the every single season, so they won 14 consecutive titles (1992–93, 1993-1994, 1994–95, 1995–96, 1996–97, 1997–98, 1998–99, 1999-00, 2000–01, 2001–02, 2002–03, 2003–04, 2004–05 and 2005–06).

=== After independence ===
Soon after the Montenegrin independence referendum, Handball Federation of Montenegro founded its own competitions, with the First League as a top-tier competition for women. The league have two phases. In the first (regular season) participate six teams. Best three squads from regular season are qualifying for the final phase, together with ŽRK Budućnost Podgorica, who's not participant of the first phase.
During the history, ŽRK Budućnost was strongly dominant side, won every single trophy of national champion.
Except all domestic competitions, ŽRK Budućnost won the EHF Champions League on seasons 2011–12 and 2014–15, and EHF Cup Winners' Cup 2009-10.

== EHF league ranking ==
EHF League Ranking for 2022/23 season:

- 5. (6) (Norway) REMA 1000-ligaen (102.17)
- 6. (4) (Romania) Liga Națională (94.50)
- 7. (7) (Montenegro) Prva Liga (61.33)
- 8. (9) (Croatia) 1. HRL (57.00)
- 9. (8) (Germany) Handball Bundesliga Frauen (56.33)

== Champions ==
From the inaugural season (2006/07), ŽRK Budućnost Podgorica won all the champion titles in Montenegrin First League of Women's Handball.

=== Titles by season ===
Season	Champion	Runner up
2006–07	ŽRK Budućnost Podgorica	ŽRK Nikšić
2007–08	ŽRK Budućnost Podgorica	ŽRK Nikšić
2008–09	ŽRK Budućnost Podgorica	ŽRK Biseri Pljevlja
2009–10	ŽRK Budućnost Podgorica	ŽRK Biseri Pljevlja
2010–11	ŽRK Budućnost Podgorica	ŽRK Biseri Pljevlja
2011–12	ŽRK Budućnost Podgorica	ŽRK Biseri Pljevlja
2012–13	ŽRK Budućnost Podgorica	ŽRK Danilovgrad
2013–14	ŽRK Budućnost Podgorica	ŽRK Danilovgrad
2014–15	ŽRK Budućnost Podgorica	ŽRK Danilovgrad
2015–16	ŽRK Budućnost Podgorica	ŽRK Danilovgrad
2016–17	ŽRK Budućnost Podgorica	ŽRK Danilovgrad
2017–18	ŽRK Budućnost Podgorica	ŽRK Levalea Nikšić
2018–19	ŽRK Budućnost Podgorica	ŽRK Levalea Nikšić
2019–20	Canceled due to the coronavirus pandemic	
2020–21	ŽRK Budućnost Podgorica	ŽRK Levalea Nikšić
2021–22	ŽRK Budućnost Podgorica	ŽRK Rudar Pljevlja
2022–23	ŽRK Budućnost Podgorica	ŽRK Rudar Pljevlja

=== Titles by Club ===
Club	Titles / Montenegro	Years won	Titles / Yugoslavia	Years won
ŽRK Budućnost Podgorica	16	2006–07, 2007–08, 2008–09, 2009–10, 2010–11, 2011–12, 2012–13, 2013–14, 2014–15, 2015–16, 2016–17, 2017–18, 2018–19, 2020-21, 2021-22, 2022-23	18	1984–85, 1988–89, 1989–90, 1991–92, 1992–93, 1993-1994, 1994–95, 1995–96, 1996–97, 1997–98, 1998–99, 1999-00, 2000–01, 2001–02, 2002–03, 2003–04, 2004–05, 2005–06

== Current season ==
Season 2023–24 is 17th edition of Montenegrin women's volley league. League have nine participants. In the first phase, eight teams are playing 14 legs and, after that, first placed team is advancing in the playoff finals against ŽRK Budućnost.

Team	Arena	Capacity	City
ŽRK Budućnost	Bemax Arena	2,500	Podgorica
ŽRK Budućnost 'B'	University Hall	1,000	Podgorica
ŽRK Levalea	Nikšić SC	4,000	Nikšić
ŽRK Mornar	Topolica	3,000	Bar
ŽRK Nikšić	Nikšić SC	4,000	Nikšić
ŽRK Rudar	Ada SC	3,000	Pljevlja
ŽRK Tivat	Župa	900	Tivat
ŽRK Ulcinj	Sports Hall Ulcinj	1,500	Golubovci
ŽRK Zeta	Golubovci Hall	600	Golubovci

== Montenegrin women's handball clubs in WRH League ==
Women Regional Handball League (WRHL) is founded on 2009, and Montenegrin clubs are participating from its inaugural season. As one of strongest European clubs, ŽRK Budućnost Podgorica dominated in the history of competition, often playing seasons without any defeat. So, ŽRK Budućnost won five titles during the six seasons of WRHL.
Below is list of participation of Montenegrin clubs by every season of WRHL.

Club	09	10	11	12	13	14	15	17	18	19
Budućnost	2	1	1	1	1	1	1	2	2	1
Biseri	-	6	6	7	8	-	-	-	-	-
Danilovgrad	-	-	-	-	-	6	2	-	-	-
Rudar	-	-	-	-	-	-	-	-	-	4

== Montenegrin women's handball clubs in European competitions ==
Montenegrin women's handball clubs are participating in the EHF competitions since the season 1984/85.

=== Honours ===
Montenegrin side ŽRK Budućnost Podgorica was successful in the European Cups and today is among the best and most-trophied European and global women's handball teams. They are most successful Montenegrin sports team in European Cups, too. ŽRK Budućnost won six European titles, and among them are:

- EHF Women's Champions League:
  - Winners: 2012, 2015
- Women's EHF Cup Winners' Cup:
  - Winners: 1985, 2006, 2010
- Women's EHF Cup:
  - Winners: 1987

=== All time list ===
Except ŽRK Budućnost, until today, representatives of Montenegro in women's EHF competitions were ŽRK Rudar Pljevlja, ŽRK Biseri Pljevlja, ŽRK Danilovgrad, ŽRK Nikšić and ŽRK Petrol Bonus Podgorica.
Majority of matches are played by ŽRK Budućnost Podgorica.

Team	Seasons	G	W	D	L
ŽRK Budućnost Podgorica	35	377	208	29	140
ŽRK Biseri Pljevlja	5	12	1	0	11
ŽRK Danilovgrad	4	8	1	1	6
ŽRK Petrol Bonus Podgorica	1	4	2	0	2
ŽRK Nikšić	1	4	1	0	3
ŽRK Rudar Pljevlja	1	2	0	0	2

As of the end of EHF competitions 2022–23 season.

== See also ==
- Montenegrin women's handball clubs in European competitions
- Montenegrin Women's Handball Cup
- Women's EHF Champions League
- Montenegrin First League of Men's Handball
