= Handball =

Team sport with two teams of seven players each

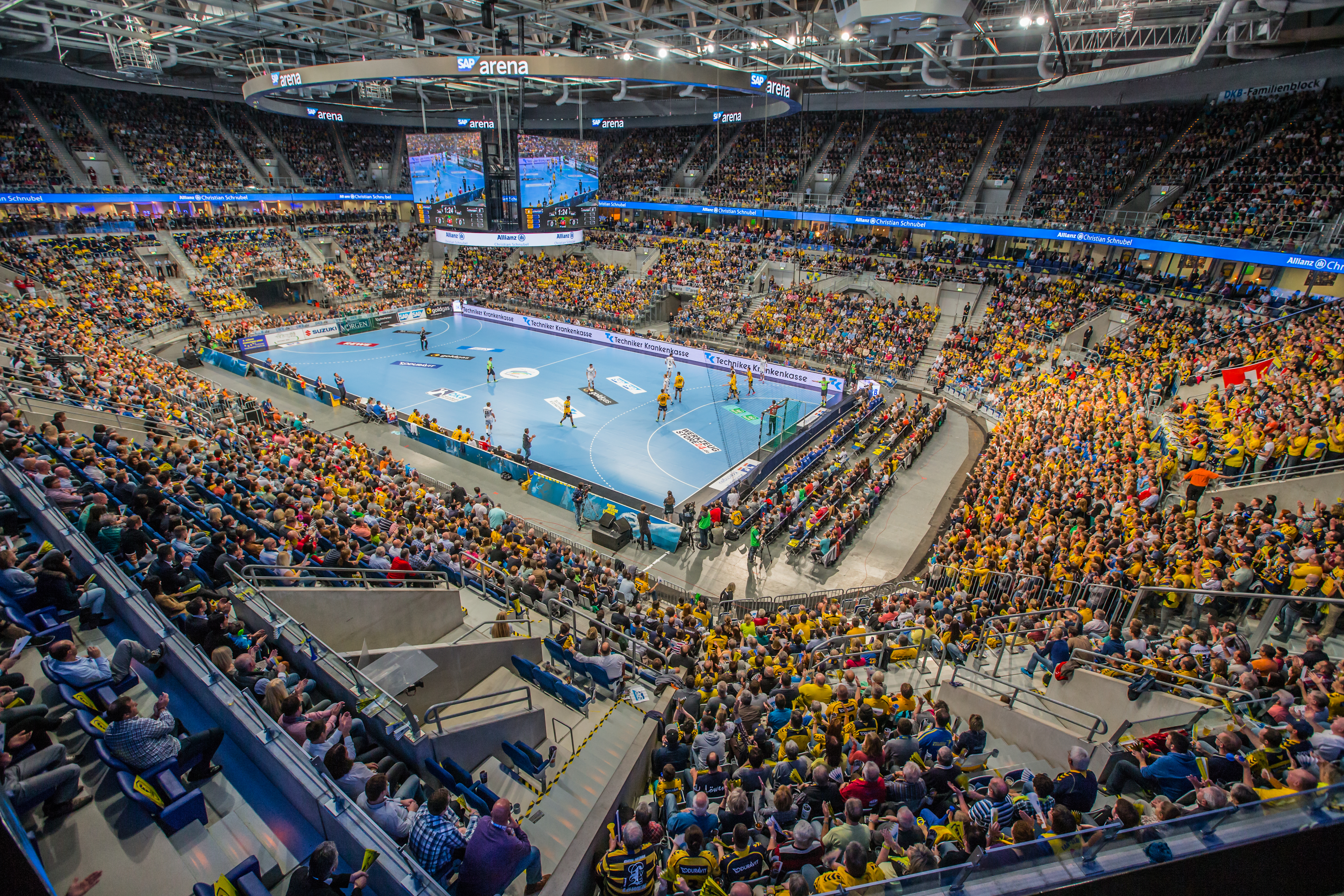
- A handball game in progress at SAP Arena in Mannheim, Germany.
- Highest governing body: IHF
- First played: 2 December 1917; 108 years ago in Berlin, Germany.
- Registered players: > 27 million (2016)

Characteristics
- Contact: Limited
- Team members: 7 per side (including goalkeeper)
- Mixed-sex: Separate competitions
- Type: Team sport, ball sport
- Equipment: Ball and goals
- Venue: Indoor court

Presence
- Country or region: Worldwide; but most popular in Europe
- Olympic: Part of Summer Olympic programme in 1936. Demonstrated at the 1952 Summer Olympics. Returned to the Summer Olympic programme in 1972.
- World Games: Beach handball: 2001–present (invitational sport before 2013)

Handball game highlights video

Handball (also known as team handball, European handball, Olympic handball, or indoor handball) is a team sport in which two teams of seven players each (six outcourt players and a goalkeeper) pass a ball using their hands with the aim of throwing it into the goal of the opposing team. A standard match consists of two periods of 30 minutes, and the team that scores more goals wins.

Modern handball is played on a court of 40 by 20 metres (131 by 66 ft), with a goal in the middle of each end. The goals are surrounded by a 6-metre (20 ft) zone where only the defending goalkeeper is allowed; goals must be scored by throwing the ball from outside the zone or while "diving" into it. The sport is usually played indoors, but outdoor variants exist in the forms of field handball, Czech handball (which were more common in the past) and beach handball. The game is fast and high-scoring: professional teams now typically score between 20 and 35 goals each, though lower scores were not uncommon until a few decades ago. Body contact is permitted for the defenders trying to stop the attackers from approaching the goal. No protective equipment is mandated, but players may wear soft protective bands, pads and mouth guards.

The modern set of rules was published in 1917 by Karl Schelenz, Max Heiser, and Erich Konigh, on 29 October in Berlin, which is seen as the date of birth of the sport. The rules have had several revisions since. The first official handball match was played in 1917 in Germany. Karl Schelenz modified the rules in 1919. The first international games were played (under these rules) with men in 1925 and with women in 1930, both between Germany and Austria.

Men's handball was first played at the Olympics in the 1936 Summer Olympics in Berlin outdoors, and the next time at the 1972 Summer Olympics in Munich indoors; handball has been an Olympic sport since then. Women's handball was added at the 1976 Summer Olympics.

The International Handball Federation was formed in 1946 and, as of 2016, has 197 member federations. The sport is most popular in Europe, and European countries have won all medals but one in the men's Olympic Games tournament since 1972 and men's world championships since 1938. In the women's world championships, only two non-European countries have won the world title - South Korea and Brazil - whilst only the former have also won an Olympic medal. The game also enjoys popularity in East Asia, North Africa and parts of South America.

== Origins and development ==
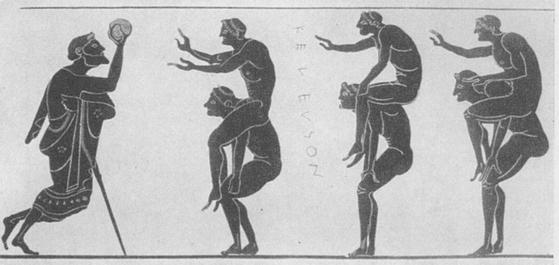
A picture copied from an amphora shows youths playing a version of handball, c. 500 BC.

Games similar to handball were played in Ancient Greece and are represented on amphorae and stone carvings. Although detailed textual reference is rare, there are numerous descriptions of ball games being played where players throw the ball to one another; sometimes this is done in order to avoid interception by a player on the opposing team. Such games were played widely and served as both a form of exercise and a social event.

There is evidence of ancient Roman women playing a version of handball called expulsim ludere. There are records of handball-like games in medieval France, and among the Inuit in Greenland, in the Middle Ages. By the 19th century, there existed similar games of håndbold from Denmark, házená in the Czech Republic, handbol in Ukraine, and torball in Germany.

The team handball game of today was codified at the end of the 19th century in northern Europe: primarily in Denmark, Germany, Norway, and Sweden. The first written set of team handball rules was published in 1906 by the Danish gym teacher, lieutenant and Olympic medalist Holger Nielsen from Ordrup grammar school, north of Copenhagen. The modern set of rules was published by Max Heiser, Karl Schelenz, and Erich Konigh in 1917 on 29 October in Berlin, Germany; this day is therefore seen as the "date of birth" of the sport. The first official handball match was played on 2 December 1917 in Berlin. In 1919 the rules were modified by Karl Schelenz. The first international games were played under these rules, between Germany and Austria by men in 1925 and between Germany and Austria by women in 1930.

In 1926, the Congress of World Athletics (then known as the International Amateur Athletic Federation) nominated a committee to draw up international rules for field handball. The International Amateur Handball Federation was formed in 1928 and later the International Handball Federation was formed in 1946.

Men's field handball was played at the 1936 Summer Olympics in Berlin. During the next several decades, indoor handball flourished and evolved in the Scandinavian countries. The sport re-emerged onto the world stage as men's team handball for the 1972 Summer Olympics in Munich. Women's team handball was added at the 1976 Summer Olympics in Montreal. Due to its popularity in the region, the Eastern European countries that refined the event became the dominant force in the sport when it was reintroduced.

The International Amateur Handball Federation (IAHF) organised the first men's world championship in 1938; after its foundation in 1946, the International Handball Federation held it every four (sometimes three) years until 1995. Since the 1995 world championship in Iceland, the competition has been held every two years. The women's world championship has been held since 1957. The IHF also organizes women's and men's junior world championships. By July 2009, the IHF listed 166 member federations – approximately 795,000 teams and 19 million players.

== Rules ==
The rules are laid out in the IHF Rules of the Game; the current edition is dated 1 March 2025 and includes amendments that took effect on 1 July 2025.

=== Summary ===
Two teams of seven players (six court players plus one goalkeeper) take the court and attempt to score points by putting the game ball into the opposing team's goal. In handling the ball, players are subject to the following restrictions:

- After receiving the ball, players can pass, keep possession, or shoot the ball.
- Court players may not touch the ball with the foot or lower leg, unless the ball has been thrown at them by an opponent. The goalkeeper may touch the ball with any part of the body, including the feet, when defending inside the goal area, but may not touch a ball that is moving towards the playing area with the lower leg or foot.
- If possessing the ball, players must dribble (comparable to a basketball dribble), or can take up to three steps for up to three seconds at a time without dribbling.
- No attacking or defending players other than the defending goalkeeper are allowed to touch the floor of the goal area (within six metres of the goal). A shot or pass in the goal area is valid if completed before touching the floor. Goalkeepers are allowed outside the goal area, but are not allowed to cross the goal area boundary with the ball in their hands.
- The ball may not be passed back to the goalkeeper when they are positioned in the goal area.

Notable scoring opportunities can occur when attacking players jump into the goal area. For example, an attacking player may catch a pass while launching toward the inside of the goal area, and then shoot or pass before touching the floor. Doubling occurs when a diving attacking player passes to another diving teammate.

=== Playing court ===
Schematic diagram of a handball court

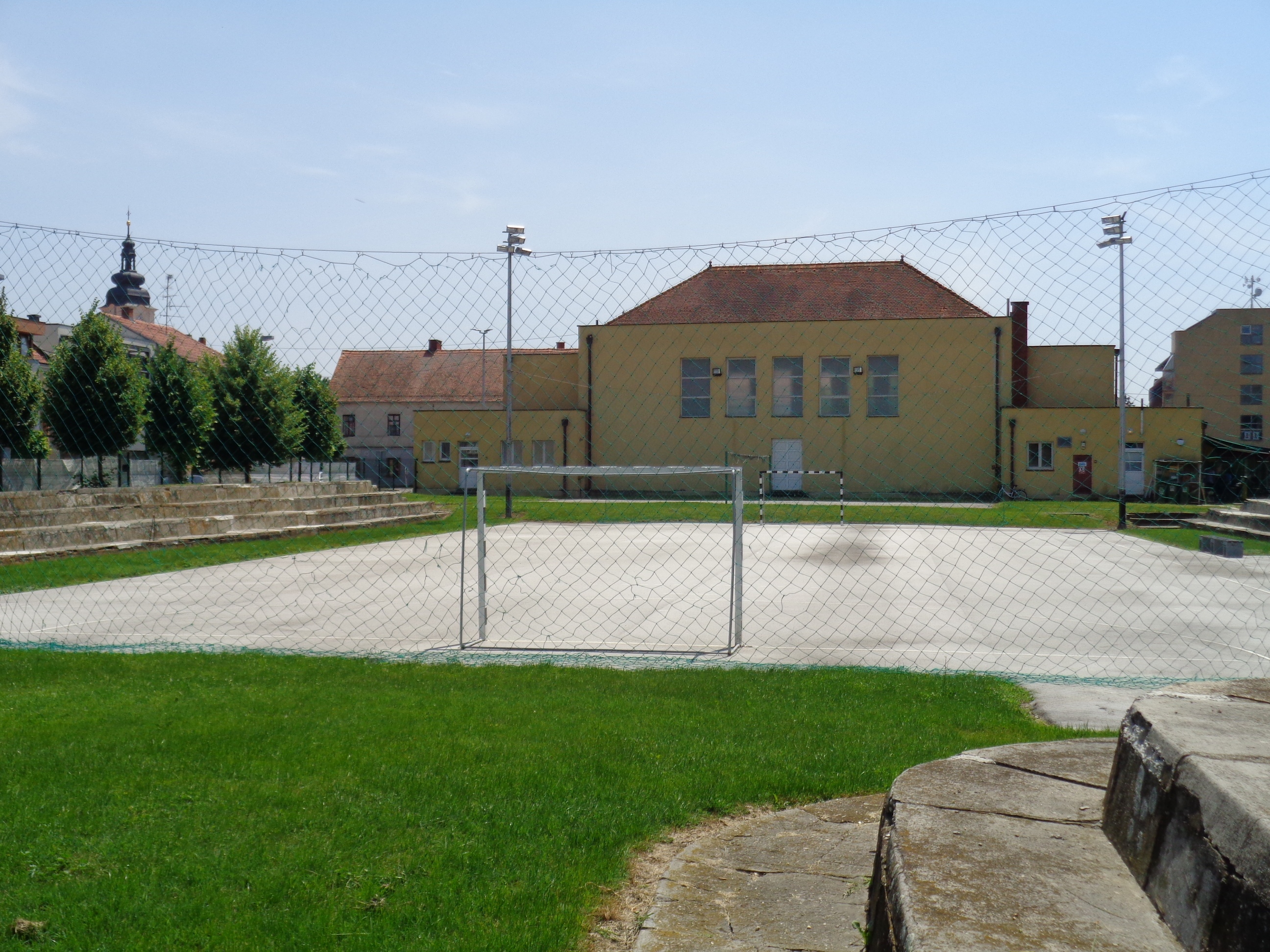
An outdoor handball court

Handball is played on a court 40 by 20 metres (131 ft 3 in × 65 ft 7 in), with a goal in the centre of each end. The goals are surrounded by a near-semicircular area, called the zone or the crease, defined by a line six metres from the goal. A dashed near-semicircular line nine metres from the goal marks the free-throw line. Each line on the court is part of the area it encompasses; the centre line belongs to both halves at the same time.

==== Goals ====
The goals are two metres high and three metres wide. They must be securely bolted either to the floor or the wall behind.

The goal posts and the crossbar must be made out of the same material (e.g., wood or aluminium) and feature a quadratic cross section with sides of 8 cm (3 in). The three sides of the beams visible from the playing court must be painted alternatingly in two contrasting colours which both have to contrast against the background. The colours on both goals must be the same.

Each goal must feature a net. This must be fastened in such a way that a ball thrown into the goal does not leave or pass the goal under normal circumstances. If necessary, a second net may be clasped to the back of the net on the inside.

==== Crease ====
The goals are surrounded by the crease, also called the zone. This area is delineated by two quarter circles with a radius of six metres around the far corners of each goal post and a connecting line parallel to the goal line. Only the defending goalkeeper is allowed inside this zone. Court players may catch and touch the ball in the air within it as long as the player starts their jump outside the zone and releases the ball before they land (landing inside the perimeter is allowed in this case as long as the ball has been released).

If a player without the ball contacts the ground inside the goal perimeter, or the line surrounding the perimeter, they must take the most direct path out of it. Should a player cross the zone in an attempt to gain an advantage (e.g., better position) their team cedes the ball. Similarly, violation of the zone by a defending player is penalized only if they do so in order to gain an advantage in defending.

==== Substitution area ====
Outside of one long edge of the court to both sides of the middle line are the substitution areas for each team. Team officials, substitutes, and suspended players must wait within this area. A team's area is the same side as the goal the team is defending; during halftime, substitution areas are swapped. Any player entering or leaving the play must cross the substitution line which is part of the sideline and extends 4.5 metres (15 ft) from the middle line to the team's side.

=== Duration ===
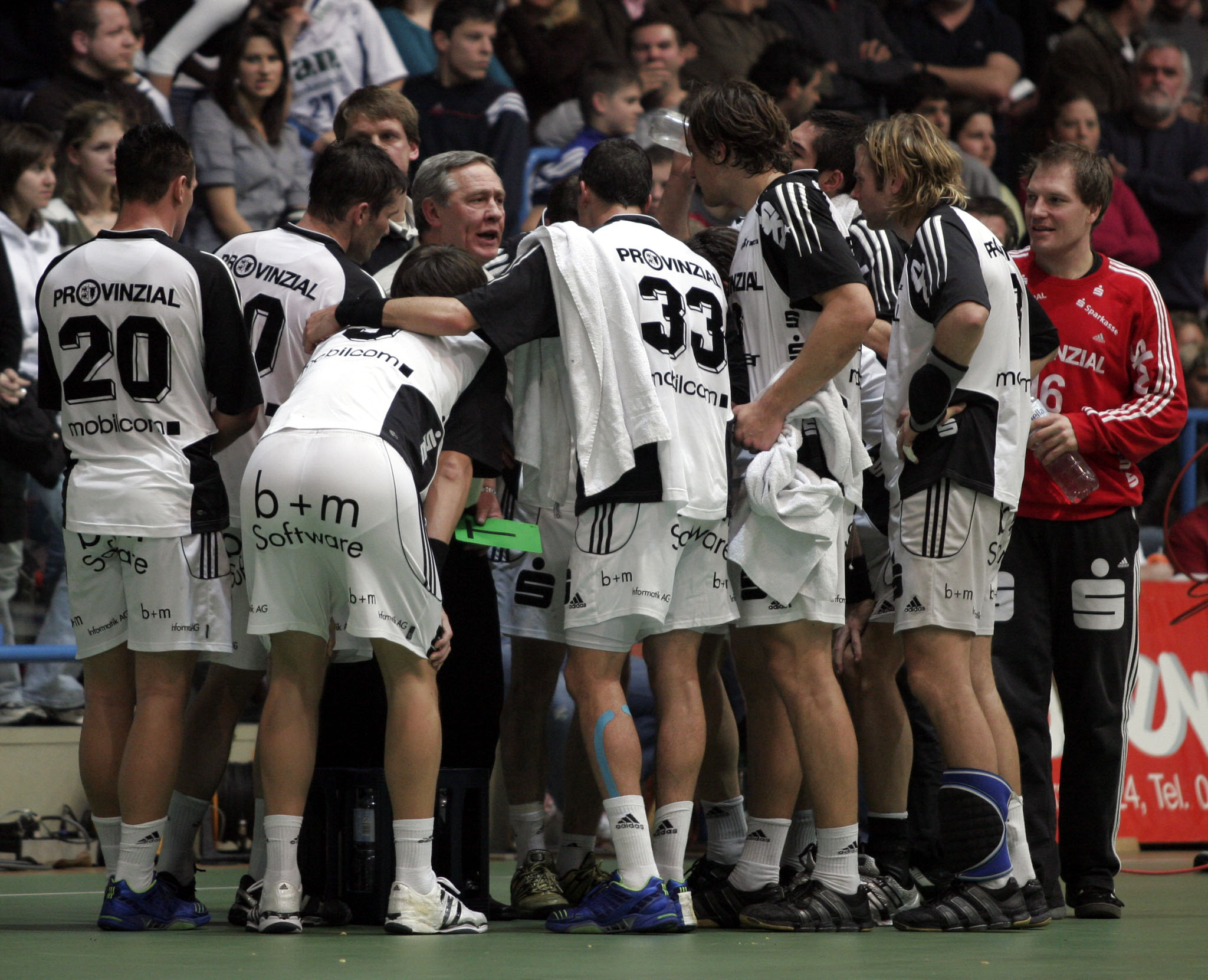
Team timeout

A standard match has two 30-minute halves with a 10- or 15-minute (major Championships/Olympics) halftime intermission. At half-time, teams switch sides of the court as well as benches. For youths, the length of the halves is reduced—25 minutes at ages 12 to 15, and 20 minutes at ages 8 to 11; though national federations of some countries may differ in their implementation from the official guidelines.

If a decision must be reached in a particular match (e.g., in a tournament) and it ends in a draw after regular time, there are at maximum two overtimes, each consisting of two straight 5-minute periods with a one-minute break in between. If these does not decide the game either, then the winning team is determined in a penalty shootout (best-of-five rounds; if still tied, extra rounds are added until one team wins).

The referees may call timeout according to their sole discretion; typical reasons are injuries, suspensions, or court cleaning. Penalty throws should trigger a timeout only for lengthy delays, such as a change of the goalkeeper.

Under the basic rule, each team may call one team timeout of one minute per half of regular playing time. The IHF, continental and national federations may instead allow three team timeouts per game, with no more than two per half and only one in the last five minutes of regular playing time; the opponent must have had possession at least once between two timeouts of the same team. Team timeouts cannot be called during overtime.

=== Referees ===
A handball match is adjudicated by two equal referees. Some national bodies allow games with only a single referee in special cases like illness on short notice. Should the referees disagree on any occasion, a decision is made on mutual agreement during a short timeout; or, in case of punishments, the more severe of the two comes into effect. The referees are obliged to make their decisions "on the basis of their observations of facts". Their judgements are final and can be appealed against only if not in compliance with the rules. Officials can look to TV replays, as needed.

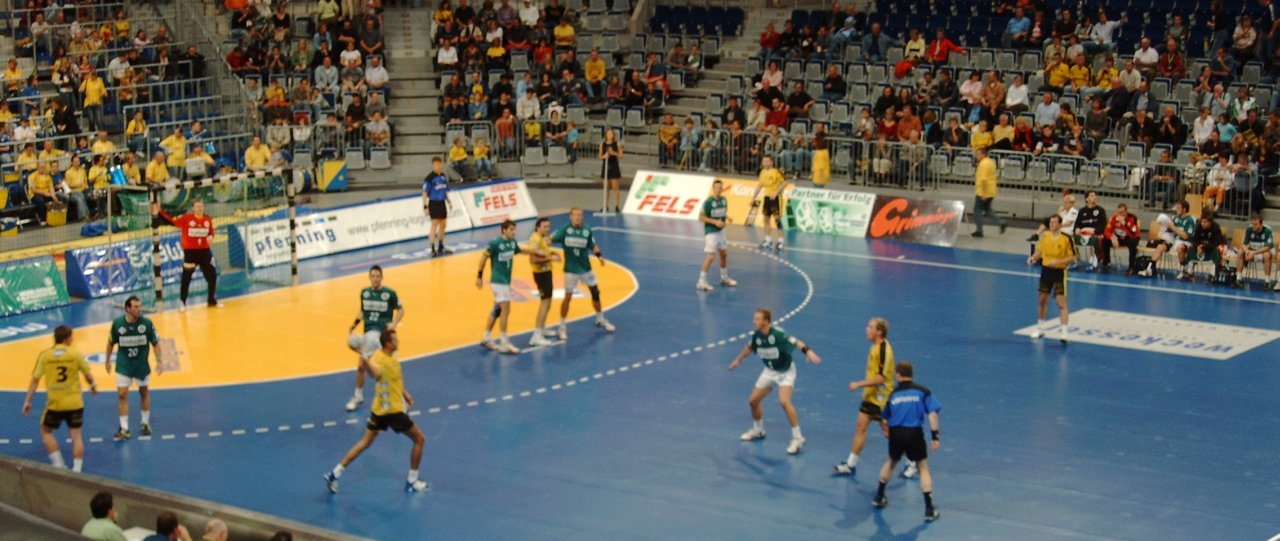
The referees (blue shirts) keep both teams between them.

The referees position themselves in such a way that the team players are confined between them. They stand diagonally aligned so that each can observe one side line. Depending on their positions, one is called court referee and the other goal referee. These positions automatically switch on ball turnover. They physically exchange their positions approximately every 10 minutes (long exchange), and change sides every five minutes (short exchange).

The IHF defines 17 hand signals for quick visual communication with players and officials. The signal for warning is accompanied by a yellow card. A disqualification for the game is indicated by a red card, followed by a blue card if the disqualification will be accompanied by a report. The referees also use whistle blows to indicate infractions or to restart the play.

The referees are supported by a scorekeeper and a timekeeper who attend to formal things such as keeping track of goals and suspensions, or starting and stopping the clock, respectively. They also keep an eye on the benches and notify the referees on substitution errors. Their desk is located between the two substitution areas.

=== Team players, substitutes, and officials ===
Each team consists of up to 16 players: seven on court and up to nine substitutes on the bench (since 1 July 2025; previously up to 14 players). National federations may set lower limits. A team may have at most one designated goalkeeper on the court at any time, wearing a colour that clearly differs from the court players of both teams and from the other team's goalkeeper. A team may also play without a goalkeeper, in which case up to seven court players may be on the court. Substitution of players can be done in any number and at any time during game play. An exchange takes place over the substitution line. A prior notification of the referees is not necessary.

Some national bodies, such as the Deutsche Handball Bund (DHB, "German Handball Federation"), allow substitution in junior teams only when in ball possession or during timeouts. This restriction is intended to prevent early specialization of players to offence or defence.

==== Court players ====
Court players are allowed to touch the ball with any part of their bodies above and including the knee. As in several other team sports, a distinction is made between catching and dribbling. A player who is in possession of the ball may stand stationary for only three seconds, and may take only three steps. They must then either shoot, pass, or dribble the ball. Taking more than three steps at any time is considered travelling, and results in a turnover. A player may dribble as many times as they want (though, since passing is faster, it is the preferred method of attack), as long as during each dribble the hand contacts only the top of the ball. Therefore, carrying is completely prohibited, and results in a turnover. After the dribble is picked up, the player has the right to another three seconds or three steps. The ball must then be passed or shot, as further holding or dribbling will result in a double dribble turnover and a free throw for the other team. Other offensive infractions that result in a turnover include charging and setting an illegal screen. Carrying the ball into the six-metre zone results either in ball possession by the goalkeeper (by attacker) or turnover (by defender).

==== Goalkeeper ====
Only the goalkeepers are allowed to move freely within the goal perimeter, although they may not cross the goal perimeter line while carrying or dribbling the ball. Within the zone, they are allowed to touch the ball with all parts of their bodies, including their feet, with a defensive aim (for other actions, they are subject to the same restrictions as the court players). The goalkeepers may participate in the normal play of their teammates. A regular court player may substitute as an extra attacker for the goalkeeper if a team elects to use this scheme in order to outnumber the defending players. Prior to 2015, this court player became the designated goalkeeper on the court and had to wear some vest or bib the same color as the goalkeeper's shirt to be identified as such. A rule change meant to make the game more offensive now allows any player to substitute for the goalkeeper without becoming a designated goalkeeper. The new rule resembles the one used in ice hockey. This rule was first used in the women's world championship in December 2015 and has since been used by the men's European championship in January 2016 and by both genders in the Olympic tournament in 2016. This rule change has led to a drastic increase of empty net goals.

If either goalkeeper deflects the ball over the outer goal line, their team stays in possession of the ball, in contrast to other sports like football. The goalkeeper resumes the play with a throw from within the zone ("goalkeeper throw"). Since 1 July 2025, a seven-metre thrower who hits the head of a goalkeeper who did not move the head towards the ball receives a two-minute suspension (previously a red card). The same applies when a free throw taken after the final signal hits a defender's head. Hitting a non-moving goalkeeper's head out of regular play will lead to a two-minute suspension as long as the player threw without obstruction.

Outside of own D-zone, the goalkeeper is treated as an ordinary court player, and has to follow court players' rules; holding or tackling an opponent player outside the area risks a direct disqualification. The goalkeeper may not return to the area with the ball. Passing to one's own goalkeeper results in a turnover.

==== Team officials ====
Each team is allowed to have a maximum of five team officials seated on the benches (four until 30 June 2025). An official is anybody who is neither player nor substitute. One official must be the designated representative who is usually the team manager. Other officials typically include physicians or managers. No official is allowed to enter the playing court without the permission of the referees.

=== Ball ===
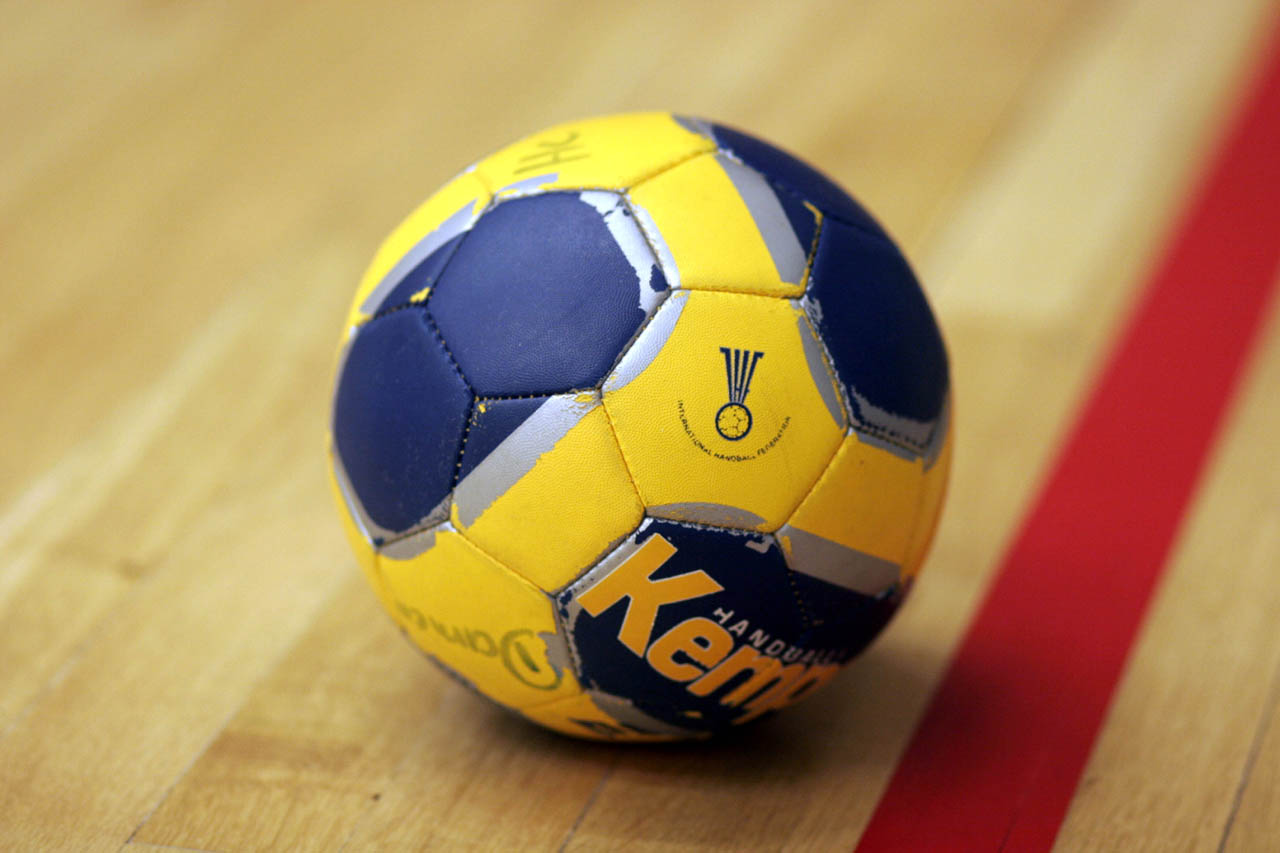
A size III handball

The ball is spherical and must be made either of leather or a synthetic material. It is not allowed to have a shiny or slippery surface. As the ball is intended to be operated by a single hand, its official sizes vary depending on age and gender of the participating teams.

Size	Class	Circumference (cm)	Circumference (in)	Weight (g)	Weight (oz)
III	Men over 16	58–60	23–24	425–475	15.0–16.8
II	Women over 14, men over 12	54–56	21–22	325–375	11.5–13.2
I	Junior over 8	50–52	20–20	290–330	10–12

=== Awarded throws ===
The referees may award a special throw to a team. This usually happens after certain events such as scored goals, off-court balls, turnovers and timeouts. All of these special throws require the thrower to obtain a certain position, and pose restrictions on the positions of all other players. Sometimes the execution must wait for a whistle blow by the referee.

Throw-off
A throw-off is taken either from the centre line (one foot touching the line, opponents at least three metres away) or from the throw-off area, a circle of 4 m diameter in the centre of the court, which is mandatory at IHF events and in professional leagues. When the throw-off area is used, the thrower and the ball must be completely inside the area when the referee whistles; the thrower may move within the area but may not bounce the ball, jump, or cross the line of the area before the throw is completed. Opponents must stay outside the area. The thrower's teammates may not cross the centre line before the whistle unless they are inside the throw-off area. The defending players must keep a distance of at least three metres from the thrower until the ball leaves his hand. A throw-off occurs at the beginning of each period and after the opposing team scores a goal. It must be cleared by the referees.

Throw-in
The team which did not touch the ball last is awarded a throw-in when the ball fully crosses the side line or touches the ceiling. If the ball crosses the outer goal line, a throw-in is awarded only if the defending court players touched the ball last. Execution requires the thrower to place one foot on the nearest outer line to the cause. All defending players must keep a distance of three metres (9.8 ft). They are allowed to stand immediately outside their own goal area even when the distance is less than three metres.

Goalkeeper-throw
If the ball crosses the outer goal line without interference from the defending team or when deflected by the defending team's goalkeeper, or when the attacking team violates the D-zone as described above, a goalkeeper-throw is awarded to the defending team. This is the most common turnover. The goalkeeper resumes the play with a throw from anywhere within the goal area.

Free-throw
A free-throw restarts the play after an interruption by the referees. It takes places from the spot where the interruption was caused, as long as this spot is outside of the free-throw line of the opposing team. In the latter case, the throw is deferred to the nearest spot on the free-throw line. Free-throws are the equivalent to free-kicks in association football; conceding them is typically not seen as poor sportsmanship for the defending side, and in itself, they carry no major disadvantages. (In particular, being awarded a free throw while being on warning for passive play will not reset the warning, whereas a shot on goal will.) The thrower may take a direct attempt for a goal, which is rarely feasible if the defending team has organised a defence. If a free throw is awarded and the half or game ends, a direct throw at the goal is typically attempted, which occasionally goes in.

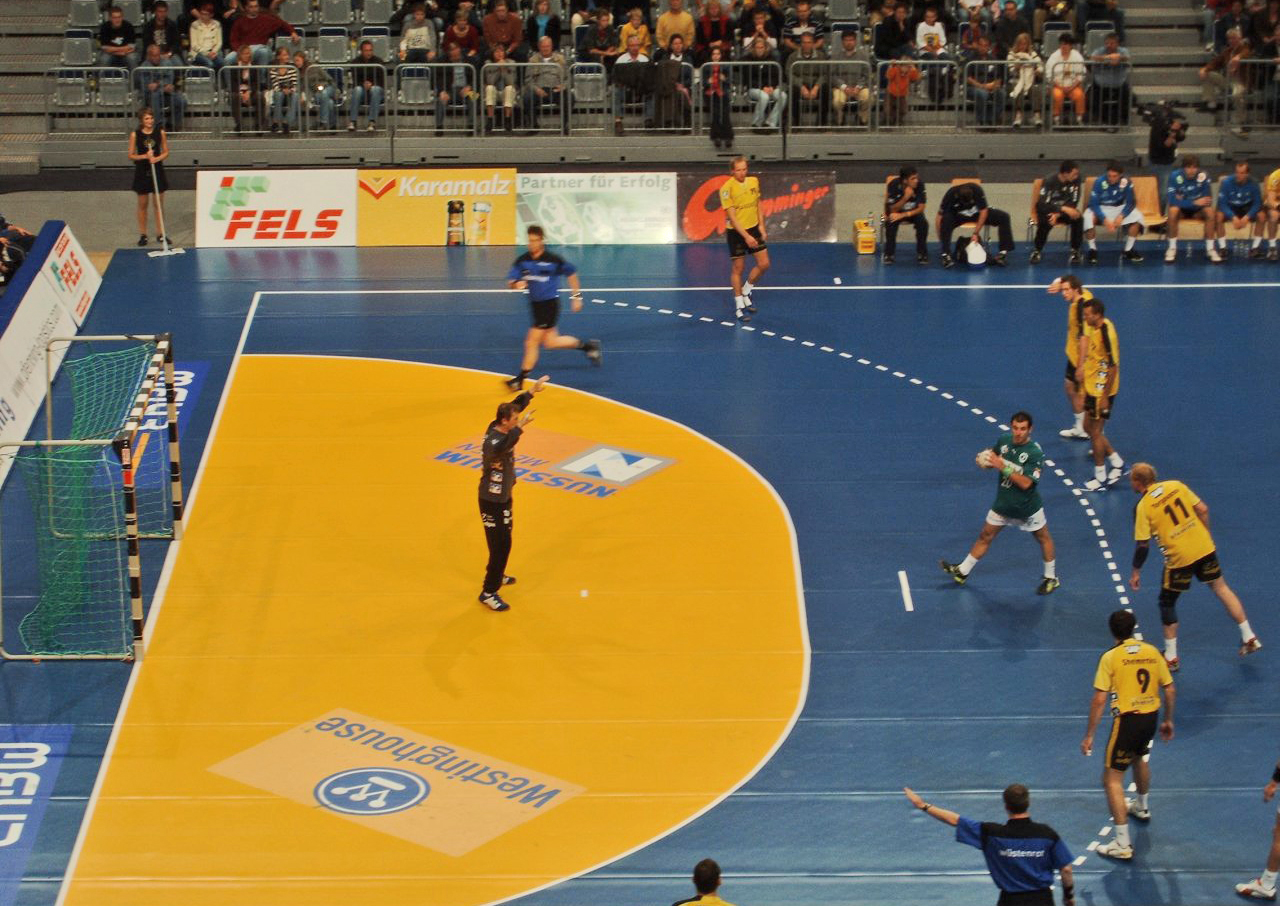
A seven-metre throw

Seven-metre throw
A seven-metre throw is awarded when a clear chance of scoring is illegally prevented anywhere on the court by an opposing team player, official, or spectator. It is awarded also when the referees have interrupted a legitimate scoring chance for any reason. The thrower steps with one foot behind the seven-metre line with only the defending goalkeeper between him and the goal. The goalkeeper must keep a distance of three metres away, which is marked by a short tick on the floor. All other players must remain behind the free-throw line until execution and the defending court players must keep a distance of three metres. The thrower must await the whistle blow of the referee. A seven-metre throw is the equivalent to a penalty kick in association football; it is far more common and typically occurs several times in a single game. It is thus tactically similar to the free throw in basketball and teams will try to have their best seven metre throwers execute those throws.

=== Penalties ===
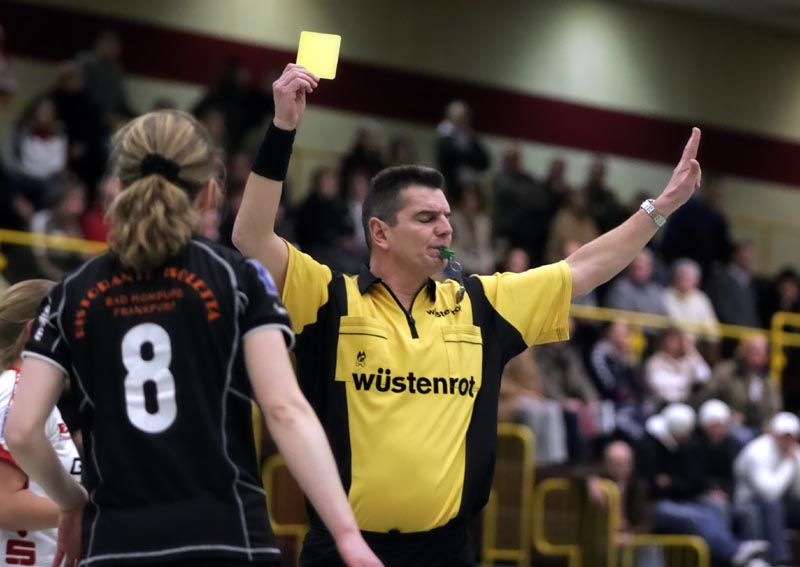
Yellow card shown in a handball match

Penalties are given to players, in progressive format, for fouls that require more punishment than just a free-throw. Actions directed mainly at the opponent and not the ball (such as reaching around, holding, pushing, tripping, and jumping into opponent) as well as contact from the side, from behind a player or impeding the opponent's counterattack are all considered illegal and are subject to penalty. Any infraction that prevents a clear scoring opportunity will result in a seven-metre penalty shot.

Typically the referee will give a warning (yellow card) for an illegal action. Certain infringements, such as those against the opponent's head, neck or throat, must be punished with an immediate two-minute suspension regardless of earlier warnings; particularly aggressive actions against these areas can lead to disqualification (red card). A player should receive no more than one yellow card and a team no more than three in total. A player's third two-minute suspension automatically results in disqualification.

A red card results in an ejection from the game and a two-minute penalty for the team. A player may receive a red card directly for particularly rough penalties. Disqualification is given for actions that endanger the opponent's health, for example when the opponent loses body control while running, jumping or throwing, or when an unprepared opponent cannot protect themselves; the referees consider the position of the offender (including from behind), the body part targeted and the intensity of the action. Particularly reckless, dangerous, premeditated or malicious actions additionally lead to a written report (indicated by showing a blue card after the red card). A red-carded player has to leave the playing area completely. A player who is disqualified may be substituted with another player after the two-minute penalty is served. A coach or official can also be penalized progressively. Any coach or official who receives a two-minute suspension will have to pull out one of their players for two minutes. The player is not the one punished, and can be substituted in again, as the penalty consists of the team playing with one fewer player than the opposing team.

After referees award the ball to the opponents for whatever reason, the player currently in possession of the ball has to lay it down quickly, or risk a two-minute suspension. Also, gesticulating or verbally questioning the referee's order, as well as arguing with the officials' decisions, will normally risk a yellow card. If a player who has just been suspended behaves unsportingly before play resumes, they receive an additional two-minute suspension, so the team is reduced for four minutes. A faulty substitution is punished with a two-minute suspension for the offending player.

== Gameplay ==
=== Formations ===
Positions of attacking (red) and defending players (blue), in a 5–1 defence formation

Positions of attacking (red) and defending players (blue), in a 6–0 defence formation

Players are typically referred to by the positions they are playing. The positions are always denoted from the view of the respective goalkeeper, so that a defender on the right opposes an attacker on the left. Not all of the following positions may be occupied depending on the formation or potential suspensions.

==== Offence ====
- Left and right wingman. These typically are fast players who excel at ball control and wide jumps from the outside of the goal perimeter in order to get into a better shooting angle at the goal. Teams usually try to occupy the left position with a right-handed player and vice versa.
- Left and right backcourt. Goal attempts by these players are typically made by jumping high and shooting over the defenders. Thus, it is usually advantageous to have tall players with a powerful shot for these positions.
- Centre backcourt. A player with experience is preferred on this position who acts as playmaker and the handball equivalent of a basketball point guard.
- Pivot (left and right, if applicable), also commonly called "line player". This player tends to intermingle with the defence, setting picks and attempting to disrupt the defence's formation. This position requires the least jumping skills; but ball control and physical strength are advantages.

Sometimes, the offence uses formations with two pivot players. Formations with no pivots and 4 backs are rare, but not unheard of.

==== Defence ====
There are many variations in defensive formations. Usually, they are described as n:m formations, where n is the number of players defending at the goal line and m the number of players defending more offensive. Exceptions are the 3:2:1 defence and n+m formation (e.g. 5+1), where m players defend some offensive player in man coverage (instead of the usual zone coverage).

- Far left and far right. The opponents of the wingmen.
- Half left and half right. The opponents of the left and right backcourts.
- Back centre (left and right). Opponent of the pivot.
- Front centre. Opponent of the centre backcourt, may also be set against another specific backcourt player.

==== Late match defence ====
In close matches with less than a minute left, where the defence is behind, the defence can go into a field press, where the defensive line starts wherever the offence has the ball. This is a committal choice that leads to an opportunity for the offence. It can even happen that the defending team chooses to let the offence have an opportunity and hope that the goalkeeper saves it, to spend as little time as possible

=== Offensive play ===
Attacks are played with all court players on the side of the defenders. Depending on the speed of the attack, one distinguishes between three attack waves with a decreasing chance of success:

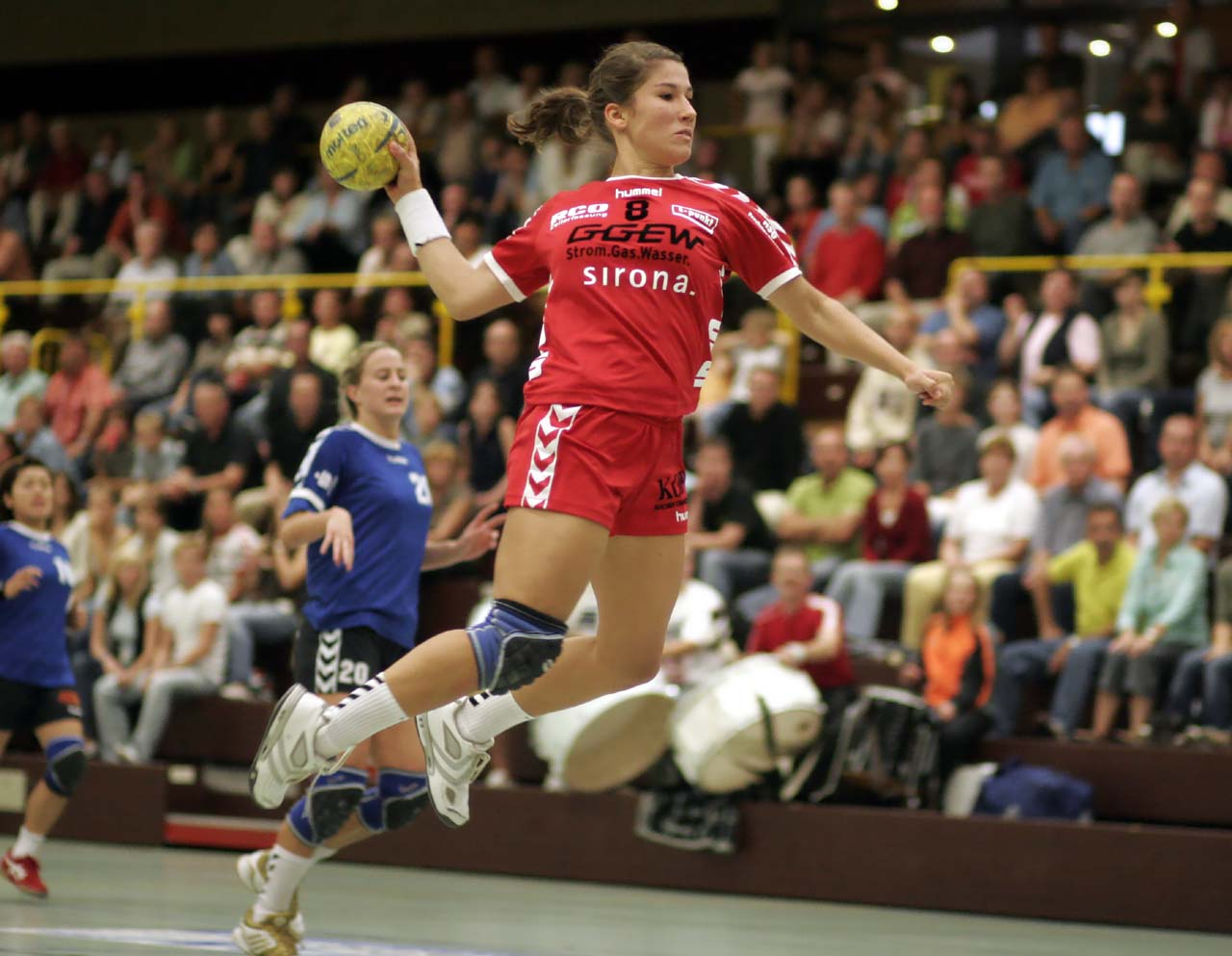
Women's handball – a jump shot completes a fast-break.

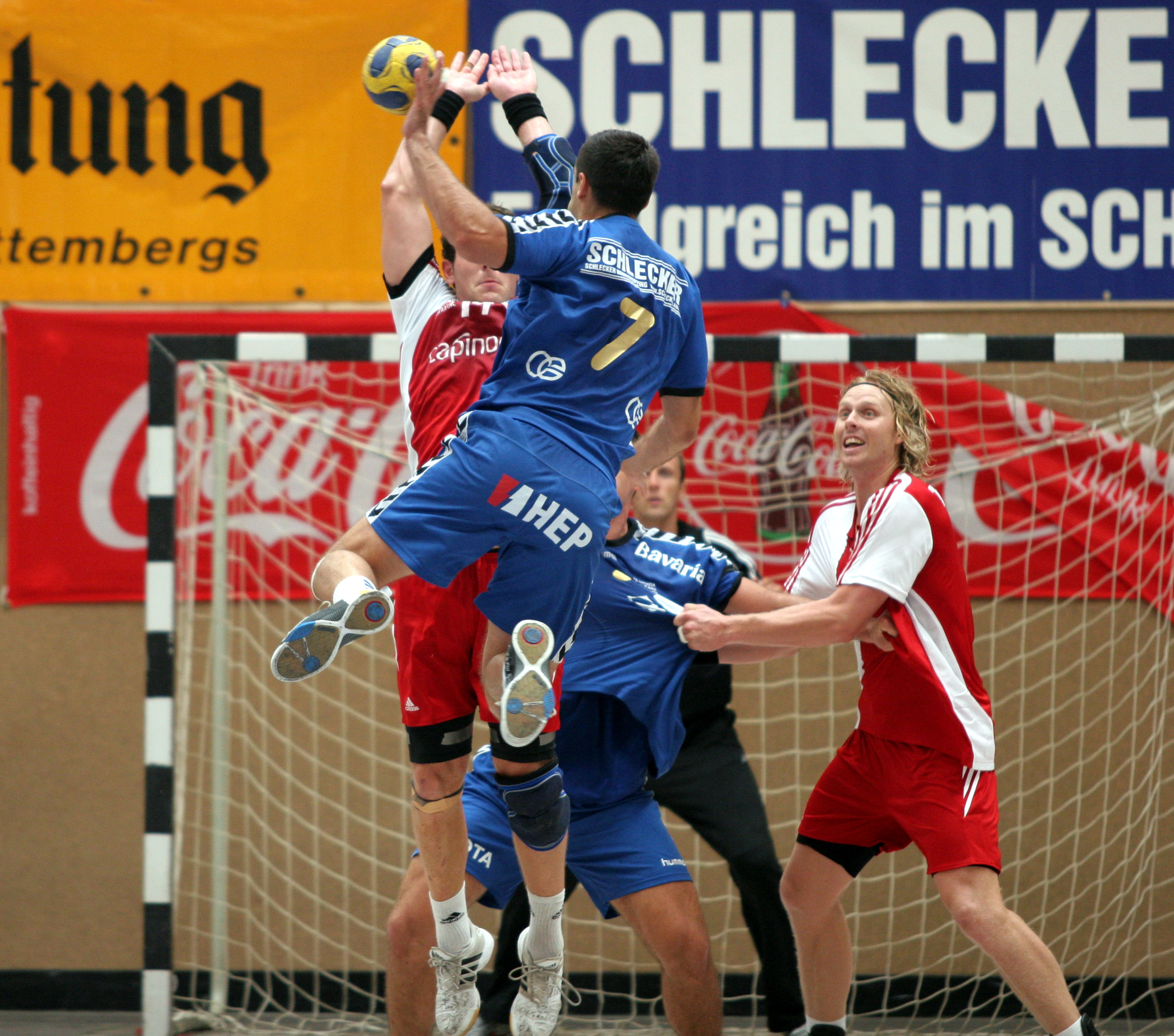
Men's handball – a jump shot (Kiril Lazarov, world record-holder for the number of goals scored in one world championship)

First wave
First wave attacks are characterised by the absence of defending players around their goal perimeter. The chance of success is very high, as the throwing player is unhindered in his scoring attempt. Such attacks typically occur after an intercepted pass or a steal, and if the defending team can switch fast to offence. The far left or far right will usually try to run the attack, as they are not as tightly bound in the defence. On a turnover, they immediately sprint forward and receive the ball halfway to the other goal. Thus, these positions are commonly held by quick players.

Second wave
If the first wave is not successful and some defending players have gained their positions around the zone, the second wave comes into play: the remaining players advance with quick passes to locally outnumber the retreating defenders. If one player manages to step up to the perimeter or catches the ball at this spot, he becomes unstoppable by legal defensive means. From this position, the chance of success is naturally very high. Second wave attacks became much more important with the "fast throw-off" rule.

Third wave
The time during which the second wave may be successful is very short, as then the defenders closed the gaps around the zone. In the third wave, the attackers use standardised attack patterns usually involving crossing and passing between the back court players who either try to pass the ball through a gap to their pivot, take a jumping shot from the backcourt at the goal, or lure the defence away from a wingman.

The third wave evolves into the normal offensive play when all defenders not only reach the zone, but gain their accustomed positions. Some teams then substitute specialised offence players. This implies that these players must play in the defence should the opposing team be able to switch quickly to offence. The latter is another benefit for fast playing teams.

If the attacking team does not make sufficient progress (eventually releasing a shot on goal), the referees can call passive play (since 1995, the referee gives an advance warning by holding one hand high, signalling that the attacking team should release a shot soon), turning control over to the other team. The warning is cancelled, and the attacking team is given a new build-up phase, if a shot rebounds from the goal or the goalkeeper directly back to the attacking team (or results in a throw-in or goalkeeper throw for them), or if a player or official of the defending team receives a personal punishment (warning, suspension or disqualification). A shot blocked by the defence or a free throw does not cancel the warning. This rule prevents an attacking team from stalling the game indefinitely, as it is difficult to intercept a pass without at the same time conceding dangerous openings towards the goal.

=== Defensive play ===
The usual formations of the defence are 6–0, when all the defence players line up between the 6-metre (20 ft) and 9-metre (30 ft) lines to form a wall; the 5–1, when one of the players cruises outside the 9-metre (30 ft) perimeter, usually targeting the centre forwards while the other 5 line up on the 6-metre (20 ft) line; and the less common 4–2 when there are two such defenders out front. Very fast teams will also try a 3–3 formation which is close to a switching man-to-man style. The formations vary greatly from country to country, and reflect each country's style of play. 6–0 is sometimes known as "flat defence", and all other formations are usually called "offensive defence".

Due to the passive play rules, it is often enough for the defence to simply prevent chances rather than actively winning possession.

== Organization ==
Handball teams are usually organised as clubs. On a national level, the clubs are associated in federations which organize matches in leagues and tournaments.

=== International body ===
The International Handball Federation (IHF) is the administrative and controlling body for international handball. Handball is an Olympic sport played during the Summer Olympics.

The IHF organizes world championships, held in odd-numbered years, with separate competitions for men and women. The IHF World Men's Handball Championship 2025 title holders are Denmark. The IHF World Women's Handball Championship 2025 title holder is Norway.

The IHF is composed of six continental federations: the Asian Handball Federation, the African Handball Confederation, the European Handball Federation, the North America and Caribbean Handball Confederation, the Oceania Continent Handball Federation and the South and Central America Handball Confederation. The latter two American confederations replaced the Pan-American Team Handball Federation, which was dissolved in 2018. These federations organize continental championships held every second year. Handball is played during the Pan American Games, All-Africa Games, and Asian Games. It is also played at the Mediterranean Games. In addition to continental competitions between national teams, the federations arrange international tournaments between club teams.

=== International competitions ===
- Nor.Ca. Handball Championship (men, women)

=== National competitions ===
==== Europe ====
- Austria: Handball Liga Austria
- Belgium: BENE-League Handball (shared competition with the Netherlands)
- Bosnia and Herzegovina: Handball Championship of Bosnia and Herzegovina
- Croatia: Croatian First League of Handball
- Czech Republic: Czech Handball Extraliga
- Denmark: Damehåndboldligaen (women), Jack & Jones Ligaen (men)
- England: England Handball Association
- Finland: Finnish Handball League
- France: Liqui Moly Starligue (men), Ligue Butagaz Énergie (women)
- Germany: Handball-Bundesliga, Handball-Bundesliga (women)
- Greece: Greek Men's handball championship
- Hungary: Nemzeti Bajnokság I (men), Nemzeti Bajnokság I (women)
- Iceland: Olís deildin
- Israel: Ligat Winner
- Italy: Serie A (men), Serie A1 (women)
- Montenegro: First League (men), First League (women), Second League (men), Second League (women)
- Netherlands: BENE-League Handball (shared competition with Belgium), Eredivisie (women)
- North Macedonia: Macedonian Handball Super League
- Norway: Eliteserien (men's handball), Eliteserien (women's handball)
- Poland: Polish Superliga (men's handball), Ekstraklasa (women's handball)
- Portugal: Andebol 1 (men), 1ª Divisão Feminino (women)
- Romania: Liga Națională (men), Liga Naţională (women)
- Russia: Men's Championship, Women's Championship, Women's Handball Cup, Men's Handball Cup, Women's Handball Super Cup, Men's Handball Super Cup
- Scotland: Scottish Handball League
- Serbia: Serbian First League of Handball
- Slovakia: Slovenská hadzanárska extraliga
- Slovenia: Slovenian First League of Handball, Handball Cup of Slovenia
- Spain: Liga ASOBAL, División de Plata de Balonmano
- Sweden: Handbollsligan (men), Svensk handbollselit (women)
- Turkey: Handball Super League (men), Women's Handball Super League (women)

==== Other ====
- Angola: Angola Men's Handball League (men), Angola Women's Handball League (women)
- Argentina: Confederación Argentina de Handball
- Australia: Australian Handball Club Championship, Handball League Australia, Australian National Handball Championship (States)
- Egypt: Egyptian Handball League
- Japan: Japan Handball League
- Korea: Handball Korea League
- Tahiti: Tahitian Handball League
- United States: USA Team Handball Nationals, USA Team Handball College Nationals

== Attendance records ==
The worldwide attendance record for seven-a-side handball was set on 10 January 2024 in Düsseldorf, Germany, during the two opening matches of the 2024 European Men's Handball Championship. The two games (France versus North Macedonia and Germany against Switzerland) were played in front of 53,586 spectators.

== Commemorative coins ==
Handball events have been selected as a main motif in numerous collectors' coins. One of the recent samples is the €10 Greek Handball commemorative coin, minted in 2003 to commemorate the 2004 Summer Olympics. On the coin, the modern athlete directs the ball in his hands towards his target, while in the background the ancient athlete is just about to throw a ball, in a game known as cheirosphaira, in a representation taken from a black-figure pottery vase of the Archaic period.

The most recent commemorative coin featuring handball is the British 50 pence coin, part of the series of coins commemorating the London 2012 Olympic Games.

== See also ==
- Beach handball
- Czech handball
- Field handball
- Handball at the Summer Olympics
- Handball in the United States
- Water polo, a similar sport played in water
- Wheelchair handball
