= RK Lovćen in SEHA League =

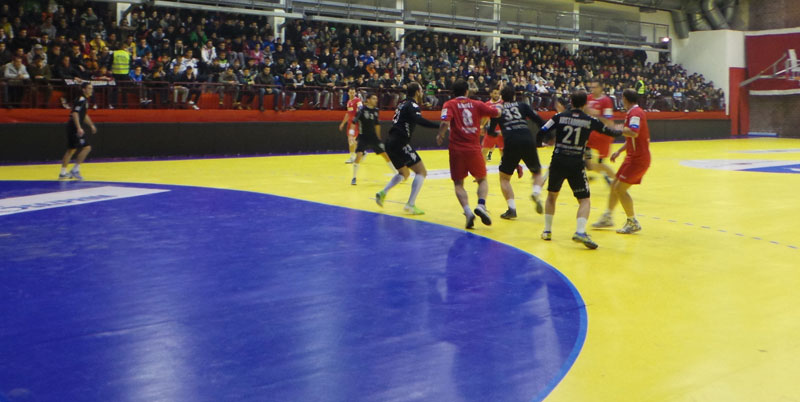
RK Lovćen - RK Partizan, SEHA League 2013

RK Lovćen Cetinje is a permanent member of the Regional SEHA League since its establishing.

In their first SEHA League season, Lovćen made surprising result, with final placement on 6th position. Year after that, Lovćen finished season on the same table position.

In the season 2013/14, because of new SEHA League criteria, SRC Lovćen hall was reconstructed, with changing capacity from 1,500 to 2,020.

== Records ==
- Largest victory: 18:28, (Bosnia and Herzegovina) Bosna Sarajevo – (Montenegro) Lovćen Cetinje, 5 March 2012, Sarajevo
- Largest defeat: 36:19, (Montenegro) Lovćen Cetinje – (North Macedonia) Vardar Skopje 23:41, 6 March 2014, Cetinje
- Largest home victory: 31:22, (Montenegro) Lovćen Cetinje – (Montenegro) Sutjeska Nikšić, 10 March 2012, Cetinje
- Largest defeat away: 35:19, (North Macedonia) Vardar Skopje - (Montenegro) Lovćen Cetinje, 16 October 2013, Skopje
- Longest unbeaten streak: 5 matches, (5 March 2012 − 15 September 2012), (13 November 2012 − 19 February 2013)
- Longest losing streak: 7 matches, (3 December 2013 − 14 March 2014)
- Most scored goals in a match: 34, (Montenegro) Lovćen Cetinje – (Croatia) Co Zagreb 34:35, 8 November 2013, Cetinje
- Most goals against in a match: 41, (Montenegro) Lovćen Cetinje – (North Macedonia) Tatran Prešov 23:41, 6 March 2014, Cetinje
- Player with most scored goals in a match: 14, Igor Marković, (Bosnia and Herzegovina) Izviđač Ljubuški – (Montenegro) Lovćen Cetinje 31:27, 15 September 2012, Ljubuški
- Highest home attendance: 1,800, (Montenegro) Lovćen Cetinje – (Serbia) Partizan Belgrade 31:28, 29 November 2013, Cetinje
- Highest away attendance: 2,000, (Serbia) Metaloplastika Šabac – (Montenegro) Lovćen Cetinje 21:25, 20 March 2012, Šabac

== Opponents ==
During their participation in the SEHA League, Lovćen played against 15 different opponents from Bosnia and Herzegovina, Belarus, Croatia, Macedonia, Montenegro, Serbia and Slovakia.

Below is the list of opponents and results of matches which Lovćen played against every single team in the SEHA League.

Opponent	2011/12		2012/13		2013/14	
(Bosnia and Herzegovina) Borac Banja Luka	31:30	24:25	31:27	28:28	27:23	33:26
(Bosnia and Herzegovina) Bosna Sarajevo	29:25	28:18				
(Serbia) Crvena zvezda Belgrade	26:20					
(Bosnia and Herzegovina) Izviđač Ljubuški	27:19	30:26	24:22	27:31		
(Belarus) Meshkov Brest			29:29	30:33	24:30	28:34
(Serbia) Metaloplastika Šabac	28:20	25:21				
(North Macedonia) Metalurg Skopje	20:21	17:32	22:24	19:32	23:29	19:19
(Croatia) Nexe Našice	24:22	21:32	28:27	30:29	24:33	26:26
(Serbia) Partizan Belgrade					31:28	23:26
(Bosnia and Herzegovina) Sloga Doboj			33:30	33:29		
(Montenegro) Sutjeska Nikšić	31:22	26:20				
(Slovakia) Tatran Prešov	25:37	31:34	30:29	29:36	22:39	29:32
(North Macedonia) Vardar Skopje	24:29	29:34	23:21	29:38	23:41	19:36
(Serbia) Vojvodina Novi Sad					25:28	23:30
(Croatia) CO Zagreb	27:25	24:38	30:28	22:30	34:35	27:38

In every season, on the first column is the result of the home match

== SEHA League 2011-12 ==
=== Team and results ===
During the season 2011/12, in the Lovćen player roster for SEHA League were Abramović, Borilović, Drašković, Grbović, Jovetić, Kaluđerović, Lasica, Latković, Lipovina, I. Marković, N. Marković, Pejović, Perišić, F. Popović, M. Popović, Radović, Simić, Stanković. Coach: Pero Milošević (September - end of the season)

In the season 2011/12, Lovćen played 21 games. First season of the regional competition, Lovćen finished with 36 points - 12 wins and 9 losses. During the season, Lovćen made a few great results, like wins against Zagreb (27:25), Bosna Sarajevo (29:25, 28:18), Crvena zvezda Belgrade (26:20) etc.

10 September 2011	Lovćen Cetinje (Montenegro)	25 – 37	(Slovakia) Tatran Prešov	SRC Lovćen, Cetinje; Attendance: 1,500; Referees: A. Konjičanin, D. Konjičanin (BIH)
10 September 2011	Grbović, Drašković, Perišić 5	(16–17)	Antl 10	SRC Lovćen, Cetinje; Attendance: 1,500; Referees: A. Konjičanin, D. Konjičanin (BIH)
10 September 2011	3× (suspension)		5× (suspension)	SRC Lovćen, Cetinje; Attendance: 1,500; Referees: A. Konjičanin, D. Konjičanin (BIH)

17 September 2011	Lovćen Cetinje (Montenegro)	31 – 30	(Bosnia and Herzegovina) Borac Banja Luka	SRC Lovćen, Cetinje; Attendance: 1,000; Referees: Načevski, Volkov (MKD)
17 September 2011	Marković 10	(17–14)	Stojanović 8	SRC Lovćen, Cetinje; Attendance: 1,000; Referees: Načevski, Volkov (MKD)
17 September 2011	3× (suspension)		4× (suspension)	SRC Lovćen, Cetinje; Attendance: 1,000; Referees: Načevski, Volkov (MKD)

24 September 2011	Lovćen Cetinje (Montenegro)	24 – 29	(North Macedonia) Vardar Skopje	SRC Lovćen, Cetinje; Attendance: 1,500; Referees: Nikolić, Stojković (SER)
24 September 2011	Drašković 6	(13–12)	Sobol 7	SRC Lovćen, Cetinje; Attendance: 1,500; Referees: Nikolić, Stojković (SER)
24 September 2011	1× (suspension)		1× (suspension)	SRC Lovćen, Cetinje; Attendance: 1,500; Referees: Nikolić, Stojković (SER)

05 October 2011	Lovćen Cetinje (Montenegro)	26 – 20	(Serbia) Crvena zvezda Belgrade	SRC Lovćen, Cetinje; Attendance: 1,200; Referees: Knezović, Zovko (BIH)
05 October 2011	Grbović 10	(13–8)	Nadoveza 4	SRC Lovćen, Cetinje; Attendance: 1,200; Referees: Knezović, Zovko (BIH)
05 October 2011	4× (suspension)		3× (suspension)	SRC Lovćen, Cetinje; Attendance: 1,200; Referees: Knezović, Zovko (BIH)

15 October 2011	CO Zagreb (Croatia)	38 – 24	(Montenegro) Lovćen Cetinje	Trešnjevka Hall, Zagreb; Attendance: 300; Referees: A. Konjičanin, D. Konjičanin (BIH)
15 October 2011	Horvat, Šprem 6	(20–11)	Marković 7	Trešnjevka Hall, Zagreb; Attendance: 300; Referees: A. Konjičanin, D. Konjičanin (BIH)
15 October 2011	2× (suspension)		2× (suspension)	Trešnjevka Hall, Zagreb; Attendance: 300; Referees: A. Konjičanin, D. Konjičanin (BIH)

18 October 2011	Lovćen Cetinje (Montenegro)	27 – 19	(Bosnia and Herzegovina) Izviđač Ljubuški	SRC Lovćen, Cetinje; Attendance: 600; Referees: Kolevski, Krkacev (MKD)
18 October 2011	Marković, Grbović 5	(17–8)	Malinović 4	SRC Lovćen, Cetinje; Attendance: 600; Referees: Kolevski, Krkacev (MKD)
18 October 2011	7× (suspension)		1× (suspension)	SRC Lovćen, Cetinje; Attendance: 600; Referees: Kolevski, Krkacev (MKD)

20 October 2011	Lovćen Cetinje (Montenegro)	28 – 20	(Serbia) Metaloplastika Šabac	SRC Lovćen, Cetinje; Attendance: 1,000; Referees: Knezović, Zovko (BIH)
20 October 2011	Grbović 8	(14–12)	Medurić 6	SRC Lovćen, Cetinje; Attendance: 1,000; Referees: Knezović, Zovko (BIH)
20 October 2011	0× (suspension)		2× (suspension)	SRC Lovćen, Cetinje; Attendance: 1,000; Referees: Knezović, Zovko (BIH)

24 October 2011	Metalurg Skopje (North Macedonia)	32 – 17	(Montenegro) Lovćen Cetinje	Avtokomanda, Skopje; Attendance: 500; Referees: Boričić, Marković (SER)
24 October 2011	Manaskov 5	(18–8)	Marković 4	Avtokomanda, Skopje; Attendance: 500; Referees: Boričić, Marković (SER)
24 October 2011	3× (suspension)		1× (suspension)	Avtokomanda, Skopje; Attendance: 500; Referees: Boričić, Marković (SER)

29 October 2011	Lovćen Cetinje (Montenegro)	29 – 25	(Bosnia and Herzegovina) Bosna Sarajevo	SRC Lovćen, Cetinje; Attendance: 700; Referees: Mitrevski, Todorovski (MKD)
29 October 2011	Marković 6	(14–10)	Čakić 7	SRC Lovćen, Cetinje; Attendance: 700; Referees: Mitrevski, Todorovski (MKD)
29 October 2011	2× (suspension)		3× (suspension)	SRC Lovćen, Cetinje; Attendance: 700; Referees: Mitrevski, Todorovski (MKD)

12 November 2011	Sutjeska Nikšić (Montenegro)	20 – 26	(Montenegro) Lovćen Cetinje	SC Nikšić, Nikšić; Attendance: 800; Referees: Kolevski, Krkačev (MKD)
12 November 2011	Đođić 9	(10–14)	Jovetić 8	SC Nikšić, Nikšić; Attendance: 800; Referees: Kolevski, Krkačev (MKD)
12 November 2011	6× (suspension)		5× (suspension)	SC Nikšić, Nikšić; Attendance: 800; Referees: Kolevski, Krkačev (MKD)

23 November 2011	Nexe Našice (Croatia)	32 – 21	(Montenegro) Lovćen Cetinje	Kralj Tomislav Hall, Našice; Attendance: 400; Referees: Boričić, Marković (SER)
23 November 2011	Lelić 9	(14–10)	Latković 6	Kralj Tomislav Hall, Našice; Attendance: 400; Referees: Boričić, Marković (SER)
23 November 2011	6× (suspension)		7× (suspension)	Kralj Tomislav Hall, Našice; Attendance: 400; Referees: Boričić, Marković (SER)

06 December 2011	Tatran Prešov (Slovakia)	34 – 31	(Montenegro) Lovćen Cetinje	City Hall Prešov, Prešov; Attendance: 1,700; Referees: Boričić, Marković (SER)
06 December 2011	Antl 11	(17–17)	Drašković 6	City Hall Prešov, Prešov; Attendance: 1,700; Referees: Boričić, Marković (SER)
06 December 2011	8× (suspension) 1× (red card)		6× (suspension)	City Hall Prešov, Prešov; Attendance: 1,700; Referees: Boričić, Marković (SER)

12 December 2011	Vardar Skopje (North Macedonia)	34 – 29	(Montenegro) Lovćen Cetinje	SRC Kale, Skopje; Attendance: 200; Referees: A. Konjičanin, D. Konjičanin (BIH)
12 December 2011	Lazarov 11	(17-16)	Grbović 6	SRC Kale, Skopje; Attendance: 200; Referees: A. Konjičanin, D. Konjičanin (BIH)
12 December 2011	2× (suspension) 1× (red card)		3× (suspension)	SRC Kale, Skopje; Attendance: 200; Referees: A. Konjičanin, D. Konjičanin (BIH)

02 February 2012	Borac Banja Luka (Bosnia and Herzegovina)	25 – 24	(Montenegro) Lovćen Cetinje	Borik Sports Hall, Banja Luka; Attendance: 1,000; Referees: Nikolov, Načevski (MKD)
02 February 2012	Panić 7	(7–11)	Marković 6	Borik Sports Hall, Banja Luka; Attendance: 1,000; Referees: Nikolov, Načevski (MKD)
02 February 2012	3× (suspension)		4× (suspension)	Borik Sports Hall, Banja Luka; Attendance: 1,000; Referees: Nikolov, Načevski (MKD)

18 February 2012	Izviđač Ljubuški (Bosnia and Herzegovina)	26 – 30	(Montenegro) Lovćen Cetinje	Gradska dvorana, Ljubuški, Ljubuški; Attendance: 500; Referees: Mitrevski, Todorovski (MKD)
18 February 2012	Malinović 6	(14–19)	Drašković 8	Gradska dvorana, Ljubuški, Ljubuški; Attendance: 500; Referees: Mitrevski, Todorovski (MKD)
18 February 2012	2× (suspension)		5× (suspension)	Gradska dvorana, Ljubuški, Ljubuški; Attendance: 500; Referees: Mitrevski, Todorovski (MKD)

29 February 2012	Lovćen Cetinje (Montenegro)	20 – 21	(North Macedonia) Metalurg Skopje	SRC Lovćen, Cetinje; Attendance: 1,000; Referees: Gubica, Milošević (CRO)
29 February 2012	Drašković 6	(11–9)	Marković 4	SRC Lovćen, Cetinje; Attendance: 1,000; Referees: Gubica, Milošević (CRO)
29 February 2012	5× (suspension)		2× (suspension)	SRC Lovćen, Cetinje; Attendance: 1,000; Referees: Gubica, Milošević (CRO)

05 March 2012	Bosna Sarajevo (Bosnia and Herzegovina)	18 – 28	(Montenegro) Lovćen Cetinje	Ramiz Salčin Hall, Sarajevo; Attendance: 300; Referees: Jurinović, Mrvica (CRO)
05 March 2012	Hrbat 6	(11–17)	Marković 5	Ramiz Salčin Hall, Sarajevo; Attendance: 300; Referees: Jurinović, Mrvica (CRO)
05 March 2012	3× (suspension)		3× (suspension)	Ramiz Salčin Hall, Sarajevo; Attendance: 300; Referees: Jurinović, Mrvica (CRO)

10 March 2012	Lovćen Cetinje (Montenegro)	31 – 22	(Montenegro) Sutjeska Nikšić	SRC Lovćen, Cetinje; Attendance: 600; Referees: A. Konjičanin, D. Konjičanin (BIH)
10 March 2012	Marković 6	(19–5)	Nikitović 6	SRC Lovćen, Cetinje; Attendance: 600; Referees: A. Konjičanin, D. Konjičanin (BIH)
10 March 2012	2× (suspension)		4× (suspension)	SRC Lovćen, Cetinje; Attendance: 600; Referees: A. Konjičanin, D. Konjičanin (BIH)

20 March 2012	Metaloplastika Šabac (Serbia)	21 – 25	(Montenegro) Lovćen Cetinje	Zorka Hall, Šabac; Attendance: 2,000; Referees: Krkačev, Kolevski (MKD)
20 March 2012	Mitrović 5	(9–16)	Marković 7	Zorka Hall, Šabac; Attendance: 2,000; Referees: Krkačev, Kolevski (MKD)
20 March 2012	6× (suspension)		6× (suspension)	Zorka Hall, Šabac; Attendance: 2,000; Referees: Krkačev, Kolevski (MKD)

24 March 2012	Lovćen Cetinje (Montenegro)	24 – 22	(Croatia) Nexe Našice	SRC Lovćen, Cetinje; Attendance: 800; Referees: Mitrevski, Todorovski (MKD)
24 March 2012	Grbović 5	(10–13)	Markotić 5	SRC Lovćen, Cetinje; Attendance: 800; Referees: Mitrevski, Todorovski (MKD)
24 March 2012	6× (suspension) 1× (red card)		3× (suspension)	SRC Lovćen, Cetinje; Attendance: 800; Referees: Mitrevski, Todorovski (MKD)

28 March 2012	Lovćen Cetinje (Montenegro)	27 – 25	(Croatia) CO Zagreb	SRC Lovćen, Cetinje; Attendance: 1,500; Referees: Mitrevski, Todorovski (MKD)
28 March 2012	Perišić 9	(15–14)	Horvat 13	SRC Lovćen, Cetinje; Attendance: 1,500; Referees: Mitrevski, Todorovski (MKD)
28 March 2012	3× (suspension)		4× (suspension)	SRC Lovćen, Cetinje; Attendance: 1,500; Referees: Mitrevski, Todorovski (MKD)

=== Table ===
In the season 2011/12, Lovćen finished championship at the sixth place of table.

	Team	Pld	W	D	L	GF	GA	Diff	Pts
1	(Croatia) CO Zagreb	21	17	2	2	688	542	+146	53
2	(Slovakia) Tatran Prešov	21	16	1	4	685	577	+108	49
3	(North Macedonia) Vardar Skopje	20	15	2	3	559	507	+52	47
4	(North Macedonia) Metalurg Skopje	19	14	3	2	514	400	+114	45
5	(Croatia) Nexe Našice	22	12	3	7	628	569	+59	39
6	(Montenegro) Lovćen Cetinje	21	12	0	9	547	552	–5	36
7	(Bosnia and Herzegovina) Borac Banja Luka	22	11	2	9	620	576	+44	35
8	(Serbia) Metaloplastika Šabac	20	5	2	13	483	525	–42	17
9	(Bosnia and Herzegovina) Izviđač Ljubuški	20	3	1	16	504	579	–75	10
10	(Montenegro) Sutjeska Nikšić	21	3	1	17	474	594	–120	10
11	(Bosnia and Herzegovina) Bosna Sarajevo	17	3	1	13	377	527	–150	10
12	(Serbia) Crvena zvezda Belgrade	18	1	0	17	435	566	–131	3

== SEHA League 2012-13 ==
=== Team and results ===
During the season 2012/13, in the Lovćen player roster for SEHA League were Abramović, Daskalovski, Drašković, Grbović, Jovetić, Lasica, Lipovina, Marković, Nikolić, Pejović, Perišić, Popović, I. Radović, M. Radović, G. Vujović, L. Vujović and S. Vujović. Coach: Pero Milošević (September - November 2012), Zoran Abramović (November 2012 - end of the season)

In the season 2012/13, Lovćen played 18 games. Second season of the regional competition, Lovćen finished with 9 wins, 2 draws and 7 losses, or 29 points. During the season, Lovćen made a few surprisingly results, like wins against Zagreb (30:28), Tatran Prešov (30:29), Vardar Skopje (23:21), a draw against Meshkov Brest (29:29) etc.

15 September 2012	Izviđač Ljubuški (Bosnia and Herzegovina)	31 – 27	(Montenegro) Lovćen Cetinje	Gradska dvorana, Ljubuški, Ljubuški; Attendance: 800; Referees: Jurinović, Mrvica (CRO)
15 September 2012	Zeljić 9	(14–12)	Marković 14	Gradska dvorana, Ljubuški, Ljubuški; Attendance: 800; Referees: Jurinović, Mrvica (CRO)
15 September 2012	4× (suspension)		4× (suspension)	Gradska dvorana, Ljubuški, Ljubuški; Attendance: 800; Referees: Jurinović, Mrvica (CRO)

22 September 2012	Lovćen Cetinje (Montenegro)	30 – 29	(Slovakia) Tatran Prešov	SRC Lovćen, Cetinje; Attendance: 1,000; Referees: Načevski, Nikolov (MKD)
22 September 2012	Marković 11	(14–13)	Rabek 9	SRC Lovćen, Cetinje; Attendance: 1,000; Referees: Načevski, Nikolov (MKD)
22 September 2012	7× (suspension)		6× (suspension)	SRC Lovćen, Cetinje; Attendance: 1,000; Referees: Načevski, Nikolov (MKD)

29 September 2012	Borac Banja Luka (Bosnia and Herzegovina)	28 – 28	(Montenegro) Lovćen Cetinje	Borik Sports Hall, Banja Luka; Attendance: 1,500; Referees: Jurinović, Mrvica (CRO)
29 September 2012	Obradović 7	(13–12)	Marković 12	Borik Sports Hall, Banja Luka; Attendance: 1,500; Referees: Jurinović, Mrvica (CRO)
29 September 2012	3× (suspension)		4× (suspension)	Borik Sports Hall, Banja Luka; Attendance: 1,500; Referees: Jurinović, Mrvica (CRO)

05 October 2012	Lovćen Cetinje (Montenegro)	28 – 27	(Croatia) Nexe Našice	SRC Lovćen, Cetinje; Attendance: 600; Referees: Mitrevski, Todorovski (MKD)
05 October 2012	Marković 6	(13–12)	Lelić 8	SRC Lovćen, Cetinje; Attendance: 600; Referees: Mitrevski, Todorovski (MKD)
05 October 2012	4× (suspension)		4× (suspension)	SRC Lovćen, Cetinje; Attendance: 600; Referees: Mitrevski, Todorovski (MKD)

17 October 2012	Metalurg Skopje (North Macedonia)	32 – 19	(Montenegro) Lovćen Cetinje	Avtokomanda, Skopje; Attendance: 800; Referees: Gubica, Milošević (CRO)
17 October 2012	Mojsovski 6	(14–8)	Marković, Vujović 5	Avtokomanda, Skopje; Attendance: 800; Referees: Gubica, Milošević (CRO)
17 October 2012	2× (suspension)			Avtokomanda, Skopje; Attendance: 800; Referees: Gubica, Milošević (CRO)

23 October 2012	Sloga Doboj (Bosnia and Herzegovina)	29 – 33	(Montenegro) Lovćen Cetinje	Radolinka, Teslić; Attendance: 400; Referees: Gubica, Milošević (CRO)
23 October 2012	Panić 10	(14–17)	Marković, Jovetić, Grbović 8	Radolinka, Teslić; Attendance: 400; Referees: Gubica, Milošević (CRO)
23 October 2012			2× (suspension)	Radolinka, Teslić; Attendance: 400; Referees: Gubica, Milošević (CRO)

10 November 2012	CO Zagreb (Croatia)	30 – 22	(Montenegro) Lovćen Cetinje	Bogumil Toni Hall, Samobor; Attendance: 600; Referees: Šatordžija, Pandžić (BIH)
10 November 2012	Horvat 8	(13–13)	Marković 7	Bogumil Toni Hall, Samobor; Attendance: 600; Referees: Šatordžija, Pandžić (BIH)
10 November 2012	1× (suspension)		5× (suspension)	Bogumil Toni Hall, Samobor; Attendance: 600; Referees: Šatordžija, Pandžić (BIH)

13 November 2012	Lovćen Cetinje (Montenegro)	29 – 29	(Belarus) Meshkov Brest	SRC Lovćen, Cetinje; Attendance: 1,000

17 November 2012	Lovćen Cetinje (Montenegro)	23 – 21	(North Macedonia) Vardar Skopje	SRC Lovćen, Cetinje; Attendance: 1,000; Referees: Mrvica, Jurinović (CRO)
17 November 2012	Perišić 5	(14–12)	Karačić 5	SRC Lovćen, Cetinje; Attendance: 1,000; Referees: Mrvica, Jurinović (CRO)
17 November 2012	4× (suspension) 1× (red card)		4× (suspension)	SRC Lovćen, Cetinje; Attendance: 1,000; Referees: Mrvica, Jurinović (CRO)

27 November 2012	Lovćen Cetinje (Montenegro)	24 – 22	(Bosnia and Herzegovina) Izviđač Ljubuški	SRC Lovćen, Cetinje; Attendance: 700; Referees: Mitrevski, Todorovski (MKD)
27 November 2012	Vujović, Perišić 5	(13–10)	Burić 7	SRC Lovćen, Cetinje; Attendance: 700; Referees: Mitrevski, Todorovski (MKD)
27 November 2012	2× (suspension)		2× (suspension)	SRC Lovćen, Cetinje; Attendance: 700; Referees: Mitrevski, Todorovski (MKD)

09 December 2012	Lovćen Cetinje (Montenegro)	31 – 27	(Bosnia and Herzegovina) Borac Banja Luka	SRC Lovćen, Cetinje; Attendance: 400; Referees: Načevski, Nikolov (MKD)
09 December 2012	Marković 8	(13–18)	Obradović 9	SRC Lovćen, Cetinje; Attendance: 400; Referees: Načevski, Nikolov (MKD)
09 December 2012	2× (suspension)		5× (suspension)	SRC Lovćen, Cetinje; Attendance: 400; Referees: Načevski, Nikolov (MKD)

16 February 2013	Nexe Našice (Croatia)	29 – 30	(Montenegro) Lovćen Cetinje	Kralj Tomislav Hall, Našice; Attendance: 1,000; Referees: Koleski, Krkačev (MKD)
16 February 2013	Slišković 8	(16–17)	Perišić 8	Kralj Tomislav Hall, Našice; Attendance: 1,000; Referees: Koleski, Krkačev (MKD)
16 February 2013	3× (suspension)		8× (suspension)	Kralj Tomislav Hall, Našice; Attendance: 1,000; Referees: Koleski, Krkačev (MKD)

19 February 2013	Tatran Prešov (Slovakia)	36 – 29	(Montenegro) Lovćen Cetinje	City Hall Prešov, Prešov; Attendance: 1,500; Referees: Koleski, Krkačev (MKD)
19 February 2013	Urban 10	(23–14)	Popović 5	City Hall Prešov, Prešov; Attendance: 1,500; Referees: Koleski, Krkačev (MKD)
19 February 2013	6× (suspension) 2× (red card)		7× (suspension) 2× (red card)	City Hall Prešov, Prešov; Attendance: 1,500; Referees: Koleski, Krkačev (MKD)

27 February 2013	Lovćen Cetinje (Montenegro)	22 – 24	(North Macedonia) Metalurg Skopje	SRC Lovćen, Cetinje; Attendance: 1,200; Referees: Šatordžija, Pandžić (BIH)
27 February 2013	Marković, Grbović 6	(11–10)	Vugrinec 7	SRC Lovćen, Cetinje; Attendance: 1,200; Referees: Šatordžija, Pandžić (BIH)
27 February 2013	1× (suspension)		2× (suspension)	SRC Lovćen, Cetinje; Attendance: 1,200; Referees: Šatordžija, Pandžić (BIH)

02 March 2013	Lovćen Cetinje (Montenegro)	33 – 30	(Bosnia and Herzegovina) Sloga Doboj	SRC Lovćen, Cetinje; Attendance: 500; Referees: Mitrevski, Todorovski (MKD)
02 March 2013	Marković 12	(16–14)	Vukićević 7	SRC Lovćen, Cetinje; Attendance: 500; Referees: Mitrevski, Todorovski (MKD)
02 March 2013	4× (suspension) 1× (red card)		4× (suspension)	SRC Lovćen, Cetinje; Attendance: 500; Referees: Mitrevski, Todorovski (MKD)

10 March 2013	Meshkov Brest (Belarus)	33 – 30	(Montenegro) Lovćen Cetinje	Victoria Hall, Brest; Attendance: 1,000; Referees: Mandak, Rudinsky (SVK)
10 March 2013	Atajevas 9	(17–17)	Grbović 10	Victoria Hall, Brest; Attendance: 1,000; Referees: Mandak, Rudinsky (SVK)
10 March 2013	1× (suspension)		2× (suspension)	Victoria Hall, Brest; Attendance: 1,000; Referees: Mandak, Rudinsky (SVK)

16 March 2013	Lovćen Cetinje (Montenegro)	30 – 28	(Croatia) CO Zagreb	SRC Lovćen, Cetinje; Attendance: 1,500; Referees: Načevski, Nikolov (MKD)
16 March 2013	Marković 11	(16–11)	Matulić 8	SRC Lovćen, Cetinje; Attendance: 1,500; Referees: Načevski, Nikolov (MKD)
16 March 2013	3× (suspension)		1× (suspension)	SRC Lovćen, Cetinje; Attendance: 1,500; Referees: Načevski, Nikolov (MKD)

22 March 2013	Vardar Skoplje (North Macedonia)	38 – 29	(Montenegro) Lovćen Cetinje	SRC Kale, Skopje; Attendance: 1,000; Referees: Milošević, Gubica (CRO)
22 March 2013	Karačić 9	(19–11)	Radović, Lipovina, Jovetić 5	SRC Kale, Skopje; Attendance: 1,000; Referees: Milošević, Gubica (CRO)
22 March 2013	2× (suspension)		2× (suspension)	SRC Kale, Skopje; Attendance: 1,000; Referees: Milošević, Gubica (CRO)

=== Table ===
In the season 2012/13, Lovćen again finished championship at the sixth place of table.

	Team	Pld	W	D	L	GF	GA	Diff	Pts
1	(Belarus) Meshkov Brest	18	13	1	4	568	518	+50	40
2	(North Macedonia) Metalurg Skopje	18	13	0	5	471	397	+74	39
3	(North Macedonia) Vardar Skopje	18	11	3	4	540	462	+78	36
4	(Croatia) Zagreb	18	11	2	5	516	457	+59	35
5	(Slovakia) Tatran Prešov	18	11	2	5	513	471	+42	35
6	(Montenegro) Lovćen Cetinje	18	9	2	7	497	523	–26	29
7	(Croatia) Nexe Našice	18	8	1	9	501	502	-1	25
8	(Bosnia and Herzegovina) Borac Banja Luka	18	3	2	13	439	530	–91	11
9	(Bosnia and Herzegovina) Izviđač Ljubuški	18	3	0	15	417	498	–81	9
10	(Bosnia and Herzegovina) Sloga Doboj	18	1	1	16	449	553	–104	4

== SEHA League 2013-14 ==
=== Team and results ===
During the season 2013/14, in the Lovćen player roster for SEHA League were Abramović, Borilović, Cicmil (goalkeepers), Drašković, Lasica, Peruničić, Stanojević (left backs), Nikolić, Vukićević, Petričević (centre backs), Latković, Achruk, Kulenović, Ojdanić (right backs), Marković, Popović, Lipovina (left wings), Pejović, I. Radović, Čizmović (pivots), Kaluđerović and M. Radović (right wings). Coach: Kasim Kamenica (September - November 2013), Zoran Abramović (November 2013 - end of the season)

During the season, Lovćen played 18 matches in the regional competitions. With 3 wins, 2 draws and 13 defeats, that was the worst season of the club in SEHA liga. At the end, Lovćen was placed at 9th position of the table.

07 September 2013	Borac Banja Luka (Bosnia and Herzegovina)	26 – 33	(Montenegro) Lovćen Cetinje	Borik Sports Hall, Banja Luka; Attendance: 1,000; Referees: Milošević, Gubica (CRO)
07 September 2013	Trivundža 10	(11–19)	Marković 9	Borik Sports Hall, Banja Luka; Attendance: 1,000; Referees: Milošević, Gubica (CRO)
07 September 2013	3× (suspension)		3× (suspension)	Borik Sports Hall, Banja Luka; Attendance: 1,000; Referees: Milošević, Gubica (CRO)

12 September 2013	Lovćen Cetinje (Montenegro)	23 – 29	(North Macedonia) Metalurg Skopje	Morača Sports Center, Podgorica; Attendance: 500; Referees: Mrvica, Jurinović (CRO)
12 September 2013	Kulenović, Drašković, Nikolić, Achruk 3	(8–15)	Vugrinec 7	Morača Sports Center, Podgorica; Attendance: 500; Referees: Mrvica, Jurinović (CRO)
12 September 2013	2× (suspension)		1× (suspension)	Morača Sports Center, Podgorica; Attendance: 500; Referees: Mrvica, Jurinović (CRO)

21 September 2013	Partizan Belgrade (Serbia)	26 – 23	(Montenegro) Lovćen Cetinje	Banjica Sports Hall, Belgrade; Attendance: 600; Referees: Mitrevski, Todorovski (MKD)
21 September 2013	Matičić 7	(13–12)	Vukićević, Nikolić 5	Banjica Sports Hall, Belgrade; Attendance: 600; Referees: Mitrevski, Todorovski (MKD)
21 September 2013	2× (suspension)		3× (suspension)	Banjica Sports Hall, Belgrade; Attendance: 600; Referees: Mitrevski, Todorovski (MKD)

05 October 2013	Tatran Prešov (Slovakia)	32 – 29	(Montenegro) Lovćen Cetinje	Prešov City Hall, Prešov; Attendance: 1,000; Referees: Načevski, Nikolov (MKD)
05 October 2013	Antl 12	(14–15)	Popović 10	Prešov City Hall, Prešov; Attendance: 1,000; Referees: Načevski, Nikolov (MKD)
05 October 2013	4× (suspension)		4× (suspension)	Prešov City Hall, Prešov; Attendance: 1,000; Referees: Načevski, Nikolov (MKD)

08 October 2013	Vojvodina Novi Sad (Serbia)	30 – 23	(Montenegro) Lovćen Cetinje	SC Slana Bara, Novi Sad; Attendance: 500; Referees: Gubica, Milošević (CRO)
08 October 2013	Elezović 9	(17–12)	Čizmović 5	SC Slana Bara, Novi Sad; Attendance: 500; Referees: Gubica, Milošević (CRO)
08 October 2013	5× (suspension)		4× (suspension)	SC Slana Bara, Novi Sad; Attendance: 500; Referees: Gubica, Milošević (CRO)

16 October 2013	Vardar Skopje (North Macedonia)	36 – 19	(Montenegro) Lovćen Cetinje	SRC Kale, Skopje; Attendance: 1,200; Referees: Cindrić, Gonzurek (CRO)
16 October 2013	Marković 7	(21–9)	Marković 6	SRC Kale, Skopje; Attendance: 1,200; Referees: Cindrić, Gonzurek (CRO)
16 October 2013	2× (suspension)		1× (suspension)	SRC Kale, Skopje; Attendance: 1,200; Referees: Cindrić, Gonzurek (CRO)

27 October 2013	Nexe Našice (Croatia)	26 – 26	(Montenegro) Lovćen Cetinje	Gradski vrt Hall, Osijek; Attendance: 700; Referees: Načevski, Nikolov (MKD)
27 October 2013	Vujić 9	(9–15)	Marković 5	Gradski vrt Hall, Osijek; Attendance: 700; Referees: Načevski, Nikolov (MKD)
27 October 2013	5× (suspension)		6× (suspension)	Gradski vrt Hall, Osijek; Attendance: 700; Referees: Načevski, Nikolov (MKD)

08 November 2013	Lovćen Cetinje (Montenegro)	34 – 35	(Croatia) CO Zagreb	SRC Lovćen, Cetinje; Attendance: 1,500; Referees: Načevski, Nikolov (MKD)
08 November 2013	Drašković 8	(15–16)	Horvat 8	SRC Lovćen, Cetinje; Attendance: 1,500; Referees: Načevski, Nikolov (MKD)
08 November 2013	6× (suspension)		4× (suspension)	SRC Lovćen, Cetinje; Attendance: 1,500; Referees: Načevski, Nikolov (MKD)

15 November 2013	Lovćen Cetinje (Montenegro)	27 – 23	(Bosnia and Herzegovina) Borac Banja Luka	SRC Lovćen, Cetinje; Attendance: 1,000; Referees: Mitrevski, Todorovski (MKD)
15 November 2013	Vukićević 7	(14–12)	Trivundža 6	SRC Lovćen, Cetinje; Attendance: 1,000; Referees: Mitrevski, Todorovski (MKD)
15 November 2013	3× (suspension)		1× (suspension)	SRC Lovćen, Cetinje; Attendance: 1,000; Referees: Mitrevski, Todorovski (MKD)

19 November 2013	Metalurg Skopje (North Macedonia)	19 – 19	(Montenegro) Lovćen Cetinje	Avtokomanda, Skopje; Attendance: 1,000; Referees: Mitrevski, Todorovski (MKD)
19 November 2013	Atman 7	(7–10)	Vukićević 5	Avtokomanda, Skopje; Attendance: 1,000; Referees: Mitrevski, Todorovski (MKD)
19 November 2013	2× (suspension)		4× (suspension)	Avtokomanda, Skopje; Attendance: 1,000; Referees: Mitrevski, Todorovski (MKD)

29 November 2013	Lovćen Cetinje (Montenegro)	31 – 28	(Serbia) Partizan Belgrade	SRC Lovćen, Cetinje; Attendance: 1,800; Referees: Krkačev, Kolevski (MKD)
29 November 2013	Marković 10	(16–15)	Matičić 7	SRC Lovćen, Cetinje; Attendance: 1,800; Referees: Krkačev, Kolevski (MKD)
29 November 2013	6× (suspension)		4× (suspension)	SRC Lovćen, Cetinje; Attendance: 1,800; Referees: Krkačev, Kolevski (MKD)

03 December 2013	CO Zagreb (Croatia)	38 – 27	(Montenegro) Lovćen Cetinje	Arena Zagreb, Zagreb; Attendance: 300; Referees: A. Konjičanin, D. Konjičanin (BIH)
03 December 2013	Šebetić 7	(17–14)	Marković 6	Arena Zagreb, Zagreb; Attendance: 300; Referees: A. Konjičanin, D. Konjičanin (BIH)
03 December 2013	3× (suspension)		3× (suspension)	Arena Zagreb, Zagreb; Attendance: 300; Referees: A. Konjičanin, D. Konjičanin (BIH)

13 December 2013	Lovćen Cetinje (Montenegro)	24 – 30	(Belarus) Meshkov Brest	SRC Lovćen, Cetinje; Attendance: 1,000; Referees: Načevski, Nikolov (MKD)
13 December 2013	Marković 8	(10–16)	Špiler 8	SRC Lovćen, Cetinje; Attendance: 1,000; Referees: Načevski, Nikolov (MKD)
13 December 2013	3× (suspension)		3× (suspension)	SRC Lovćen, Cetinje; Attendance: 1,000; Referees: Načevski, Nikolov (MKD)

08 February 2014	Meshkov Brest (Belarus)	34 – 28	(Montenegro) Lovćen Cetinje	Victory Hall, Brest; Attendance: 500; Referees: Gubica, Milošević (CRO)
08 February 2014	Vukić 7	(17–14)	Radović 9	Victory Hall, Brest; Attendance: 500; Referees: Gubica, Milošević (CRO)
08 February 2014	2× (suspension)		2× (suspension)	Victory Hall, Brest; Attendance: 500; Referees: Gubica, Milošević (CRO)

13 February 2014	Lovćen Cetinje (Montenegro)	22 – 39	(Slovakia) Tatran Prešov	SRC Lovćen, Cetinje; Attendance: 600; Referees: Načevski, Nikolov (MKD)
13 February 2014	Vukićević 7	(8–18)	Urban 9	SRC Lovćen, Cetinje; Attendance: 600; Referees: Načevski, Nikolov (MKD)
13 February 2014	4× (suspension)		2× (suspension)	SRC Lovćen, Cetinje; Attendance: 600; Referees: Načevski, Nikolov (MKD)

28 February 2014	Lovćen Cetinje (Montenegro)	25 – 28	(Serbia) Vojvodina Novi Sad	SRC Lovćen, Cetinje; Attendance: 1,000; Referees: Mitrevski, Todorovski (MKD)
28 February 2014	Popović 9	(12–16)	Pilipović 6	SRC Lovćen, Cetinje; Attendance: 1,000; Referees: Mitrevski, Todorovski (MKD)
28 February 2014	8× (suspension) 2× (red card)		3× (suspension)	SRC Lovćen, Cetinje; Attendance: 1,000; Referees: Mitrevski, Todorovski (MKD)

06 March 2014	Lovćen Cetinje (Montenegro)	23 – 41	(North Macedonia) Vardar Skopje	SRC Lovćen, Cetinje; Attendance: 800; Referees: Jurinović, Mrvica (CRO)
06 March 2014	Radović 5	(8–23)	Raković 11	SRC Lovćen, Cetinje; Attendance: 800; Referees: Jurinović, Mrvica (CRO)
06 March 2014	2× (suspension)		1× (suspension)	SRC Lovćen, Cetinje; Attendance: 800; Referees: Jurinović, Mrvica (CRO)

14 March 2014	Lovćen Cetinje (Montenegro)	24 – 33	(Croatia) Nexe Našice	SRC Lovćen, Cetinje; Attendance: 500; Referees: Krkačev, Kolevski (MKD)
14 March 2014	Kaluđerović 7	(10–15)	Ivić 9	SRC Lovćen, Cetinje; Attendance: 500; Referees: Krkačev, Kolevski (MKD)
14 March 2014	3× (suspension)		4× (suspension)	SRC Lovćen, Cetinje; Attendance: 500; Referees: Krkačev, Kolevski (MKD)

=== Table ===
In the season 2013/14, Lovćen finished championship at the 9th place of table.

	Team	Pld	W	D	L	GF	GA	Diff	Pts
1	(Slovakia) Tatran Prešov	17	14	0	3	573	465	+108	42
2	(Croatia) Zagreb	18	13	1	4	567	496	+71	40
3	(North Macedonia) Vardar Skopje	18	12	1	5	530	458	+72	37
4	(Belarus) Meshkov Brest	18	12	1	5	496	461	+35	37
5	(North Macedonia) Metalurg Skopje	18	8	4	6	462	441	+19	28
6	(Croatia) Nexe Našice	18	7	3	8	511	499	+12	24
7	(Serbia) Vojvodina Novi Sad	18	7	0	11	460	497	-37	21
8	(Bosnia and Herzegovina) Borac Banja Luka	18	5	0	13	428	528	–100	15
9	(Montenegro) Lovćen Cetinje	18	3	2	13	459	554	–95	11
10	(Serbia) Partizan Belgrade	17	2	0	16	402	489	–87	6

== See also ==
- RK Lovćen
- RK Lovćen in the First League
- SEHA League
