= Tonči Valčić =

Croatian handball player (born 1978)

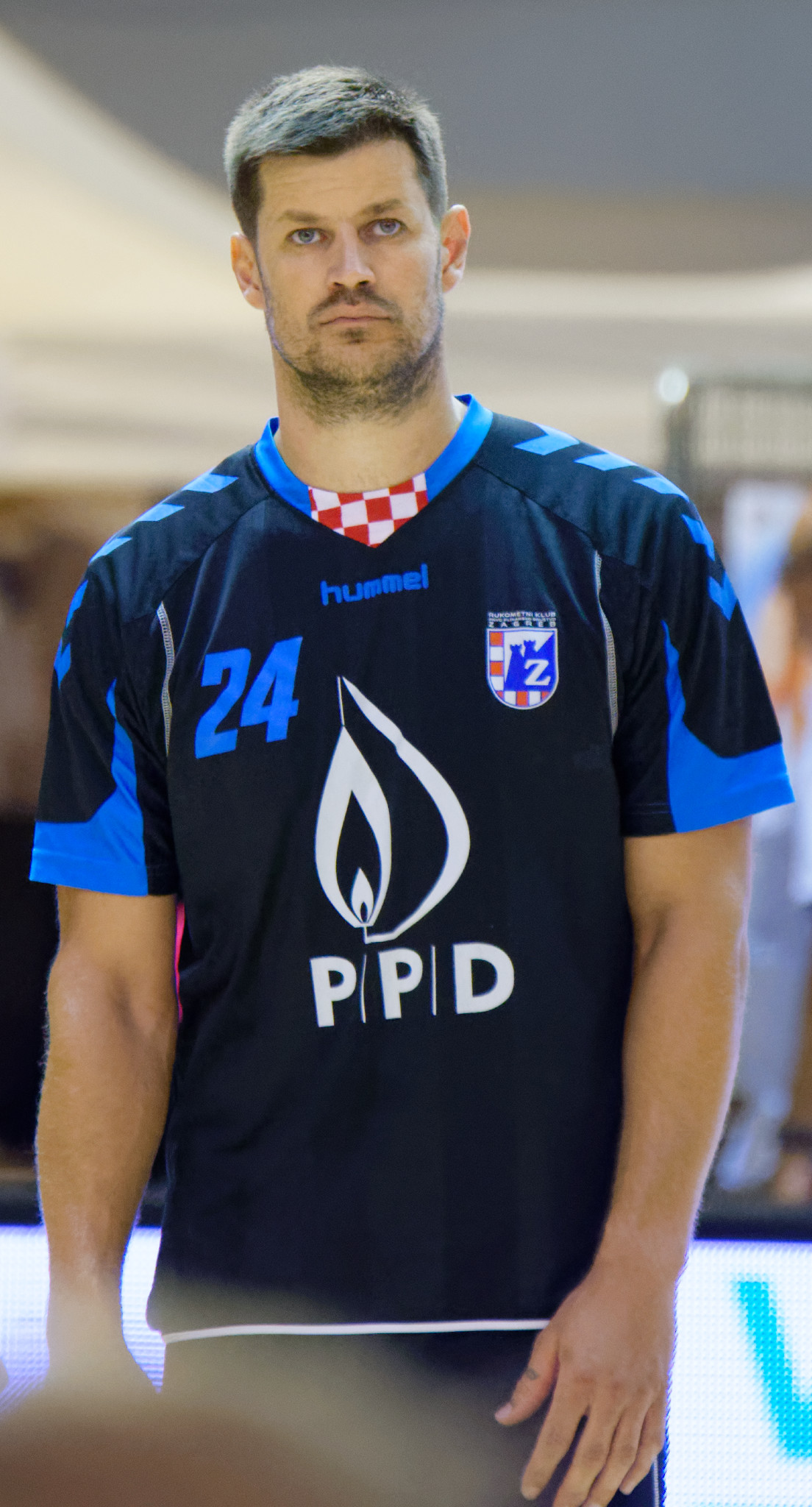
- Valčić with RK Zagreb in 2016

Personal information
- Full name: Tonči Valčić
- Nationality: Croatian
- Born: 9 June 1978 (age 48) Zadar, SFR Yugoslavia
- Height: 1.94 m (6 ft 4 in)

Sport
- Sport: Handball
- Position: Left back

Senior clubs
- Years: Team
- 1996–2000: Badel 1862 Zagreb
- 2000–2003: TV Grosswallstadt
- 2003–2007: CB Torrevieja
- 2007–2008: CB Ademar León
- 2008–2018: RK Zagreb
National team
Years	Team	Apps	(Gls)
1999–2010	Croatia	144	(226)

Teams managed
- 2018–2019: RK Zagreb (assistant)
- 2019–2020: Beijing Sport University (assistant)
- 2020–2023: RK Zagreb (assistant)
Medal record
Representing Croatia
Men's handball
World Championship
Gold medal – first place	2003 Portugal	Team competition
Silver medal – second place	2009 Croatia	Team competition
European Championship
Silver medal – second place	2008 Norway	Team competition
Silver medal – second place	2010 Austria	Team competition

Tonči Valčić (born 9 June 1978) is a Croatian former professional handball player.

He was a member of the Croatia national team at the 2008 Summer Olympics.

== Playing career ==
Valčić began his career in Croatian powerhouse RK Zagreb where he has played for the majority of this career.

Valčić played for three seasons in Germany for TV Grosswallstadt. He also played in Spain for CB Torrevieja and CB Ademar León before returning to Croatia.

Valčić debuted for the national team at the 1999 World Men's Handball Championship in Egypt.

He played for the national team from 1999 to 2010 winning the 2003 World Men's Handball Championship and coming to the finals of 2008 European Men's Handball Championship, 2009 World Men's Handball Championship and 2010 European Men's Handball Championship.

== Coaching career ==
After end of playing career he became an assistant coach under the staff of Lino Červar in RK Zagreb, during the 2018–19 season.

== Personal life ==
His younger brother is Josip Valčić.

== Honours ==
Zagreb

- Premier League
  - Winner (13): 1996–97, 1997–98, 1998–99, 1999–00, 2008–09, 2009–10, 2010–11, 2011–12, 2012–13, 2013–14, 2014–15, 2015–16, 2016–17
- Croatian Cup
  - Winner (13): 1997, 1998, 1999, 2000, 2008, 2009, 2010, 2011, 2012, 2013, 2014, 2015, 2016, 2017
- SEHA League
  - Winner (1): 2012-13
  - Third place (4): 2011-12, 2013-14, 2014-15, 2015-16

CB Torrevieja

- Honor B
  - Promotion (1): 2003-04
