= Ivan Stevanović (handballer) =

Croatian handball player (born 1982)

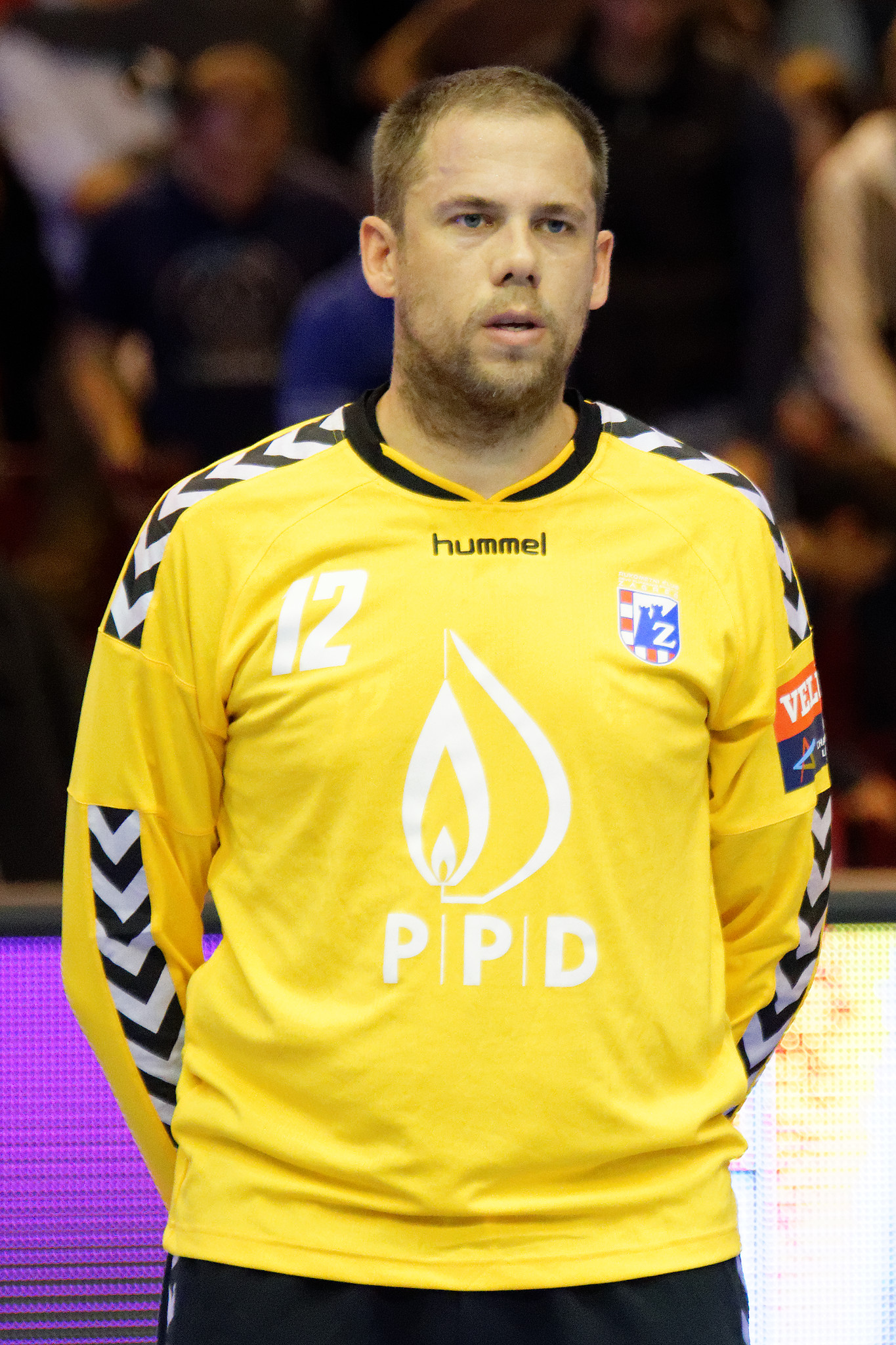
- Stevanović with RK Zagreb in 2015

Personal information
- Nationality: Croatian
- Born: 18 May 1982 (age 44) Rijeka, SR Croatia, SFR Yugoslavia
- Height: 1.93 m (6 ft 4 in)

Sport
- Sport: Handball
- Position: Goalkeeper

Youth career
- Years: Team
- 1995–1999: RK Trsat

Senior clubs
- Years: Team
- 1998–1999: RK Trsat
- 1999–2000: RK Pećine
- 2000–2007: RK Zamet
- 2007–2009: RK Poreč
- 2009–2010: RD Krško
- 2010–2012: RK Zamet
- 2012–2017: RK Zagreb
- 2017–2019: Kadetten Schaffhausen
- 2019–2021: Wisła Płock
National team
| Years | Team | Apps | (Gls) |
| 2007–2019 | Croatia | 68 | (2) |

Teams managed
- 2022–2023: RK Podravka Koprivnica (GK coach)
Medal record
European Championship
| Bronze medal – third place | 2016 Poland |
Mediterranean Games
| Silver medal – second place | 2013 Mersin | Team |

Ivan Stevanović (born 18 May 1982) is a retired Croatian handball player.

He is one of the oldest players to debut for a national team at a major competition. He debuted at the 2016 European Championship in Poland as the second choice goalkeeper to Mirko Alilović, but he ended up being the biggest reason for his country winning the bronze medal.

== Early life ==
Stevanović was born 18 May 1982 in Rijeka.

Stevanović grew up in the neighborhood of Trsat across the street from Dvorana Mladosti then the venue of RK Zamet.

At the age of eight Stevanović started to train swimming with Bistra Gospodinova as his coach.

At the end of the eight grade Stevanović was a goalkeeper for his schools handball team. Later he would train swimming and handball at the same time while opting for handball in the end.

== Club career ==
Stevanović began his youth career in hometown club Trsat in which he played for five years in youth selection before playing as a senior at the age of 16. He also spent a year playing for Pećine in the then 1.B league before joining RK Zamet. During his early years at the club he was mostly coached by his colleague Valter Matošević.

He played for the club for seven years. He went from being third to first choice goalkeeper. With the club he played in EHF Cup Winners' Cup and EHF Cup, also coming to the finals of the Croatian Cup two times and keeping a position in the top 6 in the league.

In 2007 Stevanović moved to Poreč where he maintained a vital role in the clubs great results and qualification for the Challenger Cup. Even though there was talk of a transfer to Slovenia he opted for the Istrian side. In 2009 Stevanović received an award from the city of Poreč for being their best male sportsperson for the year of 2008.

He also spent a season in Slovenian club RD Krško where he was trained by head coach Željko Babić.

Stevanović returned to Zamet in 2010. The next season Zamet came into the finals of the Croatian Cup, Stevanoviće's goalkeeping gave interest to Croatian champions Croatia Osiguranje Zagreb. Zagreb bought Stevanović in the summer of 2012. In his first season with the club Stevanović won the SEHA League. The next four seasons with Zagreb saw Stevanović winning domestic competitions and cups while reaching EHF Champions League quarter-finals and finishing third in the SEHA League.

On 5 December 2016 it was confirmed that Stevanović had signed a three-year contract with Swiss club Kadetten Schaffhausen stating that he would be leaving RK Zagreb at the end of the season.

== International career ==
Stevanović was first called up for the Croatian national team by Lino Červar in 2007 for national team preparations in Poreč.

He was called up again in 2013 by coach Slavko Goluža to play at the 2013 Mediterranean Games in Mersin. Croatia lost in the finals against Egypt and got a silver medal.

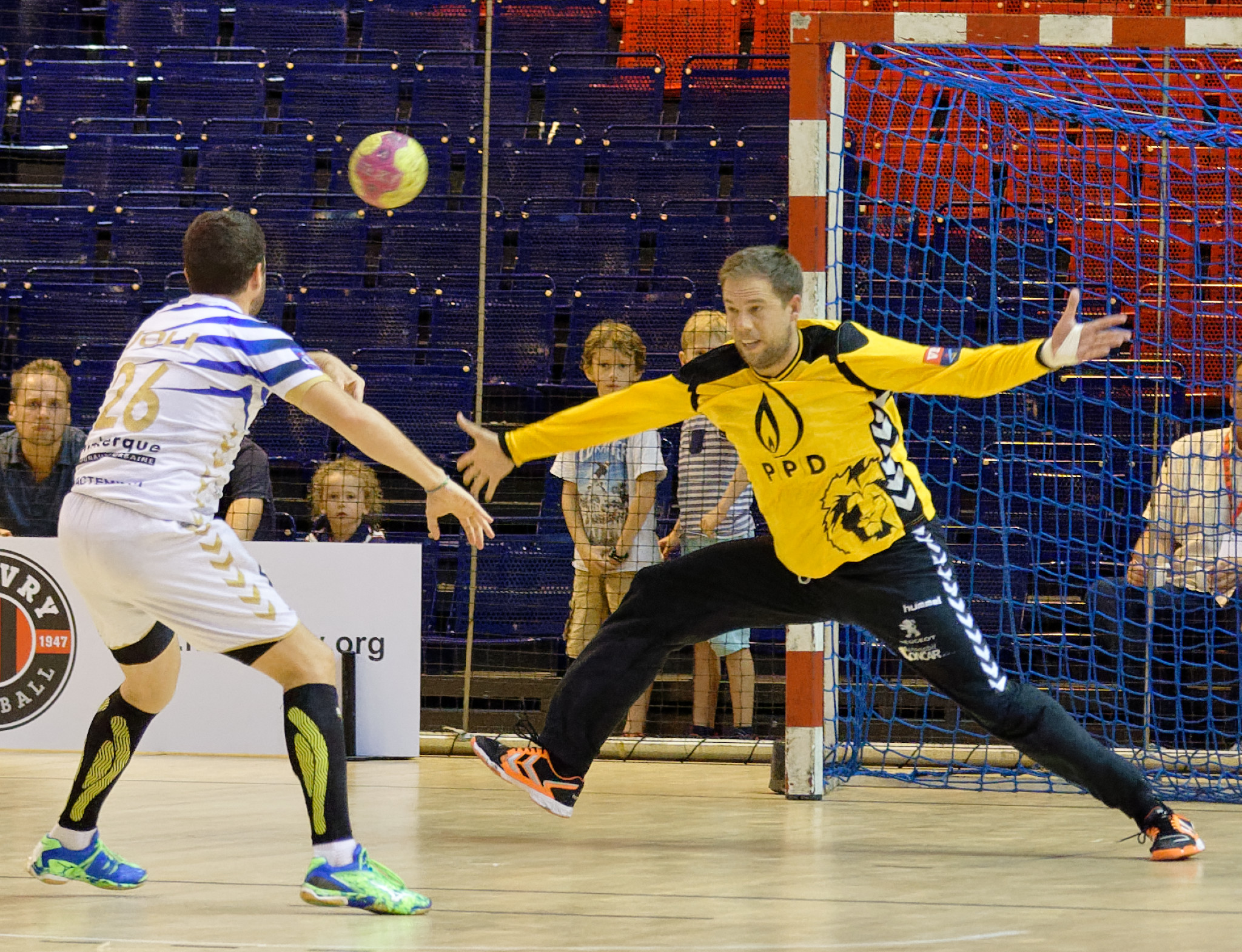
2016 Marrane Challenge US Dunkerque vs RK Zagreb. 4 September 2016.

He competed at the 2016 European Men's Handball Championship as a replacement for Filip Ivić who was injured. At the beginning of the tournament Stevanović was second choice to Mirko Alilović but soon he became first choice and saved Croatia from being knocked out of the group stage. He had a very big role in Croatia winning the bronze medal. In August of the same year he played for the national team at the 2016 Summer Olympics in Rio de Janeiro where Croatia finished in fifth place. Stevanović was 7th best goalkeeper at the tournament with 35 save and a 31% percentage.

Stevanović was called up once again to train with the national team for the 2017 World Championship in France.

During a group stage match against Chile at the 2017 World Championship Stevanović scored from his goal post to an empty goal. He played a vital role in the quarter-final match against Spain getting some crucial saves. Croatia finished in fourth place losing to Slovenia in the third place match. Stevanović had 47 saves at the end of the tournament with 31%.

On 26 January 2019 he confirmed he is going to retirement of the Croatian national team after 2019 World Men's Handball Championship.

== Personal life ==
Stevanović is married, his wife's name is Irena. The couple have a son named Vigo. Stevanović has stated that he spends most of his free time with his son.

== Honours ==
Club
Zamet

- Croatian Cup
  - Finalist: 2000, 2001, 2012

PPD Zagreb

- Dukat Premier League
  - Winner: 2012–13, 2013–14, 2014–15, 2015–16, 2016–17
- Croatian Cup
  - Winner: 2013, 2014, 2015, 2016, 2017
- SEHA League
  - Winner: 2012–13
  - Third: 2013–14, 2014–15, 2015–16

Kadetten Schaffhausen

- SHV-Super Cup
  - Winner: 2017

International
Croatia

- 2013 Mediterranean Games – silver medal
- 2016 European Championship – bronze medal

Individual

- Best sportsperson in Poreč – 2008
- Dukat Premier League best saves average from 9m in 2010–11 season – 6,30 avg
- Dukat Premier League best saves total from 9m in 2010–11 – 170
- Best goalkeeper in Croatian Cup – 2012
- Best goalkeeper at Schlecker Cup – 2013
- SEHA League best saves total from 9m in 2013–14 season – 90 saves
- Dukat Premier League best saves total from 6m in 2013–14 – 36,1%
- SEHA League best 9m saves percentage in 2014–15 season – 56,4%
- 2016 EC: Poland vs Croatia man of the match
- 2016 European Championship 2nd best goalkeeper by percentage – 37%
- SEHA League best saves percentage in 2015–16 season – 41,3%
- SEHA League best 9m saves percentage in 2015–16 season – 53,6%
- SEHA League best 6m saves percentage in 2015–16 season – 34,2%
- SEHA League best 6m saves percentage in fastbreaks in 2015–16 season – 25,0%
- SEHA League best goalkeeper in 2015–16 season
- Dukat Premier League best saves percentage in 2015–16 season – 35,7%
- 2nd best Croatian handballer of 2016 by CHF & Sportske novosti
- Best goalkeeper in SEHA League 2016–17 season
- 2018 European Championship man of the match: vs. Norway
