= Zlatko Horvat =

Croatian handball player (born 1984)

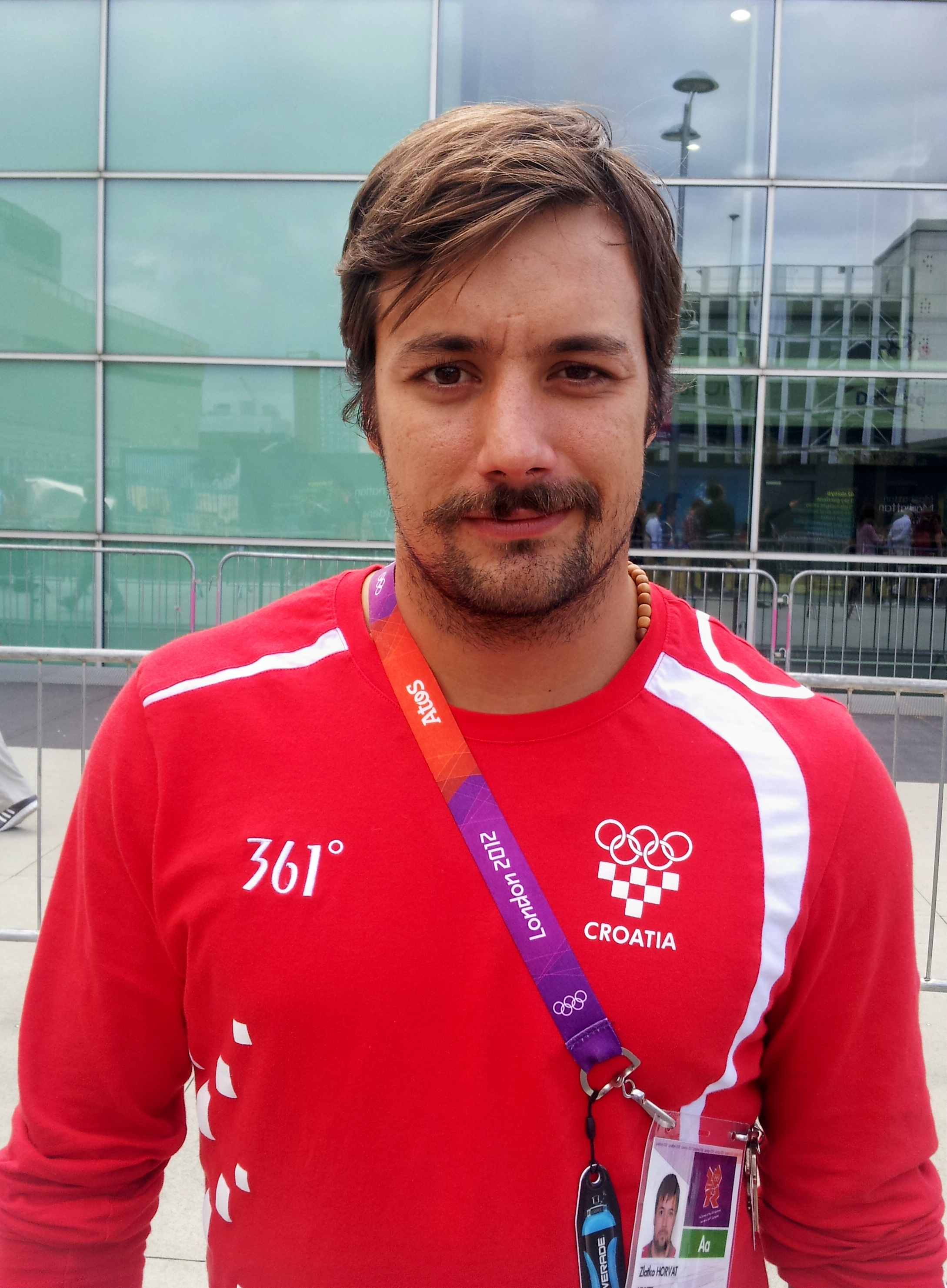
- Horvat with Croatia at the 2012 Summer Olympics

Personal information
- Nationality: Croatian
- Born: 25 September 1984 (age 42) Zagreb, SR Croatia, SFR Yugoslavia
- Height: 1.79 m (5 ft 10 in)

Sport
- Sport: Handball
- Position: Right wing
- Current club: RK Dubrava Zagreb
- Number: 18

Senior clubs
- Years: Team
- 2002–2020: RK Zagreb
- 2020–2021: RK Metalurg Skopje
- 2022–2025: Dabas KK
- 2024: → RK Zagreb (loan)
- 2025–: RK Dubrava Zagreb
National team
Years	Team	Apps	(Gls)
2005–2020	Croatia	182	(565)
Medal record
Olympic Games
Bronze medal – third place	2012 London	Team
World Championship
Silver medal – second place	2009 Croatia
Bronze medal – third place	2013 Spain
European Championship
Silver medal – second place	2008 Norway
Silver medal – second place	2020 Sweden/Austria/Norway
Bronze medal – third place	2012 Serbia
Bronze medal – third place	2016 Poland
Mediterranean Games
Silver medal – second place	2005 Almería	Team

Zlatko Horvat (born 25 September 1984) is a Croatian handball player for RK Dubrava Zagreb.

== Career ==
Since 2003 Horvat's Zagreb has not lost a match in the domestic league and cup. Horvat has reached the quarter-final of the EHF Champions League in 2002–03, 2003–04, 2008–09, 2011–12, 2014–15 and 2015–16. In 2013 Zagreb had won the SEHA League.

He represented his country at the European Championships in 2006 and 2008 as well as the 2009 World Championship, winning two silver medals with the team. He also played for Croatia at the 2008 Summer Olympics in Beijing, China and the 2012 Summer Olympics where Croatia won bronze.

== Honours ==
Zagreb

- Dukat Premier League
  - Winner: 2002–03, 2003–04, 2004–05, 2005–06, 2006–07, 2007–08, 2008–09, 2009–10, 2010–11, 2011–12, 2012–13, 2013–14, 2014–15, 2015–16, 2016–17
- Croatian Cup
  - Winner: 2003, 2004, 2005, 2006, 2007, 2008, 2009, 2010, 2011, 2012, 2013, 2014, 2015, 2016, 2017
- SEHA League:
  - Winner: 2012–13
  - Third place: 2011–12, 2013–14, 2014–15, 2015–16
- EHF Cup Winners' Cup
  - Finalist: 2005

Individual

- Most 7m goals in 2013–14 SEHA League — 35 goals
