= Ivan Pešić (handballer) =

Croatian handball player (born 1989)

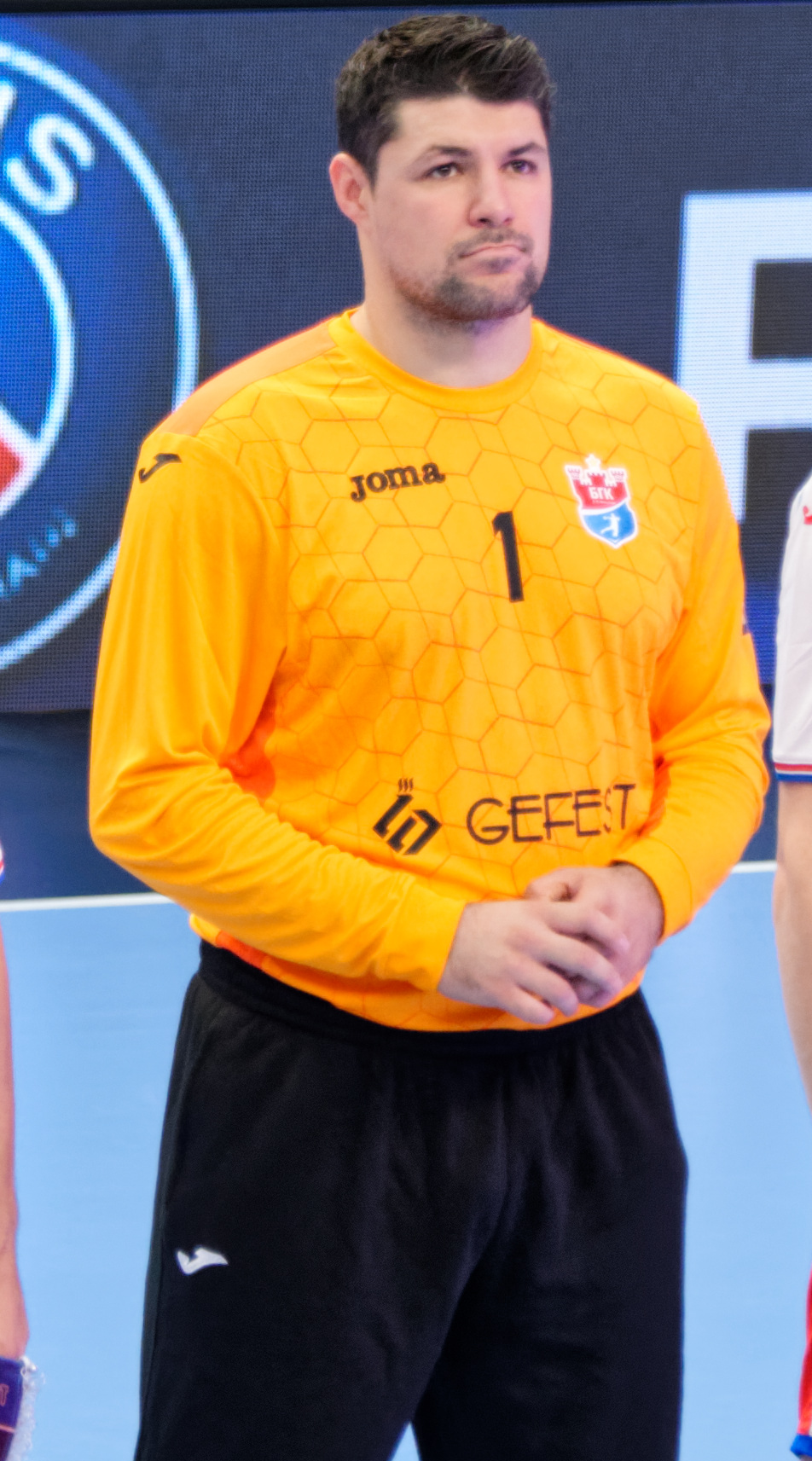

Personal information
- Nationality: Croatian
- Born: 17 March 1989 (age 37) Rijeka, SR Croatia, Yugoslavia
- Height: 1.93 m (6 ft 4 in)

Sport
- Sport: Handball
- Position: Goalkeeper
- Current club: HBC Nantes

Youth career
- Years: Team
- –: RK Senj
- 2004–2006: RK Zamet

Senior clubs
- Years: Team
- 2004–2006: RK Zamet II
- 2006–2008: RK Zamet
- 2008–2009: MVM Veszprém KC
- 2009–2012: RK Zagreb
- 2012–2013: RK Maribor Branik
- 2013–2021: HC Meshkov Brest
- 2021–2022: TVB 1898 Stuttgart
- 2022–: HBC Nantes
National team
| Years | Team | Apps | (Gls) |
| 2008–2025 | Croatia | 44 | (1) |
Medal record
World Championship
| Silver medal – second place | 2025 Croatia/Denmark/Norway |
Mediterranean Games
| Silver medal – second place | 2013 Mersin | Team |
Youth World Championship
| Silver medal – second place | 2007 Bahrain |
European Youth Championship
| Gold medal – first place | 2006 Estonia |

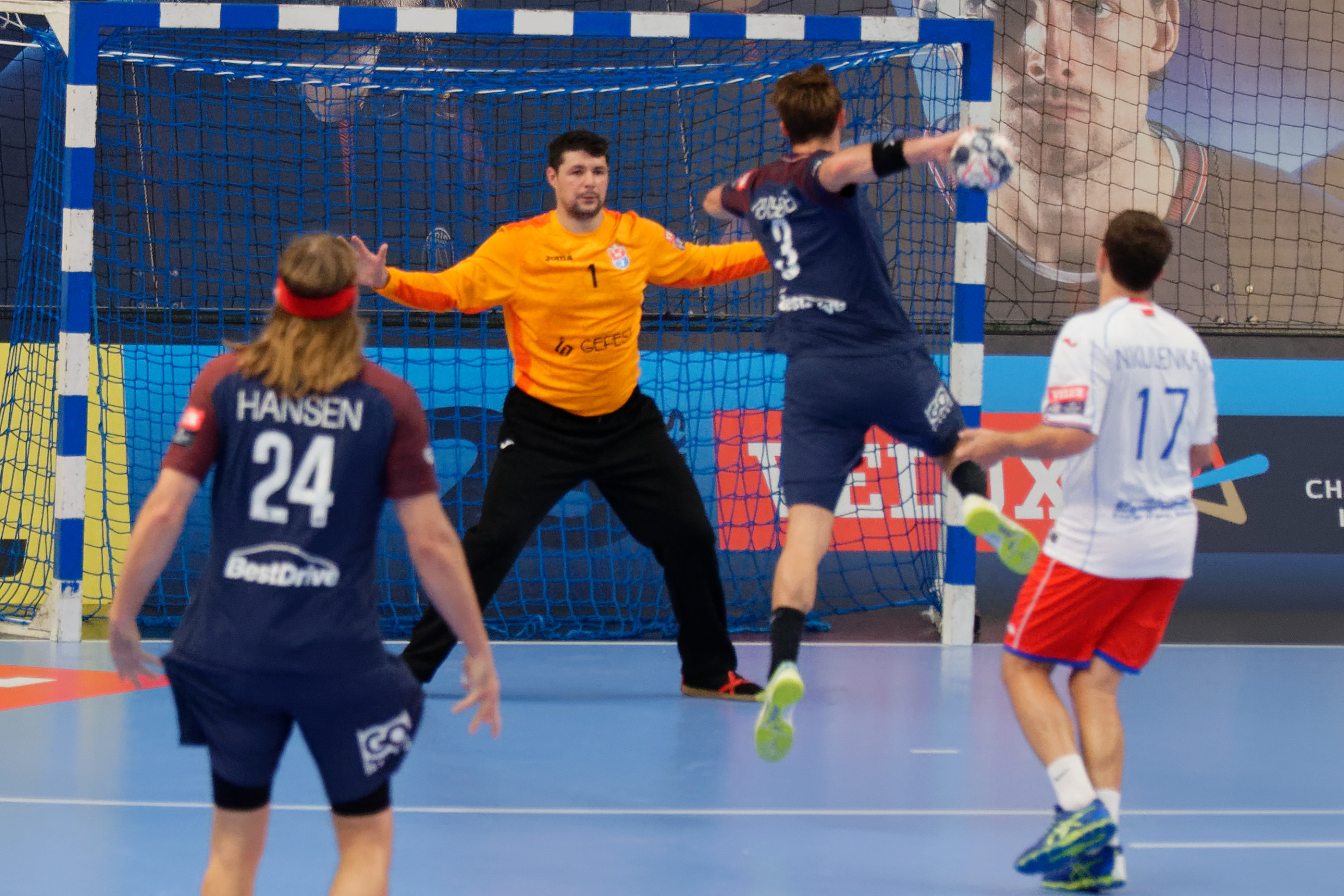
Sep. 24, 2017

Ivan Pešić (born 17 March 1989) is a Croatian handball goalkeeper for HBC Nantes.

During his first few years as a player, Pešić played in his hometown Rijeka with RK Zamet and with production license in Croatian second division club RK Senj. He then played for the Hungarian club MKB Veszprém KC, with which he won in the 2008/09 season, league and cup, as well as the Croatian first division club RK Zagreb, with whom he won three times the double. In 2012 he joined the Slovenian club RK Maribor Branik . After one season, he signed with the Belarusian club HC Meshkov Brest, with whom he again champion and cup winner was, 2014.

At a dance hall in February 2009 some Hungarian-Romani people attacked Pešić and teammate Marian Cozma with a knife. Pešić was so badly injured by a knife that he had to remove a kidney. His teammate Marian Cozma died after two stab wounds to the heart, another colleague, Žarko Šešum, suffered skull fractures due to heavy kicks to the head.

Even though Pešić was an unseen substitute at the 2009 World Men's Handball Championship in Croatia he still won a medal.

Pešić has played for Croatia at the 2011 World Championship, 2013 Mediterranean Games and has recently been called up for the 2016 Summer Olympics qualification tournament

== Honours ==
Zamet II

- 3. HRL - West: 2004–05
- Croatian Championship U-18 runner-up: 2008

Veszprém

- Hungarian Premier League: 2008–09
- Magyar Cup: 2009

Zagreb

- Dukat Premier League: 2009–10, 2010–11, 2011–12
- Croatian Cup: 2010, 2011, 2012

Meshkov Brest

- Belarusian First League: 2013–14, 2014–15, 2015–16, 2016–17
- Belarusian Cup: 2014, 2015, 2016, 2017
- SEHA League runner-up: 2013–14, 2014–15

Nantes

- Coupe de France: 2022–23

Individual

- Dražen Petrović Award - 2007
