= Dobrivoje Marković =

Serbian handball player (born 1986)

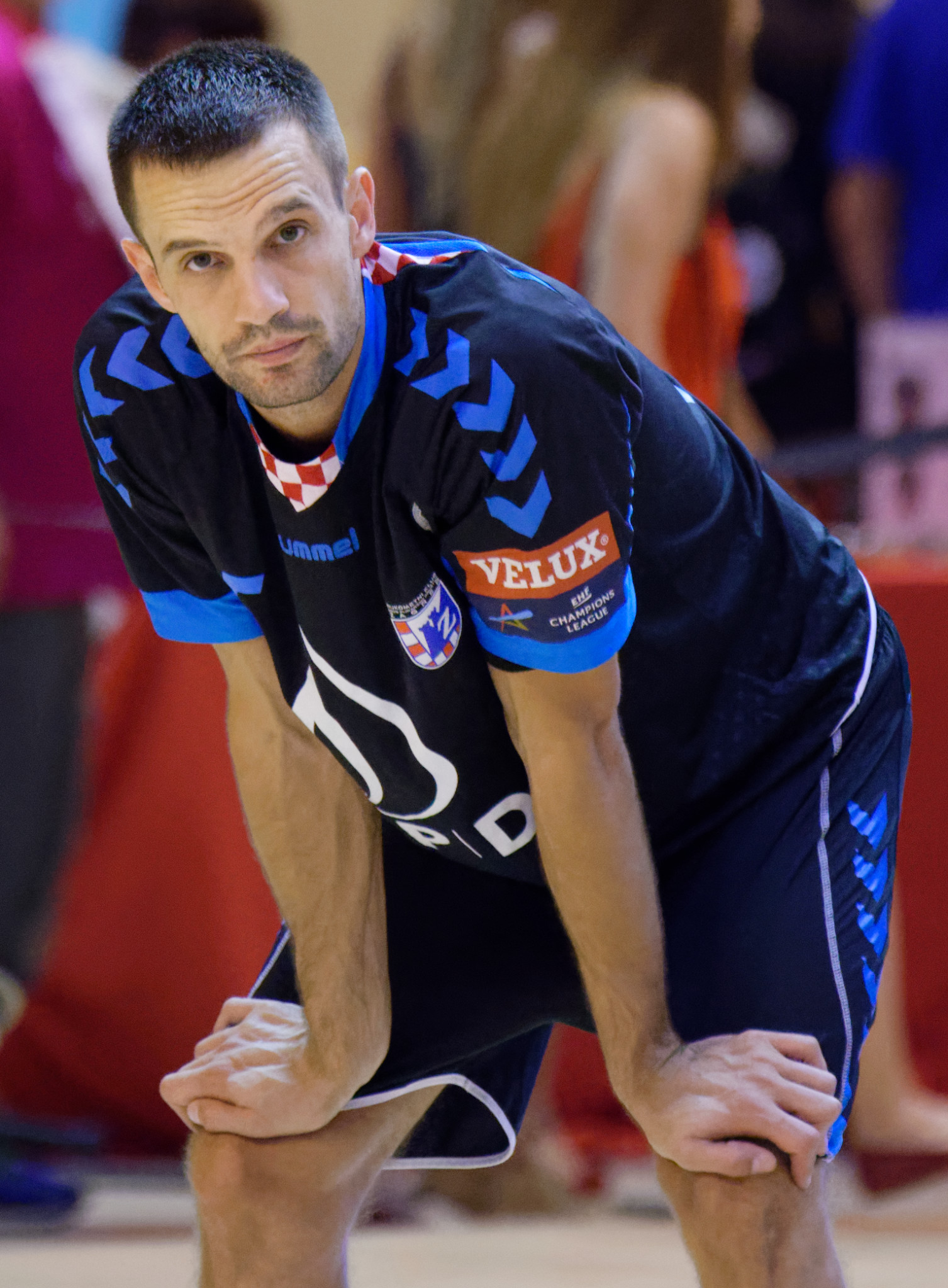
- Marković in 2016 with RK Zagreb.

Personal information
- Full name: Dobrivoje Marković
- Nationality: Serbian
- Born: 22 April 1986 (age 40) Teslić, SR Bosnia-Herzegovina, SFR Yugoslavia
- Height: 1.88 m (6 ft 2 in)

Sport
- Sport: Handball
- Position: Left wing
- Current club: Hercegovac Gajdobra

Youth career
- Years: Team
- –: Jugović

Senior clubs
- Years: Team
- 2002–2008: Jugović
- 2008–2011: Cuenca
- 2011–2015: Vardar
- 2015–2018: Zagreb
- 2018–2019: Železničar 1949
- 2019: Novi Pazar
- 2020: Jugović
- 2020–: Hercegovac Gajdobra
National team
Years	Team	Apps	(Gls)
2006–2019	Serbia	110	(223)
Medal record
Men's handball
Representing Serbia and Montenegro
U19 World Championship
Gold medal – first place	2005 Qatar	Team
U18 European Championship
Gold medal – first place	2004 Serbia and Montenegro	Team
Representing Serbia
European Championship
Silver medal – second place	2012 Serbia	Team
Mediterranean Games
Gold medal – first place	2009 Pescara	Team

Dobrivoje Marković (Serbian Cyrillic: Добривоје Марковић; born 22 April 1986) is a Serbian handball player for Hercegovac Gajdobra.

== Club career ==
After starting out at Jugović, Marković moved to Spain and joined Cuenca in 2008. He also played abroad for Vardar and Zagreb, winning numerous trophies. In 2018, Marković returned to his homeland and signed with Železničar 1949.

== International career ==
=== Youth ===
At youth level, Marković was a regular member of the Serbia and Montenegro winning squad at the 2004 European Under-18 Championship. He also helped the nation win the gold medal at the 2005 World Under-19 Championship.

=== Senior ===
A full Serbia international since its inception, Marković was a member of the team that won the silver medal at the 2012 European Championship. He also participated in the 2012 Summer Olympics.

== Honours ==
Vardar

- Macedonian Handball Super League: 2012–13, 2014–15
- Macedonian Handball Cup: 2011–12, 2013–14, 2014–15
- SEHA League: 2011–12, 2013–14

Zagreb

- Croatian Handball Premier League: 2015–16, 2016–17, 2017–18
- Croatian Handball Cup: 2015–16, 2016–17, 2017–18
