= Nemanja Grbović =

Montenegrin handball player (born 1990)

Personal information
- Nationality: Montenegrin
- Born: 26 April 1990 (age 36) Pljevlja, SR Montenegro, Yugoslavia
- Height: 1.87 m (6 ft 2 in)

Sport
- Sport: Handball
- Position: Pivot
- Current club: CSA Steaua
- Number: 90
National team
Years	Team	Apps	(Gls)
–	Montenegro	80	(225)

Nemanja Grbović (born 26 April 1990) is a Montenegrin handball player for CSA Steaua.
