= 2011–12 SEHA League =

2011-12 SEHA League season
- League: SEHA League
- Sport: Handball
- Duration: 10 September 2011 – 15 April 2012
- Teams: Bosnia and Herzegovina (3 teams); Croatia (2 teams); Serbia (2 teams); Montenegro (2 teams); Macedonia (2 teams); Slovakia (1 team)

Regular season
- Season champions: (Croatia) Zagreb CO

Final Four
- Finals champions: (North Macedonia) Vardar
- Runners-up: (North Macedonia) Metalurg

SEHA League seasons
- 2012–13

The 2011–12 season is the 1st inaugural season of the SEHA League and 12 teams from Bosnia and Herzegovina, Croatia, Serbia, Montenegro, Macedonia and Slovakia participate in it.

== Team information ==
=== Venues and locations ===
Country	Teams	Team	City	Venue (Capacity)	2010-11 result
Bosnia and Herzegovina	3				
Bosnia and Herzegovina	3	Bosna BH Gas	Sarajevo	KSC Skenderija (5,000)	Bosnian league, 1st
Bosnia and Herzegovina	3	Izviđač Mi Grupa	Ljubuški	Gradska sportska dvorana Ljubuški (4,000)	Bosnian league, 3rd
Bosnia and Herzegovina	3	Borac m:tel	Banja Luka	Sportska dvorana Borik (5,000)	Bosnian league, 2nd
Croatia	2				
Croatia	2	CO Zagreb	Zagreb	Arena Zagreb (15,200)	Croatian league, 1st
Croatia	2	Nexe Našice	Našice	Sportska dvorana kralja Tomislava (2,500)	Croatian league, 2nd
Serbia	2				
Serbia	2	Crvena zvezda	Beograd	SC Šumice (2,000)	Serbian league, 2nd
Serbia	2	Metaloplastika	Šabac	Dvorana Zorka (3,000)	Serbian league, 4th
Montenegro	2				
Montenegro	2	Lovćen	Cetinje	Sala RK Lovćen (1,500)	Montenegrin league, 2nd
Montenegro	2	Sutjeska	Nikšić	Dvorana SRC Nikšić (2,600)	Montenegrin league, 3rd
Macedonia	2				
Macedonia	2	Vardar PRO	Skopje	SRC Kale (2,500)	Macedonian league, 2nd
Macedonia	2	Metalurg	Skopje	Hala Avtokomanda (2,000)	Macedonian league, 1st
Slovakia	1				
Slovakia	1	Tatran Prešov	Prešov	City Hall Presov (3,850)	Slovak league, 1st

RK Partizan (Serbian league, 1st) and RK Mojkovac (Montenegrin league, 1st) declined participation.

Location of teams in the SEHA League 2011–12
Location of teams in the SEHA League 2011–12

== Regular season ==
=== Standings ===
	Team	Pld	W	D	L	GF	GA	Diff	Pts
1	(Croatia) CO Zagreb	22	17	2	3	698	542	+156	53
2	(North Macedonia) Vardar PRO	22	17	2	3	579	507	+72	53
3	(Slovakia) Tatran Prešov	22	17	1	4	695	577	+118	52
4	(North Macedonia) Metalurg	22	14	3	5	514	430	+84	45
5	(Croatia) Nexe Našice	22	12	3	7	628	569	+59	39
6	(Montenegro) Lovćen	22	12	0	10	547	562	–15	36
7	(Bosnia and Herzegovina) Borac Banja Luka	22	11	2	9	620	576	+44	35
8	(Serbia) Metaloplastika	22	6	2	14	493	535	–42	20
9	(Bosnia and Herzegovina) Bosna Sarajevo	22	6	1	15	407	547	–140	19
10	(Bosnia and Herzegovina) Izviđač	22	4	1	17	514	589	–75	13
11	(Serbia) Crvena zvezda	22	4	0	18	466	567	–101	12
12	(Montenegro) Sutjeska	22	3	1	18	474	604	–130	10

Qualified for Final four

Pld - Played; W - Won; L - Lost; PF - Points for; PA - Points against; Diff - Difference; Pts - Points.

As of 6 April 2012

=== Results ===
In the table below the home teams are listed on the left and the away teams along the top.

	(Bosnia and Herzegovina) BOR	(Bosnia and Herzegovina) BOS	(Serbia) CZV	(Bosnia and Herzegovina) IZV	(Montenegro) LOV	(Serbia) MPL	(North Macedonia) MET	(Croatia) NEX	(Montenegro) SUT	(Slovakia) TAT	(North Macedonia) VAR	(Croatia) ZAG
(Bosnia and Herzegovina) Borac Banja Luka		36–14	35–25	31–26	25–24	32–22	26–31	22–22	23–20	24–33	37–29	24–29
(Bosnia and Herzegovina) Bosna Sarajevo	24–23		10-0	10-0	18–28	10-0	19–31^{1}	26–23	30–24	28–38	19–32	25–39^{2}
(Serbia) Crvena zvezda	20–24	10-0		24–26	10-0	23–27	10-0	32–37	20–21	29–40	22–26	25–50^{2}
(Bosnia and Herzegovina) Izviđač	20–23	10-0	29–31		26–30	33–27	21–26	26–27	29–27	27–36	27–28	24–29
(Montenegro) Lovćen	31–30	29–25	26–20	27–19		28–22	20–21	24–22	31–22	25–37	24–29	27–25
(Serbia) Metaloplastika	28–28	25–22	33–23	28–22	21–25		17–25	26–29	10-0	27–27	22–23	22–31
(North Macedonia) Metalurg	26–25	36–11	28–18	31–16	32–17	21–19		26–26	31–23	32–24	18–18	19–19
(Croatia) Nexe Našice	28–23	40–21	32–29	35–34	32–21	31–23	29–27		32–19	35–36	21–27	20–20
(Montenegro) Sutjeska	22–32	23–17	29–22	19–19	20–26	20–22	22–28	17–32		20–26	24–29	30–33
(Slovakia) Tatran Prešov	31–35	36–25	36–29	39–30	34–31	27–20	10-0	28–26	42–22		29–20	32–31
(North Macedonia) Vardar PRO	34–30	26–26	35–24	26–21	34–29	27–25	10-0	26–25	33–23	26–25		10-0
(Croatia) CO Zagreb	37–32	38–27	32–19	35–29	38–24	28–27	30–25	36–24	37–27	35–29	36–31	

- ^{1}played in Skopje
- ^{2}played in Zagreb

== Final four ==
=== Semifinals ===
14 April 2012; 15:30	Metalurg (North Macedonia)	26 – 25	(Slovakia) Tatran Prešov	Arena Zagreb, Zagreb; Attendance: 500; Referees: Gubica, Milošević (CRO)
14 April 2012; 15:30	Marković 6	(15–11)	Krištopāns 9	Arena Zagreb, Zagreb; Attendance: 500; Referees: Gubica, Milošević (CRO)
14 April 2012; 15:30	1× (suspension)		4× (suspension)	Arena Zagreb, Zagreb; Attendance: 500; Referees: Gubica, Milošević (CRO)

14 April 2012; 18:00	CO Zagreb (Croatia)	29 – 30	(North Macedonia) Vardar PRO	Arena Zagreb, Zagreb; Attendance: 2,500; Referees: Brunovsky, Canda (SVK)
14 April 2012; 18:00	Horvat 7	(14–13)	Doder 6	Arena Zagreb, Zagreb; Attendance: 2,500; Referees: Brunovsky, Canda (SVK)
14 April 2012; 18:00	2× (yellow card) 2× (suspension)	Report	3× (yellow card) 3× (suspension)	Arena Zagreb, Zagreb; Attendance: 2,500; Referees: Brunovsky, Canda (SVK)

=== Match for third place ===
15 April 2012; 15:30	CO Zagreb (Croatia)	31 – 29	(Slovakia) Tatran Prešov	Arena Zagreb, Zagreb; Attendance: 1,000; Referees: Načevski, Nikolov (MKD)
15 April 2012; 15:30	Horvat 10	(14–11)	Kopco 8	Arena Zagreb, Zagreb; Attendance: 1,000; Referees: Načevski, Nikolov (MKD)
15 April 2012; 15:30	2× (yellow card) 4× (suspension)	Report	3× (yellow card) 3× (suspension)	Arena Zagreb, Zagreb; Attendance: 1,000; Referees: Načevski, Nikolov (MKD)

=== Final ===
15 April 2012; 18:00	Metalurg (North Macedonia)	18 – 21	(North Macedonia) Vardar PRO	Arena Zagreb, Zagreb; Attendance: 1,500; Referees: Gubica, Milošević (CRO)
15 April 2012; 18:00	Marković 7	(12–10)	Sobol 6	Arena Zagreb, Zagreb; Attendance: 1,500; Referees: Gubica, Milošević (CRO)
15 April 2012; 18:00	2× (yellow card) 3× (suspension)	Report	1× (yellow card) 3× (suspension)	Arena Zagreb, Zagreb; Attendance: 1,500; Referees: Gubica, Milošević (CRO)
