= 2015–16 SEHA League =

2015-16 SEHA League season
- League: SEHA League
- Sport: Handball
- Duration: 1 September 2015 – 3 April 2016
- Games: 90 (regular season); 94 (including F4 tournament)
- Teams: Belarus (1 team); Bosnia and Herzegovina (1 team); Croatia (2 teams); Hungary (1 team); Macedonia (2 teams); Serbia (2 teams); Slovakia (1 team)

Regular season
- Season champions: (Hungary) MVM Veszprém
- Season MVP: Momir Ilić
- Top scorer: Radoslav Antl (99 goals)

Final Four
- Finals champions: (Hungary) MVM Veszprém
- Runners-up: (North Macedonia) Vardar
- Finals MVP: Momir Ilić

SEHA League seasons
- 2014–15 2016–17

The 2015–16 season is the fifth season of the SEHA (South East Handball Association) League and second under the sponsorship of the Russian oil and gas company Gazprom. Ten teams from seven countries (Bosnia and Herzegovina, Croatia, Macedonia, Hungary, Slovakia, Serbia and Belarus) will participate in this year's competition.

MVM Veszprém are the defending champions. The SEHA League consists of two phases – the first has 18 rounds in which all teams play one home and one away game against each other. After that the four best ranked clubs play the Final Four. The campaign began on 1 September 2015 with the match between the defending champions Veszprém and last year's runner-up Meshkov Brest. The regular season will end on 13 March 2016, while the Final Four tournament will be held in Varaždin from 1 to 3 April 2016.

== Team information ==
=== Venues and locations ===
Country	Team	City	Venue (Capacity)
Belarus	Meshkov Brest	Brest, Belarus	Universal Sports Complex Victoria (3,740)
Bosnia and Herzegovina	Borac m:tel	Banja Luka	Sportska dvorana Borik (3,500)
Croatia	PPD Zagreb	Zagreb	Arena Zagreb (16,800)
Croatia	Nexe	Našice	Sportska dvorana (2,500)
Hungary	Veszprém	Veszprém	Veszprém Aréna (5,096)
(North Macedonia) Macedonia	Vardar	Skopje	Jane Sandanski Arena (6,000)
(North Macedonia) Macedonia	Maks Strumica	Strumica	Sportska Sala Park (4,000)
Serbia	Vojvodina	Novi Sad	Hala Slana Bara (4,000)
Serbia	Spartak Vojput	Subotica	Hala sportova u Subotici (3,000)
Slovakia	Tatran Prešov	Prešov	City Hall Prešov (4,000)

== Regular season ==
=== Standings ===
	Team	Pld	W	D	L	GF	GA	Diff	Pts	Note
1	(Hungary) Veszprém	18	16	2	0	628	418	210	50	Advance to Final Four
2	(North Macedonia) Vardar	18	14	2	2	603	491	112	44	Advance to Final Four
3	(Croatia) PPD Zagreb	18	14	0	4	570	453	117	42	Advance to Final Four
4	(Belarus) Meshkov Brest	18	12	0	6	567	481	86	36	Advance to Final Four
5	(Slovakia) Tatran Prešov	18	9	1	8	546	492	54	28	
6	(Croatia) Nexe	18	8	1	9	497	502	-5	25	
7	(Serbia) Vojvodina	18	4	3	11	471	574	-103	15	
8	(Bosnia and Herzegovina) Borac m:tel	18	3	2	13	461	577	-116	11	
9	(Serbia) Spartak Vojput	18	3	1	14	461	583	-122	10	
10	(North Macedonia) Maks Strumica	18	0	2	16	389	622	-233	2	

=== Results ===
In the table below the home teams are listed on the left and the away teams along the top.

	(Bosnia and Herzegovina) BOR	(North Macedonia) VAR	(Hungary) VES	(Serbia) VOJ	(North Macedonia) MAK	(Belarus) MES	(Croatia) NEX	(Croatia) PPD	(Serbia) SPA	(Slovakia) TAT
(Bosnia and Herzegovina) Borac m:tel	—	31−42	20−34	21−30	26−21	34−42	27−27	21−35	28−24	24−23
(North Macedonia) Vardar	39−27	—	30−30	37−27	42−27	27−28	31−28	33−24	36−18	39−32
(Hungary) Veszprém	32−25	24−24	—	44−21	50−16	31−24	39−21	38−27	36−29	39−31
(Serbia) Vojvodina	37−29	26−31	22−42	—	30−25	22−32	24−26	28−44	27−27	26−26
(North Macedonia) Maks Strumica	30−30	26−35	23−37	25−25	—	22−41	20−30	21−40	23−31	24−31
(Belarus) Meshkov Brest	42−18	30−32	25−37	31−22	39−20	—	31−26	21−24	40−28	23−31
(Croatia) Nexe	30−25	29−36	21−35	32−27	23−17	28−31	—	27−28	32−22	31−32
(Croatia) PPD Zagreb	30−20	30−25	19−23	46−29	42−13	28−24	25−23	—	36−22	34−26
(Serbia) Spartak Vojput	32−29	27−36	15−31	25−28	26−18	28−35	26−32	29−35	—	29−39
(Slovakia) Tatran Prešov	27−26	27−28	25−26	31−20	44−18	23−28	26−31	30−23	42−23	—

== Final four ==
The final four was held at the Varaždin Arena, in Varaždin, Croatia on 1 and 3 April 2016.

== Format ==
The first-placed team of the group faces the fourth-placed team, and the second-placed team will play against the third-placed team from the other group in the final four.

=== Semifinals ===
1 April 2016
18:00 CEST (UTC+02:00)
MVM Veszprém (Hungary)
24−21
(Belarus) Meshkov Brest
Varaždin Arena, Varaždin
Attendance: 4,358
Referees: Gubica, Milošević (CRO)
Nagy, Ugalde 5
(6−11)
four players 4
3× (yellow card) 5× (suspension)
Report
3× (yellow card) 4× (suspension)

FT: 20−20 Pen: 4–1

1 April 2016; 20:30 CEST (UTC+02:00)	Vardar (North Macedonia)	26−24	(Croatia) Zagreb	Varaždin Arena, Varaždin; Attendance: 5,347; Referees: Brunovsky, Canda (SVK)
1 April 2016; 20:30 CEST (UTC+02:00)	Manaskov 6	(12−10)	Horvat 6	Varaždin Arena, Varaždin; Attendance: 5,347; Referees: Brunovsky, Canda (SVK)
1 April 2016; 20:30 CEST (UTC+02:00)	3× (yellow card) 7× (suspension)	Report	2× (yellow card) 5× (suspension)	Varaždin Arena, Varaždin; Attendance: 5,347; Referees: Brunovsky, Canda (SVK)

=== Match for third place ===
3 April 2016; 16:30 CEST (UTC+02:00)	Meshkov Brest (Belarus)	23−24	(Croatia) Zagreb	Varaždin Arena, Varaždin; Attendance: 5,420; Referees: Nachevski, Nikolov (MKD)
3 April 2016; 16:30 CEST (UTC+02:00)	Stojković 6	(9−11)	Horvat 8	Varaždin Arena, Varaždin; Attendance: 5,420; Referees: Nachevski, Nikolov (MKD)
3 April 2016; 16:30 CEST (UTC+02:00)	4× (yellow card) 6× (suspension)	Report	4× (yellow card) 2× (suspension)	Varaždin Arena, Varaždin; Attendance: 5,420; Referees: Nachevski, Nikolov (MKD)

=== Final ===
3 April 2016; 19:00 CEST (UTC+02:00)	MVM Veszprém (Hungary)	28−26	(North Macedonia) Vardar	Varaždin Arena, Varaždin; Attendance: 5,486; Referees: Nikolić, Stojković (SRB)
3 April 2016; 19:00 CEST (UTC+02:00)	Ilić 7	(14−15)	Cindrić 5	Varaždin Arena, Varaždin; Attendance: 5,486; Referees: Nikolić, Stojković (SRB)
3 April 2016; 19:00 CEST (UTC+02:00)	3× (yellow card) 7× (suspension)	Report	3× (yellow card) 5× (suspension) 1× (red card)	Varaždin Arena, Varaždin; Attendance: 5,486; Referees: Nikolić, Stojković (SRB)
