= 2012–13 SEHA League =

2012-13 SEHA League season
- League: SEHA League
- Sport: Handball
- Duration: 12 September 2012 – 2013
- Teams: Bosnia and Herzegovina (3 teams); Croatia (2 teams); Macedonia (2 teams); Montenegro (1 team); Slovakia (1 team); Belarus (1 team)

Regular season
- Season champions: (Belarus) Meshkov Brest

Final Four
- Finals champions: (Croatia) Zagreb CO
- Runners-up: (North Macedonia) Vardar

SEHA League seasons
- 2011–12 2013–14

The 2012–13 season is the 2nd season of the SEHA League and 10 teams from Bosnia and Herzegovina, Croatia, Macedonia, Montenegro, Slovakia and Belarus participate in it.

== Team information ==
=== Venues and locations ===
Country	Teams	Team	City	Venue (Capacity)
Belarus	1			
Belarus	1	Meshkov Brest	Brest	Universal Sports Complex Victoria (3,740)
Bosnia and Herzegovina	3			
Bosnia and Herzegovina	3	Izviđač	Ljubuški	Gradska sportska dvorana Ljubuški (4,000)
Bosnia and Herzegovina	3	Borac	Banja Luka	Sportska dvorana Borik (3,500)
Bosnia and Herzegovina	3	Sloga	Doboj	Dvorana srednjoškolskog centra Doboj (700)
Croatia	2			
Croatia	2	Zagreb	Zagreb	Arena Zagreb (15,000)
Croatia	2	Nexe	Našice	Sportska dvorana kralja Tomislava (2,500)
Montenegro	1			
Montenegro	1	Lovćen	Cetinje	Sala RK Lovćen (1,800)
(North Macedonia) Macedonia	2			
(North Macedonia) Macedonia	2	Vardar	Skopje	SRC Kale (2,500)
(North Macedonia) Macedonia	2	Metalurg	Skopje	Avtokomanda (2,000)
Slovakia	1			
Slovakia	1	Tatran	Prešov	City Hall Prešov (4,000)

== Regular season ==
=== Standings ===
	Team	Pld	W	D	L	GF	GA	Diff	Pts
1	(Belarus) Meshkov Brest	18	13	1	4	568	518	+50	40
2	(North Macedonia) Metalurg	18	13	0	5	471	397	+74	39
3	(North Macedonia) Vardar PRO	18	11	3	4	540	462	+78	36
4	(Croatia) Zagreb	18	11	2	5	516	457	+59	35
5	(Slovakia) Tatran Prešov	18	11	2	5	513	471	+42	35
6	(Montenegro) Lovćen	18	9	2	7	497	523	–26	29
7	(Croatia) Nexe Našice	18	8	1	9	501	502	-1	25
8	(Bosnia and Herzegovina) Borac Banja Luka	18	3	2	13	439	530	–91	11
9	(Bosnia and Herzegovina) Izviđač	18	3	0	15	417	498	–81	9
10	(Bosnia and Herzegovina) Sloga	18	1	1	16	449	553	–104	4

Qualified for Final four

Pld - Played; W - Won; L - Lost; PF - Points for; PA - Points against; Diff - Difference; Pts - Points.

As of 17 February 2013

=== Results ===
In the table below the home teams are listed on the left and the away teams along the top.

	(Bosnia and Herzegovina) BOR	(Bosnia and Herzegovina) IZV	(Montenegro) LOV	(North Macedonia) MET	(Belarus) MES	(Croatia) NEX	(Bosnia and Herzegovina) SLO	(Slovakia) TAT	(North Macedonia) VAR	(Croatia) ZAG
(Bosnia and Herzegovina) Borac Banja Luka		21–20	28–28	20–30	28–33	19–20	26–25	30-36	22-28	26–35
(Bosnia and Herzegovina) Izviđač	22-29		31–27	19-27	27–31	30–23	33–26	28–31	21-34	29–31
(Montenegro) Lovćen	31–27	24–22		22-24	29–29	28–27	33-30	30–29	23–21	30-28
(North Macedonia) Metalurg	31–19	28–18	32–19		28-26	29–30	28-18	30–19	26-21	33–26
(Belarus) Meshkov Brest	33–26	34–28	33-30	28-26		30-25	38-28	34–29	30–27	30–25
(Croatia) Nexe Našice	33–25	27-25	29–30	27–28	36–27		27–25	28–25	27–27	18-28
(Bosnia and Herzegovina) Sloga	25-25	29-18	29–33	23–26	23–37	26–32		29-31	27–35	21–27
(Slovakia) Tatran Prešov	29–22	10-0	36-29	10–0*	40–36	40-36	33–26		28-28	26–26
(North Macedonia) Vardar PRO	36–25	41–23	38-29	27–26	34–27	27-25	36–22	29–33		26–23
(Croatia) CO Zagreb	35-21	25–23	30–22	25-19	29-32	33–31	35–17	30–28	25–25	

== Final four ==
=== Semifinals ===
12 April 2013; 17:00	Meshkov (Belarus)	29 – 31	(Croatia) CO Zagreb	Boris Trajkovski Sports Center, Skopje; Attendance: 1,100; Referees: Nachevski, Nikolov (MKD)
12 April 2013; 17:00		(17–16)		Boris Trajkovski Sports Center, Skopje; Attendance: 1,100; Referees: Nachevski, Nikolov (MKD)

12 April 2013; 19:00	Metalurg (North Macedonia)	21 – 22	(North Macedonia) Vardar PRO	Boris Trajkovski Sports Center, Skopje; Attendance: 5,350; Referees: Gubica, Milošević (CRO)
12 April 2013; 19:00		(9–12)		Boris Trajkovski Sports Center, Skopje; Attendance: 5,350; Referees: Gubica, Milošević (CRO)

=== Match for third place ===
13 April 2013; 17:00	Meshkov (Belarus)	21 – 26	(North Macedonia) Metalurg	Boris Trajkovski Sports Center, Skopje; Attendance: 1,500; Referees: A. Konjičanin, D. Konjičanin (BIH)
13 April 2013; 17:00		(8–13)		Boris Trajkovski Sports Center, Skopje; Attendance: 1,500; Referees: A. Konjičanin, D. Konjičanin (BIH)

=== Final ===
13 April 2013; 19:00	CO Zagreb (Croatia)	25 – 24	(North Macedonia) Vardar PRO	Boris Trajkovski Sports Center, Skopje; Attendance: 5,500; Referees: Gousko, Repkin (BLR)
13 April 2013; 19:00		(10–11)		Boris Trajkovski Sports Center, Skopje; Attendance: 5,500; Referees: Gousko, Repkin (BLR)
