= 2014–15 SEHA League =

2014-15 SEHA League season
- League: SEHA League
- Sport: Handball
- Duration: 27 August 2014 - 18 March 2015
- Teams: Bosnia and Herzegovina (1 team); Croatia (2 teams); Macedonia (2 teams); Hungary (1 team); Slovakia (1 team); Serbia (2 teams); Belarus (1 team)

Regular season
- Season champions: (Hungary) MKB-MVM Veszprém
- Top scorer: Radoslav Antl (125 goals)

Final Six
- Finals champions: (Hungary) MKB-MVM Veszprém
- Runners-up: (Belarus) Meshkov Brest

SEHA League seasons
- ← 2013–14 2015–16 →

The 2014–15 season is the fourth season of the SEHA League and 10 teams from Bosnia and Herzegovina, Croatia, Macedonia, Hungary, Slovakia, Serbia and Belarus.

== Team information ==
=== Venues and locations ===
Country	Team	City	Venue (Capacity)
Belarus	HC Meshkov Brest	Brest, Belarus	Universal Sports Complex Victoria (3,740)
Bosnia and Herzegovina	RK Borac Banja Luka	Banja Luka	Sportska dvorana Borik (3,500)
Croatia	RK Zagreb	Zagreb	Arena Zagreb (16,800)
Croatia	RK Nexe Našice	Našice	Sportska dvorana (2,500)
Hungary	MKB-MVM Veszprém	Veszprém	Veszprém Aréna (5,096)
(North Macedonia) Macedonia	RK Vardar	Skopje	Jane Sandanski Arena (6,000)
(North Macedonia) Macedonia	RK Metalurg Skopje	Skopje	Avtokomanda (2,000)
Serbia	RK Vojvodina	Novi Sad	Hala Slana Bara (4,000)
Serbia	RK Radnički Kragujevac	Kragujevac	Jezero Hall (3,570)
Slovakia	HT Tatran Prešov	Prešov	City Hall Prešov (4,000)

== Regular season ==
=== Standings ===
	Team	Pld	W	D	L	GF	GA	Diff	Pts
1	(Hungary) Veszprém	18	17	0	1	561	413	148	51
2	(North Macedonia) Vardar Skopje	18	15	0	3	531	462	69	45
3	(Belarus) Meshkov Brest	18	13	0	5	508	459	49	39
4	(Croatia) Zagreb	18	12	0	6	480	417	63	36
5	(Slovakia) Tatran Prešov	18	11	0	7	539	500	39	33
6	(Croatia) Nexe Našice	18	5	1	12	443	512	-69	16
7	(North Macedonia) Metalurg Skopje	18	5	1	12	397	445	-48	15
8	(Bosnia and Herzegovina) Borac Banja Luka	18	4	1	13	464	537	-73	13
9	(Serbia) Vojvodina Novi Sad	18	2	4	12	444	511	-67	10
10	(Serbia) Radnički Kragujevac	18	2	1	15	472	589	-117	7

=== Results ===
In the table below the home teams are listed on the left and the away teams along the top.

	(Bosnia and Herzegovina) BOR	(North Macedonia) VAR	(Serbia) VOJ	(Hungary) VES	(North Macedonia) MET	(Belarus) MES	(Croatia) NEX	(Croatia) ZAG	(Serbia) RAD	(Slovakia) TAT
(Bosnia and Herzegovina) Borac Banja Luka	—	22−31	25−25	29−33	27−21	31−36	30−28	24−30	34−32	37−30
(North Macedonia) Vardar Skopje	31−26	—	30−26	28−21	27−21	28−25	32−21	32−29	39−33	32−26
(Serbia) Vojvodina	27−24	21−26	—	19−32	22−25	24−35	26−26	23−28	31−23	25−29
(Hungary) Veszprém	32−18	31−23	31−26	—	33−21	31−26	36−18	27−22	40−24	37−25
(North Macedonia) Metalurg	24−17	20−26	26−26	22−27	—	17−26	23−21	20−23	35−22	34−28
(Belarus) Meshkov Brest	31−27	30−22	34−22	17−29	25−23	—	29−26	28−29	29−28	30−24
(Croatia) Nexe Našice	25−21	27−30	28−23	21−37	25−19	25−28	—	19−35	29−23	26−27
(Croatia) PPD Zagreb	30−25	25−22	29−24	21−24	10−0	21−24	32−29	—	27−18	21−25
(Serbia) Radnički Kragujevac	29−27	29−38	24−24	24−28	29−24	26−33	29−30	29−45	—	22−33
(Slovakia) Tatran Prešov	42−20	29−34	36−30	29−32	31−22	26−22	32−25	24−23	43−28	—

== Final six ==
=== Quarterfinals ===
25 March 2015; 17:45	Meshkov Brest (Belarus)	28−24	(Croatia) RK Nexe	Veszprém Aréna, Veszprém; Attendance: 1,096
25 March 2015; 17:45		(11−11)		Veszprém Aréna, Veszprém; Attendance: 1,096

25 March 2015; 20:15	PPD Zagreb (Croatia)	33−26	(Slovakia) Tatran Prešov	Veszprém Aréna, Veszprém; Attendance: 1,000
25 March 2015; 20:15		(16−10)		Veszprém Aréna, Veszprém; Attendance: 1,000

=== Semifinals ===
27 March 2015; 17:45	RK Vardar (North Macedonia)	28−32	(Belarus) Meshkov Brest	Veszprém Aréna, Veszprém; Attendance: 1,500
27 March 2015; 17:45		(11−16)		Veszprém Aréna, Veszprém; Attendance: 1,500

27 March 2015; 20:15	Veszprém (Hungary)	25−24	(Croatia) PPD Zagreb	Veszprém Aréna, Veszprém; Attendance: 4,500; Referees: Gjorgi Načevski, Slave Nikolov (MKD)
27 March 2015; 20:15		(14−10)		Veszprém Aréna, Veszprém; Attendance: 4,500; Referees: Gjorgi Načevski, Slave Nikolov (MKD)

=== Match for third place ===
29 March 2015; 15:30	RK Vardar (North Macedonia)	23−26	(Croatia) PPD Zagreb	Veszprém Aréna, Veszprém; Attendance: 3,000
29 March 2015; 15:30		(10−11)		Veszprém Aréna, Veszprém; Attendance: 3,000

=== Final ===
29 March 2015; 18:00	Meshkov Brest (Belarus)	21−32	(Hungary) Veszprém	Veszprém Aréna, Veszprém; Attendance: 5,000; Referees: Gjorgi Načevski, Slave Nikolov (MKD)
29 March 2015; 18:00		(9−14)		Veszprém Aréna, Veszprém; Attendance: 5,000; Referees: Gjorgi Načevski, Slave Nikolov (MKD)
