= Avtokomanda =

Avtokomanda Sports Hall
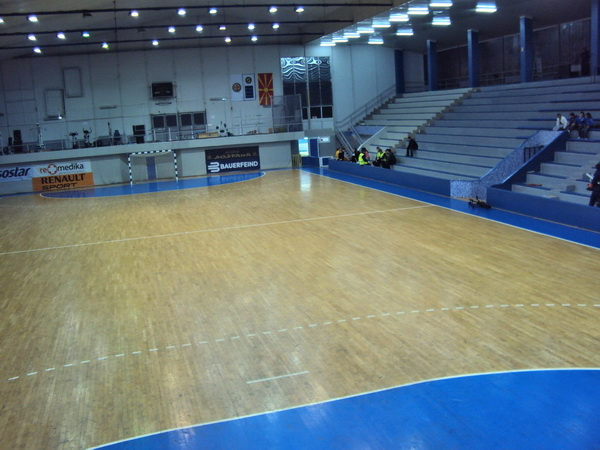
- Location: Skopje, North Macedonia
- Owner: RK Metalurg Skopje
- Capacity: 2,000

Tenants
- RK Metalurg; ŽRK Metalurg

Avtokomanda (Macedonian: Автокоманда) is an indoor sports arena located in Skopje, North Macedonia.

The arena is owned and used by handball clubs RK Metalurg and ŽRK Metalurg.
