= 2013–14 SEHA League =

2013-14 SEHA League season
- League: SEHA League
- Sport: Handball
- Duration: 5 September 2013 – 24 March 2014
- Teams: Bosnia and Herzegovina (1 team); Croatia (2 teams); Macedonia (2 teams); Montenegro (1 team); Slovakia (1 team); Serbia (2 teams); Belarus (1 team)

Regular season
- Season champions: (Slovakia) Tatran Prešov
- Top scorer: Timur Dibirov (110 goals)

Final Four
- Finals champions: (North Macedonia) Vardar
- Runners-up: (Belarus) Meshkov Brest

SEHA League seasons
- 2012–13 2014–15

The 2013–14 season is the third season of the SEHA League and 10 teams from Bosnia and Herzegovina, Croatia, Macedonia, Montenegro, Slovakia, Serbia and Belarus participate in it.

== Team information ==
=== Venues and locations ===
Country	Teams	Team	City	Venue (Capacity)
Belarus	1			
Belarus	1	Meshkov Brest	Brest	Universal Sports Complex Victoria (3,740)
Bosnia and Herzegovina	1			
Bosnia and Herzegovina	1	Borac	Banja Luka	Sportska dvorana Borik (3,500)
Croatia	2			
Croatia	2	Zagreb	Zagreb	Arena Zagreb (16,800)
Croatia	2	Našice	Našice	Sportska dvorana kralja Tomislava (2,500)
(North Macedonia) Macedonia	2			
(North Macedonia) Macedonia	2	Metalurg	Skopje	Avtokomanda (2,000)
(North Macedonia) Macedonia	2	Vardar	Skopje	SRC Kale (2.500)
Montenegro	1			
Montenegro	1	Lovćen	Cetinje	Sala RK Lovćen (2,020)
Serbia	2			
Serbia	2	Partizan	Beograd	SC Banjica (2,500)
Serbia	2	Vojvodina	Novi Sad	SC Slana Bara (4,000)
Slovakia	1			
Slovakia	1	Tatran	Prešov	City Hall Prešov (4,000)

== Regular season ==
=== Standings ===
	Team	Pld	W	D	L	GF	GA	Diff	Pts
1	(Slovakia) Tatran Prešov	18	15	0	3	605	493	+212	45
2	(Croatia) Zagreb	18	13	1	4	567	496	+71	40
3	(North Macedonia) Vardar Skopje	18	12	1	5	530	458	+72	37
4	(Belarus) Meshkov Brest	18	12	1	5	496	461	+35	37
5	(North Macedonia) Metalurg Skopje	18	8	4	6	462	441	+19	28
6	(Croatia) Nexe Našice	18	7	3	8	511	499	+12	24
7	(Serbia) Vojvodina Novi Sad	18	7	0	11	460	497	-37	21
8	(Bosnia and Herzegovina) Borac Banja Luka	18	5	0	13	428	528	–100	15
9	(Montenegro) Lovćen Cetinje	18	3	2	13	459	554	–95	11
10	(Serbia) Partizan Belgrade	18	2	0	17	430	521	–91	6

=== Results ===
In the table below the home teams are listed on the left and the away teams along the top.

	(Bosnia and Herzegovina) BOR	(North Macedonia) VAR	(Serbia) VOJ	(Croatia) ZAG	(Montenegro) LOV	(North Macedonia) MET	(Belarus) MES	(Croatia) NEX	(Serbia) PAR	(Slovakia) TAT
(Bosnia and Herzegovina) Borac Banja Luka	XXX	20:26	28:27	24:25	26:33	22:26	24:32	31:27	26:21	27:29
(North Macedonia) Vardar PRO	28:24	XXX	23:25	33:24	36:19	21:22	29:24	29:27	33:26	34:37
(Serbia) Vojvodina	22:26	21:30	XXX	27:29	30:23	24:30	24:31	28:24	21:20	24:25
(Croatia) CO Zagreb	44:20	30:29	40:29	XXX	38:27	25:29	26:20	37:30	36:24	42:34
(Montenegro) Lovćen	27:23	22:42	25:28	34:35	XXX	23:29	24:30	24:33	31:28	22:39
(North Macedonia) Metalurg	36:18	28:28	29:27	27:27	19:19	XXX	25:26	24:24	26:21	23:32
(Belarus) Meshkov Brest	31:27	23:27	32:23	21:19	34:28	27:24	XXX	26:20	33:28	28:30
(Croatia) Nexe Našice	33:19	32:25	22:29	27:31	26:26	27:23	29:29	XXX	29:18	34:32
(Serbia) Partizan	20:22	27:28	23:25	30:31	26:23	23:22	23:27	25:30	XXX	28:32
(Slovakia) Tatran Prešov	41:21	27:29	37:26	31:28	32:29	27:20	31:22	43:37	46:19	XXX

== Final four ==
=== Semifinals ===
11 April 2014; 18:00	CO Zagreb (Croatia)	22 : 30	(North Macedonia) Vardar	SPENS, Novi Sad; Attendance: 2500; Referees: Ivan Mošorinski, Aleksandar Pandžić (SRB)
11 April 2014; 18:00		(10 : 12)		SPENS, Novi Sad; Attendance: 2500; Referees: Ivan Mošorinski, Aleksandar Pandžić (SRB)

11 April 2014; 20:30	Tatran Prešov (Slovakia)	30 : 31	(Belarus) Meshkov Brest	SPENS, Novi Sad; Attendance: 4150; Referees: Nenad Nikolić, Dušan Stojković (SRB)
11 April 2014; 20:30		(16 : 14)		SPENS, Novi Sad; Attendance: 4150; Referees: Nenad Nikolić, Dušan Stojković (SRB)

=== Match for third place ===
13 April 2014; 16:00	Tatran Prešov (Slovakia)	28 : 36	(Croatia) CO Zagreb	SPENS, Novi Sad; Attendance: 3900; Referees: Gjorgi Načevski, Slave Nikolov (MKD)
13 April 2014; 16:00		(12 : 18)		SPENS, Novi Sad; Attendance: 3900; Referees: Gjorgi Načevski, Slave Nikolov (MKD)

=== Finals ===
13 April 2014; 18:30	Vardar (North Macedonia)	29 : 27	(Belarus) Meshkov Brest	SPENS, Novi Sad; Attendance: 5160; Referees: Matija Gubica, Boris Milošević (CRO)
13 April 2014; 18:30		(14 : 15)		SPENS, Novi Sad; Attendance: 5160; Referees: Matija Gubica, Boris Milošević (CRO)
