= SRC Kale =

Coordinates: 42.0029°N 21.4313°E

Kale Sports Hall
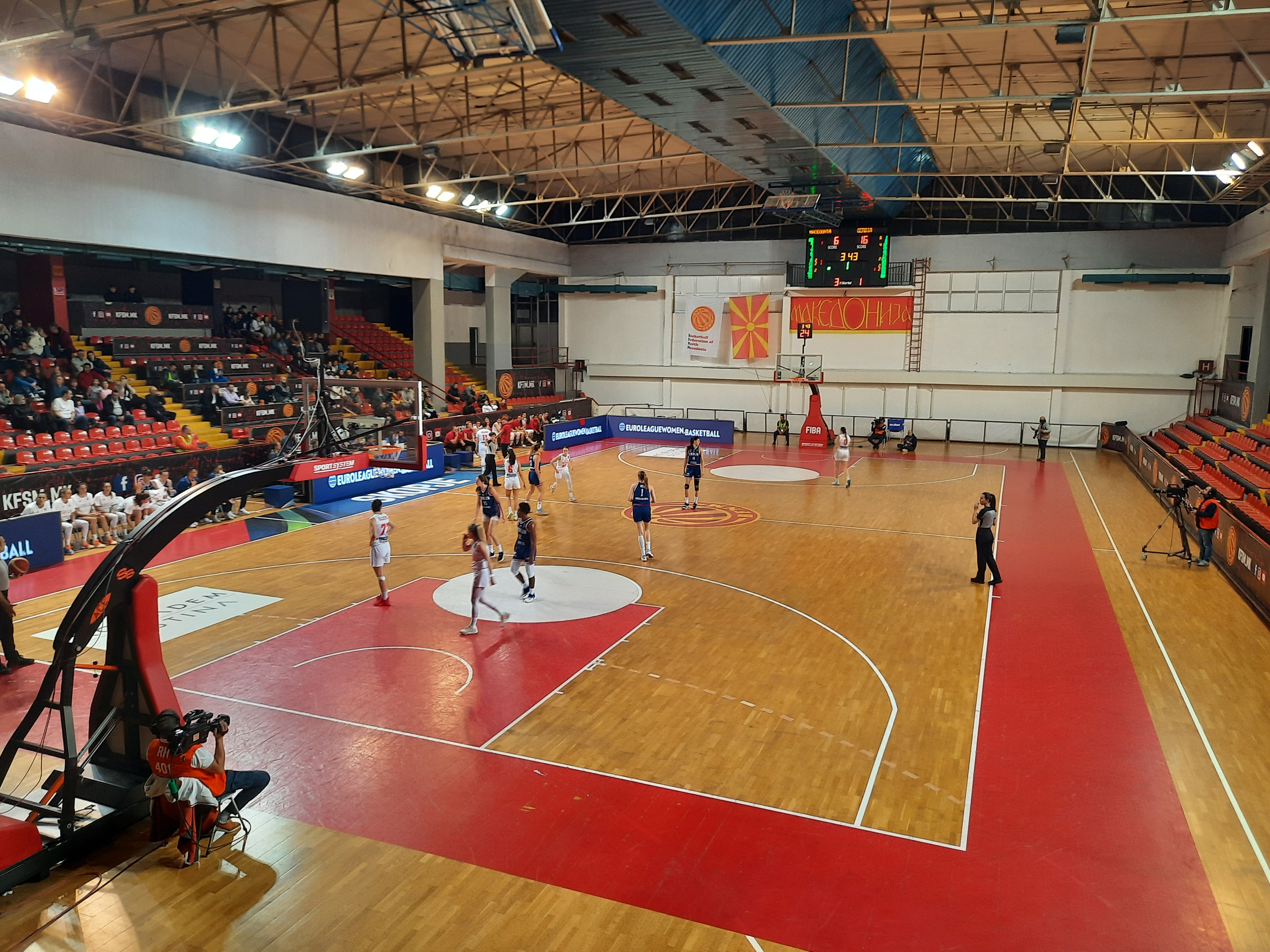
- Location: Skopje, North Macedonia
- Owner: Basketball Federation of North Macedonia
- Capacity: 2,250
- Opened: 1998

Tenants
- KK Rabotnički; KK Vardar

SRC Kale (Macedonian "Спортско рекреативен центар Кале"-Sports and Recreation Center) is a multi-functional indoor sports arena. "Kale" means "Fortress Citadel", named after the Skopje's Fortress, located right next to the hall. The capacity of the hall is 2,250 spectators. It is also known as the "Macedonian handball fortress". It is mainly used for handball, although it is also suitable for matches in boxing, wrestling, basketball, and volleyball, as well as for music concerts.

== Important matches played in SRC Kale ==
- 1975 Men's European Volleyball Championship
- Finals in the Women's EHF Champions League - Kometal Gjorce Petrov (2000 - Hypo, 2002 - Herz, 2005 - Slagelse)
- Women Handball Super Cup - 2002
- Women's Junior Handball World Championship - 2003
- Men's Junior Handball Championship - 2007
- Women's Junior Handball Championship - 2008
