= SEHA League =

Handball league in Southeast Europe

SEHA Liga
- Sport: Handball
- Founded: 2011; 15 years ago
- Folded: 2023 (inactive)
- No. of teams: (varied by season)
- Country: Croatia; Hungary; North Macedonia; Serbia; Slovakia; Belarus; Bosnia and Herzegovina; China; Montenegro; Romania; Russia; Slovenia; Ukraine
- Confederation: EHF
- Most titles: (Hungary) Telekom Veszprém (North Macedonia) Vardar 1961 (5 titles each)

The South East Handball Association League, or simply the SEHA League, was a regional men's club handball league in Southeast Europe, featuring teams from Croatia, Hungary, North Macedonia, Serbia and Slovakia in its final West season. Due to sponsorship reasons, the league was also known as the Gazprom League (or the Gazprom South Stream League earlier). The league exists alongside scaled-down national leagues of the participating nations and all of SEHA League teams join their respective country's own competitions in late spring after the SEHA League regular season and post-season have been completed. 2011–12 was the first season of the competition, with Vardar from Skopje becoming the first champions.

== History of the league ==
The initiative for establishing the regional South-East European handball league was presented during the first half of 2011. After the idea of forming a Regional Sparkasse League failed, during July 2011 it was agreed that the first season of the SEHA League would start in September of the same year. In the first season of SEHA League, 12 clubs took part, but their number reduced during the following years. In the 2020–21 season, there are 10 clubs from 7 countries.

The league is based on a regular season and the Final Four, in which the four best placed clubs from the regular season participate. The most successful participants of the SEHA League during its first eight seasons is Vardar with five titles. Vardar became the first team with more than one title when it won the 2013–14 edition.

During the 2021–22, season was interrupted after Russian invasion of Ukraine, which led Motor Zaporizhzhia left the league, and Meshkov Brest being suspended. Siniša Ostoić, managing director, confirmed that the next season will not include teams from Belarus and Ukraine. Also, European Handball Federation suspended both Russia and Belarus, meaning they are not able to play any competitive game with other EHF members. The following season these clubs founded its own Eastern Division. Season 2022–23 was abandoned after six of eight played games in quarterfinals, with the last game being played on 12 April 2023 between Telekom Veszprém and Partizan.

On 12 May 2023, SEHA YouTube account was hacked by report given on official web page. In the 2022–23 season, several Russian and Belarusian clubs formed their own Eastern Division, operating independently of the original league.

== Final Four tournaments ==
=== Results by season ===
Below is the list of winners, finalists and other participants of the Final Four SEHA tournaments.

Year	Host	Final			Match for third place		
Year	Host	Champion	Score	Second Place	Third Place	Score	Fourth Place
2011–12; Details	Zagreb	(North Macedonia); Vardar	21–18	(North Macedonia); Metalurg	(Croatia); Zagreb	31–29	(Slovakia); Tatran Prešov
2012–13; Details	Skopje	(Croatia); Zagreb	25–24 a.e.t.	(North Macedonia); Vardar	(North Macedonia); Metalurg	26–21	(Belarus); Meshkov Brest
2013–14; Details	Novi Sad	(North Macedonia); Vardar	29–27	(Belarus); Meshkov	(Croatia); Zagreb	36–28	(Slovakia); Tatran
2014–15; Details	Veszprém	(Hungary); Veszprém	32–21	(Belarus); Meshkov	(Croatia); Zagreb	26–23	(North Macedonia); Vardar
2015–16; Details	Varaždin	(Hungary); Veszprém	28–26	(North Macedonia); Vardar	(Croatia); PPD Zagreb	24−23	(Belarus); Meshkov Brest
2016–17; Details	Brest	(North Macedonia); Vardar	26–21	(Hungary); Veszprém	(Belarus); Meshkov Brest	23−19	(Croatia); PPD Zagreb
2017–18; Details	Skopje	(North Macedonia); Vardar	26–24	(Croatia); PPD Zagreb	(Slovenia); Celje	31–28	(Belarus); Meshkov Brest
2018–19; Details	Brest	(North Macedonia); Vardar	26–23	(Croatia); PPD Zagreb	(Belarus); Meshkov Brest	24–19	(Croatia); Nexe
2019–20; Details	Zadar	(Hungary); Telekom Veszprém	35–27	(North Macedonia); Vardar	(Belarus); Meshkov Brest	29–24	(Croatia); PPD Zagreb
2020–21; Details	Zadar	(Hungary); Telekom Veszprém	27–27 (pen. 4–2)	(Croatia); PPD Zagreb	(Ukraine); Motor Zaporizhzhia	31–20	(Belarus); Meshkov Brest
2021–22; Details	Zadar	(Hungary); Telekom Veszprém	32–30	(Croatia); PPD Zagreb	(North Macedonia); Eurofarm Pelister	27–23	(Croatia); Nexe
2022–23; Details	League canceled during the quarterfinals						

=== Hosts ===
Year	Final four host	Hall	Date	Attendance	Final (att.)
2011–12	(Croatia) Zagreb	Arena Zagreb	14–15 April 2012	5,500	1,500
2012–13	(North Macedonia) Skopje	Boris Trajkovski Sports Center	12–13 April 2013	13,450	5,500
2013–14	(Serbia) Novi Sad	SPC Vojvodina	11–13 April 2014	15,710	5,160
2014–15	(Hungary) Veszprém	Veszprém Aréna	25–29 March 2015	16,100	5,000
2015–16	(Croatia) Varaždin	Varaždin Arena	1–3 April 2016	20,611	5,486
2016–17	(Belarus) Brest	Universal Sports Complex Victoria	7–9 April 2017	12,150	2,750
2017–18	(North Macedonia) Skopje	Jane Sandanski Arena	13–15 April 2018	16,650	6,000
2018–19	(Belarus) Brest	Universal Sports Complex Victoria	2–3 April 2019	11,135	3,210
2019–20	(Croatia) Zadar	Krešimir Ćosić Hall	4–6 September 2020	2,000	500
2020–21	(Croatia) Zadar	Krešimir Ćosić Hall	3–5 September 2021		
2021–22	(Croatia) Zadar	Krešimir Ćosić Hall	2–4 September 2022		

== Records and statistics ==
=== By club ===
Club	Won	Runner-up	Years won	Years runner-up
(North Macedonia) Vardar	5	3	2012, 2014, 2017, 2018, 2019	2013, 2016, 2020
(Hungary) Veszprém	5	1	2015, 2016, 2020, 2021, 2022	2017
(Croatia) Zagreb	1	4	2013	2018, 2019, 2021, 2022
(Belarus) Meshkov	0	2		2014, 2015
(North Macedonia) Metalurg	0	1		2012
Total	11	11		

=== By country ===
Club / Nation	Won	Runner-up	Finals
North Macedonia	5	4	9
Hungary	5	1	6
Croatia	1	4	5
Belarus	0	2	2
Total	11	11	22

=== Participating clubs ===
Bold indicates the winning years.

Club	Seasons	Years
(North Macedonia) Vardar 1961	12	**2012**, 2013, **2014**, 2015, 2016, **2017**, **2018**, **2019**, 2020, 2021, 2022, 2023
(Croatia) PPD Zagreb	12	2012, **2013**, 2014, 2015, 2016, 2017, 2018, 2019, 2020, 2021, 2022, 2023
(Slovakia) Tatran Prešov	12	2012, 2013, 2014, 2015, 2016, 2017, 2018, 2019, 2020, 2021, 2022, 2023
(Croatia) Nexe Našice	12	2012, 2013, 2014, 2015, 2016, 2017, 2018, 2019, 2020, 2021, 2022, 2023
(Belarus) Meshkov Brest	10	2013, 2014, 2015, 2016, 2017, 2018, 2019, 2020, 2021, 2022
(Serbia) RK Vojvodina	9	2014, 2015, 2016, 2018, 2019, 2020, 2021, 2022, 2023
(North Macedonia) RK Metalurg Skopje	7	2012, 2013, 2014, 2015, 2017, 2018, 2019
(Hungary) Telekom Veszprém	7	**2015**, **2016**, 2017, **2020**, **2021**, **2022**, 2023
(Bosnia and Herzegovina) Borac	5	2012, 2013, 2014, 2015, 2016
(Bosnia and Herzegovina) Izviđač	4	2012, 2013, 2017, 2019
(North Macedonia) RK Eurofarm Pelister	4	2020, 2021, 2022, 2023
(Montenegro) Lovćen	3	2012, 2013, 2014
(Serbia) Metaloplastika	3	2012, 2020, 2021
(Serbia) Partizan	3	2014, 2022, 2023
(Slovenia) Celje	2	2017, 2018
(Slovenia) Gorenje	2	2017, 2018
(Ukraine) Motor Zaporizhzhia	2	2020, 2021
(Russia) Spartak Moscow / CSKA Moscow	2	2020
(Bosnia and Herzegovina) Bosna	1	2012
(Serbia) Crvena zvezda	1	2012
(Montenegro) Sutjeska	1	2012
(Bosnia and Herzegovina) Sloga	1	2013
(Serbia) Radnički	1	2015
(North Macedonia) Maks Strumica	1	2016
(Serbia) Spartak Vojput	1	2016
(Serbia) Dinamo Pančevo	1	2018
(Romania) CSA Steaua București	1	2019
(Serbia) Železničar	1	2019
(China) Beijing Sport University	1	2020
