= 2016–17 Liga Națională (men's handball) =

Seasons
- 2015–16 2017–18

The 2016–17 Liga Națională was the 59th season of Romanian Handball League, the top-level men's professional handball league. The league comprises fourteen teams. Dinamo București were the defending champions.

== Teams ==
Location of teams in the Romanian Men's Handball League

Club	Ground(s)	Capacity
Adrian Petrea Reșița	Sala Polivalentă Reșița	1,669
CSM București	Sala Sporturilor Rapid București	1,500
CSM Făgăraș	Sala Colegiul National "Radu Negru" Făgăraș	150
CSM Focșani	Sala Sporturilor "Vrancea" Focșani	1,400
CSU Suceava	Sala Sporturilor Suceava	500
Dinamo București	Sala Dinamo	2,538
Dobrogea Sud Constanța	Sala Sporturilor Constanța	2,100
Dunărea Călărași	Sala Polivalentă	1,500
HC Odorheiu Secuiesc	Sala Sporturilor Odorheiu Secuiesc	1,250
HC Vaslui	Sala Sporturilor Vaslui	1,500
CSM Satu-Mare	Sala Sporturilor Satu-Mare	3,000
Politehnica Timișoara	Sala Constantin Jude	1,540
Potaissa Turda	Sala de sport "Gheorghe Bariţiu" Turda	600
Steaua București	Sala Sporturilor "Concordia"	600

== League table ==
=== Standings ===
Pos	Team	Pld	W	D	L	GF	GA	GD	Pts	Qualification or relegation
1	Dinamo București	24	19	2	3	753	653	+100	59	Qualification to Play-Off
2	Potaissa Turda	24	17	2	5	709	661	+48	53	Qualification to Play-Off
3	CSM București	24	17	1	6	683	592	+91	52	Qualification to Play-Off
4	HC Odorheiu Secuiesc	24	15	5	4	716	645	+71	50	Qualification to Play-Off
5	HC Dobrogea Constanța	24	14	2	8	679	622	+57	44	Qualification to Play-Off
6	HC Vaslui	24	12	1	11	606	639	−33	37	Qualification to Play-Off
7	Politehnica Timişoara	24	10	5	9	625	601	+24	35	Qualification to Play-Off
8	Dunărea Călărași	24	9	5	10	644	658	−14	32	Qualification to Play-Off
9	Universitatea Suceava	24	10	0	14	623	633	−10	30	Qualification to Play-Out
10	Steaua București	24	8	5	11	607	609	−2	29	Qualification to Play-Out
11	CSM Focșani	24	6	2	16	593	654	−61	20	Qualification to Play-Out
12	CSM Făgăraș	24	2	1	21	549	690	−141	7	Qualification to Play-Out
13	CSM Satu Mare	24	1	1	22	579	709	−130	4	Qualification to Play-Out
14	HC Adrian Petrea Reșița (R)	0	0	0	0	0	0	0	0 (Note: HC Adrian Petrea Reșița withdrew from the championship in the second part of the championship and all their results were canceled.)	Relegation to Divizia A

(R) Relegated

== Play-Off ==
=== Knockout phase ===
Quarter-finals
CSM București	2
HC Vaslui	0
Potaissa Turda	2
Politehnica Timișoara	1
Dinamo București	2
Dunărea Călărași	0
HC Odorheiu Secuiesc	1
Dobrogea Constanța	2

Semi-finals
CSM București	2
Potaissa Turda	1
Dinamo București	2
Dobrogea Constanța	1

Final
CSM București	0
Dinamo București	2
Third place
Potaissa Turda	2
Dobrogea Constanța	1

=== League table – positions 1–4 ===
	Team	Qualification or relegation
1	Dinamo București (C, Q)	2017–18 EHF Champions League
2	CSM București (Q)	2017–18 EHF Cup
3	Potaissa Turda (Q)	2017–18 EHF Challenge Cup
4	Dobrogea Constanța (Q)	2017–18 EHF Cup

=== League table – positions 5–8 ===
	Team
5	HC Odorheiu Secuiesc
6	Politehnica Timișoara
7	Dunărea Călărași
8	HC Vaslui

== Play-Out ==
Pos	Team	Pld	W	D	L	GF	GA	GD	Pts	Qualification or relegation
9	Steaua București	16	10	4	2	434	374	+60	34	
10	Universitatea Suceava	16	11	0	5	414	391	+23	33	
11	CSM Focșani (O)	16	9	2	5	407	382	+25	29	Relegation play-offs
12	CSM Făgăraș (O)	16	5	1	10	368	408	−40	16	Relegation play-offs
13	CSM Satu Mare (R)	16	1	1	14	379	447	−68	4	Relegation to Divizia A
14	Adrian Petrea Reșița (R)	0	0	0	0	0	0	0	0 (Note: HC Adrian Petrea Reșița withdrew from the championship.)	Relegation to Divizia A

(O) Play-off winners; (R) Relegated

== Season statistics ==
=== Number of teams by counties ===
Pos.	County (județ)	No. of teams	Team(s)
1	Bucharest (capital)	3	CSM București, Dinamo and Steaua
2	Brașov	1	CSM Făgăraș
2	Caraș-Severin	1	Adrian Petrea Reșița
2	Călărași	1	Dunărea Călăraşi
2	Cluj	1	Potaissa Turda
2	Constanța	1	HC Dobrogea Sud
2	Harghita	1	HC Odorheiu Secuiesc
2	Satu Mare	1	CSM Satu Mare
2	Suceava	1	CSU Suceava
2	Timiș	1	SCM Politehnica Timişoara
2	Vaslui	1	HC Vaslui
2	Vrancea	1	CSM Focșani

=== Top goalscorers ===
As of 30 November 2016:

Rank	Player	Team	Goals
1	(Romania) Gabriel Bujor	(Romania) HC Vaslui	94
2	(Romania) Andrei Mihalcea	(Romania) HC Odorhei	78
2	(Serbia) Dalibor Čutura	(Romania) HC Dobrogea Sud Constanța	78
2	(Serbia) Filip Marjanović	(Romania) Poli Timișoara	78
5	(France) Guillaume Saurina	(Romania) CSM București	74
6	(Russia) Vitaly Komogorov	(Romania) HC Odorhei	71
7	(Romania) Ionuț Georgescu	(Romania) CSA Steaua	70
8	(Georgia (country)) Irakli Chikovani	(Romania) AHC Dunărea Călărași	69
