= 2017–18 Liga Națională (men's handball) =

Seasons
- 2016–17 2018–19

The 2017–18 Liga Națională was the 60th season of Romanian Handball League, the top-level men's professional handball league. The league comprises 14 teams. Dinamo București were the defending champions, for the second season in a row.

== Team changes ==
=== To Liga Națională ===
Promoted from Divizia A

- Politehnica Iași
- Minaur Baia Mare

=== From Liga Națională ===
Relegated to Divizia A

- CSM Satu Mare
- Adrian Petrea Reșița

== Teams ==
Location of teams in the Romanian Men's Handball League

Club	Ground(s)	Capacity
CSM București	Sala Sporturilor "Rapid"	1,500
CSM Făgăraș	Sala Colegiul National "Radu Negru"	150
CSM Focșani	Sala Sporturilor "Vrancea"	1,400
CSU Suceava	Sala Sporturilor	500
Dinamo București	Sala Dinamo	2,538
Dobrogea Sud Constanța	Sala Sporturilor	2,100
Dunărea Călăraşi	Sala Polivalentă	1,500
Minaur Baia Mare	Sala Sporturilor "Lascăr Pană"	2,048
HC Odorheiu Secuiesc	Sala Sporturilor	1,250
HC Vaslui	Sala Sporturilor	1,500
Politehnica Iași	Sala Polivalentă	1,500
Politehnica Timișoara	Sala Constantin Jude	1,540
Potaissa Turda	Sala de sport "Gheorghe Bariţiu"	600
Steaua București	Sala Sporturilor "Concordia"	600

== League table ==
=== Standings ===
Pos	Team	Pld	W	D	L	GF	GA	GD	Pts	Qualification or relegation
1	Steaua București	26	20	1	5	696	609	+87	61	Qualification to Play-Off
2	Potaissa Turda	26	19	0	7	726	648	+78	57	Qualification to Play-Off
3	Dinamo București	26	18	2	6	736	649	+87	56	Qualification to Play-Off
4	CSM București	26	18	1	7	735	636	+99	55	Qualification to Play-Off
5	Politehnica Timișoara	26	17	2	7	683	607	+76	53	Qualification to Play-Off
6	Dobrogea Constanța	26	15	4	7	701	636	+65	49	Qualification to Play-Off
7	Dunărea Călărași	26	13	4	9	648	648	0	43	Qualification to Play-Off
8	Odorheiu Secuiesc (R)	26	10	2	14	427	482	−55	32 (Note: HC Odorheiu Secuiesc withdrew from the championship in the second part of the championship due to financial problems and lost matches by forfeit.)	Relegation to Divizia A
9	Minaur Baia Mare	26	10	1	15	642	674	−32	31	Qualification to Play-Off
10	CSU Suceava	26	7	4	15	654	676	−22	25	Qualification to Play-Out
11	CSM Focșani	26	7	3	16	601	650	−49	24	Qualification to Play-Out
12	HC Vaslui	26	7	1	18	637	730	−93	22	Qualification to Play-Out
13	CSM Făgăraș	26	5	1	20	585	676	−91	16	Qualification to Play-Out
14	Politehnica Iași (R)	26	2	2	22	573	723	−150	8 (Note: Politehnica Iași withdrew from the championship in the second part of the championship due to financial problems and lost matches by forfeit.)	Relegation to Divizia A

Updated to match(es) played on 12 April 2018. Source: FRH (in Romanian)
Rules for classification: 1st points; 2nd head-to-head points; 3rd head-to-head goal difference; 4th head-to-head goals scored; 5th head-to-head away goals scored; 6th goal difference; 7th number of goals scored
(R) Relegated

== Play-Off ==
=== Knockout phase ===
Quarter-finals
Steaua București	2
Minaur Baia Mare	0
CSM București	2
Politehnica Timișoara	1
Potaissa Turda	2
Dunărea Călărași	0
Dinamo București	2
Dobrogea Constanța	1

Semi-finals
Steaua București	2
CSM București	1
Potaissa Turda	0
Dinamo București	2

Final
Steaua București	1
Dinamo București	2
Third place
CSM București	1
Potaissa Turda	2

=== League table – positions 1–4 ===
	Team	Qualification or relegation
1	Dinamo București (C, Q)	2018–19 EHF Champions League
2	Steaua București (Q)	2018–19 EHF Cup
3	Potaissa Turda (Q)	2018–19 EHF Cup
4	CSM București (Q)	2018–19 EHF Challenge Cup

=== League table – positions 5–8 ===
	Team
5	Dobrogea Constanța
6	Politehnica Timișoara
7	Dunărea Călărași
8	Minaur Baia Mare

== Play-Out ==
Pos	Team	Pld	W	D	L	GF	GA	GD	Pts	Qualification or relegation
9	Universitatea Suceava	12	7	2	3	309	299	+10	23	
10	CSM Focșani	12	6	2	4	293	279	+14	20	
11	CSM Făgăraș (O)	12	5	0	7	296	309	−13	15	Relegation play-offs
12	HC Vaslui (O)	12	4	0	8	297	309	−12	12	Relegation play-offs
13	Politehnica Iași (R)	0	0	0	0	0	0	0	0 (Note: Politehnica Iași withdrew from the championship in the second part of the championship due to financial problems and lost matches by forfeit.)	Relegation to Divizia A
14	Odorheiu Secuiesc (R)	0	0	0	0	0	0	0	0 (Note: Odorheiu Secuiesc withdrew from the championship in the second part of the championship due to financial problems and lost matches by forfeit.)	Relegation to Divizia A

Updated to match(es) played on 19 May 2018. Source: FRH (in Romanian)
Rules for classification: 1st points; 2nd head-to-head points; 3rd head-to-head goal difference; 4th head-to-head goals scored; 5th head-to-head away goals scored; 6th goal difference; 7th number of goals scored
(O) Play-off winners; (R) Relegated

== Relegation play-offs ==
The 11th and 12th-placed teams of the Liga Națională faced the 2nd and 3rd-placed teams of the Divizia A, from both Seria A and Seria B. The first place from each play-off group promoted to Liga Națională.

=== Serie I ===
Pos	Team	Pld	W	D	L	GF	GA	GD	Pts	Promotion or qualification
1	CSM Făgăraș (P)	2	2	0	0	65	42	+23	6	Promotion to Liga Națională
2	HC Buzău (Q)	2	1	0	1	46	55	−9	3	Qualification to Third place
3	Universitatea Cluj	2	0	0	2	49	63	−14	0	

Updated to match(es) played on 2 June 2018. Source: FRH (in Romanian)
Rules for classification: 1st points; 2nd head-to-head points; 3rd head-to-head goal difference; 4th head-to-head goals scored; 5th head-to-head away goals scored; 6th goal difference; 7th number of goals scored
(P) Promoted; (Q) Qualified for the phase indicated

=== Serie II ===
Pos	Team	Pld	W	D	L	GF	GA	GD	Pts	Promotion or qualification
1	HC Vaslui (P)	1	1	0	0	44	27	+17	3	Promotion to Liga Națională
2	Atletico Alexandria (Q)	1	0	0	1	27	44	−17	0	Qualification to Third place
3	CSU Târgu Jiu	0	0	0	0	0	0	0	0 (Note: CSU Târgu Jiu withdrew from the relegation play-offs.)	

Updated to match(es) played on 31 May 2018. Source: FRH (in Romanian)
Rules for classification: 1st points; 2nd head-to-head points; 3rd head-to-head goal difference; 4th head-to-head goals scored; 5th head-to-head away goals scored; 6th goal difference; 7th number of goals scored
(P) Promoted; (Q) Qualified for the phase indicated

=== Third place ===
Because the winner of Divizia A, Seria B, CSM Oradea declined the participation in the 2018–19 Liga Națională, another play-off match was organised to establish the third place and implicitly the last team promoted. The match was played between the 2nd places from the two Relegation play-offs series.

Team 1	Score	Team 2
HC Buzău	30–27	Atletico Alexandria

Notes:

- HC Buzău qualified for 2018–19 Liga Națională and Atletico Alexandria qualified for 2018–19 Divizia A.

== Season statistics ==
=== Number of teams by counties ===
Pos.	County (județ)	No. of teams	Team(s)
1	Bucharest (capital)	3	CSM București, Dinamo and Steaua
2	Brașov	1	CSM Făgăraș
2	Călărași	1	Dunărea Călăraşi
2	Cluj	1	Potaissa Turda
2	Constanța	1	Dobrogea Constanța
2	Harghita	1	Odorheiu Secuiesc
2	Iași	1	Politehnica Iași
2	Maramureș	1	Minaur Baia Mare
2	Suceava	1	CSU Suceava
2	Timiș	1	Politehnica Timișoara
2	Vaslui	1	HC Vaslui
2	Vrancea	1	CSM Focșani
