= 2021–22 Liga Națională (men's handball) =

Handball season

Liga Națională
- Season: 2021–22
- Dates: 28 August 2021 – 22 May 2022
- Champion: Dinamo București; 18th title
- Relegated: Alexandria; Universitatea Cluj
- Champions League: Dinamo București
- European League: Minaur Baia Mare; Dobrogea Sud; Potaissa Turda; Steaua București

The 2021–22 Liga Națională (known as the Liga Zimbrilor) was the 64th season of the Liga Națională, Romanian premier handball league. It ram from 28 August 2021 to 22 May 2022.

Dinamo București won their eighteenth title.

== Teams ==
Location of teams in 2021–22 Liga Națională
Location of București teams

=== Team changes ===
Promoted from 2020–21 Divizia A	Relegated from 2020–21 Liga Națională
Alexandria; Universitatea Cluj	Făgăraș; Reșița; Botoșani; Dunărea Călărași

=== Arenas and locations ===
The following 14 clubs compete in the Liga Națională during the 2021–22 season:

Team	Location	Arena	Capacity
Alexandria	Alexandria	Sala Sporturilor	
Bacău	Bacău	Sala Sporturilor	2,000
Buzău	Buzău	Sala Sp. "Romeo Iamandi"	1,868
CSM București	București	Polyvalent Hall	5,300
Dinamo București	București	Sala Polivalentă Dinamo	2,538
Dobrogea Sud Constanța	Constanța	Sala Sporturilor	2,100
Focșani	Focșani	Sala Sporturilor "Vrancea"	1,400
Minaur Baia Mare	Baia Mare	Sala Sporturilor "Lascăr Pană"	2,048
Politehnica Timișoara	Timișoara	Sala Sporturilor „Constantin Jude”	2,000
Potaissa Turda	Turda	Sala de sport "Gheorghe Barițiu"	1,669
Steaua București	București	Sala Sporturilor Concordia; Polyvalent Hall	1,465; 5,300
Suceava	Suceava	Sala LPS	450
Universitatea Cluj	Cluj-Napoca	Sala Sporturilor "Horia Demian"	2,525
Vaslui	Vaslui	Sala Sporturilor	1,500

== League table ==
Pos	Team	Pld	W	D	L	GF	GA	GD	Pts	Qualification or relegation
1	Dinamo București (C)	26	23	1	2	840	659	+181	70	Qualification for Champions League group phase
2	Minaur Baia Mare	26	20	1	5	761	700	+61	61	Qualification for European League first qualifying round
3	Dobrogea Sud	26	19	3	4	678	574	+104	60	Qualification for European League first qualifying round
4	Potaissa Turda	26	19	1	6	798	746	+52	58	Qualification for European League first qualifying round
5	Steaua București	26	18	2	6	727	655	+72	56	Qualification for European League second qualifying round (Note: Steaua București qualified for the European League second qualifying round as the 2022 Cupa României runners-up.)
6	Focșani 2007	26	14	2	10	679	674	+5	44	
7	Buzău 2012	26	10	2	14	670	700	−30	32	
8	Vaslui	26	10	1	15	706	741	−35	31	
9	Suceava	26	9	3	14	711	712	−1	30 (Note: Suceava is ahead of CSM București on head-to-head results: 52–51.)	
10	CSM București	26	9	3	14	720	720	0	30	
11	Politehnica Timișoara	26	7	1	18	733	774	−41	22	Qualification for Relegation play-offs
12	Bacău	26	5	2	19	732	820	−88	17	Qualification for Relegation play-offs
13	Alexandria (R)	26	4	2	20	628	716	−88	14	Relegated to Divizia A
14	Universitatea Cluj (R)	26	3	0	23	665	857	−192	9	Relegated to Divizia A

Source: Romanian Handball Federation (in Romanian), Flashscore
Rules for classification: 1) points; 2) head-to-head points; 3) goal difference; 4) goals scored; 5) head-to-head goal difference; 6) head-to-head number of goals scored.
(C) Champions; (R) Relegated

== Promotion/relegation play-offs ==
The 11th and 12th-placed teams of the Liga Națională faces the 3rd and 4th-placed team of the Divizia A. The first two places promoted to Liga Națională and the last two relegated to Divizia A. The play-offs were played on neutral ground, in Ghimbav.

Pos	Team	Pld	W	D	L	GF	GA	GD	Pts	Qualification or relegation
1	Bacău (O)	3	3	0	0	94	81	+13	6	Promoted to Liga Națională
2	Politehnica Timișoara (O)	3	2	0	1	103	81	+22	4	Promoted to Liga Națională
3	Oradea (R)	3	1	0	2	74	91	−17	2	Relegated to Divizia A
4	Sighişoara (R)	3	0	0	3	71	89	−18	0	Relegated to Divizia A

Source: Romanian Handball Federation (in Romanian), Flashscore
Rules for classification: 1) points; 2) head-to-head points; 3) goal difference; 4) goals scored; 5) head-to-head goal difference; 6) head-to-head number of goals scored.
(O) Play-off winners; (R) Relegated

== See also ==
- 2022 Cupa României
- 2021–22 Divizia A
