= 2018–19 Liga Națională (men's handball) =

Seasons
- 2017–18 2019–20

The 2018–19 Liga Națională is the 61st season of Romanian Handball League, the top-level men's professional handball league. The league comprises 14 teams. Dinamo București are the defending champions, for the third season in a row.

== Team changes ==
=== To Liga Națională ===
Promoted from Divizia A

- CSM Bacău
- HC Buzău ‡
- Universitatea Cluj ‡

=== From Liga Națională ===
Relegated to Divizia A

- HC Vaslui ‡
- Politehnica Iași
- Odorheiu Secuiesc

Notes:

- ‡ HC Buzău promoted via an extra play-off match, after the winner of Divizia A, Seria B, CSM Oradea declined its participation.
- ‡ HC Vaslui withdrew from the championship and Universitatea Cluj was invited to fill the vacancy.

== Teams ==
Location of teams in the Romanian Men's Handball League

Club	Ground(s)	Capacity
CSM Bacău	Sala Sporturilor	2,000
CSM București	Sala Sporturilor "Rapid"	1,500
CSM Făgăraș	Sala Colegiul Național "Radu Negru"	150
CSM Focșani	Sala Sporturilor "Vrancea"	1,400
CSU Suceava	Sala Sporturilor	500
Dinamo București	Sala Dinamo	2,538
Dobrogea Constanța	Sala Sporturilor	2,100
Dunărea Călăraşi	Sala Polivalentă	1,500
HC Buzău	Sala Sporturilor "Romeo Iamandi"	1,868
Minaur Baia Mare	Sala Sporturilor "Lascăr Pană"	2,048
Politehnica Timișoara	Sala Constantin Jude	1,540
Potaissa Turda	Sala de sport "Gheorghe Bariţiu"	600
Steaua București	Sala Sporturilor "Concordia"	600
Universitatea Cluj	Sala Sporturilor "Horia Demian"	2,525

== League table ==
Pos	Team	Pld	W	D	L	GF	GA	GD	Pts	Qualification
1	Dobrogea Constanța	26	21	1	4	773	639	+134	64	Qualification to Play-off
2	Dinamo București	26	18	3	5	798	687	+111	57	Qualification to Play-off
3	CSM București	26	18	3	5	701	614	+87	57	Qualification to Play-off
4	Potaissa Turda	26	16	4	6	744	675	+69	52	Qualification to Play-off
5	Dunărea Călărași	26	16	3	7	727	670	+57	51	Qualification to Play-off
6	Steaua București	26	16	3	7	730	678	+52	51	Qualification to Play-off
7	Politehnica Timișoara	26	15	5	6	707	647	+60	50	Qualification to Play-off
8	Focșani	26	12	2	12	688	667	+21	38	Qualification to Play-off
9	Minaur Baia Mare	26	9	3	14	745	766	−21	30	Qualification to Play-out
10	Suceava	26	7	2	17	632	705	−73	23	Qualification to Play-out
11	Făgăraș	26	7	2	17	642	697	−55	23	Qualification to Play-out
12	Buzău	26	6	1	19	637	722	−85	19	Qualification to Play-out
13	Bacău	26	5	0	21	677	783	−106	15	Qualification to Play-out
14	Universitatea Cluj	26	0	0	26	669	920	−251	0	Qualification to Play-out

Source: Romanian Handball Federation (in Romanian)
Rules for classification: Rules for classification: 1) Points; 2) Goal difference; 3) Goals scored;

== Play-off ==
=== First round ===
The top eight teams from regular season will be distributed in two main groups consisting of four teams each. In the group the teams will meet twice (6 matches per team) and at the end, they will qualify for the knockout phase. Teams start the group phase with a certain number of points (6, 4 or 2), depending on the place occupied in the regular season.

==== Seria A ====
Pos	Team	Pld	W	D	L	GF	GA	GD	Pts	Qualification
1	Dobrogea Constanța	6	3	3	0	162	147	+15	18	Qualification to Final
2	CSM București	6	2	1	3	153	159	−6	11	Qualification to Third place
3	Dunărea Călărași	6	2	1	3	165	171	−6	9	Qualification to Fifth place
4	Politehnica Timișoara	6	2	1	3	162	165	−3	7	Qualification to Seventh place

Source: Romanian Handball Federation (in Romanian)
Rules for classification: Rules for classification: 1) Points; 2) Goal difference; 3) Goals scored;

==== Seria B ====
Pos	Team	Pld	W	D	L	GF	GA	GD	Pts	Qualification
1	Dinamo București	6	4	1	1	180	164	+16	19	Qualification to Final
2	Potaissa Turda	6	3	1	2	189	184	+5	14	Qualification to Third place
3	Steaua București	6	2	1	3	165	175	−10	9	Qualification to Fifth place
4	Focșani	6	1	1	4	155	166	−11	4	Qualification to Seventh place

Source: Romanian Handball Federation (in Romanian)
Rules for classification: Rules for classification: 1) Points; 2) Goal difference; 3) Goals scored;

=== Second round ===
The teams that played in the first round of the play-offs will also play in the second round, but for different objectives, depending on the rankings obtained in the previous round. The winners of the Seria A and Seria B groups will play in the league final, the second places will compete for the "bronze medal" and a place in the 2019–20 EHF Cup, the third places will fight for the 5th place and the last ranked teams will play against each other for the 7th place. All the finals were played in a best-of-three games format.

Seventh place
4 Poli Timișoara	33	31	36
4 Focșani	28	36	26

Fifth place
3 Dunărea Călărași	31	32
3 Steaua București	25	30

Third place
2 CSM București	24	23
2 Potaissa Turda	29	32

Final
1 Dobrogea Constanța	26	19
1 Dinamo București	33	33

=== League table – positions 1–4 ===
	Team	Qualification or relegation
1	Dinamo București	2019–20 EHF Champions League
2	Dobrogea Constanța	2019–20 EHF Cup
3	Potaissa Turda	2019–20 EHF Cup
4	CSM București	2019–20 EHF Challenge Cup

=== League table – positions 5–8 ===
	Team
5	Dunărea Călărași
6	Steaua București
7	Politehnica Timișoara
8	Focșani

== Play-out ==
The bottom six teams from regular season will meet twice (10 matches per team) to contest against relegation. Teams start the play-out round with a number of points ranging from 1 to 5, depending on the place occupied in the regular season. The winner of the Relegation round finishes 9th in the overall season standings, the second placed team - 10th, and so on, with the last placed team in the Relegation round being 14th.

Pos	Team	Pld	W	D	L	GF	GA	GD	Pts	Qualification
9	Minaur Baia Mare	10	6	1	3	283	257	+26	24	
10	Bacău	10	7	0	3	271	244	+27	22	
11	Făgăraș (O)	10	6	0	4	247	236	+11	21	Qualification to Relegation play-offs
12	Buzău (O)	10	6	0	4	269	243	+26	20	Qualification to Relegation play-offs
13	Suceava (R)	10	4	1	5	248	265	−17	17	Relegation to Divizia A
14	Universitatea Cluj (R)	10	0	0	10	232	305	−73	0	Relegation to Divizia A

Source: Romanian Handball Federation (in Romanian)
Rules for classification: Rules for classification: 1) Points; 2) Goal difference; 3) Goals scored;
(O) Play-off winners; (R) Relegated

== Promotion/relegation play-offs ==
The 11th and 12th-placed teams of the Liga Națională faced the 3rd and 4th-placed teams of the Divizia A promotion tournament. The first two places promoted to Liga Națională and the last two relegated to Divizia A. The play-offs were played on neutral ground, in Drobeta-Turnu Severin.

Pos	Team	Pld	W	D	L	GF	GA	GD	Pts	Qualification
1	Făgăraș (C, P)	3	3	0	0	99	79	+20	9	Promoted to Liga Națională
2	Buzău (P)	3	2	0	1	94	80	+14	6	Promoted to Liga Națională
3	Alexandria (R)	3	1	0	2	92	105	−13	3	Relegated to Divizia A
4	Sighișoara (R)	3	0	0	3	76	97	−21	0	Relegated to Divizia A

Source: Romanian Handball Federation (in Romanian)
Rules for classification: Rules for classification: 1) Points; 2) Goal difference; 3) Goals scored;
(C) Champions; (P) Promoted; (R) Relegated

== Season statistics ==
=== Number of teams by counties ===
Pos.	County (județ)	No. of teams	Team(s)
1	Bucharest (capital)	3	CSM București, Dinamo and Steaua
2	Cluj	2	Potaissa Turda and Universitatea Cluj
3	Bacău	1	Bacău
3	Brașov	1	Făgăraș
3	Buzău	1	Buzău
3	Călărași	1	Dunărea Călăraşi
3	Constanța	1	Dobrogea Constanța
3	Maramureș	1	Minaur Baia Mare
3	Suceava	1	Suceava
3	Timiș	1	Politehnica Timișoara
3	Vrancea	1	Focșani
