= 2019–20 Liga Națională (men's handball) =

Seasons
- ← 2018–19 2020–21 →

The 2019–20 Liga Națională is the 62nd season of Romanian Handball League, the top-level men's professional handball league. The league comprises 14 teams. Dinamo București are the defending champions.

== League table ==
Pos	Team	Pld	W	D	L	GF	GA	GD	Pts	Qualification
1	Dinamo București	21	18	1	2	664	560	+104	55	Qualification to Play-Off
2	Potaissa Turda	22	16	2	4	657	609	+48	50	Qualification to Play-Off
3	Minaur Baia Mare	23	14	1	8	642	618	+24	43	Qualification to Play-Off
4	Dobrogea Constanța	23	13	3	7	610	541	+69	42	Qualification to Play-Off
5	CSM București	23	13	3	7	618	583	+35	42	Qualification to Play-Off
6	Steaua București	23	13	2	8	651	633	+18	41	Qualification to Play-Off
7	Dunărea Călărași	23	12	1	10	605	577	+28	37	Qualification to Play-Off
8	Politehnica Timișoara	22	10	3	9	567	563	+4	33	Qualification to Play-Off
9	Focșani	23	10	1	12	542	573	−31	31	Qualification to Play-Out
10	Bacău	22	8	1	13	585	599	−14	25	Qualification to Play-Out
11	Făgăraș	23	7	1	15	575	635	−60	22	Qualification to Play-Out
12	Vaslui	23	7	0	16	592	634	−42	21	Qualification to Play-Out
13	Buzău	22	3	2	17	542	605	−63	11	Qualification to Play-Out
14	Reșița	23	3	1	19	538	658	−120	10	Qualification to Play-Out

Source: Romanian Handball Federation (in Romanian)
