= 2018–19 Divizia A (men's handball) =

Seasons
- 2017–18 2019–20

The 2018–19 Divizia A is the 61st season of the Romanian men's handball second league. A total of 24 teams contested the league, being divided in four series, Seria A (6 teams), Seria B (7 teams), Seria C (5 teams) and Seria D (6 teams). At the end of the season the first two places from each series will qualify for the Divizia A promotion play-off.

== Team changes ==
=== To Divizia A ===
Relegated from Liga Națională

- CSM Vaslui
- Odorheiu Secuiesc

=== From Divizia A ===
Promoted to Liga Națională

- CSM Bacău
- HC Buzău
- Universitatea Cluj

=== Excluded teams ===
- ADEP Satu Mare
- CNE Sighișoara
- Politehnica Iași

=== Other teams ===
- CSM Bacău, CSU Suceava and Potaissa Turda enrolled their second teams CSM II, CSU II and Potaissa II.
- CSM Ploiești, CSU Pitești and Unirea Sânnicolau Mare were enrolled in the league.
- Atletico Alexandria and HC Vaslui were renamed as CSM Alexandria and CSM Vaslui.

== Teams for 2018–19 ==
=== Seria A ===
Location of teams in the Seria A.

Club	Ground(s)	Capacity
CNOT Brașov	Sala Sporturilor "D.P. Colibași"	1,600
CSM Bacău II	Sala Sporturilor	2,000
CSM Botoșani	Sala Polivalentă "Elisabeta Lipă"	1,700
CSM Vaslui	Sala Sporturilor	1,500
CSU Galați	Sala Sporturilor "Dunărea"	1,500
CSU Suceava II	Sala Sporturilor	500

=== Seria B ===
Location of teams in the Seria B.

Club	Ground(s)	Capacity
CS Medgidia	Sala Sporturilor "Iftimie Ilisei"	750
CSM Alexandria	Sala Sporturilor "Dimitrie Ghica"	900
CSM București II	Sala Sporturilor "Rapid"	1,500
CSM Ploiești	Olimpia Sports Hall	3,500
CSU Pitești	Sala Sporturilor "Trivale"	2,000
CSU Târgoviște	Sala Sporturilor	2,000
Dobrogea II Constanța	Sala Sporturilor	2,100

=== Seria C ===
Location of teams in the Seria C.

Club	Ground(s)	Capacity
CSMȘ Reșița	Sala Polivalentă	1,669
CSU Târgu Jiu	Sala Sporturilor	1,223
CSU Timișoara	Sala "Banu Sport"	100
Unirea Sânnicolau Mare	Sala "Ioan Morar"	200
Universitatea Craiova	Sala Polivalentă	4,215

=== Seria D ===
Location of teams in the Seria D.

Club	Ground(s)	Capacity
CSM Oradea	Arena "Antonio Alexe"	2,500
HC Odorheiu Secuiesc	Sala Sporturilor	1,250
HC Sibiu	Sala Transilvania	1,850
HCM Sighișoara	Sala Sporturilor "Radu Voina"	1,100
Minaur II Baia Mare	Sala Sporturilor "Lascăr Pană"	2,048
Potaissa II Turda	Sala de sport "Gheorghe Bariţiu"	600

== League tables ==
=== Seria A ===
Pos	Team	Pld	W	D	L	GF	GA	GD	Pts	Qualification
1	Vaslui (C, Q)	20	20	0	0	731	439	+292	60	Qualification to Promotion play-offs
2	Galați (Q)	20	12	1	7	510	508	+2	37	Qualification to Promotion play-offs
3	CNOT Brașov	20	10	1	9	579	597	−18	31	
4	Suceava II	20	10	1	9	540	573	−33	31	Ineligible for promotion
5	Bacău II	20	5	0	15	542	628	−86	15	Ineligible for promotion
6	Botoșani	20	1	1	18	329	486	−157	4 (Note: Botoșani withdrew from the championship in the second part, due to financial reasons.)	Withdrew

Updated to match(es) played on 20 April 2019. Source: Romanian Handball Federation (in Romanian)
Rules for classification: Rules for classification: 1) Points; 2) Goal difference; 3) Goals scored;
(C) Champions; (Q) Qualified for the phase indicated

=== Seria B ===
Pos	Team	Pld	W	D	L	GF	GA	GD	Pts	Qualification
1	Alexandria (C, Q)	24	21	1	2	825	574	+251	64	Qualification to Promotion play-offs
2	Dobrogea II Constanța	24	16	1	7	877	740	+137	49	Ineligible for promotion
3	Medgidia (Q)	24	15	2	7	828	647	+181	47	Qualification to Promotion play-offs
4	CSM București II	24	13	1	10	803	635	+168	40	Ineligible for promotion
5	Pitești	24	12	1	11	761	671	+90	37	
6	Ploiești	24	2	0	22	660	904	−244	6	
7	Târgoviște	24	2	0	22	558	1141	−583	6	

Updated to match(es) played on 20 April 2019. Source: Romanian Handball Federation (in Romanian)
Rules for classification: Rules for classification: 1) Points; 2) Goal difference; 3) Goals scored;
(C) Champions; (Q) Qualified for the phase indicated

=== Seria C ===
Pos	Team	Pld	W	D	L	GF	GA	GD	Pts	Qualification
1	CSMȘ Reșița (C, Q)	16	16	0	0	569	406	+163	48	Qualification to Promotion play-offs
2	Universitatea Craiova (Q)	16	9	2	5	513	474	+39	29	Qualification to Promotion play-offs
3	Unirea Sânnicolau Mare	16	8	1	7	444	459	−15	25	
4	CSU Târgu Jiu	16	4	2	10	439	506	−67	14	
5	CSU Timișoara	16	0	1	15	398	518	−120	1	

Updated to match(es) played on 20 April 2019. Source: Romanian Handball Federation (in Romanian)
Rules for classification: Rules for classification: 1) Points; 2) Goal difference; 3) Goals scored;
(C) Champions; (Q) Qualified for the phase indicated

=== Seria D ===
Pos	Team	Pld	W	D	L	GF	GA	GD	Pts	Qualification
1	Sighișoara (C, Q)	20	15	0	5	590	528	+62	45	Qualification to Promotion play-offs
2	Odorheiu Secuiesc (Q)	20	12	3	5	625	543	+82	39	Qualification to Promotion play-offs
3	Oradea	20	11	0	9	576	572	+4	33	
4	Minaur II Baia Mare	20	8	4	8	589	597	−8	28	Ineligible for promotion
5	Potaissa II Turda	20	5	1	14	596	658	−62	16	Ineligible for promotion
6	Sibiu	20	4	2	14	501	579	−78	14	

Updated to match(es) played on 20 April 2019. Source: Romanian Handball Federation (in Romanian)
Rules for classification: Rules for classification: 1) Points; 2) Goal difference; 3) Goals scored;
(C) Champions; (Q) Qualified for the phase indicated

== Promotion play-offs ==
=== Semi-final tournament ===
The first two eligible teams from each series of the regular season will compete in two main group which will be played in a neutral venue. The first two ranked teams from each group of the semi-final tournament will qualify for the Final Four. The semi-final tournament was played on neutral ground, in Brașov.

==== Group 1 ====
Pos	Team	Pld	W	D	L	GF	GA	GD	Pts	Qualification
1	Vaslui (Q)	3	3	0	0	88	69	+19	9	Qualification to Final Four
2	CSMȘ Reșița (Q)	3	2	0	1	88	82	+6	6	Qualification to Final Four
3	Odorheiu Secuiesc	3	1	0	2	57	75	−18	3	
4	Medgidia	3	0	0	3	68	75	−7	0	

Source: Romanian Handball Federation (in Romanian)
Rules for classification: Rules for classification: 1) Points; 2) Goal difference; 3) Goals scored;
(Q) Qualified for the phase indicated

==== Group 2 ====
Pos	Team	Pld	W	D	L	GF	GA	GD	Pts	Qualification
1	Sighișoara (Q)	3	3	0	0	101	94	+7	9	Qualification to Final Four
2	Alexandria (Q)	3	2	0	1	104	89	+15	6	Qualification to Final Four
3	Universitatea Craiova	3	1	0	2	104	104	0	3	
4	Galați	3	0	0	3	83	105	−22	0	

Source: Romanian Handball Federation (in Romanian)
Rules for classification: Rules for classification: 1) Points; 2) Goal difference; 3) Goals scored;
(Q) Qualified for the phase indicated

=== Final Four ===
The Final Four was played on neutral ground, in Ploiești.

Semi-finals
1 Vaslui	27
2 Alexandria	23
1 Sighișoara	21
2 CSMȘ Reșița	25

Final
Vaslui	41
CSMȘ Reșița	29

Third place
Alexandria	35
Sighișoara	28

=== League table – positions 1–4 ===
	Team	Qualification or relegation
1	Vaslui (C, P)	Promotion to 2019–20 Liga Națională
2	CSMȘ Reșița (P)	Promotion to 2019–20 Liga Națională
3	Alexandria (Q)	Qualification to Promotion play-offs
4	Sighișoara (Q)	Qualification to Promotion play-offs

== Promotion/relegation play-offs ==
The 3rd and 4th-placed teams of the Divizia A promotion tournament faced the 11th and 12th-placed teams of the Liga Națională. The first two places promoted to Liga Națională and the last two relegated to Divizia A. The play-offs were played on neutral ground, in Drobeta-Turnu Severin.

Pos	Team	Pld	W	D	L	GF	GA	GD	Pts	Qualification
1	Făgăraș (C, P)	3	3	0	0	99	79	+20	9	Promoted to Liga Națională
2	Buzău (P)	3	2	0	1	94	80	+14	6	Promoted to Liga Națională
3	Alexandria (R)	3	1	0	2	92	105	−13	3	Relegated to Divizia A
4	Sighișoara (R)	3	0	0	3	76	97	−21	0	Relegated to Divizia A

Source: Romanian Handball Federation (in Romanian)
Rules for classification: Rules for classification: 1) Points; 2) Goal difference; 3) Goals scored;
(C) Champions; (P) Promoted; (R) Relegated
