= 2017–18 Divizia A (men's handball) =

Seasons
- ← 2016–17 2018–19 →

The 2017–18 Divizia A was the 60th season of the Romanian men's handball second league. A total of 21 teams contested the league, being divided in two series, Seria A (10 teams) and Seria B (11 teams). At the end of the season the first place from both series promoted to Liga Națională, the 2nd and 3rd places from both series played a promotion play-off together with 11th and 12th place from Liga Națională.

== Team changes ==
=== To Divizia A ===
Relegated from Liga Națională

- CSM Satu Mare
- Adrian Petrea Reșița

=== From Divizia A ===
Promoted to Liga Națională

- Politehnica Iași
- Minaur Baia Mare

=== Excluded teams ===
- CSM Satu Mare was dissolved at the end of the season.
- Avram Iancu Arad, Farul Constanța and LPS Piatra Neamț withdrew from the championship.

=== Enrolled teams ===
- ADEP Satu Mare and CS Medgidia enrolled in the Divizia A.

=== Renamed teams ===
- Adrian Petrea Reșița was refounded in the summer of 2017 as CSM Școlar Reșița and enrolled in the Divizia A.
- Academia Minaur Baia Mare was renamed as Minaur II Baia Mare.

=== Other teams ===
- CNOT Brașov was moved from Seria B to Seria A.

== Teams ==
=== Seria A ===
Location of teams in the Men's Divizia A (Seria A)

Club	Ground(s)	Capacity
Atletico Alexandria	Sala Sporturilor "Dimitrie Ghica"	900
CNOT Brașov	Sala Sporturilor "D.P. Colibași"	1,600
CS Medgidia	Sala Sporturilor "Iftimie Ilisei"	750
CSM Botoșani	Sala Polivalentă "Elisabeta Lipă"	1,700
CSM București II	Sala Sporturilor "Rapid"	1,500
CSU Galați	Sala Sporturilor "Dunărea"	1,500
CSU Târgoviște	Sala Sporturilor	2,000
Dobrogea II Constanța	Sala Sporturilor	2,100
HC Buzău	Sala Sporturilor "Romeo Iamandi"	1,868
Știința Municipal Bacău	Sala Sporturilor	2,000

=== Seria B ===
Location of teams in the Men's Divizia A (Seria B)

Club	Ground(s)	Capacity
ADEP Satu Mare	Arena "Ecaterina Both"	400
CNE Sighișoara	Sala Sporturilor "Radu Voina"	1,100
CSM Oradea	Arena "Antonio Alexe"	2,500
CSMȘ Reșița	Sala Polivalentă	1,669
CSU Târgu Jiu	Sala Sporturilor	1,223
CSU Timișoara	Sala "Banu Sport"	100
HC Sibiu	Sala Transilvania	1,850
HCM Sighișoara	Sala Sporturilor "Radu Voina"	1,100
Minaur II Baia Mare	Sala Sporturilor "Lascăr Pană"	2,048
Universitatea Cluj	Sala Sporturilor "Horia Demian"	2,525
Universitatea Craiova	Sala Polivalentă	4,215

== League tables ==
=== Seria A ===
Pos	Team	Pld	W	D	L	GF	GA	GD	Pts	Promotion or qualification
1	Știința Municipal Bacău (C, P)	18	18	0	0	688	415	+273	54	Promotion to Liga Națională
2	HC Buzău (Q)	18	14	1	3	541	441	+100	43	Qualification to Promotion play-offs
3	Atletico Alexandria (Q)	18	12	2	4	573	452	+121	38	Qualification to Promotion play-offs
4	CS Medgidia	18	10	2	6	540	512	+28	32	
5	Dobrogea II Constanța	18	9	2	7	573	490	+83	29	
6	CSU Galați	18	9	0	9	530	489	+41	27	
7	CNOT Brașov	18	6	1	11	556	508	+48	19	
8	CSM București II	18	5	2	11	527	490	+37	17	
9	CSU Târgoviște	18	2	0	16	358	811	−453	6	
10	CSM Botoșani	18	0	0	18	352	630	−278	−4 (Note: CSM Botoșani were deducted 4 points for a forfeit and use of a non-playable player.)	

Updated to match(es) played on 23 May 2018. Source: FRH (in Romanian)
Rules for classification: 1st points; 2nd head-to-head points; 3rd head-to-head goal difference; 4th head-to-head goals scored; 5th head-to-head away goals scored; 6th goal difference; 7th number of goals scored
(C) Champions; (P) Promoted; (Q) Qualified for the phase indicated

=== Seria B ===
Pos	Team	Pld	W	D	L	GF	GA	GD	Pts	Promotion or qualification
1	CSM Oradea (C)	20	19	0	1	685	563	+122	57 (Note: CSM Oradea won Seria B and assured its promotion to Liga Națională, but refused it due to financial reasons.)	Promotion to Liga Națională
2	CSU Târgu Jiu (Q)	20	13	0	7	680	583	+97	39	Qualification to Promotion play-offs
3	Universitatea Cluj (Q)	20	13	0	7	640	571	+69	39	Qualification to Promotion play-offs
4	Minaur II Baia Mare	20	12	1	7	604	549	+55	37	
5	HCM Sighișoara	20	11	0	9	622	606	+16	33	
6	Universitatea Craiova	20	10	1	9	633	626	+7	31	
7	CSMȘ Reșița	20	8	3	9	616	575	+41	27	
8	HC Sibiu	20	9	0	11	603	593	+10	27	
9	CSU Timișoara	20	8	1	11	574	632	−58	25	
10	CNE Sighișoara	20	3	0	17	579	666	−87	9	
11	ADEP Satu Mare	20	1	0	19	419	691	−272	0 (Note: ADEP Satu Mare were deducted 3 points for a forfeit.)	

Updated to match(es) played on 20 May 2018. Source: (in Romanian)
Rules for classification: 1st points; 2nd head-to-head points; 3rd head-to-head goal difference; 4th head-to-head goals scored; 5th head-to-head away goals scored; 6th goal difference; 7th number of goals scored
(C) Champions; (Q) Qualified for the phase indicated

== Promotion play-offs ==
The 11th and 12th-placed teams of the Liga Națională faced the 2nd and 3rd-placed teams of the Divizia A, from both Seria A and Seria B. The first place from each play-off group promoted to Liga Națională.

=== Serie I ===
Pos	Team	Pld	W	D	L	GF	GA	GD	Pts	Promotion or qualification
1	CSM Făgăraș (P)	2	2	0	0	65	42	+23	6	Promotion to Liga Națională
2	HC Buzău (Q)	2	1	0	1	46	55	−9	3	Qualification to Third place
3	Universitatea Cluj	2	0	0	2	49	63	−14	0	

Updated to match(es) played on 2 June 2018. Source: FRH (in Romanian)
Rules for classification: 1st points; 2nd head-to-head points; 3rd head-to-head goal difference; 4th head-to-head goals scored; 5th head-to-head away goals scored; 6th goal difference; 7th number of goals scored
(P) Promoted; (Q) Qualified for the phase indicated

=== Serie II ===
Pos	Team	Pld	W	D	L	GF	GA	GD	Pts	Promotion or qualification
1	HC Vaslui (P)	1	1	0	0	44	27	+17	3	Promotion to Liga Națională
2	Atletico Alexandria (Q)	1	0	0	1	27	44	−17	0	Qualification to Third place
3	CSU Târgu Jiu	0	0	0	0	0	0	0	0 (Note: CSU Târgu Jiu withdrew from the relegation play-offs.)	

Updated to match(es) played on 31 May 2018. Source: FRH (in Romanian)
Rules for classification: 1st points; 2nd head-to-head points; 3rd head-to-head goal difference; 4th head-to-head goals scored; 5th head-to-head away goals scored; 6th goal difference; 7th number of goals scored
(P) Promoted; (Q) Qualified for the phase indicated

=== Third place ===
Because the winner of Divizia A, Seria B, CSM Oradea declined the participation in the 2018–19 Liga Națională, another play-off match was organised to establish the third place and implicitly the last team promoted. The match was played between the 2nd places from the two Relegation play-offs series.

Team 1	Score	Team 2
HC Buzău	30–27	Atletico Alexandria

Notes:

- HC Buzău qualified for 2018–19 Liga Națională and Atletico Alexandria qualified for 2018–19 Divizia A.
