= 2015–16 Liga Națională (men's handball) =

Seasons
- 2014–15 2016–17

The 2015–16 Liga Națională was the 58th season of Romanian Handball League, the top-level men's professional handball league in Romania. The league comprises fourteen teams. Minaur Baia Mare were the defending champions.

== Teams ==
Location of teams in the Romanian Men's Handball League

Club	Ground(s)	Capacity
Adrian Petrea Reșița	Sala Polivalentă Reșița	1,669
CSM București	Sala Sporturilor Rapid București	1,500
CSM Focșani	Sala Sporturilor "Vrancea" Focșani	1,400
CSM Ploieşti	Sala Olimpia	3,500
Danubius Galaţi	Sala Sporturilor "Dunărea" Galați	1,500
Dinamo București	Sala Dinamo	2,538
Dunărea Călăraşi	Sala Polivalentă	1,500
Energia Târgu Jiu	Sala Sporturilor Târgu Jiu	1,500
HC Odorheiu Secuiesc	Sala Sporturilor Odorheiu Secuiesc	1,250
HC Vaslui	Sala Sporturilor Vaslui	1,500
Minaur Baia Mare	Sala Sporturilor "Lascăr Pană" Baia Mare	2,500
Politehnica Timișoara	Sala Constantin Jude	1,540
Potaissa Turda	Sala de sport "Gheorghe Bariţiu" Turda	600
Steaua București	Sala Sporturilor "Concordia"	600

== League table ==
Pos	Team	Pld	W	D	L	GF	GA	GD	Pts	Qualification
1	Dinamo București	26	21	2	3	857	736	+121	65	Qualification to Play-Off
2	CSM București	26	19	2	5	766	654	+112	59	Qualification to Play-Off
3	HC Odorheiu Secuiesc	26	17	2	7	724	683	+41	53	Qualification to Play-Off
4	Steaua București	26	16	3	7	781	714	+67	51	Qualification to Play-Off
5	Politehnica Timişoara	26	16	2	8	712	645	+67	50	Qualification to Play-Off
6	Potaissa Turda	26	15	2	9	767	735	+32	47	Qualification to Play-Off
7	Adrian Petrea Reșița	26	12	4	10	687	689	−2	40	Qualification to Play-Off
8	Dunărea Călărași	26	11	2	13	732	729	+3	35	Qualification to Play-Off
9	Minaur Baia Mare	26	10	4	12	690	701	−11	34	Qualification to Play-Out
10	HC Vaslui	26	10	2	14	753	748	+5	32	Qualification to Play-Out
11	Energia Târgu Jiu	26	10	2	14	675	676	−1	32	Qualification to Play-Out
12	CSM Ploieşti	26	5	3	18	711	756	−45	18	Qualification to Play-Out
13	CSM Focșani	26	4	1	21	649	806	−157	13	Qualification to Play-Out
14	Danubius Galaţi	26	0	1	25	632	864	−232	1	Qualification to Play-Out

== Play-Off ==
=== Knockout phase ===
Quarter-finals
Dinamo București	2
Dunărea Călărași	0
Politehnica Timișoara	2
Steaua București	1
CSM București	2
Adrian Petrea Reșița	0
HC Odorheiu Secuiesc	0
Potaissa Turda	2

Semi-finals
Dinamo București	2
Politehnica Timișoara	0
CSM București	2
Potaissa Turda	1

Final
Dinamo București	2
CSM București	1
Third place
Politehnica Timișoara	2
Potaissa Turda	0

=== League table – positions 1–4 ===
	Team	Qualification or relegation
1	Dinamo București (C)	2016–17 EHF Champions League
2	CSM București	2016–17 EHF Cup
3	Politehnica Timișoara	2016–17 EHF Cup
4	Potaissa Turda	2016–17 EHF Challenge Cup

=== League table – positions 5–8 ===
	Team
5	HC Odorheiu Secuiesc
6	Steaua București
7	Dunărea Călărași
8	Adrian Petrea Reșița

== Play-Out ==
Pos	Team	Pld	W	D	L	GF	GA	GD	Pts	Qualification or relegation
9	Minaur Baia Mare (R)	20	11	3	6	587	539	+48	36	Relegation to Divizia A
10	Energia Târgu Jiu (R)	20	11	3	6	562	522	+40	36	Relegation to Divizia A
11	HC Vaslui (O)	20	11	3	6	607	538	+69	36	Relegation play-offs
12	CSM Focșani (O)	20	10	2	8	532	557	−25	32	Relegation play-offs
13	CSM Ploieşti (R)	20	9	4	7	559	552	+7	31	Relegation to Divizia A
14	Danubius Galaţi (R)	20	0	1	19	514	653	−139	1	Relegation to Divizia A

(O) Play-off winners; (R) Relegated

== Season statistics ==
=== Number of teams by counties ===
Pos.	County (județ)	No. of teams	Teams
1	Bucharest	3	CSM București, Dinamo and Steaua
2	Caraș-Severin	1	Adrian Petrea Reșița
2	Călărași	1	Dunărea Călăraşi
2	Cluj	1	Potaissa Turda
2	Galați	1	CSU Danubius
2	Gorj	1	Energia Târgu Jiu
2	Harghita	1	HC Odorheiu Secuiesc
2	Maramureș	1	Minaur Baia Mare
2	Prahova	1	CSM Ploiești
2	Timiș	1	Politehnica Timișoara
2	Vaslui	1	HC Vaslui
2	Vrancea	1	CSM Focșani

== Romanian clubs in European competitions ==
EHF Champions League

- HC Minaur Baia Mare

Round	Club	Home	Away	Aggregate
Group Phase (Group D)	(North Macedonia) RK Metalurg	21-20	23-21	4th
Group Phase (Group D)	(Denmark) Skjern Håndbold	28-28	28-32	4th
Group Phase (Group D)	(Ukraine) Motor Zaporizhzhia	35-30	23-25	4th
Group Phase (Group D)	(Switzerland) Kadetten Schaffhausen	31-31	23-24	4th
Group Phase (Group D)	(Norway) Elverum Håndball	24-29	28-28	4th

EHF Cup

- CSM București

Round	Club	Home	Away	Aggregate
Qual. Round 2	(Austria) Bregenz Handball	28-24	22-23	50–47
Qual. Round 3	(Spain) Frigoríficos del Morrazo	31-24	29-29	60–53
Group Phase (Group D)	(France) Chambéry Savoie Handball	25-25	23-23	3rd
Group Phase (Group D)	(Spain) Helvetia Anaitasuna	27-24	22-28	3rd
Group Phase (Group D)	(Sweden) Ystads IF	27-27	28-29	3rd

- Dinamo București

Round	Club	Home	Away	Aggregate
Qual. Round 1	(Romania) Energia Târgu Jiu	38-24	24-24	62–48
Qual. Round 2	(Greece) A.C. Diomidis Argous	35-20	26-21	61–41
Qual. Round 3	(Slovenia) RK Maribor Branik	31-25	26-27	57–52
Group Phase (Group A)	(Spain) Fraikin BM. Granollers	26-27	29-28	3rd
Group Phase (Group A)	(Germany) SC Magdeburg	33-34	22-39	3rd
Group Phase (Group A)	(Denmark) Aalborg Håndbold	28-25	28-28	3rd

- Energia Târgu Jiu

Round	Club	Home	Away	Aggregate
Qual. Round 1	(Romania) Dinamo București	24-24	24-38	48–62

EHF Challenge Cup

- HC Odorheiu Secuiesc

Round	Club	Home	Away	Aggregate
Round 3	(Portugal) ABC/UMinho	24-25	22-25	46–50
