= 2014–15 Liga Națională (men's handball) =

Seasons
- ← 2013–14 2015–16 →

The 2014–15 Liga Națională was the 57th season of Romanian Handball League, the top-level men's professional handball league. The league comprises thirteen teams. CSM Oradea withdrew from Liga Națională. HCM Constanța were the defending champions, for the seventh time in a row.

== Teams ==
Location of teams in the Romanian Men's Handball League

Club	Ground(s)	Capacity
HCM Constanța	Sala Sporturilor Constanța	2,100
Știința Municipal Bacău	Sala Sporturilor Bacău	2,000
HC Odorheiu Secuiesc	Sala Sporturilor Odorheiu Secuiesc	1,250
CSU Suceava	Sala LPS Suceava	424
Potaissa Turda	Sala de sport "Gheorghe Baritiu" Turda	600
Politehnica Timișoara	Sala Constantin Jude Timișoara	1,540
CSM București	Sala Sporturilor Rapid București	1,500
Energia Târgu Jiu	Sala Sporturilor Târgu Jiu	1,500
Dinamo București	Dinamo Polyvalent Hall	2,538
Steaua București	Sala Sporturilor "Concordia" Chiajna	4,000
Minaur Baia Mare	Sala Sporturilor "Lascăr Pană" Baia Mare	2,036
HC Vaslui	Sala Sporturilor Vaslui	1,500
Dunărea Călărași	Sala Polivalentă Călăraşi	1,500
CSM Oradea	Arena "Antonio Alexe"	2,000

== League table ==
Pos	Team	Pld	W	D	L	GF	GA	GD	Pts	Qualification
1	Odorheiu Secuiesc	24	16	3	5	657	617	+40	51	Qualification to Play-Off
2	HCM Constanța	24	15	3	6	689	634	+55	48	Qualification to Play-Off
3	Minaur Baia Mare	24	15	3	6	653	604	+49	48	Qualification to Play-Off
4	Dinamo București	24	15	3	6	644	599	+45	48	Qualification to Play-Off
5	CSM București	24	13	5	6	671	632	+39	44	Qualification to Play-Off
6	Dunărea Călărași	24	14	0	10	646	624	+22	42	Qualification to Play-Off
7	Știința Municipal Bacău	24	11	5	8	613	599	+14	38	Qualification to Play-Off
8	Potaissa Turda	24	9	3	12	651	676	−25	30	Qualification to Play-Off
9	HC Vaslui	24	8	4	12	645	671	−26	28	Qualification to Play-Out
10	Politehnica Timişoara	24	7	2	15	657	661	−4	23	Qualification to Play-Out
11	Energia Târgu Jiu	24	6	0	18	587	642	−55	18	Qualification to Play-Out
12	Steaua București	24	6	1	17	619	693	−74	18 (Note: Steaua București was deducted 1 point.)	Qualification to Play-Out
13	CSU Suceava	24	3	4	17	583	663	−80	13	Qualification to Play-Out
14	CSM Oradea	0	0	0	0	0	0	0	0 (Note: CSM Oradea withdrew from the championship.)	Qualification to Play-Out

== Play-Off ==
=== Knockout phase ===
Quarter-finals
CSM București	2
HCM Constanța	1
Potaissa Turda	2
HC Odorheiu Secuiesc	0
Știința Bacău	1
Minaur Baia Mare	2
Dunărea Călărași	1
Dinamo București	2

Semi-finals
CSM București	2
Potaissa Turda	0
Minaur Baia Mare	2
Dinamo București	1

Final
CSM București	0
Minaur Baia Mare	2
Third place
Potaissa Turda	0
Dinamo București	2

=== League table – positions 1–4 ===
Pos	Team	Qualification or relegation
1	Minaur Baia Mare (C)	2015–16 EHF Champions League
2	CSM București	2015–16 EHF Cup
3	Dinamo București	2015–16 EHF Cup
4	Potaissa Turda	

=== League table – positions 5–8 ===
Pos	Team	Qualification or relegation
5	Dunărea Călărași	
6	HCM Constanța (R)	Team disbanded after season
7	Odorheiu Secuiesc	2015–16 EHF Challenge Cup
8	Știința Municipal Bacău (R)	Relegation to Divizia A

== Play-Out ==
Pos	Team	Pld	W	D	L	GF	GA	GD	Pts	Qualification or relegation
9	Politehnica Timişoara	16	11	1	4	462	410	+52	34	
10	HC Vaslui	16	10	1	5	442	425	+17	31	
11	Energia Târgu Jiu	16	6	1	9	397	420	−23	19	2015–16 EHF Cup
12	Steaua București	16	6	1	9	414	426	−12	18 (Note: Steaua București was deducted 1 point.)	
13	CSU Suceava (R)	16	4	2	10	418	452	−34	14	Relegation to Divizia A
14	CSM Oradea (R)	0	0	0	0	0	0	0	0 (Note: CSM Oradea withdrew from the championship.)	Relegation to Divizia A

(R) Relegated
