= Marko Lasica =

Montenegrin handball player (born 1988)

Personal information
- Nationality: Montenegrin
- Born: 30 April 1988 (age 38) Nikšić, SR Montenegro, Yugoslavia
- Height: 1.88 m (6 ft 2 in)

Sport
- Sport: Handball
- Position: Right wing
- Current club: Redbergslids IK
- Number: 10

Senior clubs
- Years: Team
- –: RK Sutjeska Nikšić
- 2004–2007: RK Lovćen
- 2007–2010: SD Budućnost
- 2010–2013: Balonmán Cangas
- 2013–2014: SC Pick Szeged
- 2014–2015: Anagennisi Vyrona
- 2015–2018: SCM Politehnica Timișoara
- 2018–2020: Beşiktaş
- 2020–2021: CSM Făgăraș
- 2021: RK Partizan
- 2021: Al Kuwait SC
- 2021–: Redbergslids IK
National team
| Years | Team | Apps | (Gls) |
| 2012–2023 | Montenegro | 68 | (71) |

Marko Lasica (born 30 April 1988) is a Montenegrin handball player for Redbergslids IK.

== Achievements ==
- Liga Națională:
  - Bronze Medalist: 2016
- Montenegrin League:
  - Winner: 2007, 2009, 2010
- EHF Cup:
  - Winner: 2014
