= Radu Ghiță =

Romanian handball player (born 1990)

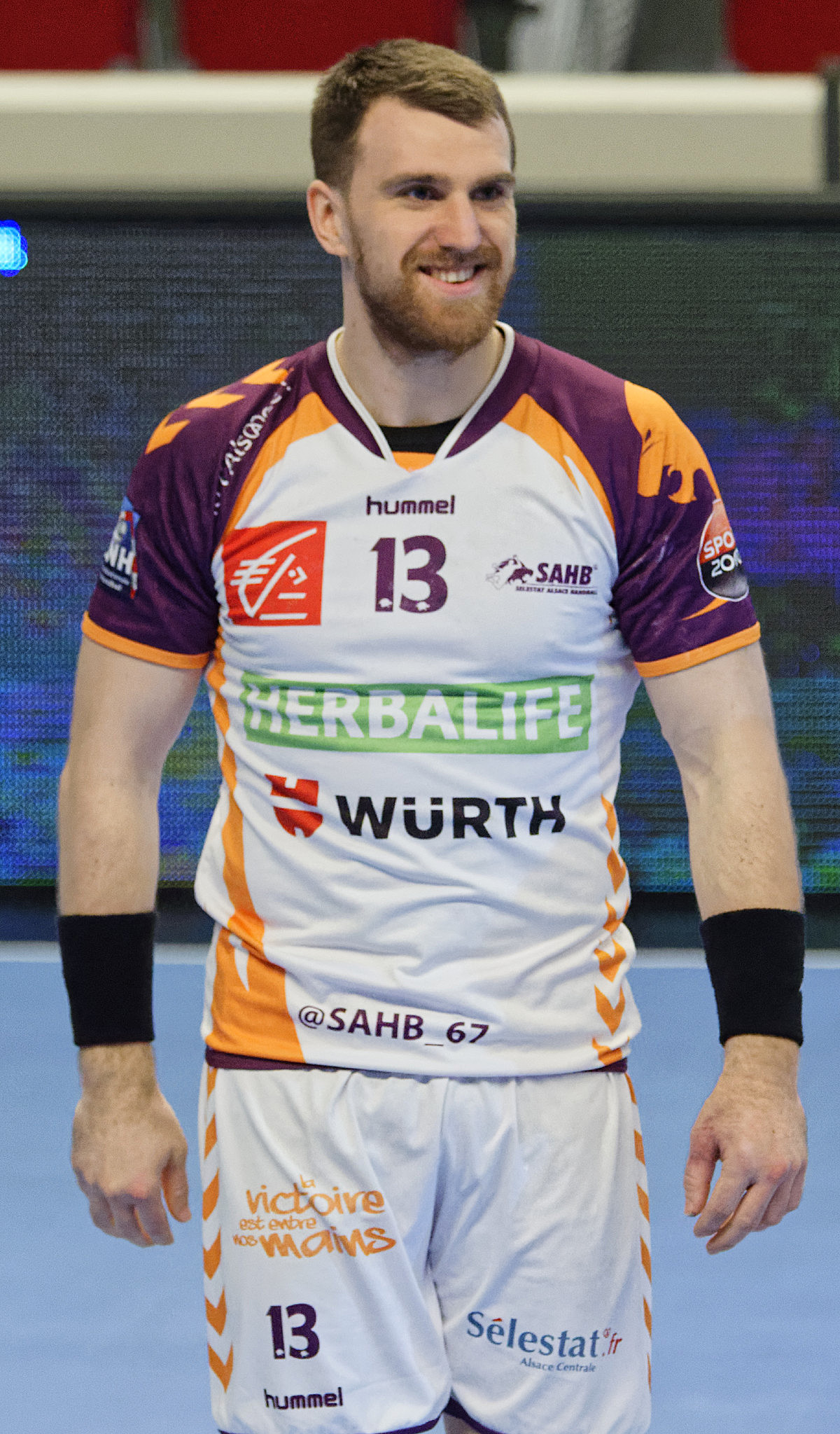
- Radu Ghiță (2015)

Personal information
- Full name: Radu Cristian Ghiță
- Nationality: Romanian
- Born: 22 November 1990 (age 35) Bacău, Romania
- Height: 1.89 m (6 ft 2 in)

Sport
- Sport: Handball
- Position: Right Back
- Current club: AHC Potaissa Turda

Youth career
- Years: Team
- –: CSȘ Bacău

Senior clubs
- Years: Team
- –2014: Știința Dedeman Bacău
- 2014-2015: Sélestat Alsace Handball
- 2015: CS Minaur Baia Mare
- 2015-2018: HC Odorhei
- 2018-: AHC Potaissa Turda
National team
Years	Team	Apps	(Gls)
–	Romania	70	(87)

Radu Cristian Ghiță (born 22 November 1990) is a Romanian handballer who plays as a right back for AHC Potaissa Turda and the Romania national team.

== Achievements ==
- Liga Națională:
  - Silver Medalist: 2012, 2013, 2014, 2020
  - Bronze Medalist: 2018, 2019,
- Cupa României:
  - Finalist: 2012, 2013, 2014
- Supercupa României:
  - Finalist: 2013
- EHF Challenge Cup:
  - Winner: 2018
  - Semifinalist: 2011
