= Alin Roșu =

Romanian handball player (born 1989)

Personal information
- Full name: Alin Roșu
- Nationality: Romanian
- Born: 21 August 1989 (age 37) Botoșani, Romania
- Height: 1.84 m (6 ft 0 in)

Sport
- Sport: Handball
- Position: Left wing
- Current club: Steaua București

Senior clubs
- Years: Team
- –2016: HC Vaslui
- 2016-2017: CSM București
- 2017-: Steaua București
National team
- Years: Team
- 2018-: Romania

Alin Roșu (born 21 August 1989) is a Romanian handballer who plays for Steaua București and the Romania national team.

== Achievements ==
- Liga Națională:
  - Silver Medalist: 2017, 2018
- Cupa României:
  - Third Place: 2017

== Individual awards ==
- All-Star Left Wing of the Liga Națională: 2018
