= Guillaume Saurina =

French handball player (born 1981)

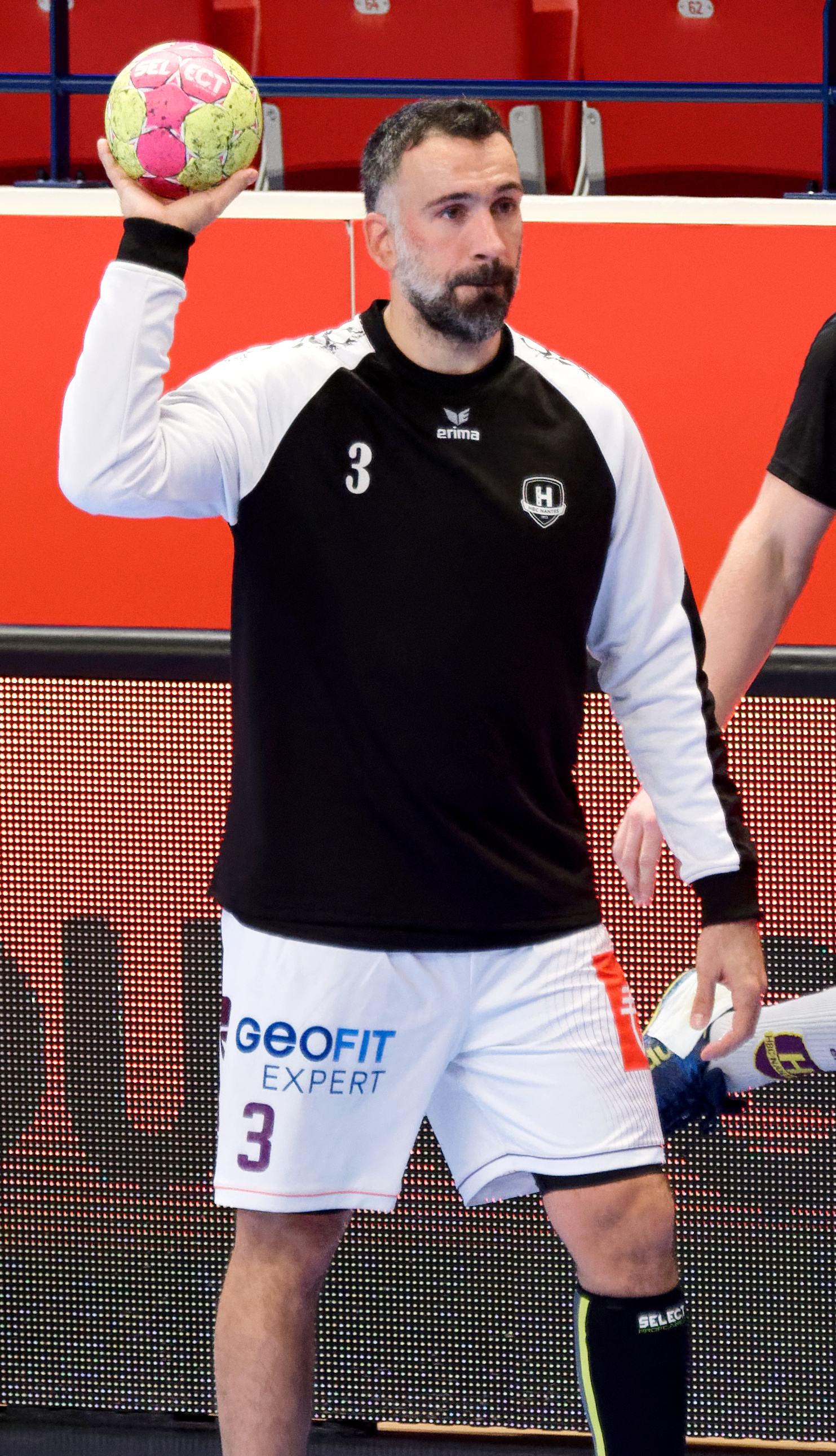
- Saurina in 2017

Personal information
- Full name: Guillaume Jérôme Patrick Saurina
- Nationality: French
- Born: 4 August 1981 (age 45) Nîmes, France
- Height: 1.91 m (6 ft 3 in)

Sport
- Sport: Handball
- Position: Left back
- Current club: HBC Nantes
- Number: 3

Senior clubs
- Years: Team
- 2001–2002: Villefranche Handball
- 2002–2006: Villeurbanne Handball
- 2006–2010: USAM Nîmes Gard
- 2010–2011: Chambéry Savoie Handball
- 2011–2016: USAM Nîmes Gard
- 2016–2017: CSM București
- 2017–2018: HBC Nantes
National team
Years	Team	Apps	(Gls)
2010	France	1	(2)

Teams managed
- 2018–: Nantes Handball (Ass. Coach)
Medal record
Mediterranean Games
Silver medal – second place	2009 Pescara	Team

Guillaume Jérôme Patrick Saurina (born 4 August 1981) is a French handball coach and former player. He played a single match for the French national team.

He is the all-time topscorer in the French Division, with a total of 1224 goals scored.

== Achievements ==
- Championnat de France:
  - Silver Medalist: 2011
- Coupe de France:
  - Finalist: 2011
- Coupe de la Ligue:
  - Finalist: 2011
- Trophée des champions:
  - Finalist: 2010
- Liga Națională:
  - Silver Medalist: 2017
- Supercupa Romaniei:
  - Finalist: 2016

== Individual awards ==
- Championnat de France Top Scorer: 2010, 2012

== Personal life ==
He is married to French international handballer Camille Ayglon.
