= Marius Sadoveac =

Romanian handball player (born 1985)

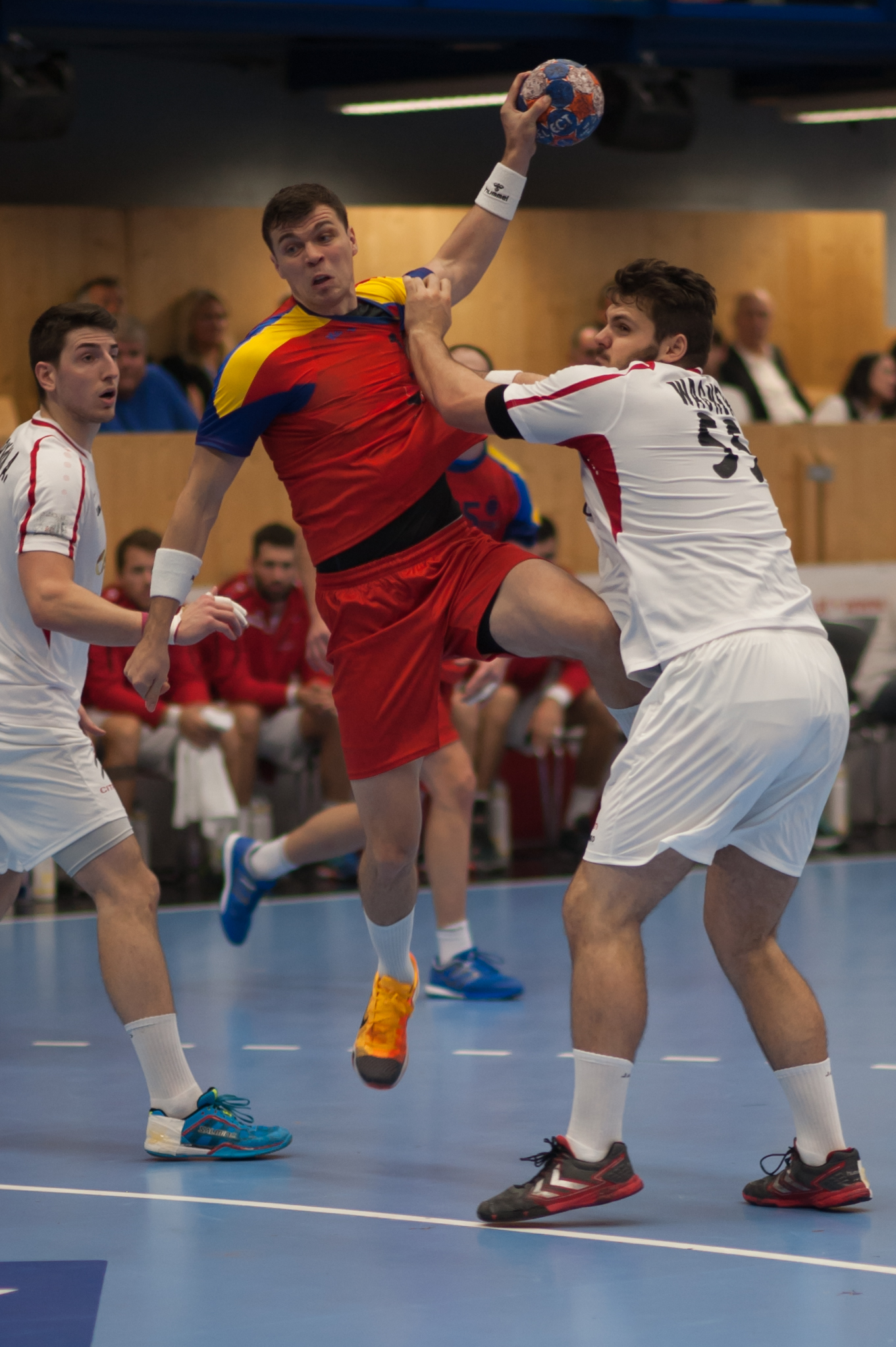
- Sadoveac in action for Romania

Personal information
- Full name: Marius Sadoveac
- Nationality: Romanian
- Born: 7 May 1985 (age 41) Timișoara, Romania
- Height: 1.93 m (6 ft 4 in)

Sport
- Sport: Handball
- Position: Right back / Right wing
- Current club: SCM Politehnica Timișoara

Senior clubs
- Years: Team
- –2008: Poli–Izometal Timișoara
- 2008-2014: HCM Constanța
- 2014-2016: HC Minaur Baia Mare
- 2016-2018: Tremblay Handball
- 2018-: SCM Politehnica Timișoara
National team
- Years: Team
- –: Romania

Marius Sadoveac (born 7 May 1985) is a Romanian handballer who plays for SCM Politehnica Timișoara and the Romania national team.

== Achievements ==
- Liga Națională:
  - Gold Medalist: 2009, 2010, 2011, 2012, 2013, 2014, 2015
- Cupa României:
  - Winner: 2011, 2012, 2013, 2014, 2015
- EHF Cup:
  - Fourth Place: 2014
