= CSM Făgăraș =

CSM Făgăraș may refer to:

- CSM Făgăraș (football), a men's football club
- CSM Făgăraș (men's handball), a men's handball club
