= Vitaly Komogorov =

Russian handball player (born 1991)

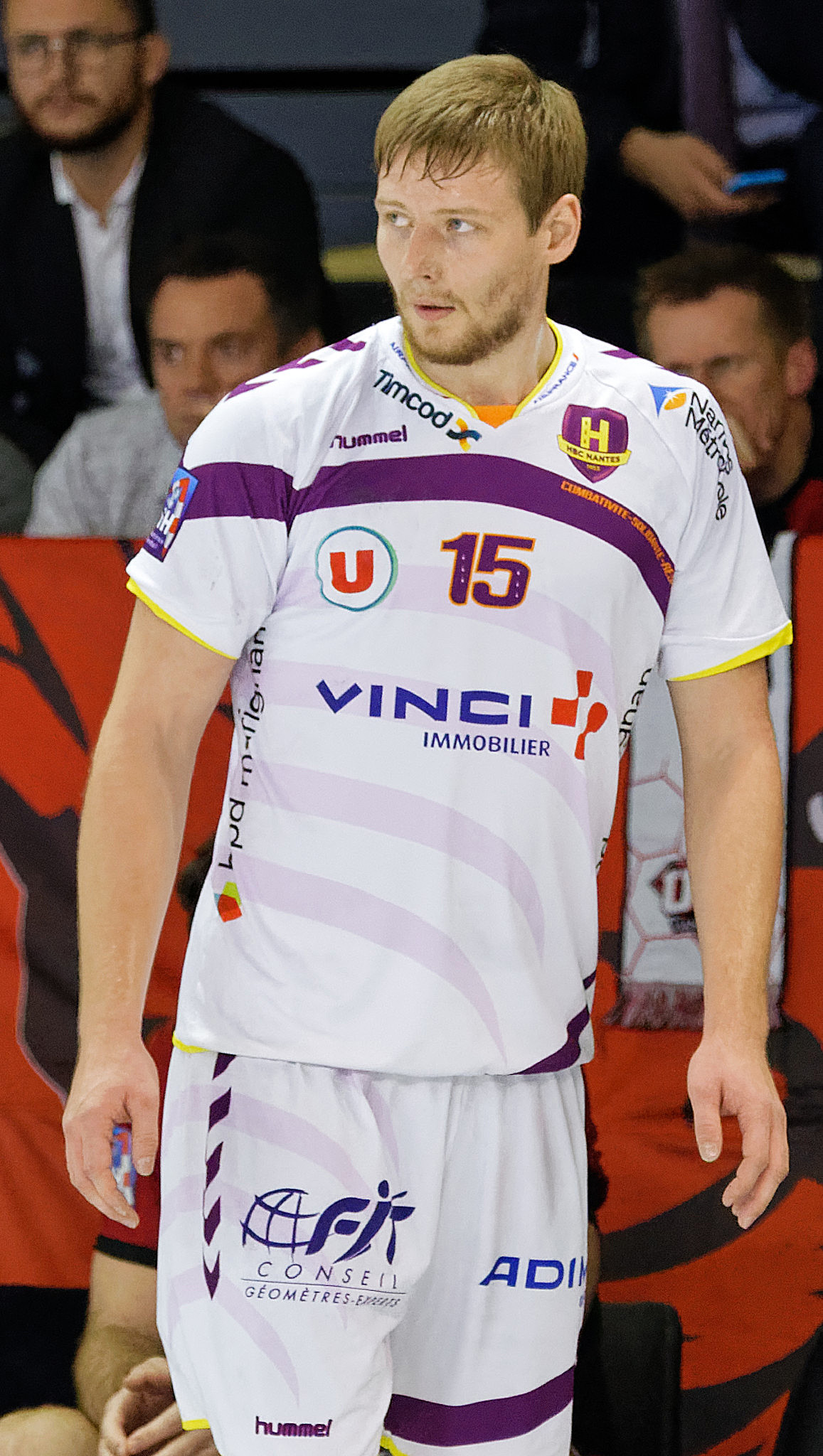

Personal information
- Nationality: Russian
- Born: 28 August 1991 (age 35) Volgograd, Russia
- Height: 1.96 m (6 ft 5 in)

Sport
- Sport: Handball
- Position: Left back
- Current club: HC Dobrogea Sud

Senior clubs
- Years: Team
- –2015: HC Kaustik Volgograd
- 2015–2016: HBC Nantes
- 2016–2017: HC Odorheiu Secuiesc
- 2017–2019: Dinamo București
- 2019–2020: Grundfos Tatabánya KC
- 2020–: HC Dobrogea Sud
National team
Years	Team	Apps	(Gls)
–	Russia	22	(14)

Vitaly Komogorov (born 28 August 1991) is a Russian handball player who plays for HC Dobrogea Sud and the Russian national team.

He represented Russia at the 2019 World Men's Handball Championship.

== Achievements ==
- Liga Națională:
  - Winner: 2018, 2019
- Supercupa României:
  - Winner: 2018
- LNH Division 1:
  - Bronze Medalist: 2016
- EHF Cup:
  - Finalist: 2016

== Individual awards ==
- Prosport All-Star Left Back of the Romanian Liga Națională: 2018
- Gala Premiilor Handbalului Românesc Liga Națională Left Back of the Season: 2019
