= Cristian Fenici =

Romanian handball player (born 1986)

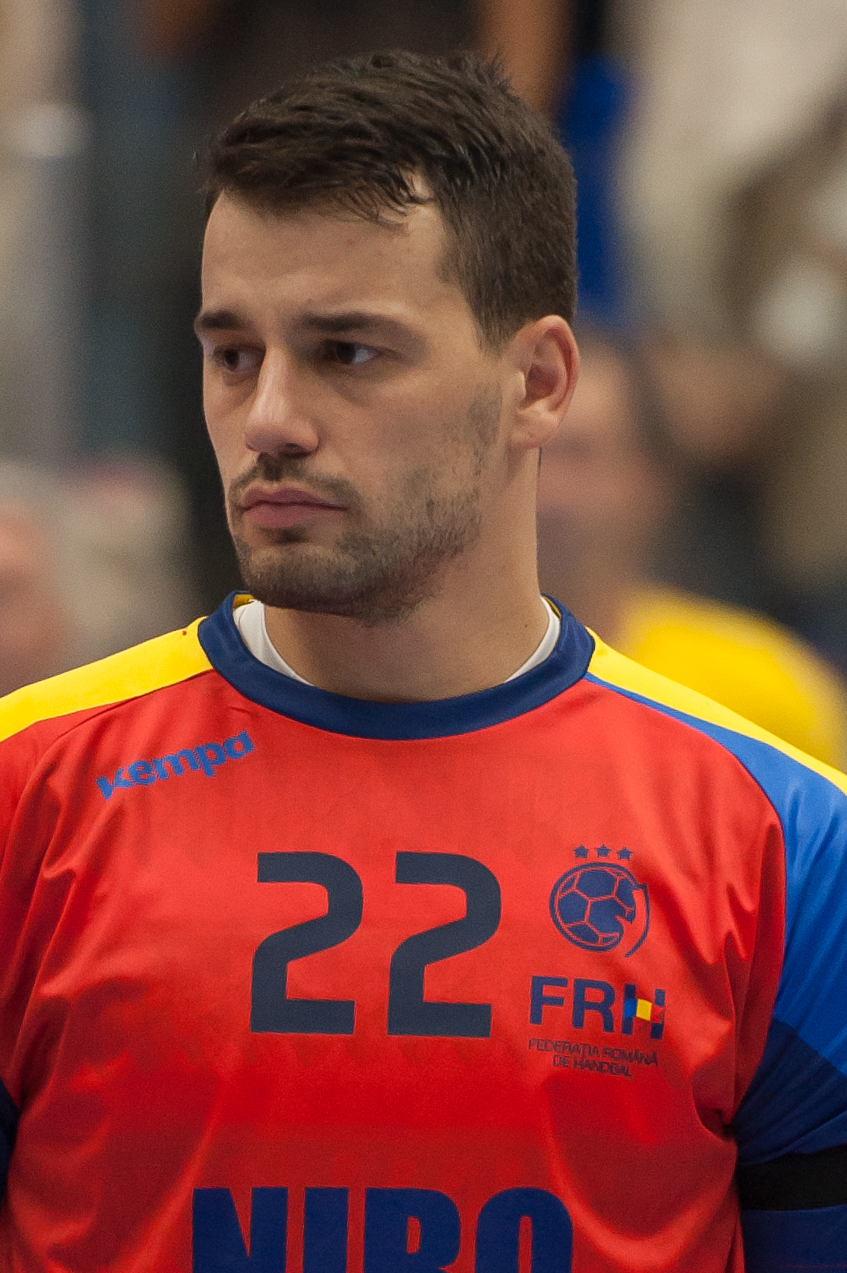

Personal information
- Full name: Cristian Stelian Fenici
- Nationality: Romanian
- Born: 13 February 1986 (age 40) Timișoara, Romania
- Height: 1.90 m (6 ft 3 in)

Sport
- Sport: Handball
- Position: Centre back
- Current club: SCM Politehnica Timișoara
National team
- Years: Team
- –: Romania

Cristian Stelian Fenici (born 13 February 1986) is a Romanian handballer who plays for as a centre back for SCM Politehnica Timișoara and the Romania national team.

== Individual awards ==
- Romanian Liga Națională Best Romanian Player: 2015
- Prosport All-Star Centre Back of the Romanian Liga Națională: 2018
- Gala Premiilor Handbalului Românesc Liga Națională Centre Back of the Season: 2019
