= Raul Nantes =

Brazilian handball player (born 1990)

Personal information
- Full name: Raul Nantes Campos
- Born: 20 March 1990 (age 36) Nova Andradina, MS, Brazil
- Height: 1.95 m (6 ft 5 in)

Sport
- Sport: Handball
- Position: Left back
- Current club: CSM București
- Number: 49

Senior clubs
- Years: Team
- 2006: EC Pinheiros
- 2007–2008: Sao Caetano Andebol
- 2009–2012: CB Ademar León
- 2012–2014: Tremblay-en-France
- 2014–2015: Bilière Handball
- 2015–2017: BM Villa de Aranda
- 2017–2019: Helvetia Anaitasuna
- 2019–2020: Dinamo București
- 2020–2021: CSM București
- 2021–2022: Dinamo București
- 2022–2023: Al Ahly
- 2023: Limoges Handball
- 2024–: CSM București
National team
Years	Team	Apps	(Gls)
–	Brazil	78	(264)
Medal record
Pan American Games
Gold medal – first place	2015 Toronto	Team
Bronze medal – third place	2019 Lima	Team
South and Central American Championship
Gold medal – first place	2022 Brazil
Silver medal – second place	2020 Brazil

Raul Nantes (born 20 March 1990) is a Brazilian handball player for CSM București and the Brazilian national team.

He represented Brazil at the 2019 World Men's Handball Championship.
