= Andrei Mihalcea =

Romanian handball player (born 1987)

Personal information
- Full name: Andrei Mihalcea
- Nationality: Romanian
- Born: 15 August 1987 (age 39) Hunedoara, Romania
- Height: 1.82 m (6 ft 0 in)

Sport
- Sport: Handball
- Position: Right wing
- Current club: Steaua București
- Number: 5

Senior clubs
- Years: Team
- –2018: HC Odorheiu Secuiesc
- 2018–: Steaua București
National team
- Years: Team
- –: Romania

Andrei Mihalcea (born 15 August 1987) is a Romanian handballer who plays for Steaua București and the Romania national team.

== International honours ==
- EHF Challenge Cup:
  - Winner: 2015

== Individual awards ==
- Liga Națională Best Romanian Player Award: 2016
- All-Star Right Wing of the Liga Națională: 2017, 2018
