= HC Buzău =

Handball team from Buzău, Romania

- Full name: Handbal Club Buzău 2012
- Nickname(s): Lupii Buzăului (The Buzău Wolves)
- Short name: HCBZ
- Founded: 2012; 14 years ago
- Arena: Romeo Iamandi
- Capacity: 1,868
- President: (Romania) George Bãducu
- Head coach: (Spain) Serhiy Bebeshko
- League: Liga Națională
- 2025–26: Liga Națională, 2nd of 14
- Club colours
| Home | Away |

Handbal Club Buzău 2012 (HC Buzău) is a Romanian men's handball team from Buzău, founded in 2012, which competes in the Liga Națională and European competitions.

== History ==
Handbal Club Buzău 2012, commonly known as HC Buzău, is a men's handball team from Buzău, Romania. The club was founded in 2012 and was promoted for the first time in its history to the Liga Națională at the end of the 2017–18 Divizia A season. Nicknamed "The Buzău Wolves", the team plays its home matches at the Romeo Iamandi Sports Hall in Buzău, a sports hall with a capacity of 1,868 spectators. After their promotion, HC Buzău spent several seasons fighting to avoid relegation and consolidate their place in the top division. At the end of the 2024–25 season, the club achieved its best-ever finish in the Liga Națională, securing 3rd place and qualifying for European competitions for the first time in its history. In their first participation in the EHF European Cup, they reached the quarter-finals. In the 2025–26 season, HC Buzău improved on the previous season’s performance by finishing as runners-up in the Liga Națională, becoming vice-champions of Romania for the first time in the club’s history.

== Honours ==
=== European Competitions ===
- EHF European Cup
  - Quarter final: 2025–26

=== Domestic Competitions ===
- National League:
  - Runners-up (1): 2026
  - Third place (1): 2025
- Divizia A:
  - Runners-up (1): 2018
- Romanian Super Cup:
  - Finalist (1): 2026

== Team ==
=== Current squad ===
Squad for the 2026–27 season

Goalkeeper

- 1 (Romania) Alexandru Bucătaru
- 12 (Romania) Eugen Crăciunescu
- 16 (Romania) Cristian Tcaciuc

Left Wingers

- 10 (Romania) Vencel Csog
- 20 (Romania) Andrei Bejinariu

Right Wingers

- 7 (Romania) Ionuț Broască
- 19 (Romania) Alexandru Tărîță

Line Players

- 30 (Romania) Didi Hrimiuc
- 90 (Montenegro) Nemanja Grbović
- 43 (Romania) Daniel Susanu

Left Backs

- 17 (Serbia) Zeljko Sukić
- 25 (Serbia) Ivan Mošić
- 34 (Russia) Vitaly Komogorov

Central Backs

- 11 (Romania) Claudiu Lazurcă
- 18 (Lithuania) Gabrielius Virbauskas
- 21 (Poland) Łukasz Gogola
- 28 (Romania) Mihnea Toma

Right Backs

- 5 (Norway) Øyvind Frigstad
- 24 (Serbia) Mihajlo Mitić

=== Staff ===
Staff for the 2026–27 season

- (Romania) President: Georgian Băducu
- (Romania) Team Manager: Răzvan Voicu
- (Spain) Head Coach: Serhiy Bebeshko
- (Romania) Assistant Coach: Bogdan Constantin
- (Romania) Physiotherapist: Ionuț Nămoloșanu
- (Romania) Masseur: Drăgan Gheorghe

=== Transfers ===
Transfers for the 2026–27 season

Joining

- (Serbia) Ivan Mošić (LB) from (Romania) AHC Potaissa Turda
- (Romania) Alexandru Bucătaru (GK) from (Romania) AHC Potaissa Turda
- (Romania) Daniel Susanu (LP) from (Romania) CSM Constanța
- (Romania) Claudiu Lazurcă (CB) from (Romania) CSU Suceava
- (Norway) Øyvind Frigstad (RB) (from (Qatar) Al Duhail SC)

Leaving

- (Ukraine) Gennadiy Komok (GK) (retires)
- (Bosnia and Herzegovina) Edin Klis (LB) to (Romania) CS Minaur Baia Mare
- (Romania) Bogdan Cătălin Rață (LP) to (Romania) CSM Constanța
- (Romania) Valentin Ivancenco (CB) to (Romania) CSO Teutonii Ghimbav
- (Romania) Mihai Anton (RB) to (Romania) CSO Teutonii Ghimbav
- (Romania) Andrei Gopsa (RB) to (Romania) CSM Vaslui

=== Transfer History ===
Transfers for the 2025–26 season

Joining

- (Russia) Vitaly Komogorov (LB) from (Romania) CSM Constanța
- (Montenegro) Nemanja Grbović (LP) from (Romania) Steaua București
- (Lithuania) Žanas Gabrielius Virbauskas (CB) from (Romania) CSM Bacău
- (Poland) Łukasz Gogola (CB) from (Poland) KS Azoty-Puławy
- (Serbia) Željko Šukić (LB) from (Bosnia and Herzegovina) RK Leotar
- (Romania) Vencel Csog (LW) from (Romania) CSU Suceava
- (Romania) Alexandru Tărîță (RW) from (Romania) Steaua București

Leaving

- (Serbia) Ivan Mošić (LB) to (Romania) AHC Potaissa Turda
- (Lithuania) Aidenas Malašinskas (CB) to (Romania) CSM Vaslui
- (Romania) Daniel Susanu (LP) loan back to (Romania) CSM Constanța
- (Portugal) Sergio Barros (LW) (to ?)
- (Romania) Robert Cîțu (RW) (to ?)
- (Serbia) Bogdan Medurić (LP) (to ?)
- (Serbia) Luka Mitrovic (CB) (to ?)
