= CS Universitatea Cluj-Napoca (men's handball) =

Romanian men's handball club

Universitatea Cluj-Napoca
- Full name: Clubul Sportiv Universitatea Cluj-Napoca
- Nickname(s): Studenții (The Students); Șepcile Roșii (The Red Caps)
- Short name: U Cluj
- Founded: 1935; 91 years ago
- Arena: Sala Sporturilor "Horia Demian", Cluj-Napoca
- Capacity: 2,525
- President: (Romania) Liviu Jurcă
- Head coach: (Romania) Valentina Ardean-Elisei
- League: Divizia A
- 2021–22: Liga Națională, 14th of 14 (relegated)
- Club colours
Home	Away

Universitatea Cluj-Napoca, commonly known as Universitatea Cluj, or simply as U Cluj, is a team handball club from Cluj-Napoca, Romania, that plays in the Divizia A. The club is a historical one in Romania, but in recent years the team is stuck in the second league, in principle due to the low budget.

Location of CS Universitatea Cluj-Napoca

== Kits ==
HOME
2019–21	2021-22

AWAY
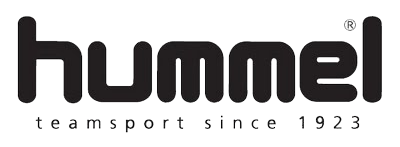
2019–

== Sports Hall information ==
Home hall: Sala Sporturilor "Horia Demian"

- Name: – Sala Sporturilor "Horia Demian"
- City: – Cluj-Napoca
- Capacity: – 2525
- Address: – Strada Splaiul Independenţei 6, Cluj-Napoca 400000, Romania

== Team ==
=== Current squad ===
Squad for the 2025–26 season

Goalkeepers
Left Wingers
Right Wingers

- (Czech Republic) Tomáš Číp

Line players

- (Iran) Alireza Mousavi
- (Romania) Georgel Gheorghita Costea

Left Backs
Central Backs

- (Romania) Octavian Bizău

Right Backs

=== Transfers ===
Transfers for the 2026–27 season

Joining

- (Serbia) (Croatia) Stefan Vujić (CB) from (Romania) CS Minaur Baia Mare
- (Iran) Mohammad Reza Oraei (RB) from (France) Istres Provence Handball
- (Romania) Adrian Tenghea (GK) from (Romania) CSM Vaslui

Leaving

=== Transfer History ===
Transfers for the 2025–26 season

Joining

- (Czech Republic) Tomáš Číp (RW) from (Romania) Minaur Baia Mare
- (Iran) Alireza Mousavi (LP) from (Romania) CSM Bacău
- (Romania) Georgel Gheorghita Costea (LP) from (Romania) CSM Bacău
- (Romania) Octavian Bizău (CB) from (Romania) Steaua București

Leaving

== Honours ==
- Liga Națională:
  - Third (3): 1969, 1970, 2000
- Divizia A:
  - Third (1): 2018
