= CSM Focșani (handball) =

Romanian association men's handball team

- Full name: Club Sportiv Municipal Focșani
- Short name: Focșani
- Founded: 2007; 19 years ago
- Arena: Sala Sporturilor "Vrancea"
- Capacity: 1,400
- President: (Romania) Viorel Ciubotaru
- Head coach: (Serbia) Dalibor Cutura
- League: Liga Națională
- 2021–22: Liga Națională, 6th of 14
- Club colours
Home	Away

Club Sportiv Municipal Focșani, commonly known as CSM Focșani, or simply Focșani, is a Romanian men's handball team based in Focșani, Vrancea County, that plays in Liga Națională, the top flight of Romanian handball.

The team represents the men's handball section of the multi-sport club CSM Focșani, which also include men's football, men's basketball, athletics, volleyball, martial arts, judo, chess, tennis, table tennis, shooting sports and taekwondo sections.

The team plays its home matches in the Sala Sporturilor "Vrancea", a sports hall which was built in 1975 with a capacity of 1,400 people.

== History ==
The team promoted for the very first time in the Liga Națională in 2015. At the end of the 2017–18 season the club managed to avoid relegation and finished on the 10th place.

== Kits ==
HOME
2018–19	2020-21

AWAY
2017–18	2019–20	2021–22

== Team ==
=== Current squad ===
Squad for the 2024–25 season

Goalkeepers

- (Romania) Emilian Marocico
- (Romania) Marius Cloasca
- (Romania) Silviu Visan

Left Wingers

- (Romania) Mihaita Miroiu
- (Romania) David Pavlov

Right Wingers

- (Romania) Valentin Mocanu
- (Romania) Tiberius Tobosaru

Line players

- (Romania) Didi Hrimiuc
- (Turkey) Ilkan Kelesoglu
- (Romania) Marius Ragea
- (Romania) Tiberiu Popovici

Left Backs

- (Turkey) Yakup Simsar
- (Russia) Roman Makrishin

Central Backs

- (Turkey) Ozcan Erdogan
- (Romania) Alexandru Golea

Right Backs

- (Norway) Oyvind Frigstad
- (Ukraine) Danylo Hlushac

=== Transfers ===
Transfers for the 2025–26 season

Joining

Leaving

- (Ukraine) Danylo Hlushak (RW) to (Romania) CSM Sighişoara
- (Romania) Marius Ionut Closca (GK) to (Romania) CSM Constanța
