= Lascăr Pană Sports Hall =

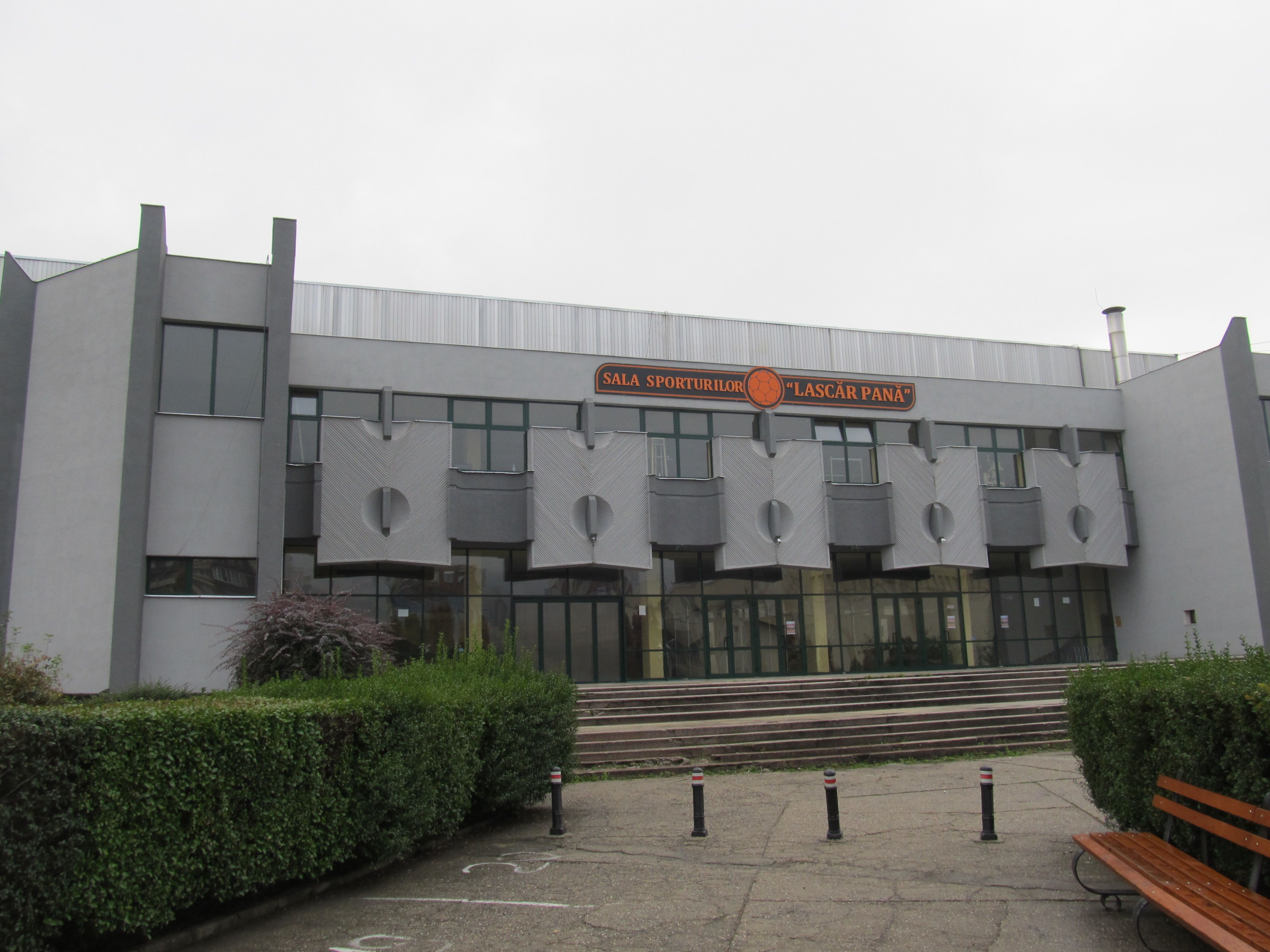
- Interactive map of Lascăr Pană Sports Hall
- Full name: Sala Sporturilor Lascăr Pană
- Location: Baia Mare, Romania
- Owner: DJST Maramureș
- Capacity: 2,048

Construction
- Opened: 1974
- Renovated: 2014

Tenants
- Minaur Baia Mare (W); Minaur Baia Mare (M); Știința Explorări Baia Mare

Lascăr Pană Sports Hall is an indoor arena in Baia Mare, Romania and is the home ground of sports clubs from Baia Mare.
