= AHC Dunărea Călărași =

Romanian handball club

- Full name: AHC Dunărea Călărași 2014
- Short name: Dunărea Călărași
- Founded: February 2014; 12 years ago
- Arena: Sala Polivalentă "Ion.C.Neagu" Călărași
- Capacity: 1,540
- President: (Romania) Cristian Zanfir
- Head coach: (Romania) Gabriel Armanu; (Romania) Eremia Pîrîianu
- League: Liga Națională
- 2018–19: Liga Naţională, 5th
- Club colours
Home	Away

AHC Dunărea Călărași 2014 is a handball club from Călărași, Romania, that plays in the Romanian Handball League.

== Kits ==
HOME
2017–18	2018–19	2019–21

AWAY
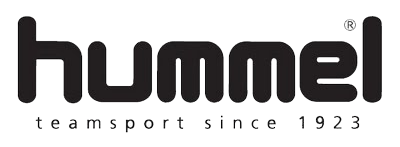
2020-

== Team ==
=== Current squad ===
Squad for the 2020-2021 season

Staff tehnic

- (Romania) Gabriel Armanu (30.12.1972.Bacau)
- (Romania) Eremia Piriianu (16.10.1975.Constanta)
- (Romania) Florin Iuliu Dima (5.04.1963.Brasov)

Goalkeepers

- Artsem Padasinau (4.01.1989.Gomel / Belarus)
- (Romania) Vlad Dumitru Rusu (27.04.1998.Moinesti)
- (Romania) Cristian Balasa (9.04.2001.Calarasi)
- (Romania) Eugen Stefan Nicolae Craciunescu (16.04.1999. Curtea de Arges)

Wingers
RW

- (Romania) Gabriel Bujor (8.11.1990.Tecuci)
- (Romania) Ionuț Broască (8.02.1998.Braila)
- (Romania) Nicolae Ilies Costea (20.07.2002.Calarasi)

LW

- (Romania) Florin Ovidiu Dospinescu (23.03.1996.Piatra Neamt)
- (Romania) Cătălin Sabin Costea (31.071995, Baia Mare)

Line players

- (Romania) Dragoș Soare (23.07.1989.Ploiesti)
- (Romania) Gabriel Florinel Dumitru (30.01.1996.Galati)
- (Romania) Daniel Panait (6.04.2000.Calarasi)
- (Romania) Bogdan Marian Păunescu (3.08.1995.Calarasi)

Back players
LB

- (Romania) Dragos Hanțaru (24.04.1998.Vaslui)
- Amin Yusefinezhad (19.01.1996, Iran)

CB

- (Romania) Mihai Sebastian Bujor (8.11.1990.Tecuci)
- (Romania) Andrei Valeriu Dragan (6.07.1999.Sf Gheorghe.Covasna)

RB

- (Ukraine) Aleksii Ganchev (28.08.1986, Zaporozhye / Ucraina)
- (Greece) Alexios Karympov (3.05.1996.Astrahan / Rusia)

=== Transfers ===
Transfers for the 2020-21 season

Joining

- Amin Yousefinezhand (Iran)
- Artsem Padasinau (4.01.1989.Gomel / Belarus)
- (Ukraine) Aleksey Ganchev (28.08.1986, Zaporozhye / Ucraina)
- (Romania) Andrei Dragan
- (Romania) Eugen Craciunescu
- (Greece) Alexyos Karimpov (Grecia)
- (Romania) Nicolae Ilies Costea (20.07.2002 / Calarasi)

Leaving

- (Romania) Victor Vartic (CSA Steaua Bucuresti)
- (Romania) Roman Zacaciurin (AHC Potaissa Turda)
- (Romania) George Șelaru (AHC Potaissa Turda)
- (Romania) Bogdan Moisa (CSM Fagaras)
- (Romania) Ionut Rotaru (AHC Dobrogea Sud Constanta/ CSM Bacau)
- (Romania) Mihai Marcel Sandu
- Mihajlo Radojković (Serbia)

- (Romania) Florin Dospinescu (CSM Reșița)
- (Romania) Dragoș Hanțaru (CS Dinamo București)
- (Romania) Ionuț Broască (CS HC Buzău)
- (Romania) Gabriel Dumitriu (AHC Potaissa Turda)
- (Romania) Vlăduț Dumitru Rusu (CSM Bacău)
- (Romania) Gabriel Bujor (CSM Bacău)
- (Romania) Mihai Sebastian Bujor (CSM Bacău)
- (Romania) Andrei Valeriu Drăgan (CSM Focșani)

== Notable coaches ==
- (Romania) Aihan Omer
- (Romania) Ioan Bucur Bota
- (Serbia) Caslav Dincic
- (Romania) Florin Nicolae
- (Romania) Adrian Dănuț Petrea
- (Ukraine) Serhiy Bebeshko
- (Ukraine) Igor Rapovers
- (Romania) Eremia Rică Pîrîianu
- (Romania) Gabriel Armanu
