= CSU Suceava =

Romanian men's handball club

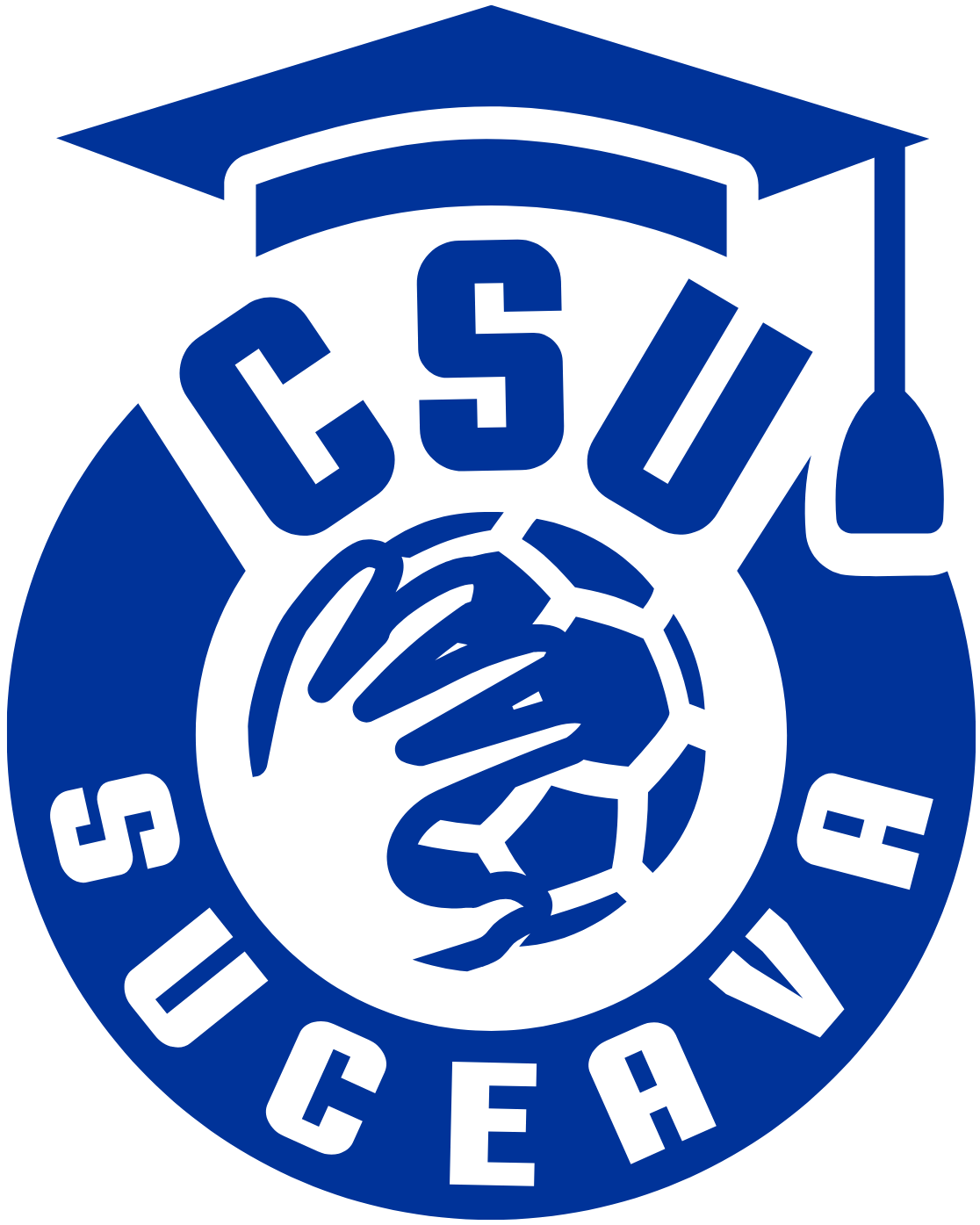
- Full name: Clubul Sportiv Universitatea Suceava
- Short name: CSU
- Founded: 2002; 24 years ago
- Arena: Sala LPS
- Capacity: 450
- Head coach: (Romania) Soldanescu Bogdan
- League: Liga Națională
- 2021–22: Liga Națională, 9th of 14
- Club colours
Home	Away

CSU Suceava, also known as Universitatea Suceava, is a men's handball club from Suceava, Romania, that plays in the Romanian Handball League.

== Crest, colours, supporters ==
=== Club crest ===
Old Logo
(-2023)

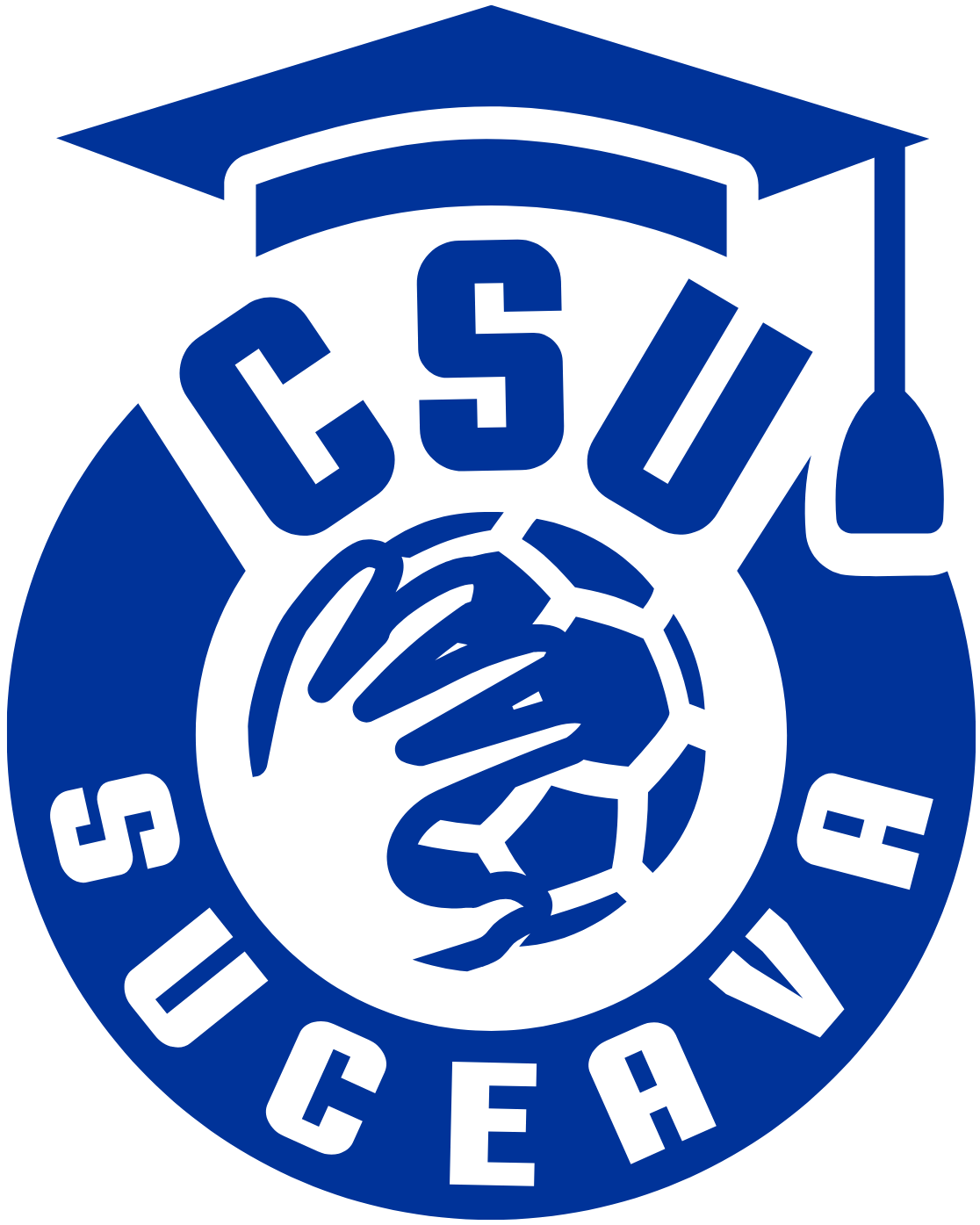
New Logo
(2023-present)

=== Kits ===
HOME
2018–19	2020–

AWAY
2017-18	2018-19	2020–21	2021–22

== Team ==
=== Current squad ===
Squad for the 2025–26 season

Goalkeepers
Left Wingers
Right Wingers
Line players

Left Backs
Central Backs
Right Backs

=== Transfers ===
Transfers for the 2026–27 season

Joining

Leaving

- (Romania) Claudiu Lazurcă (CB) to (Romania) HC Buzău
- (Romania) Florin Sirghie (GK) to (Romania) CSM Vaslui

=== Transfer History ===
Transfers for the 2025–26 season

Joining

Leaving

- (Romania) Vencel Csog (LW) to (Romania) HC Buzău
