= CSM Reșița (men's handball) =

Romanian handball club

- Full name: Clubul Sportiv Municipal Reșița
- Nickname(s): Rosso-Nerii (The Red and Blacks); Reșițenii (The Reșița People)
- Short name: Reșița
- Founded: 2014; 11 years ago as Adrian Petrea Reșița; 2017; 8 years ago as CSM Școlar Reșița
- Arena: Sala Polivalentă
- Capacity: 1,669
- President: (Romania) Viorel Lolea
- Head coach: (Romania) Marcel Vulpe
- League: Liga Națională
- 2018–19: Divizia A, 2nd (promoted)
- Club colours
| Home | Away |

Clubul Sportiv Municipal Reșița, commonly known as CSM Reșița, or simply as Reșița, is a men's handball club from Reșița, Romania, that plays in the Divizia A. The club was founded in 2014 as HC Adrian Petrea Reșița, to continue the handball tradition from town, after the dissolution of a much greater club UCM Reșița. After a few seasons in the Liga Națională, the club encountered financial difficulties and retired in the middle of the 2016–17 season.

In the summer of 2017 HC Adrian Petrea Reșița was refounded and re-organized as CSM Școlar Reșița, being the handball section of CSM Școlar Reșița.

== Kits ==
HOME
| Select; 2018-19 | 2019–20 | 2020-21 |

AWAY
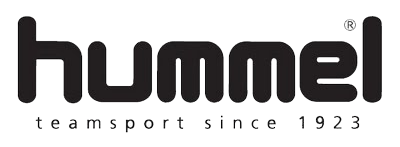
2020-21

== Honours ==
- Divizia A:
  - Winners (1): 2015
  - Runners-up (1): 2019
