= Concordia Sports Hall =

Indoor arena in Chiajna, Romania

- Location: Chiajna, Romania
- Operator: CS Concordia Chiajna
- Capacity: 1,465

Construction
- Opened: December 15, 2006
- Cost: €10 million

Tenants
- Concordia Chiajna; Steaua București

Concordia Sports Hall (Romanian: 'Sala Sporturilor Concordia') is an indoor arena in Chiajna, Romania.
