= CSM Bacău (men's handball) =

Romanian men's handball team

- Full name: Clubul Sportiv Municipal Bacău
- Short name: CSM
- Founded: 1962; 64 years ago as Dinamo Bacău
- Arena: Sala Sporturilor
- Capacity: 2,000
- President: (Romania) Florin Grapă
- Head coach: (Romania) Leonard Bibirig
- League: Liga Națională
- 2023–24: Liga Națională, 6th
- Club colours
Home	Away

Clubul Sportiv Municipal Bacău, commonly known as CSM Bacău, is a men's handball team from Bacău, Romania. The club was founded in 1962 as Dinamo Bacău and was also known for a period as Știința Municipal Dedeman Bacău, due to sponsorship reasons. The club's best performances are three 2nd places in the Liga Națională, in 2012, 2013 and 2014 and two 3rd places in 1968 and 1980. The team is the handball section of CSM Bacău (Bacău Municipality Sports Club).

The club plays its home matches in Sala Sporturilor from Bacău, a sports hall with a capacity of 2,000 people.

== Kits ==
HOME

2019–21

AWAY
2019–20	2021-22

== Honours ==
- Liga Națională:
  - Runners-up (3): 2012, 2013, 2014
  - Third (2): 1968, 1980
- Divizia A:
  - Winners (1): 2018
  - Runners-up (1): 2016
  - Third (1): 2017

== Team ==
=== Current squad ===
Squad for the 2024–25 season

CSM Bacău

Goalkeepers

- (Romania) Florin Sîrghie
- (Romania) Stefan Grigoras
- (Serbia) Milos Mojsilov

Left Wingers

- (Romania) Catalin Ionut Braescu
- (Romania) Florin Dospinescu

Right Wingers

- (Romania) Vasile Dobrincu
- (Romania) Gabriel Bujor

Line Players

- (Iran) Alireza Mousavi
- (Belarus) Aliaksei Ushal
- (Romania) Georgel Gheorghita Costea

Left Backs

- (Iran) Sajjad Esteki
- (Moldova) Maxim Oancea

Central Backs

- (Belarus) Bahdan Serhel
- (Lithuania) Gabrielius Zanas Virbauskas
- (Romania) Mihai Bujor

Right Backs

- (Romania) Bogdan Mănescu

=== Technical staff ===
- Head coach: (Romania) Leonard Bibirig

=== Transfers ===
Transfers for the 2025–26 season

Joining

Leaving

- (Lithuania) Zanas Virbauskas (CB) to (Romania) HC Buzău
- (Belarus) Aliaksei Ushal (LP) to (Slovakia) HT Tatran Prešov
- (Iran) Alireza Mousavi (LP) to (Romania) CS Universitatea Cluj
- (Serbia) Milos Mojsilov (GK) to (Hungary) Szigetszentmiklósi KSK
- (Romania) Gabriel Bujor (RW) to (Romania) CSM Constanța
- (Romania) Mihai Bujor (CB) to (Romania) CSM Constanța
- (Romania) Bogdan Mănescu (RB) to (Romania) CSM București
- (Romania) Georgel Gheorghita Costea (LP) to (Romania) CS Universitatea Cluj
