= SCM Politehnica Timișoara =

Romanian handball club

- Full name: Sport Club Municipal Politehnica Timișoara
- Short name: Poli
- Founded: 1947; 79 years ago
- Arena: Constantin Jude Hall
- Capacity: 2,000
- Head coach: (Romania) George Buricea
- League: Liga Națională
- 2024-25: Liga Națională, 12th
- Club colours
Home	Away

SCM Politehnica Timișoara is a team handball club from Timișoara, Romania, that plays in the Romanian Handball League.

== Kits ==
HOME
2016–17	2017–18

AWAY
2017–18	2021-22

== Achievements ==
- Romanian League (in 11 players)
  - Winners: 1956
- Romanian League:
  - Winners: 1991
- Romanian Cup:
  - Winners: 1986, 2019
  - Runners-up: 1983, 1988, 2018, 2026

== European record ==
Season	Competition	Round	Club	1st leg	2nd leg	Aggregate
2007–08	Challenge Cup	R3	(Switzerland) Wacker Thun	26–27	28–24	54–51
2007–08	Challenge Cup	1/8 Final	(Iceland) Fram	26–24	24–25	50–49
2007–08	Challenge Cup	1/4 Final	(Portugal) SL Benfica	22–32	21–22	43–54
2016–17	EHF Cup	R1	(Estonia) Põlva Serviti	26–22	25–21	51–43
2016–17	EHF Cup	R2	(Norway) ØIF Arendal	24–23	27–26	51–49
2016–17	EHF Cup	R3	(Slovenia) RD Ribnica	27–22	19–30	46–52
2019–20	EHF Cup	R2	(Greece) Olympiacos H.C.	31–29	26–29	57–58
2026–27	EHF European Cup	R2	(Lithuania) Granitas-Karys	38–25	39–22	77–47
2026–27	EHF European Cup	R3	(Montenegro) RK Lovćen	–	–	–

== Team ==
=== Current squad ===
Squad for the 2025-2026 season

Goalkeepers

- (Romania) Dan Vasile
- (Serbia) Tomislav Stojkovic
- (Romania) Claudiu Pal

Wingers

- (Romania) Alexandru Andrei
- (Ukraine) Zakhar Denysov
- (Ukraine) Artem Kozakevych
- (Croatia) Valentino Ravnić
- (Croatia) Paolo Kraljević

Line players

- (Romania) Andras Szasz
- (Serbia) Zoran Nikolić
- (Romania) Stefan Mark Adoreanu Kraiger

Back players

- (Romania) Marius Sadoveac
- (Romania) Cristian Fenici
- (Romania) Razvan-Cristian Trif
- (Romania) Aron Dedu
- (Romania) Eduard Belchite
- (Brazil) Raul Nantes
- (Brazil) Thiago Alves Ponciano
- (Montenegro) Risto Vujacić
- (Italy) Christian Manojlović

=== Transfers ===
Transfers for the 2026–27 season

Joining

- (Poland) Łukasz Rogulski (LP) from (Poland) Industria Kielce
- (Ukraine) Anton Terekhov (GK) from (Romania) CS Minaur Baia Mare
- (Greece) Theodoros Boskos (LB) from (Hungary) Budai Farkasok KKUK
- (Croatia) Antonio Ljubić (LP) from (Croatia) RK Poreč
- (Norway) Kristoffer Gjelsvik (CB) from (Norway) TIF Viking

Leaving

- (Serbia) Tomislav Stojković (GK) to (Israel) Maccabi Tel Aviv
- (Italy) Christian Manojlović (LB) on loan at (Portugal) Sporting CP
- (Romania) Dan Vasile (GK) to (Romania) CSM București
- (Romania) Dragoș Dăneasa (LW) on loan at (Romania) HCS Dinamyc Zalău
- (Romania) Alexandru Moțățăianu (LB) on loan at (Romania) HCS Dinamyc Zalău

=== Transfer history ===
Transfers for the 2025–26 season

Joining

- (Brazil) Raul Nantes (LB) from (Romania) CSM București
- (Brazil) Thiago Ponciano (LB) from (Spain) CB Ciudad de Logroño
- (Montenegro) Risto Vujačić (RB) from (Israel) HC Ramat HaSharon
- (Ukraine) Zakhar Denysov (LW) from (Ukraine) HC Motor Zaporizhzhia
- (Croatia) Josip Božić Pavletić (RW) from (France) Istres Provence Handball
- (Croatia) Valentino Ravnić (LW) from (Romania) CSM Constanța
- (Croatia) Paolo Kraljević (RW) from (Croatia) RK Zagreb
- (Serbia) Zoran Nikolić (LP) from (Romania) CSM Constanța
- (Romania) Dan Vasile (GK) from (Romania) CSM Constanța
- (Romania) Alexandru Andrei (LW) from (Romania) CSM Constanța
- (Romania) (Hungary) Andras Szasz (LP) from (Romania) CSM Constanța
- (Romania) Aron Dedu (LB) from (Romania) HC Odorheiu Secuiesc

Leaving

- (Serbia) Đorđe Pisarić (CB) to (Serbia) RK Metaloplastika
- (Romania) Antonio Bordeanu (RB) on loan at (Romania) CSM Sighişoara
- (Romania) Flavius Cimpan
- (Romania) Sabin Ignat
- (Romania) Mihai Huta
- (Bosnia and Herzegovina) Haris Buljina

== Notable players ==
- (Romania) Nicolae Popescu
- (Romania) Ghennadii Solomon
- (Romania) Roland Gunnesch
- (Romania) Alexandru Fölker
- (Romania) (Germany) Herbert Müller
- (Romania) Alexandru Buligan
- (Romania) Alexandru Dedu
- (Romania) Alexandru Șimicu
- (Romania) Marius Sadoveac
- (Romania) Demis Grigoraș
- (Romania) Diliță Adrian
