= AHC Potaissa Turda =

Romanian handball club

Potaissa Turda
- Full name: AHC Potaissa Turda
- Short name: Potaissa
- Founded: 2000; 26 years ago
- President: Flaviu Sâsâeac
- Head coach: Horațiu Gal
- League: Liga Națională
- 2024–25: Liga Națională, 2nd of 14
- Club colours
Home	Away

AHC Potaissa Turda is a men's handball club from Turda, Romania, that plays in the Romanian Handball League. Potaissa Turda is a notable Romanian team in the last decade. In the last four years, is the only team that have qualified to the Final 4 of the national championships, in every season. Potaissa Turda won the EHF Challenge Cup in 2018, after a final against AEK Athens.

Turda was promoted to the first division in 2011.

Potaissa Turda's fairytail story began back in 2007, when their home sports hall, Gheorghe Baritiu, was inaugurated and the team's players could play finally in Turda. For example, one of the squad's members was the actual team president, Flaviu Constantin Sâsâeac, who used to play for Turda, and also being the team president, since 2003.

Another reason why Potaissa's early success is not that surprising, can be that the club has more youth squads, around 220 children and young players representing Turda in national competitions.

== Kits ==
HOME

2019–20

AWAY

2021–22

== Current squad ==
Squad for the 2025–26 season

Goalkeepers

- (Romania) Adrian Baștiurea
- (Romania) Mihai Popescu
- (Romania) Alexandru Bucătaru

Wingers
RW

- (Romania) Roland Thalmaier
- (Romania) Daniel Pop

LW

- (Romania) Alexandru Ghivil
- (Romania) Denis Vereș

Line players

- (Romania) Gabriel Dumitriu
- (Romania) Paul Grindean
- (Poland) Mateusz Piechowski

Back players
LB

- (Romania) Radu Lazăr
- (Romania) Teodor Pinţoiu
- (Romania) George Pințoiu
- (Serbia) Ivan Mošić

CB

- (Romania) Alexandru Ghivil
- (Georgia (country)) Irakli Kbilashvili

RB

- (Romania) Radu Cristian Ghiță
- (Romania) Darius Rusu

=== Technical staff ===
- Head coach: (Romania) Horațiu Gal
- Assistant coach: (Romania) Ionuț Ștef
- Masseur: (Romania) Andreea Bărbos

=== Transfers ===
Transfers for the 2026–27 season

Joining

- (Cape Verde) Leandro Semedo (LB) from (Spain) Ángel Ximénez Puente Genil
- (Georgia (country)) Teimuraz Orjonikidze (LB) from (North Macedonia) GRK Ohrid

Leaving

- (Iran) Mehran Rahnama (LB) to (Spain) BM Villa de Aranda
- (Serbia) Ivan Mošić (LB) to (Romania) HC Buzău
- (Romania) Alexandru Bucătaru (GK) to (Romania) HC Buzău

=== Transfer History ===
Transfers for the 2025–26 season

Joining

- (Serbia) Ivan Mošić (LB) from (Romania) HC Buzău

Leaving

- (Iran) Mohammad Reza Oraei (RB) to (France) Istres Provence Handball
- (Serbia) Janja Vojvodić (CB) to (Romania) CSM București

== Honours ==
- EHF European Cup
  - Winners (1): 2017–18
  - Runners-up (1): 2016–17
- Liga Națională
  - Third place (4): 2014, 2017, 2018, 2019

== European record ==
Season	Competition	Round	Club	1st leg	2nd leg	Aggregate
2014–15	EHF Cup	Q1	(Israel) Maccabi Tel Aviv	32–25	35-30	67–55
2014–15	EHF Cup	Q2	(Italy) Junior Fasano	28-27	39-26	67–53
2014–15	EHF Cup	Q3	(Croatia) RK Nexe	20-35	26-23	46–58
2016–17	EHF Challenge Cup	R3	(Bulgaria) HC Dobrudja	32–23	43–19	75–42
2016–17	EHF Challenge Cup	1/8	(Luxembourg) Handball Esch	31–27	28–29	59–56
2016–17	EHF Challenge Cup	QF	(Luxembourg) HB Dudelange	32–29	36–35	68–64
2016–17	EHF Challenge Cup	SF	(Iceland) Valur	22–30	32–23	54–53
2016–17	EHF Challenge Cup	F	(Portugal) Sporting CP	28–37	24–30	52–67

For the first time in their short history, AHC Potaissa Turda have reached the Challenge Cup finals for the second year running. After the loss from a year before, against Sporting CP, Turda had the power to come back stronger, winning the first major trophy for the city from Cluj county. By beating AEK H.C. with 59-49 on aggregate, Potaissa Turda became the fourth team from Romania to ever lift the Challenge Cup, after Steaua Bucharest, UCM Reșița (three times between 2007 and 2009) and HC Odorhei.

Season	Competition	Round	Club	1st leg	2nd leg	Aggregate
2017–18	EHF Challenge Cup	R3	(Kosovo) KH Trepça	35-19	40-30	75–49
2017–18	EHF Challenge Cup	1/8	(Belgium) HC Visé BM	44-24	24-29	68–53
2017–18	EHF Challenge Cup	QF	(Norway) FyllingenBergen	29-24	30-32	59–56
2017–18	EHF Challenge Cup	SF	(Iceland) IBV Vestmannaeyjar	28-31	28-24	56–55
2017–18	EHF Challenge Cup	F	(Greece) AEK H.C.	33-22	26-27	59–49
2018–19	EHF Cup	Q1	(Portugal) FC Porto	21-41	24-27	45–68
2019–20	EHF Challenge Cup	R3	(Latvia) TENAX Dobele	38-35	32-32	70–67
2019–20	EHF Challenge Cup	1/8	(Switzerland) BSV Bern	36-33	33-35	69–68
2019–20	EHF Challenge Cup	QF	(Greece) AEK H.C.	CANCELLED		
2020–21	EHF European League	Q1	(Croatia) HRK Gorica	24–26	32–27	56–53
2020–21	EHF European League	Q2	(France) Fenix Toulouse Handball	35–35	27–31	62–66
2021–22	EHF European Cup	R3	(Kosovo) KH Besa Famgas	28–30	29–26	57–56
2021–22	EHF European Cup	L16	(Sweden) Alingsås HK	31–30	30–41	61–71
2022–23	EHF European League	Q1	(Sweden) IK Sävehof	21–45	30–34	51–79
2024–25	EHF European Cup	R2	(North Macedonia) GRK Ohrid	25–31	39–29	64–60
2024–25	EHF European Cup	R3	(Greece) Olympiacos SFP	27–32	31–27	58–59
2025–26	EHF European League	GS	(Spain) Irudek Bidasoa Irún	33–34	30–35	4th place
2025–26	EHF European League	GS	(France) Saint-Raphaël Var Handball	25–34	24–42	4th place
2025–26	EHF European League	GS	(Germany) SG Flensburg-Handewitt	26–33	28–46	4th place
2026–27	EHF European Cup	R1	(Bosnia and Herzegovina) RK Konjuh Živinice	24–20	26–24	50–44
2026–27	EHF European Cup	R2	(Belgium) Derdaele Sporting Pelt	29–27	33–27	62–54
2026–27	EHF European Cup	R3	(Norway) Runar Sandefjord	–	–	–
