= CSM Făgăraș (men's handball) =

Romanian men's handball team

- Full name: Clubul Sportiv Municipal Făgăraș
- Short name: Făgăraș
- Founded: 2015; 11 years ago
- Arena: Radu Negru
- Capacity: 500
- President: Daniel Gușeilă
- Head coach: Adrian Petrea
- League: Liga Națională
- 2018–19: Liga Națională, 11th
- Club colours
Home	Away

Clubul Sportiv Municipal Făgăraș, commonly known as CSM Făgăraș, is a men's handball team from Făgăraș, Brașov County, Romania. The club was founded in 2015 and promoted for the first time in Liga Națională after only one season.

== Kits ==
HOME
2018–19	2019-20	2020–21

AWAY
2018–19	2020–21

== Honours ==
- Divizia A:
  - Winners (1): 2016

== Team 2019-20 ==
Goalkeepers

- (Romania) Ștefan Grigoraș
- 01 (Romania) Radu Ivanov
- 16 (Romania) Răzvan Vîlceanu

Wingers

- 8 (Romania) Bogdan Dincă
- 14 (Romania) Claudiu Mînea
- 21 (Romania) Tiberiu Constantinescu
- 42 (Romania) Alin Câmpan
- (Romania) Cătălin Furak

Line players

- 17 (Romania) Alexandru Dedu
- (Romania) Leonard Ștefan
- 19 (Romania) George Roșca

Backs
LB

- 5 (Romania) Cosmin Capotă
- 41 (Romania) Ciprian Vancea

CB

- 10 (Romania) Emilian Turcu
- 13 (Romania) Răzvan Mateoniu

RB

- 27 (Romania) Nicolae Ungureanu
- 34 (Romania) Marius Bahan
