= CSM Vaslui (men's handball) =

Romanian men's handball team

- Full name: Club Sportiv Municipal Vaslui
- Short name: Vaslui
- Founded: 1974; 52 years ago
- Arena: Polyvalent Hall
- Capacity: 1,500
- President: (Romania) Bogdan Florea
- Head coach: vacant
- League: Liga Națională
- 2021–22: Liga Națională, 8th of 14
- Club colours
| Home | Away |

Club Sportiv Municipal Vaslui, commonly known as CSM Vaslui, is a men's handball team from Vaslui, Romania. The team was founded in 1974 and promoted back in the Liga Națională in 2014, after 15 years of absence.

The team represents the handball section of the multi-sport club CSM Vaslui, which also include basketball, athletics and football sections. The team plays its home matches at Vaslui Polyvalent Hall, a sports hall with a capacity of 1,500 people.

== History ==
Men's handball in Vaslui dates back to 1974, when professor Neculai Popa and a group of athletes founded Metalul Vaslui, financially supported by the Vaslui Mechanical Enterprise, earning promotion to Divizia B a year later.

Starting from 1982, the team was taken over by the Vaslui Synthetic Fiber Plant, and for ten seasons, the newly named Moldosin Vaslui established itself in the country's second tier. The golden era of men's handball in Vaslui spanned from 1992 to 1999, with Moldosin competing for seven consecutive years in the top national handball league. During this period, handball giants like Minaur, Steaua, Dinamo, and Fibrex Săvinești left Vaslui defeated, while the Sports Hall was consistently packed to capacity.

The team was promoted to the National League under the coaching duo of Paul Popescu and Liviu Gugleș. During their seven years in the league, other coaches also took charge, including Virgil Bedicov and Laurențiu Cozma (1996–1997), and Liviu Gugleș (1997–1999).

From the golden generation, notable players include Adrian Gavrilă, Gabriel Mardare, Gabriel Cozma, Lilian Cosma, Leonard Bibirig, and Vasile Cocuz, who won a bronze medal at the 1990 World Championship. The emblematic player of Vaslui handball remains Leonard Bibirig, who was also a member and captain of the national team.

Moldosin Vaslui also had a European presence. In 1994, the handball team participated in the City Cup Round of 32, facing the Slovak team Polnohospodar Topolcany. Unfortunately, the team's European journey ended after this double-header.

With the economic collapse of the Synthetic Fiber Plant, the team was relegated to the second league, a period during which the Vaslui team was coached by Adrian Gavrilă, Paul Popescu, and Costică Crăciun.

== Honours ==
Divizia A:

- Winners (2): 2014, 2019

== Kits ==
HOME

2019–20

AWAY

2017–18

== Team ==
=== Current squad ===
Squad for the 2025–26 season

Goalkeepers
Left Wingers
Right Wingers
Line players

Left Backs
Central Backs

- (Lithuania) Aidenas Malašinskas

Right Backs

=== Transfers ===
Transfers for the 2026–27 season

Joining

- (Belarus) Yahor Budzeika (RB) from (Belarus) HC Meshkov Brest
- (Hungary) Bence Hornyák (RW) from (Germany) TuS N-Lübbecke
- (Romania) Andrei Gopsa (RB) from (Romania) HC Buzău
- (Romania) Florin Sirghie (GK) from (Romania) CSU Suceava

Leaving

- (Romania) Adrian Tenghea (GK) to (Romania) CS Universitatea Cluj
- (Romania) Ciprian Aungurenci (RW) to (Romania) CSO Teutonii Ghimbav
- (Romania) Andrei Popa (LW) to (Romania) CSO Teutonii Ghimbav

=== Transfer History ===
Transfers for the 2025–26 season

Joining

- (Lithuania) Aidenas Malašinskas (CB) from (Romania) HC Buzău

Leaving

- (Montenegro) Danilo Mihaljević (GK) to (Slovakia) HT Tatran Prešov
