= CSM București (men's handball) =

Men's handball team from Bucharest, Romania

- Full name: Clubul Sportiv Municipal București
- Short name: CSM
- Founded: 2007; 19 years ago
- Arena: Dinamo Polyvalent Hall
- Capacity: 5,300
- President: Gabriela Szabo
- Head coach: Eliodor Voica
- League: Liga Națională
- 2023–24: Liga Națională, 5th of 14
- Club colours
Home	Away

CSM București is a men's handball team from Bucharest, Romania, that plays in the Romanian Liga Naţională. Their biggest achievement is winning the Romanian Cup once, in 2016. It functions as the men's handball department of the multi-sport club CSM București.

== History ==
The parent sports club, CSM București, was established on 19 June 2007 by decision of the General Council of Bucharest. The men's handball section began competing in the Romanian league system before earning promotion to the Liga Națională. Between 2014 and 2017, CSM București finished as runners-up in the Romanian championship on three consecutive occasions. In 2016, the club won the Romanian Cup for the first time after defeating Steaua București 27–24 in the final, held in Brăila.

During the 2018–19 season, CSM București won the EHF Challenge Cup, the club's first European title. In the quarter-finals, CSM București eliminated RK Borac Banja Luka, before defeating HC Neva Saint Petersburg in the semi-finals. In the final, the Romanian club faced A.M. Madeira Andebol SAD. Following a 22–22 draw in the first leg in Funchal, CSM București won the return leg in Bucharest 26–20 on 18 May 2019 to secure the title.

Location of CSM București
Location of CSM București

== Kits ==
HOME
2014–15	2015–16	2016–17	2017–18	2018-19	2019–20	2020-

AWAY
2014–15	2015–16	2019–20	2020-

== Honours ==
=== Domestic competitions ===
- Liga Națională
  - Second place: 2015, 2016, 2017
- Cupa României
  - Winners: 2016
  - Bronze Medalist: 2017
- Supercupa României
  - Finalist: 2016

=== European competitions ===
- EHF European Cup:
  - Winners: 2018–19

== Team ==
=== Current squad ===
Squad for the 2025–26 season

Goalkeepers

- 1 (Romania) Andrei Lazăr
- 12 (Romania) Ionuț Grosu
- 16 (Romania) Valentin Petrila

Right Wingers

- 5 (Romania) Andrei Mihalcea
- 91 (Romania) Razvan Chiratcu

Left Wingers

- 23 (Romania) Mihai Nica
- 27 (Romania) Claudiu Babă

Line players

- 3 (Romania) Bogdan Oancea
- 6 (Romania) Zamfir Dumitrana
- 13 (Romania) Adrian Rotaru

Backs
LB

- 4 (Norway) André Pung Tuzov
- 7 (Romania) Bogdan Voica
- 14 (Sweden) Markus Stegefelt
- 99 (Romania) Alex Dascalu

CB

- 20 (Romania) Andrei Drăgan
- 26 (Serbia) Vanja Vojvodic
- 33 (Romania) Antonio Nedea

RB

- 18 (Romania) Mihai Alexandru Tene
- 37 (Romania) Mario Ciu
- (Romania) Bogdan Mănescu

=== Transfers ===
Transfers for the 2026–27 season

Joining

- (Poland) Damian Przytuła (LB) from (Croatia) RK Zagreb
- (Ukraine) Danylo Hlushak (RW) from (Romania) CSM Sighişoara
- (Spain) Domingo Luís (RB) from (Spain) Ángel Ximénez Puente Genil
- (Romania) Andrei Nicușor Negru (LW) from (Romania) Dinamo București
- (Romania) Dan Vasile (GK) from (Romania) SCM Politehnica Timișoara

Leaving

- (Norway) André Pung Tuzov (LB) to (Sweden) OV Helsingborg HK

=== Transfer History ===
Transfers for the 2025–26 season

Joining

- (Sweden) Markus Stegefelt (LB) from (Switzerland) GC Amicitia Zürich
- (Serbia) Janja Vojvodić (CB) from (Romania) AHC Potaissa Turda
- (Norway) André Pung Tuzov (LB) from (France) Dijon Métropole Handball
- (Romania) Andrei Drăgan (CB) from (Romania) CSM Constanța
- (Romania) Bogdan Mănescu (RB) from (Romania) CSM Bacău
- (Romania) Andrei Lazăr (GK) from (Romania) CSM Făgăraș
- (Romania) Claudiu Babă (LW) from (Romania) CSM Sighişoara
- (Romania) Mario Ciu (RB) back from loan at (Romania) CSM Sighişoara

Leaving

- (Brazil) Raul Nantes (LB) to (Romania) SCM Politehnica Timișoara
- (Moldova) Roman Dodica (RB) to (Romania) Dinamo București
- (Ukraine) Vitalii Shimanskyi (GK) to (Romania) CSM Constanța
- (Romania) Liviu Caba (CB) to (Serbia) RK Partizan
