= Liga Națională (men's handball) =

Romanian men's handball league

- Current season, competition or edition: 2025–26 Liga Națională (men's handball)
- Sport: Handball
- Founded: 1933; 93 years ago (in 11 players); 1958; 68 years ago (in 7 players)
- First season: 1958–59
- No. of teams: 12
- Country: Romania
- Confederation: EHF
- Most recent champion: Dinamo București (22) (2025–26)
- Most titles: Steaua București (28)
- Broadcaster: Pro Arena
- Relegation to: Divizia A
- International cups: Champions League; Cup Winners' Cup; EHF Cup; Challenge Cup
- Website: FRH.ro

The Romanian Handball League, commonly known as Liga Națională or more recently as Liga Zimbrilor, is the men's top Romanian professional handball league. The league comprises twelve teams.

== History ==
This sport was first played in Romania in 1920. After a visit in Germany, a few physical education teachers introduced this sport in their classes. The Liga Națională was founded in 1933 (in 11 players) and in 1958 in the current format with 7 players. The most successful team in history is Steaua București with 28 titles. The current champions are Dinamo București.

== Broadcasting rights ==
The matches are broadcast by Pro Arena.

== Current teams ==
=== Teams for season 2025–26 ===
Location of teams in 2025–26 Liga Națională
- CS Minaur Baia Mare
- CSM București
- Dinamo București
- HC Buzău
- CSM Constanța
- Universitatea Cluj
- CSM Sighişoara
- CSU Suceava
- Poli Timișoara
- Potaissa Turda
- CSM Vaslui

== Top scorers ==
- 2017–18: (Romania) Gabriel Bujor – HC Vaslui (202)
- 2016–17: (Romania) Gabriel Bujor – HC Vaslui (222)
- 2015–16: (Romania) Gabriel Florea – CSA Steaua București (221)
- 2013–14: (Romania) Claudiu Dediu – ASC Potaissa Turda (195)
- 2012–13: (Romania) Andrei Grasu – CS Universitatea Politehnica Timişoara (154)
- 2011–12: (Romania) Darius Apolzan – Energia Lignitul Pandurii Târgu Jiu (176)
- 2010–11: (Romania) Gabriel Florea – Energia Lignitul Pandurii Târgu Jiu (200)

== Past seasons ==
Year (season)	Champion	2. place	3. place
1958–59	Dinamo București	Rapid București	Ştiinţa Timişoara
1959–60	Dinamo București	Rapid București	CCA București
1960–61	Dinamo București	Ştiinţa Timişoara	Tehnometal Timişoara
1961–62	Dinamo București	Steaua București	Tehnometal Timişoara
1962–63	Steaua București	Dinamo București	Dinamo Braşov
1963–64	Dinamo București	Steaua București	Dinamo Braşov
1964–65	Dinamo București	Steaua București	Dinamo Braşov
1965–66	Dinamo București	Steaua București	Universitatea București
1966–67	Steaua București	Dinamo București	Politehnica Timişoara
1967–68	Steaua București	Dinamo București	Dinamo Bacău
1968–69	Steaua București	Dinamo București	Universitatea Cluj
1969–70	Steaua București	Dinamo București	Universitatea Cluj
1970–71	Steaua București	Dinamo București	Universitatea București
1971–72	Steaua București	Dinamo București	Universitatea București
1972–73	Steaua București	Universitatea București	Dinamo București
1973–74	Steaua București	Dinamo București	Minaur Baia Mare
1974–75	Steaua București	Dinamo București	Minaur Baia Mare
1975–76	Steaua București	Dinamo București	Minaur Baia Mare
1976–77	Steaua București	Dinamo București	Dinamo Ploieşti
1977–78	Dinamo București	Steaua București	Minaur Baia Mare
1978–79	Steaua București	Politehnica Timişoara	Dinamo București
1979–80	Steaua București	Minaur Baia Mare	Știința Bacău
1980–81	Steaua București	Minaur Baia Mare	Dinamo București
1981–82	Steaua București	Dinamo București	Minaur Baia Mare
1982–83	Steaua București	Dinamo București	Minaur Baia Mare
1983–84	Steaua București	Dinamo București	Minaur Baia Mare
1984–85	Steaua București	Minaur Baia Mare	Politehnica Timişoara
1985–86	Dinamo București	Steaua București	Politehnica Timişoara
1986–87	Steaua București	Politehnica Timişoara	Minaur Baia Mare
1987–88	Steaua București	Dinamo București	Minaur Baia Mare
1988–89	Steaua București	Dinamo București	Minaur Baia Mare
1989–90	Steaua București	Dinamo București	Minaur Baia Mare
1990–91	Politehnica Timişoara	Dinamo București	Universitatea Craiova
1991–92	Universitatea Craiova	Minaur Baia Mare	Steaua București
1992–93	Universitatea Craiova	Minaur Baia Mare	Steaua București
1993–94	Steaua București	Minaur Baia Mare	Universitatea Craiova
1994–95	Dinamo București	Minaur Baia Mare	Universitatea Craiova
1995–96	Steaua București	Fibrex Piatra Neamţ	Minaur Baia Mare
1996–97	Dinamo București	Steaua București	Minaur Baia Mare
1997–98	Minaur Baia Mare	Fibrex Săvineşti	Steaua București
1998–99	Minaur Baia Mare	Steaua București	Fibrex Săvineşti
1999–00	Steaua București	Fibrex Săvineşti	Universitatea Cluj
2000–01	Steaua București	Fibrex Săvineşti	Dinamo București
2001–02	Fibrex Săvineşti	Dinamo București	HCM Constanța
2002–03	Fibrex Săvineşti	Dinamo București	Minaur Baia Mare
2003–04	HCM Constanța	Dinamo București	Minaur Baia Mare
2004–05	Dinamo București	HCM Constanța	Minaur Baia Mare
2005–06	HCM Constanța	Dinamo București	Steaua București
2006–07	HCM Constanța	Steaua București	Dinamo București
2007–08	Steaua București	HCM Constanța	UCM Reșița
2008–09	HCM Constanța	UCM Reșița	Dinamo București
2009–10	HCM Constanța	UCM Reșița	Pandurii Târgu Jiu
2010–11	HCM Constanța	Odorheiu Secuiesc	Bucovina Suceava
2011–12	HCM Constanța	Știința Bacău	Odorheiu Secuiesc
2012–13	HCM Constanța	Știința Bacău	Odorheiu Secuiesc
2013–14	HCM Constanța	Știința Bacău	Potaissa Turda
2014–15	Minaur Baia Mare	CSM București	Dinamo București
2015–16	Dinamo București	CSM București	Politehnica Timişoara
2016–17	Dinamo București	CSM București	Potaissa Turda
2017–18	Dinamo București	Steaua București	Potaissa Turda
2018–19	Dinamo București	Dobrogea Sud Constanța	Potaissa Turda
2019–20	Stopped because of COVID-19 pandemic		
2020–21	Dinamo București	AHC Potaissa Turda	Dobrogea Sud Constanța
2021–22	Dinamo București	Minaur Baia Mare	Dobrogea Sud Constanța
2022–23	Dinamo București	Minaur Baia Mare	CSM Constanța
2023–24	Dinamo București	CSM Constanța	Minaur Baia Mare
2024–25	Dinamo București	AHC Potaissa Turda	HC Buzău
2025–26	Dinamo București	HC Buzău	CSM București

== Performances by club ==
Club	Titles	Years won
Steaua București	28	1963, 1967, 1968, 1969, 1970, 1971, 1972, 1973, 1974, 1975, 1976, 1977, 1979, 1980, 1981, 1982, 1983, 1984, 1985, 1987, 1988, 1989, 1990, 1994, 1996, 2000, 2001, 2008
Dinamo București	22	1959, 1960, 1961, 1962, 1964, 1965, 1966, 1978, 1986, 1995, 1997, 2005, 2016, 2017, 2018, 2019, 2021, 2022, 2023, 2024, 2025, 2026
HCM Constanța	9	2004, 2006, 2007, 2009, 2010, 2011, 2012, 2013, 2014
Minaur Baia Mare	3	1998, 1999, 2015
Universitatea Craiova	2	1992, 1993
Fibrex Săvineşti	2	2002, 2003
Politehnica Timișoara	1	1991

== EHF coefficient ranking ==
For the 2019–20 season, see footnote

- 9. ▲ (12) (Belarus) Chempiyanat 1 (25.56)
- 10. ▼ (8) (Croatia) Croatian Premijer liga (32.00)
- 11. (11) (Romania) Liga Națională (30.44)
- 12. ▼ (10) (Slovenia) Liga NLB (29.33)
- 13. ▲ (14) (Ukraine) Ukrainian Men's Handball Super League (26.11)

Seasonal Coefficient Ranking Graph :

Year	2008–09	2009–10	2010–11	2011–12	2012–13	2013–14	2014–15	2015–16	2016–17	2017–18	2018–19
Rank	10	▲9	9	9	9	▼10	▼13	▲12	▲9	▼12	▲11

== See also ==
- Romanian Women's Handball League
