= 2009 World Men's Handball Championship squads =

The 2009 World Men's Handball Championship squads. Each team consisted of 16 players.

Appearances, goals and ages as of tournament start, 16 January 2009.

== Group A ==
=== France ===
Head coach: (France) Claude Onesta

Players

No.	Pos.	Name	Date of birth (age)	Height	App.	Goals	Club
2	LB	Jérôme Fernandez	7 March 1977 (aged 31)	1.99 m			(Spain) BM Ciudad Real
3	P	Didier Dinart	18 January 1977 (aged 31)	1.97 m			(Spain) BM Ciudad Real
5	CB	Guillaume Gille	12 July 1976 (aged 32)	1.92 m			(Germany) HSV Hamburg
8	CB	Daniel Narcisse	16 December 1979 (aged 29)	1.89 m			(France) Chambéry SMB
9	RW	Guillaume Joli	27 March 1985 (aged 23)	1.78 m			(France) Chambéry SMB
12	GK	Daouda Karaboué	11 December 1975 (aged 33)	1.98 m			(France) Montpellier Handball
13	CB	Nikola Karabatić	11 April 1984 (aged 24)	1.96 m			(Germany) THW Kiel
14	P	Christophe Kempé	2 May 1975 (aged 33)	1.93 m			(France) Fenix Toulouse Handball
15	LB	Franck Junillon	28 November 1978 (aged 30)	1.95 m			(Germany) MT Melsungen
16	GK	Thierry Omeyer	2 November 1976 (aged 32)	1.92 m			(Germany) THW Kiel
18	RW	Joël Abati	25 April 1970 (aged 38)	1.90 m			(France) Montpellier Handball
19	RW	Luc Abalo	6 September 1984 (aged 24)	1.82 m			(Spain) BM Ciudad Real
20	P	Cédric Sorhaindo	7 June 1984 (aged 24)	1.86 m			(France) Paris Saint-Germain
21	LW	Michaël Guigou	28 January 1982 (aged 26)	1.80 m			(France) Montpellier Handball
23	RB	Sébastien Bosquet	24 February 1979 (aged 29)	1.98 m			(France) Montpellier Handball
24	LW	Sébastien Ostertag	16 March 1979 (aged 29)	1.73 m			Tremblay-en-France Handball

=== Hungary ===
Head coach: (Hungary) János Hajdul

Players

No.	Pos.	Name	Date of birth (age)	Height	App.	Goals	Club
1	GK	Nenad Puljezević	13 March 1973 (aged 35)	1.95 m			(Hungary) MOL-Pick Szeged
3	LB	Ferenc Ilyés	20 December 1981 (aged 27)	1.98 m			(Hungary) Telekom Veszprém
5	CB	Gábor Császár	16 June 1984 (aged 24)	1.86 m			(Denmark) Viborg HK
6	RB	Tamás Mocsai	9 December 1978 (aged 30)	1.96 m			(Germany) TBV Lemgo
7	P	Gyula Gál	18 August 1976 (aged 32)	1.94 m			(Hungary) Telekom Veszprém
8	LW	Gergő Iváncsik	30 November 1981 (aged 27)	1.90 m			(Hungary) Telekom Veszprém
9	RW	Tamás Iváncsik	3 April 1983 (aged 25)	1.79 m			(Hungary) Telekom Veszprém
10	RW	Gergely Harsányi	3 May 1981 (aged 27)	1.91 m			(Hungary) PLER KC
11	LB	Barna Putics	18 August 1984 (aged 24)	2.01 m			(Slovenia) RK Koper
12	GK	Nándor Fazekas	16 October 1976 (aged 32)	1.92 m			(Germany) VfL Gummersbach
13	LB	Dávid Katzirz	25 June 1980 (aged 28)	1.94 m			(Hungary) MOL-Pick Szeged
15	LW	Szabolcs Törő	10 March 1983 (aged 25)	1.83 m			(Hungary) Dunaferr SE
19	RB	László Nagy	3 March 1981 (aged 27)	2.08 m			(Spain) FC Barcelona
21	P	Gábor Herbert	6 February 1979 (aged 29)	1.94 m			(Hungary) MOL-Pick Szeged
23	CB	Nikola Eklemović	8 February 1978 (aged 30)	1.93 m			(Hungary) Telekom Veszprém
25	P	Szabolcs Zubai	31 March 1984 (aged 24)	1.91 m			(Hungary) MOL-Pick Szeged

=== Slovakia ===
Head coach: (Slovakia) Zoltán Heister

Players

No.	Pos.	Name	Date of birth (age)	Height	App.	Goals	Club
1	GK	Téodor Paul	22 April 1987 (aged 21)	1.95 m			(Hungary) Ferencvárosi TC
3	LB	Csaba Szücs	28 July 1987 (aged 21)	2.03 m			(Germany) HSG Nordhorn-Lingen
4	CB	Peter Kukučka	20 July 1982 (aged 26)	1.88 m			(Germany) HSG Nordhorn-Lingen
5	CB	František Šulc	13 December 1978 (aged 30)	1.86 m			(Germany) HSG Düsseldorf
6	RB	Peter Vozar	27 March 1976 (aged 32)	2.03 m			(Germany) HG Saarlouis
7	LB	Juraj Niznan	6 October 1983 (aged 25)	1.93 m			(Germany) HSG Nordhorn-Lingen
8	RW	Tomáš Urban	17 August 1989 (aged 19)	1.88 m			(Slovakia) Tatran Presov
9	RB	Daniel Valo	7 May 1979 (aged 29)	2.03 m			(Germany) MT Melsungen
10	P	Michal Kopčo	27 January 1988 (aged 20)	1.95 m			(Hungary) Dunaferr SE
12	GK	Richard Štochl	17 December 1975 (aged 33)	2.00 m			(Hungary) Dunaferr SE
13	LB	Radovan Pekar	27 December 1980 (aged 28)	1.99 m			(Slovakia) Tatran Presov
14	P	Andrej Petro	28 January 1986 (aged 22)	1.97 m			(Slovakia) HKM Šaľa
16	GK	Michal Shejbal	23 January 1985 (aged 23)	1.96 m			(Sweden) IFK Skövde HK
22	RW	Tomáš Straňovský	29 September 1980 (aged 28)	1.80 m			(Slovakia) Tatran Presov
23	LW	Radoslav Antl	2 March 1978 (aged 30)	1.80 m			(Switzerland) ZMC Amicitia Zürich
24	LW	Martin Straňovský	12 September 1985 (aged 23)	1.87 m			(Spain) Ademar León

=== Romania ===
Head coach: (Romania) Aihan Omer

Players

No.	Pos.	Name	Date of birth (age)	Height	App.	Goals	Club
1	GK	Ionuț Stănescu	14 August 1979 (aged 29)	1.96 m			(Romania) HCM Constanța
6	LW	Mihai Timofte	1 December 1979 (aged 29)	1.87 m			(Romania) HCM Constanța
7	LW	George Ionut Buricea	1 August 1979 (aged 29)	1.79 m			(Romania) HCM Constanța
8	LB	Florin Cornel Nicolae	11 August 1980 (aged 28)	1.88 m			(Romania) HCM Constanța
9	LB	Adrian Danut Petrea	28 June 1978 (aged 30)	1.96 m			(Hungary) MOL-Pick Szeged
11	CB	Marius Stavrositu	3 September 1980 (aged 28)	1.82 m			(Romania) HCM Constanța
14	RW	Laurențiu Toma	28 June 1981 (aged 27)	1.94 m			(Romania) HCM Constanța
15	RW	Valentin Ghionea	29 May 1984 (aged 24)	1.97 m			(Hungary) MOL-Pick Szeged
16	GK	Mihai Popescu	15 March 1985 (aged 23)	1.90 m			(Romania) HCM Constanța
18	P	Eremia Piriianu	16 October 1975 (aged 33)	1.94 m			(Romania) C.S. UCM Resita
20	RB	Rareș Jurcă	29 April 1983 (aged 25)	1.94 m			(Germany) Frisch Auf Göppingen
22	P	Gheorghe Irimescu	13 September 1980 (aged 28)	1.86 m			(Romania) C.S. UCM Resita
23	CB	Dan Mihai Rohozneanu	17 September 1984 (aged 24)	1.86 m			(Romania) Resita
27	RB	Sandu Florin Iacob	12 March 1977 (aged 31)	1.89 m			(Romania) Stiinta Municipal Dedeman Bacau
32	GK	Sorin Barza	18 January 1976 (aged 32)	2.02 m			(Romania) HC Odorheiu Secuiesc
82	LW	Marian Cozma	8 September 1982 (aged 26)	2.11 m			(Hungary) Telekom Veszprém

=== Argentina ===
Head coach: (Argentina) Eduardo Gallardo

Players

No.	Pos.	Name	Date of birth (age)	Height	App.	Goals	Club
1	GK	Matías Schulz	12 February 1982 (aged 26)	1.90 m			(Spain) Helvetia Anaitasuna
2	P	Sergio Crevatin	28 May 1980 (aged 28)	1.86 m			(Argentina) S.A.G. Lomas de Zamora Handball
3	RW	Federico Pizarro	7 September 1986 (aged 22)	1.83 m			(Argentina) SEDALO
4	CB	Sebastián Simonet	12 May 1986 (aged 22)	1.90 m			(Spain) Torrevieja
5	P	Pablo Sebastián Portela	21 June 1980 (aged 28)	1.92 m			(Argentina) River Plate
7	GK	Andrés Kogovsek	7 January 1974 (aged 35)	1.90 m			(Spain) BM Antequera
8	CB	Eric Gull	28 August 1973 (aged 35)	2.04 m			(Qatar) Al-Sadd Sports Club
9	RB	Leonardo Facundo Querín	17 April 1982 (aged 26)	1.97 m			(France) US Ivry
10	CB	Mariano Castro	28 July 1986 (aged 22)	1.90 m			(Argentina) CDFC Mitre
11	RW	Facundo Torres	24 February 1979 (aged 29)	1.80 m			(Argentina) Municipalidad San Miguel
12	GK	Fernando Garcia	31 August 1981 (aged 27)	1.90 m			(Italy) A.S. Albatros
13	CB	Juan Pablo Fernández	30 September 1988 (aged 20)	1.92 m			(Spain) Anaitasuna
14	LB	Agustín Vidal	8 July 1987 (aged 21)	1.94 m			(Spain) Guadalajara
15	P	Gonzalo Carou	15 August 1979 (aged 29)	1.93 m			(Spain) Ademar León
17	LW	Damián Migueles	24 November 1983 (aged 25)	1.93 m			(France) Cesson
19	CB	Gonzalo Viscovich	27 November 1976 (aged 32)	1.87 m			(Spain) BM Valladolid

=== Australia ===
Head coach: (Norway) Morten Fjeldstad

- Ognjen Latinovic
- Bojan Stojanovic
- James Blondell
- Tommy Fletcher
- Taip Ramadani
- Machael Thomas
- Lee Schofield
- Ognjen Matic
- Bevan Calvert
- Daniel Kelly
- Dimitrios Varkanitsas
- Curtis Eitzen
- Richard Ridley
- Mladen Turanjanin
- Nemanja Subotic
- Dragan Jerkov

== Group B ==
=== Croatia ===
Head coach: (Croatia) : Lino Červar

No.	Pos.	Name	Date of birth (age)	Height	App.	Goals	Club
1	GK	Venio Losert	25 July 1976 (aged 32)	1.91 m			(Spain) FC Barcelona
25	GK	Mirko Alilović		2.00 m			(Spain) Ademar León
2	LW	Mateo Hrvatin	15 August 1980 (aged 28)	1.81 m			(Croatia) RK Zamet
7	RW	Vedran Zrnić	26 September 1979 (aged 29)	1.88 m			(Germany) VfL Gummersbach
27	RW	Ivan Čupić	27 March 1986 (aged 22)	1.78 m			(Slovenia) RK Gorenje Velenje
13	RW	Zlatko Horvat	25 September 1984 (aged 24)	1.79 m			(Croatia) RK Zagreb
17	LW	Goran Šprem	6 July 1979 (aged 29)	1.83 m			(Germany) HSG Nordhorn
6	ARG	Blaženko Lacković	25 December 1980 (aged 28)	1.95 m			(Germany) HSV Hamburg
8	ARD	Marko Kopljar	12 February 1986 (aged 22)	2.10 m			(Croatia) RK Zagreb
0	ARG	Jakov Gojun	18 April 1986 (aged 22)	2.03 m			(Croatia) RK Siscia
19	ARD	Petar Metličić	25 December 1976 (aged 32)	1.94 m			(Spain) BM Ciudad Real
24	ARG	Tonči Valčić	9 June 1978 (aged 30)	1.94 m			(Croatia) RK Zagreb
18	ARG	Denis Špoljarić	20 August 1979 (aged 29)	1.94 m			(Croatia) RK Zagreb
	ARD	Denis Buntić	13 October 1982 (aged 26)	1.98 m			(Spain) Ademar León
4	CB	Ivano Balić	1 April 1979 (aged 29)	1.90 m			(Croatia) RK Zagreb
5	CB	Domagoj Duvnjak	1 June 1988 (aged 20)	1.97 m			(Croatia) RK Zagreb
22	CB	Josip Valčić	21 April 1984 (aged 24)	1.90 m			(Croatia) RK Zagreb
9	P	Igor Vori	20 September 1980 (aged 28)	2.02 m			(Croatia) RK Zagreb
	P	Dalibor Anušić	7 April 1976 (aged 32)	1.98 m			(Germany) Frisch Auf Göppingen

=== Sweden ===
7th

- Andreas Palicka
- Johan Sjöstrand
- Per Sandström
- Henrik Lundström
- Jonas Källman
- Jan Lennartsson
- Kim Andersson
- Oscar Carlén
- Johan Jakobsson
- Jonathan Stenbäcken
- Dalibor Doder
- Jonas Larholm
- Patrik Fahlgren
- Lukas Karlsson
- Mattias Gustafsson
- Magnus Jernemyr
- Robert Arrhenius
- Tobias Karlsson

=== South Korea ===
Head coach: (South Korea) Choi Tae-sup

- Yong Minho
- Jeong Yi-kyeong
- Sim Jaebok
- Kim Tea-wan
- Park Jung-geu
- Park Chan-yong
- Lee Sanguk
- Park Chan-young
- Oh Yun-suk
- Kang Il-koo
- Cho Hyun-chul
- Yu Dong-geun
- Yoon Ciyeol
- Lee Eunho
- Lee Junhee
- Lee Jae-woo

== Group C ==
=== Germany ===
Head coach: (Germany) Heiner Brand

No.	Pos.	Name	Date of birth (age)	Height	App.	Goals	Club
1	GK	Johannes Bitter	14 May 1982 (aged 26)	2.04 m	104	2	(Germany) HSV Hamburg
2	LB	Pascal Hens	1 August 1980 (aged 28)	2.03 m	156	460	(Germany) HSV Hamburg
4	P	Oliver Roggisch	18 September 1978 (aged 30)	2.02 m	104	25	(Germany) Rhein-Neckar Löwen
5	LW	Dominik Klein	3 February 1983 (aged 25)	1.90 m	84	174	(Germany) THW Kiel
6	CB	Michael Müller	3 April 1984 (aged 24)	1.97 m	13	26	(Germany) TV Großwallstadt
7	CB	Martin Strobel	24 July 1986 (aged 22)	1.89 m	20	39	(Germany) TBV Lemgo
8	P	Sebastian Preiß	22 October 1981 (aged 27)	1.95 m	106	251	(Germany) TBV Lemgo
9	P	Jens Tiedtke	9 June 1979 (aged 29)	1.96 m	55	81	(Germany) TV Großwallstadt
11	RB	Holger Glandorf	17 March 1983 (aged 25)	1.95 m	99	338	(Germany) HSG Nordhorn-Lingen
12	GK	Silvio Heinevetter	9 September 1984 (aged 24)	1.94 m	10	0	(Germany) SC Magdeburg
13	LB	Sven-Sören Christophersen	30 October 1985 (aged 23)	1.98 m	16	30	(Germany) HSG Wetzlar
15	LW	Torsten Jansen	26 November 1976 (aged 32)	1.85 m	154	416	(Germany) HSV Hamburg
16	GK	Carsten Lichtlein	4 November 1980 (aged 28)	2.02 m	100	1	(Germany) TBV Lemgo
19	RW	Christian Schöne	6 February 1981 (aged 27)	1.88 m	63	79	(Germany) Frisch Auf Göppingen
21	LB	Lars Kaufmann	19 December 1982 (aged 26)	1.99 m	61	113	(Germany) TBV Lemgo
22	RW	Christian Sprenger	18 April 1981 (aged 27)	1.87 m	32	58	(Germany) SC Magdeburg

== Group D ==
=== Denmark ===
Head coach: (Denmark) Ulrik Wilbek

No.	Pos.	Name	Date of birth (age)	Height	App.	Goals	Club
1	GK	Kasper Hvidt	6 February 1976 (aged 32)	1.92 m			(Spain) FC Barcelona
12	GK	Niklas Landin	19 December 1988 (aged 20)	2.00 m			(Denmark) GOG Svendborg TGI
9	LW	Lars Christiansen	18 April 1972 (aged 36)	1.82 m			(Germany) SG Flensburg-Handewitt
11	LW	Anders Eggert	14 May 1982 (aged 26)	1.79 m			(Denmark) Skjern Håndbold
24	RW	Hans Lindberg	1 August 1981 (aged 27)	1.86 m			(Germany) HSV Hamburg
4	LB	Lasse Boesen	18 September 1979 (aged 29)	1.93 m			(Germany) SG Flensburg-Handewitt
6	LB	Lars T. Jørgensen	3 February 1978 (aged 30)	1.93 m			(Spain) Portland San Antonio
10	RB	Klaus Bruun Jørgensen	3 April 1974 (aged 34)	1.93 m			(Denmark) FCK Håndbold
13	LB	Bo Spellerberg	24 July 1979 (aged 29)	1.92 m			(Denmark) KIF Kolding
18	LB	Mikkel Hansen	22 October 1987 (aged 21)	1.92 m			(Spain) FC Barcelona
22	RB	Kasper Søndergaard	9 June 1981 (aged 27)	1.90 m			(Denmark) Bjerringbro-Silkeborg
27	RB	Mads Øris Nielsen	17 March 1981 (aged 27)	1.98 m			(Denmark) Bjerringbro-Silkeborg
2	CB	Thomas Mogensen	9 September 1983 (aged 25)	1.86 m			(Germany) SG Flensburg-Handewitt
7	CB	Jesper Jensen	30 October 1977 (aged 31)	1.88 m			(Denmark) Skjern Håndbold
5	P	Torsten Laen	26 November 1979 (aged 29)	1.98 m			(Spain) BM Ciudad Real
14	P	Michael Knudsen	4 November 1978 (aged 30)	1.89 m			(Germany) SG Flensburg-Handewitt

=== Egypt ===
Head coach: (Croatia) Irfan Smajlagić

No.	Pos.	Name	Date of birth (age)	Height	App.	Goals	Club
5		Moustafa Hussein	8 January 1984 (aged 25)	1.96 m	39		(Egypt) Al Ahly
6		Ahmed El-Ahmar	27 January 1984 (aged 24)	1.84 m	51		(Egypt) Zamalek
7		Mohamed Shebib	1 April 1989 (aged 19)	1.95 m	2		(Egypt) Zamalek
8		Mohamed Ramadan	7 March 1984 (aged 24)	1.90 m	48		(Egypt) Al Ahly
9		Amr El-Kalioby	1 January 1987 (aged 22)	1.90 m	5		(Egypt) Al Ahly
10		Abou Abdel Razek	12 February 1987 (aged 21)	1.85 m	12		(Egypt) Smouha SC
12	GK	Mohamed Bakir El-Nakib	6 April 1974 (aged 34)	1.92 m	190		(France) Paris Handball
13		Karim Osman	17 November 1982 (aged 26)	1.86 m	7		(Egypt) Al Ahly
14		Hassan Mabrouk	29 July 1982 (aged 26)	1.87 m	63		(Egypt) Al Ahly
15		Mohamed Hassan	12 January 1982 (aged 27)	1.90 m	93		(Egypt) Zamalek
16	GK	Walid Abdel Maksoud	14 June 1979 (aged 29)	1.93 m	63		(Egypt) Zamalek
18		Hany El-Fakharany	6 April 1978 (aged 30)	1.84 m	117		(Germany) Füchse Berlin
19		Hassan Yousry	10 May 1978 (aged 30)	1.88 m	142		(Egypt) Zamalek
20		Hussein Zaky	1 March 1979 (aged 29)	1.94 m	142		(Spain) CAI Aragón
21		Mahmoud Hassan	9 November 1984 (aged 24)	1.92 m			(Egypt) Aviation
22	GK	Ismail El-Sayed	20 December 1984 (aged 24)	1.91 m	25		(Egypt) Al Ahly
