= Alexandru Csepreghi =

Romanian handball player (born 1987)

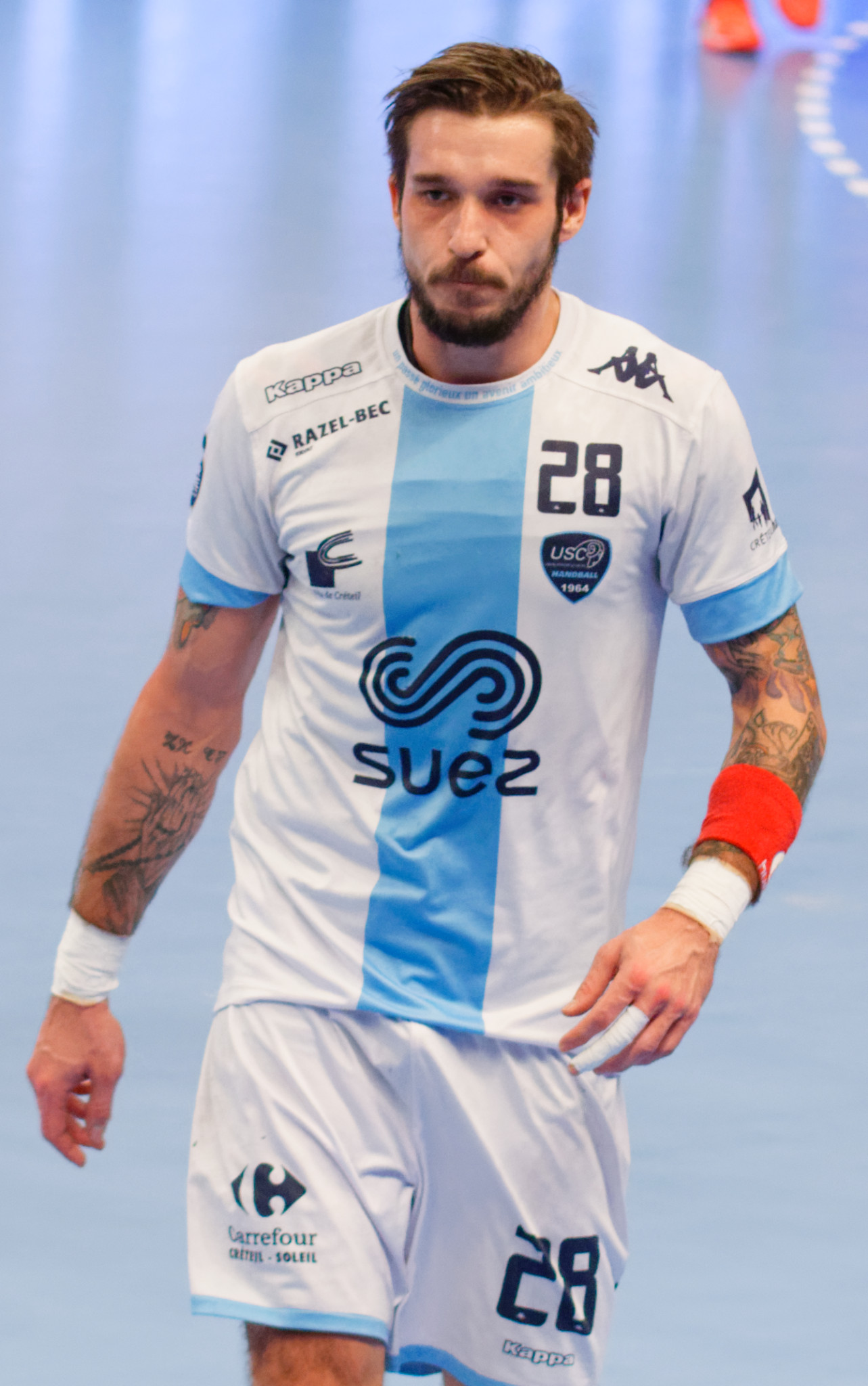
- Alexandru Csepreghi in 2016

Personal information
- Full name: Alexandru Iuliu Csepreghi
- Nationality: Romanian
- Born: 28 March 1987 (age 39) Baia Mare, Romania
- Height: 1.95 m (6 ft 5 in)

Sport
- Sport: Handball
- Position: Left Back / Middle Back

Youth career
- Years: Team
- 1998–2004: CS Marta Baia Mare

Senior clubs
- Years: Team
- 2004–2007: Minaur Baia Mare
- 2007–2014: HCM Constanța
- 2014–2018: US Créteil Handball
- 2018–2022: Minaur Baia Mare
- 2022-2023: CSM București
- 2023-2024: CSM Sighișoara
National team
- Years: Team
- 2006–2022: Romania

Alexandru Iuliu Csepreghi (born 28 March 1987) is a Romanian former handballer who is best known for his spells at HCM Constanța, US Cretail Handball and the Romania national team. Currently he is manager and coach of his own handball academy Academia de Handbal "Alexandru Csepreghi".

== Achievements ==
- Liga Națională:
  - Gold Medalist: 2009, 2010, 2011, 2012, 2013, 2014
  - Silver Medalist: 2008
  - Bronze Medalist: 2005
- Cupa României:
  - Winner: 2011, 2012, 2013, 2014
- Supercupa României:
  - Winner: 2008, 2011, 2013
- EHF Cup:
  - Fourth place: 2014
- EHF Cup Winners' Cup:
  - Quarterfinalist: 2007, 2009

== Individual awards ==
- Liga Națională Top Scorer: 2019
- Gala Premiilor Handbalului Românesc Liga Națională Most Valuable Player: 2019

== Personal life ==
His mother was also a handball player. Csepreghi is married since 2010.
