= Chike Onyejekwe =

Romanian handball player (born 1986)

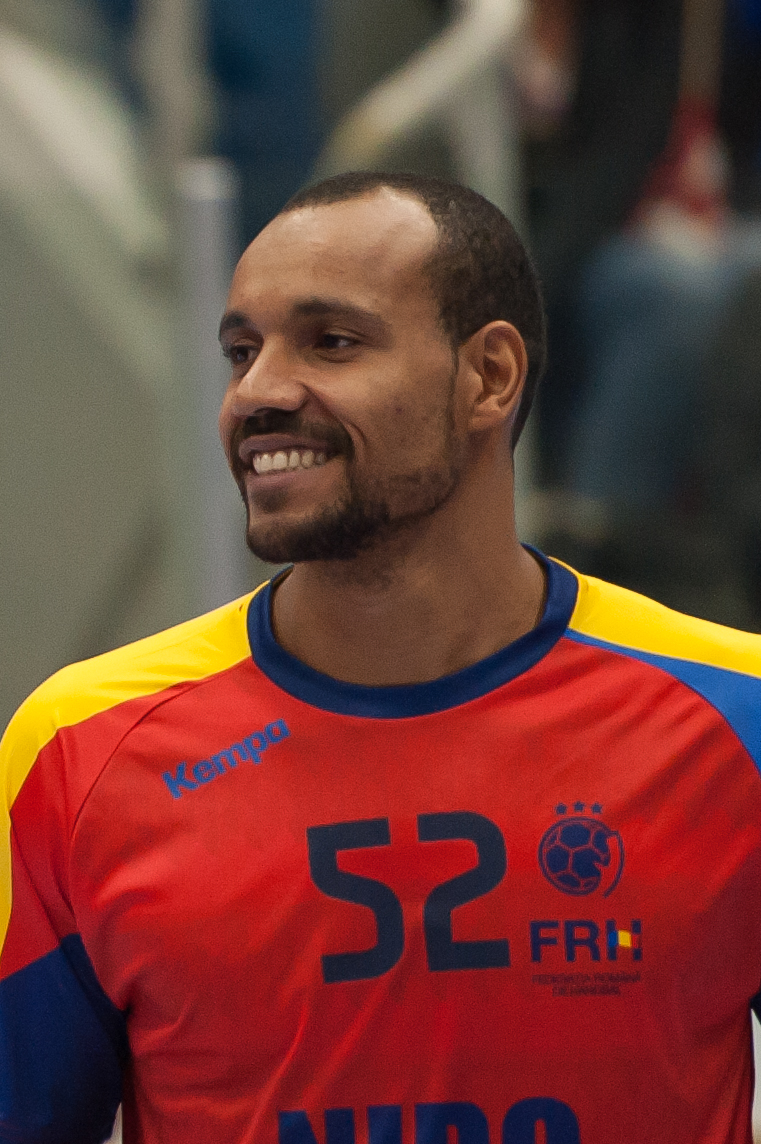
- Chike Onyejekwe in November 2015

Personal information
- Full name: Chike Osita Onyejekwe
- Nationality: Romanian
- Born: December 9, 1986 (age 39) Hațeg, Romania
- Height: 1.85 m (6 ft 1 in)

Sport
- Sport: Handball
- Position: Left wing
- Current club: CSM București

Senior clubs
- Years: Team
- 2007–2010: Știința Bacău
- 2010–2012: HCM Constanța
- 2012–2013: CSM Ploiești
- 2013-2017: HC Odorheiu Secuiesc
- 2017-: CSM București
National team
- Years: Team
- 2009-: Romania

Chike Osita Onyejekwe (born December 9, 1986, in Hațeg, Romania) is a Romanian handballer who plays as a left wing for Liga Națională club CSM Bucharest.

He was born in Hațeg to a Romanian mother and Nigerian father, both intellectuals. One of his sisters, Nneka, plays volleyball professionally.

== Achievements ==
- Liga Națională:
  - Gold: 2011, 2012
  - Bronze: 2013
- Cupa României:
  - Winner: 2011
