= Adrián Sipos =

Hungarian handball player (born 1990)

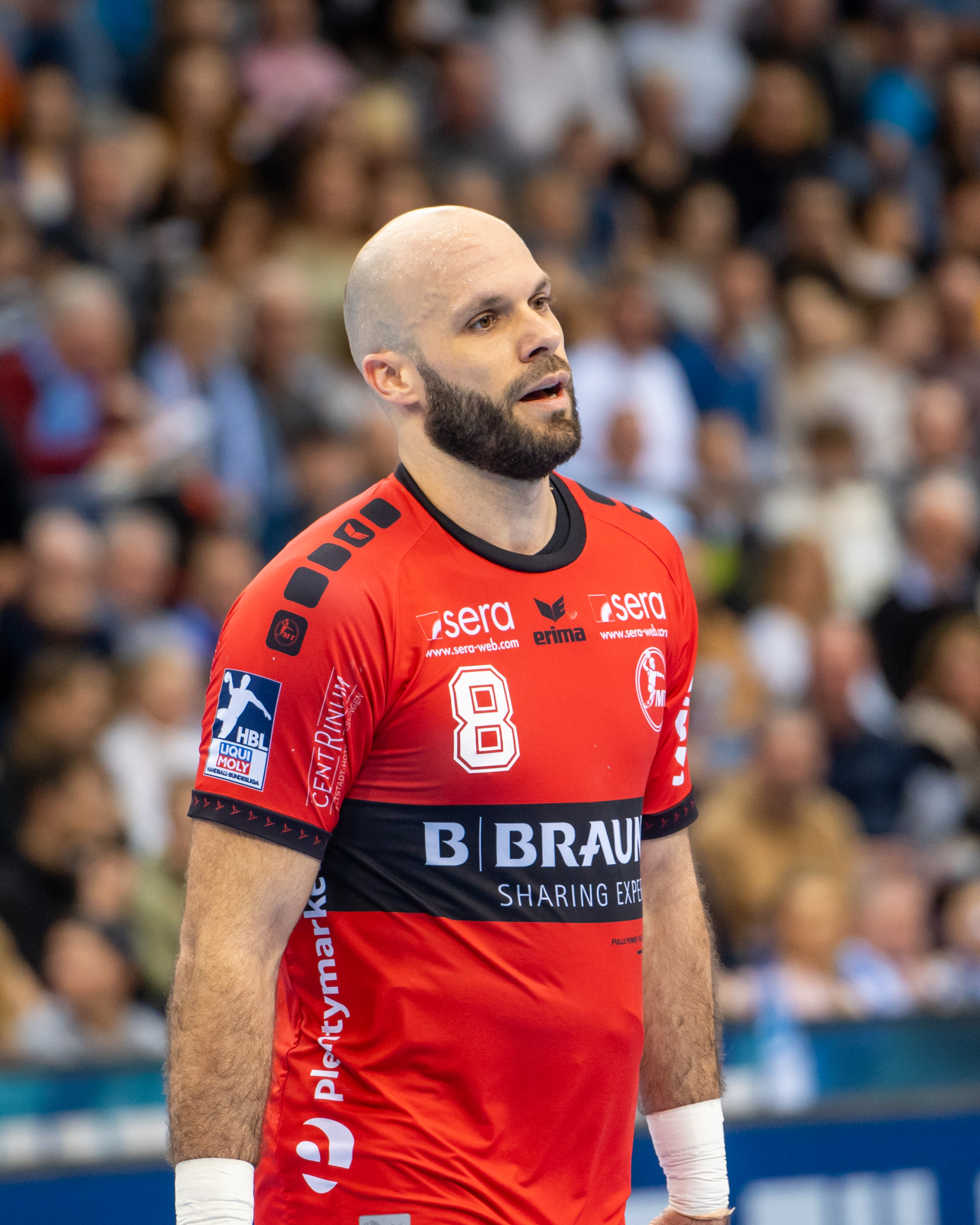

Personal information
- Nationality: Hungarian
- Born: 8 March 1990 (age 36) Szombathely, Hungary
- Height: 1.98 m (6 ft 6 in)

Sport
- Sport: Handball
- Position: Line Player
- Current club: MT Melsungen
- Number: 8

Youth career
- Years: Team
- 2005–2008: Szombathelyi Tanárképző SE
- 2008–2010: MKB Veszprém

Senior clubs
- Years: Team
- 2010–2013: CSM Bacău
- 2013–2016: HC Odorheiu Secuiesc
- 2016–2021: Tatabánya KC
- 2021–2023: Telekom Veszprém
- 2023–: MT Melsungen
National team
Years	Team	Apps	(Gls)
2018–	Hungary	112	(54)

Adrián Sipos (born 8 March 1990) is a Hungarian handball player for MT Melsungen and the Hungarian national team.

== Career ==
=== Club ===
Adrián Sipos started playing at the NB II Szombathelyi Tanárképző SE. He spent almost four years in the association in Szombathely, from where he joined the leading club of the country, MKB Veszprém, with a big leap in 2008, led by the former federal captain Sándor Kaló, a legend from Veszprém, who condemned him immediately after the trial. he spent two years there. As he was not interested in the twenty-year-old player at home in a leading club he would have liked to go to, he moved to Romania, where he played in the first division for three and a half years in the strong middle team CSM Bacău, then two and a half in Székelyudvarhelyi KC. The former won two championship silver medals and made his debut in the EHF Cup, and the latter won the third place in 2015 after beating British Cambridge HC, Luxembourg's Red Boys Differdange, Ukraine's ZTR Zaporizhia, Portugal's Benfica and ABC Braga in the final, European Cup series, the Challenge Cup. He returned to Hungary in 2016 and became a player of NB I Grundfos Tatabánya KC. In 2019, he was voted the best Hungarian defensive player by the Hungarian Handball Association. In April 2020, Grundfos Tatabánya KC announced that it had extended its contract until 2023. He did not fulfill his contract: in the summer of 2021 he signed a 2-year contract with the Telekom Veszprém team.

=== National team ===
He was noticed by the national team after he returned to Hungary in 2016. Xavi Sabaté, who led the Hungarian national ensemble in 2016 and 2017, invited him to the cohesion in December 2016, which did not turn out well because his ankles went out during the first training session. Ljubomir Vranjes first made it into the adult national team and made his debut against Austria in April 2018 in the team preparing for the World Cup qualifier against Slovenia. He represented Hungary at the 2019 World Men's Handball Championship, 2020 European Men's Handball Championship and 2021 World Championship (5th place, 6 matches / 3 goals).

== Honours ==
=== Club ===
CSM Bacău

- Liga Națională
  - Silver: 2012, 2013

Székelyudvarhelyi KC

- EHF Challenge Cup
  - Gold: 2015

Grundfos Tatabánya KC

- Nemzeti Bajnokság I
  - Bronze: 2017, 2018, 2019, 2021
- Magyar Kupa
  - Bronze: 2017

Telekom Veszprém

- Nemzeti Bajnokság I
  - Gold: 2023
- Magyar Kupa
  - Gold: 2022, 2023
- SEHA League
  - Gold: 2021, 2022

MT Melsungen

- EHF European League:
  - Gold: 2026
- DHB-Pokal
  - Silver: 2024, 2025

=== Individual ===
- Hungarian Best Defensive Player Of The Year: 2019
