= Alexandru Șimicu =

Romanian handball player (born 1988)

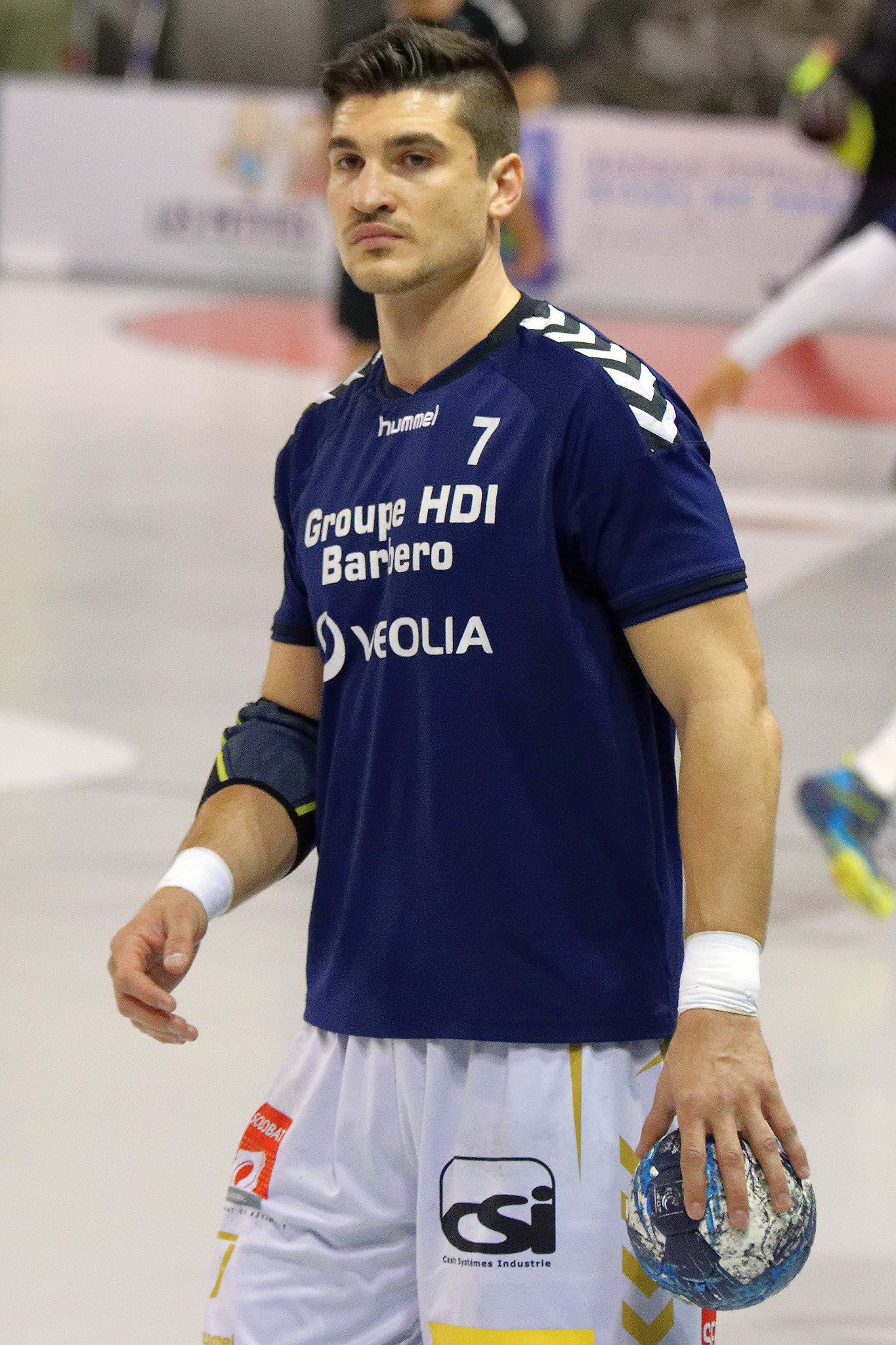
- March 23, 2016

Personal information
- Full name: Alexandru-Viorel Șimicu
- Nationality: Romanian
- Born: 8 October 1988 (age 38) Timișoara, Romania
- Height: 2.02 m (6 ft 8 in)

Sport
- Sport: Handball
- Position: Left Back
- Current club: Saint-Raphaël Var Handball
- Number: 7

Senior clubs
- Years: Team
- –2011: Politehnica Timişoara
- 2011–2014: HCM Constanța
- 2014–2015: HSV Hamburg
- 2015-: Saint-Raphaël Var Handball
National team
Years	Team	Apps	(Gls)
2006–	Romania	34	(52)
- Updated on 12 August 2014

Alexandru-Viorel Șimicu (born 8 October 1988 in Timișoara) is a Romanian handballer playing for Saint-Raphaël Var Handball as a left back. Șimicu ranked second in the 2013–14 EHF Cup's top goalscorers list.

== Achievements ==
- Liga Națională:
  - Winner: 2012, 2013, 2014
- Cupa României:
  - Winner: 2012, 2013, 2014
- Supercupa României:
  - Winner: 2013
- EHF Cup:
  - Finalist: 2015
  - Fourth place: 2014
- France Division 1:
  - Runner-up: 2016

== Individual awards ==
- Romanian Handballer of the Year: 2013
