= List of EHF club competition winners =

The European Handball Federation EHF is the governing body for Handball in Europe. It organises Three main Active club competitions : the EHF Champions League (formerly European Cup), the EHF Cup, and the EHF Challenge Cup. there is also another Two former EHF club competitions such as the EHF Cup Winners' Cup Existed between the years 1976 to 2013 and there is the EHF Men's Champions Trophy begin in 1979 and end it in 2008. Spanish side FC Barcelona have won a record total of 23 titles in EHF Europe club competitions, Ten more than VfL Gummersbach.

The German clubs have won the most titles (63), ahead of clubs from Spain (49).

== Winners ==
=== By club ===
The following table lists all the men's clubs that have won at least one EHF Europe club competition, and is updated as of 05 May 2025 (in chronological order).

Key

ECL	Champions League
EHC	EHF Cup
EHCC	EHF Challenge
ECW	EHF Cup Winners(defunct)
ECT	EHF Champions Trophy (defunct)

Most in category

List of EHF Europe club competition winners
Rk.	Club	ECL	EHC	EHCC	ECW	ECT	Total
1	(Spain) FC Barcelona	12	1		5	5	23
2	(Germany) VfL Gummersbach	5	2		4	2	13
3	(Germany) SC Magdeburg	3	4			3	10
4	(Germany) THW Kiel	4	4			1	9
5	(Spain) Ciudad Real	3			2	3	8
6	(Germany) Frisch Auf Göppingen	2	4				6
=	(Belarus) SKA Minsk	3		1	2		6
=	(Germany) Flensburg-Handewitt	1	2	1	2		6
9	(Germany) TV Großwallstadt	2	1	1		1	5
10	(Spain) CB Cantabria	1	1		2		4
=	(Spain) San Antonio	1			2	1	4
12	(Germany) TUSEM Essen	1		1	1		3
=	(Romania) Steaua Bucureşti	2		1			3
=	(Czechoslovakia) Dukla Prague	3					3
=	(Germany) TuS Nettelstedt			2	1		3
=	(Germany) TBV Lemgo		2		1		3
=	(Spain) BM Granollers		2		1		3
=	(Romania) CS UCM Reşiţa			3			3
19	(Soviet Union) CSKA Moscow	1			1		2
=	(France) Montpellier	2					2
=	(North Macedonia) RK Vardar	2					2
=	(Socialist Federal Republic of Yugoslavia) Metaloplastika	2					2
=	(Croatia) Zagreb	2					2
=	(Socialist Federal Republic of Yugoslavia) Borac Banja Luka	1	1				2
=	(Spain) Bidasoa Irún	1			1		2
=	(Slovenia) Rokometni klub Celje	1				1	2
=	(Germany) Hamburg	1			1		2
=	(Romania) HC Minaur Baia Mare		2				2
=	(Germany) Füchse Berlin		2				2
=	(Denmark) Skjern Håndbold			2			2
=	(Portugal) Sporting CP			2			2
=	(Hungary) Veszprém KC				2		2
=	(Spain) Ademar León				2		2
=	(East Germany) Empor Rostock				1	1	2
=	(Soviet Union) MAI Moscow	1			1		2
36	(Socialist Federal Republic of Yugoslavia) Bjelovar	1					1
=	(Romania) Dinamo Bucureşti	1					1
=	(Hungary) Budapesti Honvéd	1					1
=	(Sweden) Redbergslids IK	1					1
=	(East Germany) DHfK Leipzig	1					1
=	(East Germany) ASK Frankfurt/Oder	1					1
=	(Poland) PGE Vive Kielce	1					1
=	(Hungary) Pick Szeged		1				1
=	(Germany) Rhein-Neckar Löwen		1				1
=	(Germany) HSG Nordhorn		1				1
=	(Croatia) Metković Jambo		1				1
=	(Spain) Alzira Avidesa		1				1
=	(Germany) Wallau-Massenheim		1				1
=	(Soviet Union) SKIF Krasnodar		1				1
=	(Germany) tuRU Düsseldorf		1				1
=	(Soviet Union) Granitas Kaunas		1				1
=	(Hungary) Győri ETO FC		1				1
=	(Soviet Union) ZTR Zaporizhia		1				1
=	(Portugal) S.L. Benfica		1				1
=	(Portugal) ABC/UMinho			1			1
=	(Sweden) IFK Skövde			1			1
=	(Norway) Drammen HK			1			1
=	(Switzerland) Wacker Thun			1			1
=	(Romania) Potaissa Turda			1			1
=	(Germany) TV Niederwürzbach			1			1
=	(Serbia and Montenegro) Jugović Kać			1			1
=	(Slovenia) Cimos Koper			1			1
=	(Greece) Diomidis Argous			1			1
=	(Greece) AEK Athens HC			1			1
=	(Sweden) IK Sävehof			1			1
=	(Romania) Odorheiu Secuiesc			1			1
=	(Romania) CSM București			1			1
=	(Norway) Nærbø IL			1			1
=	(Iceland) Valur Club			1			1
=	(Spain) BM Valladolid				1		1
=	(France) OM Vitrolles				1		1
=	(Germany) TSV Milbertshofen				1		1
=	(Spain) Calpisa				1		1
=	(Russia) Chekhovskiye				1		1

=== By country ===
The following table lists all the countries whose clubs have won at least one EHF competition, and is updated as of 05 May 2025 (in chronological order).

Key

ECL	Champions League
EHC	EHF Cup
EHCC	EHF Challenge
ECW	EHF Cup Winners (defunct)
ECT	EHF Champions Trophy (defunct)

Most in category

List of EHF Europe club competition winners by country
Rk.	Nation	ECL	EHC	EHCC	ECW	ECT	Total
1.	Germany	16	24	6	11	6	63
2.	Spain	18	5		17	9	49
3.	Soviet Union	5	3		4		12
=	Romania	3	2	7			12
5.	East Germany	4			1	2	7
6.	Yugoslavia	4	1				5
=	Hungary	1	2		2		5
8.	Portugal		1	3			4
9.	Czechoslovakia	3					3
=	Croatia	2	1				3
=	France	2			1		3
=	Slovenia	1		1		1	3
=	Sweden	1		2			3
14.	North Macedonia	2					2
=	Denmark			2			2
=	Greece			2			2
=	Norway			2			2
18.	Russia				1		1
=	Poland	1					1
=	Belarus			1			1
=	Serbia and Montenegro			1			1
=	Switzerland			1			1
=	Iceland			1			1

== See also ==
- European Handball Federation
