= Gabriel Bujor =

Romanian handball player (born 1990)

Personal information
- Full name: Gabriel Bujor
- Nationality: Romanian
- Born: 8 November 1990 (age 35) Tecuci, Romania
- Height: 1.88 m (6 ft 2 in)

Sport
- Sport: Handball
- Position: Right Wing
- Current club: CSM Constanța

Senior clubs
- Years: Team
- 2008–2014: CS Știința Bacău
- 2014–2018: HC Vaslui
- 2018–2020 / 2020-2021: AHC Dunărea Călărași
- 2021–2022: CSM Bacău
National team
- Years: Team
- –: Romania

Gabriel Bujor (born 8 November 1990) is a Romanian handball player who plays for CSM Constanța and the Romania national team.

== Achievements ==
- Liga Națională:
  - Silver Medalist: 2012, 2013, 2014

== Individual awards ==
- Liga Națională

Top Scorer:2017, 2018

== Personal life ==
He has a twin brother named Mihai Bujor who is also a handball player.
