= Milutin Dragićević =

Serbian handball player (born 1983)

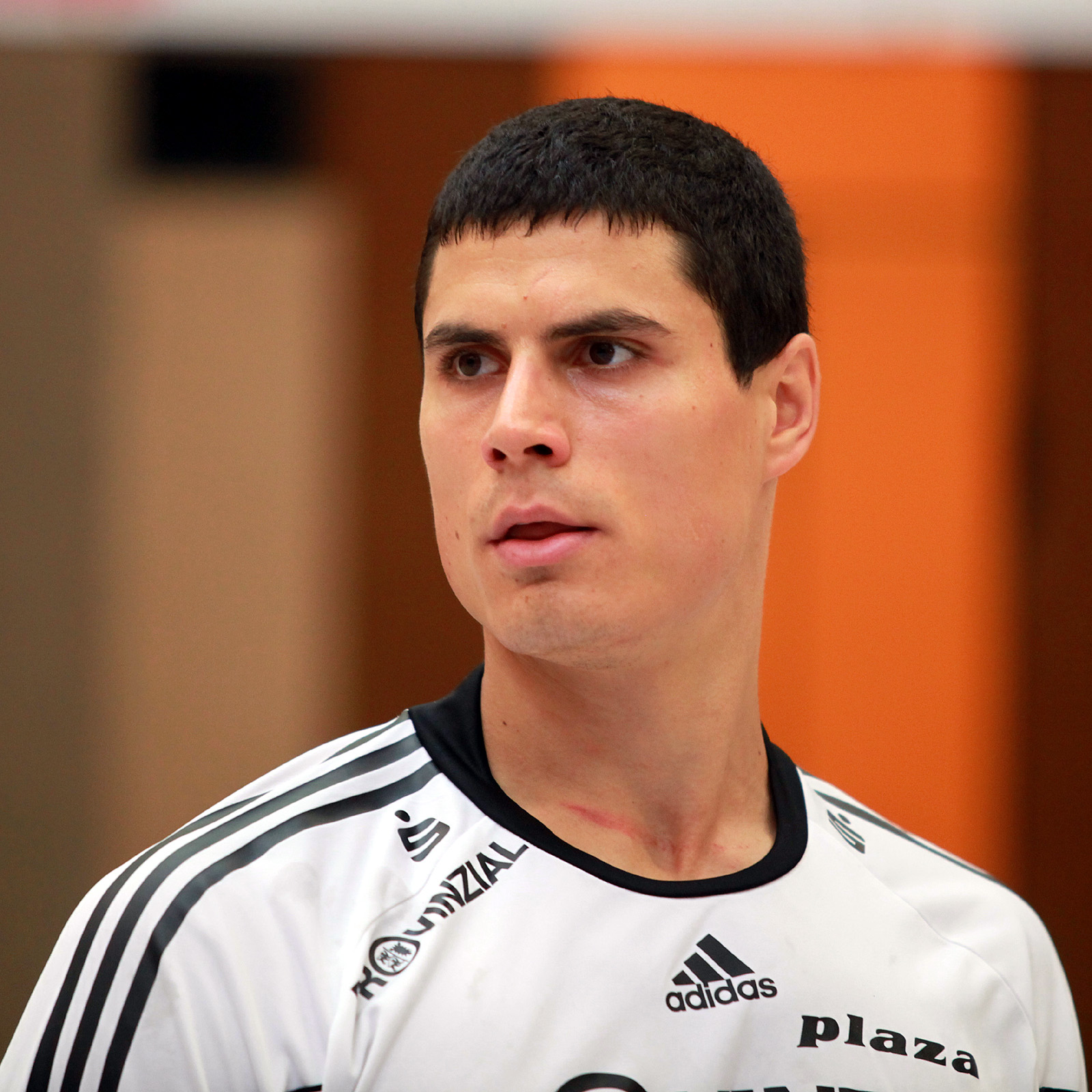
- Dragićević in 2010

Personal information
- Full name: Milutin Dragićević
- Nationality: Serbian
- Born: 21 April 1983 (age 43) Šabac, SFR Yugoslavia
- Height: 1.87 m (6 ft 2 in)

Sport
- Sport: Handball
- Position: Pivot
- Current club: Mačva Bogatić
- Number: 23

Youth career
- Years: Team
- –: Metaloplastika

Senior clubs
- Years: Team
- –: Metaloplastika
- 2005–2007: HCM Constanța
- 2007–2010: Bjerringbro-Silkeborg
- 2010–2012: THW Kiel
- 2012–2013: HCM Constanța
- 2014: Nordsjælland
- 2014–2017: Metaloplastika
- 2017: Metaloplastika
- 2018–: Mačva Bogatić
National team
- Years: Team
- –: Serbia

Teams managed
- 2017–2018: Metaloplastika (assistant)

Milutin Dragićević (Serbian Cyrillic: Милутин Драгићевић; born 21 April 1983) is a Serbian handball player for Mačva Bogatić.

== Career ==
Born in Šabac, Dragićević started out at his hometown club Metaloplastika. He later moved abroad and played for HCM Constanța (on two occasions), Bjerringbro-Silkeborg and THW Kiel. While playing for the German side, Dragićević was a member of the team that won the 2011–12 EHF Champions League. He returned to his mother club Metaloplastika ahead of the 2014–15 season, signing a three-year contract.

At international level, Dragićević was capped for Serbia, but failed to appear in any major tournaments.

== Honours ==
HCM Constanța

- Liga Națională: 2005–06, 2006–07, 2012–13
- Cupa României: 2005–06, 2012–13

THW Kiel

- Handball-Bundesliga: 2011–12
- DHB-Pokal: 2010–11, 2011–12
- DHB-Supercup: 2011
- EHF Champions League: 2011–12
- IHF Super Globe: 2011
