= Mihai Popescu (handballer) =

Romanian handball player (born 1985)

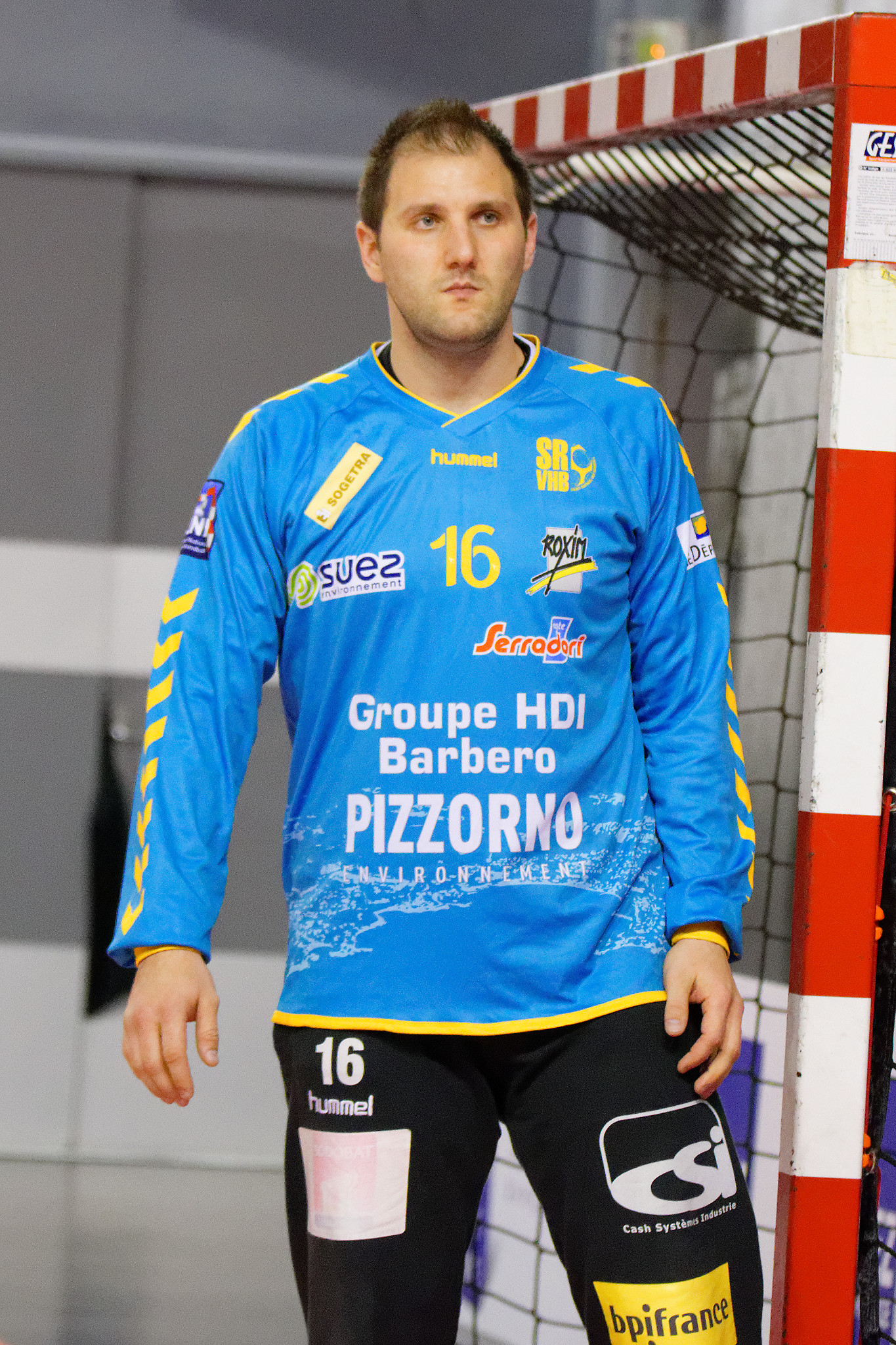

Personal information
- Full name: Mihai Cătălin Popescu
- Nationality: Romanian
- Born: 15 March 1985 (age 41) Găești, Romania
- Height: 1.95 m (6 ft 5 in)

Sport
- Sport: Handball
- Position: Goalkeeper
- Current club: Potaissa Turda
- Number: 16

Senior clubs
- Years: Team
- 2003-2015: HCM Constanța
- 2015-2024: Saint-Raphaël VHB
- 2024-: Potaissa Turda
National team
Years	Team	Apps
2001-2021	Romania	250 games
- Updated on 20 June 2021

Mihai Popescu (born 15 March 1985 in Găești) is a Romanian handballer who plays for Romanian team Potaissa Turda and the Romanian national team.

He was given the award of Cetățean de onoare ("Honorary Citizen") of his hometown Găești in 2009.

== Achievements ==
- LNH Division 1:
  - Runner-up: 2016
- Liga Națională:
  - Winner: 2004, 2006, 2007, 2009, 2010, 2011, 2012, 2013, 2014
- Cupa României:
  - Winner: 2006, 2011, 2012, 2013, 2014
- Supercupa României:
  - Winners: 2008, 2011, 2013, 2014
- EHF Cup Winners' Cup:
  - Semifinalist: 2006
- EHF Cup:
  - Finalist: 2018
  - Semifinalist: 2017
  - Semifinalist: 2014
- EHF Challenge Cup:
  - Semifinalist: 2004

== Individual awards ==
- Romanian Handballer of the Year: 2010, 2011, 2012, 2014, 2016, 2017, 2018, 2019,,2021,2022
- LNH Division 1 Best Foreign Goalkeeper: 2015–16
- Best Goalkeeper of the EHF Cup's Final 4: 2018
