= 2013–14 EHF Cup knockout stage =

This page describes the knockout stage of the 2013–14 EHF Cup.

== Quarterfinals ==
The draw was held on 1 April 2014 at 12:15 in Vienna, Austria. The first legs are played on 19–21 April, and the second legs on 26–27 April 2014.

=== Ranking of the second-placed teams ===
The ranking of the second-placed teams is carried out on the basis of the team's results in the group stage. Because the German side Füchse Berlin, the organizers of the Final 4 tournament, finished on top of their group they qualified directly to the final tournament and only the top three second-placed teams qualified to the quarter-finals.

Group	Team	Pld	W	D	L	GF	GA	GD	Pts
B	(Portugal) Sporting CP	6	4	0	2	195	165	+30	8
C	(France) Nantes	6	4	0	2	176	154	+22	8
D	(Romania) Constanța	6	3	2	1	173	160	+13	8
A	(Spain) Ademar León	6	2	2	2	173	164	+9	6

=== Seedings ===
Pot 1	Pot 2
(Sweden) LUGI HF	(Portugal) Sporting CP
(France) Montpellier	(France) Nantes
(Hungary) Pick Szeged	(Romania) Constanța

=== Matches ===
Team 1	Agg.	Team 2	1st leg	2nd leg
Constanța (Romania)	1	(Sweden) LUGI HF	31–21	26/27 April
Sporting CP (Portugal)	2	(Hungary) Pick Szeged	29–27	27 April
Nantes (France)	3	(France) Montpellier	21 April	27 April

==== First leg ====
19 April 2014; 12:00	Constanța (Romania)	31–21	(Sweden) LUGI HF	Sala Sporturilor, Constanța; Attendance: 1,800; Referees: Jurinovic, Mrvica (CRO)
19 April 2014; 12:00		(15–10)		Sala Sporturilor, Constanța; Attendance: 1,800; Referees: Jurinovic, Mrvica (CRO)
19 April 2014; 12:00		Report		Sala Sporturilor, Constanța; Attendance: 1,800; Referees: Jurinovic, Mrvica (CRO)

20 April 2014; 17:00	Sporting CP (Portugal)	29–27	(Hungary) Pick Szeged	Pavilhão Desportivo Municipal, Mafra; Attendance: 1,000; Referees: Pichon, Reveret (FRA)
20 April 2014; 17:00		(11–12)		Pavilhão Desportivo Municipal, Mafra; Attendance: 1,000; Referees: Pichon, Reveret (FRA)
20 April 2014; 17:00		Report		Pavilhão Desportivo Municipal, Mafra; Attendance: 1,000; Referees: Pichon, Reveret (FRA)

21 April 2014; 19:30	Nantes (France)	25–26	(France) Montpellier	Palais des Sports de Beaulieu, Nantes; Attendance: 5,000; Referees: Eliasson, Pálsson (ISL)
21 April 2014; 19:30		(13–15)		Palais des Sports de Beaulieu, Nantes; Attendance: 5,000; Referees: Eliasson, Pálsson (ISL)
21 April 2014; 19:30		Report		Palais des Sports de Beaulieu, Nantes; Attendance: 5,000; Referees: Eliasson, Pálsson (ISL)

==== Second leg ====
26 April 2014; 18:30	LUGI HF (Sweden)	34–28	(Romania) Constanța	FFS Arena, Lund; Attendance: 900; Referees: Zotin, Volodkov (RUS)
26 April 2014; 18:30		(14–13)		FFS Arena, Lund; Attendance: 900; Referees: Zotin, Volodkov (RUS)
26 April 2014; 18:30		Report		FFS Arena, Lund; Attendance: 900; Referees: Zotin, Volodkov (RUS)

27 April 2014; 19:00	Montpellier (France)	33–24	(France) Nantes	Park&Suites Arena, Montpellier; Attendance: 3,000; Referees: Geipel, Helbig (GER)
27 April 2014; 19:00		(17–9)		Park&Suites Arena, Montpellier; Attendance: 3,000; Referees: Geipel, Helbig (GER)
27 April 2014; 19:00		Report		Park&Suites Arena, Montpellier; Attendance: 3,000; Referees: Geipel, Helbig (GER)

27 April 2014; 19:15	Pick Szeged (Hungary)	28–22	(Portugal) Sporting CP	Városi Sportcsarnok, Szeged; Attendance: 3,200; Referees: Pandzic, Mosorinski (SRB)
27 April 2014; 19:15		(16–10)		Városi Sportcsarnok, Szeged; Attendance: 3,200; Referees: Pandzic, Mosorinski (SRB)
27 April 2014; 19:15		Report		Városi Sportcsarnok, Szeged; Attendance: 3,200; Referees: Pandzic, Mosorinski (SRB)

== Final Tournament ==
=== Semifinals ===
17 May 2014; 17:15	Constanța (Romania)	32–36	(France) Montpellier	Max-Schmeling-Halle, Berlin; Attendance: 7250; Referees: Stolarovs, Licis (LAT)
17 May 2014; 17:15		(14–18)		Max-Schmeling-Halle, Berlin; Attendance: 7250; Referees: Stolarovs, Licis (LAT)
17 May 2014; 17:15		Report		Max-Schmeling-Halle, Berlin; Attendance: 7250; Referees: Stolarovs, Licis (LAT)

17 May 2014; 17:15	Füchse Berlin (Germany)	22–24	(Hungary) Pick Szeged	Max-Schmeling-Halle, Berlin; Attendance: 8500; Referees: Togstad, Kristiansen (NOR)
17 May 2014; 17:15		(9–13)		Max-Schmeling-Halle, Berlin; Attendance: 8500; Referees: Togstad, Kristiansen (NOR)
17 May 2014; 17:15		Report		Max-Schmeling-Halle, Berlin; Attendance: 8500; Referees: Togstad, Kristiansen (NOR)
