= 2009–10 Liga Națională (men's handball) =

Seasons
- 2008–09 2010–11

The 2009–10 Liga Națională was the 52nd season of Romanian Handball League, the top-level men's professional handball league. The league comprises 13 teams. CSM Medgidia withdrew from the championship and all of its results were cancelled. HCM Constanța were the defending champions, for the second time in a row.

== Standings ==
Pos	Team	Pld	W	D	L	GF	GA	GD	Pts	Qualification or relegation
1	HCM Constanța (C)	24	21	2	1	788	626	+162	44	2010–11 EHF Champions League
2	UCM Reșița	24	18	2	4	739	624	+115	38	2010–11 EHF Cup Winners' Cup
3	Pandurii Târgu Jiu	24	17	1	6	676	639	+37	35	2010–11 EHF Cup
4	Ştiinţa Bacău	24	15	4	5	746	689	+57	34	2010–11 EHF Challenge Cup
5	Steaua București	24	15	2	7	717	639	+78	32	2010–11 EHF Challenge Cup
6	Universitatea Suceava	24	15	0	9	715	650	+65	30	
7	HC Odorheiu Secuiesc	24	11	0	13	710	731	−21	22	
8	Universitatea Cluj-Napoca	24	9	1	14	634	663	−29	19	
9	Minaur Baia Mare	24	8	2	14	633	640	−7	18	
10	Politehnica Timişoara	24	6	2	16	608	718	−110	14	
11	CSM Satu Mare	24	6	1	17	702	777	−75	13	
12	Dinamo București	24	4	2	18	703	810	−107	10	
13	Rom Cri Braşov (R)	24	1	1	22	607	772	−165	3	Relegation to Divizia A
14	CSM Medgidia (R)	0	0	0	0	0	0	0	0 (Note: CSM Medgidia withdrew from the championship.)	Relegation to Divizia A

(C) Champions; (R) Relegated
