= Aihan Omer =

Romanian team handball player and coach (born 1960)

Aihan Omer (Dobrujan Tatar: Ayhan Ómer; born June 27, 1960) is a Romanian team handball player and coach. Known for his performances with various clubs, he trained the national men's team between 1994 and 2003, and again from 2007.

== Biography ==
Born into an ethnic Tatar family (although he is commonly believed to be a Turk) in Constanța, he began playing handball at the age of twelve, when he trained with the Constanța School Club. He then played professionally for Dinamo Bucharest, winning the National Championship edition of 1984–1985, for Carpați Mârșa (1986–1988), and for Hidrotehnica Constanţa (1988–1990), promoting to the First League with the latter (1989). During the period, he also made 60 appearances on the national team.

Omer began his career as a coach in 1990, being originally employed by the School Club in Medgidia, and later by Cimentul Medgidia (which he promoted to the Second Division in 1993). In addition to becoming national team coach in 1994, he was employed by Dacia Piteşti (1995–1998).

In 1999, Omer moved to Minaur Baia Mare, where he registered his first major success, winning both the Championship and National Cup later in the same year. He moved on to Fibrex Piatra Neamţ, repeating the performance in 2001–2002 and 2002–2003, before joining HCM Constanța. With the latter, Omer won the Championship in 2004 and 2006, as well as the Cup in 2005 and 2006; additionally, he reached the semi-finals of the EHF Challenge Cup and the European Cup (in 2004 and 2006 respectively).

He moved on to become coach of UCM Reşiţa, being generally credited with the team's subsequent successes. He coached the team to victory in the 2007 Challenge Cup, when they beat Drammen HK on their home ground in Norway. In autumn 2007, he was appointed coach of the national handball team, with the aim of qualifying for the 2009 World Men's Handball Championship to be held in Croatia.

Ayhan Omer is married to Nurgian, and has two children; his son Erkan is also a handball player.
