= CSM Ploiești =

CSM Ploiești may refer to:

- FC Astra Giurgiu, Romanian football club, formerly known as CSM Ploiești
- CSM Ploiești (women's handball), Romanian handball team
- CSM Ploiești (men's handball), Romanian handball team
