= 2013–14 Liga Națională (men's handball) =

Seasons
- 2012–13 2014–15

The 2013–14 Liga Națională was the 56th season of Romanian Handball League, the top-level men's professional handball league. The league comprises twelve teams. HCM Constanța were the defending champions, for the sixth time in a row.

== Teams ==
Location of teams in the Romanian Men's Handball League

| Club | Ground(s) | Capacity |
|---|---|---|
| HCM Constanța | Sala Sporturilor Constanța | 2,100 |
| Știinţa Bacău | Sala Sporturilor Bacău | 2,000 |
| HC Odorheiu Secuiesc | Sala Sporturilor Odorheiu Secuiesc | 1,250 |
| CSU Bucovina Suceava | Sala LPS Suceava | 424 |
| ACS Potaissa Turda | Sala de sport "Gheorghe Baritiu" Turda | 600 |
| CS Caraș-Severin | Sala Polivalentă Reșița | 1,621 |
| CSU Poli Timișoara | Sala Constantin Jude Timișoara | 1,540 |
| CSM București | Sala Sporturilor Rapid București | 1,500 |
| Pandurii Târgu Jiu | Sala Sporturilor Târgu Jiu | 1,500 |
| Dinamo București | Sala Sporturilor CS Dinamo București | 2,538 |
| Steaua București | Sala Sporturilor "Concordia" Chiajna | 4,000 |
| Minaur Baia Mare | Sala Sporturilor "Lascăr Pană" Baia Mare | 2,036 |

== Personnel ==
| Team | Manager |
|---|---|
| HCM Constanța | (North Macedonia) Zvonko Šundovski |
| Știinţa Bacău | (Romania) Eliodor Voica |
| HC Odorheiu Secuiesc | (Romania) Vlad Caba |
| CSU Bucovina Suceava | (Romania) Răzvan Bernicu |
| ACS Potaissa Turda | (Romania) Horațiu Gal |
| CS Caraș-Severin | (Romania) Aihan Omer |
| CSU Poli Timișoara | (Romania) Constantin Ștefan |
| CSM București | (Romania) Robert Licu (Round 1–7) (Romania) Lucian Ghiulai (Round 8–14) (Serbia) Bozo Rudic (Round 15–22) |
| Pandurii Târgu Jiu | (Romania) Liviu Andrieş |
| Dinamo București | (Romania) Sebastian Bota |
| Steaua București | (Romania) Ovidiu Mihăilă (Round 1–13) (Romania) Viorel Mazilu (Round 14–22) |
| Minaur Baia Mare | (Romania) Gheorghe Covaciu |

== League table ==
| Pos | Team | Pld | W | D | L | GF | GA | GD | Pts | Qualification |
|---|---|---|---|---|---|---|---|---|---|---|
| 1 | HCM Constanța | 22 | 20 | 2 | 0 | 714 | 526 | +188 | 62 | Qualification to Play-Off |
| 2 | ASC Potaissa Turda | 22 | 17 | 2 | 3 | 597 | 531 | +66 | 53 | Qualification to Play-Off |
| 3 | CS Ştiinţa Municipal Dedeman Bacău | 22 | 16 | 1 | 5 | 610 | 542 | +68 | 49 | Qualification to Play-Off |
| 4 | Energia Lignitul Pandurii Târgu Jiu | 22 | 15 | 0 | 7 | 587 | 577 | +10 | 45 | Qualification to Play-Off |
| 5 | CS Dinamo București | 22 | 13 | 2 | 7 | 581 | 595 | −14 | 41 | Qualification to Play-Off |
| 6 | HC Odorheiu Secuiesc | 22 | 11 | 1 | 10 | 654 | 623 | +31 | 34 | Qualification to Play-Off |
| 7 | HC Minaur Baia Mare | 22 | 9 | 1 | 12 | 534 | 573 | −39 | 27 (Note: HC Minaur Baia Mare was docked 1 point.) | Qualification to Play-Out |
| 8 | CSA Steaua București | 22 | 8 | 0 | 14 | 624 | 661 | −37 | 24 | Qualification to Play-Out |
| 9 | CS Caraș - Severin Reșița | 22 | 6 | 1 | 15 | 549 | 581 | −32 | 19 | Qualification to Play-Out |
| 10 | CS Universitatea Politehnica Timişoara | 22 | 5 | 0 | 17 | 566 | 620 | −54 | 15 | Qualification to Play-Out |
| 11 | CSM București | 22 | 3 | 1 | 18 | 530 | 616 | −86 | 10 | Qualification to Play-Out |
| 12 | CS Universitatea Bucovina Suceava | 22 | 3 | 1 | 18 | 488 | 589 | −101 | 9 (Note: CS Universitatea Bucovina Suceava was docked 1 point.) | Qualification to Play-Out |

== Play-Off ==
| Team 1 | Team 2 | Round 1 | Round 2 | Round 3 |
|---|---|---|---|---|
| HCM Constanța | HC Odorheiu Secuiesc | 31–28 | 27–22 | |
| ASC Potaissa Turda | CS Dinamo București | 29–31 | 28–22 | 30–24 |
| CS Ştiinţa Bacău | Energia Lignitul Pandurii Târgu Jiu | 40–34 | 36–25 | |

=== League table – positions 1–3 ===
| Pos | Team | Pld | W | D | L | GF | GA | GD | Pts | Qualification |
|---|---|---|---|---|---|---|---|---|---|---|
| 1 | HCM Constanța (C) | 4 | 3 | 0 | 1 | 114 | 101 | +13 | 9 | 2014–15 EHF Champions League |
| 2 | CS Ştiinţa Municipal Dedeman Bacău | 4 | 3 | 0 | 1 | 103 | 102 | +1 | 9 | 2014–15 EHF Cup |
| 3 | ASC Potaissa Turda | 4 | 0 | 0 | 4 | 115 | 129 | −14 | 0 | 2014–15 EHF Cup |

(C) Champions

=== League table – positions 4–6 ===
| Pos | Team | Pld | W | D | L | GF | GA | GD | Pts | Qualification |
|---|---|---|---|---|---|---|---|---|---|---|
| 4 | HC Odorheiu Secuiesc | 4 | 3 | 0 | 1 | 118 | 104 | +14 | 9 | 2014–15 EHF Challenge Cup |
| 5 | Energia Lignitul Pandurii Târgu Jiu | 4 | 2 | 0 | 2 | 116 | 112 | +4 | 6 | |
| 6 | CS Dinamo București | 4 | 1 | 0 | 3 | 114 | 132 | −18 | 3 | |

== Play-Out ==
| Team 1 | Team 2 | Round 1 | Round 2 | Round 3 |
|---|---|---|---|---|
| HC Minaur Baia Mare | CS Universitatea Bucovina Suceava | 23–21 | 34–26 | |
| CSA Steaua București | CSM București | 27–26 | 22–25 | 35–28 |
| CS Caraș - Severin Reșița | CS Politehnica Timişoara | 19–27 | 25–25 | |

=== League table – positions 7–9 ===
| Pos | Team | Pld | W | D | L | GF | GA | GD | Pts |
|---|---|---|---|---|---|---|---|---|---|
| 7 | CS Universitatea Politehnica Timişoara | 4 | 4 | 0 | 0 | 119 | 104 | +15 | 12 |
| 8 | CSA Steaua București | 4 | 2 | 0 | 2 | 119 | 121 | −2 | 6 |
| 9 | HC Minaur Baia Mare | 4 | 0 | 0 | 4 | 119 | 132 | −13 | 0 |

=== League table – positions 10–12 ===
| Pos | Team | Pld | W | D | L | GF | GA | GD | Pts | Qualification |
|---|---|---|---|---|---|---|---|---|---|---|
| 10 | CSM București | 4 | 3 | 0 | 1 | 115 | 96 | +19 | 9 | |
| 11 | CS Caraș - Severin Reșița (R) | 4 | 2 | 0 | 2 | 110 | 98 | +12 | 6 | Team disbanded after season |
| 12 | CS Universitatea Bucovina Suceava | 4 | 1 | 0 | 3 | 70 | 101 | −31 | 3 | Spared from relegation |

(R) Relegated

== Top goalscorers ==
| Pos | Player | Team | Goals |
|---|---|---|---|
| 1 | (Romania) Claudiu Dediu | ASC Potaissa Turda | 155 |
| 2 | (Romania) Andrei Grasu | HC Minaur Baia Mare | 147 |
| 3 | (Romania) Florin Acatrinei | Energia Lignitul Pandurii Târgu Jiu | 141 |
