= 2010–11 Liga Națională (men's handball) =

Seasons
- 2009–10 2011–12

The 2010–11 Liga Națională was the 53rd season of Romanian Handball League, the top-level men's professional handball league in Romania. The league comprises 14 teams. HCM Constanța were the defending champions, for the third time in a row.

== Standings ==
Pos	Team	Pld	W	D	L	GF	GA	GD	Pts	Qualification or relegation
1	HCM Constanța (C)	26	23	1	2	892	728	+164	47	2011–12 EHF Champions League
2	HC Odorheiu Secuiesc	26	18	3	5	805	738	+67	39	2011–12 EHF Cup
3	Universitatea Suceava	26	18	1	7	807	714	+93	37	2011–12 EHF Challenge Cup
4	UCM Reșița	26	17	1	8	778	728	+50	35	2011–12 EHF Challenge Cup
5	Universitatea Cluj-Napoca	26	16	2	8	775	709	+66	34	
6	Ştiinţa Bacău	26	15	1	10	748	712	+36	31	
7	Pandurii Târgu Jiu	26	14	1	11	784	775	+9	29	2011–12 EHF Cup Winners' Cup
8	CSM Satu Mare	26	12	3	11	799	793	+6	27	
9	CSM București	26	9	2	15	753	808	−55	20	
10	Dinamo Brașov	26	7	3	16	690	753	−63	17	
11	Politehnica Timişoara	26	7	2	17	696	743	−47	16	
12	Steaua București	26	6	3	17	731	793	−62	15	
13	Minaur Baia Mare (R)	26	5	1	20	673	800	−127	11	Relegation to Divizia A
14	CSM Oradea (R)	26	2	2	22	731	868	−137	6	Relegation to Divizia A

(C) Champions; (R) Relegated
