= 2014–15 EHF Challenge Cup =

EHF Challenge Cup
- 2014–15

Tournament information
- Sport: Handball
- Dates: 21 November 2014–24 May 2015
- Teams: 30 (Qualification stage)

Final positions
- Champions: (Romania) Odorheiu Secuiesc
- Runner-up: (Portugal) ABC Braga

The 2014–15 EHF Challenge Cup was the 18th edition of the European Handball Federation's third-tier competition for men's handball clubs. It was held from 30 September 2014 to 24 May 2015.

== Overview ==
=== Team allocation ===
The labels in the parentheses show how each team qualified for the place of its starting round:

- TH: Title holders
- CW: Cup winners
- CR: Cup runners-up
- 2nd, 3rd, 4th, 5th, 6th, etc.: League position

Last 16
(Portugal) ABC Braga (3rd)
Round 3
(North Macedonia) Pelister (4th)	(Ukraine) ZTR Zaporizhia (3rd)	(Israel) Holon (CW)	(Kosovo) KH Prishtina (2nd)
(Poland) KS Azoty-Puławy (4th)	(Greece) ASE Doukas (3rd)	(Israel) Ramat Hasharon HC (4th)	(United Kingdom) Warrington Wolves HC (2nd)
(Romania) Odorheiu Secuiesc (4th)	(Greece) Poseidon Loutrakiou (4th)	(Belgium) HC Visé BM (CW)	(United Kingdom) Cambridge HC (3rd)
(Portugal) Benfica (4th)	(Greece) GAS Kilkis (6th)	(Italy) Carpi (CW)	(United Kingdom) Ruislip Eagles HC (4th)
(Norway) Stord (3rd)	(Turkey) Ankara İl Özel İdare (2nd)	(Czech Republic) Dukla Prague (CW)	(Georgia (country)) Samtredia (1st)
(Norway) FyllingenBergen (4th)	(Turkey) BB Ankaraspor (3rd)	(Estonia) Põlva Serviti (2nd)	(Finland) Riihimäki Cocks (1st)
(Serbia) Radnički Kragujevac (2nd)	(Luxembourg) HB Dudelange (3rd)	(Montenegro) Boka (3rd)	
(Serbia) Metaloplastika (3rd)	(Luxembourg) Red Boys Differdange (4th)	(Bulgaria) HC Dobrudja (1st)	

=== Round and draw dates ===
All draws held at the European Handball Federation headquarters in Vienna, Austria.

Round	Draw date	First leg	Second leg
Round 3	22 July 2014	12–23 November 2014	29–30 November 2014
Last 16	4 December 2014	14–15 February 2015	21–22 February 2015
Quarter-final	25 February 2015	14–15 March 2015	21–22 March 2015
Semi-finals	25 February 2015	11–12 April 2015	18–19 April 2015
Finals	25 February 2015	17 May 2015	24 May 2015

== Knockout stage ==
=== Round 3 ===
Teams listed first played the first leg at home. Some teams agreed to play both matches in the same venue. Bolded teams qualified into last 16.

Team 1	Agg.	Team 2	1st leg	2nd leg
BB Ankaraspor (Turkey)	47–60	(Ukraine) **ZTR Zaporizhia**	23–29	24–31
**Radnički Kragujevac** (Serbia)	62–54	(Greece) Poseidon Loutrakiou	34–21	28–33
**Red Boys Differdange** (Luxembourg)	81–45^{a}	(Turkey) Ankara İl Özel İdare	33–17	48–28
Warrington Wolves HC (United Kingdom)	37–51^{b}	(Israel) **Holon**	15–27	22–24
Boka (Montenegro)	54–75^{c}	(Luxembourg) **HB Dudelange**	28–38	26–37
Samtredia (Georgia (country))	51–79^{d}	(Finland) **Riihimäki Cocks**	25–41	26–38
Metaloplastika (Serbia)	44–58	(Poland) **KS Azoty-Puławy**	20–26	24–32
HC Dobrudja (Bulgaria)	50–62^{e}	(Israel) **Ramat Hasharon HC**	22–30	28–32
**Põlva Serviti** (Estonia)	57–53	(Italy) Carpi	36–24	21–29
**Dukla Prague** (Czech Republic)	52–48	(North Macedonia) Pelister	34–24	18–24
**Stord** (Norway)	77–51	(Kosovo) KH Prishtina	39–26	38–25
Ruislip Eagles HC (United Kingdom)	37–81^{f}	(Belgium) **HC Visé BM**	22–42	15–39
**Benfica** (Portugal)	61–57^{g}	(Norway) FyllingenBergen	33–32	28–25
**GAS Kilkis** (Greece)	40–39	(Greece) ASE Doukas	20–23	20–16
**Odorheiu Secuiesc** (Romania)	78–35^{h}	(United Kingdom) Cambridge HC	35–14	43–21

Notes

^{a} Both legs were hosted by Red Boys Differdange.
^{b} Both legs were hosted by Warrington Wolves HC.
^{c} Both legs were hosted by HB Dudelange.
^{d} Both legs were hosted by Riihimäki Cocks.

^{e} Both legs were hosted by Dobrudja.
^{f} Both legs were hosted by HC Visé.
^{g} Both legs were hosted by Benfica.
^{h} Both legs were hosted by Odorheiu Secuiesc.

=== Last 16 ===
==== Seedings ====
Pot 1	Pot 2
(Greece) GAS Kilkis (Israel) Holon (Luxembourg) HB Dudelange (Poland) KS Azoty-Puławy (Portugal) ABC Braga (Romania) Odorheiu Secuiesc (Serbia) Radnički Kragujevac (Ukraine) ZTR Zaporizhia	(Belgium) HC Visé BM (Czech Republic) Dukla Prague (Estonia) Põlva Serviti (Finland) Riihimäki Cocks (Israel) Ramat Hasharon HC (Luxembourg) Red Boys Differdange (Norway) Stord (Portugal) Benfica

==== Matches ====
Teams listed first played the first leg at home. Some teams agreed to play both matches in the same venue. Bolded teams qualified into quarter finals.

Team 1	Agg.	Team 2	1st leg	2nd leg
**Ramat Hasharon HC** (Israel)	59–46^{a}	(Greece) GAS Kilkis	29–19	30–27
HC Visé BM (Belgium)	56–67	(Poland) **KS Azoty-Puławy**	30–32	26–35
**Odorheiu Secuiesc** (Romania)	63–36^{b}	(Luxembourg) Red Boys Differdange	33–20	30–16
**Benfica** (Portugal)	64–54^{c}	(Luxembourg) HB Dudelange	36–30	28–24
**ABC Braga** (Portugal)	74–57	(Czech Republic) Dukla Prague	42–27	32–30
Põlva Serviti (Estonia)	47–49	(Ukraine) **ZTR Zaporizhia**	24–21	23–28
**Stord** (Norway)	54–50^{d}	(Serbia) Radnički Kragujevac	32–23	22–27
Holon (Israel)	52–75^{e}	(Finland) **Riihimäki Cocks**	28–35	24–40

Notes

^{a} Both legs were hosted by Ramat Hashron.
^{b} Both legs were hosted by Odorheiu Secuiesc.
^{c} Both legs were hosted by Benfica.

^{d} Both legs were hosted by Stord.
^{e} Both legs will be hosted by Riihimäki Cocks

=== Quarterfinals ===
The first legs were played on 14 and 15 March and the second legs were played on 21 and 22 April March. Teams listed first played the first leg at home. Bolded teams qualified into semifinals.

Team 1	Agg.	Team 2	1st leg	2nd leg
**Stord** (Norway)	60–52	(Israel) Ramat Hasharon HC	36–26	24–26
ZTR Zaporizhia (Ukraine)	38–48	(Romania) **Odorheiu Secuiesc**	18–26	20–22
Riihimäki Cocks (Finland)	49–65	(Portugal) **ABC Braga**	22–27	27–38
KS Azoty-Puławy (Poland)	61–68	(Portugal) **Benfica**	29–37	32–31

=== Semifinals ===
The first legs were played on 11 and 12 April and the second legs were played on 19 April 2015. Teams listed first played the first leg at home. Bolded teams qualified into finals.

Team 1	Agg.	Team 2	1st leg	2nd leg
**Odorheiu Secuiesc (Romania)**	58–54	(Portugal) Benfica	31–29	27–25
**ABC Braga (Portugal)**	50–45	(Norway) Stord	25–18	25–27

=== Final ===
The first leg was played on 17 May 2015 and the second Leg was played on 24 May 2015. Team listed first will play the first leg at home.

Team 1	Agg.	Team 2	1st leg	2nd leg
ABC Braga (Portugal)	57–60	(Romania) **Odorheiu Secuiesc**	32–28	25–32

== See also ==
- 2014–15 EHF Champions League
- 2014–15 EHF Cup
