= CSM Oradea (men's handball) =

Romanian handball team

- Full name: Clubul Sportiv Municipal Oradea
- Short name: CSM Oradea
- Founded: 2003; 22 years ago
- Arena: Arena Antonio Alexe
- Capacity: 2,000
- President: (Romania) Şerban Sere
- Head coach: (Romania) George Tăutu
- 2020-21: 6
- Club colours
Home	Away

CSM Oradea is a men's handball team based in Oradea, Bihor County, Romania. It competes in the 2020-2021 Divizia A seria D season.

== History ==
The men's handball was the first sports section of Oradea Municipal Sports Club and was established in 2003.

The handball team debuted in the country's 2nd tier, but gained promotion to the elite tier, where it played for one season. CSM Oradea was relegated back to the 2nd league, where it had many highly successful seasons, in which it dominated the competition.

CSM Oradea won Romania's 2nd handball division in 2014, 2015, 2017 and 2018. Also, in 2020, it won the group it was part of, qualifying for the semi-final tournament, but did not appear. Each time, due to financial reasons and the lack of interest of private financiers, the men's handball section could not take the step to the National League, but continued its activity in Division A (the 2nd echelon of the country).

== Honours ==
- Divizia A:
  - Winners (1): 2016-2017
- Divizia A:
  - Winners (1): 2017-2018
- Divizia A:
  - Winners (1): 2018-2019
- Divizia A:
  - Winners (1): 2019-2020
- Divizia A:
  - Place (6): 2020-2021

== Team ==
=== Current squad ===
Goalkeepers

- (Romania) Robert Ene
- (Romania) George Duma
- (Romania) Denis Indrie
- (Romania) Patrick Baltazar Cioc

Wingers

- (Romania) Ghiță Mateiaș
- (Romania) Poteră Alexandru
- (Romania) Farcas Alexandru
- (Romania) Baban Ionuț
- (Romania) Ștefan Bandi
- (Romania) Mlinarksik Marius

Line players

- (Romania) Gal Iulian
- (Romania) Gabriel Lari
- (Romania) Ionuț Huțan

Back players
LB

- (Romania) Csongor Szasz

CB

- (Romania) Răzvan Radu
- (Hungary) Szakacs Apor

RB

- (Romania) Breban George
- (Romania) Eduard Szilágyi

== Kits ==
HOME
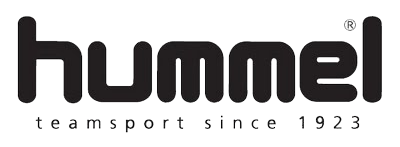
2017–18

AWAY
2017–18	2022–23

== See also ==
- CSM Oradea
