= Ionuț Stănescu =

Romanian handball player (born 1979)

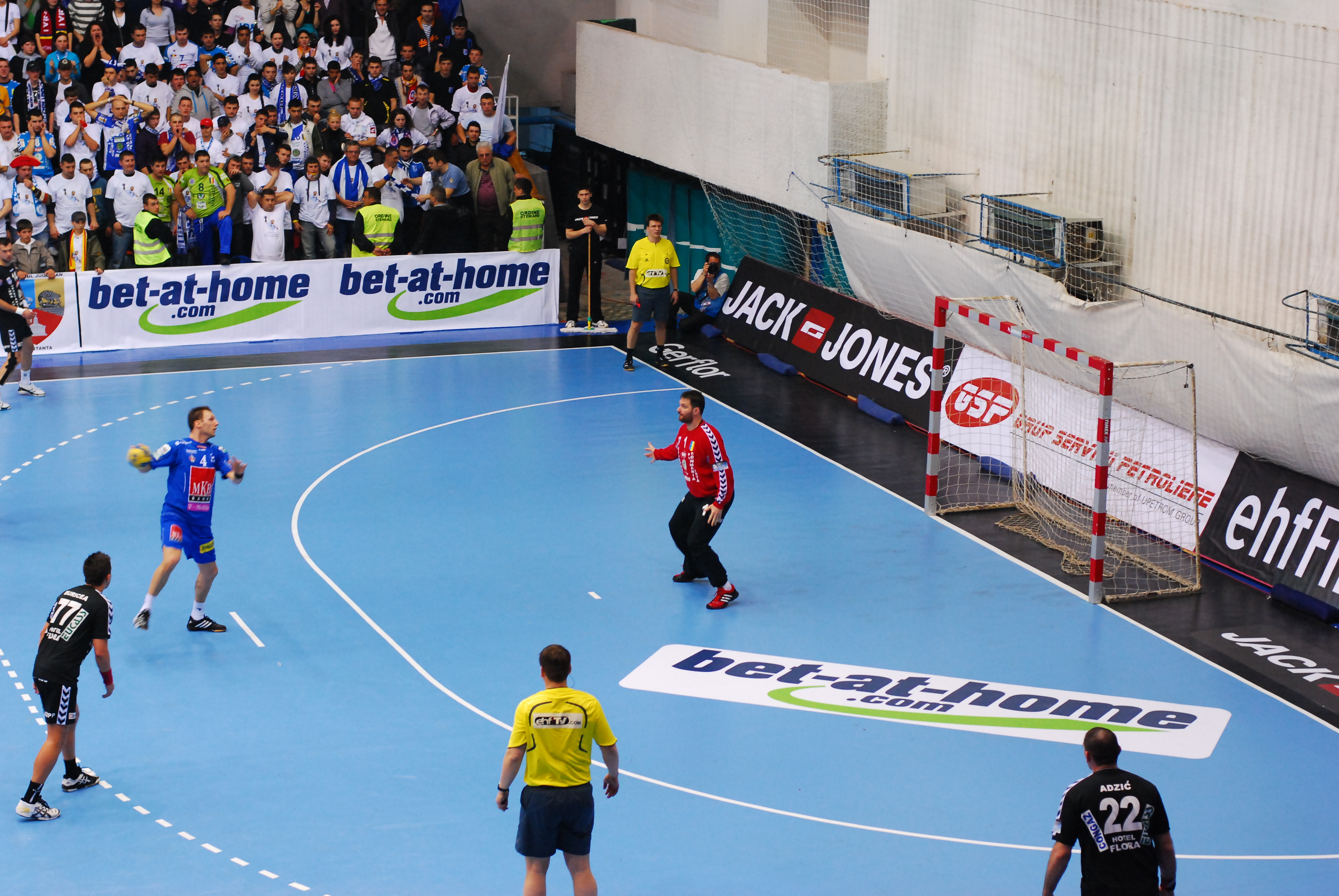
- Gergö Ivancsik executing a 7m throw against Romanian keeper Rudi Stănescu in an EHF Champions League game between KC Veszprém and HCM Constanţa

Personal information
- Full name: Ionuț Rudi Stănescu
- Nationality: Romanian
- Born: 14 August 1979 (age 47) Brașov, Romania
- Height: 1.96 m (6 ft 5 in)

Sport
- Sport: Handball
- Position: Goalkeeper
- Current club: Retired

Senior clubs
- Years: Team
- 1998–2001: Dinamo Baumit București
- 2001–2015: HCM Constanța
- 2015–2017: HC Dobrogea Sud
National team
- Years: Team
- –: Romania

Ionuț Stănescu (born 14 August 1979 in Brașov) is a retired Romanian handballer who last played for HC Dobrogea Sud Constanța.

For his services to the team and the city, and his exemplary sportsmanship conduct, Stănescu was made Honorary Citizen of Constanța in 2010.

== Achievements ==
- Liga Națională:
  - Winner: 2004, 2006, 2007, 2009, 2010, 2011, 2012
- Cupa României:
  - Winner: 2006, 2011, 2012
- EHF Cup Winners' Cup:
  - Semifinalist: 2006
  - Quarterfinalist: 2007, 2009
- EHF Challenge Cup:
  - Semifinalist: 2004

== Individual awards ==
- Romanian Handballer of the Year: 2006, 2007
