= 2012–13 Liga Națională (men's handball) =

Seasons
- ← 2011–12 2013–14 →

The 2012–13 Liga Națională was the 55th season of Romanian Handball League, the top-level men's professional handball league. The league comprises twelve teams. HCM Constanța were the defending champions, for the fifth time in a row.

== Teams ==
Location of teams in the Romanian Men's Handball League

Club	Ground(s)	Capacity
HCM Constanța	Sala Sporturilor (Constanța)	1,460
Știinţa Bacău	Sala Sporturilor (Bacău)	2,500
HC Odorheiu Secuiesc	Városi Sportcsarnok	1,250
CSU Bucovina Suceava	Sala LPS	424
ACS Potaissa Turda	Sala de sport "Gheorghe Baritiu"	600
CS Caraș-Severin	Sala Polivalentă (Reșița)	1,621
CSU Poli Timișoara	Sala Constantin Jude	1,540
CSM București	Sala Lucian Grigorescu	1,000
Pandurii Târgu Jiu	Sala Sporturilor (Târgu Jiu)	800
Dinamo București	Sala Sporturilor Romeo Iamandi	2,000
CSM Ploiești	Sala Sporturilor (Strejnic)	1,000
U Transilvania Cluj	Sala Sporturilor Horia Demian	3,000

== Standings ==
Pos	Team	Pld	W	D	L	GF	GA	GD	Pts	Qualification or relegation
1	HCM Constanța (C)	22	19	2	1	672	514	+158	40	2013–14 EHF Champions League
2	Ştiinţa Bacău	22	16	2	4	674	560	+114	34	2013–14 EHF Cup
3	HC Odorheiu Secuiesc	22	15	2	5	704	657	+47	32	2013–14 EHF Challenge Cup
4	Universitatea Suceava	22	14	2	6	637	603	+34	30	
5	ASC Potaissa Turda	22	13	1	8	678	633	+45	27	
6	CS Caraș - Severin Reșița	22	9	3	10	591	538	+53	21	2013–14 EHF Cup
7	Politehnica Timişoara	22	9	1	12	559	563	−4	19	
8	CSM București	22	7	2	13	610	646	−36	16	
9	Pandurii Târgu Jiu	22	8	0	14	550	597	−47	16	
10	Dinamo București	22	7	0	15	596	689	−93	14	
11	CSM Ploiești (R)	22	5	1	16	568	650	−82	11	Relegation to Divizia A
12	Universitatea Cluj-Napoca (R)	22	2	0	20	525	712	−187	4	Relegation to Divizia A

(C) Champions; (R) Relegated
