= 2011–12 Liga Națională (men's handball) =

Seasons
- 2010–11 2012–13

The 2011–12 Liga Națională was the 54th season of Romanian Handball League, the top-level men's professional handball league. The league comprises 14 teams. HCM Constanța were the defending champions, for the fourth time in a row.

== Standings ==
Pos	Team	Pld	W	D	L	GF	GA	GD	Pts	Qualification or relegation
1	HCM Constanța (C)	26	25	1	0	919	686	+233	51	2012–13 EHF Champions League
2	Ştiinţa Bacău	26	21	0	5	819	663	+156	42	2012–13 EHF Cup
3	HC Odorheiu Secuiesc	26	15	3	8	824	758	+66	33	2012–13 EHF Cup
4	CS Caraș - Severin Reșița	26	16	1	9	685	664	+21	33	
5	Universitatea Suceava	26	14	3	9	765	746	+19	31	2012–13 EHF Challenge Cup
6	Pandurii Târgu Jiu	26	14	2	10	748	748	0	30	
7	Politehnica Timişoara	26	11	2	13	675	665	+10	24	
8	ASC Potaissa Turda	26	11	2	13	740	744	−4	24	
9	Dinamo Călărași	26	10	2	14	727	748	−21	22	
10	CSM București	26	10	1	15	663	692	−29	21	
11	Universitatea Cluj-Napoca	26	8	2	16	692	755	−63	18	
12	CSM Ploiești	26	7	3	16	645	740	−95	17	
13	CSM Satu Mare (R)	26	6	2	18	702	809	−107	14	Relegation to Divizia A
14	Steaua București (R)	26	1	2	23	662	848	−186	4	Relegation to Divizia A

(C) Champions; (R) Relegated
