= 2013–14 EHF Cup =

International handball tournament

EHF Cup
- 2013–14
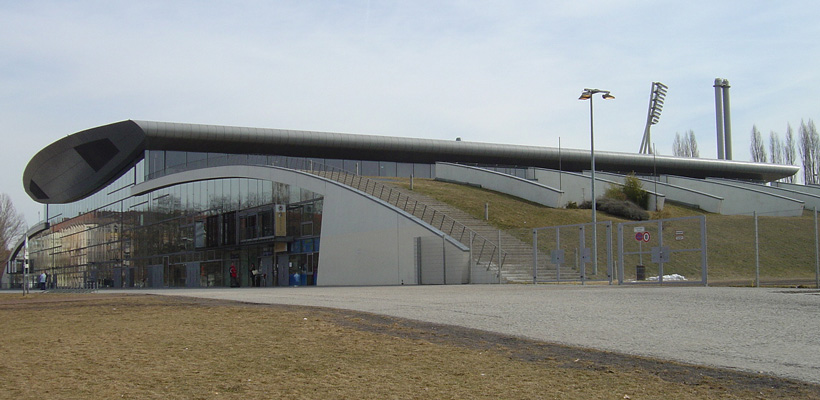
- The Max-Schmeling-Halle in Berlin, venue of the Final four tournament

Tournament information
- Sport: Handball
- Dates: 7 September 2013–18 May 2014
- Teams: 63 (qualification stage); 16 (group stage); 7 (knockout stage)

Final positions
- Champions: (Hungary) Pick Szeged (1st title)
- Runner-up: (France) Montpellier AHB

Tournament statistics
- Matches played: 58
- Goals scored: 3249 (56.02 per match)
- Attendance: 167,304 (2,885 per match)
- Top scorer: (Slovenia) Dragan Gajić (72 goals)

The 2013–14 EHF Cup was the 33rd edition of the EHF Cup and the second edition since the merger of the EHF Cup with the EHF Cup Winners' Cup. In the present format, the tournament began in early September with three knockout qualifying rounds, which concluded by late November. The 16 surviving teams were then allocated into four groups of four, where teams played against each other home-and-away in a round-robin format. The four group winners and four runners-up qualified to the quarter-finals, with each of the quarter-final winners proceeding to the Final 4 tournament played in May 2014. However, because the hosts of the Final 4 tournament, Füchse Berlin, finished the group stage among the group winners, they have clinched the direct ticket to the final weekend and decided that only three quarter-finals were played for the remaining spots in the final tournament as only the top three second-placed teams qualified to the quarter-finals. The final tournament was won by Hungarian side Pick Szeged.

== Bids for the Final 4 venue ==
There were a total of seven bids submitted to the EHF for hosting the 2013–14 EHF Cup final four tournament that will take place in May 2014. The list of bidders consists of five clubs participating in the 2013–14 EHF Cup and two external stakeholders. In order to host the final four tournament a venue must fulfill a set of criteria that reflects the nature of a high-profile international club event such as the EHF Cup Finals. The decision who will host the tournament was decided by the EHF and its marketing arm EHF Marketing GmbH.

On 5 December 2013 in Vienna, Austria the EHF President Jean Brihault signed an official contract with Füchse Berlin's manager Bob Henning for organization of the final four tournament, which will take place between 17 and 18 May 2014. The four games of the finals will be organized in the Max-Schmeling-Halle in the German capital Berlin. The German organizers expect at least 10,000 people for each day of the final weekend.

Final four venue †

Team	Venue	City	Capacity
AEK Athens	Olympic Hall	Athens, Greece	18,500
Meshkov Brest	Minsk Arena	Minsk, Belarus	15,000
Montpellier	Park&Suites Arena	Montpellier, France	9,000
Füchse Berlin†	Max-Schmeling-Halle	Berlin, Germany	8,700
—	Porsche Arena	Stuttgart, Germany	6,500
London GD	Copper Box Arena	London, United Kingdom	6,000
—	Coque Arena	Luxembourg, Luxembourg	5,400

== Overview ==
=== Team allocation ===
The labels in the parentheses show how each team qualified for the place of its starting round:

- 2nd, 3rd, 4th, 5th, 6th, etc.: League position
- ECL: Transferred from the EHF Champions League
  - QS: Losers from the qualification tournaments
  - WC: Losers from the wildcard matches

Round 3
(Germany) TSV Hannover-Burgdorf (5th)	(Slovakia) Tatran Prešov (ECL QS)	(Austria) Alpla HC Hard (ECL QS)	(Germany) Füchse Berlin (ECL WC)
(Spain) Ademar León (4th)	(Greece) AEK Athens (ECL QS)	(Romania) HCM Constanța (ECL QS)	(Hungary) Pick Szeged (ECL WC)
(Denmark) Aarhus (3rd)	(Serbia) Vojvodina (ECL QS)	(Norway) Elverum (ECL QS)	(France) Montpellier (ECL WC)
Round 2
(Spain) Aragón (5th)	(Russia) Kaustik Volgograd (6th)	(Portugal) Benfica (2nd)	(Belarus) SKA Minsk (2nd)
(France) Chambéry (4th)	(Hungary) Csurgó (3rd)	(Portugal) Sporting (3rd)	(Greece) Diomidis Argous (2nd)
(France) Nantes (5th)	(Switzerland) Kadetten Schaffhausen (2nd)	(Sweden) IFK Kristianstad (2nd)	(Luxembourg) Handball Esch (ECL QS)
(Denmark) Skjern (4th)	(Switzerland) Pfadi Winterthur (3rd)	(Sweden) Lugi HF (3rd)	(Turkey) Beşiktaş (ECL QS)
(Denmark) Mors-Thy (5th)	(Croatia) Nexe Našice (2nd)	(North Macedonia) Strumica (3rd)	(Bosnia and Herzegovina) Borac Banja Luka (ECL QS)
(Slovenia) Maribor Branik (4th)	(Croatia) Poreč (3rd)	(Serbia) Partizan (2nd)	(Netherlands) KRAS/Volendam (ECL QS)
(Russia) SKIF Krasnodar (3rd)	(Romania) SMD Bacău (2nd)	(Ukraine) Portovik (2nd)	
(Russia) GK Permskie Medvedi (4th)	(Romania) Caraș Severin Reșița (3rd)	(Norway) ØIF Arendal (2nd)	
Round 1
(Hungary) Tatabánya (4th)	(Israel) Maccabi Tel Aviv (1st)	(Luxembourg) Handball Käerjeng (2nd)	(Estonia) Põlva Serviti (1st)
(Switzerland) TSV St. Otmar St. Gallen (4th)	(Israel) Maccabi Rishon LeZion (2nd)	(Montenegro) Lovćen (1st)	(Bulgaria) HC Dobrudja (1st)
(Norway) Fyllingen Håndball (3rd)	(Slovakia) HC Sporta Hlohovec (2nd)	(Iceland) Haukar (1st)	(Kosovo) Prishtina (1st)
(Belarus) Meshkov Brest (3rd)	(Turkey) Ankaraspor (2nd)	(Czech Republic) Ronal Jičín (1st)	(United Kingdom) London GD (1st)
(Austria) Bregenz (2nd)	(Netherlands) OCI-Lions (2nd)	(Belgium) HC Achilles Bocholt (CW)	(Lithuania) Dragūnas Klaipėda (1st)

== Qualification stage ==
=== Round 1 ===
Teams listed first played the first leg at home. Some teams agreed to play both matches in the same venue. Highlighted teams qualified into the second round.

Team 1	Agg.	Team 2	1st leg	2nd leg
Meshkov Brest (Belarus)	59–43	(Israel) Maccabi Rishon LeZion	25–19	34–24
HC Sporta Hlohovec (Slovakia)	57–52	(Switzerland) TSV St. Otmar St. Gallen	29–21	28–31
OCI-Lions (Netherlands)	51–66	(Iceland) Haukar	33–36	18–30
Ronal Jičín (Czech Republic)	72–30	(Bulgaria) HC Dobrudja	35–15	37–15
Handball Käerjeng (Luxembourg)	56–57	(Lithuania) Dragūnas Klaipėda	30–30	26–27
Tatabánya (Hungary)	65–52	(Belgium) HC Achilles Bocholt	30–22	35–30
London GD (United Kingdom)	32–82	(Turkey) Ankaraspor	14–44	18–38
Maccabi Tel Aviv (Israel)	67–64	(Montenegro) Lovćen	37–35	30–29
Põlva Serviti (Estonia)	49–62	(Norway) Fyllingen Håndball	27–30	22–32
Prishtina (Kosovo)	50–63	(Austria) Bregenz	22–28	28–35

Notes

1. The second leg match between Meshkov Brest and Maccabi Rishon LeZion was played in Brest, Belarus, with Maccabi Rishon LeZion being the official hosts.
2. The first leg match between OCI-Lions and Haukar was played in Hafnarfjörður, Iceland, with OCI-Lions being the official hosts.
3. The second leg match between Ronal Jičín and Dobrudja was played in Jičín, Czech Republic, with Dobrudja being the official hosts.
4. The first leg match between London GD and Ankaraspor was played in Ankara, Turkey, with London GD being the official hosts.
5. The second leg match between Maccabi Tel Aviv and Lovćen was played in Ra'anana, Israel, with Lovćen being the official hosts.

=== Round 2 ===
Teams listed first played the first leg at home. Some teams agreed to play both matches in the same venue. Highlighted teams qualified into the third round.

Team 1	Agg.	Team 2	1st leg	2nd leg
IFK Kristianstad (Sweden)	62–47	(Luxembourg) Handball Esch	32–19	30–28
Csurgói (Hungary)	58–52	(Spain) Aragón	30–27	28–25
Kaustik Volgograd (Russia)	57–54	(Romania) Caraș Severin Reșița	31–26	26–28
Beşiktaş (Turkey)	59–56	(Switzerland) Pfadi Winterthur	29–29	30–27
HC Sporta Hlohovec (Slovakia)	63–49	(Bosnia and Herzegovina) Borac Banja Luka	36–23	27–26
Ronal Jičín (Czech Republic)	42–67	(Denmark) Skjern	21–38	21–29
Permskie Medvedi (Russia)	51–59	(Belarus) Meshkov Brest	26–30	25–29
Nexe Našice (Croatia)	54–53	(Greece) Diomidis Argous	26–22	28–31
Lugi HF (Sweden)	51–47	(Hungary) Tatabánya	27–27	24–20
SMD Bacău (Romania)	65–49	(Lithuania) Dragūnas Klaipėda	36–21	29–28
SKIF Krasnodar (Russia)	47–58	(Croatia) Poreč	25–29	22–29
Benfica (Portugal)	68–41	(Iceland) Haukar	34–19	34-22
Chambéry (France)	66–46	(Turkey) Ankaraspor	34–26	32–20
Kadetten Schaffhausen (Switzerland)	66–54	(Ukraine) Portovik	33–28	33–26
Mors-Thy (Denmark)	54–45	(Norway) Fyllingen Håndball	26–18	28–27
SKA Minsk (Belarus)	53–55	(Norway) ØIF Arendal	27–30	26–25
Sporting (Portugal)	65–50	(Netherlands) KRAS/Volendam	30–18	35–32
Maccabi Tel Aviv (Israel)	49–56	(North Macedonia) Strumica	26–26	23–30
Partizan (Serbia)	39–50	(France) Nantes	15–22	24–28
Bregenz (Austria)	49–62	(Slovenia) Maribor Branik	26–25	23–37

Notes

6. The second leg match between Kaustik Volgograd and Caraș Severin Reșița was played in Volgograd, Russia, with Caraș Severin Reșița being the official hosts.
7. The second leg match between Sporta Hlohovec and Borac was played in Hlohovec, Slovakia, with Borac being the official hosts.
8. The second leg match between Chambéry Savoie and Ankaraspor was played in Chambéry, France, with Ankaraspor being the official hosts.
9. The second leg match between Kadetten Schaffhausen and Portovik was played in Schaffhausen, Switzerland, with Portovik being the official hosts.
10. The first leg match between SKA Minsk and ØIF Arendal was played in Arendal, Norway, with SKA Minsk being the official hosts.

=== Round 3 ===
Before the draw, which took place on 22 October 2013 at the EHF headquarters in Vienna, 32 teams from 20 countries were divided into two pots without the country protection rule, meaning that two teams from the same country could face each other. The first legs were played on 23–24 November and the second legs one week later.

Teams listed first played the first leg at home. Highlighted teams qualified into the group stage.

Team 1	Agg.	Team 2	1st leg	2nd leg
ØIF Arendal (Norway)	47–52	(Slovakia) HC Sporta Hlohovec	20–26	27–26
Füchse Berlin (Germany)	43–40	(Belarus) Meshkov Brest	22–20	21–20
Chambéry (France)	56–55	(Austria) Alpla HC Hard	31-30	25–25
Mors-Thy (Denmark)	52–59	(Romania) HCM Constanța	26–27	26–32
Poreč (Croatia)	49–54	(Portugal) Sporting	24–24	25–30
Aarhus (Denmark)	53–59	(North Macedonia) Strumica	29–26	24–33
Skjern (Denmark)	55–42	(Serbia) Vojvodina	31–24	24–18
Nantes (France)	52–44	(Norway) Elverum	28–21	24–23
Benfica (Portugal)	49–56	(Hungary) Pick Szeged	24–25	25–31
Beşiktaş (Turkey)	54–65	(Hungary) Csurgói	29–31	25–34
IFK Kristianstad (Sweden)	63–52	(Romania) SMD Bacău	40–25	23–27
Nexe Našice (Croatia)	62–62 (a)	(Spain) Ademar León	34–29	28–33
Kadetten Schaffhausen (Switzerland)	55–69	(Germany) TSV Hannover-Burgdorf	28–28	27–41
Tatran Prešov (Slovakia)	62–56	(Slovenia) Maribor Branik	34–26	28–30
Kaustik Volgograd (Russia)	55–73	(France) Montpellier	26–38	29–35
AEK Athens (Greece)	45–49	(Sweden) Lugi HF	22–24	23–25

== Group stage ==
Location of teams of the 2013–14 EHF Cup group stage.
Red: Group A; Blue: Group B; Green: Group C; Yellow: Group D.

=== Draw and format ===
The draw of the EHF Cup group phase was carried out on 5 December 2013 in Vienna, Austria. The teams were positioned into four pots, with the country protection rule applied: two clubs from the same country may not face each other in the same group.

The group stage features 16 teams, which were allocated four groups of four. In each group, teams play against each other home-and-away in a round-robin format. The matchdays are 8–9 February, 15–16 February, 22–23 February, 15–16 March, 22–23 March, and 29–30 March 2014. The top two teams from each group qualified for the quarter-finals, which were scheduled in April 2013.

If Füchse Berlin, as the organiser of the Final 4 tournament, win their group or finish among top three second-ranked teams, they will receive a direct qualification to the Final 4 tournament. If the German side wins their group then the other three group winners and the three best second ranked team will qualify for the quarter-finals. If the Germans finish among the top three second-ranked teams, the quarter-finals will consist of four group winners and two best second-ranked teams. If Füchse Berlin finish as the worst second-ranked team, they will have to play the quarter-final match. Should the German club rank on the third or fourth position in their group, they will be out of the competition, but they will still organize the Final 4 tournament.

If two or more teams are equal on points on completion of the group matches, the following criteria are applied to determine the rankings (in descending order):

1. number of points in matches of all teams directly involved;
2. goal difference in matches of all teams directly involved;
3. greater number of plus goals in matches of all teams directly involved;
4. goal difference in all matches of the group;
5. greater number of plus goals in all matches of the group;

If no ranking can be determined, a decision shall be obtained by drawing lots. Lots shall be drawn by the EHF, if possible in the presence of a responsible of each club.

Pot 1	Pot 2	Pot 3	Pot 4
(Hungary) Pick Szeged	(Slovakia) Tatran Prešov	(Sweden) Lugi HF	(Sweden) IFK Kristianstad
(France) Montpellier	(Denmark) Skjern	(France) Chambéry	(Hungary) Csurgó
(Germany) Füchse Berlin	(Romania) Constanța	(France) Nantes	(Slovakia) HC Sporta Hlohovec
(Germany) Hannover	(Spain) Ademar León	(North Macedonia) Strumica	(Portugal) Sporting

Key to colours in group tables
Teams that have qualified to the next phase of the competition

=== Group A ===
Team	Pld	W	D	L	GF	GA	GD	Pts	LHF	ADE	CSK	HAN
(Sweden) Lugi HF	6	3	1	2	171	169	+2	7	—	30–30	28–26	32–28
(Spain) Ademar León	6	2	2	2	173	164	+9	6	32–27	—	28–19	30–30
(Hungary) Csurgó	6	3	0	3	163	160	+3	6	25–22	31–27	—	36–28
(Germany) TSV Hannover-Burgdorf	6	2	1	3	168	182	−14	5	28–32	27–26	27–26	—

=== Group B ===
Team	Pld	W	D	L	GF	GA	GD	Pts	MON	SPO	SKJ	STR
(France) Montpellier	6	6	0	0	192	147	+45	12	—	36–31	27–25	41–22
(Portugal) Sporting	6	4	0	2	195	165	+30	8	27–30	—	30–28	39–22
(Denmark) Skjern	6	2	0	4	156	158	−2	4	23–26	25–32	—	31–20>
(North Macedonia) Strumica	6	0	0	6	130	203	−73	0	19–32	24–36	23–24	—

=== Group C ===
Team	Pld	W	D	L	GF	GA	GD	Pts	SZE	NAN	TAT	IFK
(Hungary) Pick Szeged	6	5	0	1	174	159	+15	10	—	28–27	37–31	29–18
(France) Nantes	6	4	0	2	176	154	+22	8	31–23	—	37–27	25–23
(Slovakia) Tatran Prešov	6	2	0	4	181	198	−17	4	29–31	30–29	—	37–30
(Sweden) IFK Kristianstad	6	1	0	5	151	171	−20	2	23–26	23–27	34–27	—

=== Group D ===
Team	Pld	W	D	L	GF	GA	GD	Pts	BER	CON	CHA	HLO
(Germany) Füchse Berlin (Note: Füchse Berlin finished the group stage among the group winners and has qualified directly to the final four tournament.)	6	4	2	0	181	164	+17	10	—	28–26	30–27	34–28
(Romania) Constanța	6	3	2	1	173	160	+13	8	31–31	—	29–25	31–22
(France) Chambéry	6	2	2	2	162	158	+4	6	25–25	29–29	—	27–21
(Slovakia) HC Sporta Hlohovec	6	0	0	6	147	181	−34	0	27–33	25–27	24–29	—

=== Ranking of the second-placed teams ===
The ranking of the second-placed teams is carried out on the basis of the team's results in the group stage. Because the German side Füchse Berlin, the organizers of the Final 4 tournament, finished on top of their group they qualified directly to the final tournament and only the top three second-placed teams qualified to the quarter-finals.

Grp	Team	Pld	W	D	L	GF	GA	GD	Pts
B	(Portugal) Sporting	6	4	0	2	195	165	+30	8
C	(France) Nantes	6	4	0	2	176	154	+22	8
D	(Romania) Constanța	6	3	2	1	173	160	+13	8
A	(Spain) Ademar León	6	2	2	2	173	164	+9	6

== Knockout stage ==
=== Quarter-finals ===
==== Draw and format ====
Because the hosts of the Final 4 tournament, Füchse Berlin, finished the group stage among the group winners, they have clinched the direct ticket to the final weekend and decided that only three quarter-finals will be played for the remaining spots in the final tournament. The draw of the EHF Cup quarter-finals was carried out on Tuesday 1 April 2014 at the EHF headquarters in Vienna, Austria. Six teams were positioned into two pots with the country protection rule not applied: two clubs from the same country could face each other in the quarter-finals. However, teams from the same group cannot face each other in the quarter-finals. The first pot contained the three group winners and the second pot contained the top three second-placed teams.

In the quarter-finals, teams played against each other on a home-and-away basis, with the teams from second pot playing the first leg at home. The first leg matches were played over 19–21 April, and the second leg matches were played over 26–27 April.

Pot 1
(Sweden) Lugi HF
(France) Montpellier
(Hungary) Pick Szeged

Pot 2
(Portugal) Sporting
(France) HBC Nantes
(Romania) Constanța

Team 1	Agg.	Team 2	1st leg	2nd leg
Constanța (Romania)	59–55	(Sweden) Lugi HF	31–21	28–34
Sporting (Portugal)	51–56	(Hungary) Pick Szeged	29–27	22–28
HBC Nantes (France)	49–59	(France) Montpellier	25–26	24–33

=== Final four ===
The tournament was played at the 8,700 capacity Max-Schmeling-Halle in the German capital Berlin, the home of Füchse Berlin.

Semi-finals
17 May
(Romania) Constanța	32
(France) Montpellier	36
17 May
(Germany) Füchse Berlin	22
(Hungary) Pick Szeged	24

Final
18 May
(France) Montpellier	28
(Hungary) Pick Szeged	29
Third place
18 May
(Romania) Constanța	28
(Germany) Füchse Berlin	29

== Top goalscorers ==
Rank	Name	Team	Goals
1	(Slovenia) Dragan Gajić	(France) Montpellier	72
2	(Romania) Alexandru Șimicu	(Romania) Constanța	66
3	(Portugal) Pedro Portela	(Portugal) Sporting	60
4	(Hungary) Zsolt Balogh	(Hungary) Pick Szeged	57
5	(Romania) Alexandru Csepreghi	(Romania) Constanța	52
6	(Sweden) Jonas Erik Larholm	(Hungary) Pick Szeged	49
7	(Portugal) Pedro Solha	(Portugal) Sporting	48
7	(Romania) Laurențiu Toma	(Romania) Constanța	48
9	(Slovenia) Jure Dolenec	(France) Montpellier	45
10	(Spain) Jorge Maqueda-Peño	(France) Nantes	43

== See also ==
- 2013–14 EHF Champions League
- 2013–14 EHF Challenge Cup
