= Energia Lignitul Pandurii Târgu Jiu =

Handball team from Romania

- Founded: 1960
- Dissolved: 2016
- Arena: Sala Sporturilor
- Capacity: 1,500
- Head coach: Liviu Andrieş
- League: Liga Națională
- 2015-16: Liga Naţională, 9th

Energia Lignitul Pandurii Târgu Jiu was a handball team from Târgu Jiu, Romania, that played in the Romanian Liga Naţională.

== Kits ==
AWAY

2014–15

== History ==
The team was founded in 1960. They were promoted in Divizia A (today Liga Națională) after the 1995-96 season of Diviza B (today Divizia A) and played several seasons in the first league, in which they won third place two times. The team also played two finals of the Romanian Cup against HCM Constanța in 2011 and against HC Minaur Baia Mare in 2015. They competed for the first time in the 2006-2007 EHF Cup season and competed one time in the 2011-2012 season of the EHF Cup Winners' Cup.

== Achievements ==
=== Leagues ===
Liga Națională

- Bronze: 2006, 2010

Divizia A

- Gold: 1996

=== Cups ===
Cupa României

- Silver: 2011, 2015

Supercupa României

- Silver: 2015

=== European ===
EHF Cup

- Round 2: 2006-07, 2010-11

EHF Cup Winners' Cup

- Last 16: 2011-12
