= CSM Ploiești (men's handball) =

Romanian men's handball club

- Full name: Club Sportiv Municipal Ploiești
- Short name: CSM Ploiești
- Founded: 2004
- Arena: Olimpia Sports Hall, Ploiești
- Capacity: 3,500
- President: (Romania) Paul Iancu
- League: Divizia A
- 2018–19: Divizia A, Seria B, 6th
- Club colours

CSM Ploiești is a men's handball club from Ploiești, Romania, that plays in the Divizia A, second tier of the Romanian handball league system.
