= Romanian Men's Handball Cup =

Cupa României
- Founded: 1977; 49 years ago
- Administrator: Romanian Handball Federation
- Sports fielded: Handball
- Country: Romania
- Most recent champion: Dinamo București (10th title) (2025-26)
- Most titles: Dinamo București (10 titles)
- Website: frh.ro

The Romanian Men's Handball Cup (Romanian: Cupa României Masculin) is the nationwide cup tournament for men's handball in Romania. It was founded in 1977 and is administrated by the Romanian Handball Federation.

The most recent Champions are Dinamo București, which them the most winning team in the history of the competition.

== Winners ==
Year	Winner
1978	HC Minaur Baia Mare
1979	Dinamo București
1980	not held
1981	CSA Steaua București
1982	Dinamo București
1983	HC Minaur Baia Mare
1984	HC Minaur Baia Mare
1985	CSA Steaua București
1986	Politehnica Timișoara
1987	not held
1988	Dinamo București
1989	HC Minaur Baia Mare
1990	CSA Steaua București
1991	Universitatea Craiova
1992 - 1996	not held
1997	CSA Steaua București
1998	not held
1999	HC Minaur Baia Mare
2000	CSA Steaua București
2001	CSA Steaua București
2002	Fibrexnylon Săvinești
2003	Fibrexnylon Săvinești

Year	Club
2004	Fibrexnylon Săvinești
2005	not held
2006	CSM Constanța
2007	CSA Steaua București
2008	CSA Steaua București
2009	CSA Steaua București
2010	CS UCM Reșița
2011	CSM Constanța
2012	CSM Constanța
2013	CSM Constanța
2014	CSM Constanța
2015	HC Minaur Baia Mare
2016	CSM București
2017	Dinamo București
2018	Dobrogea Sud Constanța
2019	Politehnica Timișoara
2020	Dinamo București
2021	Dinamo București
2022	Dinamo București
2023	CSM Constanța
2024	Dinamo București
2025	Dinamo București
2026	Dinamo București

=== Winners by club ===
Rank	Club	Number of titles	Years
1	Dinamo București	10	1979, 1982, 1988, 2017, 2020, 2021, 2022, 2024, 2025, 2026
2	CSA Steaua București	9	1981, 1985, 1990, 1997, 2000, 2001, 2007, 2008, 2009
3	CSM Constanța	7	2006, 2011, 2012, 2013, 2014, 2018, 2023
4	HC Minaur Baia Mare	6	1978, 1983, 1984, 1989, 1999, 2015
5	Fibrexnylon Săvineşti	3	2002, 2003, 2004
6	Politehnica Timișoara	2	1986, 2019
7	Universitatea Craiova	1	1991
7	CS UCM Reșița	1	2010
7	CSM București	1	2016
