= CSM Constanța (men's handball) =

Handball team from Constanța, Romania

- Full name: Clubul Sportiv Municipal Constanța
- Short name: Constanța
- Founded: 2015; 11 years ago
- Arena: Sala Sporturilor
- Capacity: 1,500
- President: (Romania) Ionuț Stănescu
- Head coach: (Romania) Marius Stavrositu
- League: Liga Națională
- 2024–25: Liga Națională, 5th of 14
- Club colours
Home	Away

CSM Constanța is a handball team from Constanța, Romania, that competes in the Romanian Liga Națională. Formed in July 2015 as HC Dobrogea Sud Constanța after the dissolution of HCM Constanța (due to the high debts that the club had accumulated), the team merged in 2022 with the newly formed multi-sports club CSM Constanța, as its men's handball section. After one year in the second division (the 2015-16 season), the team was promoted to the Liga Națională.

== History ==
The team was founded in 2015.

== Crest, colours, supporters ==
=== Club crest ===
Old Logo
(-2022)

=== Kits ===
HOME

2014–15

AWAY
2014–15	2019–20	2020–21

== Honours ==
- Liga Națională
  - Runners-up (1): 2019
- Cupa României
  - Winners (2): 2018, 2023
- Supercupa României
  - Winners (2): 2017, 2021

== Team ==
=== Current squad ===
Squad for the 2024–25 season

Goalkeepers

- 1 (Romania) Vladut Rusu

Left Wingers

Right Wingers

Line players

- 22 (Argentina) Gastón Mouriño

Left Backs

- 8 (Georgia (country)) Irakli Chikovani

Central Backs

- 14 (Romania) Călin Mihai Căbuț

Right Backs

- 13 (Belarus) Mikalai Aliokhin
- 27 (Romania) Nicolae Ungureanu

=== Transfers ===
Transfers for the 2026–27 season

Joining

- (Tunisia) Fradj Ben Tekaya (GK) from (Spain) BM Huesca
- (Brazil) Anderson Mollino (RB) from (Romania) CS Minaur Baia Mare
- (Romania) Gabriel Ilie (LB) from (Serbia) RK Partizan
- (Romania) Liviu Caba (CB) from (Serbia) RK Partizan
- (Romania) Gabriel Cumpănici (LB) from (Romania) CS Minaur Baia Mare
- (Romania) Bogdan Cătălin Rață (LP) from (Romania) HC Buzău

Leaving

- (Romania) Daniel Susanu (LP) to (Romania) HC Buzău

=== Transfer History ===
Transfers for the 2025–26 season

Joining

- (Angola) Gabriel Teca (LP) from (Romania) CSM Sighişoara
- (France) Adama Sako (LB) from (Greece) AEK Athens
- (Ukraine) Vitalii Shimanskyi (GK) from (Romania) CSM București
- (Romania) Gabriel Bujor (RW) from (Romania) CSM Bacău
- (Romania) Mihai Bujor (CB) from (Romania) CSM Bacău
- (Romania) Mihai Dobra (CB) from (Romania) HC Odorheiu Secuiesc
- (Romania) Alexandru Mihai Pasca (GK) from (Romania) Steaua București
- (Romania) Marius Ionut Closca (GK) from (Romania) CSM Focșani
- (Romania) Tudor Buguleț (RW) from (Romania) Dinamo București
- (Romania) Daniel Susanu (LP) back from loan at (Romania) HC Buzău

Leaving

- (Russia) Vitaly Komogorov (LB) to (Romania) HC Buzău
- (Belarus) Mikalai Aliokhin (RB) to (Belarus) HC Meshkov Brest
- (Croatia) Valentino Ravnić (LW) to (Romania) SCM Politehnica Timișoara
- (Serbia) Zoran Nikolić (LP) to (Romania) SCM Politehnica Timișoara
- (Serbia) Strahinja Stanković (RW) to (Serbia) RK Partizan
- (Romania) Andrei Buzle (LB) from (Romania) Dinamo București
- (Romania) Ionuț Nistor (RW) from (Romania) Dinamo București
- (Romania) Gabriel Ilie (LB) to (Serbia) RK Partizan
- (Romania) Dan Vasile (GK) to (Romania) SCM Politehnica Timișoara
- (Romania) Alexandru Andrei (LW) to (Romania) SCM Politehnica Timișoara
- (Romania) (Hungary) Andras Szasz (LP) to (Romania) SCM Politehnica Timișoara
- (Romania) Andrei Drăgan (CB) to (Romania) CSM București

=== Coaching staff ===
Staff for the 2023–24 season

Pos.	Name
Head coach	(Romania) George Buricea
Assistant coach	(Romania) Ionut Puscasu
Goalkeeping coach	(Bosnia and Herzegovina) Mario Blazević
Fitness coach	(Romania) Nicu Roman
Kinetotherapist	
Team Leader	(Romania) Silviu Bãiceanu

== HCM Constanța (2002-2015) ==
=== Honours ===
- Liga Națională (9):
  - Winners: 2004, 2006, 2007, 2009, 2010, 2011, 2012, 2013, 2014
- Cupa României (5):
  - Winners: 2006, 2011, 2012, 2013, 2014
- Supercupa României (4):
  - Winners: 2008, 2011, 2013, 2014
- EHF Cup:
  - Fourth place: 2014
- EHF Cup Winners' Cup:
  - Semifinalists: 2006
  - Quarterfinalists: 2007, 2009
- EHF Challenge Cup:
  - Semifinalists: 2004

=== Notable players ===
- (Romania) Mihai Popescu
- (Romania) Ionuț Stănescu
- (Romania) Laurențiu Toma
- (Romania) Marius Sadoveac
- (Romania) Alexandru Csepreghi
- (Romania) George Buricea
- (Romania) Marius Stavrositu
- (Romania) Bogdan Criciotoiu
- (Romania) Javier Humet
- (Serbia) Milutin Dragicevic
- (Serbia) Dalibor Čutura
- (Serbia) Nemanja Mladenović
- (Serbia) Nikola Crnoglavac
- (Serbia) Zoran Nikolić
- (Serbia) Dane Šijan
- (Serbia) Predrag Vujadinović
- (Montenegro) Mladen Rakčević
- (Montenegro) Stevan Vujović
- (Montenegro) Aleksandar Adžić
- (North Macedonia) Branislav Angelovski
- (North Macedonia) Nikola Mitrevski
- (North Macedonia) Velko Markoski
- (Belarus) Viachaslau Saldatsenka
- (Croatia) Janko Kević
- (Bosnia and Herzegovina) Dejan Malinović
- (Hungary) Timuzsin Schuch
- (Georgia (country)) Irakli Chikovani
