= HC Odorheiu Secuiesc =

- Full name: Handbal Club Odorheiu Secuiesc
- Short name: Odorhei
- Founded: 2005; 20 years ago
- Arena: Sala Sporturilor
- Capacity: 1,300
- Head coach: Dragan Đukić
- League: Divizia A
- 2018–19: Divizia A, Seria D, 2nd
- Club colours
Home	Away

Handbal Club Odorheiu Secuiesc (in Hungarian: Székelyudvarhelyi Kézilabda Club, commonly abbreviated SzKC) is a Romanian team handball club based in Odorheiu Secuiesc.

Founded in the summer 2005 as Junior Kézilabda Club, the team entered the Romanian second division yet in that year. They won promotion to the top level championship in 2007 and two years later they already debuted on continental level, playing in the EHF Challenge Cup.

In 2011 the team achieved their best ever result by finishing runners-up in the league, with that they earned the right to participate in the 2011–12 edition of the EHF Cup.

To ensure that the handball in the town got not only past and present, the club runs a broad youth program, in which they co-operate with more than thirty schools in Harghita, Covasna and Mureş counties, with over 500 schoolboys attending on trainings in a number of age groups.

In January 2018, after the death of Attila Verestóy, founder and main sponsor of the club, Odorheiu Secuiesc could not further manage the financials of a top flight club, subsequently they withdrawn from the national championship and declared all of their players free agents.

== Honours ==
- Liga Națională:
  - Silver: 2011
  - Bronze: 2012, 2013
- EHF European Cup:
  - Winner: 2015

== Supporters ==
=== Fan Club ===
The Fan Club is the official supporters group of the team, which was created in October 2010 and counts over 100 members. Beside following the club on away matches and organizing meetings and inquiries that bring the supporters and players closer to each other, they also participate on events that promote the sport in the city.
