= CS Caraș - Severin Reșița =

Men's handball club from Romania

CS Caraș-Severin
- Full name: Clubul Sportiv Caraș-Severin
- Founded: 2004
- Dissolved: 2014
- Arena: Sala Polivalentă
- Capacity: 1,669

CS Caraș-Severin, formerly known as UCM HC Caraș-Severin, was a professional men's handball club from Reșița, Romania. The team reached twice the second spot in the Romanian Handball League, and won the Romanian Cup once.

In 2014, after the team relegated from the first division, the Local Council of Reșița decided to dissolve the club.

== Achievements ==
- Romanian League:
  - Runners-up (2): 2009, 2010
- Romanian Cup:
  - Winners (1): 2010
  - Runners-up (2): 2009
- EHF European Cup:
  - Winners (3): 2007, 2008, 2009
