= EHF European Cup =

European handball cup competition

- Current season, competition or edition: 2026–27 EHF European Cup
- Sport: Handball
- Founded: 1993
- No. of teams: 74 (total)
- Country: Europe
- Confederation: EHF members
- Most recent champions: (North Macedonia) GRK Ohrid (1st title)
- Most titles: (Romania) CS UCM Reşiţa (3 titles)
- Level on pyramid: 3
- Website: ehfec.eurohandball.com

The EHF European Cup is an annual men's handball club competition organised by the European Handball Federation (EHF). It is the third-tier competition of European club handball, after the EHF Champions League and the EHF European League. Founded in 1993 as the EHF City Cup, the competition was renamed the EHF Challenge Cup in 2000 before adopting its current name in 2020.

== History ==
Before 2000, it was called EHF City Cup. Currently, the EHF coefficient rank decides which teams have access and in which stage they enter.

== Winners ==
=== EHF City Cup ===
Year	Final			Semifinal losers
Year	Champion	Score	Second place	Semifinal losers
1993–94; Details	(Germany); TUSEM Essen	27–17; 31–26	(Sweden); HK Drott	(Spain); BM Granollers	(France); PSG Asnieres Hand-Ball
1994–95; Details	(Germany); TV Niederwürzbach	26–29; 32–26	(Spain); Cadagua Gáldar	(Germany); TUSEM Essen	(Portugal); ABC/UMinho
1995–96; Details	(Norway); Drammen HK	22–21; 27–21	(Germany); SG Hameln	(Hungary); SC Pick Szeged	(Sweden); IFK Skövde HK
1996–97; Details	(Germany); TuS Nettelstedt	32–19; 27–23	(Denmark); KIF Kolding	(Norway); Drammen HK	(Norway); Sandefjord TIF
1997–98; Details	(Germany); TuS Nettelstedt	24–22; 25–23	(Sweden); IFK Skövde HK	(Germany); SG Wallau-Massenheim	(Spain); Academia Octavio Vigo
1998–99; Details	(Germany); SG Flensburg-Handewitt	27–27; 26–21	(Spain); A.D.C. Ciudad Real	(Germany); TuS Nettelstedt	(Norway); Drammen HK
1999–00; Details	(Germany); TV Grosswallstadt	30–23; 27–32	(Spain); BM Valladolid	(Switzerland); Pfadi Winterthur	(Serbia and Montenegro); RK Sintelon

=== EHF Challenge Cup ===
Year	Final			Semifinal losers
Year	Champion	Score	Second place	Semifinal losers
2000–01; Details	(Serbia and Montenegro); RK Jugović Kać	27–27; 26–22	(Switzerland); Pfadi Winterthur	(Italy); SSV Forst Brixen	(Poland); Śląsk Wrocław
2001–02; Details	(Denmark); Skjern Handball	20–27; 34–17	(North Macedonia); RK Pelister	(Denmark); Frederiksberg IF	(France); US Ivry Handball
2002–03; Details	(Denmark); Skjern Handball	27–30; 35–25	(Greece); Filippos Verias	(France); US Créteil Handball	(Sweden); IK Sävehof
2003–04; Details	(Sweden); IFK Skövde HK	20–21; 27–24	(France); US Dunkerque HB	(Romania); HCM Constanța	(Italy); Generali Pallamano Trieste
2004–05; Details	(Switzerland); Wacker Thun	29–24; 26–29	(Portugal); ABC/UMinho	(Austria); HC Superfund Hard	(Switzerland); TSV St. Otmar St. Gallen
2005–06; Details	(Romania); CSA Steaua București	21–26; 34–27	(Portugal); SC Horta	(Croatia); Agram-Medvescak Zagreb	(Switzerland); BSV Bern Muri
2006–07; Details	(Romania); CS UCM Reşiţa	26–26; 36–36	(Norway); Drammen HK	(Poland); Zagłębie Lubin	(Russia); Locomotiv-Polyot Cheljabinsk
2007–08; Details	(Romania); CS UCM Reşiţa	28–29; 26–18	(Austria); Alpla Hard	(Portugal); Benfica	(Switzerland); Pfadi Winterthur
2008–09; Details	(Romania); CS UCM Reşiţa	25–27; 25–20	(Romania); CSU Bucovina Suceava	(Turkey); Beşiktaş JK	(Switzerland); BSV Bern Muri
2009–10; Details	(Portugal); Sporting CP	27–25; 27–26	(Poland); MMTS Kwidzyn	(Slovenia); RD Slovan	(Italy); Bologna United
2010–11; Details	(Slovenia); RK Cimos Koper	27–27; 31–27	(Portugal); Benfica	(Serbia); RK Partizan Dunav Osiguranje	(Romania); Ştiinţa Municipal Dedeman Bacău
2011–12; Details	(Greece); AC Diomidis Argous	26–23; 20–22	(Switzerland); Wacker Thun	(Portugal); Sporting CP	(Israel); Maccabi Tel Aviv
2012–13; Details	(Belarus); SKA Minsk	31–26; 32–24	(Luxembourg); Handball Esch	(Norway); IL Runar	(Romania); CSU Bucovina Suceava
2013–14; Details	(Sweden); IK Sävehof	37–26 ^{^{[A]}}	(Serbia); RK Metaloplastika Šabac	(Poland); KS Azoty-Puławy	(Portugal); Águas Santas
2014–15; Details	(Romania); HC Odorheiu Secuiesc	28–32; 32–25	(Portugal); ABC/UMinho	(Portugal); Benfica	(Norway); Stord
2015–16; Details	(Portugal); ABC/UMinho	28–22; 25–29	(Portugal); Benfica	(Czech Republic); Dukla Prague	(Norway); FyllingenBergen
2016–17; Details	(Portugal); Sporting CP	37–28; 30–24	(Romania); AHC Potaissa Turda	(Netherlands); JMS Hurry-Up	(Iceland); Valur
2017–18; Details	(Romania); AHC Potaissa Turda	33–22; 26–27	(Greece); AEK Athens	(Iceland); IBV Vestmannaeyjar	(Portugal); Madeira Andebol SAD
2018–19; Details	(Romania); CSM București	22–22; 26–20	(Portugal); Madeira Andebol SAD	(Russia); HC Neva SPb	(Greece); AEK Athens
2019–20; Details	Cancelled due to COVID-19 pandemic

=== EHF European Cup ===
Year	Final			Semifinal losers
Year	Champion	Score	Second place	Semifinal losers
2020–21; Details	(Greece); AEK Athens	30–26; 24–20 ^{^{[B]}}	(Sweden); Ystads	(Slovenia); Gorenje Velenje	(Cyprus); Anorthosis Famagusta
2021–22; Details	(Norway); Nærbø	29–25; 27–26	(Romania); Minaur Baia Mare	(Norway); Drammen	(Sweden); Alingsås
2022–23; Details	(Serbia); Vojvodina	30–23; 25–23	(Norway); Nærbø	(Norway); Runar Sandefjord	(Sweden); Alingsås
2023–24; Details	(Iceland); Valur	30–26; 32–35	(Greece); Olympiacos Piraeus	(Hungary); Ferencvárosi	(Romania); Minaur Baia Mare
2024–25; Details	(North Macedonia); Alkaloid	29–25; 10–0	(Greece); AEK	(Bosnia and Herzegovina); Izviđač	(Norway); Runar
2025–26; Details	(North Macedonia); GRK Ohrid	29–28; 31–25	(Hungary); MOL Tatabánya KC	(Slovenia); Celje	(Bosnia and Herzegovina); Izviđač

- ^{A} The first leg was canceled due to the flooding in Serbia, and the final was disputed in only one game.
- ^{B} Both finals held in Chalkida, Greece, due to the COVID-19 pandemic in Sweden.

== Performances ==
=== By teams ===
Team	Won	Years won	Runner-up	Years runner-up
(Romania) UCM Reşiţa	3	2007, 2008, 2009		
(Germany) Nettelstedt	2	1997, 1998		
(Denmark) Skjern	2	2002, 2003		
(Portugal) Sporting CP	2	2010, 2017		
(Greece) AEK Athens	1	2021	2	2018, 2025
(Portugal) ABC/UMinho	1	2016	2	2005, 2015
(Sweden) Skövde	1	2004	1	1998
(Norway) Drammen	1	1996	1	2007
(Switzerland) Wacker Thun	1	2005	1	2012
(Romania) Potaissa Turda	1	2018	1	2017
(Norway) Nærbø	1	2022	1	2023
(North Macedonia) RK Alkaloid	1	2025		
(North Macedonia) GRK Ohrid	1	2026		
(Germany) TUSEM Essen	1	1994		
(Germany) Niederwürzbach	1	1995		
(Germany) Flensburg-Handewitt	1	1999		
(Germany) Großwallstadt	1	2000		
(Serbia and Montenegro) Jugović Kać	1	2001		
(Romania) CSA Steaua București	1	2006		
(Slovenia) Cimos Koper	1	2011		
(Greece) Diomidis Argous	1	2012		
(Belarus) SKA Minsk	1	2013		
(Sweden) Sävehof	1	2014		
(Romania) Odorheiu Secuiesc	1	2015		
(Romania) CSM București	1	2019		
(Serbia) Vojvodina	1	2023		
(Iceland) Valur	1	2024		
(Portugal) S.L. Benfica			2	2011, 2016
(Sweden) Drott			1	1994
(Spain) Cadagua Gáldar			1	1995
(Germany) Hameln			1	1996
(Denmark) Kolding			1	1997
(Spain) Ciudad Real			1	1999
(Spain) BM Valladolid			1	2000
(Switzerland) Pfadi Winterthur			1	2001
(North Macedonia) Eurofarm Pelister			1	2002
(Greece) Filippos Verias			1	2003
(France) US Dunkerque HB			1	2004
(Portugal) SC Horta			1	2006
(Austria) Alpla Hard			1	2008
(Romania) Bucovina Suceava			1	2009
(Poland) Kwidzyn			1	2010
(Luxembourg) Handball Esch			1	2013
(Serbia) RK Metaloplastika Šabac			1	2014
(Portugal) Madeira Andebol			1	2019
(Sweden) Ystads			1	2021
(Romania) Minaur Baia Mare			1	2022
(Greece) Olympiacos Piraeus			1	2024
(Hungary) MOL Tatabánya KC			1	2026

=== By countries ===
Nation	Titles	Runners-up	Finals
Romania	7	3	10
Germany	6	1	7
Portugal	3	6	9
Greece	2	4	6
Sweden	2	3	5
Norway	2	2	4
Denmark	2	1	3
North Macedonia	2	1	3
Serbia	2	1	3
Switzerland	1	2	3
Belarus	1	0	1
Iceland	1	0	1
Slovenia	1	0	1
Spain	0	3	3
Austria	0	1	1
France	0	1	1
Hungary	0	1	1
Luxembourg	0	1	1
Poland	0	1	1

== See also ==
- EHF Champions League
- EHF European League
