= 2015–16 EHF Cup group stage =

The 2015–16 EHF Cup group stage, corresponding to the fourth round of the 2015–16 EHF Cup, will be played from 11 February to 27 March 2016.

== Format ==
Sixteen teams, advancing from the third round, were drawn into four groups of four teams. In each group, teams play each other in a double round-robin system with home-and-away matches. Group winners and runners-up teams will advance to the knockout stage.

== Seedings ==
The seedings were published on 29 November 2015, and the draw took place on 3 December at 11:00 local time, in Vienna, Austria.

Pot 1
(France) Chambéry Savoie Handball
(Belarus) SKA Minsk
(Netherlands) OCI-Lions
(Spain) Fraikin BM. Granollers

Pot 2
(Denmark) Team Tvis Holstebro
(Germany) SC Magdeburg
(Denmark) Bjerringbro-Silkeborg
(Spain) Helvetia Anaitasuna

Pot 3
(France) HBC Nantes
(Romania) Dinamo Bucuresti
(Sweden) Ystads IF
(Switzerland) Pfadi Winterthur

Pot 4
(Germany) Frisch Auf Göppingen
(Denmark) Aalborg Handball
(Romania) CSM Bucuresti
(France) Saint-Raphael

== Group A ==
Pos	Team	Pld	W	D	L	GF	GA	GD	Pts	Qualification
1	(Germany) SC Magdeburg (A)	6	4	0	2	184	162	+22	8	Advance to knockout stage
2	(Spain) Fraikin BM. Granollers (A)	6	3	1	2	172	165	+7	7	Advance to knockout stage
3	(Romania) Dinamo Bucuresti (E)	6	2	1	3	166	181	−15	5	
4	(Denmark) Aalborg Handball (E)	6	1	2	3	147	161	−14	4	

Updated to match(es) played on 27 March 2016. Source:
(A) Advance to a further round; (E) Eliminated

14 February 2016; 12:30	Fraikin BM. Granollers (Spain)	28–29	(Romania) Dinamo Bucuresti	Palau d'Esports de Granollers, Granollers; Attendance: 1,350; Referees: Baumgart, Wild (GER)
14 February 2016; 12:30	Solé 10	(20–13)	Ragot, Sandru 5	Palau d'Esports de Granollers, Granollers; Attendance: 1,350; Referees: Baumgart, Wild (GER)
14 February 2016; 12:30	3× (yellow card) 2× (suspension)	Report	2× (yellow card) 4× (suspension)	Palau d'Esports de Granollers, Granollers; Attendance: 1,350; Referees: Baumgart, Wild (GER)

14 February 2016; 17:00	SC Magdeburg (Germany)	25–19	(Denmark) Aalborg Handball	GETEC Arena, Magdeburg; Attendance: 3,481; Referees: Herczeg, Südi (HUN)
14 February 2016; 17:00	Weber 6	(12–9)	Jensen, Larsen 4	GETEC Arena, Magdeburg; Attendance: 3,481; Referees: Herczeg, Südi (HUN)
14 February 2016; 17:00	3× (yellow card) 3× (suspension)	Report	3× (yellow card) 3× (suspension) 1× (red card)	GETEC Arena, Magdeburg; Attendance: 3,481; Referees: Herczeg, Südi (HUN)

20 February 2016; 15:00	Aalborg Handball (Denmark)	25-31	(Spain) Fraikin BM. Granollers	Gigantium, Aalborg; Attendance: 3915; Referees: Brunner, Salah (SUI)
20 February 2016; 15:00	Jensen 6	(11-15)	Valadão Gama 7	Gigantium, Aalborg; Attendance: 3915; Referees: Brunner, Salah (SUI)
20 February 2016; 15:00	3× (yellow card) 4× (suspension)	Report	3× (yellow card) 3× (suspension)	Gigantium, Aalborg; Attendance: 3915; Referees: Brunner, Salah (SUI)

21 February 2016; 14:00	Dinamo Bucuresti (Romania)	33-34	(Germany) SC Magdeburg	Bucharest; Attendance: 1850; Referees: Gasmi, Gasmi (FRA)
21 February 2016; 14:00	Şandru 9	(18-14)	Weber 9	Bucharest; Attendance: 1850; Referees: Gasmi, Gasmi (FRA)
21 February 2016; 14:00	3× (yellow card) 3× (suspension)	Report	3× (yellow card) 1× (suspension)	Bucharest; Attendance: 1850; Referees: Gasmi, Gasmi (FRA)

27 February 2016; 17:00	SC Magdeburg (Germany)	32-28	(Spain) Fraikin BM. Granollers	GETEC Arena, Magdeburg; Attendance: 3903; Referees: Mitrevski, Todorovski (MKD)
27 February 2016; 17:00	Weber 8	(16-14)	Sole Sala 6	GETEC Arena, Magdeburg; Attendance: 3903; Referees: Mitrevski, Todorovski (MKD)
27 February 2016; 17:00	3× (yellow card) 4× (suspension)	Report	3× (yellow card) 3× (suspension)	GETEC Arena, Magdeburg; Attendance: 3903; Referees: Mitrevski, Todorovski (MKD)

27 February 2016; 13:30	Aalborg Handball (Denmark)	28-28	(Romania) Dinamo Bucuresti	Gigantium, Aalborg; Attendance: 3347; Referees: Kouz, Zhoba (UKR)
27 February 2016; 13:30	Jensen 6	(17-13)	Şandru 5	Gigantium, Aalborg; Attendance: 3347; Referees: Kouz, Zhoba (UKR)
27 February 2016; 13:30	3× (yellow card) 4× (suspension)	Report	2× (yellow card) 5× (suspension)	Gigantium, Aalborg; Attendance: 3347; Referees: Kouz, Zhoba (UKR)

5 March 2016; 15:30	Dinamo Bucuresti (Romania)	28-25	(Denmark) Aalborg Handball	Sports Hall, Buzau; Attendance: 1800; Referees: Acoto Martins, Acoto Martins (POR)
5 March 2016; 15:30	Vrankovic 8	(17-12)	Larsen 6	Sports Hall, Buzau; Attendance: 1800; Referees: Acoto Martins, Acoto Martins (POR)
5 March 2016; 15:30	3× (yellow card) 4× (suspension)	Report	3× (yellow card) 4× (suspension)	Sports Hall, Buzau; Attendance: 1800; Referees: Acoto Martins, Acoto Martins (POR)

6 March 2016; 12:30	Fraikin BM. Granollers (Spain)	34-29	(Germany) SC Magdeburg	Palau d'Esports de Granollers, Granollers; Attendance: 1200; Referees: Kutargic, Wetterwik (SWE)
6 March 2016; 12:30	Figueras Trejo 10	(15-13)	Damgaard Nielsen 8	Palau d'Esports de Granollers, Granollers; Attendance: 1200; Referees: Kutargic, Wetterwik (SWE)
6 March 2016; 12:30	2× (yellow card) 4× (suspension)	Report	3× (yellow card) 2× (suspension)	Palau d'Esports de Granollers, Granollers; Attendance: 1200; Referees: Kutargic, Wetterwik (SWE)

19 March 2016; 18:30	Aalborg Handball (Denmark)	26-25	(Germany) SC Magdeburg	Gigantium, Aalborg; Attendance: 3741; Referees: Leandersson, Lindroos (FIN)
19 March 2016; 18:30	Slundt 7	(15-11)	Weber 7	Gigantium, Aalborg; Attendance: 3741; Referees: Leandersson, Lindroos (FIN)
19 March 2016; 18:30	3× (yellow card) 4× (suspension)	Report	3× (yellow card) 3× (suspension)	Gigantium, Aalborg; Attendance: 3741; Referees: Leandersson, Lindroos (FIN)

20 March 2016; 13:30	Dinamo Bucuresti (Romania)	26-27	(Spain) Fraikin BM. Granollers	Polyvalent Hall, Bucharest; Attendance: 2000; Referees: Herczeg, Südi (HUN)
20 March 2016; 13:30	Vranković 9	(14-15)	Figueras Trejo 7	Polyvalent Hall, Bucharest; Attendance: 2000; Referees: Herczeg, Südi (HUN)
20 March 2016; 13:30	3× (yellow card) 2× (suspension)	Report	3× (yellow card) 2× (suspension)	Polyvalent Hall, Bucharest; Attendance: 2000; Referees: Herczeg, Südi (HUN)

27 March 2016; 20:30	Fraikin BM. Granollers (Spain)	24-24	(Denmark) Aalborg Handball	Palau d'Esports de Granollers, Granollers; Attendance: 2300; Referees: Mykolaitis, Sniurevicius (LTU)
27 March 2016; 20:30	Sole Sala 10	(13-10)	Sagosen 7	Palau d'Esports de Granollers, Granollers; Attendance: 2300; Referees: Mykolaitis, Sniurevicius (LTU)
27 March 2016; 20:30	2× (yellow card) 2× (suspension)	Report	3× (yellow card) 5× (suspension)	Palau d'Esports de Granollers, Granollers; Attendance: 2300; Referees: Mykolaitis, Sniurevicius (LTU)

27 March 2016; 17:00	SC Magdeburg (Germany)	39-22	(Romania) Dinamo Bucuresti	GETEC Arena, Magdeburg; Attendance: 4,260; Referees: Brunner, Salah (SUI)
27 March 2016; 17:00	D. Nielsen, Weber 8	(17-9)	Ghalehmirz, Vrankovic 5	GETEC Arena, Magdeburg; Attendance: 4,260; Referees: Brunner, Salah (SUI)
27 March 2016; 17:00	3× (yellow card) 1× (suspension)	Report	2× (yellow card) 3× (suspension)	GETEC Arena, Magdeburg; Attendance: 4,260; Referees: Brunner, Salah (SUI)

== Group B ==
Pos	Team	Pld	W	D	L	GF	GA	GD	Pts	Qualification
1	(France) HBC Nantes (A)	6	5	0	1	176	151	+25	10	Advance to knockout stage
2	(Germany) Frisch Auf Göppingen (A)	6	4	0	2	198	161	+37	8	Advance to knockout stage
3	(Denmark) Team Tvis Holstebro (E)	6	3	0	3	167	180	−13	6	
4	(Netherlands) OCI-Lions (E)	6	0	0	6	154	203	−49	0	

Updated to match(es) played on 27 March 2016. Source:
Rules for classification: Group stage tiebreakers
(A) Advance to a further round; (E) Eliminated

10 February 2016; 20:45	Team Tvis Holstebro (Denmark)	34–31	(Germany) Frisch Auf Göppingen	Gråkjær Arena, Holstebro; Attendance: 1,057; Referees: Kouz, Zhouba (UKR)
10 February 2016; 20:45	Larsen 10	(17–17)	Schiller 7	Gråkjær Arena, Holstebro; Attendance: 1,057; Referees: Kouz, Zhouba (UKR)
10 February 2016; 20:45	2× (yellow card) 6× (suspension)	Report	2× (yellow card) 3× (suspension)	Gråkjær Arena, Holstebro; Attendance: 1,057; Referees: Kouz, Zhouba (UKR)

13 February 2016; 19:30	OCI-Lions (Netherlands)	26–33	(France) HBC Nantes	Topsporthal Fitland XL, Sittard; Attendance: 2,034; Referees: Olesen, Pedersen (DEN)
13 February 2016; 19:30	Three Players 4	(12–16)	Claire	Topsporthal Fitland XL, Sittard; Attendance: 2,034; Referees: Olesen, Pedersen (DEN)
13 February 2016; 19:30	3× (yellow card) 9× (suspension) 1× (red card)	Report	3× (yellow card) 3× (suspension)	Topsporthal Fitland XL, Sittard; Attendance: 2,034; Referees: Olesen, Pedersen (DEN)

21 February 2016; 17:30	Frisch Auf Göppingen (Germany)	40-20	(Netherlands) OCI-Lions	EWS Arena, Göppingen; Attendance: 2650; Referees: Cacador, Nicolau (POR)
21 February 2016; 17:30	Schiller 9	(22-10)	Smits 4	EWS Arena, Göppingen; Attendance: 2650; Referees: Cacador, Nicolau (POR)
21 February 2016; 17:30	3× (yellow card) 2× (suspension)	Report	3× (yellow card) 4× (suspension)	EWS Arena, Göppingen; Attendance: 2650; Referees: Cacador, Nicolau (POR)

21 February 2016; 19:00	HBC Nantes (France)	32-23	(Denmark) Team Tvis Holstebro	Salle Sportive de la Trocardiere, Rezé; Attendance: 4000; Referees: Baranowski, Lemanowicz (POL)
21 February 2016; 19:00	Rivera Folch 7	(17-9)	Wiesmach 7	Salle Sportive de la Trocardiere, Rezé; Attendance: 4000; Referees: Baranowski, Lemanowicz (POL)
21 February 2016; 19:00	3× (yellow card) 3× (suspension)	Report	3× (yellow card) 6× (suspension)	Salle Sportive de la Trocardiere, Rezé; Attendance: 4000; Referees: Baranowski, Lemanowicz (POL)

27 February 2016; 19:30	Frisch Auf Göppingen (Germany)	27-26	(France) HBC Nantes	EWS Arena, Göppingen; Attendance: 3150; Referees: Sager, Styger (SUI)
27 February 2016; 19:30	Fontaine 7	(14-13)	Entrerríos 7	EWS Arena, Göppingen; Attendance: 3150; Referees: Sager, Styger (SUI)
27 February 2016; 19:30	3× (yellow card) 2× (suspension)	Report	3× (yellow card) 4× (suspension)	EWS Arena, Göppingen; Attendance: 3150; Referees: Sager, Styger (SUI)

28 February 2016; 13:00	Tvis Holstebro (Denmark)	29-24	(Netherlands) OCI-Lions	Gråkjær Arena, Holstebro; Attendance: 1188; Referees: Manea, Iliescu (ROU)
28 February 2016; 13:00	Bramming 8	(17-13)	Ramos, Vernooy 5	Gråkjær Arena, Holstebro; Attendance: 1188; Referees: Manea, Iliescu (ROU)
28 February 2016; 13:00	3× (yellow card) 2× (suspension)	Report	3× (yellow card) 2× (suspension)	Gråkjær Arena, Holstebro; Attendance: 1188; Referees: Manea, Iliescu (ROU)

5 March 2016; 19:30	OCI-Lions (Netherlands)	29-31	(Denmark) Team Tvis Holstebro	Topsporthal Fitland XL, Sittard; Attendance: 2037; Referees: Vitaku, Vitaku (KOS)
5 March 2016; 19:30	Vossen 7	(11-12)	Balling 10	Topsporthal Fitland XL, Sittard; Attendance: 2037; Referees: Vitaku, Vitaku (KOS)
5 March 2016; 19:30	3× (yellow card) 4× (suspension)	Report	3× (yellow card) 1× (suspension)	Topsporthal Fitland XL, Sittard; Attendance: 2037; Referees: Vitaku, Vitaku (KOS)

6 March 2016; 19:00	HBC Nantes (France)	27-24	(Germany) Frisch Auf Göppingen	Salle Sportive de la Trocardière, Rezé; Attendance: 4421; Referees: Alvarez Mata, Bustamante Lopez (ESP)
6 March 2016; 19:00	Entrerríos, Rivera Folch 6	(13-10)	Schiller 6	Salle Sportive de la Trocardière, Rezé; Attendance: 4421; Referees: Alvarez Mata, Bustamante Lopez (ESP)
6 March 2016; 19:00	3× (yellow card) 3× (suspension)	Report	3× (yellow card) 3× (suspension)	Salle Sportive de la Trocardière, Rezé; Attendance: 4421; Referees: Alvarez Mata, Bustamante Lopez (ESP)

19 March 2016; 19:30	Frisch Auf Göppingen (Germany)	36-23	(Denmark) Team Tvis Holstebro	EWS Arena, Göppingen; Attendance: 3250; Referees: Kiyashko, Kiselev (RUS)
19 March 2016; 19:30	Pfahl 8	(16-12)	Balling 7	EWS Arena, Göppingen; Attendance: 3250; Referees: Kiyashko, Kiselev (RUS)
19 March 2016; 19:30	3× (yellow card) 1× (suspension)	Report	2× (yellow card) 3× (suspension)	EWS Arena, Göppingen; Attendance: 3250; Referees: Kiyashko, Kiselev (RUS)

20 March 2016; 19:00	HBC Nantes (France)	30-24	(Netherlands) OCI-Lions	Salle Sportive de la Trocardière, Rezé; Attendance: 4152; Referees: Jorum, Kleven (NOR)
20 March 2016; 19:00	Balaguer Romeu 10	(14-14)	Ramos 6	Salle Sportive de la Trocardière, Rezé; Attendance: 4152; Referees: Jorum, Kleven (NOR)
20 March 2016; 19:00	2× (yellow card) 3× (suspension)	Report	2× (yellow card) 6× (suspension)	Salle Sportive de la Trocardière, Rezé; Attendance: 4152; Referees: Jorum, Kleven (NOR)

26 March 2016; 19:30	OCI-Lions (Netherlands)	31-40	(Germany) Frisch Auf Göppingen	Topsporthal Fitland XL, Sittard; Attendance: 2143; Referees: Panayides, Andreou (CYP)
26 March 2016; 19:30	Ramos 12	(15-19)	Berg 10	Topsporthal Fitland XL, Sittard; Attendance: 2143; Referees: Panayides, Andreou (CYP)
26 March 2016; 19:30	3× (yellow card) 5× (suspension)	Report	3× (yellow card) 3× (suspension)	Topsporthal Fitland XL, Sittard; Attendance: 2143; Referees: Panayides, Andreou (CYP)

27 March 2016; 15:00	Tvis Holstebro (Denmark)	27-28	(France) HBC Nantes	Gråkjær Arena, Holstebro; Attendance: 918; Referees: Erdogan, Özdeniz (TUR)
27 March 2016; 15:00	Magnússon 8	(10-13)	Komogorov 9	Gråkjær Arena, Holstebro; Attendance: 918; Referees: Erdogan, Özdeniz (TUR)
27 March 2016; 15:00	3× (yellow card) 2× (suspension)	Report	3× (yellow card) 3× (suspension)	Gråkjær Arena, Holstebro; Attendance: 918; Referees: Erdogan, Özdeniz (TUR)

== Group C ==
Pos	Team	Pld	W	D	L	GF	GA	GD	Pts	Qualification
1	(Denmark) Bjerringbro-Silkeborg (A)	6	4	1	1	168	155	+13	9	Advance to knockout stage
2	(France) Saint-Raphael Var Handball (A)	6	3	1	2	165	165	0	7	Advance to knockout stage
3	(Switzerland) Pfadi Winterthur (E)	6	1	2	3	160	162	−2	4	
4	(Belarus) SKA Minsk (E)	6	2	0	4	169	180	−11	4	

Updated to match(es) played on 27 March 2016. Source:
Rules for classification: Group stage tiebreakers
(A) Advance to a further round; (E) Eliminated

13 February 2016; 19:00	SKA Minsk (Belarus)	31–27	(Switzerland) Pfadi Winterthur	Minsk Sports Palace, Minsk; Attendance: 2,350; Referees: Stark, Stefan (ROU)
13 February 2016; 19:00	Kulesh 9	(17–13)	Hess, Sidorowiz 7	Minsk Sports Palace, Minsk; Attendance: 2,350; Referees: Stark, Stefan (ROU)
13 February 2016; 19:00	3× (yellow card) 2× (suspension)	Report	3× (yellow card) 3× (suspension)	Minsk Sports Palace, Minsk; Attendance: 2,350; Referees: Stark, Stefan (ROU)

14 February 2016; 18:00	Bjerringbro-Silkeborg (Denmark)	31–26	(France) Saint-Raphael	Silkeborg-Hallerne, Silkeborg; Attendance: 1,745; Referees: Cvetko, Kavalar (SLO)
14 February 2016; 18:00	Christiansen 7	(15–12)	Caucheteux 7	Silkeborg-Hallerne, Silkeborg; Attendance: 1,745; Referees: Cvetko, Kavalar (SLO)
14 February 2016; 18:00	3× (yellow card) 1× (suspension)	Report	3× (yellow card) 3× (suspension)	Silkeborg-Hallerne, Silkeborg; Attendance: 1,745; Referees: Cvetko, Kavalar (SLO)

20 February 2016; 20:00	Saint-Raphael (France)	31-29	(Belarus) SKA Minsk	Palais des sports Jean-François-Krakowski, Saint-Raphaël, Var; Attendance: 1000; Referees: Nikolic, Stojkovic (SRB)
20 February 2016; 20:00	Caucheteux 7	(17-16)	Kulesh, Padshyvalau 5	Palais des sports Jean-François-Krakowski, Saint-Raphaël, Var; Attendance: 1000; Referees: Nikolic, Stojkovic (SRB)
20 February 2016; 20:00	3× (yellow card) 3× (suspension)	Report	3× (yellow card) 7× (suspension) 1× (red card)	Palais des sports Jean-François-Krakowski, Saint-Raphaël, Var; Attendance: 1000; Referees: Nikolic, Stojkovic (SRB)

21 February 2016; 16:00	Pfadi Winterthur (Switzerland)	25-28	(Denmark) Bjerringbro-Silkeborg	Eulachhalle, Winterthur; Attendance: 1100; Referees: Katsikis, Michailidis (GRE)
21 February 2016; 16:00	Sidorowiz 8	(13-14)	Christiansen 5	Eulachhalle, Winterthur; Attendance: 1100; Referees: Katsikis, Michailidis (GRE)
21 February 2016; 16:00	2× (yellow card) 4× (suspension)	Report	2× (yellow card)	Eulachhalle, Winterthur; Attendance: 1100; Referees: Katsikis, Michailidis (GRE)

27 February 2015; 18:30	Bjerringbro-Silkeborg (Denmark)	32-26	(Belarus) SKA Minsk	Silkeborg-Hallerne, Silkeborg; Attendance: 1915; Referees: Schulze, Tönnies (GER)
27 February 2015; 18:30	Hundstrup 7	(15-14)	Bachko, Kulesh 6	Silkeborg-Hallerne, Silkeborg; Attendance: 1915; Referees: Schulze, Tönnies (GER)
27 February 2015; 18:30	3× (yellow card) 7× (suspension)	Report	3× (yellow card) 7× (suspension)	Silkeborg-Hallerne, Silkeborg; Attendance: 1915; Referees: Schulze, Tönnies (GER)

27 February 2016; 20:00	Saint-Raphael (France)	28-28	(Switzerland) Pfadi Winterthur	Palais des sports Jean-François-Krakowski, Saint-Raphaël, Var; Attendance: 1430; Referees: Andorka, Hucker (HUN)
27 February 2016; 20:00	Abily 7	(16-7)	Hess 8	Palais des sports Jean-François-Krakowski, Saint-Raphaël, Var; Attendance: 1430; Referees: Andorka, Hucker (HUN)
27 February 2016; 20:00	2× (yellow card) 4× (suspension)	Report	3× (yellow card) 2× (suspension)	Palais des sports Jean-François-Krakowski, Saint-Raphaël, Var; Attendance: 1430; Referees: Andorka, Hucker (HUN)

6 March 2016; 16:00	Pfadi Winterthur (Switzerland)	21-24	(France) Saint-Raphael	Eulachhalle, Winterthur; Attendance: 1650; Referees: Leandersson, Lindroos (FIN)
6 March 2016; 16:00	Vernier 6	(8-11)	Dipanda 9	Eulachhalle, Winterthur; Attendance: 1650; Referees: Leandersson, Lindroos (FIN)
6 March 2016; 16:00	3× (yellow card) 3× (suspension)	Report	2× (yellow card) 7× (suspension)	Eulachhalle, Winterthur; Attendance: 1650; Referees: Leandersson, Lindroos (FIN)

6 March 2016; 19:00	SKA Minsk (Belarus)	28-25	(Denmark) Bjerringbro-Silkeborg	Minsk Sports Palace, Minsk; Attendance: 2000; Referees: Cindric, Gonzurek (CRO)
6 March 2016; 19:00	Patsykailik 8	(13-13)	Markussen 7	Minsk Sports Palace, Minsk; Attendance: 2000; Referees: Cindric, Gonzurek (CRO)
6 March 2016; 19:00	3× (yellow card) 2× (suspension)	Report	3× (yellow card) 6× (suspension)	Minsk Sports Palace, Minsk; Attendance: 2000; Referees: Cindric, Gonzurek (CRO)

19 March 2016; 20:00	Saint-Raphael (France)	23-25	(Denmark) Bjerringbro-Silkeborg	Palais des sports Jean-François-Krakowski, Saint-Raphaël, Var; Attendance: 1000; Referees: Harabagiu, Stanescu (ROU)
19 March 2016; 20:00	Caucheteux 7	(15-12)	Christiansen 8	Palais des sports Jean-François-Krakowski, Saint-Raphaël, Var; Attendance: 1000; Referees: Harabagiu, Stanescu (ROU)
19 March 2016; 20:00	3× (yellow card) 3× (suspension)	Report	3× (yellow card) 3× (suspension)	Palais des sports Jean-François-Krakowski, Saint-Raphaël, Var; Attendance: 1000; Referees: Harabagiu, Stanescu (ROU)

20 March 2016; 16:00	Pfadi Winterthur (Switzerland)	32-24	(Belarus) SKA Minsk	Eulachhalle, Winterthur; Attendance: 1030; Referees: Kouz, Zhoba (UKR)
20 March 2016; 16:00	Gavranovic 9	(16-11)	Kulesh 10	Eulachhalle, Winterthur; Attendance: 1030; Referees: Kouz, Zhoba (UKR)
20 March 2016; 16:00	3× (yellow card) 5× (suspension)	Report	2× (yellow card) 5× (suspension)	Eulachhalle, Winterthur; Attendance: 1030; Referees: Kouz, Zhoba (UKR)

27 March 2016; 19:00	SKA Minsk (Belarus)	31-33	(France) Saint-Raphael	Minsk Sports Palace, Minsk; Attendance: 2300; Referees: Pandzic, Satordzija (BIH)
27 March 2016; 19:00	Brouka, Kulesh 8	(17-17)	Lynggaard 9	Minsk Sports Palace, Minsk; Attendance: 2300; Referees: Pandzic, Satordzija (BIH)
27 March 2016; 19:00	3× (yellow card) 5× (suspension)	Report	3× (yellow card) 5× (suspension)	Minsk Sports Palace, Minsk; Attendance: 2300; Referees: Pandzic, Satordzija (BIH)

27 March 2016; 17:00	Bjerringbro-Silkeborg (Denmark)	27-27	(Switzerland) Pfadi Winterthur	Silkeborg-Hallerne, Silkeborg; Attendance: 1690; Referees: Cacador, Nicolau (POR)
27 March 2016; 17:00	Espersen 6	(15-15)	Lier, Vernier 5	Silkeborg-Hallerne, Silkeborg; Attendance: 1690; Referees: Cacador, Nicolau (POR)
27 March 2016; 17:00	3× (yellow card) 4× (suspension)	Report	2× (yellow card) 3× (suspension)	Silkeborg-Hallerne, Silkeborg; Attendance: 1690; Referees: Cacador, Nicolau (POR)

== Group D ==
Pos	Team	Pld	W	D	L	GF	GA	GD	Pts	Qualification
1	(France) Chambery Savoie Handball (A)	6	4	2	0	161	141	+20	10	Advance to knockout stage
2	(Sweden) Ystads IF (E)	6	3	1	2	159	167	−8	7	
3	(Romania) CSM Bucuresti (E)	6	1	3	2	152	156	−4	5	
4	(Spain) Helvetia Anaitasuna (E)	6	1	0	5	150	158	−8	2	

Updated to match(es) played on 27 March 2016. Source:
Rules for classification: Group stage tiebreakers
(A) Advance to a further round; (E) Eliminated

11 February 2016; 18:45	Chambéry Savoie Handball (France)	32–22	(Sweden) Ystads IF	Le Phare, Chambéry; Attendance: 3,500; Referees: Konjicanin, Konjicanin (BIH)
11 February 2016; 18:45	Traore 8	(16–11)	Hallbäck 7	Le Phare, Chambéry; Attendance: 3,500; Referees: Konjicanin, Konjicanin (BIH)
11 February 2016; 18:45	3× (yellow card) 2× (suspension)	Report	3× (yellow card) 4× (suspension)	Le Phare, Chambéry; Attendance: 3,500; Referees: Konjicanin, Konjicanin (BIH)

13 February 2016; 20:00	Helvetia Anaitasuna (Spain)	28–22	(Romania) CSM Bucuresti	Pabellón Anaitasuna, Pamplona; Attendance: 1,500; Referees: Zotin, Volodkov (RUS)
13 February 2016; 20:00	Alvarez 6	(14–13)	Humet, Negru 6	Pabellón Anaitasuna, Pamplona; Attendance: 1,500; Referees: Zotin, Volodkov (RUS)
13 February 2016; 20:00	3× (yellow card) 1× (suspension)	Report	3× (yellow card) 4× (suspension)	Pabellón Anaitasuna, Pamplona; Attendance: 1,500; Referees: Zotin, Volodkov (RUS)

20 February 2016; 13:30	Ystads IF (Sweden)	32-31	(Spain) Helvetia Anaitasuna	Österporthallen, Ystad; Attendance: 759; Referees: Schulze, Tönnies (GER)
20 February 2016; 13:30	Andersson 9	(13-17)	Costoya Rodríguez 8	Österporthallen, Ystad; Attendance: 759; Referees: Schulze, Tönnies (GER)
20 February 2016; 13:30	3× (yellow card) 7× (suspension)	Report	3× (yellow card) 1× (suspension) 1× (red card)	Österporthallen, Ystad; Attendance: 759; Referees: Schulze, Tönnies (GER)

20 February 2016; 15:30	CSM Bucuresti (Romania)	25-25	(France) Chambéry Savoie Handball	Polyvalent Hall, Bucharest; Attendance: 2020; Referees: Boricic, Markovic (SRB)
20 February 2016; 15:30	Humet Gaminde, Marijanac 8	(12-12)	Bicanic 9	Polyvalent Hall, Bucharest; Attendance: 2020; Referees: Boricic, Markovic (SRB)
20 February 2016; 15:30	3× (yellow card) 4× (suspension)	Report	3× (yellow card) 5× (suspension)	Polyvalent Hall, Bucharest; Attendance: 2020; Referees: Boricic, Markovic (SRB)

27 February 2016; 14:00	CSM Bucuresti (Romania)	27-27	(Sweden) Ystads IF	Polyvalent Hall, Bucharest; Attendance: 2015; Referees: Nabokau, Kulik (BLR)
27 February 2016; 14:00	Humet Gaminde 9	(13-11)	Andersson 9	Polyvalent Hall, Bucharest; Attendance: 2015; Referees: Nabokau, Kulik (BLR)
27 February 2016; 14:00	3× (yellow card) 3× (suspension)	Report	2× (yellow card) 4× (suspension)	Polyvalent Hall, Bucharest; Attendance: 2015; Referees: Nabokau, Kulik (BLR)

27 February 2016; 20:00	Helvetia Anaitasuna (Spain)	22-28	(France) Chambéry Savoie Handball	Pabellón Anaitasuna, Pamplona; Attendance: 1500; Referees: Stenrand, Birch (DEN)
27 February 2016; 20:00	Inestrosa 5	(12-14)	N'Guessan 6	Pabellón Anaitasuna, Pamplona; Attendance: 1500; Referees: Stenrand, Birch (DEN)
27 February 2016; 20:00	3× (yellow card) 3× (suspension)	Report	3× (yellow card)	Pabellón Anaitasuna, Pamplona; Attendance: 1500; Referees: Stenrand, Birch (DEN)

5 March 2016; 13:30	Ystads IF (Sweden)	29-28	(Romania) CSM Bucuresti	Österporthallen, Ystad; Attendance: 820; Referees: Vesovic, Mitrovic (MNE)
5 March 2016; 13:30	Nilsson 8	(14-14)	Humet Gaminde 11	Österporthallen, Ystad; Attendance: 820; Referees: Vesovic, Mitrovic (MNE)
5 March 2016; 13:30	2× (yellow card) 2× (suspension)	Report	3× (yellow card) 2× (suspension)	Österporthallen, Ystad; Attendance: 820; Referees: Vesovic, Mitrovic (MNE)

5 March 2016; 19:30	Chambéry Savoie Handball (France)	26-23	(Spain) Helvetia Anaitasuna	Le Phare, Chambéry; Attendance: 3200; Referees: Cvetko, Kavalar (SLO)
5 March 2016; 19:30	Panić 6	(10-9)	Inestrosa, Rodríguez 6	Le Phare, Chambéry; Attendance: 3200; Referees: Cvetko, Kavalar (SLO)
5 March 2016; 19:30	3× (yellow card) 4× (suspension)	Report	3× (yellow card) 1× (suspension)	Le Phare, Chambéry; Attendance: 3200; Referees: Cvetko, Kavalar (SLO)

19 March 2016; 13:30	Ystads IF (Sweden)	26-27	(France) Chambéry Savoie Handball	Österporthallen, Ystad; Attendance: 728; Referees: Cindric, Gonzurek (CRO)
19 March 2016; 13:30	Nilsson 7	(14-13)	Bicanic 6	Österporthallen, Ystad; Attendance: 728; Referees: Cindric, Gonzurek (CRO)
19 March 2016; 13:30	3× (yellow card) 1× (suspension)	Report	2× (yellow card) 1× (suspension)	Österporthallen, Ystad; Attendance: 728; Referees: Cindric, Gonzurek (CRO)

19 March 2016; 15:30	CSM Bucuresti (Romania)	27-24	(Spain) Helvetia Anaitasuna	Polyvalent Hall, Bucharest; Attendance: 1200; Referees: Konjicanin, Konjicanin (BIH)
19 March 2016; 15:30	Negru 7	(16-11)	Castro Alvarez 7	Polyvalent Hall, Bucharest; Attendance: 1200; Referees: Konjicanin, Konjicanin (BIH)
19 March 2016; 15:30	3× (yellow card) 2× (suspension)	Report	3× (yellow card) 3× (suspension)	Polyvalent Hall, Bucharest; Attendance: 1200; Referees: Konjicanin, Konjicanin (BIH)

26 March 2016; 20:00	Helvetia Anaitasuna (Spain)	22-23	(Sweden) Ystads IF	Pabellón Anaitasuna, Pamplona; Attendance: 1900; Referees: Baranowski, Lemanowicz (POL)
26 March 2016; 20:00	Rodríguez, Castro Alvarez 5	(12-8)	H.Andersson 5	Pabellón Anaitasuna, Pamplona; Attendance: 1900; Referees: Baranowski, Lemanowicz (POL)
26 March 2016; 20:00	3× (yellow card) 5× (suspension)	Report	2× (yellow card) 4× (suspension) 1× (red card)	Pabellón Anaitasuna, Pamplona; Attendance: 1900; Referees: Baranowski, Lemanowicz (POL)

27 March 2016; 17:00	Chambéry Savoie Handball (France)	23-23	(Romania) CSM Bucuresti	Le Phare, Chambéry; Attendance: 3249; Referees: Bonifert, Oláh (HUN)
27 March 2016; 17:00	Bicanic 6	(12-11)	Humet Gaminde 9	Le Phare, Chambéry; Attendance: 3249; Referees: Bonifert, Oláh (HUN)
27 March 2016; 17:00	2× (yellow card) 4× (suspension)	Report	1× (yellow card) 7× (suspension)	Le Phare, Chambéry; Attendance: 3249; Referees: Bonifert, Oláh (HUN)
