= Bega Veche =

Bega Veche Beregsău, Стари Бегеј
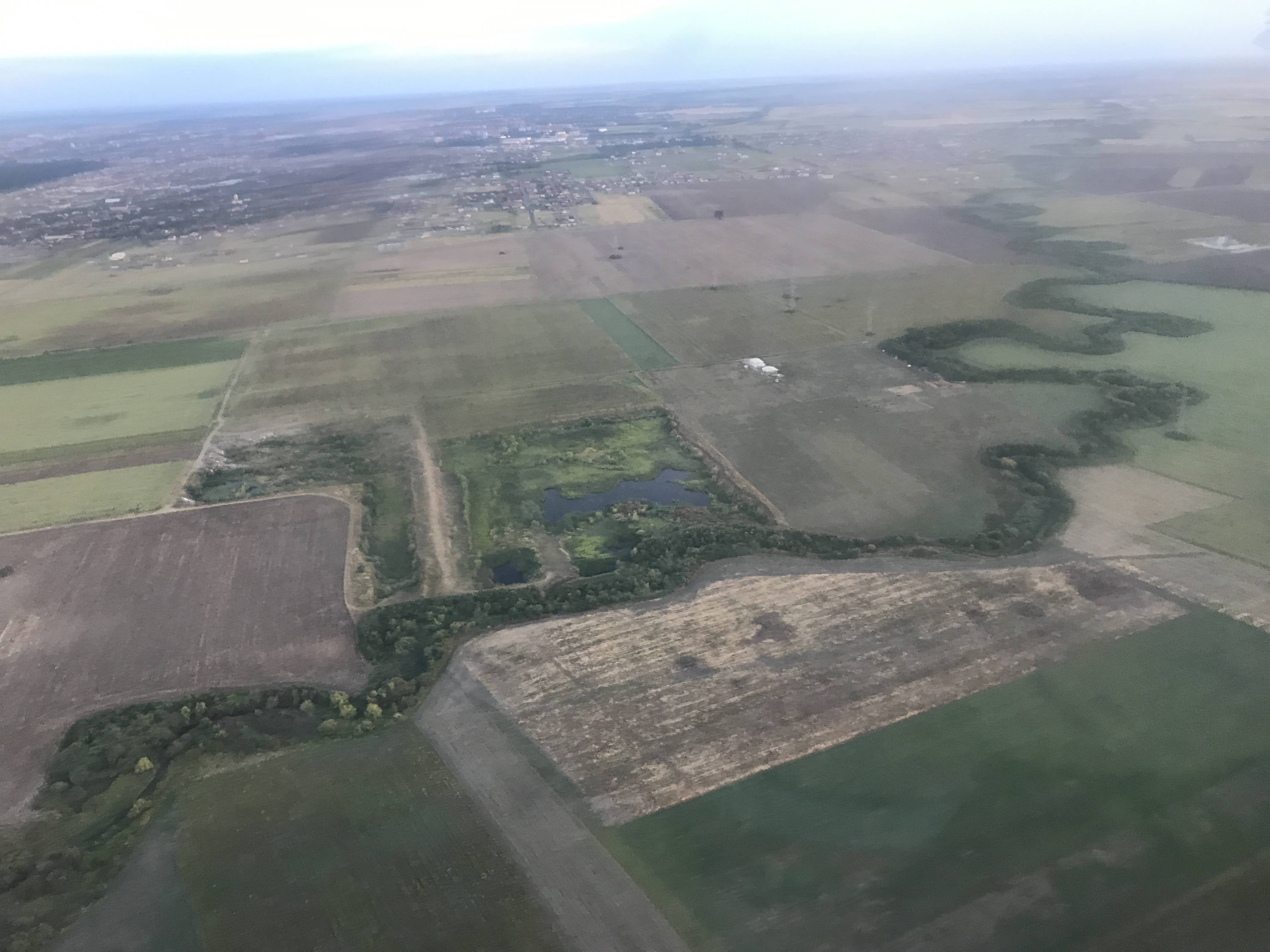
- Bega Veche near Dumbrăvița north of Timișoara

- Location within Serbia Location within Romania

Location
- Country: Romania, Serbia
- Counties: Timiș County, Vojvodina Province
- Communes: Bogda, Mașloc, Fibiș, Pișchia, Giarmata, Sânandrei, Săcălaz, Cenei, Žitište, Zrenjanin

Physical characteristics
- Mouth: Bega
  - location: Zrenjanin
  - coordinates: 45.4368°N 20.4560°E

Basin features
- Progression: Bega→ Tisza→ Danube→ Black Sea
- Tributaries
  - left: Băcin
  - right: Măgheruș, Apa Mare

The Bega Veche (also: Beregsău, Serbian: Стари Бегеј – Stari Begej) is a left tributary of the river Bega in Romania and Serbia. It discharges into the canalized part of the Bega near Zrenjanin. In Romania, its length is 107 km (66 mi) and its basin size is 2,108 km^{2} (814 sq mi). The lower part of the river is the old course of the Bega. It drains the area north of the city of Timișoara. It flows through the villages Comeat, Bogda, Charlotenburg, Remetea Mică, Fibiș, Pișchia, Cerneteaz, Covaci, Sânandrei, Săcălaz, Beregsău Mare, Beregsău Mic, Bobda and Cenei in Romania, and through Hetin and Banatski Dvor in Serbia. Many rivers of the Banat plain have been channelized. The channelization started in the 18th century and has continued in the following centuries. At present most of these rivers have been integrated into the system of drainage channels of the area. This development has significantly modified the original natural river network.

== Tributaries ==
The following rivers are tributaries to the river Bega Veche (in downstream order):

- Left: Buzad, Hamoș, Honoș, Șumanda, Băcin, Valea Dosului
- Right: Sintar, Măgheruș, Pârâul Lacului, Apa Mare
