= 2015–16 EHF Cup =

European handball competition

EHF Cup
- 2015–16

Tournament information
- Sport: Handball
- Dates: 5 September 2015–15 May 2016
- Teams: 69 (qualification stage); 16 (group stage)

Final positions
- Champions: (Germany) Frisch Auf Göppingen
- Runner-up: (France) HBC Nantes

Tournament statistics
- Top scorer(s): (Spain) Ferran Solé (70 goals)

The 2015–16 EHF Cup was the 35th edition of the EHF Cup, the second most important European handball club competition organised by the European Handball Federation (EHF), and the fourth edition since the merger with the EHF Cup Winners' Cup.

== Qualification stage ==
The qualification stage consisted of three rounds, which were played as two-legged ties using a home-and-away system. In the draws for each round, teams were allocated into two pots, with teams from Pot 1 facing teams from Pot 2. The winners of each pairing (highlighted in bold) qualified for the following round.

For each round, teams listed first played the first leg at home. In some cases, teams agreed to play both matches at the same venue.

=== Round 1 ===
A total of 24 teams entered the draw for the first qualification round, which was held on Tuesday, 22 July 2015. The first legs were played on 6–7 September and the second legs were played on 13–14 September 2015.

Team 1	Agg.	Team 2	1st leg	2nd leg
**Dinamo București** (Romania)	62–48	(Romania) Energia Lignitul Pandurii Târgu Jiu	38–24	24–24
**Hubo Initia Hasselt** (Belgium)	70–45^{a}	(Turkey) Merzifon Belediye Hentbol SK	37–21	33–24
**RK Poreč** (Croatia)	46–42^{b}	(Israel) Maccabi Rishon Lezion	20–18	26–24
HC Fregata-Burgas (Bulgaria)	38–54	(Kosovo) **KH BESA Famiglia**	18–24	20–30
**GRK Varaždin 1930** (Croatia)	47–36	(Italy) A.S.D. Romagna Handball	26–16	21–20
PGU-Kartina TV Tiraspol (Moldova)	50–76^{c}	(Poland) **NMC Górnik Zabrze**	25–40	25–36
**Põlva Serviti** (Estonia)	53–49	(Lithuania) Dragūnas Klaipėda	29–26	24–23
**Ystad IF HF** (Sweden)	76–48	(Luxembourg) Handball Käerjeng	41–28	35–20
HB Dudelange (Luxembourg)	50–68^{d}	(Norway) **Haslum Handballklubb**	27–34	23–34
**KRAS/Volendam** (Netherlands)	64–41^{e}	(Montenegro) HC Lovćen	34–23	30–18
**TSV St. Otmar St. Gallen** (Switzerland)	67–55	(Finland) Riihimäki Cocks	34–24	33–21
SSV Bozen Loacker (Italy)	50–50^{f} (a)	(Iceland) **Haukar**	30–24	20–26

Notes

^{a} Both legs were hosted by Hubo Initia Hasselt.
^{b} Both legs were hosted by RK Poreč.
^{c} Both legs were hosted by NMC Górnik Zabrze.
^{d} Both legs were hosted by Haslum Handballklubb.

^{e} Both legs were hosted by KRAS/Volendam.
^{f} Both legs were hosted by SSV Bozen Loacker.

=== Round 2 ===
A total of 32 teams entered the draw for the second qualification round, which was held on Tuesday, 22 July 2015. Among these teams were 12 winners of the previous round.

Team 1	Agg.	Team 2	1st leg	2nd leg
AC Diomidis Argous (Greece)	41–61^{a}	(Romania) **Dinamo București**	21–26	20–35
**Csurgói KK** (Hungary)	59–46	(Poland) Pogoń Szczecin	29–19	30–27
**ØIF Arendal** (Norway)	65–43^{b}	(Kosovo) KH BESA Famiglia	34–18	31–25
**Talent M.A.T. Plzeň** (Czech Republic)	54–49	(Croatia) RK Poreč	27–24	27–25
**Pfadi Winterthur** (Switzerland)	52–44	(Estonia) Põlva Serviti	31–24	21–20
**Hubo Initia Hasselt** (Belgium)	48–43	(Serbia) RK Spartak Vojput	27–20	21–23
Permskie Medvedi (Russia)	54–55	(Sweden) **Ystads IF**	30–28	24–27
**CSM București** (Romania)	50–47	(Austria) Bregenz	28–24	22–23
**TSV St. Otmar St. Gallen** (Switzerland)	53–52	(Sweden) Alingsås HK	27–25	26–27
**RK Nexe** (Croatia)	62–41	(Croatia) GRK Varaždin 1930	30–20	32–31
**Haukar** (Iceland)	63–44^{c}	(North Macedonia) HC Zomimak-M	34–20	29–24
**Team Tvis Holstebro** (Denmark)	64–63	(Portugal) Sporting CP	36–31	28–32
**NMC Górnik Zabrze** (Poland)	54–52	(Ukraine) ZTR Zaporizhia	28–25	26–27
Haslum Handballklubb (Norway)	53–60	(Bosnia and Herzegovina) **RK Borac m:tel**	28–29	25–31
KRAS/Volendam (Netherlands)	55–64	(Belarus) **SKA Minsk**	25–32	30–32
**Chambery Savoie Handball** (France)	66–40	(Slovakia) HC Sporta Hlohovec	35–12	31–28

Notes

^{a} Both legs were hosted by Dinamo București.
^{b} Both legs were hosted by OIF Arendal.
^{c} Both legs were hosted by Haukar.

=== Round 3 ===
A total of 32 teams entered the draw for the third qualification round, which was held on Tuesday, 21 October 2015. Among these teams 16 winners of the previous round.

Team 1	Agg.	Team 2	1st leg	2nd leg
**Pfadi Winterthur** (Switzerland)	59–48	(Poland) KS Azoty-Puławy	29–25	30–23
**Ystads IF** (Sweden)	59–48	(Hungary) Grundfos Tatabanya KC	28–28	31–20
Maribor Branik (Slovenia)	52–57	(Romania) **Dinamo București**	27–26	25–31
Alpla HC Hard (Austria)	46–68	(Belarus) **SKA Minsk**	23–33	23–35
RK Gorenje Velenje (Slovenia)	52–61	(Denmark) **Team Tvis Holstebro**	25–29	27–32
**Aalborg Handball** (Denmark)	62–48	(Switzerland) TSV St. Otmar St. Gallen	30–20	32–28
Hubo Initia Hasselt (Belgium)	46–52	(Spain) **Helvetia Anaitasuna**	20–28	26–24
RK Borac m:tel (Bosnia and Herzegovina)	52–58	(Netherlands) **OCI-LIONS**	29–31	23–27
Talent M.A.T. Plzeň (Czech Republic)	51–66	(Denmark) **Bjerringbro-Silkeborg**	28–31	23–35
RK Nexe (Croatia)	44–48	(France) **HBC Nantes**	26–26	18–22
Füchse Berlin (Germany)	61–65	(France) **Chambery Savoie Handball**	31–31	30–34
NMC Górnik Zabrze (Poland)	58–77	(Germany) **Frisch Auf Göppingen**	29–39	29–38
**CSM București** (Romania)	60–53	(Spain) Frigoríficos del Morrazo	31–24	29–29
**SC Magdeburg** (Germany)	65–61	(Hungary) Csurgói KK	42–37	23–24
Haukar (Iceland)	46–59	(France) **Saint-Raphael Var Handball**	28–29	18–30
**Fraikin BM. Granollers** (Spain)	55–49	(Norway) ØIF Arendal	29–21	26–28

== Group stage ==
Location of teams of the 2015–16 EHF Cup group stage.
Red: Group A; Green: Group B; Blue: Group C; Yellow: Group D.

=== Draw and format ===
The draw of the EHF Cup group phase took place on Thursday, 3 December 2015, at 11:00 CET. The 16 teams allocated into four pots were drawn into four groups of four teams. The country protection rule was applied, i.e. two clubs from the same country could not face each other in the same group.

In each group, teams played against each other home-and-away in a round-robin format. The matchdays were 13–14 February, 20–21 February, 27–28 February, 5–6 March, 19–20 March, and 26–27 March 2016.

If two or more teams are equal on points on completion of the group matches, the following criteria are applied to determine the rankings (in descending order):

1. number of points in matches of all teams directly involved;
2. goal difference in matches of all teams directly involved;
3. higher number of plus goals in matches of all teams directly involved;
4. goal difference in all matches of the group;
5. higher number of plus goals in all matches of the group;

If no ranking can be determined, a decision shall be obtained by drawing lots. Lots shall be drawn by the EHF, if possible in the presence of a responsible of each club.

=== Seeding ===
On 3 December 2015, EHF announced the composition of the group phase seeding pots.

Pot 1	Pot 2	Pot 3	Pot 4
(Spain) Fraikin BM. Granollers	(Germany) SC Magdeburg	(Romania) Dinamo București	(Denmark) Aalborg Handball
(Netherlands) OCI-Lions	(Denmark) Team Tvis Holstebro	(France) HBC Nantes	(Germany) Frisch Auf Göppingen
(Belarus) SKA Minsk	(Denmark) Bjerringbro-Silkeborg	(Switzerland) Pfadi Winterthur	(France) Saint-Raphael Var Handball
(France) Chambery Savoie Handball	(Spain) Helvetia Anaitasuna	(Sweden) Ystads IF	(Romania) CSM București

=== Group A ===
Pos	Team	Pld	W	D	L	GF	GA	GD	Pts	Qualification	MAG	GRA	DIN	AAL
1	(Germany) SC Magdeburg (A)	6	4	0	2	184	162	+22	8	Advance to knockout stage	—	32–28	39–22	25–19
2	(Spain) Fraikin BM. Granollers (A)	6	3	1	2	172	165	+7	7	Advance to knockout stage	34–29	—	28–29	24–24
3	(Romania) Dinamo Bucuresti (E)	6	2	1	3	166	181	−15	5		33–34	26–27	—	28–23
4	(Denmark) Aalborg Handball (E)	6	1	2	3	147	161	−14	4		26–25	25–31	28–28	—

Updated to match(es) played on 27 March 2016. Source:
(A) Advance to a further round; (E) Eliminated

=== Group B ===
Pos	Team	Pld	W	D	L	GF	GA	GD	Pts	Qualification	NAN	GÖP	HOL	OCI
1	(France) HBC Nantes (A)	6	5	0	1	176	151	+25	10	Advance to knockout stage	—	27–24	32–23	30–24
2	(Germany) Frisch Auf Göppingen (A)	6	4	0	2	198	161	+37	8	Advance to knockout stage	27–26	—	36–23	40–20
3	(Denmark) Team Tvis Holstebro (E)	6	3	0	3	167	180	−13	6		27–28	34–31	—	29–24
4	(Netherlands) OCI-Lions (E)	6	0	0	6	154	203	−49	0		26–33	31–40	29–31	—

Updated to match(es) played on 27 March 2016. Source:
Rules for classification: Group stage tiebreakers
(A) Advance to a further round; (E) Eliminated

=== Group C ===
Pos	Team	Pld	W	D	L	GF	GA	GD	Pts	Qualification	SIL	RAP	WIN	MIN
1	(Denmark) Bjerringbro-Silkeborg (A)	6	4	1	1	168	155	+13	9	Advance to knockout stage	—	31−26	27–27	32–26
2	(France) Saint-Raphael Var Handball (A)	6	3	1	2	165	165	0	7	Advance to knockout stage	23–25	—	28–28	31–29
3	(Switzerland) Pfadi Winterthur (E)	6	1	2	3	160	162	−2	4		25–28	21–24	—	32–24
4	(Belarus) SKA Minsk (E)	6	2	0	4	169	180	−11	4		28–25	31–33	31−27	—

Updated to match(es) played on 27 March 2016. Source:
Rules for classification: Group stage tiebreakers
(A) Advance to a further round; (E) Eliminated

=== Group D ===
Pos	Team	Pld	W	D	L	GF	GA	GD	Pts	Qualification	CHA	YST	BUC	HEL
1	(France) Chambery Savoie Handball (A)	6	4	2	0	161	141	+20	10	Advance to knockout stage	—	32–22	23–23	26–23
2	(Sweden) Ystads IF (E)	6	3	1	2	159	167	−8	7		26–27	—	29–28	32–31
3	(Romania) CSM Bucuresti (E)	6	1	3	2	152	156	−4	5		25–25	27–27	—	27–24
4	(Spain) Helvetia Anaitasuna (E)	6	1	0	5	150	158	−8	2		22–28	22–23	28–22	—

Updated to match(es) played on 27 March 2016. Source:
Rules for classification: Group stage tiebreakers
(A) Advance to a further round; (E) Eliminated

=== Ranking of the second-placed teams ===
The ranking of the second-placed teams was carried out on the basis of the team's results in the group stage. Because the French side HBC Nantes, the organizers of the Final 4 tournament, finished on top of their group they qualified directly to the final tournament and only the top three second-placed teams qualified to the quarter-finals.

Grp	Team	Pld	W	D	L	GF	GA	GD	Pts
B	(Germany) Frisch Auf Göppingen	6	4	0	2	198	161	+37	8
A	(Spain) Fraikin BM. Granollers	6	3	1	2	172	165	+7	7
C	(France) Saint-Raphael Var Handball	6	3	1	2	165	165	0	7
D	(Sweden) Ystads IF	6	3	1	2	159	167	−8	7

== Knockout stage ==
=== Quarter-finals ===
==== Draw and format ====
Because the hosts of the Final 4 tournament, HBC Nantes, finished the group stage among the group winners, they have clinched the direct ticket to the final weekend and decided that only three quarter-finals were played for the remaining spots in the final tournament. The draw of the EHF Cup quarter-finals took place on Tuesday 29 March 2016 at the EHF headquarters in Vienna, Austria. Six teams were positioned into two pots. Teams from the same group could not face each other in the quarter-finals. The country protection rule was not applied for the quarter-finals. Therefore, there were two national duels in this round.

In the quarter-finals, teams played against each other on a home-and-away basis, with the teams from second pot playing the first leg at home. The first pot contained the three group winners and the second pot contained the top three second-placed teams.

Pot 1 (Germany) SC Magdeburg (Denmark) Bjerringbro-Silkeborg (France) Chambery Savoie Handball	Pot 2 (Spain) Fraikin BM Granollers (Germany) Frisch Auf Göppingen (France) Saint-Raphael Var Handball

Team 1	Agg.	Team 2	1st leg	2nd leg
Fraikin Granollers (Spain)	56–56	(Denmark) Bjerringbro-Silkeborg	30–24	26–32
Saint-Raphael Var Handball (France)	52–54	(France) Chambery Savoie Handball	30–25	22–29
Frisch Auf Göppingen (Germany)	58–54	(Germany) SC Magdeburg	31–25	27–29

=== Final four ===
Semi-finals
14 May
(France) Chambery Savoie	25
(Germany) FA Göppingen	28
14 May
(Spain) BM Granollers	26
(France) HBC Nantes	27

Final
15 May
(Germany) FA Göppingen	32
(France) HBC Nantes	26
Third place
15 May
(France) Chambery Savoie	21
(Spain) BM Granollers	25

== Top goalscorers ==
Rank	Name	Team	Goals
1	(Spain) Ferran Solé	(Spain) Fraikin BM. Granollers	70
2	(Germany) Marcel Schiller	(Germany) Frisch Auf Göppingen	69
3	(Austria) Robert Weber	(Germany) SC Magdeburg	66
4	(Spain) Valero Rivera Folch	(France) HBC Nantes	59
5	(Spain) Javier Humet	(Romania) CSM Bucuresti	58
5	(Denmark) Michael Damgaard	(Germany) SC Magdeburg	58

== See also ==
- 2015–16 EHF Champions League
- 2015–16 EHF Challenge Cup
