= CSA Steaua București (handball) =

Romanian professional handball club

- Full name: Clubul Sportiv al Armatei Steaua București
- Nickname(s): Roș-Albaștrii (The Red and Blues)
- Short name: Steaua
- Founded: 1949; 77 years ago (in 11 players); 1958; 68 years ago (in 7 players)
- Arena: Sala Polivalentă (Capacity: 5,300); Sala Sporturilor Concordia (Capacity: 1,465)
- Head coach: (Serbia) Nedeljko Matic
- League: Liga Națională
- 2023–24: Liga Națională, 11th of 14
- Club colours
Home	Away

CSA Steaua București is a Romanian professional handball club based in Bucharest, Romania. It competes in the Romanian Handball League. They are part of the CSA Steaua sports organization.

Location of Steaua București

== History ==
Founded in the late 1940s as part of the CSA Steaua army sports club. The handball section has won a record 28 national championships and 9 Romanian cups. Steaua won two EHF Champions League titles as well as reaching two further finals.

In 2006, they won the EHF Challenge Cup with Vasile Stîngă as their coach. The club played under various names throughout the years for sponsorship reasons.

Their biggest rival is Dinamo Bucharest with whom they contest the Bucharest derby.

== Club name history ==
Name	Period
ASA București	1949–1950
CCA București	1950–1961
Steaua București	1961–2006
Steaua MFA București	2006–2010
CSA Steaua București	2010–2015
CSA Steaua Alexandrion	2015–2017
CSA Steaua București	2017–present

== Honours ==
Domestic competitions	European competitions
Liga Națională (in 11 players): Champions (7): 1949–50, 1950–51, 1951–52, 1953–54, 1954–55, 1956–57, 1960–61; Runners-up (3): 1952–53, 1955–56, 1957–58; Romanian League: Champions (28): 1962–63, 1966–67, 1967–68, 1968–69, 1969–70, 1970–71, 1971–72, 1972–73, 1973–74, 1974–75, 1975–76, 1976–77, 1978–79, 1979–80, 1980–81, 1981–82, 1982–83, 1983–84, 1984–85, 1986–87, 1987–88, 1988–89, 1989–90, 1993–94, 1995–96, 1999–00, 2000–01, 2007–08; Runners-up (10): 1961–62, 1963–64, 1964–65, 1965–66, 1977–78, 1985–86, 1996–97, 1998–99, 2006–07, 2017–18; Romanian Cup: Winners (9): 1980–81, 1984–85, 1989–90, 1996–97, 1999–00, 2000–01, 2006–07, 2007–08, 2008–09; Runners-up (10): 1977–78, 1978–79, 1981–82, 1988–89, 1990–91, 1998–99, 2002–03, 2015–16, 2018–19, 2021–22	EHF Champions League: Winners (2): 1967–68, 1976–77; Runners-up (2): 1970–71, 1988–89; Semi-finalists (3): 1969–70, 1974–75, 1985–86; EHF Challenge Cup: Winners (1): 2005–06; EHF Cup: Semi-finalists (2): 1992–93, 1993–94; EHF Cup Winners' Cup: Semi-finalists (1): 2009–10

- Double

Winners (6): 1980–81, 1984–85, 1989–90, 1999–00, 2000–01, 2007–08

== First-team ==
=== Current squad ===
Squad for the 2024–25 season

CSA Steaua București

Goalkeepers

- 16 (Romania) Ionut Ciobanu
- 24 (Romania) Alexandru Pasca
- 58 (Bosnia and Herzegovina) Admir Ahmetasevic

Left Wingers

- 03 (Romania) Claudiu Mazilescu
- 44 (Romania) Sabin Constantina
- 66 (Montenegro) Milan Popović
- 70 (Romania) Vlad Leonard Balan

Right Wingers

- 15 (Romania) Valentin Ghionea
- 19 (Romania) Alexandru Tărîță

Line Players

- 13 (Romania) Valentin Neagu
- 17 (Romania) Eduard-Florin Gheorghe
- 90 (Montenegro) Nemanja Grbović

Left Backs

- 07 (Romania) Gabriel Burlacu
- 6 (Serbia) Krsto Milošević
- 20 (Serbia) Savo Mešter

Central Backs

- 8 (Romania) Ovidiu Irimia
- 27 (Romania) Ciprian Șandru
- 73 (Romania) Octavian Bizău

Right Backs

- 05 (Iran) Shahoo Nosrati
- 34 (Bosnia and Herzegovina) Marko Davidović
- 56 (Romania) Cosmin Ilie

=== Technical staff ===
- Head coach: (Serbia) Nedeljko Matic
- Assistant coach: (Romania) Ştefan Laufceac
- Goalkeeping coach: (Romania) Ionuţ Ciobanu
- Fitness coach: (Romania) Marius Tudor

=== Transfers ===
Transfers for the 2026–27 season

Joining

- (Serbia) Boško Stanisavljević (RB) from (Serbia) RK Dinamo Pančevo

Leaving

- (Iran) Shahoo Nosrati (RB)
- (Moldova) Maxim Oancea (LB)
- (Romania) Vasile Dobrincu (RW) to (Romania) CSO Teutonii Ghimbav

=== Transfer History ===
Transfers for the 2025–26 season

Joining

Leaving

- (Montenegro) Nemanja Grbović (LP) to (Romania) HC Buzău
- (Montenegro) Milan Popović (LW) to (Montenegro) RK Lovćen
- (Bosnia and Herzegovina) Marko Davidović (CB) to (Hungary) Szigetszentmiklósi KSK
- (Bosnia and Herzegovina) Admir Ahmetašević (GK) to (Germany) TG Landshut
- (Romania) Alexandru Tărîță (RW) to (Romania) HC Buzău
- (Romania) Octavian Bizău (CB) to (Romania) CS Universitatea Cluj
- (Romania) Valentin Neagu (LP) to (Germany) Dessau-Roßlauer HV
- (Romania) Alexandru Mihai Pasca (GK) to (Romania) CSM Constanța

== European record ==
=== European Cup and Champions League ===
Season	Round	Club	Home	Away	Aggregate
1967–68; Winners	Round 2	(Luxembourg) HB Dudelange	37–14	29–10	66–24
1967–68; Winners	Quarter-finals	(Germany) VfL Gummersbach	15–9	14–13	29–22
1967–68; Winners	Semi-finals	(East Germany) SC Dynamo Berlin	16–12	15–16	31–28
1967–68; Winners	Finals	(Czech Republic) Dukla Prague	13–11		
1976–77; Winners	Round 1	(Italy) Pallamano Trieste	38–21	38–18	76–39
1976–77; Winners	Round 2	(Luxembourg) HB Dudelange	35–17	28–11	63–28
1976–77; Winners	Quarter-finals	(Spain) CB Calpisa	22–19	18–20	40–39
1976–77; Winners	Semi-finals	(Denmark) KFUM Fredericia	29–22	19–19	48–41
1976–77; Winners	Finals	(Soviet Union) CSKA Moscow	21–20		

=== EHF Challenge Cup ===
Season	Round	Club	Home	Away	Aggregate
2005–06; Winners	Round 3	(Greece) AC Diomidis Argous	33–28	32–22	65–50
2005–06; Winners	Round 4	(Iceland) KA Akureyri	30–21	23–24	53–45
2005–06; Winners	Quarter-finals	(North Macedonia) Vardar Skopje	34–29	31–35	65–64
2005–06; Winners	Semi-finals	(Croatia) Medveščak Zagreb	30–28	24–25	54–53
2005–06; Winners	Finals	(Portugal) Sporting Club Horta	34–27	21–26	55–53

=== EHF ranking ===
As of 5/12/2025

Rank	Team	Points
138	(Lithuania) Dragūnas Klaipėda	30
139	(Germany) HSV Hamburg	30
140	(Belgium) HC Visé BM	30
141	(Romania) Steaua București	29
142	(Belgium) Achilles Bocholt	29
143	(Cyprus) Parnassos Strovolou	28
144	(Sweden) HK Malmö	28

== Former club members ==
=== Notable former players ===
- (Romania) Silviu Băiceanu (1999–2003)
- (Romania) Ciprian Beșta (1991–1994)
- (Romania) Ștefan Birtalan (1970–1985)
- (Romania) Octavian Bizău (2017–2019)
- (Romania) Sebastian Bota (1991–1997)
- (Romania) Alexandru Buligan (1981–1982)
- (Romania) Ionuț Ciobanu (2005–2010, 2021-)
- (Romania) Alexandru Dedu (1991–1996)
- (Romania) Cristian Gațu (1968–1978)
- (Romania) Gheorghe Gruia (1961–1973)
- (Romania) (Spain) Javier Humet (2018–2020)
- (Romania) Ionuț Iancu (2021–)
- (Romania) Josef Jakob (1963–1971)
- (Romania) Andrei Mihalcea (2018–)
- (Romania) Marius Novanc (2005–2010)
- (Romania) Cornel Oțelea (1958–1970)
- (Romania) Alin Șania (2005–2009)
- (Romania) Ciprian Șandru (2021–)
- (Romania) (Germany) Hansi Schmidt (1961–1963)
- (Romania) Tudor Stănescu (2016–)
- (Romania) Marius Stavrositu (2007–2010, 2017-2019)
- (Romania) Vasile Stîngă (1977–1989)
- (Romania) Werner Stöckl (1969–1981)
- (Romania) Marius Szőke (2011–2017)
- (Romania) Radu Voina (1972–1991)
- (Romania) Dan Rosescu (1964–1970)
- (Bosnia and Herzegovina) Marin Vegar (2018–2019)
- (Belarus) Ivan Matskevich (2015–2017)
- (Brazil) João Pedro Silva (2019-2020)
- (Brazil) Guilherme Valadão Gama (2019-2020)
- (Chile) Rodrigo Salinas Muñoz (2014-2015)
- (Croatia) Nikola Kedžo (2017-2019)
- (Cuba) Guillermo Corzo (2014–2015)
- (Egypt) Ahmed Khairy (2020-2021)
- (Iran) Mohsen Babasafari (2017-2019)
- (Iran) Alireza Mousavi (2022-)
- (Montenegro) Nemanja Grbović (2018-2019, 2020-)
- (Montenegro) Milan Popović (2021-)
- (Russia) Samvel Aslanyan (2017-2021)
- (Serbia) Miloš Kostadinović (2016-2018)
- (Serbia) Krsto Milošević (2018-)
- (Serbia) (Croatia) Stefan Vujić (2017-2019)
- (Tunisia) Mosbah Sanaï (2020-2021)
- (Serbia) Obrad Ivezic (2007-2010)
