= Măgheruș =

Măgheruș may refer to several places in Romania:

- Măgheruș, a village in Ozun Commune, Covasna County
- Măgheruș, a village in the city of Toplița, Harghita County
- Măgheruș, a village in Nadeș Commune, Mureș County
- Șieu-Măgheruș, a commune in Bistrița-Năsăud County
- Măgheruș (Bega Veche), a tributary of the Bega Veche in Timiș County
- Măgheruș (Mureș), a tributary of the Mureș in Harghita County
- Măgheruș, a tributary of the Șieu in Bistrița-Năsăud County
- Mogheruș, a tributary of the Uz
