= Szőke =

Szoke may refer to:

- Szőke, Hungary, a village in Baranya county
- Szőke (surname), a Hungarian surname
