= Murani swamps =

- IUCN category IV (habitat/species management area)
- Location within Romania
- Location: Murani (Pișchia), Timiș County, Romania
- Coordinates: 45°57′17″N 21°21′6″E
- Area: 329.8 ha (815 acres)
- Established: 1995, 2000

The Murani swamps are a protected area of national interest, classified as an IUCN Category IV ornithological nature reserve. They are located in Timiș County, within the administrative boundaries of Pișchia commune. The protected area is home to 60 bird species that are safeguarded under international conventions to which Romania is a signatory.

== Location ==
The marshland is situated in the northwestern part of Timiș County, near the border with Arad County, to the east of the village of Murani. It lies along county road DJ693 (Pișchia–Seceani) and the A1 motorway, approximately 31 kilometres from Timișoara.

== Description ==
The Murani swamps were declared a protected area by Law No. 5 of March 6, 2000. The protected site covers an area of 329.8 hectares. Murani Lake, located northeast of the village and west of the Pișchia Forest, was created in 1971 through the damming of the Măgheruș Stream. The lake extends approximately 4 kilometres in length and spans an area of about 200 hectares. It was formed in place of a marshy valley that ranged between 200 and 600 metres in width and stretched for several kilometres.

At the upper end of the lake, reed and rush vegetation developed, creating a suitable habitat that facilitated the colonization of the area by several significant aquatic bird species. Upstream from the dam, the landscape features a zone dominated by dense stands of wattle and willow shrubs. The site is bordered by agricultural land.

Together with the Pișchia Forest, the Murani swamps are recognized by BirdLife International as an Important Bird Area (IBA) under the code RO030, meeting the European IBA criteria A1 and B2.

=== Avifauna ===
The protected area encompasses a variety of habitat types, including both flowing and stagnant waters, marshes, peatlands, transitional forest zones, agricultural lands, and Pannonian meadows. These habitats support a diverse range of wetland-specific flora and fauna. The Murani swamps are recognized as one of Romania's 44 avifaunistically important areas.

The area hosts several bird species, both migratory and transient, that are protected at the European level under Directive 2009/147/EC of 30 November 2009. Notable species include the western marsh harrier (Circus aeruginosus), black tern (Chlidonias niger), whiskered tern (Chlidonias hybrida), white stork (Ciconia ciconia), great crested grebe (Podiceps cristatus), coot (Fulica atra), greylag goose (Anser anser), greater white-fronted goose (Anser albifrons), lesser white-fronted goose (Anser erythropus), mallard (Anas platyrhynchos), and common pochard (Aythya ferina).
