= Josef Jakob =

Romanian handball player and coach (born 1939)

Josef Jakob Iosif Iacob
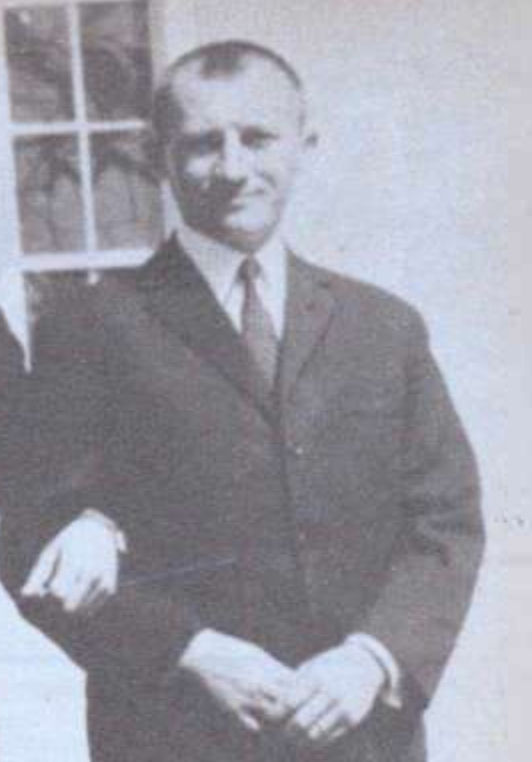

Personal information
- Nationality: Romanian; German
- Born: 11 September 1939 (age 87) Carani, Romania

Sport
- Sport: Handball
- Position: Right wing

Youth career
- Years: Team
- 1955–1956: Electromotor Timișoara
- 1956–1957: Progresul Timișoara

Senior clubs
- Years: Team
- 1957–1963: Tehnometal Timișoara
- 1963–1971: Steaua Bucharest
National team
| Years | Team | Apps | (Gls) |
| 1962–1971 | Romanian | 45 | (121) |
Title
- World Champion; EHF Champions League winner Six national titles winner

Josef Jakob (sometimes spelled Iosif Iacob; born 11 September 1939 in Carani) is a Romanian former handball player and coach of Banat Swabian descent, who as a player won the World Championship and the EHF Champions League.

With Steaua Bucharest he won the national championship six times. In the 1960s he was considered to be the best right wing player in the world.

His speciality were fast breaks and goal area passes to the pivot or the left winger. In 45 national team games he scored 121 goals.

== Player ==
=== Youth years ===
Josef Jakob began playing field handball when he was in sixth grade. In 1955 he interrupted his high school education when he was asked to join Electromotor Timișoara. The team merged with Progresul Timișoara the same year, and they placed second after CFR Timișoara in the regional league.

=== Top league ===
In 1957 Jakob transferred to top-league team Tehnometal Timișoara, where he had Adam Fischer as coach. While playing there, he was called up for the first time to the national youth team, where he made his debut in a match in Poland. Jakob played three more years field handball for Tehnometal.

In 1962 he was asked by Steaua Bucharest to play in the Spartakiad for military teams. Between 1964 and 1966 he became twice national vicechampion with Steaua. In 1968, Jakob won with Steaua the EHF Champions League in Frankfurt am Main against HC Dukla Prague. In the same year, he and Gheorghe Gruia were selected for the world team. Between 1968 and 1971 Steaua won the national championship four times in a row.

=== National team player ===
In 1962 he was called up for the first time to the national team. In November 1963, the national team started a five-month training camp in preparation for the 1964 World Championship, a gathering that was only interrupted for short-time friendlies in Western Germany and Switzerland.

== Coach ==
In 1971 Jakob became playing coach for LTV Wuppertal in Western Germany, where he stayed for four years. Although in the beginning he was there with the permission of the Romanian communist authorities, in 1972 he returned a last time to Romania to renew his passport, but after that decided to settle down in Western Germany, which earned him a five-year prison sentence in absentia for desertion, as he was a military officer.

Later he managed HTV Remscheid and RTV Remscheid, before becoming manager of Turnerschaft Esslingen in 1979. There he stayed for a year, after which he became playing coach for TSV Scharnhausen. Between 1982 and 1985 he managed Wernauer Sportfreunde. The next six years he managed TSV Neuhausen. After a short stint in Bernhausen, he managed RSK Esslingen during the 1992/93 season, before returning to TSV Neuhausen. In 1997 he became manager of TSV Denkendorf, where he ended his coaching career in 1999.

== Awards ==
In 1964, after winning the World Championship in Czechoslovakia, he was given the "Maestru Emerit al Sportului" award (Honoured Master of Sports).

In 2009 Jakob was awarded "Sport Merit Award" Second Class.
