= Szentandrás =

Szentandrás is the Hungarian name for two places in Romania:

- Sântandrei village, Simeria Town, Hunedoara County
- Sânandrei Commune, Timiș County
