= Băcin =

- Location within Romania

Location
- Country: Romania
- Counties: Timiș County
- Villages: Nadăș, Bencecu de Jos

Physical characteristics
- Mouth: Bega Veche
  - location: Pișchia
  - coordinates: 45.920°N 21.381°E
- Length: 22 km (14 mi)
- Basin size: 67 km^{2} (26 sq mi)

Basin features
- Progression: Bega Veche→ Bega→ Tisza→ Danube→ Black Sea

The Băcin is a left tributary of the river Bega Veche in Romania. It discharges into the Bega Veche near Pișchia. Its length is 22 km (14 mi) and its basin size is 67 km^{2} (26 sq mi).
