= Remetea =

Remetea may refer to several places in Romania:

- Remetea, Bihor, a commune in Bihor County
- Remetea, Harghita, a commune in Harghita County
- Remetea, a village in Meteș Commune, Alba County
- Remetea, a district in the city of Târgu Mureș, Mureș County

== See also ==
- Remetea Chioarului, a commune in Maramureș County
- Remetea Mare, a commune in Timiș County
- Remetea-Pogănici, a village in Fârliug Commune, Caraş-Severin County
- Remetea Oaşului, a village in Orașu Nou Commune, Satu Mare County
- Remetea-Luncă, a village in Mănăștiur Commune, Timiș County
- Remetea Mică, a village in Mașloc Commune, Timiș County
