= Octavian Bizău =

Romanian handball player (born 1997)

Octavian Cătălin Bizău
Personal information
- Full name: Octavian Cătălin Bizău
- Nationality: Romanian
- Born: 21 November 1997 (age 28) Baia Mare
- Height: 1.94 m (6 ft 4 in)

Sport
- Sport: Handball
- Position: Centre back
- Current club: CSA Steaua București
- Number: 73

Youth career
- Years: Team
- –2016: Minaur Baia Mare

Senior clubs
- Years: Team
- 2016–2020: CSM București
- 2017–2019: → Steaua București
- 2020–2023: CS Dinamo București
- 2023-: CSA Steaua București
National team
- Years: Team
- 2017–: Romania

Octavian Bizău (born 21 November 1997) is a Romanian handballer who plays for CSA Steaua București.

== Achievements ==
- Liga Națională
  - Gold medalist: 2021, 2022, 2023
  - Silver medalist: 2017
- Cupa României
  - Gold medalist: 2020, 2021, 2022
- Supercupa României
  - Gold medalist: 2020, 2022

== Individual awards ==
- Romanian Liga Națională Best Under-21 Player: 2018
