= Marin Vegar =

Bosnian handball player

Personal information
- Nationality: Bosnian, Croatian
- Born: 22 January 1990 (age 36) Čapljina, SR Bosnia and Herzegovina
- Height: 1.99 m (6 ft 6 in)

Sport
- Sport: Handball
- Position: Left back
- Current club: CSM Constanta
- Number: 27

Senior clubs
- Years: Team
- -2008: HRK Izvidac Ljubuski (Bosnia and Herzegovina)
- 2008-2011: RK Dubrovnik (Croatia)
- 2012-2013: HRK Capljina (Bosnia and Herzegovina)
- 2013-2017: RK Nexe (Croatia)
- 2017-2019: CSA Steaua Bucuresti (Romania)
- 2019-2021: RK Eurofarm Pelister (North Macedonia)
- 2021-: CSM Constanta (Romania)
National team
| Years | Team | Apps | (Gls) |
| 2016- | Bosnia and Herzegovina | 15 | (65) |

Marin Vegar (born 22 January 1990) is a Bosnian handball player who is currently player for Romanian club CSM Constanta and the Bosnian national team.

He represented Bosnia and Herzegovina at the 2020 European Men's Handball Championship.
