= Bogda =

- Commune
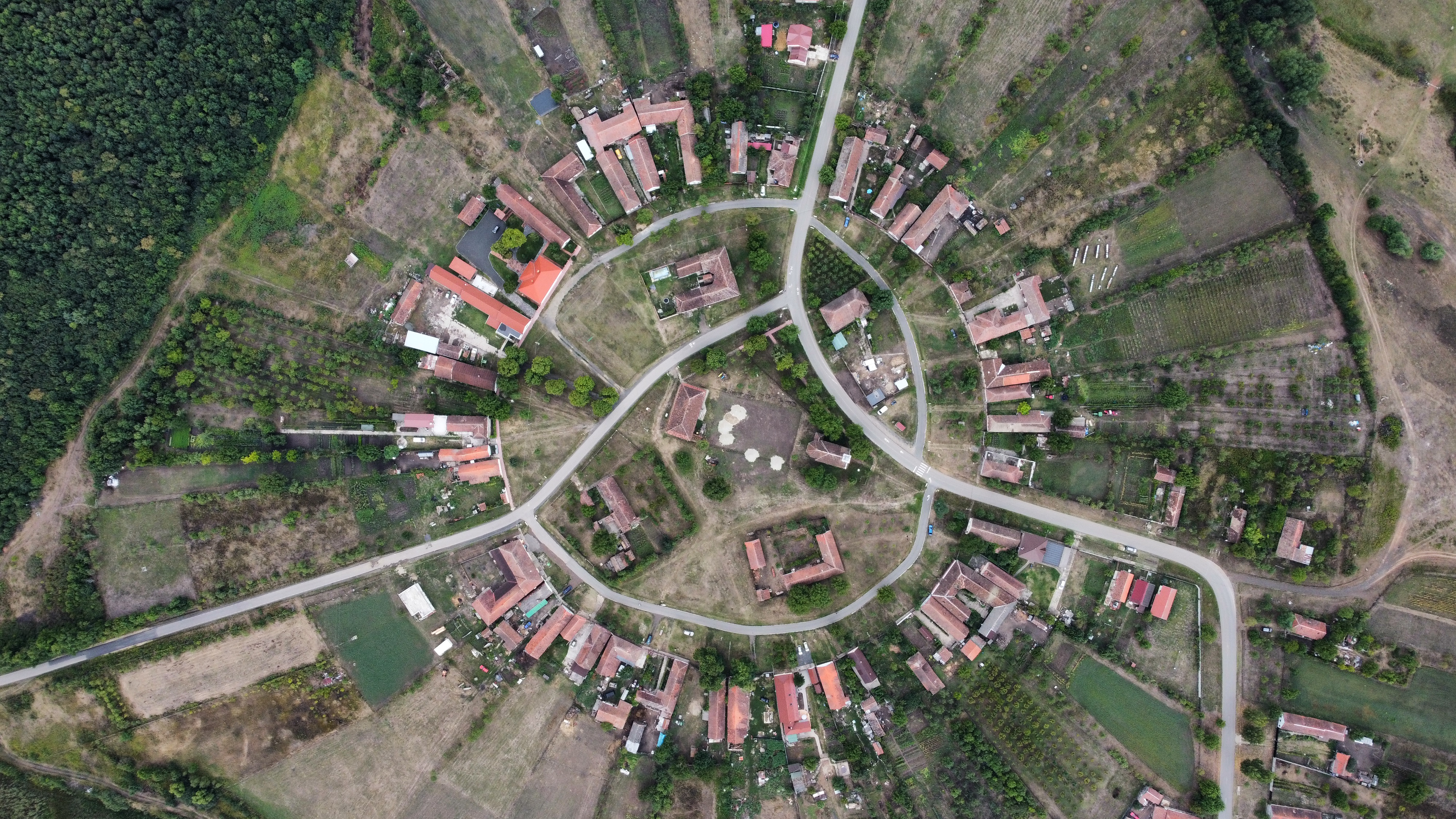
- Charlottenburg, the only Rundling in Banat

- Location in Timiș County

- Location in Romania
- Coordinates: 45°58′27″N 21°35′31″E
- Country: Romania
- County: Timiș

Government
  - Mayor (2020–): Iasmin-Ciprian Iovănuț (PSD)
- Area: 78.67 km^{2} (30.37 sq mi)
- Population (2021-12-01): 448
  - Density: 5.69/km^{2} (14.7/sq mi)
- Time zone: UTC+02:00 (EET)
  - Summer (DST): UTC+03:00 (EEST)
- Postal code: 307070–307076
- Vehicle reg.: TM
- Website: www.primariabogda.ro

Bogda (German: Neuhof; Hungarian: Rigósfürdő, until 1899 Bogdarigós) is a commune in Timiș County, Romania. It is composed of six villages: Altringen, Bogda (commune seat), Buzad, Charlottenburg, Comeat and Sintar.

== History ==
The first recorded mention dates from 1436, under the name Bagd. Medieval documents record two villages, Felse Baagd and Alsö Baagd ("Upper Bogda" and "Lower Bogda"), which will later merge, so that in 1476 only Bagd is mentioned.

Until 1718, Bogda was administered by the Turks. Austro-Hungarians expelled the Turks and established their own administration here after 1718; native population was deprived of land, being employed on Hungarian counts' estates. The basic activities were timber exploitation, animal husbandry and cereal farming. On the Austrian maps of 1723 and 1761, it appears under the name Bogdan. Between 1770 and 1771, the entire area was included in the second large colonization with German population initiated by Queen Maria Theresa and her son Joseph II. Bogda received the name Neuhof. Sintar was called Buchberg (after Chancellor Eduard Buchberg), and Comeat was Lichtenwald (the Germans left the village in 1782). Charlottenburg, the only Rundling in Banat, was founded by 32 families from Trento, Lorraine and Baden-Württemberg. The existence of these villages is mainly due to Count Karl Ignaz Clay-Aldringen, appointed in 1769 president of the Banat administration. This is how one the villages will be called Altringen. Charlottenburg is named after Aldringen's wife. In fact, the two are the only localities whose names have not been Romanianized. In the 19th century, the owners of Bogda were Ede Altmann, then Ioan Steiner and Anton Negele. At the insistence of the latter, the Hungarian Interior Ministry change its name to Bogdarigós.

Between the two world wars, Buzad was incorporated into the commune, which until 1926 was under the administration of the commune of Hodoș. During this period, Bogda was a mixed Romanian-German village. It had a choir, a fanfare and a credit union. After World War II, the German community disintegrated, many emigrated, so that by the early 1990s there were no Germans left in Bogda. Overall, it has experienced a continuous decline, with a short period of prosperity caused by the industrialization of agriculture, but against the background of a continuous depopulation. Through the systematization policy of the communist regime, the commune of Bogda was abolished in May 1989 and passed into the administration of the commune of Mașloc. It was re-established in January 1990. The communists planned the demolition of the villages in order to build farms here, but this did not happen. Most of the abandoned houses were bought by the people of Timișoara, being transformed into holiday homes or guest houses.

== Demographics ==
Ethnic composition (2021)
1. Romanians (83.5%)
2. Hungarians (2.00%)
3. Ukrainians (1.33%)
4. Others (13.2%)
Religious composition (2021)
1. Orthodox (80.1%)
2. Roman Catholics (3.57%)
3. Unknown (11.8%)
4. Others (3.14%)
5. Irreligious, atheists and agnostics (1.33%)

Bogda had a population of 448 inhabitants at the 2021 census, down 2.61% from the 2011 census. Most inhabitants are Romanians (83.48%), but there are also minorities of Hungarians (2%) and Ukrainians (1.33%). By religion, most inhabitants are Orthodox (80.13%), with a minority of Roman Catholics (3.57%). For 11.83% of the population, religious affiliation is unknown.

Census		Ethnic composition
Year	Population	Romanians	Hungarians	Germans	Ukrainians
1880	2,277	1,331	53	886	–
1890	2,460	1,474	95	867	–
1900	2,713	1,697	130	877	–
1910	2,655	1,709	133	803	–
1920	2,566	1,658	99	805	–
1930	2,471	1,713	66	677	–
1941	2,416	1,717	61	631	–
1956	1,939	1,465	48	425	–
1966	1,479	1,188	31	257	–
1977	1,053	836	27	136	33
1992	578	516	13	23	21
2002	470	434	8	11	12
2011	460	423	4	3	10
2021	448	374	9	4	6

== Politics and administration ==
The commune of Bogda is administered by a mayor and a local council composed of 9 councilors. The mayor, Iasmin-Ciprian Iovănuț, from the Social Democratic Party, has been in office since 2020. As from the 2024 local elections, the local council has the following composition by political parties:

Party	Seats	Composition
Social Democratic Party–National Liberal Party	6	
Alliance for the Union of Romanians	2	
Save Romania Union–People's Movement Party–Force of the Right	1	

== Gallery ==
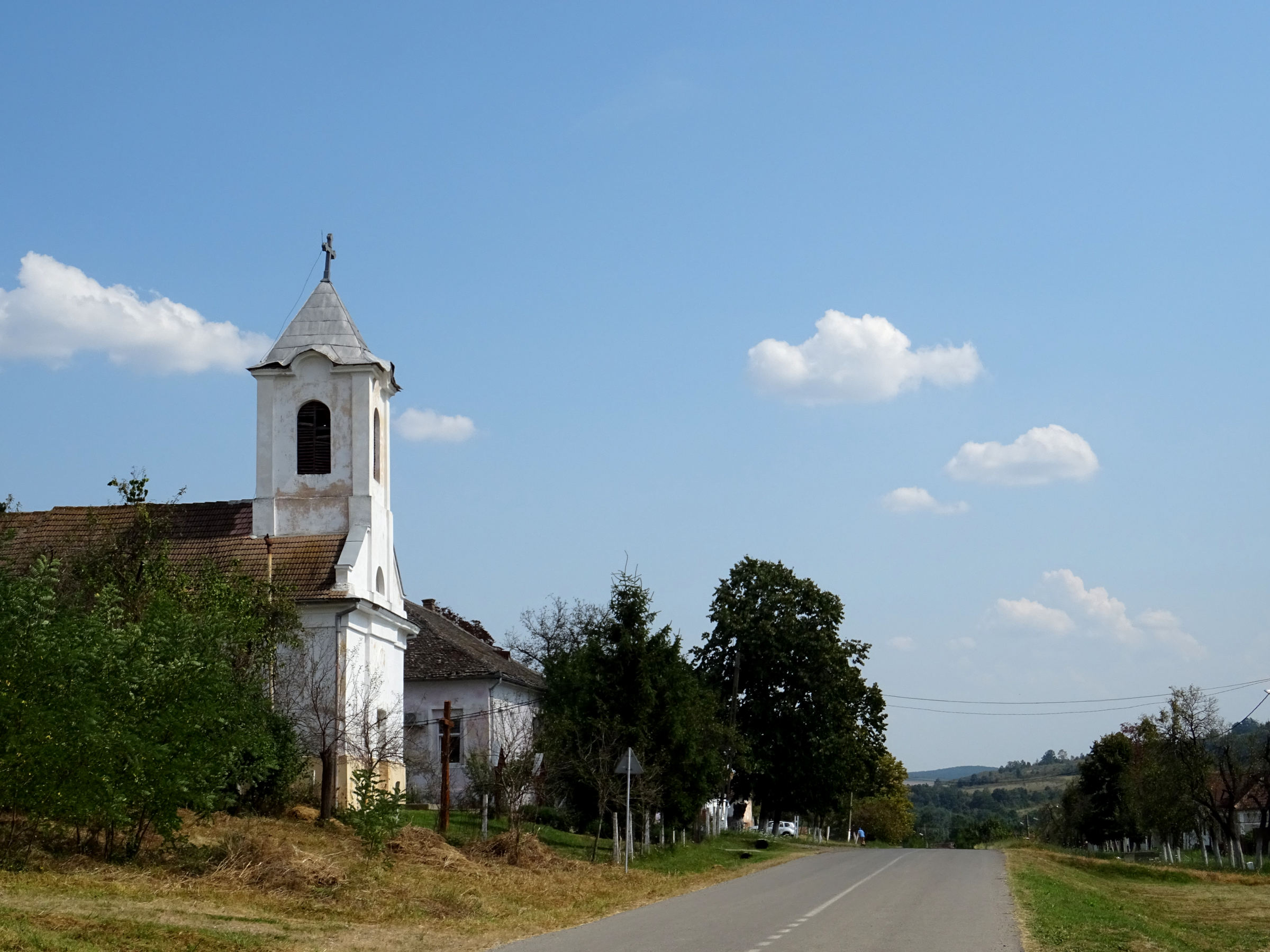
Main street in Bogda

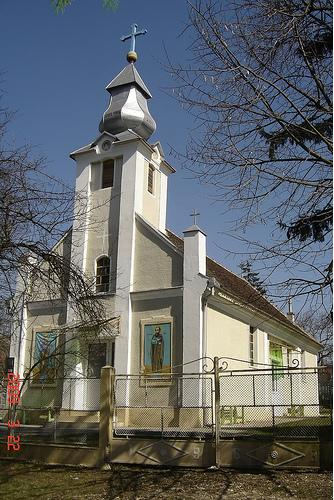
Orthodox church in Buzad

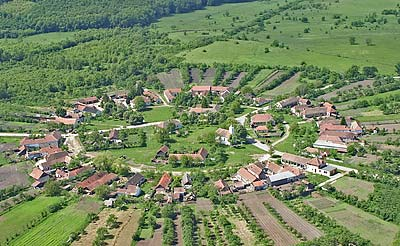
Charlottenburg

== Notable people ==
- Dionisie Iovi (1939–2015), Banat folk music performer
- Vasile Bucur (b. 1940), poet in Banat dialect
