= Măgheruș (Bega Veche) =

- Location within Romania

Location
- Country: Romania
- Counties: Timiș County

Physical characteristics
- Mouth: Bega Veche
  - coordinates: 45.8464°N 21.2161°E
- Length: 42 km (26 mi)
- Basin size: 159 km^{2} (61 sq mi)

Basin features
- Progression: Bega Veche→ Bega→ Tisza→ Danube→ Black Sea
- Tributaries
  - right: Giuroc, Luda Bara

The Măgheruș is a right tributary of the river Bega Veche in Romania. It discharges into the Bega Veche in Covaci. Its length is 42 km (26 mi) and its basin size is 159 km^{2} (61 sq mi).

The Murani Dam is located on the Măgheruș.
