= Samvel Aslanyan =

Russian handball player

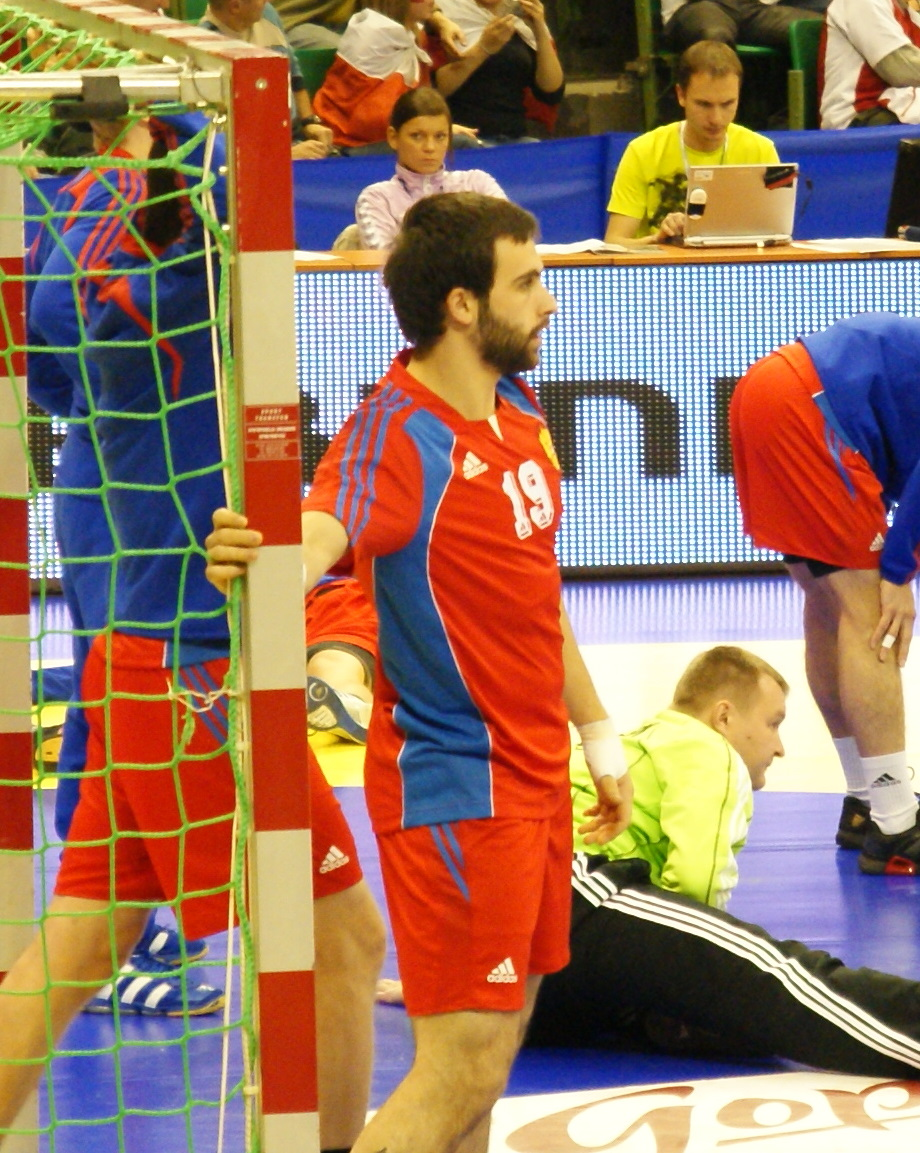

Personal information
- Full name: Samvel Ovikovich Aslanyan
- Nationality: Russian
- Born: 23 February 1986 (age 40) Voronezh, Russian SFSR, USSR
- Height: 1.86 m (6 ft 1 in)

Sport
- Sport: Handball
- Position: Right back
- Current club: Steaua București
- Number: 69

Senior clubs
- Years: Team
- (Russia) HC Energiya Voronezh
- –2013: (Russia) Chekhovskiye Medvedi
- 2013–2016: (Russia) Permskie Medvedi
- 2016: (Portugal) Sporting CP
- 2016–2017: (Romania) CSM București
- 2017–2021: (Romania) Steaua București
National team
| Years | Team | Apps | (Gls) |
| – | Russia | 77 | (113) |

Samvel Ovikovich Aslanyan (Russian: Самвел Овикович Асланян; born 23 February 1986) is a Russian handball player who plays for Steaua București. He competed at the 2008 Summer Olympics in Beijing, where the Russian team placed sixth.
