= Dan Rosescu =

Romanian-American handball player and coach (1944–2004)

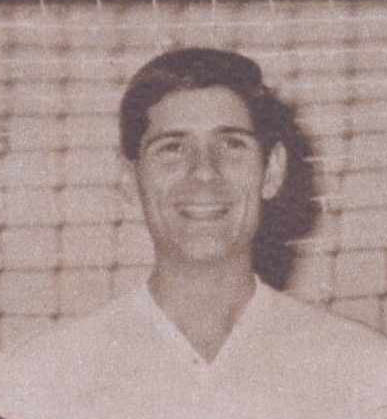
Image of Dan Roșescu

Dan Rosescu (September 25, 1944 in Bucharest, Romania – September 21, 2004 in Los Angeles, CA, US) was a Romanian-American professional handball player and coach.

== Career ==
Dan started his handball career at the "Clubul Sportiv Scolar" in Bucharest, Romania, back in 1961–1962, having Cristian Gatu, Gheorghe Goran, and Mihai Marinescu as teammates, and Virgil Trofin as a coach. CSS, having such elite players, won multiple Junior League National championships, and also multiple international tournaments. Later on, Dan Rosescu was drafted by Steaua Bucharest Club in 1964, where he helped the club become 3 times National Champions, and European Champions in 1968.

Dan Rosescu relocated to the US in 1984, at age 40. In the US, he helped form the "Los Angeles Crusaders" handball team, where he was active as a player and coach. Best result: 7th place at the 1985 US Championships in Colorado Springs, CO.

A few years later, he was selected by the US Team Handball Federation, to coach the US West Coast male team for the Pre-Olympics National Tournament. The West Coast Team won the tournament that year.

== Gallery ==
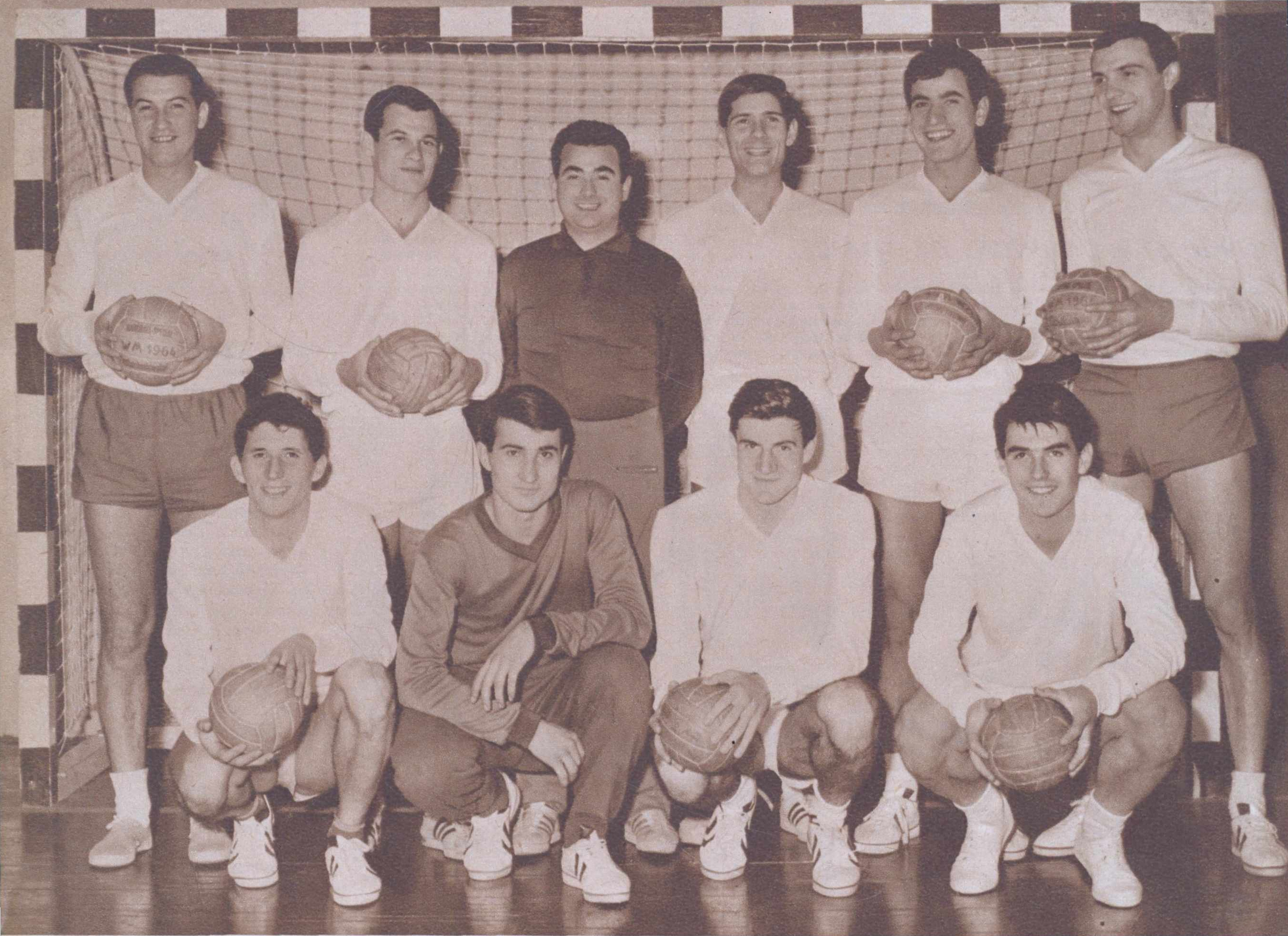
Romania's national youth team in 1965

Steaua Bucuresti - European champions - 1968

Maestri ai Sportului - 1968
