= Szőke (surname) =

Szoke is a surname. Notable people with the surname include:

- Aurelia Szoke (1936–2013), Romanian handball player
- Helen Szoke (born 1954), Australian non-profit chief executive
- István Szőke (1947–2022), Hungarian footballer
- Július Szöke (born 1995), Slovak footballer
- Katalin Szőke (1935–2017), Hungarian swimmer
- László Szőke (1930–2014), Hungarian footballer
- Lonnie Szoke (born 1978), Canadian musician
- Marius Szőke (born 1993), Romanian handball player
- Nikoletta Szőke (born 1983), Hungarian jazz singer
- Péter Szőke (1947–2022), Hungarian tennis player
- Sandor Szoke (1926–1990), Australian fencer
