= Tudor Stănescu =

Romanian handball player (born 1989)

Personal information
- Full name: Tudor Stănescu
- Nationality: Romanian
- Born: 19 June 1989 (age 37) Vaslui, Romania
- Height: 1.95 m (6 ft 5 in)

Sport
- Sport: Handball
- Position: Goalkeeper
- Current club: Steaua București

Senior clubs
- Years: Team
- –2012: Universitatea Cluj-Napoca
- 2012–2013: CSU Suceava
- 2013–2015: Politehnica Timișoara
- 2015–2016: HC Vaslui
- 2016–: Steaua București
National team
- Years: Team
- 2016–: Romania

Tudor Stănescu (born 19 June 1989) is a Romanian handballer who plays for Steaua București and the Romania national team.

== Achievements ==
- Liga Națională:
  - Silver Medalist: 2018

== Individual awards ==
- All-Star Goalkeeper of the Liga Națională: 2018
