= Krsto Milošević =

Serbian handball player (born 1988)

Personal information
- Nationality: Serbian
- Born: 6 January 1988 (age 38) Belgrade, Serbia
- Height: 1.94 m (6 ft 4 in)

Sport
- Sport: Handball
- Position: Left back
- Current club: Steaua București
- Number: 5

Senior clubs
- Years: Team
- –2010: RK Partizan
- 2010–2012: Mors-Thy Håndbold
- 2012–2013: HBW Balingen-Weilstetten
- 2013–2014: RK Radnički
- 2014–2017: CSM București
- 2017–2018: Politehnica Timișoara
- 2018–: Steaua București

Krsto Milošević (born 6 January 1988) is a Serbian handball player who plays for Steaua București.

== Achievements ==
- Serbian Superleague:
  - Silver Medalist: 2014
- Serbian Cup:
  - Gold Medalist: 2010
- Serbian Cup :
  - Silver Medalist: 2016
- Liga Națională:
  - Silver Medalist: 2017
- Romanian Cup:
  - Gold Medalist: 2016
