= Martin Larsen =

Danish handball player (born 1992)

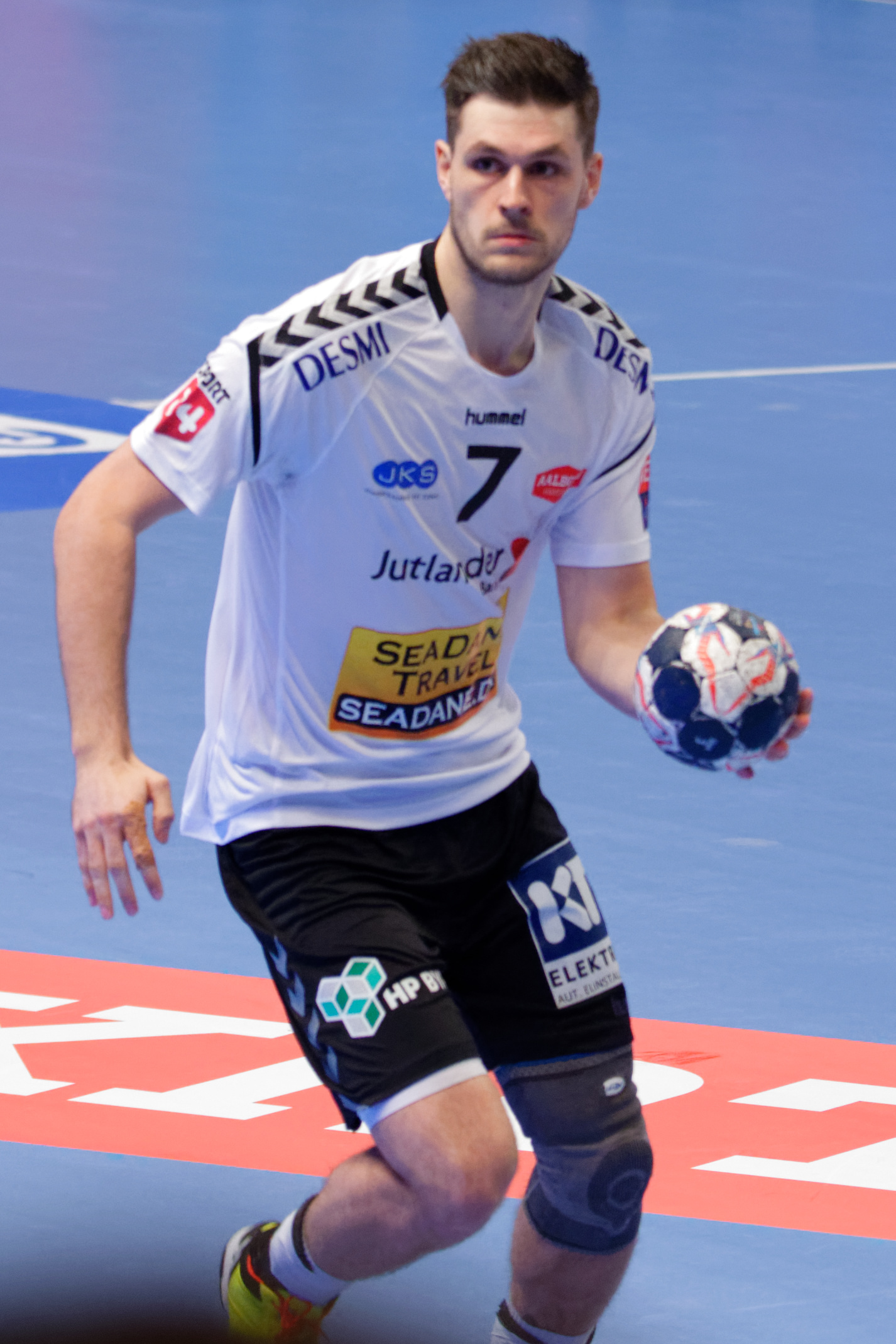

Personal information
- Nationality: Danish
- Born: 19 September 1992 (age 34) Aalborg, Denmark
- Height: 1.95 m (6 ft 5 in)

Sport
- Sport: Handball
- Position: Right Back
- Current club: Aalborg Håndbold
- Number: 17

Senior clubs
- Years: Team
- 2005–2018: Aalborg Håndbold
- 2018–2020: Pays d'Aix
- 2020–2021: SC DHfK Leipzig Handball
- 2021–2025: Aalborg Håndbold
National team
| Years | Team | Apps | (Gls) |
| 2015– | Denmark | 12 | (20) |

Martin Larsen (born 19 February 1992) is a Danish handball player for Aalborg Håndbold and the Danish national team.

In 2025 he won the Danish Cup with Aalborg Håndbold, beating Bjerringbro-Silkeborg in the final. Later the same season he won the Danish championship.
