= Aliaksandr Patsykailik =

Belarusian handball player (born 1990)

Personal information
- Nationality: Belarusian
- Born: 8 March 1990 (age 36) Minsk, Belarus
- Height: 1.90 m (6 ft 3 in)

Sport
- Sport: Handball
- Position: Right wing
- Current club: SKA Minsk
- Number: 3
National team
Years	Team	Apps	(Gls)
–	Belarus	0	(0)

Aliaksandr Patsykailik (Belarusian: Аляксандр Пацыкайлік; born on 8 March 1990) is a Belarusian handball player. He plays for SKA Minsk and the Belarusian national team.

He competed at the 2016 European Men's Handball Championship.
