= Marius Szőke =

Romanian handball player (born 1993)

Personal information
- Full name: Marius Szőke
- Nationality: Romanian
- Born: 21 January 1993 (age 33) Sfântu Gheorghe, Romania

Sport
- Sport: Handball
- Position: Playmaker
- Current club: Steaua București
- Number: 15

Senior clubs
- Years: Team
- 2011-: Steaua București
National team
- Years: Team
- –: Romania

Marius Szőke (born 21 January 1993) is a Romanian handballer who plays as a centre back for Steaua Alexandrion București and the Romania national team.
