= Javier Humet =

Spanish-born Romanian handball player (born 1990)

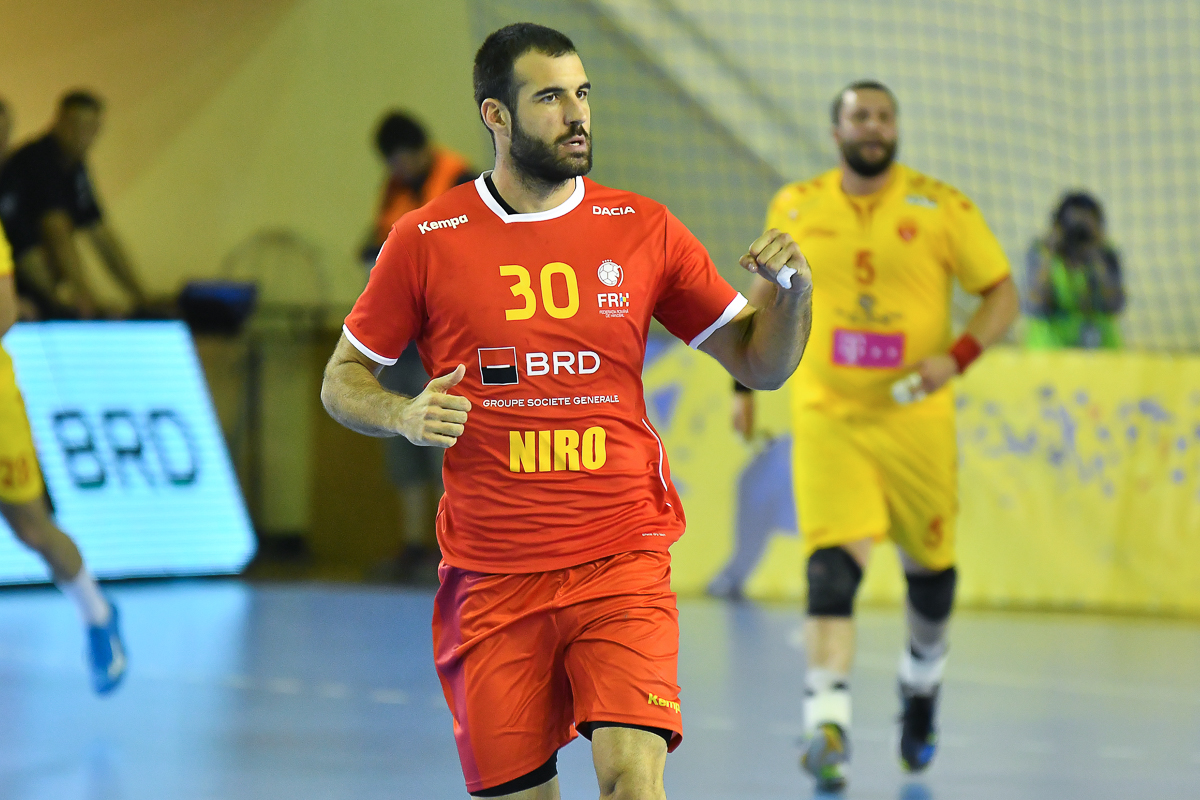
- Humet playing for Romania in 2018

Personal information
- Full name: Javier Humet Gaminde
- Nationality: Spanish/Romanian
- Born: 22 January 1990 (age 36) Barcelona, Spain
- Height: 1.96 m (6 ft 5 in)

Sport
- Sport: Handball
- Position: Right Back
- Current club: Al Rayyan
- Number: 51

Senior clubs
- Years: Team
- 2008–2011: Portland San Antonio
- 2011–2012: Caja3 Aragón
- 2012–2013: HCM Constanța
- 2013–2014: US Ivry Handball
- 2014–2015: HCM Constanța
- 2015–2018: CSM București
- 2018–2020: Steaua București
- 2020–2024: Dinamo București
- 2024–: Al Rayyan
National team
- Years: Team
- –: Romania

Javier Humet Gaminde (born 20 January 1990) is a Spanish-born Romanian handball player who plays for Al Rayyan and the Romania national team.

== International honours ==
- EHF Cup Winners' Cup:
  - Semifinalist: 2011, 2012

== Personal life ==
In April 2017, Humet acquired Romanian citizenship and will be eligible to play officially for Romania.
