= Robert Weber (handballer) =

Austrian handball player (born 1985)

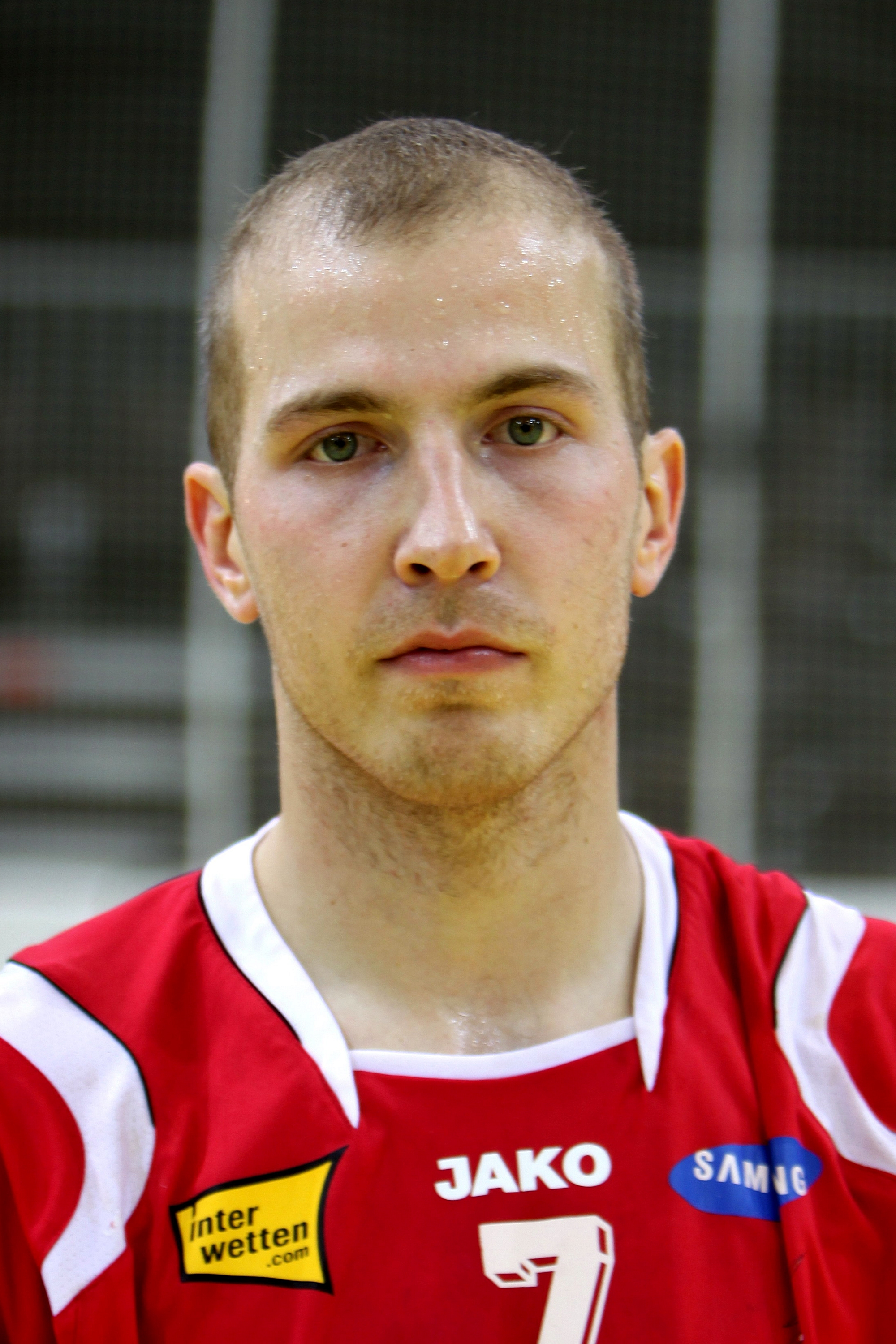

Personal information
- Nationality: Austrian
- Born: 25 November 1985 (age 40) Bregenz, Austria
- Height: 1.79 m (5 ft 10 in)

Sport
- Sport: Handball
- Position: Right wing
- Current club: HSG Bärnbach/Köflach
- Number: 73

Senior clubs
- Years: Team
- 2004–2008: Alpla HC Hard
- 2008–2009: HBW Balingen-Weilstetten
- 2009–2019: SC Magdeburg
- 2019–2022: HSG Nordhorn-Lingen
- 2022–2023: Olympiacos
- 2023: Füchse Berlin
- 2023–: HSG Bärnbach/Köflach
National team
Years	Team	Apps	(Gls)
2004–	Austria	213	(940)
- Updated on 22 January 2024

Robert Weber (born 25 November 1985) is an Austrian handball player for HSG Bärnbach/Köflach and the Austria men's national handball team. Weber has the third most caps ever for the Austrian national team (behind Patrick Fölser and Ewald Humenberger) and the second most goals scored (behind Andreas Dittert).

== Individual awards ==
- All-Star right wing of the European Championship: 2024
