= Pișchia =

- Commune
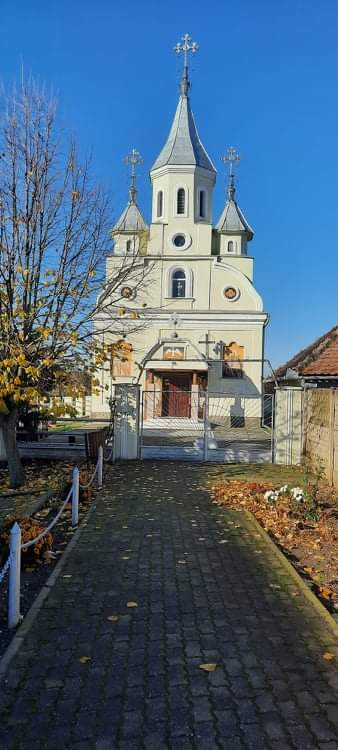
- The Orthodox church in Pișchia

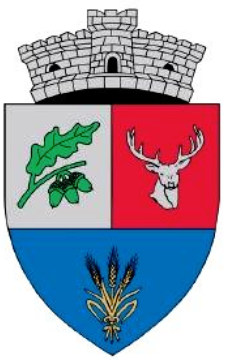
- Coat of arms

- Location in Timiș County

- Location in Romania
- Coordinates: 45°54′N 21°20′E
- Country: Romania
- County: Timiș

Government
  - Mayor (2024–): Andrei-Raul Obreja (PSD)
- Area: 123.6 km^{2} (47.7 sq mi)
- Population (2021-12-01): 3,167
  - Density: 25.62/km^{2} (66.36/sq mi)
- Time zone: UTC+02:00 (EET)
  - Summer (DST): UTC+03:00 (EEST)
- Postal code: 307325–307329
- Vehicle reg.: TM
- Website: www.comunapischia.ro

Pișchia (Hungarian: Hidasliget or Piski; German: Bruckenau; Serbian: Пишкија, romanized: Piškija) is a commune in Timiș County, Romania. It is composed of five villages: Bencecu de Jos, Bencecu de Sus, Murani, Pișchia (commune seat) and Sălciua Nouă.

== Geography ==
Pișchia is located in the north of Timiș County, 20 km (12 mi) north of Timișoara, in the contact area between Lipova Hills and Timis Plain. It covers an area of 123.6 ha (305 acres).

== History ==
The first mentions of Pișchia appear in the papal tithe records of 1333, in which it is said that the Catholic priest Johannes of Pisky paid 18 kreutzers to the Catholic church. The old village was further south of today's Pișchia, between the Beregsău River and the Roman walls. During the Turkish rule of Banat, the locality decays, because in Marsigli's notes from 1690–1700 he does not mention it. At the census made by the Austrians in 1717, immediately after their conquest of Banat, the locality called Peschkan had only eight houses left.

Shortly after the installation of the Austrian administration, under the leadership of Count Mercy, in 1724, the first colonization of Pișchia with Germans took place. It is the beginning of the colonizations of Banat and Pișchia enters the plan of Germanization of the chain of villages between Lipova and Timișoara, with strategic-military purpose. The colonization of 1724 took place under the guidance of Francis John Falk of Worms. Through Agent Bruckentheys, 121 German families from Trier, Alsace and Lorraine were brought here. The Germans settled near the old village, on the current hearth of Pișchia, and in time, the Romanians from the old village joined the German village, the old hearth being abandoned. The new village was named Bruckenau, in honor of the agent who intermediated the arrival of the Germans here.

In 1764, 92 families of German settlers from Alsace, Lorraine, Metz, Trier, Saarland, Palatinate and Luxembourg, bondsmen of the bishop of Trier, settled in Pișchia. The following year, 31 more families came from Saarland. The settlers were given a place to live, arable land and household tools, which they would redeem within three years and at low rates. In 1771 there was an epidemic of plague that killed 188 people. By the end of the 18th century, the settlement developed more and more, the Roman Catholic church was built and education was organized. Christian Crusius' Topographisches Post-Lexikon (1804) speaks of the locality, saying "Bruckenau which is also called Piskia, near Timișoara, not far from Giarmata, with hills and many vineyards, with mineral waters. It is a commune with a German parish".

In 1896 a private company built the Timișoara–Radna railway, which also passes through Pișchia, and the station was built in 1910. The forests within the village belonged to the royal estates and thus Pișchia was often visited by high dignitaries and even by kings.

During the interwar period, especially between 1922–1924, many poor German families from Pișchia emigrated to the United States, Canada, Argentina and Brazil. In 1945–1948, many Germans from Pișchia were deported to USSR, most of them returned, and some died there. In 1944–1945, about 70 Aromanian families from Southern Dobruja occupied by Bulgaria were settled in Pișchia. These families were placed in the nationalized homes of Germans who fought in the German army, were deported or were taken prisoner. At the agrarian reform of 1945, they received 5 ha (12 acres) of land each. But in 1951–1952, when the Bărăgan deportations took place, the Aromanians left Pișchia. Besides Aromanians, after the end of the war, the first families of Bessarabian refugees arrived in Pișchia, as well as the first families of Oltenians. Gradually, the number of Romanians increased. Between 1951–1952, 70 Romanian families from the village of Nadăș moved here. In the mid-1960s, the number of Romanians came to equal that of the Germans. But they gradually leave the village, and in 1990, after the opening of the borders, they leave in one last massive wave to Germany.

== Demographics ==
Ethnic composition (2021)
1. Romanians (85.7%)
2. Roma (1.95%)
3. Hungarians (1.04%)
4. Unknown (10.5%)
5. Others (0.78%)
Religious composition (2021)
1. Orthodox (78.5%)
2. Roman Catholics (2.62%)
3. Pentecostals (1.98%)
4. Unknown (15.0%)
5. Others (1.58%)
6. Irreligious, atheists and agnostics (0.37%)

Pișchia had a population of 3,167 inhabitants at the 2021 census, up 3.8% from the 2011 census. Most inhabitants are Romanians (85.72%), larger minorities being represented by Roma (1.95%) and Hungarians (1.04%). For 10.51% of the population, ethnicity is unknown. By religion, most inhabitants are Orthodox (78.49%), but there are also minorities of Roman Catholics (2.62%) and Pentecostals (1.98%). For 14.96% of the population, religious affiliation is unknown.

Census		Ethnic composition
Year	Population	Romanians	Hungarians	Germans	Roma	Ukrainians
1880	5,079	1,894	103	3,041	–	–
1890	5,505	1,977	148	3,277	–	–
1900	5,502	2,116	162	3,172	–	–
1910	5,315	2,216	218	2,847	–	–
1920	5,077	2,043	144	2,873	–	–
1930	5,032	2,225	132	2,601	58	–
1941	5,015	2,326	149	2,485	–	–
1956	4,475	2,403	170	1,871	17	–
1966	4,375	2,588	167	1,579	1	5
1977	3,956	2,616	130	1,052	46	93
1992	2,932	2,701	87	28	52	42
2002	3,006	2,805	66	18	56	40
2011	3,051	2,768	39	8	106	13
2021	3,167	2,715	33	7	62	7

== Politics and administration ==
The commune of Pișchia is administered by a mayor and a local council composed of 13 councilors. The mayor, Andrei-Raul Obreja, from the Social Democratic Party, has been in office since 2024. As from the 2024 local elections, the local council has the following composition by political parties:

Party	Seats	Composition
Social Democratic Party	7	
National Liberal Party	5	
Alliance for the Union of Romanians	1	

== Notable people ==
- Marius Munteanu (1920–2005), poet
- Ionel Iacob-Bencei (1940–2020), poet, prose writer and publicist
