= Ciprian Șandru =

Romanian handball player (born 1991)

Personal information
- Nationality: Romanian
- Born: 27 February 1991 (age 35) Sighișoara, Romania
- Height: 1.92 m (6 ft 4 in)

Sport
- Sport: Handball
- Position: Left back/ Centre Back
- Current club: Dinamo București

Senior clubs
- Years: Team
- –2013: Energia Târgu Jiu
- 2013–: Dinamo București
National team
- Years: Team
- –: Romania
Medal record
World University Championship
Gold medal – first place	2016 Spain	Team

Ciprian Șandru (born 27 February 1991) is a Romanian handballer who plays for Dinamo București and the Romania national team.
