= Mașloc =

- Commune
- Location in Timiș County

- Location in Romania
- Coordinates: 46°0′N 21°27′E
- Country: Romania
- County: Timiș

Government
  - Mayor (2016–): Ionel Lupu (PNL)
- Area: 72.06 km^{2} (27.82 sq mi)
- Population (2021-12-01): 2,236
  - Density: 31.03/km^{2} (80.37/sq mi)
- Time zone: UTC+02:00 (EET)
  - Summer (DST): UTC+03:00 (EEST)
- Postal code: 307270–307273
- Vehicle reg.: TM
- Website: www.comunamasloc.ro

Mașloc (German: Blumenthal; Hungarian: Máslak; Serbian: Машлок, romanized: Mašlok) is a commune in Timiș County, Romania. It is composed of three villages: Alioș, Mașloc (commune seat) and Remetea Mică. It also included Fibiș until 2004, when it was split off to form a separate commune.

== Name ==
The German name of the village, Blumenthal, means "village of flowers". The German colony was built in a wildflower meadow, hence the name. This is also illustrated by the old stamp of the village, depicting a valley and a flower vase with a lush bouquet of flowers. The Romanian population had great difficulties pronouncing the German name. Therefore they named the village Maslog, as shown in a map from 1864–1865. Maslog was written with "s" and not with the Romanian "ș" (s-comma). Maslog was changed to Mașloc, apparently taking over the ending "-loc" from the Hungarian "-lak" (Máslak). The Hungarian lak – just like the Romanian loc – means "place".

== History ==
Mașloc was first mentioned as Machalaka in 1326. Most of its inhabitants fled after the Turkish conquest of Banat (1552). From this time on, the houses were only temporarily inhabited by people of different nationalities. After the Austrians conquered Banat from the Turks, the village was called Maschlok and had 14 houses.

Mașloc was colonized by Germans from Schwarzwald between 1770–1771, who named it Blumenthal. By 1773, the colony had 93 houses, a school and a pub.

== Demographics ==
Ethnic composition (2021)
1. Romanians (73.6%)
2. Ukrainians (8.05%)
3. Roma (5.76%)
4. Hungarians (1.38%)
5. Unknown (10.6%)
6. Others (0.61%)
Religious composition (2021)
1. Orthodox (81.4%)
2. Pentecostals (2.01%)
3. Roman Catholics (2.01%)
4. Old Believers (1.65%)
5. Unknown (10.9%)
6. Others (1.41%)
7. Irreligious, atheists and agnostics (0.53%)

Mașloc had a population of 2,236 inhabitants at the 2021 census, down 2.14% from the 2011 census. Most inhabitants are Romanians (73.56%), larger minorities being represented by Ukrainians (8.05%), Roma (5.76%) and Hungarians (1.38%). For 10.64% of the population, ethnicity is unknown. By religion, most inhabitants are Orthodox (81.44%), but there are also minorities of Pentecostals (2.01%), Roman Catholics (2.01%) and Old Believers (1.65%). For 10.95% of the population, religious affiliation is unknown.

Census		Ethnic composition
Year	Population	Romanians	Hungarians	Germans	Roma	Ukrainians
1880	3,871	1,766	147	1,951	–	–
1890	4,175	1,781	162	2,195	–	–
1900	4,340	1,911	188	2,224	–	–
1910	4,007	1,575	127	2,303	–	–
1920	3,878	1,479	89	2,294	–	–
1930	3,714	1,467	63	2,157	13	–
1941	3,564	1,367	44	2,127	–	–
1956	3,277	–	–	–	–	–
1966	3,064	1,638	38	1,386	–	–
1977	2,899	1,593	31	1,066	14	190
1992	2,283	1,800	50	70	20	334
2002	2,307	1,886	38	21	83	271
2011	2,285	1,775	36	13	64	249
2021	2,236	1,645	31	10	129	180

== Politics and administration ==
The commune of Mașloc is administered by a mayor and a local council composed of 11 councilors. The mayor, Ionel Lupu, from the National Liberal Party, has been in office since 2016. As from the 2024 local elections, the local council has the following composition by political parties:

Party	Seats	Composition
National Liberal Party	4	
Alliance for the Union of Romanians	4	
Social Democratic Party	3	
