= Sânandrei =

- Commune
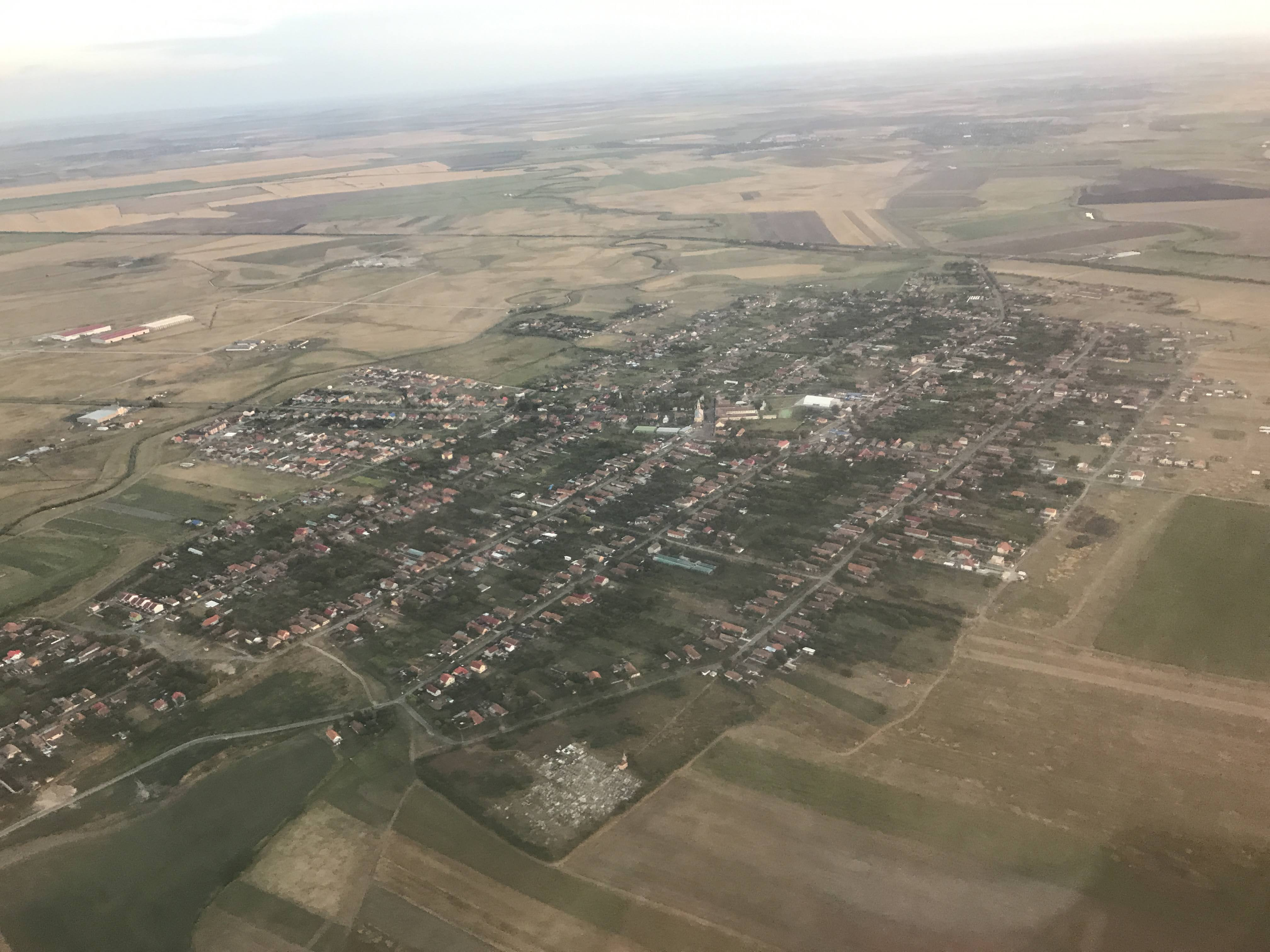
- Aerial view of Sânandrei

- Location in Timiș County

- Location in Romania
- Coordinates: 45°54′38″N 21°09′51″E
- Country: Romania
- County: Timiș

Government
  - Mayor (2012–): Claudiu-Florin Coman (PNL)
- Area: 96.84 km^{2} (37.39 sq mi)
- Elevation: 61 m (200 ft)
- Population (2021-12-01): 7,137
  - Density: 73.70/km^{2} (190.9/sq mi)
- Time zone: UTC+02:00 (EET)
  - Summer (DST): UTC+03:00 (EEST)
- Postal code: 307375–307377
- Vehicle reg.: TM
- Website: primariasanandrei.ro

Sânandrei (formerly Sântandraș; German: St. Andreas; Hungarian: Szentandrás; Serbian: Светандраш, romanized: Svetandraš) is a commune in Timiș County, Romania. It is composed of three villages: Carani, Covaci and Sânandrei (commune seat).

== Geography ==
Sânandrei is located in western Romania, in the south of the Western Plain, also known as the Tisa Plain, 12 km (7.5 mi) from Timișoara. The total area of Sânandrei commune, composed of the three villages of Sânandrei, Carani and Covaci, is 9,684.25 ha (23,930.3 acres), of which 444.25 ha (1,097.8 acres) is in the built-up area and 9,240 ha (22,800 acres) is outside the built-up area.

== History ==
=== Sânandrei ===
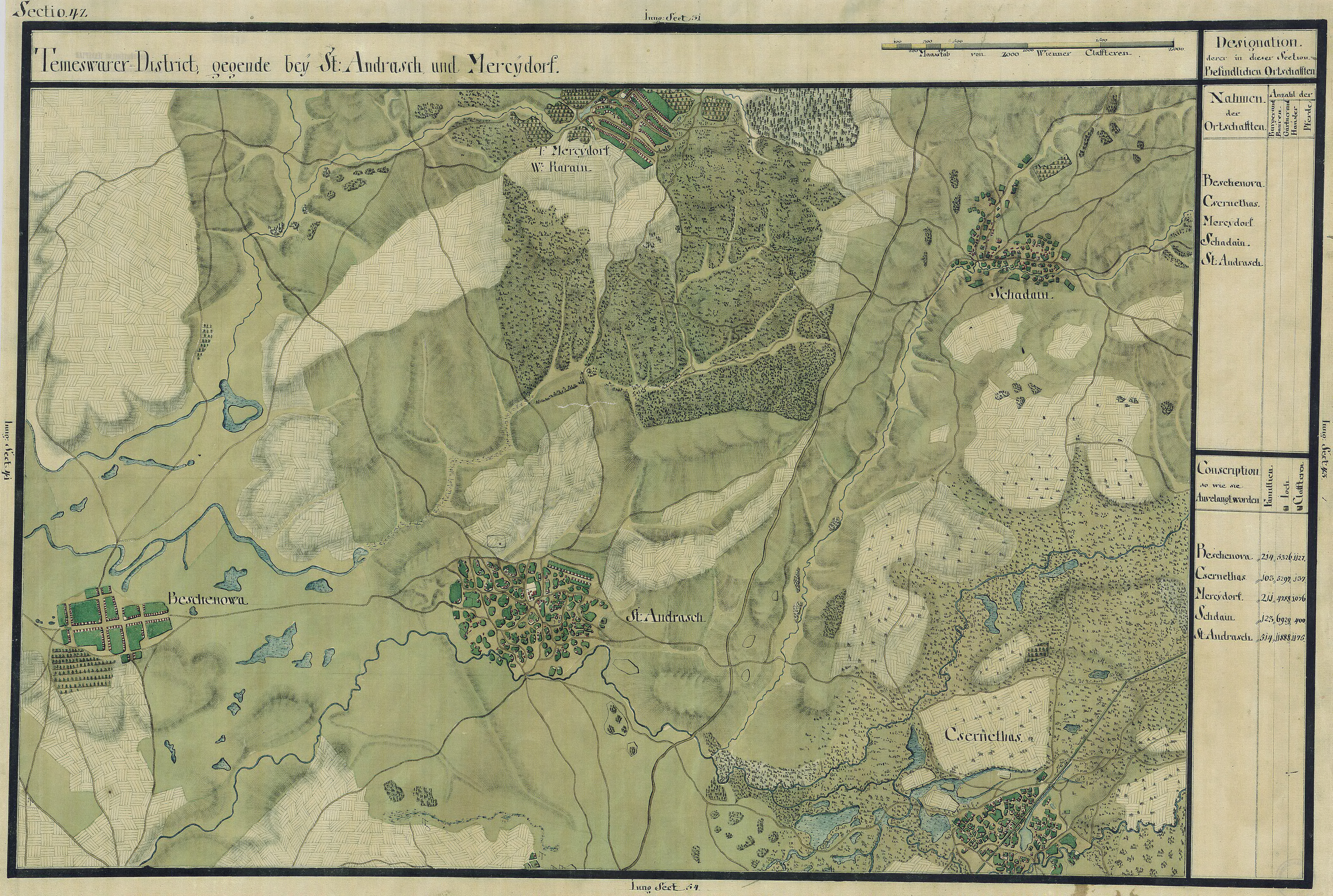
Sânandrei (St. Andrasch) on the Josephinische Landesaufnahme of 1769–1772

Sânandrei is one of the oldest settlements in Banat, whose first recorded mention dates from 1230, when it was owned by the chapter of Arad. In the medieval period it was a Romanian locality. In 1717 it had 23 houses and was called St. André. The first colonization of the village with Germans took place in 1748–1749. The second wave of colonization took place in 1766, when French people were brought in, and in 1772 the third wave of colonists settled, consisting of 42 German families. Thus, until the end of the 18th century, Sânandrei became a German locality, but the Romanians also remained an important community. In 1811 the Germans built the Roman Catholic church, and the Romanians built the Orthodox church in 1834.

In the interwar period it was part of Plasa Chișoda, Timiș-Torontal County and was a prosperous locality. After World War II, the number of Germans began to decline, and in the 1970s Romanians became the majority. After 1990, they left the village en masse to settle in Germany.

=== Carani ===
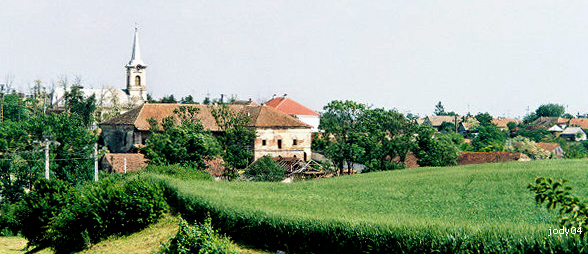
A 2007 panorama of Carani with Count Mercy's castle and the Roman Catholic church in the foreground

Carani was built in 1735 by Italian colonists brought by the Habsburg monarchy as part of a massive effort to populate Banat with Western Europeans. It was one of the first villages for colonists, founded and inhabited exclusively by Italians, being the only majority-Italian settlement in the entire Banat. The inhabitants grew silkworms, having been brought there in order to start silkworm production in Banat.

The village was founded under the name of Mercydorf ("Mercy's village"), in honour of General Claude Florimond de Mercy, who was charged with administering Banat. Later, new waves of colonists arrived – French people and Germans from Alsace-Lorraine. The first came around 1752, then in 1763, so that by 1770 the village was substantially French in character. Religious services were held in three languages: Italian, French and German. However, with time, the village grew more German, in line with the rest of Banat. By the end of the 18th century, Carani was already a Banat Swabian village.

=== Covaci ===
Covaci was founded in 1843 when German and a few Hungarian settlers were brought to an estate there. By 1890 it was a commune seat with 955 inhabitants and was part of Temes County, Timișoara District. The Catholic church was built between 1895 and 1898 and was blessed on 30 November 1898. Until the latter half of the 20th century, the village had a strong German majority. This changed dramatically due to emigration, so that by 2002, of 751 inhabitants, only 19 were Germans.

== Demographics ==
Ethnic composition (2021)
1. Romanians (80.2%)
2. Hungarians (1.33%)
3. Unknown (16.2%)
4. Others (2.19%)
Religious composition (2021)
1. Orthodox (67.5%)
2. Roman Catholics (4.09%)
3. Pentecostals (2.74%)
4. Greek Catholics (2.53%)
5. Jehovah's Witnesses (1.07%)
6. Baptists (1.00%)
7. Unknown (17.6%)
8. Others (2.16%)
9. Irreligious, atheists and agnostics (1.26%)

Sânandrei had a population of 7,137 inhabitants at the 2021 census, up 24.83% from the 2011 census. Most inhabitants are Romanians (80.25%), with a minority of Hungarians (1.33%). For 16.23% of the population, ethnicity is unknown. By religion, most inhabitants are Orthodox (67.54%), but there are also minorities of Roman Catholics (4.09%), Pentecostals (2.74%), Greek Catholics (2.53%), Jehovah's Witnesses (1.07%) and Baptists (1%). For 17.61% of the population, religious affiliation is unknown.

| Census | | Ethnic composition |
| Year | Population | Romanians | Hungarians | Germans | Roma |
|---|---|---|---|---|---|
| 1880 | 5,287 | 536 | 70 | 4,652 | – |
| 1890 | 5,955 | 488 | 159 | 5,289 | – |
| 1900 | 5,807 | 482 | 160 | 5,128 | – |
| 1910 | 5,175 | 565 | 196 | 4,392 | – |
| 1920 | 5,180 | 453 | 109 | 4,596 | – |
| 1930 | 4,871 | 519 | 163 | 4,067 | 110 |
| 1941 | 5,003 | 633 | 121 | 4,068 | – |
| 1956 | 5,024 | 1,654 | 128 | 3,223 | – |
| 1966 | 5,511 | 2,311 | 126 | 3,042 | – |
| 1977 | 6,080 | 3,226 | 155 | 2,658 | 10 |
| 1992 | 4,773 | 4,154 | 139 | 294 | 75 |
| 2002 | 5,371 | 4,953 | 141 | 148 | 25 |
| 2011 | 5,717 | 5,014 | 94 | 64 | 26 |
| 2021 | 7,137 | 5,728 | 95 | 58 | 41 |

== Politics and administration ==
The commune of Sânandrei is administered by a mayor and a local council composed of 15 councilors. The mayor, Claudiu-Florin Coman, from the National Liberal Party, has been in office since 2012. As from the 2024 local elections, the local council has the following composition by political parties:

| Party | Seats | Composition |
|---|---|---|
| National Liberal Party | 5 | |
| Alliance for the Union of Romanians | 5 | |
| Save Romania Union–People's Movement Party–Force of the Right | 3 | |
| Social Democratic Party | 2 | |

== Economy ==
South of Sânandrei, Banat Business Park is being developed on an 80-hectare site, currently boasting an occupancy rate of 50%. Among its tenants are B. Braun's infusion solutions factory, Habasit (specializing in conveyor and transmission belts), Max Struktur (metal constructions), Borghesi (construction and real estate development), along with several other companies.
