= 2024 European Men's Handball Championship squads =

This article displays the squads for the 2024 European Men's Handball Championship. Each team consists of up to 20 players, of whom 16 may be fielded for each match.

Age, club, caps and goals as of 10 January 2024.

== Group A ==
=== France ===
A 20-player squad was announced on 23 December 2023. The roster was reduced to 19 players on 6 January.

Head coach: Guillaume Gille

| No. | Pos. | Name | Date of birth (age) | Height | App. | Goals | Club |
|---|---|---|---|---|---|---|---|
| 1 | GK | Samir Bellahcene | 20 February 1995 (aged 28) | 1.91 m | 4 | 1 | (Germany) THW Kiel |
| 2 | RW | Yanis Lenne | 29 June 1996 (aged 27) | 1.87 m | 47 | 91 | (France) Montpellier Handball |
| 5 | CB | Nedim Remili | 18 July 1995 (aged 28) | 1.95 m | 115 | 352 | (Hungary) Telekom Veszprém |
| 8 | LB | Elohim Prandi | 24 August 1998 (aged 25) | 1.93 m | 28 | 63 | (France) Paris Saint-Germain |
| 9 | RB | Melvyn Richardson | 31 January 1997 (aged 26) | 1.90 m | 76 | 183 | (Spain) FC Barcelona |
| 10 | RB | Dika Mem | 31 August 1997 (aged 26) | 1.94 m | 106 | 340 | (Spain) FC Barcelona |
| 11 | P | Nicolas Tournat | 5 April 1994 (aged 29) | 2.00 m | 86 | 190 | (Poland) Industria Kielce |
| 13 | LB | Nikola Karabatić | 11 April 1984 (aged 39) | 1.96 m | 348 | 1277 | (France) Paris Saint-Germain |
| 14 | CB | Kentin Mahé | 22 May 1991 (aged 32) | 1.86 m | 162 | 530 | (Hungary) Telekom Veszprém |
| 16 | GK | Charles Bolzinger | 14 December 2000 (aged 23) | 1.98 m | 9 | 1 | (France) Montpellier Handball |
| 17 | LB | Timothey N'Guessan | 18 September 1992 (aged 31) | 1.95 m | 108 | 216 | (Spain) FC Barcelona |
| 22 | P | Luka Karabatic | 19 April 1988 (aged 35) | 2.02 m | 144 | 168 | (France) Paris Saint-Germain |
| 23 | P | Ludovic Fabregas | 1 July 1996 (aged 27) | 1.98 m | 129 | 296 | (Hungary) Telekom Veszprém |
| 25 | LW | Hugo Descat | 16 August 1992 (aged 31) | 1.83 m | 46 | 200 | (Hungary) Telekom Veszprém |
| 28 | RW | Valentin Porte | 7 September 1990 (aged 33) | 1.90 m | 182 | 415 | (France) Montpellier Handball |
| 29 | RW | Benoît Kounkoud | 19 February 1997 (aged 26) | 1.90 m | 39 | 58 | (Poland) Industria Kielce |
| 31 | LW | Dylan Nahi | 30 November 1999 (aged 24) | 1.92 m | 45 | 118 | (Poland) Industria Kielce |
| 34 | P | Karl Konan | 3 June 1995 (aged 28) | 1.96 m | 23 | 5 | (France) Montpellier Handball |
| 92 | GK | Rémi Desbonnet | 28 February 1992 (aged 31) | 1.82 m | 29 | 2 | (France) Montpellier Handball |

=== Germany ===
A 19-player squad was announced on 21 December 2023. Marian Michalczik had to withdraw due to an injury on 29 December. On 6 January 2024, Patrick Groetzki withdrew because of an injury.

Head coach: (Iceland) Alfreð Gíslason

| No. | Pos. | Name | Date of birth (age) | Height | App. | Goals | Club |
|---|---|---|---|---|---|---|---|
| 1 | GK | David Späth | 29 April 2002 (aged 21) | 1.97 m | 4 | 0 | (Germany) Rhein-Neckar Löwen |
| 3 | CB | Nils Lichtlein | 31 July 2002 (aged 21) | 1.83 m | 4 | 2 | (Germany) Füchse Berlin |
| 4 | P | Johannes Golla | 5 November 1997 (aged 26) | 1.95 m | 67 | 231 | (Germany) SG Flensburg-Handewitt |
| 11 | LB | Sebastian Heymann | 1 March 1998 (aged 25) | 1.98 m | 21 | 34 | (Germany) Frisch Auf Göppingen |
| 14 | P | Justus Fischer | 6 February 2003 (aged 20) | 1.93 m | 4 | 3 | (Germany) TSV Hannover-Burgdorf |
| 15 | CB | Juri Knorr | 9 May 2000 (aged 23) | 1.92 m | 45 | 179 | (Germany) Rhein-Neckar Löwen |
| 17 | RW | Lukas Zerbe | 17 January 1996 (aged 27) | 1.84 m | 24 | 29 | (Germany) TBV Lemgo |
| 18 | LB | Julian Köster | 16 March 2000 (aged 23) | 2.00 m | 34 | 61 | (Germany) VfL Gummersbach |
| 20 | CB | Philipp Weber | 15 September 1992 (aged 31) | 1.94 m | 78 | 172 | (Germany) SC Magdeburg |
| 23 | RB | Renars Uščins | 29 April 2002 (aged 21) | 1.89 m | 6 | 10 | (Germany) TSV Hannover-Burgdorf |
| 25 | RB | Kai Häfner | 10 July 1989 (aged 34) | 1.92 m | 137 | 329 | (Germany) TVB Stuttgart |
| 28 | LW | Tim Nothdurft | 11 July 1997 (aged 26) | 1.94 m | 2 | 1 | (Germany) Bergischer HC |
| 33 | GK | Andreas Wolff | 3 March 1991 (aged 32) | 1.98 m | 145 | 14 | (Poland) Industria Kielce |
| 34 | LW | Rune Dahmke | 10 April 1993 (aged 30) | 1.89 m | 59 | 94 | (Germany) THW Kiel |
| 36 | LW | Lukas Mertens | 22 March 1996 (aged 27) | 1.82 m | 31 | 77 | (Germany) SC Magdeburg |
| 38 | LB | Martin Hanne | 12 May 2001 (aged 22) | 1.93 m | 2 | 5 | (Germany) TSV Hannover-Burgdorf |
| 44 | RB | Christoph Steinert | 18 January 1990 (aged 33) | 1.96 m | 32 | 68 | (Germany) HC Erlangen |
| 73 | RW | Timo Kastening | 25 June 1995 (aged 28) | 1.80 m | 49 | 182 | (Germany) MT Melsungen |
| 80 | P | Jannik Kohlbacher | 19 July 1995 (aged 28) | 1.93 m | 99 | 202 | (Germany) Rhein-Neckar Löwen |

=== North Macedonia ===
A 19-player squad was announced on 15 December 2023.

Head coach: Kiril Lazarov

| No. | Pos. | Name | Date of birth (age) | Height | App. | Goals | Club |
|---|---|---|---|---|---|---|---|
| 1 | GK | Nikola Mitrevski | 3 October 1985 (aged 38) | 1.84 m | 34 | 7 | (Portugal) FC Porto |
| 2 | LB | Edvin Omeragikj | 9 October 2002 (aged 21) | 1.96 m | 0 | 0 | (North Macedonia) RK Alkaloid |
| 4 | RB | Martin Velkovski | 10 March 1997 (aged 26) | 1.88 m | 34 | 9 | (North Macedonia) RK Alkaloid |
| 9 | CB | Igor Gjorgiev | 2 June 2000 (aged 23) | 1.87 m | 16 | 27 | (North Macedonia) RK Alkaloid |
| 10 | CB | Marko Mitev | 23 February 2003 (aged 20) | 1.81 m | 4 | 7 | (North Macedonia) RK Alkaloid |
| 11 | LB | Filip Taleski | 28 March 1996 (aged 27) | 2.00 m | 64 | 164 | (Portugal) SL Benfica |
| 12 | GK | Martin Tomovski | 10 July 1997 (aged 26) | 1.94 m | 26 | 0 | (North Macedonia) RK Vardar 1961 |
| 17 | P | Nikola Markoski | 22 May 1990 (aged 33) | 1.98 m | 70 | 24 | (North Macedonia) RK Alkaloid |
| 18 | CB | Filip Kuzmanovski | 7 July 1996 (aged 27) | 1.98 m | 63 | 124 | (North Macedonia) RK Eurofarm Pelister |
| 19 | RW | Nenad Kosteski | 3 April 2001 (aged 22) | 1.89 m | 15 | 34 | (North Macedonia) RK Eurofarm Pelister |
| 20 | GK | Marko Kizikj | 22 January 2001 (aged 22) | 1.98 m | 2 | 0 | (North Macedonia) RK Eurofarm Pelister |
| 26 | RW | Nikola Kosteski | 22 August 1992 (aged 31) | 1.83 m | 0 | 0 | (Czech Republic) Talent Plzeň |
| 33 | P | Žarko Peševski | 11 April 1991 (aged 32) | 1.95 m | 68 | 112 | (North Macedonia) RK Eurofarm Pelister |
| 34 | RB | Tomislav Jagurinovski | 19 August 1998 (aged 25) | 1.88 m | 9 | 5 | (North Macedonia) RK Vardar 1961 |
| 36 | P | Milan Lazarevski | 9 February 1997 (aged 26) | 1.93 m | 0 | 0 | (North Macedonia) RK Vardar 1961 |
| 38 | LB | Ivan Džonov | 15 July 1997 (aged 26) | 1.91 m | 10 | 13 | (North Macedonia) RK Alkaloid |
| 55 | LW | Petar Atanasijevikj | 9 July 2003 (aged 20) | 1.92 m | 7 | 14 | (North Macedonia) RK Eurofarm Pelister |
| 79 | RB | David Savrevski | 16 June 2002 (aged 21) | 1.95 m | 5 | 5 | (North Macedonia) RK Alkaloid |

=== Switzerland ===
A 20-player squad was announced on 14 December 2023. On 22 December, Samuel Röthlisberger had to withdraw due to an injury. The roster was further reduced to 18 players on 28 December. Jonas Schelker withdrew because of an injury on 7 January 2024.

Head coach: Michael Suter

| No. | Pos. | Name | Date of birth (age) | Height | App. | Goals | Club |
|---|---|---|---|---|---|---|---|
| 2 | CB | Andy Schmid | 30 August 1983 (aged 40) | 1.90 m | 215 | 1075 | (Switzerland) HC Kriens-Luzern |
| 3 | P | Lucas Meister | 16 August 1996 (aged 27) | 1.97 m | 79 | 193 | (Germany) SC Magdeburg |
| 4 | LB | Lenny Rubin | 1 February 1996 (aged 27) | 2.05 m | 69 | 253 | (Germany) HSG Wetzlar |
| 6 | RW | Cédrie Tynowski | 21 September 1996 (aged 27) | 1.85 m | 52 | 110 | (Switzerland) Pfadi Winterthur |
| 8 | LB | Manuel Zehnder | 24 October 1999 (aged 24) | 1.90 m | 19 | 81 | (Germany) ThSV Eisenach |
| 9 | LW | Marvin Lier | 8 September 1992 (aged 31) | 1.86 m | 102 | 250 | (Switzerland) Kadetten Schaffhausen |
| 12 | GK | Leonard Grazioli | 19 January 2001 (aged 22) | 1.93 m | 29 | 1 | (Germany) HSG Wetzlar |
| 13 | RB | Michael Kusio | 31 August 1998 (aged 25) | 1.95 m | 9 | 5 | (Switzerland) BSV Bern |
| 15 | RB | Nicolas Raemy | 25 February 1992 (aged 31) | 1.85 m | 84 | 232 | (Switzerland) Wacker Thun |
| 16 | GK | Nikola Portner | 19 November 1993 (aged 30) | 1.94 m | 126 | 27 | (Germany) SC Magdeburg |
| 19 | CB | Zoran Markovic | 6 May 1995 (aged 28) | 1.97 m | 31 | 43 | (Switzerland) Kadetten Schaffhausen |
| 20 | LB | Luka Maros | 20 March 1994 (aged 29) | 1.96 m | 64 | 134 | (Switzerland) Kadetten Schaffhausen |
| 21 | RW | Gino Steenaerts | 5 May 2005 (aged 18) | 1.84 m | 0 | 0 | (Switzerland) HC Kriens-Luzern |
| 23 | P | Lukas Laube | 22 April 2000 (aged 23) | 1.93 m | 21 | 49 | (Germany) TVB Stuttgart |
| 27 | RW | Maximilian Gerbl | 25 June 1995 (aged 28) | 1.78 m | 60 | 95 | (Germany) TSV Hannover-Burgdorf |
| 29 | LW | Samuel Zehnder | 29 February 2000 (aged 23) | 1.83 m | 44 | 85 | (Germany) TBV Lemgo |
| 30 | P | Joël Willecke | 23 November 2003 (aged 20) | 2.02 m | 15 | 3 | (Switzerland) HSC Suhr Aarau |
| 31 | GK | Aurel Bringolf | 2 November 1987 (aged 36) | 1.90 m | 82 | 2 | (Switzerland) BSV Bern |
| 41 | CB | Felix Aellen | 11 October 2003 (aged 20) | 1.87 m | 6 | 6 | (Switzerland) BSV Bern |
| 44 | CB | Mehdi Ben Romdhane | 2 December 2001 (aged 22) | 1.88 m | 24 | 24 | (Switzerland) Kadetten Schaffhausen |

== Group B ==
=== Austria ===
A 17-player squad was announced on 17 December 2023.

Head coach: (Slovenia) Ales Pajovic

| No. | Pos. | Name | Date of birth (age) | Height | App. | Goals | Club |
|---|---|---|---|---|---|---|---|
| 6 | LB | Markus Mahr | 3 November 2000 (aged 23) | 1.89 m | 6 | 5 | (Austria) Bregenz Handball |
| 7 | RB | Janko Božović | 14 July 1985 (aged 38) | 2.04 m | 180 | 502 | (Kuwait) Al-Sulaibikhat |
| 20 | LW | Sebastian Frimmel | 18 December 1995 (aged 28) | 1.90 m | 98 | 323 | (Hungary) OTP Bank-Pick Szeged |
| 23 | LB | Nemanja Beloš | 8 June 1994 (aged 29) | 1.92 m | 3 | 0 | (Austria) HSG Graz |
| 26 | P | Lukas Herburger | 19 December 1994 (aged 29) | 1.97 m | 65 | 53 | (Switzerland) Kadetten Schaffhausen |
| 28 | RW | Robert Weber | 25 November 1985 (aged 38) | 1.79 m | 216 | 945 | (Austria) HSG Bärnbach/Köflach |
| 29 | P | Lukas Schweighofer | 29 December 1992 (aged 31) | 1.91 m | 11 | 4 | (Austria) HSG Graz |
| 30 | RB | Boris Zivkovic | 2 May 1992 (aged 31) | 1.95 m | 63 | 128 | (Poland) KS Azoty-Puławy |
| 34 | LB | Moritz Mittendorfer | 21 October 1996 (aged 27) | 1.93 m | 18 | 10 | (Austria) Union Krems |
| 39 | GK | Ralf Patrick Häusle | 30 December 1994 (aged 29) | 1.89 m | 16 | 0 | (Austria) Bregenz Handball |
| 40 | GK | Thomas Eichberger | 20 August 1993 (aged 30) | 1.95 m | 34 | 2 | (Austria) Union Krems |
| 45 | LW | Eric Damböck | 6 September 1999 (aged 24) | 1.81 m | 27 | 29 | (Austria) Fivers Margareten |
| 53 | LB | Nikola Bilyk | 28 November 1996 (aged 27) | 1.98 m | 98 | 435 | (Germany) THW Kiel |
| 55 | P | Tobias Wagner | 26 March 1995 (aged 28) | 1.98 m | 93 | 234 | (Austria) Bregenz Handball |
| 57 | RW | Jakob Nigg | 6 May 2003 (aged 20) | 1.84 m | 6 | 7 | (Austria) Fivers Margareten |
| 66 | CB | Elias Kofler | 9 August 2000 (aged 23) | 1.87 m | 17 | 7 | (Germany) 1. VfL Potsdam |
| 72 | CB | Lukas Hutecek | 2 July 2000 (aged 23) | 1.89 m | 42 | 146 | (Germany) TBV Lemgo |
| 97 | RB | Michael Miskovez | 29 August 1997 (aged 26) | 1.97 m | 20 | 4 | (Austria) Handball Tirol |
| 98 | GK | Constantin Möstl | 1 April 2000 (aged 23) | 1.86 m | 17 | 0 | (Austria) Alpla HC Hard |

=== Croatia ===
A 23-player squad was announced on 22 December 2023. It was cut to 21 on 30 December. On 9 January 2024, the roster was made of 19 players.

Head coach: Goran Perkovac

| No. | Pos. | Name | Date of birth (age) | Height | App. | Goals | Club |
|---|---|---|---|---|---|---|---|
| 1 | GK | Dominik Kuzmanović | 15 August 2002 (aged 21) | 1.91 m | 12 | 0 | (Croatia) RK Nexe Našice |
| 2 | LW | Lovro Mihić | 25 August 1994 (aged 29) | 1.81 m | 50 | 72 | (Poland) Orlen Wisła Płock |
| 5 | CB | Domagoj Duvnjak | 1 June 1988 (aged 35) | 1.98 m | 244 | 751 | (Germany) THW Kiel |
| 6 | RW | Mario Šoštarič | 25 November 1992 (aged 31) | 1.93 m | 6 | 19 | (Hungary) OTP Bank-Pick Szeged |
| 12 | GK | Matej Mandić | 2 May 2002 (aged 21) | 2.04 m | 10 | 0 | (Croatia) RK Zagreb |
| 16 | GK | Filip Ivić | 30 August 1992 (aged 31) | 1.95 m | 52 | 1 | (France) Chambéry Savoie MHB |
| 18 | CB | Igor Karačić | 2 November 1988 (aged 35) | 1.91 m | 110 | 278 | (Poland) Industria Kielce |
| 20 | RB | Mateo Maraš | 17 December 2000 (aged 23) | 2.03 m | 14 | 24 | (Hungary) Tatabánya KC |
| 21 | P | Veron Načinović | 7 March 2000 (aged 23) | 2.04 m | 17 | 31 | (France) Montpellier Handball |
| 25 | P | Tomislav Kušan | 16 December 1994 (aged 29) | 2.00 m | 5 | 7 | (France) Limoges Handball |
| 30 | LB | Marko Mamić | 6 March 1994 (aged 29) | 2.02 m | 79 | 123 | (Germany) SC DHfK Leipzig |
| 33 | CB | Luka Cindrić | 5 July 1993 (aged 30) | 1.81 m | 99 | 292 | (Romania) Dinamo București |
| 36 | GK | Kristian Pilipović | 10 December 1994 (aged 29) | 1.91 m | 4 | 0 | (Switzerland) Kadetten Schaffhausen |
| 41 | CB | Tin Lučin | 16 August 1999 (aged 24) | 1.96 m | 23 | 66 | (Poland) Orlen Wisła Płock |
| 51 | RB | Ivan Martinović | 6 January 1998 (aged 26) | 1.94 m | 36 | 154 | (Germany) MT Melsungen |
| 53 | P | Marin Šipić | 29 April 1996 (aged 27) | 1.90 m | 57 | 117 | (Switzerland) HC Kriens-Luzern |
| 57 | RW | Filip Glavaš | 6 May 1997 (aged 26) | 1.84 m | 28 | 96 | (Croatia) RK Zagreb |
| 58 | LB | Zvonimir Srna | 18 January 1998 (aged 25) | 2.02 m | 16 | 23 | (Croatia) RK Zagreb |
| 59 | RB | Luka Lovre Klarica | 25 September 2001 (aged 22) | 1.98 m | 11 | 19 | (Croatia) RK Zagreb |
| 62 | LW | Marin Jelinić | 7 December 1996 (aged 27) | 1.94 m | 25 | 64 | (Hungary) OTP Bank-Pick Szeged |

=== Romania ===
A 20-player squad was announced on 28 December 2023.

Head coach: (Spain) Xavier Pascual Fuertes

| No. | Pos. | Name | Date of birth (age) | Height | App. | Goals | Club |
|---|---|---|---|---|---|---|---|
| 1 | GK | Ionuț Iancu | 18 February 1994 (aged 29) | 1.94 m | 81 | 6 | (Romania) Steaua București |
| 3 | LB | Gabriel Ilie | 11 March 1999 (aged 24) | 1.93 m | 17 | 15 | (Romania) CSM Constanța |
| 4 | P | Daniel Stanciuc | 7 March 2004 (aged 19) | 1.89 m | 13 | 22 | (Romania) Dinamo București |
| 5 | RW | Ionuț Nistor | 24 May 1994 (aged 29) | 1.87 m | 40 | 68 | (Romania) CSM Constanța |
| 8 | LB | Robert Militaru | 4 January 1994 (aged 30) | 1.96 m | 29 | 6 | (Romania) Dinamo București |
| 10 | CB | Gabriel Cumpănici | 12 October 1998 (aged 25) | 1.98 m | 17 | 24 | (Romania) CS Minaur Baia Mare |
| 11 | P | Robert Nagy | 6 July 1997 (aged 26) | 1.92 m | 11 | 16 | (Romania) CS Minaur Baia Mare |
| 12 | GK | Dan Vasile | 9 July 1997 (aged 26) | 1.90 m | 40 | 2 | (Romania) CSM Constanța |
| 13 | P | Adrian Rotaru | 1 July 1994 (aged 29) | 1.91 m | 41 | 59 | (Romania) CSM București |
| 14 | RB | Demis Grigoraș | 30 June 1993 (aged 30) | 1.93 m | 71 | 120 | (Portugal) SL Benfica |
| 17 | LB | Dan Racoțea | 21 July 1995 (aged 28) | 2.03 m | 53 | 74 | (Romania) Dinamo București |
| 18 | RW | Marius Sadoveac | 7 May 1985 (aged 38) | 1.93 m | 134 | 191 | (Romania) SCM Politehnica Timișoara |
| 19 | RW | Alex Tărâță | 19 January 1990 (aged 33) | 1.88 m | 16 | 35 | (Romania) Steaua București |
| 21 | CB | Liviu Caba | 21 June 2000 (aged 23) | 1.95 m | 8 | 6 | (Romania) CSM Constanța |
| 22 | LW | Sabin Constantina | 22 July 1996 (aged 27) | 1.86 m | 8 | 14 | (Romania) Steaua București |
| 23 | P | Călin Dedu | 21 October 2002 (aged 21) | 2.07 m | 13 | 26 | (Romania) Dinamo București |
| 24 | LW | Andrei Nicușor Negru | 24 May 1994 (aged 29) | 1.80 m | 43 | 102 | (Romania) Dinamo București |
| 30 | CB | Andrei Drăgan | 6 July 1999 (aged 24) | 1.85 m | 11 | 10 | (Romania) CSM Constanța |
| 31 | RB | Radu Ghiță | 22 November 1990 (aged 33) | 1.89 m | 74 | 92 | (Romania) AHC Potaissa Turda |
| 35 | LB | Andrei Buzle | 3 May 1999 (aged 24) | 1.98 m | 30 | 45 | (Spain) BM Granollers |

=== Spain ===
A 20-player squad was announced on 18 December 2023. It was reduced to 18 players on 30 December. On 13 January Viran Morros replaced Miguel Sánchez-Migallón due to an injury.

Head coach: Jordi Ribera

| No. | Pos. | Name | Date of birth (age) | Height | App. | Goals | Club |
|---|---|---|---|---|---|---|---|
| 1 | GK | Gonzalo Pérez de Vargas | 10 January 1991 (aged 33) | 1.88 m | 173 | 18 | (Spain) FC Barcelona |
| 4 | P | Iñaki Peciña | 31 May 1988 (aged 35) | 2.00 m | 57 | 26 | (France) Chambéry Savoie MHB |
| 5 | RB | Jorge Maqueda | 6 February 1988 (aged 35) | 1.97 m | 198 | 492 | (France) HBC Nantes |
| 6 | LW | Ángel Fernández Pérez | 16 September 1988 (aged 35) | 1.92 m | 121 | 356 | (France) Limoges Handball |
| 10 | RB | Alex Dujshebaev | 17 December 1992 (aged 31) | 1.88 m | 146 | 429 | (Poland) Industria Kielce |
| 17 | P | Adrià Figueras | 31 August 1988 (aged 35) | 1.92 m | 127 | 340 | (France) C' Chartres MHB |
| 18 | RB | Imanol Garciandia | 30 April 1995 (aged 28) | 2.03 m | 44 | 111 | (Hungary) OTP Bank-Pick Szeged |
| 20 | P | Abel Serdio | 16 April 1994 (aged 29) | 1.95 m | 35 | 75 | (Poland) Orlen Wisła Płock |
| 21 | LB | Joan Cañellas | 30 September 1986 (aged 37) | 1.98 m | 230 | 554 | (Switzerland) Kadetten Schaffhausen |
| 24 | LB | Viran Morros | 15 December 1983 (aged 40) | 1.99 m | 252 | 169 | (Switzerland) Pfadi Winterthur |
| 25 | LB | Agustín Casado | 21 May 1996 (aged 27) | 1.93 m | 40 | 105 | (Hungary) Telekom Veszprém |
| 28 | RW | Aleix Gómez | 7 May 1997 (aged 26) | 1.83 m | 78 | 289 | (Spain) FC Barcelona |
| 36 | CB | Ian Tarrafeta | 4 January 1999 (aged 25) | 1.88 m | 39 | 81 | (France) Pays d'Aix UC |
| 51 | LW | Miguel Sánchez-Migallón | 8 February 1995 (aged 28) | 2.00 m | 48 | 31 | (Portugal) SL Benfica |
| 59 | LB | Daniel Dujshebaev | 4 July 1997 (aged 26) | 1.96 m | 82 | 181 | (Poland) Industria Kielce |
| 61 | GK | Sergey Hernández | 17 June 1995 (aged 28) | 1.98 m | 51 | 10 | (Germany) SC Magdeburg |
| 62 | RW | Kauldi Odriozola | 7 January 1997 (aged 27) | 1.83 m | 58 | 168 | (France) HBC Nantes |
| 70 | LW | Daniel Fernández | 28 March 2001 (aged 22) | 1.76 m | 30 | 93 | (Germany) TVB Stuttgart |
| 77 | CB | Jan Gurri | 10 June 2002 (aged 21) | 1.90 m | 8 | 9 | (Portugal) Sporting CP |

== Group C ==
=== Hungary ===
A 25-player squad was announced on 1 December 2023. It was cut to 20 on 28 December.

Head coach: (Spain) Chema Rodríguez

| No. | Pos. | Name | Date of birth (age) | Height | App. | Goals | Club |
|---|---|---|---|---|---|---|---|
| 1 | GK | Arián Andó | 29 January 1999 (aged 24) | 1.89 m | 8 | 0 | (Hungary) Balatonfüredi KSE |
| 2 | P | Adrián Sipos | 8 March 1990 (aged 33) | 1.98 m | 66 | 28 | (Germany) MT Melsungen |
| 7 | LW | Bendegúz Bóka | 2 October 1993 (aged 30) | 1.94 m | 70 | 176 | (Hungary) Balatonfüredi KSE |
| 10 | RW | Zsolt Krakovszki | 9 July 2002 (aged 21) | 1.88 m | 7 | 14 | (Hungary) NEKA |
| 11 | LB | Patrik Ligetvári | 13 February 1996 (aged 27) | 2.05 m | 85 | 86 | (Hungary) Telekom Veszprém |
| 18 | LW | Bence Krakovszki | 9 July 2002 (aged 21) | 1.87 m | 7 | 14 | (Hungary) Tatabánya KC |
| 23 | RB | Dominik Máthé | 1 April 1999 (aged 24) | 2.01 m | 40 | 142 | (France) Paris Saint-Germain |
| 24 | CB | Gergő Fazekas | 31 October 2003 (aged 20) | 1.91 m | 11 | 11 | (Poland) Orlen Wisła Płock |
| 27 | P | Bence Bánhidi | 9 February 1995 (aged 28) | 2.07 m | 97 | 286 | (Hungary) OTP Bank-Pick Szeged |
| 28 | P | Szabolcs Szöllősi | 28 January 1989 (aged 34) | 1.94 m | 98 | 119 | (Hungary) Dabas KK |
| 30 | LB | Zoltán Szita | 10 February 1998 (aged 25) | 1.96 m | 61 | 142 | (Hungary) OTP Bank-Pick Szeged |
| 32 | GK | Kristóf Palasics | 19 April 2002 (aged 21) | 1.99 m | 4 | 0 | (Spain) CB Ciudad de Logroño |
| 33 | RB | Gábor Ancsin | 27 November 1990 (aged 33) | 2.02 m | 145 | 314 | (Hungary) Tatabánya KC |
| 39 | LB | Richárd Bodó | 13 March 1993 (aged 30) | 2.03 m | 96 | 293 | (Hungary) OTP Bank-Pick Szeged |
| 43 | RB | Zoran Ilić | 2 January 2002 (aged 22) | 1.97 m | 18 | 20 | (Germany) HSV Hamburg |
| 45 | P | Miklós Rosta | 14 February 1999 (aged 24) | 2.03 m | 49 | 126 | (Romania) Dinamo București |
| 61 | GK | László Bartucz | 5 November 1991 (aged 32) | 1.94 m | 13 | 0 | (Hungary) Tatabánya KC |
| 66 | CB | Máté Lékai | 16 June 1988 (aged 35) | 1.90 m | 166 | 498 | (Hungary) Ferencvárosi TC |
| 77 | CB | Egon Hanusz | 25 September 1997 (aged 26) | 1.77 m | 38 | 63 | (Germany) TVB Stuttgart |
| 91 | RW | Bence Imre | 15 October 2002 (aged 21) | 1.85 m | 3 | 13 | (Hungary) Ferencvárosi TC |

=== Iceland ===
A 20-player squad was announced on 18 December 2023. It was reduced to 18 players on 4 January 2024.

Head coach: Snorri Guðjónsson

| No. | Pos. | Name | Date of birth (age) | Height | App. | Goals | Club |
|---|---|---|---|---|---|---|---|
| 1 | GK | Björgvin Páll Gústavsson | 24 May 1985 (aged 38) | 1.93 m | 260 | 21 | (Iceland) Valur |
| 2 | RW | Óðinn Þór Ríkharðsson | 23 October 1997 (aged 26) | 1.83 m | 31 | 91 | (Switzerland) Kadetten Schaffhausen |
| 3 | CB | Janus Daði Smárason | 1 January 1995 (aged 29) | 1.84 m | 74 | 118 | (Germany) SC Magdeburg |
| 4 | LB | Aron Pálmarsson | 19 July 1990 (aged 33) | 1.93 m | 170 | 649 | (Iceland) Fimleikafélag Hafnarfjarðar |
| 7 | RB | Viggó Kristjánsson | 9 December 1993 (aged 30) | 1.87 m | 46 | 120 | (Germany) SC DHfK Leipzig |
| 8 | LW | Bjarki Már Elísson | 16 May 1990 (aged 33) | 1.90 m | 107 | 372 | (Hungary) Telekom Veszprém |
| 9 | LB | Elvar Örn Jónsson | 31 August 1997 (aged 26) | 1.85 m | 68 | 160 | (Germany) MT Melsungen |
| 10 | CB | Gísli Þorgeir Kristjánsson | 30 July 1999 (aged 24) | 1.91 m | 53 | 121 | (Germany) SC Magdeburg |
| 11 | P | Ýmir Örn Gíslason | 1 July 1997 (aged 26) | 1.96 m | 80 | 35 | (Germany) Rhein-Neckar Löwen |
| 14 | RB | Ómar Ingi Magnússon | 12 March 1997 (aged 26) | 1.86 m | 76 | 261 | (Germany) SC Magdeburg |
| 16 | GK | Viktor Gísli Hallgrímsson | 24 July 2000 (aged 23) | 2.03 m | 51 | 1 | (France) HBC Nantes |
| 17 | LW | Stiven Tobar Valencia | 27 October 2000 (aged 23) | 1.84 m | 8 | 10 | (Portugal) SL Benfica |
| 18 | P | Elliði Snær Viðarsson | 15 November 1998 (aged 25) | 1.92 m | 39 | 76 | (Germany) VfL Gummersbach |
| 21 | P | Arnar Freyr Arnarsson | 14 March 1996 (aged 27) | 2.01 m | 87 | 94 | (Germany) MT Melsungen |
| 22 | RW | Sigvaldi Guðjónsson | 4 July 1994 (aged 29) | 1.92 m | 65 | 184 | (Norway) Kolstad Håndball |
| 23 | RB | Kristján Örn Kristjánsson | 25 December 1997 (aged 26) | 1.90 m | 31 | 60 | (France) Pays d'Aix UC |
| 25 | CB | Haukur Þrastarson | 14 April 2001 (aged 22) | 1.93 m | 25 | 32 | (Poland) Industria Kielce |
| 27 | LB | Einar Þorsteinn Ólafsson | 30 September 2001 (aged 22) | 1.94 m | 4 | 0 | (Denmark) Fredericia HK |

=== Montenegro ===
A 21-player squad was announced on 14 December 2023. It was reduced to 17 players on 9 January 2024.

Head coach: (Croatia) Vlado Šola

| No. | Pos. | Name | Date of birth (age) | Height | App. | Goals | Club |
|---|---|---|---|---|---|---|---|
| 1 | GK | Nikola Matović | 8 May 1998 (aged 25) | 1.91 m | 15 | 0 | (Sweden) Amo Handboll |
| 4 | LW | Aleksandar Bakić | 3 September 2000 (aged 23) | 1.94 m | 9 | 11 | (Croatia) RK Nexe Našice |
| 5 | LB | Arsenije Dragašević | 18 July 2002 (aged 21) | 2.02 m | 2 | 0 | (Switzerland) HC Pfadi Dietlikon |
| 6 | LW | Miloš Vujović | 5 September 1993 (aged 30) | 1.81 m | 48 | 96 | (Germany) VfL Gummersbach |
| 7 | RB | Stefan Čavor | 3 November 1994 (aged 29) | 1.97 m | 39 | 56 | (Germany) HSG Wetzlar |
| 8 | P | Vuk Lazović | 10 March 1988 (aged 35) | 2.00 m | 21 | 34 | (Bahrain) Al-Najma SC |
| 9 | CB | Radojica Čepić | 29 July 2002 (aged 21) | 1.94 m | 11 | 23 | (Switzerland) HC Kriens-Luzern |
| 10 | P | Miodrag Ćorsović | 22 February 2000 (aged 23) | 1.98 m | 6 | 4 | (Slovenia) RK Trimo Trebnje |
| 11 | RB | Branko Vujović | 20 April 1998 (aged 25) | 1.96 m | 15 | 37 | (Germany) TSV Hannover-Burgdorf |
| 12 | GK | Haris Suljević | 26 February 2001 (aged 22) | 1.94 m | 0 | 0 | (Bosnia and Herzegovina) RK Izviđač |
| 13 | RW | Mirko Radović | 15 June 1990 (aged 33) | 1.86 m | 43 | 76 | (Montenegro) RK Lovćen |
| 16 | GK | Nebojša Simić | 19 January 1993 (aged 30) | 1.92 m | 36 | 2 | (Germany) MT Melsungen |
| 17 | LB | Vasilije Kaluđerović | 3 October 1998 (aged 25) | 1.91 m | 13 | 23 | (Kuwait) Qadsia SC |
| 24 | LB | Miloš Božović | 10 December 1994 (aged 29) | 1.99 m | 31 | 41 | (France) US Ivry Handball |
| 26 | RB | Risto Vujačić | 4 December 1993 (aged 30) | 1.90 m | 12 | 9 | (Israel) HC Ramat HaSharon |
| 27 | RW | Luka Radović | 29 December 1997 (aged 26) | 1.80 m | 7 | 12 | (France) Saran Loiret HB |
| 31 | RW | Vojislav Vukić | 5 March 2003 (aged 20) | 1.80 m | 0 | 0 | (Slovenia) MRK Krka |
| 32 | CB | Božo Anđelić | 16 March 1992 (aged 31) | 1.86 m | 23 | 41 | (Hungary) PLER KC |
| 35 | LB | Vuko Borozan | 9 April 1994 (aged 29) | 2.02 m | 15 | 34 | (Montenegro) RK Lovćen |
| 90 | P | Nemanja Grbović | 26 April 1990 (aged 33) | 1.83 m | 56 | 97 | (Romania) Steaua București |

=== Serbia ===
A 20-player squad was announced on 12 December 2023. It was reduced to 18 players on 10 January 2024.

Head coach: (Spain) Toni Gerona

| No. | Pos. | Name | Date of birth (age) | Height | App. | Goals | Club |
|---|---|---|---|---|---|---|---|
| 1 | GK | Vladimir Cupara | 19 February 1994 (aged 29) | 1.99 m | 67 | 4 | (Romania) Dinamo București |
| 3 | RW | Vukašin Vorkapić | 1 October 1997 (aged 26) | 1.88 m | 35 | 71 | (Serbia) RK Vojvodina |
| 5 | LB | Miloš Kos | 1 August 2002 (aged 21) | 1.92 m | 9 | 19 | (Croatia) RK Zagreb |
| 11 | LB | Ilija Abutović | 2 August 1988 (aged 35) | 2.02 m | 55 | 22 | (France) C' Chartres MHB |
| 13 | LB | Uroš Borzaš | 28 July 1999 (aged 24) | 1.98 m | 31 | 58 | (North Macedonia) RK Eurofarm Pelister |
| 14 | LB | Marko Milosavljević | 13 September 1998 (aged 25) | 2.01 m | 28 | 57 | (Spain) CB Ademar León |
| 15 | RW | Uroš Kojadinović | 26 September 2000 (aged 23) | 1.87 m | 11 | 30 | (Serbia) RK Partizan |
| 17 | RW | Bogdan Radivojević | 2 March 1993 (aged 30) | 1.92 m | 85 | 252 | (North Macedonia) RK Eurofarm Pelister |
| 19 | LW | Nemanja Ilić | 11 May 1990 (aged 33) | 1.76 m | 137 | 374 | (France) Fenix Toulouse |
| 20 | LB | Miljan Pušica | 30 June 1991 (aged 32) | 2.02 m | 42 | 16 | (Serbia) RK Vojvodina |
| 21 | LW | Vanja Ilić | 25 February 1993 (aged 30) | 1.85 m | 86 | 215 | (France) C' Chartres MHB |
| 22 | RB | Miloš Orbović | 2 November 1993 (aged 30) | 1.93 m | 28 | 42 | (Switzerland) HC Kriens-Luzern |
| 23 | RB | Predrag Vejin | 17 December 1992 (aged 31) | 1.96 m | 18 | 29 | (Croatia) RK Nexe Našice |
| 24 | CB | Lazar Kukić | 12 December 1995 (aged 28) | 1.88 m | 56 | 196 | (Romania) Dinamo București |
| 33 | P | Luka Rogan | 4 July 2003 (aged 20) | 1.94 m | 5 | 9 | (Serbia) RK Vojvodina |
| 44 | LB | Petar Đorđić | 17 September 1990 (aged 33) | 1.95 m | 39 | 88 | (Serbia) RK Vojvodina |
| 46 | P | Dragan Pechmalbec | 5 January 1996 (aged 28) | 1.94 m | 26 | 72 | (Hungary) Telekom Veszprém |
| 93 | P | Mijajlo Marsenić | 9 March 1993 (aged 30) | 2.02 m | 121 | 328 | (Germany) Füchse Berlin |
| 96 | GK | Dejan Milosavljev | 16 March 1996 (aged 27) | 1.96 m | 66 | 3 | (Germany) Füchse Berlin |
| 99 | GK | Milan Bomaštar | 10 July 1999 (aged 24) | 2.01 m | 18 | 0 | (France) C' Chartres MHB |

== Group D ==
=== Faroe Islands ===
A 19-player squad was announced on 27 December 2023.

Head coach: (Denmark) Peter Bredsdorff-Larsen

| No. | Pos. | Name | Date of birth (age) | Height | App. | Goals | Club |
|---|---|---|---|---|---|---|---|
| 1 | GK | Pauli Jacobsen | 11 July 2002 (aged 21) | 1.82 m | 12 | 0 | (Denmark) HØJ Elite |
| 2 | P | Helgi Hildarson Hoydal | 1 May 1996 (aged 27) | 1.88 m | 32 | 48 | (Norway) Kristiansand Topphåndball |
| 6 | LW | Leivur Mortensen | 25 March 1999 (aged 24) | 1.85 m | 15 | 24 | (Denmark) Frederiksberg IF |
| 7 | RW | Allan Norðberg | 25 March 1995 (aged 28) | 1.89 m | 33 | 49 | (Iceland) Valur |
| 8 | P | Pætur Mikkjalsson | 11 May 1997 (aged 26) | 1.90 m | 11 | 15 | (Sweden) IF Hallby |
| 9 | LW | Rói Berg Hansen | 11 April 1996 (aged 27) | 1.82 m | 32 | 56 | (Denmark) HØJ Elite |
| 10 | RB | Kjartan Johansen | 17 April 1996 (aged 27) | 1.90 m | 38 | 73 | (Norway) Bækkelagets SK |
| 15 | CB | Jónas Gunnarsson Djurhuus | 8 September 1996 (aged 27) | 1.83 m | 35 | 74 | (Denmark) Frederiksberg IF |
| 16 | GK | Nicholas Satchwell | 23 July 1991 (aged 32) | 1.88 m | 32 | 0 | (Norway) TIF Viking |
| 17 | RW | Hákun West Av Teigum | 19 February 2002 (aged 21) | 1.88 m | 19 | 86 | (Germany) Füchse Berlin |
| 25 | RB | Vilhelm Poulsen | 20 August 1999 (aged 24) | 1.90 m | 23 | 30 | (Denmark) Lemvig-Thyborøn Håndbold |
| 30 | LB | Tróndur Mikkelsen | 1 July 2000 (aged 23) | 1.90 m | 15 | 36 | (Norway) Kristiansand Topphåndball |
| 45 | RB | Peter Krogh | 20 July 1990 (aged 33) | 1.91 m | 40 | 123 | (Denmark) HEI Håndbold |
| 47 | P | Ísak Vedelsbøl | 18 October 2004 (aged 19) | 1.96 m | 2 | 2 | (Faroe Islands) Hondbóltsfelagið H71 |
| 61 | LB | Pauli Mittún | 30 May 2002 (aged 21) | 1.88 m | 13 | 9 | (Denmark) Team Sydhavsøerne |
| 71 | CB | Elias Ellefsen á Skipagøtu | 19 May 2002 (aged 21) | 1.87 m | 11 | 67 | (Germany) THW Kiel |
| 75 | CB | Rói Ellefsen á Skipagøtu | 10 October 2003 (aged 20) | 1.84 m | 3 | 4 | (Sweden) IF Hallby |
| 78 | LB | Óli Mittún | 10 June 2005 (aged 18) | 1.86 m | 8 | 31 | (Sweden) IK Sävehof |
| 79 | P | Teis Horn Rasmussen | 31 March 1996 (aged 27) | 1.95 m | 21 | 28 | (Denmark) HEI Håndbold |

=== Norway ===
A 19-player squad was announced on 11 December 2023. On 14 January 2024, Gabriel Setterblom replaced Magnus Abelvik Rød in the squad due to an injury. On 17 January, Kent Robin Tønnesen was added to the squad.

Head coach: Jonas Wille

| No. | Pos. | Name | Date of birth (age) | Height | App. | Goals | Club |
|---|---|---|---|---|---|---|---|
| 3 | CB | Vetle Eck Aga | 4 October 1993 (aged 30) | 1.90 m | 40 | 4 | (Norway) Kolstad Håndball |
| 5 | LB | Sander Sagosen | 14 September 1995 (aged 28) | 1.95 m | 156 | 793 | (Norway) Kolstad Håndball |
| 6 | LW | Sebastian Barthold | 27 August 1991 (aged 32) | 1.85 m | 71 | 197 | (Denmark) Aalborg Håndbold |
| 7 | CB | Sander Øverjordet | 8 April 1996 (aged 27) | 1.91 m | 49 | 47 | (Denmark) KIF Kolding |
| 9 | P | Henrik Jakobsen | 16 December 1992 (aged 31) | 1.96 m | 53 | 50 | (Denmark) GOG Håndbold |
| 11 | P | Petter Øverby | 26 March 1992 (aged 31) | 2.00 m | 125 | 121 | (Germany) THW Kiel |
| 12 | GK | Kristian Sæverås | 22 June 1996 (aged 27) | 1.94 m | 74 | 3 | (Germany) SC DHfK Leipzig |
| 13 | LB | Erik Thorsteinsen Toft | 14 November 1992 (aged 31) | 1.92 m | 28 | 54 | (Denmark) KIF Kolding |
| 15 | RB | Kent Robin Tønnesen | 5 June 1991 (aged 32) | 1.95 m | 133 | 333 | (France) Paris Saint-Germain Handball |
| 19 | RW | Kristian Bjørnsen | 10 January 1989 (aged 35) | 1.91 m | 184 | 660 | (Denmark) Aalborg Håndbold |
| 21 | P | Magnus Gullerud | 13 November 1991 (aged 32) | 1.94 m | 180 | 263 | (Norway) Kolstad Håndball |
| 22 | CB | Tobias Grøndahl | 22 January 2001 (aged 22) | 1.83 m | 24 | 44 | (Norway) Elverum Håndball |
| 23 | LB | Gøran Johannessen | 26 April 1994 (aged 29) | 1.93 m | 104 | 246 | (Norway) Kolstad Håndball |
| 24 | CB | Christian O'Sullivan | 22 August 1991 (aged 32) | 1.90 m | 179 | 286 | (Germany) SC Magdeburg |
| 27 | RB | Harald Reinkind | 17 August 1992 (aged 31) | 1.97 m | 158 | 341 | (Germany) THW Kiel |
| 30 | GK | Torbjørn Bergerud | 16 July 1994 (aged 29) | 2.01 m | 133 | 0 | (Norway) Kolstad Håndball |
| 42 | RB | Gabriel Setterblom | 22 November 1997 (aged 26) | 1.94 m | 2 | 4 | (Norway) Kolstad Håndball |
| 43 | LB | Simen Lyse | 1 February 2000 (aged 23) | 1.99 m | 4 | 11 | (Norway) Kolstad Håndball |
| 44 | RW | Kevin Gulliksen | 9 November 1996 (aged 27) | 1.80 m | 92 | 164 | (Denmark) TTH Holstebro |
| 71 | LW | Alexander Blonz | 17 April 2000 (aged 23) | 1.89 m | 72 | 146 | (Denmark) GOG Håndbold |
| 77 | RB | Magnus Abelvik Rød | 7 July 1997 (aged 26) | 2.04 m | 86 | 193 | (Norway) Kolstad Håndball |

=== Poland ===
A 27-player squad was announced on 11 December 2023. It was reduced to 20 players on 30 December. On 10 January 2024, the roster consisted of 18 players.

Head coach: Marcin Lijewski

| No. | Pos. | Name | Date of birth (age) | Height | App. | Goals | Club |
|---|---|---|---|---|---|---|---|
| 1 | GK | Mateusz Kornecki | 5 June 1994 (aged 29) | 1.93 m | 73 | 6 | (Germany) ThSV Eisenach |
| 2 | LB | Damian Przytuła | 27 November 1998 (aged 25) | 2.00 m | 38 | 64 | (Poland) Górnik Zabrze |
| 3 | RB | Michał Daszek | 27 June 1992 (aged 31) | 1.82 m | 150 | 383 | (Poland) Orlen Wisła Płock |
| 4 | CB | Piotr Jędraszczyk | 9 October 2001 (aged 22) | 1.77 m | 33 | 63 | (Poland) Gwardia Opole |
| 5 | CB | Michał Olejniczak | 31 January 2001 (aged 22) | 1.97 m | 64 | 109 | (Poland) Industria Kielce |
| 8 | P | Bartłomiej Bis | 25 March 1997 (aged 26) | 1.94 m | 29 | 12 | (Germany) HSC 2000 Coburg |
| 9 | LB | Szymon Sićko | 20 August 1997 (aged 26) | 2.00 m | 59 | 222 | (Poland) Industria Kielce |
| 11 | CB | Paweł Paterek | 17 December 2000 (aged 23) | 1.86 m | 10 | 14 | (Poland) SPR Chrobry Głogów |
| 12 | LB | Ariel Pietrasik | 21 October 1999 (aged 24) | 2.02 m | 34 | 66 | (Switzerland) Kadetten Schaffhausen |
| 15 | LB | Jakub Powarzyński | 7 September 2002 (aged 21) | 1.92 m | 5 | 7 | (Poland) Wybrzeże Gdańsk |
| 21 | P | Kamil Syprzak | 23 July 1991 (aged 32) | 2.07 m | 168 | 351 | (France) Paris Saint-Germain |
| 22 | RW | Mateusz Kosmala | 26 July 1999 (aged 24) | 1.82 m | 5 | 11 | (Poland) MMTS Kwidzyn |
| 28 | P | Maciej Gębala | 10 January 1994 (aged 30) | 2.00 m | 96 | 127 | (Germany) SC DHfK Leipzig |
| 33 | RW | Jakub Szyszko | 18 February 2001 (aged 22) | 1.79 m | 6 | 14 | (Poland) Górnik Zabrze |
| 34 | LW | Przemysław Urbaniak | 10 August 1998 (aged 25) | 1.82 m | 5 | 10 | (Poland) Ostrovia Ostrów Wielkopolski |
| 36 | P | Dawid Dawydzik | 7 December 1994 (aged 29) | 2.00 m | 54 | 74 | (Poland) Orlen Wisła Płock |
| 44 | LW | Mikołaj Czapliński | 8 November 2000 (aged 23) | 1.88 m | 14 | 23 | (Spain) CD Torrebalonmano |
| 50 | GK | Jakub Skrzyniarz | 6 June 1996 (aged 27) | 1.89 m | 20 | 0 | (Spain) CD Bidasoa |

=== Slovenia ===
A 21-player squad was announced on 26 December 2023. It was reduced to 18 players on 8 January 2024.

Head coach: Uroš Zorman

| No. | Pos. | Name | Date of birth (age) | Height | App. | Goals | Club |
|---|---|---|---|---|---|---|---|
| 3 | P | Blaž Blagotinšek | 17 January 1994 (aged 29) | 2.03 m | 124 | 222 | (Germany) SG Flensburg-Handewitt |
| 6 | RW | Gašper Marguč | 20 August 1990 (aged 33) | 1.80 m | 126 | 439 | (Hungary) Telekom Veszprém |
| 11 | RB | Jure Dolenec | 6 December 1988 (aged 35) | 1.91 m | 183 | 662 | (France) Limoges Handball |
| 16 | GK | Miljan Vujović | 27 August 2000 (aged 23) | 1.98 m | 9 | 0 | (Germany) TVB Stuttgart |
| 17 | RB | Nejc Cehte | 4 September 1992 (aged 31) | 1.96 m | 59 | 99 | (North Macedonia) RK Eurofarm Pelister |
| 19 | LW | Staš Jovičić | 6 December 2000 (aged 23) | 1.88 m | 12 | 40 | (Slovenia) RK Trimo Trebnje |
| 20 | LW | Tilen Kodrin | 14 May 1994 (aged 29) | 1.92 m | 75 | 128 | (Germany) VfL Gummersbach |
| 23 | CB | Miha Zarabec | 12 October 1991 (aged 32) | 1.78 m | 93 | 197 | (Poland) Orlen Wisła Płock |
| 26 | GK | Klemen Ferlin | 26 June 1989 (aged 34) | 1.92 m | 61 | 1 | (Germany) HC Erlangen |
| 27 | P | Kristjan Horžen | 8 December 1999 (aged 24) | 1.92 m | 32 | 36 | (Germany) VfL Gummersbach |
| 31 | LW | Tadej Mazej | 31 July 1998 (aged 25) | 1.90 m | 26 | 18 | (Slovenia) Celje Pivovarna Laško |
| 44 | CB | Dean Bombač | 4 April 1989 (aged 34) | 1.90 m | 116 | 239 | (Hungary) OTP Bank-Pick Szeged |
| 51 | LB | Borut Mačkovšek | 11 September 1992 (aged 31) | 2.03 m | 133 | 337 | (Hungary) OTP Bank-Pick Szeged |
| 77 | RW | Domen Novak | 26 April 1998 (aged 25) | 1.81 m | 24 | 63 | (Germany) HSG Wetzlar |
| 88 | CB | Aleks Vlah | 22 July 1997 (aged 26) | 1.91 m | 32 | 90 | (Denmark) Aalborg Håndbold |
| 90 | GK | Urban Lesjak | 24 August 1990 (aged 33) | 1.88 m | 74 | 0 | (North Macedonia) RK Eurofarm Pelister |
| 92 | P | Jernej Drobež | 6 January 2000 (aged 24) | 1.95 m | 8 | 7 | (Slovenia) RK Gorenje Velenje |
| 95 | P | Matic Suholežnik | 2 May 1995 (aged 28) | 2.02 m | 51 | 45 | (Croatia) RK Zagreb |

== Group E ==
=== Bosnia and Herzegovina ===
A 21-player squad was announced on 13 December 2023. It was reduced to 18 players on 7 January 2024.

Head coach: (Croatia) Irfan Smajlagić

| No. | Pos. | Name | Date of birth (age) | Height | App. | Goals | Club |
|---|---|---|---|---|---|---|---|
| 5 | LB | Mirko Herceg | 26 February 1992 (aged 31) | 1.95 m | 20 | 40 | (Hungary) Csurgói KK |
| 8 | P | Senjamin Burić | 20 November 1990 (aged 33) | 1.98 m | 84 | 197 | (Denmark) Skjern Håndbold |
| 9 | LW | Adi Mehmedćehajić | 20 June 2001 (aged 22) | 1.91 m | 11 | 10 | (Bosnia and Herzegovina) RK Gračanica |
| 10 | RB | Marko Panić | 10 March 1991 (aged 32) | 1.97 m | 72 | 184 | (France) Montpellier Handball |
| 12 | GK | Benjamin Burić | 20 November 1990 (aged 33) | 1.96 m | 81 | 5 | (Germany) SG Flensburg-Handewitt |
| 14 | CB | Mirsad Terzić | 12 July 1983 (aged 40) | 1.96 m | 172 | 460 | (Poland) Orlen Wisła Płock |
| 15 | P | Adin Faljić | 24 September 2000 (aged 23) | 1.97 m | 9 | 4 | (Croatia) RK Zagreb |
| 16 | GK | Admir Ahmetašević | 5 June 1994 (aged 29) | 1.95 m | 15 | 0 | (Switzerland) Pfadi Winterthur |
| 17 | RW | Luka Perić | 13 March 2003 (aged 20) | 1.95 m | 13 | 24 | (Slovenia) Celje Pivovarna Laško |
| 20 | LB | Luka Knežević | 11 February 2000 (aged 23) | 1.95 m | 5 | 7 | (Bosnia and Herzegovina) RK Sloboda Tuzla |
| 21 | RB | Nedim Hadžić | 22 March 2000 (aged 23) | 1.89 m | 5 | 1 | (Bosnia and Herzegovina) RK Borac Banja Luka |
| 23 | LB | Dino Hamidović | 11 July 1996 (aged 27) | 1.95 m | 17 | 33 | (Bosnia and Herzegovina) RK Gračanica |
| 26 | LB | Igor Mandić | 16 October 1991 (aged 32) | 1.96 m | 18 | 3 | (France) Sélestat Alsace Handball |
| 34 | CB | Marko Davidović | 27 August 1992 (aged 31) | 1.88 m | 12 | 23 | (Slovakia) HT Tatran Prešov |
| 35 | LW | Marko Majstorović | 24 September 2001 (aged 22) | 1.87 m | 4 | 0 | (Slovenia) MRK Krka |
| 36 | RW | Vladan Đurđević | 8 October 1996 (aged 27) | 1.86 m | 3 | 6 | (Bosnia and Herzegovina) RK Sloga Doboj |
| 40 | GK | Harun Hodžić | 7 June 2000 (aged 23) | 1.95 m | 2 | 0 | (France) Chambéry Savoie MHB |
| 80 | P | Amir Muhović | 2 December 1999 (aged 24) | 2.04 m | 9 | 7 | (Bosnia and Herzegovina) RK Borac Banja Luka |

=== Georgia ===
A 17-player squad was announced on 25 December 2023.

Head coach: Tite Kalandadze

| No. | Pos. | Name | Date of birth (age) | Height | App. | Goals | Club |
|---|---|---|---|---|---|---|---|
| 3 | P | George Lapiashvili | 12 November 2000 (aged 23) | 1.95 m | 33 | 90 | (Georgia (country)) B.S.B. Batumi |
| 7 | LW | Khazein Rustamov | 9 December 1998 (aged 25) | 1.80 m | 38 | 82 | (Bosnia and Herzegovina) MRK Iskra Bugojno |
| 9 | CB | Giorgi Areshidze | 23 July 2004 (aged 19) | 1.90 m | 23 | 81 | (Georgia (country)) HC Pegasi |
| 10 | CB | Irakli Kbilashvili | 2 October 1998 (aged 25) | 1.89 m | 36 | 122 | (Romania) AHC Potaissa Turda |
| 11 | RB | Giorgi Tskhovrebadze | 19 February 2001 (aged 22) | 1.93 m | 43 | 314 | (Germany) VfL Gummersbach |
| 12 | GK | Zurab Tsintsadze | 3 October 1996 (aged 27) | 1.85 m | 34 | 5 | (Poland) KS Azoty-Puławy |
| 14 | LB | Teimuraz Orjonikidze | 7 February 1996 (aged 27) | 1.95 m | 53 | 198 | (North Macedonia) GRK Ohrid |
| 15 | RW | Irakli Gogoladze | 15 November 1996 (aged 27) | 1.79 m | 35 | 24 | (Georgia (country)) B.S.B. Batumi |
| 18 | P | Erekle Arsenashvili | 18 October 1998 (aged 25) | 1.97 m | 27 | 83 | (Spain) BM Puente Genil |
| 21 | RB | Sandro Darsania | 14 June 2004 (aged 19) | 1.90 m | 31 | 163 | (Portugal) Belenenses |
| 24 | RB | Zurab Gogava | 14 September 1998 (aged 25) | 1.96 m | 22 | 15 | (Germany) LHC Cottbus |
| 30 | LW | Zurab Abramishvili | 23 January 1994 (aged 29) | 1.93 m | 42 | 43 | (Georgia (country)) B.S.B. Batumi |
| 34 | LB | Miriani Gavashelishvili | 21 September 2000 (aged 23) | 1.97 m | 22 | 6 | (Serbia) RK Metaloplastika |
| 71 | RW | Giorgi Dikhaminjia | 21 June 1997 (aged 26) | 1.88 m | 46 | 79 | (Czech Republic) Město Lovosice |
| 87 | GK | David Nikabadze | 16 June 1999 (aged 24) | 1.99 m | 5 | 0 | (Russia) SGAU Saratov |
| 94 | CB | Zuriko Simonia | 25 August 1994 (aged 29) | 1.83 m | 34 | 31 | (Georgia (country)) HC Kutaisi |

=== Netherlands ===
A 16-player squad was announced on 18 December 2023. The roster was 18 players on 28 December.

Head coach: (Sweden) Staffan Olsson

| No. | Pos. | Name | Date of birth (age) | Height | App. | Goals | Club |
|---|---|---|---|---|---|---|---|
| 1 | GK | Bart Ravensbergen | 14 March 1993 (aged 30) | 1.90 m | 98 | 14 | (Germany) Frisch Auf Göppingen |
| 3 | CB | Ivar Stavast | 13 January 1998 (aged 25) | 1.91 m | 37 | 48 | (Germany) HC Elbflorenz Dresden |
| 4 | RB | Janik van Zundert | 8 September 2002 (aged 21) | 1.91 m | 3 | 0 | (Netherlands) Bevo HC |
| 5 | LW | Rutger ten Velde | 5 March 1997 (aged 26) | 1.78 m | 59 | 138 | (Germany) TuS Nettelstedt-Lübbecke |
| 6 | LB | Niko Blaauw | 15 January 2002 (aged 21) | 1.90 m | 11 | 2 | (Germany) VfL Lübeck-Schwartau |
| 7 | LB | Robin Schoenaker | 23 August 1995 (aged 28) | 1.98 m | 49 | 8 | (Belgium) Sporting Pelt |
| 11 | RB | Iso Sluijters | 24 July 1990 (aged 33) | 1.92 m | 108 | 191 | (Switzerland) GC Amicitia Zürich |
| 13 | P | Samir Benghanem | 10 December 1993 (aged 30) | 1.94 m | 65 | 117 | (Netherlands) Green Park/Handbal Aalsmeer |
| 14 | RW | Bobby Schagen | 13 January 1990 (aged 33) | 1.90 m | 129 | 393 | (Germany) TBV Lemgo |
| 15 | P | Lars Kooij | 11 August 2000 (aged 23) | 1.99 m | 12 | 11 | (Germany) TV Emsdetten |
| 17 | LW | Kaj Geenen | 6 May 2003 (aged 20) | 1.84 m | 8 | 1 | (Germany) VfL Lübeck-Schwartau |
| 20 | RB | Niels Versteijnen | 3 February 2000 (aged 23) | 2.00 m | 37 | 46 | (Germany) TBV Lemgo |
| 21 | P | Martijn Kleijkers | 22 February 2001 (aged 22) | 1.88 m | 0 | 0 | (Netherlands) Limburg Lions |
| 22 | CB | Luc Steins | 22 March 1995 (aged 28) | 1.73 m | 103 | 290 | (France) Paris Saint-Germain |
| 23 | LB | Jorn Smits | 3 September 1992 (aged 31) | 1.93 m | 67 | 94 | (Denmark) Lemvig-Thyborøn Håndbold |
| 27 | RW | Alec Smit | 15 May 1999 (aged 24) | 1.82 m | 49 | 60 | (Denmark) SønderjyskE Elite |
| 28 | P | Tim Claessens | 9 January 1999 (aged 25) | 1.97 m | 9 | 1 | (Belgium) Achilles Bocholt |
| 30 | GK | Arjan Versteijnen | 3 February 2000 (aged 23) | 1.93 m | 20 | 1 | (Netherlands) Bevo HC |
| 33 | CB | Thomas Houtepen | 15 May 2002 (aged 21) | 1.83 m | 7 | 5 | (Germany) TBV Lemgo |
| 77 | CB | Dani Baijens | 5 May 1998 (aged 25) | 1.82 m | 73 | 187 | (Germany) HSV Hamburg |

=== Sweden ===
An 18-player squad was announced on 10 December 2023.

Head coach: (Norway) Glenn Solberg

| No. | Pos. | Name | Date of birth (age) | Height | App. | Goals | Club |
|---|---|---|---|---|---|---|---|
| 2 | LB | Jonathan Carlsbogård | 19 April 1995 (aged 28) | 1.95 m | 59 | 112 | (Spain) FC Barcelona |
| 5 | P | Max Darj | 27 September 1991 (aged 32) | 1.91 m | 110 | 121 | (Germany) Füchse Berlin |
| 11 | RW | Daniel Pettersson | 6 May 1992 (aged 31) | 1.79 m | 79 | 188 | (Germany) SC Magdeburg |
| 12 | GK | Andreas Palicka | 10 July 1986 (aged 37) | 1.89 m | 150 | 16 | (France) Paris Saint-Germain |
| 13 | RW | Sebastian Karlsson | 21 January 1995 (aged 28) | 1.78 m | 4 | 15 | (France) Montpellier Handball |
| 15 | LW | Hampus Wanne | 10 December 1993 (aged 30) | 1.85 m | 85 | 347 | (Spain) FC Barcelona |
| 16 | GK | Tobias Thulin | 5 July 1995 (aged 28) | 1.98 m | 49 | 0 | (Denmark) GOG Håndbold |
| 19 | CB | Felix Claar | 5 January 1997 (aged 27) | 1.92 m | 63 | 152 | (Germany) SC Magdeburg |
| 22 | LW | Lucas Pellas | 28 August 1995 (aged 28) | 1.83 m | 60 | 191 | (France) Montpellier Handball |
| 23 | RB | Albin Lagergren | 11 September 1992 (aged 31) | 1.86 m | 100 | 296 | (Germany) SC Magdeburg |
| 24 | CB | Jim Gottfridsson | 2 September 1992 (aged 31) | 1.92 m | 144 | 465 | (Germany) SG Flensburg-Handewitt |
| 28 | CB | Jonathan Edvardsson | 7 April 1997 (aged 26) | 1.86 m | 17 | 7 | (Germany) TSV Hannover-Burgdorf |
| 30 | GK | Simon Möller | 2 July 2000 (aged 23) | 1.90 m | 2 | 0 | (Sweden) IK Sävehof |
| 32 | P | Oscar Bergendahl | 8 March 1995 (aged 28) | 1.92 m | 45 | 72 | (Germany) SC Magdeburg |
| 33 | RB | Lukas Sandell | 3 February 1997 (aged 26) | 1.91 m | 47 | 106 | (Hungary) Telekom Veszprém |
| 35 | P | Andreas Nilsson | 12 April 1990 (aged 33) | 1.96 m | 145 | 344 | (Hungary) Telekom Veszprém |
| 42 | LB | Eric Johansson | 28 June 2000 (aged 23) | 1.97 m | 29 | 89 | (Germany) THW Kiel |
| 49 | LB | Karl Wallinius | 14 January 1999 (aged 24) | 1.99 m | 19 | 21 | (Germany) THW Kiel |

== Group F ==
=== Czech Republic ===
A 24-player squad was announced on 26 December 2023. It was reduced to 20 players on 2 January 2024.

Head coach: (Spain) Xavi Sabaté

| No. | Pos. | Name | Date of birth (age) | Height | App. | Goals | Club |
|---|---|---|---|---|---|---|---|
| 1 | GK | Tomáš Mrkva | 20 January 1989 (aged 34) | 2.01 m | 118 | 9 | (Germany) THW Kiel |
| 2 | LW | Jakub Hrstka | 17 March 1990 (aged 33) | 1.88 m | 140 | 474 | (Germany) Dessau-Roßlauer HV |
| 4 | GK | Jan Hrdlička | 10 November 1996 (aged 27) | 1.89 m | 8 | 0 | (Poland) MKS Kalisz |
| 7 | RB | Tomáš Piroch | 12 May 2000 (aged 23) | 1.87 m | 29 | 61 | (Poland) Orlen Wisła Płock |
| 10 | CB | Jonáš Patzel | 14 February 2002 (aged 21) | 1.90 m | 7 | 10 | (Czech Republic) HCB Karviná |
| 14 | RW | Jakub Štěrba | 11 July 1996 (aged 27) | 1.84 m | 16 | 32 | (Germany) ASV Hamm-Westfalen |
| 16 | GK | Martin Galia | 12 April 1979 (aged 44) | 1.89 m | 219 | 10 | (Czech Republic) HCB Karviná |
| 17 | RB | Stanislav Kašpárek | 11 June 1996 (aged 27) | 2.00 m | 62 | 213 | (Romania) Dinamo București |
| 18 | P | Vít Reichl | 15 June 1993 (aged 30) | 1.88 m | 14 | 41 | (Germany) TV Hüttenberg |
| 19 | CB | Tomáš Babák | 28 December 1993 (aged 30) | 1.86 m | 93 | 290 | (Germany) Bergischer HC |
| 20 | LB | Jaroslav Trkovský | 3 November 2001 (aged 22) | 1.84 m | 11 | 9 | (Czech Republic) HK FCC Město Lovosice |
| 28 | CB | Matěj Havran | 22 January 2002 (aged 21) | 1.90 m | 10 | 2 | (Czech Republic) HC Zubří |
| 31 | LB | Matěj Klíma | 24 March 1999 (aged 24) | 1.92 m | 36 | 141 | (Germany) SC DHfK Leipzig |
| 32 | LB | Vojtěch Patzel | 23 September 1998 (aged 25) | 1.90 m | 39 | 56 | (Germany) VfL Lübeck-Schwartau |
| 34 | LB | Dominik Solák | 17 August 1997 (aged 26) | 1.99 m | 34 | 19 | (Czech Republic) HCB Karviná |
| 39 | CB | Lukáš Mořkovský | 4 January 2002 (aged 22) | 1.89 m | 2 | 3 | (Poland) Górnik Zabrze |
| 66 | P | Štěpán Zeman | 9 May 1997 (aged 26) | 1.97 m | 55 | 53 | (Germany) VfL Gummersbach |
| 77 | P | Daniel Režnický | 26 March 1998 (aged 25) | 1.90 m | 15 | 17 | (Poland) Ostrovia Ostrów Wielkopolski |

=== Denmark ===
A 19-player squad was announced on 14 December 2023.

Head coach: Nikolaj Jacobsen

| No. | Pos. | Name | Date of birth (age) | Height | App. | Goals | Club |
|---|---|---|---|---|---|---|---|
| 1 | GK | Niklas Landin Jacobsen | 19 December 1988 (aged 35) | 2.01 m | 264 | 11 | (Denmark) Aalborg Håndbold |
| 3 | RB | Niclas Kirkeløkke | 26 March 1994 (aged 29) | 1.95 m | 67 | 126 | (Germany) Rhein-Neckar Löwen |
| 4 | LW | Magnus Landin Jacobsen | 20 August 1995 (aged 28) | 1.97 m | 123 | 227 | (Germany) THW Kiel |
| 7 | LW | Emil Jakobsen | 24 January 1998 (aged 25) | 1.90 m | 58 | 204 | (Germany) SG Flensburg-Handewitt |
| 11 | CB | Rasmus Lauge | 20 June 1991 (aged 32) | 1.95 m | 154 | 396 | (Denmark) Bjerringbro-Silkeborg |
| 12 | GK | Emil Nielsen | 10 March 1997 (aged 26) | 1.95 m | 28 | 2 | (Spain) FC Barcelona |
| 15 | P | Magnus Saugstrup | 12 July 1996 (aged 27) | 1.95 m | 72 | 163 | (Germany) SC Magdeburg |
| 18 | RW | Hans Lindberg | 1 August 1981 (aged 42) | 1.88 m | 292 | 788 | (Germany) Füchse Berlin |
| 19 | RB | Mathias Gidsel | 8 February 1999 (aged 24) | 1.90 m | 58 | 294 | (Germany) Füchse Berlin |
| 21 | LB | Henrik Møllgaard | 2 January 1985 (aged 39) | 1.96 m | 207 | 182 | (Denmark) Aalborg Håndbold |
| 22 | CB | Mads Mensah Larsen | 12 August 1991 (aged 32) | 1.88 m | 193 | 319 | (Germany) SG Flensburg-Handewitt |
| 24 | LB | Mikkel Hansen | 22 October 1987 (aged 36) | 1.96 m | 258 | 1311 | (Denmark) Aalborg Håndbold |
| 25 | P | Lukas Jørgensen | 31 March 1999 (aged 24) | 1.94 m | 21 | 68 | (Germany) SG Flensburg-Handewitt |
| 26 | RW | Jóhan Hansen | 1 May 1994 (aged 29) | 1.90 m | 87 | 162 | (Germany) SG Flensburg-Handewitt |
| 27 | LB | Michael Damgaard | 18 March 1990 (aged 33) | 1.92 m | 94 | 247 | (Germany) SC Magdeburg |
| 29 | LB | Aaron Mensing | 11 November 1997 (aged 26) | 2.01 m | 20 | 47 | (Denmark) GOG Håndbold |
| 34 | P | Simon Hald | 28 September 1994 (aged 29) | 2.03 m | 84 | 91 | (Denmark) Aalborg Håndbold |
| 43 | CB | Simon Pytlick | 11 December 2000 (aged 23) | 1.93 m | 25 | 97 | (Germany) SG Flensburg-Handewitt |
| 45 | RB | Emil Wernsdorf Madsen | 1 January 2001 (aged 23) | 1.94 m | 8 | 16 | (Denmark) GOG Håndbold |

=== Greece ===
A 22-player squad was announced on 18 December 2023. It was reduced to 18 players on 27 December. On 1 January, the squad consisted of 21 players. On 10 January 2024, the final squad was announced.

Head coach: Georgios Zaravinas

| No. | Pos. | Name | Date of birth (age) | Height | App. | Goals | Club |
|---|---|---|---|---|---|---|---|
| 5 | CB | Dimitrios Panagiotou | 21 May 2004 (aged 19) | 1.82 m | 12 | 18 | (Greece) Doukas School |
| 6 | LB | Theodoros Boskos | 7 April 2001 (aged 22) | 1.90 m | 24 | 62 | (Spain) BM Puente Genil |
| 8 | P | Nikolaos Liapis | 24 August 1999 (aged 24) | 1.93 m | 33 | 66 | (Greece) AEK Athens |
| 11 | CB | Charalampos Mallios | 6 August 1987 (aged 36) | 1.84 m | 74 | 214 | (Greece) AEK Athens |
| 12 | GK | Eleftherios Papazoglou | 3 July 1997 (aged 26) | 1.92 m | 2 | 0 | (Greece) AC PAOK |
| 13 | P | Stefanos Michailidis | 15 May 1994 (aged 29) | 2.00 m | 31 | 24 | (Greece) Olympiacos |
| 14 | LB | Nikolaos Passias | 17 February 1995 (aged 28) | 1.92 m | 56 | 73 | (Greece) Olympiacos |
| 15 | RB | Achilleas Toskas | 1 October 2004 (aged 19) | 1.91 m | 16 | 52 | (Greece) Bianco Monte |
| 16 | GK | Petros Boukovinas | 8 March 1994 (aged 29) | 1.88 m | 66 | 14 | (Germany) TV Großwallstadt |
| 18 | LW | Georgios Papavasilis | 31 July 2000 (aged 23) | 1.82 m | 27 | 26 | (Greece) Olympiacos |
| 19 | P | Panagiotis Karampourniotis | 20 February 1998 (aged 25) | 1.96 m | 28 | 25 | (Greece) Olympiacos |
| 20 | RB | Athanasios Papazoglou | 28 January 2002 (aged 21) | 1.92 m | 11 | 13 | (Greece) AC PAOK |
| 21 | RW | Dimitrios Tziras | 5 April 1991 (aged 32) | 1.90 m | 85 | 307 | (Greece) Olympiacos |
| 24 | CB | Petros Kandylas | 28 February 1991 (aged 32) | 1.97 m | 63 | 52 | (Greece) Olympiacos |
| 28 | P | Anastasios Papadionysiou | 11 August 1990 (aged 33) | 1.90 m | 85 | 129 | (Greece) AEK Athens |
| 38 | RW | Evangelos Arampatzis | 4 August 1996 (aged 27) | 1.84 m | 47 | 86 | (Greece) AEK Athens |
| 40 | GK | Panagiotis Papantonopoulos | 2 October 2001 (aged 22) | 1.90 m | 23 | 0 | (Greece) Olympiacos |
| 77 | LB | Savvas Savvas | 7 July 1997 (aged 26) | 1.92 m | 12 | 41 | (Greece) Olympiacos |
| 99 | LW | Christos Kederis | 29 April 1994 (aged 29) | 1.69 m | 22 | 38 | (Greece) AEK Athens |

=== Portugal ===
A 17-player squad was announced on 30 December 2023. It consisted of 18 players on 7 January 2024.

Head coach: Paulo Pereira

| No. | Pos. | Name | Date of birth (age) | Height | App. | Goals | Club |
|---|---|---|---|---|---|---|---|
| 4 | RW | Pedro Portela | 6 January 1990 (aged 34) | 1.84 m | 132 | 438 | (Portugal) Sporting CP |
| 5 | LB | Gilberto Duarte | 6 July 1990 (aged 33) | 1.97 m | 116 | 306 | (France) Pays d'Aix UC |
| 10 | CB | Miguel Martins | 4 November 1997 (aged 26) | 1.93 m | 94 | 218 | (Hungary) OTP Bank-Pick Szeged |
| 14 | CB | Rui Silva | 28 April 1993 (aged 30) | 1.85 m | 126 | 224 | (Portugal) FC Porto |
| 16 | GK | Diogo Rêma Marques | 17 March 2004 (aged 19) | 1.89 m | 6 | 1 | (Portugal) FC Porto |
| 21 | LW | Leonel Fernandes | 12 March 1998 (aged 25) | 1.91 m | 38 | 74 | (Portugal) FC Porto |
| 24 | LB | Alexandre Cavalcanti | 27 December 1996 (aged 27) | 2.01 m | 74 | 93 | (France) HBC Nantes |
| 25 | RW | António Areia | 21 June 1990 (aged 33) | 1.89 m | 85 | 260 | (Portugal) FC Porto |
| 26 | RB | Francisco Costa | 16 February 2005 (aged 18) | 1.89 m | 18 | 63 | (Portugal) Sporting CP |
| 30 | P | Fábio Silva | 20 January 2001 (aged 22) | 1.91 m | 0 | 0 | (Portugal) Associação Artística de Avanca |
| 31 | LB | Salvador Salvador | 29 July 2001 (aged 22) | 1.98 m | 15 | 27 | (Portugal) Sporting CP |
| 34 | CB | Gonçalo Vieira | 27 April 1999 (aged 24) | 1.90 m | 5 | 12 | (France) Fenix Toulouse |
| 41 | GK | Gustavo Capdeville | 31 August 1997 (aged 26) | 1.90 m | 42 | 0 | (Portugal) SL Benfica |
| 51 | LW | Pedro Oliveira | 4 July 2002 (aged 21) | 1.88 m | 9 | 17 | (Portugal) FC Porto |
| 55 | RB | Joaquim Nazaré | 25 July 2001 (aged 22) | 1.84 m | 4 | 7 | (Denmark) Skjern Håndbold |
| 79 | CB | Martim Costa | 27 September 2002 (aged 21) | 1.88 m | 16 | 35 | (Portugal) Sporting CP |
| 82 | P | Luís Frade | 11 September 1998 (aged 25) | 1.93 m | 58 | 99 | (Spain) FC Barcelona |
| 86 | P | Ricardo Brandão | 28 April 2004 (aged 19) | 1.99 m | 7 | 8 | (Spain) CB Cangas |
