= Michael Redl =

German handball player and coach (1936-2013)

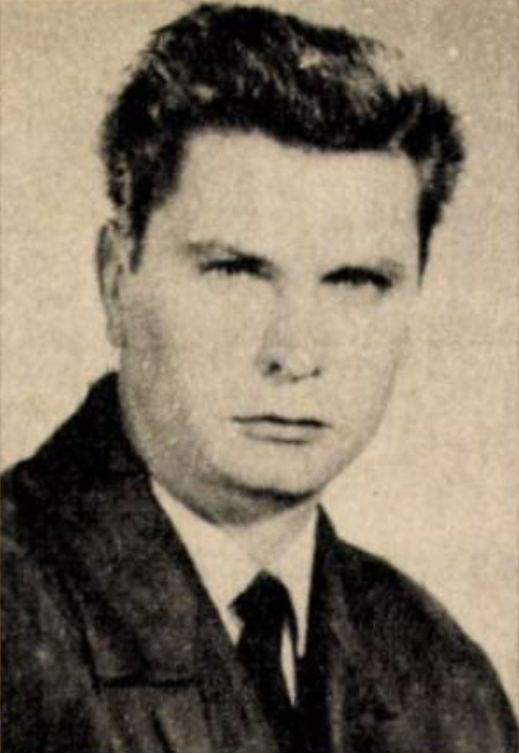

Medal record

Men's Handball

Representing Romania

World Championship
Silver medal – second place	1959 Austria (field)	Team
Gold medal – first place	1961 Germany	Team
Gold medal – first place	1964 Czekoslovakia	Team
Bronze medal – third place	1967 Sweden	Team

Michael (sometimes spelled Mihai) Redl (23 April 1936, in Lugoj – 20 August 2013, in Schongau, Germany) was a Romanian-born German handball player and coach. He played as a goalkeeper, and won two world championships.

With Dinamo București he won nine national handball championships and one field handball championship. and the European Champions Cup in 1965.

At the Handball World Championships in 1959 and 1961 he was named "Best Goalkeeper".

In the 11 years that he played for the Romanian national team he played in 129 games.

After he retired from active play, he was a coach for Dinamo's youth team (for eight years) and assistant coach for the first team (for three years).

Redl, who was nicknamed "The Black Cat", was also a graduate of the Police Academy (1958), and retired as a lieutenant colonel.

In 1987, five years after one of his sons- also called Michael, a national team handball goalkeeper- defected to Holland (during a game Dinamo played in Arnhem), Michael Redl was allowed to emigrate to West Germany. There he coached among other teams, MTSV Schwabing in Munich, where both his sons, Michael and Hans, were goalkeepers.

== Honors and awards ==
- Sport Master, 1959
- Honored Sport Master, 1961
- The Sport Order, Second Class with bar, 2009
