= Virgil Hnat =

Romanian handball player and coach (1936-2001)

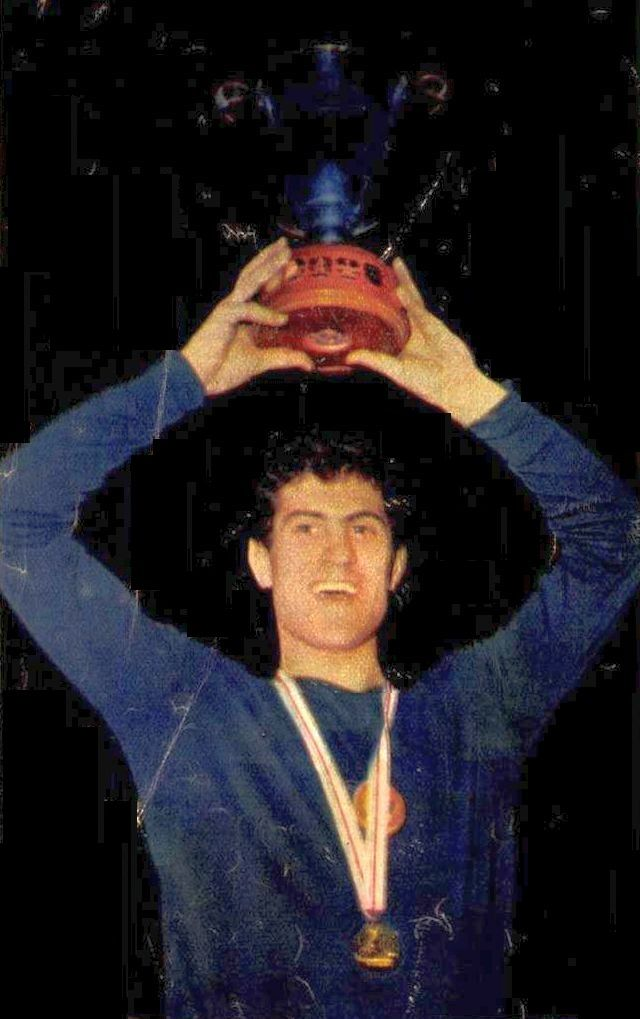

Personal information
- Full name: Virgil Hnat
- Nationality: Romanian
- Born: 1936 Făgăraș, Romania
- Died: March 21, 2001 (aged 65)

Sport
- Sport: Handball
- Position: Centre back

Senior clubs
- Years: Team
- –: Dinamo București
National team
- Years: Team
- –: Romania
Medal record
Representing Romania
World Championship
Gold medal – first place	West Germany 1961	Team
Gold medal – first place	Czechoslovakia 1964	Team
Field World Championship
Silver medal – second place	Austria 1959	Team

Virgil Hnat (1936 – March 21, 2001) was a Romanian handball player and coach who played for Dinamo București and for the national team.

He won the indoor World Championship twice, and a silver medal at the 1959 IHF World Men's Field Handball Championship. He also won the 1965 European Cup with Dinamo București, as well as several national championships.
