= Gabriel Setterblom =

Norwegian handball player (born 1997)

Personal information
- Full name: Gabriel Ask Ostad Setterblom
- Nationality: Norwegian
- Born: 22 November 1997 (age 28) Oslo, Norway
- Height: 1.94 m (6 ft 4 in)

Sport
- Sport: Handball
- Position: Right back
- Current club: SønderjyskE
- Number: 48

Youth career
- Years: Team
- 2004–2014: HK Herulf

Senior clubs
- Years: Team
- 2014–2015: HK Herulf
- 2015–2019: Halden Topphåndball
- 2019–2024: Kolstad Håndball
- 2024–: SønderjyskE
National team
Years	Team	Apps	(Gls)
2024–	Norway	18	(34)

Gabriel Ask Ostad Setterblom (born 22 November 1997) is a Norwegian handball player for SønderjyskE and the Norwegian national team.

He participated at the 2024 European Men's Handball Championship as a squad replacement for Magnus Abelvik Rød.

== Club career ==
Setterblom started his career at HK Herulf in 2004 and played in the club until 2014 and played in the men's team of the club until 2015. In the 2015/2016 season he started playing Halden Topphåndball until before the 2019/2020 season. Before the 2019/2020 season, Setterblom signed a contract with Kolstad Håndball. In 2022/2023, Setterblom won the domestic treble with Kolstad, winning the league, the cup and the league play-offs. From and including the 2024/2025 season he plays for the Danish handball club SønderjyskE until 2027.
