= Victor Iturriza =

Portuguese handball player (born 1990)

Personal information
- Full name: Victor Manuel Iturriza Álvarez
- Nationality: Portuguese
- Born: 22 May 1990 (age 36) Havana, Cuba
- Height: 1.93 m (6 ft 4 in)

Sport
- Sport: Handball
- Position: Pivot
- Current club: Dinamo București
- Number: 4

Senior clubs
- Years: Team
- 2014–2016: Artística de Avanca
- 2016–2025: FC Porto
- 2025–2026: al Kuwait SC
- 2026–: Dinamo București
National team
Years	Team	Apps	(Gls)
2020–	Portugal	59	(206)
- Updated on 14 January 2026

Victor Manuel Iturriza Álvarez (born 22 May 1990) is a Cuban-born Portuguese handballer who plays as pivot for Dinamo București and the Portuguese national team.

== Career ==
Iturriza played until 2014 for the second tier team A.A. Avanca. In the 2014-15 season he was promoted to the top flight, when they finished 2nd. In 2016 he joined top team FC Porto.

For the 2024-25 season he signed for the Qatari club al Kuwait SC.

After a brief spell in Kuwait with al Kuwait SC, he signed a two-year contract with Romanian champions Dinamo București in the summer of 2026, playing under Portugal's national team coach, Paulo Pereira.

=== National team ===
He originally planned to represent Portugal at the 2020 European Men's Handball Championship, but did not manage to get naturalized in time. He played his first game for Portugal on November 4th 2020 against Israel in a qualification game for the 2022 European Men's Handball Championship.

At the 2021 World Championship he finished 10th with Portugal. Later the same year, he finished 9th at the 2021 Olympics.

At the 2022 European Championship he finished 19th with Portugal.

In 2025, he was part of the Portugal team that reached the semifinals of the World Championship for the first time in history. They lost the semifinals to Denmark and the third place playoff to France. At the occasion he made the tournament all-star team. At the 2026 European Men's Handball Championship he was part of the Portugal team that got 5th place, their best ever finish at a European Championship.

== Honours ==
Porto

- Portuguese League: 2018–19, 2020–21, 2021–22, 2022–23
- Portuguese Cup: 2018–19, 2020–21
- Portuguese Super Cup: 2019, 2021

== Individual awards ==
- All-Star pivot of the World Championship: 2025
