= HK Herulf =

Norwegian handball club

- Full name: Håndballklubben Herulf Moss
- Short name: Herulf
- Founded: 1950; 75 years ago
- Arena: Mossehallen, Moss
- Capacity: 600
- Club colours

Håndballklubben Herulf is a Norwegian handball club from Moss, founded on 6 September 1950.

The men's team currently competes in the First Division, the second tier of Norwegian handball. Notable players include Mats Fransson and Geir Erlandsen. The women's team plays in the Third Division, and their home arena is Mossehallen.
