= Miguel Martins =

Portuguese handball player (born 1997)

Personal information
- Full name: Miguel Soares Martins
- Nationality: Portuguese
- Born: 4 November 1997 (age 28) Porto, Portugal
- Height: 1.93 m (6 ft 4 in)

Sport
- Sport: Handball
- Position: Centre back
- Current club: Dinamo București
- Number: 10

Youth career
- Years: Team
- 2007-2011: AA Águas Santas
- 2011-2013: ADA Maia

Senior clubs
- Years: Team
- 2013–2021: FC Porto
- 2021–2024: OTP Bank-Pick Szeged
- 2024–2025: Aalborg Håndbold
- 2025–: Dinamo Bucuresti
National team
| Years | Team | Apps | (Gls) |
| 2016– | Portugal | 111 | (250) |
- Updated on 15 February 2025

Miguel Soares Martins (pronounced [miˈɣɛl mɐɾˈtĩʃ]; born 4 November 1997) is a Portuguese handball player for Dinamo București and the Portuguese national team.

In addition to regular handball, Martins also plays Beach Handball.

== Career ==
Miguel Martins started playing handball at AA Águas Santas. In 2011 he joined Associação Desportiva e Académica da Maia, followed by FC Porto in 2013. In the 2013-14 and 2014-15 seasons he primarily played for the youth teams, but acted as a backup for the first team. From 2015 he was permanently part of the senior team. Here he won the Portuguese League 4 teams, the Portuguese Cup twice and the Supercup once. In total he played 394 games for Porto, scoring 1063 goals.

In 2021 he joined Hungarian OTP Bank-Pick Szeged.

He represented Portugal at the 2020 European Men's Handball Championship, the 2021 Olympics and the 2021 World Championship.

He was excluded from 2025 World Men's Handball Championship due to accusations of doping by having unnatural levels of testosterone. A month later he was cleared of all charges and could continue the season at Aalborg Håndbold. Three days after being cleared, he won the Danish Cup with Aalborg Håndbold, beating SønderjyskE Håndbold in the semifinal and Bjerringbro-Silkeborg in the final. His team mate Simon Hald dedicated the win to Martins, calling the entire process unfair.

At the end of February 2025 he announced his intention to leave Aalborg Håndbold at the end of the 2025 season, over concerns about playing time. Instead he joined Dinamo Bukarest.

== Honours ==
FC Porto

- Portuguese League: 2013–14, 2014–15, 2018–19, 2020–21
- Portuguese Cup: 2018–19, 2020–21
- Portuguese Super Cup: 2014, 2019

OTP Bank - Pick Szeged

- Hungarian League: 2021–22
