= Samir Bellahcene =

French handball player (born 1995)

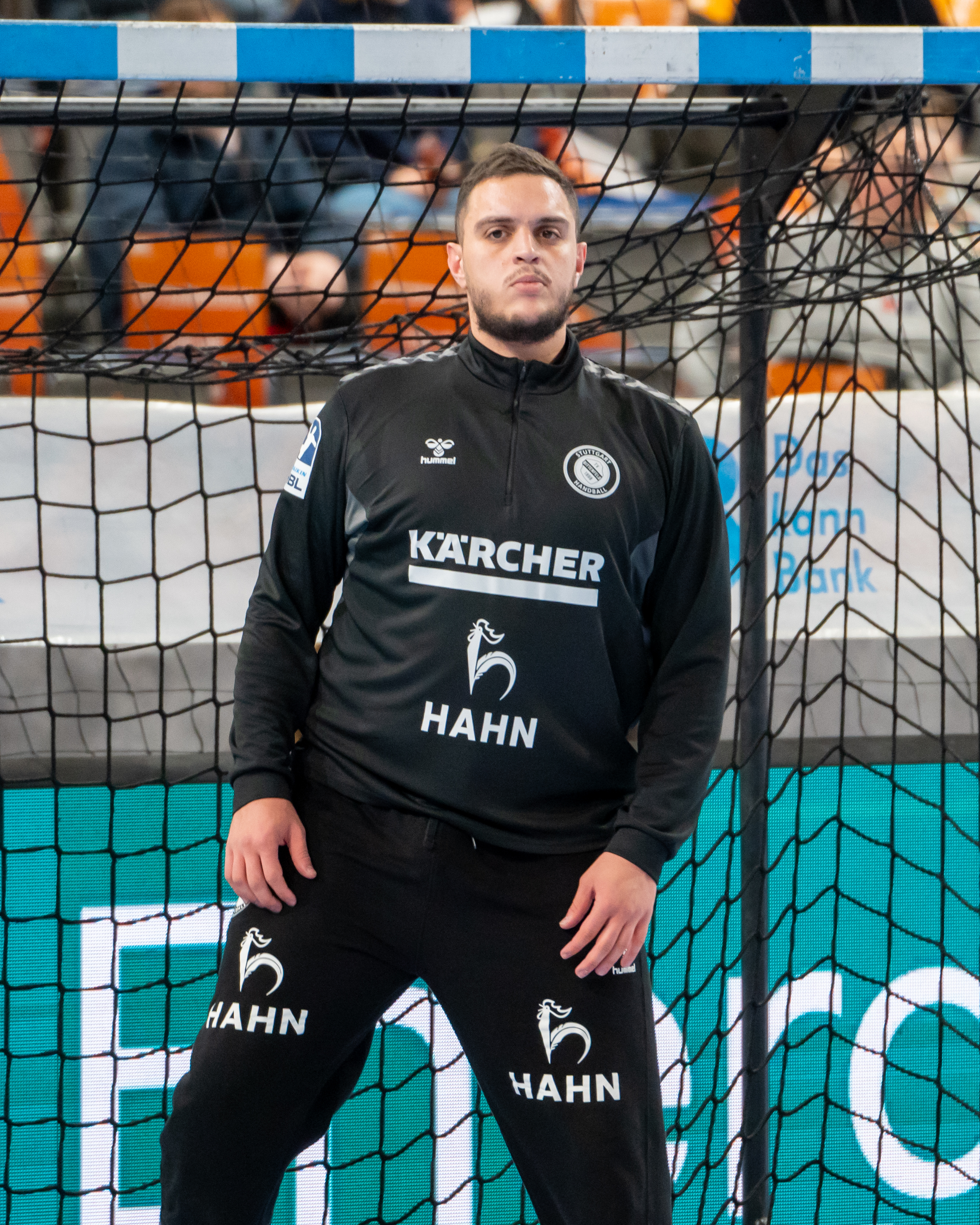
- Bellahcene in 2024

Personal information
- Nationality: French
- Born: 20 February 1995 (age 31) Montpellier, France
- Height: 1.89 m (6 ft 2 in)

Sport
- Sport: Handball
- Position: Goalkeeper
- Current club: Dinamo București
- Number: 34

Senior clubs
- Years: Team
- 2012–2017: Montpellier HB
- 2017–2018: Massy Essonne Handball
- 2018–2023: USDK Dunkerque
- 2023–2024: THW Kiel
- 2024–2025: TVB Stuttgart
- 2025–: Dinamo București
National team
Years	Team	Apps	(Gls)
2023–2025	France	12	(1)
Medal record
World Championship
Bronze medal – third place	2025 Croatia/Denmark/Norway
European Championship
Gold medal – first place	2024 Germany
- Updated on 12 November 2024

Samir Bellahcene (born 20 February 1995) is a French professional handball player who plays as a goalkeeper for Dinamo București.

== Career ==
Bellahcene was first called up to the France national team in April 2023.

In September he moved to Handball-Bundesliga club THW Kiel from USDK Dunkerque after Kiel's Vincent Gérard had sustained a long-term injury.

Bellahcene joined THW Kiel's league rivals TVB Stuttgart in November 2024.

At the 2025 World Championship he won bronze medals with France, losing to Croatia in the semifinal and beating Portugal in the third place playoff.

Bellahcene signed a two-year contract with Romanian club Dinamo București in June 2025.
