= Ionuț Ciprian Iancu =

Romanian handball player (born 1994)

Ionuț Iancu
Personal information
- Full name: Ionuț Ciprian Iancu
- Nationality: Romanian
- Born: 18 February 1994 (age 32) Ploiești, Romania
- Height: 1.95 m (6 ft 5 in)

Sport
- Sport: Handball
- Position: Goalkeeper
- Current club: Dinamo București
- Number: 17

Senior clubs
- Years: Team
- 2012-2013: HCM Constanța
- 2013-2017: CSM București
- 2017-2018: Tatabánya KC
- 2018–2021: HC Dobrogea Sud
- 2021–2024: CSA Steaua Bucuresti
- 2024–: Dinamo București
National team
- Years: Team
- –: Romania
Medal record
World University Championship
Gold medal – first place	2016 Spain	Team
Men's handball
Representing Romania
Liga Națională
Gold medal – first place	2013 Constanța	HCM Constanța
Gold medal – first place	2025 București	Dinamo București
Gold medal – first place	2026 București	Dinamo București
Silver medal – second place	2015 Constanța	HCM Constanța
Silver medal – second place	2015 București	CSM București
Silver medal – second place	2016 București	CSM București
Silver medal – second place	2017 București	CSM București
Nemzeti Bajnokság I
Bronze medal – third place	2018 Tatabánya	Grundfos Tatabánya

Ionuț Ciprian Iancu (born 18 February 1994) is a Romanian handballer who plays as a goalkeeper for Dinamo București and the Romania national team.

== Achievements ==
- Liga Națională:
  - Gold Medalist: 2013, 2025, 2026
  - Silver Medalist: 2015, 2016, 2017
- Cupa României:
  - Winner: 2013, 2016
- Nemzeti Bajnokság I:
  - Bronze Medalist: 2018

== Individual awards ==
- World University Championship Best Goalkeeper: 2016
- Gala Premiilor Handbalului Românesc Liga Națională Goalkeeper of the Season: 2019
- FRH Romanian Handballer of the Year: 2026
