= Branko Vujović =

Montenegrin handball player (born 1998)

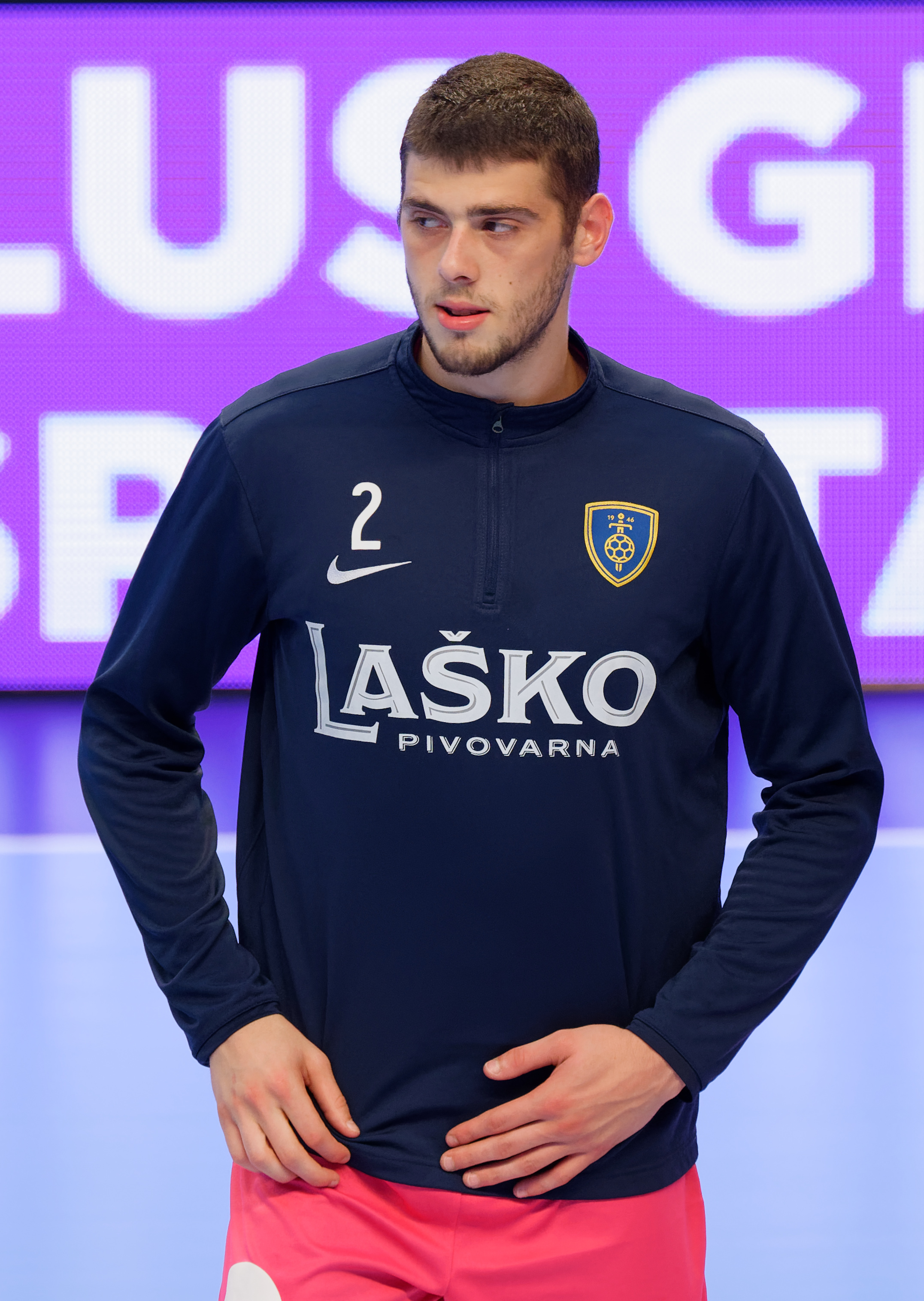

Personal information
- Nationality: Montenegrin
- Born: 20 April 1998 (age 28) Nikšić, FR Yugoslavia
- Height: 1.94 m (6 ft 4 in)

Sport
- Sport: Handball
- Position: Right back
- Current club: Dinamo București
- Number: 2

Youth career
- Years: Team
- 2012–2015: RK Sutjeska

Senior clubs
- Years: Team
- 2015–2024: Barlinek Industria Kielce
- 2017–2019: → RK Celje
- 2022–2024: → TSV Hannover-Burgdorf
- 2024–: Dinamo București
- 2025: → Zamalek
National team
Years	Team	Apps	(Gls)
2015–	Montenegro	54	(237)

Branko Vujović (born 20 April 1998) is a Montenegrin handball player for Dinamo București and the Montenegrin national team.

He represented Montenegro at the 2020 European Men's Handball Championship.
