= CS Dinamo București (men's handball) =

Romanian handball club in Bucharest

- Full name: Clubul Sportiv Dinamo București
- Nickname: Câinii Roşii (The Red Dogs)
- Short name: Dinamo
- Founded: 1953; 73 years ago
- Arena: Sala Polivalentă Dinamo (domestic matches); Sala Polivalentă (international matches)
- Capacity: 2,538; 5,300
- President: (Romania) Ionuț Popa
- Head coach: (Portugal) Paulo Pereira
- League: Liga Națională
- 2025–26: Liga Națională, 1st of 14 (champions)
- Club colours
Home	Away

Clubul Sportiv Dinamo București is a Romanian professional handball club based in Bucharest, that competes in the Liga Națională, the top flight of Romanian handball. Nicknamed "the Red Dogs", the club was founded in 1948. The club's home ground is the Sala Polivalentă Dinamo in Sector 2, to which it moved in 2013. Dinamo București are among Romania's most successful clubs, having won over twenty competitive honours, including 22 top-flight titles, 10 Romanian Cups, 9 Romanian Supercups, and 1 EHF Champions League. Dinamo București has rivalry with Steaua București.

Location of Dinamo București

== Honours ==
=== Domestic competitions ===
- National League:
  - Winners (22): 1959, 1960, 1961, 1962, 1964, 1965, 1966, 1978, 1986, 1995, 1997, 2005, 2016, 2017, 2018, 2019, 2021, 2022, 2023, 2024, 2025, 2026
  - Runners-up (22): 1963, 1967, 1968, 1969, 1970, 1971, 1972, 1974, 1975, 1976, 1977, 1982, 1983, 1984, 1988, 1989, 1990, 1991, 2002, 2003, 2004, 2006
  - Third place (6): 1973, 1979, 1981, 2001, 2007, 2009, 2015
- Romanian Cup:
  - Winners (10): 1979, 1982, 1988, 2017, 2020, 2021, 2022, 2024, 2025, 2026
- Romanian Super Cup:
  - Winners (9): 2016, 2018, 2019, 2020, 2022, 2023, 2024, 2025, 2026

=== International competitions ===
- EHF Champions League:
  - Winners (1): 1965
  - Runners-up (1): 1963
  - Third place (4): 1959, 1960, 1967, 1979
- EHF Cup Winners' Cup:
  - Runners-up (1): 1983
  - Third place (1): 1989
- EHF Cup:
  - Third place (2): 2004, 2024
- Double

Winners (2): 2016–17, 2020–21

CS Dinamo București was founded in 1948 and is one of the most successful Romanian clubs in European handball. Dinamo won the European Champions Cup in 1965 and finished as runners-up in 1963.

=== European record ===
Season	Competition	Round	Club	Home	Away	Aggregate / position	
1959–60	European Champions Cup	R16	(Poland) Sparta Katowice	14–11	13–13	27–24	
1959–60	European Champions Cup	QF	(Czechoslovakia) Dukla Prague	23–22	—N/a	23–22	
1959–60	European Champions Cup	SF	(West Germany) Frisch Auf Göppingen	8–10	—N/a	8–10	
1961–62	European Champions Cup	R16	(East Germany) SC DHfK Leipzig	7–9	—N/a	7–9	
1962–63	European Champions Cup	R16	(Hungary) Budapest Spartacus	24–11	—N/a	24–11	
1962–63	European Champions Cup	QF	(Socialist Federal Republic of Yugoslavia) RK Zagreb	22–8	9–8	31–16	
1962–63	European Champions Cup	SF	(Denmark) IK Skovbakken	14–10	14–12	28–22	
1962–63	European Champions Cup	F	(Czechoslovakia) Dukla Prague	13–15 (a.e.t.)	—N/a	Runner-up	
1964–65	European Champions Cup; Winner	R16	(East Germany) ASK Vorwärts Berlin	17–14	—N/a	17–14	
1964–65	European Champions Cup; Winner	QF	(Sweden) Redbergslids Göteborg	26–11	24–11	50–22	
1964–65	European Champions Cup; Winner	SF	(Switzerland) Grasshoppers Zürich	19–11	—N/a	19–11	
1964–65	European Champions Cup; Winner	F	(Socialist Federal Republic of Yugoslavia) Medveščak Zagreb	13–11	—N/a	Winner	
1965–66	European Champions Cup	R16	(Netherlands) HV Sittardia	21–16	—N/a	21–16	
1965–66	European Champions Cup	QF	(Socialist Federal Republic of Yugoslavia) Partizan Bjelovar	18–14	14–18	32–32 (better goal ratio)	
1965–66	European Champions Cup	SF	(East Germany) SC DHfK Leipzig	12–11	13–16	25–27	
1966–67	European Champions Cup	R16	(Poland) Wybrzeże Gdańsk	23–13	16–14	39–27	
1966–67	European Champions Cup	QF	(Denmark) HG Copenhagen	24–16	16–21	40–37	
1966–67	European Champions Cup	SF	(Czechoslovakia) Dukla Prague	10–15	7–10	17–25	
1978–79	European Champions Cup	R16	(Spain) Calpisa Alicante	28–14	20–24	48–38	
1978–79	European Champions Cup	QF	(Czechoslovakia) Dukla Prague	—N/a	—N/a	Qualified	
1978–79	European Champions Cup	SF	(West Germany) TV Großwallstadt	17–23	18–31	35–54	
1982–83	European Cup Winners' Cup; Runner-up	PR	(Israel) Maccabi Petah Tikva	37–22	27–12	64–34	
1982–83	European Cup Winners' Cup; Runner-up	R16	(Netherlands) HV De Gazellen Doetinchem	27–24	25–17	52–41	
1982–83	European Cup Winners' Cup; Runner-up	QF	(Austria) ATSE Waagner Biro Graz	26–20	31–27	57–47	
1982–83	European Cup Winners' Cup; Runner-up	SF	(Socialist Federal Republic of Yugoslavia) Željezničar Niš	25–22	27–26	52–48	
1982–83	European Cup Winners' Cup; Runner-up	F	(Soviet Union) SKA Minsk	22–34	26–24	48–58; Runner-up	
1988–89	European Cup Winners' Cup	R16	(Soviet Union) CSKA Moscow	22–17	21–22	43–39	
1988–89	European Cup Winners' Cup	QF	(East Germany) SC Empor Rostock	28–23	22–22	50–45	
1988–89	European Cup Winners' Cup	SF	(France) US Créteil	20–19	20–26	40–45	
1994–95	EHF City Cup	R32	(Azerbaijan) Spartak Baku	10–0	—N/a	10–0	
1994–95	EHF City Cup	R16	(Germany) TUSEM Essen	17–25	19–19	36–44	
1995–96	EHF Champions League	QR	(North Macedonia) Borec Titov Veles	26–18	18–27	44–45	
1996–97	EHF City Cup	R32	(Ukraine) SKA Lviv	31–23	34–19	65–42	
1996–97	EHF City Cup	R16	(Norway) Sandefjord TIF	24–17	15–29	39–46	
1997–98	EHF Champions League	QR	(Faroe Islands) Vestmanna IF	16–17	25–20	41–37	
1997–98	EHF Champions League	R32	(Czech Republic) CS Cabot Zubří	26–26	22–35	48–61	
2001–02	EHF Cup	R1	(Cyprus) SPE Strovolos Nicosia	26–20	18–23	44–43	
2001–02	EHF Cup	R2	(Luxembourg) HC Berchem	32–30	35–26	67–56	
2001–02	EHF Cup	R3	(Netherlands) Fiqas Aalsmeer	32–24	24–26	56–50	
2001–02	EHF Cup	R4	(Germany) THW Kiel	21–31	27–33	48–64	
2002–03	EHF Cup	R1	(Romania) CS Baracuda Handbal	37–21	24–26	61–47	
2002–03	EHF Cup	R2	(Poland) Śląsk Wrocław	33–26	17–29	50–55	
2003–04	EHF Cup	R2	(Moldova) Olimpus-85 Chișinău	41–26	35–25	76–51	
2003–04	EHF Cup	R3	(Ukraine) Shakhtar Akademiya Donetsk	31–32	34–30	65–62	
2003–04	EHF Cup	R16	(Finland) BK-46 Karis	41–26	35–28	76–54	
2003–04	EHF Cup	QF	(Germany) HSG Nordhorn	30–28	33–34	63–62	
2003–04	EHF Cup	SF	(Spain) BM Altea	30–30	25–31	55–61	
2004–05	EHF Cup	R3	(Greece) Filippos Verias	28–28	24–23	52–51	
2004–05	EHF Cup	R16	(Sweden) IFK Skövde HK	29–31	28–28	57–59	
2005–06	EHF Champions League	QR	(Turkey) Beşiktaş Istanbul	35–36	41–34	76–70	
2005–06	EHF Champions League	GS	(Spain) BM Ciudad Real	24–29	17–40	4th	
2005–06	EHF Champions League	GS	(Hungary) MKB Veszprém KC	27–38	27–37	4th	
2005–06	EHF Champions League	GS	(Slovakia) Tatran Prešov	28–24	25–30	4th	
2006–07	EHF Cup Winners' Cup	R2	(Luxembourg) HB Esch	36–27	34–30	70–57	
2006–07	EHF Cup Winners' Cup	R3	(Portugal) Sporting CP	35–29	30–27	65–56	
2006–07	EHF Cup Winners' Cup	R16	(Romania) HCM Constanța	27–17	20–31	47–48	
2007–08	EHF Cup	R2	(Greece) AEK Athens	36–22	29–30	65–52	
2007–08	EHF Cup	R3	(Hungary) Dunaferr SE	27–36	22–32	49–68	
2015–16	EHF Cup	Q1	(Romania) Energia Târgu Jiu	38–24	24–24	62–48	
2015–16	EHF Cup	Q2	(Greece) AC Diomidis Argous	35–20	26–21	61–41	
2015–16	EHF Cup	Q3	(Slovenia) RK Maribor Branik	31–25	26–27	57–52	
2015–16	EHF Cup	GS	(Spain) Fraikin BM Granollers	26–27	29–28	3rd	
2015–16	EHF Cup	GS	(Denmark) Aalborg Håndbold	28–25	28–28	3rd	
2015–16	EHF Cup	GS	(Germany) SC Magdeburg	33–34	22–39	3rd	
2016–17	EHF Champions League	GS	(Denmark) TTH Holstebro	32–32	32–32	5th	
2016–17	EHF Champions League	GS	(Ukraine) Motor Zaporizhzhia	35–31	27–35	5th	
2016–17	EHF Champions League	GS	(Portugal) ABC/UMinho	35–29	32–34	5th	
2016–17	EHF Champions League	GS	(Turkey) Beşiktaş Mogaz	26–26	27–29	5th	
2016–17	EHF Champions League	GS	(France) HBC Nantes	26–27	24–26	5th	
2017–18	EHF Champions League	GS	(Denmark) Skjern Håndbold	23–36	28–39	6th	
2017–18	EHF Champions League	GS	(Spain) Abanca Ademar León	24–28	29–32	6th	
2017–18	EHF Champions League	GS	(Norway) Elverum Håndball	33–34	32–40	6th	
2017–18	EHF Champions League	GS	(Slovenia) RK Gorenje Velenje	26–27	29–33	6th	
2017–18	EHF Champions League	GS	(Switzerland) Kadetten Schaffhausen	29–28	25–27	6th	
2018–19	EHF Champions League	GS	(Norway) Elverum Håndball	26–24	28–29	1st	
2018–19	EHF Champions League	GS	(Spain) Abanca Ademar León	35–30	28–31	1st	
2018–19	EHF Champions League	GS	(Switzerland) Wacker Thun	35–34	33–29	1st	
2018–19	EHF Champions League	GS	(Finland) Riihimäen Cocks	24–22	32–31	1st	
2018–19	EHF Champions League	GS	(Poland) Orlen Wisła Płock	24–21	28–29	1st	
2018–19	EHF Champions League	Play-offs	(Portugal) Sporting CP	26–27	31–32	57–59	
2019–20	EHF Champions League	GS	(Switzerland) Kadetten Schaffhausen	27–26	28–28	1st	
2019–20	EHF Champions League	GS	(Sweden) IFK Kristianstad	28–25	29–29	1st	
2019–20	EHF Champions League	GS	(Denmark) GOG Håndbold	35–28	32–31	1st	
2019–20	EHF Champions League	GS	(Russia) Chekhovskiye Medvedi	34–23	30–20	1st	
2019–20	EHF Champions League	GS	(Poland) Orlen Wisła Płock	29–20	26–26	1st	
2019–20	EHF Champions League	GS	(Portugal) Sporting CP	26–24	26–25	1st	
2019–20	EHF Champions League	Play-offs	Competition cancelled	—N/a	—N/a	Cancelled	—N/a
2020–21	EHF European League	GS	(Portugal) Sporting CP	25–27	32–31	5th	
2020–21	EHF European League	GS	(Sweden) IFK Kristianstad	28–29	22–31	5th	
2020–21	EHF European League	GS	(Germany) Füchse Berlin	26–26	29–33	5th	
2020–21	EHF European League	GS	(France) USAM Nîmes Gard	29–27	29–32	5th	
2020–21	EHF European League	GS	(Slovakia) Tatran Prešov	32–30	27–32	5th	
2021–22	EHF Champions League	GS	(Poland) Łomża Vive Kielce	32–29	29–34	8th	
2021–22	EHF Champions League	GS	(France) Paris Saint-Germain Handball	31–39	30–41	8th	
2021–22	EHF Champions League	GS	(Portugal) FC Porto	26–27	32–31	8th	
2021–22	EHF Champions League	GS	(Spain) Barça	30–35	32–36	8th	
2021–22	EHF Champions League	GS	(Ukraine) Motor Zaporizhzhia	33–29	27–28	8th	
2021–22	EHF Champions League	GS	(Hungary) Telekom Veszprém HC	31–29	32–47	8th	
2021–22	EHF Champions League	GS	(Germany) SG Flensburg-Handewitt	20–28	30–37	8th	
2022–23	EHF Champions League	GS	(Germany) SC Magdeburg	28–30	33–34	5th	
2022–23	EHF Champions League	GS	(Denmark) GOG Håndbold	30–27	38–38	5th	
2022–23	EHF Champions League	GS	(Hungary) Telekom Veszprém HC	31–31	30–33	5th	
2022–23	EHF Champions League	GS	(Croatia) HC PPD Zagreb	27–27	29–28	5th	
2022–23	EHF Champions League	GS	(Poland) Orlen Wisła Płock	32–27	28–26	5th	
2022–23	EHF Champions League	GS	(Portugal) FC Porto	32–27	23–32	5th	
2022–23	EHF Champions League	GS	(France) Paris Saint-Germain Handball	29–36	26–33	5th	
2022–23	EHF Champions League	Play-offs	(Germany) THW Kiel	28–41	32–31	60–72	
2023–24	EHF European League	GS	(Bosnia and Herzegovina) HC Izviđač	52–24	40–24	2nd	
2023–24	EHF European League	GS	(Germany) Füchse Berlin	32–33	30–33	2nd	
2023–24	EHF European League	GS	(France) Chambéry Savoie	36–33	28–21	2nd	
2023–24	EHF European League	MR	(Romania) CSM Constanța	33–23	33–25	2nd	
2023–24	EHF European League	MR	(Portugal) Sporting CP	27–31	33–35	2nd	
2023–24	EHF European League	Play-offs	(Denmark) Bjerringbro-Silkeborg	37–34	27–24	64–58	
2023–24	EHF European League	QF	(Denmark) Skjern Håndbold	28–27	38–34	66–61	
2023–24	EHF European League	SF	(Germany) SG Flensburg-Handewitt	32–38	—N/a	32–38	
2023–24	EHF European League	Third place	(Germany) Rhein-Neckar Löwen	31–32	—N/a	4th	
2024–25	EHF Champions League	GS	(Denmark) Fredericia Håndbold	37–28	37–32	6th	
2024–25	EHF Champions League	GS	(Poland) Orlen Wisła Płock	26–27	28–26	6th	
2024–25	EHF Champions League	GS	(North Macedonia) Eurofarm Pelister	34–25	24–25	6th	
2024–25	EHF Champions League	GS	(Hungary) ONE Veszprém HC	26–33	24–36	6th	
2024–25	EHF Champions League	GS	(France) Paris Saint-Germain Handball	33–40	32–35	6th	
2024–25	EHF Champions League	GS	(Portugal) Sporting CP	33–29	25–34	6th	
2024–25	EHF Champions League	GS	(Germany) Füchse Berlin	38–31	29–38	6th	
2024–25	EHF Champions League	Play-offs	(Germany) SC Magdeburg	26–30	29–35	55–65	
2025–26	EHF Champions League	GS	(Portugal) Sporting CP	30–33	29–30	8th	
2025–26	EHF Champions League	GS	(Norway) Kolstad Håndball	33–23	28–31	8th	
2025–26	EHF Champions League	GS	(Hungary) ONE Veszprém HC	27–30	28–35	8th	
2025–26	EHF Champions League	GS	(Germany) Füchse Berlin	21–27	31–32	8th	
2025–26	EHF Champions League	GS	(Denmark) Aalborg Håndbold	27–30	28–34	8th	
2025–26	EHF Champions League	GS	(Poland) Industria Kielce	24–28	32–34	8th	
2025–26	EHF Champions League	GS	(France) HBC Nantes	29–28	28–35	8th	
2026–27	EHF Champions League	Group E	(Spain) Barça			In progress	
2026–27	EHF Champions League	Group E	(France) Montpellier Handball			In progress	
2026–27	EHF Champions League	Group E	(Denmark) SAH Aarhus			In progress	

=== EHF ranking ===
As of 25 June 2026

Rank	Team	Points
12	(France) Paris Saint-Germain Handball	275
13	(Poland) Industria Kielce	272
14	(Germany) MT Melsungen	236
15	(Poland) Orlen Wisła Płock	236
16	(Denmark) GOG Håndbold	219
17	(Romania) Dinamo București	196
18	(Portugal) FC Porto	167
19	(Croatia) HC Zagreb	140
20	(Greece) Olympiacos SFP	126
21	(Croatia) RK Nexe	125

== Kits ==
HOME
2013–14	2015–16	2016–17	2017–18	2020-21	2021–23

AWAY
2015–16	2017–18	2019–21	2021–22	2022–23

THIRD
2015–16	2021–22	2022–23

== Team ==
=== Current squad ===
Squad for the 2026–27 season

Goalkeepers

- 1 (Romania) Ionuț Iancu
- 21 (Sweden) Oscar Sävinger
- 34 (France) Samir Bellahcene

Left Wingers

- 23 (Denmark) Mads Emil Lenbroch
- 28 (Spain) Alex Pascual Garcia

Right Wingers

- 5 (Romania) Ionuț Nistor
- 55 (Ukraine) Andrii Akimenko

Line players

- 4 (Portugal) Victor Iturriza
- 6 (Romania) Călin Dedu
- 33 (Slovenia) Lan Grbić

Left Backs

- 7 (Romania) Andrei Buzle
- 9 (Hungary) Andrej Pergel
- 22 (Cuba) Pedro Valdés
- 37 (Brazil) Haniel Langaro
- 94 (Romania) Robert Militaru (c)

Central Backs

- 10 (Portugal) Miguel Martins
- 35 (Slovenia) Andraž Makuc

Right Backs

- 2 (Montenegro) Branko Vujović
- 57 (Brazil) Vinícios Carvalho
- 77 (Moldova) Roman Dodică

=== Transfers ===
Transfers for the 2027–28 season

Joining

- (Serbia) Mijajlo Marsenić (LP) from (Germany) Füchse Berlin

Leaving

Transfers for the 2026–27 season

Joining

- (Portugal) Victor Iturriza (LP) from Kuwait SC
- (Slovenia) Andraž Makuc (CB) from (Slovenia) RK Celje
- (Slovenia) Lan Grbić (LP) from (Slovenia) RK Trimo Trebnje
- (Hungary) Andrej Pergel (LB) from (Spain) BM Logroño La Rioja
- (Brazil) Vinícios Carvalho (RB) from (France) C' Chartres MHB
- (Denmark) Mads Lenbroch (LW) from (Denmark) Bjerringbro-Silkeborg
- (Sweden) Oscar Sävinger (GK) from (Sweden) IK Sävehof

Leaving

- (Serbia) Vladimir Cupara (GK) to (Germany) HBW Balingen-Weilstetten
- (Hungary) Miklós Rosta (LP) to (Hungary) OTP Bank – Pick Szeged
- (Denmark) Frederik Ladefoged (LP) to (France) Paris Saint-Germain
- (Israel) Yoav Lumbroso (CB) to (Serbia) RK Partizan
- (France) Tom Pelayo (RB) to (France) Limoges Handball
- (Romania) Andrei Nicușor Negru (LW) to (Romania) CSM București

=== Transfer history ===
Transfers for the 2025–26 season

Joining

- (Portugal) Miguel Martins (CB) from (Denmark) Aalborg Håndbold
- (France) Samir Bellahcene (GK) from (Germany) TVB Stuttgart
- (France) Tom Pelayo (RB) from (France) US Dunkerque HB
- (Cuba) Pedro Valdés (LB) from (Portugal) FC Porto
- (Moldova) Roman Dodica (RB) from (Romania) CSM București
- (Romania) Andrei Buzle (LB) from (Romania) CSM Constanța
- (Romania) Ionuț Nistor (RW) from (Romania) CSM Constanța

Leaving

- (Egypt) Ali Zein (LB) to (Hungary) ONE Veszprém
- (Czech Republic) Stanislav Kašpárek (RB) to (Qatar) Al Arabi SC
- (Portugal) André Gomes (LB) to (Japan) Toyota Auto Body Brave Kings
- (Iceland) Haukur Þrastarson (CB) to (Germany) Rhein-Neckar Löwen
- (Serbia) Darko Đukić (RW) to (North Macedonia) GRK Ohrid
- (Romania) (Croatia) Ante Kuduz (LB) to (France) Dijon Métropole Handball
- (Romania) Tudor Buguleț (RW) to (Romania) CSM Constanța
- (Romania) Ramon Șomlea (LB) (to ?)
- (Romania) Alin Cozmaciuc (GK) on loan at (Spain) Helvetia Anaitasuna

=== Staff ===
Staff for the 2025–26 season

- (Spain) Sport Director: David Barrufet
- (France) Team Manager: Cédric Sorhaindo
- (Portugal) Head Coach: Paulo Pereira
- (Portugal) Assistant Coach: Jorge Sousa
- (Romania) Assistant Coach: Sebastian Bota
- (Spain) Goalkeeping Coach: Luis Santos
- (Romania) Physiotherapist: Victor Semen
- (Romania) Physiotherapist: Tudor Cornea
- (Denmark) Physical Trainer: Thomas Torabi
- (Romania) External Coordinator: Ovidiu Semen

== Notable former players ==
- (Romania) Ion Mocanu
- (Romania) Petre Ivănescu
- (Romania) Mircea Costache II
- (Romania) Cristian Zaharia
- (Romania) Rudi Prisăcaru
- (Romania) Ioan Moser
- (Romania) Mihai Redl
- (Romania) Ioan Bogolea
- (Romania) Virgil Hnat
- (Romania) Ghiță Licu
- (Romania) Robert Licu
- (Romania) Mircea Grabovschi
- (Romania) Marin Dan
- (Romania) Adrian Cosma
- (Romania) Cornel Penu
- (Romania) Valentin Samungi
- (Romania) Cornel Durău
- (Romania) Alexandru Buligan
- (Romania) Gheorghe Covaciu
- (Romania) Gheorghe Dogărescu
- (Romania) Eliodor Voica
- (Romania) Vasile Oprea
- (Romania) Rareș Jurcă
- (Romania) Marian Cozma
- (France) Ibrahim Diaw
- (France) Hugo Descat
- (France) Cédric Sorhaindo
- (Iran) Sajjad Esteki
- (Russia) Vitaly Komogorov
- (Sweden) Gustav Rydergård
