= Paulo Pereira (handballer) =

Portuguaise handball coach (born 1965)

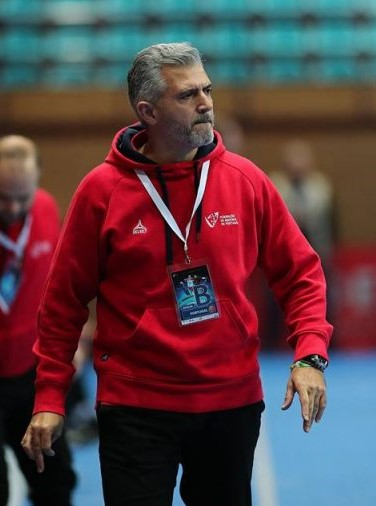
- Pereira in 2018

Personal information
- Full name: Paulo Jorge de Moura Pereira
- Nationality: Portuguese
- Born: 21 March 1965 (age 61) Amarante, Portugal

Sport
- Sport: Handball
- Current club: Portugal; Dinamo București

Teams managed
- Years: Team
- 1996–1999: CPN Porto
- 2003–2006: FC Porto
- 2006–2008: CB Cangas
- 2008–2009: Atletico Sport Aviação
- 2009–2010: Angola
- 2010–2013: CD Primeiro de Agosto
- 2013–2015: Tunisia
- 2015–2016: Espérance Sportive de Tunis
- 2016–2019: Portugal
- 2017–2019: CSM București
- 2019–: Portugal
- 2022: Al Kuwait SC
- 2024–2025: RK Celje
- 2025–: Dinamo București

Paulo Pereira (born 21 March 1965) is a Portuguese handball coach of the Portuguese men's national team.

In 2016, the Portuguese Handball Federation appointed him as the new head coach of the Portugal national team, succeeding Rolando Freitas. His current contract extends until 2025.

He is best known for transforming the Portugal national team into a competitive force on the international stage, leading them to a 6th-place finish at the 2020 European Men's Handball Championship, and their first-ever appearance at the 2021 Tokyo Olympics, where they placed 9th. .

In 2025, he led the Portugal team to reach the semifinals of the World Championship for the first time in history. They lost the semifinals to Denmark and the third place playoff to France by a narrow one-point margin.

Three Portuguese players were selected for the 2025 IHF Men's World Championship All-Star team:

- Best Centre Back: Martim Costa.
- Best Line Player: Victor Iturriza.
- Best Young Player Presented by LIDL: Francisco Costa.

In recognition of his historical achievements, Paulo Pereira won the title of “Coach of the Year” at Sports Gala organized by the National Sports Federation. He won as well the ‘’technical’’ award of the eighth edition of the Bento Pessoa National Awards, under the category of ‘’Entities of National Scope’’.

At the 2026 European Men's Handball Championship he guidedthe Portugal team to 5th place; their best ever finish at a European Championship.

His distinctive ideas of using aggressive, all-in tactics have completely changed the course of the Portugal national team. He is also a psychology aficionado who relies on advanced motivational techniques to optimize the players' efficiency.

== Career ==
Paulo Pereira's career spans over two decades in six countries:

=== Portugal ===
He started his coaching career at a young age, leading the children's team of CD Portugal. In 1996, he became the head coach of the CPN club (A popular club in the vicinity of Porto) and later moved to FC Porto in 1999 as an assistant coach. He was promoted to head coach of FC Porto in the 2002/03 season, replacing Branislav Pokrajac. When he led FC Porto, the team won the championship in 2001/02, 2002/03, and 2003/04, the cup in 2005/06, the Super Cup in 2000/01, and the League Cup in 2003/04 and 2004/05.

=== Spain ===
In 2006, Pereira moved to the Spanish second-division club C.B. Cangas, with whom he finished sixth and eighth in Honor Plata.

=== Angola ===
In 2009, he became Angola's national head coach, leading the team to victory in the 2010 African Women's Handball Championship. He also lead them at the 2009 World Women's Handball Championship, where they finished 11th. At the same time he also coached the Atlético Sport Aviação (ASA) women's team in 2008 and CD Primeiro de Agosto from 2010 to 2013, leading them to win the Angola Women's Handball League Cup in 2011.

=== Tunisia ===
In 2013, Pereira took over the Tunisian women's national handball team. His first tournament was the 2013 World Women's Handball Championship. A year later he won the 2014 African Women's Handball Championship (their first champion win in this tournament since 1976).

In 2015, he coached the Tunisian club Espérance Sportive de Tunis.

=== Back to Portugal ===
In 2016, the Portuguese Handball Federation named him the new head coach for the Portugal national team, then extended his contract until the summer of 2023.

He is best known for leading his national team to their best place in history, reaching the sixth place at the EHF EURO 2020 tournament. A monumental achievement for a team that had not been qualified for the competition for 14 years and over seven times of qualification. He led the team to compete for the first time in the men's Olympic handball tournament at the 2020 Summer Olympics in Tokyo, finishing in ninth place. In 2021, he qualified the team for the World Championship after 17 years of absence (2003) and led them to an all-time best tenth place.

=== Romania ===
From 2017 to 2019, he was the parallel coach of the Romanian club CSM Bucharest, winning the 2018/19 EHF Challenge Cup.

=== Kuwait ===
In June 2022, he took over the Kuwaiti club Al Kuwait SC, winning the Asian Champions League in the same month.

== Major achievements for the Portuguese men's national team ==
- Qualified for the world championship of 2023 (Sweden/Poland).
- Qualified for Euro 2022 (Hungary and Slovakia).
- Qualified for the Olympic Games of Tokyo, the first time in the history of a collective sport in Portugal (March 2021, Montpellier).
- Best classification ever in the world of male seniors (10° classified — Egypt 2021).
- Qualified for the world championship of 2021 (Egypt) after 17 years of absence.
- Qualified for the Paris Olympic qualification tournament (April 2020 postponed to March 2021).
- Best classification ever in a European (2020) senior male (6th classified) (Norway, Sweden, Austria).
- Qualified for the euro 2020 male seniors after 14 years of absence.
- First ever semifinals for the Portuguese National team at the 2025 World Championship
- Best ever position at a European Championship for Portugal (5th)

== Honors ==
=== International competitions ===
- Asian Club League Handball Championship

Champions (Kuwait SC): 2022

- Men's EHF European Cup

(Romania) Champions CSM București (men's handball): 2018–19

- African Handball Cup Winners' Cup

(Tunisia) Champions Espérance Sportive de Tunis (handball): 2015

- African Women's Handball Championship

(Tunisia) Champions : 2014
(Angola) Champions : 2010

- IHF World Women's Handball Championship

(Tunisia) President’s Cup Winner : 2013

=== National competitions ===
- 2021 – 2022 Kuwaiti Handball League – Al Kuwait SC (Men’s)
- 2011 – 2012 Angola woman’s Super Cup Winner – Clube Desportivo 1º de Agosto
- 2010 – 2011 Angola woman’s Championship Winner – Clube Desportivo 1º de Agosto
- 2005 – 2006 Portuguese Cup Winner – FC Porto (Men’s)
- 2004 – 2005 Portuguese League Cup Winner – FC Porto (Men’s)
- 2003 – 2004 Portuguese Championship Winner & Portuguese League Cup Winner – FC Porto (Men’s)
- 2002 – 2003 Portuguese Championship Winner & Portuguese Super Cup Winner – FC Porto (Men’s)
- 2001 – 2002 Portuguese Championship Winner – FC Porto (Men’s)
- 2000 – 2001 Portuguese Super Cup Winner – FC Porto (Men’s)

=== Individual ===
- Portuguese "Coach of the Year": (allocated by the Portuguese Sports Confederation)
- Bento Pessoa National Awards (The technical Award)
