= 1964–65 European Cup (handball) =

European men's club handball tournament

European Cup
- 1964–65

Tournament information
- Sport: Handball

Final positions
- Champions: Dinamo București

The 1964–65 European Cup was the sixth edition of Europe's premier club handball tournament.

== Knockout stage ==
=== Round 1 ===
Team 1	Score	Team 2
ROC Flemallois (Belgium)	9–27	(Switzerland) Grasshoppers Zürich
Operatie-55 Den Haag (Netherlands)	w.o.	(Luxembourg) HB Dudelange
US Ivry (France)	18–13	(Portugal) FC Porto
Rapid Wien (Austria)	w.o.	(Socialist Federal Republic of Yugoslavia) Medveščak Zagreb
AZS Katowice (Poland)	22–17	(Hungary) Budapest Honvéd

=== Round 2 ===
Team 1	Score	Team 2
Dinamo București (Romania)	17–14	(East Germany) ASK Vorwärts Berlin
Redbergslids Göteborg (Sweden)	25–20	(Iceland) Fram Reykjavik
Grasshoppers Zürich (Switzerland)	20–15	(Spain) Atlético Madrid
Berliner SV 1892 (Germany)	21–13	(Norway) SV Arild Oslo
US Ivry (France)	17–10	(Luxembourg) HB Dudelange
Ajax København (Denmark)	w.o.	(Finland) Union Helsinki
Medveščak Zagreb (Socialist Federal Republic of Yugoslavia)	14–12	(Czechoslovakia) Dukla Prague
Burevestnik Tbilisi (Soviet Union)	32–18	(Poland) AZS Katowice

=== Quarterfinals ===
Team 1	Agg.	Team 2	1st leg	2nd leg
Redbergslids Göteborg (Sweden)	22–50	(Romania) Dinamo București	11–24	11–26
Berliner SV 1892 (Germany)	29–34	(Switzerland) Grasshoppers Zürich	14–18	15–16
US Ivry (France)	34–55	(Denmark) Ajax København	19–16	15–39
Medveščak Zagreb (Socialist Federal Republic of Yugoslavia)	34–34	(Soviet Union) Burevestnik Tbilisi	21–13	13–21

=== Semifinals ===
Team 1	Agg.	Team 2	1st leg	2nd leg
Dinamo București (Romania)	19–11	(Switzerland) Grasshoppers Zürich	19–11	
Medveščak Zagreb (Socialist Federal Republic of Yugoslavia)	41–35	(Denmark) Ajax København	20–24	21–11

=== Finals ===
Team 1	Score	Team 2
Dinamo București (Romania)	13–11	(Socialist Federal Republic of Yugoslavia) Medveščak Zagreb
