= 2015–16 EHF Champions League group stage =

The 2015–16 EHF Champions League group stage began on 16 September 2015 and concluded on 6 March 2016. A total of 28 teams competed for 14 places in the knockout stage of the 2015–16 EHF Champions League.

== Draw ==
The draw for the group stage was held on 26 June 2015, 20:00 CEST, in the Vienna city centre. The 28 teams were drawn into four groups, two containing eight teams (Groups A and B) and two containing six teams (Groups C and D), with the restriction that teams from the same national association cannot face each other in the same group.

The group stage line-up was confirmed on 20 June 2015, allocating 16 teams to Groups A and B and the remaining 12 teams (11 + winner of qualification stage) to Groups C and D. The seedings were published on 24 June 2015, distributing the teams from Groups A and B into eight pots of two and the teams from Groups C and D into six pots of two. Title holders Barcelona Lassa and German champions THW Kiel were seeded in pot 1 of Groups A and B, while the winner of the qualification tournament was placed in pot 6 of Groups C and D.

Because Germany qualified three teams, Flensburg-Handewitt (seeded in pot 8 of Groups A and B) were the only exception to the country restriction rule, as they were necessarily drawn with one of the other German sides.

Seeding pots for Groups A and B
Pot 1	Pot 2	Pot 3	Pot 4
(Spain) Barcelona Lassa (Germany) THW Kiel	(Hungary) MVM Veszprém (Poland) Vive Tauron Kielce	(France) Paris Saint-Germain (North Macedonia) Vardar	(Denmark) KIF Kolding København (Slovenia) Celje
Pot 5	Pot 6	Pot 7	Pot 8
(Hungary) MOL-Pick Szeged (Poland) Wisła Płock	(Croatia) Zagreb (Germany) Rhein-Neckar Löwen	(Sweden) IFK Kristianstad (Turkey) Beşiktaş	(France) Montpellier (Germany) Flensburg-Handewitt

Seeding pots for Groups C and D
Pot 1	Pot 2	Pot 3
(Spain) Logroño (North Macedonia) Metalurg Skopje	(Belarus) Meshkov Brest (Denmark) Skjern Håndbold	(Russia) Chekhovskiye Medvedi (Ukraine) Motor Zaporizhzhia
Pot 4	Pot 5	Pot 6
(Portugal) Porto (Switzerland) Kadetten Schaffhausen	(Romania) HC Baia Mare (Serbia) Vojvodina	(Slovakia) Tatran Prešov (Norway) Elverum Håndball

Notes

1. ^{TH} Title holders, automatically placed in seeding pot 1 of Groups A and B.
2. ^{QS} Winner of the qualification stage.

== Format ==
In each group, teams played against each other in a double round-robin format, with home and away matches. After completion of the group stage matches, the teams advancing to the knockout stage were determined in the following manner:

- Groups A and B – the top team qualified directly for the quarter-finals, and the five teams ranked 2nd–6th advance to the first knockout round.
- Groups C and D – the top two teams from both groups contested a playoff to determine the last two sides joining the 10 teams from Groups A and B in the first knockout round.

=== Tiebreakers ===
In the group stage, teams were ranked according to points (2 points for a win, 1 point for a draw, 0 points for a loss). After completion of the group stage, if two or more teams have scored the same number of points, the ranking was determined as follows (article 4.3.1, section II of regulations):

1. Highest number of points in matches between the teams directly involved;
2. Superior goal difference in matches between the teams directly involved;
3. Highest number of goals scored in matches between the teams directly involved (or in the away match in case of a two-team tie);
4. Superior goal difference in all matches of the group;
5. Highest number of plus goals in all matches of the group;

If the ranking of one of these teams is determined, the above criteria are consecutively followed until the ranking of all teams is determined. If no ranking can be determined, a decision shall be obtained by EHF through drawing of lots.

During the group stage, only criteria 4–5 apply to determine the provisional ranking of teams.

== Groups ==
The matchdays were 16–20 September, 23–27 September, 30 September–4 October, 7–11 October, 14–18 October, 21–25 October, 11–15 November, 18–22 November, 25–29 November and 2–6 December 2015. For Groups A and B, additional matchdays include 10–14 February, 17–21 February, 24–28 February and 2–6 March 2016.

=== Group A ===
Pos	Team	Pld	W	D	L	GF	GA	GD	Pts	Qualification
1	(France) Paris Saint-Germain	14	12	0	2	442	389	+53	24	Advanced to quarterfinals
2	(Hungary) MVM Veszprém	14	11	1	2	402	364	+38	23	Advanced to first knockout round
3	(Germany) Flensburg-Handewitt	14	10	0	4	429	380	+49	20	Advanced to first knockout round
4	(Germany) THW Kiel	14	8	1	5	400	388	+12	17	Advanced to first knockout round
5	(Croatia) Zagreb	14	5	1	8	358	367	−9	11	Advanced to first knockout round
6	(Poland) Wisła Płock	14	3	2	9	372	397	−25	8	Advanced to first knockout round
7	(Slovenia) Celje	14	3	1	10	385	398	−13	7	
8	(Turkey) Beşiktaş	14	1	0	13	382	487	−105	2	

Source: EHF
Rules for classification: See Tiebreakers

17 September 2015; 19:00	Zagreb (Croatia)	29–22	(Germany) THW Kiel	Arena Zagreb, Zagreb; Attendance: 8,600; Referees: Mažeika, Gatelis (LTU)
17 September 2015; 19:00	Horvat, Stepančić 6	(13–11)	Dahmke 9	Arena Zagreb, Zagreb; Attendance: 8,600; Referees: Mažeika, Gatelis (LTU)
17 September 2015; 19:00	3× (yellow card) 7× (suspension) 1× (red card)	Report	3× (yellow card) 5× (suspension)	Arena Zagreb, Zagreb; Attendance: 8,600; Referees: Mažeika, Gatelis (LTU)

19 September 2015; 16:00	Wisła Płock (Poland)	27–27	(Hungary) MVM Veszprém	Orlen Arena, Płock; Attendance: 5,467; Referees: Jurinović, Mrvica (CRO)
19 September 2015; 16:00	Rocha 9	(11–13)	Marguč, Nilsson 6	Orlen Arena, Płock; Attendance: 5,467; Referees: Jurinović, Mrvica (CRO)
19 September 2015; 16:00	3× (yellow card) 2× (suspension)	Report	3× (yellow card) 2× (suspension)	Orlen Arena, Płock; Attendance: 5,467; Referees: Jurinović, Mrvica (CRO)

19 September 2015; 17:30	Flensburg-Handewitt (Germany)	39–32	(France) Paris Saint-Germain	Flens-Arena, Flensburg; Attendance: 5,800; Referees: Gjeding, Hansen (DEN)
19 September 2015; 17:30	Eggert 13	(21–16)	Hansen 9	Flens-Arena, Flensburg; Attendance: 5,800; Referees: Gjeding, Hansen (DEN)
19 September 2015; 17:30	2× (yellow card) 9× (suspension)	Report	3× (yellow card) 4× (suspension)	Flens-Arena, Flensburg; Attendance: 5,800; Referees: Gjeding, Hansen (DEN)

19 September 2015; 18:00	Beşiktaş (Turkey)	24–30	(Slovenia) Celje	Recep Topaloğlu Sports Hall, Izmit; Attendance: 2,000; Referees: Geipel, Helbig (GER)
19 September 2015; 18:00	Döne 7	(13–13)	Mlakar 7	Recep Topaloğlu Sports Hall, Izmit; Attendance: 2,000; Referees: Geipel, Helbig (GER)
19 September 2015; 18:00	3× (yellow card) 4× (suspension)	Report	1× (yellow card) 5× (suspension) 1× (red card)	Recep Topaloğlu Sports Hall, Izmit; Attendance: 2,000; Referees: Geipel, Helbig (GER)

26 September 2015; 17:30	MVM Veszprém (Hungary)	28–24	(Germany) Flensburg-Handewitt	Veszprém Aréna, Veszprém; Attendance: 5,019; Referees: Zotin, Volodkov (RUS)
26 September 2015; 17:30	Ilić 9	(15–14)	Eggert, Mahé 4	Veszprém Aréna, Veszprém; Attendance: 5,019; Referees: Zotin, Volodkov (RUS)
26 September 2015; 17:30	3× (yellow card) 1× (suspension)	Report	3× (yellow card) 2× (suspension)	Veszprém Aréna, Veszprém; Attendance: 5,019; Referees: Zotin, Volodkov (RUS)

26 September 2015; 20:00	Celje (Slovenia)	20–21	(Croatia) Zagreb	Zlatorog Arena, Celje; Attendance: 4,300; Referees: Nikolić, Stojković (SRB)
26 September 2015; 20:00	four players 3	(10–9)	Kovačević 4	Zlatorog Arena, Celje; Attendance: 4,300; Referees: Nikolić, Stojković (SRB)
26 September 2015; 20:00	3× (yellow card) 4× (suspension)	Report	3× (yellow card) 8× (suspension)	Zlatorog Arena, Celje; Attendance: 4,300; Referees: Nikolić, Stojković (SRB)

27 September 2015; 17:00	Paris Saint-Germain (France)	29–24	(Poland) Wisła Płock	Stade Pierre de Coubertin, Paris; Attendance: 2,500; Referees: Stoļarovs, Līcis (LAT)
27 September 2015; 17:00	Karabatić 7	(16–13)	Rocha, Zhitnikov 5	Stade Pierre de Coubertin, Paris; Attendance: 2,500; Referees: Stoļarovs, Līcis (LAT)
27 September 2015; 17:00	2× (yellow card) 5× (suspension) 1× (red card)	Report	2× (yellow card) 6× (suspension)	Stade Pierre de Coubertin, Paris; Attendance: 2,500; Referees: Stoļarovs, Līcis (LAT)

27 September 2015; 19:30	THW Kiel (Germany)	32–21	(Turkey) Beşiktaş	Sparkassen-Arena, Kiel; Attendance: 8,200; Referees: Hansen, Pettersen (NOR)
27 September 2015; 19:30	three players 6	(16–12)	Döne 5	Sparkassen-Arena, Kiel; Attendance: 8,200; Referees: Hansen, Pettersen (NOR)
27 September 2015; 19:30	3× (yellow card) 3× (suspension)	Report	3× (yellow card) 6× (suspension)	Sparkassen-Arena, Kiel; Attendance: 8,200; Referees: Hansen, Pettersen (NOR)

3 October 2015; 16:00	Celje (Slovenia)	25–28	(Poland) Wisła Płock	Zlatorog Arena, Celje; Attendance: 3,000; Referees: Brunovsky, Čanda (SVK)
3 October 2015; 16:00	Mlakar 6	(10–17)	Zhitnikov 5	Zlatorog Arena, Celje; Attendance: 3,000; Referees: Brunovsky, Čanda (SVK)
3 October 2015; 16:00	1× (yellow card) 2× (suspension)	Report	3× (yellow card) 4× (suspension)	Zlatorog Arena, Celje; Attendance: 3,000; Referees: Brunovsky, Čanda (SVK)

3 October 2015; 17:30	THW Kiel (Germany)	27–23	(Germany) Flensburg-Handewitt	Sparkassen-Arena, Kiel; Attendance: 10,285; Referees: Horáček, Novotný (CZE)
3 October 2015; 17:30	Cañellas 7	(14–13)	Glandorf 5	Sparkassen-Arena, Kiel; Attendance: 10,285; Referees: Horáček, Novotný (CZE)
3 October 2015; 17:30	3× (yellow card) 3× (suspension) 1× (red card)	Report	3× (yellow card) 4× (suspension)	Sparkassen-Arena, Kiel; Attendance: 10,285; Referees: Horáček, Novotný (CZE)

3 October 2015; 18:00	Beşiktaş (Turkey)	30–40	(France) Paris Saint-Germain	Recep Topaloğlu Sports Hall, Izmit; Attendance: 850; Referees: Pandžić, Mošorinski (SRB)
3 October 2015; 18:00	Döne 7	(17–21)	Hansen 10	Recep Topaloğlu Sports Hall, Izmit; Attendance: 850; Referees: Pandžić, Mošorinski (SRB)
3 October 2015; 18:00	3× (yellow card) 4× (suspension)	Report	3× (yellow card) 3× (suspension)	Recep Topaloğlu Sports Hall, Izmit; Attendance: 850; Referees: Pandžić, Mošorinski (SRB)

3 October 2015; 20:00	Zagreb (Croatia)	20–21	(Hungary) MVM Veszprém	Arena Zagreb, Zagreb; Attendance: 15,200; Referees: Gjeding, Hansen (DEN)
3 October 2015; 20:00	Pavlović 6	(10–9)	Marguč 8	Arena Zagreb, Zagreb; Attendance: 15,200; Referees: Gjeding, Hansen (DEN)
3 October 2015; 20:00	3× (yellow card) 9× (suspension)	Report	2× (yellow card) 5× (suspension) 1× (red card)	Arena Zagreb, Zagreb; Attendance: 15,200; Referees: Gjeding, Hansen (DEN)

10 October 2015; 20:45	Wisła Płock (Poland)	23–37	(Germany) THW Kiel	Orlen Arena, Płock; Attendance: 5,400; Referees: Johansson, Kliko (SWE)
10 October 2015; 20:45	Daszek, Nikčević 4	(8–18)	Cañellas 10	Orlen Arena, Płock; Attendance: 5,400; Referees: Johansson, Kliko (SWE)
10 October 2015; 20:45	3× (yellow card) 4× (suspension)	Report	3× (yellow card) 6× (suspension)	Orlen Arena, Płock; Attendance: 5,400; Referees: Johansson, Kliko (SWE)

11 October 2015; 15:00	MVM Veszprém (Hungary)	33–25	(Turkey) Beşiktaş	Veszprém Aréna, Veszprém; Attendance: 5,000; Referees: Bounouara, Sami (FRA)
11 October 2015; 15:00	Ilić 9	(17–12)	Djukić 6	Veszprém Aréna, Veszprém; Attendance: 5,000; Referees: Bounouara, Sami (FRA)
11 October 2015; 15:00	3× (yellow card) 2× (suspension)	Report	2× (yellow card) 4× (suspension) 2× (red card)	Veszprém Aréna, Veszprém; Attendance: 5,000; Referees: Bounouara, Sami (FRA)

11 October 2015; 17:00	Paris Saint-Germain (France)	34–23	(Croatia) Zagreb	Stade Pierre de Coubertin, Paris; Attendance: 2,800; Referees: Geipel, Helbig (GER)
11 October 2015; 17:00	Hansen 10	(18–8)	Kovačević 5	Stade Pierre de Coubertin, Paris; Attendance: 2,800; Referees: Geipel, Helbig (GER)
11 October 2015; 17:00	3× (yellow card) 2× (suspension)	Report	3× (yellow card) 4× (suspension)	Stade Pierre de Coubertin, Paris; Attendance: 2,800; Referees: Geipel, Helbig (GER)

11 October 2015; 17:00	Flensburg-Handewitt (Germany)	30–20	(Slovenia) Celje	Flens-Arena, Flensburg; Attendance: 4,800; Referees: López, Ramírez (ESP)
11 October 2015; 17:00	Eggert 8	(13–10)	Ivić 4	Flens-Arena, Flensburg; Attendance: 4,800; Referees: López, Ramírez (ESP)
11 October 2015; 17:00	3× (yellow card) 4× (suspension)	Report	2× (yellow card) 5× (suspension)	Flens-Arena, Flensburg; Attendance: 4,800; Referees: López, Ramírez (ESP)

14 October 2015; 19:00	Flensburg-Handewitt (Germany)	33–25	(Turkey) Beşiktaş	Flens-Arena, Flensburg; Attendance: 4,307; Referees: Baranowski, Lemanowicz (POL)
14 October 2015; 19:00	Eggert 10	(16–14)	Döne 7	Flens-Arena, Flensburg; Attendance: 4,307; Referees: Baranowski, Lemanowicz (POL)
14 October 2015; 19:00	3× (yellow card) 3× (suspension)	Report	1× (yellow card) 2× (suspension) 1× (red card)	Flens-Arena, Flensburg; Attendance: 4,307; Referees: Baranowski, Lemanowicz (POL)

17 October 2015; 15:15	MVM Veszprém (Hungary)	29–27	(Germany) THW Kiel	Veszprém Aréna, Veszprém; Attendance: 5,019; Referees: López, Ramírez (ESP)
17 October 2015; 15:15	Gulyás, Ilić 5	(17–15)	Duvnjak 7	Veszprém Aréna, Veszprém; Attendance: 5,019; Referees: López, Ramírez (ESP)
17 October 2015; 15:15	3× (yellow card) 6× (suspension) 1× (red card)	Report	3× (yellow card) 6× (suspension)	Veszprém Aréna, Veszprém; Attendance: 5,019; Referees: López, Ramírez (ESP)

17 October 2015; 20:00	Zagreb (Croatia)	29–25	(Poland) Wisła Płock	Arena Zagreb, Zagreb; Attendance: 10,000; Referees: Horáček, Novotný (CZE)
17 October 2015; 20:00	Stepančić 8	(13–13)	Zelenović 8	Arena Zagreb, Zagreb; Attendance: 10,000; Referees: Horáček, Novotný (CZE)
17 October 2015; 20:00	3× (yellow card) 7× (suspension)	Report	2× (yellow card) 3× (suspension) 1× (red card)	Arena Zagreb, Zagreb; Attendance: 10,000; Referees: Horáček, Novotný (CZE)

18 October 2015; 17:00	Celje (Slovenia)	30–32	(France) Paris Saint-Germain	Zlatorog Arena, Celje; Attendance: 4,650; Referees: Santos, Fonseca (POR)
18 October 2015; 17:00	Ivić 8	(15–16)	Karabatić 9	Zlatorog Arena, Celje; Attendance: 4,650; Referees: Santos, Fonseca (POR)
18 October 2015; 17:00	3× (yellow card) 9× (suspension) 1× (red card)	Report	3× (yellow card) 3× (suspension)	Zlatorog Arena, Celje; Attendance: 4,650; Referees: Santos, Fonseca (POR)

21 October 2015; 18:45	THW Kiel (Germany)	35–32	(Slovenia) Celje	Sparkassen-Arena, Kiel; Attendance: 8,537; Referees: Nikolov, Nachevski (MKD)
21 October 2015; 18:45	Duvnjak 8	(16–14)	Janc 7	Sparkassen-Arena, Kiel; Attendance: 8,537; Referees: Nikolov, Nachevski (MKD)
21 October 2015; 18:45	3× (yellow card)	Report	3× (yellow card) 5× (suspension)	Sparkassen-Arena, Kiel; Attendance: 8,537; Referees: Nikolov, Nachevski (MKD)

24 October 2015; 18:00	Beşiktaş (Turkey)	32–30	(Croatia) Zagreb	Süleyman Seba Sport Complex, Istanbul; Attendance: 1,026; Referees: Dentz, Reibel (FRA)
24 October 2015; 18:00	Döne 10	(17–13)	Stepančić 7	Süleyman Seba Sport Complex, Istanbul; Attendance: 1,026; Referees: Dentz, Reibel (FRA)
24 October 2015; 18:00	3× (yellow card) 2× (suspension)	Report	3× (yellow card) 3× (suspension)	Süleyman Seba Sport Complex, Istanbul; Attendance: 1,026; Referees: Dentz, Reibel (FRA)

25 October 2015; 17:00	Paris Saint-Germain (France)	29–27	(Hungary) MVM Veszprém	Stade Pierre de Coubertin, Paris; Attendance: 4,800; Referees: Elíasson, Pálsson (ISL)
25 October 2015; 17:00	Hansen 11	(16–12)	Pálmarsson 7	Stade Pierre de Coubertin, Paris; Attendance: 4,800; Referees: Elíasson, Pálsson (ISL)
25 October 2015; 17:00	3× (yellow card) 3× (suspension) 1× (red card)	Report	3× (yellow card) 6× (suspension)	Stade Pierre de Coubertin, Paris; Attendance: 4,800; Referees: Elíasson, Pálsson (ISL)

25 October 2015; 18:00	Wisła Płock (Poland)	30–34	(Germany) Flensburg-Handewitt	Orlen Arena, Płock; Attendance: 4,500; Referees: Pichon, Reveret (FRA)
25 October 2015; 18:00	Tarabochia 5	(13–17)	Schmidt 9	Orlen Arena, Płock; Attendance: 4,500; Referees: Pichon, Reveret (FRA)
25 October 2015; 18:00	3× (yellow card) 1× (suspension)	Report	3× (yellow card) 5× (suspension)	Orlen Arena, Płock; Attendance: 4,500; Referees: Pichon, Reveret (FRA)

11 November 2015; 19:00	Flensburg-Handewitt (Germany)	28–27	(Croatia) Zagreb	Flens-Arena, Flensburg; Attendance: 4,587; Referees: Dinu, Din (ROU)
11 November 2015; 19:00	Mahe 8	(12–13)	Pavlović 9	Flens-Arena, Flensburg; Attendance: 4,587; Referees: Dinu, Din (ROU)
11 November 2015; 19:00	3× (yellow card) 3× (suspension)	Report	3× (yellow card) 5× (suspension)	Flens-Arena, Flensburg; Attendance: 4,587; Referees: Dinu, Din (ROU)

12 November 2015; 18:45	THW Kiel (Germany)	26–30	(France) Paris Saint-Germain	Sparkassen-Arena, Kiel; Attendance: 10,040; Referees: Krstič, Ljubič (SLO)
12 November 2015; 18:45	Vujin 5	(10–16)	Onufryienko 7	Sparkassen-Arena, Kiel; Attendance: 10,040; Referees: Krstič, Ljubič (SLO)
12 November 2015; 18:45	3× (yellow card) 3× (suspension)	Report	3× (yellow card) 5× (suspension)	Sparkassen-Arena, Kiel; Attendance: 10,040; Referees: Krstič, Ljubič (SLO)

14 November 2015; 16:00	Wisła Płock (Poland)	32–26	(Turkey) Beşiktaş	Orlen Arena, Płock; Attendance: 4,150; Referees: Gjeding, Hansen (DEN)
14 November 2015; 16:00	Piechowski 5	(15–12)	Djukić 9	Orlen Arena, Płock; Attendance: 4,150; Referees: Gjeding, Hansen (DEN)
14 November 2015; 16:00	2× (yellow card) 5× (suspension)	Report	2× (yellow card) 1× (suspension)	Orlen Arena, Płock; Attendance: 4,150; Referees: Gjeding, Hansen (DEN)

15 November 2015; 15:00	Celje (Slovenia)	27–30	(Hungary) MVM Veszprém	Zlatorog Arena, Celje; Attendance: 4,500; Referees: Stark, Ştefan (ROU)
15 November 2015; 15:00	Žvižej 6	(11–17)	Sulić 8	Zlatorog Arena, Celje; Attendance: 4,500; Referees: Stark, Ştefan (ROU)
15 November 2015; 15:00	3× (yellow card) 5× (suspension)	Report	3× (yellow card) 4× (suspension)	Zlatorog Arena, Celje; Attendance: 4,500; Referees: Stark, Ştefan (ROU)

21 November 2015; 16:00	MVM Veszprém (Hungary)	34–28	(Slovenia) Celje	Veszprém Aréna, Veszprém; Attendance: 5,019; Referees: Kurtagic, Wetterwik (SWE)
21 November 2015; 16:00	Sulić 8	(17–15)	Ivić, Zarabec 6	Veszprém Aréna, Veszprém; Attendance: 5,019; Referees: Kurtagic, Wetterwik (SWE)
21 November 2015; 16:00	3× (yellow card) 2× (suspension)	Report	3× (yellow card) 3× (suspension)	Veszprém Aréna, Veszprém; Attendance: 5,019; Referees: Kurtagic, Wetterwik (SWE)

21 November 2015; 17:00	Beşiktaş (Turkey)	29–38	(Poland) Wisła Płock	Sinan Erdem Dome, Istanbul; Attendance: 250; Referees: Pichon, Reveret (FRA)
21 November 2015; 17:00	Döne 9	(15–19)	Zhitnikov 7	Sinan Erdem Dome, Istanbul; Attendance: 250; Referees: Pichon, Reveret (FRA)
21 November 2015; 17:00	3× (yellow card) 5× (suspension)	Report	2× (yellow card) 5× (suspension)	Sinan Erdem Dome, Istanbul; Attendance: 250; Referees: Pichon, Reveret (FRA)

21 November 2015; 19:00	Zagreb (Croatia)	23–30	(Germany) Flensburg-Handewitt	Arena Zagreb, Zagreb; Attendance: 9,000; Referees: Stoļarovs, Līcis (LAT)
21 November 2015; 19:00	Sebetić 8	(10–15)	Svan Hansen 7	Arena Zagreb, Zagreb; Attendance: 9,000; Referees: Stoļarovs, Līcis (LAT)
21 November 2015; 19:00	2× (yellow card) 2× (suspension)	Report	3× (yellow card) 4× (suspension) 1× (red card)	Arena Zagreb, Zagreb; Attendance: 9,000; Referees: Stoļarovs, Līcis (LAT)

21 November 2015; 20:45	Paris Saint-Germain (France)	37–30	(Germany) THW Kiel	Stade Pierre de Coubertin, Paris; Attendance: 3,400; Referees: Nikolov, Nachevski (MKD)
21 November 2015; 20:45	Karabatić 8	(18–12)	Dissinger, Vujin 6	Stade Pierre de Coubertin, Paris; Attendance: 3,400; Referees: Nikolov, Nachevski (MKD)
21 November 2015; 20:45	3× (yellow card) 6× (suspension)	Report	3× (yellow card) 4× (suspension)	Stade Pierre de Coubertin, Paris; Attendance: 3,400; Referees: Nikolov, Nachevski (MKD)

25 November 2015; 18:30	Flensburg-Handewitt (Germany)	27–25	(Poland) Wisła Płock	Flens-Arena, Flensburg; Attendance: 4,367; Referees: Togstad, Kristiansen (NOR)
25 November 2015; 18:30	Lauge Schmidt 11	(13–11)	Zhitnikov 6	Flens-Arena, Flensburg; Attendance: 4,367; Referees: Togstad, Kristiansen (NOR)
25 November 2015; 18:30	3× (yellow card)	Report	3× (yellow card) 3× (suspension)	Flens-Arena, Flensburg; Attendance: 4,367; Referees: Togstad, Kristiansen (NOR)

26 November 2015; 19:00	Zagreb (Croatia)	32–26	(Turkey) Beşiktaş	Arena Zagreb, Zagreb; Attendance: 5,000; Referees: Kaveshnikov, Plotnikov (RUS)
26 November 2015; 19:00	Vujić 9	(14–11)	Djukić 7	Arena Zagreb, Zagreb; Attendance: 5,000; Referees: Kaveshnikov, Plotnikov (RUS)
26 November 2015; 19:00	3× (yellow card) 4× (suspension)	Report	3× (yellow card) 4× (suspension)	Arena Zagreb, Zagreb; Attendance: 5,000; Referees: Kaveshnikov, Plotnikov (RUS)

28 November 2015; 15:00	MVM Veszprém (Hungary)	28–20	(France) Paris Saint-Germain	Veszprém Aréna, Veszprém; Attendance: 5,019; Referees: Gousko, Repkin (BLR)
28 November 2015; 15:00	Ilić 10	(16–14)	Narcisse 4	Veszprém Aréna, Veszprém; Attendance: 5,019; Referees: Gousko, Repkin (BLR)
28 November 2015; 15:00	3× (yellow card) 3× (suspension)	Report	3× (yellow card) 3× (suspension)	Veszprém Aréna, Veszprém; Attendance: 5,019; Referees: Gousko, Repkin (BLR)

28 November 2015; 17:30	Celje (Slovenia)	23–23	(Germany) THW Kiel	Zlatorog Arena, Celje; Attendance: 3,700; Referees: Zotin, Volodkov (RUS)
28 November 2015; 17:30	Ivić, Janc 4	(14–14)	Dahmke 5	Zlatorog Arena, Celje; Attendance: 3,700; Referees: Zotin, Volodkov (RUS)
28 November 2015; 17:30	3× (yellow card) 5× (suspension) 1× (red card)	Report	3× (yellow card) 6× (suspension) 1× (red card)	Zlatorog Arena, Celje; Attendance: 3,700; Referees: Zotin, Volodkov (RUS)

5 December 2015; 20:30	Wisła Płock (Poland)	23–23	(Croatia) Zagreb	Orlen Arena, Płock; Attendance: 5,300; Referees: Dobrovits, Tájok (HUN)
5 December 2015; 20:30	De Toledo, Rocha 6	(11–12)	Vujić 6	Orlen Arena, Płock; Attendance: 5,300; Referees: Dobrovits, Tájok (HUN)
5 December 2015; 20:30	2× (yellow card) 4× (suspension)	Report	2× (yellow card) 7× (suspension)	Orlen Arena, Płock; Attendance: 5,300; Referees: Dobrovits, Tájok (HUN)

6 December 2015; 14:15	THW Kiel (Germany)	25–24	(Hungary) MVM Veszprém	Sparkassen-Arena, Kiel; Attendance: 9,870; Referees: Nikolić, Stojković (SRB)
6 December 2015; 14:15	Vujin 8	(11–12)	Nagy 6	Sparkassen-Arena, Kiel; Attendance: 9,870; Referees: Nikolić, Stojković (SRB)
6 December 2015; 14:15	3× (yellow card) 2× (suspension)	Report	3× (yellow card) 4× (suspension)	Sparkassen-Arena, Kiel; Attendance: 9,870; Referees: Nikolić, Stojković (SRB)

6 December 2015; 17:00	Paris Saint-Germain (France)	32–27	(Slovenia) Celje	Stade Pierre de Coubertin, Paris; Attendance: 2,600; Referees: Baumgart, Wild (GER)
6 December 2015; 17:00	Hansen 9	(17–12)	Blagotinšek, Mlakar 5	Stade Pierre de Coubertin, Paris; Attendance: 2,600; Referees: Baumgart, Wild (GER)
6 December 2015; 17:00	3× (yellow card) 1× (suspension)	Report	3× (yellow card) 3× (suspension)	Stade Pierre de Coubertin, Paris; Attendance: 2,600; Referees: Baumgart, Wild (GER)

6 December 2015; 20:30	Beşiktaş (Turkey)	26–34	(Germany) Flensburg-Handewitt	Sinan Erdem Dome, Istanbul; Attendance: 350; Referees: Mažeika, Gatelis (LTU)
6 December 2015; 20:30	Özbahar 8	(16–17)	Glandorf 10	Sinan Erdem Dome, Istanbul; Attendance: 350; Referees: Mažeika, Gatelis (LTU)
6 December 2015; 20:30	3× (yellow card) 2× (suspension)	Report	3× (yellow card) 5× (suspension)	Sinan Erdem Dome, Istanbul; Attendance: 350; Referees: Mažeika, Gatelis (LTU)

10 February 2016; 18:45	Zagreb (Croatia)	23–25	(France) Paris Saint-Germain	Arena Zagreb, Zagreb; Attendance: 15,200; Referees: Togstad, Kristiansen (NOR)
10 February 2016; 18:45	Mandalinić 5	(10–15)	Hansen 7	Arena Zagreb, Zagreb; Attendance: 15,200; Referees: Togstad, Kristiansen (NOR)
10 February 2016; 18:45	3× (yellow card) 3× (suspension)	Report	3× (yellow card) 1× (suspension)	Arena Zagreb, Zagreb; Attendance: 15,200; Referees: Togstad, Kristiansen (NOR)

13 February 2016; 16:00	Wisła Płock (Poland)	26–31	(Slovenia) Celje	Orlen Arena, Płock; Attendance: 4,500; Referees: Geipel, Helbig (GER)
13 February 2016; 16:00	Rocha 7	(12–17)	Janc 8	Orlen Arena, Płock; Attendance: 4,500; Referees: Geipel, Helbig (GER)
13 February 2016; 16:00	2× (yellow card) 3× (suspension)	Report	3× (yellow card) 7× (suspension) 1× (red card)	Orlen Arena, Płock; Attendance: 4,500; Referees: Geipel, Helbig (GER)

13 February 2016; 18:00	Beşiktaş (Turkey)	34–38	(Hungary) MVM Veszprém	Süleyman Seba Sport Complex, Istanbul; Attendance: 350; Referees: Pandžić, Šatordžija (BIH)
13 February 2016; 18:00	Djukić 8	(15–21)	Nilsson, Slišković 6	Süleyman Seba Sport Complex, Istanbul; Attendance: 350; Referees: Pandžić, Šatordžija (BIH)
13 February 2016; 18:00	3× (yellow card) 4× (suspension)	Report	3× (yellow card) 3× (suspension)	Süleyman Seba Sport Complex, Istanbul; Attendance: 350; Referees: Pandžić, Šatordžija (BIH)

14 February 2016; 19:30	Flensburg-Handewitt (Germany)	37–27	(Germany) THW Kiel	Flens-Arena, Flensburg; Attendance: 6,000; Referees: López, Ramírez (ESP)
14 February 2016; 19:30	Schmidt 9	(17–14)	Duvnjak 8	Flens-Arena, Flensburg; Attendance: 6,000; Referees: López, Ramírez (ESP)
14 February 2016; 19:30	3× (yellow card) 4× (suspension)	Report	3× (yellow card) 5× (suspension)	Flens-Arena, Flensburg; Attendance: 6,000; Referees: López, Ramírez (ESP)

17 February 2016; 18:30	THW Kiel (Germany)	26–24	(Poland) Wisła Płock	Sparkassen-Arena, Kiel; Attendance: 9,800; Referees: Gousko, Repkin (BLR)
17 February 2016; 18:30	Duvnjak 10	(14–14)	Rocha 7	Sparkassen-Arena, Kiel; Attendance: 9,800; Referees: Gousko, Repkin (BLR)
17 February 2016; 18:30	3× (yellow card) 3× (suspension)	Report	3× (yellow card) 5× (suspension)	Sparkassen-Arena, Kiel; Attendance: 9,800; Referees: Gousko, Repkin (BLR)

20 February 2016; 17:00	Paris Saint-Germain (France)	40–28	(Turkey) Beşiktaş	Stade Pierre de Coubertin, Paris; Attendance: 2,800; Referees: Kiyashko, Kiselev (RUS)
20 February 2016; 17:00	Hansen 10	(16—11)	Djukić 11	Stade Pierre de Coubertin, Paris; Attendance: 2,800; Referees: Kiyashko, Kiselev (RUS)
20 February 2016; 17:00	3× (yellow card) 5× (suspension)	Report	2× (yellow card) 3× (suspension)	Stade Pierre de Coubertin, Paris; Attendance: 2,800; Referees: Kiyashko, Kiselev (RUS)

20 February 2016; 19:30	Celje (Slovenia)	26–30	(Germany) Flensburg-Handewitt	Zlatorog Arena, Celje; Attendance: 4,247; Referees: Hansen, Pettersen (NOR)
20 February 2016; 19:30	Janc 7	(15–12)	Svan Hansen 8	Zlatorog Arena, Celje; Attendance: 4,247; Referees: Hansen, Pettersen (NOR)
20 February 2016; 19:30	3× (yellow card) 6× (suspension)	Report	3× (yellow card) 4× (suspension)	Zlatorog Arena, Celje; Attendance: 4,247; Referees: Hansen, Pettersen (NOR)

21 February 2016; 15:00	MVM Veszprém (Hungary)	27–25	(Croatia) Zagreb	Veszprém Aréna, Veszprém; Attendance: 5,019; Referees: Johansson, Kliko (SWE)
21 February 2016; 15:00	Slišković 7	(16–12)	four players 4	Veszprém Aréna, Veszprém; Attendance: 5,019; Referees: Johansson, Kliko (SWE)
21 February 2016; 15:00	3× (yellow card) 4× (suspension)	Report	3× (yellow card) 6× (suspension) 1× (red card)	Veszprém Aréna, Veszprém; Attendance: 5,019; Referees: Johansson, Kliko (SWE)

24 February 2016; 19:30	Beşiktaş (Turkey)	27–32	(Germany) THW Kiel	Süleyman Seba Sport Complex, Istanbul; Attendance: 320; Referees: Madsen, Mortensen (DEN)
24 February 2016; 19:30	Djukić 9	(14–17)	Vujin 6	Süleyman Seba Sport Complex, Istanbul; Attendance: 320; Referees: Madsen, Mortensen (DEN)
24 February 2016; 19:30	3× (yellow card) 3× (suspension)	Report	3× (yellow card) 5× (suspension)	Süleyman Seba Sport Complex, Istanbul; Attendance: 320; Referees: Madsen, Mortensen (DEN)

27 February 2016; 17:30	Flensburg-Handewitt (Germany)	28–29	(Hungary) MVM Veszprém	Flens-Arena, Flensburg; Attendance: 6,300; Referees: Gubica, Milošević (CRO)
27 February 2016; 17:30	Schmidt 8	(12–10)	Nagy 9	Flens-Arena, Flensburg; Attendance: 6,300; Referees: Gubica, Milošević (CRO)
27 February 2016; 17:30	3× (yellow card) 2× (suspension)	Report	3× (yellow card) 2× (suspension)	Flens-Arena, Flensburg; Attendance: 6,300; Referees: Gubica, Milošević (CRO)

27 February 2016; 17:30	Wisła Płock (Poland)	22–27	(France) Paris Saint-Germain	Orlen Arena, Płock; Attendance: 5,400; Referees: Stark, Ştefan (ROU)
27 February 2016; 17:30	Toledo, Racoțea 5	(12–16)	Hansen 8	Orlen Arena, Płock; Attendance: 5,400; Referees: Stark, Ştefan (ROU)
27 February 2016; 17:30	3× (yellow card) 2× (suspension)	Report	2× (yellow card) 2× (suspension)	Orlen Arena, Płock; Attendance: 5,400; Referees: Stark, Ştefan (ROU)

27 February 2016; 20:00	Zagreb (Croatia)	24–23	(Slovenia) Celje	Arena Zagreb, Zagreb; Attendance: 10,000; Referees: Pavićević, Ražnatović (MNE)
27 February 2016; 20:00	Mandalinić 10	(8–9)	Mlakar 7	Arena Zagreb, Zagreb; Attendance: 10,000; Referees: Pavićević, Ražnatović (MNE)
27 February 2016; 20:00	3× (yellow card) 4× (suspension)	Report	3× (yellow card) 5× (suspension)	Arena Zagreb, Zagreb; Attendance: 10,000; Referees: Pavićević, Ražnatović (MNE)

3 March 2016; 19:30	THW Kiel (Germany)	31–29	(Croatia) Zagreb	Sparkassen-Arena, Kiel; Attendance: 10,285; Referees: Baďura, Ondogrecula (SVK)
3 March 2016; 19:30	Duvnjak 10	(14–17)	Sebetić 8	Sparkassen-Arena, Kiel; Attendance: 10,285; Referees: Baďura, Ondogrecula (SVK)
3 March 2016; 19:30	3× (yellow card) 5× (suspension)	Report	3× (yellow card) 3× (suspension) 1× (red card)	Sparkassen-Arena, Kiel; Attendance: 10,285; Referees: Baďura, Ondogrecula (SVK)

5 March 2016; 17:00	MVM Veszprém (Hungary)	27–25	(Poland) Wisła Płock	Veszprém Aréna, Veszprém; Attendance: 5,000; Referees: Pandžić, Mošorinski (SRB)
5 March 2016; 17:00	Ilić 7	(16–13)	Daszek 7	Veszprém Aréna, Veszprém; Attendance: 5,000; Referees: Pandžić, Mošorinski (SRB)
5 March 2016; 17:00	3× (yellow card) 2× (suspension)	Report	3× (yellow card) 5× (suspension)	Veszprém Aréna, Veszprém; Attendance: 5,000; Referees: Pandžić, Mošorinski (SRB)

5 March 2016; 18:00	Celje (Slovenia)	43–29	(Turkey) Beşiktaş	Zlatorog Arena, Celje; Attendance: 2,800; Referees: Krkacev, Kolevski (MKD)
5 March 2016; 18:00	Marguč 8	(21–14)	Pribak 10	Zlatorog Arena, Celje; Attendance: 2,800; Referees: Krkacev, Kolevski (MKD)
5 March 2016; 18:00	3× (yellow card) 6× (suspension)	Report	3× (yellow card) 7× (suspension)	Zlatorog Arena, Celje; Attendance: 2,800; Referees: Krkacev, Kolevski (MKD)

6 March 2016; 17:00	Paris Saint-Germain (France)	35–32	(Germany) Flensburg-Handewitt	Stade Pierre de Coubertin, Paris; Attendance: 4,000; Referees: Nikolić, Stojković (SRB)
6 March 2016; 17:00	Honrubia 8	(16–16)	Eggert, Mahé 5	Stade Pierre de Coubertin, Paris; Attendance: 4,000; Referees: Nikolić, Stojković (SRB)
6 March 2016; 17:00	3× (yellow card) 2× (suspension)	Report	2× (yellow card) 6× (suspension)	Stade Pierre de Coubertin, Paris; Attendance: 4,000; Referees: Nikolić, Stojković (SRB)

=== Group B ===
Pos	Team	Pld	W	D	L	GF	GA	GD	Pts	Qualification
1	(Spain) Barcelona Lassa	14	11	1	2	423	372	+51	23	Advanced to quarter-finals
2	(Poland) Vive Tauron Kielce	14	9	3	2	425	399	+26	21	Advanced to first knockout round
3	(North Macedonia) Vardar	14	9	0	5	416	373	+43	18	Advanced to first knockout round
4	(Germany) Rhein-Neckar Löwen	14	8	1	5	369	353	+16	17	Advanced to first knockout round
5	(Hungary) MOL-Pick Szeged	14	7	1	6	404	390	+14	15	Advanced to first knockout round
6	(France) Montpellier	14	3	1	10	372	413	−41	7 (Note: Montpellier 60–55 Kristianstad)	Advanced to first knockout round
7	(Sweden) IFK Kristianstad	14	3	1	10	409	437	−28	7	
8	(Denmark) KIF Kolding København	14	2	0	12	348	429	−81	4	

Source: EHF
Rules for classification: See Tiebreakers
Notes:

16 September 2015; 19:00	IFK Kristianstad (Sweden)	33–26	(Denmark) KIF Kolding København	Kristianstad Arena, Kristianstad; Attendance: 4,168; Referees: Elíasson, Pálsson (ISL)
16 September 2015; 19:00	Bjørnsen 9	(16–10)	Igropulo 6	Kristianstad Arena, Kristianstad; Attendance: 4,168; Referees: Elíasson, Pálsson (ISL)
16 September 2015; 19:00	3× (yellow card) 5× (suspension)	Report	3× (yellow card) 2× (suspension)	Kristianstad Arena, Kristianstad; Attendance: 4,168; Referees: Elíasson, Pálsson (ISL)

20 September 2015; 16:30	MOL-Pick Szeged (Hungary)	31–30	(Poland) Vive Tauron Kielce	Városi Sportcsarnok, Szeged; Attendance: 3,000; Referees: Raluy, Sabroso (ESP)
20 September 2015; 16:30	Bombač 11	(17–14)	Aguinagalde 6	Városi Sportcsarnok, Szeged; Attendance: 3,000; Referees: Raluy, Sabroso (ESP)
20 September 2015; 16:30	3× (yellow card) 8× (suspension)	Report	3× (yellow card) 1× (suspension)	Városi Sportcsarnok, Szeged; Attendance: 3,000; Referees: Raluy, Sabroso (ESP)

20 September 2015; 17:00	Montpellier (France)	25–30	(North Macedonia) Vardar	Park&Suites Arena, Montpellier; Attendance: 2,700; Referees: Togstad, Kristiansen (NOR)
20 September 2015; 17:00	Gajić 8	(12–9)	Dibirov, Maqueda 6	Park&Suites Arena, Montpellier; Attendance: 2,700; Referees: Togstad, Kristiansen (NOR)
20 September 2015; 17:00	3× (yellow card) 4× (suspension)	Report	3× (yellow card) 4× (suspension)	Park&Suites Arena, Montpellier; Attendance: 2,700; Referees: Togstad, Kristiansen (NOR)

20 September 2015; 19:30	Rhein-Neckar Löwen (Germany)	22–21	(Spain) Barcelona Lassa	SAP Arena, Mannheim; Attendance: 7,361; Referees: Nikolov, Nachevski (MKD)
20 September 2015; 19:30	Gensheimer 6	(10–9)	Lazarov 6	SAP Arena, Mannheim; Attendance: 7,361; Referees: Nikolov, Nachevski (MKD)
20 September 2015; 19:30	3× (yellow card) 1× (suspension)	Report	3× (yellow card) 3× (suspension)	SAP Arena, Mannheim; Attendance: 7,361; Referees: Nikolov, Nachevski (MKD)

26 September 2015; 16:15	Vive Tauron Kielce (Poland)	30–23	(France) Montpellier	Hala Legionów, Kielce; Attendance: 4,200; Referees: Gousko, Repkin (BLR)
26 September 2015; 16:15	Bielecki 7	(12–11)	Dolenec 6	Hala Legionów, Kielce; Attendance: 4,200; Referees: Gousko, Repkin (BLR)
26 September 2015; 16:15	3× (yellow card) 1× (suspension)	Report	3× (yellow card) 2× (suspension)	Hala Legionów, Kielce; Attendance: 4,200; Referees: Gousko, Repkin (BLR)

26 September 2015; 18:45	Barcelona Lassa (Spain)	34–32	(Sweden) IFK Kristianstad	Palau Blaugrana, Barcelona; Attendance: 3,109; Referees: Lah, Sok (SLO)
26 September 2015; 18:45	Jallouz 6	(17–16)	Bjørnsen 11	Palau Blaugrana, Barcelona; Attendance: 3,109; Referees: Lah, Sok (SLO)
26 September 2015; 18:45	3× (yellow card) 1× (suspension)	Report	3× (yellow card) 3× (suspension)	Palau Blaugrana, Barcelona; Attendance: 3,109; Referees: Lah, Sok (SLO)

27 September 2015; 16:50	KIF Kolding København (Denmark)	18–30	(Germany) Rhein-Neckar Löwen	Kolding-Hallen, Kolding; Attendance: 2,413; Referees: Pichon, Reveret (FRA)
27 September 2015; 16:50	Andersen 4	(8–12)	Reinkind, Schmid 6	Kolding-Hallen, Kolding; Attendance: 2,413; Referees: Pichon, Reveret (FRA)
27 September 2015; 16:50	3× (yellow card) 3× (suspension)	Report	3× (yellow card) 5× (suspension)	Kolding-Hallen, Kolding; Attendance: 2,413; Referees: Pichon, Reveret (FRA)

27 September 2015; 17:30	Vardar (North Macedonia)	27–23	(Hungary) MOL-Pick Szeged	Jane Sandanski Arena, Skopje; Attendance: 5,000; Referees: Baďura, Ondogrecula (SVK)
27 September 2015; 17:30	Karačić 5	(11–11)	Källman 6	Jane Sandanski Arena, Skopje; Attendance: 5,000; Referees: Baďura, Ondogrecula (SVK)
27 September 2015; 17:30	3× (yellow card) 2× (suspension)	Report	2× (yellow card) 3× (suspension)	Jane Sandanski Arena, Skopje; Attendance: 5,000; Referees: Baďura, Ondogrecula (SVK)

30 September 2015; 18:30	Rhein-Neckar Löwen (Germany)	32–32	(Poland) Vive Tauron Kielce	SAP Arena, Mannheim; Attendance: 3,500; Referees: Gubica, Milošević (CRO)
30 September 2015; 18:30	Ekdahl du Rietz, Reinkind 6	(19–15)	Jurecki 9	SAP Arena, Mannheim; Attendance: 3,500; Referees: Gubica, Milošević (CRO)
30 September 2015; 18:30	3× (yellow card) 4× (suspension)	Report	3× (yellow card) 2× (suspension)	SAP Arena, Mannheim; Attendance: 3,500; Referees: Gubica, Milošević (CRO)

4 October 2015; 16:30	IFK Kristianstad (Sweden)	25–30	(North Macedonia) Vardar	Kristianstad Arena, Kristianstad; Attendance: 4,946; Referees: Erdoğan, Özdeniz (TUR)
4 October 2015; 16:30	Tollbring 7	(13–15)	Dibirov, Toskić 7	Kristianstad Arena, Kristianstad; Attendance: 4,946; Referees: Erdoğan, Özdeniz (TUR)
4 October 2015; 16:30	3× (yellow card) 3× (suspension)	Report	3× (yellow card) 4× (suspension)	Kristianstad Arena, Kristianstad; Attendance: 4,946; Referees: Erdoğan, Özdeniz (TUR)

4 October 2015; 17:00	Montpellier (France)	30–25	(Denmark) KIF Kolding København	Park&Suites Arena, Montpellier; Attendance: 2,900; Referees: Krstič, Ljubič (SLO)
4 October 2015; 17:00	Mačkovšek 9	(14–14)	L. Andersson, Andersen 9	Park&Suites Arena, Montpellier; Attendance: 2,900; Referees: Krstič, Ljubič (SLO)
4 October 2015; 17:00	2× (yellow card) 2× (suspension)	Report	3× (yellow card) 5× (suspension)	Park&Suites Arena, Montpellier; Attendance: 2,900; Referees: Krstič, Ljubič (SLO)

4 October 2015; 17:00	MOL-Pick Szeged (Hungary)	28−30	(Spain) Barcelona Lassa	Városi Sportcsarnok, Szeged; Attendance: 3,200; Referees: Caçador, Nicolau (POR)
4 October 2015; 17:00	Balogh, Källman 7	(12–13)	four players 5	Városi Sportcsarnok, Szeged; Attendance: 3,200; Referees: Caçador, Nicolau (POR)
4 October 2015; 17:00	3× (yellow card) 2× (suspension)	Report	3× (yellow card) 4× (suspension)	Városi Sportcsarnok, Szeged; Attendance: 3,200; Referees: Caçador, Nicolau (POR)

10 October 2015; 16:00	Vive Tauron Kielce (Poland)	35–27	(Sweden) IFK Kristianstad	Hala Legionów, Kielce; Attendance: 4,200; Referees: Horváth, Marton (HUN)
10 October 2015; 16:00	Aguinagalde 6	(20–12)	Bjørnsen 6	Hala Legionów, Kielce; Attendance: 4,200; Referees: Horváth, Marton (HUN)
10 October 2015; 16:00	3× (yellow card) 3× (suspension)	Report	3× (yellow card) 5× (suspension)	Hala Legionów, Kielce; Attendance: 4,200; Referees: Horváth, Marton (HUN)

10 October 2015; 17:30	Vardar (North Macedonia)	25–19	(Germany) Rhein-Neckar Löwen	Jane Sandanski Arena, Skopje; Attendance: 5,500; Referees: Dinu, Din (ROU)
10 October 2015; 17:30	Dujshebaev 7	(11–10)	Larsen 7	Jane Sandanski Arena, Skopje; Attendance: 5,500; Referees: Dinu, Din (ROU)
10 October 2015; 17:30	3× (yellow card) 1× (suspension)	Report	3× (yellow card) 2× (suspension) 1× (red card)	Jane Sandanski Arena, Skopje; Attendance: 5,500; Referees: Dinu, Din (ROU)

10 October 2015; 19:00	Barcelona Lassa (Spain)	37–27	(France) Montpellier	Palau Blaugrana, Barcelona; Attendance: 3,014; Referees: Stark, Ştefan (ROU)
10 October 2015; 19:00	Lazarov 12	(19–12)	Gajić 8	Palau Blaugrana, Barcelona; Attendance: 3,014; Referees: Stark, Ştefan (ROU)
10 October 2015; 19:00	2× (yellow card) 5× (suspension)	Report	3× (yellow card) 4× (suspension)	Palau Blaugrana, Barcelona; Attendance: 3,014; Referees: Stark, Ştefan (ROU)

11 October 2015; 16:50	KIF Kolding København (Denmark)	22–27	(Hungary) MOL-Pick Szeged	Brøndby Hall, Brøndby; Attendance: 4,042; Referees: Gousko, Repkin (BLR)
11 October 2015; 16:50	Spellerberg 8	(9–16)	Källman 5	Brøndby Hall, Brøndby; Attendance: 4,042; Referees: Gousko, Repkin (BLR)
11 October 2015; 16:50	3× (yellow card) 2× (suspension)	Report	3× (yellow card) 2× (suspension)	Brøndby Hall, Brøndby; Attendance: 4,042; Referees: Gousko, Repkin (BLR)

17 October 2015; 17:00	Montpellier (France)	30–26	(Sweden) IFK Kristianstad	Park&Suites Arena, Montpellier; Attendance: 2,700; Referees: Pavićević, Ražnatović (MNE)
17 October 2015; 17:00	Dolenec 8	(13–14)	Bjørnsen 8	Park&Suites Arena, Montpellier; Attendance: 2,700; Referees: Pavićević, Ražnatović (MNE)
17 October 2015; 17:00	3× (yellow card) 4× (suspension)	Report	3× (yellow card) 7× (suspension)	Park&Suites Arena, Montpellier; Attendance: 2,700; Referees: Pavićević, Ražnatović (MNE)

17 October 2015; 17:30	Rhein-Neckar Löwen (Germany)	30−25	(Hungary) MOL-Pick Szeged	SAP Arena, Mannheim; Attendance: 4,068; Referees: Nikolić, Stojković (SRB)
17 October 2015; 17:30	Schmid 7	(13–13)	Balogh, Bombač 5	SAP Arena, Mannheim; Attendance: 4,068; Referees: Nikolić, Stojković (SRB)
17 October 2015; 17:30	4× (yellow card) 3× (suspension)	Report	3× (yellow card) 4× (suspension)	SAP Arena, Mannheim; Attendance: 4,068; Referees: Nikolić, Stojković (SRB)

17 October 2015; 18:00	Vive Tauron Kielce (Poland)	30−30	(Spain) Barcelona Lassa	Hala Legionów, Kielce; Attendance: 4,200; Referees: Krstič, Ljubič (SLO)
17 October 2015; 18:00	Jurecki 7	(14−17)	Lazarov 7	Hala Legionów, Kielce; Attendance: 4,200; Referees: Krstič, Ljubič (SLO)
17 October 2015; 18:00	2× (yellow card) 3× (suspension) 1× (red card)	Report	3× (yellow card) 3× (suspension)	Hala Legionów, Kielce; Attendance: 4,200; Referees: Krstič, Ljubič (SLO)

18 October 2015; 16:50	KIF Kolding København (Denmark)	33–31	(North Macedonia) Vardar	Brøndby Hall, Brøndby; Attendance: 2,948; Referees: Dobrovits, Tájok (HUN)
18 October 2015; 16:50	L. Andersson 10	(17–15)	Dibirov, Maqueda 7	Brøndby Hall, Brøndby; Attendance: 2,948; Referees: Dobrovits, Tájok (HUN)
18 October 2015; 16:50	2× (yellow card) 4× (suspension) 1× (red card)	Report	2× (yellow card) 5× (suspension)	Brøndby Hall, Brøndby; Attendance: 2,948; Referees: Dobrovits, Tájok (HUN)

22 October 2015; 19:30	IFK Kristianstad (Sweden)	32–29	(Germany) Rhein-Neckar Löwen	Kristianstad Arena, Kristianstad; Attendance: 4,531; Referees: Gousko, Repkin (BLR)
22 October 2015; 19:30	Jamali 8	(20–12)	Schmid 7	Kristianstad Arena, Kristianstad; Attendance: 4,531; Referees: Gousko, Repkin (BLR)
22 October 2015; 19:30	3× (yellow card) 5× (suspension)	Report	3× (yellow card) 5× (suspension)	Kristianstad Arena, Kristianstad; Attendance: 4,531; Referees: Gousko, Repkin (BLR)

24 October 2015; 17:00	MOL-Pick Szeged (Hungary)	28–27	(France) Montpellier	Városi Sportcsarnok, Szeged; Attendance: 3,200; Referees: Gubica, Milošević (CRO)
24 October 2015; 17:00	Bombač 8	(14–14)	Dolenec 6	Városi Sportcsarnok, Szeged; Attendance: 3,200; Referees: Gubica, Milošević (CRO)
24 October 2015; 17:00	3× (yellow card) 4× (suspension)	Report	3× (yellow card) 5× (suspension) 1× (red card)	Városi Sportcsarnok, Szeged; Attendance: 3,200; Referees: Gubica, Milošević (CRO)

24 October 2015; 17:30	Vardar (North Macedonia)	34–24	(Poland) Vive Tauron Kielce	Jane Sandanski Arena, Skopje; Attendance: 6,000; Referees: Stoļarovs, Līcis (LAT)
24 October 2015; 17:30	Dibirov, Gorbok 8	(18–14)	Aguinagalde 6	Jane Sandanski Arena, Skopje; Attendance: 6,000; Referees: Stoļarovs, Līcis (LAT)
24 October 2015; 17:30	2× (yellow card) 6× (suspension)	Report	3× (yellow card) 8× (suspension)	Jane Sandanski Arena, Skopje; Attendance: 6,000; Referees: Stoļarovs, Līcis (LAT)

24 October 2015; 20:05	Barcelona Lassa (Spain)	28–25	(Denmark) KIF Kolding København	Palau Blaugrana, Barcelona; Attendance: 3,074; Referees: Geipel, Helbig (GER)
24 October 2015; 20:05	Lazarov 10	(11–13)	L. Andersson 8	Palau Blaugrana, Barcelona; Attendance: 3,074; Referees: Geipel, Helbig (GER)
24 October 2015; 20:05	2× (yellow card) 4× (suspension)	Report	3× (yellow card) 4× (suspension)	Palau Blaugrana, Barcelona; Attendance: 3,074; Referees: Geipel, Helbig (GER)

14 November 2015; 19:00	MOL-Pick Szeged (Hungary)	35–28	(Sweden) IFK Kristianstad	Városi Sportcsarnok, Szeged; Attendance: 3,000; Referees: Zotin, Volodkov (RUS)
14 November 2015; 19:00	Källman 8	(19–14)	Jamali 8	Városi Sportcsarnok, Szeged; Attendance: 3,000; Referees: Zotin, Volodkov (RUS)
14 November 2015; 19:00	2× (yellow card) 3× (suspension)	Report	3× (yellow card) 5× (suspension)	Városi Sportcsarnok, Szeged; Attendance: 3,000; Referees: Zotin, Volodkov (RUS)

14 November 2015; 19:30	Barcelona Lassa (Spain)	31–30	(North Macedonia) Vardar	Palau Blaugrana, Barcelona; Attendance: 3,908; Referees: Horáček, Novotný (CZE)
14 November 2015; 19:30	Jallouz 12	(16–13)	Gorbok 8	Palau Blaugrana, Barcelona; Attendance: 3,908; Referees: Horáček, Novotný (CZE)
14 November 2015; 19:30	3× (yellow card) 4× (suspension)	Report	3× (yellow card) 3× (suspension)	Palau Blaugrana, Barcelona; Attendance: 3,908; Referees: Horáček, Novotný (CZE)

15 November 2015; 15:00	Montpellier (France)	28–30	(Germany) Rhein-Neckar Löwen	Park&Suites Arena, Montpellier; Attendance: 6,000; Referees: Santos, Fonseca (POR)
15 November 2015; 15:00	five players 4	(15–16)	Ekdahl du Rietz 7	Park&Suites Arena, Montpellier; Attendance: 6,000; Referees: Santos, Fonseca (POR)
15 November 2015; 15:00	3× (yellow card) 3× (suspension)	Report	2× (yellow card) 2× (suspension)	Park&Suites Arena, Montpellier; Attendance: 6,000; Referees: Santos, Fonseca (POR)

15 November 2015; 16:50	KIF Kolding København (Denmark)	25–33	(Poland) Vive Tauron Kielce	Brøndby Hall, Brøndby; Attendance: 4,000; Referees: Jurinović, Mrvica (CRO)
15 November 2015; 16:50	L. Andersson 7	(15–13)	Bielecki 7	Brøndby Hall, Brøndby; Attendance: 4,000; Referees: Jurinović, Mrvica (CRO)
15 November 2015; 16:50	3× (yellow card) 2× (suspension)	Report	2× (yellow card) 1× (suspension)	Brøndby Hall, Brøndby; Attendance: 4,000; Referees: Jurinović, Mrvica (CRO)

18 November 2015; 18:45	Rhein-Neckar Löwen (Germany)	25–21	(France) Montpellier	Fraport Arena, Frankfurt; Attendance: 3,409; Referees: Hansen, Pettersen (NOR)
18 November 2015; 18:45	Groetzki 5	(16–10)	Dolenec 5	Fraport Arena, Frankfurt; Attendance: 3,409; Referees: Hansen, Pettersen (NOR)
18 November 2015; 18:45	3× (yellow card) 2× (suspension)	Report	3× (yellow card) 3× (suspension)	Fraport Arena, Frankfurt; Attendance: 3,409; Referees: Hansen, Pettersen (NOR)

18 November 2015; 19:00	IFK Kristianstad (Sweden)	32–34	(Hungary) MOL-Pick Szeged	Kristianstad Arena, Kristianstad; Attendance: 4,793; Referees: Krstič, Ljubič (SLO)
18 November 2015; 19:00	Jamali 10	(19–16)	Bombač 13	Kristianstad Arena, Kristianstad; Attendance: 4,793; Referees: Krstič, Ljubič (SLO)
18 November 2015; 19:00	3× (yellow card) 5× (suspension)	Report	3× (yellow card) 4× (suspension) 1× (red card)	Kristianstad Arena, Kristianstad; Attendance: 4,793; Referees: Krstič, Ljubič (SLO)

22 November 2015; 17:45	Vardar (North Macedonia)	25–27	(Spain) Barcelona Lassa	Jane Sandanski Arena, Skopje; Attendance: 5,500; Referees: Gjeding, Hansen (DEN)
22 November 2015; 17:45	Gorbok 5	(15–12)	Jallouz 8	Jane Sandanski Arena, Skopje; Attendance: 5,500; Referees: Gjeding, Hansen (DEN)
22 November 2015; 17:45	3× (yellow card) 3× (suspension)	Report	2× (yellow card) 2× (suspension)	Jane Sandanski Arena, Skopje; Attendance: 5,500; Referees: Gjeding, Hansen (DEN)

22 November 2015; 19:00	Vive Tauron Kielce (Poland)	33–31	(Denmark) KIF Kolding København	Hala Legionów, Kielce; Attendance: 4,200; Referees: Pavićević, Ražnatović (MNE)
22 November 2015; 19:00	Bielecki 8	(13–14)	Spellerberg 10	Hala Legionów, Kielce; Attendance: 4,200; Referees: Pavićević, Ražnatović (MNE)
22 November 2015; 19:00	2× (yellow card) 2× (suspension)	Report	3× (yellow card) 4× (suspension)	Hala Legionów, Kielce; Attendance: 4,200; Referees: Pavićević, Ražnatović (MNE)

26 November 2015; 20:45	Rhein-Neckar Löwen (Germany)	29–20	(Sweden) IFK Kristianstad	Fraport Arena, Frankfurt; Attendance: 1,868; Referees: Horáček, Novotný (CZE)
26 November 2015; 20:45	Schmid 11	(15–10)	Tollbring 5	Fraport Arena, Frankfurt; Attendance: 1,868; Referees: Horáček, Novotný (CZE)
26 November 2015; 20:45	2× (yellow card) 1× (suspension)	Report	3× (yellow card) 4× (suspension)	Fraport Arena, Frankfurt; Attendance: 1,868; Referees: Horáček, Novotný (CZE)

28 November 2015; 16:00	Vive Tauron Kielce (Poland)	23–20	(North Macedonia) Vardar	Hala Legionów, Kielce; Attendance: 4,200; Referees: Santos, Fonseca (POR)
28 November 2015; 16:00	Jurecki 5	(10–6)	Gorbok, Marsenić 5	Hala Legionów, Kielce; Attendance: 4,200; Referees: Santos, Fonseca (POR)
28 November 2015; 16:00	3× (yellow card) 3× (suspension) 1× (red card)	Report	3× (yellow card) 4× (suspension)	Hala Legionów, Kielce; Attendance: 4,200; Referees: Santos, Fonseca (POR)

29 November 2015; 16:50	KIF Kolding København (Denmark)	28–36	(Spain) Barcelona Lassa	Brøndby Hall, Brøndby; Attendance: 4,911; Referees: Baďura, Ondogrecula (SVK)
29 November 2015; 16:50	Spellerberg 7	(15–16)	Jallouz 9	Brøndby Hall, Brøndby; Attendance: 4,911; Referees: Baďura, Ondogrecula (SVK)
29 November 2015; 16:50	3× (yellow card) 2× (suspension)	Report	3× (yellow card) 3× (suspension)	Brøndby Hall, Brøndby; Attendance: 4,911; Referees: Baďura, Ondogrecula (SVK)

29 November 2015; 17:00	Montpellier (France)	29–29	(Hungary) MOL-Pick Szeged	Park&Suites Arena, Montpellier; Attendance: 2,850; Referees: Dinu, Din (ROU)
29 November 2015; 17:00	Dolenec 8	(17–17)	Bombač 9	Park&Suites Arena, Montpellier; Attendance: 2,850; Referees: Dinu, Din (ROU)
29 November 2015; 17:00	2× (yellow card) 7× (suspension)	Report	3× (yellow card) 5× (suspension)	Park&Suites Arena, Montpellier; Attendance: 2,850; Referees: Dinu, Din (ROU)

5 December 2015; 17:30	Vardar (North Macedonia)	34–24	(Denmark) KIF Kolding København	Jane Sandanski Arena, Skopje; Attendance: 4,000; Referees: Kiyashko, Kiselev (RUS)
5 December 2015; 17:30	four players 4	(18–8)	Spellerberg 6	Jane Sandanski Arena, Skopje; Attendance: 4,000; Referees: Kiyashko, Kiselev (RUS)
5 December 2015; 17:30	3× (yellow card) 3× (suspension)	Report	2× (yellow card) 1× (suspension)	Jane Sandanski Arena, Skopje; Attendance: 4,000; Referees: Kiyashko, Kiselev (RUS)

5 December 2015; 18:00	IFK Kristianstad (Sweden)	29–30	(France) Montpellier	Kristianstad Arena, Kristianstad; Attendance: 4,851; Referees: Brunovsky, Čanda (SVK)
5 December 2015; 18:00	Cederholm 8	(15–15)	Toumi 8	Kristianstad Arena, Kristianstad; Attendance: 4,851; Referees: Brunovsky, Čanda (SVK)
5 December 2015; 18:00	3× (yellow card) 3× (suspension)	Report	3× (yellow card) 6× (suspension)	Kristianstad Arena, Kristianstad; Attendance: 4,851; Referees: Brunovsky, Čanda (SVK)

5 December 2015; 18:30	Barcelona Lassa (Spain)	31–33	(Poland) Vive Tauron Kielce	Palau Blaugrana, Barcelona; Attendance: 4,231; Referees: Togstad, Kristiansen (NOR)
5 December 2015; 18:30	Lazarov 11	(19–16)	Bielecki 9	Palau Blaugrana, Barcelona; Attendance: 4,231; Referees: Togstad, Kristiansen (NOR)
5 December 2015; 18:30	3× (yellow card) 3× (suspension)	Report	3× (yellow card) 4× (suspension)	Palau Blaugrana, Barcelona; Attendance: 4,231; Referees: Togstad, Kristiansen (NOR)

5 December 2015; 20:45	MOL-Pick Szeged (Hungary)	30–24	(Germany) Rhein-Neckar Löwen	Városi Sportcsarnok, Szeged; Attendance: 3,200; Referees: Stoļarovs, Līcis (LAT)
5 December 2015; 20:45	Bombač 11	(14–12)	Larsen 8	Városi Sportcsarnok, Szeged; Attendance: 3,200; Referees: Stoļarovs, Līcis (LAT)
5 December 2015; 20:45	3× (yellow card) 4× (suspension)	Report	2× (yellow card) 5× (suspension)	Városi Sportcsarnok, Szeged; Attendance: 3,200; Referees: Stoļarovs, Līcis (LAT)

11 February 2016; 19:00	IFK Kristianstad (Sweden)	35–35	(Poland) Vive Tauron Kielce	Kristianstad Arena, Kristianstad; Attendance: 4,653; Referees: Baďura, Ondogrecula (SVK)
11 February 2016; 19:00	Jamali 8	(17—19)	Reichmann 9	Kristianstad Arena, Kristianstad; Attendance: 4,653; Referees: Baďura, Ondogrecula (SVK)
11 February 2016; 19:00	3× (yellow card) 3× (suspension)	Report	3× (yellow card) 3× (suspension)	Kristianstad Arena, Kristianstad; Attendance: 4,653; Referees: Baďura, Ondogrecula (SVK)

11 February 2016; 19:30	Rhein-Neckar Löwen (Germany)	28–27	(North Macedonia) Vardar	Fraport Arena, Frankfurt; Attendance: 3,274; Referees: Mažeika, Gatelis (LTU)
11 February 2016; 19:30	Schmid 10	(14–15)	Gorbok 7	Fraport Arena, Frankfurt; Attendance: 3,274; Referees: Mažeika, Gatelis (LTU)
11 February 2016; 19:30	3× (yellow card) 1× (suspension)	Report	3× (yellow card) 3× (suspension)	Fraport Arena, Frankfurt; Attendance: 3,274; Referees: Mažeika, Gatelis (LTU)

14 February 2016; 17:00	MOL-Pick Szeged (Hungary)	34–23	(Denmark) KIF Kolding København	Városi Sportcsarnok, Szeged; Attendance: 3,100; Referees: Horáček, Novotný (CZE)
14 February 2016; 17:00	García 6	(18–13)	Andersson 5	Városi Sportcsarnok, Szeged; Attendance: 3,100; Referees: Horáček, Novotný (CZE)
14 February 2016; 17:00	3× (yellow card) 2× (suspension)	Report	3× (yellow card) 3× (suspension)	Városi Sportcsarnok, Szeged; Attendance: 3,100; Referees: Horáček, Novotný (CZE)

14 February 2016; 17:00	Montpellier (France)	23–31	(Spain) Barcelona Lassa	Park&Suites Arena, Montpellier; Attendance: 7,500; Referees: Gubica, Milošević (CRO)
14 February 2016; 17:00	Gajič 8	(11–15)	Lazarov 9	Park&Suites Arena, Montpellier; Attendance: 7,500; Referees: Gubica, Milošević (CRO)
14 February 2016; 17:00	3× (yellow card) 2× (suspension)	Report	3× (yellow card) 1× (suspension)	Park&Suites Arena, Montpellier; Attendance: 7,500; Referees: Gubica, Milošević (CRO)

20 February 2016; 17:30	Vardar (North Macedonia)	38–36	(Sweden) IFK Kristianstad	Jane Sandanski Arena, Skopje; Attendance: 4,876; Referees: Kaveshnikov, Plotnikov (RUS)
20 February 2016; 17:30	Cindrić 8	(21–19)	Bjørnsen, Jamali 7	Jane Sandanski Arena, Skopje; Attendance: 4,876; Referees: Kaveshnikov, Plotnikov (RUS)
20 February 2016; 17:30	3× (yellow card) 1× (suspension)	Report	3× (yellow card) 2× (suspension)	Jane Sandanski Arena, Skopje; Attendance: 4,876; Referees: Kaveshnikov, Plotnikov (RUS)

20 February 2016; 17:30	Vive Tauron Kielce (Poland)	28–27	(Germany) Rhein-Neckar Löwen	Hala Legionów, Kielce; Attendance: 4,200; Referees: Elíasson, Pálsson (ISL)
20 February 2016; 17:30	Buntić, Čupić 5	(12–10)	Larsen 6	Hala Legionów, Kielce; Attendance: 4,200; Referees: Elíasson, Pálsson (ISL)
20 February 2016; 17:30	3× (yellow card) 4× (suspension)	Report	3× (yellow card) 5× (suspension)	Hala Legionów, Kielce; Attendance: 4,200; Referees: Elíasson, Pálsson (ISL)

21 February 2016; 16:50	KIF Kolding København (Denmark)	27–26	(France) Montpellier	Kolding-Hallen, Kolding; Attendance: 3,204; Referees: Erdoğan, Özdeniz (TUR)
21 February 2016; 16:50	Igropulo, Laen 6	(14–12)	Toumi 7	Kolding-Hallen, Kolding; Attendance: 3,204; Referees: Erdoğan, Özdeniz (TUR)
21 February 2016; 16:50	3× (yellow card) 2× (suspension)	Report	3× (yellow card) 3× (suspension)	Kolding-Hallen, Kolding; Attendance: 3,204; Referees: Erdoğan, Özdeniz (TUR)

21 February 2016; 17:00	Barcelona Lassa (Spain)	30–25	(Hungary) MOL-Pick Szeged	Palau Blaugrana, Barcelona; Attendance: 4,766; Referees: Dentz, Reibel (FRA)
21 February 2016; 17:00	Jallouz, Lazarov 6	(19–14)	Bombač 6	Palau Blaugrana, Barcelona; Attendance: 4,766; Referees: Dentz, Reibel (FRA)
21 February 2016; 17:00	3× (yellow card) 2× (suspension)	Report	3× (yellow card) 3× (suspension)	Palau Blaugrana, Barcelona; Attendance: 4,766; Referees: Dentz, Reibel (FRA)

25 February 2016; 19:00	IFK Kristianstad (Sweden)	24–31	(Spain) Barcelona Lassa	Kristianstad Arena, Kristianstad; Attendance: 5,112; Referees: Horáček, Novotný (CZE)
25 February 2016; 19:00	Tollbring 4	(12–19)	Lazarov 9	Kristianstad Arena, Kristianstad; Attendance: 5,112; Referees: Horáček, Novotný (CZE)
25 February 2016; 19:00	3× (yellow card) 3× (suspension)	Report	1× (yellow card) 3× (suspension)	Kristianstad Arena, Kristianstad; Attendance: 5,112; Referees: Horáček, Novotný (CZE)

28 February 2016; 17:30	MOL-Pick Szeged (Hungary)	29–31	(North Macedonia) Vardar	Városi Sportcsarnok, Szeged; Attendance: 3,200; Referees: Togstad, Kristiansen (NOR)
28 February 2016; 17:30	Bombač 7	(14–13)	Maqueda 8	Városi Sportcsarnok, Szeged; Attendance: 3,200; Referees: Togstad, Kristiansen (NOR)
28 February 2016; 17:30	3× (yellow card) 4× (suspension)	Report	3× (yellow card) 5× (suspension)	Városi Sportcsarnok, Szeged; Attendance: 3,200; Referees: Togstad, Kristiansen (NOR)

28 February 2016; 17:30	Montpellier (France)	27–32	(Poland) Vive Tauron Kielce	Park&Suites Arena, Montpellier; Attendance: 5,000; Referees: Stoļarovs, Līcis (LAT)
28 February 2016; 17:30	Fabregas 5	(16–17)	Čupić 7	Park&Suites Arena, Montpellier; Attendance: 5,000; Referees: Stoļarovs, Līcis (LAT)
28 February 2016; 17:30	3× (yellow card) 2× (suspension)	Report	3× (yellow card) 4× (suspension)	Park&Suites Arena, Montpellier; Attendance: 5,000; Referees: Stoļarovs, Līcis (LAT)

28 February 2016; 19:30	Rhein-Neckar Löwen (Germany)	24–20	(Denmark) KIF Kolding København	Fraport Arena, Frankfurt; Attendance: 2,824; Referees: Krstič, Ljubič (SLO)
28 February 2016; 19:30	Sigurmannsson 7	(12–11)	Andersson, Spellerberg 5	Fraport Arena, Frankfurt; Attendance: 2,824; Referees: Krstič, Ljubič (SLO)
28 February 2016; 19:30	3× (yellow card) 1× (suspension)	Report	3× (yellow card) 3× (suspension)	Fraport Arena, Frankfurt; Attendance: 2,824; Referees: Krstič, Ljubič (SLO)

5 March 2016; 17:30	Vardar (North Macedonia)	34–26	(France) Montpellier	Jane Sandanski Arena, Skopje; Attendance: 5,000; Referees: Covalciuc, Covalciuc (MDA)
5 March 2016; 17:30	Dujshebaev, Manaskov 7	(17–17)	Gajić 6	Jane Sandanski Arena, Skopje; Attendance: 5,000; Referees: Covalciuc, Covalciuc (MDA)
5 March 2016; 17:30	2× (yellow card) 1× (suspension)	Report	3× (yellow card) 2× (suspension)	Jane Sandanski Arena, Skopje; Attendance: 5,000; Referees: Covalciuc, Covalciuc (MDA)

5 March 2016; 20:30	Barcelona Lassa (Spain)	26–20	(Germany) Rhein-Neckar Löwen	Palau Blaugrana, Barcelona; Attendance: 4,714; Referees: Gjeding, Hansen (DEN)
5 March 2016; 20:30	Jallouz, Lazarov 6	(11–10)	Schmid 5	Palau Blaugrana, Barcelona; Attendance: 4,714; Referees: Gjeding, Hansen (DEN)
5 March 2016; 20:30	2× (yellow card) 3× (suspension)	Report	2× (yellow card)	Palau Blaugrana, Barcelona; Attendance: 4,714; Referees: Gjeding, Hansen (DEN)

6 March 2016; 16:50	KIF Kolding København (Denmark)	21–30	(Sweden) IFK Kristianstad	Brøndby Hall, Brøndby; Attendance: 4,712; Referees: Baumgart, Wild (GER)
6 March 2016; 16:50	Landin Jacobsen 5	(13–11)	Tollbring 6	Brøndby Hall, Brøndby; Attendance: 4,712; Referees: Baumgart, Wild (GER)
6 March 2016; 16:50	3× (yellow card) 7× (suspension) 1× (red card)	Report	3× (yellow card) 8× (suspension) 1× (red card)	Brøndby Hall, Brøndby; Attendance: 4,712; Referees: Baumgart, Wild (GER)

6 March 2016; 18:00	Vive Tauron Kielce (Poland)	27–26	(Hungary) MOL-Pick Szeged	Hala Legionów, Kielce; Attendance: 4,200; Referees: Brunovsky, Čanda (SVK)
6 March 2016; 18:00	Čupić, Štrlek 5	(12–16)	García 6	Hala Legionów, Kielce; Attendance: 4,200; Referees: Brunovsky, Čanda (SVK)
6 March 2016; 18:00	3× (yellow card) 4× (suspension)	Report	3× (yellow card) 4× (suspension)	Hala Legionów, Kielce; Attendance: 4,200; Referees: Brunovsky, Čanda (SVK)

=== Group C ===
Pos	Team	Pld	W	D	L	GF	GA	GD	Pts	Qualification
1	(Belarus) Meshkov Brest	10	8	0	2	321	264	+57	16	Advanced to playoffs
2	(Spain) Logroño	10	7	0	3	298	270	+28	14 (Note: Logroño–Porto 61–58)	Advanced to playoffs
3	(Portugal) Porto	10	7	0	3	296	265	+31	14	
4	(Russia) Chekhovskiye Medvedi	10	4	0	6	271	292	−21	8	
5	(Serbia) Vojvodina	10	2	0	8	241	297	−56	4 (Note: Tatran Prešov–Vojvodina 44–51)	
6	(Slovakia) Tatran Prešov	10	2	0	8	240	279	−39	4	

Source: EHF
Rules for classification: See Tiebreakers
Notes:

17 September 2015; 19:00	Chekhovskiye Medvedi (Russia)	27–26	(Spain) Logroño	Olimpiysky Sport Palace, Chekhov; Attendance: 1,500; Referees: Dobrovits, Tájok (HUN)
17 September 2015; 19:00	A. Kotov 6	(13–13)	Malmagro 8	Olimpiysky Sport Palace, Chekhov; Attendance: 1,500; Referees: Dobrovits, Tájok (HUN)
17 September 2015; 19:00	1× (yellow card) 5× (suspension)	Report	3× (yellow card) 2× (suspension)	Olimpiysky Sport Palace, Chekhov; Attendance: 1,500; Referees: Dobrovits, Tájok (HUN)

19 September 2015; 18:00	Meshkov Brest (Belarus)	34–22	(Serbia) Vojvodina	Universal Sports Complex Victoria, Brest; Attendance: 2,500; Referees: Olesen, Pedersen (DEN)
19 September 2015; 18:00	three players 5	(15–14)	Rastvortsev 7	Universal Sports Complex Victoria, Brest; Attendance: 2,500; Referees: Olesen, Pedersen (DEN)
19 September 2015; 18:00	3× (yellow card) 3× (suspension)	Report	3× (yellow card) 7× (suspension) 1× (red card)	Universal Sports Complex Victoria, Brest; Attendance: 2,500; Referees: Olesen, Pedersen (DEN)

19 September 2015; 18:00	Porto (Portugal)	33–23	(Slovakia) Tatran Prešov	Dragão Caixa, Porto; Attendance: 1,151; Referees: Brkic, Jusufhodzic (AUT)
19 September 2015; 18:00	Duarte, Morales 6	(14–11)	Furlan 7	Dragão Caixa, Porto; Attendance: 1,151; Referees: Brkic, Jusufhodzic (AUT)
19 September 2015; 18:00	3× (yellow card) 5× (suspension)	Report	3× (yellow card) 5× (suspension)	Dragão Caixa, Porto; Attendance: 1,151; Referees: Brkic, Jusufhodzic (AUT)

26 September 2015; 15:00	Tatran Prešov (Slovakia)	20–30	(Belarus) Meshkov Brest	City Hall Prešov, Prešov; Attendance: 2,600; Referees: Stark, Ştefan (ROU)
26 September 2015; 15:00	Antl 5	(11–14)	three players 4	City Hall Prešov, Prešov; Attendance: 2,600; Referees: Stark, Ştefan (ROU)
26 September 2015; 15:00	3× (yellow card) 3× (suspension)	Report	3× (yellow card) 4× (suspension)	City Hall Prešov, Prešov; Attendance: 2,600; Referees: Stark, Ştefan (ROU)

26 September 2015; 18:00	Logroño (Spain)	30–23	(Portugal) Porto	Palacio de los Deportes de La Rioja, Logroño; Attendance: 2,000; Referees: Johansson, Kliko (SWE)
26 September 2015; 18:00	Malmagro 8	(10–12)	Duarte 5	Palacio de los Deportes de La Rioja, Logroño; Attendance: 2,000; Referees: Johansson, Kliko (SWE)
26 September 2015; 18:00	3× (yellow card) 4× (suspension)	Report	3× (yellow card) 5× (suspension)	Palacio de los Deportes de La Rioja, Logroño; Attendance: 2,000; Referees: Johansson, Kliko (SWE)

26 September 2015; 18:00	Vojvodina (Serbia)	26–24	(Russia) Chekhovskiye Medvedi	SC Slana Bara, Novi Sad; Attendance: 1,500; Referees: Santos, Fonseca (POR)
26 September 2015; 18:00	Marjanović 11	(12–13)	Kovalev 10	SC Slana Bara, Novi Sad; Attendance: 1,500; Referees: Santos, Fonseca (POR)
26 September 2015; 18:00	3× (yellow card) 6× (suspension)	Report	3× (yellow card) 5× (suspension)	SC Slana Bara, Novi Sad; Attendance: 1,500; Referees: Santos, Fonseca (POR)

1 October 2015; 19:00	Chekhovskiye Medvedi (Russia)	27–33	(Belarus) Meshkov Brest	Olimpiysky Sport Palace, Chekhov; Attendance: 1,460; Referees: Baumgart, Wild (GER)
1 October 2015; 19:00	K. Kotov 6	(14–17)	Stojković 10	Olimpiysky Sport Palace, Chekhov; Attendance: 1,460; Referees: Baumgart, Wild (GER)
1 October 2015; 19:00	3× (yellow card) 2× (suspension)	Report	3× (yellow card) 2× (suspension)	Olimpiysky Sport Palace, Chekhov; Attendance: 1,460; Referees: Baumgart, Wild (GER)

1 October 2015; 19:30	Vojvodina (Serbia)	23–27	(Portugal) Porto	SC Slana Bara, Novi Sad; Attendance: 4,000; Referees: Kékes, Kékes (HUN)
1 October 2015; 19:30	Nikolić 6	(8–14)	Areia, Duarte 5	SC Slana Bara, Novi Sad; Attendance: 4,000; Referees: Kékes, Kékes (HUN)
1 October 2015; 19:30	3× (yellow card) 4× (suspension)	Report	3× (yellow card) 5× (suspension)	SC Slana Bara, Novi Sad; Attendance: 4,000; Referees: Kékes, Kékes (HUN)

3 October 2015; 16:00	Logroño (Spain)	37–29	(Slovakia) Tatran Prešov	Palacio de los Deportes de La Rioja, Logroño; Attendance: 2,000; Referees: Pavićević, Ražnatović (MNE)
3 October 2015; 16:00	Fernández Pérez 14	(22–15)	Antl, Sadovyi 8	Palacio de los Deportes de La Rioja, Logroño; Attendance: 2,000; Referees: Pavićević, Ražnatović (MNE)
3 October 2015; 16:00	3× (yellow card) 4× (suspension)	Report	2× (yellow card) 7× (suspension) 1× (red card)	Palacio de los Deportes de La Rioja, Logroño; Attendance: 2,000; Referees: Pavićević, Ražnatović (MNE)

7 October 2015; 20:00	Meshkov Brest (Belarus)	31–33	(Spain) Logroño	Universal Sports Complex Victoria, Brest; Attendance: 3,000; Referees: Nikolov, Nachevski (MKD)
7 October 2015; 20:00	Atman 6	(17–15)	Malmagro 9	Universal Sports Complex Victoria, Brest; Attendance: 3,000; Referees: Nikolov, Nachevski (MKD)
7 October 2015; 20:00	3× (yellow card) 3× (suspension)	Report	3× (yellow card) 2× (suspension)	Universal Sports Complex Victoria, Brest; Attendance: 3,000; Referees: Nikolov, Nachevski (MKD)

10 October 2015; 15:30	Tatran Prešov (Slovakia)	19–27	(Serbia) Vojvodina	City Hall Prešov, Prešov; Attendance: 1,227; Referees: Kurtagic, Wetterwik (SWE)
10 October 2015; 15:30	Peskov 5	(10–14)	Marjanović 7	City Hall Prešov, Prešov; Attendance: 1,227; Referees: Kurtagic, Wetterwik (SWE)
10 October 2015; 15:30	3× (yellow card) 1× (suspension)	Report	3× (yellow card) 2× (suspension)	City Hall Prešov, Prešov; Attendance: 1,227; Referees: Kurtagic, Wetterwik (SWE)

10 October 2015; 18:00	Porto (Portugal)	31–27	(Russia) Chekhovskiye Medvedi	Dragão Caixa, Porto; Attendance: 1,705; Referees: Pichon, Reveret (FRA)
10 October 2015; 18:00	Santos 7	(12–14)	Shelestyukov 6	Dragão Caixa, Porto; Attendance: 1,705; Referees: Pichon, Reveret (FRA)
10 October 2015; 18:00	3× (yellow card) 7× (suspension)	Report	3× (yellow card) 7× (suspension)	Dragão Caixa, Porto; Attendance: 1,705; Referees: Pichon, Reveret (FRA)

17 October 2015; 18:00	Porto (Portugal)	29–28	(Belarus) Meshkov Brest	Dragão Caixa, Porto; Attendance: 2,012; Referees: Leandersson, Lindroos (FIN)
17 October 2015; 18:00	Duarte 5	(16–11)	Stojković 9	Dragão Caixa, Porto; Attendance: 2,012; Referees: Leandersson, Lindroos (FIN)
17 October 2015; 18:00	3× (yellow card) 6× (suspension) 1× (red card)	Report	3× (yellow card) 5× (suspension)	Dragão Caixa, Porto; Attendance: 2,012; Referees: Leandersson, Lindroos (FIN)

17 October 2015; 18:00	Vojvodina (Serbia)	26–31	(Spain) Logroño	SC Slana Bara, Novi Sad; Attendance: 3,000; Referees: Covalciuc, Covalciuc (MDA)
17 October 2015; 18:00	Nikolić, Todorović 5	(11–16)	Fernández Pérez 8	SC Slana Bara, Novi Sad; Attendance: 3,000; Referees: Covalciuc, Covalciuc (MDA)
17 October 2015; 18:00	2× (yellow card) 2× (suspension)	Report	3× (yellow card) 3× (suspension)	SC Slana Bara, Novi Sad; Attendance: 3,000; Referees: Covalciuc, Covalciuc (MDA)

18 October 2015; 18:00	Tatran Prešov (Slovakia)	27–21	(Russia) Chekhovskiye Medvedi	City Hall Prešov, Prešov; Attendance: 2,100; Referees: Ferenc, Oláh (HUN)
18 October 2015; 18:00	Hrstka 8	(12–12)	Kovalev 10	City Hall Prešov, Prešov; Attendance: 2,100; Referees: Ferenc, Oláh (HUN)
18 October 2015; 18:00	2× (yellow card) 3× (suspension)	Report	1× (yellow card) 6× (suspension)	City Hall Prešov, Prešov; Attendance: 2,100; Referees: Ferenc, Oláh (HUN)

22 October 2015; 19:00	Chekhovskiye Medvedi (Russia)	29–28	(Slovakia) Tatran Prešov	Olimpiysky Sport Palace, Chekhov; Attendance: 1,200; Referees: Dinu, Din (ROU)
22 October 2015; 19:00	Kovalev 6	(15–15)	Hrstka 8	Olimpiysky Sport Palace, Chekhov; Attendance: 1,200; Referees: Dinu, Din (ROU)
22 October 2015; 19:00	3× (yellow card) 6× (suspension)	Report	3× (yellow card) 4× (suspension)	Olimpiysky Sport Palace, Chekhov; Attendance: 1,200; Referees: Dinu, Din (ROU)

24 October 2015; 18:00	Logroño (Spain)	31–22	(Serbia) Vojvodina	Palacio de los Deportes de La Rioja, Logroño; Attendance: 2,000; Referees: Leszczynski, Piechota (POL)
24 October 2015; 18:00	Malmagro 8	(15–9)	Orbović 5	Palacio de los Deportes de La Rioja, Logroño; Attendance: 2,000; Referees: Leszczynski, Piechota (POL)
24 October 2015; 18:00	3× (yellow card) 2× (suspension)	Report	3× (yellow card) 4× (suspension)	Palacio de los Deportes de La Rioja, Logroño; Attendance: 2,000; Referees: Leszczynski, Piechota (POL)

24 October 2015; 18:00	Meshkov Brest (Belarus)	34–27	(Portugal) Porto	Universal Sports Complex Victoria, Brest; Attendance: 2,500; Referees: Mažeika, Gatelis (LTU)
24 October 2015; 18:00	Nikulenkau, Stojković 6	(17–12)	Morales 7	Universal Sports Complex Victoria, Brest; Attendance: 2,500; Referees: Mažeika, Gatelis (LTU)
24 October 2015; 18:00	3× (yellow card) 4× (suspension)	Report	3× (yellow card) 4× (suspension) 1× (red card)	Universal Sports Complex Victoria, Brest; Attendance: 2,500; Referees: Mažeika, Gatelis (LTU)

11 November 2015; 20:00	Tatran Prešov (Slovakia)	24–25	(Portugal) Porto	City Hall Prešov, Prešov; Attendance: 3,120; Referees: Covalciuc, Covalciuc (MDA)
11 November 2015; 20:00	Antl 7	(10–14)	Borges	City Hall Prešov, Prešov; Attendance: 3,120; Referees: Covalciuc, Covalciuc (MDA)
11 November 2015; 20:00	3× (yellow card) 4× (suspension)	Report	2× (yellow card) 6× (suspension)	City Hall Prešov, Prešov; Attendance: 3,120; Referees: Covalciuc, Covalciuc (MDA)

14 November 2015; 18:00	Logroño (Spain)	30–25	(Russia) Chekhovskiye Medvedi	Palacio de los Deportes de La Rioja, Logroño; Attendance: 2,000; Referees: Erdoğan, Özdeniz (TUR)
14 November 2015; 18:00	Malmagaro, Vígo 7	(14–14)	Chernoivanov 6	Palacio de los Deportes de La Rioja, Logroño; Attendance: 2,000; Referees: Erdoğan, Özdeniz (TUR)
14 November 2015; 18:00	3× (yellow card) 2× (suspension)	Report	4× (yellow card) 2× (suspension)	Palacio de los Deportes de La Rioja, Logroño; Attendance: 2,000; Referees: Erdoğan, Özdeniz (TUR)

14 November 2015; 18:00	Vojvodina (Serbia)	26–35	(Belarus) Meshkov Brest	SC Slana Bara, Novi Sad; Attendance: 800; Referees: Dentz, Reibel (FRA)
14 November 2015; 18:00	Marjanović, Stanković 6	(12–20)	Stojković 9	SC Slana Bara, Novi Sad; Attendance: 800; Referees: Dentz, Reibel (FRA)
14 November 2015; 18:00	3× (yellow card) 2× (suspension)	Report	3× (yellow card) 3× (suspension)	SC Slana Bara, Novi Sad; Attendance: 800; Referees: Dentz, Reibel (FRA)

19 November 2015; 19:00	Chekhovskiye Medvedi (Russia)	34–30	(Serbia) Vojvodina	Olimpiysky Sport Palace, Chekhov; Attendance: 1,900; Referees: Leandersson, Lindroos (FIN)
19 November 2015; 19:00	Andreev, Kovalev 6	(19–14)	Nikolić 10	Olimpiysky Sport Palace, Chekhov; Attendance: 1,900; Referees: Leandersson, Lindroos (FIN)
19 November 2015; 19:00	3× (yellow card) 2× (suspension)	Report	3× (yellow card)	Olimpiysky Sport Palace, Chekhov; Attendance: 1,900; Referees: Leandersson, Lindroos (FIN)

21 November 2015; 18:00	Meshkov Brest (Belarus)	32–26	(Slovakia) Tatran Prešov	Universal Sports Complex Victoria, Brest; Attendance: 3,200; Referees: Horváth, Marton (HUN)
21 November 2015; 18:00	Atman 8	(17–12)	Antl 5	Universal Sports Complex Victoria, Brest; Attendance: 3,200; Referees: Horváth, Marton (HUN)
21 November 2015; 18:00	3× (yellow card) 3× (suspension)	Report	3× (yellow card) 5× (suspension)	Universal Sports Complex Victoria, Brest; Attendance: 3,200; Referees: Horváth, Marton (HUN)

21 November 2015; 18:00	Porto (Portugal)	35–31	(Spain) Logroño	Dragão Caixa, Porto; Attendance: 1,915; Referees: Olesen, Pedersen (DEN)
21 November 2015; 18:00	Morales 7	(15–14)	García Rubio 8	Dragão Caixa, Porto; Attendance: 1,915; Referees: Olesen, Pedersen (DEN)
21 November 2015; 18:00	3× (yellow card) 6× (suspension) 1× (red card)	Report	3× (yellow card) 3× (suspension)	Dragão Caixa, Porto; Attendance: 1,915; Referees: Olesen, Pedersen (DEN)

26 November 2015; 19:00	Chekhovskiye Medvedi (Russia)	30–29	(Portugal) Porto	Olimpiysky Sport Palace, Chekhov; Attendance: 1,500; Referees: Andorka, Hucker (HUN)
26 November 2015; 19:00	Chernoivanov 6	(16–15)	Areia 11	Olimpiysky Sport Palace, Chekhov; Attendance: 1,500; Referees: Andorka, Hucker (HUN)
26 November 2015; 19:00	2× (yellow card) 2× (suspension)	Report	3× (yellow card) 3× (suspension)	Olimpiysky Sport Palace, Chekhov; Attendance: 1,500; Referees: Andorka, Hucker (HUN)

26 November 2015; 19:30	Vojvodina (Serbia)	24–25	(Slovakia) Tatran Prešov	SC Slana Bara, Novi Sad; Attendance: 500; Referees: Tzaferopoulos, Bethmann (GRE)
26 November 2015; 19:30	Orbović 7	(14–14)	Hrstka 7	SC Slana Bara, Novi Sad; Attendance: 500; Referees: Tzaferopoulos, Bethmann (GRE)
26 November 2015; 19:30	3× (yellow card) 3× (suspension)	Report	3× (yellow card) 2× (suspension)	SC Slana Bara, Novi Sad; Attendance: 500; Referees: Tzaferopoulos, Bethmann (GRE)

28 November 2015; 18:00	Logroño (Spain)	28–32	(Belarus) Meshkov Brest	Palacio de los Deportes de La Rioja, Logroño; Attendance: 3,000; Referees: Lah, Sok (SLO)
28 November 2015; 18:00	Malmagro 9	(11–17)	three players 7	Palacio de los Deportes de La Rioja, Logroño; Attendance: 3,000; Referees: Lah, Sok (SLO)
28 November 2015; 18:00	3× (yellow card) 4× (suspension)	Report	3× (yellow card) 8× (suspension) 1× (red card)	Palacio de los Deportes de La Rioja, Logroño; Attendance: 3,000; Referees: Lah, Sok (SLO)

5 December 2015; 16:00	Porto (Portugal)	37–15	(Serbia) Vojvodina	Dragão Caixa, Porto; Attendance: 1,870; Referees: Gasmi, Gasmi (FRA)
5 December 2015; 16:00	Areia, Silva Moreira 5	(16–7)	Todorović 3	Dragão Caixa, Porto; Attendance: 1,870; Referees: Gasmi, Gasmi (FRA)
5 December 2015; 16:00	3× (yellow card) 2× (suspension)	Report	3× (yellow card) 4× (suspension)	Dragão Caixa, Porto; Attendance: 1,870; Referees: Gasmi, Gasmi (FRA)

5 December 2015; 18:00	Meshkov Brest (Belarus)	32–26	(Russia) Chekhovskiye Medvedi	Universal Sports Complex Victoria, Brest; Attendance: 3,300; Referees: Stark, Ştefan (ROU)
5 December 2015; 18:00	Stojković 8	(15–13)	Kovalev 9	Universal Sports Complex Victoria, Brest; Attendance: 3,300; Referees: Stark, Ştefan (ROU)
5 December 2015; 18:00	3× (yellow card) 3× (suspension)	Report	3× (yellow card) 5× (suspension)	Universal Sports Complex Victoria, Brest; Attendance: 3,300; Referees: Stark, Ştefan (ROU)

5 December 2015; 18:30	Tatran Prešov (Slovakia)	19–21	(Spain) Logroño	City Hall Prešov, Prešov; Attendance: 2,283; Referees: Jurinović, Mrvica (CRO)
5 December 2015; 18:30	Antl 6	(8–6)	Molina 7	City Hall Prešov, Prešov; Attendance: 2,283; Referees: Jurinović, Mrvica (CRO)
5 December 2015; 18:30	3× (yellow card) 3× (suspension)	Report	2× (yellow card) 4× (suspension)	City Hall Prešov, Prešov; Attendance: 2,283; Referees: Jurinović, Mrvica (CRO)

=== Group D ===
Pos	Team	Pld	W	D	L	GF	GA	GD	Pts	Qualification
1	(Ukraine) Motor Zaporizhzhia	10	7	1	2	296	277	+19	15	Advanced to playoffs
2	(Denmark) Skjern Håndbold	10	6	2	2	293	271	+22	14	Advanced to playoffs
3	(Switzerland) Kadetten Schaffhausen	10	5	1	4	270	270	0	11	
4	(Romania) HC Baia Mare	10	3	3	4	264	268	−4	9	
5	(Norway) Elverum Håndball	10	3	1	6	274	289	−15	7	
6	(North Macedonia) Metalurg Skopje	10	2	0	8	219	241	−22	4	

Source: EHF
Rules for classification: Tiebreakers

17 September 2015; 20:00	Kadetten Schaffhausen (Switzerland)	30–31	(Norway) Elverum Håndball	BBC-Arena, Schaffhausen; Attendance: 1,050; Referees: Marín, García (ESP)
17 September 2015; 20:00	Liniger 8	(15–16)	Mitrović 9	BBC-Arena, Schaffhausen; Attendance: 1,050; Referees: Marín, García (ESP)
17 September 2015; 20:00	3× (yellow card) 4× (suspension)	Report	3× (yellow card) 2× (suspension)	BBC-Arena, Schaffhausen; Attendance: 1,050; Referees: Marín, García (ESP)

19 September 2015; 18:30	Motor Zaporizhzhia (Ukraine)	30–24	(North Macedonia) Metalurg Skopje	Palace of Sport, Brovary; Attendance: 1,000; Referees: Dentz, Reibel (FRA)
19 September 2015; 18:30	Burka 9	(13–9)	Božović 10	Palace of Sport, Brovary; Attendance: 1,000; Referees: Dentz, Reibel (FRA)
19 September 2015; 18:30	3× (yellow card) 3× (suspension)	Report	3× (yellow card) 4× (suspension)	Palace of Sport, Brovary; Attendance: 1,000; Referees: Dentz, Reibel (FRA)

20 September 2015; 16:50	Skjern Håndbold (Denmark)	32–28	(Romania) HC Baia Mare	Skjern Bank Arena, Skjern; Attendance: 2,247; Referees: Leszczyński, Piechota (POL)
20 September 2015; 16:50	Mikkelsen 9	(17–12)	Sadoveac 8	Skjern Bank Arena, Skjern; Attendance: 2,247; Referees: Leszczyński, Piechota (POL)
20 September 2015; 16:50	3× (yellow card) 4× (suspension)	Report	3× (yellow card) 3× (suspension)	Skjern Bank Arena, Skjern; Attendance: 2,247; Referees: Leszczyński, Piechota (POL)

26 September 2015; 17:30	Metalurg Skopje (North Macedonia)	28–24	(Switzerland) Kadetten Schaffhausen	Boris Trajkovski Sports Center, Skopje; Attendance: 3,500; Referees: Covalciuc, Covalciuc (MDA)
26 September 2015; 17:30	Božović 8	(15–11)	Császár 7	Boris Trajkovski Sports Center, Skopje; Attendance: 3,500; Referees: Covalciuc, Covalciuc (MDA)
26 September 2015; 17:30	3× (yellow card) 2× (suspension)	Report	3× (yellow card) 1× (suspension)	Boris Trajkovski Sports Center, Skopje; Attendance: 3,500; Referees: Covalciuc, Covalciuc (MDA)

27 September 2015; 15:15	Elverum Håndball (Norway)	23–37	(Denmark) Skjern Håndbold	Elverumshallen, Elverum; Attendance: 2,017; Referees: Schulze, Tönnies (GER)
27 September 2015; 15:15	Lindboe 9	(12–18)	Mikkelsen, Rasmussen 8	Elverumshallen, Elverum; Attendance: 2,017; Referees: Schulze, Tönnies (GER)
27 September 2015; 15:15	2× (yellow card) 1× (suspension)	Report	3× (yellow card) 6× (suspension)	Elverumshallen, Elverum; Attendance: 2,017; Referees: Schulze, Tönnies (GER)

27 September 2015; 18:00	HC Baia Mare (Romania)	35–30	(Ukraine) Motor Zaporizhzhia	Sala Sporturilor "Lascăr Pană", Baia Mare; Attendance: 2,200; Referees: Konjičanin, Konjičanin (BIH)
27 September 2015; 18:00	Iváncsik 11	(18–14)	Malašinskas, Pukhouski 7	Sala Sporturilor "Lascăr Pană", Baia Mare; Attendance: 2,200; Referees: Konjičanin, Konjičanin (BIH)
27 September 2015; 18:00	3× (yellow card)	Report	3× (yellow card)	Sala Sporturilor "Lascăr Pană", Baia Mare; Attendance: 2,200; Referees: Konjičanin, Konjičanin (BIH)

3 October 2015; 17:30	Metalurg Skopje (North Macedonia)	22–19	(Norway) Elverum Håndball	Boris Trajkovski Sports Center, Skopje; Attendance: 3,500; Referees: Kaveshnikov, Plotnikov (RUS)
3 October 2015; 17:30	Božović 6	(10–12)	Mitrović 6	Boris Trajkovski Sports Center, Skopje; Attendance: 3,500; Referees: Kaveshnikov, Plotnikov (RUS)
3 October 2015; 17:30	3× (yellow card) 1× (suspension)	Report	2× (yellow card) 3× (suspension)	Boris Trajkovski Sports Center, Skopje; Attendance: 3,500; Referees: Kaveshnikov, Plotnikov (RUS)

4 October 2015; 16:10	Motor Zaporizhzhia (Ukraine)	31–26	(Denmark) Skjern Håndbold	Palace of Sport, Brovary; Attendance: 1,800; Referees: Vešović, Mitrović (MNE)
4 October 2015; 16:10	Malašinskas 8	(15–13)	Myrhol 5	Palace of Sport, Brovary; Attendance: 1,800; Referees: Vešović, Mitrović (MNE)
4 October 2015; 16:10	3× (yellow card) 2× (suspension)	Report	3× (yellow card) 2× (suspension)	Palace of Sport, Brovary; Attendance: 1,800; Referees: Vešović, Mitrović (MNE)

4 October 2015; 18:00	HC Baia Mare (Romania)	31–31	(Switzerland) Kadetten Schaffhausen	Sala Sporturilor "Lascăr Pană", Baia Mare; Attendance: 2,080; Referees: Gasmi, Gasmi (FRA)
4 October 2015; 18:00	Iváncsik, Ostroushko 8	(16–18)	Liniger 8	Sala Sporturilor "Lascăr Pană", Baia Mare; Attendance: 2,080; Referees: Gasmi, Gasmi (FRA)
4 October 2015; 18:00	3× (yellow card) 5× (suspension)	Report	3× (yellow card) 5× (suspension)	Sala Sporturilor "Lascăr Pană", Baia Mare; Attendance: 2,080; Referees: Gasmi, Gasmi (FRA)

8 October 2015; 20:00	Kadetten Schaffhausen (Switzerland)	30–27	(Ukraine) Motor Zaporizhzhia	BBC-Arena, Schaffhausen; Attendance: 1,810; Referees: Mažeika, Gatelis (LTU)
8 October 2015; 20:00	Császár 14	(15–8)	Kozakevych 6	BBC-Arena, Schaffhausen; Attendance: 1,810; Referees: Mažeika, Gatelis (LTU)
8 October 2015; 20:00	2× (yellow card) 6× (suspension)	Report	3× (yellow card) 5× (suspension) 1× (red card)	BBC-Arena, Schaffhausen; Attendance: 1,810; Referees: Mažeika, Gatelis (LTU)

11 October 2015; 15:10	Skjern Håndbold (Denmark)	20–19	(North Macedonia) Metalurg Skopje	Skjern Bank Arena, Skjern; Attendance: 2,600; Referees: Erdoğan, Özdeniz (TUR)
11 October 2015; 15:10	Olsson 6	(8–10)	Božović 11	Skjern Bank Arena, Skjern; Attendance: 2,600; Referees: Erdoğan, Özdeniz (TUR)
11 October 2015; 15:10	3× (yellow card)	Report	3× (yellow card) 4× (suspension)	Skjern Bank Arena, Skjern; Attendance: 2,600; Referees: Erdoğan, Özdeniz (TUR)

11 October 2015; 16:15	Elverum Håndball (Norway)	28–28	(Romania) HC Baia Mare	Elverumshallen, Elverum; Attendance: 1,479; Referees: Stoļarovs, Līcis (LAT)
11 October 2015; 16:15	Lindboe 6	(9–14)	Ramba 6	Elverumshallen, Elverum; Attendance: 1,479; Referees: Stoļarovs, Līcis (LAT)
11 October 2015; 16:15	2× (yellow card) 3× (suspension)	Report	1× (yellow card) 4× (suspension)	Elverumshallen, Elverum; Attendance: 1,479; Referees: Stoļarovs, Līcis (LAT)

15 October 2015; 19:30	Kadetten Schaffhausen (Switzerland)	24–30	(Denmark) Skjern Håndbold	BBC-Arena, Schaffhausen; Attendance: 2,260; Referees: Baumgart, Wild (GER)
15 October 2015; 19:30	Császár 11	(13–12)	Myrhol 6	BBC-Arena, Schaffhausen; Attendance: 2,260; Referees: Baumgart, Wild (GER)
15 October 2015; 19:30	3× (yellow card) 4× (suspension)	Report	3× (yellow card) 4× (suspension)	BBC-Arena, Schaffhausen; Attendance: 2,260; Referees: Baumgart, Wild (GER)

18 October 2015; 16:00	HC Baia Mare (Romania)	21–20	(North Macedonia) Metalurg Skopje	Sala Sporturilor "Lascăr Pană", Baia Mare; Attendance: 2,400; Referees: Caçador, Nicolau (POR)
18 October 2015; 16:00	Iváncsik 6	(10–9)	Božović 8	Sala Sporturilor "Lascăr Pană", Baia Mare; Attendance: 2,400; Referees: Caçador, Nicolau (POR)
18 October 2015; 16:00	3× (yellow card) 2× (suspension)	Report	3× (yellow card) 1× (suspension)	Sala Sporturilor "Lascăr Pană", Baia Mare; Attendance: 2,400; Referees: Caçador, Nicolau (POR)

18 October 2015; 16:15	Elverum Håndball (Norway)	29–30	(Ukraine) Motor Zaporizhzhia	Elverumshallen, Elverum; Attendance: 1,559; Referees: Kurtagic, Wetterwik (SWE)
18 October 2015; 16:15	Lindboe 9	(15–12)	Pukhouski 11	Elverumshallen, Elverum; Attendance: 1,559; Referees: Kurtagic, Wetterwik (SWE)
18 October 2015; 16:15	3× (yellow card) 3× (suspension)	Report	3× (yellow card) 4× (suspension) 1× (red card)	Elverumshallen, Elverum; Attendance: 1,559; Referees: Kurtagic, Wetterwik (SWE)

24 October 2015; 18:30	Motor Zaporizhzhia (Ukraine)	33–30	(Norway) Elverum Håndball	Palace of Sport, Brovary; Attendance: 1,800; Referees: Pandžić, Mošorinski (SRB)
24 October 2015; 18:30	Burka, Shelmenko 7	(14–15)	Mitrović 8	Palace of Sport, Brovary; Attendance: 1,800; Referees: Pandžić, Mošorinski (SRB)
24 October 2015; 18:30	3× (yellow card) 2× (suspension)	Report	3× (yellow card) 4× (suspension)	Palace of Sport, Brovary; Attendance: 1,800; Referees: Pandžić, Mošorinski (SRB)

25 October 2015; 16:50	Skjern Håndbold (Denmark)	25–29	(Switzerland) Kadetten Schaffhausen	Skjern Bank Arena, Skjern; Attendance: 3,088; Referees: Tzaferopoulos, Bethmann (GRE)
25 October 2015; 16:50	Olsson 6	(13–12)	Liniger 7	Skjern Bank Arena, Skjern; Attendance: 3,088; Referees: Tzaferopoulos, Bethmann (GRE)
25 October 2015; 16:50	3× (yellow card) 2× (suspension)	Report	3× (yellow card) 3× (suspension)	Skjern Bank Arena, Skjern; Attendance: 3,088; Referees: Tzaferopoulos, Bethmann (GRE)

25 October 2015; 17:30	Metalurg Skopje (North Macedonia)	21–23	(Romania) HC Baia Mare	Boris Trajkovski Sports Center, Skopje; Attendance: 4,500; Referees: Kékes, Kékes (HUN)
25 October 2015; 17:30	Božović 6	(9–13)	four players 4	Boris Trajkovski Sports Center, Skopje; Attendance: 4,500; Referees: Kékes, Kékes (HUN)
25 October 2015; 17:30	3× (yellow card) 3× (suspension)	Report	3× (yellow card) 7× (suspension) 1× (red card)	Boris Trajkovski Sports Center, Skopje; Attendance: 4,500; Referees: Kékes, Kékes (HUN)

12 November 2015; 17:45	Metalurg Skopje (North Macedonia)	21–23	(Ukraine) Motor Zaporizhzhia	Boris Trajkovski Sports Center, Skopje; Attendance: 4,153; Referees: Johansson, Kliko (SWE)
12 November 2015; 17:45	Božović 5	(12–9)	Shelmenko 7	Boris Trajkovski Sports Center, Skopje; Attendance: 4,153; Referees: Johansson, Kliko (SWE)
12 November 2015; 17:45	3× (yellow card) 6× (suspension) 1× (red card)	Report	2× (yellow card) 4× (suspension)	Boris Trajkovski Sports Center, Skopje; Attendance: 4,153; Referees: Johansson, Kliko (SWE)

15 November 2015; 16:00	HC Baia Mare (Romania)	28–28	(Denmark) Skjern Håndbold	Sala Sporturilor "Lascăr Pană", Baia Mare; Attendance: 2,000; Referees: Kaveshnikov, Plotnikov (RUS)
15 November 2015; 16:00	Sadoveac 7	(15–11)	Olsson 7	Sala Sporturilor "Lascăr Pană", Baia Mare; Attendance: 2,000; Referees: Kaveshnikov, Plotnikov (RUS)
15 November 2015; 16:00	2× (yellow card) 5× (suspension)	Report	3× (yellow card) 8× (suspension) 1× (red card)	Sala Sporturilor "Lascăr Pană", Baia Mare; Attendance: 2,000; Referees: Kaveshnikov, Plotnikov (RUS)

15 November 2015; 16:15	Elverum Håndball (Norway)	27–28	(Switzerland) Kadetten Schaffhausen	Elverumshallen, Elverum; Attendance: 1,553; Referees: Gubica, Milošević (CRO)
15 November 2015; 16:15	Øverby 8	(11–15)	four players 5	Elverumshallen, Elverum; Attendance: 1,553; Referees: Gubica, Milošević (CRO)
15 November 2015; 16:15	3× (yellow card) 2× (suspension)	Report	2× (yellow card) 2× (suspension)	Elverumshallen, Elverum; Attendance: 1,553; Referees: Gubica, Milošević (CRO)

19 November 2015; 20:00	Kadetten Schaffhausen (Switzerland)	27–17	(North Macedonia) Metalurg Skopje	BBC-Arena, Schaffhausen; Attendance: 2,340; Referees: Álvarez, Bustamante (ESP)
19 November 2015; 20:00	Liniger 9	(10–10)	Božović 4	BBC-Arena, Schaffhausen; Attendance: 2,340; Referees: Álvarez, Bustamante (ESP)
19 November 2015; 20:00	2× (yellow card) 2× (suspension)	Report	3× (yellow card) 1× (suspension)	BBC-Arena, Schaffhausen; Attendance: 2,340; Referees: Álvarez, Bustamante (ESP)

21 November 2015; 18:00	Motor Zaporizhzhia (Ukraine)	25–23	(Romania) HC Baia Mare	Palace of Sport, Brovary; Attendance: 1,800; Referees: Marín, García (ESP)
21 November 2015; 18:00	Burka 8	(14–11)	Karačić 8	Palace of Sport, Brovary; Attendance: 1,800; Referees: Marín, García (ESP)
21 November 2015; 18:00	3× (yellow card) 5× (suspension)	Report	3× (yellow card) 4× (suspension)	Palace of Sport, Brovary; Attendance: 1,800; Referees: Marín, García (ESP)

22 November 2015; 16:50	Skjern Håndbold (Denmark)	34–29	(Norway) Elverum Håndball	Skjern Bank Arena, Skjern; Attendance: 2,950; Referees: Pandžić, Šatordžija (BIH)
22 November 2015; 16:50	three players 6	(17–10)	Lindboe 8	Skjern Bank Arena, Skjern; Attendance: 2,950; Referees: Pandžić, Šatordžija (BIH)
22 November 2015; 16:50	3× (yellow card) 5× (suspension)	Report	3× (yellow card) 5× (suspension)	Skjern Bank Arena, Skjern; Attendance: 2,950; Referees: Pandžić, Šatordžija (BIH)

28 November 2015; 18:00	Motor Zaporizhzhia (Ukraine)	31–23	(Switzerland) Kadetten Schaffhausen	Palace of Sport, Brovary; Attendance: 1,900; Referees: Panayides, Andreou (CYP)
28 November 2015; 18:00	Pukhouski 11	(13–9)	Liniger 7	Palace of Sport, Brovary; Attendance: 1,900; Referees: Panayides, Andreou (CYP)
28 November 2015; 18:00	3× (yellow card) 1× (suspension)	Report	3× (yellow card) 3× (suspension) 1× (red card)	Palace of Sport, Brovary; Attendance: 1,900; Referees: Panayides, Andreou (CYP)

29 November 2015; 18:00	HC Baia Mare (Romania)	24–29	(Norway) Elverum Håndball	Sala Sporturilor "Lascăr Pană", Baia Mare; Attendance: 2,000; Referees: Dentz, Reibel (FRA)
29 November 2015; 18:00	Ostroushko 9	(10–19)	Stegavik 10	Sala Sporturilor "Lascăr Pană", Baia Mare; Attendance: 2,000; Referees: Dentz, Reibel (FRA)
29 November 2015; 18:00	3× (yellow card) 2× (suspension)	Report	3× (yellow card) 3× (suspension)	Sala Sporturilor "Lascăr Pană", Baia Mare; Attendance: 2,000; Referees: Dentz, Reibel (FRA)

29 November 2015; 18:30	Metalurg Skopje (North Macedonia)	24–25	(Denmark) Skjern Håndbold	Boris Trajkovski Sports Center, Skopje; Attendance: 2,680; Referees: Brkic, Jusufhodzic (AUT)
29 November 2015; 18:30	Božović 8	(11–13)	Mikkelsen 6	Boris Trajkovski Sports Center, Skopje; Attendance: 2,680; Referees: Brkic, Jusufhodzic (AUT)
29 November 2015; 18:30	3× (yellow card) 2× (suspension)	Report	3× (yellow card) 3× (suspension)	Boris Trajkovski Sports Center, Skopje; Attendance: 2,680; Referees: Brkic, Jusufhodzic (AUT)

3 December 2015; 20:00	Kadetten Schaffhausen (Switzerland)	24–23	(Romania) HC Baia Mare	BBC-Arena, Schaffhausen; Attendance: 1,640; Referees: Pavićević, Ražnatović (MNE)
3 December 2015; 20:00	Küttel 9	(14–12)	Ostroushko 6	BBC-Arena, Schaffhausen; Attendance: 1,640; Referees: Pavićević, Ražnatović (MNE)
3 December 2015; 20:00	3× (yellow card) 4× (suspension)	Report	3× (yellow card) 6× (suspension)	BBC-Arena, Schaffhausen; Attendance: 1,640; Referees: Pavićević, Ražnatović (MNE)

6 December 2015; 15:15	Elverum Håndball (Norway)	29–23	(North Macedonia) Metalurg Skopje	Elverumshallen, Elverum; Attendance: 1,461; Referees: Opava, Válek (CZE)
6 December 2015; 15:15	Lindboe 8	(15–7)	Božović 5	Elverumshallen, Elverum; Attendance: 1,461; Referees: Opava, Válek (CZE)
6 December 2015; 15:15	3× (yellow card) 4× (suspension)	Report	2× (yellow card) 3× (suspension)	Elverumshallen, Elverum; Attendance: 1,461; Referees: Opava, Válek (CZE)

6 December 2015; 16:50	Skjern Håndbold (Denmark)	36–36	(Ukraine) Motor Zaporizhzhia	Skjern Bank Arena, Skjern; Attendance: 2,339; Referees: Gubica, Milošević (CRO)
6 December 2015; 16:50	Mikkelsen, Søndergaard 8	(17–19)	Pukhouski 8	Skjern Bank Arena, Skjern; Attendance: 2,339; Referees: Gubica, Milošević (CRO)
6 December 2015; 16:50	3× (yellow card) 1× (suspension)	Report	3× (yellow card) 4× (suspension)	Skjern Bank Arena, Skjern; Attendance: 2,339; Referees: Gubica, Milošević (CRO)

== Playoffs ==
The top two teams from Groups C and D contest a playoff to determine the two sides advancing to the knockout phase. The winners of each group will face the runners-up of the other group in a two-legged tie. The first leg will be played on 27–28 February 2016, and the second leg will be played on 5 March 2016.

Team 1	Agg.	Team 2	1st leg	2nd leg
Logroño (Spain)	67–70	(Ukraine) Motor Zaporizhzhia	30–31	37–39
Skjern Håndbold (Denmark)	54–58	(Belarus) Meshkov Brest	31–31	23–27

=== Matches ===
27 February 2016; 16:00	Logroño (Spain)	30–31	(Ukraine) Motor Zaporizhzhia	Palacio de los Deportes de La Rioja, Logroño; Attendance: 3,000; Referees: Dobrovits, Tájok (HUN)
27 February 2016; 16:00	Rocas 6	(15–14)	Pukhouski 10	Palacio de los Deportes de La Rioja, Logroño; Attendance: 3,000; Referees: Dobrovits, Tájok (HUN)
27 February 2016; 16:00	2× (yellow card) 2× (suspension)	Report	3× (yellow card) 4× (suspension)	Palacio de los Deportes de La Rioja, Logroño; Attendance: 3,000; Referees: Dobrovits, Tájok (HUN)

5 March 2016; 18:30	Motor Zaporizhzhia (Ukraine)	39–37	(Spain) Logroño	Palace of Sport, Brovary; Attendance: 2,800; Referees: Nikolov, Nachevski (MKD)
5 March 2016; 18:30	Pukhouski 10	(21–16)	Pedro Rodríguez 7	Palace of Sport, Brovary; Attendance: 2,800; Referees: Nikolov, Nachevski (MKD)
5 March 2016; 18:30	3× (yellow card) 8× (suspension) 1× (red card)	Report	3× (yellow card) 3× (red card)	Palace of Sport, Brovary; Attendance: 2,800; Referees: Nikolov, Nachevski (MKD)

Motor Zaporizhzhia won 70–67 on aggregate.

28 February 2016; 15:15	Skjern Håndbold (Denmark)	31–31	(Belarus) Meshkov Brest	Skjern Bank Arena, Skjern; Attendance: 2,432; Referees: Santos, Fonseca (POR)
28 February 2016; 15:15	Rasmussen 10	(17–14)	Stojković 8	Skjern Bank Arena, Skjern; Attendance: 2,432; Referees: Santos, Fonseca (POR)
28 February 2016; 15:15	3× (yellow card) 8× (suspension) 1× (red card)	Report	3× (yellow card) 9× (suspension)	Skjern Bank Arena, Skjern; Attendance: 2,432; Referees: Santos, Fonseca (POR)

5 March 2016; 19:00	Meshkov Brest (Belarus)	27–23	(Denmark) Skjern Håndbold	Universal Sports Complex Victoria, Brest; Attendance: 3,500; Referees: Jurinović, Mrvica (CRO)
5 March 2016; 19:00	Shylovich 6	(14–11)	Myrhol 5	Universal Sports Complex Victoria, Brest; Attendance: 3,500; Referees: Jurinović, Mrvica (CRO)
5 March 2016; 19:00	3× (yellow card) 1× (suspension) 1× (red card)	Report	3× (yellow card) 4× (suspension)	Universal Sports Complex Victoria, Brest; Attendance: 3,500; Referees: Jurinović, Mrvica (CRO)

Meshkov Brest won 58–54 on aggregate.
