= 2014–15 EHF Cup knockout stage =

This page describes the knockout stage of the 2014–15 EHF Cup.

== Quarterfinals ==
The draw will be held on 24 March 2015 at 10:45 in Vienna, Austria. The first legs are played on 11–12 April, and the second legs on 18–19 April 2014.

=== Ranking of the second-placed teams ===
The ranking of the second-placed teams is carried out on the basis of the team's results in the group stage. Because the German side Füchse Berlin, the organizers of the Final 4 tournament, finished on top of their group they qualified directly to the final tournament and only the top three second-placed teams qualified to the quarter-finals.

Group	Team	Pld	W	D	L	GF	GA	GD	Pts
C	(Denmark) Skjern Håndbold	6	5	0	1	164	147	+17	10
A	(Slovenia) RK Gorenje	6	4	0	2	192	160	+32	8
D	(Sweden) Eskilstuna Guif	6	3	2	1	165	156	+9	8
B	(Spain) Fraikin Granollers	6	3	1	2	159	154	+5	7

=== Seedings ===
Pot 1 (Germany) HSV Hamburg (Denmark) Team Tvis Holstebro (Germany) MT Melsungen	Pot 2 (Slovenia) RK Gorenje (Denmark) Skjern Håndbold (Sweden) Eskilstuna Guif

=== Matches ===
Team 1	Agg.	Team 2	1st leg	2nd leg
Eskilstuna Guif (Sweden)	51–53	(Germany) HSV Hamburg	29–26	22-27
Skjern Håndbold (Denmark)	48–48	(Germany) MT Melsungen	25–20	23-28
RK Gorenje (Slovenia)	59–57	(Denmark) Team Tvis Holstebro	28–27	31-30

==== First leg ====
11 April 2015; 15:00	Skjern Håndbold (Denmark)	25—20	(Germany) MT Melsungen	Skjern Bank Arena, Skjern; Attendance: 1,500; Referees: Erdogan, Özdeniz (TUR)
11 April 2015; 15:00	Mikkelsen 7	(12—12)	Danner 4	Skjern Bank Arena, Skjern; Attendance: 1,500; Referees: Erdogan, Özdeniz (TUR)
11 April 2015; 15:00	2× (yellow card) 5× (suspension)	Report	2× (yellow card) 5× (suspension)	Skjern Bank Arena, Skjern; Attendance: 1,500; Referees: Erdogan, Özdeniz (TUR)

11 April 2015; 16:00	Eskilstuna Guif (Sweden)	29—26	(Germany) HSV Hamburg	Eskilstuna Sporthall, Eskilstuna; Attendance: 1,551; Referees: Bounouara, Sami (FRA)
11 April 2015; 16:00	three players 5	(12—13)	Mahé 8	Eskilstuna Sporthall, Eskilstuna; Attendance: 1,551; Referees: Bounouara, Sami (FRA)
11 April 2015; 16:00	3× (yellow card) 4× (suspension)	Report	3× (yellow card) 5× (suspension)	Eskilstuna Sporthall, Eskilstuna; Attendance: 1,551; Referees: Bounouara, Sami (FRA)

11 April 2015; 20:30	RK Gorenje (Slovenia)	28—27	(Denmark) Team Tvis Holstebro	Rdeča dvorana, Velenje; Attendance: 1,230; Referees: Tzaferopoulos, Bethmann (GRE)
11 April 2015; 20:30	Sostaric 6	(13—14)	Bramming, Nielsen 5	Rdeča dvorana, Velenje; Attendance: 1,230; Referees: Tzaferopoulos, Bethmann (GRE)
11 April 2015; 20:30	2× (yellow card) 6× (suspension)	Report	3× (yellow card) 3× (suspension)	Rdeča dvorana, Velenje; Attendance: 1,230; Referees: Tzaferopoulos, Bethmann (GRE)

==== Second leg ====
19 April 2015; 13:00	Team Tvis Holstebro (Denmark)	30—31	(Slovenia) RK Gorenje	Idrætscenter Vest, Holstebro; Attendance: 1,114; Referees: Leszczynski, Piechota (POL)
19 April 2015; 13:00	Christensen 8	(16—18)	Skube 8	Idrætscenter Vest, Holstebro; Attendance: 1,114; Referees: Leszczynski, Piechota (POL)
19 April 2015; 13:00	3× (yellow card) 2× (suspension)	Report	2× (yellow card) 6× (suspension)	Idrætscenter Vest, Holstebro; Attendance: 1,114; Referees: Leszczynski, Piechota (POL)

19 April 2015; 16:30	MT Melsungen (Germany)	28—23	(Denmark) Skjern Håndbold	Rothenbach-Halle, Kassel; Attendance: 3,147; Referees: Konjicanin, Konjicanin (BIH)
19 April 2015; 16:30	Müller 9	(15—12)	three players 5	Rothenbach-Halle, Kassel; Attendance: 3,147; Referees: Konjicanin, Konjicanin (BIH)
19 April 2015; 16:30	3× (yellow card) 1× (suspension)	Report	3× (yellow card) 4× (suspension)	Rothenbach-Halle, Kassel; Attendance: 3,147; Referees: Konjicanin, Konjicanin (BIH)

19 April 2015; 17:00	HSV Hamburg (Germany)	27—22	(Sweden) Eskilstuna Guif	Alsterdorfer Sporthalle, Hamburg; Attendance: 2,253; Referees: Pandzic, Mosorinski (SRB)
19 April 2015; 17:00	Mahé, Pfahl 6	(13—11)	Pettersson 6	Alsterdorfer Sporthalle, Hamburg; Attendance: 2,253; Referees: Pandzic, Mosorinski (SRB)
19 April 2015; 17:00	3× (yellow card) 5× (suspension)	Report	3× (yellow card) 6× (suspension)	Alsterdorfer Sporthalle, Hamburg; Attendance: 2,253; Referees: Pandzic, Mosorinski (SRB)
