= Tiago Rocha (handballer) =

Portuguese handball player (born 1985)

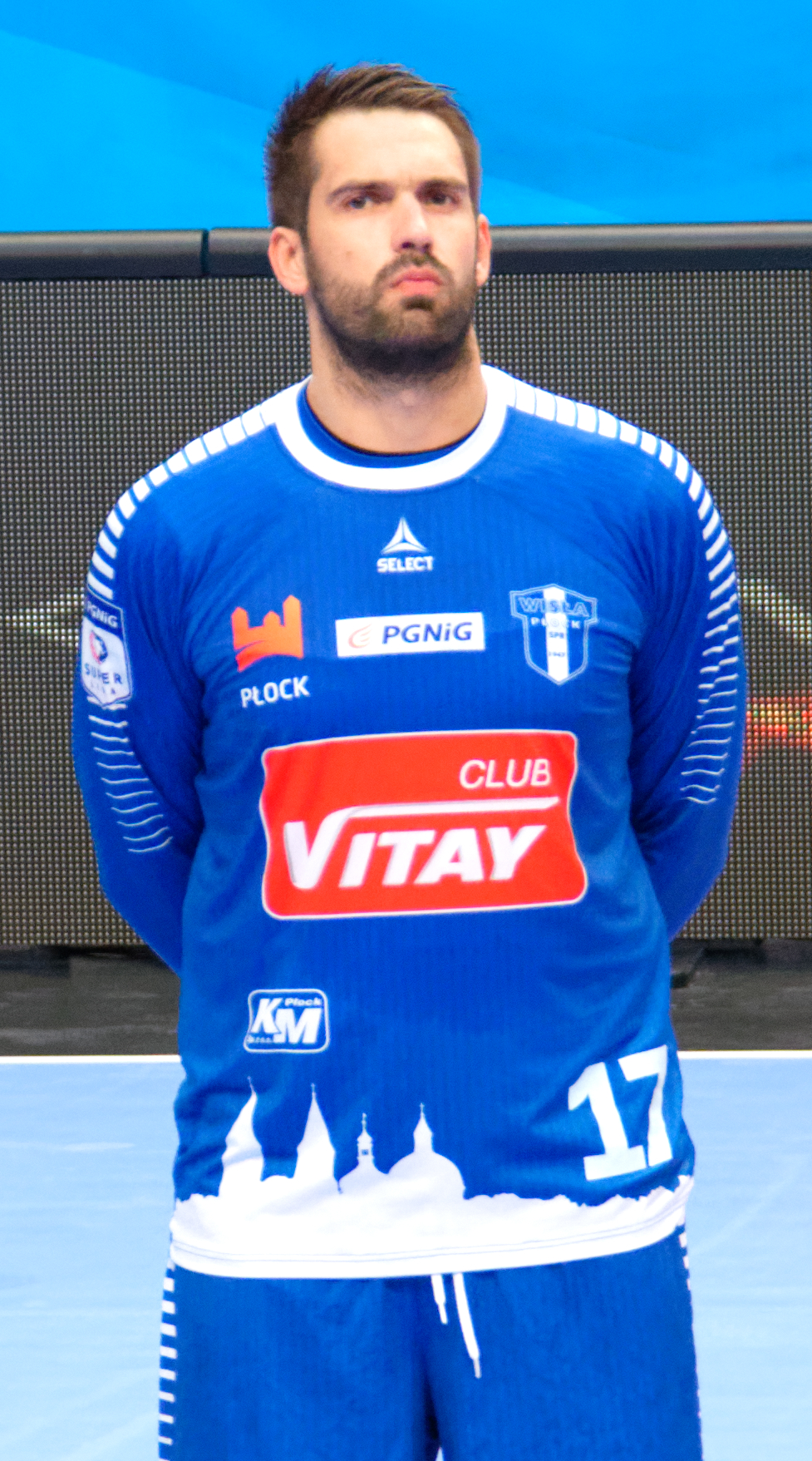

Personal information
- Nationality: Portuguese
- Born: 17 October 1985 (age 41) São Paio de Oleiros, Portugal
- Height: 1.96 m (6 ft 5 in)

Sport
- Sport: Handball
- Position: Pivot
- Current club: Cesson Rennes MHB
- Number: 17

Senior clubs
- Years: Team
- 2003–2014: FC Porto
- 2014–2017: Wisła Płock
- 2017–: Sporting CP
- 2021-2022: Nancy Handball
- 2022-: Cesson Rennes MHB
National team
Years	Team	Apps	(Gls)
–	Portugal	136	(355)
- Updated on 29 May 2024

Tiago Rocha (born 3 March 1985) is a Portuguese handball player for Sporting CP and the Portuguese national team.

He represented Portugal at the 2020 European Men's Handball Championship.
