= Filip Marjanović =

Serbian handball player (born 1989)

Personal information
- Nationality: Serbian
- Born: 10 February 1989 (age 37) Belgrade, Serbia, Yugoslavia
- Height: 1.89 m (6 ft 2 in)

Sport
- Sport: Handball
- Position: Left wing
- Current club: SCM Politehnica Timișoara
- Number: 17
National team
| Years | Team | Apps | (Gls) |
| – | Serbia | 23 | (17) |

Filip Marjanović (born 10 February 1989) is a Serbian handball player. He plays for the Romanian club SCM Politehnica Timișoara and the Serbian national team.

He competed at the 2016 European Men's Handball Championship.

== Individual awards ==
- Gala Premiilor Handbalului Românesc Liga Națională Left Wing of the Season: 2019
