= Dmitry Kovalyov (handballer) =

Russian handball player

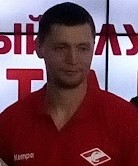

Personal information
- Nationality: Russian
- Born: 15 May 1982 (age 44) Omsk, RSFSR, USSR
- Height: 1.80 m (5 ft 11 in)

Sport
- Sport: Handball
- Position: Right wing
National team
| Years | Team | Apps | (Gls) |
| 2005–2020 | Russia | 214 | (552) |

Dmitry Sergeyevich Kovalyov (Russian: Дмитрий Сергеевич Ковалёв; born 15 May 1982) is a former Russian handball player known for Chekhovskiye Medvedi and the Russian national team.
