= Žiga Mlakar =

Slovenian handball player

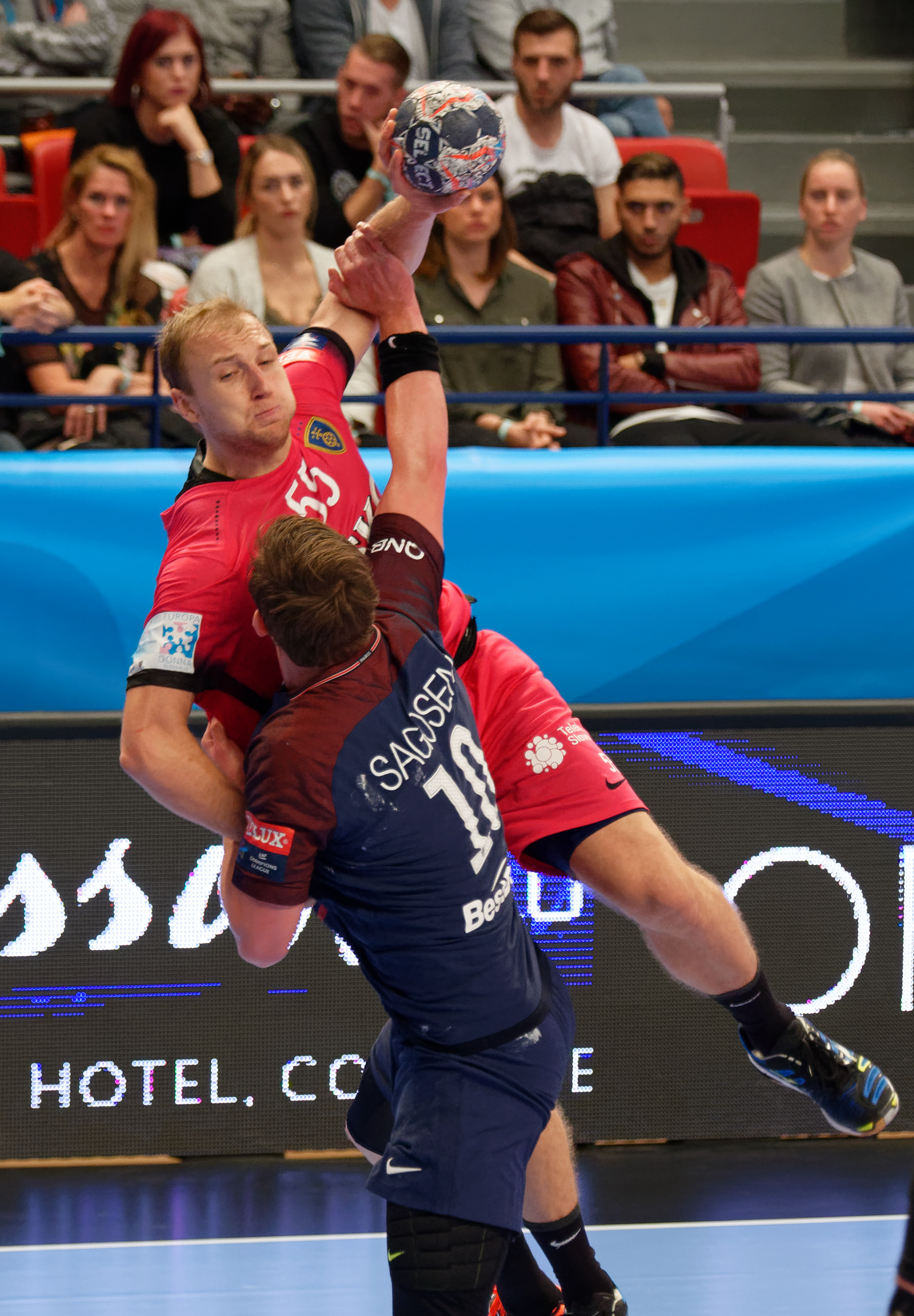

Personal information
- Nationality: Slovenian
- Born: 16 May 1990 (age 36) Celje, SFR Yugoslavia
- Height: 1.92 m (6 ft 4 in)

Sport
- Sport: Handball
- Position: Right back
- Current club: RK Celje
- Number: 55

Senior clubs
- Years: Team
- 2007–2014: RK Celje
- 2014–2015: RK Maribor Branik
- 2015–2018: RK Celje
- 2018–2020: Wisła Płock
- 2020: RK Zagreb
- 2020–: RK Celje
National team
Years	Team	Apps	(Gls)
2014–	Slovenia	26	(49)

Žiga Mlakar (born 16 May 1990) is a Slovenian handball player who plays for RK Celje and the Slovenian national team.

He represented Slovenia at the 2018 European Men's Handball Championship.
