= André Lindboe =

Norwegian handball player (born 1988)

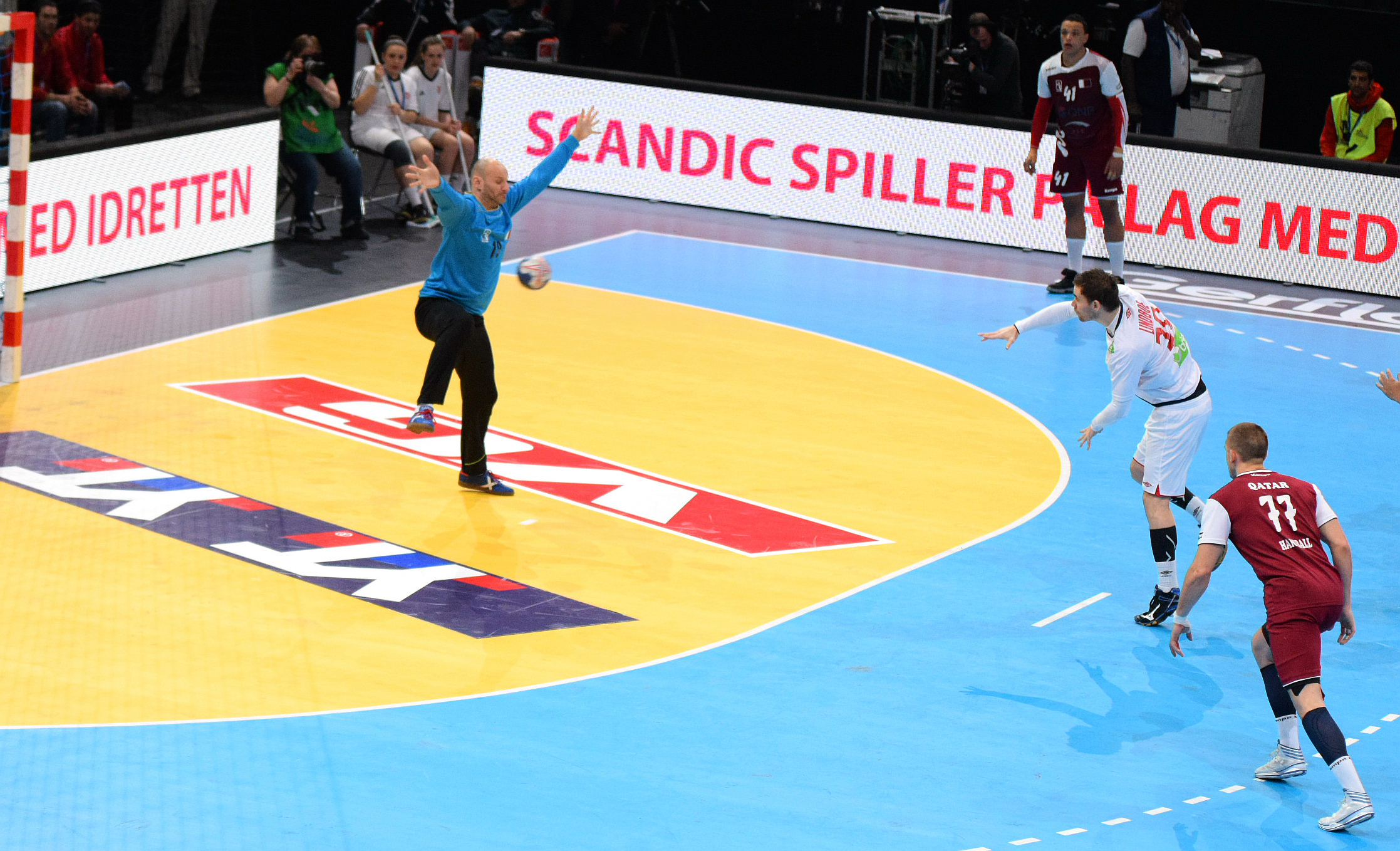
- Lindboe in 2017

Personal information
- Nationality: Norwegian
- Born: 3 November 1988 (age 37) Tønsberg, Norway
- Height: 1.78 m (5 ft 10 in)

Sport
- Sport: Handball
- Position: Left wing
- Current club: ØIF Arendal
- Number: 9

Senior clubs
- Years: Team
- 2009–2018: Elverum Håndball
- 2018–2020: ØIF Arendal
- 2020–2021: Tromsø HK
National team
Years	Team	Apps	(Gls)
2011–2017	Norway	59	(96)
Medal record
World Championship
Silver medal – second place	2017 France

André Lindboe (born 3 November 1988) is a Norwegian former handball player for Elverum Håndball and the Norwegian national team. He retired in 2020, but played at amateur levels in Tromsø.
