= Kasper Irming Andersen =

Danish handball player (born 1985)

Personal information
- Full name: Kasper Ryan Irming Andersen
- Nationality: Danish
- Born: 12 March 1985 (age 41) Skanderborg, Denmark
- Height: 1.88 m (6 ft 2 in)

Sport
- Sport: Handball
- Position: Right back/wing
- Current club: KIF Kolding
- Number: 7

Senior clubs
- Years: Team
- 2006-2011: Aarhus Håndbold
- 2011-2012: KIF Kolding
- 2012-2016: KIF Kolding København
- 2016-2018: Skanderborg Håndbold
- 2018-2019: KIF Kolding
National team
Years	Team	Apps	(Gls)
2006-2013	Denmark	15	(27)

Kasper Ryan Irming Andersen (born 12 March 1986 in Aarhus) is a Danish former handball player who played most of his career in KIF Kolding. He played several matches for the Danish national team. He retired in 2019.

Previously Irming has played for Skanderborg Håndbold, Voel KFUM, Ikast-Brande EH and Aarhus GF Håndbold.
