= Sergei Gorbok =

Belarusian-born Russian handball player

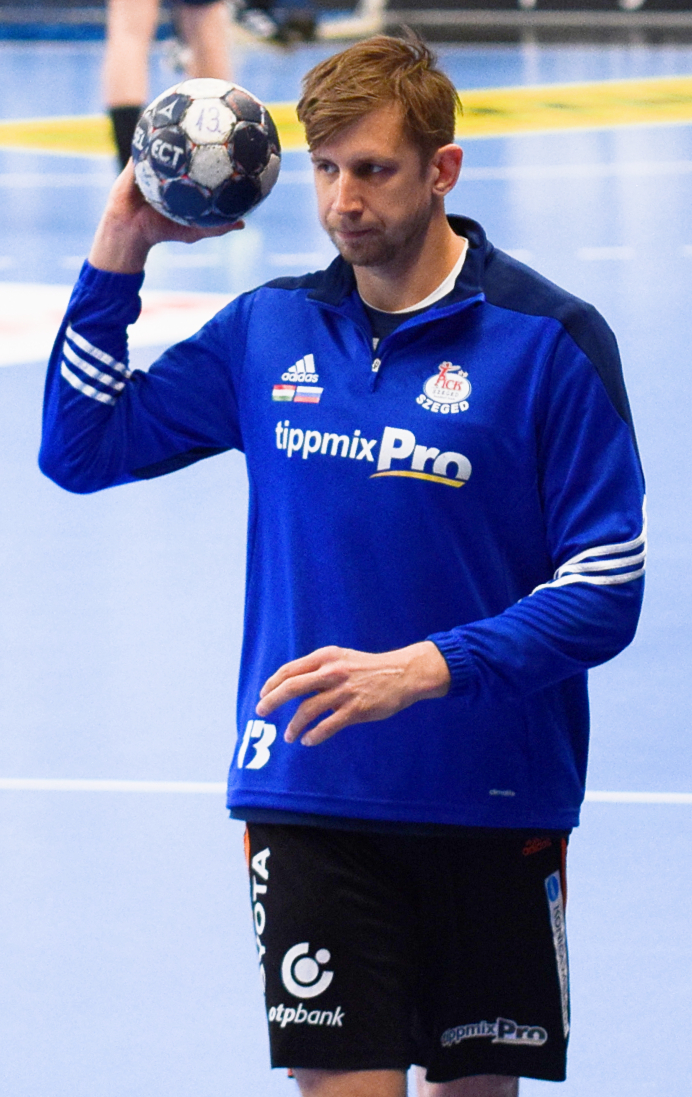

Personal information
- Nationality: Belarusian/Russian
- Born: 4 December 1982 (age 43) Minsk, Belarus
- Height: 1.95 m (6 ft 5 in)

Sport
- Sport: Handball
- Position: Left back

Senior clubs
- Years: Team
- 1999–2003: Arkatron Minsk
- 2003–2005: ZTR Zaporizhia
- 2005–2007: RK Celje
- 2007–2010: Rhein-Neckar Löwen
- 2010–2013: Chekhovskiye Medvedi
- 2013–2014: Rhein-Neckar Löwen
- 2014–2016: RK Vardar
- 2016–2018: SC Pick Szeged
- 2018–2020: RK Vardar
National team
Years	Team	Apps	(Gls)
2001–2009	Belarus	42	(193)
2012–2020	Russia	85	(243)

Teams managed
- 2022–2023: Viktor Stavropol

Sergei Valeryevich Gorbok (Russian: Сергей Валерьевич Горбок; born 4 December 1982) is a retired Belarusian-born Russian handball player.
