= Lasse Mikkelsen =

Danish footballer (born 1998)

Personal information
- Full name: Lasse Askou Mikkelsen
- Date of birth: 18 January 1998 (age 28)
- Place of birth: Denmark
- Height: 1.86 m (6 ft 1 in)
- Position: Goalkeeper

Youth career
- Brørup GF
- Vejen SF
- –2014: Esbjerg fB
- 2014–2016: PSV

Senior career*
Years	Team	Apps	(Gls)
2015–2016	Jong PSV	0	(0)
2017–2019	Esbjerg fB	1	(0)
2018	→ Kolding IF (loan)	3	(0)
2019	Næstved BK	5	(0)
- * Club domestic league appearances and goals as of 15:41, 29 November 2019 (UTC)

Lasse Askou Mikkelsen (born 18 January 1998) is a Danish footballer who plays as a goalkeeper.

== Career ==
In May 2014, Esbjerg fB announced that they had sold Mikkelsen to Dutch club PSV Eindhoven. Two years later, he returned to Esbjerg fB.

In June 2019, Mikkelsen joined Næstved BK in the Danish 1st Division. He started as the first choice and played the first five league games, before getting injured. Næstved then signed Mikkel Bruhn on loan as a replacement, but after Mikkelsen returned from the injury, he became the second choice. Therefore, the parties decided to terminated Mikkelsen's contract by mutual agreement on 29 November 2019.
