= Skjern Bank Arena =

Danish indoor sports arena

Coordinates: 55°57′11″N 8°30′04″E

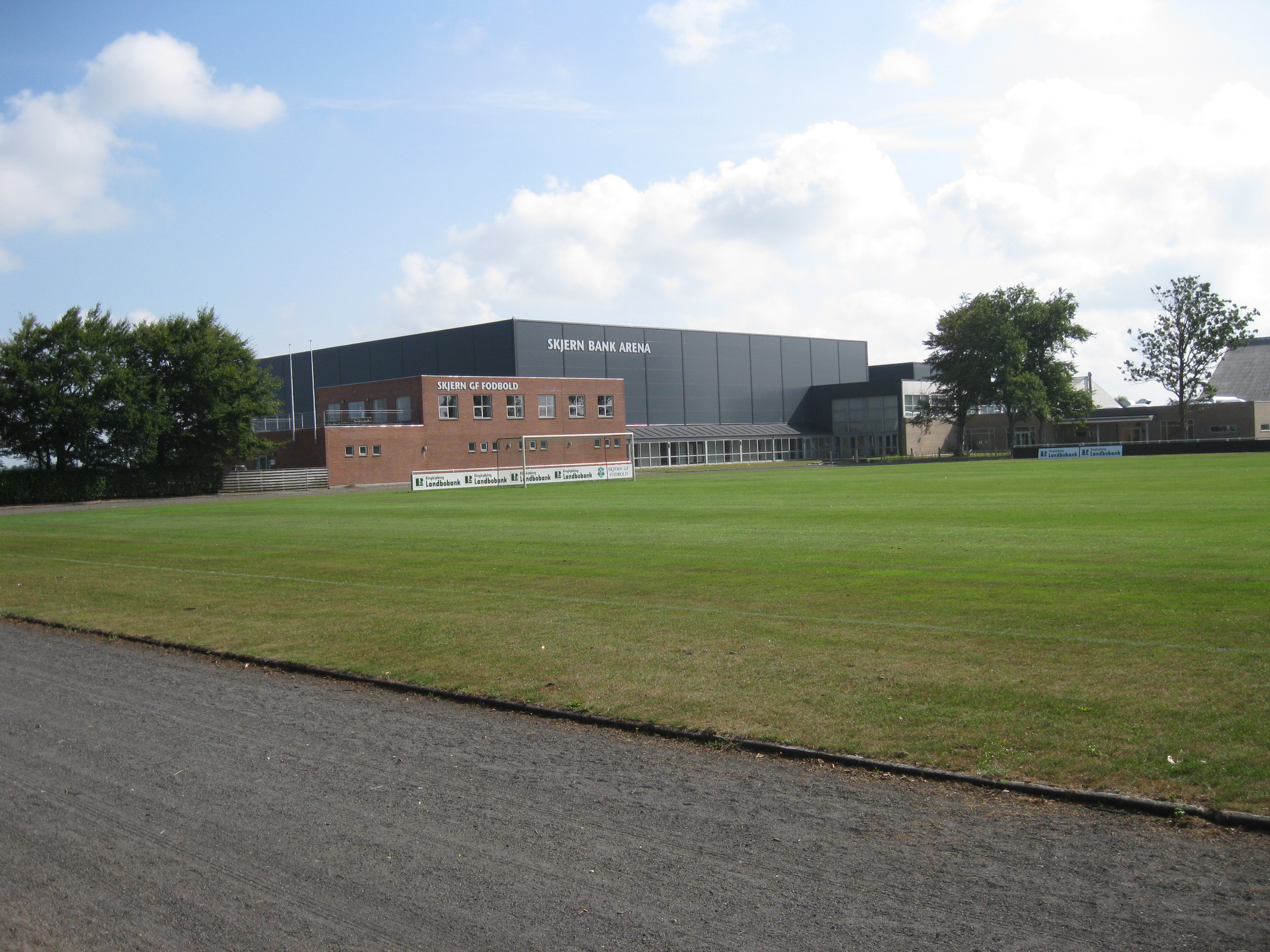
- Interactive map of Skjern Bank Arena
- Full name: Skjern Bank Arena
- Location: Ranunkelvej 1, DK-6900, Skjern, Denmark
- Owner: Ringkøbing-Skjern Municipality
- Capacity: 3,100 (2,400 seats)

Construction
- Expanded: 2015

Tenant
- Skjern Håndbold

Skjern Bank Arena is an indoor sports arena in Skjern, Denmark primarily used for handball. It is located in the local center Ringkøbing-Skjern Kulturcenter. The arena can seat 2,400 spectators and is home to Danish Handball League team Skjern Håndbold. The Skjern Bank Arena often hosts handball games for the home team Skjern Håndbold and other sports related events.
