= 2016 European Men's Handball Championship =

2016 edition of the European Men's Handball Championship

2016 EHF European Men's Handball Championship
Mistrzostwa Europy w Piłce Ręcznej Mężczyzn 2016

Tournament details
- Host country: Poland
- Venues: 4 (in 5 host cities)
- Dates: 15–31 January
- Teams: 16 (from 1 confederation)

Final positions
- Champions: Germany (2nd title)
- Runners-up: Spain
- Third place: Croatia
- Fourth place: Norway

Tournament statistics
- Matches played: 48
- Goals scored: 2,629 (54.77 per match)
- Attendance: 400,815 (8,350 per match)
- Top scorers: (Spain) Valero Rivera Folch (48 goals)

Awards
- Best player: (Spain) Raúl Entrerríos

The 2016 EHF European Men's Handball Championship was the twelfth edition and was held for the first time in Poland from 15–31 January 2016. Croatia and Norway were the other applicants in the bidding process.

Poland was awarded the championship on the EHF Congress in Monaco on 23 June 2012 with 58% votes.

Germany won their second title by beating Spain 24–17 in the final. Croatia captured the bronze medal after defeating Norway 31–24.

== Bidding process ==
The Bids were as follows:

- Croatia
- Norway
- Poland

Poland would win the hosting rights, gaining the most votes of the three.

Voting results
Country
Country	Votes
Poland	27
Croatia	15
Norway	4
Total	46

== Venues ==
Kraków	Gdańsk / Sopot	2016 European Men's Handball Championship is located in Poland
Tauron Arena; Capacity: 15,328	Ergo Arena; Capacity: 11,409	2016 European Men's Handball Championship is located in Poland
Katowice	Wrocław	2016 European Men's Handball Championship is located in Poland
Spodek; Capacity: 11,036	Centennial Hall; Capacity: 8,500	2016 European Men's Handball Championship is located in Poland

== Qualification ==
=== Qualified teams ===
Country	Qualified as	Qualified on	Previous appearances in tournament
Poland	Host	23 June 2012	7 (2002, 2004, 2006, 2008, 2010, 2012, 2014)
Hungary	Group 5 winner	2 May 2015	9 (1994, 1996, 1998, 2004, 2006, 2008, 2010, 2012, 2014)
Denmark	Group 2 winner	2 May 2015	10 (1994, 1996, 2000, 2002, 2004, 2006, **2008**, 2010, **2012**, 2014)
France	Group 6 winner	3 May 2015	11 (1994, 1996, 1998, 2000, 2002, 2004, **2006**, 2008, **2010**, 2012, **2014**)
Sweden	Group 3 winner	10 June 2015	10 (**1994**, 1996, **1998**, **2000**, **2002**, 2004, 2008, 2010, 2012, 2014)
Slovenia	Group 3 runner-up	10 June 2015	9 (1994, 1996, 2000, 2002, 2004, 2006, 2008, 2010, 2012)
Croatia	Group 1 winner	10 June 2015	11 (1994, 1996, 1998, 2000, 2002, 2004, 2006, 2008, 2010, 2012, 2014)
Norway	Group 1 runner-up	10 June 2015	6 (2000, 2006, 2008, 2010, 2012, 2014)
Spain	Group 7 winner	10 June 2015	11 (1994, 1996, 1998, 2000, 2002, 2004, 2006, 2008, 2010, 2012, 2014)
Germany	Group 7 runner-up	10 June 2015	10 (1994, 1996, 1998, 2000, 2002, **2004**, 2006, 2008, 2010, 2012)
Iceland	Group 4 winner	14 June 2015	8 (2000, 2002, 2004, 2006, 2008, 2010, 2012, 2014)
Serbia	Group 4 runner-up	14 June 2015	3 ( 2010, 2012, 2014)
Montenegro	Best third placed team	14 June 2015	2 (2008, 2014)
Russia	Group 5 runner-up	14 June 2015	11 (1994, **1996**, 1998, 2000, 2002, 2004, 2006, 2008, 2010, 2012, 2014)
Macedonia	Group 6 runner-up	14 June 2015	3 (1998, 2012, 2014)
Belarus	Group 2 runner-up	14 June 2015	3 (1994, 2008, 2014)

Note: Bold indicates champion for that year. Italic indicates host for that year.

== Seeding ==
The seeding was announced on 18 June 2015.

Pot 1	Pot 2	Pot 3	Pot 4
France; Denmark (assigned to D1); Spain; Croatia (assigned to B1)	Iceland; Poland (assigned to A2); Sweden; Hungary	Russia; Macedonia; Germany (assigned to C3); Belarus	Serbia; Norway; Slovenia; Montenegro

== Match officials ==
On 30 September 2015, 12 couples were announced.

Country	Referees
Belarus	Andrei Gousko; Siarhei Repkin
Croatia	Matija Gubica; Boris Milošević
Czech Republic	Václav Horáček; Jiří Novotný
Denmark	Martin Gjeding; Mads Hansen
France	Stevann Pichon; Laurent Reveret
Germany	Lars Geipel; Marcus Helbig

Country	Referees
Latvia	Zigmārs Stoļarovs; Renārs Līcis
Macedonia	Gjorgi Nachevski; Slave Nikolov
Portugal	Duarte Santos; Ricardo Fonseca
Romania	Bogdan Stark; Romeo Ştefan
Spain	Óscar Raluy; Ángel Sabroso
Sweden	Michael Johansson; Jasmin Kliko

== Group stage ==
The draw was held on 19 June 2015.

All times are local (UTC+1).

=== Group A ===
Pos	Team	Pld	W	D	L	GF	GA	GD	Pts	Qualification
1	Poland (H)	3	3	0	0	84	76	+8	6	Advance to main round
2	France	3	2	0	1	91	80	+11	4	Advance to main round
3	Macedonia	3	0	1	2	73	81	−8	1 (Note: Macedonia 27–27 Serbia)	Advance to main round
4	Serbia	3	0	1	2	81	92	−11	1	Eliminated

Source: EHF-Euro
Rules for classification: 1) Points; 2) Head-to-head points; 3) Head-to-head goal difference; 4) Head-to-head goals scored; 5) Goal difference; 6) Goals scored; 7) Draw.
(H) Hosts
Notes:

15 January 2016; 18:00	France	30–23	Macedonia	Tauron Arena, Kraków; Attendance: 9,000; Referees: Gjeding, Hansen (DEN)
15 January 2016; 18:00	Sorhaindo 6	(12–12)	K. Lazarov 9	Tauron Arena, Kraków; Attendance: 9,000; Referees: Gjeding, Hansen (DEN)
15 January 2016; 18:00	2× (yellow card) 6× (suspension) 1× (red card)	Report	3× (yellow card) 7× (suspension)	Tauron Arena, Kraków; Attendance: 9,000; Referees: Gjeding, Hansen (DEN)

15 January 2016; 20:30	Poland	29–28	Serbia	Tauron Arena, Kraków; Attendance: 14,100; Referees: Stark, Ştefan (ROU)
15 January 2016; 20:30	Jurecki 7	(14–15)	Nenadić, Nikčević 7	Tauron Arena, Kraków; Attendance: 14,100; Referees: Stark, Ştefan (ROU)
15 January 2016; 20:30	4× (yellow card) 3× (suspension)	Report	4× (yellow card) 6× (suspension) 1× (red card)	Tauron Arena, Kraków; Attendance: 14,100; Referees: Stark, Ştefan (ROU)

17 January 2016; 18:15	Serbia	26–36	France	Tauron Arena, Kraków; Attendance: 10,900; Referees: Johansson, Kliko (SWE)
17 January 2016; 18:15	Šešum 7	(16–19)	Nyokas 8	Tauron Arena, Kraków; Attendance: 10,900; Referees: Johansson, Kliko (SWE)
17 January 2016; 18:15	3× (yellow card) 7× (suspension)	Report	2× (yellow card) 2× (suspension)	Tauron Arena, Kraków; Attendance: 10,900; Referees: Johansson, Kliko (SWE)

17 January 2016; 20:30	Macedonia	23–24	Poland	Tauron Arena, Kraków; Attendance: 14,200; Referees: Geipel, Helbig (GER)
17 January 2016; 20:30	K. Lazarov 8	(13–11)	Syprzak 6	Tauron Arena, Kraków; Attendance: 14,200; Referees: Geipel, Helbig (GER)
17 January 2016; 20:30	4× (yellow card) 4× (suspension)	Report	1× (yellow card) 5× (suspension) 1× (red card)	Tauron Arena, Kraków; Attendance: 14,200; Referees: Geipel, Helbig (GER)

19 January 2016; 18:15	Macedonia	27–27	Serbia	Tauron Arena, Kraków; Attendance: 11,000; Referees: Horáček, Novotný (CZE)
19 January 2016; 18:15	Manaskov 10	(13–13)	Nenadić, Šešum 7	Tauron Arena, Kraków; Attendance: 11,000; Referees: Horáček, Novotný (CZE)
19 January 2016; 18:15	4× (yellow card) 1× (suspension)	Report	3× (yellow card) 6× (suspension)	Tauron Arena, Kraków; Attendance: 11,000; Referees: Horáček, Novotný (CZE)

19 January 2016; 20:30	France	25–31	Poland	Tauron Arena, Kraków; Attendance: 14,854; Referees: López, Ramírez (ESP)
19 January 2016; 20:30	Abalo, Mahé 5	(12–15)	Bielecki 9	Tauron Arena, Kraków; Attendance: 14,854; Referees: López, Ramírez (ESP)
19 January 2016; 20:30	2× (yellow card) 3× (suspension)	Report	4× (yellow card) 6× (suspension)	Tauron Arena, Kraków; Attendance: 14,854; Referees: López, Ramírez (ESP)

=== Group B ===
Pos	Team	Pld	W	D	L	GF	GA	GD	Pts	Qualification
1	Norway	3	2	0	1	88	84	+4	4 (Note: Norway 34–31 Croatia)	Advance to main round
2	Croatia	3	2	0	1	95	83	+12	4	Advance to main round
3	Belarus	3	1	0	2	87	94	−7	2 (Note: Belarus 39–38 Iceland)	Advance to main round
4	Iceland	3	1	0	2	92	101	−9	2	Eliminated

Source: EHF-Euro
Rules for classification: 1) Points; 2) Head-to-head points; 3) Head-to-head goal difference; 4) Head-to-head goals scored; 5) Goal difference; 6) Goals scored; 7) Draw.
Notes:

15 January 2016; 16:00	Croatia	27–21	Belarus	Spodek, Katowice; Attendance: 5,000; Referees: Johansson, Kliko (SWE)
15 January 2016; 16:00	Štrlek 9	(15–15)	Rutenka 8	Spodek, Katowice; Attendance: 5,000; Referees: Johansson, Kliko (SWE)
15 January 2016; 16:00	4× (yellow card) 6× (suspension) 1× (red card)	Report	3× (yellow card) 5× (suspension) 1× (red card)	Spodek, Katowice; Attendance: 5,000; Referees: Johansson, Kliko (SWE)

15 January 2016; 18:15	Iceland	26–25	Norway	Spodek, Katowice; Attendance: 6,200; Referees: Geipel, Helbig (GER)
15 January 2016; 18:15	Pálmarsson 8	(10–11)	Bjørnsen 7	Spodek, Katowice; Attendance: 6,200; Referees: Geipel, Helbig (GER)
15 January 2016; 18:15	4× (yellow card) 7× (suspension)	Report	4× (yellow card) 4× (suspension)	Spodek, Katowice; Attendance: 6,200; Referees: Geipel, Helbig (GER)

17 January 2016; 16:00	Belarus	39–38	Iceland	Spodek, Katowice; Attendance: 6,200; Referees: Horáček, Novotný (CZE)
17 January 2016; 16:00	Pukhouski 11	(17–18)	Petersson 6	Spodek, Katowice; Attendance: 6,200; Referees: Horáček, Novotný (CZE)
17 January 2016; 16:00	3× (yellow card) 6× (suspension)	Report	2× (yellow card) 5× (suspension)	Spodek, Katowice; Attendance: 6,200; Referees: Horáček, Novotný (CZE)

17 January 2016; 18:15	Norway	34–31	Croatia	Spodek, Katowice; Attendance: 8,400; Referees: López, Ramírez (ESP)
17 January 2016; 18:15	Bjørnsen 7	(16–17)	Duvnjak 8	Spodek, Katowice; Attendance: 8,400; Referees: López, Ramírez (ESP)
17 January 2016; 18:15	2× (yellow card) 4× (suspension)	Report	4× (yellow card) 6× (suspension)	Spodek, Katowice; Attendance: 8,400; Referees: López, Ramírez (ESP)

19 January 2016; 18:15	Belarus	27–29	Norway	Spodek, Katowice; Attendance: 6,800; Referees: Gjeding, Hansen (DEN)
19 January 2016; 18:15	Rutenka 9	(13–12)	Bjørnsen, O'Sullivan 5	Spodek, Katowice; Attendance: 6,800; Referees: Gjeding, Hansen (DEN)
19 January 2016; 18:15	4× (yellow card) 6× (suspension)	Report	3× (yellow card) 6× (suspension)	Spodek, Katowice; Attendance: 6,800; Referees: Gjeding, Hansen (DEN)

19 January 2016; 20:30	Croatia	37–28	Iceland	Spodek, Katowice; Attendance: 7,000; Referees: Stark, Ştefan (ROU)
19 January 2016; 20:30	Marić 8	(19–10)	Gunnarsson, Sigurðsson 6	Spodek, Katowice; Attendance: 7,000; Referees: Stark, Ştefan (ROU)
19 January 2016; 20:30	4× (yellow card) 5× (suspension)	Report	3× (yellow card) 4× (suspension)	Spodek, Katowice; Attendance: 7,000; Referees: Stark, Ştefan (ROU)

=== Group C ===
Pos	Team	Pld	W	D	L	GF	GA	GD	Pts	Qualification
1	Spain	3	2	1	0	80	75	+5	5	Advance to main round
2	Germany	3	2	0	1	81	79	+2	4	Advance to main round
3	Sweden	3	1	0	2	71	72	−1	2	Advance to main round
4	Slovenia	3	0	1	2	66	72	−6	1	Eliminated

Source: EHF-Euro
Rules for classification: 1) Points; 2) Head-to-head points; 3) Head-to-head goal difference; 4) Head-to-head goals scored; 5) Goal difference; 6) Goals scored; 7) Draw.

16 January 2016; 18:30	Spain	32–29	Germany	Hala Stulecia, Wrocław; Attendance: 6,500; Referees: Pichon, Reveret (FRA)
16 January 2016; 18:30	Rivera 7	(18–15)	Dissinger 6	Hala Stulecia, Wrocław; Attendance: 6,500; Referees: Pichon, Reveret (FRA)
16 January 2016; 18:30	3× (yellow card) 5× (suspension) 1× (red card)	Report	3× (yellow card) 7× (suspension)	Hala Stulecia, Wrocław; Attendance: 6,500; Referees: Pichon, Reveret (FRA)

16 January 2016; 20:45	Sweden	23–21	Slovenia	Hala Stulecia, Wrocław; Attendance: 6,500; Referees: Stoļarovs, Līcis (LAT)
16 January 2016; 20:45	Ekberg 4	(16–9)	Gaber 5	Hala Stulecia, Wrocław; Attendance: 6,500; Referees: Stoļarovs, Līcis (LAT)
16 January 2016; 20:45	2× (yellow card) 6× (suspension) 1× (red card)	Report	2× (yellow card) 5× (suspension)	Hala Stulecia, Wrocław; Attendance: 6,500; Referees: Stoļarovs, Līcis (LAT)

18 January 2016; 18:15	Slovenia	24–24	Spain	Hala Stulecia, Wrocław; Attendance: 6,000; Referees: Gousko, Repkin (BLR)
18 January 2016; 18:15	Žvižej 6	(13–10)	Aguinagalde 6	Hala Stulecia, Wrocław; Attendance: 6,000; Referees: Gousko, Repkin (BLR)
18 January 2016; 18:15	4× (yellow card) 3× (suspension) 1× (red card)	Report	3× (yellow card) 4× (suspension) 1× (red card)	Hala Stulecia, Wrocław; Attendance: 6,000; Referees: Gousko, Repkin (BLR)

18 January 2016; 20:30	Germany	27–26	Sweden	Hala Stulecia, Wrocław; Attendance: 6,500; Referees: Gubica, Milošević (CRO)
18 January 2016; 20:30	Reichmann 9	(13–17)	Jakobsson 8	Hala Stulecia, Wrocław; Attendance: 6,500; Referees: Gubica, Milošević (CRO)
18 January 2016; 20:30	4× (yellow card) 5× (suspension) 1× (red card)	Report	3× (yellow card) 3× (suspension)	Hala Stulecia, Wrocław; Attendance: 6,500; Referees: Gubica, Milošević (CRO)

20 January 2016; 17:15	Germany	25–21	Slovenia	Hala Stulecia, Wrocław; Attendance: 6,500; Referees: Santos, Fonseca (POR)
20 January 2016; 17:15	Reichmann 5	(12–10)	Kavtičnik 6	Hala Stulecia, Wrocław; Attendance: 6,500; Referees: Santos, Fonseca (POR)
20 January 2016; 17:15	2× (yellow card) 7× (suspension) 1× (red card)	Report	2× (yellow card) 7× (suspension) 1× (red card)	Hala Stulecia, Wrocław; Attendance: 6,500; Referees: Santos, Fonseca (POR)

20 January 2016; 20:00	Spain	24–22	Sweden	Hala Stulecia, Wrocław; Attendance: 6,200; Referees: Nachevski, Nikolov (MKD)
20 January 2016; 20:00	Rivera 9	(12–10)	Jakobsson, Östlund 4	Hala Stulecia, Wrocław; Attendance: 6,200; Referees: Nachevski, Nikolov (MKD)
20 January 2016; 20:00	3× (yellow card) 2× (suspension)	Report	2× (yellow card) 4× (suspension)	Hala Stulecia, Wrocław; Attendance: 6,200; Referees: Nachevski, Nikolov (MKD)

=== Group D ===
Pos	Team	Pld	W	D	L	GF	GA	GD	Pts	Qualification
1	Denmark	3	3	0	0	91	75	+16	6	Advance to main round
2	Russia	3	2	0	1	80	78	+2	4	Advance to main round
3	Hungary	3	1	0	2	80	84	−4	2	Advance to main round
4	Montenegro	3	0	0	3	76	90	−14	0	Eliminated

Source: EHF-Euro
Rules for classification: 1) Points; 2) Head-to-head points; 3) Head-to-head goal difference; 4) Head-to-head goals scored; 5) Goal difference; 6) Goals scored; 7) Draw.

16 January 2016; 18:00	Hungary	32–27	Montenegro	Ergo Arena, Gdańsk / Sopot; Attendance: 6,864; Referees: Gousko, Repkin (BLR)
16 January 2016; 18:00	Bánhidi 7	(16–12)	Borozan 7	Ergo Arena, Gdańsk / Sopot; Attendance: 6,864; Referees: Gousko, Repkin (BLR)
16 January 2016; 18:00	3× (yellow card) 5× (suspension)	Report	2× (yellow card) 4× (suspension)	Ergo Arena, Gdańsk / Sopot; Attendance: 6,864; Referees: Gousko, Repkin (BLR)

16 January 2016; 20:15	Denmark	31–25	Russia	Ergo Arena, Gdańsk / Sopot; Attendance: 7,952; Referees: Gubica, Milošević (CRO)
16 January 2016; 20:15	three players 4	(13–13)	Shelmenko 5	Ergo Arena, Gdańsk / Sopot; Attendance: 7,952; Referees: Gubica, Milošević (CRO)
16 January 2016; 20:15	3× (yellow card) 2× (suspension)	Report	2× (yellow card) 3× (suspension)	Ergo Arena, Gdańsk / Sopot; Attendance: 7,952; Referees: Gubica, Milošević (CRO)

18 January 2016; 18:00	Russia	27–26	Hungary	Ergo Arena, Gdańsk / Sopot; Attendance: 6,452; Referees: Nachevski, Nikolov (MKD)
18 January 2016; 18:00	Dibirov 6	(14–10)	Jamali 6	Ergo Arena, Gdańsk / Sopot; Attendance: 6,452; Referees: Nachevski, Nikolov (MKD)
18 January 2016; 18:00	4× (yellow card) 6× (suspension)	Report	3× (yellow card) 3× (suspension)	Ergo Arena, Gdańsk / Sopot; Attendance: 6,452; Referees: Nachevski, Nikolov (MKD)

18 January 2016; 20:15	Montenegro	28–30	Denmark	Ergo Arena, Gdańsk / Sopot; Attendance: 6,980; Referees: Santos, Fonseca (POR)
18 January 2016; 20:15	Grbović 7	(16–14)	Eggert 6	Ergo Arena, Gdańsk / Sopot; Attendance: 6,980; Referees: Santos, Fonseca (POR)
18 January 2016; 20:15	2× (yellow card) 3× (suspension)	Report	3× (yellow card) 3× (suspension)	Ergo Arena, Gdańsk / Sopot; Attendance: 6,980; Referees: Santos, Fonseca (POR)

20 January 2016; 17:15	Russia	28–21	Montenegro	Ergo Arena, Gdańsk / Sopot; Attendance: 5,930; Referees: Stoļarovs, Līcis (LAT)
20 January 2016; 17:15	Gorbok, Shelmenko 5	(14–9)	Ševaljević, Vujović 4	Ergo Arena, Gdańsk / Sopot; Attendance: 5,930; Referees: Stoļarovs, Līcis (LAT)
20 January 2016; 17:15	2× (yellow card) 3× (suspension)	Report	3× (yellow card) 5× (suspension)	Ergo Arena, Gdańsk / Sopot; Attendance: 5,930; Referees: Stoļarovs, Līcis (LAT)

20 January 2016; 20:00	Denmark	30–22	Hungary	Ergo Arena, Gdańsk / Sopot; Attendance: 8,361; Referees: Pichon, Reveret (FRA)
20 January 2016; 20:00	Hansen 9	(18–10)	Hornyák 5	Ergo Arena, Gdańsk / Sopot; Attendance: 8,361; Referees: Pichon, Reveret (FRA)
20 January 2016; 20:00	3× (yellow card) 1× (suspension)	Report	3× (yellow card) 2× (suspension)	Ergo Arena, Gdańsk / Sopot; Attendance: 8,361; Referees: Pichon, Reveret (FRA)

== Main round ==
The points gained in the preliminary group against teams that advanced were carried over.

=== Group I ===
Pos	Team	Pld	W	D	L	GF	GA	GD	Pts	Qualification
1	Norway	5	4	1	0	153	141	+12	9	Advanced to semifinals
2	Croatia	5	3	0	2	153	134	+19	6 (Note: Croatia 2 pts, +6 GD, France 2 pts, +2 GD, Poland 2 pts, −8 GD)	Advanced to semifinals
3	France	5	3	0	2	145	130	+15	6	Advanced to fifth place game
4	Poland	5	3	0	2	138	142	−4	6	Advanced to seventh place game
5	Belarus	5	1	0	4	128	151	−23	2	Eliminated
6	Macedonia	5	0	1	4	130	149	−19	1	Eliminated

Source: EHF-Euro
Rules for classification: 1) Points; 2) Head-to-head points; 3) Head-to-head goal difference; 4) Head-to-head goals scored; 5) Goal difference; 6) Goals scored; 7) Draw.
Notes:

21 January 2016; 18:15	France	34–23	Belarus	Tauron Arena, Kraków; Attendance: 6,900; Referees: Johansson, Kliko (SWE)
21 January 2016; 18:15	Karabatić 9	(20–5)	Khadkevich 9	Tauron Arena, Kraków; Attendance: 6,900; Referees: Johansson, Kliko (SWE)
21 January 2016; 18:15	3× (yellow card) 3× (suspension)	Report	3× (yellow card) 2× (suspension)	Tauron Arena, Kraków; Attendance: 6,900; Referees: Johansson, Kliko (SWE)

21 January 2016; 20:30	Macedonia	24–34	Croatia	Tauron Arena, Kraków; Attendance: 9,100; Referees: Geipel, Helbig (GER)
21 January 2016; 20:30	Manaskov 7	(13–17)	Slišković 6	Tauron Arena, Kraków; Attendance: 9,100; Referees: Geipel, Helbig (GER)
21 January 2016; 20:30	3× (yellow card) 1× (suspension)	Report	3× (yellow card) 2× (suspension)	Tauron Arena, Kraków; Attendance: 9,100; Referees: Geipel, Helbig (GER)

23 January 2016; 18:15	France	32–24	Croatia	Tauron Arena, Kraków; Attendance: 10,600; Referees: Horáček, Novotný (CZE)
23 January 2016; 18:15	Abalo 6	(16–10)	Duvnjak 5	Tauron Arena, Kraków; Attendance: 10,600; Referees: Horáček, Novotný (CZE)
23 January 2016; 18:15	2× (yellow card) 3× (suspension)	Report	3× (yellow card) 5× (suspension) 1× (red card)	Tauron Arena, Kraków; Attendance: 10,600; Referees: Horáček, Novotný (CZE)

23 January 2016; 20:30	Poland	28–30	Norway	Tauron Arena, Kraków; Attendance: 14,600; Referees: López, Ramírez (ESP)
23 January 2016; 20:30	Bielecki 10	(15–16)	Hansen 8	Tauron Arena, Kraków; Attendance: 14,600; Referees: López, Ramírez (ESP)
23 January 2016; 20:30	2× (yellow card) 4× (suspension)	Report	3× (yellow card) 5× (suspension)	Tauron Arena, Kraków; Attendance: 14,600; Referees: López, Ramírez (ESP)

25 January 2016; 18:15	Macedonia	31–31	Norway	Tauron Arena, Kraków; Attendance: 7,600; Referees: Stark, Ştefan (ROU)
25 January 2016; 18:15	K. Lazarov 11	(17–13)	Bjørnsen 6	Tauron Arena, Kraków; Attendance: 7,600; Referees: Stark, Ştefan (ROU)
25 January 2016; 18:15	3× (yellow card) 4× (suspension)	Report	4× (yellow card) 5× (suspension)	Tauron Arena, Kraków; Attendance: 7,600; Referees: Stark, Ştefan (ROU)

25 January 2016; 20:30	Poland	32–27	Belarus	Tauron Arena, Kraków; Attendance: 14,000; Referees: Santos, Fonseca (POR)
25 January 2016; 20:30	Jurecki 9	(19–13)	Shylovich 6	Tauron Arena, Kraków; Attendance: 14,000; Referees: Santos, Fonseca (POR)
25 January 2016; 20:30	3× (yellow card) 2× (suspension)	Report	3× (yellow card) 4× (suspension)	Tauron Arena, Kraków; Attendance: 14,000; Referees: Santos, Fonseca (POR)

27 January 2016; 16:00	Macedonia	29–30	Belarus	Tauron Arena, Kraków; Attendance: 3,100; Referees: Stoļarovs, Līcis (LAT)
27 January 2016; 16:00	K. Lazarov 10	(13–14)	Pukhouski 11	Tauron Arena, Kraków; Attendance: 3,100; Referees: Stoļarovs, Līcis (LAT)
27 January 2016; 16:00	3× (yellow card) 2× (suspension)	Report	2× (yellow card) 5× (suspension)	Tauron Arena, Kraków; Attendance: 3,100; Referees: Stoļarovs, Līcis (LAT)

27 January 2016; 18:15	France	24–29	Norway	Tauron Arena, Kraków; Attendance: 10,200; Referees: Geipel, Helbig (GER)
27 January 2016; 18:15	Narcisse 7	(11–12)	Tønnesen 6	Tauron Arena, Kraków; Attendance: 10,200; Referees: Geipel, Helbig (GER)
27 January 2016; 18:15	2× (yellow card) 3× (suspension)	Report	2× (yellow card) 7× (suspension)	Tauron Arena, Kraków; Attendance: 10,200; Referees: Geipel, Helbig (GER)

27 January 2016; 20:30	Poland	23–37	Croatia	Tauron Arena, Kraków; Attendance: 15,000; Referees: Gjeding, Hansen (DEN)
27 January 2016; 20:30	Bielecki, Daszek 4	(10–15)	Štrlek 11	Tauron Arena, Kraków; Attendance: 15,000; Referees: Gjeding, Hansen (DEN)
27 January 2016; 20:30	1× (yellow card) 6× (suspension)	Report	2× (yellow card) 5× (suspension)	Tauron Arena, Kraków; Attendance: 15,000; Referees: Gjeding, Hansen (DEN)

=== Group II ===
Pos	Team	Pld	W	D	L	GF	GA	GD	Pts	Qualification
1	Spain	5	4	0	1	135	130	+5	8 (Note: Spain 32–29 Germany)	Advanced to semifinals
2	Germany	5	4	0	1	140	129	+11	8	Advanced to semifinals
3	Denmark	5	3	1	1	139	123	+16	7	Advanced to fifth place game
4	Sweden	5	1	2	2	126	121	+5	4	Advanced to seventh place game
5	Russia	5	1	1	3	132	140	−8	3	Eliminated
6	Hungary	5	0	0	5	110	139	−29	0	Eliminated

Source: EHF-Euro
Rules for classification: 1) Points; 2) Head-to-head points; 3) Head-to-head goal difference; 4) Head-to-head goals scored; 5) Goal difference; 6) Goals scored; 7) Draw.
Notes:

22 January 2016; 18:15	Germany	29–19	Hungary	Hala Stulecia, Wrocław; Attendance: 6,500; Referees: Gubica, Milošević (CRO)
22 January 2016; 18:15	Wiede 6	(17–9)	three players 3	Hala Stulecia, Wrocław; Attendance: 6,500; Referees: Gubica, Milošević (CRO)
22 January 2016; 18:15	4× (yellow card) 2× (suspension)	Report	3× (yellow card) 3× (suspension)	Hala Stulecia, Wrocław; Attendance: 6,500; Referees: Gubica, Milošević (CRO)

22 January 2016; 20:30	Sweden	28–28	Russia	Hala Stulecia, Wrocław; Attendance: 6,350; Referees: Pichon, Reveret (FRA)
22 January 2016; 20:30	Jakobsson 9	(15–15)	Dibirov 7	Hala Stulecia, Wrocław; Attendance: 6,350; Referees: Pichon, Reveret (FRA)
22 January 2016; 20:30	4× (yellow card) 5× (suspension)	Report	3× (yellow card) 4× (suspension)	Hala Stulecia, Wrocław; Attendance: 6,350; Referees: Pichon, Reveret (FRA)

24 January 2016; 18:15	Germany	30–29	Russia	Hala Stulecia, Wrocław; Attendance: 6,593; Referees: Santos, Fonseca (POR)
24 January 2016; 18:15	Dissinger 7	(17–16)	Dibirov 7	Hala Stulecia, Wrocław; Attendance: 6,593; Referees: Santos, Fonseca (POR)
24 January 2016; 18:15	3× (yellow card) 5× (suspension)	Report	3× (yellow card) 1× (suspension)	Hala Stulecia, Wrocław; Attendance: 6,593; Referees: Santos, Fonseca (POR)

24 January 2016; 20:30	Spain	23–27	Denmark	Hala Stulecia, Wrocław; Attendance: 6,593; Referees: Nikolov, Nachevski (MKD)
24 January 2016; 20:30	Entrerríos, Rivera 4	(14–11)	Damgaard 6	Hala Stulecia, Wrocław; Attendance: 6,593; Referees: Nikolov, Nachevski (MKD)
24 January 2016; 20:30	3× (yellow card) 1× (suspension)	Report	3× (yellow card) 1× (suspension)	Hala Stulecia, Wrocław; Attendance: 6,593; Referees: Nikolov, Nachevski (MKD)

26 January 2016; 18:15	Spain	31–29	Hungary	Hala Stulecia, Wrocław; Attendance: 6,500; Referees: Gousko, Repkin (BLR)
26 January 2016; 18:15	Rivera 5	(15–15)	Nagy 9	Hala Stulecia, Wrocław; Attendance: 6,500; Referees: Gousko, Repkin (BLR)
26 January 2016; 18:15	3× (yellow card) 5× (suspension)	Report	3× (yellow card) 5× (suspension)	Hala Stulecia, Wrocław; Attendance: 6,500; Referees: Gousko, Repkin (BLR)

26 January 2016; 20:30	Sweden	28–28	Denmark	Hala Stulecia, Wrocław; Attendance: 6,593; Referees: Stoļarovs, Līcis (LAT)
26 January 2016; 20:30	three players 5	(13–15)	Damgaard 7	Hala Stulecia, Wrocław; Attendance: 6,593; Referees: Stoļarovs, Līcis (LAT)
26 January 2016; 20:30	3× (yellow card) 3× (suspension)	Report	3× (yellow card) 4× (suspension) 1× (red card)	Hala Stulecia, Wrocław; Attendance: 6,593; Referees: Stoļarovs, Līcis (LAT)

27 January 2016; 16:00	Sweden	22–14	Hungary	Hala Stulecia, Wrocław; Attendance: 5,900; Referees: Stark, Ştefan (ROU)
27 January 2016; 16:00	Nilsson, Östlund 5	(10–7)	Bodó 5	Hala Stulecia, Wrocław; Attendance: 5,900; Referees: Stark, Ştefan (ROU)
27 January 2016; 16:00	3× (yellow card) 5× (suspension)	Report	3× (yellow card) 1× (suspension)	Hala Stulecia, Wrocław; Attendance: 5,900; Referees: Stark, Ştefan (ROU)

27 January 2016; 18:15	Germany	25–23	Denmark	Hala Stulecia, Wrocław; Attendance: 6,593; Referees: Horáček, Novotný (CZE)
27 January 2016; 18:15	Fäth 6	(12–13)	Hansen 7	Hala Stulecia, Wrocław; Attendance: 6,593; Referees: Horáček, Novotný (CZE)
27 January 2016; 18:15	2× (yellow card) 4× (suspension)	Report	3× (yellow card) 4× (suspension)	Hala Stulecia, Wrocław; Attendance: 6,593; Referees: Horáček, Novotný (CZE)

27 January 2016; 20:30	Spain	25–23	Russia	Hala Stulecia, Wrocław; Attendance: 5,000; Referees: Gubica, Milošević (CRO)
27 January 2016; 20:30	Rivera 11	(11–12)	Dibirov 5	Hala Stulecia, Wrocław; Attendance: 5,000; Referees: Gubica, Milošević (CRO)
27 January 2016; 20:30	3× (yellow card) 2× (suspension)	Report	3× (yellow card) 3× (suspension)	Hala Stulecia, Wrocław; Attendance: 5,000; Referees: Gubica, Milošević (CRO)

== Knockout stage ==
=== Bracket ===
Semifinals
29 January 2016
Norway	33
Germany (OT)	34
29 January 2016
Spain	33
Croatia	29

Final
31 January 2016
Germany	24
Spain	17
Third place game
31 January 2016
Norway	24
Croatia	31

=== Semifinals ===
29 January 2016
18:30
Norway
33–34 (ET)
Germany
Tauron Arena, Kraków
Attendance: 9,100
Referees: Pichon, Reveret (FRA)
Bjørnsen 8
(13–14)
Reichmann 10
4× (yellow card) 6× (suspension)
Report
3× (yellow card) 2× (suspension)

FT: 27–27 ET: 6–7

29 January 2016; 21:00	Spain	33–29	Croatia	Tauron Arena, Kraków; Attendance: 11,100; Referees: Horáček, Novotný (CZE)
29 January 2016; 21:00	García, Rivera 6	(18–14)	Slišković 6	Tauron Arena, Kraków; Attendance: 11,100; Referees: Horáček, Novotný (CZE)
29 January 2016; 21:00	4× (yellow card) 2× (suspension)	Report	4× (yellow card) 3× (suspension)	Tauron Arena, Kraków; Attendance: 11,100; Referees: Horáček, Novotný (CZE)

=== Seventh place game ===
29 January 2016; 16:00	Poland	26–24	Sweden	Hala Stulecia, Wrocław; Attendance: 6,500; Referees: Gubica, Milošević (CRO)
29 January 2016; 16:00	Konitz, Krajewski 5	(12–12)	Nilsson 5	Hala Stulecia, Wrocław; Attendance: 6,500; Referees: Gubica, Milošević (CRO)
29 January 2016; 16:00	3× (yellow card) 1× (suspension)	Report	3× (yellow card) 1× (suspension)	Hala Stulecia, Wrocław; Attendance: 6,500; Referees: Gubica, Milošević (CRO)

=== Fifth place game ===
29 January 2016; 18:30	France	29–26	Denmark	Hala Stulecia, Wrocław; Attendance: 4,500; Referees: López, Ramírez (ESP)
29 January 2016; 18:30	Kounkoud 8	(15–13)	Balling 7	Hala Stulecia, Wrocław; Attendance: 4,500; Referees: López, Ramírez (ESP)
29 January 2016; 18:30	3× (yellow card) 1× (suspension)	Report	3× (yellow card) 3× (suspension) 1× (red card)	Hala Stulecia, Wrocław; Attendance: 4,500; Referees: López, Ramírez (ESP)

=== Third place game ===
31 January 2016; 15:00	Norway	24–31	Croatia	Tauron Arena, Kraków; Attendance: 12,500; Referees: Nachevski, Nikolov (MKD)
31 January 2016; 15:00	Sagosen 5	(11–15)	Horvat 8	Tauron Arena, Kraków; Attendance: 12,500; Referees: Nachevski, Nikolov (MKD)
31 January 2016; 15:00	4× (yellow card) 5× (suspension)	Report	3× (yellow card) 4× (suspension) 1× (red card)	Tauron Arena, Kraków; Attendance: 12,500; Referees: Nachevski, Nikolov (MKD)

=== Final ===
31 January 2016; 17:30	Germany	24–17	Spain	Tauron Arena, Kraków; Attendance: 15,000; Referees: Gjeding, Hansen (DEN)
31 January 2016; 17:30	Häfner 7	(10–6)	Entrerríos 5	Tauron Arena, Kraków; Attendance: 15,000; Referees: Gjeding, Hansen (DEN)
31 January 2016; 17:30	3× (yellow card) 8× (suspension)	Report	1× (yellow card) 4× (suspension)	Tauron Arena, Kraków; Attendance: 15,000; Referees: Gjeding, Hansen (DEN)

== Statistics ==
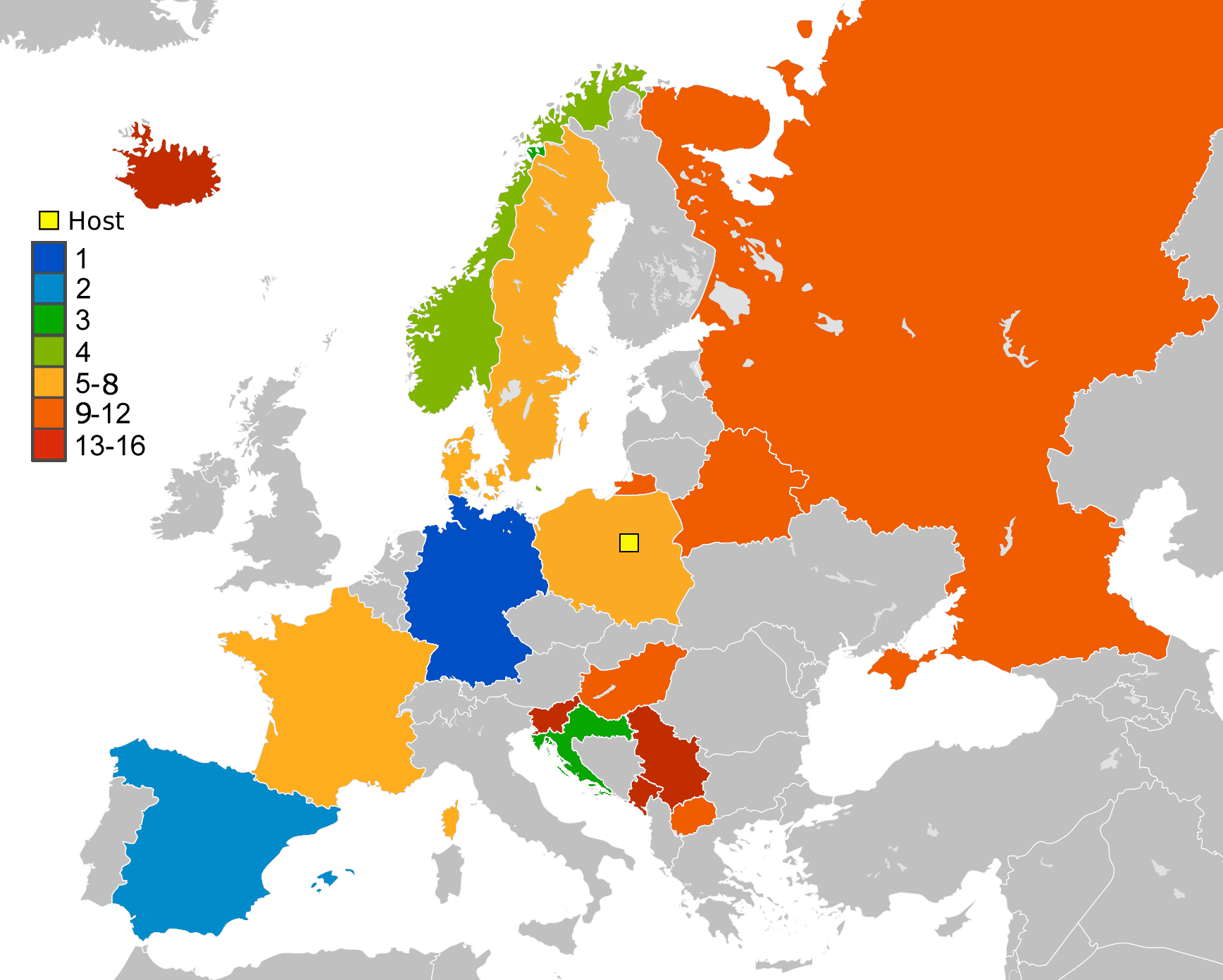
Results map

=== Final ranking and qualifications ===
Rank	Team	2017 WC	2016 OG
Gold medal	Germany	Q	Q
Silver medal	Spain	Q	q
Bronze medal	Croatia	Q	q
4	Norway		q
5	France	Host	Q
6	Denmark		q
7	Poland		q
8	Sweden		q
9	Russia		
10	Belarus		
11	Macedonia		q
12	Hungary		
13	Iceland		
14	Slovenia		q
15	Serbia		
16	Montenegro		

Based on this tournament	Q = qualified q = goes to qualification
Based on 2015 WC	Q = qualified q = goes to qualification

WC = World Championship, OG = Olympic Games

=== All Star Team ===
Position	Player
Goalkeeper	Andreas Wolff (GER)
Right wing	Tobias Reichmann (GER)
Right back	Johan Jakobsson (SWE)
Centre back	Sander Sagosen (NOR)
Left back	Michał Jurecki (POL)
Left wing	Manuel Štrlek (CRO)
Pivot	Julen Aguinagalde (ESP)

=== Player's awards ===
Award	Player
Most Valuable Player	Raúl Entrerríos (ESP)
Best Defence Player	Henrik Møllgaard (DEN)
Topscorer	Valero Rivera Folch (ESP) (48 goals)

=== Top goalscorers ===
Rank	Name	Goals	Shots	%
1	(Spain) Valero Rivera Folch	48	62	77
2	(Germany) Tobias Reichmann	46	58	79
3	(Norway) Kristian Bjørnsen	45	59	76
4	(Croatia) Manuel Štrlek	43	54	80
5	(North Macedonia) Kiril Lazarov	42	79	53
6	(Belarus) Barys Pukhouski	37	58	64
7	(Poland) Karol Bielecki	34	66	52
7	(Poland) Michal Jurecki	34	61	56
9	(Norway) Espen Lie Hansen	33	59	56
9	(Denmark) Mikkel Hansen	33	57	58

Source: handball.sportsresult.com Archived 2020-11-16 at the Wayback Machine

=== Top goalkeepers ===
Rank	Name	%	Saves	Shots
1	(France) Vincent Gérard	37	34	92
2	(Germany) Andreas Wolff	36	81	224
2	(Russia) Victor Kireev	36	74	203
4	(France) Thierry Omeyer	35	67	191
4	(Sweden) Mattias Andersson	35	59	170
6	(Belarus) Viachaslau Saldatsenka	34	79	232
6	(Croatia) Ivan Stevanović	34	49	143
6	(Denmark) Niklas Landin Jacobsen	34	65	193
6	(Spain) Arpad Sterbik	34	63	184
10	(Slovenia) Matevž Skok	33	13	39

Source: handball.sportsresult.com Archived 2018-01-28 at the Wayback Machine
