= Aliaksei Khadkevich =

Belarusian handball player

Personal information
- Nationality: Belarusian
- Born: 14 January 1994 (age 32) Orsha, Belarus
- Height: 1.91 m (6 ft 3 in)

Sport
- Sport: Handball
- Position: Left back
- Current club: RTV 1879 Basel

Senior clubs
- Years: Team
- 2010-2019: SKA Minsk
- 2019-2020: CSM Vaslui
- 2020-: RTV 1879 Basel
National team
Years	Team	Apps	(Gls)
–	Belarus	19	(44)

Aliaksei Khadkevich (born 14 January 1994) is a Belarusian handball player. He plays for RTV 1879 Basel in Switzerland and for the Belarusian national team.

He competed at the 2016 European Men's Handball Championship.'

In 2013 he won the EHF Challenge Cup with SKA Minsk.
