= Rutenka =

Rutenka is a surname. Notable people with the surname include:

- Dzianis Rutenka (born 1986), Belarusian handball player
- Siarhei Rutenka (born 1981), Belarusian former handball player
