= 2015–16 EHF Champions League knockout stage =

This article describes the knockout stage of the 2015–16 EHF Champions League.

== Qualified teams ==
The top six placed teams from each of the two groups advanced to the knockout stage.

Group	Qualified for quarterfinals	Qualified for Round of 16				
Group	First place	Second place	Third place	Fourth place	Fifth place	Sixth place
A	(France) Paris Saint-Germain	(Hungary) MVM Veszprém	(Germany) Flensburg-Handewitt	(Germany) THW Kiel	(Croatia) RK Zagreb	(Poland) Wisła Płock
B	(Spain) Barcelona Lassa	(Poland) Vive Tauron Kielce	(North Macedonia) Vardar	(Germany) Rhein-Neckar Löwen	(Hungary) MOL-Pick Szeged	(France) Montpellier
Playoff winners	(Ukraine) Motor Zaporizhzhia (Belarus) Meshkov Brest					

== Format ==
12 teams played a home and away in the first knock-out phase, with the 10 teams qualified from groups A and B and the two teams qualified from groups C and D. After that, the six winners of these matches in the first knock-out phase joined with the winners of groups A and B to play a home and away for the right to play in the final four.

== Round of 16 ==
Team 1	Agg.	Team 2	1st leg	2nd leg
Motor Zaporizhzhia (Ukraine)	52–70	(Hungary) MVM Veszprém	24–29	28–41
Meshkov Brest (Belarus)	58–65	(Poland) Vive Tauron Kielce	28–32	30–33
Montpellier (France)	57–59	(Germany) Flensburg-Handewitt	27–28	30–31
Wisła Płock (Poland)	54–55	(North Macedonia) Vardar	30–30	24–25
Pick Szeged (Hungary)	62–65	(Germany) THW Kiel	33–29	29–36
Zagreb (Croatia)	54–53	(Germany) Rhein-Neckar Löwen	23–24	31–29

=== Matches ===
19 March 2016; 18:00	Motor Zaporizhzhia (Ukraine)	24–29	(Hungary) MVM Veszprém	Palace of Sport, Brovary; Attendance: 2,200; Referees: Gjeding, Hansen (DEN)
19 March 2016; 18:00	Soroka 7	(12–12)	Marguč, Sulić 5	Palace of Sport, Brovary; Attendance: 2,200; Referees: Gjeding, Hansen (DEN)
19 March 2016; 18:00	1× (yellow card) 5× (suspension)	Report	3× (yellow card) 4× (suspension)	Palace of Sport, Brovary; Attendance: 2,200; Referees: Gjeding, Hansen (DEN)

26 March 2016; 17:00	MVM Veszprém (Hungary)	41–28	(Ukraine) Motor Zaporizhzhia	Veszprém Aréna, Veszprém; Attendance: 5,019; Referees: Baďura, Ondogrecula (SVK)
26 March 2016; 17:00	Nilsson 7	(23–14)	Shelmenko, Soroka 6	Veszprém Aréna, Veszprém; Attendance: 5,019; Referees: Baďura, Ondogrecula (SVK)
26 March 2016; 17:00	3× (yellow card) 2× (suspension)	Report	3× (yellow card) 3× (suspension)	Veszprém Aréna, Veszprém; Attendance: 5,019; Referees: Baďura, Ondogrecula (SVK)

MVM Veszprém won 70–52 on aggregate.

19 March 2016; 19:00	Meshkov Brest (Belarus)	28–32	(Poland) Vive Tauron Kielce	Universal Sports Complex Victoria, Brest; Attendance: 3,500; Referees: Pichon, Reveret (FRA)
19 March 2016; 19:00	Atman 7	(14–12)	Jurecki 10	Universal Sports Complex Victoria, Brest; Attendance: 3,500; Referees: Pichon, Reveret (FRA)
19 March 2016; 19:00	3× (yellow card) 4× (suspension)	Report	3× (yellow card) 5× (suspension) 1× (red card)	Universal Sports Complex Victoria, Brest; Attendance: 3,500; Referees: Pichon, Reveret (FRA)

26 March 2016; 16:00	Vive Tauron Kielce (Poland)	33–30	(Belarus) Meshkov Brest	Hala Legionów, Kielce; Attendance: 4,200; Referees: Nikolov, Nachevski (MKD)
26 March 2016; 16:00	Buntić 6	(14–14)	Stojković 7	Hala Legionów, Kielce; Attendance: 4,200; Referees: Nikolov, Nachevski (MKD)
26 March 2016; 16:00	3× (yellow card) 5× (suspension)	Report	4× (yellow card) 3× (suspension)	Hala Legionów, Kielce; Attendance: 4,200; Referees: Nikolov, Nachevski (MKD)

Vive Targi Kielce won 65–58 on aggregate.

19 March 2016; 17:30	Montpellier (France)	27–28	(Germany) Flensburg-Handewitt	Park&Suites Arena, Montpellier; Attendance: 2,800; Referees: Krstič, Ljubič (SLO)
19 March 2016; 17:30	Gajić 6	(13–15)	Mogensen, Svan Hansen 5	Park&Suites Arena, Montpellier; Attendance: 2,800; Referees: Krstič, Ljubič (SLO)
19 March 2016; 17:30	3× (yellow card) 3× (suspension)	Report	2× (yellow card) 5× (suspension)	Park&Suites Arena, Montpellier; Attendance: 2,800; Referees: Krstič, Ljubič (SLO)

27 March 2016; 17:00	Flensburg-Handewitt (Germany)	31–30	(France) Montpellier	Flens-Arena, Flensburg; Attendance: 5,700; Referees: Togstad, Kristiansen (NOR)
27 March 2016; 17:00	Eggert 12	(20–14)	Gajić 12	Flens-Arena, Flensburg; Attendance: 5,700; Referees: Togstad, Kristiansen (NOR)
27 March 2016; 17:00	3× (yellow card) 3× (suspension)	Report	3× (yellow card) 6× (suspension) 1× (red card)	Flens-Arena, Flensburg; Attendance: 5,700; Referees: Togstad, Kristiansen (NOR)

Flensburg-Handewitt won 59–57 on aggregate.

16 March 2016; 18:30	Wisła Płock (Poland)	30–30	(North Macedonia) Vardar	Orlen Arena, Płock; Attendance: 5,000; Referees: Gousko, Repkin (BLR)
16 March 2016; 18:30	Rocha 7	(16–14)	Karačić 6	Orlen Arena, Płock; Attendance: 5,000; Referees: Gousko, Repkin (BLR)
16 March 2016; 18:30	4× (yellow card) 3× (suspension)	Report	3× (yellow card) 3× (suspension)	Orlen Arena, Płock; Attendance: 5,000; Referees: Gousko, Repkin (BLR)

26 March 2016; 18:00	Vardar (North Macedonia)	25–24	(Poland) Wisła Płock	Jane Sandanski Arena, Skopje; Attendance: 5,500; Referees: Horáček, Novotný (CZE)
26 March 2016; 18:00	Toskić 8	(13–15)	Zhitnikov 7	Jane Sandanski Arena, Skopje; Attendance: 5,500; Referees: Horáček, Novotný (CZE)
26 March 2016; 18:00	3× (yellow card) 3× (suspension) 1× (red card)	Report	3× (yellow card) 3× (suspension) 1× (red card)	Jane Sandanski Arena, Skopje; Attendance: 5,500; Referees: Horáček, Novotný (CZE)

Vardar won 55–54 on aggregate.

20 March 2016; 18:30	Pick Szeged (Hungary)	33–29	(Germany) THW Kiel	Városi Sportcsarnok, Szeged; Attendance: 3,200; Referees: Gubica, Milošević (CRO)
20 March 2016; 18:30	Ancsin 6	(16–14)	Cañellas, Vujin 6	Városi Sportcsarnok, Szeged; Attendance: 3,200; Referees: Gubica, Milošević (CRO)
20 March 2016; 18:30	3× (yellow card)	Report	2× (yellow card) 2× (suspension)	Városi Sportcsarnok, Szeged; Attendance: 3,200; Referees: Gubica, Milošević (CRO)

23 March 2016; 18:30	THW Kiel (Germany)	36–29	(Hungary) Pick Szeged	Sparkassen-Arena, Kiel; Attendance: 9,500; Referees: Elíasson, Pálsson (ISL)
23 March 2016; 18:30	Vujin 9	(18–14)	Bombač, Källman 7	Sparkassen-Arena, Kiel; Attendance: 9,500; Referees: Elíasson, Pálsson (ISL)
23 March 2016; 18:30	3× (yellow card) 4× (suspension)	Report	3× (yellow card) 6× (suspension)	Sparkassen-Arena, Kiel; Attendance: 9,500; Referees: Elíasson, Pálsson (ISL)

THW Kiel won 65–62 on aggregate.

19 March 2016; 20:00	Zagreb (Croatia)	23–24	(Germany) Rhein-Neckar Löwen	Arena Zagreb, Zagreb; Attendance: 13,800; Referees: Dinu, Din (ROU)
19 March 2016; 20:00	three players 5	(12–10)	Gensheimer 7	Arena Zagreb, Zagreb; Attendance: 13,800; Referees: Dinu, Din (ROU)
19 March 2016; 20:00	4× (yellow card) 4× (suspension)	Report	4× (yellow card) 2× (suspension)	Arena Zagreb, Zagreb; Attendance: 13,800; Referees: Dinu, Din (ROU)

27 March 2016; 19:30	Rhein-Neckar Löwen (Germany)	29–31	(Croatia) Zagreb	SAP Arena, Mannheim; Attendance: 10,521; Referees: López, Ramírez (ESP)
27 March 2016; 19:30	Schmid 7	(15–13)	Šebetić, Vujić 5	SAP Arena, Mannheim; Attendance: 10,521; Referees: López, Ramírez (ESP)
27 March 2016; 19:30	2× (yellow card) 4× (suspension)	Report	3× (yellow card) 3× (suspension)	SAP Arena, Mannheim; Attendance: 10,521; Referees: López, Ramírez (ESP)

Zagreb won 54–53 on aggregate.

== Quarterfinals ==
Team 1	Agg.	Team 2	1st leg	2nd leg
Zagreb (Croatia)	52–60	(France) Paris Saint-Germain	20–28	32–32
THW Kiel (Germany)	59–57	(Spain) Barcelona Lassa	29–24	30–33
Vardar (North Macedonia)	56–59	(Hungary) MVM Veszprém	26–29	30–30
Flensburg-Handewitt (Germany)	56–57	(Poland) Vive Tauron Kielce	28–28	28–29

=== Matches ===
23 April 2016; 20:30	Zagreb (Croatia)	20–28	(France) Paris Saint-Germain	Arena Zagreb, Zagreb; Attendance: 15,200; Referees: Zotin, Volodkov (RUS)
23 April 2016; 20:30	Mandalinić, Vujić 4	(13–16)	Hansen 9	Arena Zagreb, Zagreb; Attendance: 15,200; Referees: Zotin, Volodkov (RUS)
23 April 2016; 20:30	3× (yellow card) 6× (suspension)	Report	3× (yellow card) 2× (suspension)	Arena Zagreb, Zagreb; Attendance: 15,200; Referees: Zotin, Volodkov (RUS)

1 May 2016; 17:00	Paris Saint-Germain (France)	32–32	(Croatia) Zagreb	Halle Georges Carpentier, Paris; Attendance: 4,800; Referees: Stark, Ştefan (ROU)
1 May 2016; 17:00	Onufryienko 7	(16–13)	Horvat 8	Halle Georges Carpentier, Paris; Attendance: 4,800; Referees: Stark, Ştefan (ROU)
1 May 2016; 17:00	3× (yellow card) 3× (suspension)	Report	3× (yellow card) 4× (suspension)	Halle Georges Carpentier, Paris; Attendance: 4,800; Referees: Stark, Ştefan (ROU)

Paris Saint-Germain won 60–52 on aggregate.

24 April 2016; 19:30	THW Kiel (Germany)	29–24	(Spain) Barcelona Lassa	Sparkassen-Arena, Kiel; Attendance: 10,285; Referees: Nikolić, Stojković (SRB)
24 April 2016; 19:30	Klein 9	(16–12)	Lazarov 6	Sparkassen-Arena, Kiel; Attendance: 10,285; Referees: Nikolić, Stojković (SRB)
24 April 2016; 19:30	3× (yellow card) 4× (suspension)	Report	3× (yellow card) 2× (suspension)	Sparkassen-Arena, Kiel; Attendance: 10,285; Referees: Nikolić, Stojković (SRB)

30 April 2016; 18:30	Barcelona Lassa (Spain)	33–30	(Germany) THW Kiel	Palau Blaugrana, Barcelona; Attendance: 6,762; Referees: Nikolov, Nachevski (MKD)
30 April 2016; 18:30	Entrerríos 6	(13–14)	Cañellas, Vujin 6	Palau Blaugrana, Barcelona; Attendance: 6,762; Referees: Nikolov, Nachevski (MKD)
30 April 2016; 18:30	3× (yellow card) 3× (suspension)	Report	3× (yellow card) 4× (suspension)	Palau Blaugrana, Barcelona; Attendance: 6,762; Referees: Nikolov, Nachevski (MKD)

THW Kiel won 59–57 on aggregate.

23 April 2016; 16:00	Vardar (North Macedonia)	26–29	(Hungary) MVM Veszprém	Jane Sandanski Arena, Skopje; Attendance: 5,500; Referees: Pichon, Reveret (FRA)
23 April 2016; 16:00	Dibirov, Karačić 6	(9–12)	Ilić 9	Jane Sandanski Arena, Skopje; Attendance: 5,500; Referees: Pichon, Reveret (FRA)
23 April 2016; 16:00	3× (yellow card) 4× (suspension)	Report	4× (yellow card) 4× (suspension)	Jane Sandanski Arena, Skopje; Attendance: 5,500; Referees: Pichon, Reveret (FRA)

30 April 2016; 17:30	MVM Veszprém (Hungary)	30–30	(North Macedonia) Vardar	Veszprém Aréna, Veszprém; Attendance: 5,019; Referees: Sondors, Līcis (LAT)
30 April 2016; 17:30	Ilić 9	(12–14)	Cindrić 5	Veszprém Aréna, Veszprém; Attendance: 5,019; Referees: Sondors, Līcis (LAT)
30 April 2016; 17:30	2× (yellow card) 7× (suspension)	Report	2× (yellow card) 4× (suspension)	Veszprém Aréna, Veszprém; Attendance: 5,019; Referees: Sondors, Līcis (LAT)

MVM Veszprém won 59–56 on aggregate.

23 April 2016; 17:30	Flensburg-Handewitt (Germany)	28–28	(Poland) Vive Tauron Kielce	Flens-Arena, Flensburg; Attendance: 5,367; Referees: Mažeika, Gatelis (LTU)
23 April 2016; 17:30	Glandorf 11	(13–14)	Čupić 5	Flens-Arena, Flensburg; Attendance: 5,367; Referees: Mažeika, Gatelis (LTU)
23 April 2016; 17:30	3× (yellow card) 1× (suspension)	Report	3× (yellow card) 5× (suspension)	Flens-Arena, Flensburg; Attendance: 5,367; Referees: Mažeika, Gatelis (LTU)

27 April 2016; 18:30	Vive Tauron Kielce (Poland)	29–28	(Germany) Flensburg-Handewitt	Hala Legionów, Kielce; Attendance: 4,200; Referees: Dentz, Reibel (FRA)
27 April 2016; 18:30	Jurecki 9	(14–13)	Schmidt, Svan 8	Hala Legionów, Kielce; Attendance: 4,200; Referees: Dentz, Reibel (FRA)
27 April 2016; 18:30	2× (yellow card) 8× (suspension) 1× (red card)	Report	3× (yellow card) 8× (suspension)	Hala Legionów, Kielce; Attendance: 4,200; Referees: Dentz, Reibel (FRA)

Vive Targi Kielce won 57–56 on aggregate.

== Final four ==
The final four was held at the Lanxess Arena in Cologne, Germany on 28 and 29 May 2016. The draw was held on 3 May 2016 at 12:00.

=== Bracket ===
Semifinals
28 May
(Poland) Vive Tauron Kielce	28
(France) Paris Saint-Germain	26
28 May
(Germany) THW Kiel	28
(Hungary) MVM Veszprém (ET)	31

Final
29 May
(Poland) Vive Tauron Kielce (Pen)	39
(Hungary) MVM Veszprém	38
Third place
29 May
(France) Paris Saint-Germain	29
(Germany) THW Kiel	27

=== Semifinals ===
28 May 2016; 15:15	Vive Tauron Kielce (Poland)	28–26	(France) Paris Saint-Germain	Lanxess Arena, Cologne; Attendance: 19,250; Referees: Geipel, Helbig (GER)
28 May 2016; 15:15	Jurecki 6	(16–16)	Hansen 10	Lanxess Arena, Cologne; Attendance: 19,250; Referees: Geipel, Helbig (GER)
28 May 2016; 15:15	2× (yellow card) 9× (suspension) 1× (red card)	Report	3× (yellow card) 4× (suspension) 1× (red card)	Lanxess Arena, Cologne; Attendance: 19,250; Referees: Geipel, Helbig (GER)

28 May 2016
18:00
THW Kiel (Germany)
28–31 (ET)
(Hungary) MVM Veszprém
Lanxess Arena, Cologne
Attendance: 19,250
Referees: Togstad, Kristiansen (NOR)
Vujin 8
(15–12)
Ilić 8
3× (yellow card) 4× (suspension)
Report
3× (yellow card) 3× (suspension)

FT: 25–25 ET: 3–6

=== Third place game ===
29 May 2016; 15:15	Paris Saint-Germain (France)	29–27	(Germany) THW Kiel	Lanxess Arena, Cologne; Attendance: 19,250; Referees: Elíasson, Pálsson (ISL)
29 May 2016; 15:15	Hansen 10	(15–11)	Dissinger 8	Lanxess Arena, Cologne; Attendance: 19,250; Referees: Elíasson, Pálsson (ISL)
29 May 2016; 15:15	3× (yellow card) 6× (suspension)	Report	3× (yellow card) 3× (suspension) 1× (red card)	Lanxess Arena, Cologne; Attendance: 19,250; Referees: Elíasson, Pálsson (ISL)

=== Final ===
29 May 2016
18:00
Vive Tauron Kielce (Poland)
39–38 (ET)
(Hungary) MVM Veszprém
Lanxess Arena, Cologne
Attendance: 19,250
Referees: López, Ramírez (ESP)
Reichmann 9
(13–17)
Ilić, Ugalde 6
3× (yellow card) 5× (suspension)
Report
3× (yellow card) 6× (suspension)

FT: 29–29 ET: 6–6 Pen: 4–3
