= Aliaksandr Padshyvalau =

Belarusian handball player

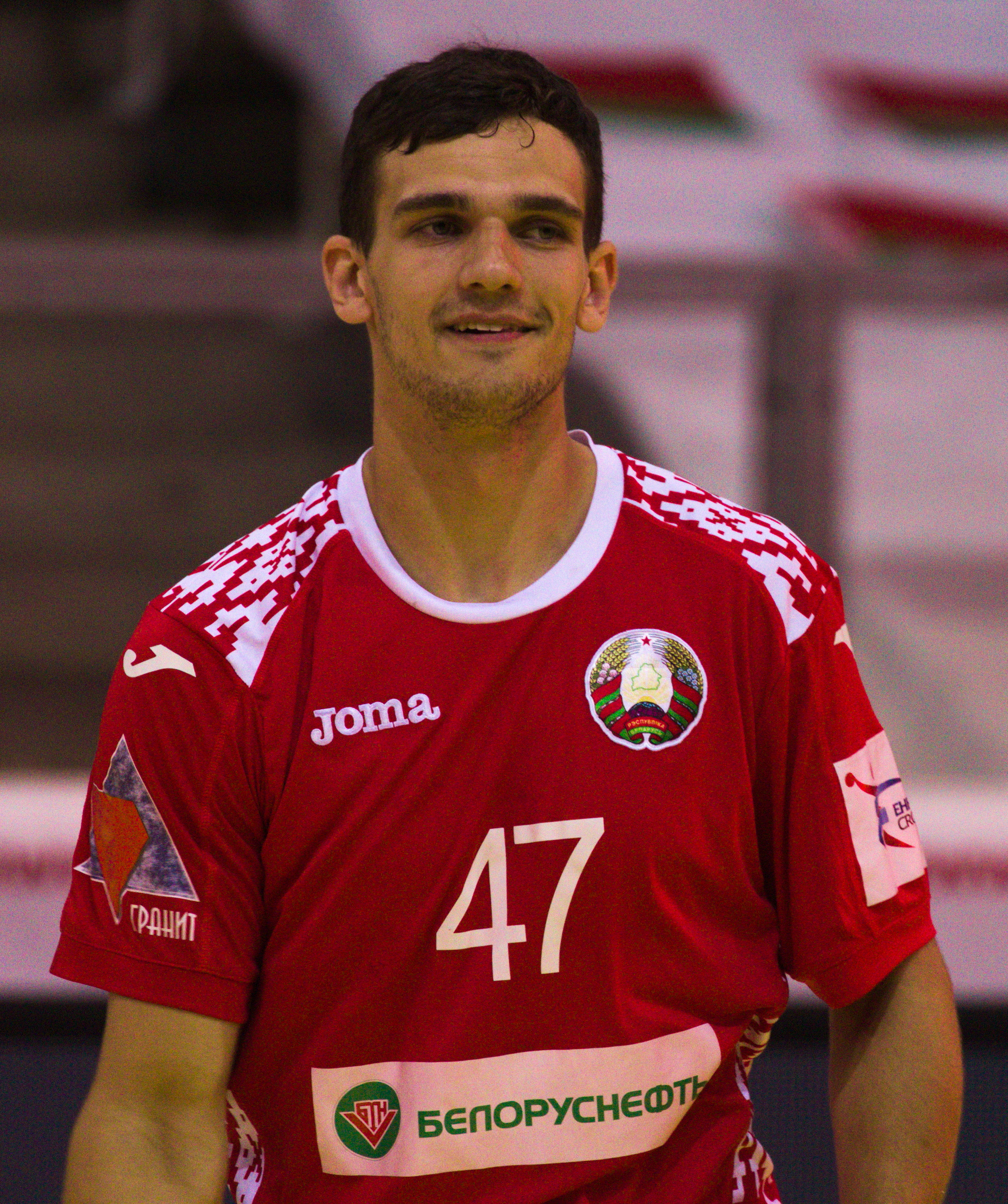

Personal information
- Nationality: Belarusian
- Born: 8 March 1996 (age 30) Minsk, Belarus
- Height: 1.90 m (6 ft 3 in)

Sport
- Sport: Handball
- Position: Centre back
- Current club: without a club
National team
Years	Team	Apps	(Gls)
–	Belarus	55	(81)

Aliaksandr Padshyvalau (Belarusian: Аляксандр Падшывалаў; born 8 March 1996) is a Belarusian handball player for SKA Minsk and the Belarusian national team.

He participated at the 2017 World Men's Handball Championship.
