= Mikhail Yakimovich =

Belarusian handball player

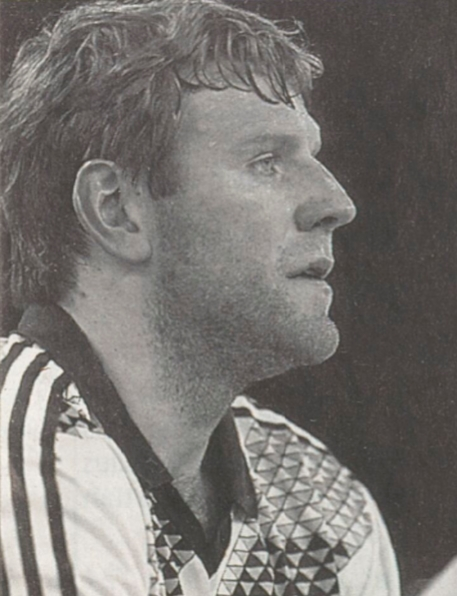
- Yakimovich in 1992

Personal information
- Full name: Mikhail Ivanovich Yakimovich
- Born: 13 January 1967 (age 59) Slutsk, Byelorussian SSR, Soviet Union
- Height: 1.87 m (6 ft 2 in)

Sport
- Sport: Handball
- Position: Left Backcourt

Senior clubs
- Years: Team
- –1992: SKA Minsk
- 1992–1999: Teka Cantabria
- 1999–2004: Portland San Antonio
National team
- Years: Team
- –: Soviet Union
- 1992: Unified Team
- 1992–1995: Belarus
Medal record
Representing Soviet Union
World Championships
Silver medal – second place	1990 Czechoslovakia	Team
Representing the Unified Team
Olympic Games
Gold medal – first place	1992 Barcelona	Team
- Updated on June 2009 (UTC)

Mikhail Ivanovich Yakimovich (Belarusian: Міхаіл Іванавіч Якімовіч; Russian: Михаил Иванович Якимович, born 13 January 1967) is a former Belarusian handball player. Throughout his senior career, Yakimovich played for SKA Minsk in the Soviet Union/Belarus, and later for Teka Cantabria and Portland San Antonio in Spain. Besides numerous other achievements, he won the EHF Champions League with all the three teams.

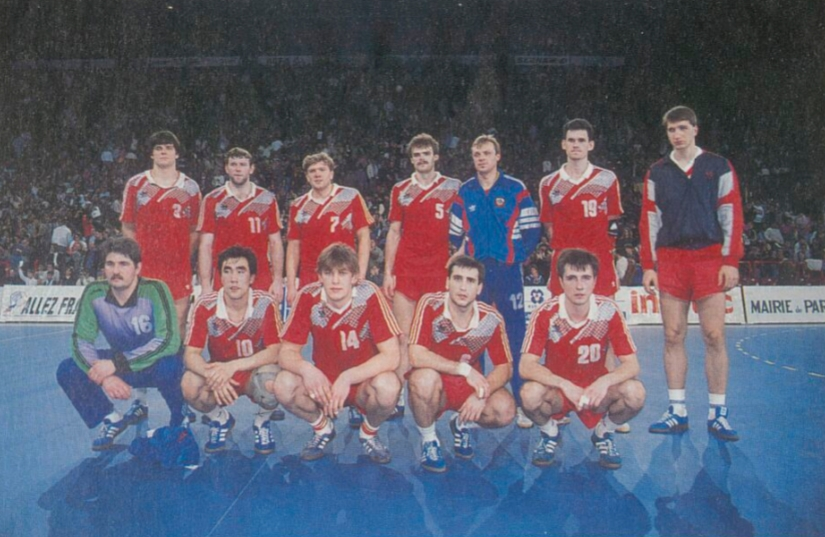
The CIS team in 1992

In 1990 he won a silver medal on the World Championship as a member of the Soviet Union team. Two years later he won the gold medal on the 1992 Olympics with the Unified Team. After the Soviet Union was disbanded, he opted to play for the national team of his native Belarus. He participated on several tournaments with the Belarusian team, and although they never won any medals, he gained several individual recognitions, like coming in as the third best scorer overall on the 1995 World Championship.
