= Klimovets =

Klimovets (Belarusian: Клімавец) is a gender-neutral Slavic surname. Notable people with the surname include:

- Andrej Klimovets (born 1974), Belarusian-German handball player
- Natalya Safronava (née Klimovets in 1974), Belarusian triple jumper
