= Andrej Klimovets =

Belarusian-German handball player (born 1974)

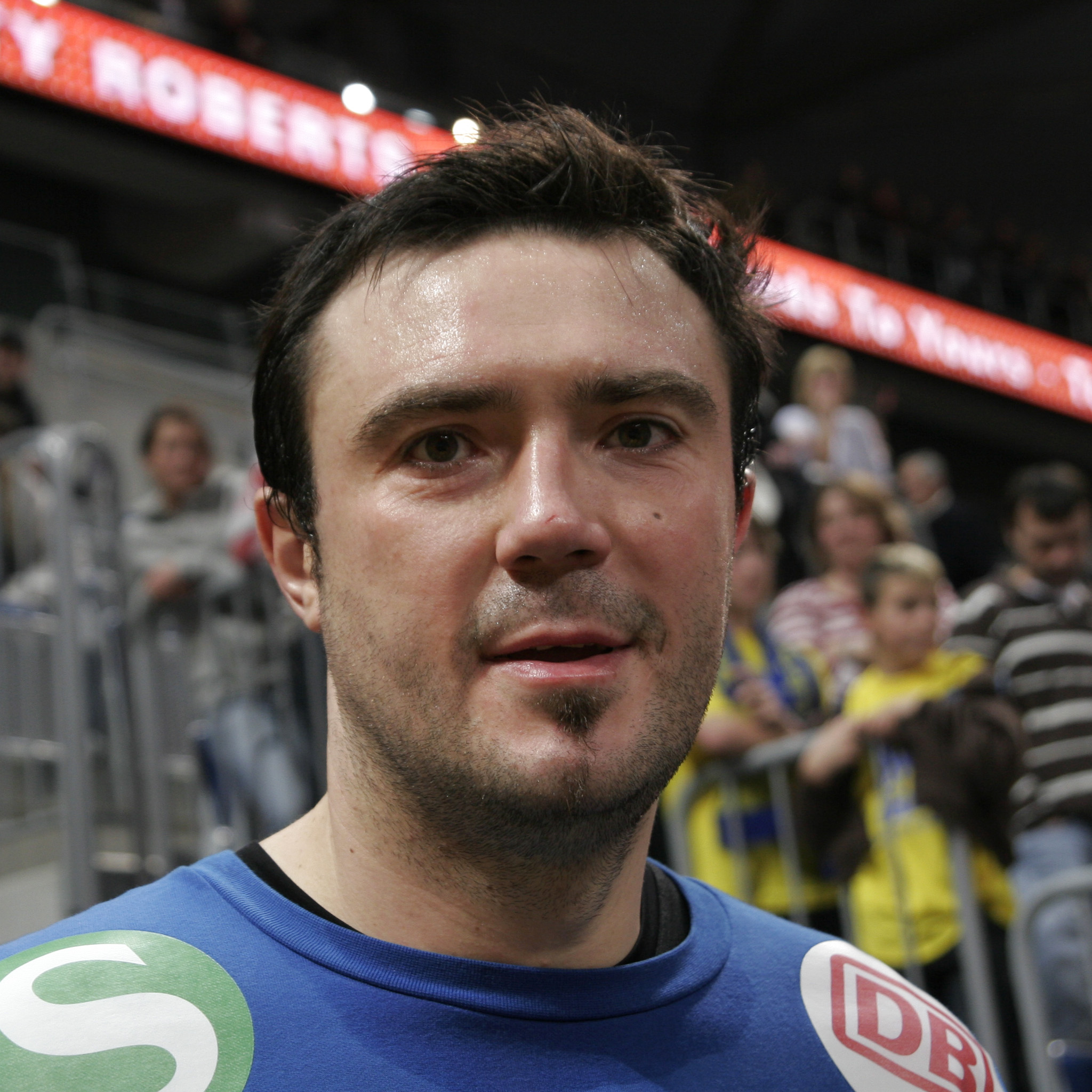
- Klimovets in 2007

Personal information
- Nationality: German, Bularussian
- Born: August 18, 1974 (age 52) Gomel, Belarusian SSR, Soviet Union
- Height: 197 cm (78 in)

Sport
- Sport: Handball
- Position: Pivot

Senior clubs
- Years: Team
- 1984–1991: SK Homel
- 1991-1995: SKA Minsk
- 1995-1996: TuS Spenge
- 1996-1997: OSC Rheinhausen
- 1997-2005: SG Flensburg-Handewitt
- 2005-2010: Rhein-Neckar Löwen
- 2010-2011: MT Melsungen
- 2011-2012: TSG Haßloch
- 2012: HSG Wetzlar
- 2012: TGS Pforzheim
National team
Years	Team	Apps	(Gls)
??-2005	Belarus	101	(328)
2005-	Germany	71	(169)
Medal record
Men's handball
Representing Germany
World Championship
Gold medal – first place	2007 Germany	Team competition

Andrej Klimovets (Belarusian: Андрэй Клімавец, Andrej Klimavets; born August 18, 1974, in Gomel, Belarusian SSR, Soviet Union) is a former Belarusian and from 2005 German team handball player. He played for both national teams. He is World champion from 2007 with the German national team. He participated on the German team that finished 4th at the 2008 European Men's Handball Championship.

He competed for Germany in handball at the 2008 Summer Olympics.

== Career ==
With SKA Minsk Klimovets won three Belarusian championships in a row from 1993 to 1995 and reached the final of the IHF Cup in 1992, where they lost to SG Wallau-Massenheim. His first German club was TuS Spenge in the Regionalliga, followed by OSC Rheinhausen and then SG Flensburg-Handewitt. With Flensburg-Handewitt he won the 2004 Bundesliga, the 2003 and 2005 DHB-Pokal, the 1999 Euro-City-Cup and the 2001 EHF Cup Winners' Cup.

In 2005 he left Flensburg for SG Kronau-Östringen (which became Rhein-Neckar Löwen in 2007). In the 2010-11 season he played for MT Melsungen, and then joined TSG Haßloch for the first half of the 2011-12 season. The latter half he played for HSG Wetzlar. As he was still registrered for TSG Haßloch during his first match for HSG Wetzlar, he was banned for the rest of the season. His last club was TGS Pforzheim in the Oberliga in Baden-Württemberg.

== International career ==
Andrej Klimovets played 112 matches for the Belarusian national team. At the 1994 European Championship he got an 8th place with the Belarus team, and at the 1995 World Championship he got a 9th place. After he arrived in Germany in 1996 he obtained German citizenship in 2005. His first match for the German national team was on 26 October 2005 against Croatia. At the 2006 European Championship he represented Germany at his first major international tournament, where Germany finished 5th.

At the 2007 World Championship he was injured during the warm-up to the match against Argentina, and was not able to play until the semifinal. The German coach Heiner Brand nominated Christian Schwarzer to replace him. He did however return and won gold medals with the German team, for which he was awarded the Silbernes Lorbeerblatt.

At the 2008 European Championship he once again represented Germany. Here he met his former national team, Belarus, and even faced against his own brother Uladzimir Klimavets. Germany finished 4th in the tournament, losing to France in the third place playoff 26-36.

== Private ==
His brother Uladzimir Klimavets is also a handball player, who has featured in the Belarus national team.
