= Siarhei Shylovich =

Belarusian handball player

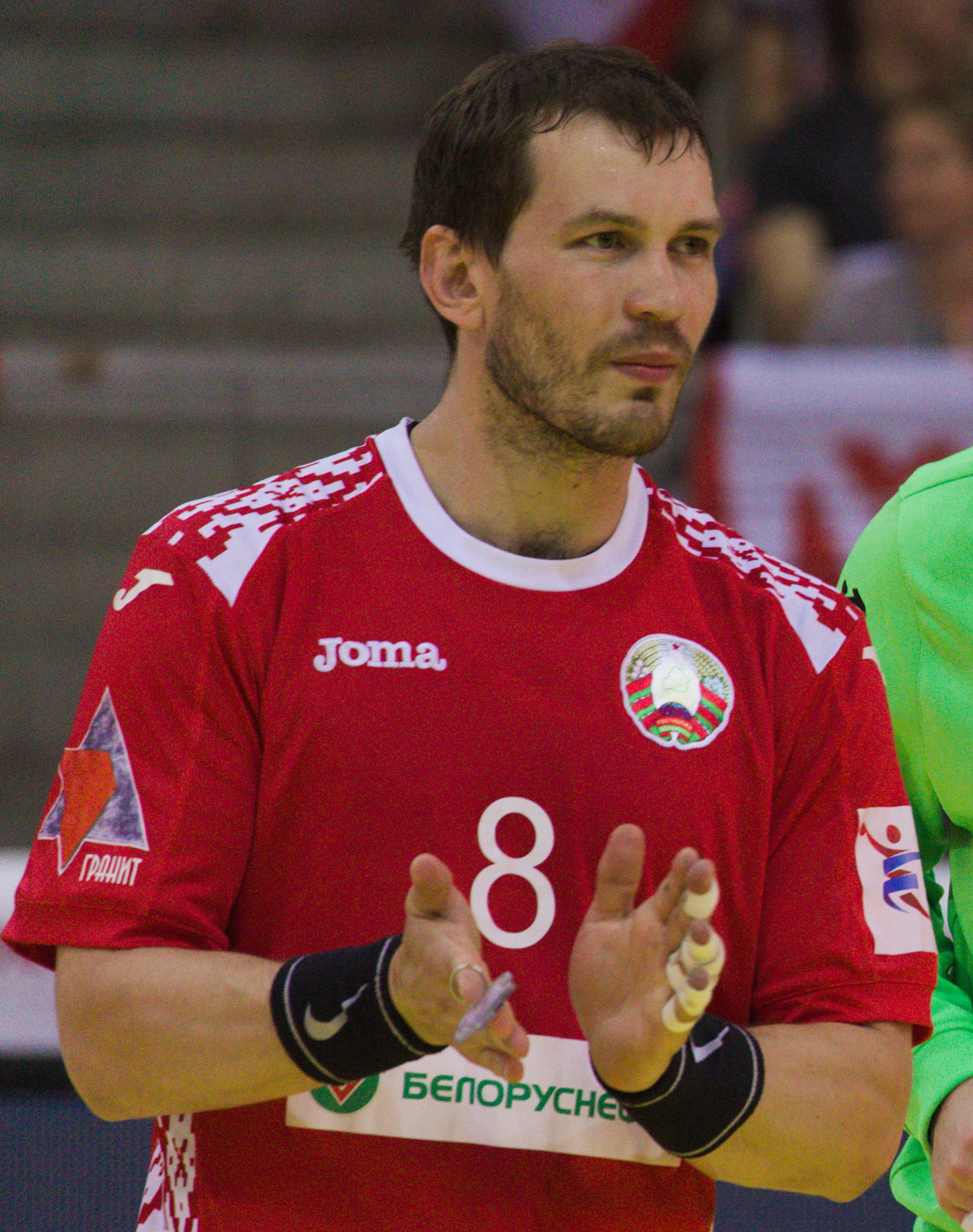

Personal information
- Nationality: Belarusian
- Born: 16 May 1986 (age 40) Babruysk, Byelorussian SSR, Soviet Union
- Height: 1.96 m (6 ft 5 in)

Sport
- Sport: Handball
- Position: Right back
- Current club: SKA Minsk (coach)

Senior clubs
- Years: Team
- 2013–2014: Pogoń Szczecin
- 2014–2019: Meshkov Brest
- 2019–2020: SKA Minsk
National team
Years	Team	Apps	(Gls)
–	Belarus	157	(495)

Teams managed
- 2023–2025: SKA Minsk (coach)

Siarhei Shylovich (born 16 May 1986) is a Belarusian handball coach for SKA Minsk.
