= Dzmitry Nikulenkau =

Belarusian handball player

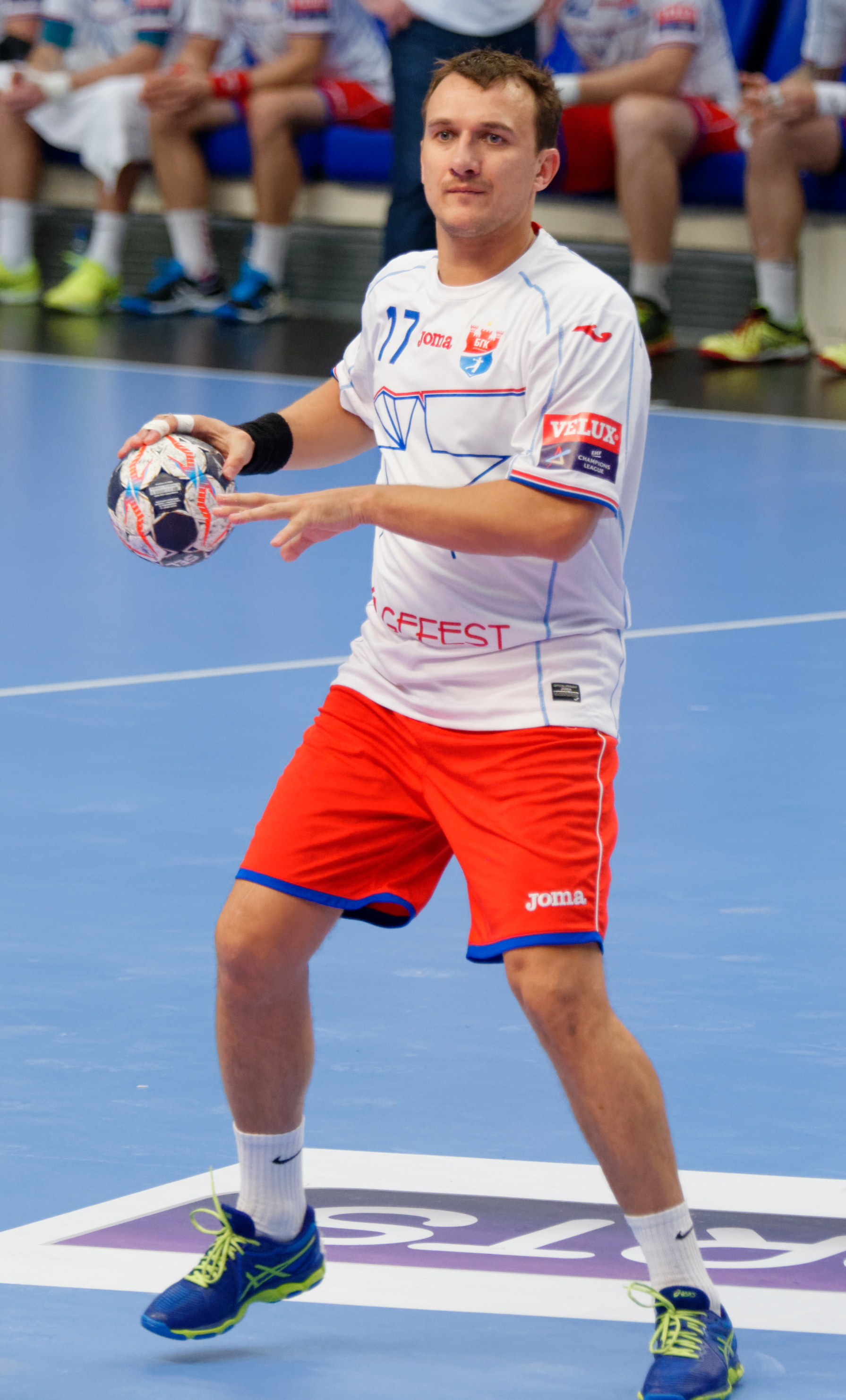

Personal information
- Nationality: Belarusian
- Born: 12 July 1984 (age 42) Minsk, Soviet Union
- Height: 1.92 m (6 ft 4 in)

Sport
- Sport: Handball
- Position: Centre back
- Current club: SKA Minsk (head coach)

Senior clubs
- Years: Team
- 2002–2004: Arkatron Minsk
- 2004–2008: Vive Kielce
- 2008–2014: Dinamo Minsk
- 2014–2018: Meshkov Brest
- 2018–2020: SKA Minsk
National team
Years	Team	Apps	(Gls)
2003–2020	Belarus	119	(205)

Teams managed
- 2020–2023: SKA Minsk (coach)
- 2022–: Belarus (coach)
- 2023–: SKA Minsk

Dzmitry Nikulenkau (born 12 July 1984) is a former Belarusian handball player for SKA Minsk and the Belarusian national team.
