= Maksim Baranau =

Belarusian handball player

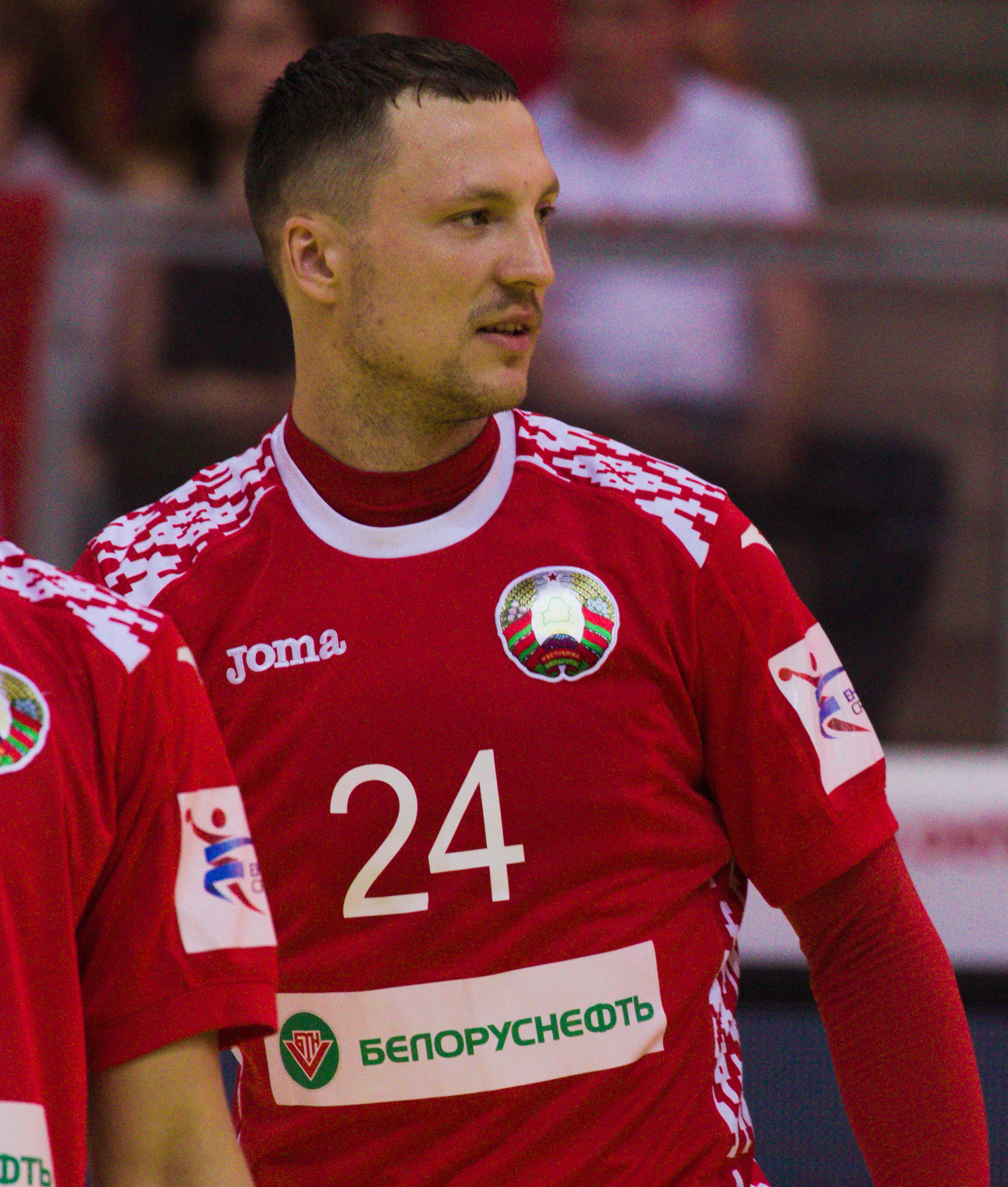

Personal information
- Nationality: Belarusian
- Born: 11 April 1988 (age 38) Babruysk, Byelorussian SSR, Soviet Union
- Height: 1.90 m (6 ft 3 in)

Sport
- Sport: Handball
- Position: Right wing
- Current club: HC Meshkov Brest
- Number: 24
National team
Years	Team	Apps	(Gls)
–	Belarus	149	(357)

Maksim Baranau (born 11 April 1988) is a Belarusian handball player for HC Meshkov Brest and the Belarusian national team.
