= 2015–16 EHF Champions League =

European handball tournament

EHF Champions League
- 2015–16

Tournament information
- Sport: Handball
- Location: Lanxess Arena (FINAL4)
- Dates: 5 September 2015–29 May 2016
- Teams: 28 (group stage); 31 (total)
- Website: ehfcl.com

Final positions
- Champions: (Poland) Vive Tauron Kielce
- Runner-up: (Hungary) MVM Veszprém

Tournament statistics
- Matches played: 201
- Goals scored: 11168 (55.56 per match)
- Attendance: 843,367 (4,196 per match)
- Top scorer(s): Mikkel Hansen (DEN) (141 goals)

The 2015–16 EHF Champions League was the 56th edition of Europe's premier club handball tournament and the 23rd edition under the current EHF Champions League format. FC Barcelona Lassa was the defending champion.

Vive Tauron Kielce defeated MVM Veszprém in the final to capture their first title.

== Overview ==
=== Team allocation ===
Twenty-seven teams were directly qualified for the group stage.

Groups A/B
(Croatia) Zagreb	(Denmark) KIF Kolding København	(France) Montpellier	(France) Paris Saint-Germain
(Germany) Rhein-Neckar Löwen	(Germany) Flensburg-Handewitt	(Germany) THW Kiel	(Hungary) MOL-Pick Szeged
(Hungary) MVM Veszprém	(North Macedonia) Vardar	(Poland) Vive Tauron Kielce	(Poland) Wisła Płock
(Slovenia) Celje	(Spain) Barcelona Lassa^{TH}	(Sweden) IFK Kristianstad	(Turkey) Beşiktaş
Groups C/D
(Belarus) Meshkov Brest	(Denmark) Skjern Håndbold	(North Macedonia) Metalurg Skopje	(Portugal) Porto
(Romania) HC Baia Mare	(Russia) Chekhovskiye Medvedi	(Serbia) Vojvodina	(Slovakia) Tatran Prešov
(Spain) Logroño	(Switzerland) Kadetten Schaffhausen	(Ukraine) Motor Zaporizhzhia	
Qualification tournament
(Austria) Alpla HC Hard	(Bosnia and Herzegovina) RK Banja Luka	(Netherlands) Limburg Lions	(Norway) Elverum Håndball

- ^{TH = Title holders}

=== Competition format ===
In March 2014, EHF introduced a new competition format.

Twenty-eight teams participated in the competition, divided in four groups. Groups A and B played with eight teams each, in a round robin, home and away format. The top team in each group qualified directly for the quarter-finals, the bottom two in each group dropped out of the competition and the remaining 10 teams qualified for the first knock-out phase.

In groups C and D, six teams played in each group in a round robin format, playing both home and away. The top two teams in each group then met in a 'semi-final' play-off, with the two winners going through to the first knock-out phase. The remaining teams dropped out of the competition.

Knock-out Phase 1 (Last 12)

12 teams played home and away in the first knock-out phase, with the 10 teams qualified from groups A and B and the two teams qualified from groups C and D.

Knock-out Phase 2 (Quarterfinals)

The six winners of the matches in the first knock-out phase joined with the winners of groups A and B to play home and away for the right to play in the VELUX EHF FINAL4.

Final four

The culmination of the season, the VELUX EHF FINAL4, with the four top teams from the competition competing for the title.

=== Round and draw dates ===
All draws held at the European Handball Federation headquarters in Vienna, Austria.

Phase	Draw date
Group stage	26 June 2015
Knockout stage	26 June 2015
Final Four (Cologne)	3 May 2016

== Qualification stage ==
There was no draw held. The four teams played a semifinal and final to determine the last participant. Matches were played on 5 and 6 September 2015. RK Banja Luka organized the tournament.

=== Bracket ===
Semifinals
5 September 2015
(Norway) Elverum Håndball	35
(Netherlands) Limburg Lions	30
5 September 2015
(Austria) Alpla HC Hard	35
(Bosnia and Herzegovina) RK Banja Luka	33

Final
6 September 2015
(Norway) Elverum Håndball	28
(Austria) Alpla HC Hard	25
Third place
6 September 2015
(Netherlands) Limburg Lions	33
(Bosnia and Herzegovina) RK Banja Luka	29

All times are local (UTC+2).

=== Semifinals ===
5 September 2015; 17:30	Elverum Håndball (Norway)	35–30	(Netherlands) Limburg Lions	Sportska dvorana Borik, Banja Luka; Attendance: 500; Referees: Gasmi, Gasmi (FRA)
5 September 2015; 17:30	Burud 9	(14–15)	Baart, Steins 7	Sportska dvorana Borik, Banja Luka; Attendance: 500; Referees: Gasmi, Gasmi (FRA)
5 September 2015; 17:30	3× (yellow card) 3× (suspension)	Report	3× (yellow card) 4× (suspension)	Sportska dvorana Borik, Banja Luka; Attendance: 500; Referees: Gasmi, Gasmi (FRA)

5 September 2015; 20:00	Alpla HC Hard (Austria)	35–33	(Bosnia and Herzegovina) RK Banja Luka	Sportska dvorana Borik, Banja Luka; Attendance: 3,500; Referees: Baranowski, Lemanowicz (POL)
5 September 2015; 20:00	Zeiner 8	(17–14)	Trivundža 13	Sportska dvorana Borik, Banja Luka; Attendance: 3,500; Referees: Baranowski, Lemanowicz (POL)
5 September 2015; 20:00	3× (yellow card) 7× (suspension) 1× (red card)	Report	3× (yellow card) 11× (suspension) 1× (red card)	Sportska dvorana Borik, Banja Luka; Attendance: 3,500; Referees: Baranowski, Lemanowicz (POL)

=== Third place game ===
6 September 2015; 17:30	Limburg Lions (Netherlands)	33–29	(Bosnia and Herzegovina) RK Banja Luka	Sportska dvorana Borik, Banja Luka; Attendance: 400; Referees: Gasmi, Gasmi (FRA)
6 September 2015; 17:30	Heijnen 7	(16–14)	Janković 8	Sportska dvorana Borik, Banja Luka; Attendance: 400; Referees: Gasmi, Gasmi (FRA)
6 September 2015; 17:30	3× (yellow card) 5× (suspension)	Report	3× (yellow card) 3× (suspension)	Sportska dvorana Borik, Banja Luka; Attendance: 400; Referees: Gasmi, Gasmi (FRA)

=== Final ===
6 September 2015; 20:00	Elverum Håndball (Norway)	28–25	(Austria) Alpla HC Hard	Sportska dvorana Borik, Banja Luka; Attendance: 400; Referees: Baranowski, Lemanowicz (POL)
6 September 2015; 20:00	Stegavik 10	(15–11)	Schlinger 8	Sportska dvorana Borik, Banja Luka; Attendance: 400; Referees: Baranowski, Lemanowicz (POL)
6 September 2015; 20:00	3× (yellow card) 4× (suspension)	Report	2× (yellow card) 4× (suspension)	Sportska dvorana Borik, Banja Luka; Attendance: 400; Referees: Baranowski, Lemanowicz (POL)

== Group stage ==
Location of teams of the 2014–15 EHF Champions League group stage.
Red: Group A; Blue: Group B; Green: Group C; Yellow: Group D.

The draw for the group stage was held on 26 June 2015, 20:00 CEST, in the Vienna city centre. The 28 teams were drawn into four groups, two containing eight teams (Groups A and B) and two containing six teams (Groups C and D). The only restriction was that teams from the same national association could not face each other in the same group. Since Germany qualified three teams, the lowest seeded side (Flensburg-Handewitt) had necessarily to be drawn with one of the other two.

In each group, teams played against each other in a double round-robin format, with home and away matches. The matchdays are 16–20 September, 23–27 September, 30 September–4 October, 7–11 October, 14–18 October, 21–25 October, 11–15 November, 18–22 November, 25–29 November and 2–6 December 2015. For Groups A and B, additional matchdays include 10–14 February, 17–21 February, 24–28 February and 2–6 March 2016.

After completion of the group stage matches, the teams advancing to the knockout stage were determined in the following manner:

- Groups A and B – the top team qualified directly for the quarter-finals, and the five teams ranked 2nd–6th advanced to the first knockout round.
- Groups C and D – the top two teams from both groups contested a playoff to determine the last two sides joining the 10 teams from Groups A and B in the first knockout round.

Tiebreakers
In the group stage, teams are ranked according to points (2 points for a win, 1 point for a draw, 0 points for a loss). After completion of the group stage, if two or more teams have scored the same number of points, the ranking will be determined as follows (article 4.3.1, section II of regulations):
1. Highest number of points in matches between the teams directly involved;
2. Superior goal difference in matches between the teams directly involved;
3. Highest number of goals scored in matches between the teams directly involved (or in the away match in case of a two-team tie);
4. Superior goal difference in all matches of the group;
5. Highest number of plus goals in all matches of the group;

If the ranking of one of these teams is determined, the above criteria are consecutively followed until the ranking of all teams is determined. If no ranking can be determined, a decision shall be obtained by EHF through drawing of lots.

During the group stage, only criteria 4–5 apply to determine the provisional ranking of teams.

=== Group A ===
Pos	Team	Pld	W	D	L	GF	GA	GD	Pts	Qualification	PAR	VES	FLE	KIE	ZAG	PLO	CEL	BES
1	(France) Paris Saint-Germain	14	12	0	2	442	389	+53	24	Advanced to quarterfinals	—	29–27	35–32	37–30	34–23	29–24	32–27	40–28
2	(Hungary) MVM Veszprém	14	11	1	2	402	364	+38	23	Advanced to first knockout round	28–20	—	28–24	29–27	27–25	27–25	34–28	33–25
3	(Germany) Flensburg-Handewitt	14	10	0	4	429	380	+49	20	Advanced to first knockout round	39–32	28–29	—	37–27	28–27	27–25	30–20	33–25
4	(Germany) THW Kiel	14	8	1	5	400	388	+12	17	Advanced to first knockout round	26–30	25–24	27–23	—	31–29	26–24	35–32	32–21
5	(Croatia) Zagreb	14	5	1	8	358	367	−9	11	Advanced to first knockout round	23–25	20–21	23–30	29–22	—	29–25	24–23	32–26
6	(Poland) Wisła Płock	14	3	2	9	372	397	−25	8	Advanced to first knockout round	22–27	27–27	30–34	23–37	23–23	—	26–31	32–26
7	(Slovenia) Celje	14	3	1	10	385	398	−13	7		30–32	27–30	26–30	23–23	20–21	25–28	—	43–29
8	(Turkey) Beşiktaş	14	1	0	13	382	487	−105	2		30–40	34–38	26–34	27–32	32–30	29–38	24–30	—

Source: EHF
Rules for classification: See Tiebreakers

=== Group B ===
Pos	Team	Pld	W	D	L	GF	GA	GD	Pts	Qualification	BAR	KIE	VAR	RNL	SZE	MON	KRI	KOL
1	(Spain) Barcelona Lassa	14	11	1	2	423	372	+51	23	Advanced to quarter-finals	—	31–33	31–30	26–20	30–25	37–27	34–32	28–25
2	(Poland) Vive Tauron Kielce	14	9	3	2	425	399	+26	21	Advanced to first knockout round	30–30	—	23–20	28–27	27–26	30–23	35–27	33–31
3	(North Macedonia) Vardar	14	9	0	5	416	373	+43	18	Advanced to first knockout round	25–27	34–24	—	25–19	27–23	34–26	38–31	34–24
4	(Germany) Rhein-Neckar Löwen	14	8	1	5	369	353	+16	17	Advanced to first knockout round	22–21	32–32	28–27	—	30–25	25–21	29–20	24–20
5	(Hungary) MOL-Pick Szeged	14	7	1	6	404	390	+14	15	Advanced to first knockout round	28–30	31–30	29–31	30–24	—	28–27	35–28	34–23
6	(France) Montpellier	14	3	1	10	372	413	−41	7 (Note: Montpellier 60–55 Kristianstad)	Advanced to first knockout round	23–31	27–32	25–30	28–30	29–29	—	30–26	30–25
7	(Sweden) IFK Kristianstad	14	3	1	10	409	437	−28	7		24–31	35–35	25–30	32–29	32–34	29–30	—	33–26
8	(Denmark) KIF Kolding København	14	2	0	12	348	429	−81	4		28–36	25–33	33–31	18–30	22–27	27–26	21–30	—

Source: EHF
Rules for classification: See Tiebreakers

=== Group C ===
Pos	Team	Pld	W	D	L	GF	GA	GD	Pts	Qualification	BRE	LOG	POR	MED	VOJ	PRE
1	(Belarus) Meshkov Brest	10	8	0	2	321	264	+57	16	Advanced to playoffs	—	31–33	34–27	32–26	34–22	32–26
2	(Spain) Logroño	10	7	0	3	298	270	+28	14 (Note: Logroño–Porto 61–58)	Advanced to playoffs	28–32	—	30–23	30–26	31–22	37–29
3	(Portugal) Porto	10	7	0	3	296	265	+31	14		29–28	35–31	—	31–27	37–15	33–23
4	(Russia) Chekhovskiye Medvedi	10	4	0	6	271	292	−21	8		27–33	27–26	30–29	—	34–30	29–28
5	(Serbia) Vojvodina	10	2	0	8	241	297	−56	4 (Note: Tatran Prešov–Vojvodina 44–51)		26–35	26–31	23–27	26–24	—	24–25
6	(Slovakia) Tatran Prešov	10	2	0	8	240	279	−39	4		20–30	19–21	24–25	27–21	19–27	—

Source: EHF
Rules for classification: See Tiebreakers

=== Group D ===
Pos	Team	Pld	W	D	L	GF	GA	GD	Pts	Qualification	ZAP	SKJ	SCH	HCM	ELV	MET
1	(Ukraine) Motor Zaporizhzhia	10	7	1	2	296	277	+19	15	Advanced to playoffs	—	31–26	31–23	25–23	33–30	30–24
2	(Denmark) Skjern Håndbold	10	6	2	2	293	271	+22	14	Advanced to playoffs	36–36	—	25–29	32–28	34–29	20–19
3	(Switzerland) Kadetten Schaffhausen	10	5	1	4	270	270	0	11		30–27	24–30	—	24–23	30–31	27–17
4	(Romania) HC Baia Mare	10	3	3	4	264	268	−4	9		35–30	28–28	31–31	—	24–29	21–20
5	(Norway) Elverum Håndball	10	3	1	6	274	289	−15	7		29–30	23–37	27–28	28–28	—	29–23
6	(North Macedonia) Metalurg Skopje	10	2	0	8	219	241	−22	4		21–23	24–25	28–24	21–23	22–19	—

Source: EHF
Rules for classification: Tiebreakers

=== Playoffs ===
The top two teams from Groups C and D contest a playoff to determine the two sides advancing to the knockout phase. The winners of each group will face the runners-up of the other group in a two-legged tie. The first leg will be played on 27–28 February 2016, and the second leg will be played on 5 March 2016.

Team 1	Agg.	Team 2	1st leg	2nd leg
Logroño (Spain)	67–70	(Ukraine) Motor Zaporizhzhia	30–31	37–39
Skjern Håndbold (Denmark)	54–58	(Belarus) Meshkov Brest	31–31	23–27

== Knockout stage ==
The first-place team from the preliminary groups A and B advanced to the quarterfinals, while the second through sixth place teams advanced to the round 16 alongside the playoff winners.

=== Round of 16 ===
Team 1	Agg.	Team 2	1st leg	2nd leg
Motor Zaporizhzhia (Ukraine)	52–70	(Hungary) MVM Veszprém	24–29	28–41
Meshkov Brest (Belarus)	58–65	(Poland) Vive Tauron Kielce	28–32	30–33
Montpellier (France)	57–59	(Germany) Flensburg-Handewitt	27–28	30–31
Wisła Płock (Poland)	54–55	(North Macedonia) Vardar	30–30	24–25
Pick Szeged (Hungary)	62–65	(Germany) THW Kiel	33–29	29–36
Zagreb (Croatia)	54–53	(Germany) Rhein-Neckar Löwen	23–24	31–29

=== Quarterfinals ===
Team 1	Agg.	Team 2	1st leg	2nd leg
Zagreb (Croatia)	52–60	(France) Paris Saint-Germain	20–28	32–32
THW Kiel (Germany)	59–57	(Spain) Barcelona Lassa	29–24	30–33
Vardar (North Macedonia)	56–59	(Hungary) MVM Veszprém	26–29	30–30
Flensburg-Handewitt (Germany)	56–57	(Poland) Vive Tauron Kielce	28–28	28–29

=== Final four ===
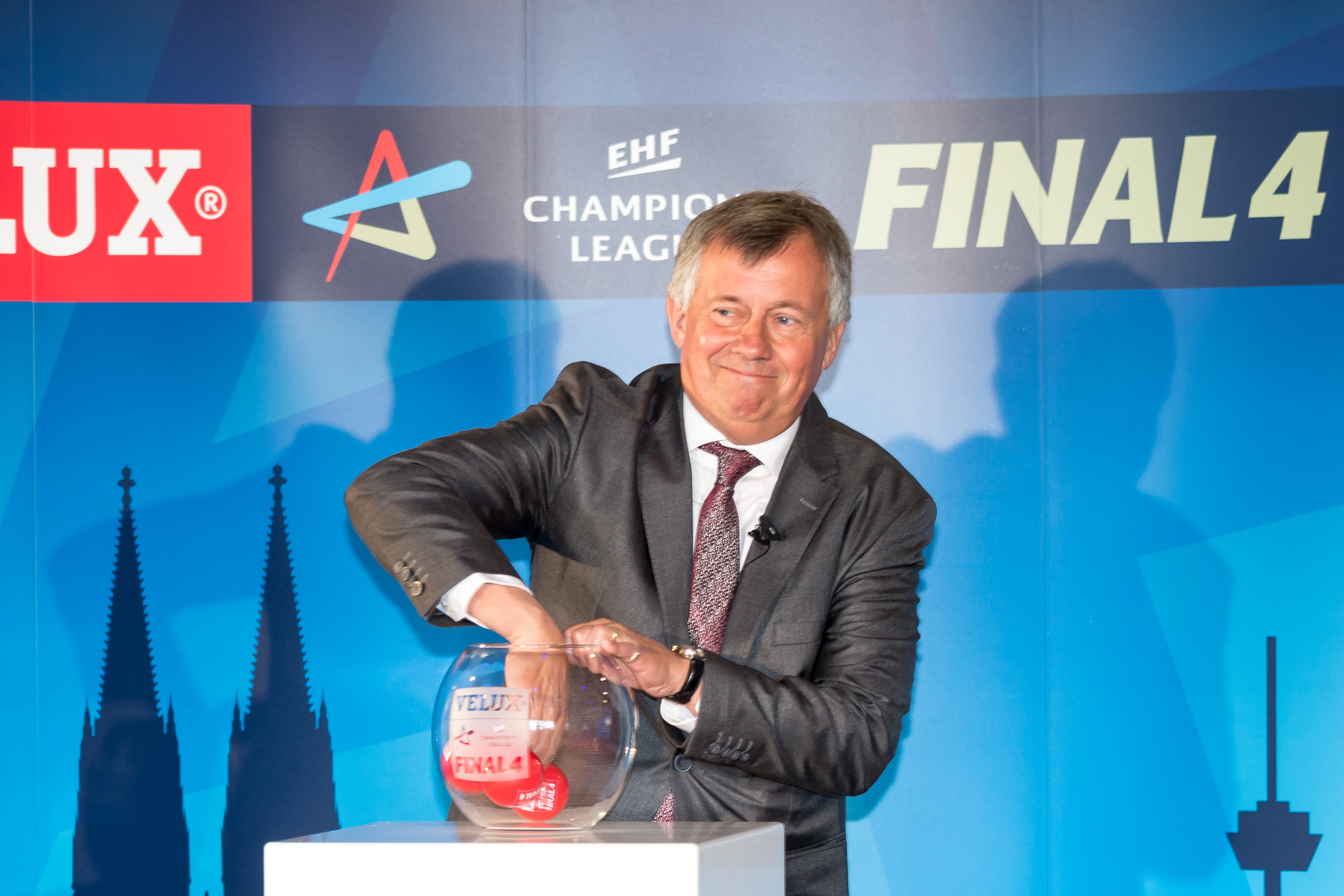
Drawing the final four in May in Cologne

The final four was held at the Lanxess Arena in Cologne, Germany on 28 and 29 May 2016. The draw was held on 3 May 2016 at 12:00.

=== Bracket ===
Semifinals
28 May
(Poland) Vive Tauron Kielce	28
(France) Paris Saint-Germain	26
28 May
(Germany) THW Kiel	28
(Hungary) MVM Veszprém (ET)	31

Final
29 May
(Poland) Vive Tauron Kielce (Pen)	39
(Hungary) MVM Veszprém	38
Third place
29 May
(France) Paris Saint-Germain	29
(Germany) THW Kiel	27

=== Final ===
29 May 2016
18:00
Vive Tauron Kielce (Poland)
39–38 (ET)
(Hungary) MVM Veszprém
Lanxess Arena, Cologne
Attendance: 19,250
Referees: López, Ramírez (ESP)
Reichmann 9
(13–17)
Ilić, Ugalde 6
3× (yellow card) 5× (suspension)
Report
3× (yellow card) 6× (suspension)

FT: 29–29 ET: 6–6 Pen: 4–3

== Top goalscorers ==
Statistics exclude qualifying rounds.

Rank	Player	Team	Goals
1	(Denmark) Mikkel Hansen	(France) Paris Saint-Germain	141
2	(Serbia) Momir Ilić	(Hungary) MVM Veszprém	120
3	(North Macedonia) Kiril Lazarov	(Spain) Barcelona Lassa	109
4	(Serbia) Marko Vujin	(Germany) THW Kiel	103
5	(Slovenia) Dean Bombač	(Hungary) MOL-Pick Szeged	101
6	(Croatia) Domagoj Duvnjak	(Germany) THW Kiel	93
6	(Poland) Michał Jurecki	(Poland) Vive Tauron Kielce	93
8	(Denmark) Anders Eggert	(Germany) Flensburg-Handewitt	90
8	(France) Nikola Karabatić	(France) Paris Saint-Germain	90
8	(Belarus) Barys Pukhouski	(Ukraine) Motor Zaporizhzhia	90

== Awards ==
The All-star team of the Champions League 2015/16:

Position	Player
Goalkeeper	(Denmark) Niklas Landin Jacobsen (THW Kiel)
Right wing	(Slovenia) Gašper Marguč (MVM Veszprém)
Right back	(North Macedonia) Kiril Lazarov (Barcelona Lassa)
Centre back	(Slovenia) Dean Bombač (MOL-Pick Szeged)
Left back	(Serbia) Momir Ilić (MVM Veszprém)
Left wing	(Croatia) Manuel Štrlek (Vive Tauron Kielce)
Pivot	(Serbia) Rastko Stojković (HC Meshkov Brest)
Best defender	(Hungary) Timuzsin Schuch (MVM Veszprém)
Best coach	(Spain) Xavi Sabaté (MVM Veszprém)

Best Coach: (Spain) Xavi Sabaté

== See also ==
- 2015–16 EHF Cup
- 2015–16 EHF Challenge Cup
