= Siarhei Rutenka =

Belarusian handball player (born 1981)

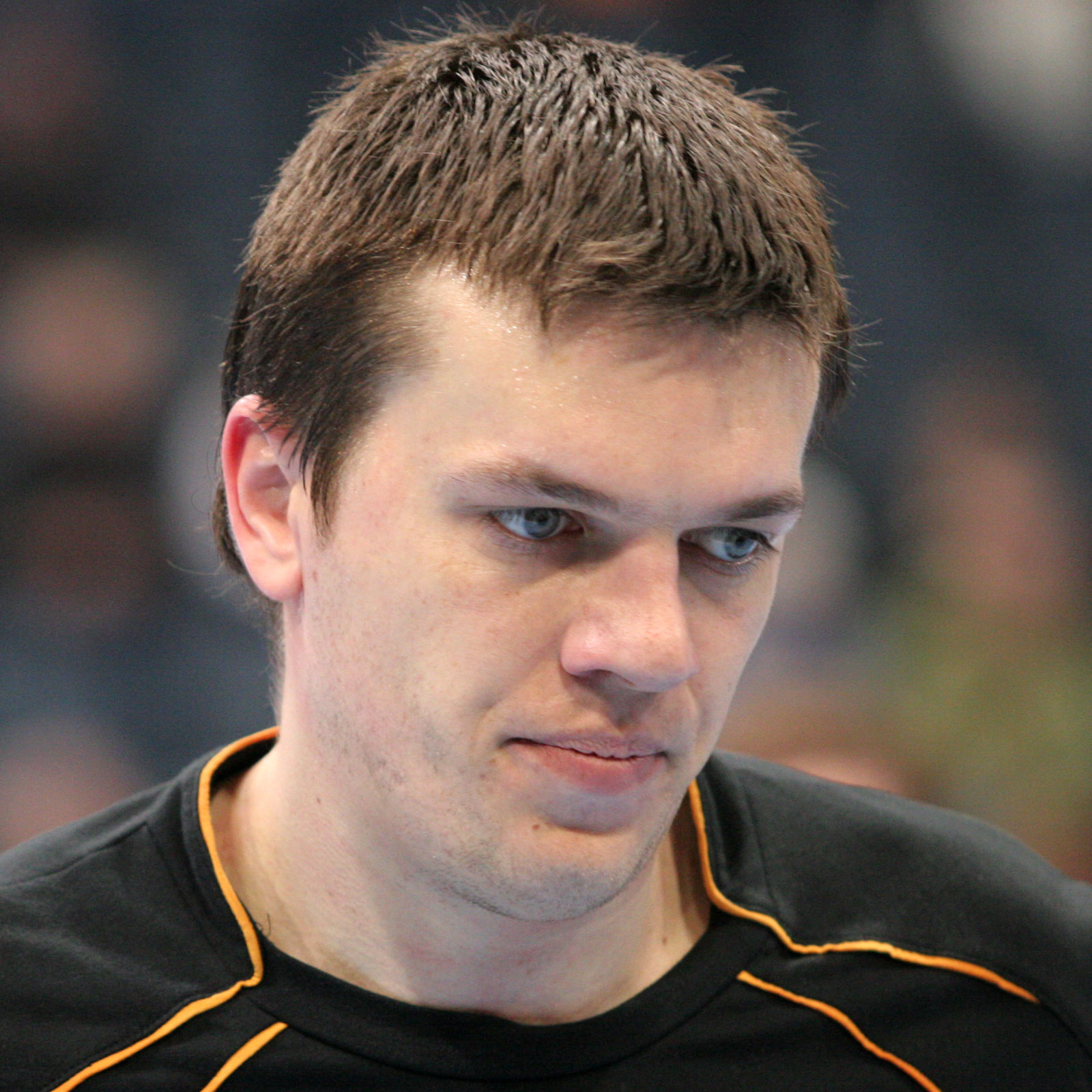

Personal information
- Nationality: Belarusian, Slovenian, Spanish
- Born: 29 August 1981 (age 45) Minsk, Soviet Union
- Height: 1.98 m (6 ft 6 in)

Sport
- Sport: Handball
- Position: Left back

Senior clubs
- Years: Team
- 1998–2000: Arkatron Minsk
- 2000–2001: RK Gorenje
- 2001–2005: RK Celje
- 2005–2009: BM Ciudad Real
- 2009–2015: FC Barcelona
- 2015: Lekhwiya SC
- 2016: SKA Minsk
National team
Years	Team	Apps	(Gls)
2001	Belarus	7	(23)
2004–2007	Slovenia	56	(308)
2010–2016	Belarus	72	(484)

Siarhei Rutenka, also Sergej Rutenka (Belarusian: Сяргей Рутэнка; born 29 September 1981) is a Belarusian former professional handball player. Besides Belarusian citizenship, he also acquired Slovenian citizenship in 2003. In January 2008, he received the Spanish nationality. His preferred position was outside left, but he was also capable of playing as the pivot and playmaker. He came to prominence while playing for the Slovenian club RK Celje and earlier for RK Gorenje. He has also played for FC Barcelona in Spain. The club acquired him for €1 million in 2009.

Rutenka was the top goalscorer at the 2006 European Men's Handball Championship, representing Slovenia. In 2013, he was elected best left-back of the year.

He was included in the European Handball Federation Hall of Fame in 2023.

He is the older brother of handball player Dzianis Rutenka.
