= Tobias Reichmann =

German handball player (born 1988)

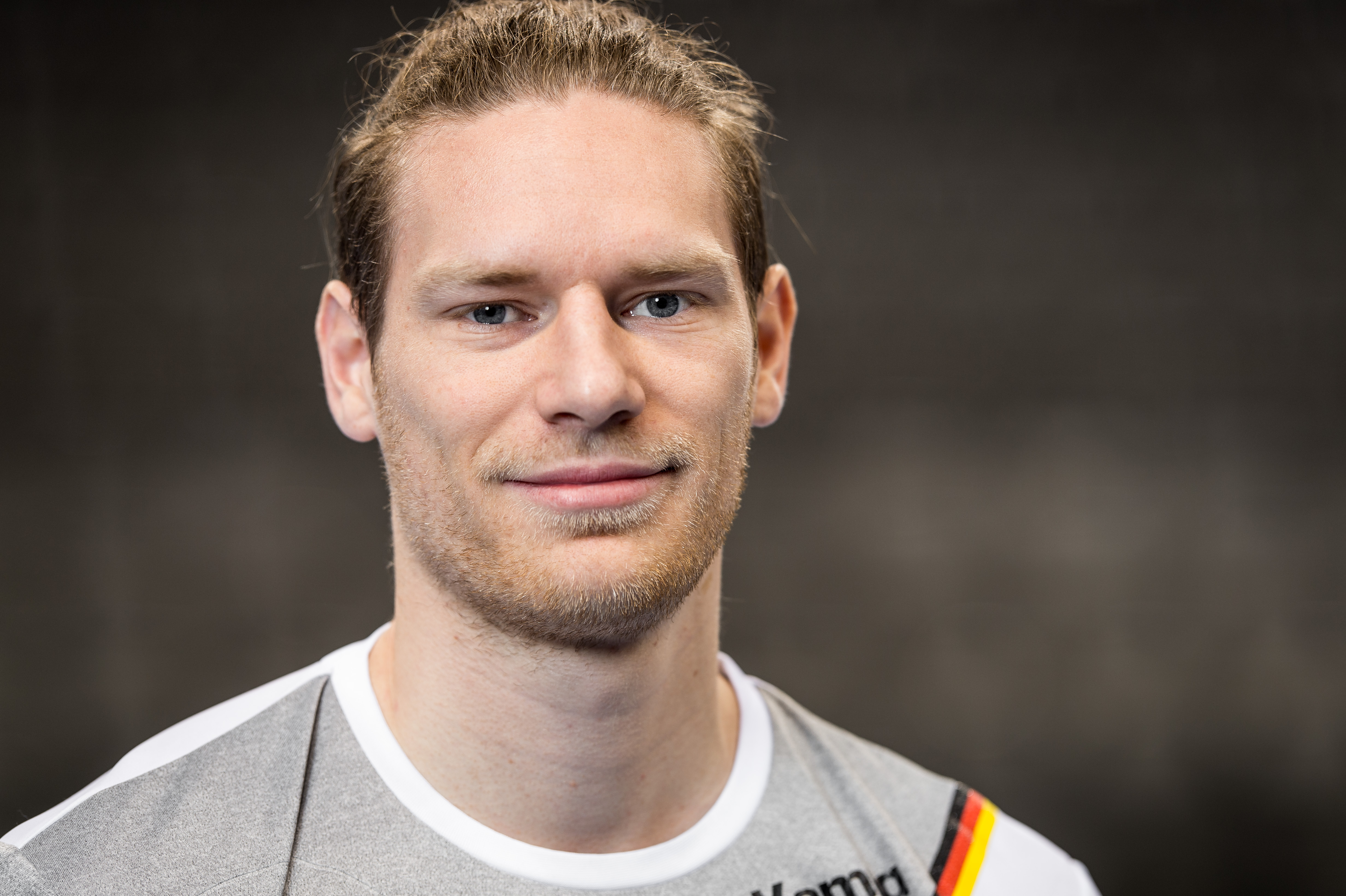
- Reichmann in 2018

Personal information
- Nationality: German
- Born: 27 May 1988 (age 38) East Berlin, East Germany
- Height: 1.88 m (6 ft 2 in)

Sport
- Sport: Handball
- Position: Right wing
- Number: 27

Senior clubs
- Years: Team
- 2004–2008: LHC Cottbus
- 2008–2009: SC Magdeburg
- 2009–2012: THW Kiel
- 2012–2014: HSG Wetzlar
- 2014–2017: Vive Kielce
- 2017–2022: MT Melsungen
- 2022–2023: TV Emsdetten
- 2024: Rhein-Neckar Löwen
- 2024: Füchse Berlin
National team
Years	Team	Apps	(Gls)
2012–2021	Germany	106	(291)
Medal record
Olympic Games
Bronze medal – third place	2016 Rio de Janeiro	Team
European Championship
Gold medal – first place	2016 Poland
- Updated on 24 January 2024

Tobias Reichmann (born 27 May 1988) is a retired German handball player.

== Club career ==
Reichmann started playing at senior level at the age of 16 for LHC Cottbus in the Regionalliga. In 2007 he was promoted with the club to the 2. Bundesliga. The following season, they came however last, despite Reichmann scoring 179 goals in the season.

The following season he went to the second team of SC Magdeburg. In the 2009/2010 he switched to First Bundesliga team THW Kiel. Here he won the Bundesliga and the EHF Champions League in his first season.

== National team ==
He debuted for the national team in 2012 against Serbia. In 2016 he was part of the German team that won the 2016 European Championship. At the 2016 Olympics he won bronze medals with the German team, for which he was awarded the Silbernes Lorbeerblatt.

== Achievements ==
- Summer Olympics:
  - Bronze: 2016
- European Championship:
  - Gold: 2016
- EHF Champions League:
  - Gold: 2010, 2012, 2016
- IHF Super Globe:
  - Gold: 2011
- National Championship of Germany:
  - Gold: 2010, 2012
- National Cup of Germany:
  - Gold: 2010, 2011
- German Super Cup:
  - Gold: 2011

== Individual awards ==
- All-Star Right wing of the European Championship: 2016
