= Belarus men's national handball team =

Belarus

Information
- Association: Handball Federation of Belarus
- Coach: Yuri Shevtsov
- Assistant coach: Dzmitry Nikulenkau

Colours
1st	2nd

Results

World Championship
- Appearances: 5 (First in 1995)
- Best result: 9th (1995)

European Championship
- Appearances: 7 (First in 1994)
- Best result: 8th (1994)
- Last updated on Unknown.

The Belarus national handball team is the national handball team of Belarus.

In light of the launching of the 2022 Russian invasion of Ukraine, the European Handball Federation in February 2022 suspended Belarus both in competitions for national teams and on the club level. The International Handball Federation banned Belarus athletes and officials. Referees, officials, and commission members from Belarus will not be called upon for future activities.

== Competitive record ==
=== World Championship ===
World Championship record
Year	Round	Position	GP	W	D	L	GS	GA
(Sweden) 1993	did not qualify							
(Iceland) 1995	9/10th place	9	9	5	0	4	278	247
(Japan) 1997	did not qualify							
(Egypt) 1999	did not qualify							
(France) 2001	did not qualify							
(Portugal) 2003	did not qualify							
(Tunisia) 2005	did not qualify							
(Germany) 2007	did not qualify							
(Croatia) 2009	did not qualify							
(Sweden) 2011	did not qualify							
(Spain) 2013	Round of 16	15	6	2	0	4	159	153
(Qatar) 2015	17/18th place	18	7	2	1	4	215	216
(France) 2017	Round of 16	11	6	2	0	4	156	186
(Denmark) / (Germany) 2019	did not qualify							
(Egypt) 2021	Main round	17	6	2	2	2	171	172
(Poland) / (Sweden) 2023	Disqualified of the qualification because of the Russo-Ukrainian War							
(Croatia) / (Denmark) / (Norway) 2025	Disqualified of the qualification because of the Russo-Ukrainian War							
(Germany) 2027	to be determined							
(France) / (Germany) 2029	to be determined							
(Denmark) / (Iceland) / (Norway) 2031	to be determined							
Total	5/20	–	34	13	3	18	979	974

=== European Championship ===
European Championship record
Year	Round	Position	GP	W	D	L	GS	GA
(Portugal) 1994	7th/8th place	8	6	2	0	4	154	167
(Spain) 1996	did not qualify							
(Italy) 1998	did not qualify							
(Croatia) 2000	did not qualify							
(Sweden) 2002	did not qualify							
(Slovenia) 2004	did not qualify							
(Switzerland) 2006	did not qualify							
(Norway) 2008	Preliminary round	15	3	0	0	3	83	101
(Austria) 2010	did not qualify							
(Serbia) 2012	did not qualify							
(Denmark) 2014	Main round	12	6	1	0	5	166	195
(Poland) 2016	Main round	10	6	2	0	4	167	189
(Croatia) 2018	Main round	10	6	2	0	4	155	172
(Austria) (Norway) (Sweden) 2020	Main round	10	7	3	1	3	209	217
(Hungary) (Slovakia) 2022	Preliminary round	17	3	1	0	2	78	88
(Germany) 2024	Disqualified during qualification							
(Denmark) (Norway) (Sweden) 2026	Disqualified during qualification							
(Portugal) (Spain) (Switzerland) 2028	To be determined							
(Czech Republic) (Denmark) (Poland) 2030	To be determined							
(France) (Germany) 2032	To be determined							
Total	7/20	–	37	11	1	25	1012	1129

* Colored background indicates that medal was won on the tournament.
** Red border color indicates that tournament was held on home soil.

== Current squad ==
This is the list of players named for the friendly tournament in January, 2026.

Nr.	Name	Position	Club
16	Viachaslau Saldatsenka	Goalkeeper	(Serbia) RK Vojvodina
88	Kanstantin Kavaliou	Goalkeeper	(Belarus) SKA Minsk
97	Ihar Chernikau	Goalkeeper	(Israel) Bnei Herzliya
23	Andrey Yurynok	Left wing	(Belarus) HC Meshkov Brest
78	Stanislav Sadouski	Left wing	(Croatia) RK Zagreb
14	Yauheni Nikanovich	Right wing	(Russia) Saint Petersburg HC
2	Dzmitry Khmialkou	Left back	(Russia) Saint Petersburg HC
3	Uladzislau Kulesh	Left back	(Germany) MT Melsungen
21	Kiryl Samoila	Left back	(Poland) Wisła Płock
8	Artur Rudz	Playmaker	(Belarus) HC Meshkov Brest
47	Ihar Belyavski	Playmaker	(Croatia) RK Zagreb
77	Yulian Hiryk	Playmaker	(Russia) HBC CSKA Moscow
9	Aleh Astrashapkin	Right back	(Russia) Saint Petersburg HC
98	Mikalai Aliokhin	Right back	(Belarus) HC Meshkov Brest
99	Pavel Duda	Right back	(Belarus) HC Masheka Mogilev
4	Matvei Barbashinski	Pivot	(Belarus) SKA Minsk
27	Mikita Pliuto	Pivot	(Germany) HSG Konstanz
50	Artsem Karalek	Pivot	(Poland) KS Kielce
74	Viachaslau Bokhan	Pivot	(Russia) Saint Petersburg HC

=== Statistics ===
Most Appearances
Name	Matches	Position
Barys Pukhouski	209	CB
Ivan Brouka	207	W
Aliaksandr Tsitou	178	P
Siarhei Shylovich	157	OB
Maksim Baranau	154	W
Maxim Babichev	161	P
Dzianis Rutenka	126	W
Dzmitry Nikulenkau	119	CB
Maxim Nekhaychik	107	
Andrej Klimovets	101	P
Yuri Gromyko	98	P
Andrey Sinak	98	
Artsem Karalek	94	P
Uladzislau Kulesh	92	OB

Top Scorers
Name	Goals	Average	Position
Barys Pukhouski	867		CB
Ivan Brouka	607		W
Siarhei Rutenka	507	6.42	OB, CB, P
Siarhei Shylovich	495		OB
Maksim Baranau	368		W
Uladzislau Kulesh	353		OB
Mikita Vailupau	353		W
Artsem Karalek	344		P
Andrej Kurchev	340	4.53	OB, CB
Andrej Klimovets	328	3.25	P
Dzianis Rutenka	306		W

Top Average Scorers (goals < 300 & avg > 3.5)
Name	Goals	Average	Position
Mikhail Yakimovich	231	5.63	OB
Andrej Paraschenko	194	4.85	
Aleksandr Tuchkin	48	4.80	
Aleksej Orlov	129	4.61	
Sergei Gorbok	193	4.60	OB
Gennadij Chalepo	286	4.27	OB
Alex Bärbel	255	3.81	
Andrey Modrica	277		
Mihail Usachev	220		
Sergej Ubozhenko	206		

== Notable players ==
- Sergei Gorbok (later Russia)
- Andrej Klimovets (later Germany)
- Siarhei Rutenka (interim Slovenia)
- Aleksandr Tuchkin (later Russia)
- Mikhail Yakimovich
- Konstantin Sharovarov
