= Matevž Skok =

Slovenian handball player

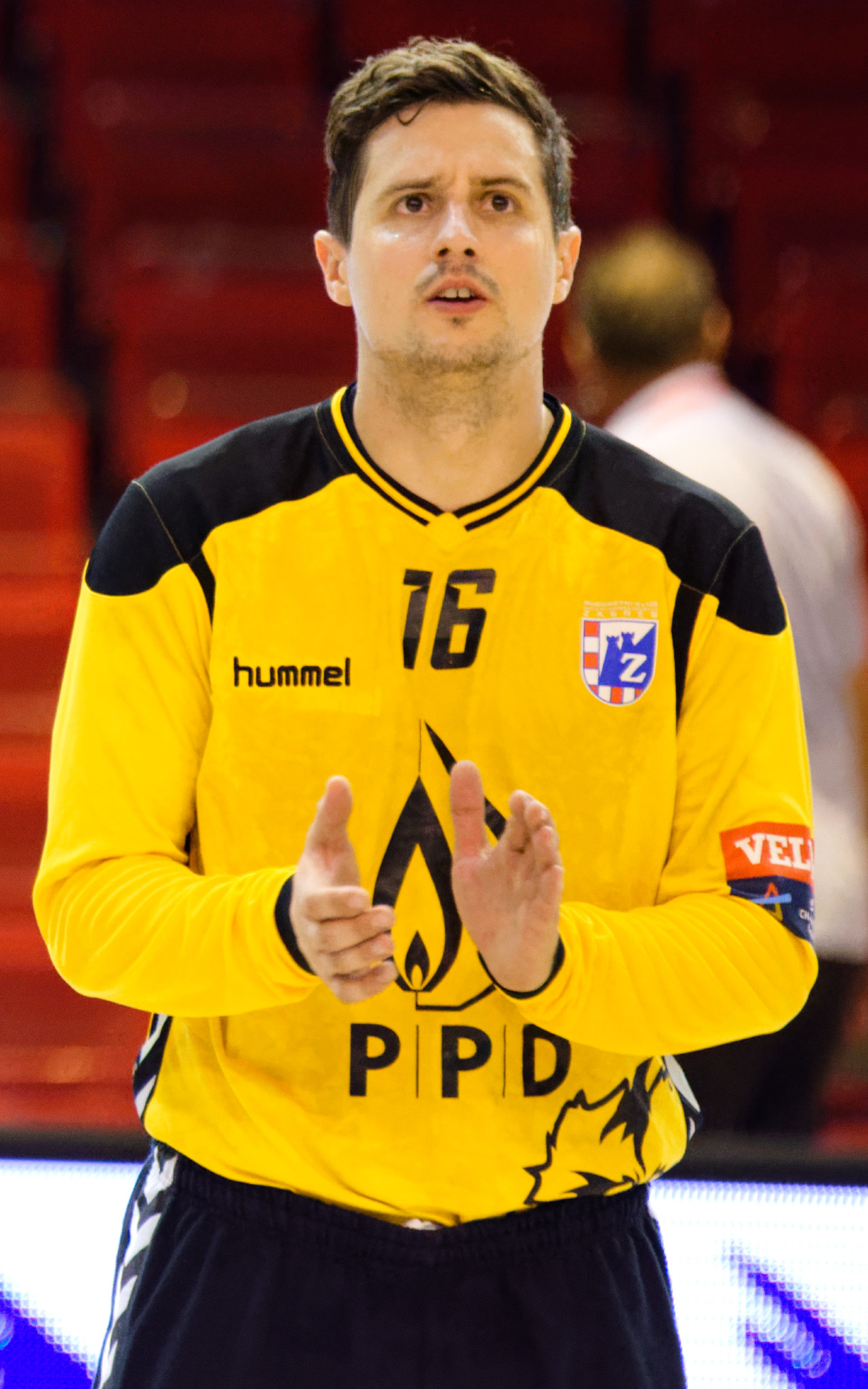

Personal information
- Nationality: Slovenian
- Born: 2 September 1986 (age 40) Celje, SFR Yugoslavia
- Height: 1.88 m (6 ft 2 in)

Sport
- Sport: Handball
- Position: Goalkeeper
- Current club: RK Gorenje Velenje
- Number: 1

Senior clubs
- Years: Team
- 2001–2011: RK Gorenje Velenje
- 2011–2015: RK Celje
- 2015–2016: TuS N-Lübbecke
- 2016–2017: RK Zagreb
- 2018–2022: Sporting CP
- 2022–: RK Gorenje Velenje
National team
Years	Team	Apps	(Gls)
–	Slovenia	87	(2)
Medal record
World Championship
Bronze medal – third place	2017 France

Matevž Skok (born 2 September 1986) is a Slovenian handball player for RK Gorenje Velenje and the Slovenian national team.

At the 2017 World Championship he won a bronze medal, which is Slovenias best ever result at a World Championship. This was Slovenias second ever medals and first since 2004. He also represented Slovenia at the 2018 European Championship.
