= Dzianis Rutenka =

Belarusian handball player

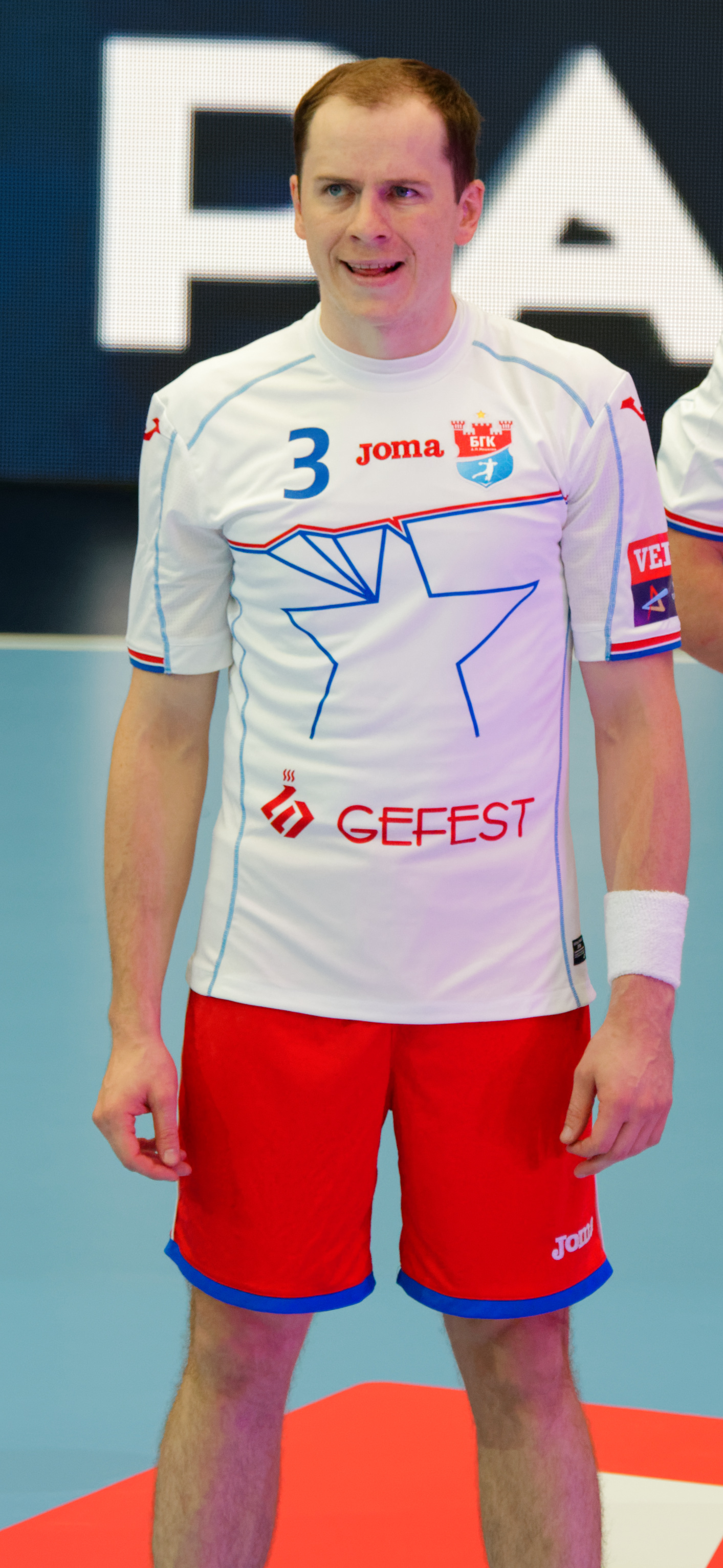

Personal information
- Nationality: Belarusian
- Born: 14 February 1986 (age 40) Minsk, Soviet Union
- Height: 1.86 m (6 ft 1 in)

Sport
- Sport: Handball
- Position: Right wing
- Current club: Meshkov Brest
- Number: 3
National team
Years	Team	Apps	(Gls)
–	Belarus	112	(283)

Dzianis Rutenka (Belarusian: Дзяніс Рутэнка; born 14 February 1986) is a Belarusian handball player for Meshkov Brest and the Belarusian national team.

He is the younger brother of Siarhei Rutenka.
