= Raúl Entrerríos =

Spanish handball player (born 1981)

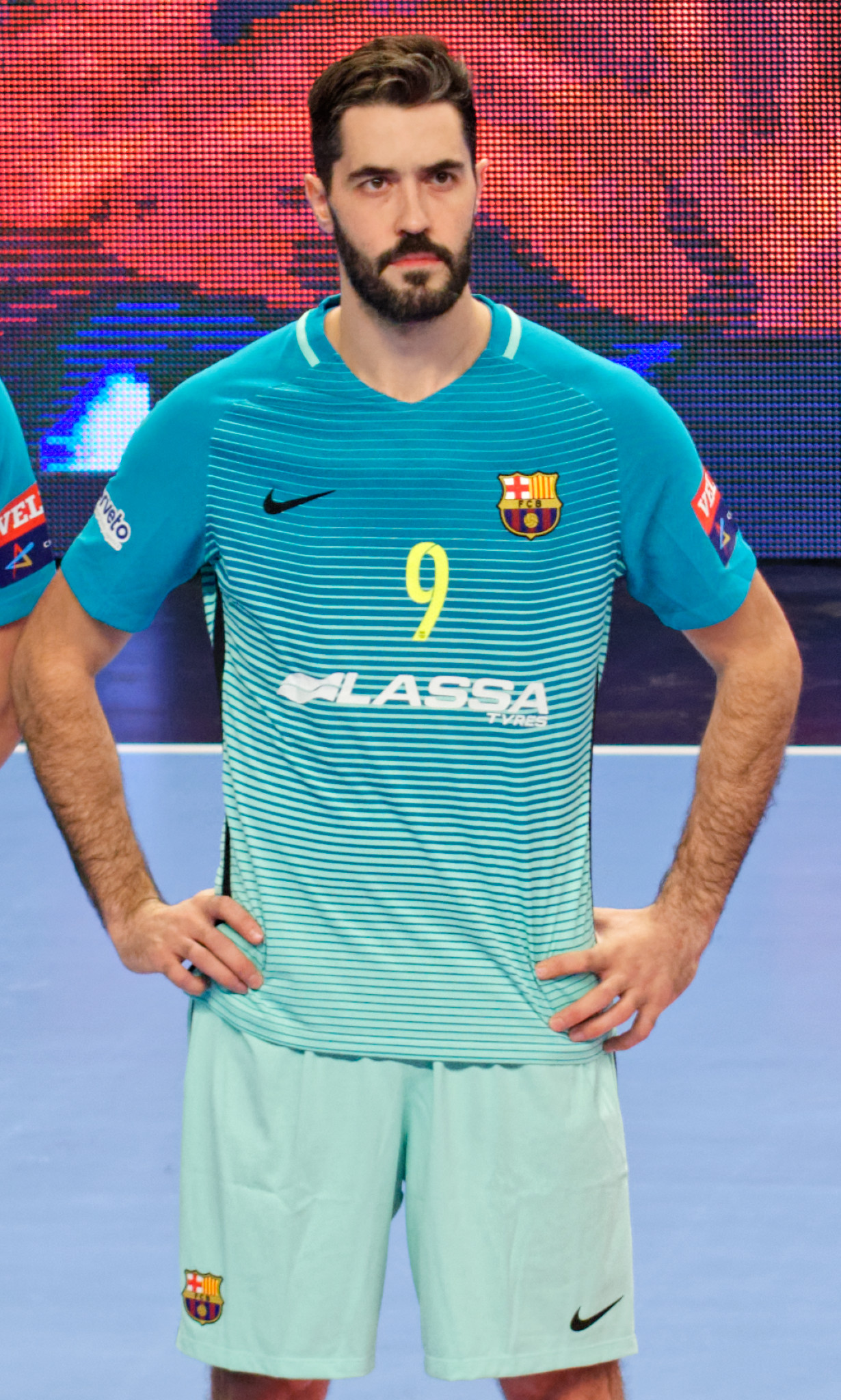
- Entrerrios in 2016

Personal information
- Full name: Raúl Entrerríos Rodríguez
- Born: 12 February 1981 (age 45) Gijón, Spain
- Height: 1.95 m (6 ft 5 in)

Sport
- Sport: Handball
- Position: Centre back

Senior clubs
- Years: Team
- –2001: Grupo Covadonga
- 2001–2007: Ademar León
- 2007–2010: BM Valladolid
- 2010–2021: FC Barcelona
National team
Years	Team	Apps	(Gls)
2002–2021	Spain	294	(681)

Teams managed
- 2021–2024: FC Barcelona (U18)
- 2025–: Spain (youth)
Medal record
Olympic Games
Bronze medal – third place	2008 Beijing	Team
Bronze medal – third place	2020 Tokyo	Team
World Championship
Gold medal – first place	2005 Tunisia
Bronze medal – third place	2011 Sweden
Bronze medal – third place	2021 Egypt
European Championship
Gold medal – first place	2018 Croatia
Gold medal – first place	2020 Sweden/Austria/Norway
Silver medal – second place	2016 Poland
Silver medal – second place	2006 Switzerland
Bronze medal – third place	2014 Denmark

Raúl Entrerríos Rodríguez (born 12 February 1981) is a former Spanish handball player and current handball coach. He is the most capped player on the Spanish national team and he is a world champion from 2005 and a European Champion from 2020.

His older brother Alberto Entrerríos is a Spanish international handball player.

== Career ==
He started his career at Grupo Covadonga, where he played until 2001, where he joined CB Ademar León. Here he won the 2002 Copa del Rey and the 2005 EHF Cup Winners' Cup.

In 2007 he joined local rivals BM Valladolid, where he won the Cup Winners' Cup for a second time in 2009.

In 2010 he joined FC Barcelona. Here he won the Spanish Championship and Champions League in his first season. He followed it up by winning the Spanish Championship every season from 2012 to 2021, as well as the Supercopa ASOBAL, Copa ASOBAL and the 2015 and 2020-21 EHF Champions League.

In 2021, he ended his club career and from the summer of 2021, and became a coach for FC Barcelona's U18-team. In total he played 553 games in the top Spanish league, scoring 1585 goals over 20 seasons.

=== National team ===
In 1998 and 1999 he played 10 games for the Spanish youth team. He finished second with Spain at the 1999 European Men's U-18 Handball Championship.

He made his debut for the Spanish national team on 27 July 2003 against Slovenia. At the 2005 World Men's Handball Championship he won gold medals, which was the first time Spain won the title. A year later he won silver medals that 2006 European Men's Handball Championship. He participated at the 2008 Summer Olympics in Beijing, where the team won a bronze medal, defeating Croatia 35–29.

At the 2011 World Men's Handball Championship he won bronze medals, losing to Denmark in the semifinal and beating Sweden in the bronze match. At the 2012 Olympics he represented Spain, where they went out against France in the quarter final.

He missed the 2013 World Men's Handball Championship due to injury.

He was back in the Spanish team again for the 2014 European Men's Handball Championship, where Spain won bronze medals. They lost to France in the semifinal and beat Croatia in the third place playoff.

He also represented Spain at the 2015 World Men's Handball Championship.

He won a gold medal at the 2020 European Men's Handball Championship.

In March 2021 he played his 281st game for Spain, which made him the most capped Spanish player ever, taking the record from David Barrufet. Later the same year he won bronze medals at the 2021 Olympics. In the last match of his career, he scored the deciding goal to 33–31 against Egypt with 7 seconds left to win the bronze medals.

== Titles ==
=== Club ===
Ademar León

- Copa del Rey: 2002
- EHF Cup Winners' Cup: 2005

C. B. Valladolid

- EHF Cup Winners' Cup: 2009

F. C. Barcelona

- 3 EHF Champions League: 2010-11, 2014-15, 2020-21
- 11 Liga ASOBAL: 2010-11, 2011-12, 2012-13, 2013-14, 2014-15, 2015-16, 2016-17, 2017-18, 2018-19, 2019-20, 2020-21
- 8 Copa del Rey: 2014, 2015, 2016, 2017, 2018, 2019, 2020, 2021
- 11 Copa ASOBAL: 2011, 2012, 2013, 2014, 2015, 2016, 2017, 2018, 2019, 2020, 2021
- 9 Supercopa ASOBAL: 2012/13, 2013/14, 2014/15, 2015/16, 2016/17, 2017/18, 2018/19, 2019/20, 2020/21
- 5 IHF Super Globe 2013, 2014, 2017, 2018, 2019
