= SKA Minsk =

Belarusian handball club

- Full name: Sportiwny Klub Armii Minsk
- Founded: 1976; 50 years ago
- Arena: Arena Uruchie
- Capacity: 3,000
- President: Andrei Krainov
- Head coach: Dzmitry Nikulenkau
- League: Belarusian Men's Handball Championship
- 2025/2026: 2nd

SKA Minsk (Спортивный Клуб Армии (СКА Минск)) is a team handball club from Minsk, Belarus, which competes in the Belarusian First League of Handball and SEHA League.

They are one of the biggest and most successful teams in Belarus, and was as well one of the most successful teams in the Soviet Union.

== Accomplishments ==
=== National competitions ===
- Belarusian First League of Handball:
  - Champion (11): 1993, 1994, 1995, 1996, 1997, 1998, 1999, 2000, 2001, 2002, 2025
- Soviet Men's Handball Championship
  - Champion (6): 1981, 1984, 1985, 1986, 1988, 1989

=== International competitions ===
- European Champion Clubs' Cup:
  - Winner (3): 1987, 1989, 1990
- Cup Winner's Cup:
  - Winner (2): 1983, 1988
- IHF Cup:
  - Runners-up (1): 1992
- EHF Challenge Cup:
  - Winner (1): 2013
- IHF Supercup
  - Runners-up (1): 1983

== Team ==
Squad for the 2025–26 season

Вратари

1 Колос Кирилл

23 Ковалёв Константин

34 Шульга Никита

Крайние

18 Царев Максим

52 Лукашенок Антон

55 Немков Павел

75 Лабор Евгений

78 Ладутько Евгений

Полусредние

22 Дмитрий Камышик

29 Эльметнави Хани

44 Рабчинский Кирилл

69 Петрович Александр

98 Алексей Ермаков

Разыгрывающие

5 Зинейкин Иван

10 Баранчик Тимофей

17 Подшивалов Александр

89 Карпилович Дмитрий

Линейные

4 Барбашинский Матвей

24 Покрышко Захар

25 Матвеенко Дмитрий

=== Transfers ===
Transfers for the 2026–27 season

Joining

- (Belarus) Pavel Niamkou (LW) (back from loan (Russia) Chekhovskiye Medvedi)

Leaving

- (Belarus) Kirill Rabchinski (LB) to (Poland) Industria Kielce
- (Belarus) Matvei Barbashinski (LP) to (Croatia) RK Zagreb
- (Belarus) Alexey Ermakov (LB) (to (Russia) Chekhovskiye Medvedi) ?
- (Belarus) Timafey Baranchyk (CB)(to (Russia) HBC CSKA Moscow) ?

=== Transfer History ===
Transfers for the 2025–26 season

Joining

- (Belarus) Aliaksandr Padshyvalau (CB) (from (Belarus) HC Meshkov Brest)

Leaving

- (Belarus) Stanislau Sadouski (LW) to (Croatia) RK Zagreb
- (Belarus) Matsvei Udavenia (RB) (to ?)
