= 2014–15 EHF Champions League group stage =

This article describes the group stage of the 2014–15 EHF Champions League.

== Format ==
24 teams were drawn into four groups of six teams, where they played each other twice. The top four teams advanced to the knockout stage. The draw took place on 27 June 2014, at 18:00 local time, in Vienna, Austria.

== Seedings ==
The seedings were published on 23 June 2014.

Pot 1	Pot 2	Pot 3	Pot 4	Pot 5	Pot 6
(Germany) THW Kiel (Spain) Barcelona (Hungary) MKB-MVM Veszprém (Poland) Vive Tauron Kielce	(Denmark) KIF Kolding (North Macedonia) RK Metalurg (Slovenia) RK Celje (France) Dunkerque	(Croatia) RK Zagreb (Russia) Medvedi (Switzerland) Schaffhausen (Sweden) Alingsås HK	(Germany) RN Löwen (Spain) CB Logroño (Hungary) MOL-Pick Szeged (Poland) Wisła Płock	(Germany) Flensburg (Denmark) Aalborg (North Macedonia) RK Vardar (France) Paris SG	(France) Montpellier (Belarus) HC Brest (Ukraine) Zaporizhzhia (Turkey) Beşiktaş J.K.

Key to colours in group tables
Top four placed teams advanced to the last 16

== Group A ==
Team	Pld	W	D	L	GF	GA	GD	Pts
(Germany) THW Kiel	10	9	0	1	322	259	+63	18
(France) Paris Saint-Germain	10	6	0	4	297	266	+31	12
(Croatia) Zagreb	10	6	0	4	241	248	−7	12
(Spain) Logroño	10	4	1	5	305	305	0	9
(Belarus) Meshkov Brest	10	2	2	6	267	293	−26	6
(North Macedonia) Metalurg Skopje	10	1	1	8	233	294	−61	3

28 September 2014; 19:00	Metalurg Skopje (North Macedonia)	22–27	(France) Paris Saint-Germain	Boris Trajkovski Sports Center, Skopje; Attendance: 6,963; Referees: Caçador, Nicolau (POR)
28 September 2014; 19:00	Mirkulovski 5	(11–11)	Hansen 6	Boris Trajkovski Sports Center, Skopje; Attendance: 6,963; Referees: Caçador, Nicolau (POR)
28 September 2014; 19:00	3× (yellow card) 2× (suspension)	Report	3× (yellow card) 2× (suspension)	Boris Trajkovski Sports Center, Skopje; Attendance: 6,963; Referees: Caçador, Nicolau (POR)

28 September 2014; 19:00	Logroño (Spain)	39–31	(Belarus) Meshkov Brest	Palacio de los Deportes de La Rioja, Logroño; Attendance: 2,500; Referees: Leszczynski, Piechota (POL)
28 September 2014; 19:00	García 8	(20–14)	Stojković 9	Palacio de los Deportes de La Rioja, Logroño; Attendance: 2,500; Referees: Leszczynski, Piechota (POL)
28 September 2014; 19:00	3× (yellow card) 2× (suspension)	Report	3× (yellow card) 3× (suspension)	Palacio de los Deportes de La Rioja, Logroño; Attendance: 2,500; Referees: Leszczynski, Piechota (POL)

28 September 2014; 19:30	Zagreb (Croatia)	27–25	(Germany) THW Kiel	Arena Zagreb, Zagreb; Attendance: 11,000; Referees: Togstad, Kristiansen (NOR)
28 September 2014; 19:30	Horvat, Obranović 6	(9–13)	three players 4	Arena Zagreb, Zagreb; Attendance: 11,000; Referees: Togstad, Kristiansen (NOR)
28 September 2014; 19:30	3× (yellow card) 3× (suspension)	Report	3× (yellow card) 1× (suspension)	Arena Zagreb, Zagreb; Attendance: 11,000; Referees: Togstad, Kristiansen (NOR)

2 October 2014; 19:30	THW Kiel (Germany)	34–32	(Spain) Logroño	Sparkassen-Arena, Kiel; Attendance: 8,000; Referees: Pavićević, Ražnatović (MNE)
2 October 2014; 19:30	Pálmarsson 12	(20–16)	García, Rocas 7	Sparkassen-Arena, Kiel; Attendance: 8,000; Referees: Pavićević, Ražnatović (MNE)
2 October 2014; 19:30	3× (yellow card) 2× (suspension)	Report	2× (yellow card) 2× (suspension)	Sparkassen-Arena, Kiel; Attendance: 8,000; Referees: Pavićević, Ražnatović (MNE)

4 October 2014; 18:00	Meshkov Brest (Belarus)	28–24	(North Macedonia) Metalurg Skopje	Universal Sportcomplex Victoria, Brest; Attendance: 2,500; Referees: Dobrovits, Tájok (HUN)
4 October 2014; 18:00	Nikulenkau 5	(12–10)	Cindrić 9	Universal Sportcomplex Victoria, Brest; Attendance: 2,500; Referees: Dobrovits, Tájok (HUN)
4 October 2014; 18:00	2× (yellow card) 4× (suspension) 1× (red card)	Report	2× (yellow card) 2× (suspension) 1× (red card)	Universal Sportcomplex Victoria, Brest; Attendance: 2,500; Referees: Dobrovits, Tájok (HUN)

5 October 2014; 19:00	Paris Saint-Germain (France)	27–22	(Croatia) Zagreb	Stade Pierre de Coubertin, Paris; Attendance: 3,500; Referees: Gjeding, Hansen (DEN)
5 October 2014; 19:00	Hansen 8	(11–9)	Stepančić 7	Stade Pierre de Coubertin, Paris; Attendance: 3,500; Referees: Gjeding, Hansen (DEN)
5 October 2014; 19:00	3× (yellow card) 3× (suspension)	Report	3× (yellow card) 5× (suspension)	Stade Pierre de Coubertin, Paris; Attendance: 3,500; Referees: Gjeding, Hansen (DEN)

9 October 2014; 20:30	Meshkov Brest (Belarus)	24–25	(Germany) THW Kiel	Universal Sportcomplex Victoria, Brest; Attendance: 3,500; Referees: Kurtagic, Wetterwik (SWE)
9 October 2014; 20:30	Babichev 4	(11–11)	Vujin 6	Universal Sportcomplex Victoria, Brest; Attendance: 3,500; Referees: Kurtagic, Wetterwik (SWE)
9 October 2014; 20:30	3× (yellow card) 4× (suspension)	Report	2× (yellow card) 2× (suspension)	Universal Sportcomplex Victoria, Brest; Attendance: 3,500; Referees: Kurtagic, Wetterwik (SWE)

11 October 2014; 18:00	Zagreb (Croatia)	19–17	(North Macedonia) Metalurg Skopje	Arena Zagreb, Zagreb; Attendance: 9,500; Referees: Krstić, Ljubić (SLO)
11 October 2014; 18:00	Horvat 9	(10–8)	Cindrić 4	Arena Zagreb, Zagreb; Attendance: 9,500; Referees: Krstić, Ljubić (SLO)
11 October 2014; 18:00	3× (yellow card) 4× (suspension)	Report	3× (yellow card) 4× (suspension)	Arena Zagreb, Zagreb; Attendance: 9,500; Referees: Krstić, Ljubić (SLO)

12 October 2014; 17:00	Paris Saint-Germain (France)	32–25	(Spain) Logroño	Stade Pierre de Coubertin, Paris; Attendance: 2,000; Referees: Baďura, Ondogrecula (SVK)
12 October 2014; 17:00	Narcisse 5	(18–9)	Fernández 8	Stade Pierre de Coubertin, Paris; Attendance: 2,000; Referees: Baďura, Ondogrecula (SVK)
12 October 2014; 17:00	2× (yellow card) 1× (suspension)	Report	3× (yellow card) 1× (suspension)	Stade Pierre de Coubertin, Paris; Attendance: 2,000; Referees: Baďura, Ondogrecula (SVK)

18 October 2014; 18:00	Logroño (Spain)	22–21	(Croatia) Zagreb	Palacio de los Deportes de La Rioja, Logroño; Attendance: 2,100; Referees: Stark, Stefan (ROU)
18 October 2014; 18:00	Rocas 7	(9–12)	Pavlović 5	Palacio de los Deportes de La Rioja, Logroño; Attendance: 2,100; Referees: Stark, Stefan (ROU)
18 October 2014; 18:00	2× (yellow card) 4× (suspension)	Report	3× (yellow card) 7× (suspension)	Palacio de los Deportes de La Rioja, Logroño; Attendance: 2,100; Referees: Stark, Stefan (ROU)

18 October 2014; 21:00	Metalurg Skopje (North Macedonia)	27–42	(Germany) THW Kiel	Boris Trajkovski Sports Center, Skopje; Attendance: 6,500; Referees: Horváth, Márton (HUN)
18 October 2014; 21:00	Dimovski 6	(15–22)	Duvnjak 8	Boris Trajkovski Sports Center, Skopje; Attendance: 6,500; Referees: Horváth, Márton (HUN)
18 October 2014; 21:00	2× (yellow card) 3× (suspension)	Report	3× (yellow card) 2× (suspension)	Boris Trajkovski Sports Center, Skopje; Attendance: 6,500; Referees: Horváth, Márton (HUN)

19 October 2014; 16:00	Meshkov Brest (Belarus)	28–29	(France) Paris Saint-Germain	Universal Sportcomplex Victoria, Brest; Attendance: 3,500; Referees: Stenrand, Birch (DEN)
19 October 2014; 16:00	Stojković 7	(12–15)	Melić 10	Universal Sportcomplex Victoria, Brest; Attendance: 3,500; Referees: Stenrand, Birch (DEN)
19 October 2014; 16:00	3× (yellow card) 3× (suspension)	Report	3× (yellow card) 3× (suspension)	Universal Sportcomplex Victoria, Brest; Attendance: 3,500; Referees: Stenrand, Birch (DEN)

15 November 2014; 18:00	Meshkov Brest (Belarus)	26–22	(Croatia) Zagreb	Universal Sportcomplex Victoria, Brest; Attendance: 3,000; Referees: Horáček, Novotný (CZE)
15 November 2014; 18:00	Manojlović 7	(12–7)	Vuglač 8	Universal Sportcomplex Victoria, Brest; Attendance: 3,000; Referees: Horáček, Novotný (CZE)
15 November 2014; 18:00	3× (yellow card) 4× (suspension)	Report	3× (yellow card) 3× (suspension)	Universal Sportcomplex Victoria, Brest; Attendance: 3,000; Referees: Horáček, Novotný (CZE)

16 November 2014; 17:00	Logroño (Spain)	31–26	(North Macedonia) Metalurg Skopje	Palacio de los Deportes de La Rioja, Logroño; Attendance: 2,400; Referees: Kurtagic, Wetterwik (SWE)
16 November 2014; 17:00	Rodríguez 9	(13–13)	Mirkulovski 8	Palacio de los Deportes de La Rioja, Logroño; Attendance: 2,400; Referees: Kurtagic, Wetterwik (SWE)
16 November 2014; 17:00	3× (yellow card) 3× (suspension)	Report	3× (yellow card) 3× (suspension)	Palacio de los Deportes de La Rioja, Logroño; Attendance: 2,400; Referees: Kurtagic, Wetterwik (SWE)

16 November 2014; 19:30	Paris Saint-Germain (France)	25–27	(Germany) THW Kiel	Stade Pierre de Coubertin, Paris; Attendance: 3,200; Referees: Dinu, Din (ROU)
16 November 2014; 19:30	Hansen 8	(13–12)	Duvnjak 7	Stade Pierre de Coubertin, Paris; Attendance: 3,200; Referees: Dinu, Din (ROU)
16 November 2014; 19:30	2× (yellow card) 5× (suspension)	Report	3× (yellow card) 2× (suspension)	Stade Pierre de Coubertin, Paris; Attendance: 3,200; Referees: Dinu, Din (ROU)

22 November 2014; 19:00	Metalurg Skopje (North Macedonia)	29–28	(Spain) Logroño	Boris Trajkovski Sports Center, Skopje; Attendance: 5,000; Referees: Stoļarovs, Līcis (LAT)
22 November 2014; 19:00	Mojsovski 11	(15–16)	García 7	Boris Trajkovski Sports Center, Skopje; Attendance: 5,000; Referees: Stoļarovs, Līcis (LAT)
22 November 2014; 19:00	2× (yellow card) 3× (suspension) 1× (red card)	Report	3× (yellow card) 5× (suspension)	Boris Trajkovski Sports Center, Skopje; Attendance: 5,000; Referees: Stoļarovs, Līcis (LAT)

22 November 2014; 21:00	THW Kiel (Germany)	33–29	(France) Paris Saint-Germain	Sparkassen-Arena, Kiel; Attendance: 10,170; Referees: Mažeika, Gatelis (LTU)
22 November 2014; 21:00	Cañellas 9	(14–15)	Hansen 8	Sparkassen-Arena, Kiel; Attendance: 10,170; Referees: Mažeika, Gatelis (LTU)
22 November 2014; 21:00	3× (yellow card) 5× (suspension)	Report	3× (yellow card) 3× (suspension)	Sparkassen-Arena, Kiel; Attendance: 10,170; Referees: Mažeika, Gatelis (LTU)

23 November 2014; 17:00	Zagreb (Croatia)	25–23	(Belarus) Meshkov Brest	Arena Zagreb, Zagreb; Attendance: 6,000; Referees: Cohen, Peretz (ISR)
23 November 2014; 17:00	Horvat 6	(11–8)	Stojković 8	Arena Zagreb, Zagreb; Attendance: 6,000; Referees: Cohen, Peretz (ISR)
23 November 2014; 17:00	3× (yellow card) 5× (suspension)	Report	3× (yellow card) 4× (suspension)	Arena Zagreb, Zagreb; Attendance: 6,000; Referees: Cohen, Peretz (ISR)

26 November 2014; 18:30	THW Kiel (Germany)	34–27	(Croatia) Zagreb	Sparkassen-Arena, Kiel; Attendance: 8,487; Referees: Caçador, Nicolau (POR)
26 November 2014; 18:30	Weinhold 9	(16–16)	Šebetić, Stepančić 5	Sparkassen-Arena, Kiel; Attendance: 8,487; Referees: Caçador, Nicolau (POR)
26 November 2014; 18:30	3× (yellow card) 3× (suspension)	Report	3× (yellow card) 5× (suspension)	Sparkassen-Arena, Kiel; Attendance: 8,487; Referees: Caçador, Nicolau (POR)

29 November 2014; 16:00	Meshkov Brest (Belarus)	33–33	(Spain) Logroño	Universal Sportcomplex Victoria, Brest; Attendance: 3,320; Referees: Konjičanin, Konjičanin (BIH)
29 November 2014; 16:00	Rutenka 8	(15–18)	García, Rodríguez 5	Universal Sportcomplex Victoria, Brest; Attendance: 3,320; Referees: Konjičanin, Konjičanin (BIH)
29 November 2014; 16:00	3× (yellow card) 3× (suspension) 1× (red card)	Report	3× (yellow card) 2× (suspension)	Universal Sportcomplex Victoria, Brest; Attendance: 3,320; Referees: Konjičanin, Konjičanin (BIH)

30 November 2014; 19:00	Paris Saint-Germain (France)	35–24	(North Macedonia) Metalurg Skopje	Stade Pierre de Coubertin, Paris; Attendance: 2,200; Referees: Erdoğan, Özdeniz (TUR)
30 November 2014; 19:00	Kopljar 6	(19–10)	Markoski 6	Stade Pierre de Coubertin, Paris; Attendance: 2,200; Referees: Erdoğan, Özdeniz (TUR)
30 November 2014; 19:00	3× (yellow card) 1× (suspension)	Report	3× (yellow card) 2× (suspension)	Stade Pierre de Coubertin, Paris; Attendance: 2,200; Referees: Erdoğan, Özdeniz (TUR)

3 December 2014; 19:30	Logroño (Spain)	30–34	(Germany) THW Kiel	Palacio de los Deportes de La Rioja, Logroño; Attendance: 3,800; Referees: Gjeding, Hansen (DEN)
3 December 2014; 19:30	Rodríguez 6	(11–14)	Cañellas 11	Palacio de los Deportes de La Rioja, Logroño; Attendance: 3,800; Referees: Gjeding, Hansen (DEN)
3 December 2014; 19:30	3× (yellow card)	Report	3× (yellow card) 2× (suspension)	Palacio de los Deportes de La Rioja, Logroño; Attendance: 3,800; Referees: Gjeding, Hansen (DEN)

6 December 2014; 19:00	Metalurg Skopje (North Macedonia)	27–27	(Belarus) Meshkov Brest	Boris Trajkovski Sports Center, Skopje; Attendance: 4,500; Referees: Hansen, Pettersen (NOR)
6 December 2014; 19:00	Manaskov 8	(12–14)	Stojković 6	Boris Trajkovski Sports Center, Skopje; Attendance: 4,500; Referees: Hansen, Pettersen (NOR)
6 December 2014; 19:00	3× (yellow card) 3× (suspension)	Report	3× (yellow card) 7× (suspension) 1× (red card)	Boris Trajkovski Sports Center, Skopje; Attendance: 4,500; Referees: Hansen, Pettersen (NOR)

9 December 2014; 18:30	Zagreb (Croatia)	25–24	(France) Paris Saint-Germain	Arena Zagreb, Zagreb; Attendance: 13,000; Referees: Stoļarovs, Līcis (LAT)
9 December 2014; 18:30	Horvat, Obranović 5	(14–13)	Narcisse 6	Arena Zagreb, Zagreb; Attendance: 13,000; Referees: Stoļarovs, Līcis (LAT)
9 December 2014; 18:30	2× (yellow card) 6× (suspension)	Report	3× (yellow card) 3× (suspension)	Arena Zagreb, Zagreb; Attendance: 13,000; Referees: Stoļarovs, Līcis (LAT)

14 February 2015; 18:00	Zagreb (Croatia)	31–30	(Spain) Logroño	Arena Zagreb, Zagreb; Attendance: 8,000; Referees: Brunovský, Čanda (SVK)
14 February 2015; 18:00	Horvat, Valčić 6	(16–13)	Jiménez 5	Arena Zagreb, Zagreb; Attendance: 8,000; Referees: Brunovský, Čanda (SVK)
14 February 2015; 18:00	3× (yellow card) 3× (suspension)	Report	3× (yellow card) 4× (suspension)	Arena Zagreb, Zagreb; Attendance: 8,000; Referees: Brunovský, Čanda (SVK)

15 February 2015; 17:00	Paris Saint-Germain (France)	36–25	(Belarus) Meshkov Brest	Stade Pierre de Coubertin, Paris; Attendance: 3,000; Referees: Krstić, Ljubić (SLO)
15 February 2015; 17:00	Hansen 8	(18–14)	Špiler 7	Stade Pierre de Coubertin, Paris; Attendance: 3,000; Referees: Krstić, Ljubić (SLO)
15 February 2015; 17:00	3× (yellow card) 4× (suspension)	Report	3× (yellow card) 5× (suspension) 1× (red card)	Stade Pierre de Coubertin, Paris; Attendance: 3,000; Referees: Krstić, Ljubić (SLO)

15 February 2015; 19:30	THW Kiel (Germany)	35–16	(North Macedonia) Metalurg Skopje	Sparkassen-Arena, Kiel; Attendance: 8,700; Referees: Poulsen, Mortensen (DEN)
15 February 2015; 19:30	Jícha 9	(17–3)	Buvinić, Talevski 4	Sparkassen-Arena, Kiel; Attendance: 8,700; Referees: Poulsen, Mortensen (DEN)
15 February 2015; 19:30	3× (yellow card) 1× (suspension)	Report	3× (yellow card) 3× (suspension)	Sparkassen-Arena, Kiel; Attendance: 8,700; Referees: Poulsen, Mortensen (DEN)

19 February 2015; 19:30	THW Kiel (Germany)	33–22	(Belarus) Meshkov Brest	Sparkassen-Arena, Kiel; Attendance: 7,100; Referees: Pandzić, Mosorinski (SRB)
19 February 2015; 19:30	Vujin 6	(17–11)	Manojlović 4	Sparkassen-Arena, Kiel; Attendance: 7,100; Referees: Pandzić, Mosorinski (SRB)
19 February 2015; 19:30	3× (yellow card) 2× (suspension)	Report	3× (yellow card) 3× (suspension)	Sparkassen-Arena, Kiel; Attendance: 7,100; Referees: Pandzić, Mosorinski (SRB)

21 February 2015; 18:00	Logroño (Spain)	35–33	(France) Paris Saint-Germain	Palacio de los Deportes de La Rioja, Logroño; Attendance: 3,500; Referees: Johansson, Kliko (SWE)
21 February 2015; 18:00	Eilert 9	(15–16)	Gunnarsson 9	Palacio de los Deportes de La Rioja, Logroño; Attendance: 3,500; Referees: Johansson, Kliko (SWE)
21 February 2015; 18:00	3× (yellow card) 2× (suspension)	Report	2× (yellow card) 2× (suspension)	Palacio de los Deportes de La Rioja, Logroño; Attendance: 3,500; Referees: Johansson, Kliko (SWE)

22 February 2015; 19:00	Metalurg Skopje (North Macedonia)	20–22	(Croatia) Zagreb	Boris Trajkovski Sports Center, Skopje; Attendance: 3,000; Referees: Pavićević, Ražnatović (MNE)
22 February 2015; 19:00	Buvinić 6	(10–12)	Horvat 5	Boris Trajkovski Sports Center, Skopje; Attendance: 3,000; Referees: Pavićević, Ražnatović (MNE)
22 February 2015; 19:00	3× (yellow card) 2× (suspension)	Report	3× (yellow card) 4× (suspension)	Boris Trajkovski Sports Center, Skopje; Attendance: 3,000; Referees: Pavićević, Ražnatović (MNE)

== Group B ==
Team	Pld	W	D	L	GF	GA	GD	Pts
(Spain) Barcelona	10	8	1	1	338	280	+58	17
(Denmark) KIF Kolding København	10	6	2	2	292	273	+19	14
(Poland) Wisła Płock	10	6	1	3	288	280	+8	13
(Germany) Flensburg-Handewitt	10	6	0	4	288	277	+11	12
(Sweden) Alingsås HK	10	1	0	9	252	298	−46	2
(Turkey) Beşiktaş	10	1	0	9	253	303	−50	2

27 September 2014; 16:00	Wisła Płock (Poland)	28–19	(Turkey) Beşiktaş	Orlen Arena, Płock; Attendance: 4,300; Referees: Brunovský, Čanda (SVK)
27 September 2014; 16:00	Racoțea 7	(13–7)	Döne, Özbahar 4	Orlen Arena, Płock; Attendance: 4,300; Referees: Brunovský, Čanda (SVK)
27 September 2014; 16:00	3× (yellow card) 5× (suspension)	Report	3× (yellow card) 3× (suspension)	Orlen Arena, Płock; Attendance: 4,300; Referees: Brunovský, Čanda (SVK)

28 September 2014; 16:50	KIF Kolding København (Denmark)	35–21	(Germany) Flensburg-Handewitt	Kolding Hallen, Kolding; Attendance: 2,800; Referees: Gubica, Milošević (CRO)
28 September 2014; 16:50	Andersen 7	(19–13)	Eggert 8	Kolding Hallen, Kolding; Attendance: 2,800; Referees: Gubica, Milošević (CRO)
28 September 2014; 16:50	3× (yellow card) 4× (suspension)	Report	3× (yellow card) 4× (suspension)	Kolding Hallen, Kolding; Attendance: 2,800; Referees: Gubica, Milošević (CRO)

28 September 2014; 17:30	Alingsås HK (Sweden)	28–38	(Spain) Barcelona	Estrad Alingsås, Alingsås; Attendance: 2,660; Referees: Horáček, Novotný (CZE)
28 September 2014; 17:30	Konradsson 5	(16–21)	Nøddesbo 9	Estrad Alingsås, Alingsås; Attendance: 2,660; Referees: Horáček, Novotný (CZE)
28 September 2014; 17:30	3× (yellow card) 4× (suspension) 1× (red card)	Report	2× (yellow card) 1× (suspension) 1× (red card)	Estrad Alingsås, Alingsås; Attendance: 2,660; Referees: Horáček, Novotný (CZE)

5 October 2014; 12:30	Barcelona (Spain)	30–25	(Poland) Wisła Płock	Palau Blaugrana, Barcelona; Attendance: 1,972; Referees: Mažeika, Gatelis (LTU)
5 October 2014; 12:30	Lazarov 9	(13–12)	Rocha, Zelenović 5	Palau Blaugrana, Barcelona; Attendance: 1,972; Referees: Mažeika, Gatelis (LTU)
5 October 2014; 12:30	3× (yellow card) 3× (suspension)	Report	2× (yellow card) 4× (suspension)	Palau Blaugrana, Barcelona; Attendance: 1,972; Referees: Mažeika, Gatelis (LTU)

5 October 2014; 16:10	Beşiktaş (Turkey)	24–33	(Denmark) KIF Kolding København	Sinan Erdem Dome, Istanbul; Attendance: 6,000; Referees: Nikolov, Nachevski (MKD)
5 October 2014; 16:10	Döne 6	(11–16)	Spellerberg 7	Sinan Erdem Dome, Istanbul; Attendance: 6,000; Referees: Nikolov, Nachevski (MKD)
5 October 2014; 16:10	3× (yellow card) 2× (suspension)	Report	3× (yellow card) 3× (suspension)	Sinan Erdem Dome, Istanbul; Attendance: 6,000; Referees: Nikolov, Nachevski (MKD)

5 October 2014; 19:30	Flensburg-Handewitt (Germany)	31–21	(Sweden) Alingsås HK	Campushalle, Flensburg; Attendance: 3,000; Referees: Opava, Válek (CZE)
5 October 2014; 19:30	Mogensen 8	(19–10)	Konradsson 5	Campushalle, Flensburg; Attendance: 3,000; Referees: Opava, Válek (CZE)
5 October 2014; 19:30	2× (yellow card) 5× (suspension)	Report	3× (yellow card) 1× (suspension)	Campushalle, Flensburg; Attendance: 3,000; Referees: Opava, Válek (CZE)

8 October 2014; 19:30	Flensburg-Handewitt (Germany)	35–28	(Poland) Wisła Płock	Campushalle, Flensburg; Attendance: 3,517; Referees: Pichon, Reveret (FRA)
8 October 2014; 19:30	three players 7	(21–16)	Ghionea 7	Campushalle, Flensburg; Attendance: 3,517; Referees: Pichon, Reveret (FRA)
8 October 2014; 19:30	3× (yellow card) 5× (suspension)	Report	3× (yellow card) 2× (suspension)	Campushalle, Flensburg; Attendance: 3,517; Referees: Pichon, Reveret (FRA)

9 October 2014; 19:00	Alingsås HK (Sweden)	19–23	(Denmark) KIF Kolding København	Estrad Alingsås, Alingsås; Attendance: 1,691; Referees: Konjičanin, Konjičanin (BIH)
9 October 2014; 19:00	Claar 5	(13–15)	K.Andersson 6	Estrad Alingsås, Alingsås; Attendance: 1,691; Referees: Konjičanin, Konjičanin (BIH)
9 October 2014; 19:00	3× (yellow card) 4× (suspension)	Report	3× (yellow card) 4× (suspension)	Estrad Alingsås, Alingsås; Attendance: 1,691; Referees: Konjičanin, Konjičanin (BIH)

12 October 2014; 17:00	Barcelona (Spain)	35–25	(Turkey) Beşiktaş	Palau Blaugrana, Barcelona; Attendance: 1,789; Referees: Elíasson, Pálsson (ISL)
12 October 2014; 17:00	Sigurðsson 8	(19–12)	Feuchtmann 6	Palau Blaugrana, Barcelona; Attendance: 1,789; Referees: Elíasson, Pálsson (ISL)
12 October 2014; 17:00	3× (yellow card) 2× (suspension)	Report	3× (yellow card) 5× (suspension) 1× (red card)	Palau Blaugrana, Barcelona; Attendance: 1,789; Referees: Elíasson, Pálsson (ISL)

16 October 2014; 20:30	Beşiktaş (Turkey)	20–27	(Germany) Flensburg-Handewitt	Şehit Polis Recep Topaloğlu Sports Hall, İzmit; Attendance: 3,500; Referees: Santos, Fonseca (POR)
16 October 2014; 20:30	Dačević 6	(11–11)	Glandorf 7	Şehit Polis Recep Topaloğlu Sports Hall, İzmit; Attendance: 3,500; Referees: Santos, Fonseca (POR)
16 October 2014; 20:30	2× (yellow card) 5× (suspension)	Report	3× (yellow card) 9× (suspension) 2× (red card)	Şehit Polis Recep Topaloğlu Sports Hall, İzmit; Attendance: 3,500; Referees: Santos, Fonseca (POR)

19 October 2014; 15:30	Wisła Płock (Poland)	28–25	(Sweden) Alingsås HK	Orlen Arena, Płock; Attendance: 4,500; Referees: Gubica, Milošević (CRO)
19 October 2014; 15:30	Zelenović 10	(15–9)	Konradsson 10	Orlen Arena, Płock; Attendance: 4,500; Referees: Gubica, Milošević (CRO)
19 October 2014; 15:30	3× (yellow card) 4× (suspension)	Report	3× (yellow card) 6× (suspension)	Orlen Arena, Płock; Attendance: 4,500; Referees: Gubica, Milošević (CRO)

19 October 2014; 16:50	KIF Kolding København (Denmark)	27–27	(Spain) Barcelona	Brøndby Hall, Brøndby; Attendance: 5,000; Referees: Zotin, Volodkov (RUS)
19 October 2014; 16:50	Spellerberg 7	(14–16)	Karabatić 6	Brøndby Hall, Brøndby; Attendance: 5,000; Referees: Zotin, Volodkov (RUS)
19 October 2014; 16:50	3× (yellow card) 5× (suspension)	Report	3× (yellow card) 3× (suspension)	Brøndby Hall, Brøndby; Attendance: 5,000; Referees: Zotin, Volodkov (RUS)

13 November 2014; 18:45	Wisła Płock (Poland)	28–29	(Denmark) KIF Kolding København	Orlen Arena, Płock; Attendance: 3,500; Referees: Caçador, Nicolau (POR)
13 November 2014; 18:45	Jurkiewicz, Syprzak 5	(15–14)	Karlsson 7	Orlen Arena, Płock; Attendance: 3,500; Referees: Caçador, Nicolau (POR)
13 November 2014; 18:45	2× (yellow card) 5× (suspension)	Report	3× (yellow card) 3× (suspension)	Orlen Arena, Płock; Attendance: 3,500; Referees: Caçador, Nicolau (POR)

15 November 2014; 21:00	Flensburg-Handewitt (Germany)	33–37	(Spain) Barcelona	Campushalle, Flensburg; Attendance: 6,300; Referees: Krstić, Ljubić (SLO)
15 November 2014; 21:00	Glandorf 11	(16–16)	Lazarov 10	Campushalle, Flensburg; Attendance: 6,300; Referees: Krstić, Ljubić (SLO)
15 November 2014; 21:00	3× (yellow card) 2× (suspension)	Report	2× (yellow card) 3× (suspension)	Campushalle, Flensburg; Attendance: 6,300; Referees: Krstić, Ljubić (SLO)

16 November 2014; 19:00	Beşiktaş (Turkey)	28–26	(Sweden) Alingsås HK	Şehit Polis Recep Topaloğlu Sports Hall, İzmit; Attendance: 3,000; Referees: Pichon, Reveret (FRA)
16 November 2014; 19:00	Ninčević 9	(13–15)	Enström 6	Şehit Polis Recep Topaloğlu Sports Hall, İzmit; Attendance: 3,000; Referees: Pichon, Reveret (FRA)
16 November 2014; 19:00	3× (yellow card) 4× (suspension)	Report	3× (yellow card) 4× (suspension)	Şehit Polis Recep Topaloğlu Sports Hall, İzmit; Attendance: 3,000; Referees: Pichon, Reveret (FRA)

20 November 2014; 19:00	Alingsås HK (Sweden)	27–24	(Turkey) Beşiktaş	Estrad Alingsås, Alingsås; Attendance: 1,546; Referees: Lah, Sok (SLO)
20 November 2014; 19:00	Enström, Johansson 5	(14–12)	Özbahar 6	Estrad Alingsås, Alingsås; Attendance: 1,546; Referees: Lah, Sok (SLO)
20 November 2014; 19:00	3× (yellow card) 5× (suspension)	Report	3× (yellow card) 6× (suspension) 1× (red card)	Estrad Alingsås, Alingsås; Attendance: 1,546; Referees: Lah, Sok (SLO)

23 November 2014; 16:55	KIF Kolding København (Denmark)	30–30	(Poland) Wisła Płock	Brøndby Hall, Brøndby; Attendance: 4,058; Referees: Dobrovits, Tájok (HUN)
23 November 2014; 16:55	L.Andersson 7	(14–14)	Ghionea, Syprzak 6	Brøndby Hall, Brøndby; Attendance: 4,058; Referees: Dobrovits, Tájok (HUN)
23 November 2014; 16:55	1× (yellow card) 4× (suspension)	Report	3× (yellow card) 5× (suspension) 1× (red card)	Brøndby Hall, Brøndby; Attendance: 4,058; Referees: Dobrovits, Tájok (HUN)

23 November 2014; 19:30	Barcelona (Spain)	36–27	(Germany) Flensburg-Handewitt	Palau Blaugrana, Barcelona; Attendance: 5,202; Referees: Dentz, Reibel (FRA)
23 November 2014; 19:30	Lazarov, Sigurðsson 9	(14–16)	Mogensen 7	Palau Blaugrana, Barcelona; Attendance: 5,202; Referees: Dentz, Reibel (FRA)
23 November 2014; 19:30	3× (yellow card) 4× (suspension)	Report	2× (yellow card) 4× (suspension)	Palau Blaugrana, Barcelona; Attendance: 5,202; Referees: Dentz, Reibel (FRA)

29 November 2014; 16:15	Barcelona (Spain)	42–29	(Sweden) Alingsås HK	Palau Blaugrana, Barcelona; Attendance: 2,061; Referees: Horváth, Márton (HUN)
29 November 2014; 16:15	Lazarov 12	(18–17)	Tellander 6	Palau Blaugrana, Barcelona; Attendance: 2,061; Referees: Horváth, Márton (HUN)
29 November 2014; 16:15	2× (yellow card) 2× (suspension)	Report	3× (yellow card) 3× (suspension) 1× (red card)	Palau Blaugrana, Barcelona; Attendance: 2,061; Referees: Horváth, Márton (HUN)

29 November 2014; 17:00	Beşiktaş (Turkey)	30–33	(Poland) Wisła Płock	Şehit Polis Recep Topaloğlu Sports Hall, İzmit; Attendance: 1,500; Referees: Jurinović, Mrvica (CRO)
29 November 2014; 17:00	Özbahar 8	(14–15)	Ghionea 8	Şehit Polis Recep Topaloğlu Sports Hall, İzmit; Attendance: 1,500; Referees: Jurinović, Mrvica (CRO)
29 November 2014; 17:00	3× (yellow card) 3× (suspension)	Report	3× (yellow card) 3× (suspension)	Şehit Polis Recep Topaloğlu Sports Hall, İzmit; Attendance: 1,500; Referees: Jurinović, Mrvica (CRO)

30 November 2014; 19:30	Flensburg-Handewitt (Germany)	27–20	(Denmark) KIF Kolding København	Campushalle, Flensburg; Attendance: 5,537; Referees: Stark, Stefan (ROU)
30 November 2014; 19:30	Mogensen 7	(15–10)	K.Andersson 6	Campushalle, Flensburg; Attendance: 5,537; Referees: Stark, Stefan (ROU)
30 November 2014; 19:30	3× (yellow card) 4× (suspension)	Report	3× (yellow card) 3× (suspension)	Campushalle, Flensburg; Attendance: 5,537; Referees: Stark, Stefan (ROU)

4 December 2014; 19:30	Alingsås HK (Sweden)	22–27	(Germany) Flensburg-Handewitt	Estrad Alingsås, Alingsås; Attendance: 2,147; Referees: Dobrovits, Tájok (HUN)
4 December 2014; 19:30	Claar 5	(14–16)	Glandorf 8	Estrad Alingsås, Alingsås; Attendance: 2,147; Referees: Dobrovits, Tájok (HUN)
4 December 2014; 19:30	3× (yellow card) 2× (suspension)	Report	2× (yellow card) 5× (suspension)	Estrad Alingsås, Alingsås; Attendance: 2,147; Referees: Dobrovits, Tájok (HUN)

6 December 2014; 18:30	Wisła Płock (Poland)	34–31	(Spain) Barcelona	Orlen Arena, Płock; Attendance: 5,467; Referees: Elíasson, Pálsson (ISL)
6 December 2014; 18:30	Zelenović 7	(17–15)	Rutenka 9	Orlen Arena, Płock; Attendance: 5,467; Referees: Elíasson, Pálsson (ISL)
6 December 2014; 18:30	3× (yellow card) 5× (suspension)	Report	3× (yellow card) 1× (suspension)	Orlen Arena, Płock; Attendance: 5,467; Referees: Elíasson, Pálsson (ISL)

7 December 2014; 16:50	KIF Kolding København (Denmark)	34–31	(Turkey) Beşiktaş	Kolding Hallen, Kolding; Attendance: 2,389; Referees: Dentz, Reibel (FRA)
7 December 2014; 16:50	Spellerberg 12	(19–16)	Ninčević 7	Kolding Hallen, Kolding; Attendance: 2,389; Referees: Dentz, Reibel (FRA)
7 December 2014; 16:50	2× (yellow card) 2× (suspension)	Report	3× (yellow card) 3× (suspension)	Kolding Hallen, Kolding; Attendance: 2,389; Referees: Dentz, Reibel (FRA)

11 February 2015; 19:30	Flensburg-Handewitt (Germany)	31–27	(Turkey) Beşiktaş	Campushalle, Flensburg; Attendance: 4,687; Referees: Horáček, Novotný (CZE)
11 February 2015; 19:30	Eggert 8	(15–14)	Ninčević 7	Campushalle, Flensburg; Attendance: 4,687; Referees: Horáček, Novotný (CZE)
11 February 2015; 19:30	3× (yellow card) 3× (suspension)	Report	2× (yellow card) 4× (suspension)	Campushalle, Flensburg; Attendance: 4,687; Referees: Horáček, Novotný (CZE)

15 February 2015; 13:30	Alingsås HK (Sweden)	22–23	(Poland) Wisła Płock	Estrad Alingsås, Alingsås; Attendance: 1,178; Referees: Zotin, Volodkov (RUS)
15 February 2015; 13:30	Fagerlund 6	(8–9)	Tioumentsev 5	Estrad Alingsås, Alingsås; Attendance: 1,178; Referees: Zotin, Volodkov (RUS)
15 February 2015; 13:30	3× (yellow card) 3× (suspension)	Report	3× (yellow card) 2× (suspension)	Estrad Alingsås, Alingsås; Attendance: 1,178; Referees: Zotin, Volodkov (RUS)

15 February 2015; 19:15	Barcelona (Spain)	33–27	(Denmark) KIF Kolding København	Palau Blaugrana, Barcelona; Attendance: 5,131; Referees: Dinu, Din (ROU)
15 February 2015; 19:15	Rutenka 6	(19–11)	Spellerberg 11	Palau Blaugrana, Barcelona; Attendance: 5,131; Referees: Dinu, Din (ROU)
15 February 2015; 19:15	3× (yellow card) 5× (suspension)	Report	3× (yellow card) 7× (suspension)	Palau Blaugrana, Barcelona; Attendance: 5,131; Referees: Dinu, Din (ROU)

21 February 2015; 19:15	Beşiktaş (Turkey)	25–29	(Spain) Barcelona	Sinan Erdem Dome, Istanbul; Attendance: 4,800; Referees: Dobrovits, Tájok (HUN)
21 February 2015; 19:15	Döne 8	(12–14)	Lazarov, Rutenka 7	Sinan Erdem Dome, Istanbul; Attendance: 4,800; Referees: Dobrovits, Tájok (HUN)
21 February 2015; 19:15	1× (yellow card) 4× (suspension)	Report	2× (yellow card) 3× (suspension)	Sinan Erdem Dome, Istanbul; Attendance: 4,800; Referees: Dobrovits, Tájok (HUN)

22 February 2015; 16:50	KIF Kolding København (Denmark)	34–33	(Sweden) Alingsås HK	Kolding Hallen, Kolding; Attendance: 2,818; Referees: Elíasson, Pálsson (ISL)
22 February 2015; 16:50	Spellerberg 7	(16–15)	Claar 8	Kolding Hallen, Kolding; Attendance: 2,818; Referees: Elíasson, Pálsson (ISL)
22 February 2015; 16:50	2× (yellow card) 5× (suspension)	Report	3× (yellow card) 6× (suspension)	Kolding Hallen, Kolding; Attendance: 2,818; Referees: Elíasson, Pálsson (ISL)

22 February 2015; 19:30	Wisła Płock (Poland)	31–29	(Germany) Flensburg-Handewitt	Orlen Arena, Płock; Attendance: 5,460; Referees: Nikolov, Nachevski (MKD)
22 February 2015; 19:30	Nikčević 7	(14–13)	Nenadić 6	Orlen Arena, Płock; Attendance: 5,460; Referees: Nikolov, Nachevski (MKD)
22 February 2015; 19:30	3× (yellow card) 2× (suspension) 1× (red card)	Report	3× (yellow card) 3× (suspension)	Orlen Arena, Płock; Attendance: 5,460; Referees: Nikolov, Nachevski (MKD)

== Group C ==
Team	Pld	W	D	L	GF	GA	GD	Pts
(Hungary) MKB-MVM Veszprém	10	9	0	1	300	262	+38	18
(North Macedonia) Vardar	10	7	1	2	313	289	+24	15
(Germany) Rhein-Neckar Löwen	10	6	0	4	302	282	+20	12
(France) Montpellier	10	3	2	5	293	317	−24	8
(Slovenia) Celje	10	3	0	7	284	293	−9	6
(Russia) Chekhovskiye Medvedi	10	0	1	9	300	349	−49	1

27 September 2014; 18:00	Chekhovskiye Medvedi (Russia)	32–37	(Hungary) MKB-MVM Veszprém	Olimpiysky Sport Palace, Chekhov; Attendance: 2,500; Referees: Pandzić, Mosorinski (SRB)
27 September 2014; 18:00	Dereven 9	(17–19)	Ilić 11	Olimpiysky Sport Palace, Chekhov; Attendance: 2,500; Referees: Pandzić, Mosorinski (SRB)
27 September 2014; 18:00	3× (yellow card) 5× (suspension)	Report	3× (yellow card) 4× (suspension) 1× (red card)	Olimpiysky Sport Palace, Chekhov; Attendance: 2,500; Referees: Pandzić, Mosorinski (SRB)

27 September 2014; 20:30	Celje (Slovenia)	26–27	(North Macedonia) Vardar	Zlatorog Arena, Celje; Attendance: 3,900; Referees: Johansson, Kliko (SWE)
27 September 2014; 20:30	Zarabec 10	(12–12)	Dibirov 11	Zlatorog Arena, Celje; Attendance: 3,900; Referees: Johansson, Kliko (SWE)
27 September 2014; 20:30	3× (yellow card) 5× (suspension)	Report	2× (yellow card) 6× (suspension) 1× (red card)	Zlatorog Arena, Celje; Attendance: 3,900; Referees: Johansson, Kliko (SWE)

27 September 2014; 21:00	Rhein-Neckar Löwen (Germany)	35–24	(France) Montpellier	SAP Arena, Mannheim; Attendance: 3,119; Referees: Gousko, Repkin (BLR)
27 September 2014; 21:00	Myrhol 6	(18–11)	three players 4	SAP Arena, Mannheim; Attendance: 3,119; Referees: Gousko, Repkin (BLR)
27 September 2014; 21:00	3× (yellow card) 4× (suspension)	Report	3× (yellow card) 5× (suspension) 1× (red card)	SAP Arena, Mannheim; Attendance: 3,119; Referees: Gousko, Repkin (BLR)

4 October 2014; 19:00	Vardar (North Macedonia)	39–28	(Russia) Chekhovskiye Medvedi	Jane Sandanski Arena, Skopje; Attendance: 5,500; Referees: Poulsen, Mortensen (DEN)
4 October 2014; 19:00	Dibirov 8	(24–12)	Dereven 7	Jane Sandanski Arena, Skopje; Attendance: 5,500; Referees: Poulsen, Mortensen (DEN)
4 October 2014; 19:00	3× (yellow card) 3× (suspension)	Report	2× (yellow card) 1× (suspension)	Jane Sandanski Arena, Skopje; Attendance: 5,500; Referees: Poulsen, Mortensen (DEN)

4 October 2014; 21:00	MKB-MVM Veszprém (Hungary)	27–24	(Germany) Rhein-Neckar Löwen	Veszprém Aréna, Veszprém; Attendance: 5,019; Referees: Jurinović, Mrvica (CRO)
4 October 2014; 21:00	Ilić 9	(10–11)	Gensheimer 9	Veszprém Aréna, Veszprém; Attendance: 5,019; Referees: Jurinović, Mrvica (CRO)
4 October 2014; 21:00	2× (yellow card) 3× (suspension)	Report	3× (yellow card) 4× (suspension)	Veszprém Aréna, Veszprém; Attendance: 5,019; Referees: Jurinović, Mrvica (CRO)

5 October 2014; 17:00	Montpellier (France)	35–29	(Slovenia) Celje	Park&Suites Arena, Montpellier; Attendance: 5,500; Referees: Marín, García (ESP)
5 October 2014; 17:00	Gajić 10	(14–17)	Janc 8	Park&Suites Arena, Montpellier; Attendance: 5,500; Referees: Marín, García (ESP)
5 October 2014; 17:00	3× (yellow card) 3× (suspension)	Report	3× (yellow card) 3× (suspension) 1× (red card)	Park&Suites Arena, Montpellier; Attendance: 5,500; Referees: Marín, García (ESP)

9 October 2014; 19:30	Chekhovskiye Medvedi (Russia)	30–35	(Slovenia) Celje	Olimpiysky Sport Palace, Chekhov; Attendance: 2,000; Referees: Dinu, Din (ROU)
9 October 2014; 19:30	Kovalev, Zhitnikov 8	(15–17)	Slišković 9	Olimpiysky Sport Palace, Chekhov; Attendance: 2,000; Referees: Dinu, Din (ROU)
9 October 2014; 19:30	3× (yellow card) 5× (suspension)	Report	3× (yellow card) 4× (suspension)	Olimpiysky Sport Palace, Chekhov; Attendance: 2,000; Referees: Dinu, Din (ROU)

12 October 2014; 19:00	MKB-MVM Veszprém (Hungary)	30–29	(France) Montpellier	Veszprém Aréna, Veszprém; Attendance: 5,100; Referees: Cohen, Peretz (ISR)
12 October 2014; 19:00	Ilić 6	(14–11)	Grebille, Kavtičnik 9	Veszprém Aréna, Veszprém; Attendance: 5,100; Referees: Cohen, Peretz (ISR)
12 October 2014; 19:00	3× (yellow card) 2× (suspension)	Report	3× (yellow card) 4× (suspension)	Veszprém Aréna, Veszprém; Attendance: 5,100; Referees: Cohen, Peretz (ISR)

12 October 2014; 19:30	Vardar (North Macedonia)	28–25	(Germany) Rhein-Neckar Löwen	Jane Sandanski Arena, Skopje; Attendance: 5,500; Referees: Horáček, Novotný (CZE)
12 October 2014; 19:30	Brumen 6	(13–13)	Petersson 7	Jane Sandanski Arena, Skopje; Attendance: 5,500; Referees: Horáček, Novotný (CZE)
12 October 2014; 19:30	3× (yellow card) 5× (suspension)	Report	2× (yellow card) 4× (suspension)	Jane Sandanski Arena, Skopje; Attendance: 5,500; Referees: Horáček, Novotný (CZE)

18 October 2014; 20:30	Celje (Slovenia)	21–24	(Hungary) MKB-MVM Veszprém	Zlatorog Arena, Celje; Attendance: 5,051; Referees: Gousko, Repkin (BLR)
18 October 2014; 20:30	Zarabec 5	(9–14)	Ilić 7	Zlatorog Arena, Celje; Attendance: 5,051; Referees: Gousko, Repkin (BLR)
18 October 2014; 20:30	3× (yellow card) 5× (suspension)	Report	3× (yellow card) 5× (suspension)	Zlatorog Arena, Celje; Attendance: 5,051; Referees: Gousko, Repkin (BLR)

19 October 2014; 17:00	Montpellier (France)	34–34	(North Macedonia) Vardar	Park&Suites Arena, Montpellier; Attendance: 3,000; Referees: Gjeding, Hansen (DEN)
19 October 2014; 17:00	Grebille 11	(19–17)	Dibirov 9	Park&Suites Arena, Montpellier; Attendance: 3,000; Referees: Gjeding, Hansen (DEN)
19 October 2014; 17:00	3× (yellow card) 3× (suspension)	Report	2× (yellow card) 1× (suspension) 2× (red card)	Park&Suites Arena, Montpellier; Attendance: 3,000; Referees: Gjeding, Hansen (DEN)

19 October 2014; 19:30	Rhein-Neckar Löwen (Germany)	34–29	(Russia) Chekhovskiye Medvedi	SAP Arena, Mannheim; Attendance: 3,714; Referees: Olesen, Pedersen (DEN)
19 October 2014; 19:30	three players 6	(16–16)	Dereven 7	SAP Arena, Mannheim; Attendance: 3,714; Referees: Olesen, Pedersen (DEN)
19 October 2014; 19:30	3× (yellow card) 2× (suspension)	Report	3× (yellow card) 1× (suspension)	SAP Arena, Mannheim; Attendance: 3,714; Referees: Olesen, Pedersen (DEN)

13 November 2014; 19:30	Rhein-Neckar Löwen (Germany)	31–27	(Slovenia) Celje	Sportzentrum Harres, Sankt Leon-Rot; Attendance: 1,686; Referees: Raluy, Sabroso (ESP)
13 November 2014; 19:30	Petersson 7	(13–15)	Zarabec 5	Sportzentrum Harres, Sankt Leon-Rot; Attendance: 1,686; Referees: Raluy, Sabroso (ESP)
13 November 2014; 19:30	3× (yellow card) 3× (suspension)	Report	3× (yellow card) 5× (suspension)	Sportzentrum Harres, Sankt Leon-Rot; Attendance: 1,686; Referees: Raluy, Sabroso (ESP)

15 November 2014; 19:00	Vardar (North Macedonia)	23–24	(Hungary) MKB-MVM Veszprém	Jane Sandanski Arena, Skopje; Attendance: 5,500; Referees: Elíasson, Pálsson (ISL)
15 November 2014; 19:00	Karačić 8	(11–13)	Ilić 6	Jane Sandanski Arena, Skopje; Attendance: 5,500; Referees: Elíasson, Pálsson (ISL)
15 November 2014; 19:00	3× (yellow card) 5× (suspension) 1× (red card)	Report	3× (yellow card) 6× (suspension)	Jane Sandanski Arena, Skopje; Attendance: 5,500; Referees: Elíasson, Pálsson (ISL)

16 November 2014; 17:45	Montpellier (France)	32–32	(Russia) Chekhovskiye Medvedi	Park&Suites Arena, Montpellier; Attendance: 5,500; Referees: Konjičanin, Konjičanin (BIH)
16 November 2014; 17:45	Kavtičnik 10	(15–14)	Kovalev 8	Park&Suites Arena, Montpellier; Attendance: 5,500; Referees: Konjičanin, Konjičanin (BIH)
16 November 2014; 17:45	2× (yellow card) 2× (suspension)	Report	2× (yellow card) 4× (suspension)	Park&Suites Arena, Montpellier; Attendance: 5,500; Referees: Konjičanin, Konjičanin (BIH)

22 November 2014; 16:30	MKB-MVM Veszprém (Hungary)	32–24	(North Macedonia) Vardar	Veszprém Aréna, Veszprém; Attendance: 5,019; Referees: Baďura, Ondogrecula (SVK)
22 November 2014; 16:30	Ilić 8	(16–10)	three players 4	Veszprém Aréna, Veszprém; Attendance: 5,019; Referees: Baďura, Ondogrecula (SVK)
22 November 2014; 16:30	3× (yellow card) 5× (suspension)	Report	3× (yellow card) 2× (suspension)	Veszprém Aréna, Veszprém; Attendance: 5,019; Referees: Baďura, Ondogrecula (SVK)

22 November 2014; 18:30	Chekhovskiye Medvedi (Russia)	33–34	(France) Montpellier	Olimpiysky Sport Palace, Chekhov; Attendance: 2,400; Referees: Hansen, Pettersen (NOR)
22 November 2014; 18:30	Dereven, Zhitnikov 9	(17–16)	Gajić 11	Olimpiysky Sport Palace, Chekhov; Attendance: 2,400; Referees: Hansen, Pettersen (NOR)
22 November 2014; 18:30	3× (yellow card) 2× (suspension)	Report	3× (yellow card) 4× (suspension)	Olimpiysky Sport Palace, Chekhov; Attendance: 2,400; Referees: Hansen, Pettersen (NOR)

23 November 2014; 17:00	Celje (Slovenia)	32–28	(Germany) Rhein-Neckar Löwen	Zlatorog Arena, Celje; Attendance: 4,000; Referees: Poulsen, Mortensen (DEN)
23 November 2014; 17:00	Miklavčič 7	(16–11)	Gensheimer 7	Zlatorog Arena, Celje; Attendance: 4,000; Referees: Poulsen, Mortensen (DEN)
23 November 2014; 17:00	3× (yellow card) 5× (suspension)	Report	3× (yellow card) 2× (suspension)	Zlatorog Arena, Celje; Attendance: 4,000; Referees: Poulsen, Mortensen (DEN)

29 November 2014; 18:15	MKB-MVM Veszprém (Hungary)	38–31	(Russia) Chekhovskiye Medvedi	Veszprém Aréna, Veszprém; Attendance: 5,000; Referees: Baranowski, Lemanowicz (POL)
29 November 2014; 18:15	Marguč 9	(17–16)	Zhitnikov 11	Veszprém Aréna, Veszprém; Attendance: 5,000; Referees: Baranowski, Lemanowicz (POL)
29 November 2014; 18:15	3× (yellow card) 3× (suspension)	Report	3× (yellow card) 4× (suspension)	Veszprém Aréna, Veszprém; Attendance: 5,000; Referees: Baranowski, Lemanowicz (POL)

29 November 2014; 19:00	Vardar (North Macedonia)	34–32	(Slovenia) Celje	Jane Sandanski Arena, Skopje; Attendance: 5,000; Referees: Cohen, Peretz (ISR)
29 November 2014; 19:00	Dibirov 7	(19–17)	Slišković 9	Jane Sandanski Arena, Skopje; Attendance: 5,000; Referees: Cohen, Peretz (ISR)
29 November 2014; 19:00	3× (yellow card) 6× (suspension)	Report	3× (yellow card) 7× (suspension)	Jane Sandanski Arena, Skopje; Attendance: 5,000; Referees: Cohen, Peretz (ISR)

29 November 2014; 21:00	Montpellier (France)	29–33	(Germany) Rhein-Neckar Löwen	Park&Suites Arena, Montpellier; Attendance: 4,500; Referees: Nikolić, Stojković (SRB)
29 November 2014; 21:00	Gajić 8	(14–18)	Gensheimer 7	Park&Suites Arena, Montpellier; Attendance: 4,500; Referees: Nikolić, Stojković (SRB)
29 November 2014; 21:00	2× (yellow card) 5× (suspension)	Report	2× (yellow card) 5× (suspension)	Park&Suites Arena, Montpellier; Attendance: 4,500; Referees: Nikolić, Stojković (SRB)

6 December 2014; 19:00	Chekhovskiye Medvedi (Russia)	34–39	(North Macedonia) Vardar	Olimpiysky Sport Palace, Chekhov; Attendance: 2,300; Referees: Leszczynski, Piechota (POL)
6 December 2014; 19:00	Dereven 13	(16–19)	Karačić 8	Olimpiysky Sport Palace, Chekhov; Attendance: 2,300; Referees: Leszczynski, Piechota (POL)
6 December 2014; 19:00	3× (yellow card) 5× (suspension)	Report	3× (yellow card) 3× (suspension)	Olimpiysky Sport Palace, Chekhov; Attendance: 2,300; Referees: Leszczynski, Piechota (POL)

6 December 2014; 20:30	Celje (Slovenia)	27–30	(France) Montpellier	Zlatorog Arena, Celje; Attendance: 5,100; Referees: Leandersson, Lindroos (FIN)
6 December 2014; 20:30	Zarabec 11	(14–10)	Kavtičnik 7	Zlatorog Arena, Celje; Attendance: 5,100; Referees: Leandersson, Lindroos (FIN)
6 December 2014; 20:30	3× (yellow card) 5× (suspension)	Report	3× (yellow card) 5× (suspension)	Zlatorog Arena, Celje; Attendance: 5,100; Referees: Leandersson, Lindroos (FIN)

6 December 2014; 21:00	Rhein-Neckar Löwen (Germany)	32–25	(Hungary) MKB-MVM Veszprém	SAP Arena, Mannheim; Attendance: 7,270; Referees: Kurtagic, Wetterwik (SWE)
6 December 2014; 21:00	three players 7	(18–10)	Ilić, Nagy 5	SAP Arena, Mannheim; Attendance: 7,270; Referees: Kurtagic, Wetterwik (SWE)
6 December 2014; 21:00	2× (yellow card) 3× (suspension)	Report	3× (yellow card) 4× (suspension)	SAP Arena, Mannheim; Attendance: 7,270; Referees: Kurtagic, Wetterwik (SWE)

14 February 2015; 19:00	Vardar (North Macedonia)	30–26	(France) Montpellier	Jane Sandanski Arena, Skopje; Attendance: 5,000; Referees: Santos, Fonseca (POR)
14 February 2015; 19:00	Dibirov 12	(18–13)	Gajić 6	Jane Sandanski Arena, Skopje; Attendance: 5,000; Referees: Santos, Fonseca (POR)
14 February 2015; 19:00	1× (yellow card) 3× (suspension)	Report	3× (yellow card) 4× (suspension)	Jane Sandanski Arena, Skopje; Attendance: 5,000; Referees: Santos, Fonseca (POR)

15 February 2015; 14:00	Chekhovskiye Medvedi (Russia)	26–32	(Germany) Rhein-Neckar Löwen	Olimpiysky Sport Palace, Chekhov; Attendance: 1,200; Referees: Konjičanin, Konjičanin (BIH)
15 February 2015; 14:00	Kovalev 8	(14–18)	Ekdahl du Rietz, Schmid 6	Olimpiysky Sport Palace, Chekhov; Attendance: 1,200; Referees: Konjičanin, Konjičanin (BIH)
15 February 2015; 14:00	2× (yellow card) 1× (suspension)	Report	3× (yellow card) 3× (suspension)	Olimpiysky Sport Palace, Chekhov; Attendance: 1,200; Referees: Konjičanin, Konjičanin (BIH)

15 February 2015; 18:45	MKB-MVM Veszprém (Hungary)	29–26	(Slovenia) Celje	Veszprém Aréna, Veszprém; Attendance: 5,000; Referees: Caçador, Nicolau (POR)
15 February 2015; 18:45	Ilić, Sulić 5	(15–10)	Razgor 4	Veszprém Aréna, Veszprém; Attendance: 5,000; Referees: Caçador, Nicolau (POR)
15 February 2015; 18:45	3× (yellow card) 2× (suspension)	Report	3× (yellow card) 4× (suspension)	Veszprém Aréna, Veszprém; Attendance: 5,000; Referees: Caçador, Nicolau (POR)

21 February 2015; 19:00	Celje (Slovenia)	29–25	(Russia) Chekhovskiye Medvedi	Zlatorog Arena, Celje; Attendance: 2,500; Referees: Buache, Meyer (SUI)
21 February 2015; 19:00	Janc, Slišković 6	(14–15)	Chernoivanov, Kovalev 5	Zlatorog Arena, Celje; Attendance: 2,500; Referees: Buache, Meyer (SUI)
21 February 2015; 19:00	3× (yellow card) 5× (suspension)	Report	3× (yellow card) 5× (suspension) 1× (red card)	Zlatorog Arena, Celje; Attendance: 2,500; Referees: Buache, Meyer (SUI)

21 February 2015; 21:00	Rhein-Neckar Löwen (Germany)	28–35	(North Macedonia) Vardar	Sportzentrum Harres, Sankt Leon-Rot; Attendance: 2,000; Referees: Togstad, Kristiansen (NOR)
21 February 2015; 21:00	Schmid 6	(13–20)	Karačić 8	Sportzentrum Harres, Sankt Leon-Rot; Attendance: 2,000; Referees: Togstad, Kristiansen (NOR)
21 February 2015; 21:00	3× (yellow card) 1× (suspension)	Report	2× (yellow card) 3× (suspension)	Sportzentrum Harres, Sankt Leon-Rot; Attendance: 2,000; Referees: Togstad, Kristiansen (NOR)

22 February 2015; 17:00	Montpellier (France)	20–34	(Hungary) MKB-MVM Veszprém	Park&Suites Arena, Montpellier; Attendance: 7,500; Referees: López, Ramírez (ESP)
22 February 2015; 17:00	Mačkovšek, Simonet 4	(9–14)	Marguč 8	Park&Suites Arena, Montpellier; Attendance: 7,500; Referees: López, Ramírez (ESP)
22 February 2015; 17:00	3× (yellow card) 3× (suspension)	Report	3× (yellow card) 7× (suspension) 1× (red card)	Park&Suites Arena, Montpellier; Attendance: 7,500; Referees: López, Ramírez (ESP)

== Group D ==
Team	Pld	W	D	L	GF	GA	GD	Pts
(Poland) Vive Tauron Kielce	10	10	0	0	312	271	+41	20
(Hungary) MOL-Pick Szeged	10	6	1	3	276	264	+12	13
(France) Dunkerque	10	4	0	6	257	263	−6	8
(Denmark) Aalborg	10	2	3	5	256	269	−13	7
(Ukraine) Motor Zaporizhzhia	10	3	0	7	283	284	−1	6
(Switzerland) Kadetten Schaffhausen	10	2	2	6	264	297	−33	6

25 September 2014; 20:00	Kadetten Schaffhausen (Switzerland)	28–33	(Poland) Vive Tauron Kielce	Schweizersbildhalle, Schaffhausen; Attendance: 2,030; Referees: López, Ramírez (ESP)
25 September 2014; 20:00	Liniger 7	(14–15)	Buntić 6	Schweizersbildhalle, Schaffhausen; Attendance: 2,030; Referees: López, Ramírez (ESP)
25 September 2014; 20:00	3× (yellow card) 4× (suspension)	Report	3× (yellow card) 2× (suspension)	Schweizersbildhalle, Schaffhausen; Attendance: 2,030; Referees: López, Ramírez (ESP)

28 September 2014; 15:10	Dunkerque (France)	21–26	(Denmark) Aalborg	Stade des Flandres, Dunkerque; Attendance: 2,300; Referees: Dinu, Din (ROU)
28 September 2014; 15:10	Touati 5	(13–13)	Guardiola, Tvedten 6	Stade des Flandres, Dunkerque; Attendance: 2,300; Referees: Dinu, Din (ROU)
28 September 2014; 15:10	3× (yellow card) 6× (suspension)	Report	3× (yellow card) 7× (suspension) 1× (red card)	Stade des Flandres, Dunkerque; Attendance: 2,300; Referees: Dinu, Din (ROU)

28 September 2014; 19:15	MOL-Pick Szeged (Hungary)	27–26	(Ukraine) Motor Zaporizhzhia	Újszegedi Sportcsarnok, Szeged; Attendance: 3,000; Referees: Stark, Ştefan (ROU)
28 September 2014; 19:15	Bombač 6	(13–11)	Shevelev 8	Újszegedi Sportcsarnok, Szeged; Attendance: 3,000; Referees: Stark, Ştefan (ROU)
28 September 2014; 19:15	3× (yellow card) 2× (suspension)	Report	3× (yellow card) 4× (suspension)	Újszegedi Sportcsarnok, Szeged; Attendance: 3,000; Referees: Stark, Ştefan (ROU)

4 October 2014; 14:00	Vive Tauron Kielce (Poland)	37–32	(Hungary) MOL-Pick Szeged	Hala Legionów, Kielce; Attendance: 4,000; Referees: Geipel, Helbig (GER)
4 October 2014; 14:00	Bielecki 6	(18–17)	Balogh, Bombač 9	Hala Legionów, Kielce; Attendance: 4,000; Referees: Geipel, Helbig (GER)
4 October 2014; 14:00	3× (yellow card) 2× (suspension) 1× (red card)	Report	2× (yellow card) 3× (suspension)	Hala Legionów, Kielce; Attendance: 4,000; Referees: Geipel, Helbig (GER)

4 October 2014; 18:00	Motor Zaporizhzhia (Ukraine)	21–23	(France) Dunkerque	Palace of Sports, Kyiv; Attendance: 3,000; Referees: Erdoğan, Özdeniz (TUR)
4 October 2014; 18:00	Burka, Stetsyura 5	(10–9)	Emonet 6	Palace of Sports, Kyiv; Attendance: 3,000; Referees: Erdoğan, Özdeniz (TUR)
4 October 2014; 18:00	3× (yellow card) 1× (suspension)	Report	2× (yellow card) 3× (suspension)	Palace of Sports, Kyiv; Attendance: 3,000; Referees: Erdoğan, Özdeniz (TUR)

5 October 2014; 16:50	Aalborg (Denmark)	23–23	(Switzerland) Kadetten Schaffhausen	Gigantium, Aalborg; Attendance: 3,021; Referees: Schulze, Tönnies (GER)
5 October 2014; 16:50	Berggren 8	(11–8)	Pendić 7	Gigantium, Aalborg; Attendance: 3,021; Referees: Schulze, Tönnies (GER)
5 October 2014; 16:50	3× (yellow card) 2× (suspension)	Report	3× (yellow card) 3× (suspension)	Gigantium, Aalborg; Attendance: 3,021; Referees: Schulze, Tönnies (GER)

9 October 2014; 20:00	Kadetten Schaffhausen (Switzerland)	25–23	(France) Dunkerque	Schweizersbildhalle, Schaffhausen; Attendance: 1,950; Referees: Togstad, Kristiansen (NOR)
9 October 2014; 20:00	Liniger 11	(12–10)	Soudry 6	Schweizersbildhalle, Schaffhausen; Attendance: 1,950; Referees: Togstad, Kristiansen (NOR)
9 October 2014; 20:00	3× (yellow card) 4× (suspension)	Report	3× (yellow card) 2× (suspension)	Schweizersbildhalle, Schaffhausen; Attendance: 1,950; Referees: Togstad, Kristiansen (NOR)

12 October 2014; 16:50	Aalborg (Denmark)	25–28	(Hungary) MOL-Pick Szeged	Gigantium, Aalborg; Attendance: 3,844; Referees: López, Ramírez (ESP)
12 October 2014; 16:50	Sagosen 9	(11–15)	Balogh 13	Gigantium, Aalborg; Attendance: 3,844; Referees: López, Ramírez (ESP)
12 October 2014; 16:50	2× (yellow card) 5× (suspension)	Report	2× (yellow card) 6× (suspension)	Gigantium, Aalborg; Attendance: 3,844; Referees: López, Ramírez (ESP)

12 October 2014; 20:00	Vive Tauron Kielce (Poland)	30–26	(Ukraine) Motor Zaporizhzhia	Hala Legionów, Kielce; Attendance: 4,000; Referees: Nikolić, Stojković (SRB)
12 October 2014; 20:00	Lijewski 7	(17–14)	Burka 6	Hala Legionów, Kielce; Attendance: 4,000; Referees: Nikolić, Stojković (SRB)
12 October 2014; 20:00	3× (yellow card) 5× (suspension) 1× (red card)	Report	2× (yellow card) 5× (suspension)	Hala Legionów, Kielce; Attendance: 4,000; Referees: Nikolić, Stojković (SRB)

18 October 2014; 16:00	Dunkerque (France)	25–28	(Poland) Vive Tauron Kielce	Stade des Flandres, Dunkerque; Attendance: 2,300; Referees: Stoļarovs, Līcis (LAT)
18 October 2014; 16:00	Emonet 6	(12–14)	Bielecki 7	Stade des Flandres, Dunkerque; Attendance: 2,300; Referees: Stoļarovs, Līcis (LAT)
18 October 2014; 16:00	2× (yellow card) 6× (suspension)	Report	2× (yellow card) 2× (suspension)	Stade des Flandres, Dunkerque; Attendance: 2,300; Referees: Stoļarovs, Līcis (LAT)

18 October 2014; 17:50	Motor Zaporizhzhia (Ukraine)	25–28	(Denmark) Aalborg	Palace of Sports, Kyiv; Attendance: 2,100; Referees: Krstić, Ljubić (SLO)
18 October 2014; 17:50	Onufryienko 9	(13–13)	Jensen, Tvedten 7	Palace of Sports, Kyiv; Attendance: 2,100; Referees: Krstić, Ljubić (SLO)
18 October 2014; 17:50	3× (yellow card) 1× (suspension)	Report	2× (yellow card) 4× (suspension)	Palace of Sports, Kyiv; Attendance: 2,100; Referees: Krstić, Ljubić (SLO)

18 October 2014; 18:30	MOL-Pick Szeged (Hungary)	34–24	(Switzerland) Kadetten Schaffhausen	Újszegedi Sportcsarnok, Szeged; Attendance: 3,200; Referees: Nikolov, Nachevski (MKD)
18 October 2014; 18:30	Bombač 11	(16–13)	Jurcă 6	Újszegedi Sportcsarnok, Szeged; Attendance: 3,200; Referees: Nikolov, Nachevski (MKD)
18 October 2014; 18:30	3× (yellow card) 2× (suspension)	Report	3× (yellow card) 7× (suspension) 1× (red card)	Újszegedi Sportcsarnok, Szeged; Attendance: 3,200; Referees: Nikolov, Nachevski (MKD)

13 November 2014; 18:00	Motor Zaporizhzhia (Ukraine)	31–26	(Switzerland) Kadetten Schaffhausen	Palace of Sports, Kyiv; Attendance: 2,000; Referees: Leandersson, Lindroos (FIN)
13 November 2014; 18:00	Onufryienko, Skopintsev 9	(18–13)	Pendic 6	Palace of Sports, Kyiv; Attendance: 2,000; Referees: Leandersson, Lindroos (FIN)
13 November 2014; 18:00	3× (yellow card) 3× (suspension)	Report	3× (yellow card) 3× (suspension)	Palace of Sports, Kyiv; Attendance: 2,000; Referees: Leandersson, Lindroos (FIN)

16 November 2014; 16:00	MOL-Pick Szeged (Hungary)	23–21	(France) Dunkerque	Újszegedi Sportcsarnok, Szeged; Attendance: 3,100; Referees: Pavićević, Ražnatović (MNE)
16 November 2014; 16:00	Balogh 7	(11–10)	Butto 9	Újszegedi Sportcsarnok, Szeged; Attendance: 3,100; Referees: Pavićević, Ražnatović (MNE)
16 November 2014; 16:00	3× (yellow card) 3× (suspension)	Report	3× (yellow card) 1× (suspension)	Újszegedi Sportcsarnok, Szeged; Attendance: 3,100; Referees: Pavićević, Ražnatović (MNE)

16 November 2014; 16:50	Aalborg (Denmark)	25–27	(Poland) Vive Tauron Kielce	Gigantium, Aalborg; Attendance: 4,115; Referees: Jurinović, Mrvica (CRO)
16 November 2014; 16:50	Berggren 7	(12–13)	Lijewski 6	Gigantium, Aalborg; Attendance: 4,115; Referees: Jurinović, Mrvica (CRO)
16 November 2014; 16:50	3× (yellow card) 2× (suspension)	Report	2× (yellow card) 3× (suspension)	Gigantium, Aalborg; Attendance: 4,115; Referees: Jurinović, Mrvica (CRO)

20 November 2014; 20:00	Kadetten Schaffhausen (Switzerland)	32–37	(Ukraine) Motor Zaporizhzhia	Schweizersbildhalle, Schaffhausen; Attendance: 2,280; Referees: Dinu, Din (ROU)
20 November 2014; 20:00	Graubner 8	(14–18)	Burka 7	Schweizersbildhalle, Schaffhausen; Attendance: 2,280; Referees: Dinu, Din (ROU)
20 November 2014; 20:00	3× (yellow card) 6× (suspension)	Report	3× (yellow card) 5× (suspension)	Schweizersbildhalle, Schaffhausen; Attendance: 2,280; Referees: Dinu, Din (ROU)

22 November 2014; 14:30	Dunkerque (France)	24–25	(Hungary) MOL-Pick Szeged	Stade des Flandres, Dunkerque; Attendance: 2,400; Referees: Gubica, Milošević (CRO)
22 November 2014; 14:30	Nagy 6	(12–15)	Bombač 4	Stade des Flandres, Dunkerque; Attendance: 2,400; Referees: Gubica, Milošević (CRO)
22 November 2014; 14:30	3× (yellow card) 4× (suspension) 1× (red card)	Report	3× (yellow card) 5× (suspension) 1× (red card)	Stade des Flandres, Dunkerque; Attendance: 2,400; Referees: Gubica, Milošević (CRO)

23 November 2014; 15:10	Vive Tauron Kielce (Poland)	33–26	(Denmark) Aalborg	Hala Legionów, Kielce; Attendance: 4,200; Referees: Gousko, Repkin (BLR)
23 November 2014; 15:10	Buntić 8	(18–15)	Sagosen 7	Hala Legionów, Kielce; Attendance: 4,200; Referees: Gousko, Repkin (BLR)
23 November 2014; 15:10	3× (yellow card) 1× (suspension)	Report	3× (yellow card) 3× (suspension)	Hala Legionów, Kielce; Attendance: 4,200; Referees: Gousko, Repkin (BLR)

26 November 2014; 18:00	Motor Zaporizhzhia (Ukraine)	25–29	(Hungary) MOL-Pick Szeged	Palace of Sports, Kyiv; Attendance: 1,900; Referees: Brunovský, Čanda (SVK)
26 November 2014; 18:00	Onufryienko 8	(12–16)	Balogh, Bombač 7	Palace of Sports, Kyiv; Attendance: 1,900; Referees: Brunovský, Čanda (SVK)
26 November 2014; 18:00	3× (yellow card) 2× (suspension)	Report	3× (yellow card) 5× (suspension)	Palace of Sports, Kyiv; Attendance: 1,900; Referees: Brunovský, Čanda (SVK)

30 November 2014; 13:30	Vive Tauron Kielce (Poland)	33–24	(Switzerland) Kadetten Schaffhausen	Hala Legionów, Kielce; Attendance: 4,000; Referees: Krstić, Ljubić (SLO)
30 November 2014; 13:30	Čupić 9	(14–12)	Liniger 11	Hala Legionów, Kielce; Attendance: 4,000; Referees: Krstić, Ljubić (SLO)
30 November 2014; 13:30	2× (yellow card) 1× (suspension)	Report	3× (yellow card) 2× (suspension)	Hala Legionów, Kielce; Attendance: 4,000; Referees: Krstić, Ljubić (SLO)

30 November 2014; 16:50	Aalborg (Denmark)	25–28	(France) Dunkerque	Gigantium, Aalborg; Attendance: 3,653; Referees: Geipel, Helbig (GER)
30 November 2014; 16:50	Sagosen, Slundt 6	(13–15)	three players 5	Gigantium, Aalborg; Attendance: 3,653; Referees: Geipel, Helbig (GER)
30 November 2014; 16:50	3× (yellow card) 5× (suspension) 1× (red card)	Report	2× (yellow card) 4× (suspension)	Gigantium, Aalborg; Attendance: 3,653; Referees: Geipel, Helbig (GER)

4 December 2014; 20:00	Kadetten Schaffhausen (Switzerland)	25-25	(Denmark) Aalborg	Schweizersbildhalle, Schaffhausen; Attendance: 2,210; Referees: Johansson, Kliko (SWE)
4 December 2014; 20:00	Liniger 8	(14–9)	Jensen, Tvedten 6	Schweizersbildhalle, Schaffhausen; Attendance: 2,210; Referees: Johansson, Kliko (SWE)
4 December 2014; 20:00	3× (yellow card) 6× (suspension)	Report	3× (yellow card) 2× (suspension)	Schweizersbildhalle, Schaffhausen; Attendance: 2,210; Referees: Johansson, Kliko (SWE)

6 December 2014; 16:00	Dunkerque (France)	31–29	(Ukraine) Motor Zaporizhzhia	Stade des Flandres, Dunkerque; Attendance: 2,000; Referees: Nikolov, Nachevski (MKD)
6 December 2014; 16:00	Butto 9	(17–17)	Skopintsev 8	Stade des Flandres, Dunkerque; Attendance: 2,000; Referees: Nikolov, Nachevski (MKD)
6 December 2014; 16:00	3× (yellow card) 5× (suspension)	Report	3× (yellow card) 3× (suspension) 1× (red card)	Stade des Flandres, Dunkerque; Attendance: 2,000; Referees: Nikolov, Nachevski (MKD)

6 December 2014; 16:30	MOL-Pick Szeged (Hungary)	26–27	(Poland) Vive Tauron Kielce	Újszegedi Sportcsarnok, Szeged; Attendance: 3,200; Referees: Horáček, Novotný (CZE)
6 December 2014; 16:30	Prodanović 6	(11–14)	Bielecki 6	Újszegedi Sportcsarnok, Szeged; Attendance: 3,200; Referees: Horáček, Novotný (CZE)
6 December 2014; 16:30	3× (yellow card) 5× (suspension) 1× (red card)	Report	3× (yellow card) 3× (suspension)	Újszegedi Sportcsarnok, Szeged; Attendance: 3,200; Referees: Horáček, Novotný (CZE)

12 February 2015; 20:00	Kadetten Schaffhausen (Switzerland)	32–29	(Hungary) MOL-Pick Szeged	Schweizersbildhalle, Schaffhausen; Attendance: 3,380; Referees: Mažeika, Gatelis (LTU)
12 February 2015; 20:00	Liniger 8	(19–15)	Ilyés, Prodanović 7	Schweizersbildhalle, Schaffhausen; Attendance: 3,380; Referees: Mažeika, Gatelis (LTU)
12 February 2015; 20:00	3× (yellow card) 4× (suspension)	Report	3× (yellow card) 3× (suspension) 1× (red card)	Schweizersbildhalle, Schaffhausen; Attendance: 3,380; Referees: Mažeika, Gatelis (LTU)

14 February 2015; 13:30	Vive Tauron Kielce (Poland)	36–32	(France) Dunkerque	Hala Legionów, Kielce; Attendance: 4,000; Referees: Stark, Stefan (ROU)
14 February 2015; 13:30	three players 6	(19–15)	Butto 5	Hala Legionów, Kielce; Attendance: 4,000; Referees: Stark, Stefan (ROU)
14 February 2015; 13:30	3× (yellow card) 7× (suspension)	Report	3× (yellow card) 2× (suspension)	Hala Legionów, Kielce; Attendance: 4,000; Referees: Stark, Stefan (ROU)

15 February 2015; 16:50	Aalborg (Denmark)	30–36	(Ukraine) Motor Zaporizhzhia	Gigantium, Aalborg; Attendance: 3,917; Referees: Lah, Sok (SLO)
15 February 2015; 16:50	Tvedten 7	(16–16)	Burka 9	Gigantium, Aalborg; Attendance: 3,917; Referees: Lah, Sok (SLO)
15 February 2015; 16:50	3× (yellow card) 3× (suspension)	Report	2× (yellow card) 4× (suspension) 1× (red card)	Gigantium, Aalborg; Attendance: 3,917; Referees: Lah, Sok (SLO)

18 February 2015; 19:00	Motor Zaporizhzhia (Ukraine)	27–28	(Poland) Vive Tauron Kielce	Palace of Sports, Kyiv; Attendance: 1,500; Referees: Kurtagic, Wetterwik (SWE)
18 February 2015; 19:00	Doroshchuk, Zhuk 5	(19–10)	Bielecki 7	Palace of Sports, Kyiv; Attendance: 1,500; Referees: Kurtagic, Wetterwik (SWE)
18 February 2015; 19:00	2× (yellow card) 3× (suspension)	Report	3× (yellow card) 2× (suspension)	Palace of Sports, Kyiv; Attendance: 1,500; Referees: Kurtagic, Wetterwik (SWE)

21 February 2015; 16:00	Dunkerque (France)	29–25	(Switzerland) Kadetten Schaffhausen	Stade des Flandres, Dunkerque; Attendance: 2,400; Referees: Baďura, Ondogrecula (SVK)
21 February 2015; 16:00	Emonet, Soudry 5	(14–14)	Pendić 8	Stade des Flandres, Dunkerque; Attendance: 2,400; Referees: Baďura, Ondogrecula (SVK)
21 February 2015; 16:00	3× (yellow card) 2× (suspension)	Report	3× (yellow card) 4× (suspension)	Stade des Flandres, Dunkerque; Attendance: 2,400; Referees: Baďura, Ondogrecula (SVK)

22 February 2015; 19:00	MOL-Pick Szeged (Hungary)	23–23	(Denmark) Aalborg	Újszegedi Sportcsarnok, Szeged; Attendance: 3,000; Referees: Stoļarovs, Līcis (LAT)
22 February 2015; 19:00	Hegedűs 5	(10–10)	Larsen 6	Újszegedi Sportcsarnok, Szeged; Attendance: 3,000; Referees: Stoļarovs, Līcis (LAT)
22 February 2015; 19:00	2× (yellow card) 2× (suspension)	Report	2× (yellow card) 4× (suspension)	Újszegedi Sportcsarnok, Szeged; Attendance: 3,000; Referees: Stoļarovs, Līcis (LAT)
