= 2014–15 EHF Champions League knockout stage =

This article describes the knockout stage of the 2014–15 EHF Champions League.

== Qualified teams ==
The top four placed teams from each of the four groups advanced to the knockout stage.

Group	First place	Second place	Third place	Fourth place
A	(Germany) THW Kiel	(France) Paris Saint-Germain	(Croatia) Zagreb	(Spain) CB Logroño
B	(Spain) Barcelona	(Denmark) KIF Kolding København	(Poland) Wisła Płock	(Germany) Flensburg-Handewitt
C	(Hungary) MKB-MVM Veszprém	(North Macedonia) Vardar	(Germany) Rhein-Neckar Löwen	(France) Montpellier
D	(Poland) Vive Tauron Kielce	(Hungary) MOL-Pick Szeged	(France) Dunkerque	(Denmark) Aalborg

== Last 16 ==
The draw was held on 24 February 2015 at 12:30 local time at Vienna.

=== Seedings ===
The seedings were published on 23 February 2015.

A team from Pot 1 faced a team from Pot 4, a Pot 2 team played against a team from Pot 3. The first legs were played on 11–15 March and the second legs on 18–22 March 2015.

Pot 1	Pot 2	Pot 3	Pot 4
(Germany) THW Kiel (Spain) Barcelona (Hungary) MKB-MVM Veszprém (Poland) Vive Tauron Kielce	(France) Paris Saint-Germain (Denmark) KIF Kolding København (North Macedonia) Vardar (Hungary) MOL-Pick Szeged	(Croatia) Zagreb (Poland) Wisła Płock (Germany) Rhein-Neckar Löwen (France) Dunkerque	(Spain) Logroño (Germany) Flensburg-Handewitt (France) Montpellier (Denmark) Aalborg

==== Matches ====
Team 1	Agg.	Team 2	1st leg	2nd leg
Logroño (Spain)	54–68	(Hungary) MKB-MVM Veszprém	23–31	31–37
Montpellier (France)	58–60	(Poland) Vive Tauron Kielce	25–29	33–31
Aalborg (Denmark)	33–60	(Spain) Barcelona	11–31	22–29
Flensburg-Handewitt (Germany)	49–63	(Germany) THW Kiel	21–30	28–33
Dunkerque (France)	43–46	(France) Paris Saint-Germain	21–23	22–23
Wisła Płock (Poland)	52–57	(North Macedonia) Vardar	32–26	20–31
Rhein-Neckar Löwen (Germany)	59–65	(Hungary) MOL-Pick Szeged	30–34	29–31
Zagreb (Croatia)	43–40	(Denmark) KIF Kolding København	22–17	21–23

===== First leg =====
13 March 2015; 19:00	Rhein-Neckar Löwen (Germany)	30–34	(Hungary) MOL-Pick Szeged	SAP Arena, Mannheim; Attendance: 3,370; Referees: Pichon, Reveret (FRA)
13 March 2015; 19:00	Gensheimer 8	(17–16)	Parrondo 9	SAP Arena, Mannheim; Attendance: 3,370; Referees: Pichon, Reveret (FRA)
13 March 2015; 19:00	3× (yellow card) 2× (suspension)	Report	3× (yellow card) 6× (suspension)	SAP Arena, Mannheim; Attendance: 3,370; Referees: Pichon, Reveret (FRA)

14 March 2015; 16:15	Logroño (Spain)	23–31	(Hungary) MKB-MVM Veszprém	Palacio de los Deportes de La Rioja, Logroño; Attendance: 3,100; Referees: Gubica, Milošević (CRO)
14 March 2015; 16:15	Fernández 6	(10–15)	Ilić, Sulić 9	Palacio de los Deportes de La Rioja, Logroño; Attendance: 3,100; Referees: Gubica, Milošević (CRO)
14 March 2015; 16:15	3× (yellow card) 2× (suspension)	Report	3× (yellow card) 6× (suspension)	Palacio de los Deportes de La Rioja, Logroño; Attendance: 3,100; Referees: Gubica, Milošević (CRO)

14 March 2015; 17:00	Dunkerque (France)	21–23	(France) Paris Saint-Germain	Stade des Flandres, Dunkerque; Attendance: 2,460; Referees: Geipel, Helbig (GER)
14 March 2015; 17:00	Nagy 6	(13–12)	Hansen 11	Stade des Flandres, Dunkerque; Attendance: 2,460; Referees: Geipel, Helbig (GER)
14 March 2015; 17:00	2× (yellow card) 4× (suspension)	Report	3× (yellow card) 10× (suspension) 2× (red card)	Stade des Flandres, Dunkerque; Attendance: 2,460; Referees: Geipel, Helbig (GER)

14 March 2015; 18:00	Zagreb (Croatia)	22–17	(Denmark) KIF Kolding København	Arena Zagreb, Zagreb; Attendance: 14,500; Referees: Horáček, Novotný (CZE)
14 March 2015; 18:00	Stepančić 7	(15–8)	Landin 6	Arena Zagreb, Zagreb; Attendance: 14,500; Referees: Horáček, Novotný (CZE)
14 March 2015; 18:00	3× (yellow card) 4× (suspension)	Report	3× (yellow card) 3× (suspension)	Arena Zagreb, Zagreb; Attendance: 14,500; Referees: Horáček, Novotný (CZE)

14 March 2015; 20:45	Wisła Płock (Poland)	32–26	(North Macedonia) Vardar	Orlen Arena, Płock; Attendance: 5,467; Referees: Dentz, Reibel (FRA)
14 March 2015; 20:45	Nikčević 6	(14–12)	Dujshebaev 10	Orlen Arena, Płock; Attendance: 5,467; Referees: Dentz, Reibel (FRA)
14 March 2015; 20:45	3× (yellow card) 6× (suspension)	Report	3× (yellow card) 5× (suspension)	Orlen Arena, Płock; Attendance: 5,467; Referees: Dentz, Reibel (FRA)

15 March 2015; 16:50	Aalborg (Denmark)	11–31	(Spain) Barcelona	Gigantium, Aalborg; Attendance: 4,660; Referees: Nikolić, Stojković (SRB)
15 March 2015; 16:50	Sagosen 3	(5–16)	Lazarov 8	Gigantium, Aalborg; Attendance: 4,660; Referees: Nikolić, Stojković (SRB)
15 March 2015; 16:50	3× (yellow card) 4× (suspension)	Report	3× (yellow card) 2× (suspension)	Gigantium, Aalborg; Attendance: 4,660; Referees: Nikolić, Stojković (SRB)

15 March 2015; 17:00	Montpellier (France)	25–29	(Poland) Vive Tauron Kielce	Park&Suites Arena, Montpellier; Attendance: 6,000; Referees: Zotin, Volodkov (RUS)
15 March 2015; 17:00	Kavtičnik 8	(13–16)	Bielecki 6	Park&Suites Arena, Montpellier; Attendance: 6,000; Referees: Zotin, Volodkov (RUS)
15 March 2015; 17:00	3× (yellow card) 1× (suspension)	Report	3× (yellow card) 2× (suspension)	Park&Suites Arena, Montpellier; Attendance: 6,000; Referees: Zotin, Volodkov (RUS)

15 March 2015; 19:30	Flensburg-Handewitt (Germany)	21–30	(Germany) THW Kiel	Campushalle, Flensburg; Attendance: 6,000; Referees: Johansson, Kliko (SWE)
15 March 2015; 19:30	Eggert 5	(9–16)	Ekberg, Vujin 7	Campushalle, Flensburg; Attendance: 6,000; Referees: Johansson, Kliko (SWE)
15 March 2015; 19:30	3× (yellow card) 4× (suspension)	Report	3× (yellow card) 3× (suspension) 1× (red card)	Campushalle, Flensburg; Attendance: 6,000; Referees: Johansson, Kliko (SWE)

===== Second leg =====
21 March 2015; 15:30	Vive Tauron Kielce (Poland)	31–33	(France) Montpellier	Hala Legionów, Kielce; Attendance: 4,200; Referees: Horváth, Marton (HUN)
21 March 2015; 15:30	Buntić 7	(14–15)	Simonet 11	Hala Legionów, Kielce; Attendance: 4,200; Referees: Horváth, Marton (HUN)
21 March 2015; 15:30	2× (yellow card) 1× (suspension)	Report	3× (yellow card) 3× (suspension)	Hala Legionów, Kielce; Attendance: 4,200; Referees: Horváth, Marton (HUN)

Vive Tauron Kielce won 60–58 on aggregate.

21 March 2015; 16:30	MKB-MVM Veszprém (Hungary)	37–31	(Spain) Logroño	Veszprém Aréna, Veszprém; Attendance: 5,019; Referees: Mažeika, Gatelis (LTU)
21 March 2015; 16:30	Ilić 10	(18–15)	Rodríguez 10	Veszprém Aréna, Veszprém; Attendance: 5,019; Referees: Mažeika, Gatelis (LTU)
21 March 2015; 16:30	3× (yellow card) 3× (suspension)	Report	3× (yellow card)	Veszprém Aréna, Veszprém; Attendance: 5,019; Referees: Mažeika, Gatelis (LTU)

MKB-MVM Veszprém won 68–54 on aggregate.

21 March 2015; 20:15	Vardar (North Macedonia)	31–20	(Poland) Wisła Płock	Jane Sandanski Arena, Skopje; Attendance: 5, 500; Referees: Stolarovs, Līcis (LAT)
21 March 2015; 20:15	Dujshebaev 9	(14–10)	three players 3	Jane Sandanski Arena, Skopje; Attendance: 5, 500; Referees: Stolarovs, Līcis (LAT)
21 March 2015; 20:15	3× (yellow card) 3× (suspension)	Report	2× (yellow card) 4× (suspension)	Jane Sandanski Arena, Skopje; Attendance: 5, 500; Referees: Stolarovs, Līcis (LAT)

Vardar won 57–52 on aggregate.

22 March 2015; 16:50	KIF Kolding København (Denmark)	23–21	(Croatia) Zagreb	Brøndby Hall, Brøndby; Attendance: 5,000; Referees: López, Ramírez (ESP)
22 March 2015; 16:50	Dolk, Spellerberg 6	(11–9)	Horvat, Obranović 5	Brøndby Hall, Brøndby; Attendance: 5,000; Referees: López, Ramírez (ESP)
22 March 2015; 16:50	3× (yellow card) 5× (suspension)	Report	3× (yellow card) 8× (suspension)	Brøndby Hall, Brøndby; Attendance: 5,000; Referees: López, Ramírez (ESP)

Zagreb won 43–40 on aggregate.

22 March 2015; 17:15	MOL-Pick Szeged (Hungary)	31–29	(Germany) Rhein-Neckar Löwen	Újszegedi Sportcsarnok, Szeged; Attendance: 3,000; Referees: Krstić, Ljubić (SLO)
22 March 2015; 17:15	Balogh, Bombač 8	(16–13)	Gensheimer 12	Újszegedi Sportcsarnok, Szeged; Attendance: 3,000; Referees: Krstić, Ljubić (SLO)
22 March 2015; 17:15	3× (yellow card) 2× (suspension)	Report	3× (yellow card) 3× (suspension)	Újszegedi Sportcsarnok, Szeged; Attendance: 3,000; Referees: Krstić, Ljubić (SLO)

Pick Szeged won 65–59 on aggregate.

22 March 2015; 17:30	Paris Saint-Germain (France)	23–22	(France) Dunkerque	Stade Pierre de Coubertin, Paris; Attendance: 4,000; Referees: Nikolov, Nachevski (MKD)
22 March 2015; 17:30	Hansen 8	(15–15)	Butto 8	Stade Pierre de Coubertin, Paris; Attendance: 4,000; Referees: Nikolov, Nachevski (MKD)
22 March 2015; 17:30	3× (yellow card) 5× (suspension)	Report	3× (yellow card) 6× (suspension)	Stade Pierre de Coubertin, Paris; Attendance: 4,000; Referees: Nikolov, Nachevski (MKD)

Paris Saint-Germain won 46–43 on aggregate.

22 March 2015; 18:50	Barcelona (Spain)	29–22	(Denmark) Aalborg	Palau Blaugrana, Barcelona; Attendance: 3,014; Referees: Cohen, Peretz (ISR)
22 March 2015; 18:50	Sigurðsson 6	(14–9)	Berggren 5	Palau Blaugrana, Barcelona; Attendance: 3,014; Referees: Cohen, Peretz (ISR)
22 March 2015; 18:50	3× (yellow card) 2× (suspension)	Report	3× (yellow card) 8× (suspension)	Palau Blaugrana, Barcelona; Attendance: 3,014; Referees: Cohen, Peretz (ISR)

Barcelona won 60–33 on aggregate.

22 March 2015; 19:30	THW Kiel (Germany)	33–28	(Germany) Flensburg-Handewitt	Sparkassen-Arena, Kiel; Attendance: 10,285; Referees: Dinu, Din (ROU)
22 March 2015; 19:30	Vujin 6	(16–10)	Jakobsson 6	Sparkassen-Arena, Kiel; Attendance: 10,285; Referees: Dinu, Din (ROU)
22 March 2015; 19:30	3× (yellow card) 4× (suspension)	Report	3× (yellow card) 7× (suspension)	Sparkassen-Arena, Kiel; Attendance: 10,285; Referees: Dinu, Din (ROU)

THW Kiel won 63–49 on aggregate.

== Quarterfinals ==
The draw was held on 24 March 2015 at 11:30 local time at Vienna.

=== Seedings ===
The seedings were published on 23 March 2015.

The first legs were played on 8–12 April and the second legs on 15–19 April 2015.

Pot 1	Pot 2
(Germany) THW Kiel (Spain) Barcelona (Hungary) MKB-MVM Veszprém (Poland) Vive Tauron Kielce	(France) Paris Saint-Germain (Croatia) Zagreb (Hungary) MOL-Pick Szeged (North Macedonia) Vardar

==== Matches ====
Team 1	Agg.	Team 2	1st leg	2nd leg
Zagreb (Croatia)	44–68	(Spain) Barcelona	23–25	21–43
Vardar (North Macedonia)	51–55	(Poland) Vive Tauron Kielce	20–22	31–33
Paris Saint-Germain (France)	52–58	(Hungary) MKB-MVM Veszprém	24–24	28–34
MOL-Pick Szeged (Hungary)	54–60	(Germany) THW Kiel	31–29	23–32

===== First leg =====
9 April 2015; 20:10	Zagreb (Croatia)	23–25	(Spain) Barcelona	Arena Zagreb, Zagreb; Attendance: 15,200; Referees: Dobrovits, Tájok (HUN)
9 April 2015; 20:10	Stepančić 9	(10–14)	Karabatić 6	Arena Zagreb, Zagreb; Attendance: 15,200; Referees: Dobrovits, Tájok (HUN)
9 April 2015; 20:10	3× (yellow card) 3× (suspension)	Report	2× (yellow card) 2× (suspension)	Arena Zagreb, Zagreb; Attendance: 15,200; Referees: Dobrovits, Tájok (HUN)

11 April 2015; 19:00	Vardar (North Macedonia)	20–22	(Poland) Vive Tauron Kielce	Jane Sandanski Arena, Skopje; Attendance: 5,500; Referees: Stark, Ștefan (ROU)
11 April 2015; 19:00	Gorbok 5	(11–11)	Štrlek 5	Jane Sandanski Arena, Skopje; Attendance: 5,500; Referees: Stark, Ștefan (ROU)
11 April 2015; 19:00	3× (yellow card) 3× (suspension)	Report	3× (yellow card) 5× (suspension)	Jane Sandanski Arena, Skopje; Attendance: 5,500; Referees: Stark, Ștefan (ROU)

12 April 2015; 17:30	Paris Saint-Germain (France)	24–24	(Hungary) MKB-MVM Veszprém	Halle Georges Carpentier, Paris; Attendance: 2,780; Referees: Horáček, Novotný (CZE)
12 April 2015; 17:30	Hansen 8	(10–12)	Ilić 8	Halle Georges Carpentier, Paris; Attendance: 2,780; Referees: Horáček, Novotný (CZE)
12 April 2015; 17:30	3× (yellow card) 1× (suspension)	Report	3× (yellow card) 5× (suspension)	Halle Georges Carpentier, Paris; Attendance: 2,780; Referees: Horáček, Novotný (CZE)

12 April 2015; 19:15	MOL-Pick Szeged (Hungary)	31–29	(Germany) THW Kiel	Újszegedi Sportcsarnok, Szeged; Attendance: 3,200; Referees: Gousko, Repkin (BLR)
12 April 2015; 19:15	Bombač 6	(17–15)	Weinhold 5	Újszegedi Sportcsarnok, Szeged; Attendance: 3,200; Referees: Gousko, Repkin (BLR)
12 April 2015; 19:15	3× (yellow card) 2× (suspension)	Report	3× (yellow card) 3× (suspension)	Újszegedi Sportcsarnok, Szeged; Attendance: 3,200; Referees: Gousko, Repkin (BLR)

===== Second leg =====
18 April 2015; 18:30	Barcelona (Spain)	43–21	(Croatia) Zagreb	Palau Blaugrana, Barcelona; Attendance: 5,614; Referees: Geipel, Helbig (GER)
18 April 2015; 18:30	Lazarov 9	(23–10)	Obranović 4	Palau Blaugrana, Barcelona; Attendance: 5,614; Referees: Geipel, Helbig (GER)
18 April 2015; 18:30	1× (yellow card) 1× (suspension)	Report	3× (yellow card) 4× (suspension)	Palau Blaugrana, Barcelona; Attendance: 5,614; Referees: Geipel, Helbig (GER)

Barcelona won 68–44 on aggregate.

19 April 2015; 15:30	Vive Tauron Kielce (Poland)	33–31	(North Macedonia) Vardar	Hala Legionów, Kielce; Attendance: 4,200; Referees: Gjeding, Hansen (DEN)
19 April 2015; 15:30	Bielecki 8	(16–14)	Dujshebaev 9	Hala Legionów, Kielce; Attendance: 4,200; Referees: Gjeding, Hansen (DEN)
19 April 2015; 15:30	3× (yellow card) 6× (suspension) 1× (red card)	Report	3× (yellow card) 4× (suspension)	Hala Legionów, Kielce; Attendance: 4,200; Referees: Gjeding, Hansen (DEN)

Vive Tauron Kielce won 55–51 on aggregate.

19 April 2015; 17:30	MKB-MVM Veszprém (Hungary)	34–28	(France) Paris Saint-Germain	Veszprém Aréna, Veszprém; Attendance: 5,019; Referees: Nikolić, Stojković (SRB)
19 April 2015; 17:30	Ilić 7	(16–12)	Hansen 15	Veszprém Aréna, Veszprém; Attendance: 5,019; Referees: Nikolić, Stojković (SRB)
19 April 2015; 17:30	3× (yellow card) 5× (suspension)	Report	3× (yellow card) 4× (suspension)	Veszprém Aréna, Veszprém; Attendance: 5,019; Referees: Nikolić, Stojković (SRB)

MKB-MVM Veszprém won 58–52 on aggregate.

19 April 2015; 19:30	THW Kiel (Germany)	31–23	(Hungary) MOL-Pick Szeged	Sparkassen-Arena, Kiel; Attendance: 10,285; Referees: Togstad, Kristiansen (NOR)
19 April 2015; 19:30	Jícha 8	(18–10)	Källman 5	Sparkassen-Arena, Kiel; Attendance: 10,285; Referees: Togstad, Kristiansen (NOR)
19 April 2015; 19:30	3× (yellow card) 3× (suspension)	Report	3× (yellow card) 5× (suspension) 1× (red card)	Sparkassen-Arena, Kiel; Attendance: 10,285; Referees: Togstad, Kristiansen (NOR)

THW Kiel won 60–54 on aggregate.

== Final four ==
The draw was held on 21 April 2015.

=== Bracket ===
Semi-finals
30 May
(Spain) Barcelona	33
(Poland) Vive Tauron Kielce	28
30 May
(Germany) THW Kiel	27
(Hungary) MKB-MVM Veszprém	31

Final
31 May
(Spain) Barcelona	28
(Hungary) MKB-MVM Veszprém	23
Third place
31 May
(Poland) Vive Tauron Kielce	28
(Germany) THW Kiel	26

==== Semifinals ====
30 May 2015; 15:15	Barcelona (Spain)	33–28	(Poland) Vive Tauron Kielce	Lanxess Arena, Cologne; Attendance: 19,250; Referees: Stoļarovs, Līcis (LAT)
30 May 2015; 15:15	Karabatić 8	(16–14)	Bielecki 7	Lanxess Arena, Cologne; Attendance: 19,250; Referees: Stoļarovs, Līcis (LAT)
30 May 2015; 15:15	3× (yellow card) 2× (suspension)	Report	2× (yellow card) 4× (suspension)	Lanxess Arena, Cologne; Attendance: 19,250; Referees: Stoļarovs, Līcis (LAT)

30 May 2015; 18:00	THW Kiel (Germany)	27–31	(Hungary) MKB-MVM Veszprém	Lanxess Arena, Cologne; Attendance: 19,250; Referees: Nikolov, Nachevski (MKD)
30 May 2015; 18:00	Pálmarsson 9	(13–13)	Ilić 8	Lanxess Arena, Cologne; Attendance: 19,250; Referees: Nikolov, Nachevski (MKD)
30 May 2015; 18:00	3× (yellow card) 6× (suspension)	Report	3× (yellow card) 6× (suspension) 1× (red card)	Lanxess Arena, Cologne; Attendance: 19,250; Referees: Nikolov, Nachevski (MKD)

==== Third-place game ====
31 May 2015; 15:15	Vive Tauron Kielce (Poland)	28–26	(Germany) THW Kiel	Lanxess Arena, Cologne; Attendance: 19,250; Referees: Johansson, Kliko (SWE)
31 May 2015; 15:15	Bielecki 5	(12–12)	Vujin 9	Lanxess Arena, Cologne; Attendance: 19,250; Referees: Johansson, Kliko (SWE)
31 May 2015; 15:15	3× (yellow card) 2× (suspension) 1× (red card)	Report	3× (yellow card) 5× (suspension) 1× (red card)	Lanxess Arena, Cologne; Attendance: 19,250; Referees: Johansson, Kliko (SWE)

==== Final ====
31 May 2015; 18:00	Barcelona (Spain)	28–23	(Hungary) MKB-MVM Veszprém	Lanxess Arena, Cologne; Attendance: 19,250; Referees: Dinu, Din (ROU)
31 May 2015; 18:00	Karabatić, Sigurðsson 6	(14–10)	Nagy 8	Lanxess Arena, Cologne; Attendance: 19,250; Referees: Dinu, Din (ROU)
31 May 2015; 18:00	3× (yellow card) 5× (suspension)	Report	3× (yellow card) 5× (suspension)	Lanxess Arena, Cologne; Attendance: 19,250; Referees: Dinu, Din (ROU)
