= 2014–15 EHF Champions League =

European handball tournament

EHF Champions League
- 2014–15
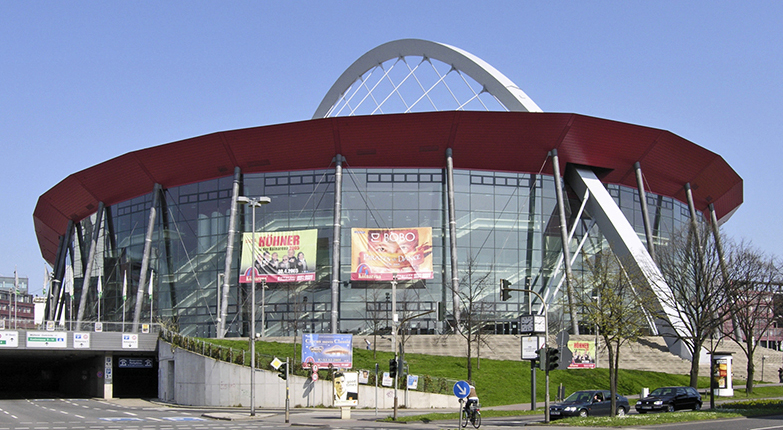
- The Lanxess Arena hosts the final

Tournament information
- Sport: Handball
- Location: Lanxess Arena (FINAL4)
- Dates: 6 September 2014–31 May 2015
- Administrator: EHF
- Teams: 33 (qualification stage); 24 (group stage); 16 (knockout stage)

Final positions
- Champions: (Spain) Barcelona
- Runner-up: (Hungary) MKB-MVM Veszprém

Tournament statistics
- Matches played: 148
- Goals scored: 7932 (53.59 per match)
- Attendance: 691,601 (4,673 per match)
- Top scorer(s): (Serbia) Momir Ilić (114 goals)

The 2014–15 VELUX EHF Champions League was the 55th edition of Europe's premier club handball competition and the 22nd edition under the current EHF Champions League format. SG Flensburg-Handewitt were the defending champions.

FC Barcelona Handbol defeated Veszprém KC 28–23 in the final to win their eighth EHF Champions League title. The record winners of the European top flight also claimed one trophy of the Champions Cup (the EHF Champions League forerunner) in 1991.

== Overview ==
=== Team allocation ===
League positions of the previous season shown in parentheses (TH: Title holders). 21 teams were directly qualified for the group stage.

Group stage
(Germany) Flensburg-Handewitt^{TH} (3rd)	(France) Paris Saint-Germain (2nd)	(Hungary) MOL-Pick Szeged (2nd)	(Poland) Vive Tauron Kielce (1st)
(Germany) THW Kiel (1st)	(France) Montpellier (3rd)	(Russia) Chekhovskiye Medvedi (1st)	(Poland) Wisła Płock (2nd)
(Germany) Rhein-Neckar Löwen (2nd)	(Denmark) KIF Kolding København (1st)	(Switzerland) Kadetten Schaffhausen (1st)	(Sweden) Alingsås HK (1st)
(Spain) Barcelona (1st)	(Denmark) Aalborg (2nd)	(Croatia) Zagreb (1st)	
(Spain) Logroño (2nd)	(Slovenia) Celje (1st)	(North Macedonia) Metalurg Skopje (1st)	
(France) Dunkerque (1st)	(Hungary) MKB-MVM Veszprém (1st)	(North Macedonia) Vardar (2nd)	
Qualification tournament
(Belarus) Meshkov Brest (1st)	(Norway) Haslum HK (CW)	(Turkey) Beşiktaş (1st)	(Netherlands) Targos Bevo HC (1st)
(Romania) HCM Constanța (1st)	(Serbia) Vojvodina (1st)	(Slovakia) Tatran Prešov (1st)	(Belgium) Initia Hasselt (1st)
(Portugal) Porto (1st)	(Ukraine) Motor Zaporizhzhia (1st)	(Austria) Alpla HC Hard (1st)	(Italy) Junior Fasano (1st)

=== Round and draw dates ===
Draws were held at the European Handball Federation headquarters in Vienna, Austria and the only exception was the VELUX EHF FINAL4 draw in the Botanic Garden of Cologne, Germany.

Phase	Round	Draw date	First leg	Second leg
Qualifying	Qualification tournaments	26 June 2014	5–7 September 2014	
Group stage	Matchday 1	27 June 2014	24–28 September 2014	
Group stage	Matchday 2	27 June 2014	1–5 October 2014	
Group stage	Matchday 3	27 June 2014	8–12 October 2014	
Group stage	Matchday 4	27 June 2014	15–19 October 2014	
Group stage	Matchday 5	27 June 2014	12–16 November 2014	
Group stage	Matchday 6	27 June 2014	19–23 November 2014	
Group stage	Matchday 7	27 June 2014	26–30 November 2014	
Group stage	Matchday 8	27 June 2014	3–6 December 2014	
Group stage	Matchday 9	27 June 2014	11–15 February 2015	
Group stage	Matchday 10	27 June 2014	18–22 February 2015	
Knockout stage	Last 16	24 February 2015	11–15 March 2015	18–22 March 2015
Knockout stage	Quarter-final	24 March 2015	8–12 April 2015	15–19 April 2015
Final Four (Cologne)	Semifinals	21 April 2015	30 May 2015 at Lanxess Arena	
Final Four (Cologne)	Final	21 April 2015	31 May 2015 at Lanxess Arena	

== Qualification stage ==
Twelve teams took part in the qualification tournaments. They were drawn into three groups of four teams, where they played a semifinal and a final or third place match. The winners of the qualification tournaments, played on 6–7 September 2014, qualified for the group stage, while the eliminated teams were transferred to the 2014–15 EHF Cup. The draw took place on 26 June 2014, at 14:00 local time, in Vienna, Austria.

=== Seedings ===
The seedings were published on 23 June 2014.

Pot 1	Pot 2	Pot 3	Pot 4
(Ukraine) Motor Zaporizhzhia (Belarus) Meshkov Brest (Romania) HCM Constanța	(Serbia) Vojvodina (Portugal) Porto (Norway) Haslum HK	(Slovakia) Tatran Prešov (Austria) Alpla HC Hard (Turkey) Beşiktaş	(Netherlands) Targos Bevo HC (Belgium) Initia Hasselt (Italy) Junior Fasano

=== Qualification tournament 1 ===
Semifinals
6 September
(Belarus) Meshkov Brest	36
(Netherlands) Targos Bevo HC	23
6 September
(Serbia) Vojvodina	21
(Slovakia) Tatran Prešov	25

Final
7 September
(Belarus) Meshkov Brest	26
(Slovakia) Tatran Prešov	24
Third place game
7 September
(Netherlands) Targos Bevo HC	25
(Serbia) Vojvodina	30

=== Qualification tournament 2 ===
Semifinals
5 September
(Ukraine) Motor Zaporizhzhia	36
(Italy) Junior Fasano	20
5 September
(Portugal) Porto	29
(Austria) Alpla HC Hard	25

Final
6 September
(Ukraine) Motor Zaporizhzhia	30
(Portugal) Porto	26
Third place game
6 September
(Italy) Junior Fasano	26
(Austria) Alpla HC Hard	35

=== Qualification tournament 3 ===
Semifinals
6 September
(Romania) HCM Constanța	29
(Belgium) Initia Hasselt	20
6 September
(Norway) Haslum HK	22
(Turkey) Beşiktaş	29

Final
7 September
(Romania) HCM Constanța	25
(Turkey) Beşiktaş	34
Third place game
7 September
(Belgium) Initia Hasselt	26
(Norway) Haslum HK	35

== Group stage ==
Location of teams of the 2014–15 EHF Champions League group stage.
Red: Group A; Green: Group B; Blue: Group C; Yellow: Group D.

24 teams were drawn into four groups of six teams, where they played each other twice. The top four teams advanced to the knockout stage. The draw took place on 27 June 2014, at 18:00 local time, in Vienna, Austria.

=== Seedings ===
The seedings were published on 23 June 2014.

Pot 1	Pot 2	Pot 3
(Germany) THW Kiel (Spain) Barcelona (Hungary) MKB-MVM Veszprém (Poland) Vive Tauron Kielce	(Denmark) KIF Kolding København (North Macedonia) Metalurg Skopje (Slovenia) Celje (France) Dunkerque	(Croatia) Zagreb (Russia) Chekhovskiye Medvedi (Switzerland) Kadetten Schaffhausen (Sweden) Alingsås HK

Pot 4	Pot 5	Pot 6
(Germany) Rhein-Neckar Löwen (Spain) Logroño (Hungary) MOL-Pick Szeged (Poland) Wisła Płock	(Germany) Flensburg-Handewitt (Denmark) Aalborg (North Macedonia) Vardar (France) Paris Saint-Germain	(France) Montpellier (Belarus) Meshkov Brest (Ukraine) Motor Zaporizhzhia (Turkey) Beşiktaş

Key to colours in group tables
Top four placed teams advanced to the last 16

=== Group A ===
Team	Pld	W	D	L	GF	GA	GD	Pts	KIE	PSG	ZAG	LOG	MSH	MET
(Germany) THW Kiel	10	9	0	1	322	259	+63	18	—	33–29	34–27	34–32	33–22	35–16
(France) Paris Saint-Germain	10	6	0	4	297	266	+31	12	25–27	—	27–22	32–25	36–25	35–24
(Croatia) Zagreb	10	6	0	4	241	248	−7	12	27–25	25–24	—	31–30	25–23	19–17
(Spain) Logroño	10	4	1	5	305	305	0	9	30–34	35–33	22–21	—	39–31	31–26
(Belarus) Meshkov Brest	10	2	2	6	267	293	−26	6	24–25	28–29	26–22	33–33	—	28–24
(North Macedonia) Metalurg Skopje	10	1	1	8	233	294	−61	3	27–42	22–27	20–22	29–28	27–27	—

=== Group B ===
Team	Pld	W	D	L	GF	GA	GD	Pts	BAR	KOL	PŁO	FLE	ALI	BJK
(Spain) Barcelona	10	8	1	1	338	280	+58	17	—	33–27	30–25	36–27	42–29	35–25
(Denmark) KIF Kolding København	10	6	2	2	292	273	+19	14	27–27	—	30–30	35–21	34–33	34–31
(Poland) Wisła Płock	10	6	1	3	288	280	+8	13	34–31	28–29	—	31–29	28–25	28–19
(Germany) Flensburg-Handewitt	10	6	0	4	288	277	+11	12	33–37	27–20	35–28	—	31–21	31–27
(Sweden) Alingsås HK	10	1	0	9	252	298	−46	2	28–38	19–23	22–23	22–27	—	27–24
(Turkey) Beşiktaş	10	1	0	9	253	303	−50	2	25–29	24–33	30–33	20–27	28–26	—

=== Group C ===
Team	Pld	W	D	L	GF	GA	GD	Pts	VES	VAR	RNL	MON	CEL	CHE
(Hungary) MKB-MVM Veszprém	10	9	0	1	300	262	+38	18	—	32–24	27–24	30–29	29–26	38–31
(North Macedonia) Vardar	10	7	1	2	313	289	+24	15	23–24	—	28–25	30–26	34–32	39–28
(Germany) Rhein-Neckar Löwen	10	6	0	4	302	282	+20	12	32–25	28–35	—	35–24	31–27	34–29
(France) Montpellier	10	3	2	5	293	317	−24	8	20–34	34–34	29–33	—	35–29	32–32
(Slovenia) Celje	10	3	0	7	284	293	−9	6	21–24	26–27	32–28	27–30	—	29–25
(Russia) Chekhovskiye Medvedi	10	0	1	9	300	349	−49	1	32–37	34–39	26–32	33–34	30–35	—

=== Group D ===
Team	Pld	W	D	L	GF	GA	GD	Pts	KSK	SZE	DUN	AAL	ZAP	KAD
(Poland) Vive Tauron Kielce	10	10	0	0	312	271	+41	20	—	37–32	36–32	33–26	30–26	33–24
(Hungary) MOL-Pick Szeged	10	6	1	3	276	264	+12	13	26–27	—	23–21	23–23	27–26	34–24
(France) Dunkerque	10	4	0	6	257	263	−6	8	25–28	24–25	—	21–26	31–29	29–25
(Denmark) Aalborg	10	2	3	5	256	269	−13	7	25–27	25–28	25–28	—	30–36	23–23
(Ukraine) Motor Zaporizhzhia	10	3	0	7	283	284	−1	6	27–28	25–29	21–23	25–28	—	31–26
(Switzerland) Kadetten Schaffhausen	10	2	2	6	264	297	−33	6	28–33	32–29	25–23	25–25	32–37	—

== Knockout stage ==
The top four placed teams of each group advance to the knockout stage. In the round of 16 and the quarterfinals, the teams will play a home-and away series to determine the four participants of the final four, which then determines the winner.

=== Last 16 ===
The draw was held on 24 February 2015 at 12:30 in Vienna, Austria. The first legs were played on 11–15 March and the second legs on 18–22 March 2015.

==== Seedings ====
The seedings were published on 23 February 2015.

A team from Pot 1 will face a team from Pot 4, a Pot 2 team will play against a team from Pot 3.

Pot 1	Pot 2	Pot 3	Pot 4
(Germany) THW Kiel (Spain) Barcelona (Hungary) MKB-MVM Veszprém (Poland) Vive Tauron Kielce	(France) Paris Saint-Germain (Denmark) KIF Kolding København (North Macedonia) Vardar (Hungary) MOL-Pick Szeged	(Croatia) Zagreb (Poland) Wisła Płock (Germany) Rhein-Neckar Löwen (France) Dunkerque	(Spain) Logroño (Germany) Flensburg-Handewitt (France) Montpellier (Denmark) Aalborg

==== Matches ====
Team 1	Agg.	Team 2	1st leg	2nd leg
Logroño (Spain)	54–68	(Hungary) MKB-MVM Veszprém	23–31	31–37
Montpellier (France)	58–60	(Poland) Vive Tauron Kielce	25–29	33–31
Aalborg (Denmark)	33–60	(Spain) Barcelona	11–31	22–29
Flensburg-Handewitt (Germany)	49–63	(Germany) THW Kiel	21–30	28–33
Dunkerque (France)	43–46	(France) Paris Saint-Germain	21–23	22–23
Wisła Płock (Poland)	52–57	(North Macedonia) Vardar	32–26	20–31
Rhein-Neckar Löwen (Germany)	59–65	(Hungary) MOL-Pick Szeged	30–34	29–31
Zagreb (Croatia)	43–40	(Denmark) KIF Kolding København	22–17	21–23

=== Quarterfinals ===
The draw was held on 24 March 2015 at 11:30 in Vienna, Austria. The first legs were played on 8–12 April and the second legs on 15–19 April 2015.

==== Seedings ====
The seedings were published on 23 March 2015.

Pot 1	Pot 2
(Germany) THW Kiel (Spain) Barcelona (Hungary) MKB-MVM Veszprém (Poland) Vive Tauron Kielce	(France) Paris Saint-Germain (Croatia) Zagreb (Hungary) MOL-Pick Szeged (North Macedonia) Vardar

==== Matches ====
Team 1	Agg.	Team 2	1st leg	2nd leg
Zagreb (Croatia)	44–68	(Spain) Barcelona	23–25	21–43
Vardar (North Macedonia)	51–55	(Poland) Vive Tauron Kielce	20–22	31–33
Paris Saint-Germain (France)	52–58	(Hungary) MKB-MVM Veszprém	24–24	28–34
MOL-Pick Szeged (Hungary)	54–60	(Germany) THW Kiel	31–29	23–31

=== Final four ===
The draw was held on 21 April 2015.

The final four was held on 30–31 May 2015 at the Lanxess Arena, Cologne.

Semi-finals
30 May
(Spain) Barcelona	33
(Poland) Vive Tauron Kielce	28
30 May
(Germany) THW Kiel	27
(Hungary) MKB-MVM Veszprém	31

Final
31 May
(Spain) Barcelona	28
(Hungary) MKB-MVM Veszprém	23
Third place
31 May
(Poland) Vive Tauron Kielce	28
(Germany) THW Kiel	26

== Top goalscorers ==
Statistics exclude qualifying round.

Rank	Player	Team	Goals
1	(Serbia) Momir Ilić	(Hungary) Veszprém	114
2	(North Macedonia) Kiril Lazarov	(Spain) Barcelona	106
3	(Denmark) Mikkel Hansen	(France) Paris	103
4	(Poland) Karol Bielecki	(Poland) Kielce	92
5	(Russia) Timur Dibirov	(North Macedonia) Vardar	78
6	(Hungary) Zsolt Balogh	(Hungary) Szeged	76
6	(Serbia) Marko Vujin	(Germany) Kiel	76
8	(France) Nikola Karabatić	(Spain) Barcelona	75
9	(Croatia) Igor Karačić	(North Macedonia) Vardar	74
10	(Spain) Alex Dujshebaev	(North Macedonia) Vardar	73

== Awards ==
The All-star team of the Champions League 2014/15:

Position	Player
Goalkeeper	(Hungary) Roland Mikler (MKB-MVM Veszprém)
Right wing	(Spain) Víctor Tomás (Barcelona)
Right back	(North Macedonia) Kiril Lazarov (Barcelona)
Centre back	(Denmark) Mikkel Hansen (Paris Saint-Germain)
Left back	(France) Nikola Karabatić (Barcelona)
Left wing	(Germany) Uwe Gensheimer (Rhein-Neckar Löwen)
Pivot	(Croatia) Renato Sulić (MKB-MVM Veszprém)
Best defender	(Denmark) Rene Toft Hansen (THW Kiel)
Best coach	(Spain) Talant Dujshebaev (Vive Tauron Kielce)

Best Coach: (Spain) Talant Dujshebaev

== See also ==
- 2014–15 EHF Cup
- 2014–15 EHF Challenge Cup
