= Şehit Polis Recep Topaloğlu Sports Hall =

Indoor arena in Izmit, Kocaeli, Turkey

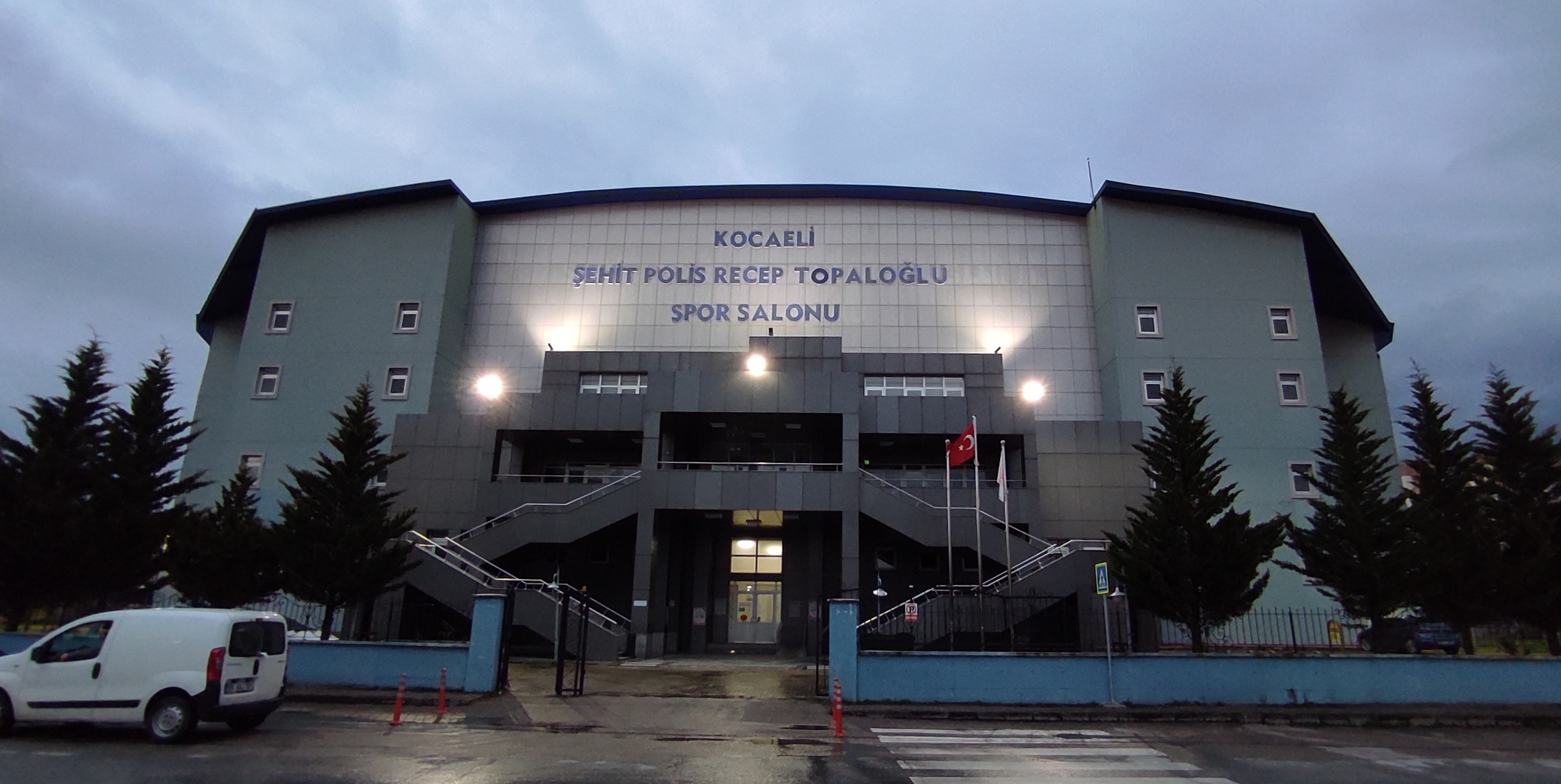
- Interactive map of Şehit Polis Recep Topaloğlu Sports Hall
- Full name: Şehit Polis Recep Topaloğlu Spor Salonu
- Location: Yahya Kaptan Mah. Kızılay Sok. 7, İzmit, Turkey
- Coordinates: 40°45′59″N 29°58′43″E
- Capacity: 5,000

Construction
- Opened: 6 August 2012; 14 years ago

Tenant
- Körfez Basket 2026-present

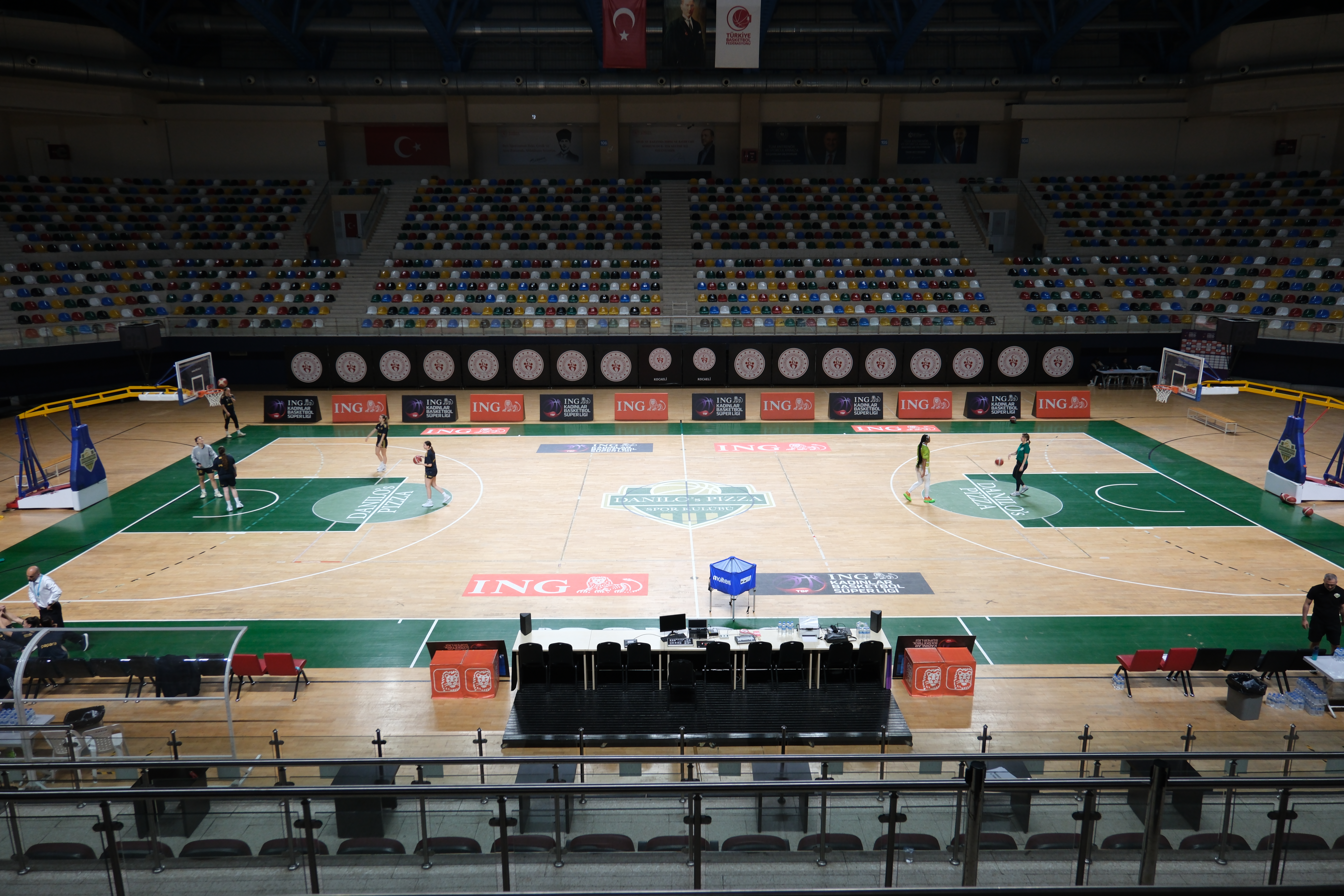

Şehit Polis Recep Topaloğlu Sports Hall (Turkish: Şehit Polis Recep Topaloğlu Spor Salonu) is a multi-purpose indoor arena located in Izmit of Kocaeli Province, Turkey.

The venue is used for competitions and trainings of a wide variety of sports branches including basketball, volleyball, handball, fencing, table tennis, wrestling, judo, karate, kick boxing and taekwondo. Opened officially on 6 August 2012, it has a seating capacity of 5,000.

The sports hall is named in honor of Recep Topaloğlu, a swimming instructor as well as amateur footballer from İzmit, and member of the Police Special Operation Force, who was killed in action during a clash with Kurdish militants on Mount Judi in Şırnak Province, southeastern Anatolia on 21 March 2012.

== Events hosted ==
- 2012–13 Turkish Cup Basketball
- 2014–15 EHF Champions League group stage
- 2015 Boys' Youth European Volleyball Championship
