= Pontus Johansson =

Swedish ice hockey player (born 1991)

- Born: September 22, 1991 (age 34) Uppsala, Sweden
- Height: 6 ft 4 in (193 cm)
- Weight: 212 lb (96 kg; 15 st 2 lb)
- Position: Right wing
- Shot: Right
- Played for: Timrå IK
- NHL draft: Undrafted
- Playing career: 2010–2024

Pontus Johansson (born September 22, 1991) is a Swedish former professional ice hockey player.

Johansson played one game for Timrå IK in the Elitserien during the 2010–11 Elitserien season. He played 46 games in the HockeyAllsvenskan with Almtuna IS during the 2019–20 season, however played the majority of his 15 year professional career in the Hockeyettan.

On 11 June 2024, Johansson announced his retirement from professional hockey after playing the last four seasons with Bodens HF.
