= Marko Buvinić =

Croatian handball player (born 1992)

Personal information
- Nationality: Croatian
- Born: 28 June 1992 (age 34) Pula, Croatia
- Height: 1.90 m (6 ft 3 in)

Sport
- Sport: Handball
- Position: Right Back/Wing
- Current club: RK Umag

Senior clubs
- Years: Team
- 2009–2012: (Croatia) RK Umag
- 2012–2015: (Croatia) RK Poreč
- 2015–2016: (North Macedonia) RK Metalurg Skopje
- 2016–2017: (Austria) Bregenz Handball
- 2017–2021: (Croatia) RK Nexe Našice
- 2021–2022: (Romania) HC Dobrogea Sud
- 2023–: (Croatia) RK Umag
National team
- Years: Team
- –: Croatia

Marko Buvinić (Macedonian: Марко Бувиниќ) (born 28 June 1992) is a Croatian handball player who plays for RK Umag.
