= Sandro Obranović =

Croatian handball player (born 1992)

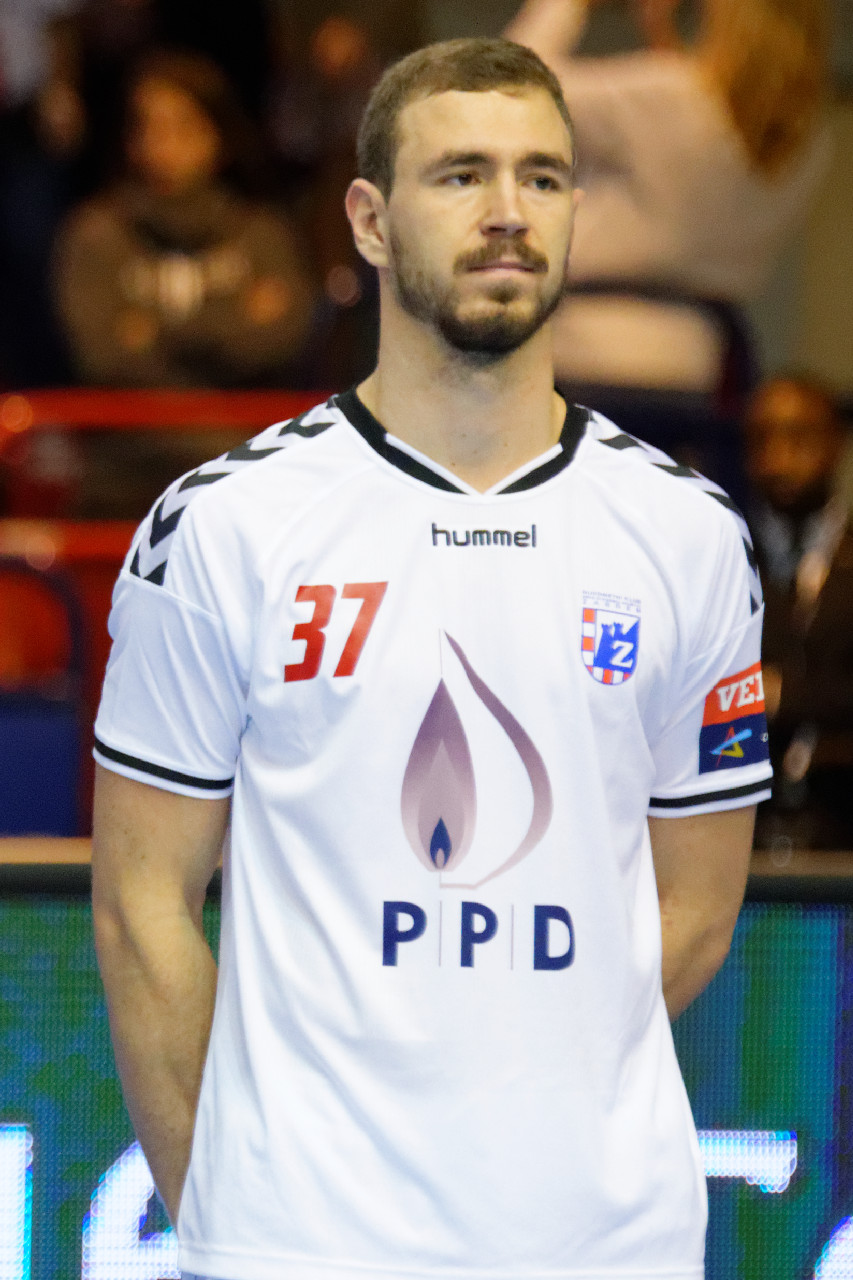

Personal information
- Nationality: Croatian
- Born: 18 October 1992 (age 34) Karlovac, Croatia
- Height: 1.95 m (6 ft 5 in)

Sport
- Sport: Handball
- Position: Centre back
- Number: 25

Youth career
- Years: Team
- 2008–2012: HRK Karlovac

Senior clubs
- Years: Team
- 2012–2013: RK Nexe Našice
- 2013–2017: RK Zagreb
- 2016–2017: → SC Pick Szeged
- 2017–2018: Chambéry SMBH
- 2018–2021: HC Meshkov Brest
- 2021–2022: RK Zagreb
- 2022–2024: Kadetten Schaffhausen
- 2024: Al-Fahaheel
- 2024–: HC Kriens-Luzern
National team
Years	Team	Apps	(Gls)
2015–	Croatia	2	(1)

Sandro Obranović (born 18 October 1992) is a Croatian handball player for RK Zagreb and the Croatian national team.
