= Karol Bielecki =

Polish handball player (born 1982)

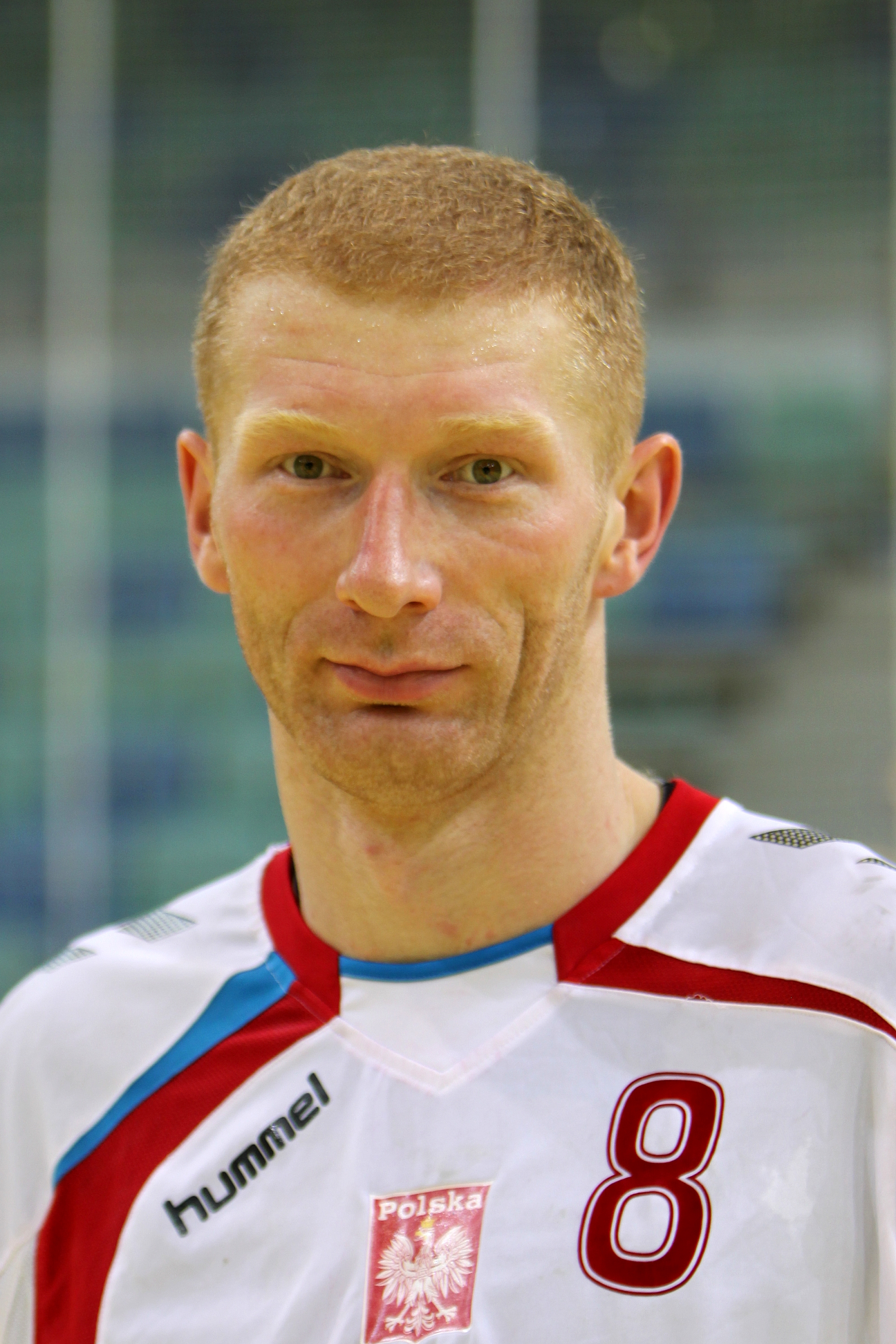

Personal information
- Nationality: Polish
- Born: 23 January 1982 (age 44) Sandomierz, Poland
- Height: 2.02 m (6 ft 8 in)

Sport
- Sport: Handball
- Position: Left back

Senior clubs
- Years: Team
- 1997–1999: Wisła Sandomierz
- 1999–2004: Vive Targi Kielce
- 2004–2007: SC Magdeburg
- 2007–2012: Rhein-Neckar Löwen
- 2012–2018: PGE Vive Kielce
National team
| Years | Team | Apps | (Gls) |
| 2002–2017 | Poland | 255 | (955) |
Medal record
World Championship
| Silver medal – second place | 2007 Germany |
| Bronze medal – third place | 2009 Croatia |
| Bronze medal – third place | 2015 Qatar |

Karol Bielecki (born 23 January 1982) is a Polish former handball player who played for the Polish national team.

== Career ==
He played for the national team, winning a silver medal in the World Handball Championship in 2007 and a bronze in 2009 and 2015. He announced his retirement from the national team on 13 April 2012, following the unsuccessful Olympic campaign of Poland.

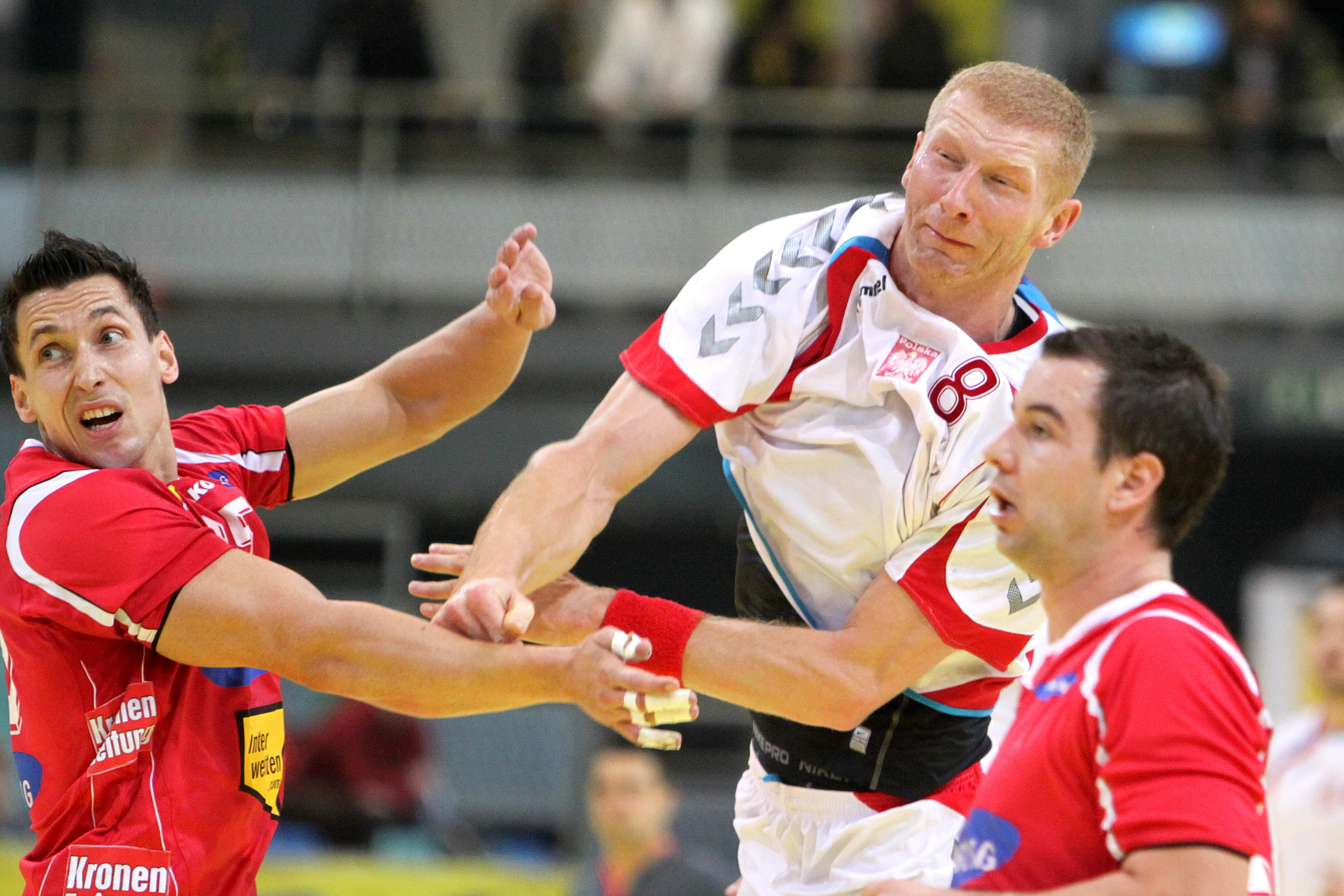
Karol Bielecki during a match with the national team

On 11 June 2010, Bielecki received severe eye injury during a friendly match against Croatia. After additional tests and eye surgeries, it was determined that his left eye will remain blind. Although he first said that his years as a player were over, he decided to continue his career. He then played in special goggles and had scored 11 goals in his Bundesliga debut after the injury.

On 1 February 2015, Poland, including Bielecki, won the bronze medal of the 2015 World Championship.

He participated at the 2016 Summer Olympics in Rio de Janeiro, where he was the topscorer in the men's handball tournament.

On 20 May 2018, he announced his retirement as a player.

== Achievements ==
PGE Vive Kielce

- Polish Superliga: 2002–03, 2012–13, 2013–14, 2014–15, 2015–16, 2016–17, 2017–18
- Polish Cup: 2009, 2013, 2014, 2015
- EHF Champions League: 2015–16

SC Magdeburg

- EHF Cup: 2006–07

Individual

- Topscorer of the men's handball tournament at the 2016 Summer Olympics in Rio de Janeiro (55 goals)

== State awards ==
- 2007 Gold Cross of Merit
- 2015 Knight's Cross of Polonia Restituta

Olympic Games
| Preceded by Agnieszka Radwańska | Flagbearer for Poland; Rio de Janeiro 2016 | Succeeded by Maja Włoszczowska & Paweł Korzeniowski |
