= 2017 World Men's Handball Championship =

Championnat du monde masculin de handball 2017

Tournament details
- Host country: France
- Venues: 8 (in 8 host cities)
- Dates: 11–29 January
- Teams: 24 (from 5 confederations)

Final positions
- Champions: France (6th title)
- Runners-up: Norway
- Third place: Slovenia
- Fourth place: Croatia

Tournament statistics
- Matches played: 84
- Goals scored: 4,643 (55.27 per match)
- Attendance: 553,833 (6,593 per match)
- Top scorer: Kiril Lazarov (MKD) (50 goals)

Awards
- Best player: Nikola Karabatić (FRA)

The 2017 IHF World Men's Handball Championship was the 25th event hosted by the International Handball Federation. The event was held in France from 11 to 29 January 2017.

France, in a clean sweep, defended their title by defeating Norway 33–26 in the final, which secured France their sixth title. Slovenia defeated Croatia 31–30 to capture the bronze medal. Norway (from a wildcard) and Slovenia earned their first World Championship medals ever.

The championship set a record of attendance in total of 540,000 spectators with 23 matches being sold out and with a venue record of 28,010 at both of France's knock-out matches in Lille.

== Venues ==
The championship was played at eight venues in Paris-Bercy, Rouen, Nantes, Metz, Albertville, Montpellier, Lille, and Brest. All the venue capacities are the capacity for handball events.

Lille	Paris	Nantes
Stade Pierre-Mauroy	AccorHotels Arena	Hall XXL
Capacity: 27,500	Capacity: 15,700	Capacity: 10,800
Montpellier	2017 World Men's Handball Championship is located in France	
Park&Suites Arena	2017 World Men's Handball Championship is located in France	
Capacity: 9,853	2017 World Men's Handball Championship is located in France	
Albertville	2017 World Men's Handball Championship is located in France	
La halle de glace Olympique	2017 World Men's Handball Championship is located in France	
Capacity: 6,500	2017 World Men's Handball Championship is located in France	
Rouen	Metz	Brest
Kindarena	Arènes de Metz	Brest Arena
Capacity: 5,700	Capacity: 5,127	Capacity: 4,000

8 venues

== Bidding process ==
Denmark and France were bidding to host the 2017 Men's World Championships. The IHF Council awarded the Men’s and Women’s World Championships 2017 at their meeting on the fringes of the Women’s World Championships in São Paulo, Brazil on Thursday 15 December 2011.

Denmark was the co-host of the 1999 Women’s World Championship and host of the 1978 Men's World Championship. Denmark has also hosted the Women's EHF EURO twice and was awarded with the Men's EHF EURO 2014.

France hosted the Men's World Championships in 1970 and 2001 and was host of the 2007 Women's World Championship.

== Qualification ==
Twenty-four teams participated in the final tournament. France were automatically qualified as hosts. An additional automatic qualification spot was given to the defending champions, but because this was also France, the berth was given to the next best placed team from the last World Championship, losing finalists Qatar. The remaining 22 available places were for the best teams of each continental qualification tournament, the winners of an additional European qualification competition and an additional intercontinental qualification tournament.

Competition	Dates	Vacancies	Qualified
Host nation	15 December 2011	1	France
2015 World Championship	15 January – 1 February 2015	1	Qatar
2016 Asian Men's Handball Championship	15–28 January 2016	3	Bahrain; Japan; Saudi Arabia
2016 African Men's Handball Championship	21–30 January 2016	3	Angola; Egypt; Tunisia
2016 European Men's Handball Championship	15–31 January 2016	3	Croatia; Germany; Spain
European qualification	4 November 2015 – 16 June 2016	9	Belarus; Denmark; Hungary; Iceland; Macedonia; Poland; Russia; Slovenia; Sweden
2016 Pan American Men's Handball Championship	11–19 June 2016	3	Argentina; Brazil; Chile
Wildcard		1	Norway

=== Qualified teams ===
Country	Qualified as	Qualified on	Previous appearances^{1, 2}
France	Hosts	15 December 2011	20 (1954, 1958, 1961, 1964, 1967, 1970, 1978, 1990, 1993, **1995**, 1997, 1999, **2001**, 2003, 2005, 2007, **2009**, **2011**, 2013, **2015**)
Qatar	Finalist of 2015 World Championship	30 January 2015	5 (2003, 2005, 2007, 2013, 2015)
Bahrain	Semifinalist of 2016 Asian Championship	24 January 2016	1 (2011)
Japan	Semifinalist of 2016 Asian Championship	24 January 2016	12 (1961, 1964, 1967, 1970, 1974, 1978, 1982, 1990, 1995, 1997, 2005, 2011)
Saudi Arabia	Semifinalist of 2016 Asian Championship	24 January 2016	7 (1997, 1999, 2001, 2003, 2009, 2013, 2015)
Egypt	Finalist of 2016 African Championship	29 January 2016	13 (1964, 1993, 1995, 1997, 1999, 2001, 2003, 2005, 2007, 2009, 2011, 2013, 2015)
Germany	Finalist of 2016 European Championship	29 January 2016	23 (**1938**, 1954, 1958, 1961, 1964, 1967, 1970, 1974, **1978**, 1982, 1986, 1990^{3}, 1993, 1995, 1999, 2001, 2003, 2005, **2007**, 2009, 2011, 2013, 2015)
Spain	Finalist of 2016 European Championship	29 January 2016	18 (1958, 1974, 1978, 1982, 1986, 1990, 1993, 1995, 1997, 1999, 2001, 2003, **2005**, 2007, 2009, 2011, **2013**, 2015)
Tunisia	Finalist of 2016 African Championship	29 January 2016	12 (1967, 1995, 1997, 1999, 2001, 2003, 2005, 2007, 2009, 2011, 2013, 2015)
Angola	Third place at 2016 African Championship	30 January 2016	2 (2005, 2007)
Croatia	Third place at 2016 European Championship	31 January 2016	11 (1995, 1997, 1999, 2001, **2003**, 2005, 2007, 2009, 2011, 2013, 2015)
Belarus	European playoffs	15 June 2016	3 (1995, 2013, 2015)
Denmark	European playoffs	15 June 2016	21 (1938, 1954, 1958, 1961, 1964, 1967, 1970, 1974, 1978, 1982, 1986, 1993, 1995, 1999, 2003, 2005, 2007, 2009, 2011, 2013, 2015)
Hungary	European playoffs	15 June 2016	18 (1958, 1964, 1967, 1970, 1974, 1978, 1982, 1986, 1990, 1993, 1995, 1997, 1999, 2003, 2007, 2009, 2011, 2013)
Macedonia	European playoffs	15 June 2016	4 (1999, 2009, 2013, 2015)
Poland	European playoffs	15 June 2016	14 (1958, 1967, 1970, 1974, 1978, 1982, 1986, 1990, 2003, 2007, 2009, 2011, 2013, 2015)
Russia	European playoffs	15 June 2016	11 (**1993**, 1995, **1997**, 1999, 2001, 2003, 2005, 2007, 2009, 2013. 2015)
Slovenia	European playoffs	15 June 2016	7 (1995, 2001, 2003, 2005, 2007, 2013, 2015)
Sweden	European playoffs	15 June 2016	22 (1938, **1954**, **1958**, 1961, 1964, 1967, 1970, 1974, 1978, 1982, 1986, **1990**, 1993, 1995, 1997, **1999**, 2001, 2003, 2005, 2009, 2011, 2015)
Iceland	European playoffs	16 June 2016	18 (1958, 1961, 1964, 1970, 1974, 1978, 1986, 1990, 1993, 1995, 1997, 2001, 2003, 2005, 2007, 2011, 2013, 2015)
Brazil	Finalist of 2016 Pan American Championship	18 June 2016	12 (1958, 1995, 1997, 1999, 2001, 2003, 2005, 2007, 2009, 2011, 2013, 2015)
Chile	Finalist of 2016 Pan American Championship	18 June 2016	3 (2011, 2013, 2015)
Argentina	Third place at 2016 Pan American Championship	19 June 2016	10 (1997, 1999, 2001, 2003, 2005, 2007, 2009, 2011, 2013, 2015)
Norway	Wildcard	21 June 2016	13 (1958, 1961, 1964, 1967, 1970, 1993, 1997, 1999, 2001, 2005, 2007, 2009, 2011)

^{1} Bold indicates champion for that year
^{2} Italic indicates host country for that year
^{3} From both German teams only East Germany was qualified in 1990

== Draw ==
The draw was held on 23 June 2016 at 14:00 in Paris, France.

=== Seeding ===
Pot 1	Pot 2	Pot 3	Pot 4	Pot 5	Pot 6
France; Germany; Qatar; Spain	Croatia; Slovenia; Denmark; Poland	Sweden; Russia; Belarus; Macedonia	Hungary; Iceland; Brazil; Egypt	Tunisia; Chile; Bahrain; Japan	Argentina; Angola; Saudi Arabia; Norway

== Referees ==
16 referee pairs are selected:

Referees
Argentina	Julian Grillo; Sebastián Lenci
Czech Republic	Václav Horáček; Jiří Novotný
Denmark	Martin Gjeding; Mads Hansen
France	Charlotte Bonaventura; Julie Bonaventura
France	Laurent Reveret; Stevann Pichon
Germany	Lars Geipel; Marcus Helbig
Iran	Majid Kolahdouzan; Alireza Mousaviannazhad
Latvia	Renārs Līcis; Zigmārs Sondors

Referees
Lithuania	Mindaugas Gatelis; Vaidas Mažeika
Macedonia	Gjorgji Nachevski; Slave Nikolov
Montenegro	Ivan Pavićević; Miloš Ražnatović
Slovenia	Bojan Lah; David Sok
South Korea	Lee Se-ok; Koo Bon-ok
Spain	Óscar López; Ángel Ramírez
Switzerland	Arthur Brunner; Morad Salah
Tunisia	Ismail Boualloucha; Ramzi Khenissi

== Preliminary round ==
The schedule was announced on 23 September 2015.

All times are local (UTC+1).

=== Group A ===
Pos	Team	Pld	W	D	L	GF	GA	GD	Pts	Qualification
1	France (H)	5	5	0	0	154	112	+42	10	Round of 16
2	Norway	5	4	0	1	155	124	+31	8	Round of 16
3	Russia	5	3	0	2	139	136	+3	6	Round of 16
4	Brazil	5	2	0	3	121	146	−25	4	Round of 16
5	Poland	5	1	0	4	115	125	−10	2	
6	Japan	5	0	0	5	120	161	−41	0	

Source: IHF
Rules for classification: 1) points; 2) head-to-head points; 3) head-to-head goal difference; 4) head-to-head number of goals scored; 5) goal difference.
(H) Hosts

11 January 2017; 20:45	France	31–16	Brazil	AccorHotels Arena, Paris; Attendance: 15,609; Referees: Lah, Sok (SLO)
11 January 2017; 20:45	Porte 6	(17–7)	Toledo 5	AccorHotels Arena, Paris; Attendance: 15,609; Referees: Lah, Sok (SLO)
11 January 2017; 20:45	2× (yellow card) 4× (suspension)	Report	3× (yellow card) 3× (suspension)	AccorHotels Arena, Paris; Attendance: 15,609; Referees: Lah, Sok (SLO)

12 January 2017; 17:45	Russia	39–29	Japan	Exponantes – Hall XXL, Nantes; Attendance: 4,867; Referees: Kolahdouzan, Mousaviannazhad (IRN)
12 January 2017; 17:45	three players 6	(18–15)	Shida 7	Exponantes – Hall XXL, Nantes; Attendance: 4,867; Referees: Kolahdouzan, Mousaviannazhad (IRN)
12 January 2017; 17:45	2× (yellow card) 3× (suspension)	Report	3× (yellow card)	Exponantes – Hall XXL, Nantes; Attendance: 4,867; Referees: Kolahdouzan, Mousaviannazhad (IRN)

12 January 2017; 20:45	Poland	20–22	Norway	Exponantes – Hall XXL, Nantes; Attendance: 5,356; Referees: Brunner, Salah (SUI)
12 January 2017; 20:45	Daszek 7	(10–12)	Lie Hansen 6	Exponantes – Hall XXL, Nantes; Attendance: 5,356; Referees: Brunner, Salah (SUI)
12 January 2017; 20:45	2× (yellow card) 3× (suspension)	Report	4× (yellow card) 6× (suspension)	Exponantes – Hall XXL, Nantes; Attendance: 5,356; Referees: Brunner, Salah (SUI)

13 January 2017; 17:45	Japan	19–31	France	Exponantes – Hall XXL, Nantes; Attendance: 10,500; Referees: Brunner, Salah (SUI)
13 January 2017; 17:45	Uegaki 5	(9–17)	Fabregas 7	Exponantes – Hall XXL, Nantes; Attendance: 10,500; Referees: Brunner, Salah (SUI)
13 January 2017; 17:45	2× (yellow card) 2× (suspension)	Report	3× (yellow card) 2× (suspension)	Exponantes – Hall XXL, Nantes; Attendance: 10,500; Referees: Brunner, Salah (SUI)

14 January 2017; 14:45	Brazil	28–24	Poland	Exponantes – Hall XXL, Nantes; Attendance: 10,171; Referees: Horáček, Novotný (CZE)
14 January 2017; 14:45	Toledo 8	(16–11)	Paczkowski 6	Exponantes – Hall XXL, Nantes; Attendance: 10,171; Referees: Horáček, Novotný (CZE)
14 January 2017; 14:45	3× (suspension)	Report	1× (suspension)	Exponantes – Hall XXL, Nantes; Attendance: 10,171; Referees: Horáček, Novotný (CZE)

14 January 2017; 17:45	Norway	28–24	Russia	Exponantes – Hall XXL, Nantes; Attendance: 9,812; Referees: Gjeding, Hansen (DEN)
14 January 2017; 17:45	Bjørnsen 7	(15–11)	Soroka 8	Exponantes – Hall XXL, Nantes; Attendance: 9,812; Referees: Gjeding, Hansen (DEN)
14 January 2017; 17:45	2× (yellow card) 2× (suspension)	Report	3× (yellow card) 4× (suspension)	Exponantes – Hall XXL, Nantes; Attendance: 9,812; Referees: Gjeding, Hansen (DEN)

15 January 2017; 17:45	France	31–28	Norway	Exponantes – Hall XXL, Nantes; Attendance: 10,500; Referees: Kolahdouzan, Mousaviannazhad (IRN)
15 January 2017; 17:45	three players 5	(16–12)	Sagosen 7	Exponantes – Hall XXL, Nantes; Attendance: 10,500; Referees: Kolahdouzan, Mousaviannazhad (IRN)
15 January 2017; 17:45	3× (yellow card) 5× (suspension) 1× (red card)	Report	3× (yellow card) 7× (suspension) 1× (red card)	Exponantes – Hall XXL, Nantes; Attendance: 10,500; Referees: Kolahdouzan, Mousaviannazhad (IRN)

15 January 2017; 20:45	Brazil	27–24	Japan	Exponantes – Hall XXL, Nantes; Attendance: 8,326; Referees: Gjeding, Hansen (DEN)
15 January 2017; 20:45	Langaro 8	(14–12)	Tokuda 7	Exponantes – Hall XXL, Nantes; Attendance: 8,326; Referees: Gjeding, Hansen (DEN)
15 January 2017; 20:45	1× (yellow card) 2× (suspension)	Report	3× (yellow card) 2× (suspension)	Exponantes – Hall XXL, Nantes; Attendance: 8,326; Referees: Gjeding, Hansen (DEN)

16 January 2017; 20:45	Poland	20–24	Russia	Exponantes – Hall XXL, Nantes; Attendance: 4,961; Referees: Horáček, Novotný (CZE)
16 January 2017; 20:45	T. Gębala 4	(9–13)	Kovalyov 7	Exponantes – Hall XXL, Nantes; Attendance: 4,961; Referees: Horáček, Novotný (CZE)
16 January 2017; 20:45	2× (yellow card) 5× (suspension) 1× (red card)	Report	1× (yellow card) 3× (suspension)	Exponantes – Hall XXL, Nantes; Attendance: 4,961; Referees: Horáček, Novotný (CZE)

17 January 2017; 14:00	Norway	39–26	Brazil	Exponantes – Hall XXL, Nantes; Attendance: 5,943; Referees: Horáček, Novotný (CZE)
17 January 2017; 14:00	Sagosen 7	(18–13)	Chiuffa, Pozzer 6	Exponantes – Hall XXL, Nantes; Attendance: 5,943; Referees: Horáček, Novotný (CZE)
17 January 2017; 14:00	2× (yellow card) 3× (suspension)	Report	1× (yellow card) 6× (suspension)	Exponantes – Hall XXL, Nantes; Attendance: 5,943; Referees: Horáček, Novotný (CZE)

17 January 2017; 17:45	Poland	26–25	Japan	Exponantes – Hall XXL, Nantes; Attendance: 8,655; Referees: Brunner, Salah (SUI)
17 January 2017; 17:45	Daszek 5	(9–11)	Shida 9	Exponantes – Hall XXL, Nantes; Attendance: 8,655; Referees: Brunner, Salah (SUI)
17 January 2017; 17:45	3× (yellow card) 4× (suspension)	Report	2× (yellow card) 1× (suspension)	Exponantes – Hall XXL, Nantes; Attendance: 8,655; Referees: Brunner, Salah (SUI)

17 January 2017; 20:45	Russia	24–35	France	Exponantes – Hall XXL, Nantes; Attendance: 10,500; Referees: Gjeding, Hansen (DEN)
17 January 2017; 20:45	Shishkaryov 6	(11–16)	Dipanda 8	Exponantes – Hall XXL, Nantes; Attendance: 10,500; Referees: Gjeding, Hansen (DEN)
17 January 2017; 20:45	1× (yellow card) 3× (suspension)	Report	2× (yellow card) 2× (suspension)	Exponantes – Hall XXL, Nantes; Attendance: 10,500; Referees: Gjeding, Hansen (DEN)

19 January 2017; 14:00	Russia	28–24	Brazil	Exponantes – Hall XXL, Nantes; Attendance: 5,197; Referees: Gjeding, Hansen (DEN)
19 January 2017; 14:00	Dereven, Shelmenko 5	(14–15)	three players 5	Exponantes – Hall XXL, Nantes; Attendance: 5,197; Referees: Gjeding, Hansen (DEN)
19 January 2017; 14:00	2× (yellow card) 5× (suspension) 1× (red card)	Report	1× (yellow card) 4× (suspension)	Exponantes – Hall XXL, Nantes; Attendance: 5,197; Referees: Gjeding, Hansen (DEN)

19 January 2017; 17:45	France	26–25	Poland	Exponantes – Hall XXL, Nantes; Attendance: 10,500; Referees: Brunner, Salah (SUI)
19 January 2017; 17:45	Nyokas 7	(13–13)	T. Gębala, Krajewski 5	Exponantes – Hall XXL, Nantes; Attendance: 10,500; Referees: Brunner, Salah (SUI)
19 January 2017; 17:45	2× (yellow card) 3× (suspension)	Report	2× (yellow card) 3× (suspension)	Exponantes – Hall XXL, Nantes; Attendance: 10,500; Referees: Brunner, Salah (SUI)

19 January 2017; 20:45	Japan	23–38	Norway	Exponantes – Hall XXL, Nantes; Attendance: 3,621; Referees: Horáček, Novotný (CZE)
19 January 2017; 20:45	Motoki 4	(14–19)	Myrhol 7	Exponantes – Hall XXL, Nantes; Attendance: 3,621; Referees: Horáček, Novotný (CZE)
19 January 2017; 20:45	3× (suspension)	Report	1× (suspension)	Exponantes – Hall XXL, Nantes; Attendance: 3,621; Referees: Horáček, Novotný (CZE)

=== Group B ===
Pos	Team	Pld	W	D	L	GF	GA	GD	Pts	Qualification
1	Spain	5	5	0	0	160	115	+45	10	Round of 16
2	Slovenia	5	3	1	1	151	136	+15	7	Round of 16
3	Macedonia	5	2	1	2	139	137	+2	5	Round of 16
4	Iceland	5	1	2	2	128	121	+7	4 (Note: Iceland 22–22 Tunisia)	Round of 16
5	Tunisia	5	1	2	2	144	144	0	4	
6	Angola	5	0	0	5	122	191	−69	0	

Source: IHF
Rules for classification: 1) points; 2) head-to-head points; 3) head-to-head goal difference; 4) head-to-head number of goals scored; 5) goal difference.
Notes:

12 January 2017; 14:00	Slovenia	42–25	Angola	Arenes de Metz, Metz; Attendance: 2,179; Referees: Grillo, Lenci (ARG)
12 January 2017; 14:00	Mačkovšek, Marguč 8	(22–13)	Lopes 7	Arenes de Metz, Metz; Attendance: 2,179; Referees: Grillo, Lenci (ARG)
12 January 2017; 14:00	3× (yellow card) 4× (suspension)	Report	1× (yellow card) 3× (suspension)	Arenes de Metz, Metz; Attendance: 2,179; Referees: Grillo, Lenci (ARG)

12 January 2017; 17:45	Macedonia	34–30	Tunisia	Arenes de Metz, Metz; Attendance: 2,561; Referees: Koo, Lee (KOR)
12 January 2017; 17:45	K. Lazarov 12	(13–14)	Boughanmi 9	Arenes de Metz, Metz; Attendance: 2,561; Referees: Koo, Lee (KOR)
12 January 2017; 17:45	4× (yellow card) 4× (suspension)	Report	3× (yellow card) 6× (suspension)	Arenes de Metz, Metz; Attendance: 2,561; Referees: Koo, Lee (KOR)

12 January 2017; 20:45	Spain	27–21	Iceland	Arenes de Metz, Metz; Attendance: 5,054; Referees: Gatelis, Mažeika (LTU)
12 January 2017; 20:45	Balaguer, Cañellas 4	(10–12)	Sigurðsson 5	Arenes de Metz, Metz; Attendance: 5,054; Referees: Gatelis, Mažeika (LTU)
12 January 2017; 20:45	3× (yellow card) 3× (suspension)	Report	4× (yellow card) 5× (suspension)	Arenes de Metz, Metz; Attendance: 5,054; Referees: Gatelis, Mažeika (LTU)

14 January 2017; 14:45	Iceland	25–26	Slovenia	Arenes de Metz, Metz; Attendance: 5,054; Referees: Koo, Lee (KOR)
14 January 2017; 14:45	Elísson 7	(8–11)	Bezjak 6	Arenes de Metz, Metz; Attendance: 5,054; Referees: Koo, Lee (KOR)
14 January 2017; 14:45	3× (yellow card) 5× (suspension)	Report	4× (yellow card) 4× (suspension)	Arenes de Metz, Metz; Attendance: 5,054; Referees: Koo, Lee (KOR)

14 January 2017; 17:45	Tunisia	21–26	Spain	Arenes de Metz, Metz; Attendance: 5,056; Referees: Geipel, Helbig (GER)
14 January 2017; 17:45	Toumi 5	(10–12)	Balaguer, Tomás 5	Arenes de Metz, Metz; Attendance: 5,056; Referees: Geipel, Helbig (GER)
14 January 2017; 17:45	3× (yellow card) 3× (suspension)	Report	2× (yellow card) 1× (suspension)	Arenes de Metz, Metz; Attendance: 5,056; Referees: Geipel, Helbig (GER)

14 January 2017; 20:45	Angola	22–31	Macedonia	Arenes de Metz, Metz; Attendance: 3,845; Referees: Gatelis, Mažeika (LTU)
14 January 2017; 20:45	Lopes 5	(9–14)	K. Lazarov 10	Arenes de Metz, Metz; Attendance: 3,845; Referees: Gatelis, Mažeika (LTU)
14 January 2017; 20:45	2× (yellow card) 3× (suspension)	Report	3× (yellow card) 5× (suspension)	Arenes de Metz, Metz; Attendance: 3,845; Referees: Gatelis, Mažeika (LTU)

15 January 2017; 14:45	Iceland	22–22	Tunisia	Arenes de Metz, Metz; Attendance: 5,054; Referees: Grillo, Lenci (ARG)
15 January 2017; 14:45	Sigurðsson 5	(11–13)	Bannour 12	Arenes de Metz, Metz; Attendance: 5,054; Referees: Grillo, Lenci (ARG)
15 January 2017; 14:45	2× (yellow card) 7× (suspension) 1× (red card)	Report	3× (yellow card) 3× (suspension)	Arenes de Metz, Metz; Attendance: 5,054; Referees: Grillo, Lenci (ARG)

16 January 2017; 17:45	Slovenia	29–22	Macedonia	Arenes de Metz, Metz; Attendance: 2,605; Referees: Geipel, Helbig (GER)
16 January 2017; 17:45	Bezjak, Marguč 4	(16–10)	K. Lazarov 9	Arenes de Metz, Metz; Attendance: 2,605; Referees: Geipel, Helbig (GER)
16 January 2017; 17:45	2× (yellow card) 5× (suspension)	Report	2× (yellow card) 2× (suspension)	Arenes de Metz, Metz; Attendance: 2,605; Referees: Geipel, Helbig (GER)

16 January 2017; 20:45	Spain	42–22	Angola	Arenes de Metz, Metz; Attendance: 2,126; Referees: Grillo, Lenci (ARG)
16 January 2017; 20:45	Fernández 9	(21–10)	Lopes 6	Arenes de Metz, Metz; Attendance: 2,126; Referees: Grillo, Lenci (ARG)
16 January 2017; 20:45	2× (yellow card) 1× (suspension)	Report	2× (yellow card) 1× (suspension) 1× (red card)	Arenes de Metz, Metz; Attendance: 2,126; Referees: Grillo, Lenci (ARG)

17 January 2017; 17:45	Slovenia	28–28	Tunisia	Arenes de Metz, Metz; Attendance: 3,039; Referees: Gatelis, Mažeika (LTU)
17 January 2017; 17:45	Kavtičnik 7	(15–13)	Sanaï 8	Arenes de Metz, Metz; Attendance: 3,039; Referees: Gatelis, Mažeika (LTU)
17 January 2017; 17:45	3× (yellow card) 5× (suspension)	Report	3× (yellow card) 3× (suspension) 1× (red card)	Arenes de Metz, Metz; Attendance: 3,039; Referees: Gatelis, Mažeika (LTU)

17 January 2017; 20:45	Angola	19–33	Iceland	Arenes de Metz, Metz; Attendance: 1,725; Referees: Geipel, Helbig (GER)
17 January 2017; 20:45	Lopes 8	(8–16)	Sigurðsson 8	Arenes de Metz, Metz; Attendance: 1,725; Referees: Geipel, Helbig (GER)
17 January 2017; 20:45	3× (yellow card) 5× (suspension)	Report	2× (yellow card) 1× (suspension)	Arenes de Metz, Metz; Attendance: 1,725; Referees: Geipel, Helbig (GER)

18 January 2017; 20:45	Macedonia	25–29	Spain	Arenes de Metz, Metz; Attendance: 3,951; Referees: Gatelis, Mažeika (LTU)
18 January 2017; 20:45	K. Lazarov 6	(14–14)	Rivera Folch 11	Arenes de Metz, Metz; Attendance: 3,951; Referees: Gatelis, Mažeika (LTU)
18 January 2017; 20:45	4× (yellow card) 2× (suspension)	Report	2× (yellow card) 2× (suspension)	Arenes de Metz, Metz; Attendance: 3,951; Referees: Gatelis, Mažeika (LTU)

19 January 2017; 14:00	Tunisia	43–34	Angola	Arenes de Metz, Metz; Attendance: 1,935; Referees: Koo, Lee (KOR)
19 January 2017; 14:00	Bannour 10	(23–16)	Teca 10	Arenes de Metz, Metz; Attendance: 1,935; Referees: Koo, Lee (KOR)
19 January 2017; 14:00	2× (yellow card) 2× (suspension)	Report	3× (yellow card) 3× (suspension) 1× (red card)	Arenes de Metz, Metz; Attendance: 1,935; Referees: Koo, Lee (KOR)

19 January 2017; 17:45	Macedonia	27–27	Iceland	Arenes de Metz, Metz; Attendance: 3,225; Referees: Grillo, Lenci (ARG)
19 January 2017; 17:45	K. Lazarov 7	(13–15)	Kárason 7	Arenes de Metz, Metz; Attendance: 3,225; Referees: Grillo, Lenci (ARG)
19 January 2017; 17:45	3× (yellow card) 4× (suspension)	Report	3× (yellow card) 4× (suspension)	Arenes de Metz, Metz; Attendance: 3,225; Referees: Grillo, Lenci (ARG)

19 January 2017; 20:45	Spain	36–26	Slovenia	Arenes de Metz, Metz; Attendance: 5,054; Referees: Geipel, Helbig (GER)
19 January 2017; 20:45	Balaguer 7	(18–10)	Marguč 6	Arenes de Metz, Metz; Attendance: 5,054; Referees: Geipel, Helbig (GER)
19 January 2017; 20:45	1× (yellow card) 4× (suspension)	Report	3× (yellow card) 4× (suspension)	Arenes de Metz, Metz; Attendance: 5,054; Referees: Geipel, Helbig (GER)

=== Group C ===
Pos	Team	Pld	W	D	L	GF	GA	GD	Pts	Qualification
1	Germany	5	5	0	0	159	107	+52	10	Round of 16
2	Croatia	5	4	0	1	148	126	+22	8	Round of 16
3	Belarus	5	2	0	3	134	145	−11	4 (Note: Belarus 27–25 Hungary)	Round of 16
4	Hungary	5	2	0	3	147	138	+9	4	Round of 16
5	Saudi Arabia	5	1	0	4	123	157	−34	2 (Note: Saudi Arabia 26–25 Chile)	
6	Chile	5	1	0	4	122	160	−38	2	

Source: IHF
Rules for classification: 1) points; 2) head-to-head points; 3) head-to-head goal difference; 4) head-to-head number of goals scored; 5) goal difference.
Notes:

13 January 2017; 14:00	Belarus	28–32	Chile	Kindarena, Rouen; Attendance: 2,000; Referees: Bonaventura, Bonaventura (FRA)
13 January 2017; 14:00	Karalek 10	(14–14)	R. Salinas 8	Kindarena, Rouen; Attendance: 2,000; Referees: Bonaventura, Bonaventura (FRA)
13 January 2017; 14:00	3× (yellow card) 7× (suspension)	Report	3× (yellow card) 4× (suspension)	Kindarena, Rouen; Attendance: 2,000; Referees: Bonaventura, Bonaventura (FRA)

13 January 2017; 17:45	Germany	27–23	Hungary	Kindarena, Rouen; Attendance: 5,000; Referees: Nachevski, Nikolov (MKD)
13 January 2017; 17:45	Gensheimer 13	(16–11)	six players 3	Kindarena, Rouen; Attendance: 5,000; Referees: Nachevski, Nikolov (MKD)
13 January 2017; 17:45	2× (yellow card) 3× (suspension)	Report	3× (yellow card) 2× (suspension) 1× (red card)	Kindarena, Rouen; Attendance: 5,000; Referees: Nachevski, Nikolov (MKD)

13 January 2017; 20:45	Croatia	28–23	Saudi Arabia	Kindarena, Rouen; Attendance: 4,500; Referees: Boualloucha, Khenissi (TUN)
13 January 2017; 20:45	Cindrić 6	(12–11)	Al-Salem 5	Kindarena, Rouen; Attendance: 4,500; Referees: Boualloucha, Khenissi (TUN)
13 January 2017; 20:45	3× (yellow card) 3× (suspension)	Report	3× (yellow card) 4× (suspension)	Kindarena, Rouen; Attendance: 4,500; Referees: Boualloucha, Khenissi (TUN)

14 January 2017; 20:45	Hungary	28–31	Croatia	Kindarena, Rouen; Attendance: 5,588; Referees: Līcis, Sondors (LAT)
14 January 2017; 20:45	Balogh, Harsányi 6	(11–11)	Štrlek 6	Kindarena, Rouen; Attendance: 5,588; Referees: Līcis, Sondors (LAT)
14 January 2017; 20:45	3× (yellow card) 3× (suspension)	Report	3× (yellow card) 4× (suspension)	Kindarena, Rouen; Attendance: 5,588; Referees: Līcis, Sondors (LAT)

15 January 2017; 14:45	Chile	14–35	Germany	Kindarena, Rouen; Attendance: 5,000; Referees: Līcis, Sondors (LAT)
15 January 2017; 14:45	four players 2	(6–17)	Kohlbacher 8	Kindarena, Rouen; Attendance: 5,000; Referees: Līcis, Sondors (LAT)
15 January 2017; 14:45	3× (yellow card) 3× (suspension)	Report	3× (yellow card) 3× (suspension)	Kindarena, Rouen; Attendance: 5,000; Referees: Līcis, Sondors (LAT)

15 January 2017; 20:45	Saudi Arabia	26–29	Belarus	Kindarena, Rouen; Attendance: 3,000; Referees: Nachevski, Nikolov (MKD)
15 January 2017; 20:45	Al-Salem 7	(13–14)	Pukhouski 9	Kindarena, Rouen; Attendance: 3,000; Referees: Nachevski, Nikolov (MKD)
15 January 2017; 20:45	3× (yellow card) 5× (suspension)	Report	3× (yellow card) 5× (suspension)	Kindarena, Rouen; Attendance: 3,000; Referees: Nachevski, Nikolov (MKD)

16 January 2017; 17:45	Hungary	34–29	Chile	Kindarena, Rouen; Attendance: 2,000; Referees: Boualloucha, Khenissi (TUN)
16 January 2017; 17:45	Jamali 7	(17–14)	Er. Feuchtmann 9	Kindarena, Rouen; Attendance: 2,000; Referees: Boualloucha, Khenissi (TUN)
16 January 2017; 17:45	4× (yellow card) 5× (suspension) 1× (red card)	Report	3× (yellow card) 1× (suspension)	Kindarena, Rouen; Attendance: 2,000; Referees: Boualloucha, Khenissi (TUN)

16 January 2017; 20:45	Croatia	31–25	Belarus	Kindarena, Rouen; Attendance: 3,202; Referees: Bonaventura, Bonaventura (FRA)
16 January 2017; 20:45	Cindrić 8	(18–15)	Karalek 7	Kindarena, Rouen; Attendance: 3,202; Referees: Bonaventura, Bonaventura (FRA)
16 January 2017; 20:45	4× (yellow card) 4× (suspension) 1× (red card)	Report	4× (yellow card) 5× (suspension)	Kindarena, Rouen; Attendance: 3,202; Referees: Bonaventura, Bonaventura (FRA)

17 January 2017; 17:45	Germany	38–24	Saudi Arabia	Kindarena, Rouen; Attendance: 2,980; Referees: Nachevski, Nikolov (MKD)
17 January 2017; 17:45	Fäth 6	(21–13)	Al-Zaer 8	Kindarena, Rouen; Attendance: 2,980; Referees: Nachevski, Nikolov (MKD)
17 January 2017; 17:45	3× (yellow card) 3× (suspension)	Report	3× (yellow card) 2× (suspension)	Kindarena, Rouen; Attendance: 2,980; Referees: Nachevski, Nikolov (MKD)

18 January 2017; 14:00	Saudi Arabia	24–37	Hungary	Kindarena, Rouen; Attendance: 4,959; Referees: Līcis, Sondors (LAT)
18 January 2017; 14:00	Al-Mohsin 7	(10–17)	Császár 9	Kindarena, Rouen; Attendance: 4,959; Referees: Līcis, Sondors (LAT)
18 January 2017; 14:00	2× (yellow card) 4× (suspension)	Report	2× (yellow card) 4× (suspension)	Kindarena, Rouen; Attendance: 4,959; Referees: Līcis, Sondors (LAT)

18 January 2017; 17:45	Belarus	25–31	Germany	Kindarena, Rouen; Attendance: 4,524; Referees: Boualloucha, Khenissi (TUN)
18 January 2017; 17:45	three players 4	(16–16)	Gensheimer 8	Kindarena, Rouen; Attendance: 4,524; Referees: Boualloucha, Khenissi (TUN)
18 January 2017; 17:45	3× (yellow card) 3× (suspension)	Report	3× (yellow card) 3× (suspension)	Kindarena, Rouen; Attendance: 4,524; Referees: Boualloucha, Khenissi (TUN)

18 January 2017; 20:45	Croatia	37–22	Chile	Kindarena, Rouen; Attendance: 2,785; Referees: Bonaventura, Bonaventura (FRA)
18 January 2017; 20:45	Mihić 8	(17–9)	Er. Feuchtmann, E. Salinas 4	Kindarena, Rouen; Attendance: 2,785; Referees: Bonaventura, Bonaventura (FRA)
18 January 2017; 20:45	3× (yellow card) 3× (suspension)	Report	2× (yellow card) 5× (suspension)	Kindarena, Rouen; Attendance: 2,785; Referees: Bonaventura, Bonaventura (FRA)

20 January 2017; 14:00	Chile	25–26	Saudi Arabia	Kindarena, Rouen; Attendance: 2,366; Referees: Pavićević, Ražnatović (MNE)
20 January 2017; 14:00	R. Salinas 7	(13–13)	A. Al-Abbas 9	Kindarena, Rouen; Attendance: 2,366; Referees: Pavićević, Ražnatović (MNE)
20 January 2017; 14:00	3× (yellow card) 3× (suspension)	Report	3× (yellow card) 8× (suspension)	Kindarena, Rouen; Attendance: 2,366; Referees: Pavićević, Ražnatović (MNE)

20 January 2017; 17:45	Germany	28–21	Croatia	Kindarena, Rouen; Attendance: 5,000; Referees: Līcis, Sondors (LAT)
20 January 2017; 17:45	Wiencek 6	(13–9)	Stepančić, Štrlek 5	Kindarena, Rouen; Attendance: 5,000; Referees: Līcis, Sondors (LAT)
20 January 2017; 17:45	3× (yellow card) 3× (suspension)	Report	2× (yellow card) 3× (suspension)	Kindarena, Rouen; Attendance: 5,000; Referees: Līcis, Sondors (LAT)

20 January 2017; 20:45	Belarus	27–25	Hungary	Kindarena, Rouen; Attendance: 3,761; Referees: Nachevski, Nikolov (MKD)
20 January 2017; 20:45	Brouka, Pukhouski 6	(15–13)	Császár, Juhász 7	Kindarena, Rouen; Attendance: 3,761; Referees: Nachevski, Nikolov (MKD)
20 January 2017; 20:45	3× (yellow card) 2× (suspension)	Report	4× (yellow card) 7× (suspension)	Kindarena, Rouen; Attendance: 3,761; Referees: Nachevski, Nikolov (MKD)

=== Group D ===
Pos	Team	Pld	W	D	L	GF	GA	GD	Pts	Qualification
1	Denmark	5	5	0	0	157	130	+27	10	Round of 16
2	Sweden	5	4	0	1	162	111	+51	8	Round of 16
3	Egypt	5	3	0	2	138	143	−5	6	Round of 16
4	Qatar	5	2	0	3	127	129	−2	4	Round of 16
5	Argentina	5	1	0	4	108	137	−29	2	
6	Bahrain	5	0	0	5	110	152	−42	0	

Source: IHF
Rules for classification: 1) points; 2) head-to-head points; 3) head-to-head goal difference; 4) head-to-head number of goals scored; 5) goal difference.

13 January 2017; 14:00	Qatar	20–22	Egypt	AccorHotels Arena, Paris; Attendance: 4,315; Referees: López, Ramírez (ESP)
13 January 2017; 14:00	Capote 5	(8–11)	El-Ahmar 8	AccorHotels Arena, Paris; Attendance: 4,315; Referees: López, Ramírez (ESP)
13 January 2017; 14:00	2× (yellow card) 4× (suspension)	Report	1× (yellow card) 7× (suspension)	AccorHotels Arena, Paris; Attendance: 4,315; Referees: López, Ramírez (ESP)

13 January 2017; 17:45	Sweden	33–16	Bahrain	AccorHotels Arena, Paris; Attendance: 6,579; Referees: Reveret, Pichon (FRA)
13 January 2017; 17:45	Tollbring 10	(17–5)	Habib 4	AccorHotels Arena, Paris; Attendance: 6,579; Referees: Reveret, Pichon (FRA)
13 January 2017; 17:45	2× (yellow card) 5× (suspension)	Report	2× (yellow card) 5× (suspension)	AccorHotels Arena, Paris; Attendance: 6,579; Referees: Reveret, Pichon (FRA)

13 January 2017; 20:45	Denmark	33–22	Argentina	AccorHotels Arena, Paris; Attendance: 7,582; Referees: Pavićević, Ražnatović (MNE)
13 January 2017; 20:45	Hansen 6	(17–11)	F. Fernández 6	AccorHotels Arena, Paris; Attendance: 7,582; Referees: Pavićević, Ražnatović (MNE)
13 January 2017; 20:45	2× (yellow card) 3× (suspension)	Report	2× (yellow card) 4× (suspension)	AccorHotels Arena, Paris; Attendance: 7,582; Referees: Pavićević, Ražnatović (MNE)

14 January 2017; 20:45	Egypt	28–35	Denmark	AccorHotels Arena, Paris; Attendance: 7,413; Referees: Lah, Sok (SLO)
14 January 2017; 20:45	El-Deraa 6	(15–21)	Svan 6	AccorHotels Arena, Paris; Attendance: 7,413; Referees: Lah, Sok (SLO)
14 January 2017; 20:45	2× (yellow card) 1× (suspension) 1× (red card)	Report	2× (yellow card) 4× (suspension)	AccorHotels Arena, Paris; Attendance: 7,413; Referees: Lah, Sok (SLO)

15 January 2017; 14:45	Argentina	17–35	Sweden	AccorHotels Arena, Paris; Attendance: 12,578; Referees: Lah, Sok (SLO)
15 January 2017; 14:45	S. Simonet 5	(11–16)	Zachrisson 8	AccorHotels Arena, Paris; Attendance: 12,578; Referees: Lah, Sok (SLO)
15 January 2017; 14:45	2× (yellow card) 4× (suspension)	Report	3× (yellow card) 5× (suspension) 2× (red card)	AccorHotels Arena, Paris; Attendance: 12,578; Referees: Lah, Sok (SLO)

15 January 2017; 17:45	Bahrain	22–32	Qatar	AccorHotels Arena, Paris; Attendance: 4,475; Referees: Pavićević, Ražnatović (MNE)
15 January 2017; 17:45	Abdulqader 5	(9–19)	Madadi 8	AccorHotels Arena, Paris; Attendance: 4,475; Referees: Pavićević, Ražnatović (MNE)
15 January 2017; 17:45	4× (yellow card) 5× (suspension)	Report	2× (yellow card) 7× (suspension)	AccorHotels Arena, Paris; Attendance: 4,475; Referees: Pavićević, Ražnatović (MNE)

16 January 2017; 17:45	Egypt	31–29	Bahrain	AccorHotels Arena, Paris; Attendance: 4,429; Referees: Reveret, Pichon (FRA)
16 January 2017; 17:45	El-Deraa 6	(17–15)	Saad 6	AccorHotels Arena, Paris; Attendance: 4,429; Referees: Reveret, Pichon (FRA)
16 January 2017; 17:45	3× (suspension)	Report	2× (yellow card) 5× (suspension) 1× (red card)	AccorHotels Arena, Paris; Attendance: 4,429; Referees: Reveret, Pichon (FRA)

16 January 2017; 20:45	Denmark	27–25	Sweden	AccorHotels Arena, Paris; Attendance: 13,850; Referees: López, Ramírez (ESP)
16 January 2017; 20:45	Hansen 8	(14–10)	Ekberg 7	AccorHotels Arena, Paris; Attendance: 13,850; Referees: López, Ramírez (ESP)
16 January 2017; 20:45	3× (yellow card) 4× (suspension)	Report	3× (yellow card) 3× (suspension)	AccorHotels Arena, Paris; Attendance: 13,850; Referees: López, Ramírez (ESP)

17 January 2017; 17:45	Qatar	21–17	Argentina	AccorHotels Arena, Paris; Attendance: 3,641; Referees: Lah, Sok (SLO)
17 January 2017; 17:45	Mallash 5	(9–2)	F. Fernández 7	AccorHotels Arena, Paris; Attendance: 3,641; Referees: Lah, Sok (SLO)
17 January 2017; 17:45	3× (yellow card) 3× (suspension)	Report	1× (yellow card) 2× (suspension)	AccorHotels Arena, Paris; Attendance: 3,641; Referees: Lah, Sok (SLO)

18 January 2017; 14:00	Argentina	26–31	Egypt	AccorHotels Arena, Paris; Attendance: 7,233; Referees: López, Ramírez (ESP)
18 January 2017; 14:00	Vieyra 12	(10–13)	three players 5	AccorHotels Arena, Paris; Attendance: 7,233; Referees: López, Ramírez (ESP)
18 January 2017; 14:00	2× (yellow card) 4× (suspension)	Report	3× (yellow card) 5× (suspension)	AccorHotels Arena, Paris; Attendance: 7,233; Referees: López, Ramírez (ESP)

18 January 2017; 17:45	Denmark	30–26	Bahrain	AccorHotels Arena, Paris; Attendance: 7,900; Referees: Lah, Sok (SLO)
18 January 2017; 17:45	H. Toft Hansen 6	(17–13)	Habib, Mahfoodh 6	AccorHotels Arena, Paris; Attendance: 7,900; Referees: Lah, Sok (SLO)
18 January 2017; 17:45	2× (yellow card) 4× (suspension) 1× (red card)	Report	2× (yellow card) 6× (suspension)	AccorHotels Arena, Paris; Attendance: 7,900; Referees: Lah, Sok (SLO)

18 January 2017; 20:45	Sweden	36–25	Qatar	AccorHotels Arena, Paris; Attendance: 6,034; Referees: Reveret, Pichon (FRA)
18 January 2017; 20:45	Ekberg 9	(19–12)	Roiné 8	AccorHotels Arena, Paris; Attendance: 6,034; Referees: Reveret, Pichon (FRA)
18 January 2017; 20:45	1× (yellow card) 6× (suspension)	Report	1× (yellow card) 1× (suspension)	AccorHotels Arena, Paris; Attendance: 6,034; Referees: Reveret, Pichon (FRA)

20 January 2017; 14:00	Bahrain	17–26	Argentina	AccorHotels Arena, Paris; Attendance: 6,314; Referees: Reveret, Pichon (FRA)
20 January 2017; 14:00	Abdulqader 5	(8–13)	F. Fernández 8	AccorHotels Arena, Paris; Attendance: 6,314; Referees: Reveret, Pichon (FRA)
20 January 2017; 14:00	2× (yellow card) 6× (suspension)	Report	1× (yellow card) 7× (suspension)	AccorHotels Arena, Paris; Attendance: 6,314; Referees: Reveret, Pichon (FRA)

20 January 2017; 17:45	Sweden	33–26	Egypt	AccorHotels Arena, Paris; Attendance: 7,660; Referees: Lah, Sok (SLO)
20 January 2017; 17:45	Ekberg 8	(15–9)	Issa 7	AccorHotels Arena, Paris; Attendance: 7,660; Referees: Lah, Sok (SLO)
20 January 2017; 17:45	1× (yellow card) 7× (suspension)	Report	3× (yellow card) 4× (suspension)	AccorHotels Arena, Paris; Attendance: 7,660; Referees: Lah, Sok (SLO)

20 January 2017; 20:45	Qatar	29–32	Denmark	AccorHotels Arena, Paris; Attendance: 8,444; Referees: López, Ramírez (ESP)
20 January 2017; 20:45	Capote, Benali 5	(16–14)	Nøddesbo 8	AccorHotels Arena, Paris; Attendance: 8,444; Referees: López, Ramírez (ESP)
20 January 2017; 20:45	2× (yellow card) 2× (suspension)	Report	4× (yellow card) 4× (suspension)	AccorHotels Arena, Paris; Attendance: 8,444; Referees: López, Ramírez (ESP)

== Presidents Cup ==
=== 21st–24th place bracket ===
21st–24th place semifinals
21 January
Japan	37
Angola	26
22 January
Chile	35
Bahrain	30

21st place
23 January
Japan	29
Chile	35
23rd place
23 January
Angola	26
Bahrain	32

==== 21st–24th place semifinals ====
21 January 2017; 14:00	Japan	37–26	Angola	Brest Arena, Brest; Attendance: 3,017; Referees: Kolahdouzan, Mousaviannazhad (IRN)
21 January 2017; 14:00	Tokuda 8	(18–14)	Lopes 9	Brest Arena, Brest; Attendance: 3,017; Referees: Kolahdouzan, Mousaviannazhad (IRN)
21 January 2017; 14:00	3× (yellow card) 3× (suspension)	Report	1× (yellow card) 4× (suspension)	Brest Arena, Brest; Attendance: 3,017; Referees: Kolahdouzan, Mousaviannazhad (IRN)

22 January 2017; 14:00	Chile	35–30	Bahrain	Brest Arena, Brest; Attendance: 3,600; Referees: Koo, Lee (KOR)
22 January 2017; 14:00	E. Salinas, R. Salinas 8	(18–14)	Al-Sayyad 8	Brest Arena, Brest; Attendance: 3,600; Referees: Koo, Lee (KOR)
22 January 2017; 14:00	2× (yellow card) 5× (suspension)	Report	4× (yellow card) 7× (suspension)	Brest Arena, Brest; Attendance: 3,600; Referees: Koo, Lee (KOR)

==== 23rd place game ====
23 January 2017; 13:00	Angola	26–32	Bahrain	Brest Arena, Brest; Attendance: 3,200; Referees: Pavićević, Ražnatović (MNE)
23 January 2017; 13:00	Pestana 6	(13–15)	A. Merza 8	Brest Arena, Brest; Attendance: 3,200; Referees: Pavićević, Ražnatović (MNE)
23 January 2017; 13:00	1× (yellow card) 5× (suspension)	Report	2× (yellow card) 1× (suspension)	Brest Arena, Brest; Attendance: 3,200; Referees: Pavićević, Ražnatović (MNE)

==== 21st place game ====
23 January 2017; 15:00	Japan	29–35	Chile	Brest Arena, Brest; Attendance: 3,200; Referees: Reveret, Pichon (FRA)
23 January 2017; 15:00	Agarie 9	(12–17)	Ceballos, Er. Feuchtmann 7	Brest Arena, Brest; Attendance: 3,200; Referees: Reveret, Pichon (FRA)
23 January 2017; 15:00	3× (yellow card) 1× (suspension)	Report	3× (yellow card) 2× (suspension)	Brest Arena, Brest; Attendance: 3,200; Referees: Reveret, Pichon (FRA)

=== 17–20th place bracket ===
17–20th place semifinals
21 January
Poland	28
Tunisia	26
22 January
Saudi Arabia	22
Argentina	24

17th place
23 January
Poland	24
Argentina	22
19th place
23 January
Tunisia	39
Saudi Arabia	30

==== 17–20th place semifinals ====
21 January 2017; 16:00	Poland	28–26	Tunisia	Brest Arena, Brest; Attendance: 3,600; Referees: Reveret, Pichon (FRA)
21 January 2017; 16:00	Krajewski 8	(15–11)	Bannour 10	Brest Arena, Brest; Attendance: 3,600; Referees: Reveret, Pichon (FRA)
21 January 2017; 16:00	2× (yellow card) 5× (suspension) 1× (red card)	Report	2× (yellow card) 4× (suspension)	Brest Arena, Brest; Attendance: 3,600; Referees: Reveret, Pichon (FRA)

22 January 2017; 16:00	Saudi Arabia	22–24	Argentina	Brest Arena, Brest; Attendance: 4,114; Referees: Pavićević, Ražnatović (MNE)
22 January 2017; 16:00	M. Al-Abbas 6	(8–10)	Pizarro 6	Brest Arena, Brest; Attendance: 4,114; Referees: Pavićević, Ražnatović (MNE)
22 January 2017; 16:00	2× (yellow card) 6× (suspension)	Report	3× (yellow card) 3× (suspension)	Brest Arena, Brest; Attendance: 4,114; Referees: Pavićević, Ražnatović (MNE)

==== 19th place game ====
23 January 2017; 18:00	Tunisia	39–30	Saudi Arabia	Brest Arena, Brest; Attendance: 1,650; Referees: Koo, Lee (KOR)
23 January 2017; 18:00	Haj Youssef 12	(20–15)	M. Al-Abbas 9	Brest Arena, Brest; Attendance: 1,650; Referees: Koo, Lee (KOR)
23 January 2017; 18:00	3× (yellow card) 3× (suspension)	Report	2× (yellow card) 2× (suspension)	Brest Arena, Brest; Attendance: 1,650; Referees: Koo, Lee (KOR)

==== 17th place game ====
23 January 2017; 20:00	Poland	24–22	Argentina	Brest Arena, Brest; Attendance: 2,320; Referees: Kolahdouzan, Mousaviannazhad (IRN)
23 January 2017; 20:00	Krajewski 6	(13–13)	F. Fernández 8	Brest Arena, Brest; Attendance: 2,320; Referees: Kolahdouzan, Mousaviannazhad (IRN)
23 January 2017; 20:00	3× (yellow card) 4× (suspension)	Report	3× (yellow card) 4× (suspension)	Brest Arena, Brest; Attendance: 2,320; Referees: Kolahdouzan, Mousaviannazhad (IRN)

== Knockout stage ==
=== Bracket ===
Round of 16
21 January
France	31
Iceland	25
22 January
Belarus	22
Sweden	41
21 January
Russia	26
Slovenia	32
22 January
Germany	20
Qatar	21
21 January
Brazil	27
Spain	28
22 January
Croatia	21
Egypt	19
21 January
Norway	34
Macedonia	24
22 January
Hungary	27
Denmark	25

Quarterfinals
24 January
France	33
Sweden	30
24 January
Slovenia	32
Qatar	30
24 January
Spain	29
Croatia	30
24 January
Norway	31
Hungary	28

Semifinals
26 January
France	31
Slovenia	25
27 January
Croatia	25
Norway (OT)	28

Final
29 January
France	33
Norway	26
Third place
28 January
Slovenia	31
Croatia	30

=== Round of 16 ===
21 January 2017; 16:00	Norway	34–24	Macedonia	La halle de glace Olympique, Albertville; Attendance: 6,540; Referees: Līcis, Sondors (LAT)
21 January 2017; 16:00	Jøndal, Tangen 6	(12–10)	K. Lazarov 6	La halle de glace Olympique, Albertville; Attendance: 6,540; Referees: Līcis, Sondors (LAT)
21 January 2017; 16:00	2× (yellow card) 2× (suspension)	Report	2× (yellow card) 4× (suspension)	La halle de glace Olympique, Albertville; Attendance: 6,540; Referees: Līcis, Sondors (LAT)

21 January 2017; 18:00	France	31–25	Iceland	Stade Pierre-Mauroy, Lille; Attendance: 28,010; Referees: Grillo, Lenci (ARG)
21 January 2017; 18:00	Guigou 6	(14–13)	Kárason 7	Stade Pierre-Mauroy, Lille; Attendance: 28,010; Referees: Grillo, Lenci (ARG)
21 January 2017; 18:00	1× (yellow card) 2× (suspension)	Report	3× (yellow card) 4× (suspension)	Stade Pierre-Mauroy, Lille; Attendance: 28,010; Referees: Grillo, Lenci (ARG)

21 January 2017; 20:45	Brazil	27–28	Spain	Park&Suites Arena, Montpellier; Attendance: 6,923; Referees: Brunner, Salah (SUI)
21 January 2017; 20:45	Silva 7	(18–16)	Cañellas, Dujshebaev 5	Park&Suites Arena, Montpellier; Attendance: 6,923; Referees: Brunner, Salah (SUI)
21 January 2017; 20:45	2× (yellow card) 5× (suspension)	Report	2× (yellow card) 4× (suspension)	Park&Suites Arena, Montpellier; Attendance: 6,923; Referees: Brunner, Salah (SUI)

21 January 2017; 20:45	Russia	26–32	Slovenia	AccorHotels Arena, Paris; Attendance: 8,324; Referees: Bonaventura, Bonaventura (FRA)
21 January 2017; 20:45	Dereven, Shishkarev 5	(15–13)	Cingesar 6	AccorHotels Arena, Paris; Attendance: 8,324; Referees: Bonaventura, Bonaventura (FRA)
21 January 2017; 20:45	3× (yellow card) 7× (suspension) 1× (red card)	Report	3× (yellow card) 2× (suspension)	AccorHotels Arena, Paris; Attendance: 8,324; Referees: Bonaventura, Bonaventura (FRA)

22 January 2017; 16:00	Hungary	27–25	Denmark	La halle de glace Olympique, Albertville; Attendance: 6,540; Referees: Boualloucha, Khenissi (TUN)
22 January 2017; 16:00	Lékai 6	(13–12)	Hansen 8	La halle de glace Olympique, Albertville; Attendance: 6,540; Referees: Boualloucha, Khenissi (TUN)
22 January 2017; 16:00	3× (yellow card) 3× (suspension)	Report	2× (yellow card) 1× (suspension)	La halle de glace Olympique, Albertville; Attendance: 6,540; Referees: Boualloucha, Khenissi (TUN)

22 January 2017; 16:00	Belarus	22–41	Sweden	Stade Pierre-Mauroy, Lille; Attendance: 16,188; Referees: Nachevski, Nikolov (MKD)
22 January 2017; 16:00	Karalek 7	(11–24)	Gottfridsson 8	Stade Pierre-Mauroy, Lille; Attendance: 16,188; Referees: Nachevski, Nikolov (MKD)
22 January 2017; 16:00	2× (yellow card) 4× (suspension)	Report	1× (yellow card) 3× (suspension)	Stade Pierre-Mauroy, Lille; Attendance: 16,188; Referees: Nachevski, Nikolov (MKD)

22 January 2017; 18:00	Germany	20–21	Qatar	AccorHotels Arena, Paris; Attendance: 10,209; Referees: Gatelis, Mažeika (LTU)
22 January 2017; 18:00	Glandorf, Groetzki 4	(10–9)	Capote 9	AccorHotels Arena, Paris; Attendance: 10,209; Referees: Gatelis, Mažeika (LTU)
22 January 2017; 18:00	4× (yellow card) 5× (suspension)	Report	3× (yellow card) 4× (suspension)	AccorHotels Arena, Paris; Attendance: 10,209; Referees: Gatelis, Mažeika (LTU)

22 January 2017; 20:45	Croatia	21–19	Egypt	Park&Suites Arena, Montpellier; Attendance: 6,266; Referees: Gjeding, Hansen (DEN)
22 January 2017; 20:45	Horvat 6	(13–7)	El-Ahmar 5	Park&Suites Arena, Montpellier; Attendance: 6,266; Referees: Gjeding, Hansen (DEN)
22 January 2017; 20:45	3× (suspension)	Report	4× (suspension)	Park&Suites Arena, Montpellier; Attendance: 6,266; Referees: Gjeding, Hansen (DEN)

=== Quarterfinals ===
24 January 2017; 17:00	Norway	31–28	Hungary	La halle de glace Olympique, Albertville; Attendance: 6,540; Referees: Geipel, Helbig (GER)
24 January 2017; 17:00	Lie Hansen 6	(17–10)	Császár 11	La halle de glace Olympique, Albertville; Attendance: 6,540; Referees: Geipel, Helbig (GER)
24 January 2017; 17:00	2× (yellow card) 7× (suspension)	Report	3× (yellow card) 3× (suspension)	La halle de glace Olympique, Albertville; Attendance: 6,540; Referees: Geipel, Helbig (GER)

24 January 2017; 19:00	France	33–30	Sweden	Stade Pierre-Mauroy, Lille; Attendance: 28,010; Referees: López, Ramírez (ESP)
24 January 2017; 19:00	Mahé 9	(15–16)	Gottfridsson 7	Stade Pierre-Mauroy, Lille; Attendance: 28,010; Referees: López, Ramírez (ESP)
24 January 2017; 19:00	3× (yellow card) 5× (suspension)	Report	3× (yellow card) 6× (suspension)	Stade Pierre-Mauroy, Lille; Attendance: 28,010; Referees: López, Ramírez (ESP)

24 January 2017; 20:45	Slovenia	32–30	Qatar	AccorHotels Arena, Paris; Attendance: 6,573; Referees: Horáček, Novotný (CZE)
24 January 2017; 20:45	Marguč 6	(18–15)	Roiné 8	AccorHotels Arena, Paris; Attendance: 6,573; Referees: Horáček, Novotný (CZE)
24 January 2017; 20:45	1× (yellow card) 3× (suspension)	Report	1× (yellow card) 4× (suspension)	AccorHotels Arena, Paris; Attendance: 6,573; Referees: Horáček, Novotný (CZE)

24 January 2017; 20:45	Spain	29–30	Croatia	Park&Suites Arena, Montpellier; Attendance: 6,749; Referees: Gjeding, Hansen (DEN)
24 January 2017; 20:45	Fernández 7	(15–17)	Mamić 9	Park&Suites Arena, Montpellier; Attendance: 6,749; Referees: Gjeding, Hansen (DEN)
24 January 2017; 20:45	4× (yellow card) 1× (suspension)	Report	2× (yellow card) 4× (suspension)	Park&Suites Arena, Montpellier; Attendance: 6,749; Referees: Gjeding, Hansen (DEN)

=== Semifinals ===
26 January 2017; 21:00	France	31–25	Slovenia	AccorHotels Arena, Paris; Attendance: 15,609; Referees: Geipel, Helbig (GER)
26 January 2017; 21:00	Remili 6	(15–12)	Dolenec 5	AccorHotels Arena, Paris; Attendance: 15,609; Referees: Geipel, Helbig (GER)
26 January 2017; 21:00	2× (yellow card) 3× (suspension)	Report	3× (yellow card) 2× (suspension)	AccorHotels Arena, Paris; Attendance: 15,609; Referees: Geipel, Helbig (GER)

27 January 2017
20:45
Croatia
25–28 (ET)
Norway
AccorHotels Arena, Paris
Attendance: 10,324
Referees: Horáček, Novotný (CZE)
Horvat 6
(10–12)
Myrhol 6
4× (yellow card) 6× (suspension) 1× (red card)
Report
3× (yellow card) 4× (suspension)

FT: 22–22 ET: 3–6

=== Third place game ===
28 January 2017; 20:45	Slovenia	31–30	Croatia	AccorHotels Arena, Paris; Attendance: 8,625; Referees: López, Ramírez (ESP)
28 January 2017; 20:45	three players 4	(13–18)	Cindrić 7	AccorHotels Arena, Paris; Attendance: 8,625; Referees: López, Ramírez (ESP)
28 January 2017; 20:45	4× (yellow card) 2× (suspension)	Report	2× (yellow card) 3× (suspension)	AccorHotels Arena, Paris; Attendance: 8,625; Referees: López, Ramírez (ESP)

=== Final ===
29 January 2017; 17:30	France	33–26	Norway	AccorHotels Arena, Paris; Attendance: 15,609; Referees: Gjeding, Hansen (DEN)
29 January 2017; 17:30	Karabatić 6	(18–17)	Tønnesen 5	AccorHotels Arena, Paris; Attendance: 15,609; Referees: Gjeding, Hansen (DEN)
29 January 2017; 17:30	2× (yellow card) 1× (suspension)	Report	4× (yellow card) 2× (suspension)	AccorHotels Arena, Paris; Attendance: 15,609; Referees: Gjeding, Hansen (DEN)

== Final ranking ==
For places 5–16 the criterion was the number of points gained against the teams ranked first to fourth in the preliminary round in their group.

Rank	Team
Gold medal	France
Silver medal	Norway
Bronze medal	Slovenia
4	Croatia
5	Spain
6	Sweden
7	Hungary
8	Qatar
9	Germany
10	Denmark
11	Belarus
12	Russia
13	Egypt
14	Iceland
15	Macedonia
16	Brazil
17	Poland
18	Argentina
19	Tunisia
20	Saudi Arabia
21	Chile
22	Japan
23	Bahrain
24	Angola

== Awards ==
=== All-Star Team ===
All-Star Team of the tournament:

- Goalkeeper: (France) Vincent Gérard
- Right wing: (Norway) Kristian Bjørnsen
- Right back: (France) Nedim Remili
- Centre back: (Croatia) Domagoj Duvnjak
- Left back: (Norway) Sander Sagosen
- Left wing: (Sweden) Jerry Tollbring
- Pivot: (Norway) Bjarte Myrhol

=== Other awards ===
- Most Valuable Player: (France) Nikola Karabatić

== Statistics ==
=== Top goalscorers ===
Rank	Name	Team	Goals	Shots	%
1	Kiril Lazarov	Macedonia	50	81	62
2	Sérgio Lopes	Angola	47	88	53
3	Amine Bannour	Tunisia	45	84	54
3	Kristian Bjørnsen	Norway	45	59	76
5	Niclas Ekberg	Sweden	43	60	72
6	Bjarte Myrhol	Norway	42	53	79
7	Sander Sagosen	Norway	41	79	52
8	Luka Cindrić	Croatia	39	65	60
8	Federico Fernandez	Argentina	39	58	67
10	Gábor Császár	Hungary	38	55	69
10	Gašper Marguč	Slovenia	38	48	79
10	Jerry Tollbring	Sweden	38	46	83

Source: IHF

=== Top goalkeepers ===
Rank	Name	Team	%	Saves	Shots
1	Espen Christensen	Norway	44	32	73
2	Andreas Wolff	Germany	43	60	141
3	Vincent Gérard	France	40	62	155
3	Niklas Landin Jacobsen	Denmark	40	66	167
3	Andreas Palicka	Sweden	40	51	127
6	Mikael Appelgren	Sweden	39	55	141
7	Rodrigo Corrales	Spain	36	43	121
7	Maik dos Santos	Brazil	36	46	129
7	Silvio Heinevetter	Germany	36	25	69
10	Makrem Missaoui	Tunisia	35	73	210

Source: IHF
