= 2017 World Men's Handball Championship – European qualification =

The European qualification for the 2017 World Men's Handball Championship in France was disputed in two rounds among the teams that did not qualify for the 2016 European Men's Handball Championship and the 12 worst-ranked teams from the European Championship (excluding France). The qualification matches took place between November 2015 and June 2016.

In the first round of qualification, 22 teams not participating at the European Championship were split into six groups. The group winners advanced to the second round, joining the 12 European Championship finalists. The 18 teams were then paired into two-legged play-off ties to determine the nine remaining World Championship qualifiers from Europe.

All times are local.

== First round ==
The draw was held on 17 June 2015.

=== Group 1 ===
| Pos | Team | Pld | W | D | L | GF | GA | GD | Pts | Qualification |
|---|---|---|---|---|---|---|---|---|---|---|
| 1 | Bosnia and Herzegovina | 6 | 5 | 1 | 0 | 187 | 152 | +35 | 11 | Playoffs |
| 2 | Slovakia | 6 | 3 | 1 | 2 | 162 | 142 | +20 | 7 | |
| 3 | Lithuania | 6 | 2 | 2 | 2 | 166 | 156 | +10 | 6 | |
| 4 | Kosovo | 6 | 0 | 0 | 6 | 145 | 210 | −65 | 0 | |

Source: Eurohandball
Rules for classification: 1) points; 2) head-to-head points; 3) head-to-head goal difference; 4) head-to-head number of goals scored; 5) goal difference.

| 4 November 2015; 19:00 | Kosovo | 26–30 | Lithuania | Shani Nushi Sports Hall, Gjakovë; Attendance: 2,200; Referees: Hájek, Macho (CZE) |
| 4 November 2015; 19:00 | Hoxha 6 | (8–15) | Drabavičius, Petreikis 6 | Shani Nushi Sports Hall, Gjakovë; Attendance: 2,200; Referees: Hájek, Macho (CZE) |
| 4 November 2015; 19:00 | 3× (yellow card) 3× (suspension) | Report | 2× (yellow card) 6× (suspension) | Shani Nushi Sports Hall, Gjakovë; Attendance: 2,200; Referees: Hájek, Macho (CZE) |

| 4 November 2015; 20:15 | Bosnia and Herzegovina | 29–25 | Slovakia | KSPC Mejdan, Tuzla; Attendance: 5,000; Referees: Olesen, Pedersen (DEN) |
| 4 November 2015; 20:15 | Prce 9 | (14–14) | Antl 8 | KSPC Mejdan, Tuzla; Attendance: 5,000; Referees: Olesen, Pedersen (DEN) |
| 4 November 2015; 20:15 | 3× (yellow card) 7× (suspension) 1× (red card) | Report | 3× (yellow card) 6× (suspension) | KSPC Mejdan, Tuzla; Attendance: 5,000; Referees: Olesen, Pedersen (DEN) |

| 7 November 2015; 18:00 | Slovakia | 38–20 | Kosovo | Športová hala Na Zábraní, Hlohovec; Attendance: 1,400; Referees: Lillepea, Kull (EST) |
| 7 November 2015; 18:00 | Urban 10 | (19–11) | Jupa 6 | Športová hala Na Zábraní, Hlohovec; Attendance: 1,400; Referees: Lillepea, Kull (EST) |
| 7 November 2015; 18:00 | 3× (yellow card) 6× (suspension) | Report | 3× (yellow card) 5× (suspension) 1× (red card) | Športová hala Na Zábraní, Hlohovec; Attendance: 1,400; Referees: Lillepea, Kull (EST) |

| 8 November 2015; 18:00 | Lithuania | 27–27 | Bosnia and Herzegovina | Kaunas Sports Hall, Kaunas; Attendance: 1,500; Referees: Álvarez, Bustamante (ESP) |
| 8 November 2015; 18:00 | Petreikis 8 | (12–14) | Prce 6 | Kaunas Sports Hall, Kaunas; Attendance: 1,500; Referees: Álvarez, Bustamante (ESP) |
| 8 November 2015; 18:00 | 3× (yellow card) 6× (suspension) 1× (red card) | Report | 3× (yellow card) 4× (suspension) | Kaunas Sports Hall, Kaunas; Attendance: 1,500; Referees: Álvarez, Bustamante (ESP) |

| 6 January 2016; 19:15 | Kosovo | 29–33 | Bosnia and Herzegovina | Shani Nushi Sports Hall, Gjakovë; Attendance: 1,000; Referees: Cindrić, Gonzurek (CRO) |
| 6 January 2016; 19:15 | Terziqi 9 | (13–17) | Prce 9 | Shani Nushi Sports Hall, Gjakovë; Attendance: 1,000; Referees: Cindrić, Gonzurek (CRO) |
| 6 January 2016; 19:15 | 3× (yellow card) 2× (suspension) | Report | 2× (yellow card) | Shani Nushi Sports Hall, Gjakovë; Attendance: 1,000; Referees: Cindrić, Gonzurek (CRO) |

| 7 January 2016; 19:00 | Lithuania | 18–18 | Slovakia | Kaunas Sports Hall, Kaunas; Attendance: 2,000; Referees: Baumgart, Wild (GER) |
| 7 January 2016; 19:00 | Bernatonis 6 | (10–7) | Urban 7 | Kaunas Sports Hall, Kaunas; Attendance: 2,000; Referees: Baumgart, Wild (GER) |
| 7 January 2016; 19:00 | 3× (yellow card) 4× (suspension) | Report | 3× (yellow card) 4× (suspension) | Kaunas Sports Hall, Kaunas; Attendance: 2,000; Referees: Baumgart, Wild (GER) |

| 9 January 2016; 18:00 | Slovakia | 31–27 | Lithuania | Športová hala Na Zábraní, Hlohovec; Attendance: 1,800; Referees: Katsikis, Michailidis (GRE) |
| 9 January 2016; 18:00 | Antl 6 | (19–10) | Malašinskas 6 | Športová hala Na Zábraní, Hlohovec; Attendance: 1,800; Referees: Katsikis, Michailidis (GRE) |
| 9 January 2016; 18:00 | 4× (yellow card) 7× (suspension) | Report | 2× (yellow card) 4× (suspension) | Športová hala Na Zábraní, Hlohovec; Attendance: 1,800; Referees: Katsikis, Michailidis (GRE) |

| 9 January 2016; 20:15 | Bosnia and Herzegovina | 41–25 | Kosovo | KSPC Mejdan, Tuzla; Attendance: 3,500; Referees: Ben-Dan, Faran (ISR) |
| 9 January 2016; 20:15 | Ovčina 9 | (18–13) | Jupa 5 | KSPC Mejdan, Tuzla; Attendance: 3,500; Referees: Ben-Dan, Faran (ISR) |
| 9 January 2016; 20:15 | 3× (yellow card) 7× (suspension) | Report | 2× (yellow card) 6× (suspension) | KSPC Mejdan, Tuzla; Attendance: 3,500; Referees: Ben-Dan, Faran (ISR) |

| 13 January 2016; 18:00 | Slovakia | 24–26 | Bosnia and Herzegovina | Športová hala Na Zábraní, Hlohovec; Attendance: 1,888; Referees: Hansen, Pettersen (NOR) |
| 13 January 2016; 18:00 | Antl 6 | (12–13) | Zulfić 6 | Športová hala Na Zábraní, Hlohovec; Attendance: 1,888; Referees: Hansen, Pettersen (NOR) |
| 13 January 2016; 18:00 | 3× (yellow card) 3× (suspension) 1× (red card) | Report | 3× (yellow card) 6× (suspension) | Športová hala Na Zábraní, Hlohovec; Attendance: 1,888; Referees: Hansen, Pettersen (NOR) |

| 13 January 2016; 19:00 | Lithuania | 42–23 | Kosovo | Kaunas Sports Hall, Kaunas; Attendance: 1,200; Referees: Butskevich, Butskevich (BLR) |
| 13 January 2016; 19:00 | three players 7 | (21–11) | Jupa 9 | Kaunas Sports Hall, Kaunas; Attendance: 1,200; Referees: Butskevich, Butskevich (BLR) |
| 13 January 2016; 19:00 | 3× (yellow card) 3× (suspension) | Report | 3× (yellow card) 4× (suspension) | Kaunas Sports Hall, Kaunas; Attendance: 1,200; Referees: Butskevich, Butskevich (BLR) |

| 17 January 2016; 17:00 | Kosovo | 22–26 | Slovakia | Shani Nushi Sports Hall, Gjakovë; Attendance: 700; Referees: Čerņavskis, Bogdanovs (LAT) |
| 17 January 2016; 17:00 | Krasniqi, Ramadani 5 | (12–15) | Urban 8 | Shani Nushi Sports Hall, Gjakovë; Attendance: 700; Referees: Čerņavskis, Bogdanovs (LAT) |
| 17 January 2016; 17:00 | 3× (yellow card) 4× (suspension) | Report | 2× (yellow card) 3× (suspension) | Shani Nushi Sports Hall, Gjakovë; Attendance: 700; Referees: Čerņavskis, Bogdanovs (LAT) |

| 17 January 2016; 20:15 | Bosnia and Herzegovina | 31–22 | Lithuania | KSPC Mejdan, Tuzla; Attendance: 4,000; Referees: Miklós, Hucker (HUN) |
| 17 January 2016; 20:15 | Malinović 6 | (15–14) | Petreikis 6 | KSPC Mejdan, Tuzla; Attendance: 4,000; Referees: Miklós, Hucker (HUN) |
| 17 January 2016; 20:15 | 3× (yellow card) 4× (suspension) | Report | 1× (yellow card) 4× (suspension) 1× (red card) | KSPC Mejdan, Tuzla; Attendance: 4,000; Referees: Miklós, Hucker (HUN) |

=== Group 2 ===
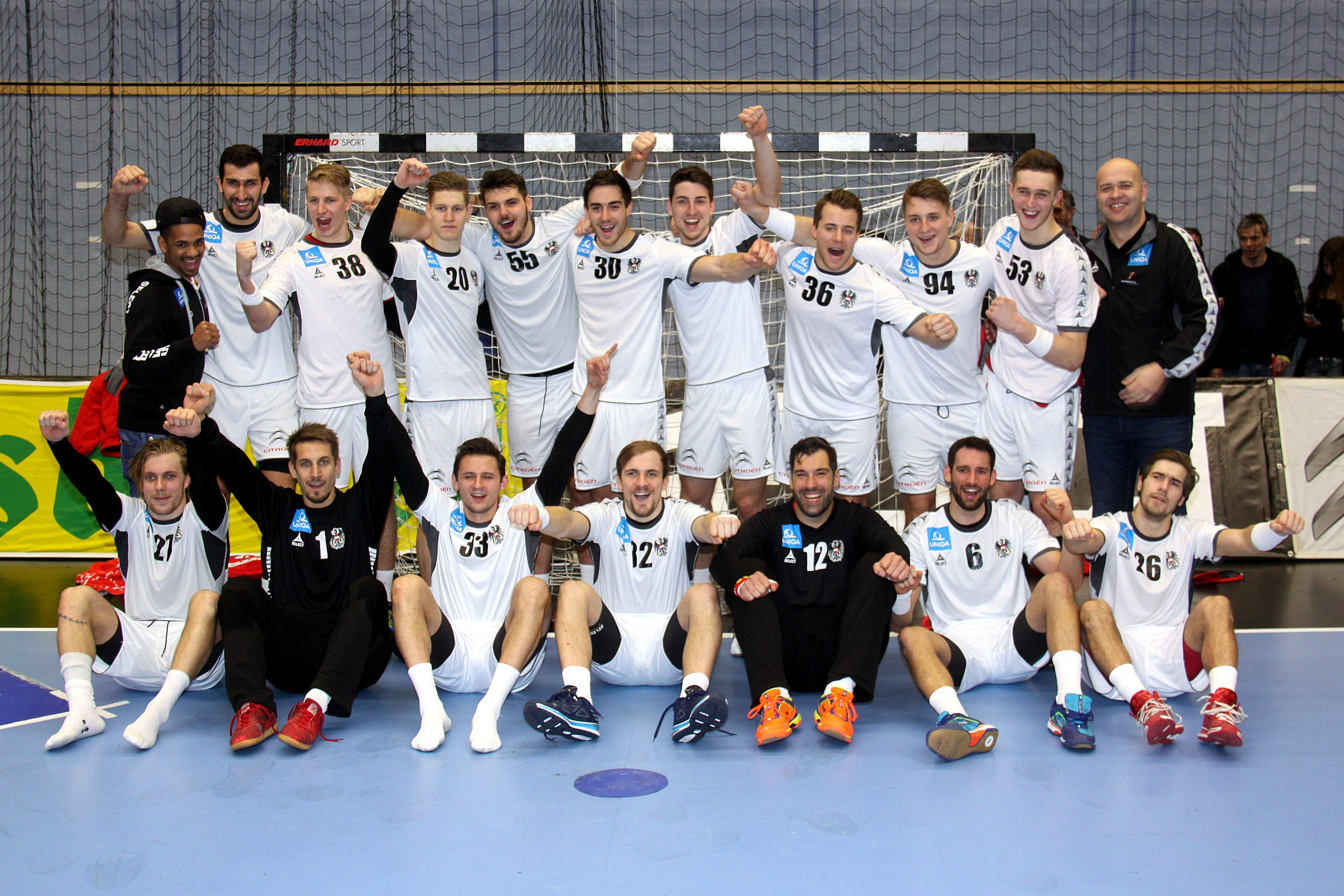
Champion of Group 2: Austria

| Pos | Team | Pld | W | D | L | GF | GA | GD | Pts | Qualification |
|---|---|---|---|---|---|---|---|---|---|---|
| 1 | Austria | 6 | 5 | 0 | 1 | 190 | 151 | +39 | 10 (Note: Austria 56–56 Romania, Austria scored more away goals and advanced) | Playoffs |
| 2 | Romania | 6 | 5 | 0 | 1 | 191 | 156 | +35 | 10 | |
| 3 | Italy | 6 | 1 | 0 | 5 | 148 | 180 | −32 | 2 (Note: Italia 52–45 Finland) | |
| 4 | Finland | 6 | 1 | 0 | 5 | 144 | 186 | −42 | 2 | |

Source: Eurohandball
Rules for classification: 1) points; 2) head-to-head points; 3) head-to-head goal difference; 4) head-to-head number of goals scored; 5) goal difference.
Notes:

| 4 November 2015; 19:30 | Italy | 27–19 | Finland | Palavis di Lavis, Lavis; Attendance: 1,100; Referees: Cabrejas, Sánchez (ESP) |
| 4 November 2015; 19:30 | Turkovic 7 | (12–11) | Tamminen 5 | Palavis di Lavis, Lavis; Attendance: 1,100; Referees: Cabrejas, Sánchez (ESP) |
| 4 November 2015; 19:30 | 3× (yellow card) 6× (suspension) | Report | 2× (yellow card) 7× (suspension) 1× (red card) | Palavis di Lavis, Lavis; Attendance: 1,100; Referees: Cabrejas, Sánchez (ESP) |

| 4 November 2015; 20:25 | Austria | 27–24 | Romania | Bundessport- und Freizeitzentrum Südstadt, Maria Enzersdorf; Attendance: 1,500; Referees: Togstad, Kristiansen (NOR) |
| 4 November 2015; 20:25 | three players 6 | (13–9) | Ghionea 9 | Bundessport- und Freizeitzentrum Südstadt, Maria Enzersdorf; Attendance: 1,500; Referees: Togstad, Kristiansen (NOR) |
| 4 November 2015; 20:25 | 3× (yellow card) 3× (suspension) | Report | 3× (yellow card) 3× (suspension) | Bundessport- und Freizeitzentrum Südstadt, Maria Enzersdorf; Attendance: 1,500; Referees: Togstad, Kristiansen (NOR) |

| 7 November 2015; 17:00 | Finland | 29–32 | Austria | Energia Areena, Vantaa; Attendance: 1,300; Referees: Pandžić, Šatordžija (BIH) |
| 7 November 2015; 17:00 | Tamminen 11 | (11–13) | Zeiner 7 | Energia Areena, Vantaa; Attendance: 1,300; Referees: Pandžić, Šatordžija (BIH) |
| 7 November 2015; 17:00 | 3× (yellow card) 5× (suspension) | Report | 3× (yellow card) 5× (suspension) | Energia Areena, Vantaa; Attendance: 1,300; Referees: Pandžić, Šatordžija (BIH) |

| 8 November 2015; 18:00 | Romania | 35–22 | Italy | Sala Polivalentă, Călărași; Attendance: 1,500; Referees: Herczeg, Südi (HUN) |
| 8 November 2015; 18:00 | Sadoveac 6 | (13–12) | Turkovic 9 | Sala Polivalentă, Călărași; Attendance: 1,500; Referees: Herczeg, Südi (HUN) |
| 8 November 2015; 18:00 | 3× (yellow card) 8× (suspension) | Report | 2× (yellow card) 5× (suspension) | Sala Polivalentă, Călărași; Attendance: 1,500; Referees: Herczeg, Südi (HUN) |

| 6 January 2016; 16:00 | Finland | 21–34 | Romania | Energia Areena, Vantaa; Attendance: 800; Referees: Kurtagic, Wetterwik (SWE) |
| 6 January 2016; 16:00 | Sundberg 6 | (9–20) | Ghionea 7 | Energia Areena, Vantaa; Attendance: 800; Referees: Kurtagic, Wetterwik (SWE) |
| 6 January 2016; 16:00 | 3× (yellow card) 2× (suspension) | Report | 2× (yellow card) 6× (suspension) | Energia Areena, Vantaa; Attendance: 800; Referees: Kurtagic, Wetterwik (SWE) |

| 6 January 2016; 18:00 | Italy | 27–40 | Austria | PalaTrieste, Trieste; Attendance: 3,290; Referees: Gasmi, Gasmi (FRA) |
| 6 January 2016; 18:00 | Skatar 7 | (12–16) | Bilyk 9 | PalaTrieste, Trieste; Attendance: 3,290; Referees: Gasmi, Gasmi (FRA) |
| 6 January 2016; 18:00 | 3× (yellow card) 5× (suspension) | Report | 3× (yellow card) 3× (suspension) | PalaTrieste, Trieste; Attendance: 3,290; Referees: Gasmi, Gasmi (FRA) |

| 9 January 2016; 20:25 | Austria | 30–19 | Italy | Bundessport- und Freizeitzentrum Südstadt, Maria Enzersdorf; Attendance: 1,500; Referees: Budzák, Záhradník (SVK) |
| 9 January 2016; 20:25 | Santos 8 | (15–9) | Turkovic 9 | Bundessport- und Freizeitzentrum Südstadt, Maria Enzersdorf; Attendance: 1,500; Referees: Budzák, Záhradník (SVK) |
| 9 January 2016; 20:25 | 3× (yellow card) 2× (suspension) | Report | 2× (yellow card) 3× (suspension) | Bundessport- und Freizeitzentrum Südstadt, Maria Enzersdorf; Attendance: 1,500; Referees: Budzák, Záhradník (SVK) |

| 10 January 2016; 20:30 | Romania | 36–29 | Finland | Sala Sporturilor „Lascăr Pană”, Baia Mare; Attendance: 1,300; Referees: Boričić, Marković (SRB) |
| 10 January 2016; 20:30 | Ghionea 9 | (19–11) | Tamminen 9 | Sala Sporturilor „Lascăr Pană”, Baia Mare; Attendance: 1,300; Referees: Boričić, Marković (SRB) |
| 10 January 2016; 20:30 | 3× (yellow card) 4× (suspension) | Report | 3× (yellow card) 5× (suspension) | Sala Sporturilor „Lascăr Pană”, Baia Mare; Attendance: 1,300; Referees: Boričić, Marković (SRB) |

| 13 January 2016; 18:30 | Finland | 26–25 | Italy | Energia Areena, Vantaa; Attendance: 500; Referees: Brodbeck, Reich (GER) |
| 13 January 2016; 18:30 | Koljonen 6 | (12–12) | Skatar 9 | Energia Areena, Vantaa; Attendance: 500; Referees: Brodbeck, Reich (GER) |
| 13 January 2016; 18:30 | 3× (yellow card) 5× (suspension) | Report | 3× (yellow card) 4× (suspension) | Energia Areena, Vantaa; Attendance: 500; Referees: Brodbeck, Reich (GER) |

| 14 January 2016; 18:00 | Romania | 32–29 | Austria | Sala Sporturilor „Lascăr Pană”, Baia Mare; Attendance: 2,080; Referees: Vitaku, Vitaku (Kosovo) |
| 14 January 2016; 18:00 | Mocanu, Ramba 7 | (15–15) | Bilyk 9 | Sala Sporturilor „Lascăr Pană”, Baia Mare; Attendance: 2,080; Referees: Vitaku, Vitaku (Kosovo) |
| 14 January 2016; 18:00 | 3× (yellow card) 5× (suspension) 1× (red card) | Report | 3× (yellow card) 5× (suspension) | Sala Sporturilor „Lascăr Pană”, Baia Mare; Attendance: 2,080; Referees: Vitaku, Vitaku (Kosovo) |

| 16 January 2016; 18:30 | Italy | 28–30 | Romania | Pala San Giacomo, Conversano; Attendance: 2,400; Referees: Lah, Sok (SLO) |
| 16 January 2016; 18:30 | Maione 6 | (16–15) | Ghionea 8 | Pala San Giacomo, Conversano; Attendance: 2,400; Referees: Lah, Sok (SLO) |
| 16 January 2016; 18:30 | 3× (yellow card) 6× (suspension) | Report | 2× (yellow card) 4× (suspension) | Pala San Giacomo, Conversano; Attendance: 2,400; Referees: Lah, Sok (SLO) |

| 17 January 2016; 16:00 | Austria | 32–20 | Finland | Bundessport- und Freizeitzentrum Südstadt, Maria Enzersdorf; Attendance: 1,500; Referees: Argyridis, Mouttas (CYP) |
| 17 January 2016; 16:00 | Bilyk 7 | (17–12) | three players 4 | Bundessport- und Freizeitzentrum Südstadt, Maria Enzersdorf; Attendance: 1,500; Referees: Argyridis, Mouttas (CYP) |
| 17 January 2016; 16:00 | 3× (yellow card) 3× (suspension) | Report | 3× (yellow card) 3× (suspension) | Bundessport- und Freizeitzentrum Südstadt, Maria Enzersdorf; Attendance: 1,500; Referees: Argyridis, Mouttas (CYP) |

=== Group 3 ===
| Pos | Team | Pld | W | D | L | GF | GA | GD | Pts | Qualification |
|---|---|---|---|---|---|---|---|---|---|---|
| 1 | Latvia | 6 | 5 | 1 | 0 | 161 | 121 | +40 | 11 | Playoffs |
| 2 | Ukraine | 6 | 3 | 0 | 3 | 149 | 125 | +24 | 6 | |
| 3 | Greece | 6 | 2 | 1 | 3 | 148 | 160 | −12 | 5 | |
| 4 | Cyprus | 6 | 1 | 0 | 5 | 123 | 175 | −52 | 2 | |

Source: Eurohandball
Rules for classification: 1) points; 2) head-to-head points; 3) head-to-head goal difference; 4) head-to-head number of goals scored; 5) goal difference.

| 4 November 2015; 19:15 | Latvia | 31–22 | Greece | Sports Centre Dobele, Dobele; Attendance: 1,200; Referees: Opava, Válek (CZE) |
| 4 November 2015; 19:15 | Krištopāns 8 | (15–12) | Papadopoulos 8 | Sports Centre Dobele, Dobele; Attendance: 1,200; Referees: Opava, Válek (CZE) |
| 4 November 2015; 19:15 | 1× (yellow card) 3× (suspension) | Report | 3× (yellow card) 4× (suspension) | Sports Centre Dobele, Dobele; Attendance: 1,200; Referees: Opava, Válek (CZE) |

| 4 November 2015; 19:30 | Cyprus | 13–27 | Ukraine | University of Cyprus Athletic Center, Nicosia; Attendance: 200; Referees: Lindenbaum, Laron (ISR) |
| 4 November 2015; 19:30 | Argyrou 4 | (9–13) | Zhuk 7 | University of Cyprus Athletic Center, Nicosia; Attendance: 200; Referees: Lindenbaum, Laron (ISR) |
| 4 November 2015; 19:30 | 3× (yellow card) 4× (suspension) | Report | 3× (yellow card) 6× (suspension) | University of Cyprus Athletic Center, Nicosia; Attendance: 200; Referees: Lindenbaum, Laron (ISR) |

| 8 November 2015; 15:00 | Greece | 31–27 | Cyprus | Sport Hall "Koukouli", Patras; Attendance: 300; Referees: Scevola, Alperan (ITA) |
| 8 November 2015; 15:00 | Papadopoulos 8 | (9–9) | Nikiforou 8 | Sport Hall "Koukouli", Patras; Attendance: 300; Referees: Scevola, Alperan (ITA) |
| 8 November 2015; 15:00 | 3× (yellow card) 2× (suspension) | Report | 3× (yellow card) 3× (suspension) | Sport Hall "Koukouli", Patras; Attendance: 300; Referees: Scevola, Alperan (ITA) |

| 8 November 2015; 17:00 | Ukraine | 18–23 | Latvia | National University of Sport, Kyiv; Attendance: 800; Referees: Šniurevičius, Mykolaitis (LTU) |
| 8 November 2015; 17:00 | Tilte 7 | (8–6) | Jurdžs 9 | National University of Sport, Kyiv; Attendance: 800; Referees: Šniurevičius, Mykolaitis (LTU) |
| 8 November 2015; 17:00 | 2× (yellow card) 5× (suspension) | Report | 2× (yellow card) 2× (suspension) | National University of Sport, Kyiv; Attendance: 800; Referees: Šniurevičius, Mykolaitis (LTU) |

| 7 January 2016; 17:00 | Ukraine | 25–27 | Greece | Palace of Sports, Kyiv; Attendance: 300; Referees: Sirbu, Suponicov (MDA) |
| 7 January 2016; 17:00 | Zhukov 10 | (16–13) | three players 5 | Palace of Sports, Kyiv; Attendance: 300; Referees: Sirbu, Suponicov (MDA) |
| 7 January 2016; 17:00 | 3× (yellow card) 2× (suspension) | Report | 3× (yellow card) 2× (suspension) | Palace of Sports, Kyiv; Attendance: 300; Referees: Sirbu, Suponicov (MDA) |

| 7 January 2016; 19:00 | Cyprus | 20–28 | Latvia | University of Cyprus Athletic Center, Nicosia; Attendance: 450; Referees: Geraets, Geraets (NED) |
| 7 January 2016; 19:00 | Argyrou 7 | (5–14) | Krištopāns 7 | University of Cyprus Athletic Center, Nicosia; Attendance: 450; Referees: Geraets, Geraets (NED) |
| 7 January 2016; 19:00 | 3× (yellow card) 5× (suspension) 1× (red card) | Report | 2× (yellow card) 1× (suspension) | University of Cyprus Athletic Center, Nicosia; Attendance: 450; Referees: Geraets, Geraets (NED) |

| 10 January 2016; 15:00 | Greece | 21–27 | Ukraine | Mikra 3, Thessaloniki; Attendance: 900; Referees: Cvetko, Kavalar (SLO) |
| 10 January 2016; 15:00 | Mallios, Papadopoulos 5 | (10–17) | Tilte 8 | Mikra 3, Thessaloniki; Attendance: 900; Referees: Cvetko, Kavalar (SLO) |
| 10 January 2016; 15:00 | 2× (yellow card) 2× (suspension) | Report | 3× (yellow card) 2× (suspension) | Mikra 3, Thessaloniki; Attendance: 900; Referees: Cvetko, Kavalar (SLO) |

| 10 January 2016; 17:05 | Latvia | 34–17 | Cyprus | Vidzemes Olympic Centre, Valmiera; Attendance: 650; Referees: Jovchev, Jonchev (BUL) |
| 10 January 2016; 17:05 | Pavlovičs 9 | (15–10) | Mpotsaris 6 | Vidzemes Olympic Centre, Valmiera; Attendance: 650; Referees: Jovchev, Jonchev (BUL) |
| 10 January 2016; 17:05 | 2× (yellow card) 3× (suspension) | Report | 2× (yellow card) 6× (suspension) | Vidzemes Olympic Centre, Valmiera; Attendance: 650; Referees: Jovchev, Jonchev (BUL) |

| 13 January 2016; 18:10 | Greece | 23–23 | Latvia | Mikra 3, Thessaloniki; Attendance: 600; Referees: Jorum, Kleven (NOR) |
| 13 January 2016; 18:10 | Papadopoulos 8 | (10–12) | Jurdžs 7 | Mikra 3, Thessaloniki; Attendance: 600; Referees: Jorum, Kleven (NOR) |
| 13 January 2016; 18:10 | 2× (yellow card) 5× (suspension) | Report | 3× (yellow card) 5× (suspension) 1× (red card) | Mikra 3, Thessaloniki; Attendance: 600; Referees: Jorum, Kleven (NOR) |

| 14 January 2016; 17:00 | Ukraine | 31–19 | Cyprus | Palace of Sports, Kyiv; Attendance: 550; Referees: Sager, Styger (SUI) |
| 14 January 2016; 17:00 | Akimenko, Tilte 7 | (11–8) | J. Argyrou 5 | Palace of Sports, Kyiv; Attendance: 550; Referees: Sager, Styger (SUI) |
| 14 January 2016; 17:00 | 2× (yellow card) 2× (suspension) | Report | 3× (yellow card) 1× (suspension) | Palace of Sports, Kyiv; Attendance: 550; Referees: Sager, Styger (SUI) |

| 17 January 2016; 15:05 | Latvia | 22–21 | Ukraine | Vidzemes Olympic Centre, Valmiera; Attendance: 11,507; Referees: Aliyev, Aghakishiyev (AZE) |
| 17 January 2016; 15:05 | Krištopāns 7 | (13–10) | Akimenko 9 | Vidzemes Olympic Centre, Valmiera; Attendance: 11,507; Referees: Aliyev, Aghakishiyev (AZE) |
| 17 January 2016; 15:05 | 3× (yellow card) 3× (suspension) | Report | 3× (yellow card) 3× (suspension) | Vidzemes Olympic Centre, Valmiera; Attendance: 11,507; Referees: Aliyev, Aghakishiyev (AZE) |

| 17 January 2016; 17:00 | Cyprus | 27–24 | Greece | University of Cyprus Athletic Center, Nicosia; Attendance: 400; Referees: Bonifert, Oláh (HUN) |
| 17 January 2016; 17:00 | Argyrou 6 | (14–12) | Papadopoulos 8 | University of Cyprus Athletic Center, Nicosia; Attendance: 400; Referees: Bonifert, Oláh (HUN) |
| 17 January 2016; 17:00 | 3× (yellow card) 6× (suspension) | Report | 3× (yellow card) 7× (suspension) 1× (red card) | University of Cyprus Athletic Center, Nicosia; Attendance: 400; Referees: Bonifert, Oláh (HUN) |

=== Group 4 ===
The teams agreed to play this group in a mini-tournament format at one venue. The draw decided that Israel earned the right to host that tournament.

| Pos | Team | Pld | W | D | L | GF | GA | GD | Pts | Qualification |
|---|---|---|---|---|---|---|---|---|---|---|
| 1 | Portugal | 3 | 2 | 1 | 0 | 101 | 71 | +30 | 5 | Playoffs |
| 2 | Israel (H) | 3 | 2 | 0 | 1 | 76 | 80 | −4 | 4 | |
| 3 | Estonia | 3 | 0 | 2 | 1 | 78 | 81 | −3 | 2 | |
| 4 | Georgia | 3 | 0 | 1 | 2 | 66 | 89 | −23 | 1 | |

Source: Eurohandball
Rules for classification: 1) points; 2) head-to-head points; 3) head-to-head goal difference; 4) head-to-head number of goals scored; 5) goal difference.
(H) Hosts

| 5 November 2015; 17:15 | Portugal | 28–28 | Estonia | Drive in Arena, Tel Aviv; Attendance: 100; Referees: Mitrevski, Todorovski (MKD) |
| 5 November 2015; 17:15 | Rocha 6 | (14–14) | Patrail 11 | Drive in Arena, Tel Aviv; Attendance: 100; Referees: Mitrevski, Todorovski (MKD) |
| 5 November 2015; 17:15 | 3× (yellow card) 3× (suspension) | Report | 3× (yellow card) 3× (suspension) | Drive in Arena, Tel Aviv; Attendance: 100; Referees: Mitrevski, Todorovski (MKD) |

| 5 November 2015; 19:40 | Israel | 27–19 | Georgia | Drive in Arena, Tel Aviv; Attendance: 1,400; Referees: Dzērve, Rutkovskis (LAT) |
| 5 November 2015; 19:40 | Levy 5 | (13–8) | Chikovani 7 | Drive in Arena, Tel Aviv; Attendance: 1,400; Referees: Dzērve, Rutkovskis (LAT) |
| 5 November 2015; 19:40 | 3× (yellow card) 4× (suspension) | Report | 3× (yellow card) 6× (suspension) 1× (red card) | Drive in Arena, Tel Aviv; Attendance: 1,400; Referees: Dzērve, Rutkovskis (LAT) |

| 6 November 2015; 16:00 | Estonia | 25–28 | Israel | Drive in Arena, Tel Aviv; Attendance: 1,400; Referees: Mitrevski, Todorovski (MKD) |
| 6 November 2015; 16:00 | Rooba 8 | (13–14) | Kofman, Pomeranz 8 | Drive in Arena, Tel Aviv; Attendance: 1,400; Referees: Mitrevski, Todorovski (MKD) |
| 6 November 2015; 16:00 | 3× (yellow card) 3× (suspension) | Report | 3× (yellow card) 4× (suspension) | Drive in Arena, Tel Aviv; Attendance: 1,400; Referees: Mitrevski, Todorovski (MKD) |

| 6 November 2015; 18:15 | Georgia | 22–37 | Portugal | Drive in Arena, Tel Aviv; Attendance: 200; Referees: Dzērve, Rutkovskis (LAT) |
| 6 November 2015; 18:15 | Datukashvili 6 | (10–17) | Areia 9 | Drive in Arena, Tel Aviv; Attendance: 200; Referees: Dzērve, Rutkovskis (LAT) |
| 6 November 2015; 18:15 | 3× (yellow card) 6× (suspension) 1× (red card) | Report | 3× (yellow card) 2× (suspension) | Drive in Arena, Tel Aviv; Attendance: 200; Referees: Dzērve, Rutkovskis (LAT) |

| 7 November 2015; 17:00 | Estonia | 25–25 | Georgia | Drive in Arena, Tel Aviv; Attendance: 100; Referees: Dzērve, Rutkovskis (LAT) |
| 7 November 2015; 17:00 | Rooba 9 | (14–13) | Chikovani 8 | Drive in Arena, Tel Aviv; Attendance: 100; Referees: Dzērve, Rutkovskis (LAT) |
| 7 November 2015; 17:00 | 3× (yellow card) 5× (suspension) | Report | 3× (yellow card) 5× (suspension) | Drive in Arena, Tel Aviv; Attendance: 100; Referees: Dzērve, Rutkovskis (LAT) |

| 7 November 2015; 19:15 | Portugal | 36–21 | Israel | Drive in Arena, Tel Aviv; Attendance: 2,000; Referees: Mitrevski, Todorovski (MKD) |
| 7 November 2015; 19:15 | Rocha 9 | (20–11) | Levy 7 | Drive in Arena, Tel Aviv; Attendance: 2,000; Referees: Mitrevski, Todorovski (MKD) |
| 7 November 2015; 19:15 | 3× (yellow card) 3× (suspension) | Report | 3× (yellow card) 2× (suspension) | Drive in Arena, Tel Aviv; Attendance: 2,000; Referees: Mitrevski, Todorovski (MKD) |

=== Group 5 ===
| Pos | Team | Pld | W | D | L | GF | GA | GD | Pts | Qualification |
|---|---|---|---|---|---|---|---|---|---|---|
| 1 | Czech Republic | 4 | 3 | 0 | 1 | 128 | 119 | +9 | 6 (Note: Czech Republic 58–55 Turkey) | Playoffs |
| 2 | Turkey | 4 | 3 | 0 | 1 | 117 | 110 | +7 | 6 | |
| 3 | Belgium | 4 | 0 | 0 | 4 | 116 | 132 | −16 | 0 | |

Source: Eurohandball
Rules for classification: 1) points; 2) head-to-head points; 3) head-to-head goal difference; 4) head-to-head number of goals scored; 5) goal difference.
Notes:

| 4 November 2015; 17:10 | Czech Republic | 34–32 | Belgium | Aréna Sparta Podvinný Mlýn, Prague; Attendance: 1,400; Referees: Harabagiu, Stănescu (ROU) |
| 4 November 2015; 17:10 | Jícha 9 | (22–18) | Cauwenberghs 8 | Aréna Sparta Podvinný Mlýn, Prague; Attendance: 1,400; Referees: Harabagiu, Stănescu (ROU) |
| 4 November 2015; 17:10 | 3× (yellow card) 2× (suspension) | Report | 3× (yellow card) 2× (suspension) | Aréna Sparta Podvinný Mlýn, Prague; Attendance: 1,400; Referees: Harabagiu, Stănescu (ROU) |

| 7 November 2015; 20:00 | Belgium | 32–36 | Czech Republic | Lange Munte, Kortrijk; Attendance: 2,300; Referees: Martins, Martins (POR) |
| 7 November 2015; 20:00 | T. Bolaers 7 | (15–16) | Jícha 10 | Lange Munte, Kortrijk; Attendance: 2,300; Referees: Martins, Martins (POR) |
| 7 November 2015; 20:00 | 3× (yellow card) 4× (suspension) | Report | 3× (yellow card) 6× (suspension) | Lange Munte, Kortrijk; Attendance: 2,300; Referees: Martins, Martins (POR) |

| 6 January 2016; 20:00 | Belgium | 24–31 | Turkey | Lange Munte, Kortrijk; Attendance: 1,137; Referees: Mitrevski, Todorovski (MKD) |
| 6 January 2016; 20:00 | Kedziora 8 | (10–14) | Döne 10 | Lange Munte, Kortrijk; Attendance: 1,137; Referees: Mitrevski, Todorovski (MKD) |
| 6 January 2016; 20:00 | 3× (yellow card) 3× (suspension) | Report | 3× (yellow card) 5× (suspension) 1× (red card) | Lange Munte, Kortrijk; Attendance: 1,137; Referees: Mitrevski, Todorovski (MKD) |

| 10 January 2016; 16:00 | Turkey | 31–28 | Belgium | THF Sport Hall, Ankara; Attendance: 650; Referees: Kouz, Zhoba (UKR) |
| 10 January 2016; 16:00 | Döne 8 | (16–12) | Kedziora 6 | THF Sport Hall, Ankara; Attendance: 650; Referees: Kouz, Zhoba (UKR) |
| 10 January 2016; 16:00 | 3× (yellow card) 7× (suspension) 1× (red card) | Report | 2× (yellow card) 5× (suspension) | THF Sport Hall, Ankara; Attendance: 650; Referees: Kouz, Zhoba (UKR) |

| 13 January 2016; 19:00 | Turkey | 27–24 | Czech Republic | THF Sport Hall, Ankara; Attendance: 650; Referees: Konjicanin, Konjicanin (BIH) |
| 13 January 2016; 19:00 | Ersin, Özbahar 6 | (15–13) | Hrstka 7 | THF Sport Hall, Ankara; Attendance: 650; Referees: Konjicanin, Konjicanin (BIH) |
| 13 January 2016; 19:00 | 3× (yellow card) 3× (suspension) | Report | 3× (yellow card) 2× (suspension) | THF Sport Hall, Ankara; Attendance: 650; Referees: Konjicanin, Konjicanin (BIH) |

| 16 January 2016; 18:30 | Czech Republic | 34–28 | Turkey | Euronicshala Zlín, Zlín; Attendance: 2,000; Referees: Leszczynski, Piechota (POL) |
| 16 January 2016; 18:30 | Hrstka 8 | (17–16) | Döne 11 | Euronicshala Zlín, Zlín; Attendance: 2,000; Referees: Leszczynski, Piechota (POL) |
| 16 January 2016; 18:30 | 3× (yellow card) 5× (suspension) 1× (red card) | Report | 3× (yellow card) 9× (suspension) 2× (red card) | Euronicshala Zlín, Zlín; Attendance: 2,000; Referees: Leszczynski, Piechota (POL) |

=== Group 6 ===
| Pos | Team | Pld | W | D | L | GF | GA | GD | Pts | Qualification |
|---|---|---|---|---|---|---|---|---|---|---|
| 1 | Netherlands | 4 | 4 | 0 | 0 | 118 | 92 | +26 | 8 | Playoffs |
| 2 | Switzerland | 4 | 2 | 0 | 2 | 108 | 99 | +9 | 4 | |
| 3 | Luxembourg | 4 | 0 | 0 | 4 | 91 | 126 | −35 | 0 | |

Source: Eurohandball
Rules for classification: 1) points; 2) head-to-head points; 3) head-to-head goal difference; 4) head-to-head number of goals scored; 5) goal difference.

| 4 November 2015; 19:30 | Netherlands | 26–20 | Luxembourg | Topsportcentrum Almere, Almere; Attendance: 1,000; Referees: Jerlecki, Łabuń (POL) |
| 4 November 2015; 19:30 | Schagen 5 | (15–9) | Bock 7 | Topsportcentrum Almere, Almere; Attendance: 1,000; Referees: Jerlecki, Łabuń (POL) |
| 4 November 2015; 19:30 | 3× (yellow card) 5× (suspension) | Report | 3× (yellow card) 3× (suspension) | Topsportcentrum Almere, Almere; Attendance: 1,000; Referees: Jerlecki, Łabuń (POL) |

| 7 November 2015; 19:00 | Luxembourg | 30–34 | Netherlands | Centre Sportif de Differdange, Differdange; Attendance: 720; Referees: Bolic, Hurich (AUT) |
| 7 November 2015; 19:00 | Muller 10 | (13–19) | Boomhouwer, Van Olphen 5 | Centre Sportif de Differdange, Differdange; Attendance: 720; Referees: Bolic, Hurich (AUT) |
| 7 November 2015; 19:00 | 3× (yellow card) 2× (suspension) | Report | 2× (yellow card) 3× (suspension) | Centre Sportif de Differdange, Differdange; Attendance: 720; Referees: Bolic, Hurich (AUT) |

| 6 January 2016; 19:30 | Luxembourg | 23–36 | Switzerland | d'Coque, Luxembourg City; Attendance: 650; Referees: Simone, Monitillo (ITA) |
| 6 January 2016; 19:30 | Muller 6 | (8–17) | Liniger 5 | d'Coque, Luxembourg City; Attendance: 650; Referees: Simone, Monitillo (ITA) |
| 6 January 2016; 19:30 | 3× (yellow card) 2× (suspension) | Report | 3× (yellow card) 3× (suspension) | d'Coque, Luxembourg City; Attendance: 650; Referees: Simone, Monitillo (ITA) |

| 9 January 2016; 19:00 | Switzerland | 30–18 | Luxembourg | Schachenhalle, Aarau; Attendance: 2,000; Referees: Mykolaitis, Šniurevičius (LTU) |
| 9 January 2016; 19:00 | Schmid 7 | (14–9) | Muller, Wirtz 4 | Schachenhalle, Aarau; Attendance: 2,000; Referees: Mykolaitis, Šniurevičius (LTU) |
| 9 January 2016; 19:00 | 3× (yellow card) 5× (suspension) | Report | 2× (yellow card) 3× (suspension) | Schachenhalle, Aarau; Attendance: 2,000; Referees: Mykolaitis, Šniurevičius (LTU) |

| 13 January 2016; 20:00 | Switzerland | 21–24 | Netherlands | Schachenhalle, Aarau; Attendance: 2,200; Referees: Caçador, Nicolau (POR) |
| 13 January 2016; 20:00 | Schmid 7 | (14–13) | Baart 5 | Schachenhalle, Aarau; Attendance: 2,200; Referees: Caçador, Nicolau (POR) |
| 13 January 2016; 20:00 | 3× (yellow card) 2× (suspension) | Report | 3× (yellow card) 5× (suspension) | Schachenhalle, Aarau; Attendance: 2,200; Referees: Caçador, Nicolau (POR) |

| 17 January 2016; 14:00 | Netherlands | 34–21 | Switzerland | Fitland XL, Sittard; Attendance: 1,800; Referees: Kaveshnikov, Plotnikov (RUS) |
| 17 January 2016; 14:00 | Baart 6 | (18–9) | Raemy 4 | Fitland XL, Sittard; Attendance: 1,800; Referees: Kaveshnikov, Plotnikov (RUS) |
| 17 January 2016; 14:00 | 3× (yellow card) 2× (suspension) 1× (red card) | Report | 2× (yellow card) 3× (suspension) | Fitland XL, Sittard; Attendance: 1,800; Referees: Kaveshnikov, Plotnikov (RUS) |

== Play-off round ==
The six teams advancing from the first round and the twelve teams ranked outside the top three at the 2016 European Championship (not including France) competed in the play-off round. The eighteen teams were paired in a total of nine two-legged ties, with the winners qualifying for the World Championship final tournament.

=== Draw ===
The play-off round draw was held on 31 January 2016 at 13:30, in Kraków, Poland. The teams were seeded into two pots, with teams from Pot 1 (seeded) being drawn against teams from Pot 2 (unseeded).

| Pot 1 (seeded) | Pot 2 (unseeded) |
|---|---|
| Belarus; Denmark; Hungary; Iceland; Macedonia; Norway; Poland; Russia; Sweden | Austria; Bosnia and Herzegovina; Czech Republic; Latvia; Montenegro; Netherlands; Portugal; Serbia; Slovenia |

Notes

1. ^{†} Fourth-placed team from 2016 European Championship, not known at the time of the draw
2. ^{‡} Winners of the qualification first round

=== Overview ===
The first leg were played on 10–12 June 2016 and the second legs on 15–16 June 2016.

| Team 1 | Agg. | Team 2 | 1st leg | 2nd leg |
|---|---|---|---|---|
| Sweden | 54–46 | Bosnia and Herzegovina | 27–19 | 27–27 |
| Czech Republic | 55–56 | Macedonia | 28–22 | 27–34 |
| Poland | 51–46 | Netherlands | 27–21 | 24–25 |
| Russia | 58–41 | Montenegro | 29–22 | 29–19 |
| Serbia | 50–56 | Hungary | 25–26 | 25–30 |
| Iceland | 46–44 | Portugal | 26–23 | 20–21 |
| Slovenia | 51–47 | Norway | 24–18 | 27–29 |
| Belarus | 52–52 (a) | Latvia | 26–24 | 26–28 |
| Denmark | 58–47 | Austria | 35–27 | 23–20 |

=== Matches ===
| 12 June 2016; 13:30 | Sweden | 27–19 | Bosnia and Herzegovina | Vida Arena, Växjö; Attendance: 5,823; Referees: Santos, Fonseca (POR) |
| 12 June 2016; 13:30 | Petersen, Zachrisson 6 | (12–9) | Prce 9 | Vida Arena, Växjö; Attendance: 5,823; Referees: Santos, Fonseca (POR) |
| 12 June 2016; 13:30 | 3× (yellow card) 6× (suspension) | Report | 3× (yellow card) 4× (suspension) | Vida Arena, Växjö; Attendance: 5,823; Referees: Santos, Fonseca (POR) |

| 15 June 2016; 20:15 | Bosnia and Herzegovina | 27–27 | Sweden | Dvorana Mirza Delibašić, Sarajevo; Attendance: 4,000; Referees: Gatelis, Mažeika (LTU) |
| 15 June 2016; 20:15 | Prce 8 | (14–16) | Gottfridsson 6 | Dvorana Mirza Delibašić, Sarajevo; Attendance: 4,000; Referees: Gatelis, Mažeika (LTU) |
| 15 June 2016; 20:15 | 3× (yellow card) 4× (suspension) 1× (red card) | Report | 3× (yellow card) 3× (suspension) | Dvorana Mirza Delibašić, Sarajevo; Attendance: 4,000; Referees: Gatelis, Mažeika (LTU) |

Sweden won 54–46 on aggregate.

| 11 June 2016; 12:30 | Czech Republic | 28–22 | Macedonia | Sportovní hala Euronics Zlín, Zlín; Attendance: 2,000; Referees: Sondors, Līcis (LAT) |
| 11 June 2016; 12:30 | Zdráhala 6 | (14–10) | K. Lazarov 8 | Sportovní hala Euronics Zlín, Zlín; Attendance: 2,000; Referees: Sondors, Līcis (LAT) |
| 11 June 2016; 12:30 | 3× (yellow card) 4× (suspension) | Report | 2× (yellow card) 4× (suspension) | Sportovní hala Euronics Zlín, Zlín; Attendance: 2,000; Referees: Sondors, Līcis (LAT) |

| 15 June 2016; 20:00 | Macedonia | 34–27 | Czech Republic | Boris Trajkovski Sports Center, Skopje; Attendance: 6,963; Referees: Stark, Ştefan (ROU) |
| 15 June 2016; 20:00 | Manaskov 11 | (19–11) | Zdráhala 6 | Boris Trajkovski Sports Center, Skopje; Attendance: 6,963; Referees: Stark, Ştefan (ROU) |
| 15 June 2016; 20:00 | 3× (yellow card) 1× (suspension) | Report | 3× (yellow card) 6× (suspension) | Boris Trajkovski Sports Center, Skopje; Attendance: 6,963; Referees: Stark, Ştefan (ROU) |

Macedonia won 56–55 on aggregate.

| 11 June 2016; 20:00 | Poland | 27–21 | Netherlands | Spodek, Katowice; Attendance: 6,000; Referees: Krstič, Ljubič (SLO) |
| 11 June 2016; 20:00 | Krajewski 5 | (11–9) | Steins 6 | Spodek, Katowice; Attendance: 6,000; Referees: Krstič, Ljubič (SLO) |
| 11 June 2016; 20:00 | 2× (yellow card) 5× (suspension) | Report | 3× (yellow card) 5× (suspension) | Spodek, Katowice; Attendance: 6,000; Referees: Krstič, Ljubič (SLO) |

| 15 June 2016; 19:30 | Netherlands | 25–24 | Poland | Fitland XL, Sittard; Attendance: 2,200; Referees: Johansson, Kliko (SWE) |
| 15 June 2016; 19:30 | Steins 7 | (10–13) | Syprzak 5 | Fitland XL, Sittard; Attendance: 2,200; Referees: Johansson, Kliko (SWE) |
| 15 June 2016; 19:30 | 3× (yellow card) 9× (suspension) 1× (red card) | Report | 3× (yellow card) 2× (suspension) | Fitland XL, Sittard; Attendance: 2,200; Referees: Johansson, Kliko (SWE) |

Poland won 51–46 on aggregate.

| 12 June 2016; 15:00 | Russia | 29–22 | Montenegro | Dynamo Sports Palace, Moscow; Attendance: 1,800; Referees: Dobrovits, Tájok (HUN) |
| 12 June 2016; 15:00 | Shelmenko 7 | (13–9) | Ševaljević 7 | Dynamo Sports Palace, Moscow; Attendance: 1,800; Referees: Dobrovits, Tájok (HUN) |
| 12 June 2016; 15:00 | 3× (yellow card) 5× (suspension) | Report | 1× (yellow card) 5× (suspension) | Dynamo Sports Palace, Moscow; Attendance: 1,800; Referees: Dobrovits, Tájok (HUN) |

| 15 June 2016; 18:00 | Montenegro | 19–29 | Russia | SC Topolica, Bar; Attendance: 2,500; Referees: Baďura, Ondogrecula (SVK) |
| 15 June 2016; 18:00 | Ševaljević 5 | (9–15) | Kovalyov 7 | SC Topolica, Bar; Attendance: 2,500; Referees: Baďura, Ondogrecula (SVK) |
| 15 June 2016; 18:00 | 2× (yellow card) 3× (suspension) | Report | 3× (yellow card) 4× (suspension) | SC Topolica, Bar; Attendance: 2,500; Referees: Baďura, Ondogrecula (SVK) |

Russia won 58–41 on aggregate.

| 10 June 2016; 18:00 | Serbia | 25–26 | Hungary | Kraljevo Sports Hall, Kraljevo; Attendance: 1,300; Referees: Hansen, Pettersen (NOR) |
| 10 June 2016; 18:00 | Nenadić 10 | (8–13) | Iváncsik 6 | Kraljevo Sports Hall, Kraljevo; Attendance: 1,300; Referees: Hansen, Pettersen (NOR) |
| 10 June 2016; 18:00 | 3× (yellow card) 2× (suspension) | Report | 3× (yellow card) 5× (suspension) 1× (red card) | Kraljevo Sports Hall, Kraljevo; Attendance: 1,300; Referees: Hansen, Pettersen (NOR) |

| 15 June 2016; 20:00 | Hungary | 30–25 | Serbia | Veszprém Aréna, Veszprém; Attendance: 5,019; Referees: Gousko, Repkin (BLR) |
| 15 June 2016; 20:00 | Lékai 9 | (17–12) | Nenadić 8 | Veszprém Aréna, Veszprém; Attendance: 5,019; Referees: Gousko, Repkin (BLR) |
| 15 June 2016; 20:00 | 3× (yellow card) 3× (suspension) | Report | 3× (yellow card) 2× (suspension) | Veszprém Aréna, Veszprém; Attendance: 5,019; Referees: Gousko, Repkin (BLR) |

Hungary won 56–50 on aggregate.

| 12 June 2016; 17:00 | Iceland | 26–23 | Portugal | Laugardalshöll, Reykjavík; Attendance: 2,460; Referees: Nikolov, Nachevski (MKD) |
| 12 June 2016; 17:00 | Pálmarsson 6 | (13–10) | Rocha, Rodrigues 5 | Laugardalshöll, Reykjavík; Attendance: 2,460; Referees: Nikolov, Nachevski (MKD) |
| 12 June 2016; 17:00 | 3× (yellow card) 2× (suspension) | Report | 3× (yellow card) 3× (suspension) | Laugardalshöll, Reykjavík; Attendance: 2,460; Referees: Nikolov, Nachevski (MKD) |

| 16 June 2016; 21:00 | Portugal | 21–20 | Iceland | Dragão Caixa, Porto; Attendance: 2,225; Referees: Horáček, Novotný (CZE) |
| 16 June 2016; 21:00 | Duarte 5 | (10–7) | Kárason 4 | Dragão Caixa, Porto; Attendance: 2,225; Referees: Horáček, Novotný (CZE) |
| 16 June 2016; 21:00 | 3× (yellow card) 5× (suspension) | Report | 2× (yellow card) 4× (suspension) | Dragão Caixa, Porto; Attendance: 2,225; Referees: Horáček, Novotný (CZE) |

Iceland won 46–44 on aggregate.

| 11 June 2016; 15:00 | Slovenia | 24–18 | Norway | Zlatorog Arena, Celje; Attendance: 3,490; Referees: Brunovský, Čanda (SVK) |
| 11 June 2016; 15:00 | Janc 6 | (10–8) | Bjørnsen 5 | Zlatorog Arena, Celje; Attendance: 3,490; Referees: Brunovský, Čanda (SVK) |
| 11 June 2016; 15:00 | 3× (yellow card) 5× (suspension) | Report | 1× (yellow card) 8× (suspension) | Zlatorog Arena, Celje; Attendance: 3,490; Referees: Brunovský, Čanda (SVK) |

| 15 June 2016; 19:00 | Norway | 29–27 | Slovenia | DNB Arena, Stavanger; Attendance: 5,000; Referees: Geipel, Helbig (GER) |
| 15 June 2016; 19:00 | Lie Hansen 6 | (15–13) | Bombač 8 | DNB Arena, Stavanger; Attendance: 5,000; Referees: Geipel, Helbig (GER) |
| 15 June 2016; 19:00 | 3× (yellow card) 4× (suspension) | Report | 3× (yellow card) 6× (suspension) | DNB Arena, Stavanger; Attendance: 5,000; Referees: Geipel, Helbig (GER) |

Slovenia won 51–47 on aggregate.

| 12 June 2016; 17:00 | Belarus | 26–24 | Latvia | Uručča Sports Palace, Minsk; Attendance: 2,351; Referees: Gubica, Milošević (CRO) |
| 12 June 2016; 17:00 | Rutenka 10 | (13–13) | Krištopāns 9 | Uručča Sports Palace, Minsk; Attendance: 2,351; Referees: Gubica, Milošević (CRO) |
| 12 June 2016; 17:00 | 3× (yellow card) 5× (suspension) 1× (red card) | Report | 3× (yellow card) 4× (suspension) | Uručča Sports Palace, Minsk; Attendance: 2,351; Referees: Gubica, Milošević (CRO) |

| 15 June 2016; 19:35 | Latvia | 28–26 | Belarus | Vidzemes Olympic Centre, Valmiera; Attendance: 1,450; Referees: Gjeding, Hansen (DEN) |
| 15 June 2016; 19:35 | Krištopāns 14 | (16–14) | Rutenka 7 | Vidzemes Olympic Centre, Valmiera; Attendance: 1,450; Referees: Gjeding, Hansen (DEN) |
| 15 June 2016; 19:35 | 2× (yellow card) 9× (suspension) 1× (red card) | Report | 3× (yellow card) 9× (suspension) | Vidzemes Olympic Centre, Valmiera; Attendance: 1,450; Referees: Gjeding, Hansen (DEN) |

52–52 on aggregate. Belarus won on away goals.

| 12 June 2016; 20:15 | Denmark | 35–27 | Austria | Arena Fyn, Odense; Attendance: 3,945; Referees: Dinu, Din (ROU) |
| 12 June 2016; 20:15 | Søndergaard 8 | (15–12) | Weber 7 | Arena Fyn, Odense; Attendance: 3,945; Referees: Dinu, Din (ROU) |
| 12 June 2016; 20:15 | 3× (yellow card) 6× (suspension) | Report | 3× (yellow card) 6× (suspension) | Arena Fyn, Odense; Attendance: 3,945; Referees: Dinu, Din (ROU) |

| 15 June 2016; 20:25 | Austria | 20–23 | Denmark | Albert Schultz Eishalle, Vienna; Attendance: 4,000; Referees: Lopéz, Ramírez (ESP) |
| 15 June 2016; 20:25 | Weber 7 | (9–12) | Damgaard, Svan Hansen 4 | Albert Schultz Eishalle, Vienna; Attendance: 4,000; Referees: Lopéz, Ramírez (ESP) |
| 15 June 2016; 20:25 | 3× (yellow card) 5× (suspension) | Report | 3× (yellow card) 5× (suspension) 1× (red card) | Albert Schultz Eishalle, Vienna; Attendance: 4,000; Referees: Lopéz, Ramírez (ESP) |

Denmark won 58–47 on aggregate.
