= Sérgio Lopes (handballer) =

Angolan handball player

Personal information
- Full name: Sérgio Avelino de Olivera Lopes
- Nationality: Angolan
- Born: 2 June 1983 (age 43)
- Height: 1.90 m (6 ft 3 in)

Sport
- Sport: Handball
- Position: Left back
- Current club: AS Hammamet
National team
Years	Team	Apps	(Gls)
–	Angola	58	(161)
Medal record
African Championship
Bronze medal – third place	Egypt 2016

Sérgio Avelino de Olivera Lopes (born 2 June 1983) is an Angolan handball player for Association Sportive d'Hammamet and the Angolan national team.

He participated at the 2017 World Men's Handball Championship.

In 2017, he signed a one-year deal with Tunisian side Association Sportive d'Hammamet.
