= Kindarena =

Arena in Rouen, France

- Interactive map of Kindarena
- Full name: Palais des Sports de Rouen
- Location: Rouen, Seine-Maritime, France
- Coordinates: 49.4479°N 1.0634°E

The Rouen Sports Palace (French: Palais des sports de Rouen), named the Kindarena due to naming rights, is a multi-sports hall located in Rouen, France.

== History ==
In the spring of 2021, the sports arena hosted a vaccination center as part of the country's Covid-19 vaccination campaign.

== Naming ==
The name of the Sports Palace was revealed on November 16, 2011: it was known as "Kindarena," a name derived from the Kinder brand of the Ferrero group and the word arena, as part of a naming rights agreement.
