= Kristian Bjørnsen =

Norwegian handball player (born 1989)

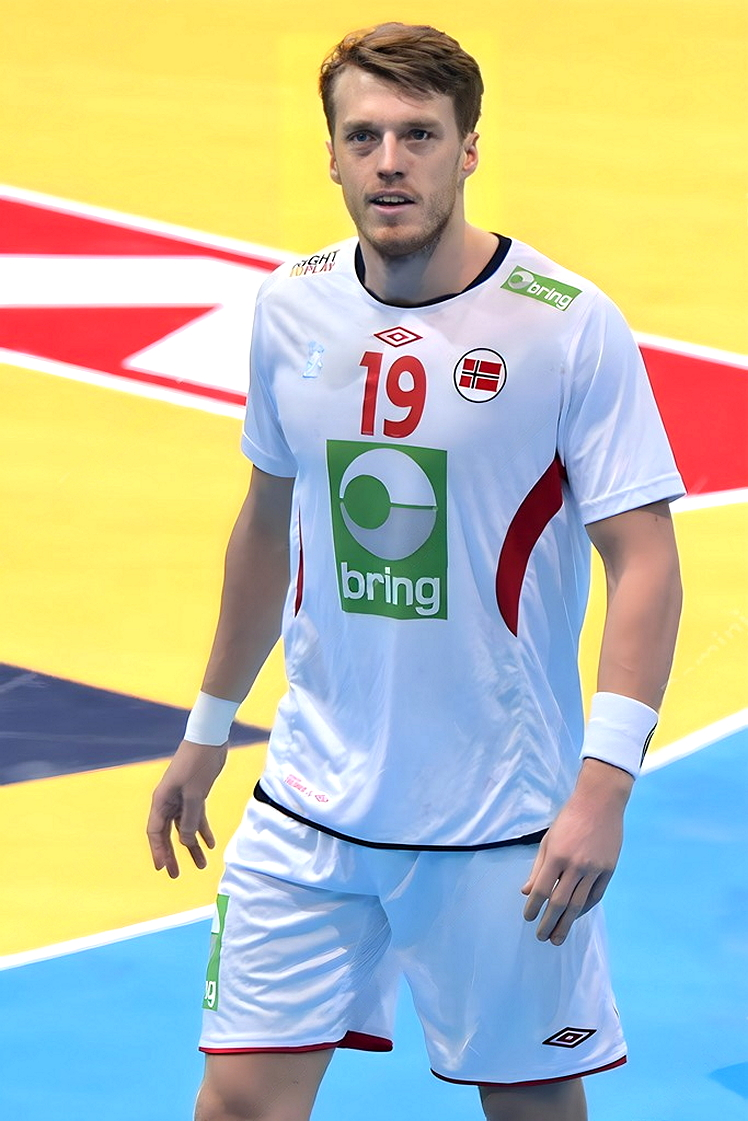
- Bjørnsen in 2016

Personal information
- Nationality: Norwegian
- Born: 10 January 1989 (age 37) Stavanger, Norway
- Height: 1.92 m (6 ft 4 in)

Sport
- Sport: Handball
- Position: Right wing
- Current club: Retired

Senior clubs
- Years: Team
- –2014: FyllingenBergen
- 2014–2016: IFK Kristianstad
- 2016–2021: HSG Wetzlar
- 2021–2026: Aalborg Håndbold
National team
Years	Team	Apps	(Gls)
2012–2025	Norway	215	(756)
Medal record
World Championship
Silver medal – second place	2017 France
Silver medal – second place	2019 Germany/Denmark
European Championship
Bronze medal – third place	2020 Sweden/Austria/Norway

Kristian Bjørnsen (born 10 January 1989) is a retired Norwegian handball player, who last played for Aalborg Håndbold and formerly the Norwegian national team.

His younger sister, Line Bjørnsen and his brother Erik Bjørnsen were also professional handballers.

== Career ==
Bjørnsen played for Stavanger Håndbold in his hometown until 2009, where he joined top flight team Fyllingen Håndball. In 2014 he transferred to Swedish first league team IFK Kristianstad. Here he won the Swedish Championship in 2015 and 2016.

In 2016 he switched to the German Bundesliga team HSG Wetzlar.

In 2021 he joined Danish top team Aalborg Håndbold. Here he won the Danish Supercup in 2023 and the Danish Championship in 2024. In 2025 he won the Danish Cup. Later the same season he won the Danish championship.

In February 2026 he announced his retirement after the 2025-26 season. In his last season he won another Danish Championship.

== Individual awards ==
- All-Star Right Wing of the World Championship: 2017
