= Rúnar Kárason =

Icelandic handball player (born 1988)

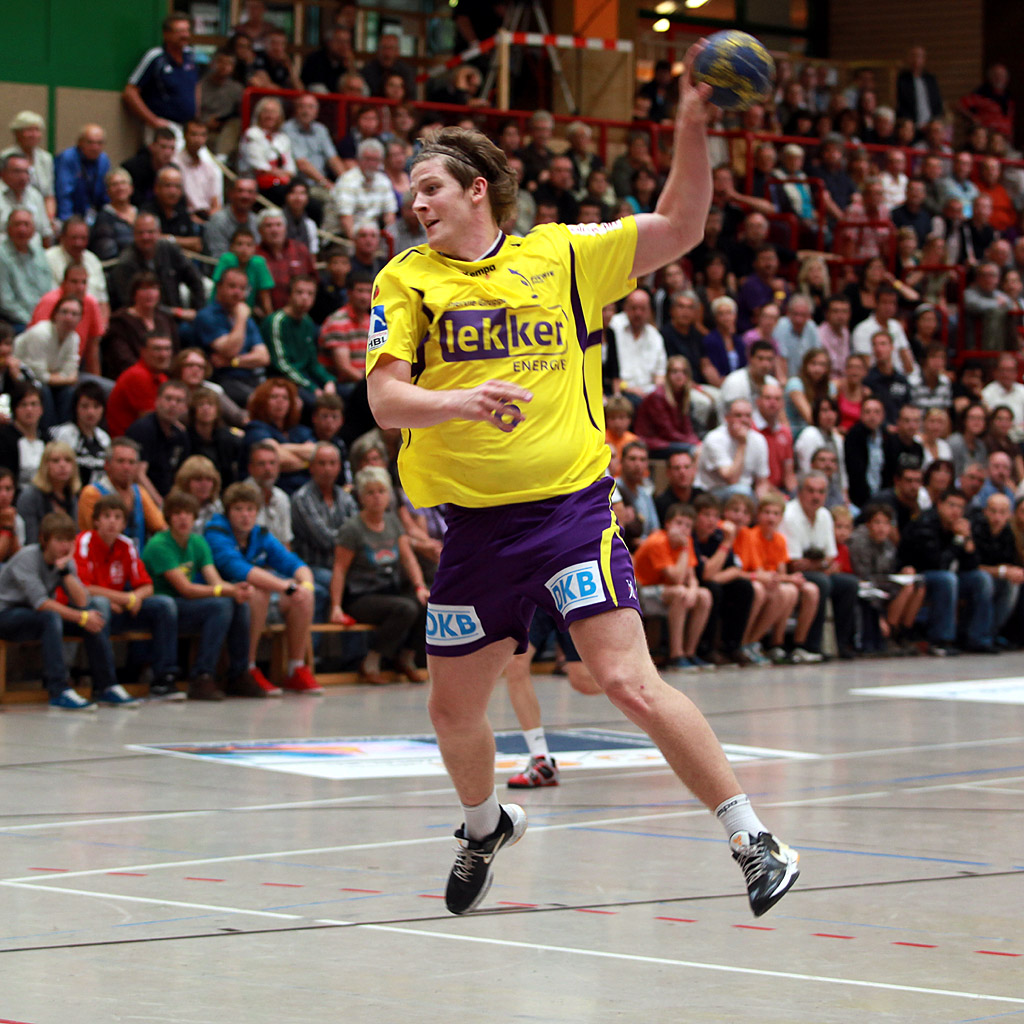

Personal information
- Nationality: Icelandic
- Born: 24 May 1988 (age 38) Reykjavík, Iceland
- Height: 1.96 m (6 ft 5 in)

Sport
- Sport: Handball
- Position: Right back
- Current club: Fram Reykjavík
- Number: 5

Senior clubs
- Years: Team
- –2009: Fram Reykjavík
- 2009–2011: Füchse Berlin
- 2011–2012: Bergischer HC
- 2012–2013: TV Großwallstadt
- 2013–2013: Rhein-Neckar Löwen
- 2013–2018: TSV Hannover-Burgdorf
- 2018–2021: Ribe-Esbjerg HH
- 2021–2023: ÍBV
- 2023–: Fram Reykjavík
National team
Years	Team	Apps	(Gls)
–	Iceland	88	(214)

Rúnar Kárason (born 24 May 1988) is an Icelandic handball player for Fram Reykjavík and the Icelandic national team.
