= European Cup and EHF Champions League records and statistics =

This page details statistics of the Handball European Cup and Champions League.

== General performances ==
=== By club ===
Performance in the European Cup/EHF Champions League by club
Club	Winners	Runners-up	Years won	Years runner-up
(Spain) Barcelona	13	5	1991, 1996, 1997, 1998, 1999, 2000, 2005, 2011, 2015, 2021, 2022, 2024, 2026	1990, 2001, 2010, 2013, 2020
(West Germany) VfL Gummersbach	5	1	1967, 1970, 1971, 1974, 1983	1972
(Germany) SC Magdeburg	5	0	1978, 1981, 2002, 2023, 2025	—
(Germany) THW Kiel	4	4	2007, 2010, 2012, 2020	2000, 2008, 2009, 2014
(Czechoslovakia) Dukla Prague	3	2	1957, 1963, 1984	1967, 1968
(Spain) Ciudad Real	3	2	2006, 2008, 2009	2005, 2011
(Soviet Union) SKA Minsk	3	0	1987, 1989, 1990	—
(Croatia) Zagreb	2	4	1992, 1993	1995, 1997, 1998, 1999
(Romania) Steaua Bucureşti	2	2	1968, 1977	1971, 1989
(West Germany) Frisch Auf Göppingen	2	1	1960, 1962	1959
(Socialist Federal Republic of Yugoslavia) Metaloplastika	2	1	1985, 1986	1984
(West Germany) TV Großwallstadt	2	0	1979, 1980	—
(France) Montpellier	2	0	2003, 2018	—
(North Macedonia) RK Vardar	2	0	2017, 2019	—
(Socialist Federal Republic of Yugoslavia) Bjelovar	1	2	1972	1962, 1973
(Soviet Union) CSKA Moscow	1	2	1988	1977, 1983
(Spain) Portland San Antonio	1	2	2001	2003, 2006
(Germany) Flensburg-Handewitt	1	2	2014	2004, 2007
(Poland) Iskra Kielce	1	2	2016	2022, 2023
(Romania) Dinamo Bucureşti	1	1	1965	1963
(Soviet Union) MAI Moscow	1	1	1973	1974
(Socialist Federal Republic of Yugoslavia) Borac Banja Luka	1	1	1976	1975
(Hungary) Budapest Honvéd	1	1	1982	1966
(Spain) CB Cantabria	1	1	1994	1992
(Spain) Bidasoa Irún	1	1	1995	1996
(Sweden) Redbergslids IK	1	0	1959	—
(East Germany) DHfK Leipzig	1	0	1966	—
(East Germany) ASK Frankfurt/Oder	1	0	1975	—
(Slovenia) Celje	1	0	2004	—
(Germany) HSV Hamburg	1	0	2013	—
(Hungary) Veszprém KC	0	4	—	2002, 2015, 2016, 2019
(Poland) Wybrzeże Gdańsk	0	2	—	1986, 1987
(Denmark) Aalborg Håndbold	0	2	—	2021, 2024
(Germany) Füchse Berlin	0	2	—	2025, 2026
(Sweden) Örebro SK	0	1	—	1957
(Denmark) Aarhus GF	0	1	—	1960
(Socialist Federal Republic of Yugoslavia) Medveščak Zagreb	0	1	—	1965
(East Germany) Dynamo Berlin	0	1	—	1970
(Denmark) Fredericia KFUM	0	1	—	1976
(Poland) Śląsk Wrocław	0	1	—	1978
(East Germany) Empor Rostock	0	1	—	1979
(Iceland) Valur	0	1	—	1980
(Socialist Federal Republic of Yugoslavia) Slovan Ljubljana	0	1	—	1981
(Switzerland) TSV St. Otmar St. Gallen	0	1	—	1982
(Spain) Atlético Madrid	0	1	—	1985
(West Germany) TUSEM Essen	0	1	—	1988
(Socialist Federal Republic of Yugoslavia) Proleter Zrenjanin	0	1	—	1991
(Germany) Wallau-Massenheim	0	1	—	1993
(Portugal) ABC Braga	0	1	—	1994
(Spain) Atlético de Madrid	0	1	—	2012
(France) Paris Saint-Germain	0	1	—	2017
(France) HBC Nantes	0	1	—	2018

Source for years 1994-present.

=== By nation ===
Country	Winners	Runners-up	Winning clubs	Runners-up
Spain	18	13	Barcelona (12); Ciudad Real (3); TEKA Santander (1), Bidasoa Irún (1), Portland San Antonio (1)	Barcelona (5); Portland San Antonio (2), Ciudad Real (2); TEKA Santander (1), Bidasoa Irún (1), Atlético Madrid (1), Atlético de Madrid (1)
Germany	18	11	VfL Gummersbach (5); THW Kiel (4); Magdeburg* (3), Frisch Auf Göppingen (2), TV Großwallstadt (2)Hamburg (1), Flensburg-Handewitt(1)	THW Kiel (4); Flensburg-Handewitt (2); Frisch Auf Göppingen (1), VfL Gummersbach (1), TUSEM Essen (1), Wallau-Massenheim (1), Füchse Berlin (1)
Soviet Union ^{[A]}	5	3	SKA Minsk (3); MAI Moscow (1), CSKA Moscow (1)	CSKA Moscow (2); MAI Moscow (1)
Yugoslavia ^{[B]}	4	7	Metaloplastika (2); Bjelovar (1), Borac Banja Luka (1)	Bjelovar (2); Medveščak Zagreb (1), Borac Banja Luka (1), Slovan Ljubljana (1), Metaloplastika (1), Proleter Zrenjanin (1)
East Germany	4	2	Magdeburg* (2); SC Leipzig (1), ASK Frankfurt/Oder (1)	Dynamo Berlin (1), Empor Rostock (1)
Romania	3	3	Steaua București (2); Dinamo București (1)	Steaua București (2); Dinamo București (1)
Czechoslovakia ^{[C]}	3	2	Dukla Prague (3)	Dukla Prague (2)
Croatia	2	4	Zagreb (2)	Zagreb (4)
France	2	2	Montpellier (2)	Paris Saint-Germain (1) HBC Nantes (1)
North Macedonia	2	0	RK Vardar (2)	—
Hungary	1	5	Honvéd (1)	Honvéd (1), MVM Veszprém (4)
Poland	1	5	PGE Vive Kielce (1)	Wybrzeże Gdańsk (2), PGE Vive Kielce (2), Śląsk Wrocław (1)
Sweden	1	1	Redbergslids IK (1)	Örebro SK (1)
Slovenia	1	0	Celje (1)	—
Denmark	0	4	—	Aarhus GF (1), Fredericia KFUM (1), Aalborg Håndbold (2)
Iceland	0	1	—	Valur (1)
Switzerland	0	1	—	TSV St. Otmar St. Gallen (1)
Portugal	0	1	—	ABC Braga (1)

Some countries ceased to exist during the early 1990s. SC Magdeburg is the only handball club who has won the European club title while representing two different countries (e.g. East Germany and Germany).

==== Notes ====
- **^{A}** Results until the Dissolution of the Soviet Union in 1991. Three out of five titles were won by clubs from present day Belarus, while two titles and the additional three times runners-up were achieved by clubs from present day Russia.
- **^{B}** Results until the Breakup of Yugoslavia in the early 1990s. Clubs from present day Serbia won the title two times and were runners-up additional two times, clubs from present day Croatia won the title once and were runners-up three times, clubs from present day Bosnia and Herzegovina won the title once and were runners-up once, while clubs from present day Slovenia were runners-up one time.
- **^{C}** Results until the Dissolution of Czechoslovakia in 1993. Three titles and two times runners-up were all achieved by HC Dukla Prague.

=== Number of participating clubs of the Champions League era ===
The following is a list of clubs that have played in or qualified for the Champions League group stages.

As of June 2026

Nation	#	Clubs	Years
Denmark (13)	13	GOG Svendborg	1995–96, 1996–97, 1998–99, 2000–01, **2004–05**, **2006–07**, **2007–08**, **2008–09**, 2019–20, **2022–23**, 2023–24, 2025–26, 2026–27
Denmark (13)	12	KIF Kolding	1994–95, 2001–02, **2002–03**, **2003–04**, **2004–05**, **2005–06**, **2006–07**, **2009–10**, **2010–11**, **2013–14**, **2014–15**, **2015–16**
Denmark (13)	12	Aalborg	2010–11, **2013–14**, **2014–15, 2017–18**, **2019–20**, **2020–21**, **2021–22**, 2022–23, **2023–24**, **2024–25**, **2025–26**, 2026–27
Denmark (13)	5	Skjern	1999–2000, **2003–04**, 2015–16, **2017–18**, 2018–19
Denmark (13)	4	Bjerringbro-Silkeborg	2011–12, **2012–13**, **2016–17**, 2018–19
Denmark (13)	2	FCK Håndbold	**2008–09**, **2009–10**
Denmark (13)	1	Virum-Sorgenfri	1997–98
Denmark (13)	1	Aarhus GF	**2005–06**
Denmark (13)	1	Viborg HK	2007–08
Denmark (13)	1	AG København	**2011–12**
Denmark (13)	1	Team Tvis Holstebro	2016–17
Denmark (13)	1	Fredericia HK	2024–25
Denmark (13)	1	SAH Aarhus	2026–27
Germany (10)	26	THW Kiel	1994–95, 1995–96, **1996–97**, **1998–99**, **1999–2000**, **2000–01**, **2002–03**, **2004–05**, **2005–06**, **2006–07**, **2007–08**, **2008–09**, **2009–10**, **2010–11**, **2011–12**, **2012–13**, **2013–14**, **2014–15**, **2015–16**, **2016–17**, **2017–18**, **2019–20**, **2020–21**, **2021–22**, **2022–23**, **2023–24**
Germany (10)	17	Flensburg	**2003–04**, **2004–05**, **2005–06**, **2006–07**, **2007–08**, **2008–09**, **2010–11**, **2012–13**, **2013–14**, **2014–15**, **2015–16**, **2016–17**, **2017–18**, **2018–19**, **2019–20**, **2020–21**, **2021–22**
Germany (10)	9	Rhein-Neckar Löwen	**2008–09**, **2009–10**, **2010–11**, **2013–14**, **2014–15**, **2015–16**, **2016–17**, **2017–18**, **2018–19**
Germany (10)	9	Magdeburg	**2001–02**, **2002–03**, **2003–04**, **2005–06**, **2022–23**, **2023–24**, **2024–25**, **2025–26**, 2026–27
Germany (10)	7	Hamburg	**2007–08**, **2008–09**, **2009–10**, **2010–11**, **2011–12**, **2012–13**, **2013–14**
Germany (10)	5	Füchse Berlin	**2011–12**, **2012–13**, **2024–25**, **2025–26**, 2026–27
Germany (10)	3	TBV Lemgo	**1997–98**, **2003–04**, **2004–05**
Germany (10)	2	VfL Gummersbach	**2006–07**, **2007–08**
Germany (10)	1	Wallau-Massenheim	1993–94
Germany (10)	1	MT Melsungen	2026–27
Spain (9)	30	Barcelona	**1995–96**, **1996–97**, **1997–98**, **1998–99**, **1999–2000**, **2000–01**, **2003–04**, **2004–05**, **2005–06**, **2006–07**, **2007–08**, **2008–09**, **2009–10**, **2010–11**, **2011–12**, **2012–13**, **2013–14**, **2014–15**, **2015–16**, **2016–17**, **2017–18**, **2018–19**, **2019–20**, **2020–21**, **2021–22**, **2022–23**, **2023–24**, **2024–25**, **2025–26**, 2026–27
Spain (9)	12	Ademar León	**1997–98**, **1999–2000**, **2001–02**, **2003–04**, **2005–06**, **2007–08**, **2008–09**, **2009–10**, **2011–12**, **2012–13**, 2017–18, 2018–19
Spain (9)	9	Portland San Antonio	**1998–99**, **2000–01**, **2001–02**, **2002–03**, **2004–05**, **2005–06**, **2006–07**, **2007–08**, **2008–09**
Spain (9)	8	Ciudad Real	**2003–04**, **2004–05**, **2005–06**, **2006–07**, **2007–08**, **2008–09**, **2009–10**, **2010–11**
Spain (9)	4	La Rioja	2013–14, **2014–15**, 2015–16, 2016–17
Spain (9)	3	TEKA Santander	**1993–94**, 1994–95, **1996–97**
Spain (9)	3	Valladolid	**2006–07**, **2009–10**, **2010–11**
Spain (9)	3	Bidasoa Irún	**1994–95**, **1995–96**, 2019–20
Spain (9)	2	Atlético Madrid	**2011–12**, **2012–13**
France (9)	23	Montpellier	1998–99, 1999–2000, **2000–01**, **2002–03**, **2003–04**, **2004–05**, **2005–06**, **2006–07**, **2007–08**, **2008–09**, **2009–10**, **2010–11**, **2011–12**, 2012–13, **2014–15**, **2015–16**, **2016–17**, **2017–18**, 2018–19, **2019–20**, **2021–22**, **2023–24**, 2026–27
France (9)	16	Paris Saint-Germain	1996–97, **2005–06**, **2013–14**, **2014–15**, **2015–16**, **2016–17**, **2017–18**, **2018–19**, **2019–20**, **2020–21**, **2021–22**, **2022–23**, **2023–24**, 2024–25, 2025–26, 2026–27
France (9)	8	Chambéry	2001–02, **2003–04**, **2006–07**, **2008–09**, 2009–10, **2010–11**, 2011–12, 2012–13
France (9)	8	HBC Nantes	**2016–17**, **2017–18**, **2018–19**, **2020–21**, 2022–23, **2024–25**, **2025–26**, 2026–27
France (9)	2	Ivry	**1997–98, 2007–08**
France (9)	2	Dunkerque	2013–14, **2014–15**
France (9)	1	USAM Nîmes	1993–94
France (9)	1	OM Vitrolles	1994–95
France (9)	1	Créteil	2004–05
Norway (7)	8	Elverum	2015–16, 2016–17, 2017–18, 2018–19, 2019–20, 2020–21, 2021–22, 2022–23
Norway (7)	5	Sandefjord TIF	1993–94, 1999–2000, 2001–02, 2003–04, 2004–05, 2006–07
Norway (7)	4	Kolstad	2023–24, 2024–25, 2025–26, 2026–27
Norway (7)	3	Drammen HK	1997–98, 2007–08, 2008–09
Norway (7)	2	IL Runar	1996–97, 2000–01
Norway (7)	1	Viking HK	1998–99
Norway (7)	1	Fyllingen	2009–10
Switzerland (6)	11	Kadetten Schaffhausen	2005–06, 2006–07, 2007–08, **2010–11**, **2011–12**, 2012–13, **2014–15**, 2015–16, 2016–17, 2017–18, 2019–20
Switzerland (6)	6	Pfadi Winterthur	1995–96, **1996–97**, **1997–98**, 1998–99, **2003–04**, 2004–05
Switzerland (6)	2	Amicitia Zürich	2008–09, 2009–10
Switzerland (6)	2	Wacker Thun	2013–14, 2018–19
Switzerland (6)	1	TV Suhr	1999–2000
Switzerland (6)	1	Kriens-Luzern	2026–27
Sweden (6)	6	IK Sävehof	**2004–05**, 2005–06, 2010–11, **2011–12**, 2012–13, 2019–20
Sweden (6)	6	Kristianstad	2015–16, 2016–17, **2017–18**, 2018–19, 2019–20, 2026–27
Sweden (6)	4	Redbergslids IK	1998–99, 2000–01, **2001–02**, 2003–04
Sweden (6)	3	Hammarby IF	2006–07, 2007–08, 2008–09
Sweden (6)	2	Alingsås HK	2009–10, 2014–15
Sweden (6)	1	HK Drott	2013–14
Slovenia (5)	26	Celje	1993–94, **1996–97**, **1997–98**, **1998–99**, **1999–2000**, **2000–01**, **2001–02**, **2003–04**, **2004–05**, **2005–06**, **2006–07**, **2007–08**, **2008–09**, 2010–11, **2012–13**, **2013–14**, 2014–15, 2015–16, 2016–17, 2017–18, 2018–19, **2019–20**, 2020–21, 2022–23, 2023–24, 2026–27
Slovenia (5)	7	Gorenje	2004–05, **2005–06**, **2007–08**, **2009–10**, **2012–13**, **2013–14**, 2017–18
Slovenia (5)	2	Prule 67	**2002–03**, **2003–04**
Slovenia (5)	2	Cimos Koper	2008–09, **2011–12**
Slovenia (5)	1	Kozina	**2006–07**
North Macedonia (5)	16	Vardar Skopje	2001–02, 2002–03, 2003–04, 2004–05, 2007–08, 2009–10, **2013–14**, **2014–15**, **2015–16**, **2016–17**, **2017–18**, **2018–19**, **2019–20**, 2020–21, 2021–22, 2026–27
North Macedonia (5)	10	Metalurg Skopje	2006–07, 2008–09, **2011–12**, **2012–13**, **2013–14**, 2014–15, 2015–16, 2016–17, 2017–18, 2018–19
North Macedonia (5)	4	Pelister	2019–20, 2023–24, 2024–25, 2025–26
North Macedonia (5)	1	Prespa	1997–98
North Macedonia (5)	1	Pelister 2	2005–06
Romania (5)	10	Dinamo Bucureşti	2005–06, 2016–17, 2017–18, 2018–19, **2019–20**, 2021–22, 2022–23, 2024–25, 2025–26, 2026–27
Romania (5)	7	Constanța	2004–05, 2006–07, 2007–08, **2009–10**, 2010–11, 2011–12, 2012–13
Romania (5)	1	Săvineşti	2002–03
Romania (5)	1	Steaua București	2008–09
Romania (5)	1	Minaur	2015–16
Greece (5)	2	Panellinios	2002–03, 2006–07
Greece (5)	1	Filippos Veria	2003–04
Greece (5)	1	Athinaikos	2005–06
Greece (5)	1	ASE Douka	2008–09
Greece (5)	1	PAOK	2009–10
Poland (4)	20	Kielce	1999–2000, 2003–04, **2009–10**, 2010–11, **2011–12**, **2012–13**, **2013–14**, **2014–15**, **2015–16**, **2016–17**, **2017–18**, **2018–19**, **2019–20**, 2020–21, **2021–22**, **2022–23**, **2023–24**, 2024–25, 2025–26, 2026–27
Poland (4)	18	Wisła Płock	2002–03, 2004–05, 2005–06, 2006–07, 2008–09, **2011–12**, **2013–14**, **2014–15**, **2015–16**, 2016–17, 2017–18, **2018–19**, 2019–20, **2022–23**, 2023–24, 2024–25, 2025–26, 2026–27
Poland (4)	1	Wybrzeże Gdańsk	2000–01
Poland (4)	1	Zagłębie Lubin	2007–08
Russia (4)	18	Chekhovskiye Medvedi	2001–02, 2002–03, 2003–04, **2004–05**, 2005–06, **2006–07**, **2007–08**, **2008–09**, **2009–10**, **2010–11**, 2011–12, **2012–13**, 2014–15, 2015–16, 2016–17, 2017–18, 2018–19, 2019–20
Russia (4)	4	St. Petersburg	2010–11, 2011–12, 2012–13, 2013–14
Russia (4)	2	Kaustik Volgograd	**1998–99**, 1999–2000
Russia (4)	1	Astrakhan	2007–08
Ukraine (4)	9	Motor Zaporizhia	**2013–14**, 2014–15, **2015–16**, 2016–17, 2017–18, **2018–19**, 2019–20, 2020–21, 2021–22
Ukraine (4)	7	ZTR Zaporizhia	**1998–99**, **1999–2000**, 2003–04, **2004–05**, 2005–06, 2007–08, 2008–09
Ukraine (4)	2	Shaktar Donetsk	1996–97, 2002–03
Ukraine (4)	1	Portovyk Yuzhne	2006–07
Czech Republic (4)	8	Baník Karvina	2000–01, 2001–02, 2002–03, 2003–04, 2004–05, 2005–06, 2006–07, 2007–08
Czech Republic (4)	1	Dukla Prague	1994–95
Czech Republic (4)	1	Cabot Zubri	1997–98
Czech Republic (4)	1	Kovopetrol Plzeň	1998–99
Italy (4)	4	Trieste	1996–97, 1997–98, 2000–01, 2002–03
Italy (4)	2	Alpi Prato	1998–99, 1999–2000
Italy (4)	2	Conversano	2003–04, 2004–05
Italy (4)	1	Merano	2005–06
Iceland (4)	4	Haukar	2003–04, 2004–05, 2005–06, 2008–09
Iceland (4)	1	KA Akureyrar	1997–98
Iceland (4)	1	Valur	2007–08
Iceland (4)	1	Fram Reykjavik	2006–07
Hungary (3)	31	Veszprém	1994–95, 1995–96, **1997–98**, **1998–99**, **1999–2000**, **2001–02**, **2002–03**, **2003–04**, **2004–05**, **2005–06**, **2006–07**, 2007–08, **2008–09**, **2009–10**, **2010–11**, **2011–12**, **2012–13**, **2013–14**, **2014–15**, **2015–16**, **2016–17**, **2017–18**, **2018–19**, **2019–20**, **2020–21**, **2021–22**, **2022–23**, **2023–24**, **2024–25**, **2025–26**, 2026–27
Hungary (3)	24	Pick Szeged	**1996–97**, **2003–04**, **2004–05**, **2005–06**, **2006–07**, **2007–08**, 2008–09, 2009–10, **2010–11**, 2011–12, **2012–13**, **2014–15**, **2015–16**, **2016–17**, **2017–18**, **2018–19**, **2019–20**, 2020–21, 2021–22, 2022–23, 2023–24, **2024–25**, **2025–26**, 2026–27
Hungary (3)	1	Dunaferr SE	2000–01
Belarus (3)	12	Meshkov Brest	2004–05, 2005–06, 2006–07, 2007–08, 2014–15, **2015–16**,**2016–17**, **2017–18**, **2018–19**, 2019–20, **2020–21**, 2021–22
Belarus (3)	3	Dinamo-Minsk	2010–11, **2012–13**, 2013–14
Belarus (3)	2	SKA Minsk	1996–97, 1998–99
Portugal (3)	8	Porto	2013–14, 2015–16, **2019–20**, 2020–21, 2021–22, 2022–23, 2023–24, 2026–27
Portugal (3)	7	Sporting CP	2001–02, 2017–18, **2018–19**, 2019–20, **2024–25**, **2025–26**, 2026–27
Portugal (3)	6	Braga	**1993–94**, 1995–96, **1996–97**, **1997–98**, **2000–01**, 2016–17
Serbia (3)	5	Crvena zvezda	1996–97, 1997–98, 2004–05, 2006–07, 2008–09
Serbia (3)	5	Partizan	1999–2000, 2003–04, 2011–12, 2012–13, 2026–27
Serbia (3)	1	Vojvodina	2015–16
Austria (3)	4	Bergenz	2005–06, 2006–07, 2007–08, 2008–09
Austria (3)	1	UHK West Wien	1993–94
Austria (3)	1	HC Hard	2003–04
Croatia (2)	33	Zagreb	1993–94, **1994–95**, 1995–96, **1996–97**, **1997–98**, **1998–99**, **1999–2000**, **2000–01**, **2002–03**, **2003–04**, 2004–05, **2005–06**, 2006–07, **2007–08**, **2008–09**, **2009–10**, **2010–11**, **2011–12**, 2012–13, 2013–14, **2014–15**, **2015–16**, **2016–17**, 2017–18, **2018–19**, 2019–20, 2020–21, 2021–22, 2022–23, 2023–24, 2024–25, 2025–26, 2026–27
Croatia (2)	3	Metković	**2001–02**, 2003–04, 2004–05
Slovakia (2)	9	Tatran Prešov	**2004–05**, 2005–06, 2007–08, 2008–09, 2010–11, 2015–16, 2016–17, 2018–19, 2019–20
Slovakia (2)	2	Považská Bystrica	2003–04, 2006–07
Bosnia and Herzegovina (2)	6	Bosna Sarajevo	2003–04, 2006–07, 2007–08, 2008–09, 2009–10, **2010–11**, 2011–12
Bosnia and Herzegovina (2)	2	Izviđač	2004–05, 2005–06
Turkey (2)	5	Beşiktaş	2014–15, 2015–16, 2016–17, 2017–18, 2018–19
Turkey (2)	2	ASKI Ankara	2000–01, 2003–04
Lithuania (1)	4	Granitas Kaunas	1996–97, 2004–05, 2005–06, 2008–09
Israel (1)	3	Hapoel Rishon LeZion	1997–98, **1999–2000**, 2001–02
Finland (1)	2	Riihimäki Cocks	2018–19, 2019–20

Notes

- Team in **bold** qualified for the knockout phase.
- Nation in italics means there is no separate wikipedia article for the nation's handball league.

== Clubs ==
=== By semi-final appearances (European Cup and EHF Champions League) ===
Team	No.	Years in Semi-finals
(Spain) Barcelona	26	1983, **1990**, **1991**, 1992, 1993, **1996**, **1997**, **1998**, **1999**, **2000**, **2001**, **2005**, 2008, **2010**, **2011**, **2013**, 2014, **2015**, 2017, 2019, **2020**, **2021**, **2022**, 2023, **2024**, 2025
(Germany) THW Kiel	16	1995, 1996, 1997, **2000**, 2001, **2007**, **2008**, **2009**, **2010**, **2012**, 2013, **2014**, 2015, 2016, **2020**, 2022, 2024
(West Germany) VfL Gummersbach	10	**1967**, **1970**, **1971**, **1972**, **1974**, 1975, 1976, 1977, **1983**, 1984
(Hungary) Veszprém	10	**2002**, 2003, 2006, 2014, **2015**, **2016**, 2017, **2019**, 2020, 2022
(Czechoslovakia) Dukla Praha	9	**1957**, 1962, **1963**, 1966, **1967**, **1968**, 1980, **1984**, 1985
(Romania) Steaua București	7	**1968**, 1970, **1971**, 1975, **1977**, 1986, **1989**
(Croatia) Zagreb	7	**1992**, **1993**, **1995**, **1997**, **1998**, **1999**, 2000
(Slovenia) Celje	7	1997, 1998, 1999, 2000, 2001, **2004**, 2005
(Spain) Ciudad Real	7	2004, **2005**, **2006**, **2008**, **2009**, 2010, **2011**
(Romania) Dinamo București	6	1959, 1960, **1963**, **1965**, 1967, 1979
(Socialist Federal Republic of Yugoslavia) Metaloplastika	6	1983, **1984**, **1985**, **1986**, 1987, 1988
(Spain) Portland San Antonio	6	1999, **2001**, 2002, **2003**, **2006**, 2007
(Germany) Magdeburg	7	**1978**, **1981**, 1989, **2002**, 2004, **2023**, 2024, **2025**
(France) Paris Saint-Germain	6	2016, **2017**, 2018, 2020, 2021, 2023
(Poland) PGE Vive Kielce	6	2013, 2015, **2016**, 2019, **2022**, **2023**
(Socialist Federal Republic of Yugoslavia) Bjelovar	5	**1962**, 1968, 1971, **1972**, **1973**
(Hungary) Honvéd	5	**1966**, 1978, 1979, **1982**, 1984
(West Germany) Frisch Auf Göppingen	4	**1959**, **1960**, **1962**, 1963
(Soviet Union) CSKA Moscow	4	**1977**, 1981, **1983**, **1988**
(Germany) Flensburg-Handewitt	4	**2004**, 2006, **2007**, **2014**
(Germany) HSV Hamburg	4	2008, 2009, 2011, **2013**
(Soviet Union) MAI Moscow	3	1972, **1973**, **1974**
(West Germany) TV Großwallstadt	3	**1979**, **1980**, 1982
(Spain) Atlético Madrid	3	1980, **1985**, 1986
(Soviet Union) SKA Minsk	3	**1987**, **1989**, **1990**
(West Germany) TUSEM Essen	3	1987, **1988**, 1990
(Spain) Bidasoa Irún	3	1988, **1995**, **1996**
(Spain) TEKA Santander	3	**1992**, **1994**, 1995
(France) Montpellier	3	**2003**, 2005, **2018**
(North Macedonia) RK Vardar	3	**2017**, 2018, **2019**
(France) HBC Nantes	3	**2018**, 2021, 2025
(France) Paris UC	2	1957, 1960
(Denmark) Helsingør IF	2	1959, 1982
(Denmark) Aarhus GF	2	**1960**, 1966
(Denmark) IK Skovbakken	2	1962, 1963
(East Germany) SC Leipzig	2	**1966**, 1973
(East Germany) Dynamo Berlin	2	1968, **1970**
(Socialist Federal Republic of Yugoslavia) Borac Banja Luka	2	**1975**, **1976**
(Denmark) Fredericia KFUM	2	**1976**, 1977
(Poland) Wybrzeże Gdańsk	2	**1986**, **1987**
(Denmark) KIF Kolding	2	1992, 2002
(Germany) Rhein-Neckar Löwen	2	2009, 2011
(Denmark) Aalborg Håndbold	2	**2021**, **2024**
(Germany) Füchse Berlin	2	2012, **2025**
(Sweden) Örebro SK	1	**1957**
(Denmark) HG København	1	1957
(Sweden) Redbergslids IK	1	**1959**
(Socialist Federal Republic of Yugoslavia) Medveščak Zagreb	1	**1965**
(Switzerland) Grasshopper	1	1965
(Denmark) Ajax København	1	1965
(Soviet Union) SK Cuncevo	1	1967
(Socialist Federal Republic of Yugoslavia) Crvenka	1	1970
(Portugal) Sporting CP	1	1971
(Czechoslovakia) Tatran Prešov	1	1972
(Sweden) SolK Hellas	1	1973
(Norway) Oppsal	1	1974
(Czechoslovakia) Ruda Hvezda Bratislava	1	1974
(East Germany) ASK Frankfurt/Oder	1	**1975**
(Norway) IK Fredensborg	1	1976
(Poland) Śląsk Wrocław	1	**1978**
(Spain) Calpisa	1	1978
(East Germany) Empor Rostock	1	**1979**
(Iceland) Valur	1	**1980**
(Socialist Federal Republic of Yugoslavia) Slovan Ljubljana	1	**1981**
(Sweden) LUGI HF	1	1981
(Switzerland) St. Gallen	1	**1982**
(Iceland) FH Hafnarfjördur	1	1985
(Sweden) HK Drott	1	1989
(France) Créteil	1	1990
(Socialist Federal Republic of Yugoslavia) Proleter Zrenjanin	1	**1991**
(Turkey) Eskişehir ETİ	1	1991
(Soviet Union) Dinamo Astrakhan	1	1991
(Germany) Wallau-Massenheim	1	**1993**
(France) Vénissieux	1	1993
(Portugal) ABC Braga	1	**1994**
(France) USAM Nîmes	1	1994
(Austria) West Wien	1	1994
(Switzerland) Pfadi Winterthur	1	1996
(Germany) TBV Lemgo	1	1998
(Slovenia) Prule 67	1	2003
(Spain) Valladolid	1	2007
(Russia) Chekhovskiye Medvedi	1	2010
(Spain) Atlético Madrid	1	**2012**
(Denmark) AG København	1	2012

Team in Bold:	Finalist team in season

Note: In the 1994, 1995 and 1996 seasons there were no semi-finals as the finalists qualified via a group stage. The winners (Braga and TEKA Santander in 1994, Zagreb and Bidasoa Irún in 1995, Bidasoa Irún and Barcelona in 1996) and runners-up (Nîmes and UHK West Wien in 1994, TEKA Santander and THW Kiel in 1995, THW Kiel and Pfadi Winterthur in 1996) of the two groups are still marked as semi-finalists in the table.

=== By quarter-final and semi-final appearances (EHF Champions League) ===
Team	Years in QF (not in SF)	Years in SF	QF Apps.	SF Apps.
(Spain) Barcelona	2006, 2007, 2012, 2016	**1996**, **1997**, **1998**, **1999**, **2000**, **2001**, **2005**, 2008, **2010**, **2011**, **2013**, 2014, **2015**, 2017, 2019, **2020**, **2021**, **2022**, 2023, **2024**, 2025	25	21
(Germany) THW Kiel	1999, 2003, 2005, 2006, 2011, 2017, 2018, 2021, 2023	1995, 1996, 1997, **2000**, 2001, **2007**, **2008**, **2009**, **2010**, **2012**, 2013, **2014**, 2015, 2016, **2020**, 2022, 2024	26	17
(Hungary) Veszprém KC	1995, 1996, 1998, 1999, 2000, 2004, 2005, 2007, 2009, 2010, 2013, 2021, 2023, 2024, 2025	**2002**, 2003, 2006, 2014, **2015**, **2016**, 2017, **2019**, 2020, 2022	25	10
(Slovenia) Celje	1994, 2002, 2006	1997, 1998, 1999, 2000, 2001, **2004**, 2005	10	7
(Spain) Ciudad Real	2007	2004, **2005**, **2006**, **2008**, **2009**, 2010, **2011**	8	7
(Spain) Portland San Antonio	2008	1999, **2001**, 2002, **2003**, **2006**, 2007	7	6
(France) Paris Saint-Germain	2014, 2015, 2019, 2022, 2024	2016, **2017**, 2018, 2020, 2021, 2023	10	6
(Poland) PGE Vive Kielce	2013, 2024	2013, 2015, **2016**, 2019, **2022**, **2023**	7	6
(Croatia) Zagreb	1994, 1996, 2001, 2003, 2004, 2009, 2012, 2015, 2016	**1995**, **1997**, **1998**, **1999**, 2000	14	5
(Germany) Flensburg-Handewitt	2005, 2009, 2011, 2013, 2016, 2017, 2018, 2019, 2021, 2022	**2004**, 2006, **2007**, **2014**	14	4
(Germany) HSV Hamburg	2010	2008, 2009, 2011, **2013**	5	4
(France) Montpellier	2001, 2006, 2010, 2011, 2017, 2022, 2024	**2003**, 2005, **2018**	10	3
(North Macedonia) Vardar	2014, 2015, 2016	**2017**, 2018, **2019**	6	3
(Germany) SC Magdeburg	2003	**2002**, 2004, **2023**, 2024, **2025**	5	5
(Germany) Rhein-Neckar Löwen	2010, 2014	2009, 2011	4	2
(Spain) TEKA Santander	1997	**1994**, 1995	3	2
(Spain) Bidasoa Irún		**1995**, **1996**	2	2
(France) HBC Nantes	2019	**2018**, 2021, 2025	4	3
(Portugal) ABC Braga	1996, 1997, 1998, 2001	**1994**	5	1
(Russia) Chekhovskiye Medvedi	2008, 2009, 2011	2010	4	1
(Denmark) KIF Kolding	1995, 2003	2002	3	1
(Switzerland) Pfadi Winterthur	1997, 1998	1996	3	1
(Germany) TBV Lemgo	2004, 2005	1998	3	1
(Spain) Atlético Madrid	2013	**2012**	2	1
(Denmark) Aalborg Håndbold	2022, 2025	**2021**, **2024**	4	2
(Austria) UHK West Wien		1994	1	1
(France) USAM Nîmes		1994	1	1
(Slovenia) Prule 67		2003	1	1
(Spain) Valladolid		2007	1	1
(Denmark) AG København		2012	1	1
(Germany) Füchse Berlin		2012, **2025**	2	2
(Hungary) Pick Szeged	1997, 2004, 2015, 2017, 2019, 2025		6	0
(Spain) Ademar León	1998, 2000, 2002, 2012		4	0
(Denmark) GOG Håndbold	1996, 2008, 2023		3	0
(Ukraine) ZTR Zaporizhia	1999, 2000		2	0
(Germany) VfL Gummersbach	2007, 2008		2	0
(North Macedonia) Metalurg Skopje	2013, 2014		2	0
(Germany) Wallau-Massenheim	1994		1	0
(Norway) Sandefjord TIF	1994		1	0
(Czech Republic) Dukla Prague	1995		1	0
(France) OM Vitrolles	1995		1	0
(Russia) Kaustik Volgograd	1999		1	0
(Israel) Hapoel Rishon LeZion	2000		1	0
(Serbia and Montenegro) Lovćen Cetinje	2001		1	0
(Croatia) Metković	2002		1	0
(Sweden) Redbergslids IK	2002		1	0
(Slovenia) Cimos Koper	2012		1	0
(Denmark) Skjern Håndbold	2018		1	0
(Belarus) Meshkov Brest	2021		1	0
(Poland) Orlen Wisła Płock	2023		1	0
(Portugal) Sporting CP	2025		1	0

Team in Bold:	Finalist team in season

=== EHF Champions League Final Four ===
The history of the EHF Champions League Final Four system, which was permanently introduced in the 2009–10 season.

==== By season ====
Season	1st place	2nd place	3rd place	4th place
2009–10	(Germany) THW Kiel	(Spain) Barcelona	(Spain) Ciudad Real	(Russia) Chekhovskiye Medvedi
2010–11	(Spain) Barcelona	(Spain) Ciudad Real	(Germany) Rhein-Neckar Löwen	(Germany) HSV Hamburg
2011–12	(Germany) THW Kiel	(Spain) Atlético Madrid	(Denmark) AG København	(Germany) Füchse Berlin
2012–13	(Germany) HSV Hamburg	(Spain) Barcelona	(Poland) Vive Targi Kielce	(Germany) THW Kiel
2013–14	(Germany) Flensburg-Handewitt	(Germany) THW Kiel	(Spain) Barcelona	(Hungary) MVM Veszprém
2014–15	(Spain) Barcelona	(Hungary) MVM Veszprém	(Poland) Vive Targi Kielce	(Germany) THW Kiel
2015–16	(Poland) Vive Targi Kielce	(Hungary) MVM Veszprém	(France) Paris Saint-Germain	(Germany) THW Kiel
2016–17	(North Macedonia) RK Vardar	(France) Paris Saint-Germain	(Hungary) MVM Veszprém	(Spain) Barcelona
2017–18	(France) Montpellier Handball	(France) HBC Nantes	(France) Paris Saint-Germain	(North Macedonia) RK Vardar
2018–19	(North Macedonia) RK Vardar	(Hungary) Telekom Veszprém	(Spain) Barcelona Lassa	(Poland) PGE Vive Kielce
2019–20	(Germany) THW Kiel	(Spain) Barcelona	(France) Paris Saint-Germain	(Hungary) Telekom Veszprém
2020–21	(Spain) Barcelona	(Denmark) Aalborg Håndbold	(France) Paris Saint-Germain	(France) HBC Nantes
2021–22	(Spain) Barcelona	(Poland) Vive Kielce	(Germany) THW Kiel	(Hungary) Telekom Veszprém
2022–23	(Germany) SC Magdeburg	(Poland) Vive Kielce	(Spain) Barcelona	(France) Paris Saint-Germain
2023–24	(Spain) Barcelona	(Denmark) Aalborg Håndbold	(Germany) THW Kiel	(Germany) SC Magdeburg
2024–25	(Germany) SC Magdeburg	(Germany) Füchse Berlin	(Spain) Barcelona	(France) HBC Nantes

==== Performance by club ====
Club	1st	2nd	3rd	4th	Total
(Spain) Barcelona	5	3	3	2	13
(Germany) THW Kiel	3	1	2	3	9
(North Macedonia) Vardar	2	–	–	1	3
(Germany) SC Magdeburg	2	–	–	1	3
(Poland) PGE Vive Kielce	1	2	2	1	6
(Germany) HSV Hamburg	1	–	–	1	2
(Germany) Flensburg-Handewitt	1	–	–	–	1
(France) Montpellier	1	–	–	–	1
(Hungary) Veszprém KC	–	3	1	3	7
(France) Paris Saint-Germain	–	1	4	1	6
(France) HBC Nantes	–	1	1	1	3
(Denmark) Aalborg Håndbold	–	2	–	–	2
(Spain) Ciudad Real	–	1	1	–	2
(Germany) Füchse Berlin	–	1	–	1	2
(Spain) Atlético Madrid	–	1	–	–	1
(Germany) Rhein-Neckar Löwen	–	–	1	–	1
(Denmark) AG København	–	–	1	–	1
(Russia) Chekhovskiye Medvedi	–	–	–	1	1

=== Countries ===
- Only on eight occasions has the final of the tournament involved two teams from the same country:
  - 1996 Spain: Barcelona vs Bidasoa Irún 46–38 (23–15, 23–23)
  - 2001 Spain: Portland San Antonio vs Barcelona 52–49 (30–24, 22–25)
  - 2005 Spain: Barcelona vs Ciudad Real 56–55 (27–28, 29–27)
  - 2006 Spain: Ciudad Real vs Portland San Antonio 62–47 (25–19, 37–28)
  - 2007 Germany: THW Kiel vs Flensburg-Handewitt 57–55 (28–28, 29–27)
  - 2011 Spain: Barcelona vs Ciudad Real 27–24
  - 2014 Germany: Flensburg-Handewitt vs THW Kiel 30–28
  - 2018 France: Montpellier vs HBC Nantes 32–26
- The country providing the highest number of wins is Germany with 15 victories, shared by eight teams, VfL Gummersbach (5), THW Kiel (3), Frisch Auf Göppingen (2), TV Grosswallstadt (2), Magdeburg (1), HSV Hamburg (1) and Flensburg-Handewitt (1)

=== All-time table for semi-finalists and clubs with at least 10 participations in the main tournament ===
As of the end of the 2025/26 season

Defunct clubs
Total participations - includes unsuccessful participations in qualifications for the main tournament in addition to participations in the main tournament.

Country	Team	Main tournament										Total (Main + Qual.)						Qualifications	
Country	Team	Part.	F	Top4	F4	Pld	W	D	L	Gs	1st Ssn	Tot. Part.	Pld	W	D	L	Gs	Ent.	Q
(Denmark) DEN	Aalborg		2	3	3														
(Denmark) DEN	Aarhus GF		1	2	0														
(Denmark) DEN	Ajax København		0	2	0														
(Spain) ESP	Alicante/Calpisa		0	1	0														
(Spain) ESP	Atlético Madrid/Atlético de Madrid		2	4	1														
(Spain) ESP	Barcelona		18	27	14														
(Spain) ESP	Bidasoa Irún		2	3	0														
(Croatia) CRO	Bjelovar/Partizan Bjelovar		3	5	0														
(Bosnia and Herzegovina) BIH	Borac Banja Luka		2	2	0														
(Portugal) POR	ABC Braga		1	1	0														
(Spain) ESP	Cantabria Santander/TEKA Santander		2	3	0														
(Slovenia) SLO	Celje		1	7	0														
(Russia) RUS	Chekhovskiye Medvedi/CSKA Moscow		3	5	1														
(Spain) ESP	Ciudad Real		5	7	2														
(Denmark) DEN	HG Copenhagen		0	1	0														
(France) FRA	Créteil		0	1	0														
(Serbia) SRB	Crvenka		0	1	0														
(Russia) RUS	Cuncevo Moscow		0	1	0														
(Slovakia) SVK	Červená Hviezda Bratislava		0	1	0														
(Romania) ROM	Dinamo București		2	6	0														
(Sweden) SWE	Drott Halmstad		0	1	0														
(Czech Republic) CZE	Dukla Prague		5	9	0														
(Russia) RUS	Dynamo Astrakhan		0	1	0														
(Germany) GER	Dynamo Berlin		1	2	0														
(Germany) GER	Empor Rostock		1	1	0														
(Turkey) TUR	Eskişehir ETİ Bisküvi		0	1	0														
(Iceland) ISL	FH		0	1	0														
(Germany) GER	Flensburg-Handewitt		3	4	1														
(Germany) GER	ASK Frankfurt		1	1	0														
(Norway) NOR	Fredensborg/Ski		0	1	0														
(Denmark) DEN	Fredericia		1	2	0														
(Germany) GER	Frisch Auf Göppingen		3	4	0														
(Germany) GER	Füchse Berlin		2	3	1														
(Switzerland) SWI	Grasshopper Zurich		0	1	0														
(Germany) GER	Großwallstadt		2	3	0														
(Germany) GER	VfL Gummersbach		6	10	0														
(Denmark) DEN	Helsingør		0	2	0														
(Germany) GER	HSV Hamburg		1	4	2														
(Hungary) HUN	Honvéd Budapest		2	5	0														
(Germany) GER	THW Kiel		8	17	9														
(Poland) POL	Kielce		3	6	6														
(Denmark) DEN	KIF Kolding		0	2	0														
(Denmark) DEN	AG København		0	1	0														
(Germany) GER	DHfK Leipzig		1	2	0														
(Germany) GER	TBV Lemgo		0	1	0														
(Sweden) SWE	Lugi HF		0	1	0														
(Germany) GER	Magdeburg		5	9	4														
(Croatia) CRO	Medveščak Zagreb		1	1	0														
(Serbia) SRB	Metaloplastika Šabac		3	6	0														
(Belgium) BEL	SKA Minsk		3	3	0														
(France) FRA	Montpellier		2	3	0														
(Russia) RUS	MAI Moscow		2	3	0														
(France) FRA	Nantes		1	3	3														
(Norway) NOR	Oppsal Oslo		0	1	0														
(Sweden) SWE	Örebro		1	1	0														
(France) FRA	Paris Saint-Germain		1	6	6														
(Switzerland) SWI	Pfadi Winterthur		0	1	0														
(Spain) ESP	Portland San Antonio		3	6	0														
(Serbia) SRB	Proleter Zrenjanin		1	1	0														
(Slovenia) SLO	Prule 67 Ljubljana		0	1	0														
(Germany) GER	Rhein-Neckar Löwen		0	2	1														
(Sweden) SWE	Redbergslids		1	1	0														
(Denmark) DEN	IK Skovbakken		0	1	0														
(Poland) POL	Śląsk Wrocław		1	1	0														
(Slovenia) SLO	Slovan Ljubljana		1	1	0														
(Sweden) SWE	SoIK Hellas		0	1	0														
(Portugal) POR	Sporting CP Lisbon		0	1	0														
(Switzerland) SWI	TSV St. Otmar St. Gallen		1	1	0														
(Romania) ROM	Steaua București		4	7	0														
(Slovakia) SVK	Tatran Prešov		0	1	0														
(Germany) GER	TUSEM Essen		1	3	0														
(Spain) ESP	Valladolid		0	1	0														
(France) FRA	USAM Nîmes		0	1	0														
(Iceland) ISL	Valur Reykjavík		1	1	0														
(North Macedonia) NMK	Vardar Skopje		2	3	3														
(France) FRA	Vénissieux		0	1	0														
(Hungary) HUN	Veszprém		4	10	7														
(Germany) GER	Wallau-Massenheim		1	1	0														
(Austria) AUT	West Wien		0	1	0														
(Poland) POL	Wybrzeże Gdańsk		2	2	0														
(Croatia) CRO	Zagreb		6	7	0														
	[[]]		0	0	0														

== See also ==
- EHF Champions League
- Women's EHF Champions League
