= Ștefan Birtalan =

Romanian handball player (1948–2024)

István Birtalan
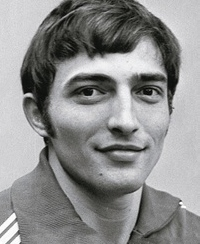
- Birtalan in the 1970s-80s

Personal information
- Nationality: Romanian
- Born: 25 September 1948 Zalău, Romania
- Died: 27 May 2024 (aged 75) Bucharest, Romania
- Height: 1.94 m (6 ft 4 in)

Sport
- Sport: Handball
- Position: Left back

Senior clubs
- Years: Team
- 1964–1966: Rapid CFR Jibou
- 1967–1970: Minerul Baia Mare
- 1970–1985: Steaua Bucharest
- 1985–1986: Tuscany Follonica
National team
Years	Team	Apps	(Gls)
1966–1982	Romania	231	(993)

Teams managed
- 1986–1994: Steaua Bucharest (assistant)
- 1993–1994: Romania
- 1994–1999: Qatar
- 1999–2002: Steaua Bucharest
Medal record
Team handball
Representing Romania
Olympic Games
Silver medal – second place	1976 Montreal	Team
Bronze medal – third place	1972 Munich	Team
Bronze medal – third place	1980 Moscow	Team
World Championship
Gold medal – first place	1970 France	Team
Gold medal – first place	1974 East Germany	Team
World University Championship
Gold medal – first place	1973	Team
Gold medal – first place	1975	Team

Ştefan Birtalan (25 September 1948 – 27 May 2024) was a Romanian handball player, coach and sports official.

Birtalan was one of the best players of his time and was named the World Player of the Year in 1974, 1976 and 1977. He spent most of his club career with Steaua București, winning with them 12 Romanian championships and the European Champions Cup in 1977. He also won the world title in 1970 and 1974, becoming the top scorer at the 1974 tournament with 43 goals. He participated in the 1972, 1976 and 1980 Olympics winning one silver and 2 bronze medals.

== Biography ==
Birtalan was of Hungarian descent through his parents István and Valeria.

As a teenager he trained in handball, volleyball, basketball and athletics. He debuted in handball aged 16 with the team Rapid CFR Jibou. In 1966, he moved to Baia Mare to study civil engineering. There he first played volleyball and in 1967 changed to handball. From 1970 to 1985 he competed for Steaua Bucharest, with an interruption between 1981 and 1983. With Steaua he won the 1977 EHF Champions League title, finishing second in 1971, and 12 national titles. In 1966, he was included to the junior and in 1968 to the senior national handball team.

At the end of his career Birtalan spent one year in Italy as player-coach in 1985–86. After returning to Romania he worked with the national junior team, and in 1991–1994 was head coach at Steaua. In 1994 he accepted a coaching position in Qatar. Between 1999 and 2002 he again coached Steaua, bringing it to the national titles in 2000 and 2001. In 2002 he retired from coaching due to health problems, and became a sport administrator.

Birtalan died on 27 May 2024, at the age of 75.

== International achievements ==
- EHF Champions League:
  - Winner: 1977
  - Finalist: 1971
- World Championship:
  - Gold Medalist: 1970, 1974
- Summer Olympics:
  - Silver Medalist: 1976
  - Bronze Medalist: 1972, 1980
- World University Championship:
  - Gold Medalist: 1973, 1975

== National achievements ==
=== Player ===
Steaua București

- Romanian National League:
  - Winner: 1971, 1972, 1973, 1974, 1975, 1976, 1977, 1979, 1980, 1981, 1984, 1985
- Romanian Cup:
  - Winner: 1981, 1985

=== Manager ===
Steaua București

- Romanian National League:
  - Winner: 1987, 1988, 1989, 1990, 2000, 2001
- Romanian Cup:
  - Winner: 1990, 2000, 2001

== Individual awards and honours ==
IHF

- 3× IHF World Player of the Year: 1974, 1976, 1977
- World Championship Top Scorer: 1974
- Summer Olympics Top Scorer: 1976

National

- 3× Romanian Sportsman of the Year: 1974, 1976, 1977
