= Hrvoje Horvat =

Croatian handball player (born 1946)

Personal information
- Full name: Hrvoje Horvat
- Nationality: Croatian
- Born: 22 May 1946 (age 80) Bjelovar, FPR Yugoslavia
- Height: 1.90 m (6 ft 3 in)

Sport
- Sport: Handball
- Position: Centre back

Youth career
- Years: Team
- 1959–1962: RK Partizan Bjelovar

Senior clubs
- Years: Team
- 1962–1979: Partizan Bjelovar
- 1979–1980: Milbertshofen
- 1980–1983: MTSV Schwabing
National team
| Years | Team | Apps | (Gls) |
| 1966–1976 | Yugoslavia | 231 | (621) |

Teams managed
- 1991–1994: VfL Gummersbach
- 1994–1997: TV Eitra
- 1997–1999: TV 08 Willstätt
- 1999–2003: MT Melsungen
- 2005–2009: HSC 2000 Coburg
- 2009–2011: RK Dubrava
- 2011–2013: HSC 2000 Coburg
Medal record
Representing Yugoslavia
Men's handball
| Gold medal – first place | 1972 Munich | Team competition |
World Championship
| Bronze medal – third place | 1970 France | Team competition |
| Bronze medal – third place | 1974 East Germany | Team competition |
Mediterranean Games
| Gold medal – first place | 1967 Tunis | Team competition |

Hrvoje Horvat (born 22 May 1946) is a Croatian handball coach and player who competed in the 1972 Summer Olympics and in the 1976 Summer Olympics for SFR Yugoslavia.

== International career ==
He was part of the Yugoslav team which won the gold medal at the Munich Games. He played all six matches and scored fifteen goals. Four years later he was a member of the Yugoslav team which finished fifth. He played all six matches and scored fifteen goals again.

== Managerial career ==
In 2005 he became coach of German team HSC 2000 Coburg and has led them up into the second league.

== Personal life ==
His nickname is Cveba, which is the Croatian word for raisin. Horvat has a son Hrvoje, who is also a handball coach, and daughters Jasenka, who was married to the late Iztok Puc, one of the best players in handball history, and Vanja, who was married to former footballer and now a manager Zoran Mamić.

== Honours ==
Player
Partizan Bjelovar

- Yugoslav First League (7): 1966–67, 1967–68, 1969–70, 1970–71, 1971–72, 1976–77, 1978–79
- European Cup
  - Winner (1): 1971–72
  - Finalist (1): 1972–73

Coach
HSC 2000 Coburg

- Regionaliga Süd (1): 2006–07

Olympic Games
| Preceded by Mirko Sandić | Flagbearer for Yugoslavia; Montreal 1976 | Succeeded by Matija Ljubek |
