= 1977–78 European Cup (handball) =

18th season of the European Cup competition

European Cup
- 1977–78

Tournament information
- Sport: Handball

Final positions
- Champions: SC Magdeburg

The 1977–78 European Cup was the 18th edition of Europe's premier club handball tournament.

== Knockout stage ==
=== Round 1 ===
Team 1	Agg.	Team 2	1st leg	2nd leg
Duina Trieste (Italy)	39–39	(Israel) Hapoel Rehovot	22–18	17–21
Partizan Bjelovar (Socialist Federal Republic of Yugoslavia)	57–40	(Bulgaria) Sportist Kremikovtzi	29–17	28–23
Os Belenenses (Portugal)	40–30	(France) Racing Club Strasbourg	24–16	16–14
Valur Reykjavík (Iceland)	53–31	(Faroe Islands) Kyndil Tórshavn	23–15	30–16
UHC Krems (Austria)	36–33	(Switzerland) Grasshoppers Zürich	19–13	17–20
IL Refstad Oslo (Norway)	41–32	(Finland) Sparta Helsinki	20–12	21–20
HB Dudelange (Luxembourg)	50–25	(United Kingdom) HC Birkenhead	34–12	16–13
Progrés HC Seraing (Belgium)	29–38	(Netherlands) HV Sittardia	15–19	14–19

=== Round 2 ===
Team 1	Agg.	Team 2	1st leg	2nd leg
SC Magdeburg (East Germany)	54–51	(Socialist Federal Republic of Yugoslavia) Partizan Bjelovar	33–23	21–28
Os Belenenses (Portugal)	41–63	(Czechoslovakia) Dukla Prague	19–30	22–33
Honvéd Budapest (Hungary)	60–45	(Iceland) Valur Reykjavík	35–23	25–22
UHC Krems (Austria)	32–46	(Germany) Grün-Weiß Dankersen	16–25	16–21
IK Hellas Stockholm (Sweden)	34–41	(Norway) IL Refstad Oslo	17–19	17–22
CB Calpisa (Spain)	47–30	(Israel) Hapoel Rehovot	31–15	16–15
HB Dudelange (Luxembourg)	37–60	(Denmark) KFUM Fredericia	19–32	18–28
HV Sittardia (Netherlands)	38–63	(Poland) Śląsk Wrocław	17–32	21–31

=== Quarterfinals ===
Team 1	Agg.	Team 2	1st leg	2nd leg
SC Magdeburg (East Germany)	47–42	(Czechoslovakia) Dukla Prague	22–22	25–20
Honvéd Budapest (Hungary)	39–38	(Germany) Grün-Weiß Dankersen	24–20	15–18
IL Refstad Oslo (Norway)	33–36	(Spain) CB Calpisa	17–17	16–19
KFUM Fredericia (Denmark)	44–46	(Poland) Śląsk Wrocław	26–20	18–26

=== Semifinals ===
Team 1	Agg.	Team 2	1st leg	2nd leg
Honvéd Budapest (Hungary)	38–41	(East Germany) SC Magdeburg	21–22	17–19
CB Calpisa (Spain)	39–52	(Poland) Śląsk Wrocław	18–20	21–32

=== Final ===
Team 1	Score	Team 2
SC Magdeburg (East Germany)	28–22	(Poland) Śląsk Wrocław
