= 1979–80 European Cup (handball) =

European men's club handball tournament

European Cup
- 1979–80

Tournament information
- Sport: Handball

Final positions
- Champions: TV Großwallstadt

The 1979–80 European Cup was the 20th edition of Europe's premier club handball tournament.

== Knockout stage ==
=== Round 1 ===
Team 1	Agg.	Team 2	1st leg	2nd leg
Pallamano Trieste 1970 (Italy)	50–40	(Israel) Hapoel Rehovot	22–20	28–20
BK46 Karis (Finland)	45–50	(Norway) Oppsal IF Oslo	26–24	19–26
HV Sittardia (Netherlands)	45–40	(Luxembourg) Fola Esch	24–15	21–25
TuS Hofweier (Germany)	52–33	(Belgium) Klub Mechelen Handball	31–12	21–21
CSKA Sofia (Bulgaria)	37–34	(Austria) ASKÖ Linz	23–15	14–19
Sporting CP (Portugal)	42–46	(Switzerland) Grasshoppers Zürich	23–23	19–23
Brentwood'72 HC (United Kingdom)	W.O.	(Faroe Islands) Kyndil Tórshavn		

=== Round 2 ===
Team 1	Agg.	Team 2	1st leg	2nd leg
TV Großwallstadt (Germany)	48–30	(Italy) Pallamano Trieste 1970	30–14	18–16
Partizan Bjelovar (Socialist Federal Republic of Yugoslavia)	44–40	(Norway) Oppsal IF Oslo	27–23	17–17
Dukla Prague (Czechoslovakia)	56–38	(Netherlands) HV Sittardia	32–20	24–18
Bányász Tatabánya (Hungary)	35–33	(Germany) TuS Hofweier	19–14	16–19
CSKA Sofia (Bulgaria)	45–48	(Denmark) KFUM Fredericia	26–19	19–29
Atlético Madrid (Spain)	49–33	(France) Stella Sports St. Maur	28–16	21–17
HK Drott Halmstad (Sweden)	53–43	(Switzerland) Grasshoppers Zürich	29–21	24–22
Brentwood'72 HC (United Kingdom)	33–70	(Iceland) Valur Reykjavík	19–32	14–38

=== Quarterfinals ===
Team 1	Agg.	Team 2	1st leg	2nd leg
Partizan Bjelovar (Socialist Federal Republic of Yugoslavia)	31–33	(Germany) TV Großwallstadt	14–12	17–21
Dukla Prague (Czechoslovakia)	41–40	(Hungary) Bányász Tatabánya	23–21	18–19
KFUM Fredericia (Denmark)	34–36	(Spain) Atlético Madrid	17–17	17–19
HK Drott Halmstad (Sweden)	34–35	(Iceland) Valur Reykjavík	18–17	16–18

=== Semifinals ===
Team 1	Agg.	Team 2	1st leg	2nd leg
Dukla Prague (Czechoslovakia)	32–34	(Germany) TV Großwallstadt	18–17	14–17
Atlético Madrid (Spain)	39–39	(Iceland) Valur Reykjavík	24–21	15–18

=== Final ===
Team 1	Score	Team 2
TV Großwallstadt (Germany)	21–12	(Iceland) Valur Reykjavík
