= 1967–68 European Cup (handball) =

European men's club handball tournament

European Cup
- 1967–68

Tournament information
- Sport: Handball

Final positions
- Champions: Steaua București

The 1967–68 European Cup was the ninth edition of Europe's premier club handball tournament.

== Knockout stage ==
=== Round 1 ===
Team 1	Agg.	Team 2	1st leg	2nd leg
SC Dynamo Berlin-Ost (East Germany)	49–46	(Denmark) HG København	29–22	20–24
VIF G.Dimitrov Sofia (Bulgaria)	22–16	(Netherlands) VC Arnheim	15–7	7–9
BM Granollers (Spain)	48–31	(Belgium) Progres HC Seraing	34–19	14–12
Śląsk Wrocław (Poland)	45–32	(Switzerland) ATV Basel	20–7	25–25
Fram Reykjavik (Iceland)	25–40	(Socialist Federal Republic of Yugoslavia) Partizan Bjelovar	16–16	9–24
Honved Budapest (Hungary)	54–36	(Sweden) Vikingaernas Helsingborg	34–18	20–18

=== Round 2 ===
Team 1	Agg.	Team 2	1st leg	2nd leg
HB Dudelange (Luxembourg)	24–66	(Romania) Steaua București	10–29	14–37
VfL Gummersbach (Germany)	37–21	(France) SMUC Marseille	18–8	19–13
Rapid Wien (Austria)	22–67	(East Germany) SC Dynamo Berlin-Ost	11–30	11–37
UK-51 Helsinki (Finland)	44–33	(Bulgaria) VIF G.Dimitrov Sofia	29–15	15–18
BM Granollers (Spain)	42–36	(Portugal) Sporting Lisbon	26–16	16–20
Śląsk Wrocław (Poland)	30–56	(Socialist Federal Republic of Yugoslavia) Partizan Bjelovar	16–24	14–32
IK Fredensborg Oslo (Norway)	38–25	(Israel) Hapoel Petah Tikva	17–16	21–9
Honved Budapest (Hungary)	34–43	(Czechoslovakia) Dukla Prague	22–18	12–25

=== Quarterfinals ===
Team 1	Agg.	Team 2	1st leg	2nd leg
Steaua București (Romania)	29–22	(Germany) VfL Gummersbach	15–9	14–13
SC Dynamo Berlin-Ost (East Germany)	59–39	(Finland) UK-51 Helsinki	29–17	30–22
Partizan Bjelovar (Socialist Federal Republic of Yugoslavia)	60–29	(Spain) BM Granollers	36–13	24–16
IK Fredensborg Oslo (Norway)	29–45	(Czechoslovakia) Dukla Prague	19–21	10–24

=== Semifinals ===
Team 1	Agg.	Team 2	1st leg	2nd leg
SC Dynamo Berlin-Ost (East Germany)	28–31	(Romania) Steaua București	16–15	12–16
Dukla Prague (Czechoslovakia)	34–33	(Socialist Federal Republic of Yugoslavia) Partizan Bjelovar	25–16	9–17

=== Finals ===
Team 1	Score	Team 2
Steaua București (Romania)	13–11	(Czechoslovakia) Dukla Prague
