= 1969–70 European Cup (handball) =

European Handball Federation's tenth tournament

European Cup
- 1969–70

Tournament information
- Sport: Handball

Final positions
- Champions: VfL Gummersbach

The 1969–70 European Cup was the tenth edition of Europe's premier club handball tournament.

== Knockout stage ==
=== Round 1 ===
Team 1	Agg.	Team 2	1st leg	2nd leg
HT Tatran Presov (Czechoslovakia)	22–24	(Germany) VfL Gummersbach	13–14	9–10
Spójnia Gdańsk (Poland)	45–35	(Finland) UK-51 Helsinki	24–18	21–17
Sporting Lisbon (Portugal)	28–39	(Netherlands) HV Sittardia	16–24	12–15
Union Salzburg (Austria)	19–47	(Socialist Federal Republic of Yugoslavia) RK Crvenka	11–22	8–25
HG København (Denmark)	42–44	(Hungary) Honved Budapest	25–16	17–28
Levski-Spartak Sofia (Bulgaria)	30–27	(Sweden) IK Hellas Stockholm	18–9	12–18

=== Round 2 ===
Team 1	Agg.	Team 2	1st leg	2nd leg
VfL Gummersbach (Germany)	50–47	(Poland) Spójnia Gdańsk	30–21	20–26
TRUD Moscow (Soviet Union)	61–31	(Netherlands) HV Sittardia	31–11	30–20
Steaua București (Romania)	54–20	(Israel) Hapoel Rehovot	32–11	22–9
Honved Budapest (Hungary)	49–34	(Iceland) FH	28–17	21–17
HB Dudelange (Luxembourg)	35–47	(Spain) FC Barcelona	20–18	15–29
SMUC Marseille (France)	24–39	(Socialist Federal Republic of Yugoslavia) RK Crvenka	10–18	14–21
Levski-Spartak Sofia (Bulgaria)	walkover	(Switzerland) Grasshoppers Zürich	w.o.	w.o.
Bergen SI (Norway)	35–49	(East Germany) SC Dynamo Berlin-Ost	20–24	15–25

=== Quarterfinals ===
Team 1	Agg.	Team 2	1st leg	2nd leg
TRUD Moscow (Soviet Union)	33–37	(Germany) VfL Gummersbach	22–17	11–20
Steaua București (Romania)	44–40	(Hungary) Honved Budapest	26–20	18–20
FC Barcelona (Spain)	30–41	(Socialist Federal Republic of Yugoslavia) RK Crvenka	18–15	12–26
SC Dynamo Berlin-Ost (East Germany)	36–18	(Switzerland) Grasshoppers Zürich	18–8	18–10

=== Semifinals ===
Team 1	Agg.	Team 2	1st leg	2nd leg
Steaua București (Romania)	24–28	(Germany) VfL Gummersbach	16–13	8–15
RK Crvenka (Socialist Federal Republic of Yugoslavia)	19–20	(East Germany) SC Dynamo Berlin-Ost	15–6	4–14

=== Finals ===
Team 1	Score	Team 2
VfL Gummersbach (Germany)	14–11	(East Germany) SC Dynamo Berlin-Ost
