= 1961–62 European Cup (handball) =

European men's club handball tournament

European Cup
- 1961–62

Tournament information
- Sport: Handball
- Administrator: IHF
- Participants: 20
- Defending champions: Frisch Auf Göppingen

Final positions
- Champions: Frisch Auf Göppingen (2nd title)
- Runner-up: Partizan Bjelovar

Tournament statistics
- Matches played: 18
- Goals scored: 629 (34.94 per match)

The 1961–62 European Cup was the fourth edition of Europe's premier club handball tournament.

== Knockout stage ==
=== Round 1 ===
Team 1	Score	Team 2
BM Granollers (Spain)	28–13	(Morocco) Stade Marocain Rabat
Śląsk Wrocław (Poland)	W.O.	(Hungary) Spartacus Budapest
NILOC Amsterdam (Netherlands)	27–10	(Luxembourg) Fola Esch
Burevestnik Kiev (Soviet Union)	26–11	(Finland) Arsenal Helsinki

=== Round of 16 ===
Team 1	Score	Team 2
Frisch Auf Göppingen (West Germany)	34–7	(Belgium) ROC Flemallois
Bataillon Joinville (France)	19–9	(Spain) BM Granollers
Dukla Prague (Czechoslovakia)	39–16	(Poland) Śląsk Wrocław
SC DHfK Leipzig (East Germany)	9–7	(Romania) Dinamo Bucuresti
Nordstrand IF (Norway)	16–22	(Denmark) AGF Aarhus
Vikingaernas Helsingborg (Sweden)	27–19	(Soviet Union) Burevestnik Kiev
BSV Bern (Switzerland)	24–17	(Netherlands) NILOC Amsterdam
Partizan Bjelovar (Socialist Federal Republic of Yugoslavia)	33–21	(Austria) ATSV Linz

=== Quarterfinals ===
Team 1	Score	Team 2
Bataillon Joinville (France)	8–11	(West Germany) Frisch Auf Goppingen
Dukla Prague (Czechoslovakia)	19–18	(East Germany) SC DHfK Leipzig
AGF Aarhus (Denmark)	21–19	(Sweden) Vikingaernas Helsingborg
BSV Bern (Switzerland)	10–18	(Socialist Federal Republic of Yugoslavia) Partizan Bjelovar

=== Semifinals ===
Team 1	Score	Team 2
Frisch Auf Göppingen (West Germany)	13–8	(Czechoslovakia) Dukla Prague
Partizan Bjelovar (Socialist Federal Republic of Yugoslavia)	14–13 (aet)	(Denmark) AGF Aarhus

=== Finals ===
Team 1	Score	Team 2
Frisch Auf Göppingen (West Germany)	13–11	(Socialist Federal Republic of Yugoslavia) Partizan Bjelovar
