= 1973–74 European Cup (handball) =

European men's club handball tournament

European Cup
- 1973–74

Tournament information
- Sport: Handball

Final positions
- Champions: VfL Gummersbach

The 1973–74 European Cup was the 14th edition of Europe's premier club handball tournament.

== Knockout stage ==
=== Round 1 ===
Team 1	Agg.	Team 2	1st leg	2nd leg
Valur Reykjavík (Iceland)	18–27	(Germany) VfL Gummersbach	10–11	8–16
FC Barcelona (Spain)	61–39	(Israel) Hapoel Herzliya	32–16	29–23
HV Sittardia (Netherlands)	29–35	(Czechoslovakia) Červená Hviezda Bratislava	18–16	11–19
Avanti Lebbeke (Belgium)	25–32	(Portugal) Sporting CP	16–16	9–16
Borac Banja Luka (Socialist Federal Republic of Yugoslavia)	36–29	(Denmark) IF Stadion Copenhagen	20–10	16–19
HB Dudelange (Luxembourg)	29–32	(France) CSL Dijon	18–17	11–15
Oppsal IF Oslo (Norway)	39–26	(Faroe Islands) Kyndil Tórshavn	18–14	21–12
Śląsk Wrocław (Poland)	32–33	(Bulgaria) Lokomotiv Sofia	23–15	9–18

=== Round 2 ===
Team 1	Agg.	Team 2	1st leg	2nd leg
FC Barcelona (Spain)	37–50	(Germany) VfL Gummersbach	22–30	15–20
SC Empor Rostock (East Germany)	33–35	(Soviet Union) CSKA Moscow	18–16	15–19
Sporting CP (Portugal)	29–48	(Czechoslovakia) Červená Hviezda Bratislava	14–31	15–17
Borac Banja Luka (Socialist Federal Republic of Yugoslavia)	49–42	(Sweden) SAAB Linköping	26–16	23–26
HC Union Krems (Austria)	30–41	(France) CSL Dijon	18–17	12–24
Oppsal IF Oslo (Norway)	30–24	(Switzerland) St. Otmar Sankt Gallen	18–10	12–14
HIFK Helsinki (Finland)	38–55	(Hungary) Honvéd Budapest	17–23	21–32
MAI Moscow (Soviet Union)	48–42	(Bulgaria) Lokomotiv Sofia	28–21	20–21

=== Quarterfinals ===
Team 1	Agg.	Team 2	1st leg	2nd leg
VfL Gummersbach (Germany)	40–33	(Soviet Union) CSKA Moscow	22–14	18–19
Červená Hviezda Bratislava (Czechoslovakia)	37–31	(Socialist Federal Republic of Yugoslavia) Borac Banja Luka	20–16	17–15
Oppsal IF Oslo (Norway)	35–29	(France) CSL Dijon	19–15	16–14
Honvéd Budapest (Hungary)	41-48	(Soviet Union) MAI Moscow	22-22	19–26

=== Semifinals ===
Team 1	Agg.	Team 2	1st leg	2nd leg
Červená Hviezda Bratislava (Czechoslovakia)	25–31	(Germany) VfL Gummersbach	15–16	10–15
Oppsal IF Oslo (Norway)	26–32	(Soviet Union) MAI Moscow	13–10	13–22

=== Final ===
Team 1	Score	Team 2
VfL Gummersbach (Germany)	19–17	(Soviet Union) MAI Moscow
