= 1971–72 European Cup (handball) =

European men's club handball tournament

European Cup
- 1971–72

Tournament information
- Sport: Handball

Final positions
- Champions: Partizan Bjelovar

The 1971–72 European Cup was the 12th edition of Europe's premier club handball tournament.

== Knockout stage ==
=== Round 1 ===
Team 1	Agg.	Team 2	1st leg	2nd leg
FH (Iceland)	33–26	(France) US d'Ivry Paris	18–12	15–14
UK-51 Helsinki (Finland)	W.O.	(Israel) Hapoel Petah Tikva	17–21	
MAI Moscow (Soviet Union)	42–37	(Poland) Grunwald Poznań	25–16	17–21
IK Hellas Stockholm (Sweden)	27–24	(Switzerland) St. Otmar St. Gallen	18–13	9–11
Oppsal IF Oslo (Norway)	36–26	(Spain) BM Granollers	20–10	16–16
HB Dudelange (Luxembourg)	23–38	(Netherlands) HV Sittardia	10–17	13–21

=== Round 2 ===
Team 1	Agg.	Team 2	1st leg	2nd leg
Partizan Bjelovar (Socialist Federal Republic of Yugoslavia)	73–20	(Italy) Genovesi Roma	43–11	30–9
FH (Iceland)	30–21	(Finland) UK-51 Helsinki	13–10	17–11
MAI Moscow (Soviet Union)	25–22	(Germany) Grün-Weiß Dankersen	12–11	13–11
Inter Herstal (Belgium)	24–54	(Sweden) IK Hellas Stockholm	15–25	9–29
Oppsal IF Oslo (Norway)	40–30	(Bulgaria) Chernomorets Burgas	25–14	15–16
VfL Gummersbach (Germany)	59–26	(Portugal) Sporting CP	38–6	21–20
Efterslægten BK Copenhagen (Denmark)	43–26	(Austria) ASK Salzburg	27–12	16–14
HV Sittardia (Netherlands)	25–34	(Czechoslovakia) Tatran Prešov	9–10	16–24

=== Quarterfinals ===
Team 1	Agg.	Team 2	1st leg	2nd leg
Partizan Bjelovar (Socialist Federal Republic of Yugoslavia)	55–22	(Iceland) FH	27–8	28–14
MAI Moscow (Soviet Union)	25–18	(Sweden) IK Hellas Stockholm	13–9	12–9
Oppsal IF Oslo (Norway)	31–32	(Germany) VfL Gummersbach	18–13	13–19
Tatran Prešov (Czechoslovakia)	42–27	(Denmark) Efterslægten BK Copenhagen	18–14	24–13

=== Semifinals ===
Team 1	Agg.	Team 2	1st leg	2nd leg
Partizan Bjelovar (Socialist Federal Republic of Yugoslavia)	32–31	(Soviet Union) MAI Moscow	21–14	11–17
VfL Gummersbach (Germany)	30–24	(Czechoslovakia) Tatran Prešov	12–5	18–19

=== Final ===
Team 1	Score	Team 2
Partizan Bjelovar (Socialist Federal Republic of Yugoslavia)	19–14	(West Germany) VfL Gummersbach
