= 1972–73 European Cup (handball) =

European men's club handball tournament

European Cup
- 1972–73

Tournament information
- Sport: Handball

Final positions
- Champions: MAI Moscow

The 1972–73 European Cup was the 13th edition of Europe's premier club handball tournament.

== Knockout stage ==
=== Round 1 ===
| Team 1 | Agg. | Team 2 | 1st leg | 2nd leg |
|---|---|---|---|---|
| Oppsal IF Oslo (Norway) | 26–25 | (Poland) Śląsk Wrocław | 16–11 | 10–14 |
| SC Leipzig (East Germany) | 38–24 | (France) Stella Sports St. Maur | 24–13 | 14–11 |
| IF Stadion Copenhagen (Denmark) | 31–28 | (Iceland) Fram Reykjavík | 15–15 | 16–13 |
| Elektromos Budapest (Hungary) | 29–40 | (Bulgaria) Lokomotiv Sofia | 13–12 | 16–28 |
| HIFK Helsinki (Finland) | 47–28 | (Faroe Islands) Kyndil Tórshavn | 25–14 | 22–14 |
| Frisch Auf Göppingen (Germany) | 68–18 | (Italy) CUS Verona | 38–6 | 30–12 |
| HB Dudelange (Luxembourg) | 26–33 | (Israel) Hapoel Ramat Gan | 16–18 | 10–15 |
| HV Sittardia (Netherlands) | 35–27 | (Spain) BM Granollers | 17–12 | 18–15 |
| HC Banik Karvina (Czechoslovakia) | 40–26 | (Portugal) Sporting CP | 24–11 | 16–15 |

=== Round 2 ===
| Team 1 | Agg. | Team 2 | 1st leg | 2nd leg |
|---|---|---|---|---|
| MAI Moscow (Soviet Union) | 50–26 | (Belgium) Avanti Lebbeke | 28–12 | 22–14 |
| Steaua București (Romania) | 34–23 | (Norway) Oppsal IF Oslo | 21–9 | 13–14 |
| SC Leipzig (East Germany) | 26–23 | (Denmark) IF Stadion Copenhagen | 15–12 | 11–11 |
| HIFK Helsinki (Finland) | 46–53 | (Bulgaria) Lokomotiv Sofia | 24–30 | 22–23 |
| Frisch Auf Göppingen (Germany) | 39–25 | (Switzerland) ATV Basel | 22–10 | 17–15 |
| Hapoel Ramat Gan (Israel) | 19–36 | (Sweden) IK Hellas Stockholm | 8–18 | 11–18 |
| HV Sittardia (Netherlands) | 30–25 | (Austria) UHC Salzburg | 11–7 | 19–18 |
| HC Banik Karvina (Czechoslovakia) | 29–32 | (Socialist Federal Republic of Yugoslavia) Partizan Bjelovar | 16–10 | 13–22 |

=== Quarterfinals ===
| Team 1 | Agg. | Team 2 | 1st leg | 2nd leg |
|---|---|---|---|---|
| MAI Moscow (Soviet Union) | 41–31 | (Romania) Steaua București | 22–14 | 19–17 |
| Lokomotiv Sofia (Bulgaria) | 25–28 | (East Germany) SC Leipzig | 14–11 | 11–17 |
| Frisch Auf Göppingen (Germany) | 32–34 | (Sweden) IK Hellas Stockholm | 19–13 | 13–21 |
| Partizan Bjelovar (Socialist Federal Republic of Yugoslavia) | 33–27 | (Netherlands) HV Sittardia | 21–14 | 12–13 |

=== Semifinals ===
| Team 1 | Agg. | Team 2 | 1st leg | 2nd leg |
|---|---|---|---|---|
| SC Leipzig (East Germany) | 23–28 | (Soviet Union) MAI Moscow | 14–11 | 9–17 |
| IK Hellas Stockholm (Sweden) | 33–36 | (Socialist Federal Republic of Yugoslavia) Partizan Bjelovar | 20–13 | 13–23 |

=== Final ===
| Team 1 | Score | Team 2 |
|---|---|---|
| MAI Moscow (Soviet Union) | 26–23 | (Socialist Federal Republic of Yugoslavia) Partizan Bjelovar |
