= Frandsen =

Frandsen is a surname of Danish origin. It may refer to:

- Aage Frandsen (1890–1968), Danish gymnast
- Anders Frandsen, Danish actor and musician
- Mikkel Frandsen (1892–1981), American physical chemist
- John Frandsen (composer), Danish composer and organist
- Jørgen Frandsen, Danish handball player
- Kevin Frandsen, American baseball player
- Per Frandsen, Danish soccer player
- Rasmus Frandsen (1886–1974), Danish rower
- Scott Frandsen, Canadian rower
- Thomas Frandsen, Danish soccer player
