= 1976–77 European Cup (handball) =

European men's club handball tournament

European Cup
- 1976–77

Tournament information
- Sport: Handball

Final positions
- Champions: Steaua București

The 1976–77 European Cup was the 17th edition of Europe's premier club handball tournament.

== Knockout stage ==
=== Round 1 ===
Team 1	Agg.	Team 2	1st leg	2nd leg
Steaua București (Romania)	76–39	(Italy) Pallamano Trieste	38–21	38–18
Dosza Debrecen (Hungary)	42–37	(Bulgaria) CSKA Sofia	23–16	19–21
Red Star Bratislava (Czechoslovakia)	46–13	(Austria) HC Oberglas Barnbach	30–9	16–4
Stella Sports St. Maur (France)	27–38	(Switzerland) Grasshoppers Zürich	12–18	15–20
FH (Iceland)	53–33	(Faroe Islands) VIF Vestmanna	28–13	25–20
HV Sittardia (Netherlands)	77–17	(United Kingdom) HC Birkenhead	38–5	39–12
Ystads IF (Sweden)	42–29	(Finland) Sparta Helsinki	25–14	17–15
CSKA Moscow (Soviet Union)	42–36	(East Germany) SC Leipzig	21–17	21–19

=== Round 2 ===
Team 1	Agg.	Team 2	1st leg	2nd leg
HB Dudelange (Luxembourg)	28–63	(Romania) Steaua București	11–28	17–35
CB Calpisa (Spain)	32–19	(Norway) Oppsal IF Oslo	14–7	18–12
Debreceni Dózsa (Hungary)	45–62	(Denmark) KFUM Fredericia	28–31	17–31
Red Star Bratislava (Czechoslovakia)	45–31	(Switzerland) Grasshoppers Zürich	25–19	20–12
FH (Iceland)	38–44	(Poland) Śląsk Wrocław	20–22	18–22
VfL Gummersbach (Germany)	42–33	(Israel) Hapoel Rehovot	25–15	17–18
HV Sittardia (Netherlands)	31–54	(Sweden) Ystads IF	17–34	14–20
Borac Banja Luka (Socialist Federal Republic of Yugoslavia)	39–47	(Soviet Union) CSKA Moscow	23–26	16–21

=== Quarterfinals ===
Team 1	Agg.	Team 2	1st leg	2nd leg
Steaua București (Romania)	40–39	(Spain) CB Calpisa	22–19	18–20
KFUM Fredericia (Denmark)	50–40	(Czechoslovakia) Red Star Bratislava	25–17	25–23
VfL Gummersbach (Germany)	39–34	(Poland) Śląsk Wrocław	16–14	23–20
CSKA Moscow (Soviet Union)	46–33	(Sweden) Ystads IF	26–19	20–14

=== Semifinals ===
Team 1	Agg.	Team 2	1st leg	2nd leg
VfL Gummersbach (Germany)	34–35	(Soviet Union) CSKA Moscow	18–20	16–15
Steaua București (Romania)	48–41	(Denmark) KFUM Fredericia	29–22	19–19

=== Final ===
Team 1	Score	Team 2
Steaua București (Romania)	21–20	(Soviet Union) CSKA Moscow
