= 1982–83 European Cup (handball) =

European men's club handball tournament

European Cup
- 1982–83

Tournament information
- Sport: Handball
- Defending champions: Budapest Honved

Final positions
- Champions: VfL Gummersbach
- Runner-up: CSKA Moscow

The 1982–83 European Cup was the 23rd edition of Europe's premier club handball tournament. Budapest Honved was the reigning champion, and VfL Gummersbach won the tournament.

== Knockout stage ==
=== Round 1 ===
Team 1	Agg.	Team 2	1st leg	2nd leg
Dukla Prague (Czechoslovakia)	51–32	(Austria) Raika Koflach	29–22	22–10
Víkingur Reykjavík (Iceland)	62–42	(Faroe Islands) VIF Vestmanna	35–19	27–23
FC Barcelona (Spain)	64–43	(Portugal) Benfica Lisboa	32–25	32–18
Hapoel Rehovot (Israel)	75–25	(United Kingdom) HB Liverpool	40–10	35–15
IK Heim (Sweden)	62–49	(Norway) Fredensborg Ski	32–23	30–26
Sporting Neerpelt (Belgium)	32–37	(Netherlands) Vlug en Lenig Geleen	20–16	12–21
Aris Athens (Greece)	45–70	(Romania) Steaua București	28–34	17–36
SC Magdeburg (East Germany)	59–42	(Italy) Cividin Trieste	29–24	30–18
HBC Schifflange (Luxembourg)	35–59	(France) USM Gagny	17–25	18–34
İstanbul Bankası Yenişehir (Turkey)	37–57	(Hungary) Veszprémi Építők SK	19–26	18–31
Sjundea IF (Finland)	46–63	(Soviet Union) CSKA Moscow	27–27	19–36

=== Round 2 ===
Team 1	Agg.	Team 2	1st leg	2nd leg
Skovbakken Aarhus (Denmark)	38–45	(Germany) VfL Gummersbach	18–21	20–24
Dukla Prague (Czechoslovakia)	41–34	(Iceland) Víkingur Reykjavík	23–15	18–19
FC Barcelona (Spain)	55–24	(Israel) Hapoel Rehovot	25–16	30–8
IK Heim (Sweden)	51–36	(Switzerland) St. Otmar St. Gallen	32–20	19–16
Honvéd Budapest (Hungary)	56–34	(Netherlands) Vlug en Lenig Geleen	30–21	26–13
Steaua București (Romania)	40–40 (4–5)	(Socialist Federal Republic of Yugoslavia) RK Metaloplastika	22–18	18–22
SC Magdeburg (East Germany)	62–43	(France) USM Gagny	33–16	29–27
CSKA Moscow (Soviet Union)	61–44	(Hungary) Veszprémi Építők SK	31–19	30–25

=== Quarterfinals ===
Team 1	Agg.	Team 2	1st leg	2nd leg
Dukla Prague (Czechoslovakia)	35–35	(Germany) VfL Gummersbach	19–18	16–17
IK Heim (Sweden)	34–46	(Spain) FC Barcelona	16–20	18–26
Honvéd Budapest (Hungary)	39–47	(Socialist Federal Republic of Yugoslavia) RK Metaloplastika	19–15	20–32
CSKA Moscow (Soviet Union)	54–49	(East Germany) SC Magdeburg	30–17	24–32

=== Semifinals ===
Team 1	Agg.	Team 2	1st leg	2nd leg
VfL Gummersbach (Germany)	44–38	(Spain) FC Barcelona	21–16	23–22
RK Metaloplastika (Socialist Federal Republic of Yugoslavia)	39–42	(Soviet Union) CSKA Moscow	23–17	16–25

=== Finals ===
Team 1	Agg.	Team 2	1st leg	2nd leg
CSKA Moscow (Soviet Union)	29–32	(Germany) VfL Gummersbach	15–19	14–13
