= 1981–82 European Cup (handball) =

European men's club handball tournament

European Champions Cup
- 1981–82

Tournament information
- Sport: Handball
- Defending champions: (East Germany) SC Magdeburg

Final positions
- Champion: (Hungary) Budapest Honvéd
- Runner-up: (Switzerland) St. Otmar St. Gallen

The 1981–82 European Champions Cup was the 22nd edition of Europe's premier club handball tournament.

== Knockout stage ==
=== Round 1 ===
Team 1	Agg.	Team 2	1st leg	2nd leg
Sporting CP (Portugal)	47–59	(France) USM Gagny	25–27	22–32
Ionikos Athens (Greece)	33–76	(Hungary) Budapest Honvéd	22–39	11–37
CSKA Sofia (Bulgaria)	64–39	(Turkey) Beşiktaş İstanbul	37–17	27–22
NCR/Blauw-Wit Neerbeek (Netherlands)	33–36	(Belgium) Sporting Neerpelt	19–21	14–15
Brentwood'72 HC (United Kingdom)	44–57	(Luxembourg) HB Dudelange	25–32	19–25
Maccabi Petah Tikva (Israel)	45–55	(Austria) ASKÖ Linz	27–28	18–27
Sjundea IF (Finland)	42–42	(Norway) Nordstrand IF	20–15	22–27
Cividin Trieste (Italy)	38–41	(Switzerland) St. Otmar St. Gallen	23–21	15–20

=== Round 2 ===
Team 1	Agg.	Team 2	1st leg	2nd leg
Budapest Honvéd (Hungary)	58–55	(France) USM Gagny	34–28	24–27
CSKA Sofia (Bulgaria)	42–43	(Sweden) Vikingaernas Helsingborg	24–21	18–22
Helsingør IF (Denmark)	45–37	(Belgium) Sporting Neerpelt	26–16	19–21
HB Dudelange (Luxembourg)	30–56	(Czechoslovakia) VSŽ Košice	15–31	15–25
Borac Banja Luka (Socialist Federal Republic of Yugoslavia)	63–44	(Austria) ASKÖ Linz	32–22	31–22
SC Magdeburg (East Germany)	30–31	(Germany) TV Großwallstadt	15–13	15–18
Víkingur Reykjavík (Iceland)	36–38	(Spain) Atlético Madrid	14–15	22–23
St. Otmar St. Gallen (Switzerland)	59–40	(Finland) Sjundea IF	28–24	31–16

=== Quarterfinals ===
Team 1	Agg.	Team 2	1st leg	2nd leg
Vikingaernas Helsingborg (Sweden)	55–67	(Hungary) Budapest Honvéd	28–27	27–40
VSŽ Košice (Czechoslovakia)	46–46	(Denmark) Helsingør IF	32–26	14–20
TV Großwallstadt (Germany)	34–31	(Socialist Federal Republic of Yugoslavia) Borac Banja Luka	19–16	15–15
Atlético Madrid (Spain)	39–40	(Switzerland) St. Otmar St. Gallen	21–18	18–22

=== Semifinals ===
Team 1	Agg.	Team 2	1st leg	2nd leg
Helsingør IF (Denmark)	44–46	(Hungary) Budapest Honvéd	23–22	21–24
St. Otmar St. Gallen (Switzerland)	34–32	(Germany) TV Großwallstadt	16–15	18–17

=== Finals ===
Team 1	Agg.	Team 2	1st leg	2nd leg
Budapest Honvéd (Hungary)	49–34	(Switzerland) St. Otmar St. Gallen	25–16	24–18
