= 1966–67 European Cup (handball) =

European men's club handball tournament

European Cup
- 1966–67

Tournament information
- Sport: Handball

Final positions
- Champions: VfL Gummersbach

The 1966–67 European Cup was the eighth edition of Europe's premier club handball tournament.

== Knockout stage ==
=== Round 1 ===
| Team 1 | Agg. | Team 2 | 1st leg | 2nd leg |
|---|---|---|---|---|
| IS Göta Helsingborg (Sweden) | 35–58 | (West Germany) VfL Gummersbach | 20–19 | 15–39 |
| CH Schaerbeek Brussels (Belgium) | 20–46 | (Netherlands) HV Sittardia | 15–25 | 5–21 |
| Medveščak Zagreb (Socialist Federal Republic of Yugoslavia) | 37–16 | (Austria) Union West Wien | 21–5 | 16–11 |
| BM Granollers (Spain) | 40–46 | (Norway) IK Fredensborg | 24–19 | 16–27 |
| FC Porto (Portugal) | 27–47 | (France) US Ivry | 19–22 | 8–25 |

=== Round 2 ===
| Team 1 | Agg. | Team 2 | 1st leg | 2nd leg |
|---|---|---|---|---|
| VfL Gummersbach (West Germany) | 59–30 | (Netherlands) HV Sittardia | 30–10 | 29–20 |
| IK Fredensborg (Norway) | 30–33 | (Socialist Federal Republic of Yugoslavia) Medveščak Zagreb | 19–14 | 11–19 |
| Trud Moscow (Soviet Union) | 53–31 | (Finland) UK-51 Helsinki | 30–17 | 23–14 |
| Budapest Honvéd (Hungary) | 34–32 | (Iceland) FH | 20–13 | 14–19 |
| US Ivry (France) | 30–40 | (Denmark) HG | 14–20 | 16–20 |
| Dinamo București (Romania) | 39–27 | (Poland) Wybrzeże Gdańsk | 23–13 | 16–14 |
| SC DHfK Leipzig (East Germany) | 47–23 | (Switzerland) Grasshopper Club Zürich | 20–13 | 27–10 |
| ABC Dudelange (Luxembourg) | 22–61 | (Czechoslovakia) Dukla Prague | 13–28 | 9-33 |

=== Quarterfinals ===
| Team 1 | Agg. | Team 2 | 1st leg | 2nd leg |
|---|---|---|---|---|
| Medveščak Zagreb (Socialist Federal Republic of Yugoslavia) | 23–28 | (West Germany) VfL Gummersbach | 13–9 | 10–19 |
| Trud Moscow (Soviet Union) | 36–32 | (Hungary) Budapest Honvéd | 15–13 | 21–19 |
| Dinamo București (Romania) | 40–37 | (Denmark) HG Copenhagen | 24–16 | 16–21 |
| Dukla Prague (Czechoslovakia) | 30–24 | (East Germany) SC DHfK Leipzig | 21–10 | 9–14 |

=== Semifinals ===
| Team 1 | Agg. | Team 2 | 1st leg | 2nd leg |
|---|---|---|---|---|
| VfL Gummersbach (West Germany) | 32–26 | (Soviet Union) Trud Moscow | 15–11 | 17–15 |
| Dukla Prague (Czechoslovakia) | 25–17 | (Romania) Dinamo București | 10–7 | 15–10 |

=== Finals ===
| Team 1 | Score | Team 2 |
|---|---|---|
| VfL Gummersbach (Germany) | 17–13 | (Czechoslovakia) Dukla Prague |
