= 1978–79 European Cup (handball) =

European men's club handball tournament

European Cup
- 1978–79

Tournament information
- Sport: Handball

Final positions
- Champions: TV Großwallstadt

The 1978–79 European Cup was the 19th edition of Europe's premier club handball tournament.

== Knockout stage ==
=== Round 1 ===
Team 1	Agg.	Team 2	1st leg	2nd leg
Volani Rovereto (Italy)	27–42	(Austria) ASKÖ Linz	11–10	16–32
Hermes Den Haag (Netherlands)	36–42	(Belgium) Sporting Neerpelt	18–16	18–26
Željezničar Sarajevo (Socialist Federal Republic of Yugoslavia)	60–37	(Israel) Hapoel Petah Tikva	30–16	30–21
TV Zofingen (Switzerland)	32–41	(Czechoslovakia) VSŽ Košice	14–16	18–25
Sporting CP (Portugal)	30–40	(France) Stella Sports St. Maur	18–18	12–22
HK Drott Halmstad (Sweden)	61–27	(Faroe Islands) Neistin Tórshavn	31–13	30–14
IL Refstad Oslo (Norway)	28–28	(Iceland) Valur Reykjavík	16–14	12–14
CSKA Sofia (Bulgaria)	35–54	(Romania) Dinamo București	17–23	18–31
CSKA Moscow (Soviet Union)	70–33	(Finland) Kronohagens IF	35–19	35–14
Kirkby HC Liverpool (United Kingdom)	26–48	(Luxembourg) Fola Esch	14–24	12–24

=== Round 2 ===
Team 1	Agg.	Team 2	1st leg	2nd leg
TV Großwallstadt (Germany)	28–26	(Austria) ASKÖ Linz	14–11	14–15
VSŽ Košice (Czechoslovakia)	42–31	(Belgium) Sporting Neerpelt	23–13	19–18
Željezničar Sarajevo (Socialist Federal Republic of Yugoslavia)	43–44	(Hungary) Honvéd Budapest	26–22	17–22
Stella Sports St. Maur (France)	35–34	(Sweden) HK Drott Halmstad	20–16	15–18
CB Calpisa (Spain)	35–32	(Denmark) KFUM Fredericia	16–12	19–20
Valur Reykjavík (Iceland)	39–45	(Romania) Dinamo București	19–25	20–20
CSKA Moscow (Soviet Union)	59–49	(Poland) Śląsk Wrocław	35–23	24–26
Fola Esch (Luxembourg)	24–51	(East Germany) SC Empor Rostock	10–25	14–26

=== Quarterfinals ===
Team 1	Agg.	Team 2	1st leg	2nd leg
TV Großwallstadt (Germany)	34–27	(Czechoslovakia) VSŽ Košice	17–12	17–15
Stella Sports St. Maur (France)	39–51	(Hungary) Honvéd Budapest	19–25	20–26
Dinamo București (Romania)	48–38	(Spain) CB Calpisa	28–14	20–24
CSKA Moscow (Soviet Union)	36–37	(East Germany) SC Empor Rostock	22–20	14–17

=== Semifinals ===
Team 1	Agg.	Team 2	1st leg	2nd leg
TV Großwallstadt (Germany)	42–36	(Hungary) Honvéd Budapest	18–9	24–27
SC Empor Rostock (East Germany)	37–36	(Romania) Dinamo București	19–14	18–22

=== Finals ===
Team 1	Agg.	Team 2	1st leg	2nd leg
TV Großwallstadt (Germany)	30–28	(East Germany) SC Empor Rostock	14–10	16–18
