= Svend Lund =

Danish handball player (born 1949)

Svend Otto Lund (born 1 April 1949) is a Danish former handball player who competed in the 1972 Summer Olympics.

He played his club handball with IF Stadion. He debuted for the Danish national team in November 1972 against Finland. In 1972 he was part of the Danish team which finished thirteenth in the Olympic tournament. He played three matches and scored one goal.

In total he would play 18 national team matches, scoring 21 goals over a 15 month period.
