= 1970–71 European Cup (handball) =

European men's club handball tournament

European Cup
- 1970–71

Tournament information
- Sport: Handball

Final positions
- Champions: VfL Gummersbach

The 1970–71 European Cup was the 11th edition of Europe's premier club handball tournament.

== Knockout stage ==
=== Round 1 ===
Team 1	Agg.	Team 2	1st leg	2nd leg
Spójnia Gdańsk (Poland)	37–44	(Germany) Frisch Auf Göppingen	21–20	16–24
BM Granollers (Spain)	51–22	(Belgium) ROC Flemallois	28–11	23–11
Fram Reykjavík (Iceland)	32–39	(France) US d'Ivry Paris	16–15	16–24
Union Edelweiss Linz (Austria)	21–57	(Soviet Union) MAI Moscow	11–26	10–31
Buscaglione Roma (Italy)	16–72	(Netherlands) HV Sittardia	10–24	6–48
Grasshoppers Zürich (Switzerland)	27–37	(East Germany) SC Magdeburg	16–17	11–20
VIF G. Dimitrov Sofia (Bulgaria)	29–28	(Luxembourg) HB Dudelange	20–15	9–13
IK Hellas Stockholm (Sweden)	28–26	(Hungary) Elektromos Budapest	15–9	13–17
UK-51 Helsinki (Finland)	31–36	(Norway) Oslo SI	20–18	11–18

=== Round 2 ===
Team 1	Agg.	Team 2	1st leg	2nd leg
VfL Gummersbach (Germany)	33–24	(Germany) Frisch Auf Göppingen	20–12	13–12
BM Granollers (Spain)	38–34	(France) US d'Ivry Paris	24–22	14–12
MAI Moscow (Soviet Union)	W.O.	(Portugal) Sporting CP		
Dukla Prague (Czechoslovakia)	39–29	(Denmark) HG København	20–13	19–16
HV Sittardia (Netherlands)	42–63	(East Germany) SC Magdeburg	21–30	21–33
Hapoel Ramat Gan (Israel)	19–58	(Socialist Federal Republic of Yugoslavia) Partizan Bjelovar	11–27	8–31
VIF G. Dimitrov Sofia (Bulgaria)	21–31	(Sweden) IK Hellas Stockholm	10–16	11–15
Steaua București (Romania)	55–29	(Norway) Oslo SI	30–14	25–15

=== Quarterfinals ===
Team 1	Agg.	Team 2	1st leg	2nd leg
VfL Gummersbach (Germany)	41–26	(Spain) BM Granollers	25–14	16–12
Sporting CP (Portugal)	W.O.	(Czechoslovakia) Dukla Prague		
SC Magdeburg (East Germany)	27–29	(Socialist Federal Republic of Yugoslavia) Partizan Bjelovar	18–15	9–14
IK Hellas Stockholm (Sweden)	22–29	(Romania) Steaua București	12–11	10–18

=== Semifinals ===
Team 1	Agg.	Team 2	1st leg	2nd leg
Sporting CP (Portugal)	28–50	(Germany) VfL Gummersbach	17–25	11–25
Partizan Bjelovar (Socialist Federal Republic of Yugoslavia)	27–31	(Romania) Steaua București	18–14	9–17

=== Finals ===
Team 1	Score	Team 2
VFL Gummersbach (Germany)	17–16	(Romania) Steaua București
