= 1980–81 European Cup (handball) =

Handball Champions League season

European Cup
- 1980–81

Tournament information
- Sport: Handball

Final positions
- Champions: SC Magdeburg

The 1980–81 European Cup was the 21st edition of Europe's premier club handball tournament.

== Knockout stage ==
=== Round 1 ===
f

Team 1	Agg.	Team 2	1st leg	2nd leg
SC Magdeburg (East Germany)	65–39	(Austria) ASKÖ Linz	35–18	30–21
VfL Gummersbach (Germany)	42–29	(Netherlands) NCR/Blauw-Wit Neerbeek	25–13	17–16
HB Dudelange (Luxembourg)	34–37	(Belgium) Sporting Neerpelt	24–16	10–21
Kristiansand IF (Norway)	35–42	(Sweden) Lugi HF	18–18	17–24
VIF Vestmanna (Faroe Islands)	54–45	(United Kingdom) Brentwood'72 HC	30–23	24–22
Bányász Tatabánya (Hungary)	90–44	(Turkey) Beşiktaş İstanbul	49–16	41–28
BSV Bern (Switzerland)	46–33	(Portugal) Sporting CP	26–12	20–21
Volani Rovereto (Italy)	W.O.	(France) Stella Sports St. Maur		
Hutnik Kraków (Poland)	48–52	(Soviet Union) CSKA Moscow	26–26	22–26
BK46 Karis (Finland)	30–62	(Denmark) KFUM Aarhus	18–25	12–37
Steaua București (Romania)	62–27	(Israel) Maccabi Petah Tikva	34–17	28–10
RD Slovan (Socialist Federal Republic of Yugoslavia)	48–36	(Bulgaria) VIF G. Dimitrov Sofia	30–16	18–20

=== Round 2 ===
Team 1	Agg.	Team 2	1st leg	2nd leg
SC Magdeburg (East Germany)	35–28	(Germany) VfL Gummersbach	19–12	16–16
Dukla Prague (Czechoslovakia)	49–30	(Belgium) Sporting Neerpelt	29–16	20–14
Lugi HF (Sweden)	69–40	(Faroe Islands) VIF Vestmanna	30–19	39–21
Víkingur Reykjavík (Iceland)	43–43	(Hungary) Bányász Tatabánya	21–20	22–23
TV Großwallstadt (Germany)	43–30	(Switzerland) BSV Bern	22–9	21–21
Stella Sports St. Maur (France)	39–53	(Soviet Union) CSKA Moscow	19–24	20–29
FC Barcelona (Spain)	44–34	(Denmark) KFUM Aarhus	26–16	18–18
Steaua București (Romania)	39–40	(Socialist Federal Republic of Yugoslavia) RD Slovan	20–18	19–22

=== Quarterfinals ===
Team 1	Agg.	Team 2	1st leg	2nd leg
Dukla Prague (Czechoslovakia)	37–42	(East Germany) SC Magdeburg	17–19	20–23
Víkingur Reykjavík (Iceland)	33–34	(Sweden) Lugi HF	16–17	17–17
CSKA Moscow (Soviet Union)	45–35	(Germany) TV Großwallstadt	21–15	24–20
FC Barcelona (Spain)	38–52	(Socialist Federal Republic of Yugoslavia) RD Slovan	20–21	18–31

=== Semifinals ===
Team 1	Agg.	Team 2	1st leg	2nd leg
SC Magdeburg (East Germany)	46–38	(Sweden) Lugi HF	20–18	26–20
CSKA Moscow (Soviet Union)	47–50	(Socialist Federal Republic of Yugoslavia) RD Slovan	25–21	22–29

=== Finals ===
Team 1	Agg.	Team 2	1st leg	2nd leg
SC Magdeburg (East Germany)	52–43	(Socialist Federal Republic of Yugoslavia) RD Slovan	23–25	29–18
