= 1974–75 European Cup (handball) =

European men's club handball tournament

European Cup
- 1974–75

Tournament information
- Sport: Handball

Final positions
- Champions: ASK Vorwärts Frankfurt/Oder

The 1974–75 European Cup was the 15th edition of Europe's premier club handball tournament.

== Knockout stage ==
=== Round 1 ===
Team 1	Agg.	Team 2	1st leg	2nd leg
Śląsk Wrocław (Poland)	27–34	(East Germany) ASK Vorwärts Frankfurt/Oder	12–18	15–16
Fola Esch (Luxembourg)	22–28	(Belgium) KV Sasja Antwerpen	11–16	11–12
SAAB Linköping (Sweden)	36–37	(Iceland) FH	22–21	14–16
Os Belenenses (Portugal)	41–42	(Switzerland) St. Otmar St. Gallen	23–16	18–26
CSI Rosmini Roveretto (Italy)	28–40	(Spain) BM Granollers	13–15	15–25
Steaua București (Romania)	51–27	(Israel) Hapoel Raanana	27–12	24–15
HC Brentwood (United Kingdom)	18–81	(Netherlands) HV Sittardia	10–38	8–43
KFUM Aarhus (Denmark)	61–30	(Faroe Islands) Kyndil Tórshavn	34–13	27–17
Lokomotiv Sofia (Bulgaria)	46–39	(Austria) HC Oberglas Barnbach	28–17	18–22

=== Round 2 ===
Team 1	Agg.	Team 2	1st leg	2nd leg
KV Sasja Antwerpen (Belgium)	18–61	(East Germany) ASK Vorwärts Frankfurt/Oder	19–25	9–36
FH (Iceland)	42–37	(Switzerland) St. Otmar Sankt Gallen	19–14	23–23
Paris Université Club (France)	40–48	(Germany) VfL Gummersbach	20–23	20–25
Spartacus Budapest (Hungary)	51–39	(Spain) BM Granollers	28–17	23–22
TJ Skoda Plzeň (Czechoslovakia)	41–32	(Norway) IL Refstad Oslo	21–16	20–16
Steaua București (Romania)	44–43	(Soviet Union) MAI Moscow	24–22	20–21
HV Sittardia (Netherlands)	26–38	(Denmark) KFUM Aarhus	17–20	9–18
Lokomotiv Sofia (Bulgaria)	45–49	(Socialist Federal Republic of Yugoslavia) Borac Banja Luka	21–20	24–29

=== Quarterfinals ===
Team 1	Agg.	Team 2	1st leg	2nd leg
FH (Iceland)	35–51	(East Germany) ASK Vorwärts Frankfurt/Oder	17–21	18–30
VfL Gummersbach (Germany)	34–28	(Hungary) Spartacus Budapest	15–15	19–13
Steaua București (Romania)	36–23	(Czechoslovakia) TJ Skoda Plzeň	20–7	16–16
KFUM Aarhus (Denmark)	31–32	(Socialist Federal Republic of Yugoslavia) Borac Banja Luka	13–11	18–21

=== Semifinals ===
Team 1	Agg.	Team 2	1st leg	2nd leg
ASK Vorwärts Frankfurt/Oder (East Germany)	38–36	(Germany) VfL Gummersbach	22–18	16–18
Borac Banja Luka (Socialist Federal Republic of Yugoslavia)	30–30	(Romania) Steaua București	19–17	11–13

=== Final ===
Team 1	Score	Team 2
ASK Vorwärts Frankfurt/Oder (East Germany)	19–17	(Socialist Federal Republic of Yugoslavia) Borac Banja Luka
