= 1987–88 European Cup (handball) =

European men's club handball tournament

European Cup
- 1987–88

Tournament information
- Sport: Handball
- Dates: 28 September 1987–23 may 1988
- Administrator: IHF
- Participants: 29

Final positions
- Champions: (Soviet Union) CSKA Moscow
- Runner-up: (Germany) TUSEM Essen

The 1987–88 European Cup was the 28th edition of Europe's premier club handball tournament. CSKA Moscow won the tournament, beating TUSEM Essen in the final.

== Knockout stage ==
=== Round 1 ===
Team 1	Agg.	Team 2	1st leg	2nd leg
VÁÉV Bramac Veszprém (Hungary)	55–51	(Israel) Maccabi Rishon LeZion	32–24	23–27
Víkingur Reykjavík (Iceland)	67–22	(United Kingdom) HB Liverpool	29–13	38–9
Stavanger IF (Norway)	33–50	(Denmark) KIF Kolding	16–25	17–25
Ortigia Siracusa (Italy)	45–46	(Turkey) Bankası Ankara	26–18	19–28
Wagner Biro Graz (Austria)	28–54	(Czechoslovakia) Dukla Prague	15–29	13–25
Amicitia Zürich (Switzerland)	42–36	(Portugal) ABC Braga	26–14	16–22
IKN Larnaca (Cyprus)	41–84	(Greece) Ionikos Athens	23–42	18–42
HV Sittardia (Netherlands)	29–38	(Belgium) Sporting Neerpelt	19–20	10–18
USM Gagny (France)	35–40	(Spain) Elgorriaga Bidasoa Irun	21–21	14–19
Redbergslids IK (Sweden)	62–42	(Finland) BK46 Karis	30–21	32–21
Steaua București (Romania)	48–43	(Bulgaria) CSKA Sofia	26–22	22–21
Fola Esch (Luxembourg)	22–59	(East Germany) SC Empor Rostock	11–29	11–30
VIF Vestmanna (Faroe Islands)	17–28	(Germany) TUSEM Essen		17–28

=== Round 2 ===
Team 1	Agg.	Team 2	1st leg	2nd leg
CSKA Moscow (Soviet Union)	46–36	(Hungary) VÁÉV Bramac Veszprém	24–14	22–22
Víkingur Reykjavík (Iceland)	44–37	(Denmark) KIF Kolding	19–16	25–21
Bankası Ankara (Turkey)	44–65	(Socialist Federal Republic of Yugoslavia) RK Metaloplastika	25–28	19–37
Amicitia Zürich (Switzerland)	37–39	(Czechoslovakia) Dukla Prague	21–19	16–20
Wybrzeże Gdańsk (Poland)	57–31	(Greece) Ionikos Athens	30–15	27–16
Elgorriaga Bidasoa Irun (Spain)	33–31	(Belgium) Sporting Neerpelt	15–14	18–17
Redbergslids IK (Sweden)	51–53	(Romania) Steaua București	30–25	21–28
SC Empor Rostock (East Germany)	38–40	(Germany) TUSEM Essen	22–19	16–21

=== Quarterfinals ===
Team 1	Agg.	Team 2	1st leg	2nd leg
Víkingur Reykjavík (Iceland)	39–49	(Soviet Union) CSKA Moscow	19–24	20–25
RK Metaloplastika (Socialist Federal Republic of Yugoslavia)	51–44	(Czechoslovakia) Dukla Prague	25–22	26–22
Wybrzeże Gdańsk (Poland)	33–38	(Spain) Elgorriaga Bidasoa Irun	19–19	14–19
TUSEM Essen (Germany)	40–35	(Romania) Steaua București	16–11	24–24

=== Semifinals ===
Team 1	Agg.	Team 2	1st leg	2nd leg
RK Metaloplastika (Socialist Federal Republic of Yugoslavia)	40–40	(Soviet Union) CSKA Moscow	24–24	16–16
TUSEM Essen (Germany)	34–26	(Spain) Elgorriaga Bidasoa Irun	22–7	12–19

=== Finals ===
Team 1	Agg.	Team 2	1st leg	2nd leg
CSKA Moscow (Soviet Union)	36–36	(Germany) TUSEM Essen	18–15	18–21
