= 1997–98 EHF Champions League =

European handball tournament

EHF Champions League
- 1997–98

Tournament information
- Sport: Handball
- Dates: 13 September 1997–25 April 1998
- Administrator: EHF
- Participants: 35

Final positions
- Champions: FC Barcelona

Tournament statistics
- Top scorer: (Hungary) József Éles (84)

The 1997–98 EHF Champions League was the 38th edition of Europe's premier club handball tournament. FC Barcelona won their 4th title and 3rd in a row, beating Croatian Badel 1862 Zagreb in the final.

== Group stage ==
=== Group A ===
| Team | Pld | W | D | L | GF | GA | GD | Pts |
|---|---|---|---|---|---|---|---|---|
| (Slovenia) Celje Pivovarna Lasko | 6 | 5 | 0 | 1 | 162 | 133 | +29 | 10 |
| (Croatia) Badel 1862 Zagreb | 6 | 4 | 0 | 2 | 158 | 141 | +17 | 8 |
| (Italy) Generali Trieste | 6 | 2 | 0 | 4 | 141 | 149 | −8 | 4 |
| (Iceland) KA Akureyri | 6 | 1 | 0 | 5 | 132 | 170 | −38 | 2 |

=== Group B ===
| Team | Pld | W | D | L | GF | GA | GD | Pts |
|---|---|---|---|---|---|---|---|---|
| (Switzerland) Pfadi Winterthur | 6 | 4 | 1 | 1 | 168 | 147 | +21 | 9 |
| (Spain) Ademar León | 6 | 4 | 1 | 1 | 191 | 157 | +34 | 9 |
| (Socialist Federal Republic of Yugoslavia) HC Red Star | 6 | 2 | 0 | 4 | 164 | 180 | −16 | 4 |
| (Norway) Drammen HK | 6 | 1 | 0 | 5 | 138 | 177 | −39 | 2 |

=== Group C ===
| Team | Pld | W | D | L | GF | GA | GD | Pts |
|---|---|---|---|---|---|---|---|---|
| (Spain) FC Barcelona | 6 | 5 | 1 | 0 | 179 | 128 | +51 | 11 |
| (Portugal) ABC Braga | 6 | 3 | 1 | 2 | 139 | 140 | −1 | 7 |
| (Israel) Hapoel Rishon Le Zion | 6 | 3 | 0 | 3 | 142 | 166 | −24 | 6 |
| (Denmark) Virum-Sorgenfri HK | 6 | 0 | 0 | 6 | 135 | 161 | −26 | 0 |

=== Group D ===
| Team | Pld | W | D | L | GF | GA | GD | Pts |
|---|---|---|---|---|---|---|---|---|
| (Germany) TBV Lemgo | 6 | 4 | 1 | 1 | 164 | 145 | +19 | 9 |
| (Hungary) Fotex KC Veszprém | 6 | 4 | 1 | 1 | 168 | 144 | +24 | 9 |
| (North Macedonia) Jafa Promet Resen | 6 | 2 | 0 | 4 | 159 | 168 | −9 | 4 |
| (Czech Republic) CS Cabot Zubri | 6 | 1 | 0 | 5 | 148 | 182 | −34 | 2 |

== Knockout stage ==
=== Quarterfinals ===
| Team 1 | Agg. | Team 2 | 1st leg | 2nd leg |
|---|---|---|---|---|
| Ademar León (Spain) | 50–61 | (Slovenia) Celje Pivovarna Lasko | 24–26 | 26–35 |
| Badel 1862 Zagreb (Croatia) | 51–45 | (Switzerland) Pfadi Winterthur | 27–24 | 24–21 |
| Fotex KC Veszprém (Hungary) | 60–60 | (Spain) FC Barcelona | 33–28 | 27–32 |
| ABC Braga (Portugal) | 51–55 | (Germany) TBV Lemgo | 25–29 | 26–26 |

=== Semifinals ===
| Team 1 | Agg. | Team 2 | 1st leg | 2nd leg |
|---|---|---|---|---|
| FC Barcelona (Spain) | 63–56 | (Germany) TBV Lemgo | 31–22 | 32–34 |
| Badel 1862 Zagreb (Croatia) | 51–45 | (Slovenia) Celje Pivovarna Lasko | 27–20 | 24–25 |

=== Finals ===
| Team 1 | Agg. | Team 2 | 1st leg | 2nd leg |
|---|---|---|---|---|
| FC Barcelona (Spain) | 56–40 | (Croatia) Badel 1862 Zagreb | 28–18 | 28–22 |
