= 1986–87 European Cup (handball) =

European men's club handball tournament

European Cup
- 1986–87

Tournament information
- Sport: Handball
- Administrator: IHF
- Defending champions: RK Metaloplastika

Final positions
- Champions: SKA Minsk
- Runner-up: Wybrzeże Gdańsk

The 1986–87 European Cup was the 27th edition of Europe's premier club handball tournament.

== Knockout stage ==
=== Round 1 ===
Team 1	Agg.	Team 2	1st leg	2nd leg
BK46 Karis (Finland)	58–74	(Soviet Union) SKA Minsk	29–31	29–43
Crvena Zvezda (Socialist Federal Republic of Yugoslavia)	48–40	(Greece) Filippos Veria H.C.	28–18	20–22
TUSEM Essen (Germany)	62–29	(Luxembourg) HB Dudelange	24–13	38–16
USM Gagny (France)	42–26	(Belgium) Initia Hasselt	21–13	21–13
UHC Stockerau (Austria)	44–61	(Czechoslovakia) Dukla Prague	22–30	22–31
Stavanger IF (Norway)	86–31	(United Kingdom) Kirkby HC Liverpool	41–13	45–18
VIF G. Dimitrov Sofia (Bulgaria)	34–38	(Hungary) Veszprémi Építők SK	21–13	13–25
Vlug en Lenig Geleen (Netherlands)	36–43	(Switzerland) St. Otmar St. Gallen	15–23	21–20
VIF Vestmanna (Faroe Islands)	48–51	(Iceland) Víkingur Reykjavík	26–26	22–25
Maccabi Rishon LeZion (Israel)	39–42	(Italy) Cividin Trieste	22–15	17–27

=== Round 2 ===
Team 1	Agg.	Team 2	1st leg	2nd leg
SKA Minsk (Soviet Union)	62–42	(Sweden) Redbergslids IK	26–21	36–21
Hellerup IK (Denmark)	49–52	(Socialist Federal Republic of Yugoslavia) Crvena Zvezda	28–24	21–28
TUSEM Essen (Germany)	38–30	(France) USM Gagny	21–12	17–18
Dukla Prague (Czechoslovakia)	46–40	(Norway) Stavanger IF	29–18	17–22
FC Barcelona (Spain)	52–55	(Socialist Federal Republic of Yugoslavia) RK Metaloplastika	31–25	21–30
SC Empor Rostock (East Germany)	56–43	(Hungary) Veszprémi Építők SK	30–20	26–23
Víkingur Reykjavík (Iceland)	41–37	(Switzerland) St. Otmar St. Gallen	22–17	19–20
Wybrzeże Gdańsk (Poland)	W.O.	(Italy) Cividin Trieste		

=== Quarterfinals ===
Team 1	Agg.	Team 2	1st leg	2nd leg
SKA Minsk (Soviet Union)	65–50	(Socialist Federal Republic of Yugoslavia) Crvena Zvezda	33–19	32–31
TUSEM Essen (Germany)	36–35	(Czechoslovakia) Dukla Prague	19–15	17–20
SC Empor Rostock (East Germany)	44–54	(Socialist Federal Republic of Yugoslavia) RK Metaloplastika	24–29	20–25
Víkingur Reykjavík (Iceland)	42–48	(Poland) Wybrzeże Gdańsk	25–25	17–23

=== Semifinals ===
Team 1	Agg.	Team 2	1st leg	2nd leg
TUSEM Essen (Germany)	47–48	(Soviet Union) SKA Minsk	23–23	24–25
RK Metaloplastika (Socialist Federal Republic of Yugoslavia)	52–57	(Poland) Wybrzeże Gdańsk	26–33	26–24

=== Finals ===
Team 1	Agg.	Team 2	1st leg	2nd leg
SKA Minsk (Soviet Union)	62–49	(Poland) Wybrzeże Gdańsk	32–24	30–25
