= 1965–66 European Cup (handball) =

European men's club handball tournament

European Cup
- 1965–66

Tournament information
- Sport: Handball

Final positions
- Champions: SC DHfK Leipzig

The 1965–66 European Cup was the seventh edition of Europe's premier club handball tournament.

== Knockout stage ==
=== Round 1 ===
Team 1	Agg.	Team 2	1st leg	2nd leg
Budapest Honvéd (Hungary)	52–31	(Bulgaria) VIF Dimitrov Sofia	32–15	20–16
SK Rapid Wien (Austria)	31–25	(Belgium) ROC Flemallois	16–10	15–15
Operatie '55 Den Haag (Netherlands)	36–32	(Portugal) FC Porto	19–10	17–22

=== Round 2 ===
Team 1	Agg.	Team 2	1st leg	2nd leg
HB Dudelange (Luxembourg)	32–65	(East Germany) SC DHfK Leipzig	23–38	9–27
RK Zagreb (Socialist Federal Republic of Yugoslavia)	47–31	(France) SMUC Marseille	30–16	17–15
Frisch Auf Göppingen (West Germany)	17–32	(Czechoslovakia) Dukla Prague	7–11	10–21
FH (Iceland)	35–28	(Norway) IK Fredensborg	19–15	16–13
Redbergslids IK (Sweden)	41–35	(Netherlands) Operatie '55 Den Haag	20–14	21–21
Śląsk Wrocław (Poland)	38–41	(Denmark) KFUM Aarhus	20–14	18–27
Grasshopper Club Zürich (Switzerland)	35–23	(Austria) SK Rapid Wien	20–12	15–11
Atlético Madrid (Spain)	31–45	(Hungary) Budapest Honvéd	16–17	15–28

=== Quarterfinals ===
Team 1	Agg.	Team 2	1st leg	2nd leg
RK Zagreb (Socialist Federal Republic of Yugoslavia)	29–35	(East Germany) SC DHfK Leipzig	14–18	15–17
FH (Iceland)	31–43	(Czechoslovakia) Dukla Prague	15–20	16–23
KFUM Aarhus (Denmark)	50–34	(Sweden) Redbergslids IK	24–18	26–16
Budapest Honvéd (Hungary)	44–28	(Switzerland) Grasshopper Club Zürich	22–15	22–13

=== Semifinals ===
Team 1	Agg.	Team 2	1st leg	2nd leg
SC DHfK Leipzig (East Germany)	28–22	(Czechoslovakia) Dukla Prague	15–10	13–12
Budapest Honvéd (Hungary)	41–37	(Denmark) KFUM Aarhus	25–12	16–25

=== Finals ===
Team 1	Score	Team 2
SC DHfK Leipzig (East Germany)	16–14	(Hungary) Budapest Honvéd
