= 1999–2000 EHF Champions League =

European handball tournament

EHF Champions League
- 1999–2000

Tournament information
- Sport: Handball
- Dates: 27 August 1999–29 April 2000
- Administrator: EHF
- Participants: 34

Final positions
- Champions: FC Barcelona

Tournament statistics
- Top scorer: (Croatia) Zlatko Saračević (92 goals)

The 1999–2000 EHF Champions League was the 40th edition of Europe's premier club handball tournament. FC Barcelona won their 6th title and 5th in a row.

== Group stage ==
=== Group A ===
Team	Pld	W	D	L	GF	GA	GD	Pts
(Germany) THW Kiel	6	4	1	1	172	138	+34	9
(Spain) Ademar León	6	3	0	3	165	156	+9	6
(France) Montpellier HB	6	3	0	3	139	148	−9	6
(Norway) Sandefjord TIF	6	1	1	4	130	164	−34	3

=== Group B ===
Team	Pld	W	D	L	GF	GA	GD	Pts
(Slovenia) Celje Pivovarna Lasko	6	5	0	1	188	141	+47	10
(Israel) Hapoel Rishon Le Zion	6	4	0	2	157	147	+10	8
(Poland) Iskra Kielce	6	3	0	3	173	186	−13	6
(Italy) H.C. Alpi Prato	6	0	0	6	137	181	−44	0

=== Group C ===
Team	Pld	W	D	L	GF	GA	GD	Pts
(Croatia) Badel 1862 Zagreb	6	5	1	0	162	132	+30	11
(Ukraine) ZTR Zaporozhye	6	3	1	2	136	129	+7	7
(Switzerland) TV Suhr	6	2	0	4	145	166	−21	4
(Denmark) Skjern Håndbold	6	1	0	5	134	150	−16	2

=== Group D ===
Team	Pld	W	D	L	GF	GA	GD	Pts
(Spain) FC Barcelona	6	6	0	0	183	129	+54	12
(Hungary) Fotex KC Veszprém	6	3	0	3	150	147	+3	6
(Russia) HC Kaustik Volgograd	6	2	0	4	139	162	−23	4
(Federal Republic of Yugoslavia) Partizan Beograd	6	1	0	5	130	164	−34	2

== Knockout stage ==
=== Quarterfinals ===
Team 1	Agg.	Team 2	1st leg	2nd leg
Rishon Le Zion (Israel)	48–50	(Germany) THW Kiel	26–24	22–26
Ademar León (Spain)	50–54	(Slovenia) RK Celje	30–28	20–26
KC Veszprém (Hungary)	53–55	(Croatia) Badel 1862 Zagreb	27–25	26–30
ZTR Zaporozhye (Ukraine)	38–49	(Spain) FC Barcelona	17–23	21–26

=== Semifinals ===
Team 1	Agg.	Team 2	1st leg	2nd leg
THW Kiel (Germany)	45–43	(Croatia) Badel 1862 Zagreb	32–21	13–22
FC Barcelona (Spain)	59–52	(Slovenia) Celje Pivovarna Lasko	39–25	20–27

=== Finals ===
Team 1	Agg.	Team 2	1st leg	2nd leg
THW Kiel (Germany)	52–54	(Spain) FC Barcelona	28–25	24–29
