= 1962–63 European Cup (handball) =

European men's club handball tournament

European Cup
- 1962–63

Tournament information
- Sport: Handball

Final positions
- Champions: Dukla Prague

The 1962–63 European Cup was the fifth edition of Europe's premier club handball tournament. HC Dukla Prague won the tournament.

== Knockout stage ==
=== Round 1 ===
Team 1	Score	Team 2
THW Kiel (West Germany)	19–11	(Poland) Śląsk Wrocław
ROC Flemallois (Belgium)	17–11	(Luxembourg) HB Dudelange
Atlético Madrid BM (Spain)	13–6	(Portugal) Benfica
Skovbakken Aarhus (Denmark)	28–27	(Iceland) Fram Reykjavik
Operatie 55 Den Haag (Netherlands)	7–12	(Switzerland) Grasshoppers Zurich
Spartacus Budapest (Hungary)	25–14	(Austria) WAT Atzgersdorf

=== Round of 16 ===
Team 1	Score	Team 2
Dukla Prague (Czechoslovakia)	18–12	(West Germany) THW Kiel
SC DHfK Leipzig (East Germany)	25–17	(Soviet Union) Burevestnik Tbilisi
Frisch Auf Goppingen (West Germany)	40–14	(Belgium) ROC Flemallois
PUC Paris (France)	11–18	(Spain) Atletico Madrid BM
Arsenal Helsinki (Finland)	20–27	(Sweden) IK Heim Goteborg
IK Fredensborg Oslo (Norway)	9–10	(Denmark) Skovbakken Aarhus
Grasshoppers Zurich (Switzerland)	15–26	(Socialist Federal Republic of Yugoslavia) RK Zagreb
Dinamo Bucuresti (Romania)	24–11	(Hungary) Spartacus Budapest

=== Quarterfinals ===
Team 1	Agg.	Team 2	1st leg	2nd leg
SC DHfK Leipzig (East Germany)	25–30	(Czechoslovakia) Dukla Prague	14–9	11–21
Frisch Auf Göppingen (West Germany)	28–22	(Spain) Atletico Madrid BM	19–10	9–12
IK Heim Goteborg (Sweden)	33–38	(Denmark) Skovbakken Aarhus	19–17	14–21
Dinamo Bucuresti (Romania)	31–16	(Socialist Federal Republic of Yugoslavia) RK Zagreb	22–8	9–8

=== Semifinals ===
Team 1	Agg.	Team 2	1st leg	2nd leg
Frisch Auf Goppingen (West Germany)	21–33	(Czechoslovakia) Dukla Prague	7–9	14–24
Skovbakken Aarhus (Denmark)	22–28	(Romania) Dinamo Bucuresti	12–14	10–14

=== Finals ===
Team 1	Score	Team 2
Dukla Prague (Czechoslovakia)	15–13	(Romania) Dinamo Bucuresti
