= 1956–57 European Cup (handball) =

European men's club handball tournament

European Cup
- 1956–57

Tournament information
- Sport: Handball
- Dates: 18 November 1956–9 March 1957
- Administrator: French Handball Federation
- Participants: 12

Final positions
- Champions: Dukla Prague
- Runner-up: Örebro HK

Tournament statistics
- Matches played: 11

The 1956–57 Intercity European Cup was the first edition of Europe's premier club handball tournament.

== Knockout stage ==
=== Round 1 ===
Team 1	Score	Team 2
Liège (Belgium)	15–9	(Luxembourg) Esch-sur-Alzette

=== Round 2 ===
Team 1	Score	Team 2
Paris (France)	18–14	(Spain) Barcelona
Haßloch (West Germany)	27–8	(Belgium) Liège
Bucharest (Romania)	13–12	(Socialist Federal Republic of Yugoslavia) Belgrade

=== Quarterfinals ===
Team 1	Score	Team 2
Paris (France)	18–15	(West Germany) Haßloch
Dukla Prague (Czechoslovakia)	24–19	(Romania) Bucharest
Katowice (Poland)	12–22	(Denmark) HG København
Berlin (East Germany)	12–15	(Sweden) Örebro SK

=== Semifinals ===
Team 1	Score	Team 2
Dukla Prague (Czechoslovakia)	25–18	(Denmark) HG København
Örebro SK (Sweden)	30–17	(France) Paris

=== Finals ===
Team 1	Score	Team 2
Dukla Prague (Czechoslovakia)	19–14	(Sweden) Örebro SK
