= 1988–89 European Cup (handball) =

European men's club handball tournament

European Cup
- 1988–89

Tournament information
- Sport: Handball
- Dates: 27 October 1988–8 June 1989
- Administrator: IHF
- Participants: 28

Final positions
- Champions: (Soviet Union) SKA Minsk
- Runner-up: (Romania) Steaua București

The 1988–89 European Cup was the 29th edition of Europe's premier club handball tournament. SKA Minsk won their second title, beating Steaua București in the final.

== Knockout stage ==
=== Round 1 ===
Team 1	Agg.	Team 2	1st leg	2nd leg
Dukla Prague (Czechoslovakia)	70–30	(Luxembourg) Fola Esch	30–16	40–14
Wybrzeże Gdańsk (Poland)	50–39	(Norway) IF Urædd	22–16	28–23
Wagner Biro Graz (Austria)	33–47	(East Germany) SC Magdeburg	17–25	16–22
USAM Nîmes (France)	42–39	(Portugal) ABC Braga	27–21	15–18
Kyndil Tórshavn (Faroe Islands)	33–51	(Iceland) Valur Reykjavík	16–27	17–24
Amicitia Zürich (Switzerland)	44–39	(Belgium) Sporting Neerpelt	25–19	19–20
Raba ETO Györ (Hungary)	52–35	(Netherlands) Kwantum/Blauw-Wit Neerbeek	26–12	26–23
HK Drott Halmstad (Sweden)	54–38	(Finland) BK46 Karis	32–16	22–22
Hapoel Rishon LeZion (Israel)	47–48	(Greece) Filippos Veria H.C.	28–23	19–25
Ortigia Siracusa (Italy)	W.O.	(Cyprus) KN Anthoupolis		
KIF Kolding (Denmark)	62–24	(United Kingdom) HB Liverpool	32–12	30–12
Steaua București (Romania)	68–42	(Turkey) Turkye Halk Ankara	40–19	28–23

=== Round 2 ===
Team 1	Agg.	Team 2	1st leg	2nd leg
SKA Minsk (Soviet Union)	55–43	(Socialist Federal Republic of Yugoslavia) RK Metaloplastika	30–21	25–22
Dukla Prague (Czechoslovakia)	56–44	(Poland) Wybrzeże Gdańsk	31–19	25–25
SC Magdeburg (East Germany)	48–38	(France) USAM Nîmes	23–13	25–25
Amicitia Zürich (Switzerland)	38–40	(Iceland) Valur Reykjavík	16–15	22–25
VfL Gummersbach (Germany)	32–35	(Spain) FC Barcelona	17–15	15–20
HK Drott Halmstad (Sweden)	45–41	(Hungary) Raba ETO Györ	23–18	22–23
Ortigia Siracusa (Italy)	48–48	(Greece) Filippos Verias	25–19	23–29
KIF Kolding (Denmark)	42–53	(Romania) Steaua București	21–25	21–28

=== Quarterfinals ===
Team 1	Agg.	Team 2	1st leg	2nd leg
SKA Minsk (Soviet Union)	62–42	(Czechoslovakia) Dukla Prague	32–19	30–23
Valur Reykjavík (Iceland)	37–37	(East Germany) SC Magdeburg	22–16	15–21
HK Drott Halmstad (Sweden)	48–44	(Spain) FC Barcelona	22–20	26–24
Ortigia Siracusa (Italy)	43–53	(Romania) Steaua București	22–26	21–27

=== Semifinals ===
Team 1	Agg.	Team 2	1st leg	2nd leg
SC Magdeburg (East Germany)	46–55	(Soviet Union) SKA Minsk	26–25	20–30
HK Drott Halmstad (Sweden)	45–53	(Romania) Steaua București	23–24	22–29

=== Finals ===
Team 1	Agg.	Team 2	1st leg	2nd leg
Steaua București (Romania)	53–61	(Soviet Union) SKA Minsk	30–24	23–37
