= 1998–99 EHF Champions League =

European handball tournament

EHF Champions League
- 1998–99

Tournament information
- Sport: Handball
- Dates: 27 August 1998–29 April 1999
- Administrator: EHF
- Participants: 33

Final positions
- Champions: FC Barcelona

Tournament statistics
- Top scorer: (Croatia) Zlatko Saračević (90 goals)

The 1998–99 EHF Champions League was the 39th edition of Europe's premier club handball tournament. FC Barcelona won their 5th title and 4th in a row. For a second time in a row they beat Badel 1862 Zagreb in the final.

== Group stage ==
=== Group A ===
Team	Pld	W	D	L	GF	GA	GD	Pts
(Croatia) Badel 1862 Zagreb	6	5	0	1	150	127	+23	10
(Hungary) Fotex KC Veszprém	6	3	0	3	147	130	+17	6
(France) Montpellier HB	6	3	0	3	134	134	0	6
(Italy) H.C. Alpi Prato	6	1	0	5	128	168	−40	2

=== Group B ===
Team	Pld	W	D	L	GF	GA	GD	Pts
(Spain) FC Barcelona	6	5	1	0	186	135	+51	11
(Ukraine) ZTR Zaporozhye	6	3	0	3	148	154	−6	6
(Switzerland) Pfadi Winterthur	6	2	1	3	154	160	−6	5
(Belarus) SKA Minsk	6	1	0	5	136	175	−39	2

=== Group C ===
Team	Pld	W	D	L	GF	GA	GD	Pts
(Germany) THW Kiel	6	6	0	0	181	149	+32	12
(Russia) HC Kaustik Volgograd	6	3	0	3	166	168	−2	6
(Denmark) GOG Gudme	6	2	0	4	160	180	−20	4
(Norway) Viking HK Stavanger	6	1	0	5	166	176	−10	2

=== Group D ===
Team	Pld	W	D	L	GF	GA	GD	Pts
(Slovenia) Celje Pivovarna Lasko	6	4	1	1	178	142	+36	9
(Spain) Portland San Antonio	6	4	0	2	167	158	+9	8
(Sweden) Redbergslids Göteborg	6	3	1	2	146	141	+5	7
(Czech Republic) HC Kovopetrol Plzen	6	0	0	6	129	179	−50	0

== Knockout stage ==
=== Quarterfinals ===
Team 1	Agg.	Team 2	1st leg	2nd leg
ZTR Zaporozhye (Ukraine)	43–48	(Croatia) Badel 1862 Zagreb	21–22	22–26
Fotex KC Veszprém (Hungary)	53–58	(Spain) FC Barcelona	29–29	24–29
THW Kiel (Germany)	48–50	(Spain) Portland San Antonio	21–24	27–26
HC Kaustik Volgograd (Russia)	41–51	(Slovenia) Celje Pivovarna Lasko	18–22	23–29

=== Semifinals ===
Team 1	Agg.	Team 2	1st leg	2nd leg
Celje Pivovarna Lasko (Slovenia)	61–62	(Spain) FC Barcelona	35–32	26–30
Badel 1862 Zagreb (Croatia)	50–48	(Spain) Portland San Antonio	27–22	23–26

=== Finals ===
Team 1	Agg.	Team 2	1st leg	2nd leg
Badel 1862 Zagreb (Croatia)	40–51	(Spain) FC Barcelona	22–22	18–29
