= 1959–60 European Cup (handball) =

European men's club handball tournament

European Cup
- 1959–60

Tournament information
- Sport: Handball
- Administrator: IHF
- Defending champions: Redbergslids IK

Final positions
- Champions: Frisch Auf Göppingen (1st title)
- Runner-up: AGF Håndbold

The 1959–60 European Cup was the third edition of Europe's premier club handball tournament.

== Knockout stage ==
=== Round 1 ===
Team 1	Score	Team 2
Frisch Auf Göppingen (West Germany)	wo	(Finland) Union Helsinki
TV Aalsmeer (Netherlands)	17–13	(Switzerland) BTV St. Gallen
Sparta Katowice (Poland)	13–13	(Romania) Dinamo Bucuresti
Dukla Prague (Czechoslovakia)	31–19	(Socialist Federal Republic of Yugoslavia) Borac Banja Luka
Redbergslids IK Goteborg (Sweden)	bye	
AGF Aarhus (Denmark)	24–11	(Norway) Fredensborg SBK Oslo
FC Porto (Portugal)	21–11	(Belgium) ROC Flemallois
USC Paris (France)	15–12	(Luxembourg) SC Esch

Team 1	Score	Team 2
Sparta Katowice (Poland)	11–14	(Romania) Dinamo Bucuresti

=== Quarterfinals ===
Team 1	Score	Team 2
Frisch Auf Göppingen (West Germany)	27–12	(Netherlands) TV Aalsmeer
Dinamo Bucuresti (Romania)	23–22	(Czechoslovakia) Dukla Prague
AGF Aarhus (Denmark)	17–16	(Sweden) Redbergslids IK Goteborg
USC Paris (France)	18–13	(Portugal) FC Porto

=== Semifinals ===
Team 1	Score	Team 2
Frisch Auf Göppingen (West Germany)	10–8	(Romania) Dinamo Bucuresti
AGF Aarhus (Denmark)	20–10	(France) USC Paris

=== Finals ===
Team 1	Score	Team 2
Frisch Auf Göppingen (West Germany)	18–13	(Denmark) AGF Aarhus
