= Jørgen Frandsen =

Danish handball player (born 1944)

Jørgen Frandsen (October 31, 1944, in Gilleleje, Denmark – May 14, 2023) was a Danish handball player who competed in the 1972 Summer Olympics and in the 1976 Summer Olympics. He played his club handball with IF Stadion and Lynge-Uggeløse. He debuted for the Danish national team in December 1967 against Czechoslovakia. In 1972, he was part of the Denmark men's national handball team which finished thirteenth in the 1972 Olympic tournament. He played three matches and scored one goal. Four years later, he finished eighth with the Danish team in the 1976 Olympic tournament. He played all six matches and scored two goals.

In total he played 144 matches for the Danish national team, scoring 147 goals.
