= 1989–90 European Cup (handball) =

European men's club handball tournament

European Cup
- 1989–90

Tournament information
- Sport: Handball
- Administrator: IHF
- Participants: 28

Final positions
- Champions: (Soviet Union) SKA Minsk
- Runner-up: (Spain) FC Barcelona

The 1989–90 European Cup was the 30th edition of Europe's premier club handball tournament. SKA Minsk won their 3rd title and their 2nd title in a row.

== Knockout stage ==
=== Round 1 ===
Team 1	Agg.	Team 2	1st leg	2nd leg
BK46 Karis (Finland)	47–56	(Norway) Stavanger IF	30–25	17–31
Raba ETO Györ (Hungary)	56–38	(Greece) Filippos Veria H.C.	33–15	23–23
Kyndil Tórshavn (Faroe Islands)	41–55	(Iceland) Valur Reykjavík	27–26	14–29
TUSEM Essen (Germany)	51–35	(Netherlands) HV Haka Emmen	26–17	25–18
RK Chromos Zagreb (Socialist Federal Republic of Yugoslavia)	46–39	(Poland) Pogoń Zabrze	29–20	17–19
Helsingør IF (Denmark)	60–28	(Luxembourg) Fola Esch	30–11	30–17
Ortigia Siracusa (Italy)	51–39	(Turkey) Arçelik SC İstanbul	30–18	21–21
Sporting Neerpelt (Belgium)	37–38	(Austria) UHK Volksbank Wien	22–17	15–21
Maccabi Rishon LeZion (Israel)	30–53	(France) US Créteil	15–29	15–24
Amicitia Zürich (Switzerland)	81–21	(United Kingdom) Manchester United HB	41–12	40–9
VSŽ Košice (Czechoslovakia)	36–39	(Bulgaria) CSKA Sofia	21–16	15–23
FC Barcelona (Spain)	46–37	(Portugal) Benfica Lisboa	28–17	18–20

=== Round 2 ===
Team 1	Agg.	Team 2	1st leg	2nd leg
SKA Minsk (Soviet Union)	67–46	(Norway) Stavanger IF	39–21	28–25
Raba ETO Györ (Hungary)	60–44	(Iceland) Valur Reykjavík	29–23	31–21
Steaua București (Romania)	44–51	(Germany) TUSEM Essen	21–22	23–29
RK Chromos Zagreb (Socialist Federal Republic of Yugoslavia)	55–41	(Denmark) Helsingør IF	28–19	27–22
Ortigia Siracusa (Italy)	33–43	(East Germany) ASK Vorwärts Frankfurt/Oder	17–17	16–26
UHK Volksbank Wien (Austria)	37–40	(France) US Créteil	19–19	18–21
Redbergslids IK (Sweden)	37–34	(Switzerland) Amicitia Zürich	16–16	21–18
CSKA Sofia (Bulgaria)	37–62	(Spain) FC Barcelona	16–26	21–36

=== Quarterfinals ===
Team 1	Agg.	Team 2	1st leg	2nd leg
Raba ETO Györ (Hungary)	43–60	(Soviet Union) SKA Minsk	21–29	22–31
TUSEM Essen (Germany)	50–49	(Socialist Federal Republic of Yugoslavia) RK Chromos Zagreb	24–17	26–32
ASK Vorwärts Frankfurt/Oder (East Germany)	33–39	(France) US Créteil	17–17	16–22
Redbergslids IK (Sweden)	41–44	(Spain) FC Barcelona	22–16	19–28

=== Semifinals ===
Team 1	Agg.	Team 2	1st leg	2nd leg
SKA Minsk (Soviet Union)	55–45	(Germany) TUSEM Essen	27–17	28–28
FC Barcelona (Spain)	43–37	(France) US Créteil	23–18	20–19

=== Finals ===
Team 1	Agg.	Team 2	1st leg	2nd leg
SKA Minsk (Soviet Union)	53–50	(Spain) FC Barcelona	26–21	27–29
