= AGF Håndbold =

Danish handball club

- Full name: Aarhus Gymnastikforening Håndbold
- Short name: AGF
- Founded: 1880 (handball department in 1935)
- Arena: Ceres Stadionhal
- Capacity: 1.200
- President: Jakob Haldrup
- Head coach: Peter Conrad
- League: Danish 1st Division
- 2024-25: 4th
- Club colours
Home	Away

AGF Håndbold is a handball club from Aarhus, Denmark and is a part of the broader multisportsclub Aarhus Gymnastikforening. Currently, AGF Håndbold competes in the women's Danish 1st Division. The home arena of the club is Atletion.

The club has 500 members, and a total of 24 youth teams and 9 senior teams.

== History ==
While the sports club overall was founded in 1880, the Handball department was founded in 1935. This makes it one of the oldest handball clubs in the country and the oldest handball club in Aarhus.

The women's club has won two Danish Championships, in the 1941-1942 and the 1948–1949 season. The men's team won four championships between 1957 and 1965. In 1959-60 they reached the final of the European Cup as the first Danish team, and the only Danish team until Aalborg Håndbold did it in the 2023-24 edition. The team boasted national team players like Leif Gelvad, Poul Sørensen, Knud Erik Jensen, Jørgen Lundby and Poul Locht. During this time period Aarhus was the dominating city in handball with VRI, Skovbakken and Aarhus KFUM also winning championship titles.

In the 1968-1969 season the team was relegated from the top division, and in the 70's and 80's the team was an elevator team between the 1st and 2nd tier.

=== Merger with Aarhus KFUM ===
In 2001 the club participated in the merger club Aarhus Håndbold, but they withdrew from the project in 2010. Their best result in this period was a 2nd place in the 2004–05 season.

=== Skanderborg AGF Håndbold ===
Aarhus Håndbold later fused with Skanderborg Håndbold, and became Skanderborg Aarhus Håndbold. In June 2023 AGF bought 50% of the stakes in Skanderborg AGF Håndbold.

== Accomplishments ==
- Danish Men's Handball League: 4
  - 1957, 1959, 1961, 1965
- Danish Men's Handball Cup: 1
  - 1967
- Danish Women's Handball League: 2
  - 1942, 1949

== See also ==
- Aarhus Gymnastikforening
- Skanderborg AGF Håndbold
- Aarhus Håndbold
