= IF Stadion =

Danish handball club

Idrætsforeningen Stadion, usually just called IF Stadion, is a Danish handball club from Brønshøj, a suburb of Copenhagen. The club was founded in 1906, which makes it one of the oldest clubs in Denmark. The club was created as an athletics clubs, but today handball is the only sport practiced.

It is most famous for winning the Danish Championship twice, in 1972 and 1973. They have also won the Danish Cup once in 1969, as well as reaching the final 5 times. Today the club plays in the 3rd Division, the fourth tier of Danish handball.

The team plays in yellow shirts and green shorts at home and in red shirts and black shorts away.

== Notable former players ==
- (Denmark) Svend Lund
- (Denmark) Jørgen Frandsen
- (Denmark) Daniel Svensson
