= Hapoel Rehovot =

Israeli handball club

הפועל רחובות Hapoel Rehovot
- Full name: Hapoel Rehovot
- Founded: 1955
- Dissolved: 2002
- President: Menachem Frishler
- Head coach: Yehuda Sandler
- League: top league
- Club colours

Hapoel Rehovot was a handball team from the city of Rehovot, Israel.

Hapoel was the biggest handball club in Israel until the mid-1980s; they won 13 championships and 5 Israeli cups. They also competed 9 times in the European Cup, but never managed to pass the second round. The last time the club competed in a European competition was in the 1995-96 EHF Cup Winners' Cup.

After some bad years in the late 1990s, the team was dissolved in 2002.

== Titles ==
- Israel Champions (13): 1957, 1961, 1964, 1965, 1968, 1973, 1975, 1976, 1977, 1979, 1982, 1983, 1984
- Israel Cup Holder (5): 1979, 1980, 1982, 1984, 1985
