= Maccabi Petah Tikva (handball) =

Israeli handball team

מכבי פתח תקווה Maccabi Petah Tikva
- Full name: Maccabi Ironi Petah Tikva
- Founded: 1960
- Arena: Ironi hall, Petah Tikva
- Capacity: 900
- President: Raphi Halaf
- Head coach: Beni Ingal
- League: Liga Leumit
- 2015-16: 4

Maccabi Petah Tikva is a handball team from the city of Petah Tikva, Israel.

Maccabi is one of the oldest handball clubs in the country, the most successful period was in the late 70's and early 80's when the team won 3 championships and two State cups.

In August 1997 Maccabi merged with Hapoel Petah Tikva and played as Ironi Petah Tikva for 12 seasons in the top division. In September 2009 the merger was over as the supporters of Hapoel reformed their team.

== Titles ==
- Israel Champions (3): 1978, 1980, 1981
- Israel Cup Holder (2): 1977, 1981
