= RK Bjelovar =

Croatian men's handball club

- Full name: Rukometni klub Bjelovar
- Founded: 1955
- Arena: Dvorana Europskih Prvaka
- Capacity: 1,500
- President: Dario Kudumija
- Head coach: Josip Pećina
- League: Croatian Premier League
- 2021–22: Croatian Premier League, 7th of 16
Home	Away

RK Bjelovar (Rukometni Klub Bjelovar) is a team handball club from Bjelovar, Croatia formed in 1955. The club currently competes in the Croatian Second League of Handball (North) and the Croatian Handball Cup.

During Communist Yugoslavia, the club was known as Partizan, named after the Second World War's Yugoslav Partisans. After Croatian independence in 1991, the current name was adopted. Despite being the most successful club in Yugoslavia, it has had little success since the 1980 season and has been thoroughly eclipsed by RK Zagreb in modern Croatian handball.

Location of Bjelovar in Croatia

== Crest, colours, supporters ==
=== Kits ===
AWAY

2011–12

== Accomplishments ==
- National Championship of Yugoslavia: 9
  - 1958, 1961, 1967, 1968, 1970, 1971, 1972, 1977, 1979
- EHF Champions League:
  - 1972
- EHF Champions League Finalist:
  - 1962, 1973
- EHF Champions League Semifinalist:
  - 1968, 1971

== Players ==
- Hrvoje Horvat
- Albin Vidović
- Vladimir Smiljanić-Babura
- Miroslav Pribanić
- Željko Nimš
- Zvonimir Serdarušić
- Boris Bradić
- Pavle Jurina
- Mirko Bašić
- Željko Vidaković
- Rastko Stefanović
- Dalibor Sokač
- Goran Šoštarec
- Antonio Pribanić
- Mario Vuglač
- Mohsen Karamian
- Miroslav Milinović

== Famous coaches ==
- Željko Seleš
- Ante Kostelić (father of Janica Kostelić and Ivica Kostelić)
