= HV Sittardia =

Dutch handball club

- Full name: Handbalvereniging Sittardia
- Short name: Sittardia
- Founded: 1949
- Arena: Stadssporthal, Sittard
- Capacity: 1930
- Club colours
Home	Away

HV Sittardia is a Dutch professional handball club in Sittard. The club was founded in 1949.

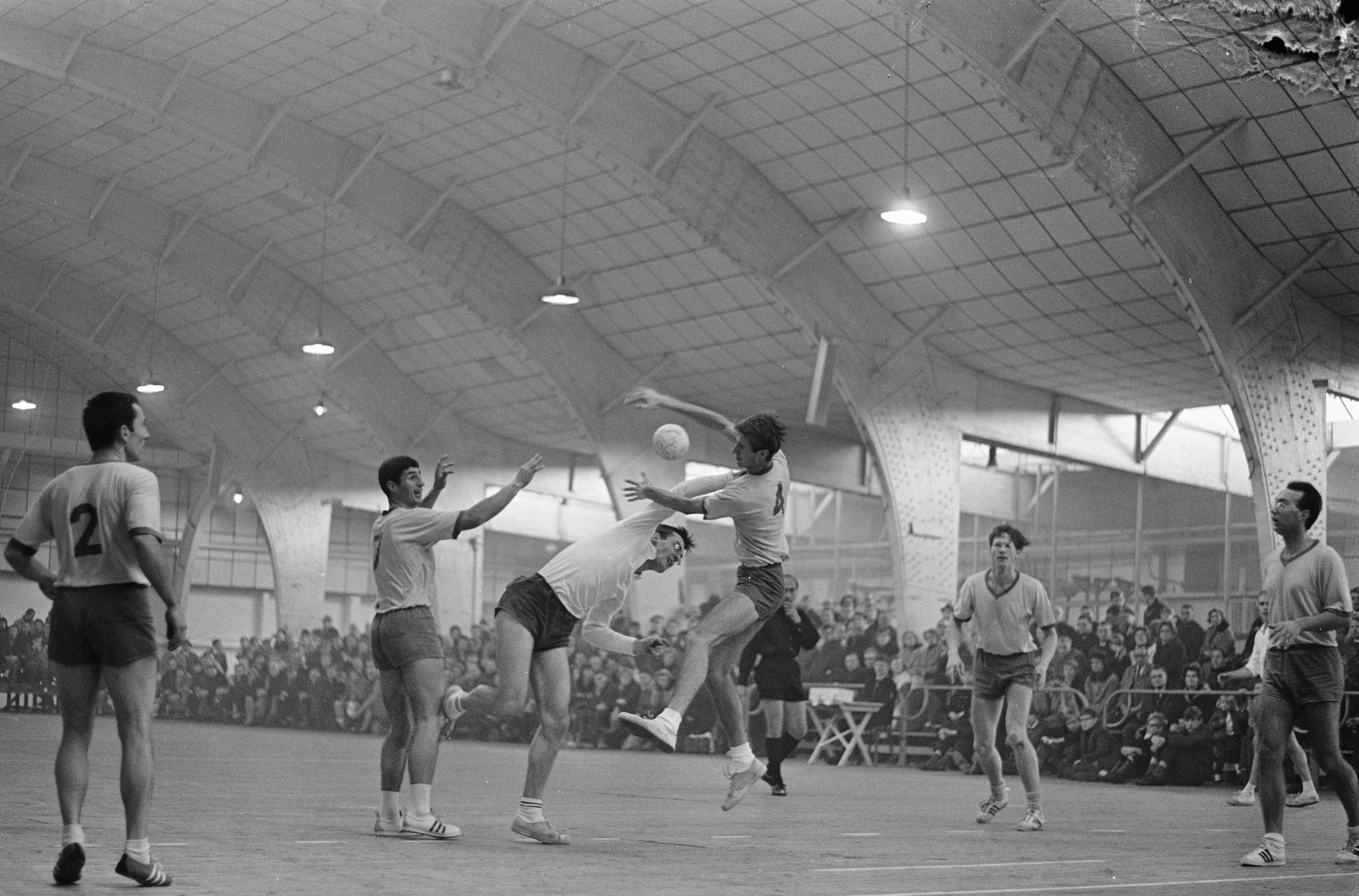
Aalsmeer against Sittardia (10-17), player of Aalsmeer fires at the goal. (1966)

Sittardia is one of the most successful handball teams in Dutch handball history. They won the Dutch National Championship in 1966, 1968, 1969, 1970, 1971, 1972, 1973, 1974, 1975, 1976, 1977, 1979, 1987, 1990, 1993, 1994, 1997 and 1999. In 2007, they nearly became champion again, but they lost the finals against Volendam. The club has participated in European club team tournaments several times.

In 2008, Sittardia co-operated with V&L and HV BFC to form a stronger men's team. The project was called Tophandbal Zuid-Limburg and two team were formed: Limburg Lions and Limburg Wild Dogs (later turned into the second team of Limburg Lions). In 2016, the management of BFC decided to take no longer part in the collabation.

== Accomplishments ==
=== Men ===
- NHV Eredivisie:
  - Winners (16) : 1966, 1968, 1969, 1970, 1971, 1972, 1973, 1974, 1975, 1976, 1979, 1987, 1993, 1994, 1997, 1999
  - Runner-Up (8) : 1980, 1983, 1984, 1986, 1995, 2000, 2001, 2007
- Dutch Handball Cup:
  - Winners (7) : 1979, 1980, 1981, 1984, 1995, 1997, 2001
  - Runner-Up (2) : 1987, 1992
- Dutch Supercup:
  - Winners (5) : 1992, 1994, 1995, 1997, 1999
  - Runner-Up (2) : 1993, 2001

=== Woman ===
- Dutch Handball Cup:
  - Runner-Up (2) : 1981, 1982

== Former players ==
- hencodejong
