= List of European Cup and EHF Champions League winning players =

Player	Nationality	Clubs		Titles Won		Notes
Player	Nationality	#	List	#	Winning Years	Notes
Mamadou Diocou	Spain	1	Barcelona	1	2021	
Jure Dolenec	Slovenia	1	Barcelona	1	2021	
Luís Frade	Portugal	1	Barcelona	1	2021	
Aleix Gómez	Spain	1	Barcelona	1	2021	
Blaž Janc	Slovenia	1	Barcelona	1	2021	
Haniel Langaro	Brazil	1	Barcelona	1	2021	
Domen Makuc	Slovenia	1	Barcelona	1	2021	
Dika Mem	France	1	Barcelona	1	2021	
Kevin Møller	Denmark	1	Barcelona	1	2021	
Casper Ulrich Mortensen	Denmark	1	Barcelona	1	2021	
Timothey N'Guessan	France	1	Barcelona	1	2021	
Álex Pascual García	Spain	1	Barcelona	1	2021	
Thiagus Petrus	Brazil	1	Barcelona	1	2021	
Aitor Ariño	Spain	1	Barcelona	2	2015, 2021	
Luka Cindrić	Croatia	2	RK Vardar, Barcelona	2	2017, 2021	
Ludovic Fabregas	France	2	Montpellier, Barcelona	2	2018, 2021	
Raúl Entrerríos	Spain	1	Barcelona	3	2011, 2015, 2021	
Gonzalo Perez de Vargas	Spain	1	Barcelona	3	2011, 2015, 2021	
Cédric Sorhaindo	France	1	Barcelona	3	2011, 2015, 2021	
Aron Pálmarsson	Iceland	2	THW Kiel, Barcelona	3	2010, 2012, 2021	
Mattias Andersson	Sweden	1	THW Kiel	1	2020	
Nikola Bilyk	Austria	1	THW Kiel	1	2020	
Bevan Calvert	Australia	1	THW Kiel	1	2020	
Rune Dahmke	Germany	1	THW Kiel	1	2020	
Niclas Ekberg	Sweden	1	THW Kiel	1	2020	
Pavel Horák	Czech Republic	1	THW Kiel	1	2020	
Magnus Landin Jacobsen	Denmark	1	THW Kiel	1	2020	
Niklas Landin Jacobsen	Denmark	1	THW Kiel	1	2020	
Lukas Nilsson	Sweden	1	THW Kiel	1	2020	
Hendrik Pekeler	Germany	1	THW Kiel	1	2020	
Dario Quenstedt	Germany	1	THW Kiel	1	2020	
Ole Rahmel	Germany	1	THW Kiel	1	2020	
Harald Reinkind	Norway	1	THW Kiel	1	2020	
Sander Sagosen	Norway	1	THW Kiel	1	2020	
Oskar Sunnefeldt	Sweden	1	THW Kiel	1	2020	
Malte Voigt	Germany	1	THW Kiel	1	2020	
Philipp Wäger	Germany	1	THW Kiel	1	2020	
Patrick Wiencek	Germany	1	THW Kiel	1	2020	
Miha Zarabec	Slovenia	1	THW Kiel	1	2020	
Domagoj Duvnjak	Croatia	2	Hamburg, THW Kiel	2	2013, 2020	
Steffen Weinhold	Germany	2	SG Flensburg-Handewitt, THW Kiel	2	2014, 2020	
Dainis Krištopāns	Latvia	1	RK Vardar	1	2019	
Dejan Milosavljev	Serbia	1	RK Vardar	1	2019	
Christian Dissinger	Germany	1	RK Vardar	1	2019	
Sergei Gorbok	Russia	1	RK Vardar	1	2019	
Gleb Kalarash	Russia	1	RK Vardar	1	2019	
Staš Skube	Slovenia	1	RK Vardar	1	2019	
Dmitrii Kiselev	Russia	1	RK Vardar	1	2019	
Khalifa Ghedbane	Algeria	1	RK Vardar	1	2019	
Martin Popovski	North Macedonia	1	RK Vardar	1	2019	
Vid Kavtičnik	Slovenia	2	THW Kiel, Montpellier	2	2007, 2018	
Michaël Guigou	France	1	Montpellier	2	2003, 2018	
Diego Simonet	Argentina	1	Montpellier	1	2018	
Mohamed Mamdouh Shebib	Egypt	1	Montpellier	1	2018	
Melvyn Richardson	France	1	Montpellier	1	2018	
Jean-Loup Faustin	France	1	Montpellier	1	2018	
Mohamed Soussi	Tunisia	1	Montpellier	1	2018	
Jonas Truchanovicius	Lithuania	1	Montpellier	1	2018	
Arnaud Bingo	France	1	Montpellier	1	2018	
Baptiste Bonnefond	France	1	Montpellier	1	2018	
Théophile Caussé	France	1	Montpellier	1	2018	
Vincent Gérard	France	1	Montpellier	1	2018	
Valentin Porte	France	1	Montpellier	1	2018	
Nikola Portner	Switzerland	1	Montpellier	1	2018	
Killian Villeminot	France	1	Montpellier	1	2018	
Arpad Sterbik	Spain	2	Ciudad Real, RK Vardar	4	2006, 2008, 2009, 2017	
Ivan Čupić	Croatia	2	Kielce, RK Vardar	3	2016, 2017, 2019	
Timur Dibirov	Russia	1	RK Vardar	2	2017, 2019	
Vuko Borozan	Montenegro	1	RK Vardar	2	2017, 2019	
Daniil Shishkaryov	Russia	1	RK Vardar	2	2017, 2019	
Joan Cañellas	Spain	1	RK Vardar	1	2017	
Alex Dujshebaev	Spain	1	RK Vardar	1	2017	
Ilija Abutović	Serbia	1	RK Vardar	1	2017	
Mijajlo Marsenić	Serbia	1	RK Vardar	1	2017	
Aleksandr Dereven	Russia	1	RK Vardar	1	2017	
Rogério Moraes Ferreira	Brazil	1	RK Vardar	2	2017, 2019	
Igor Karačić	Croatia	1	RK Vardar	2	2017, 2019	
Jorge Maqueda	Spain	1	RK Vardar	1	2017	
Strahinja Milić	Serbia	1	RK Vardar	1	2017	
Stojanče Stoilov	Macedonia	1	RK Vardar	2	2017, 2019	
Uroš Zorman	Slovenia	3	Celje, Ciudad Real, Kielce	4	2004, 2008, 2009, 2016	
Tobias Reichmann	Germany	2	THW Kiel, Kielce	3	2010, 2012, 2016	
Karol Bielecki	Poland	1	Kielce	1	2016	
Julen Aguinagalde	Spain	1	Kielce	1	2016	
Krzysztof Lijewski	Poland	1	Kielce	1	2016	
Manuel Štrlek	Croatia	1	Kielce	1	2016	
Michał Jurecki	Poland	1	Kielce	1	2016	
Mateusz Jachlewski	Poland	1	Kielce	1	2016	
Piotr Chrapkowski	Poland	1	Kielce	1	2016	
Mateusz Kus	Poland	1	Kielce	1	2016	
Krzysztof Markowski	Poland	1	Kielce	1	2016	
Paweł Paczkowski	Poland	1	Kielce	1	2016	
Marin Šego	Croatia	1	Kielce	1	2016	
Sławomir Szmal	Poland	1	Kielce	1	2016	
Grzegorz Tkaczyk	Poland	1	Kielce	1	2016	
Siarhei Rutenka	Belarus	3	Celje, Ciudad Real, Barcelona	6	2004, 2006, 2008, 2009, 2011, 2015	
Nikola Karabatić	France	3	Montpellier, THW Kiel, Barcelona	3	2003, 2007, 2015	
Víctor Tomás	Spain	1	Barcelona	3	2005, 2011, 2015	
Jesper Nøddesbo	Denmark	1	Barcelona	2	2011, 2015	
Daniel Sarmiento	Spain	1	Barcelona	2	2011, 2015	
Viran Morros	Spain	2	Ciudad Real, Barcelona	2	2009, 2015	
Danijel Šarić	Bosnia and Herzegovina	1	Barcelona	2	2011, 2015	
Guðjón Valur Sigurðsson	Iceland	1	Barcelona	1	2015	
Eduardo Gurbindo	Spain	1	Barcelona	1	2015	
Wael Jallouz	Tunisia	1	Barcelona	1	2015	
Kiril Lazarov	Macedonia	1	Barcelona	1	2015	
Alejandro Marquez Coloma	Spain	1	Barcelona	1	2015	
Mattias Andersson	Sweden	2	THW Kiel, SG Flensburg-Handewitt	2	2007, 2014	
Anders Eggert	Denmark	1	SG Flensburg-Handewitt	1	2014	
Lasse Svan Hansen	Denmark	1	SG Flensburg-Handewitt	1	2014	
Holger Glandorf	Germany	1	SG Flensburg-Handewitt	1	2014	
Thomas Mogensen	Denmark	1	SG Flensburg-Handewitt	1	2014	
Jim Gottfridsson	Sweden	1	SG Flensburg-Handewitt	1	2014	
Jacob Heinl	Germany	1	SG Flensburg-Handewitt	1	2014	
Goran Bogunovic	Croatia	1	SG Flensburg-Handewitt	1	2014	
Ólafur Gústafsson	Iceland	1	SG Flensburg-Handewitt	1	2014	
Tobias Karlsson	Sweden	1	SG Flensburg-Handewitt	1	2014	
Michael V. Knudsen	Denmark	1	SG Flensburg-Handewitt	1	2014	
Draško Nenadić	Serbia	1	SG Flensburg-Handewitt	1	2014	
Bogdan Radivojević	Serbia	1	SG Flensburg-Handewitt	1	2014	
Sørenn Rasmussen	Denmark	1	SG Flensburg-Handewitt	1	2014	
Hampus Wanne	Sweden	1	SG Flensburg-Handewitt	1	2014	
Johannes Bitter	Germany	1	Hamburg	1	2013	
Michael Kraus	Germany	1	Hamburg	1	2013	
Stefan Schröder	Germany	1	Hamburg	1	2013	
Torsten Jansen	Germany	1	Hamburg	1	2013	
Blaženko Lacković	Croatia	1	Hamburg	1	2013	
Matthias Flohr	Germany	1	Hamburg	1	2013	
Igor Vori	Croatia	1	Hamburg	1	2013	
Max-Henri Herrmann	France	1	Hamburg	1	2013	
Hans Lindberg	Denmark	1	Hamburg	1	2013	
Stefan Terzić	Serbia	1	Hamburg	1	2013	
Andreas Nilsson	Sweden	1	Hamburg	1	2013	
Marcin Lijewski	Poland	1	Hamburg	1	2013	
Pascal Hens	Germany	1	Hamburg	1	2013	
Fredrik Petersen	Sweden	1	Hamburg	1	2013	
Thierry Omeyer	France	2	Montpellier, THW Kiel	4	2003, 2007, 2010, 2012	
Kim Andersson	Sweden	1	THW Kiel	3	2007, 2010, 2012	
Henrik Lundström	Sweden	1	THW Kiel	3	2007, 2010, 2012	
Christian Zeitz	Germany	1	THW Kiel	3	2007, 2010, 2012	
Dominik Klein	Germany	1	THW Kiel	3	2007, 2010, 2012	
Christian Sprenger	Germany	1	THW Kiel	2	2010, 2012	
Andreas Palicka	Sweden	1	THW Kiel	2	2010, 2012	
Marcus Ahlm	Sweden	1	THW Kiel	2	2010, 2012	
Daniel Narcisse	France	1	THW Kiel	2	2010, 2012	
Momir Ilić	Serbia	1	THW Kiel	2	2010, 2012	
Filip Jícha	Czech Republic	1	THW Kiel	2	2010, 2012	
Daniel Kubes	Czech Republic	1	THW Kiel	1	2012	
Iker Romero	Spain	1	Barcelona	2	2005, 2011	
László Nagy	Hungary	1	Barcelona	2	2005, 2011	
Juanín García	Spain	1	Barcelona	1	2011	
Cristian Ugalde	Spain	1	Barcelona	1	2011	
Magnus Jernemyr	Sweden	1	Barcelona	1	2011	
Albert Rocas	Spain	1	Barcelona	1	2011	
Konstantin Igropulo	Russia	1	Barcelona	1	2011	
Igor Anić	France	1	THW Kiel	1	2010	
Børge Lund	Norway	1	THW Kiel	1	2010	
Peter Gentzel	Sweden	1	THW Kiel	1	2010	
José Javier Hombrados	Spain	3	TEKA Santander, Portland San Antonio, Ciudad Real	5	1994, 2001, 2006, 2008, 2009	
Ólafur Stefánsson	Iceland	2	Magdeburg, Ciudad Real	4	2002, 2006, 2008, 2009	
Didier Dinart	France	2	Montpellier, Ciudad Real	4	2003, 2006, 2008, 2009	
Jonas Källman	Sweden	1	Ciudad Real	3	2006, 2008, 2009	
Petar Metličić	Croatia	1	Ciudad Real	3	2006, 2008, 2009	
Alberto Entrerríos	Spain	1	Ciudad Real	3	2006, 2008, 2009	
Jérôme Fernandez	France	2	Barcelona, Ciudad Real	2	2005, 2009	
Roberto García Parrondo	Spain	1	Ciudad Real	2	2008, 2009	
Luc Abalo	France	1	Ciudad Real	1	2009	
José María Rodríguez	Spain	1	Ciudad Real	1	2009	
Aleš Pajovič	Slovenia	1	Ciudad Real	2	2006, 2008	
Rolando Uríos	Spain	1	Ciudad Real	2	2006, 2008	
Torsten Laen	Norway	1	Ciudad Real	1	2008	
Josep Masachs Gelma	Spain	1	Ciudad Real	1	2008	
Andrei Xepkin	Spain	2	Barcelona, THW Kiel	7	1996, 1997, 1998, 1999, 2000, 2005, 2007	
Per Tomas Linders	Sweden	1	THW Kiel	1	2007	
Stefan Lövgren	Sweden	1	THW Kiel	1	2007	
Julio Fis	Spain	1	Ciudad Real	1	2006	
David Davis	Spain	1	Ciudad Real	1	2006	
Mirza Džomba	Croatia	1	Ciudad Real	1	2006	
Claus Møller Jakobsen	Denmark	1	Ciudad Real	1	2006	
David Barrufet	Spain	1	Barcelona	7	1991, 1996, 1997, 1998, 1999, 2000, 2005	
Xavier O'Callaghan	Spain	1	Barcelona	6	1991, 1997, 1998, 1999, 2000, 2005	
Dejan Perić	Serbia	2	Celje, Barcelona	2	2004, 2005	
Salvador Puig Asbert	Spain	1	Barcelona	1	2005	
Fernando Hernández	Spain	1	Barcelona	1	2005	
Lars Krogh Jeppesen	Denmark	1	Barcelona	1	2005	
Dragan Škrbić	Spain	1	Barcelona	1	2005	
Luka Žvižej	Slovenia	1	Barcelona	1	2005	
Davor Dominiković	Croatia	1	Barcelona	1	2005	
Renato Vugrinec	Slovenia	1	Celje	1	2004	
Marko Oštir	Slovenia	1	Celje	1	2004	
Nenad Bilbija	Slovenia	1	Celje	1	2004	
Dino Bajram	Slovenia	1	Celje	1	2004	
Miladin Kozlina	Slovenia	1	Celje	1	2004	
Gregor Lorger	Slovenia	1	Celje	1	2004	
Žikica Milosavljević	Serbia	1	Celje	1	2004	
Mihael Gorensek	Slovenia	1	Celje	1	2004	
Jure Natek	Slovenia	1	Celje	1	2004	
Matjaž Brumen	Slovenia	1	Celje	1	2004	
Eduard Koksharov	Russia	1	Celje	1	2004	
Damien Kabengele	France	1	Montpellier	1	2003	
Grégory Anquetil	France	1	Montpellier	1	2003	
Laurent Puigségur	France	1	Montpellier	1	2003	
Rastko Stefanovič	Slovenia	1	Montpellier	1	2003	
Bruno Martini	France	1	Montpellier	1	2003	
Andrej Golic	France	1	Montpellier	1	2003	
Cédric Burdet	France	1	Montpellier	1	2003	
Sobhi Sioud	Tunisia	1	Montpellier	1	2003	
Damien Scaccianocce	France	1	Montpellier	1	2003	
Mladen Bojinović	Serbia	1	Montpellier	1	2003	
Nenad Peruničić	Serbia	2	Bidasoa Irún, Magdeburg	2	1995, 2002	
Sune Agerschou	Denmark	1	Magdeburg	1	2002	
Bennet Wiegert	Germany	1	Magdeburg	1	2002	
Robert Lux	Germany	1	Magdeburg	1	2002	
Christian Schöne	Germany	1	Magdeburg	1	2002	
Guéric Kervadec	France	1	Magdeburg	1	2002	
Sven Liesegang	Germany	1	Magdeburg	1	2002	
Steffen Stiebler	Germany	1	Magdeburg	1	2002	
Christian Gaudin	France	1	Magdeburg	1	2002	
Joël Abati	France	1	Magdeburg	1	2002	
Oleg Kuleshov	Russia	1	Magdeburg	1	2002	
Mäuer Uwe	Germany	1	Magdeburg	1	2002	
Stefan Kretzschmar	Germany	1	Magdeburg	1	2002	
Fernando Barbeito	Spain	2	Barcelona, Portland San Antonio	3	1996, 1998, 2001	
Mikhail Yakimovich	Belarus	3	SKA Minsk, TEKA Santander, Portland San Antonio	5	1987, 1989, 1990, 1994, 2001	
Xabier Mikel Rekondo	Spain	2	TEKA Santander, Portland San Antonio	2	1994, 2001	
Oleg Kiselyov	Russia	2	Bidasoa Irún, Portland San Antonio	2	1995, 2001	
Jesús Olalla	Spain	2	Barcelona, Portland San Antonio	2	1996, 2001	
Oscar Mainer	Spain	1	Portland San Antonio	1	2001	
Alexandru Buligan	Spain	1	Portland San Antonio	1	2001	
Raúl Bartolomé	Spain	1	Portland San Antonio	1	2001	
Jackson Richardson	France	1	Portland San Antonio	1	2001	
Martín Ambrosio	Spain	1	Portland San Antonio	1	2001	
Tomas Svensson	Sweden	2	Bidasoa Irún, Barcelona	6	1995, 1996, 1997, 1998, 1999, 2000	
Enric Masip	Spain	1	Barcelona	6	1991, 1996, 1997, 1998, 1999, 2000	
Iñaki Urdangarín	Spain	1	Barcelona	6	1991, 1996, 1997, 1998, 1999, 2000	
Rafael Guijosa	Spain	1	Barcelona	5	1996, 1997, 1998, 1999, 2000	
Antonio Carlos Ortega	Spain	1	Barcelona	5	1996, 1997, 1998, 1999, 2000	
Patrik Ćavar	Croatia	2	RK Zagreb, Barcelona	5	1992, 1993 1998, 1999, 2000	
Demetrio Lozano	Spain	1	Barcelona	2	1999, 2000	
Christian Schwarzer	Germany	1	Barcelona	1	2000	
Alejandro Paredes	Spain	1	Barcelona	1	2000	
Mateo Garralda	Spain	3	TEKA Santander, Barcelona, Portland San Antonio	6	1994, 1996, 1997, 1998, 1999 et 2001	
Alexandru Dedu	Romania	1	Barcelona	1	1999	
Josep Espar	Spain	1	Barcelona	1	1999	
Joaquín Soler Teruel	Spain	1	Barcelona	2	1997, 1998	
David Barbeito	Spain	1	Barcelona	2	1996, 1997	
Israel Damont Luna	Spain	1	Barcelona	1	1997	
David Rodriguez	Spain	1	Bidasoa Irún	1	1995	
Javier de la Haza	Spain	1	Bidasoa Irún	1	1995	
Ángel Fernández	Italy	1	Bidasoa Irún	1	1995	
Fernando Fernández	Spain	1	Bidasoa Irún	1	1995	
Arman Rubino	Spain	1	Bidasoa Irún	1	1995	
Javier Barreto	Spain	1	Bidasoa Irún	1	1995	
Fernando Bolea	Spain	1	Bidasoa Irún	1	1995	
Iñaki Ordóñez	Spain	1	Bidasoa Irún	1	1995	
Mats Olsson	Sweden	1	TEKA Santander	1	1994	
Javier Cabanas	Spain	1	TEKA Santander	1	1994	
Yuri Nesterov	Russia	1	TEKA Santander	1	1994	
Juan Domínguez Munaiz	Spain	1	TEKA Santander	1	1994	
Chechu Villaldea	Spain	1	TEKA Santander	1	1994	
Jesús Fernández	Spain	1	TEKA Santander	1	1994	
Talant Duyshebaev	Spain	1	TEKA Santander	1	1994	
Alberto Urdiales	Spain	1	TEKA Santander	1	1994	
Juan Muñoz	Spain	1	TEKA Santander	1	1994	

== See also ==
- EHF Champions League
- European Cup and EHF Champions League records and statistics
