= 2009–10 EHF Champions League =

European handball tournament

EHF Champions League
- 2009–10

Tournament information
- Sport: Handball
- Location: Lanxess Arena (FINAL4)
- Dates: 4 September 2009–30 May 2010
- Teams: 32 (qualification stage); 24 (group stage); 16 (knockout stage)

Final positions
- Champions: (Germany) THW Kiel
- Runner-up: (Spain) FC Barcelona Borges

Tournament statistics
- Top scorer: (Czech Republic) Filip Jicha (119)
- Best player: (Czech Republic) Filip Jicha

The 2009–10 EHF Champions League was the 50th edition of Europe's premier club handball tournament and the seventeenth edition under the current EHF Champions League format. It was also the first edition under the new qualifying format. Ciudad Real were the defending champions. The final was played on 30 May 2010, at the Lanxess Arena, home ground of VfL Gummersbach and Kölner Haie, in Cologne, Germany.

== Draw ==
The draw for the group stage took place at the Liechtenstein Museum in Vienna on 24 June 2009. A total of 24 teams were drawn into four groups of six. Teams were divided into four pots, based on EHF coefficients. Clubs from the same pot or the same association cannot be drawn into the same group.

Each team played against each other in its group twice. The top two in each group proceeded to the knockout stage, and the third-placed teams entered the EHF Cup's Winners Cup Round of 32.

Key to colors in group tables
Top two places advance to the first knockout round
Third place enters the EHF Cup's Winner Cup at the round of 32
Fourth place is eliminated from continental competitions

== Qualification stage ==
=== Groups ===
Group 1
(North Macedonia) HC Vardar Skopje
(Belarus) HC Dinamo Minsk
(Turkey) Besiktas JK
(Montenegro) RK Budućnost Podgorica

Group 2
(Ukraine) ZTR Zaporizhzhia
(Greece) A.C. PAOK
(Cyprus) SPE Strovolos

Group 3
(Norway) Fyllingen Handball
(Austria) A1 Bregenz
(Serbia) RK Partizan Si&Si

Group 4
(Slovakia) Tatran Prešov
(Poland) Vive Targi Kielce
(Portugal) FC Porto Vitalis

Group 5
(Spain) CB Ademar León
(Germany) TBV Lemgo
(Slovenia) Celje
(Switzerland) Kadetten Schaffhausen

=== Group 1 ===
| Pos | Team | Pld | W | D | L | GF | GA | GD | Pts |
|---|---|---|---|---|---|---|---|---|---|
| 1 | (North Macedonia) HC Vardar Skopje | 3 | 3 | 0 | 0 | 102 | 82 | +20 | 6 |
| 2 | (Belarus) HC Dinamo Minsk | 3 | 2 | 0 | 1 | 91 | 86 | +5 | 4 |
| 3 | (Montenegro) HC Buducnost Podgorica | 3 | 1 | 0 | 2 | 86 | 98 | −12 | 2 |
| 4 | (Turkey) Besiktas JK | 3 | 0 | 0 | 3 | 83 | 96 | −13 | 0 |

| 4 September 2009, 18:00 | HC Vardar Skopje (North Macedonia) | 33 : 30 (19 : 14) | (Turkey) Besiktas JK |
| 4 September 2009, 20:00 | HC Dinamo Minsk (Belarus) | 35 : 27 (18 : 14) | (Montenegro) HC Buducnost Podgorica |
| 5 September 2009, 18:00 | Besiktas JK (Turkey) | 25 : 32 (10 : 19) | (Belarus) HC Dinamo Minsk |
| 5 September 2009, 20:00 | HC Budućnost Podgorica (Montenegro) | 28 : 35 (15 : 18) | (North Macedonia) HC Vardar Skopje |
| 6 September 2009, 18:00 | Besiktas JK (Turkey) | 28 : 31 (12 : 14) | (Montenegro) HC Budućnost Podgorica |
| 6 September 2009, 20:00 | HC Vardar Skopje (North Macedonia) | 34 : 24 (14 : 14) | (Belarus) HC Dinamo Minsk |

=== Group 2 ===
| Pos | Team | Pld | W | D | L | GF | GA | GD | Pts |
|---|---|---|---|---|---|---|---|---|---|
| 1 | (Greece) A.C. PAOK | 2 | 1 | 1 | 0 | 62 | 59 | +3 | 3 |
| 2 | (Ukraine) STR Saporischschja | 2 | 1 | 1 | 0 | 56 | 53 | +3 | 3 |
| 3 | (Cyprus) SPE Strovolos | 2 | 0 | 0 | 2 | 52 | 58 | −6 | 0 |

| 4 September 2009, 20:00 | A.C. PAOK (Greece) | 32 : 29 (16 : 12) | (Cyprus) SPE Strovolos |
| 5 September 2009, 20:00 | SPE Strovolos (Cyprus) | 23 : 26 (10 : 9) | (Ukraine) STR Saporischschja |
| 6 September 2009, 20:00 | STR Saporischschja (Ukraine) | 30 : 30 (13 : 15) | (Greece) A.C. PAOK |

=== Group 3 ===
| Pos | Team | Pld | W | D | L | GF | GA | GD | Pts |
|---|---|---|---|---|---|---|---|---|---|
| 1 | (Norway) Fyllingen Handball | 2 | 1 | 1 | 0 | 63 | 59 | +4 | 3 |
| 2 | (Austria) A1 Bregenz | 2 | 1 | 0 | 1 | 64 | 55 | +9 | 2 |
| 3 | (Serbia) RK Partizan Si&Si | 2 | 0 | 1 | 1 | 48 | 61 | −13 | 1 |

| 4 September 2009, 19:00 | RK Partizan Si&Si (Serbia) | 28 : 28 (16 : 14) | (Norway) Fyllingen Handball |
| 5 September 2009, 16:00 | A1 Bregenz (Austria) | 33 : 20 (15 : 10) | (Serbia) RK Partizan Si&Si |
| 6 September 2009, 16:00 | Fyllingen Handball (Norway) | 35 : 31 (21 : 14) | (Austria) A1 Bregenz |

=== Group 4 ===
| Pos | Team | Pld | W | D | L | GF | GA | GD | Pts |
|---|---|---|---|---|---|---|---|---|---|
| 1 | (Poland) Vive Targi Kielce | 2 | 2 | 0 | 0 | 70 | 54 | +16 | 4 |
| 2 | (Slovakia) Tatran Prešov | 2 | 1 | 0 | 1 | 64 | 68 | −4 | 2 |
| 3 | (Portugal) FC Porto Vitalis | 2 | 0 | 0 | 2 | 53 | 65 | −12 | 0 |

| 4 September 2009, 19:30 | Vive Targi Kielce (Poland) | 32 : 23 (14 : 9) | (Portugal) FC Porto Vitalis |
| 5 September 2009, 18:30 | FC Porto Vitalis (Portugal) | 30 : 33 (11 : 15) | (Slovakia) Tatran Prešov |
| 6 September 2009, 14:15 | Tatran Prešov (Slovakia) | 31 : 38 (15 : 21) | (Poland) Vive Targi Kielce |

=== Group 5 ===
| Pos | Team | Pld | W | D | L | GF | GA | GD | Pts |
|---|---|---|---|---|---|---|---|---|---|
| 1 | (Spain) Ademar León | 3 | 2 | 1 | 0 | 84 | 73 | +11 | 5 |
| 2 | (Switzerland) Kadetten Schaffhausen | 3 | 2 | 1 | 0 | 88 | 83 | +5 | 5 |
| 3 | (Slovenia) Celje | 3 | 1 | 0 | 2 | 80 | 84 | −4 | 2 |
| 4 | (Germany) TBV Lemgo | 3 | 0 | 0 | 3 | 77 | 89 | −12 | 0 |

| 4 September 2009, 18:45 | TBV Lemgo (Germany) | 29 : 30 (14 : 13) | (Switzerland) Kadetten Schaffhausen |
| 4 September 2009, 20:45 | Ademar León (Spain) | 26 : 25 (12 : 12) | (Slovenia) Celje |
| 5 September 2009, 18:45 | Kadetten Schaffhausen (Switzerland) | 27 : 27 (15 : 14) | (Spain) Ademar León |
| 5 September 2009, 20:45 | Celje (Slovenia) | 28 : 27 (13 : 12) | (Germany) TBV Lemgo |
| 6 September 2009, 16:30 | Celje (Slovenia) | 27 : 31 (12 : 13) | (Switzerland) Kadetten Schaffhausen |
| 6 September 2009, 18:30 | Ademar León (Spain) | 31 : 21 (17 : 10) | (Germany) TBV Lemgo |

== Group stage ==
=== Groups ===
Group A
(Russia) Chekhovskiye Medvedi
(France) Montpellier HB
(Hungary) SC Pick Szeged
(Spain) BM Valladolid
(Romania) HCM Constanța
(Greece) A.C. PAOK

Group B
(Hungary) MKB Veszprém
(Slovenia) Gorenje
(France) Chambéry Savoie
(Germany) Rhein-Neckar Löwen
(Bosnia and Herzegovina) RK Bosna Sarajevo
(Poland) Vive Targi Kielce

Group C
(Spain) BM Ciudad Real
HC Croatia Zagreb
(Germany) HSV Hamburg
(Denmark) FCK Handbold
(Sweden) Alingsas HK
(Norway) Fyllingen Handball

Group D
(Germany) THW Kiel
(Denmark) KIF Kolding
(Spain) FC Barcelona Borges
(Spain) Ademar León
(Switzerland) ZMC Amicitia Zürich
(North Macedonia) HC Vardar Skopje

=== Group A ===
| Pos | Team | Pld | W | D | L | GF | GA | GD | Pts |
|---|---|---|---|---|---|---|---|---|---|
| 1 | (France) Montpellier HB | 10 | 8 | 1 | 1 | 330 | 259 | +71 | 17 |
| 2 | (Russia) Chekhovskiye Medvedi | 10 | 6 | 2 | 2 | 344 | 282 | +62 | 14 |
| 3 | (Spain) BM Valladolid | 10 | 4 | 4 | 2 | 301 | 279 | +22 | 12 |
| 4 | (Romania) HCM Constanța | 10 | 4 | 1 | 5 | 285 | 301 | −16 | 9 |
| 5 | (Hungary) Pick Szeged | 10 | 2 | 2 | 6 | 287 | 307 | −20 | 6 |
| 6 | (Greece) A.C. PAOK | 10 | 1 | 0 | 9 | 236 | 355 | −119 | 2 |

| 30 September 2009, 19:00 | HCM Constanța (Romania) | 23 : 26 (10 : 14) | (Spain) BM Valladolid |
| 3 October 2009, 17:15 | Pick Szeged (Hungary) | 32 : 32 (15 : 16) | (Russia) Chekhovskiye Medvedi |
| 4 October 2009, 17:00 | Montpellier HB (France) | 46 : 20 (20 : 8) | (Greece) A.C. PAOK |
| 8 October 2009, 19:00 | HCM Constanța (Romania) | 37 : 33 (17 : 18) | (France) Montpellier HB |
| 10 October 2009, 17:15 | Pick Szeged (Hungary) | 27 : 24 (15 : 13) | (Greece) A.C. PAOK |
| 11 October 2009, 17:30 | BM Valladolid (Spain) | 34 : 34 (17 : 19) | (Russia) Chekhovskiye Medvedi |
| 14 October 2009, 19:00 | HCM Constanța (Romania) | 32 : 30 (17 : 16) | (Hungary) Pick Szeged |
| 15 October 2009, 19:30 | Chekhovskiye Medvedi (Russia) | 37 : 25 (18 : 9) | (Greece) A.C. PAOK |
| 18 October 2009, 19:00 | BM Valladolid (Spain) | 21 : 26 (9 : 9) | (France) Montpellier HB |
| 4 November 2009, 20:00 | A.C. PAOK (Greece) | 26 : 30 (12 : 16) | (Romania) HCM Constanța |
| 8 November 2009, 16:15 | Pick Szeged (Hungary) | 23 : 30 (12 : 15) | (Spain) BM Valladolid |
| 8 November 2009, 17:00 | Montpellier HB (France) | 33 : 28 (19 : 14) | (Russia) Chekhovskiye Medvedi |
| 11 November 2009, 20:00 | A.C. PAOK (Greece) | 27 : 37 (11 : 23) | (Spain) BM Valladolid |
| 15 November 2009, 17:00 | Montpellier HB (France) | 30 : 23 (14 : 9) | (Hungary) Pick Szeged |
| 15 November 2009, 19:00 | HCM Constanța (Romania) | 22 : 28 (11 : 14) | (Russia) Chekhovskiye Medvedi |
| 19 November 2009, 19:00 | Chekhovskiye Medvedi (Russia) | 37 : 32 (17 : 19) | (Romania) HCM Constanța |
| 21 November 2009, 17:30 | BM Valladolid (Spain) | 38 : 19 (16 : 9) | (Greece) A.C. PAOK |
| 22 November 2009, 17:15 | Pick Szeged (Hungary) | 26 : 33 (15 : 16) | (France) Montpellier HB |
| 10 February 2010, 20:00 | A.C. PAOK (Greece) | 27 : 26 (17 : 17) | (Hungary) Pick Szeged |
| 10 February 2010, 20:30 | Montpellier HB (France) | 37 : 24 (18 : 9) | (Romania) HCM Constanța |
| 11 February 2010, 19:00 | Chekhovskiye Medvedi (Russia) | 36 : 24 (16 : 12) | (Spain) BM Valladolid |
| 17 February 2010, 20:00 | A.C. PAOK (Greece) | 23 : 34 (10 : 19) | (France) Montpellier HB |
| 20 February 2010, 17:00 | Chekhovskiye Medvedi (Russia) | 39 : 30 (20 : 12) | (Hungary) Pick Szeged |
| 20 February 2010, 18:00 | BM Valladolid (Spain) | 26 : 26 (15 : 11) | (Romania) HCM Constanța |
| 25 February 2010, 19:00 | Chekhovskiye Medvedi (Russia) | 28 : 28 (11 : 16) | (France) Montpellier HB |
| 27 February 2010, 16:15 | HCM Constanța (Romania) | 34 : 23 (14 : 9) | (Greece) A.C. PAOK |
| 27 February 2010, 19:00 | BM Valladolid (Spain) | 35 : 35 (13 : 19) | (Hungary) Pick Szeged |
| 3 March 2010, 20:00 | A.C. PAOK (Greece) | 22 : 46 (12 : 24) | (Russia) Chekhovskiye Medvedi |
| 7 March 2010, 17:00 | Montpellier HB (France) | 30 : 30 (15 : 16) | (Spain) BM Valladolid |
| 7 March 2010, 17:15 | Pick Szeged (Hungary) | 35 : 25 (14 : 17) | (Romania) HCM Constanța |

=== Group B ===
| Pos | Team | Pld | W | D | L | GF | GA | GD | Pts |
|---|---|---|---|---|---|---|---|---|---|
| 1 | (Hungary) MKB Veszprém | 10 | 9 | 0 | 1 | 305 | 252 | +53 | 18 |
| 2 | (Germany) Rhein-Neckar Löwen | 10 | 7 | 2 | 1 | 325 | 286 | +39 | 16 |
| 3 | (Poland) Vive Targi Kielce | 10 | 4 | 1 | 5 | 291 | 287 | +4 | 9 |
| 4 | (Slovenia) RK Velenje | 10 | 3 | 1 | 6 | 281 | 298 | −17 | 7 |
| 5 | (France) Chambéry Savoie HB | 10 | 2 | 1 | 7 | 248 | 282 | −34 | 5 |
| 6 | (Bosnia and Herzegovina) HC Bosna Sarajevo | 10 | 2 | 1 | 7 | 249 | 294 | −45 | 5 |

| 3 October 2009, 17:30 | HC Bosna Sarajevo (Bosnia and Herzegovina) | 24 : 23 (13 : 12) | (France) Chambéry Savoie HB |
| 3 October 2009, 19:20 | Vive Targi Kielce (Poland) | 23 : 21 (9 : 13) | (Slovenia) RK Velenje |
| 4 October 2009, 16:30 | Rhein-Neckar Löwen (Germany) | 32 : 29 (17 : 14) | (Hungary) MKB Veszprém |
| 8 October 2009, 19:15 | Rhein-Neckar Löwen (Germany) | 29 : 29 (17 : 15) | (Poland) Vive Targi Kielce |
| 11 October 2009, 17:30 | Chambéry Savoie HB (France) | 19 : 29 (10 : 16) | (Hungary) MKB Veszprém |
| 11 October 2009, 18:00 | RK Velenje (Slovenia) | 30 : 29 (15 : 17) | (Bosnia and Herzegovina) HC Bosna Sarajevo |
| 17 October 2009, 17:15 | MKB Veszprém (Hungary) | 33 : 26 (16 : 11) | (Poland) Vive Targi Kielce |
| 18 October 2009, 15:30 | Chambéry Savoie HB (France) | 28 : 24 (14 : 9) | (Slovenia) RK Velenje |
| 18 October 2009, 15:30 | HC Bosna Sarajevo (Bosnia and Herzegovina) | 24 : 39 (10 : 20) | (Germany) Rhein-Neckar Löwen |
| 5 November 2009, 19:00 | Rhein-Neckar Löwen (Germany) | 31 : 31 (16 : 13) | (France) Chambéry Savoie HB |
| 7 November 2009, 18:00 | Vive Targi Kielce (Poland) | 34 : 30 (15 : 15) | (Bosnia and Herzegovina) HC Bosna Sarajevo |
| 8 November 2009, 18:00 | RK Velenje (Slovenia) | 27 : 28 (14 : 13) | (Hungary) MKB Veszprém |
| 11 November 2009, 19:00 | Rhein-Neckar Löwen (Germany) | 33 : 30 (17 : 15) | (Slovenia) RK Velenje |
| 14 November 2009, 17:15 | MKB Veszprém (Hungary) | 35 : 18 (22 : 7) | (Bosnia and Herzegovina) HC Bosna Sarajevo |
| 14 November 2009, 18:00 | KS Vive Kielce (Poland) | 31 : 22 (14 : 12) | (France) Chambéry Savoie HB |
| 19 November 2009, 20:30 | Chambéry Savoie HB (France) | 24 : 31 (15 : 14) | (Poland) KS Vive Kielce |
| 21 November 2009, 17:30 | HC Bosna Sarajevo (Bosnia and Herzegovina) | 20 : 24 (7 : 13) | (Hungary) MKB Veszprém |
| 22 November 2009, 15:30 | RK Velenje (Slovenia) | 29 : 37 (12 : 19) | (Germany) Rhein-Neckar Löwen |
| 13 February 2010, 16:00 | KS Vive Kielce (Poland) | 32 : 35 (19 : 15) | (Germany) Rhein-Neckar Löwen |
| 13 February 2010, 17:15 | MKB Veszprém (Hungary) | 31 : 26 (19 : 13) | (France) Chambéry Savoie HB |
| 13 February 2010, 17:30 | HC Bosna Sarajevo (Bosnia and Herzegovina) | 31 : 31 (17 : 15) | (Slovenia) RK Velenje |
| 17 February 2010, 17:00 | RK Velenje (Slovenia) | 36 : 35 (17 : 17) | (Poland) KS Vive Kielce |
| 21 February 2010, 15:00 | MKB Veszprém (Hungary) | 34 : 30 (17 : 12) | (Germany) Rhein-Neckar Löwen |
| 21 February 2010, 17:00 | Chambéry Savoie HB (France) | 27 : 24 (13 : 10) | (Bosnia and Herzegovina) HC Bosna Sarajevo |
| 27 February 2010, 17:15 | MKB Veszprém (Hungary) | 30 : 25 (15 : 11) | (Slovenia) RK Velenje |
| 27 February 2010, 17:30 | HC Bosna Sarajevo (Bosnia and Herzegovina) | 25 : 21 (9 : 10) | (Poland) KS Vive Kielce |
| 28 February 2010, 17:00 | Chambéry Savoie HB (France) | 24 : 29 (13 : 12) | (Germany) Rhein-Neckar Löwen |
| 6 March 2010, 16:00 | KS Vive Kielce (Poland) | 29 : 32 (14 : 14) | (Hungary) MKB Veszprém |
| 6 March 2010, 18:15 | Rhein-Neckar Löwen (Germany) | 30 : 24 (13 : 11) | (Bosnia and Herzegovina) HC Bosna Sarajevo |
| 6 March 2010, 20:15 | RK Velenje (Slovenia) | 28 : 24 (18 : 11) | (France) Chambéry Savoie HB |

=== Group C ===
| Pos | Team | Pld | W | D | L | GF | GA | GD | Pts |
|---|---|---|---|---|---|---|---|---|---|
| 1 | (Spain) BM Ciudad Real | 10 | 10 | 0 | 0 | 321 | 241 | +80 | 20 |
| 2 | (Germany) HSV Hamburg | 10 | 8 | 0 | 2 | 346 | 259 | +87 | 16 |
| 3 | HC Croatia Zagreb | 10 | 6 | 0 | 4 | 292 | 266 | +26 | 12 |
| 4 | (Denmark) FCK Handbold | 10 | 4 | 0 | 6 | 276 | 281 | −5 | 8 |
| 5 | (Sweden) Alingsas HK | 10 | 2 | 0 | 8 | 251 | 302 | −51 | 4 |
| 6 | (Norway) Fyllingen Handball | 10 | 0 | 0 | 10 | 214 | 351 | −137 | 0 |

| 3 October 2009, 16:15 | Fyllingen Handball (Norway) | 22 : 29 (9 : 15) | HC Croatia Zagreb |
| 3 October 2009, 17:00 | HSV Hamburg (Germany) | 35 : 25 (20 : 12) | (Sweden) Alingsas HK |
| 3 October 2009, 20:30 | BM Ciudad Real (Spain) | 34 : 22 (15 : 9) | (Denmark) FCK Handbold |
| 7 October 2009, 18:30 | HSV Hamburg (Germany) | 26 : 32 (13 : 15) | (Spain) BM Ciudad Real |
| 7 October 2009, 20:00 | HC Croatia Zagreb | 30 : 21 (17 : 9) | (Sweden) Alingsas HK |
| 11 October 2009, 15:50 | FCK Handbold (Denmark) | 35 : 21 (17 : 8) | (Norway) Fyllingen Handball |
| 17 October 2009, 16:10 | Alingsas HK (Sweden) | 21 : 33 (9 : 15) | (Denmark) FCK Handbold |
| 17 October 2009, 19:00 | BM Ciudad Real (Spain) | 40 : 24 (18 : 12) | (Norway) Fyllingen Handball |
| 18 October 2009, 17:30 | HSV Hamburg (Germany) | 35 : 26 (14 : 12) | HC Croatia Zagreb |
| 7 November 2009, 16:15 | Fyllingen Handball (Norway) | 26 : 28 (13 : 14) | (Sweden) Alingsas HK |
| 7 November 2009, 18:00 | HC Croatia Zagreb | 27 : 32 (12 : 15) | (Spain) BM Ciudad Real |
| 8 November 2009, 15:50 | FCK Handbold (Denmark) | 27 : 34 (16 : 20) | (Germany) HSV Hamburg |
| 14 November 2009, 16:10 | Alingsas HK (Sweden) | 24 : 26 (10 : 14) | (Spain) BM Ciudad Real |
| 14 November 2009, 16:15 | Fyllingen Handball (Norway) | 17 : 48 (10 : 25) | (Germany) HSV Hamburg |
| 15 November 2009, 15:50 | FCK Handbold (Denmark) | 28 : 29 (15 : 18) | HC Croatia Zagreb |
| 21 November 2009, 15:30 | Alingsas HK (Sweden) | 23 : 32 (10 : 16) | HC Croatia Zagreb |
| 21 November 2009, 18:15 | Fyllingen Handball (Norway) | 19 : 28 (11 : 15) | (Denmark) FCK Handbold |
| 22 November 2009, 17:30 | BM Ciudad Real (Spain) | 30 : 28 (14 : 12) | (Germany) HSV Hamburg |
| 11 February 2010, 20:15 | HSV Hamburg (Germany) | 37 : 21 (17 : 13) | (Norway) Fyllingen Handball |
| 13 February 2010, 16:30 | BM Ciudad Real (Spain) | 28 : 24 (14 : 10) | (Sweden) Alingsas HK |
| 13 February 2010, 18:00 | HC Croatia Zagreb | 31 : 22 (17 : 7) | (Denmark) FCK Handbold |
| 20 February 2010, 16:10 | Alingsas HK (Sweden) | 27 : 37 (13 : 17) | (Germany) HSV Hamburg |
| 20 February 2010, 18:00 | HC Croatia Zagreb | 35 : 23 (16 : 11) | (Norway) Fyllingen Handball |
| 21 February 2010, 15:50 | FCK Handbold (Denmark) | 25 : 33 (10 : 15) | (Spain) BM Ciudad Real |
| 27 February 2010, 16:10 | Alingsas HK (Sweden) | 32 : 24 (16 : 9) | (Norway) Fyllingen Handball |
| 27 February 2010, 16:40 | HSV Hamburg (Germany) | 33 : 25 (14 : 15) | (Denmark) FCK Handbold |
| 28 February 2010, 18:00 | HC Croatia Zagreb | 24 : 27 (11 : 15) | (Spain) BM Ciudad Real |
| 6 March 2010, 16:00 | Fyllingen Handball (Norway) | 17 : 39 (10 : 23) | (Spain) BM Ciudad Real |
| 7 March 2010, 15:50 | FCK Handbold (Denmark) | 31 : 26 (16 : 11) | (Sweden) Alingsas HK |
| 7 March 2010, 18:00 | HC Croatia Zagreb | 29 : 33 (14 : 19) | (Germany) HSV Hamburg |

=== Group D ===
| Pos | Team | Pld | W | D | L | GF | GA | GD | Pts |
|---|---|---|---|---|---|---|---|---|---|
| 1 | (Germany) THW Kiel | 10 | 8 | 1 | 1 | 347 | 271 | +76 | 17 |
| 2 | (Spain) FC Barcelona Borges | 10 | 8 | 1 | 1 | 341 | 279 | +62 | 17 |
| 3 | (Spain) Ademar León | 10 | 5 | 1 | 4 | 291 | 293 | −2 | 11 |
| 4 | (Denmark) KIF Kolding | 10 | 4 | 3 | 3 | 287 | 288 | −1 | 11 |
| 5 | (North Macedonia) HC Vardar Skopje | 10 | 1 | 1 | 8 | 253 | 316 | −63 | 3 |
| 6 | (Switzerland) ZMC Amicitia Zürich | 10 | 0 | 1 | 9 | 254 | 326 | −72 | 1 |

| 3 October 2009, 18:15 | ZMC Amicitia Zürich (Switzerland) | 27 : 39 (15 : 15) | (Spain) FC Barcelona Borges |
| 3 October 2009, 18:30 | HC Vardar Skopje (North Macedonia) | 25 : 32 (10 : 13) | (Denmark) KIF Kolding |
| 4 October 2009, 18:15 | THW Kiel (Germany) | 35 : 32 (17 : 15) | (Spain) Ademar León |
| 10 October 2009, 16:15 | KIF Kolding (Denmark) | 35 : 27 (17 : 13) | (Switzerland) ZMC Amicitia Zürich |
| 10 October 2009, 17:30 | Ademar León (Spain) | 37 : 28 (17 : 13) | (North Macedonia) HC Vardar Skopje |
| 11 October 2009, 17:15 | FC Barcelona Borges (Spain) | 27 : 30 (16 : 20) | (Germany) THW Kiel |
| 17 October 2009, 17:00 | FC Barcelona Borges (Spain) | 46 : 36 (23 : 19) | (Denmark) KIF Kolding |
| 17 October 2009, 17:45 | HC Vardar Skopje (North Macedonia) | 23 : 33 (12 : 14) | (Germany) THW Kiel |
| 17 October 2009, 18:15 | ZMC Amicitia Zürich (Switzerland) | 27 : 30 (14 : 15) | (Spain) Ademar León |
| 7 November 2009, 16:15 | KIF Kolding (Denmark) | 31 : 31 (13 : 13) | (Germany) THW Kiel |
| 7 November 2009, 16:15 | FC Barcelona Borges (Spain) | 28 : 22 (13 : 10) | (Spain) Ademar León |
| 7 November 2009, 18:30 | HC Vardar Skopje (North Macedonia) | 22 : 22 (14 : 10) | (Switzerland) ZMC Amicitia Zürich |
| 14 November 2009, 17:30 | Ademar León (Spain) | 30 : 30 (18 : 15) | (Denmark) KIF Kolding |
| 14 November 2009, 18:30 | HC Vardar Skopje (North Macedonia) | 28 : 35 (17 : 16) | (Spain) FC Barcelona Borges |
| 15 November 2009, 17:30 | THW Kiel (Germany) | 42 : 24 (18 : 12) | (Switzerland) ZMC Amicitia Zürich |
| 21 November 2009, 16:15 | FC Barcelona Borges (Spain) | 35 : 28 (15 : 13) | (North Macedonia) HC Vardar Skopje |
| 21 November 2009, 18:15 | ZMC Amicitia Zürich (Switzerland) | 26 : 34 (12 : 19) | (Germany) THW Kiel |
| 22 November 2009, 14:00 | KIF Kolding (Denmark) | 21 : 22 (10 : 11) | (Spain) Ademar León |
| 13 February 2010, 18:15 | ZMC Amicitia Zürich (Switzerland) | 23 : 26 (9 : 10) | (Denmark) KIF Kolding |
| 13 February 2010, 18:30 | HC Vardar Skopje (North Macedonia) | 24 : 31 (11 : 18) | (Spain) Ademar León |
| 14 February 2010, 16:30 | THW Kiel (Germany) | 30 : 32 (15 : 17) | (Spain) FC Barcelona Borges |
| 20 February 2010, 16:15 | FC Barcelona Borges (Spain) | 37 : 26 (18 : 11) | (Switzerland) ZMC Amicitia Zürich |
| 20 February 2010, 16:15 | KIF Kolding (Denmark) | 28 : 21 (15 : 9) | (North Macedonia) HC Vardar Skopje |
| 21 February 2010, 17:00 | Ademar León (Spain) | 30 : 35 (17 : 18) | (Germany) THW Kiel |
| 27 February 2010, 15:00 | THW Kiel (Germany) | 38 : 23 (20 : 10) | (Denmark) KIF Kolding |
| 27 February 2010, 18:15 | ZMC Amicitia Zürich (Switzerland) | 24 : 31 (18 : 15) | (North Macedonia) HC Vardar Skopje |
| 28 February 2010, 18:00 | Ademar León (Spain) | 27 : 37 (12 : 20) | (Spain) FC Barcelona Borges |
| 6 March 2010, 16:15 | KIF Kolding (Denmark) | 25 : 25 (10 : 12) | (Spain) FC Barcelona Borges |
| 6 March 2010, 18:00 | Ademar León (Spain) | 30 : 28 (16 : 11) | (Switzerland) ZMC Amicitia Zürich |
| 7 March 2010, 15:45 | THW Kiel (Germany) | 39 : 23 (19 : 13) | (North Macedonia) HC Vardar Skopje |

== Knockout stage ==
=== 1/8 Final ===
The Last 16 fixtures of the 2009–10 EHF Men's Champions League were drawn in the EHF Headquarters on 9 March 2010.
The four group winners were drawn against the teams ranked fourth in the Group Phase. The second ranked teams will meet teams ranked third.

| Team 1 | Team 2 | 1st leg | 2nd leg | Total |
|---|---|---|---|---|
| (Spain) Ademar León | (Russia) Chekhovskiye Medvedi | 28 March 2010, 19:30 | 01.04.2010, 19:00 | 61 : 66 |
| (Spain) Ademar León | (Russia) Chekhovskiye Medvedi | 36 : 37 (20 : 18) | 25 : 29 (14 : 15) | 61 : 66 |
| (Poland) Vive Targi Kielce | (Germany) HSV Hamburg | 27 March 2010, 19:30 | 03.04.2010, 15:30 | 54 : 57 |
| (Poland) Vive Targi Kielce | (Germany) HSV Hamburg | 24 : 30 (15 : 17) | 30 : 27 (16 : 15) | 54 : 57 |
| HC Croatia Zagreb | (Spain) FC Barcelona Borges | 27 March 2010, 18:00 | 03.04.2010, 16:15 | 59 : 69 |
| HC Croatia Zagreb | (Spain) FC Barcelona Borges | 26 : 33 (12 : 17) | 33 : 36 (18 : 17) | 59 : 69 |
| (Romania) HCM Constanța | (Hungary) MKB Veszprém | 28 March 2010, 16:15 | 03.04.2010, 17:15 | 49 : 54 |
| (Romania) HCM Constanța | (Hungary) MKB Veszprém | 23 : 27 (9 : 12) | 26 : 27 (14 : 9) | 49 : 54 |
| (Denmark) KIF Kolding | (France) Montpellier HB | 27 March 2010, 14:00 | 03.04.2010, 17:30 | 49 : 54 |
| (Denmark) KIF Kolding | (France) Montpellier HB | 26 : 26 (10 : 13) | 23 : 28 (14 : 12) | 49 : 54 |
| (Slovenia) Gorenje | (Spain) Ciudad Real | 28 March 2010, 18:30 | 03.04.2010, 18:00 | 54 : 66 |
| (Slovenia) Gorenje | (Spain) Ciudad Real | 23 : 31 (9 : 14) | 31 : 35 (15 : 18) | 54 : 66 |
| (Spain) BM Valladolid | (Germany) Rhein-Neckar Löwen | 27 March 2010, 17:00 | 4 April 2010, 17:15 | 62 : 67 |
| (Spain) BM Valladolid | (Germany) Rhein-Neckar Löwen | 29 : 30 (14 : 14) | 33 : 37 (15 : 21) | 62 : 67 |
| (Denmark) FCK Handbold | (Germany) THW Kiel | 28 March 2010, 15:50 | 4 April 2010, 19:00 | 54 : 62 |
| (Denmark) FCK Handbold | (Germany) THW Kiel | 31 : 33 (13 : 16) | 23 : 29 (12 : 13) | 54 : 62 |

=== 1/4 Final ===
The Quarterfinals of the EHF Men's Champions League were drawn in the EHF Headquarters on 6 April 2010.

| Team 1 | Team 2 | 1st leg | 2nd leg | Total |
|---|---|---|---|---|
| (Germany) HSV Hamburg | (Spain) BM Ciudad Real | 25 April 2010, 17:15 | 02 May 2010, 19:00 | 53 : 57 |
| (Germany) HSV Hamburg | (Spain) BM Ciudad Real | 26 : 22 (11 : 8) | 27 : 35 (11 : 18) | 53 : 57 |
| (Germany) Rhein-Neckar Löwen | (Germany) THW Kiel | 25 April 2010, 19:00 | 02 May 2010, 17:15 | 58 : 60 |
| (Germany) Rhein-Neckar Löwen | (Germany) THW Kiel | 28 : 29 (13 : 15) | 30 : 31 (13 : 12) | 58 : 60 |
| (Russia) Chekhovskiye Medvedi | (France) Montpellier HB | 28 April 2010, 17:00 | 01 May 2010, 19:00 | 64 : 63 |
| (Russia) Chekhovskiye Medvedi | (France) Montpellier HB | 32 : 27 (18 : 13) | 32 : 36 (12 : 14) | 64 : 63 |
| (Spain) FC Barcelona Borges | (Hungary) Veszprém KC | 25 April 2010, 16:45 | 01 May 2010, 16:20 | 67 : 60 |
| (Spain) FC Barcelona Borges | (Hungary) Veszprém KC | 33 : 27 (17 : 15) | 34 : 33 (15 : 19) | 67 : 60 |

=== Semifinals ===
| Date | Team 1 | Team 2 | Total |
|---|---|---|---|
| 29 May 2010, 15:30 | (Russia) Chekhovskiye Medvedi | (Spain) FC Barcelona Borges | 27 : 34 (11 : 17) |
| 29 May 2010, 18:00 | (Spain) BM Ciudad Real | (Germany) THW Kiel | 27 : 29 (15 : 12) |

=== 3/4 Match ===
| Date | Team 1 | Team 2 | Total |
|---|---|---|---|
| 30 May 2010, 15:30 | (Russia) Chekhovskiye Medvedi | (Spain) BM Ciudad Real | 28 : 36 (15 : 19) |

=== Final ===
| Date | Team 1 | Team 2 | Total |
|---|---|---|---|
| 30 May 2010, 18:00 | (Spain) FC Barcelona Borges | (Germany) THW Kiel | 34 : 36 (20 : 17) |

== Top scorers ==
| Rank | Name | Team | Goals |
|---|---|---|---|
| 1 | (Czech Republic) Filip Jicha | (Germany) THW Kiel | 119 |
| 2 | (Spain) Juan Garcia Lorenzana | (Spain) FC Barcelona Borges | 97 |
| 3 | (Romania) Laurenţiu Toma | (Romania) HCM Constanța | 90 |
| 4 | (North Macedonia) Kiril Lazarov | HC Croatia Zagreb | 83 |
| 5 | (Denmark) Hans Lindberg | (Germany) HSV Hamburg | 82 |
| 6 | (Serbia) Rastko Stojkovic | (Poland) Vive Targi Kielce | 80 |
| 7 | (Spain) Victor Tomas Gonzalez | (Spain) FC Barcelona Borges | 77 |
| 8 | (Slovenia) Vid Kavticnik | (France) Montpellier HB | 76 |
| 9 | (Russia) Vasily Filippov | (Russia) Chekhovskiye Medvedi | 71 |
| 9 | (Hungary) Gergő Iváncsik | (Hungary) MKB Veszprém | 71 |
| 9 | (Russia) Alexey Rastvortsev | (Russia) Chekhovskiye Medvedi | 71 |
