= 2003–04 EHF Champions League =

European handball tournament

EHF Champions League
- 2003–04

Tournament information
- Sport: Handball
- Dates: 12 September 2003–24 April 2004
- Administrator: EHF
- Participants: 37

Final positions
- Champions: (Slovenia) RK Celje
- Runner-up: (Germany) SG Flensburg-Handewitt

Tournament statistics
- Top scorer: (Slovenia) Siarhei Rutenka (95)

The 2003–04 EHF Champions League was the 44th edition of Europe's premier club handball tournament. Montpellier Handball were the reigning champions.

RK Celje won their first ever title, beating SG Flensburg-Handewitt in the final. This was the first time a Slovenian team won the tournament.

== Qualification stage ==
	Agg.		1st match	2nd match
HC Hard (Austria)	61–43	(Belarus) Arkatron Minsk	35–17	26–26
Fiqas Aalsmeer (Netherlands)	57–64	(Bosnia and Herzegovina) RK Bosna Sarajevo	21–29	36–35
Granitas Kaunas (Lithuania)	46–58	(Greece) Filippos Verias	26–33	20–25
Haukar Hafnarfjörður (Iceland)	57–47	(Portugal) CD de São Bernardo-Aveiro	37–23	20–24
Handballclub Tongeren (Belgium)	46–61	(Slovakia) MŠK Považská Bystrica	25–26	21–35

== Group stage ==
=== Group A ===
Team	Pld	W	D	L	GF	GA	GD	Pts	LEM	BMC	ZTR	CON
(Germany) TBV Lemgo	6	4	2	0	196	157	+39	10	—	34–29	27–27	41–22
(Spain) BM Ciudad Real	6	4	1	1	187	145	+42	9	34–34	—	24–15	38–14
(Ukraine) ZTR Zaporizhia	6	2	1	3	161	145	+16	5	22–28	25–30	—	31–24
(Italy) Conversano	6	0	0	6	118	215	−97	0	23–32	23–32	12–41	—

Source: EHF

=== Group B ===
Team	Pld	W	D	L	GF	GA	GD	Pts	SCM	BAR	HAU	VAR
(Germany) SC Magdeburg	6	5	0	1	192	176	+16	10	—	34–29	27–27	41–22
(Spain) FC Barcelona	6	4	1	1	203	152	+51	9	34–34	—	24–15	38–14
(Iceland) Haukar Hafnarfjörður	6	2	1	3	179	193	−14	5	22–28	25–30	—	31–24
(North Macedonia) Vardar Vatrost. Skopje	6	0	0	6	157	210	−53	0	23–32	23–32	12–41	—

Source: EHF

=== Group C ===
Team	Pld	W	D	L	GF	GA	GD	Pts	KIF	P67	PAR	ASK
(Denmark) KIF Kolding	6	4	1	1	204	172	+32	9	—	42–32	42–26	37–27
(Slovenia) Prule 67 Ljubljana	6	4	1	1	181	178	+3	9	31–25	—	29–29	31–28
(Serbia and Montenegro) Partizan	6	1	1	4	179	194	−15	3	30–31	32–33	—	35–30
(Turkey) ASKİ Ankara	6	1	1	4	163	183	−20	3	27–27	22–26	29–27	—

Source: EHF

=== Group D ===
Pos	Team	Pld	W	D	L	GF	GA	GD	Pts
1	(France) Montpellier HB	6	5	0	1	167	144	+23	15
2	(Spain) Ademar León	6	4	0	2	179	161	+18	12
3	(Russia) Chekhovskiye Medvedi	6	3	0	3	166	165	+1	9
4	(Austria) Alpla HC Hard	6	0	0	6	138	180	−42	0

Source: EHF

=== Group E ===
Pos	Team	Pld	W	D	L	GF	GA	GD	Pts
1	(Croatia) RK Zagreb	6	3	0	3	159	144	+15	9
2	(Hungary) SC Szeged	6	3	0	3	160	154	+6	9
3	(Norway) Sandefjord TIF	6	3	0	3	149	157	−8	9
4	(Greece) Filippos Verias	6	3	0	3	154	167	−13	9

=== Group F ===
Pos	Team	Pld	W	D	L	GF	GA	GD	Pts
1	(Slovenia) RK Celje	6	5	1	0	196	161	+35	16
2	(Germany) SG Flensburg-Handewitt	6	4	1	1	211	181	+30	13
3	(Sweden) Redbergslids IK	6	2	0	4	179	186	−7	6
4	(Slovakia) MŠK Považská Bystrica	6	0	0	6	163	221	−58	0

Source: EHF

=== Group G ===
Pos	Team	Pld	W	D	L	GF	GA	GD	Pts
1	(Hungary) KC Veszprém	6	6	0	0	197	156	+41	18
2	(Denmark) Skjern Håndbold	6	2	1	3	151	153	−2	7
3	(Poland) KS Kielce	6	2	1	3	159	177	−18	7
4	(Bosnia and Herzegovina) RK Bosna Sarajevo	6	1	0	5	151	172	−21	3

Source: EHF

=== Group H ===
Pos	Team	Pld	W	D	L	GF	GA	GD	Pts
1	(France) Chambéry Savoie HB	6	6	0	0	185	157	+28	18
2	(Switzerland) Pfadi Winterthur	6	2	1	3	192	178	+14	7
3	(Czech Republic) HC Baník Karviná	6	2	0	4	180	194	−14	6
4	(Croatia) RK Metković	6	1	1	4	156	184	−28	4

Source: EHF

== Round of 16 ==
Team #1	Team #2	1st match	2nd match	Agg.
(Spain) BM Ciudad Real	(France) Chambéry Savoie HB	36–28	33–32	69–60
(Denmark) Skjern Handball	(Germany) SC Magdeburg	30–25	24–34	54–59
(Spain) CBM Ademar León	(Slovenia) RK Celje	38–25	21–34	59–59^{*}
(Germany) SG Flensburg-Handewitt	(Denmark) Kolding KIF	34–29	33–20	67–49
(Hungary) SC Szeged	(France) Montpellier HB	29–22	26–27	55–49
(Switzerland) Pfadi Winterthur	(Croatia) RK Zagreb	32–29	24–32	56–61
(Slovenia) Prule 67 Ljubljana	(Germany) TBV Lemgo	28–28	27–32	55–60
(Spain) FC Barcelona	(Hungary) KC Veszprém	33–29	26–31	59–60

== Quarterfinals ==
Team #1	Team #2	1st match	2nd match	Agg.
(Germany) SG Flensburg-Handewitt	(Croatia) RK Zagreb	30–27	28–26	58–53
(Hungary) SC Szeged	(Germany) SC Magdeburg	30–31	24–28	54–59
(Slovenia) RK Celje	(Germany) TBV Lemgo	32–25	28–28	60–53
(Spain) BM Ciudad Real	(Hungary) KC Veszprém	33–24	28–25	61–49

== Semifinals ==
Team #1	Team #2	1st match	2nd match	Agg.
(Spain) BM Ciudad Real	(Slovenia) RK Celje	35–36	32–34	67–70
(Germany) SG Flensburg-Handewitt	(Germany) SC Magdeburg	30–20	26–36	56–56^{*}

== Finals ==
Team #1	Team #2	1st match	2nd match	Agg.
(Slovenia) RK Celje	(Germany) SG Flensburg-Handewitt	34–28	28–30	62–58
