= Arpad Sterbik =

Spanish handball player (born 1979)

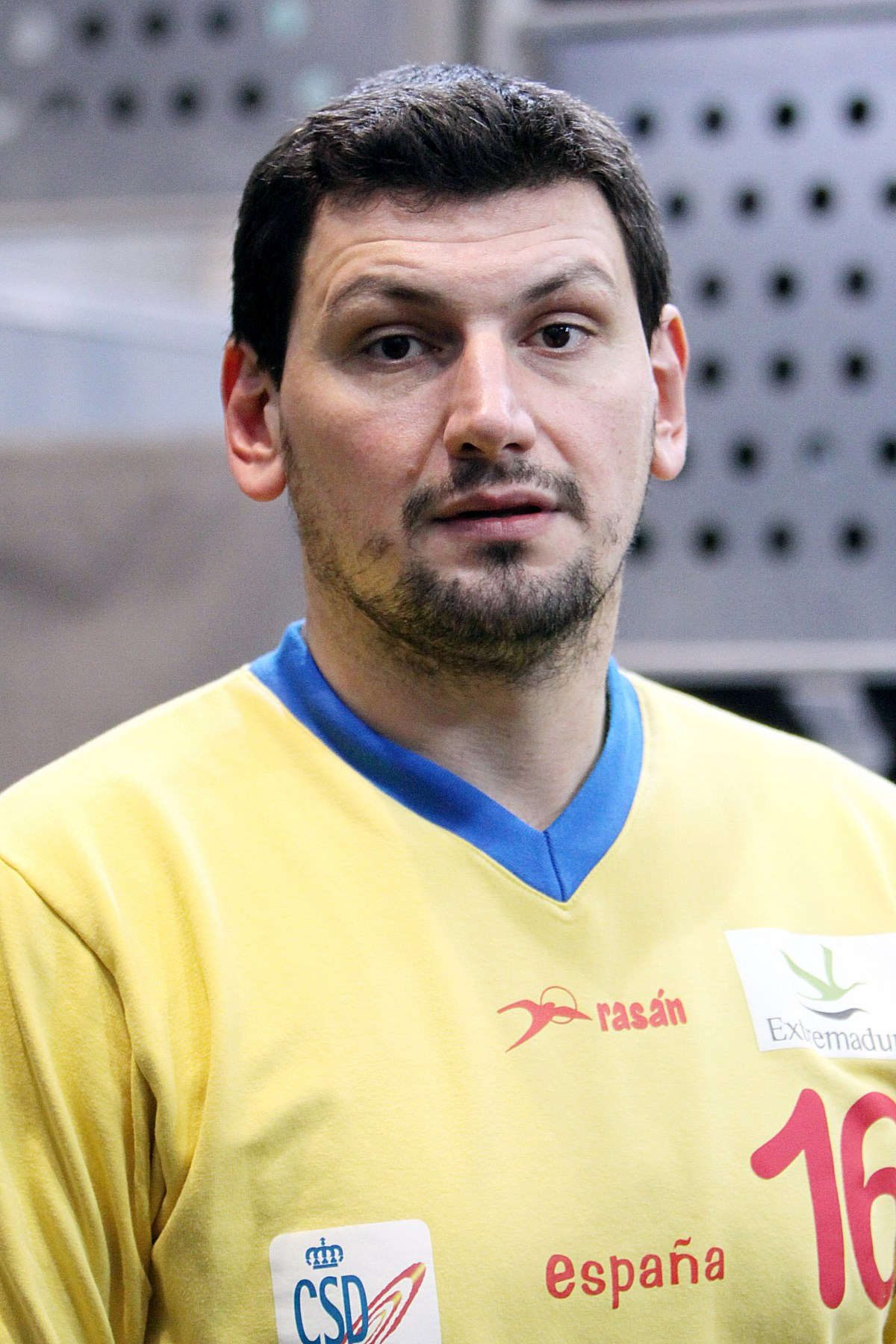
- Sterbik in 2010

Personal information
- Full name: Arpad Sterbik Capar
- Nationality: Serbian; Hungarian; Spanish
- Born: 20 November 1979 (age 46) Senta, SR Serbia, Yugoslavia
- Height: 2.00 m (6 ft 7 in)

Sport
- Sport: Handball
- Position: Goalkeeper

Senior clubs
- Years: Team
- –2001: RK Jugović
- 2001–2004: Fotex Veszprém
- 2004–2011: BM Ciudad Real
- 2011–2012: Atlético Madrid
- 2012–2014: FC Barcelona
- 2014–2018: RK Vardar
- 2018–2020: Telekom Veszprém
National team
Years	Team	Apps	(Gls)
1999–2006	FR Yugoslavia; Serbia and Montenegro	120	(0)
2008–2020	Spain	78	(0)

Teams managed
- 2020–: Telekom Veszprém (GK coach)
Medal record
Representing FR Yugoslavia
World Championship
Bronze medal – third place	1999 Egypt
Bronze medal – third place	2001 France
Representing Spain
World Championship
Gold medal – first place	2013 Spain
Bronze medal – third place	2011 Sweden
European Championship
Gold medal – first place	2018 Croatia
Silver medal – second place	2016 Poland

Arpad Sterbik Capar (Hungarian: Sterbik Árpád, pronounced [ˈʃtɛrbik ˈaːrpaːd]; Serbian: Арпад Штербик/Arpad Šterbik; born 20 November 1979) is a retired handball player who represented the national teams of Yugoslavia (later known as Serbia and Montenegro) and Spain.

Internationally he has represented FR Yugoslavia (Serbia and Montenegro) and Spain, winning a World Championship bronze medal and one gold. On club level, he has league and cup titles both in Hungary and Spain, and most notably he won the EHF Champions League, the premier continental club competition in Europe. His performances were acknowledged several times, having been named Hungarian Handballer of the Year in 2002 and IHF World Player of the Year in 2005.

== Career ==
Sterbik grew up by the nearby town of Ada. He began his career by RK Jugović, and moved to Hungary to play for Fotex KC Veszprém in 2001. Sterbik, as an ethnic Hungarian, was eligible for expedited birthright naturalization process for Hungarian diaspora as per Hungarian nationality law, which made him a domestic player; at the time Hungarian teams could only name 2 foreign players in their match squad. It also made him eligible represent Hungary at international competitions, however, he never made an international appearance for the country. Sterbik remained with Veszprém until 2004, during which period he won three Hungarian league and as many Hungarian cup titles. In 2002 he reached with Veszprém the EHF Champions League final, just to fell short against SC Magdeburg with an aggregate score of 48–51. In the same year he was voted Hungarian Handballer of the Year.

In 2004, he moved to Spanish side BM Ciudad Real and soon became one of the most prominent keepers in the Liga ASOBAL. While playing for Ciudad Real (2004–2011) and its successor Atlético Madrid (2011–2012), he was named the best goalkeeper of the league five times in a row (2006–2010) and in 2006 he also got the Liga ASOBAL MVP Award. Additionally, he was awarded the IHF World Player of the Year title by the International Handball Federation in 2005. Sterbik spent seven seasons by Ciudad Real and won four Spanish league and two Spanish cup titles. He went successful with Ciudad Real in the EHF Champions League as well, having won the title three times. In 2008, in his fourth season in Spain, Sterbik has gained Spanish citizenship and decided to represent Spain on international level.

In 2012, after eight successful seasons in Ciudad Real and Atlético Madrid, Sterbik switched to league rivals FC Barcelona Handbol, having signed a four-year contract with the Catalan team.

On 14 June 2014, Sterbik has agreed to join RK Vardar from Macedonia. With this club, Sterbik won 2 titles in two years in the Macedonian Handball League as well as 2 Cup titles. In addition, with RK Vardar, in season 2014–2015, he managed to enter the quarter final of the EHF Champions League and to be part of the top 8 handball teams in Europe. In the same year, they finished fourth in Gazprom's SEHA League. In April 2016, they won the second place in the Final 4 tournament of the SEHA League (lost the final against Veszprem with 26–28). Sterbik has earned many individual awards with RK Vardar too. He was selected in the dream-team of the SEHA League for 2015–16, and also, he was recognized several times as a best goalkeeper of particular rounds of the EHF Champions League.

On international level Sterbik played for Yugoslavia and Spain; he received bronze medals at the 1999 World Championships and at the 2001 World Championships with Yugoslavia, and added another World Championship bronze and a gold with Spain to his medals tally in 2011 and 2013, respectively.

== Personal life ==
Born in Senta, Serbia, at the time part of Yugoslavia, Sterbik is an ethnic Hungarian from Serbia who acquired Hungarian citizenship shortly after playing in Hungary and holds Spanish citizenship per post naturalization process.

Sterbik is married to Hungarian economist Mónika Horváth. The couple has twin children, Laura and Noel (b. 2010). Arpad's sister, Andrea Sterbik is also a professional handballer who plays for Hungarian top division club Kiskunhalas NKSE.

== Achievements ==
- EHF Challenge Cup:
  - Winner: 2001
- Nemzeti Bajnokság I:
  - Winner: 2002, 2003, 2004
- Magyar Kupa:
  - Winner: 2002, 2003, 2004
- Liga ASOBAL:
  - Winner: 2004, 2007, 2008, 2009, 2012, 2013, 2014
- Copa del Rey:
  - Winner: 2008, 2011, 2014
- EHF Champions League:
  - Winner: 2006, 2008, 2009, 2017
- Macedonian Handball Super League
  - Winner: 2014–15, 2015–16, 2016–17, 2017–18
- Macedonian Handball Cup
  - Winner: 2015, 2016, 2017, 2018
- Macedonian Handball Super Cup
  - Winner: 2017, 2018, 2019, 2023
- EHF Champions League
  - Winner:
- SEHA League
  - Winner: 2016–17, 2017–18, 2018–19
- IHF Super Globe
  - Third placed: 2017

== Individual awards ==
- Hungarian Handballer of the Year: 2002
- IHF World Player of the Year: 2005
- Liga ASOBAL MVP: 2006
- Liga ASOBAL Goalkeeper of the Year: 2006, 2007, 2008, 2009, 2010
- European Handball Federation Hall of Fame in 2023.
