= 2005–06 EHF Champions League =

European handball tournament

Tournament details
- Dates: 10 September 2004 – 7 May 2005
- Teams: 39
- Defending champions: FC Barcelona

Final positions
- Champions: BM Ciudad Real
- Runners-up: Portland San Antonio
- Semifinalists: MKB Veszprém KC; SG Flensburg-Handewitt

Tournament statistics
- Scoring leader: Kiril Lazarov (85 goals)

Official website
- EHF site

The EHF Champions League 2005–06 was the 2005–2006 edition of the EHF Champions League who is managed by EHF. FC Barcelona were the reigning champions.

BM Ciudad Real won the title beating Portland San Antonio in the final.

== Qualification round ==
Team 1	Agg.	Team 2	1st leg	2nd leg
Vojvodina-Univerexport (Serbia and Montenegro)	54–66	(Austria) A1 Bregenz HB	29–31	25–35
HC Berchem (Luxembourg)	48–67	(Iceland) Haukar Hafnarfjördur	25–34	23–33
Beşiktaş (Turkey)	70–76	(Romania) Dinamo Baumit București	34–41	36–35
KRAS/Volendan (Netherlands)	46–57	(Greece) Sony Athinaikos Athens	21–29	25–28
HRK Izvidac Ljubuski (Bosnia and Herzegovina)	68–49	(Finland) Sjundea IF	36–22	32–27
HC Tongeren (Belgium)	53–62	(Lithuania) HC Granitas Kaunas	29–31	24–31
Sandefjord TIF (Norway)	48–57	(Belarus) Brest HC Meshkov	27–31	21–26

== Group Matches ==
Key to colours in group tables
Teams that progressed to the first knockout round
Teams that progressed to the EHF Cup Winner's Cup
Teams eliminated from European competitions for the season

=== Group A ===
Pos	Team	Pld	W	D	L	GF	GA	GD	Pts
1	(France) Montpellier HB	6	4	0	2	182	170	+12	8
2	(Germany) SC Magdeburg	6	4	0	2	191	169	+22	8
3	(Russia) Chekhovskiye Medvedi	6	3	0	3	192	184	+8	6
4	(Austria) A1 Bregenz HB	6	1	0	5	162	204	−42	2

October 1, 2005
Chekhovskiye Medvedi	25–30	SC Magdeburg
October 2, 2005
Montpellier HB	33–24	A1 Bregenz HB
October 8, 2005
SC Magdeburg	32–28	Montpellier HB
A1 Bregenz HB	30–35	Chekhovskiye Medvedi
October 15, 2005
SC Magdeburg	37–27	A1 Bregenz HB
October 16, 2005
Montpellier HB	36–29	Chekhovskiye Medvedi
October 22, 2005
Montpellier HB	29–24	SC Magdeburg
Chekhovskiye Medvedi	40–23	A1 Bregenz HB
November 5, 2005
A1 Bregenz HB	26–28	Montpellier HB
SC Magdeburg	37–28	Chekhovskiye Medvedi
November 12, 2005
A1 Bregenz HB	32–31	SC Magdeburg
Chekhovskiye Medvedi	35–28	Montpellier HB

=== Group B ===
Pos	Team	Pld	W	D	L	GF	GA	GD	Pts
1	(Slovenia) Celje	6	5	0	1	191	143	+48	10
2	(Spain) C.BM. Ademar León	6	4	0	2	179	160	+19	8
3	(Sweden) IK Sävehof	6	3	0	3	156	180	−24	6
4	(Greece) Sony Athinaikos Athens	6	0	0	6	144	188	−44	0

October 1, 2005
Sony Athinaikos Athens	21–30	Celje
October 2, 2005
IK Sävehof	29–27	C.BM. Ademar León
October 8, 2005
C.BM. Ademar León	36–23	Sony Athinaikos Athens
Celje	24–19	IK Sävehof
October 15, 2005
C.BM. Ademar León	27–26	Celje
Sony Athinaikos Athens	27–31	IK Sävehof
October 22, 2005
Sony Athinaikos Athens	25–29	C.BM. Ademar León
October 23, 2005
IK Sävehof	26–33	Celje
November 5, 2005
Celje	33–23	Sony Athinaikos Athens
C.BM. Ademar León	33–22	IK Sävehof
November 12, 2005
Celje	35–27	C.BM. Ademar León
IK Sävehof	29–26	Sony Athinaikos Athens

=== Group C ===
Pos	Team	Pld	W	D	L	GF	GA	GD	Pts
1	(Denmark) Arhus GF	6	5	0	1	183	165	+18	10
2	(Slovenia) RK Gorenje Velenje	6	4	0	2	202	149	+53	8
3	(Italy) Torggler Group Meran	6	2	0	4	166	204	−38	4
4	(Iceland) Haukar Handball	6	1	0	5	160	193	−33	2

October 1, 2005
Haukar Hafnarfjördur	27–28	Arhus GF
October 2, 2005
Torggler Group Meran	24–39	RK Gorenje Velenje
October 8, 2005
Arhus GF	35–28	Torggler Group Meran
October 9, 2005
RK Gorenje Velenje	38–25	Haukar Hafnarfjördur
October 16, 2005
RK Gorenje Velenje	27–28	Arhus GF
Haukar Hafnarfjördur	32–29	Torggler Group Meran
October 22, 2005
Haukar Hafnarfjördur	28–33	RK Gorenje Velenje
Torggler Group Meran	37–31	Arhus GF
November 5, 2005
Arhus GF	34–21	Haukar Hafnarfjördur
November 6, 2005
RK Gorenje Velenje	40–17	Torggler Group Meran
November 12, 2005
Arhus GF	27–25	RK Gorenje Velenje
November 13, 2005
Torggler Group Meran	31–27	Haukar Hafnarfjördur

=== Group D ===
Pos	Team	Pld	W	D	L	GF	GA	GD	Pts
1	(Spain) FC Barcelona-Cifec	6	6	0	0	193	149	+44	12
2	(Hungary) SC Pick Szeged	6	3	0	3	161	150	+11	6
3	(Ukraine) ZTR Zaporizhia	6	1	1	4	160	174	−14	3
4	(Bosnia and Herzegovina) HRK Izvidac Ljubuski	6	1	1	4	148	189	−41	3

October 1, 2005
HRK Izvidac Ljubuski	27–35	FC Barcelona-Cifec
SC Pick Szeged	36–28	ZTR Zaporizhia
October 8, 2005
FC Barcelona-Cifec	27–20	SC Pick Szeged
October 9, 2005
ZTR Zaporizhia	32–20	HRK Izvidac Ljubuski
October 15, 2005
ZTR Zaporizhia	22–31	FC Barcelona-Cifec
HRK Izvidac Ljubuski	23–22	SC Pick Szeged
October 22, 2005
HRK Izvidac Ljubuski	29–29	ZTR Zaporizhia
SC Pick Szeged	26–28	FC Barcelona-Cifec
November 5, 2005
FC Barcelona-Cifec	38–27	HRK Izvidac Ljubuski
ZTR Zaporizhia	22–24	SC Pick Szeged
November 12, 2005
FC Barcelona-Cifec	34–27	ZTR Zaporizhia
SC Pick Szeged	33–22	HRK Izvidac Ljubuski

=== Group E ===
Pos	Team	Pld	W	D	L	GF	GA	GD	Pts
1	(Germany) THW Kiel	6	5	0	1	212	180	+32	10
2	(Denmark) KIF Kolding	6	4	0	2	188	175	+13	8
3	(Poland) Wisła Płock	6	2	0	4	155	182	−27	4
4	(Belarus) Brest HC Meshkov	6	1	0	5	165	183	−18	2

October 1, 2005
THW Kiel	35–28	Brest HC Meshkov
October 2, 2005
KIF Kolding	38–29	Wisla Plock SSA
October 8, 2005
Wisła Płock	32–31	THW Kiel
October 9, 2005
Brest HC Meshkov	27–29	KIF Kolding
October 15, 2005
Wisła Płock	31–23	Brest HC Meshkov
October 16, 2005
THW Kiel	36–29	KIF Kolding
October 22, 2005
THW Kiel	37–22	Wisla Plock SSA
October 23, 2005
KIF Kolding	29–28	Brest HC Meshkov
November 6, 2005
Brest HC Meshkov	31–37	THW Kiel
Wisła Płock	19–25	KIF Kolding
November 13, 2005
Brest HC Meshkov	28–22	Wisla Plock SSA
KIF Kolding	33–35	THW Kiel

=== Group F ===
Pos	Team	Pld	W	D	L	GF	GA	GD	Pts
1	(Spain) Ciudad Real	6	5	0	1	203	147	+56	10
2	(Hungary) MKB Veszprém KC	6	5	0	1	206	165	+41	10
3	(Slovakia) Tatran Presov	6	1	0	5	154	201	−47	2
4	(Romania) Dinamo Baumit București	6	1	0	5	148	198	−50	2

October 1, 2005
Dinamo Baumit București	24–29	BM Ciudad Real
October 2, 2005
Tatran Presov	23–35	MKB Veszprém KC
October 8, 2005
MKB Veszprém KC	37–27	Dinamo Baumit București
BM Ciudad Real	39–24	Tatran Presov
October 15, 2005
MKB Veszprém KC	31–29	BM Ciudad Real
Dinamo Baumit București	28–24	Tatran Presov
October 22, 2005
Dinamo Baumit București	27–38	MKB Veszprém KC
October 23, 2005
Tatran Presov	28–32	BM Ciudad Real
November 5, 2005
MKB Veszprém KC	42–25	Tatran Presov
November 6, 2005
BM Ciudad Real	40–17	Dinamo Baumit București
November 12, 2005
Tatran Presov	30–25	Dinamo Baumit București
November 13, 2005
BM Ciudad Real	34–23	MKB Veszprém KC

=== Group G ===
Pos	Team	Pld	W	D	L	GF	GA	GD	Pts
1	(Spain) Portland San Antonio	6	5	0	1	180	127	+53	10
2	(Croatia) RK Zagreb	6	4	1	1	163	143	+20	9
3	(Switzerland) Kadetten Schaffhausen	6	1	1	4	160	181	−21	3
4	(North Macedonia) Pelister Bitola	6	1	0	5	139	191	−52	2

October 1, 2005
Kadetten Schaffhausen	26–26	RK Zagreb
October 2, 2005
Portland San Antonio	33–18	Pelister Bitola
October 8, 2005
Pelister Bitola	32–31	Kadetten Schaffhausen
October 9, 2005
RK Zagreb	24–20	Portland San Antonio
October 15, 2005
Portland San Antonio	31–22	Kadetten Schaffhausen
October 16, 2005
RK Zagreb	37–13	Pelister Bitola
October 22, 2005
Portland San Antonio	31–15	RK Zagreb
Kadetten Schaffhausen	34–28	Pelister Bitola
November 6, 2005
Pelister Bitola	20–29	Portland San Antonio
RK Zagreb	30–23	Kadetten Schaffhausen
November 12, 2005
Kadetten Schaffhausen	28–36	Portland San Antonio
November 13, 2005
Pelister Bitola	30–31	RK Zagreb

=== Group H ===
Pos	Team	Pld	W	D	L	GF	GA	GD	Pts
1	(Germany) SG Flensburg-Handewitt	6	5	0	1	208	155	+53	10
2	(France) Paris Handball	6	4	1	1	163	157	+6	9
3	(Czech Republic) HC Banik Karvina	6	2	1	3	160	164	−4	5
4	(Lithuania) HC Granitas Kaunas	6	0	0	6	147	202	−55	0

October 1, 2005
HC Granitas Kaunas	22–27	Paris Handball
October 2, 2005
HC Banik Karvina	22–28	SG Flensburg-Handewitt
October 8, 2005
SG Flensburg-Handewitt	39–22	HC Granitas Kaunas
October 9, 2005
Paris Handball	21–18	HC Banik Karvina
October 15, 2005
SG Flensburg-Handewitt	37–24	Paris Handball
HC Granitas Kaunas	28–35	HC Banik Karvina
October 23, 2005
HC Granitas Kaunas	26–38	SG Flensburg-Handewitt
HC Banik Karvina	26–26	Paris Handball
November 5, 2005
SG Flensburg-Handewitt	35–28	HC Banik Karvina
November 6, 2005
Paris Handball	32–23	HC Granitas Kaunas
November 13, 2005
Paris Handball	33–31	SG Flensburg-Handewitt
HC Banik Karvina	31–26	HC Granitas Kaunas

== Round of 16 ==
Team 1	Agg.	Team 2	1st leg	2nd leg
KIF Kolding (Denmark)	63–65	(Slovenia) Celje	33–34	30–31
SC Magdeburg (Germany)	47–53	(Spain) FC Barcelona-Cifec	24–26	23–27
RK Zagreb (Croatia)	49–51	(Germany) SG Flensburg-Handewitt	25–23	24-28
SC Pick Szeged (Hungary)	58–68	(Spain) BM Ciudad Real	31–32	27–36
C.BM. Ademar León (Spain)	53–53(a)	(Spain) Portland San Antonio	31–26	22–27
RK Gorenje Velenje (Slovenia)	54–55	(France) Montpellier HB	26–22	28–33
MKB Veszprém KC (Hungary)	61–49	(Denmark) Arhus GF	30–21	31–28
Paris Handball (France)	49–72	(Germany) THW Kiel	21–28	28–44

== Quarter-finals ==
Team 1	Agg.	Team 2	1st leg	2nd leg
BM Ciudad Real (Spain)	67–55	(Slovenia) Celje	34–27	33–28
Portland San Antonio (Spain)	48–47	(Spain) FC Barcelona-Cifec	25–21	23–26
THW Kiel (Germany)	62–64	(Germany) SG Flensburg-Handewitt	28–32	34–32
Montpellier HB (France)	45–48	(Hungary) MKB Veszprém KC	23–21	22–27

== Semi-finals ==
Team 1	Agg.	Team 2	1st leg	2nd leg
BM Ciudad Real (Spain)	60–49	(Germany) SG Flensburg-Handewitt	31–22	29–27
MKB Veszprém KC (Hungary)	58–59	(Spain) Portland San Antonio	29–27	29–32

== Final ==
Team 1	Agg.	Team 2	1st leg	2nd leg
Portland San Antonio (Spain)	47–62	(Spain) BM Ciudad Real	19–25	28–37

== Top scorers ==
The top scorers from the 2005–06 EHF Champions League are as follows:

#	Name	Team	Goals
1.	(North Macedonia) Kiril Lazarov	(Hungary) MKB Veszprém KC	85
2.	(Russia) Eduard Kokcharov	(Slovenia) Celje	78
3.	(Croatia) Mirza Džomba	(Spain) BM Ciudad Real	73
4.	(Tunisia) Wissem Hmam	(France) Montpellier HB	70
5.	(Spain) Albert Rocas	(Spain) Portland San Antonio	69
6.	(Slovenia) Siarhei Rutenka	(Spain) BM Ciudad Real	67
7.	(Serbia and Montenegro) Momir Ilić	(Slovenia) RK Gorenje Velenje	65
8.	(Croatia) Vedran Zrnić	(Slovenia) RK Gorenje Velenje	63
9.	(Denmark) Bo Spellerberg	(Denmark) KIF Kolding	61
10.	(Spain) Rolando Uríos	(Spain) BM Ciudad Real	58
