= 2004–05 EHF Champions League =

European club handball tournament

EHF Champions League
- 2004–05

Tournament information
- Sport: Handball
- Dates: 10 September 2004–7 May 2005
- Administrator: EHF
- Participants: 37

Final positions
- Champions: (Spain) FC Barcelona
- Runner-up: (Spain) BM Ciudad Real

Tournament statistics
- Top scorer: (Slovenia) Siarhei Rutenka (95)

The 2004–05 EHF Champions League was the 45th edition of Europe's premier club handball tournament. RK Celje were the reigning champions. FC Barcelona won the tournament, beating BM Ciudad Real in the final.

== Qualification round ==
	Agg.		1st match	2nd match
HC Meshkov Brest (Belarus)	20 – 00	(Portugal) FC Porto	10 – 0	10 – 0
Sporting Neerpelt (Belgium)	55 – 70	(Iceland) Haukar Hafnarfjörður	30 – 42	25 – 28
Panellinios AC Athen (Greece)	50 – 59	(Bosnia and Herzegovina) RK Izviđac Ljubuški	27 – 35	23 – 24
A1 Bregenz (Austria)	53 – 63	(Slovakia) Tatran Prešov	32 – 28	21 – 35
Granitas Kaunas (Lithuania)	54 – 46	(Netherlands) Fiqas Aalsmeer	27 – 21	27 – 25

== Group stage ==
=== Group A ===
Team	Pld	W	D	L	GF	GA	GD	Pts
(Hungary) SC Pick Szeged	6	4	1	1	147	143	+4	9
(Spain) FC Barcelona	6	4	0	2	172	136	+36	8
(North Macedonia) Vardar Vatrost. Skopje	6	1	2	3	124	153	−29	4
(Romania) HCM Constanta	6	1	1	4	146	157	−11	3

=== Group B ===
Team	Pld	W	D	L	GF	GA	GD	Pts
(France) Montpellier HB	6	6	0	0	198	150	+48	12
(Ukraine) ZTR Zaporizhzhia	6	3	0	3	162	153	+9	6
(Croatia) RK Zagreb	6	3	0	3	165	170	−5	6
(Italy) A.S. Conversano 2003	6	0	0	6	143	195	−52	0

=== Group C ===
Team	Pld	W	D	L	GF	GA	GD	Pts
(Russia) Chehovski Medvedi	6	5	0	1	197	179	+18	10
(Denmark) GOG Gudme	6	4	0	2	178	151	+27	8
(Slovenia) Gorenje	6	2	0	4	166	170	−4	4
(Belarus) HC Meshkov Brest	6	1	0	5	143	184	−41	2

=== Group D ===
Team	Pld	W	D	L	GF	GA	GD	Pts
(Spain) Portland San Antonio	6	5	0	1	194	143	+51	10
(Slovenia) Celje	6	4	0	2	188	163	+25	8
(Serbia) Crvena Zvezda Beograd	6	2	0	4	143	201	−58	4
(Poland) Wisła Płock	6	1	0	5	159	177	−18	2

=== Group E ===
Team	Pld	W	D	L	GF	GA	GD	Pts
(Spain) BM Ciudad Real	6	6	0	0	199	167	+32	12
(Denmark) KIF Kolding	6	3	0	3	216	202	+14	6
(Bosnia and Herzegovina) RK Izvidac Ljubuski	6	3	0	3	183	201	−18	6
(Switzerland) Pfadi Winterthur	6	0	0	6	168	196	−28	0

=== Group F ===
Team	Pld	W	D	L	GF	GA	GD	Pts
(Germany) THW Kiel	6	5	0	1	200	159	+41	10
(Sweden) IK Sävehof	6	3	2	1	172	171	+1	8
(Iceland) Haukar Handball	6	1	1	4	186	211	−25	3
(France) US Creteil Handball	6	1	1	4	162	179	−17	3

=== Group G ===
Team	Pld	W	D	L	GF	GA	GD	Pts
(Hungary) Fotex KC Veszprém	6	6	0	0	195	138	+57	12
(Germany) TBV Lemgo	6	4	0	2	185	158	+27	8
(Lithuania) Granitas Kaunas	6	1	1	4	144	197	−53	3
(Norway) Sandefjord TIF	6	0	1	5	154	185	−31	1

=== Group H ===
Team	Pld	W	D	L	GF	GA	GD	Pts
(Germany) SG Flensburg-Handewitt	6	5	1	0	204	155	+49	11
(Slovakia) Tatran Presov	6	3	1	2	174	158	+16	7
(Czech Republic) HC Banik Karvina	6	2	1	3	159	174	−15	5
(Croatia) RK Metkovic	6	0	1	5	141	191	−50	1

== Knockout stage ==
=== Round of 16 ===
Team #1	Agg.	Team #2	1st match	2nd match
KIF Kolding (Denmark)	63 – 65	(France) Montpellier HB	38 – 29	25 – 36
Celje (Slovenia)	44 – 43	(Hungary) SC Pick Szeged	23 – 23	21 – 20
Tatran Presov (Slovakia)	57 – 79	(Germany) THW Kiel	32 – 38	25 – 41
ZTR Zaporizhzhia (Ukraine)	58 – 67	(Hungary) Fotex KC Veszprém	29 – 28	29 – 39
TBV Lemgo (Germany)	67 – 55	(Russia) Chehovski Medvedi	45 – 32	22 – 23
IK Sävehof (Sweden)	60 – 61	(Germany) SG Flensburg-Handewitt	34 – 30	26 – 31
GOG Gudme (Denmark)	60 – 79	(Spain) BM Ciudad Real	29 – 45	31 – 34
FC Barcelona (Spain)	52 – 52	(Spain) Portland San Antonio	28 – 22	24 – 30

=== Quarterfinals ===
Team #1	Agg.	Team #2	1st match	2nd match
THW Kiel (Germany)	57 – 58	(Spain) FC Barcelona	30 – 25	27 – 33
Montpellier HB (France)	55 – 54	(Germany) SG Flensburg-Handewitt	36 – 22	19 – 32
BM Ciudad Real (Spain)	63 – 55	(Hungary) Fotex KC Veszprém	29 – 22	34 – 33
TBV Lemgo (Germany)	59 – 68	(Slovenia) Celje	29 – 33	30 – 35

=== Semifinals ===
Team #1	Agg.	Team #2	1st match	2nd match
Celje (Slovenia)	60 – 62	(Spain) FC Barcelona	34 – 31	26 – 31
Ciudad Real (Spain)	61 – 57	(France) Montpellier HB	30 – 24	31 – 33

=== Finals ===
Team #1	Agg.	Team #2	1st match	2nd match
BM Ciudad Real (Spain)	55 – 56	(Spain) FC Barcelona	28–27	27–29
