= 1995–96 EHF Champions League =

European handball tournament

EHF Champions League
- 1995–96

Tournament information
- Sport: Handball
- Dates: 3 September 1995–26 April 1996
- Administrator: EHF
- Participants: 35

Final positions
- Champions: FC Barcelona

Tournament statistics
- Top scorer: (Portugal) Carlos Resende (80)

The 1995–96 EHF Champions League was the 36th edition of Europe's premier club handball tournament. CD Bidasoa Irún were the reigning champions. FC Barcelona won the title, beating CD Bidasoa Irún in the final.

== Knockout stage ==
=== Preliminary round ===
Team 1	Agg.	Team 2	1st leg	2nd leg
RK Partizan (Serbia and Montenegro)	58–41	(Slovakia) Agro VTJ Topolcany	28–22	30–19
Dinamo Bucuresti (Romania)	44–45	(North Macedonia) Borec Titov Veles	26–18	18–27
HC Kehra (Estonia)	44–60	(Georgia (country)) GTU Tbilisi	23–25	21–35

=== Round of 32 ===
Team 1	Agg.	Team 2	1st leg	2nd leg
ABC Braga (Portugal)	64–39	(Israel) Hapoel Rishon Le Zion	37–17	30–22
Fotex Veszprém SE (Hungary)	67–33	(Luxembourg) HC Berchem	31–20	36–13
Croatia Banka Zagreb	53–44	(Turkey) Cankaya Bel. Ankara	28–18	25–26
GOG Gudme (Denmark)	52–47	(Serbia and Montenegro) Partizan Beograd	34–21	18–26
FC Barcelona (Spain)	70–39	(Georgia (country)) GTU Tbilisi	40–19	30–20
Montpellier HB (France)	49–43	(Czech Republic) HC Dukla Prague	25–24	24–19
Elgorriaga Bidasoa (Spain)	50–35	(North Macedonia) Borec Titov Veles	25–20	25–15
THW Kiel (Germany)	45–30	(Belgium) Initia HC Hasselt	27–13	18–17
Celje Pivovarna Lasko (Slovenia)	73–32	(Bulgaria) HC Lyulin Sofia	38–16	35–16
Filippos Veria H.C. (Greece)	42–49	(Ukraine) ZTR Zaporizhzhia	23–19	19–30
SKA Minsk (Belarus)	61–46	(Finland) BK 46 Karis	34–24	27–22
Valur Reykjavik (Iceland)	44–43	(Russia) CSKA Moscow	23–23	21–20
ASKÖ Linde Linz (Austria)	47–43	(Poland) Petrochemia Płock	29–18	18–25
Granitas Kaunas (Lithuania)	53–45	(Norway) Runar Sandefjord	29–19	24–26
Principe Trieste (Italy)	55–43	(Netherlands) Thrifty Aalsmeer	26–18	29–25
Pfadi Winterthur (Switzerland)	42–42	(Sweden) Redbergslids Göteborg	24–16	18–26

=== Round of 16 ===
Team 1	Agg.	Team 2	1st leg	2nd leg
SKA Minsk (Belarus)	47–51	(Denmark) GOG Gudme	26–23	21–28
ZTR Zaporizhzhia (Ukraine)	32–43	(Spain) Elgorriaga Bidasoa	15–19	17–24
Granitas Kaunas (Lithuania)	42–50	(Germany) THW Kiel	21–26	21–24
ASKÖ Linde Linz (Austria)	47–62	(Spain) FC Barcelona	30–27	17–35
Celje Pivovarna Lasko (Slovenia)	45–46	Croatia Banka Zagreb	25–21	20–25
Pfadi Winterthur (Switzerland)	53–46	(France) Montpellier HB	27–23	26–23
Valur Reykjavik (Iceland)	50–52	(Portugal) ABC Braga	25–23	25–29
Principe Trieste (Italy)	38–44	(Hungary) Fotex Veszprém SE	22–23	16–21

== Group stage ==
=== Group A ===
Team	Pld	W	D	L	GF	GA	GD	Pts
(Spain) Elgorriaga Bidasoa	6	4	0	2	154	136	+18	8
(Germany) THW Kiel	6	3	0	3	151	148	+3	6
(Hungary) Fotex Veszprém SE	6	3	0	3	147	144	+3	6
(Portugal) ABC Braga	6	2	0	4	129	153	−24	4

=== Group B ===
Team	Pld	W	D	L	GF	GA	GD	Pts
(Spain) FC Barcelona	6	4	1	1	167	135	+32	9
(Switzerland) Pfadi Winterthur	6	3	0	3	161	164	−3	6
(Croatia) Badel 1862 Zagreb	6	2	1	3	138	144	−6	5
(Denmark) GOG Gudme	6	1	2	3	136	159	−23	4

== Knockout stage ==
=== Finals ===
Team 1	Agg.	Team 2	1st leg	2nd leg
FC Barcelona (Spain)	46–38	(Spain) Elgorriaga Bidasoa	23–15	23–23
