= 2001–02 EHF Champions League =

European handball tournament

EHF Champions League
- 2001–02

Tournament information
- Sport: Handball
- Dates: 19 September 2001–27 April 2002
- Administrator: EHF
- Participants: 32

Final positions
- Champions: (Germany) SC Magdeburg
- Runner-up: (Hungary) Veszprém KC

Tournament statistics
- Top scorer: (Socialist Federal Republic of Yugoslavia) Nenad Peruničić (83 goals)

The 2001–02 EHF Champions League was the 42nd edition of Europe's premier club handball tournament. Portland San Antonio were the reigning champions. SC Magdeburg won the title, beating Veszprém KC in the final. This was the first time since 1992-93 edition that the tournament was won by a non-spanish team.

== Round 1 ==
Team #1	Agg.	Team #2	1st match	2nd match
A.C. Doukas School (Greece)	53–56	(Turkey) ASKI Ankara	25–27	28–29
ŠKP Sečovce (Slovakia)	50–47	(Austria) Bregenz Handball	28–22	22–25
HV Aalsmeer (Netherlands)	61–47	(Bulgaria) Lokomotiv Varna	34–24	27–23
ZTR Zaporizhzhia (Ukraine)	64–37	(Bosnia and Herzegovina) RK Gračanica	32–20	32–17
Wybrzeże Gdańsk (Poland)	57–41	(Luxembourg) HC Berchem	33–20	24–21
HCB Karviná (Czech Republic)	55–40	(Lithuania) Granitas Kaunas	32–20	23–20
Hapoel Rishon LeZion (Israel)	59–39	(Belgium) HC Eynatten	33–19	26–20
SKA Minsk (Belarus)	50–56	(Romania) Steaua Bucharest	23–25	27–31

== Round 2 ==
Team #1	Agg.	Team #2	1st match	2nd match
ZTR Zaporizhzhia (Ukraine)	50–58	(Denmark) KIF Kolding	23–25	27–33
Hapoel Rishon LeZion (Israel)	48–45	(Italy) Pallamano Trieste	26–18	22–27
Steaua Bucharest (Romania)	49–58	(Portugal) Sporting Lisbon	24–33	25–25
Wybrzeże Gdańsk (Poland)	35–54	(Russia) HBC CSKA Moscow	15–25	20–29
HCB Karviná (Czech Republic)	74–52	(Switzerland) TSV St. Otmar St. Gallen	38–27	36–25
ŠKP Sečovce (Slovenia)	40–53	(France) Chambéry Savoie HB	19–26	21–27
HV Aalsmeer (Netherlands)	53–61	(Sweden) Redbergslids IK	24–31	29–30
Vardar Skopje (North Macedonia)	64–59	(Turkey) ASKI Ankara	37–31	27–28

== Group stage ==
=== Group A ===
Team	Pld	W	D	L	GF	GA	GD	Pts
(Denmark) Kolding IF	6	4	1	1	159	141	+18	9
(Spain) SDC San Antonio	6	4	1	1	188	152	+36	9
(Portugal) Sporting CP	6	2	0	4	132	149	−17	4
(Serbia and Montenegro) Lovćen Osiguranje Cetinje	6	1	0	5	110	147	−37	2

=== Group B ===
Team	Pld	W	D	L	GF	GA	GD	Pts
(Croatia) RK Metković Jambo	6	5	0	1	166	138	+28	10
(Sweden) Redbergslids IK	6	5	0	1	167	151	+16	10
(Norway) Sandefjord TIF	6	2	0	4	161	164	−3	4
(Israel) Hapoel Rishon LeZion	6	0	0	6	151	192	−41	0

=== Group C ===
Team	Pld	W	D	L	GF	GA	GD	Pts
(Slovenia) Celje	6	5	0	1	176	160	+16	10
(Spain) CB Ademar Leon	6	4	0	2	177	159	+18	8
(Czech Republic) HBC Karvina	6	2	0	4	170	178	−8	4
(Russia) CSKA Moskva	6	1	0	5	155	181	−26	2

=== Group D ===
Team	Pld	W	D	L	GF	GA	GD	Pts
(Hungary) KC Veszprém	6	5	0	1	157	130	+27	10
(Germany) SC Magdeburg	6	3	2	1	162	141	+21	8
(France) S. O. Chambery	6	1	1	4	149	174	−25	3
(North Macedonia) Vardar Vatrost. Skopje	6	1	1	4	152	175	−23	3

== Knockout stage ==
=== Quarterfinals ===
Team #1	Agg.	Team #2	1st match	2nd match
Redbergslids IK (Sweden)	58 – 60	(Denmark) Kolding IF	31 – 30	27 – 30
SDC San Antonio (Spain)	50 – 48	(Croatia) RK Metković Jambo	28 – 21	22 – 27
SC Magdeburg (Germany)	57 – 56	(Slovenia) Celje	29 – 31	28 – 25
CB Ademar Leon (Spain)	40 – 57	(Hungary) Fotex KC Veszprém	22 – 27	18 – 30

=== Semifinals ===
Team #1	Agg.	Team #2	1st match	2nd match
MKB Veszprém KC (Hungary)	48 – 46	(Spain) SDC San Antonio	27 – 19	21–27
SC Magdeburg (Germany)	57 – 44	(Denmark) Kolding IF	29 – 19	28 – 25

=== Finals ===
Team #1	Agg.	Team #2	1st match	2nd match
MKB Veszprém KC (Hungary)	48 – 51	(Germany) SC Magdeburg	23 – 21	25 – 30
