= 1996–97 EHF Champions League =

European handball tournament

EHF Champions League
- 1996–97

Tournament information
- Sport: Handball
- Dates: 24 August 1996–19 April 1997
- Participants: 36

Final positions
- Champions: FC Barcelona

Tournament statistics
- Top scorer: (Portugal) Carlos Resende (82)

The 1996–97 EHF Champions League was the 37th edition of Europe's premier club handball tournament. FC Barcelona won their third title and second in a row.

== Preliminary round ==
Team 1	Agg.	Team 2	1st leg	2nd leg
Agro VTJ Topolcany (Slovakia)	56–43	(Bulgaria) HK Shoumen	31–22	25–21
HC Red Star (Socialist Federal Republic of Yugoslavia)	71–41	(Estonia) HC Kehra	32–20	39–21
Pelister Bitola (North Macedonia)	52–41	(Georgia (country)) GTU Tbilisi	28–27	24–14
Steaua București (Romania)	54–49	(Bosnia and Herzegovina) RK Sloboda Solana	30–24	24–25

=== Round of 32 ===
Team 1	Agg.	Team 2	1st leg	2nd leg
FC Barcelona (Spain)	71–51	(Russia) HC Kaustik Volgograd	37–22	34–29
THW Kiel (Germany)	59–32	(Luxembourg) Handball Esch	33–17	26–15
Pfadi Winterthur (Switzerland)	45–44	(Sweden) Redbergslids IK	24–17	21–27
Badel 1862 Zagreb (Croatia)	58–44	(Turkey) Cankaya Bel. Ankara	27–24	31–20
SKA Minsk (Belarus)	41–37	(Austria) HC Linz AG	18-19	23-18
ABC Braga (Portugal)	41–40	(Israel) Hapoel Rishon LeZion	24–19	17–21
GOG Gudme (Denmark)	40–38	(North Macedonia) Pelister Bitola	21–24	19–14
Principe Trieste (Italy)	40–38	(Poland) Jskra Ceresit Kielce	21–22	19–16
Granitas Kaunas (Lithuania)	55–28	(Netherlands) ANOVA E&O Emmen	33–13	22–15
Celje Pivovarna Lasko (Slovenia)	66–34	(Slovakia) Agro VTJ Topolcany	33–16	33–18
HC Red Star (Socialist Federal Republic of Yugoslavia)	52–49	(Czech Republic) HC Zubří	24–23	28–26
PSG Asnieres Hand-Ball (France)	45–39	(Belgium) Initia HC Hasselt	18–22	27–17
SC Pick Szeged (Hungary)	50–42	(Romania) Steaua București	27-17	23-25
Runar Sandefjord (Norway)	53–37	(Greece) ESN Vrilissia	32-17	20-21
Shakhtar Donetsk (Ukraine)	47–35	(Iceland) Valur Reykjavik	20-19	27-16
Caja Cantabria Santander (Spain)	55–38	(Finland) BK 46 Karis	29-20	26-18

== Group stage ==
=== Group A ===
Team	Pld	W	D	L	GF	GA	GD	Pts
(Spain) FC Barcelona	6	5	1	0	180	127	+53	11
(Portugal) ABC Braga	6	3	0	3	141	136	+5	6
(Ukraine) Shakhtar Donetsk	6	2	0	4	127	152	−25	4
(Lithuania) Granitas Kaunas	6	1	1	4	118	151	−33	3

=== Group B ===
Team	Pld	W	D	L	GF	GA	GD	Pts
(Croatia) Badel 1862 Zagreb	6	4	2	0	168	141	+27	10
(Hungary) SC Pick Szeged	6	3	2	1	163	150	+13	8
(Norway) Runar Sandefjord	6	3	0	3	155	168	−13	6
(Italy) Principe Trieste	6	0	0	6	147	174	−27	0

=== Group C ===
Team	Pld	W	D	L	GF	GA	GD	Pts
(Germany) THW Kiel	6	5	0	1	154	118	+36	10
(Switzerland) Pfadi Winterthur	6	5	0	1	145	137	+8	10
(Socialist Federal Republic of Yugoslavia) HC Red Star	6	2	0	4	150	155	−5	4
(Belarus) SKA Minsk	6	0	0	6	114	153	−39	0

=== Group D ===
Team	Pld	W	D	L	GF	GA	GD	Pts
(Slovenia) Celje Pivovarna Lasko	6	5	0	1	155	122	+33	10
(Spain) Caja Cantabria Santander	6	5	0	1	154	135	+19	10
(Denmark) GOG Gudme	6	1	0	5	133	155	−22	2
(France) PSG Asnieres Hand-Ball	6	1	0	5	131	161	−30	2

== Knockout stage ==
=== Quarterfinals ===
Team 1	Agg.	Team 2	1st leg	2nd leg
SC Pick Szeged (Hungary)	42–66	(Spain) FC Barcelona	25–26	17–40
ABC Braga (Portugal)	46–49	(Croatia) Badel 1862 Zagreb	24–23	22–26
Caja Cantabria Santander (Spain)	45–47	(Germany) THW Kiel	26–23	19–24
Pfadi Winterthur (Switzerland)	40–49	(Slovenia) Celje Pivovarna Lasko	21–21	19–28

=== Semifinals ===
Team 1	Agg.	Team 2	1st leg	2nd leg
Celje Pivovarna Lasko (Slovenia)	50–51	(Spain) FC Barcelona	24–29	26–22
THW Kiel (Germany)	46–48	(Croatia) Badel 1862 Zagreb	23–23	23–25

=== Finals ===
Team 1	Agg.	Team 2	1st leg	2nd leg
FC Barcelona (Spain)	61–45	(Croatia) Badel 1862 Zagreb	31–22	30–23
