= 2006–07 EHF Champions League =

European handball tournament

Tournament details
- Dates: 1 September 2006 - 29 April 2007
- Teams: 39
- Defending champions: BM Ciudad Real

Final positions
- Champions: THW Kiel
- Runners-up: SG Flensburg-Handewitt

Tournament statistics
- Scoring leader(s): Nikola Karabatić (89 goals)

Official website
- EHF Site

The EHF Champions League 2006–07 was the 2006–2007 edition of the EHF Champions League who is managed by EHF. BM Ciudad Real were the reigning champions. THW Kiel won the title, beating SG Flensburg-Handewitt in the final. This was the first time since 1978-79 with an all-German final.

== Qualification round ==
Team 1	Agg.	Team 2	1st leg	2nd leg
Panellinios AC Athens (Greece)	47–46	(Cyprus) SPE Strovolos Nicosia	25–23	22–23
Maliye Milli Piyango SK (Turkey)	62–73	(Serbia) RK Crvena zvezda	33–37	29–36
A1 Bregenz HB (Austria)	69–40	(Lithuania) "Viking Malt" Panevezys	39–16	30–24
KRAS/Volendan (Netherlands)	48–55	(Belarus) Brest HC Meshkov	23–31	25–24
C.S. HCM Constanta (Romania)	63–54	(Italy) Pallamano Conversano.IT	38–24	25–30
RK Metalurg Skopje (North Macedonia)	62–55	(Portugal) ABC de Braga-Andebol SAD	30–28	32–27
HC Berchem (Luxembourg)	50–80	(Norway) Sandefjord TIF	26–37	24–43

== Group stage ==
Key to colours in group tables
Teams that progressed to the first knockout round
Teams that progressed to the EHF Cup Winner's Cup
Teams eliminated from European competitions for the season

=== Group A ===
Pos	Team	Pld	W	D	L	GF	GA	GD	Pts
1	(Spain) Portland San Antonio	6	5	0	1	199	146	+53	10
2	(Hungary) MKB Veszprém KC	6	5	0	1	207	160	+47	10
3	(Bosnia and Herzegovina) RK "Bosna" Sarajevo	6	2	0	4	167	188	−21	4
4	(Slovakia) MŠK Považská Bystrica	6	0	0	6	161	240	−79	0

September 30, 2006
Portland San Antonio	34–27	MKB Veszprém KC
MSK SIRS Povazska Bystrica	29–31	RK "Bosna" Sarajevo
October 7, 2006
MKB Veszprém KC	46–26	MSK SIRS Povazska Bystrica
October 8, 2006
RK "Bosna" Sarajevo	22–32	Portland San Antonio
October 15, 2006
RK "Bosna" Sarajevo	25–31	MKB Veszprém KC
Portland San Antonio	42–25	MSK SIRS Povazska Bystrica
October 21, 2006
MSK SIRS Povazska Bystrica	30–46	MKB Veszprém KC
October 22, 2006
Portland San Antonio	34–26	RK "Bosna" Sarajevo
November 4, 2006
MKB Veszprém KC	23–21	Portland San Antonio
November 5, 2006
RK "Bosna" Sarajevo	39–28	MSK SIRS Povazska Bystrica
November 11, 2006
MKB Veszprém KC	34–24	RK "Bosna" Sarajevo
MSK SIRS Povazska Bystrica	23–36	Portland San Antonio

=== Group B ===
Pos	Team	Pld	W	D	L	GF	GA	GD	Pts
1	(Spain) BM Ciudad Real	6	6	0	0	206	162	+44	12
2	(Hungary) SC Pick Szeged	6	3	1	2	153	153	0	7
3	(Switzerland) Kadetten Schaffhausen	6	2	1	3	168	169	−1	5
4	(Belarus) Brest HC Meshkov	6	0	0	6	144	188	−44	0

September 30, 2006
SC Pick Szeged	20–25	BM Ciudad Real
Kadetten Schaffhausen	30–20	Brest HC Meshkov
October 7, 2006
Brest HC Meshkov	24–30	SC Pick Szeged
October 8, 2006
BM Ciudad Real	39–31	Kadetten Schaffhausen
October 14, 2006
SC Pick Szeged	27–27	Kadetten Schaffhausen
October 15, 2006
Brest HC Meshkov	27–34	BM Ciudad Real
October 21, 2006
SC Pick Szeged	28–23	Brest HC Meshkov
Kadetten Schaffhausen	30–37	BM Ciudad Real
November 4, 2006
BM Ciudad Real	32–25	SC Pick Szeged
Brest HC Meshkov	23–28	Kadetten Schaffhausen
November 11, 2006
BM Ciudad Real	39–29	Brest HC Meshkov
Kadetten Schaffhausen	22–23	SC Pick Szeged

=== Group C ===
Pos	Team	Pld	W	D	L	GF	GA	GD	Pts
1	(Denmark) KIF Kolding	6	5	1	0	199	153	+46	11
2	(France) Chambéry Savoie HB	6	3	1	2	171	163	+8	7
3	(Poland) Wisła Płock	6	2	0	4	141	170	−29	4
4	(Serbia) RK Crvena zvezda	6	1	0	5	158	183	−25	2

September 28, 2006
Wisła Płock	31–19	RK Crvena zvezda
September 30, 2006
Chambéry Savoie HB	26–32	KIF Kolding
October 7, 2006
KIF Kolding	35–18	Wisla Plock S.A.
October 8, 2006
RK Crvena zvezda	26–27	Chambéry Savoie HB
October 15, 2006
RK Crvena zvezda	30–36	KIF Kolding
Chambéry Savoie HB	21–13	Wisla Plock S.A.
October 19, 2006
Wisła Płock	25–31	KIF Kolding
October 21, 2006
Chambéry Savoie HB	34–28	RK Crvena zvezda
November 4, 2006
KIF Kolding	32–32	Chambéry Savoie HB
November 5, 2006
RK Crvena zvezda	33–22	Wisla Plock S.A.
November 9, 2006
Wisła Płock	32–31	Chambéry Savoie HB
November 12, 2006
KIF Kolding	33–22	RK Crvena zvezda

=== Group D ===
Pos	Team	Pld	W	D	L	GF	GA	GD	Pts
1	(Germany) SG Flensburg-Handewitt	6	5	0	1	199	164	+35	10
2	(Russia) Chekhovskiye Medvedi	6	4	0	2	182	164	+18	8
3	(Croatia) RK Zagreb	6	3	0	3	153	148	+5	6
4	(North Macedonia) RK Metalurg Skopje	6	0	0	6	148	206	−58	0

September 28, 2006
SG Flensburg-Handewitt	35–28	RK Zagreb
September 30, 2006
Chekhovskiye Medvedi	40–25	RK Metalurg Skopje
October 8, 2006
RK Metalurg Skopje	29–37	SG Flensburg-Handewitt
RK Zagreb	26–19	Chekhovskiye Medvedi
October 12, 2006
SG Flensburg-Handewitt	34–29	Chekhovskiye Medvedi
October 14, 2006
RK Metalurg Skopje	18–22	RK Zagreb
October 19, 2006
SG Flensburg-Handewitt	43–24	RK Metalurg Skopje
October 21, 2006
Chekhovskiye Medvedi	29–24	RK Zagreb
November 4, 2006
RK Metalurg Skopje	28–32	Chekhovskiye Medvedi
November 5, 2006
RK Zagreb	21–23	SG Flensburg-Handewitt
November 11, 2006
Chekhovskiye Medvedi	33–27	SG Flensburg-Handewitt
November 12, 2006
RK Zagreb	32–24	RK Metalurg Skopje

=== Group E ===
Pos	Team	Pld	W	D	L	GF	GA	GD	Pts
1	(Germany) THW Kiel	6	6	0	0	244	170	+74	12
2	(Denmark) GOG Svendborg TGI Gudme	6	3	0	3	203	180	+23	6
3	(Romania) C.S. HCM Constanta	6	2	1	3	172	205	−33	5
4	(Czech Republic) HC Banik OKD Karvina	6	0	1	5	175	239	−64	1

October 1, 2006
GOG Svendborg TGI Gudme	28–32	THW Kiel
HC Banik OKD Karvina	31–34	C.S. HCM Constanta
October 5, 2006
THW Kiel	44–25	HC Banik OKD Karvina
October 7, 2006
C.S. HCM Constanta	33–28	GOG Svendborg TGI Gudme
October 14, 2006
C.S. HCM Constanta	28–37	THW Kiel
October 15, 2006
GOG Svendborg TGI Gudme	45–32	HC Banik OKD Karvina
October 22, 2006
GOG Svendborg TGI Gudme	33–17	C.S. HCM Constanta
HC Banik OKD Karvina	26–50	THW Kiel
November 2, 2006
THW Kiel	34–32	GOG Svendborg TGI Gudme
November 4, 2006
C.S. HCM Constanta	29–29	HC Banik OKD Karvina
November 12, 2006
THW Kiel	47–31	C.S. HCM Constanta
HC Banik OKD Karvina	32–37	GOG Svendborg TGI Gudme

=== Group F ===
Pos	Team	Pld	W	D	L	GF	GA	GD	Pts
1	(Germany) VfL Gummersbach	6	5	0	1	212	177	+35	10
2	(Slovenia) Celje	6	5	0	1	205	170	+35	10
3	(Norway) Sandefjord TIF	6	2	0	4	179	202	−23	4
4	(Iceland) Fram Reykjavik	6	0	0	6	163	210	−47	0

September 30, 2006
Sandefjord TIF	26–37	Celje
October 1, 2006
Fram Reykjavik	26–38	VfL Gummersbach
October 5, 2006
VfL Gummersbach	36–25	Sandefjord TIF
October 8, 2006
Celje	35–24	Fram Reykjavik
October 12, 2006
VfL Gummersbach	34–31	Celje
October 14, 2006
Sandefjord TIF	35–26	Fram Reykjavik
October 21, 2006
Sandefjord TIF	35–37	VfL Gummersbach
Fram Reykjavik	30–33	Celje
November 2, 2006
VfL Gummersbach	38–29	Fram Reykjavik
November 4, 2006
Celje	38–27	Sandefjord TIF
November 11, 2006
Celje	31–29	VfL Gummersbach
Fram Reykjavik	28–31	Sandefjord TIF

=== Group G ===
Pos	Team	Pld	W	D	L	GF	GA	GD	Pts
1	(Spain) FC Barcelona-Cifec	6	6	0	0	205	152	+53	12
2	(Slovenia) RK Gold Club Kozina	6	3	0	3	168	180	−12	6
3	(Greece) Panellinios AC Athens	6	2	0	4	160	197	−37	4
4	(Sweden) Hammarby IF HB	6	1	0	5	182	186	−4	2

September 30, 2006
RK Gold Club Kozina	26–29	FC Barcelona-Cifec
Hammarby IF HB	37–23	Panellinios AC Athens
October 7, 2006
FC Barcelona-Cifec	33–28	Hammarby IF HB
October 8, 2006
Panellinios AC Athens	32–27	RK Gold Club Kozina
October 12, 2006
RK Gold Club Kozina	30–28	Hammarby IF HB
October 14, 2006
Panellinios AC Athens	22–37	FC Barcelona-Cifec
October 21, 2006
RK Gold Club Kozina	32–25	Panellinios AC Athens
Hammarby IF HB	31–34	FC Barcelona-Cifec
November 4, 2006
FC Barcelona-Cifec	38–21	RK Gold Club Kozina
November 5, 2006
Panellinios AC Athens	34–30	Hammarby IF HB
November 11, 2006
FC Barcelona-Cifec	34–24	Panellinios AC Athens
November 14, 2006
Hammarby IF HB	28–32	RK Gold Club Kozina

=== Group H ===
Pos	Team	Pld	W	D	L	GF	GA	GD	Pts
1	(Spain) CBM Valladolid	6	4	2	0	197	162	+35	10
2	(France) Montpellier HB	6	4	1	1	173	144	+29	9
3	(Ukraine) HC Portovik Yuzhny	6	2	0	4	138	161	−23	4
4	(Austria) A1 Bregenz HB	6	0	1	5	144	185	−41	1

September 30, 2006
A1 Bregenz HB	17–29	Montpellier HB
October 1, 2006
HC Portovik Yuzhny	28–33	CBM Valladolid
October 7, 2006
CBM Valladolid	35–24	A1 Bregenz HB
Montpellier HB	26–16	HC Portovik Yuzhny
October 14, 2006
CBM Valladolid	34–25	Montpellier HB
A1 Bregenz HB	20–22	HC Portovik Yuzhny
October 21, 2006
A1 Bregenz HB	35–35	CBM Valladolid
HC Portovik Yuzhny	24–27	Montpellier HB
November 4, 2006
Montpellier HB	37–24	A1 Bregenz HB
CBM Valladolid	31–21	HC Portovik Yuzhny
November 11, 2006
HC Portovik Yuzhny	27–24	A1 Bregenz HB
November 12, 2006
Montpellier HB	29–29	CBM Valladolid

== Round of 16 ==
Team 1	Agg.	Team 2	1st leg	2nd leg
Montpellier HB (France)	51–54	(Spain) FC Barcelona-Cifec	28–25	23–29
MKB Veszprém KC (Hungary)	60–53	(Denmark) KIF Kolding	32–22	28–31
RK Gold Club (Slovenia)	52–70	(Spain) Portland San Antonio	23–34	29–36
GOG Svendborg TGI Gudme (Denmark)	58–64	(Spain) BM Ciudad Real	28–33	30–31
SC Pick Szeged (Hungary)	49–50	(Spain) CBM Valladolid	25–25	24–25
Celje (Slovenia)	67–67(a)	(Germany) SG Flensburg-Handewitt	41–31	26–36
Chekhovskiye Medvedi (Russia)	60–69	(Germany) VfL Gummersbach	31–37	29–32
Chambéry Savoie HB (France)	60–76	(Germany) THW Kiel	33–39	27–37

== Quarter-finals ==
Team 1	Agg.	Team 2	1st leg	2nd leg
Valladolid (Spain)	70–68	(Germany) Gummersbach	36–36	34–32
MKB Veszprém KC (Hungary)	71–75	(Germany) THW Kiel	39–36	32–39
Ciudad Real (Spain)	55–58	(Spain) Portland San Antonio	26–21	29–37
SG Flensburg-Handewitt (Germany)	60–55	(Spain) FC Barcelona-Cifec	31–21	29–34

== Semi-finals ==
Team 1	Agg.	Team 2	1st leg	2nd leg
Portland San Antonio (Spain)	64–65	(Germany) THW Kiel	30–28	34–37
SG Flensburg-Handewitt (Germany)	56–55	(Spain) Valladolid	32–30	24–25

== Final ==
Team 1	Agg.	Team 2	1st leg	2nd leg
SG Flensburg-Handewitt (Germany)	55–57	(Germany) THW Kiel	28–28	27–29

== Top scorers ==
The top scorers from the 2006–07 EHF Champions League are as follows:

#	Name	Team	Goals
1.	(France) Nikola Karabatić	(Germany) THW Kiel	89
2.	(Denmark) Lars Christiansen	(Germany) SG Flensburg-Handewitt	84
3.	(North Macedonia) Kiril Lazarov	(Hungary) MKB Veszprém KC	82
4.	(Argentina) Eric Gull	(Spain) BM Valladolid	79
5.	(Sweden) Kim Andersson	(Germany) THW Kiel	73
6.	(Sweden) Henrik Lundström	(Germany) THW Kiel	65
7.	(Montenegro) Alen Muratović	(Spain) BM Valladolid	64
7.	(Iceland) Guðjón Valur Sigurðsson	(Germany) VfL Gummersbach	64
9.	(Belarus) Sergei Gorbok	(Slovenia) Celje	60
9.	(France) Daniel Narcisse	(Germany) VfL Gummersbach	60
