= 2008–09 EHF Champions League =

European handball tournament

EHF Champions League
- 2008–09

Tournament information
- Sport: Handball
- Dates: 6 September 2008–31 May 2009
- Administrator: EHF
- Teams: 24 (group stage); 32 (qualifying)

Final positions
- Champions: (Spain) BM Ciudad Real
- Runner-up: (Germany) THW Kiel

Tournament statistics
- Top scorer: (Czech Republic) Filip Jícha (99)

The Champions League 2008–09 is the season of EHF Champions League. BM Ciudad Real won their second title in a row, beating THW Kiel in the final. This was the second year in a row that the final had been between Ciudad Real and THW Kiel.

== Teams ==
(Spain) Ciudad Real	(Spain) Ademar León	(Spain) Barcelona	(Spain) San Antonio
(Germany) Kiel	(Germany) Flensburg-Handewitt	(Germany) Hamburg	(Russia) Chekhovskiye Medvedi
(France) Chambéry Savoie	(France) Montpellier	(Sweden) Hammarby	(Croatia) Zagreb
(Denmark) FC København	(Denmark) Svendborg	(Ukraine) Zaporizhzhia	(Slovenia) Celje
(Slovenia) Koper	(Hungary) MKB Veszprém	(Hungary) Pick Szeged	(Bosnia and Herzegovina) Bosna Sarajevo
(Norway) Drammen	(Slovakia) Tatran Prešov	(Switzerland) Amicitia Zürich	(Poland) Wisła Płock

== Qualification round ==
Team 1	Agg.	Team 2	1st leg	2nd leg
Granitas Kaunas (Lithuania)	–	(Belarus) HC Meshkov Brest	27–27	32–32
A.C. Doukas School (Greece)	–	(Estonia) Põlva Serviti	35–23	19–26
Izmir (Turkey)	–	(North Macedonia) RK Metalurg Skopje	29–33	31–34
RK Crvena Zvezda (Serbia)	–	(Italy) Casarano	26–21	25–27
HCM Constanța (Romania)	–	(Belgium) KV Sasja HC	38–25	36–31
Chypre College (Cyprus)	–	(Iceland) Haukar Hafnarfjördur	30–31	30–34
Benfica Lisbon (Portugal)	–	(Austria) A1 Bregenz	38–34	28–35
HB Dudelange (Luxembourg)	–	(Germany) Rhein-Neckar Löwen	16–41	15–46

== Group stage ==
=== Group A ===
Pos	Team	Pts	Pld	W	D	L	GF	GA	GD
1	(France) Chambéry SH	10	6	5	0	1	200	155	+45
2	(Slovenia) Celje	8	6	4	0	2	202	166	+36
3	(Sweden) Hammarby IF	6	6	3	0	3	158	176	−18
4	(Lithuania) Granitas Kaunas	0	6	0	0	6	156	219	−63

4 October	Hammarby IF	31	27	Granitas Kaunas
5 October	Chambéry SH	37	30	Celje
11 October	Celje	35	22	Hammarby IF
11 October	Granitas-Karys	32	42	Chambéry SH
16 October	Granitas Kaunas	21	37	Celje
19 October	Chambéry SH	31	18	Hammarby IF
8 November	Hammarby IF	27	31	Celje
9 November	Chambéry SH	34	21	Granitas Kaunas
13 November	Granitas Kaunas	28	31	Hammarby IF
16 November	Celje	25	32	Chambéry SH
22 November	Hammarby IF	29	24	Chambéry SH
22 November	Celje	44	27	Granitas Kaunas

=== Group B ===
Pos	Team	Pts	Pld	W	D	L	GF	GA	GD
1	(Spain) BM Ciudad Real	12	6	6	0	0	228	135	+93
2	(Denmark) GOG Svendborg	6	6	3	0	3	176	173	+3
3	(Bosnia and Herzegovina) RK Bosna Sarajevo	5	6	2	1	3	157	172	−15
4	(Greece) A.C. Doukas	1	6	0	1	5	126	207	−81

4 October	RK Bosna Sarajevo	34	22	A.C. Doukas
5 October	GOG Svendborg	24	34	BM Ciudad Real
12 October	A.C. Doukas	23	41	GOG Svendborg
12 October	BM Ciudad Real	40	24	RK Bosna Sarajevo
18 October	A.C. Doukas	21	42	Ciudad Real
19 October	GOG Svendborg	30	26	RK Bosna Sarajevo
8 November	RK Bosna Sarajevo	21	34	BM Ciudad Real
9 November	GOG Svendborg	29	21	A.C. Doukas
16 November	A.C. Doukas	20	20	RK Bosna Sarajevo
16 November	BM Ciudad Real	37	26	GOG Svendborg
22 November	RK Bosna Sarajevo	32	26	GOG Svendborg
23 November	BM Ciudad Real	41	19	A.C. Doukas

=== Group C ===
Pos	Team	Pts	Pld	W	D	L	GF	GA	GD
1	(Germany) THW Kiel	12	6	6	0	0	210	164	+46
2	(Spain) FC Barcelona	8	6	4	0	2	179	156	+23
3	(North Macedonia) Metalurg	4	6	2	0	4	157	172	−15
4	(Norway) Drammen HK	0	6	0	0	6	154	208	−54

2 October	THW Kiel	37	29	Metalurg
4 October	Drammen HK	24	29	FC Barcelona
8 October	Drammen HK	29	39	THW Kiel
12 October	FC Barcelona	30	19	Metalurg
18 October	Metalurg	37	30	Drammen HK
19 October	FC Barcelona	27	31	THW Kiel
5 November	THW Kiel	40	28	Drammen HK
8 November	Metalurg	22	29	FC Barcelona
13 November	Metalurg	25	30	THW Kiel
16 November	FC Barcelona	38	27	Drammen HK
23 November	Drammen HK	16	25	Metalurg
23 November	THW Kiel	33	26	FC Barcelona

=== Group D ===
Pos	Team	Pts	Pld	W	D	L	GF	GA	GD
1	(Germany) HSV Hambourg	12	6	6	0	0	204	153	+51
2	(Denmark) FCK Håndbold	8	6	4	0	2	196	171	+25
3	(Slovakia) Tatran Prešov	4	6	2	0	4	165	183	−18
4	(Serbia) RK Crvena Zvezda	0	6	0	0	6	146	204	−58

2 October	HSV Hamburg	32	20	Tatran Prešov
5 October	RK Crvena Zvezda	25	34	FCK Håndbold
11 October	FCK Håndbold	31	34	HSV Hambourg
11 October	Tatran Prešov	27	23	RK Crvena Zvezda
15 October	RK Crvena Zvezda	22	38	HSV Hambourg
18 October	Tatran Prešov	32	33	FCK Håndbold
5 November	HSV Hambourg	29	27	FCK Håndbold
9 November	RK Crvena Zvezda	27	'31	Tatran Prešov
15 November	FCK Håndbold	38	22	RK Crvena Zvezda
16 November	Tatran Prešov	26	35	HSV Hambourg
22 November	FCK Håndbold	33	29	Tatran Prešov
23 November	HSV Hambourg	36	27	RK Crvena Zvezda

=== Group E ===
Pos	Team	Pts	Pld	W	D	L	GF	GA	GD
1	(Russia) Chehovskie Medvedi	8	6	4	0	2	191	172	+19
2	(Spain) Portland San Antonio	8	6	4	0	2	186	179	+7
3	(Romania) Steaua Bucharest	6	6	3	0	3	171	182	−11
4	(Slovenia) RK Koper	2	6	1	0	5	173	188	−15

2 October	Portland San Antonio	38	30	Steaua Bucarest
4 October	RK Koper	28	35	Chehovskie Medvedi
9 October	Chehovskie Medvedi	34	26	Portland San Antonio
12 October	Steaua Bucarest	28	26	RK Koper
18 October	RK Koper	31	29	Portland San Antonio
19 October	Steaua Bucarest	34	32	Chehovskie Medvedi
8 November	RK Koper	29	30	Steaua Bucarest
8 November	Portland San Antonio	33	27	Chehovskie Medvedi
15 November	Chehovskie Medvedi	35	30	RK Koper
16 November	Steaua Bucarest	28	29	Portland San Antonio
22 November	Portland San Antonio	31	29	RK Koper
23 November	Chehovskie Medvedi	28	21	Steaua Bucarest

=== Group F ===
Pos	Team	Pts	Pld	W	D	L	GF	GA	GD
1	(Germany) SG Flensburg	10	6	5	0	1	195	158	+37
2	(Hungary) KC Veszprém	8	6	4	0	2	183	159	+24
3	(Iceland) Haukar Hafnarfjördur	4	6	2	0	4	147	181	−34
4	(Ukraine) ZTR Zaporizhzhia	2	6	1	0	5	144	171	−27

5 October	Haukar Hafnarfjördur	26	25	ZTR Zaporizhzhia
5 October	KC Veszprém	29	28	SG Flensburg
9 October	SG Flensburg	35	29	Haukar Hafnarfjördur
11 October	ZTR Zaporizhzhia	25	32	KC Veszprém
16 October	SG Flensburg	38	20	ZTR Zaporizhzhia
19 October	Haukar Hafnarfjördur	27	26	KC Veszprém
8 November	KC Veszprém	33	22	ZTR Zaporizhzhia
8 November	Haukar Hafnarfjördur	25	35	SG Flensburg
15 November	ZTR Zaporizhzhia	26	15	Haukar Hafnarfjördur
16 November	SG Flensburg	32	29	KC Veszprém
22 November	ZTR Zaporizhzhia	26	27	SG Flensburg
22 November	KC Veszprém	34	25	Haukar Hafnarfjördur

=== Group G ===
Pos	Team	Pts	Pld	W	D	L	GF	GA	GD
1	(Spain) Ademar León	9	6	4	1	1	198	177	+21
2	(France) Montpellier HB	9	6	4	1	1	196	176	+20
3	(Switzerland) Zurich	5	6	2	1	3	185	185	0
4	(Austria) A1 Bregenz	1	6	0	1	5	170	211	−41

5 October	Zurich	35	25	A1 Bregenz
5 October	Ademar León	25	21	Montpellier HB
11 October	A1 Bregenz	30	34	Ademar León
12 October	Montpellier HB	36	29	Zurich
18 October	A1 Bregenz	32	34	Montpellier HB
19 October	Ademar León	39	33	Zurich
9 November	Zurich	27	28	'Montpellier HB
9 November	Ademar León	37	26	A1 Bregenz
15 November	A1 Bregenz	28	28	Zurich
16 November	Montpellier HB	34	34	Ademar León
23 November	Zurich	33	29	Ademar León
23 November	Montpellier HB	43	29	A1 Bregenz

=== Group H ===
Pos	Team	Pts	Pld	W	D	L	GF	GA	GD
1	(Germany) Rhein-Neckar	10	6	4	2	0	198	160	+38
2	(Croatia) RK Zagreb	10	6	4	2	0	186	156	+30
3	(Hungary) Pick Szeged	4	6	2	0	4	159	161	−2
4	(Poland) Wisła Płock	0	6	0	0	6	122	188	−66

4 October	Rhein-Neckar	33	33	RK Zagreb
5 October	Wisła Płock	16	26	Pick Szeged
12 October	Pick Szeged	24	28	Rhein-Neckar
12 October	RK Zagreb	34	17	Plock
16 October	Rhein-Neckar	38	25	Wisła Płock
18 October	Pick Szeged	30	36	RK Zagreb
8 November	Wisła Płock	24	27	RK Zagreb
9 November	Rhein-Neckar	35	28	Pick Szeged
13 November	Rhein-Neckar	27	27	RK Zagreb
15 November	Pick Szeged	26	17	Wisła Płock
20 November	Wisła Płockv	23	37	Rhein-Neckar
22 November	RK Zagreb	29	25	Pick Szeged

== Main round ==
=== Group 1 ===
Pos	Team	Pts	Pld	W	D	L	GF	GA	GD
1	(Germany) HSV Hambourg	10	6	5	0	1	185	169	+16
2	(Russia) Chehovskie Medvedi	6	6	3	0	3	196	190	+6
3	(Spain) Portland San Antonio	6	6	3	0	3	174	174	0
4	(Denmark) FCK Håndbold	0 (Note: 2 points deducted?)	6	1	0	5	180	202	−22

Notes:

9 October	Chehovskie Medvedi	34	26	Portland San Antonio
11 October	FCK Håndbold	31	34	HSV Hambourg
5 November	HSV Hambourg	29	27	FCK Håndbold
8 November	Portland San Antonio	33	27	Chehovskie Medvedi
11 February	HSV Hambourg	34	23	Portland San Antonio
14 February	FCK Håndbold	33	37	Chehovskie Medvedi
18 February	Chehovskie Medvedi	30	32	HSV Hambourg
21 February	Portland San Antonio	38	27	FCK Håndbold
26 February	Chehovskie Medvedi	37	34	FCK Håndbold
1 March	Portland San Antonio	27	24	HSV Hambourg
4 March	HSV Hambourg	32	31	Chehovskie Medvedi
7 March	FCK Håndbold	28	27	Portland San Antonio

=== Group 2 ===
Pos	Team	Pts	Pld	W	D	L	GF	GA	GD
1	(Germany) Rhein-Neckar	8	6	3	2	1	188	164	+24
2	(Croatia) RK Zagreb	8	6	3	2	1	176	158	+18
3	(France) Chambéry SH	8	6	4	0	2	177	178	−1
4	(Slovenia) Celje	0	6	0	0	6	149	190	−41

4 October	RK Zagreb	33	33	Rhein-Neckar
5 October	Chambéry SH	37	30	Celje
13 November	Rhein-Neckar	27	27	RK Zagreb
16 November	Celje	25	32	Chambéry SH
14 February	RK Zagreb	30	32	Chambéry SH
14 February	Celje	28	34	Rhein-Neckar
18 February	Chambéry SH	25	23	Rhein-Neckar
21 February	Celje	22	25	Zagreb
26 February	Rhein-Neckar	31	26	Celje
28 February	Chambéry SH	26	30	Zagreb
7 March	Zagreb	31	18	Celje
8 March	Rhein-Neckar	40	25	Chambéry SH

=== Group 3 ===
Pos	Team	Pts	Pld	W	D	L	GF	GA	GD
1	(Hungary) KC Veszprém	8	6	4	0	2	170	163	+7
2	(Germany) SG Flensburg	6	6	3	0	3	170	172	−2
3	(Spain) CB Ademar León	5	6	2	1	3	177	178	−1
4	(France) Montpellier HB	5	6	2	1	3	154	158	−4

5 October	KC Veszprém	29	28	SG Flensburg
5 October	CB Ademar León	25	21	Montpellier HB
16 November	Montpellier HB	34	34	CB Ademar León
16 November	SG Flensburg	32	29	KC Veszprém
14 February	KC Veszprém	28	26	CB Ademar León
15 February	Montpellier HB	31	25	SG Flensburg
22 February	SG Flensburg	31	26	CB Ademar León
22 February	Montpellier HB	24	30	KC Veszprém
28 February	CB Ademar León	30	32	KC Veszprém
1 March	SG Flensburg	22	21	Montpellier HB
7 March	KC Veszprém	22	23	Montpellier HB
8 March	CB Ademar León	36	32	SG Flensburg

=== Group 4 ===
Pos	Team	Pts	Pld	W	D	L	GF	GA	GD
1	(Germany) THW Kiel	10	6	5	0	1	210	174	+36
2	(Spain) BM Ciudad Real	10	6	5	0	1	195	173	+22
3	(Spain) FC Barcelona	4	6	2	0	4	181	183	−2
4	(Denmark) GOG Svendborg	0	6	0	0	6	166	222	−56

5 October	GOG Svendborg	24	34	BM Ciudad Real
19 October	FC Barcelona	27	31	THW Kiel
16 November	BM Ciudad Real	37	26	GOG Svendborg
23 November	THW Kiel	33	26	FC Barcelona
14 February	FC Barcelona	28	31	BM Ciudad Real
15 February	GOG Svendborg	31	43	THW Kiel
22 February	THW Kiel	33	26	BM Ciudad Real
22 February	FC Barcelona	36	27	GOG Svendborg
25 February	THW Kiel	37	29	GOG Svendborg
1 March	BM Ciudad Real	32	29	FC Barcelona
7 March	BM Ciudad Real	35	33	THW Kiel
8 March	GOG Svendborg	29	35	FC Barcelona

== Knockout stage ==
=== Quarterfinals ===
Team 1	Agg.	Team 2	1st leg	2nd leg
RK Zagreb (Croatia)	55–59	(Germany) THW Kiel	28–28	27–31
BM Ciudad Real (Spain)	58–56	(Hungary) KC Veszprém	29–24	29–32
SG Flensburg Handewitt (Germany)	56–57	(Germany) HSV Hambourg	25–28	31–29
Chehovskie Medvedi (Russia)	61–67	(Germany) Rhein-Neckar Löwen	33–31	28–36

=== Semifinals ===
Team 1	Agg.	Team 2	1st leg	2nd leg
Rhein-Neckar Löwen (Germany)	54–67	(Germany) THW Kiel	23–37	31–30
BM Ciudad Real (Spain)	63–60	(Germany) HSV Hambourg	30–29	33–31

=== Final ===
Team 1	Agg.	Team 2	1st leg	2nd leg
THW Kiel (Germany)	66–67	(Spain) BM Ciudad Real	39–34	27–33

== Top scorers ==
	Player	Club	Goals
1	(Czech Republic) Filip Jicha	(Germany) THW Kiel	99
2	(North Macedonia) Kiril Lazarov	(Croatia) RK Zagreb	93
3	(Serbia) Marko Vujin	(Hungary) KC Veszprém	89
4	(Slovenia) Vid Kavticnik	(Germany) THW Kiel	77
5	(Iceland) Gudjon Valur Sigurdsson	(Germany) Rhein-Neckar Löwen	76
6	(Czech Republic) Jan Filip	(Germany) Rhein-Neckar Löwen	75
7	(Sweden) Jonas Källman	(Spain) BM Ciudad Real	74
8	(Denmark) Lars Christiansen	(Germany) SG Flensburg	73
9	(Poland) Mariusz Jurasik	(Germany) Rhein-Neckar Löwen	72
10	(Sweden) Fredrik Petersen	(Denmark) GOG Svendborg	70
