= BM Ciudad Real =

Spanish handball club

Renovalia Ciudad Real
- Full name: Agrupación Deportiva Cultural; Balonmano Ciudad Real
- Founded: 1983
- Dissolved: 2011
- Arena: Quijote Arena, Ciudad Real, Castile-La Mancha, Spain
- Capacity: 5,200
- President: (Spain) Domingo Díaz de Mera
- League: Liga ASOBAL
- 2010–11: 2nd
Home	Away

Balonmano Ciudad Real was a Spanish handball team based in Ciudad Real, Castilla La Mancha. BM Ciudad Real played in Liga ASOBAL.

== History ==
In July 1983 is founded in the city of Ciudad Real a handball club named Asociación Deportiva Cultural Caserío Vigón. In 1993, other Ciudad Real-based team, Asociación Deportiva Cultural Ciudad Real purchase the rights of ADC Caserío Vigón and renames the team as Balonmano Ciudad Real.

In the 2000's it became one of the strongest teams in Spain with 5 Spanish Champions and 3 Champions Leagues.

=== Relocation ===
In 2011, BM Ciudad Real was relocated to Madrid under the new name BM Atlético de Madrid for financial reasions. It was finally dissolved two years later. The club Club Balonmano Caserío Ciudad Real was created on 27 July 2011 by fan associations of BM Ciudad Real as a replacement club.

=== Club names ===
- Agrupación Deportiva Cultural Caserio Vigón – (1983–1993)
- Agrupación Deportiva Cultural Ciudad Real – (1993–2011)

== Trophies ==
- Liga ASOBAL: 5
  - Winners: 2003–04, 2006–07, 2007–08, 2008–09 & 2009–10
  - Runners-Up: 2002–03
- EHF Champions League: 3
  - Winners: 2005–06, 2007–08, 2008–09.
  - Runners-Up: 2004–05, 2010–11
- EHF Men's Champions Trophy: 3
  - Winners: 2005, 2006 and 2008
- EHF Challenge Cup
  - Runners-Up: 1998–99
- Copa del Rey: 3
  - Winners: 2003, 2008 & 2011
  - Runners-Up: 2001, 2002, 2004, 2006
- ASOBAL Cup: 6
  - Winners: 2004, 2005, 2006, 2007, 2008 & 2011
- Supercopa ASOBAL: 3
  - Winners: 2005, 2008 & 2011
  - Runners-Up: 2004
- City Cup
  - Runners-Up: 1999
- EHF Cup Winner's Cup: 2
  - Winners: 2002, 2003
- IHF Super Globe: 2
  - Winners: 2007, 2010
  - Runners-Up: 2011
- Double: 1
  - Winners: 2007–08

== Statistics 2010/11 ==
Liga ASOBAL	Position	Pts	P	W	D	L	F	A
BM Ciudad Real	2nd	54	30	27	0	3	986	777

== Stadium information ==
- Name: – Quijote Arena
- City: – Ciudad Real
- Capacity: – 5,200
- Address: – Polígono Industrial Larache.

== Notable coaches ==
- Veselin Vujović
- Talant Duyshebaev

== Famous players ==
- (Spain) José Javier Hombrados
- (Spain) Jordi Núñez
- (Spain) Antonio Muñoz Villanueva
- (Spain) Santi Urdiales
- (Spain) Angel Hermida
- (Spain) Javier Valenzuela
- (Spain) Xabier Mikel Rekondo
- (Spain) Talant Duyshebaev
- (Croatia) Mirza Džomba
- (Iceland) Ólafur Stefánsson
- (Spain) Iker Romero
- (Spain) Julen Aguinagalde
- (Croatia) Petar Metličić
- (Spain) Joan Cañellas
- (Slovenia) Uroš Zorman
- (Egypt) Hussein Zaky
- (Slovenia) Aleš Pajovič
- (Romania) Gheorghe Covaciu
- (France) Didier Dinart
- (Sweden) Jonas Källman
- (Spain) David Davis
- (Spain) Alberto Entrerríos
- (Belarus) / (Slovenia) Siarhei Rutenka
- (North Macedonia) Kiril Lazarov
- (Spain) Isaías Guardiola
- (Poland) Mariusz Jurkiewicz
- (Argentina) Eric Gull
- (Spain) Chema Rodríguez
- (France) Luc Abalo
- (France) Jérôme Fernandez
- (Cuba) / (Spain) Rolando Uríos
- (Bosnia and Herzegovina) Senjanin Maglajlija
- (Cuba) / (Spain) Julio Fis
- (Denmark) Torsten Laen
- (Denmark) Claus Møller Jakobsen
- (Russia) Sergey Pogorelov
- (Denmark) Christian Hjermind
- (Serbia and Montenegro) / (Spain) Arpad Šterbik
- (Spain) Viran Morros
- (Russia) Egor Evdokimov
