= HC ZTR Zaporizhzhia =

Ukrainian handball club

- Full name: Handball Club Zaporozhtransformator Zaporizhzhia
- Short name: ZTR
- Founded: 1966; 60 years ago
- Arena: Iounost Sport Hall, Zaporizhzhia
- Capacity: 2,500
- Club colours

ZTR Zaporizhzhia is a team handball club from Zaporizhzhia, Ukraine. Currently, ZTR Zaporizhzhia competes in the Ukrainian Men's Handball Super League. The club was previously called ZYY and ZeMtY.

The club was renamed ZTR Zaporizhzhia in 1992.

== History ==
Handball Club ZTR (previously called ZYY and ZeMtY) was established in 1966 on the basis of Zaporizhzhia branch of Dnipropetrovsk metallurgy institute. In 1992 Zaporizhzhia Transformer Plant (Zaporozhtransformator) became a sponsor of the club, which was renamed to "ZTR".

== Accomplishments ==
- EHF Cup: 1
  - Winner: 1983
  - Finalist: 1985
- Ukrainian Men's Handball Super League 14
  - Champion: 1993, 1995, 1998, 1999, 2000, 2001, 2003, 2004, 2005, 2007, 2008, 2009, 2010, 2011
  - Runner-up (9) : 1996, 1997, 2002, 2006, 2013, 2015, 2016, 2017, 2018
- Ukrainian Handball Cup: 3
  - Winner: 2001, 2011, 2014
- Soviet Men's Handball Championship
  - Runner-up : 1971

== European record ==
Season	Competition	Round	Club	1st leg	2nd leg	Aggregate
2016–17	EHF Cup	R1	(Moldova) HC Olimpus-85 USEFS	37–28	40–21	77–49
2016–17	EHF Cup	R2	(Switzerland) Wacker Thun	23–22	22–22	45–44
2016–17	EHF Cup	R3	(Spain) Fraikin Granollers	29–27	28–30	57–57

== Notable players ==
- (Soviet Union) / (Ukraine) Serhiy Kushniryuk
- (Soviet Union) / (Ukraine) Oleksandr Rezanov
- (Soviet Union) / (Ukraine) Mykhaylo Ishchenko
- (Soviet Union) / (Ukraine) Yuriy Lahutyn
- (Soviet Union) / (Ukraine) Mykola Tomyn
- (Ukraine) Vitaliy Nat
- (Ukraine) Sergiy Onufriyenko (–2009)
- (Russia) / (Ukraine) Evgeny Budko
- (Ukraine) Sergii Burka
- Yuriy Petrenko
- (Russia) / (Ukraine) Sergey Shelmenko
- (Spain) / (Ukraine) Andrei Xepkin
- (Belarus) / (Russia) Sergei Gorbok
- (Belarus) Ivan Brouka
- (Ukraine) Andrii Akimenko
