= HC Dukla Prague =

Czech handball club

HC Dukla Praha
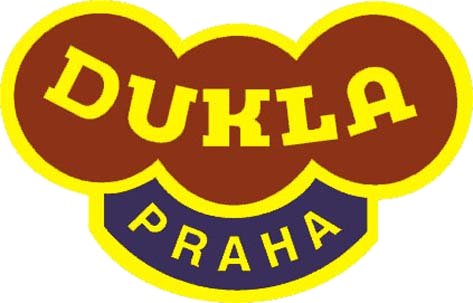
- Full name: Handball Club Dukla Praha
- Short name: Dukla Praha
- Founded: 1948; 78 years ago
- Arena: Sport Center Řepy
- Capacity: 400
- Head coach: Daniel Kubeš
- League: Chance Extraliga
- Club colours

HC Dukla Prague (Czech: HC Dukla Praha) is a handball club from Prague, Czech Republic, that plays in the Chance Extraliga.

Location of HC Dukla Prague

== History ==
Originally it was a part of a Czechoslovak army sports club supporting several different sports teams, including football, which was founded in 1948 as ATK Praha and later renamed Dukla Prague. The handball team of Dukla Praha was the most successful Czechoslovak handball team. They won the Czechoslovak handball league 28 times, and the Czech handball championship three times after the dissolution of Czechoslovakia. In 1957, 1963 and 1984 they won the European Champions' Cup (now EHF Champions League) and in 1967 and 1968 they finished in the finals. In 1982 they reached the final of the EHF Cup Winners' Cup. In 1963 they were awarded the team trophy of the Czechoslovak Sportsperson of the Year.

== Crest, colours, supporters ==
=== Kits ===
HOME
2011–13	2013–15	2015–16	2016–18

AWAY
2014–15	2015–16	2016–18

THIRD

2015–16

== Team ==
=== Current squad ===
Squad for the 2025-26 season

HC Dukla Praha

Goalkeepers

- 1 (Czech Republic) Daniel Rangl
- 12 (Czech Republic) Jakub Votava
- 61 (Czech Republic) Karel Šmíd

Left Wingers

- 3 (Czech Republic) Daniel Sanislo
- 6 (Czech Republic) Jiří Vojtela
- 14 (Czech Republic) Jan Blecha
- 25 (Czech Republic) Jiří Rakouský

Right Wingers

- 18 (Czech Republic) Jakub Krušberský
- 93 (Czech Republic) Martin Hrubý

Line Players

- 8 (Czech Republic) Kristián Duda
- 36 (Slovakia) Matúš Moravčík

Central Backs

- 9 (Czech Republic) Jakub Sviták
- 2 (Czech Republic) Ondřej Šubrt
- 34 (Czech Republic) Lukáš Melich

Left Backs

- 7 (Czech Republic) Jonáš Josef
- 35 (Czech Republic) Martin Březina
- 48 (Czech Republic) Mikuláš Kabátník

Right Backs

- 15 (Czech Republic) Daniel Erebai
- 32 (Czech Republic) Ondřej Kulhánek
- 37 (Czech Republic) Martin Rakouský

=== Technical staff ===
- Head Coach: (Czech Republic) Daniel Kubeš
- Responsible Manager: (Czech Republic) Jiří Pokorný
- Physiotherapist: (Czech Republic) Jiří Neumann
- Team Doctor: (Czech Republic) Vítězslav Ježek

=== Transfers ===
Transfers for the 2026–27 season

Joining

Leaving

- (Czech Republic) Jonáš Josef (LB) to (Germany) SG BBM Bietigheim
- (Czech Republic) Martin Březina (CB) to (Germany) Dessau-Roßlauer HV

=== Transfer History ===
Transfers for the 2025–26 season

Joining

- (Czech Republic) Martin Březina (CB) from (Switzerland) HSC Kreuzlingen
- (Czech Republic) Daniel Rangl (GK) from (Czech Republic) Sokol Vršovice

Leaving

== Accomplishments ==
  - EHF Champions League:
  - Gold: 1957, 1963, 1984
  - Silver: 1967, 1968
  - Bronze: 1962, 1966, 1980, 1985
  - EHF Cup:
  - Bronze: 1990
  - Czech Handball Extraliga:
  - Gold: 1994, 2011, 2017
  - Silver: 1996, 2003, 2007, 2012, 2016
  - Bronze: 1997, 1999, 2005, 2008, 2009, 2010, 2013, 2018, 2025
  - Czechoslovakia Handball League:
  - Gold: 1950, 1953, 1954, 1955, 1956, 1958, 1959, 1961, 1962, 1963, 1964, 1965, 1966, 1967, 1970, 1977, 1979, 1980, 1982, 1983, 1984, 1985, 1986, 1987, 1988, 1990, 1991, 1992
  - Silver: 1960, 1968, 1969, 1978, 1981
  - Bronze: 1971, 1975, 1989

== European record ==
=== European Cup and Champions League ===
Season	Round	Club	Home	Away	Aggregate
1956–57; Winners	Quarter-finals	(Romania) Dinamo București	24–19	x	24–19
1956–57; Winners	Semi-finals	(Denmark) HG København	25–18	x	25–18
1956–57; Winners	Finals	(Sweden) Örebro SK	21–13		
1962–63; Winners	Round of 16	(Germany) THW Kiel	18–12	x	18–12
1962–63; Winners	Quarter-finals	(East Germany) SC DHfK Leipzig	21–11	9–14	30–25
1962–63; Winners	Semi-finals	(Germany) Frisch Auf Göppingen	24–14	9–7	33–21
1962–63; Winners	Finals	(Romania) Dinamo București	15–13		
1983–84; Winners	Round 2	(Netherlands) Vlug en Lenig Geleen	33–18	23–20	56–38
1983–84; Winners	Quarter-finals	(Switzerland) TV Zofingen	18–15	25–23	43–38
1983–84; Winners	Semi-finals	(Germany) VfL Gummersbach	18–17	14–14	32–31
1983–84; Winners	Finals	(Socialist Federal Republic of Yugoslavia) RK Metaloplastika	21–17	17–21	38–38 (4-2 Pen.)

=== EHF ranking ===
As of 19/2/2023

Rank	Team	Points
36	(Norway) Nærbø IL	149
37	(France) PAUC Handball	144
38	(Sweden) IK Sävehof	143
39	(Czech Republic) HC Dukla Prague	143
40	(Romania) CS Minaur Baia Mare	140
41	(Sweden) IFK Kristianstad	137
42	(Spain) BM Logroño La Rioja	133

== Former club members ==
=== Notable former players ===
- (Czech Republic) Michal Barda (1979–1987)
- (Czech Republic) Tomáš Bartek (1977–1988)
- (Czech Republic) Petr Baumruk (1981–1990)
- (Czech Republic) Roman Bečvář (1986–1992)
- (Czech Republic) Ladislav Beneš (1962–1979)
- (Czech Republic) Milan Berka (1998–2000)
- (Czech Republic) Bohumil Cepák (1970–1972)
- (Czech Republic) Bedřich Ciner (1960–1962)
- (Czech Republic) Václav Duda (1959–1975)
- (Czech Republic) Václav Eret (1950–1951)
- (Czech Republic) Jan Filip (1991–1997, 1998–1999)
- (Czech Republic) Miroslav Frank (1981–1983)
- (Czech Republic) Vladimír Haber (1969–1971)
- (Czech Republic) Rudolf Havlík (1956–1973)
- (Czech Republic) František Heřman (1958–1960)
- (Czech Republic) Radek Horák (2007–2012)
- (Czech Republic) Petr Hrubý (1996–2004)
- (Czech Republic) Jiří Hynek (2002–2005)
- (Czech Republic) Petr Házl (1991–1995)
- (Czech Republic) Vladimír Jarý (1968–1970)
- (Czech Republic) Filip Jícha (2000–2003)
- (Czech Republic) Karel Jindřichovský (1986–1994)
- (Czech Republic) Jiří Kavan (1966–1979)
- (Czech Republic) Matěj Klíma (2016–2021)
- (Czech Republic) Jaroslav Konečný (1964–1966)
- (Czech Republic) Bedřich König (1951–1976)
- (Czech Republic) Jiří Kotrč (1978–1990, 1994–1996)
- (Czech Republic) Milan Kotrč (2007–2017)
- (Czech Republic) Martin Kovář (1997–1999)
- (Czech Republic) Jindřich Krepindl (1968–1970)
- (Czech Republic) Daniel Kubeš (1996–2001)
- (Czech Republic) Jan Landa (2005–2011)
- (Czech Republic) Martin Lehocký (2006–2013)
- (Czech Republic) Jiří Liška (1971–1984)
- (Czech Republic) Vojtěch Mareš (1959–1971)
- (Czech Republic) Pavel Mikeš (1970–1972)
- (Czech Republic) Dieudonné Mubenzem (2014–2018)
- (Czech Republic) Radek Musil (1995–2001)
- (Czech Republic) Karel Nocar (1998–1999, 2002–2003)
- (Czech Republic) Jan Novák (1981–1990)
- (Czech Republic) Zdeněk Pešl (1951–1953)
- (Czech Republic) Bohumír Prokop (1987–1992, 1996–1997)
- (Czech Republic) Jaroslav Provazník (1957–1958)
- (Czech Republic) Jaroslav Rážek (1961–1971)
- (Czech Republic) Ivan Satrapa (1965–1980)
- (Czech Republic) Martin Šetlík (1992–1994)
- (Czech Republic) Zdeněk Škára (1973–1974)
- (Czech Republic) Jaroslav Škarvan (1964–1978)
- (Czech Republic) Miloš Slabý (1989–2000)
- (Czech Republic) Libor Sovadina (1986–1990)
- (Czech Republic) Oldřich Spáčil (1952–1962)
- (Czech Republic) Jan Stehlík (2005–2009)
- (Czech Republic) František Štika (1976–1984)
- (Czech Republic) Jan Štochl (2002–2005)
- (Czech Republic) Petr Štochl (2000–2001)
- (Czech Republic) Václav Straka (2007–2008)
- (Czech Republic) Jakub Sviták (2010–)
- (Czech Republic) Michal Tonar (1988–1990)
- (Czech Republic) Zdeněk Vaněk (1987–1992)
- (Czech Republic) Jan Větrovec (2003–2006)
- (Czech Republic) Jiří Vícha (1950–1985)
- (Czech Republic) Jiří Vítek (1996–1999)
- (Czech Republic) Václav Vraný (2004–2007)
- (Slovakia) Milan Brestovanský (1979–1981)
- (Slovakia) Peter Dávid (1986–1988)
- (Slovakia) Milan Folta (1987–1988)
- (Slovakia) Anton Frolo (1957–1959)
- (Slovakia) Rudolf Horváth (1966–1968)
- (Slovakia) Peter Kakaščík (1990–1991)
- (Slovakia) Maroš Kolpak (1993–1995)
- (Slovakia) Peter Mesiarik (1982–1984)
- (Slovakia) Richard Štochl (2001)
- (Czech Republic) Martin Putinec Půta

=== Former coaches ===
Seasons	Coach	Country
2021-2024	Michal Tonar	(Czech Republic)
2024-	Daniel Kubeš	(Czech Republic)
