= 2010–11 Scottish handball season =

All competitive handball in Scotland is sanctioned and organised by the Scottish Handball Association.

== Points system ==
For this season a new points system has been adopted for both the men's and women's leagues:

- 3 Points for a Win
- 2 Points for a Draw
- 1 Point for a Defeat by 10 goals or less
- 0 Points for a Defeat greater than 10 goals

== Venues ==
- Blackburn Community Centre, West Lothian Directions

Will host Men's and Ladies League Games as well as the 1st Round of the Scottish Cup

- Ravnescraig Leisure Centre, Motherwell Directions

Will host Men's League Games, The Scottish Cup Finals and one round of the Ladies League

- Strathclyde University Sports Centre, Glasgow Directions

Will host one round of the Men's League

== Men's League 2010/11 ==
This season six teams will compete for the League Title:

- Dumfries Handball Club
- EK82 Handball Club
- Gracemount Handball Club
- Glasgow Handball Club
- Liberton handball Club
- Tryst 77 Handball Club

=== Men's League fixtures ===
==== Week One ====
16/10/2010 @ Blackburn

Throw Off	Home	Away	Score
1:15pm	Glasgow HC	EK82 HC	56-22
2:45pm	Gracemount HC	Liberton HC	44-33
4.15pm	Tryst 77 HC	Dumfries HC	57-13

http://issuu.com/britishhandball/docs/handball_news__oct_20_2010

==== Week Two ====
23/10/2010 @ Ravenscraig

Throw Off	Home	Away	Score
12:15pm	Glasgow HC	Liberton HC	36-26
1:30pm	Tryst 77 HC	EK82 HC	32-14
3pm	Gracemount HC	Dumfries HC	50-14

- Liberton lost by less than 10 Goals, 1 bonus point awarded.

http://issuu.com/britishhandball/docs/handball_news__oct_27_2010

==== Week Three ====
20/11/2010 @ Ravenscraig

Throw Off	Home	Away	Score
29/1/11 - 2:30 pm @ Tryst	Gracemount HC	Tryst 77 HC	31-30
1:30pm	Glasgow HC	Dumfries HC	39-8
3pm	EK82 HC	Liberton HC	11-30

==== Week Four ====
13/02/2011 @ Blackburn

Throw Off	Home	Away	Score
9:15am	Liberton HC	Dumfries HC	10-0
10:45am	Glasgow HC	Tryst 77 HC	23-31
12:15pm	Gracemount HC	EK82 HC	41-20

==== Week Five ====
11/12/2010 @ Strathclyde University

Throw Off	Home	Away	Score
11am	EK82 HC	Dumfries HC	40-17
12:30pm	Glasgow HC	Gracemount HC	34-27
2pm	Tryst 77 HC	Liberton HC	48-26

==== Week Six ====
22/01/2011 @ Ravenscraig

Throw Off	Home	Away	Score
12:15pm	Glasgow HC	EK82 HC	27-15
1:30pm	Gracemount HC	Liberton HC	37-15
3pm	Tryst 77 HC	Dumfries HC	56-8

==== Week Seven ====
05/02/2011 @ Blackburn

Throw Off	Home	Away	Score
1:15pm	Glasgow HC	Liberton HC	36-30
2:45pm	Tryst 77 HC	EK82 HC	49-23
4:15pm	Gracemount HC	Dumfries HC	67-16

==== Week Eight ====
05/03/2011 @ Blackburn

Throw Off	Home	Away	Score
1:15pm	Glasgow HC	Dumfries HC	42-14
2:45pm	Gracemount HC	Tryst 77 HC	24-37
4:15pm	EK82 HC	Liberton HC	23-30

==== Week Nine ====
19/03/2011 @ Tryst

Throw Off	Home	Away	Score
N/A	Liberton HC	Dumfries HC	10-0
12:15pm	Gracemount HC	EK82 HC	32-26
2pm	Glasgow HC	Tryst 77 HC	25-31

==== Week Ten ====
17/04/2011 @ tba

Throw Off	Home	Away	Score
2pm - Inverclyde	EK82 HC	Dumfries HC	44-23
N/A	Glasgow HC	Gracemount HC	25-25
N/A	Tryst 77 HC	Liberton HC	37-29

=== Men's League table 2010/11 ===
Team	P	W	L	D	G F	G A	G D	Pts
Tryst 77 HC	10	9	1	0	408	216	192	28
Glasgow HC	10	7	2	1	343	229	114	25
Gracemount HC	10	7	2	1	378	250	128	24
Liberton HC	10	4	6	0	239	272	-33	15
EK82 HC	10	2	8	0	238	337	-99	8
Dumfries HC	10	0	10	0	113	415	-302	0

=== Men's League statistics ===
The following statistics for the Scottish Handball League are up to and including week 10:

==== Top goalscorers ====
Player	Team	Games	Goals	Goal Average
Allan Stokes	Gracemount HC	7	63	9
Mounir Iddir	Gracemount HC	9	63	7
James Yule	Tryst 77 HC	10	61	6.1
Danos Sagias	Glasgow HC	8	59	7.3
Mark McLaughlan	Tryst 77 HC	10	47	4.7
Johnnie McAleer	Tryst 77 HC	9	45	5
Mark McGuinness	Tryst 77 HC	10	44	4.4
Bruce Hunter	Tryst 77 HC	7	42	6
Darren Fisher	Tryst 77 HC	8	42	5.25
Christian Wolf	Gracemount HC	6	38	6.3

== Ladies' League 2010/11 ==
This Season Four teams will compete for the Ladies League Title:

- East Kilbride 82 Ladies Handball Club
- Edinburgh Ladies Handball Club
- Glasgow Ladies Handball Club
- Tryst 77 Ladies Handball Club

=== Ladies' League fixtures 2010/11 ===
==== Week One ====
09/10/2010

Throw Off	Home	Away	Score
12:15pm	Glasgow Ladies HC	EK82 Ladies HC	38-19
1:30pm	Tryst 77 Ladies HC	Edinburgh Ladies HC	25-47

==== Week Two ====
16/10/2010

Throw Off	Home	Away	Score
10:15am	Glasgow Ladies HC	Tryst 77 Ladies HC	33-14
11:45am	EK82 Ladies HC	Edinburgh Ladies HC	29-35

- EK82 Ladies lost by less than 10 goals, 1 bonus point awarded

==== Week Three ====
06/11/2010

Throw Off	Home	Away	Score
10:15am	Glasgow Ladies HC	Edinburgh Ladies HC	-
11:45am	EK82 Ladies HC	Tryst 77 Ladies HC	-

==== Week Four ====
13/11/2010

Throw Off	Home	Away	Score
12:15pm	Glasgow Ladies HC	EK82 Ladies HC	-
1:30pm	Tryst 77 Ladies HC	Edinburgh Ladies HC	-

==== Week Five ====
12/12/2010

Throw Off	Home	Away	Score
12:15pm	Glasgow Ladies HC	Tryst 77 Ladies HC	-
1:30pm	EK82 Ladies HC	Edinburgh Ladies HC	-

==== Week Six ====
08/01/2011

Throw Off	Home	Away	Score
10:15am	Glasgow Ladies HC	Edinburgh Ladies HC	-
11:45am	EK82 Ladies HC	Tryst 77 Ladies HC	-

==== Week Seven ====
15/01/2011

Throw Off	Home	Away	Score
12:15pm	Glasgow Ladies HC	EK82 Ladies HC	-
1:30pm	Tryst 77 Ladies HC	Edinburgh Ladies HC	-

==== Week Eight ====
05/02/2011

Throw Off	Home	Away	Score
10:15am	EK82 Ladies HC	Edinburgh Ladies HC	-
11:45am	Glasgow Ladies HC	Tryst 77 Ladies HC	-

==== Week Nine ====
12/02/2011

Throw Off	Home	Away	Score
12:15pm	Glasgow Ladies HC	Edinburgh Ladies HC	-
1:30pm	EK82 Ladies HC	Tryst 77 Ladies HC	-

==== Week Ten ====
05/03/2011

Throw Off	Home	Away	Score
10:15 apm	Glasgow Ladies HC	EK82 Ladies HC	-
11:45am	Tryst 77 Ladies HC	Edinburgh Ladies HC	-

==== Week Eleven ====
12/03/2011

Throw Off	Home	Away	Score
12:15pm	Glasgow Ladies HC	Tryst 77 Ladies HC	-
1:30pm	EK82 Ladies HC	Edinburgh Ladies HC	-

==== Week Twelve ====
02/04/2011

Throw Off	Home	Away	Score
10:15am	EK82 Ladies HC	Tryst 77 Ladies HC	-
11:45am	Glasgow Ladies HC	Edinburgh Ladies HC	-

=== Ladies' League table 2010/11 ===
Team	P	W	L	D	G F	G A	G D	Pts
Glasgow Ladies HC	2	2	0	0	71	33	38	6
Edinburgh Ladies HC	2	2	0	0	82	54	28	6
EK82 Ladies HC	2	0	2	0	44	73	-29	1
Tryst 77 Ladies HC	2	0	2	0	39	80	-41	0

=== Ladies' League statistics ===
The following statistics for the Scottish Handball League are up to and including week 0:

==== Top goalscorers ====
Player	Team	Games	Goals
Izabella Kulis	Edinburgh Ladies	1	17
Christin Rennie	Glasgow Ladies	2	17
Sarah Carrick	Tryst 77 Ladies	2	16
Sigrid Sagen	Edinburgh Ladies	1	13
Lisa Eggebrecht	Glasgow Ladies	2	12
Nina Kirkland	Glasgow Ladies	1	10
Suzanne Caldwell	EK82 Ladies	2	9
Amanda Dingwall	Tryst 77 Ladies	2	8
Maia Jensen	Glasgow Ladies	2	7
Anna Marxen	Glasgow Ladies	2	7
Nereva Aniz	Glasgow Ladies	2	6
Cecillia Simonsen	Glasgow Ladies	2	6

==== Club disciplinary records ====
Team	Games	Cautions	2 Mins	Red Cards
EK82 Ladies HC	2	2	5	1
Glasgow Ladies HC	2	2	4	0
Edinburgh Ladies HC	2	3	10	1
Tryst 77 Ladies HC	2	5	8	1

== Scottish Cup ==
Fixtures will be posted when the draw has been made

=== 1st Round ===
02/04/2011 @ Blackburn from 1:15 pm

=== Semi-finals ===
07/05/2011 Venue and time to be confirmed

=== Final ===
21/05/2011 @ Ravenscraig time to be confirmed
