= 2011–12 Scottish handball season =

All competitive handball in Scotland is sanctioned and organised by the Scottish Handball Association.

== Points system ==
For this season a new points system has been adopted for both the men's and women's leagues:

- 3 Points for a Win
- 2 Points for a Draw
- 1 Point for a Defeat by 10 goals or less
- 0 Points for a Defeat greater than 11 goals

== Venues ==
- Blackburn Community Centre, West Lothian Directions

Will host Men's and the Scottish Cup

- Ravnescraig Leisure Centre, Motherwell Directions

Will host Men's League Games and the Scottish Cup Finals

- Tryst Sports Centre, Cumbernauld

Will host two rounds of the Men's League

== Scottish Handball Men's League 2011/12 ==
This season five teams will compete for the League Title:

- Dundee Handball Club
- Edinburgh Handball Club
- EK82 Handball Club
- Glasgow Handball Club
- Tryst 77 Handball Club

=== Men's League fixtures ===
==== Week One ====
08/10/2011 @ Blackburn

Throw Off	Home	Away	Score
2:30pm	Edinburgh HC	EK82 HC	38-23
4pm	Tryst HC	Dundee HC	34-24
Day off: Glasgow HC

- Dundee HC lost by 10 Goals, 1 bonus point awarded.

==== Week Two ====
15/10/2011 @ Blackburn

Throw Off	Home	Away	Score
1pm	Glasgow HC	Dundee HC	44-20
location/time/date: tbc	Tryst HC	EK82 HC	-
Day off: Edinburgh HC

==== Week Three ====
29/10/2011 @ Blackburn

Throw Off	Home	Away	Score
1pm	Glasgow HC	EK82 HC	26-19
2.30pm	Tryst HC	Edinburgh HC	26-18
Day off: Dundee HC

- EK82 HC & Edinburgh HC lost by less than 10 Goals, 1 bonus point awarded.

==== Week Four ====
13/11/2011 @ Ravenscraig

Throw Off	Home	Away	Score
1pm	Glasgow HC	Edinburgh HC	25-21
2.30pm	EK82 HC	Dundee HC	33-27
Day off: Tryst HC

- Dundee HC & Edinburgh HC lost by less than 10 Goals, 1 bonus point awarded.

==== Week Five ====
26/11/2011 @ Blackburn

Throw Off	Home	Away	Score
1pm	Glasgow HC	Dundee HC	27-25
2.30pm	Tryst HC	EK82 HC	26-24
Day off: Edinburgh HC

- Dundee HC & EK82 HC lost by less than 10 Goals, 1 bonus point awarded.

==== Week Six ====
03/12/2011 @ Blackburn

Throw Off	Home	Away	Score
12pm	Glasgow HC	EK82 HC	45-26
1.30pm	Tryst HC	Edinburgh HC	30-29
Day off: Dundee HC

- Edinburgh HC lost by less than 10 Goals, 1 bonus point awarded.

==== Week Seven ====
10/12/2011 @ Blackburn & 17/12/2011 @ Tryst

Throw Off	Home	Away	Score
2:30pm, 10/12/11 @ Blackburn	Edinburgh HC	Dundee HC	43-22
1pm, 17/12/11 @ Tryst	Glasgow HC	Tryst HC	26-35
Day off: EK82 HC

- Glasgow HC lost by less than 10 Goals, 1 bonus point awarded.

==== Week Eight ====
28/01/2012 @ Blackburn

Throw Off	Home	Away	Score
1pm	Glasgow HC	Tryst HC	23-32
2.30pm	Edinburgh HC	Dundee HC	35-26
Day off: EK82 HC

Glasgow HC & Dundee HC lost by less than 10 Goals, 1 bonus point awarded.

==== Week Nine ====
04/02/2012 @ Blackburn

Throw Off	Home	Away	Score
12pm	Edinburgh HC	EK82 HC	0-10
1.30pm	Tryst HC	Dundee HC	39-27
Day off: Glasgow HC

==== Week Ten ====
26/02/2012 @ Blackburn

Throw Off	Home	Away	Score
1pm	Glasgow HC	Edinburgh HC	35-34
2.30pm	EK82 HC	Dundee HC	24-29
Day off: Tryst HC

Edinburgh HC & EK82 HC lost by less than 10 Goals, 1 bonus point awarded.

==== Week Eleven ====
03/03/2012 @ Blackburn

Throw Off	Home	Away	Score
12pm	Glasgow HC	Tryst HC	22-38
1.30pm	Edinburgh HC	Dundee HC	39-24
Day off: EK82 HC

==== Week Twelve ====
17/03/2012 @ Blackburn

Throw Off	Home	Away	Score
1pm	Glasgow HC	Edinburgh HC	30 - 25
2.30pm	EK82 HC	Dundee HC	25 - 35
Day off: Tryst HC

==== Week Thirteen ====
31/03/2012 @ Blackburn

Throw Off	Home	Away	Score
12pm	Glasgow HC	Dundee HC	-
1.30pm	Tryst HC	EK82 HC	-
Day off: Edinburgh HC

==== Week Fourteen ====
14/04/2012 @ Blackburn

Throw Off	Home	Away	Score
1pm	Edinburgh HC	EK82 HC	-
2.30pm	Tryst HC	Dundee HC	-
Day off: Glasgow HC

==== Week Fifteen ====
22/04/2012 @ Tryst

Throw Off	Home	Away	Score
12pm	Glasgow HC	EK82 HC	-
1.30pm	Tryst HC	Edinburgh HC	-
Day off: Dundee HC

=== Men's League table 2011/12 ===
Team	P	W	L	D	G F	G A	G D	Pts
Tryst HC	8	8	0	0	260	193	67	24
Glasgow HC	9	6	3	0	273	250	23	20
Edinburgh HC	9	4	5	0	257	221	36	16
EK82 HC	8	2	6	0	184	226	-42	10
Dundee HC	10	2	8	0	259	343	-84	10

=== Men's League statistics ===
The following statistics for the Scottish Handball League are up to and including week 10:

==== Top goalscorers ====
Player	Team	Games	Goals	Goal Average
Danos Sagias	Glasgow HC	8	65	8.1
Daniel Bandarra	Dundee HC	9	57	6.3
Mounir Iddir	Edinburgh HC	7	49	7
Felix Breyer	Dundee HC	9	45	5
Johnnie McAleer	Tryst HC	7	43	6.1
Charles Razimbaud	Glasgow HC	8	39	4.8
Laszo Csoma	EK82 HC	5	38	7.6
James Yule	Tryst HC	7	38	5.4
Vincent Martinez	Edinburgh HC	7	38	5.4
Peter Meadley	Dundee HC	9	36	4

== Scottish Cup ==
Fixtures will be posted when the draw has been made

=== 1st Round ===
05/05/2012 @ tbc

=== Semi-finals ===
19/05/2012 @ Ravenscraig

=== Final ===
26/05/2012 @ Ravenscraig
