= Scottish Handball League =

Scottish Handball Association

The Scottish Handball League is the premier handball competition for teams in Scotland. The league is regulated by the Scottish Handball Association and is based on a standard round robin format with each team playing one another twice with 2 points awarded for a win and 1 point for a draw.

Location of teams in the Senior Men's Scottish Handball League 2023–24

== Scottish teams ==
- Edinburgh
- EK82 Handball Club
- Glasgow Handball Club
- Kelvinside
- Livingston
- Tryst 77

== Scottish National League Champions ==
Year	Team
1973–74	EK HC
1974–75	EK HC
1975–76	EK HC
1976–77	EK HC
1977–78	EK HC/Barrhead Handball Club
1978–79	EK HC
1982–83	EK82 HC
1983–84	EK82 HC
1984–85 to 1999–2000	Scottish teams played in British League
2000–01	Falkirk HC
2001–02	Tryst 77 HC
2002–03	Edinburgh Eagles
2003–04	Tryst 77 HC
2004–05	Tryst 77 HC
2005–06	Tryst 77 HC
2006–07	Tryst 77 HC
2007–08	Tryst 77 HC
2008	Glasgow HC
2009	Tryst 77 HC
2009–10	Gracemount HC
2010–11	Tryst 77 HC
2011–12	Tryst 77 HC
2012–13	Tryst 77 HC
2013–14	Tryst 77 HC
2014–15	Glasgow HC
2015–16	Glasgow HC
2016–17	Livingston HC
2017–18	Glasgow HC
2018–19	Glasgow HC
2019–20	N/A
2020–21	N/A
2021–22	Livingston HC
2022–23	Livingston HC
2023–24	Livingston HC

== Scottish League Season 2009–10 ==
=== League Table 2009–10 ===
Team	P	W	L	D	G F	G A	G D	Pts
Gracemount HC	12	11	0	1	473	307	166	23
Cumbernauld HC	12	9	3	0	327	261	66	18
Glasgow HC	12	8	3	1	406	318	88	17
Tryst 77 HC	12	6	6	0	337	267	70	12
Liberton HC	12	5	7	0	307	335	-28	10
Ayr HC	12	2	10	0	262	386	-124	4
EK82 HC	12	0	12	0	274	511	-237	0

== Scottish League Season 2010–11 ==
=== Men's League table 2010–11 ===
Team	P	W	L	D	G F	G A	G D	Pts
Tryst 77 HC	10	9	1	0	408	216	192	28
Glasgow HC	10	7	2	1	344	229	115	25
Gracemount HC	10	7	2	1	375	248	127	24
Liberton HC	10	4	6	0	239	272	-33	15
EK82 HC	10	2	8	0	237	340	-103	8
Dumfries HC	10	0	10	0	114	412	-298	0

=== Ladies' League Table 2010–11 ===
Team	P	W	L	D	G F	G A	G D	Pts
Glasgow Ladies HC	2	2	0	0	71	33	38	6
Edinburgh Ladies HC	2	2	0	0	82	54	28	6
EK82 Ladies HC	2	0	2	0	44	73	-29	1
Tryst 77 Ladies HC	2	0	2	0	39	80	-41	0

== Scottish League Season 2014–15 ==
=== Men's League table 2014–15 ===
Team	P	W	L	D	G D	Pts
Glasgow HC	10	9	0	1	83	29
Tryst 77	10	7	2	1	56	25
Edinburgh HC	9	6	3	0	48	21
Livingston	8	-	-	-	-9	12
EK82 HC	9	-	-	-	-90	9
Dundee HC	10	-	-	-	-88	5

== See also ==
- 2009–10 Scottish handball season
- 2010–11 Scottish handball season
- 2011–12 Scottish handball season
