= Scottish Handball Association Cup =

The Scottish Handball Association Cup (known as the Scottish Cup) is a knock out cup competition run by the Scottish Handball Association.

== Scottish National Cup Finals ==
=== Men's results ===
Year	Home	Away	Score
1973/74	**EK HC**		
1975/76	**EK HC**		
1976/77	**EK HC**		
1977/78	**EK HC**		
1978/79	**EK HC**		
1979/80	EK HC	**Allander HC**	14–24
2000/01	**Tryst 77 HC**	Edinburgh Eagles	27–24
2001/02	**Tryst 77 HC**	Edinburgh Eagles	25–15
2002/03	**Edinburgh Eagles**	Glasgow	24–22
2003/04	**Tryst 77 HC**	Falkirk HC	25–24 (AET)
2004/05	**Glasgow**	Tryst 77	35–24
2005/06	**Tryst 77**	Falkirk	34–24
2006/07	**Tryst 77**	Glasgow	30–26
2007/08	**Tryst 77**	Glasgow	27–23
2008/09	**Cumbernauld**	Glasgow	18–18 ft 21–19 aet
2009/10	Tryst 77	**Gracemount**	28–28 aet 2–4 pens
2010/11	**Tryst 77**	Gracemount	33–29

- **Winners in Bold**

== Scottish Cup Season 2009/10 ==
=== Men's Competition ===
==== Quarter-final ====
Blackburn Community Centre, West Lothian 24 April 2010

Game	Throw-Off	Home	Away	Score
1	12.30pm	**Glasgow HC**	EK82 HC	**59-21**
2	2pm	**Tryst 77 HC**	Liberton HC	**53-14**
3	3.30pm	**Gracemount HC**	Glasgow University	**37-15**
4		**Cumbernauld HC**	Bye	-

==== Semi-final ====
Blackburn Community Centre, West Lothian 8 May 2010

Game	Throw-Off	Home	Away	Score
1	1pm	Glasgow HC	**Tryst 77 HC**	**23-37**
2		**Gracemount HC**	Cumbernauld HC	**10-0**

==== Final ====
Paisley Lagoon Leisure Centre, Paisley 22 May 2010

Throw-Off	Home	Away	Score
4.30pm	Tryst 77 HC	**Gracemount HC**	**28-28 aet, 2–4 pens**

=== Women's Competition ===
==== Final ====
Paisley Lagoon Leisure Centre, Paisley 22 May 2010

Throw-Off	Home	Away	Score
1.30pm	Tryst 77 HC	**Glasgow HC**	**16-35**

=== Mini's Competition ===
Paisley Lagoon Leisure Centre, Paisley 22 May 2010

==== Final ====
Home	Away	Score
**EK82 HC**	Livingston HC	-

=== Junior Boys Competition ===
==== Final ====
Paisley Lagoon Leisure Centre, Paisley 22 May 2010

Throw-Off	Home	Away	Score
3pm	Livingston HC	**EK82 HC**	**13-14**

=== Junior Girls Competition ===
Paisley Lagoon Leisure Centre, Paisley 22 May 2010

==== Final ====
Throw-Off	Home	Away	Score
12noon	Livingston HC	**EK82 HC**	**14-22**
