= Jiří Liška =

Jiří Liška may refer to:

- Jiří Liška (handballer) (born 1952), Czech handball player
- Jiří Liška (politician) (1949–2025), Czech politician and veterinarian
- Jiří Liška (footballer) (born 1982), Czech football defender
