= 1983–84 European Cup (handball) =

European men's club handball tournament

European Cup
- 1983–84

Tournament information
- Sport: Handball

Final positions
- Champions: Dukla Prague

The 1983–84 European Cup was the 24th edition of Europe's premier club handball tournament.

== Knockout stage ==
=== Round 1 ===
Team 1	Agg.	Team 2	1st leg	2nd leg
THW Kiel (Germany)	87–14	(United Kingdom) East Kilbride HC	43–8	44–6
Aarhus KFUM (Denmark)	54–57	(Finland) BK46 Karis	29–31	25–26
Benfica Lisboa (Portugal)	45–54	(Austria) ATSE Graz	20–29	25–25
Bankası İstanbul (Turkey)	W.O.	(Bulgaria) CSKA Sofia		
Kolbotn IL Oslo (Norway)	39–39	(Iceland) Víkingur Reykjavík	20–18	19–21
US d'Ivry Paris (France)	35–40	(Belgium) Sporting Neerpelt	19–23	16–17
Ionikos Athens (Greece)	38–43	(Israel) Hapoel Rehovot	21–22	17–21
Cividin Trieste (Italy)	40–48	(Switzerland) TV Zofingen	20–22	20–26
Fola Esch (Luxembourg)	21–44	(Netherlands) Vlug en Lenig Geleen	9–24	12–20

=== Round 2 ===
Team 1	Agg.	Team 2	1st leg	2nd leg
IK Heim (Sweden)	W.O.	(Socialist Federal Republic of Yugoslavia) RK Metaloplastika		
BK46 Karis (Finland)	48–60	(Germany) THW Kiel	24–31	24–29
ATSE Graz (Austria)	43–57	(Hungary) Honvéd Budapest	23–27	20–30
CSKA Sofia (Bulgaria)	44–53	(Poland) Anilana Łódź	19–24	25–29
Sporting Neerpelt (Belgium)	31–37	(Norway) Kolbotn IL Oslo	20–15	11–22
Atlético Madrid (Spain)	29–35	(Germany) VfL Gummersbach	11–16	18–19
Hapoel Rehovot (Israel)	43–45	(Switzerland) TV Zofingen	24–25	19–20
Vlug en Lenig Geleen (Netherlands)	38–56	(Czechoslovakia) Dukla Prague	20–23	18–33

=== Quarterfinals ===
Team 1	Agg.	Team 2	1st leg	2nd leg
THW Kiel (Germany)	43–48	(Socialist Federal Republic of Yugoslavia) RK Metaloplastika	20–22	23–26
Anilana Łódź (Poland)	49–50	(Hungary) Honvéd Budapest	28–22	21–28
VfL Gummersbach (Germany)	43–32	(Norway) Kolbotn IL Oslo	24–14	19–18
TV Zofingen (Switzerland)	38–43	(Czechoslovakia) Dukla Prague	23–25	15–18

=== Semifinals ===
Team 1	Agg.	Team 2	1st leg	2nd leg
RK Metaloplastika (Socialist Federal Republic of Yugoslavia)	54–41	(Hungary) Honvéd Budapest	30–21	24–20
VfL Gummersbach (Germany)	31–32	(Czechoslovakia) Dukla Prague	14–14	17–18

=== Finals ===
Team 1	Agg.	Team 2	1st leg	2nd leg
Dukla Prague (Czechoslovakia)	38–38 (4–2)	(Socialist Federal Republic of Yugoslavia) RK Metaloplastika	21–17	17–21
