= Stika =

Stika or Štika (Czech feminine: Štiková) is a surname. Notable people with the surname include:

- František Štika (born 1960), Czech handball player
- Joseph Stika (1889–1976), United States Coast Guard vice admiral
- Richard Stika (1957–2026), American Roman Catholic bishop
