= Michal Barda =

Czech handball player

Personal information
- Born: 27 June 1955 (age 71) Prague, Czechoslovakia
- Height: 191 cm (75 in)

Sport
- Sport: Handball
- Position: Goalkeeper

Senior clubs
- Years: Team
- 1965-1979: (Czechoslovakia) Slavia Prague
- 1979-?: (Czechoslovakia) HC Dukla Prague
- -1988: (Germany) TV Grosswallstadt
- –: (Germany) TuRU Düsseldorf
- –: (Germany) SG Stuttgart-Scharnhausen
- –: (Germany) SC Leipzig
National team
Years	Team	Apps	(Gls)
1976-1992	Czechoslovakia	218	(4)

Teams managed
- 1992-?: HC Dukla Praha
- 1992: Czechoslovakia
- 1992-?: Czech Republic
- 2016-: Switzerland (GK coach)
Medal record
Men's Handball
Representing Czech Republic
Olympic Games
{{1988 Seoul|Team competition}}

Michal Barda (born 27 June 1955) is a Czech former handball goalkeeper and coach who competed in the 1988 Summer Olympics.

== Playing career ==
Born in Prague, he practiced a lot of sports as table tennis, football and skiing when he started with team handball at Slavia Praha in 1965. From the beginning he played in goal and was moved up to their senior squad at the age of fifteen. 1976, at the age of twenty-one, he made his first cap for Czechoslovakia; in total he played 218 caps and as a goalkeeper scored 4 goals between 1976 and 1992. In 1979 and after 14 years with Slavia Praha, he moved to HC Dukla Praha which he helped to raise to one of the most prominent European clubs at that time, including the 1984 Champions League win over Metaloplastika Sabac. This was for decades the only Champions League finals in handball history decided after penalty shooting. He was considered one of the best handball goalkeepers in the world and main force in the Czechoslovak national team where he acted as captain for more than a decade. After Soviet 1984 Summer Olympics boycott he played his first 1988 Summer Olympics in Seoul. In that time he already played in Handball-Bundesliga in Germany. He was Cup Winners' Cup runner-up with TV Grosswallstadt in 1988 and the next season IHF Cup winner with TuRU Düsseldorf in 1989. In 1985 he played in the IHF World Selection Team against Denmark.

== Coaching career ==
In 1992 Barda retired as player in Germany, returned to Czechoslovakia and became coach of HC Dukla Praha and Czechoslovak (later Czech) national handball team. With his national team he finished seventh at 1993 World Men's Handball Championship in Sweden, eighth at 1995 World Men's Handball Championship in Island and sixth at 1996 European Men's Handball Championship in Spain. He attained the highest Czech and German as well as EHF Master Coach handball coaching licenses. For a long time he acted as lecturer for IHF and EHF, was Head of Commission of Coaching and Methods of the Czech Handball Federation and member of IHF Commission of Coaching and Methods. On behalf of International Olympic Committee he held Olympic Solidarity courses on all continents. He is one of the most recognized goalkeeping experts in handball. Since 2016 he acts as Goalkeeper coach with Swiss National Team Men which after 14 years of absence qualified for European Championship 2020 in Sweden. Beside Sports coaching he earned university degrees in Electronic Engineering and Business Administration and continued his civilian career on top international management positions in IT and Human Resources sector. He works currently as freelancing coach, consultant and project manager in sports and business. Michal Barda is a member of Czech Olympic Coaching Academy.

== Player clubs ==
- Czechoslovakia SK Slavia Praha
- Czechoslovakia HC Dukla Praha
- Germany TV Grosswallstadt
- Germany TuRU Düsseldorf
- Germany SG Stuttgart-Scharnhausen
- Germany SC Leipzig

== Education ==
- Czechoslovakia Electronic engineering at Czech Technical University in Prague
- Germany DHB Coaching License
- Czechoslovakia CHF Handball Coaching License at Charles University in Prague
- Austria EHF Master Coach
- Czech Master of Business Administration at Prague International Business School
