= Jan Novak =

Jan Novak may refer to:

== Arts and entertainment ==
- Jan Novák (composer) (1921–1984), Czech composer of classical music
- Jan Novák (writer) (born 1953), Czech writer and playwright

== Sports ==
- Ján Novák (footballer) (born 1985), Slovak association football striker
- Jan Novák (footballer, born 1896) (1896–1968), Czech footballer
- Jan Novak (footballer, born 1997), Slovenian footballer
- Jan Novák (handballer) (born 1960), Czech handball player
- Jan Novák (ice hockey) (born 1979), Czech professional ice hockey player

== Other uses ==
- Jan Novak, a placeholder name in the Czech language, similar to John Doe in English
