= RK Zamet in European handball =

- Club: RK Zamet
- First entry: 1992–93 European Champions Cup
- Latest entry: 2016–17 EHF Cup

RK Zamet is a Croatian handball club. This article details their record in European handball competitions.

== History ==
RK Zamet have participated in four EHF competitions. Their first appearance in Europe was in 1992 when they played Laško Pivovara Celje in the first round of European Cup. Zamet has appeared one in the EHF Champions League (then European Cup) and EHF Challenge Cup (then called City Cup), three time in the EHF Cup Winners' Cup and five time in the EHF Cup.

The club's greatest achievement was reaching the fourth round in 2002-03 EHF Cup where they lost to Dinamo Viktor Stavropol. During the second match a in Rijeka second before the end of the first half a brawl started near the scoretable with Zlatko Saračević and Vitalij Andronov. Both teams started fighting and some fans joined in and beath the Russian players. The EHF fined Zamet with a loss of 0:10, a fine of €7,500 and Zamet were punished with not being able to play a European match on their field for a year.

=== By competition ===
Competition	Pld	W	D	L	GF	GA	Last season played
European Champions Cup; EHF Champions League	2	1	0	1	35	36	1992–1993
EHF Cup	14	7	0	7	319	356	2016–17
EHF Cup Winners' Cup	10	3	0	7	231	246	2001-02
EHF City Cup; EHF Challenge Cup	4	3	0	1	94	85	1998-99
Total	30	14	0	16	679	723	

Source: eurohandball.com Last updated on 26 November 2016.
Pld = Matches played; W = Matches won; D = Matches drawn; L = Matches lost; GF = Goals for; GA = Goals against. Defunct competitions indicated in italics.

=== Summary by ground ===
Ground	Pld	W	D	L	GF	GA	GD
Home	15	7	0	8	349	347	+2
Away	15	6	0	9	330	371	−41
Total	30	13	0	17	679	718	−39

Source: eurohandball.com Last updated on 26 November 2016.
Pld = Matches played; W = Matches won; D = Matches drawn; L = Matches lost; GF = Goals for; GA = Goals against. Defunct competitions indicated in italics.

== Matches by season ==
Season	Competition	Round	Date of game	Club	First game	Combined score	Second game	Club	Date of game
1992-1993	European Champions Cup	R1	9 September 1992	(Slovenia) Pivovarna Laško Celje	25-17	36-35	11 - 18	(Croatia) Zamet	23 September 1992
1998-1999	EHF City Cup	1/16	3 October 1998	(Luxembourg) HC Berchem	18-23	36- 50	18 - 27	(Croatia) Zamet Autotrans	10 October 1998
1998-1999	EHF City Cup	1/8	7 November 1998	(France) US Dunkerque HBGL	23-20	49-44	21 - 23	(Croatia) Zamet Autotrans	14 November 1998
1999-2000	EHF Cup Winners' Cup	1/16	3 October 1999	(Switzerland) Pfadi Winterthur	29-23	59-49	30-26	(Croatia) Zamet Autotrans	9 October 1999
2000-2001	EHF Cup Winners' Cup	R3	11 November 2000	(Belgium) HCE Tongeren	15-16	31-41	16-25	(Croatia) Zamet Crotek	12 November 2000
2000-2001	EHF Cup Winners' Cup	R4	10 December 2000	(Croatia) Zamet Crotek	20-21	41-53	21-32	(Portugal) FC Porto Vitalis	17 December 2000
2001-2002	EHF Cup Winners' Cup	R3	9 November 2001	(Croatia) Zamet Crotek	31-34	63-55	32-21	(Lithuania) Siauliai Universitetas	11 November 2001
2001-2002	EHF Cup Winners' Cup	R4	8 December 2001	(Croatia) Zamet Crotek	23-24	37-48	14-24	(France) Montpellier HB	16 December 2001
2002-2003	EHF Cup	R2	12 October 2002	(Belarus) SKA Minsk	20-28	44-49	24-21	(Croatia) Zamet Crotek	13 October 2002
2002-2003	EHF Cup	R3	12 October 2002	(Croatia) Zamet Crotek	27-24	47-42	20-18	(Netherlands) Wealer Geleen HB	16 November 2002
2002-2003	EHF Cup	R4	8 December 2002	(Russia) Dinamo Viktor Stavropol	29-18	39-18	10-0	(Croatia) Zamet Crotek	14 December 2002
2012-2013	EHF Cup	QR 1	8 September 2012	(Czech Republic) HK ASA Meso Lovoseice	27-23	59-56	32-33	(Croatia) Zamet	15 September 2012
2016-2017	EHF Cup	QR 1	2 September 2016	(France) Créteil	29-32	56-56	27-24	(Croatia) Zamet	10 September 2016
2016-2017	EHF Cup	QR 2	8 October 2016	(Romania) CSM București	29-23	50-50	27-21	(Croatia) Zamet	15 October 2016
2016-2017	EHF Cup	QR 3	19 November 2016	(Croatia) Zamet	23-34	43:66	32:20	(Germany) MT Melsungen	26 November 2016

Source: , Last updated on 29 September 2016.

=== Record wins and defeats ===
- Home win: 16:25 v. HCE Tongeren, 2000-01, 12 November 2000
- Away win: 32:21 v. Siauliai Universitetas, 2001-02, 11 November 2001
- Home defeat: 23:34 v. MT Melsungen, 2016-17, 19 November 2016
- Away defeat: 32:20 v. MT Melsungen, 2016-17, 26 November 2016

=== Record by country of opposition ===
Updated on 26 November 2016.

Country	Pld	W	D	L	F	A	GD	Win%
Belarus	2	2	0	0	49	44	+5	100.00
Belgium	2	2	0	0	41	31	+10	100.00
Czech Republic	2	1	0	1	56	59	−3	50.00
France	6	2	0	4	136	145	−9	33.33
Germany	2	0	0	2	43	66	−23	0.00
Lithuania	2	1	0	1	63	55	+8	50.00
Luxembourg	2	2	0	0	50	36	+14	100.00
Netherlands	2	2	0	0	47	42	+5	100.00
Portugal	2	0	0	2	41	53	−12	0.00
Romania	2	1	0	1	50	50	+0	50.00
Russia	2	0	0	2	18	39	−21	0.00
Slovenia	2	1	0	1	36	35	+1	50.00
Switzerland	2	0	0	2	49	59	−10	0.00

=== Player records ===
- Most appearances in EHF club competitions:
  - 27 appearances: Milan Uzelac
- Most goals in EHF club competitions:
  - Mateo Hrvatin

=== Coaching records ===
- Most appearances in EHF club competitions:
  - 14 appearances: Damir Čavlović
