= 2009–10 Scottish handball season =

All competitive handball in Scotland is sanctioned and organised by the Scottish Handball Association.

The Scottish Handball Men's League Season ran from 3 October 2009 until 22 May 2010.

Gracemount Handball Club were crowned the Men's League Champions on 10 April 2010 after clinching a 32-32 draw against Glasgow Handball Club.

All league games and cup qualification matches were played at Blackburn Community Centre, Blackburn, West Lothian.

The Scottish Cup Finals were played at the Paisley Lagoon Leisure Centre.

== Scottish Men's League ==
=== Fixtures/results ===
==== Week 1–3 October 2009 ====
Throw Off	Home	Away	Score
11.30am	Liberton HC	Gracemount HC	12-37
1pm	Glasgow HC	Ayr HC	36-26
2.30pm	Cumbernauld HC	EK82 HC	50-19

- Free Week - Tryst 77 HC

==== Week 2–17 October 2009 ====
Throw Off	Home	Away	Score
11.30am	Liberton HC	Glasgow HC	21-30
1pm	EK82 HC	Tryst 77 HC	27-43
2.30pm	Gracemount HC	Ayr HC	47-16

- Free Week - Cumbernauld HC

==== Week 3–7 November 2009 ====
Throw Off	Home	Away	Score
1pm	EK82 HC	Gracemount HC	24-37
2.30pm	Cumbernauld HC	Ayr HC	35-32
4pm	Liberton HC	Tryst 77 HC	32-29

- Free Week - Glasgow HC

==== Week 4–21 November 2009 ====
Throw Off	Home	Away	Score
11.30am	Cumbernauld HC	Liberton HC	37-27
1pm	Glasgow HC	Tryst 77 HC	34-31
2.30pm	Ayr HC	EK82 HC	41-26

- Free Week - Gracemount HC

==== Week 5–5 December 2009 ====
Throw Off	Home	Away	Score
11.30am	Liberton HC	EK82 HC	40-20
1pm	Tryst 77 HC	Gracemount HC	28-32
2.30pm	Glasgow HC	Cumbernauld HC	25-30

- Free Week - Ayr HC

==== Week 6–12 December 2009 ====
Throw Off	Home	Away	Score
Forfeit	Tryst 77 HC	Cumbernauld HC	0-10
1pm	Gracemount HC	Glasgow HC	35-28
Forfeit	Ayr HC	Liberton HC	0-10

- Free Week - EK82 HC

==== Week 7–9 January 2010 ====
Throw Off	Home	Away	Score
11.30am	Glasgow HC	EK82 HC	40-29
1pm	Gracemount HC	Cumbernauld HC	38-30
Forfeit	Tryst 77 HC	Ayr HC	10-0

- Free Week - Liberton HC

==== Week 8–23 January 2010 ====
Throw Off	Home	Away	Score
11.30am	Gracemount HC	Liberton HC	35-18
1pm	Ayr HC	Glasgow HC	19-36
2.30pm	EK82 HC	Cumbernauld HC	21-28

- Free Week - Tryst 77 HC

==== Week 9–6 February 2010 ====
Throw Off	Home	Away	Score
11.30am	Glasgow HC	Liberton HC	35-29
1pm	Tryst 77 HC	EK82 HC	53-10
2.30pm	Ayr HC	Gracemount HC	29-57

- Free Week - Cumbernauld HC

==== Week 10–27 February 2010 ====
Throw Off	Home	Away	Score
11.30am	Gracemount HC	EK82 HC	45-22
1pm	Tryst 77 HC	Liberton HC	35-31
Forfeit	Ayr HC	Cumbernauld HC	0-10

- Free Week - Glasgow HC

==== Week 11–6 March 2010 ====
Throw Off	Home	Away	Score
11.30am	Ayr HC	Tryst 77 HC	23-51
1pm	Liberton HC	Cumbernauld HC	26-30
2.30pm	EK82 HC	Glasgow HC	20-55

- Free Week - Gracemount HC

==== Week 12–27 March 2010 ====
Throw Off	Home	Away	Score
10.30am	EK82 HC	Liberton HC	23-27
12pm	Gracemount HC	Tryst 77 HC	37-30
1.30pm	Cumbernauld HC	Glasgow HC	19-32

- Free Week - Ayr HC

==== Week 13–10 April 2010 ====
Throw Off	Home	Away	Score
11.30am	Cumbernauld HC	Tryst 77 HC	10-0
1pm	Glasgow HC	Gracemount HC	32-32
2.30pm	Liberton HC	Ayr HC	34-24

- Free Week - EK82 HC

==== Week 14–17 April 2010 ====
Throw Off	Home	Away	Score
11.30am	EK82 HC	Ayr HC	34-52
1pm	Cumbernauld HC	Gracemount HC	38-41
2.30pm	Tryst 77 HC	Glasgow HC	27-21

Free Week - Liberton HC

== League table 2009/10 ==
Team	P	W	L	D	G F	G A	G D	Pts
Gracemount HC	12	11	0	1	473	307	166	23
Cumbernauld HC	12	9	3	0	327	261	66	18
Glasgow HC	12	8	3	1	406	318	88	17
Tryst 77 HC	12	6	6	0	337	267	70	12
Liberton HC	12	5	7	0	307	335	-28	10
Ayr HC	12	2	10	0	262	386	-124	4
EK82 HC	12	0	12	0	274	511	-237	0

== League statistics ==
The following statistics for the Scottish Handball League are up to and including week 14:

=== Top goalscorers ===
Player	Team	Games	Goals	Average Goals
Allan Stokes	Gracemount HC	12	111	9.2
Danos Sagias	Glasgow HC	10	103	10.3
Kris Suzlic	Ayr HC	9	98	10.8
Gary McCafferty	Tryst 77 HC	6	74	12.3
Robert Schotten	Gracemount HC	10	73	7.3
Mounir Iddir	Gracemount HC	11	67	6
Michael Lavery	EK82 HC	11	59	5.3
Christian Wolf	Gracemount HC	10	50	5
Christoph Boettger	Glasgow HC	10	50	5
Andy Wallace	EK82 HC	11	49	4.4
Vincent Martinez	Liberton HC	11	46	4.1

=== Club disciplinary records ===
Team	Games	Cautions	2 Mins	Red Cards
Ayr HC	11	14	9	0
Cumbernauld HC	11	9	14	0
EK82 HC	11	29	37	3
Glasgow HC	11	16	21	0
Gracemount HC	11	20	31	0
Liberton HC	12	16	29	1
Tryst 77 HC	11	8	8	2

== Scottish Cup season 2009/10 ==
=== Quarter final ===
Blackburn Community Centre, West Lothian 24 April 2010

Game	Throw-Off	Home	Away	Score
1	12.30pm	Glasgow HC	EK82 HC	59-21
2	2pm	Tryst 77 HC	Liberton HC	53-14
3	3.30pm	Gracemount HC	Glasgow University	37-15
4		Cumbernauld HC	Bye	-

=== Semi final ===
Blackburn Community Centre, West Lothian 8 May 2010

Game	Throw-Off	Home	Away	Score
1	1pm	Glasgow HC	Tryst 77 HC	-
2		Gracemount HC	Cumbernauld HC	10-0

=== Final ===
Paisley Lagoon Leisure Centre, Paisley 22 May 2010

Throw-Off	Home	Away	Score
TBA	Winner SF1	Gracemount HC	-

=== Top goalscorers ===
Player	Team	Games	Goals
