= Dundee Handball Club =

Scottish handball club

Dundee HC
- Full name: Dundee Handball Club
- Short name: Dundee / DHC
- Founded: 31 August 2011
- Head coach: Jamie Lau & Stelios Nikolaou
- League: Scottish Handball League
- 2011/12: 5th
- Club colours
Home	Away

Dundee Handball Club, is a handball club from Dundee, Scotland. They play in the Scottish National League, their first season being 2011/2012.

== History ==
Dundee Handball Club was formed in 2011 as a result of the need for the sport in Dundee by foreign players. In its first year, the handball club only hosted a men's team and was based at the ISE, University of Dundee Campus, Dundee, Tayside, Scotland.

Dundee Handball Club is affiliated to the Scottish Handball Association and currently competes in the Scottish Handball League. With the entrance of Dundee Handball Club into the Scottish Handball League the competition, between the teams within the league, has grown stronger. Dundee Handball Club had a good first year as they finished 5th in the Scottish Handball League. The men's team also reached the Final stage of the Scottish National Handball Cup, beating both RGU Aberdeen HC in the Quarter-final stage and Ravenscraig HC in the Semi-final stage. They lost to Edinburgh HC in the Final, but DHC showed they are a competitive club and a strong rival for all teams in the Scottish Handball League.

In their second year, Dundee Handball Club established the first Women's Handball team in Dundee, with players from all over Europe. The ladies went on to compete in the Scottish Handball League, finishing last but gaining a tremendous amount of experience. They went on to compete in the Scottish National Handball Cup and reaching the Semi-final stage, where they withdrew due to the lack of players available to compete. The men's team, with 1 years experience managed to finish in 4th place in the Scottish Handball League, above newcomers RGU Aberdeen HC and just below veterans Glasgow HC. In the cup fixtures, the men beat RGU Aberdeen HC in the quarter-final stage and managed to give Tryst HC a run for their money in the Semi-final stage, but lost to, Champions and Cup winners 2012/2013, Tryst HC.

The club purports to welcome students and non-students of all ages, abilities, genders and nationalities and draws players from the student body at both University of Dundee and Abertay University. DHC is run by a committee of two handball dedicated individuals (Jamie Lau & Stelios Nikolaou), but also works in partnership with SportDundee (Dundee City Council). and ActiveSchools Dundee

== Previous Seasons ==
=== 2011 / 2012 ===
==== Squad ====
		Men
NR	Nationality	Name
1	Scotland	Nikolaos Georgopoulos (GK)
2	Cyprus	Stelios Nikolaou
3	Spain	Rafa Ayerbe
5	Germany	Felix Breyer
6	Algeria	Mohamed Saadune
8	Malta	Peter Meadley
9	Portugal	Daniel Bandarra
10	Spain	Hugo Piñón
11	Hong Kong	Jamie Lau
14	Poland	Marek Chorobinski
15	France	Thomas Hercelin
17	Germany	Daniel Bode
20	Spain	Saul Verde

=== League Fixtures/Results ===
Date	Home	Away	Score
2011/10/08	Tryst HC	Dundee HC	34 - 24
2011/10/15	Glasgow HC	Dundee HC	44 - 20
2011/11/13	EK82 HC	Dundee HC	33 - 27
2011/11/26	Glasgow HC	Dundee HC	27 - 25
2011/12/10	Edinburgh HC	Dundee HC	43 - 22
2012/01/28	Edinburgh HC	Dundee HC	35 - 26
2012/02/04	Tryst HC	Dundee HC	39 - 27
2012/02/26	EK82 HC	Dundee HC	24 - 29
2012/03/03	Edinburgh HC	Dundee HC	39 - 24
2012/03/17	EK82 HC	Dundee HC	25 - 35
2012/03/31	Glasgow HC	Dundee HC	
2012/04/14	Tryst HC	Dundee HC	

=== Top goalscorers ===
Player	Team	Games	Goals	Goal Average
Danos Sagias	Glasgow HC	8	65	8.1
Daniel Bandarra	Dundee HC	9	57	6.3
Mounir Iddir	Edinburgh HC	7	49	7
Felix Breyer	Dundee HC	9	45	5
Johnnie McAleer	Tryst HC	7	43	6.1
Charles Razimbaud	Glasgow HC	8	39	4.8
Laszo Csoma	EK82 HC	5	38	7.6
James Yule	Tryst HC	7	38	5.4
Vincent Martinez	Edinburgh HC	7	38	5.4
Peter Meadley	Dundee HC	9	36	4

=== Men's League table 2011/12 ===
Team	P	W	L	D	G F	G A	G D	Pts
Tryst HC	8	8	0	0	260	193	67	24
Glasgow HC	9	6	3	0	273	250	23	20
Edinburgh HC	9	4	5	0	257	221	36	16
EK82 HC	7	2	5	0	159	191	-32	9
Dundee HC	9	1	8	0	224	318	-94	7

For this season a new points system has been adopted for both the men's and women's leagues:

- 3 Points for a Win
- 2 Points for a Draw
- 1 Point for a Defeat by 10 goals or less
- 0 Points for a Defeat greater than 11 goals

The reason for this is to make both league's more competitive.

== Current Season 2012/2013 ==
=== Teams ===
		Men				Women
NR	Nationality	Name	--------------------	NR	Nationality	Name
1	Scotland	Nikolaos Georgopoulos (GK)		1	Germany	Elena Eusterwiemann (GK)
2	Germany	Jens Hukelmann				
3	Cyprus	Costas Karayiannis				
4	Poland	Marek Chorobinski		4	Poland	Eliza Przybylińska
5	Germany	Felix Breyer		5	Portugal	Sara Carvalhal
6	Germany	Daniel Bode				
7	England	Alex Foster		7	Sweden	Clara Sebelius
8	Malta	Peter Meadley		8	Sweden	Johanna Thonning
9	Portugal	Daniel Bandarra		9	Germany	Larissa Kennel
10	Hong Kong	Jamie Lau		10	France	Solene Gouill
11	Algeria	Mohamed Saadune		11	France	Marianne Tardy
12	Germany	Kai Beckmann (GK)		12	Denmark	Caroline Damgaard (GK)
13	Cyprus	Stelios Nikolaou		13	Germany	Rebecca Stautenberg
14	Spain	Alejandro Ferreiros Fuentes		14	Norway	Ingvil Ofstad
	Egypt	Khaled Mabrouk			Germany	Miriam Schreiber
	Germany	Johannes Neubehler			Germany	Sabrina Wagner
	Poland	Dawid Garlinski			France	Mary Kerdoncuff
