= Vidar Bauer =

Norwegian handball player and coach (born 1954)

Vidar Bauer (born 19 September 1954 in Grue, Norway) is a handball player and coach.

== Biography ==
For most of his active career, he played for Kolbotn Håndball. He was the third of five siblings, and his less successful brothers Runar Bauer and Hans Edvard Bauer also played for Kolbotn Håndball .

Between 1978 and 1985, he played 153 international games for the Norwegian National team.

Vidar Bauer won the Norwegian National league with Kolbotn in 1983 and 1984.

Bauer was made an honorable member of Kolbotn IL in 1985 and in 1999 the Norwegian Handball Federation (NHF) awarded him “Håndballstatuetten” in recognition of his contribution to Norwegian handball.

After retiring as a player, Bauer has been a coach for a number of teams, both at the senior and junior level.
