= Jan Filip (handballer) =

Czech handball coach

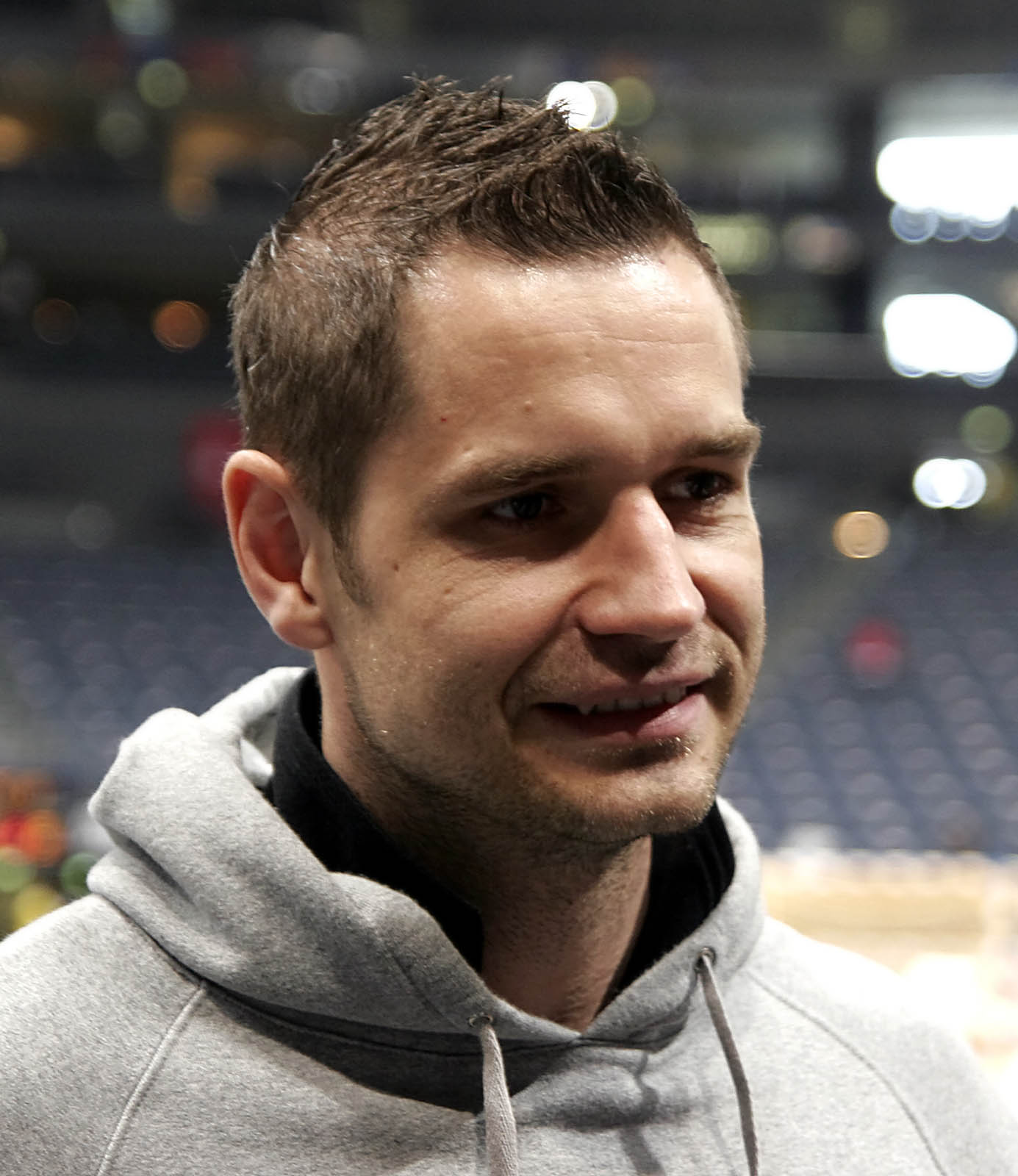
- Jan Filip (12 May 2007)

Personal information
- Nationality: Czech
- Born: 14 June 1973 (age 53) Prague, Czechoslovakia
- Height: 1.88 m (6 ft 2 in)

Sport
- Sport: Handball
- Position: Right wing

Youth career
- Years: Team
- 1985–1992: HC Dukla Prague

Senior clubs
- Years: Team
- 1992–1997: HC Dukla Prague
- 1997–1998: HSG Düsseldorf
- 1998–1999: HC Dukla Prague
- 1999–2000: Pallamano Conversano
- 2000–2008: HSG Nordhorn
- 2008–2009: Rhein-Neckar Löwen
- 2009–2011: Kadetten Schaffhausen
- 2011–2015: TSV St. Otmar St. Gallen
National team
Years	Team	Apps	(Gls)
–	Czech Republic	200	(991)

Teams managed
- 2011–2015: TSV St. Otmar St. Gallen
- 2014–2021: Czech Republic

Jan Filip (born 14 June 1973) is a Czech handball coach and former player. From 2014 to 2021 he was the head coach for the Czech national team together with Daniel Kubeš.

== Coaching career ==
From 2011 to January 2015 he was the player-coach at TSV St. Otmar St. Gallen in Switzerland.

In 2014 Filip became the coach of the Czech national team together with Daniel Kubeš.

In 2021 he had qualified the team for the 2021 World Championship, but because the team had a lot of players hit by COVID-19 the team withdrew from the tournament, before it was started. As a consequence, Kubeš was fired as the head coach. Daniel Kubeš was also fired at the same time.

== Private life ==
Filip goes by the nickname "Honza". He is married with two kids.
