= Runar Bauer =

Norwegian handball player (born 1952)

Runar Bauer (born October 16, 1952) is a Norwegian handball player.

He played for Kolbotn I.L. for several years, including the 1982/1983 season and the 1983/1984 season when Kolbotn won the National league.

At Kolbotn, he was joined by his two younger brothers Vidar Bauer and Hans Edvard Bauer.

Bauer scored 3 goals during his 4 appearances for the Norwegian National Team.

Towards the end of his career Bauer also played for Sarpsborg, at the time further down in the Norwegian league system.
