= Daniel Kubeš =

Czech handball coach (born 1978)

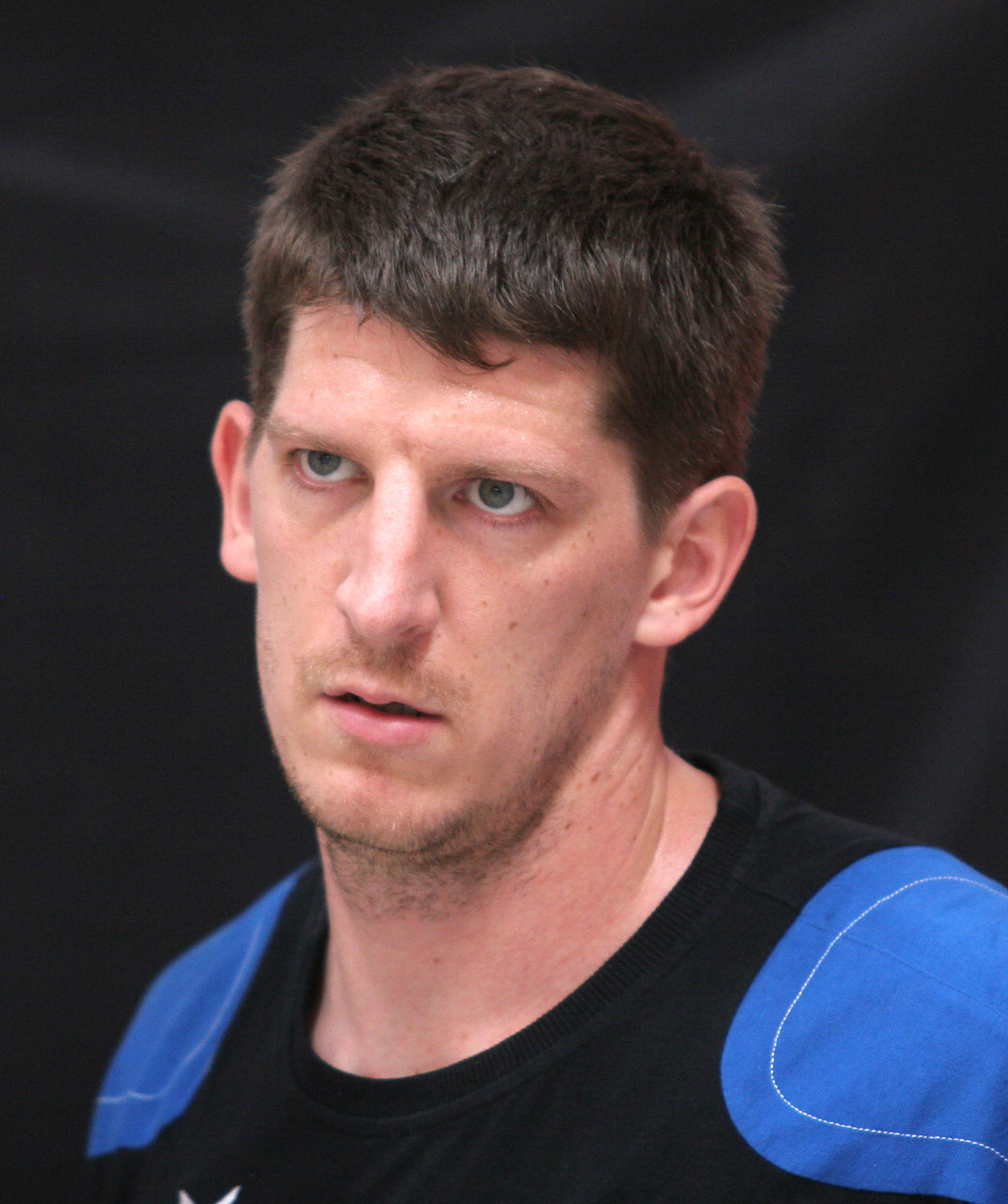
- Daniel Kubeš playing for TBV Lemgo during the Schlecker Cup in Ehingen, Baden-Württembrg, Germany in August 2009

Personal information
- Nationality: Czech
- Born: 7 February 1978 (age 48) Prague, Czechoslovakia
- Height: 2.00 m (6 ft 7 in)

Sport
- Sport: Handball
- Position: Pivot

Senior clubs
- Years: Team
- 1996-2001: HC Dukla Prague
- 2001-2004: HK Drott Halmstad
- 2004-2006: TuS N-Lübbecke
- 2006-2008: HSG Nordhorn
- 2008-2010: TBV Lemgo
- 2010-2012: THW Kiel
- 2012-2014: MT Melsungen
National team
| Years | Team | Apps | (Gls) |
| 2002-2014 | Czech Republic | 140 | (210) |

Teams managed
- 2014-2021: Czechia
- 2014-2020: TV Emsdetten
- 2020-2023: HSG Nordhorn-Lingen
- 2024-: HC Dukla Prague

Daniel Kubeš (born 7 February 1978) is a Czech handball coach and former player. From 2014 to 2021 he was the head coach for the Czech national team together with Jan Filip.

== Playing career ==
Kubeš was primarily a defensive player. At club level he most of his career in the German Bundesliga. Here he played for a long list of clubs. Additionally he played for HC Dukla Prague in his home country, HK Drott Halmstad in Sweden.

== Coaching career ==
In 2014 Kubeš became the coach of the Czech national team together with Jan Filip.

In 2021 he had qualified the team for the 2021 World Championship, but because the team had a lot of players hit by COVID-19 the team withdrew from the tournament, before it was started. As a consequence, Kubeš was fired as the head coach. Jan Filip was also fired at the same time.

In addition to coaching the Czech national team, he was simultaneously coaching at club level. From the start of season 2014–15 to February 2020 he was the coach of 2. Bundesliga team TV Emsdetten.

In 2020 he took over at HSG Nordhorn-Lingen, where he was until 2023. For the 2024–25 season he took over at HC Dukla Prague, where he played himself.
