= Jakub Sviták =

Czech handball player

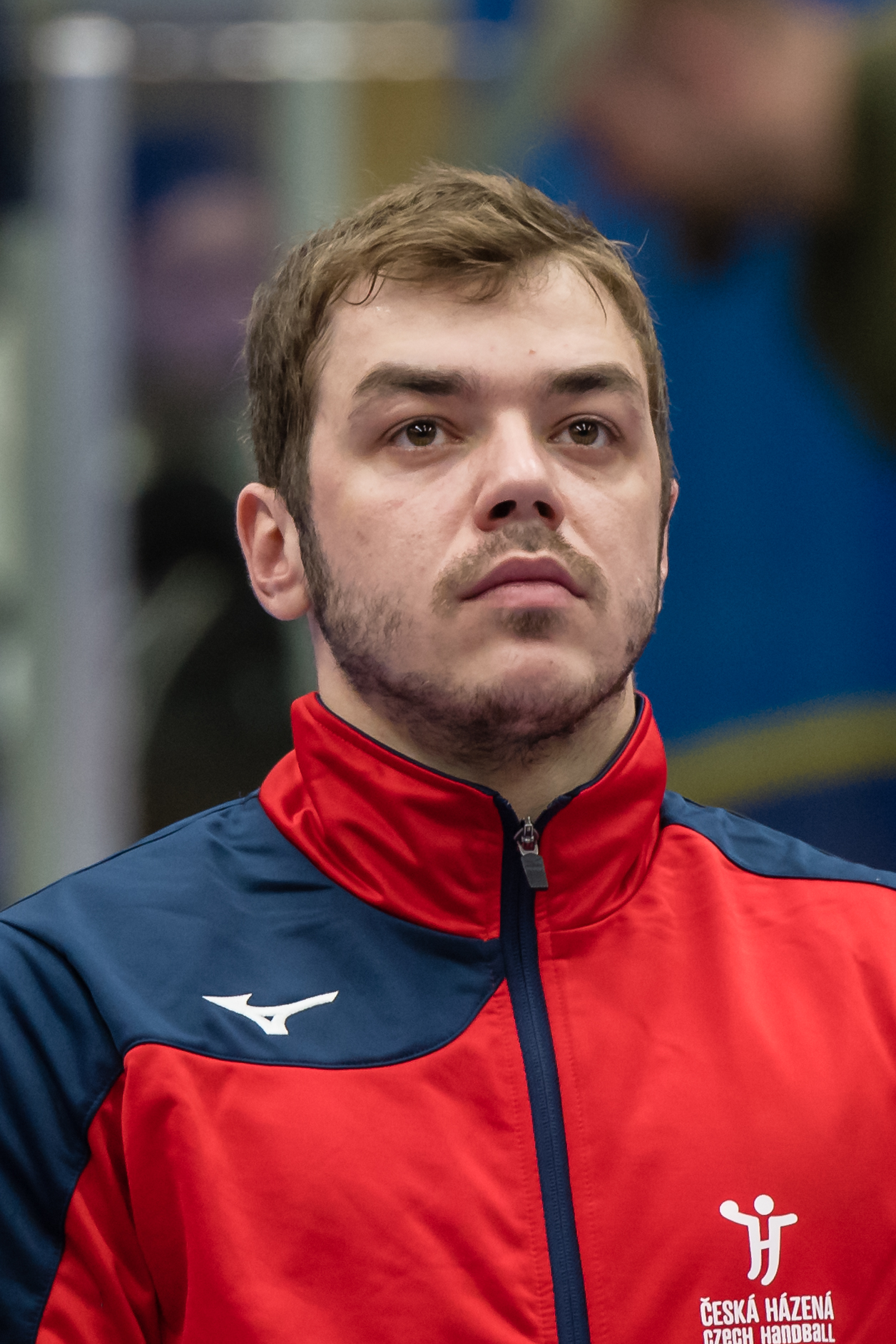

Personal information
- Nationality: Czech
- Born: 10 May 1991 (age 35) Prague, Czechoslovakia
- Height: 1.80 m (5 ft 11 in)

Sport
- Sport: Handball
- Position: Centre back
- Current club: Dukla Prague
- Number: 9
National team
| Years | Team | Apps | (Gls) |
| – | Czech Republic | 2 | (2) |

Jakub Sviták (born 10 May 1991) is a Czech handball player for Dukla Prague and the Czech national team.

He participated at the 2018 European Men's Handball Championship.
