= EHF Champions League =

European handball competition

- Upcoming season or competition: 2026–27 EHF Champions League
- Sport: Handball
- Founded: 1956; 70 years ago
- No. of teams: 24 (Group phase)
- Country: EHF members
- Confederation: EHF (Europe)
- Most recent champions: (Spain) FC Barcelona (13th title)
- Most titles: (Spain) FC Barcelona (13 titles)
- Level on pyramid: 1
- Website: ehfcl.eurohandball.com

The EHF Champions League is the most important club handball competition for men's teams in Europe and involves the leading teams from the top European nations. The competition is organised every year by EHF. The official name for the men's competition is the EHF Champions League Men.

The EHF coefficient rank decides which teams have access and in which stage they enter.

== Eligibility and qualifying ==
Each year, the EHF publishes a ranking list of its member federations. The first 9 nations are automatically permitted to participate in the tournament with their national champion. The national federation ranked first place in the EHF European League, currently Germany, is awarded a second qualification berth for the domestic runner-up. The remaining six positions are designated through wildcards, with each national federation without two teams already qualified able to submit a single applicant. The wildcards are judged on five criteria: venue, TV, spectators, results in past EHF competitions and product management and digital.

== Tournament format ==
=== Current ===
Each year, the EHF publishes a ranking list of its member federations. The first nine nations are allowed to participate in the tournament with their national champion. In addition, the tenth spot is reserved for the best ranked national federation of the EHF European League Men. The national federations are allowed to request upgrades for their teams eligible to play in the EHF European League and based on the criteria list the EHF Executive Committee approves six upgrades.

The EHF Champions League is divided into four stages. All participating teams enter the competition in the group phase.

The current playing system has been introduced before the 2020/21 season.

Since the 2020/21 season, the format sees two groups formed, with eight teams each in Group A and B. All the teams in each group play each other twice, in home and away matches (14 rounds in total). The first two teams in Groups A and B advance directly to the quarter-finals, while teams from positions three to six in each of these groups proceed to the playoff. The season is over for the last two teams in each group after the completion of the group phase. The pairings for the playoff are decided by the placement of the teams at the end of the group phase (A6 vs B3, B6 vs A3, A5 vs B4 and B5 vs A4). Each pairing is decided via a home and away format, with the aggregate winners over the two legs advancing to the quarter-finals. The higher ranked teams in the group phase have the home right advantage in the second leg. The pairings for the quarter-finals are also decided by the placement in the group phase (Winner of A5/B4 vs A1, Winner B5/A4 vs B1, Winner A6/B3 vs A2, Winner B6/A3 vs B2). The ties are decided through a home and away format, with the four winners over the two legs played in each pairing advancing to the EHF FINAL4. The higher ranked teams in the group phase have the home right advantage in the second leg. The official name for the men's EHF FINAL4 is the EHF FINAL4 Men. The participating EHF FINAL4 teams are paired for the semifinals through a draw and play the last two matches of the season over a single weekend at one venue. The two semi-finals are played on a Saturday, with the third-place game and final on a Sunday.

=== New format (2026–) ===
The new format will see 24 teams being split into six groups of four teams. The two top-placed teams advance to the main round, which conists of two groups of six, where the top four-placed teams advance to the quarterfinals.

== Brand Sound ==
Much like the visual brand identity, the brand sound identity will acoustically connect the various leagues and tournaments which fit under the EHF umbrella. For the EHF Brand Sound, the authors got to the core of "The Sound of Handball" and created a handball sound DNA as the recurring element across all audio-visual applications. The jump shot was identified as the most iconic and defining handball movement.

Through video analysis and motion tracking, the jump shot was extracted into a rhythmic design pattern. There are numerous application opportunities of the brand sound, which will be developed over time. First implementations of the new EHF Brand Sound will be heard in the EHF Champions League. The premium character of this tournament was translated into a modern sound design through a new EHF Champions League sound logo and anthem. Both will come to life in the arena and will consistently complement all audio-visual communications.

The previous anthem for the EHF Champions League is "Hymn of the Champions", used until the end of the 2019/20 season and exclusively written by Austrian film composer Roman Kariolou in 2007. The recording played during the entry ceremony before every game was performed by the Bratislava Symphony Orchestra, conducted by David Hernando.

== Winners ==
| # | Year | Final | | | Semi-final losers | |
| # | Year | Champion | Score | Second place | Semi-final losers | |
**European Champions Cup (organised by IHF)**
| 1 | 1956–57; Details | (Czechoslovakia); **Dukla Prague** | 21–13 | (Sweden); Örebro SK | (Denmark); HG Copenhagen | (France); Paris UC |
| 2 | 1958–59; Details | (Sweden); **Redbergslids IK** | 18–13 | (West Germany); Frisch Auf Göppingen | (Denmark); FC Helsingør | (Romania); Dinamo București |
| 3 | 1959–60; Details | (West Germany); **Frisch Auf Göppingen** | 18–13 | (Denmark); Aarhus GF | (Romania); Dinamo București | (France); Paris UC |
| 4 | 1961–62; Details | (West Germany); **Frisch Auf Göppingen** | 13–11 | (Socialist Federal Republic of Yugoslavia); Partizan Bjelovar | (Czechoslovakia); Dukla Prague | (Denmark); IK Skovbakken |
| 5 | 1962–63; Details | (Czechoslovakia); **Dukla Prague** | 15–13 | (Romania); Dinamo București | (West Germany); Frisch Auf Göppingen | (Denmark); Ajax København |
| 6 | 1964–65; Details | (Romania); **Dinamo București** | 13–11 | (Socialist Federal Republic of Yugoslavia); Medveščak Zagreb | (Switzerland); Grasshopper | (Denmark); Ajax København |
| 7 | 1965–66; Details | (East Germany); **SC DHfK Leipzig** | 16–14 | (Hungary); Budapest Honvéd | (Czechoslovakia); Dukla Prague | (Denmark); Aarhus GF |
| 8 | 1966–67; Details | (West Germany); **VfL Gummersbach** | 17–13 | (Czechoslovakia); Dukla Prague | (Soviet Union); SK Cuncevo | (Romania); Dinamo București |
| 9 | 1967–68; Details | (Romania); **Steaua București** | 13–11 | (Czechoslovakia); Dukla Prague | (East Germany); Dynamo Berlin | (Socialist Federal Republic of Yugoslavia); Partizan Bjelovar |
| 10 | 1969–70; Details | (West Germany); **VfL Gummersbach** | 14–11 | (East Germany); Dynamo Berlin | (Romania); Steaua București | (Socialist Federal Republic of Yugoslavia); RK Crvenka |
| 11 | 1970–71; Details | (West Germany); **VfL Gummersbach** | 17–16 | (Romania); Steaua București | (Portugal); Sporting CP | (Socialist Federal Republic of Yugoslavia); Partizan Bjelovar |
| 12 | 1971–72; Details | (Socialist Federal Republic of Yugoslavia); **Partizan Bjelovar** | 19–14 | (West Germany); VfL Gummersbach | (Soviet Union); MAI Moscow | (Czechoslovakia); Tatran Prešov |
| 13 | 1972–73; Details | (Soviet Union); **MAI Moscow** | 26–23 | (Socialist Federal Republic of Yugoslavia); Partizan Bjelovar | (East Germany); SC Leipzig | (Sweden); SoIK Hellas |
| 14 | 1973–74; Details | (West Germany); **VfL Gummersbach** | 19–17 | (Soviet Union); MAI Moscow | (Norway); Oppsal IF Oslo | (Czechoslovakia); Červená Hviezda Bratislava |
| 15 | 1974–75; Details | (East Germany); **ASK Frankfurt/Oder** | 19–17 | (Socialist Federal Republic of Yugoslavia); Borac Banja Luka | (West Germany); VfL Gummersbach | (Romania); Steaua București |
| 16 | 1975–76; Details | (Socialist Federal Republic of Yugoslavia); **Borac Banja Luka** | 17–15 | (Denmark); Fredericia KFUM | (West Germany); VfL Gummersbach | (Norway); Fredensborg/Ski |
| 17 | 1976–77; Details | (Romania); **Steaua București** | 21–20 | (Soviet Union); CSKA Moscow | (Denmark); Fredericia KFUM | (West Germany); VfL Gummersbach |
| 18 | 1977–78; Details | (East Germany); **SC Magdeburg** | 28–22 | (Poland); Śląsk Wrocław | (Hungary); Budapest Honvéd | (Spain); Calpisa |
| 19 | 1978–79; Details | (West Germany); **TV Großwallstadt** | 30–28 (14–10 / 18–16) | (East Germany); Empor Rostock | (Hungary); Budapest Honvéd | (Romania); Dinamo București |
| 20 | 1979–80; Details | (West Germany); **TV Großwallstadt** | 21–12 | (Iceland); Valur | (Czechoslovakia); Dukla Prague | (Spain); Atlético de Madrid |
| 21 | 1980–81; Details | (East Germany); **SC Magdeburg** | 52–43 (25–23 / 29–18) | (Socialist Federal Republic of Yugoslavia); Slovan Ljubljana | (Sweden); Lugi HF | (Soviet Union); CSKA Moscow |
| 22 | 1981–82; Details | (Hungary); **Budapest Honvéd** | 49–34 (25–16 / 18–24) | (Switzerland); TSV St. Otmar St. Gallen | (Denmark); FC Helsingør | (West Germany); TV Großwallstadt |
| 23 | 1982–83; Details | (West Germany); **VfL Gummersbach** | 32–29 (15–19 / 13–14) | (Soviet Union); CSKA Moscow | (Spain); Barcelona | (Socialist Federal Republic of Yugoslavia); Metaloplastika |
| 24 | 1983–84; Details | (Czechoslovakia); **Dukla Prague** | 38–38 (21–17 / 21–17) | (Socialist Federal Republic of Yugoslavia); Metaloplastika | (West Germany); VfL Gummersbach | (Hungary); Budapest Honvéd |
| 25 | 1984–85; Details | (Socialist Federal Republic of Yugoslavia); **Metaloplastika** | 49–32 (19–12 / 20–30) | (Spain); Atlético de Madrid | (Iceland); FH | (Czechoslovakia); Dukla Prague |
| 26 | 1985–86; Details | (Socialist Federal Republic of Yugoslavia); **Metaloplastika** | 54–52 (29–24 / 30–23) | (Poland); Wybrzeże Gdańsk | (Romania); Steaua București | (Spain); Atlético de Madrid |
| 27 | 1986–87; Details | (Soviet Union); **SKA Minsk** | 62–49 (32–24 / 25–30) | (Poland); Wybrzeże Gdańsk | (West Germany); TUSEM Essen | (Socialist Federal Republic of Yugoslavia); Metaloplastika |
| 28 | 1987–88; Details | (Soviet Union); **CSKA Moscow** | 36–36 (18–15 / 21–18) | (West Germany); TUSEM Essen | (Socialist Federal Republic of Yugoslavia); Metaloplastika | (Spain); Elgorriaga Bidasoa |
| 29 | 1988–89; Details | (Soviet Union); **SKA Minsk** | 61–53 (30–24 / 37–23) | (Romania); Steaua București | (East Germany); SC Magdeburg | (Sweden); HK Drott |
| 30 | 1989–90; Details | (Soviet Union); **SKA Minsk** | 53–50 (26–21 / 29–27) | (Spain); Barcelona | (West Germany); TUSEM Essen | (France); US Créteil Handball |
| 31 | 1990–91; Details | (Spain); **Barcelona** | 41–40 (23–21 / 20–17) | (Socialist Federal Republic of Yugoslavia); Proleter Zrenjanin | (Turkey); Eskişehir ETİ Bisküvi | (Soviet Union); Dynamo Astrakhan |
| 32 | 1991–92; Details | (Croatia); **Zagreb** | 50–38 (22–20 / 18–28) | (Spain); TEKA Santander | (Denmark); Kolding IF | (Spain); Barcelona |
| 33 | 1992–93; Details | (Croatia); **Zagreb** | 40–39 (22–17 / 22–18) | (Germany); SG Wallau-Massenheim | (France); Vénissieux Handball | (Spain); Barcelona |
**EHF Champions League**
| 34 | 1993–94; Details | (Spain); **TEKA Santander** | 45–43 (22–22 / 23–21) | (Portugal); ABC Braga | (Austria); UHK West Wien | (France); USAM Nîmes |
| 35 | 1994–95; Details | (Spain); **Elgorriaga Bidasoa** | 56–47 (30–20 / 27–26) | (Croatia); Zagreb | (Germany); THW Kiel | (Spain); Cantabria Santander |
| 36 | 1995–96; Details | (Spain); **Barcelona** | 46–38 (23–15 / 23–23) | (Spain); Elgorriaga Bidasoa | (Switzerland); Pfadi Winterthur | (Germany); THW Kiel |
| 37 | 1996–97; Details | (Spain); **Barcelona** | 61–45 (31–22 / 23–30) | (Croatia); Zagreb | (Slovenia); RK Celje | (Germany); THW Kiel |
| 38 | 1997–98; Details | (Spain); **Barcelona** | 56–40 (28–18 / 22–28) | (Croatia); Zagreb | (Germany); TBV Lemgo | (Slovenia); RK Celje |
| 39 | 1998–99; Details | (Spain); **Barcelona** | 51–40 (22–22 / 29–18) | (Croatia); Zagreb | (Slovenia); RK Celje | (Spain); Portland San Antonio |
| 40 | 1999–00; Details | (Spain); **Barcelona** | 54–52 (28–25 / 29–24) | (Germany); THW Kiel | (Slovenia); RK Celje | (Croatia); Zagreb |
| 41 | 2000–01; Details | (Spain); **Portland San Antonio** | 52–49 (30–24 / 25–22) | (Spain); Barcelona | (Slovenia); RK Celje | (Germany); THW Kiel |
| 42 | 2001–02; Details | (Germany); **SC Magdeburg** | 51–48 (23–21 / 30–25) | (Hungary); Veszprém | (Denmark); Kolding IF | (Spain); Portland San Antonio |
| 43 | 2002–03; Details | (France); **Montpellier** | 50–46 (27–19 / 31–19) | (Spain); Portland San Antonio | (Slovenia); RD Prule 67 | (Hungary); Veszprém |
| 44 | 2003–04; Details | (Slovenia); **RK Celje** | 62–58 (34–28 / 30–28) | (Germany); Flensburg-Handewitt | (Spain); Ciudad Real | (Germany); SC Magdeburg |
| 45 | 2004–05; Details | (Spain); **Barcelona** | 56–55 (28–27 / 29–27) | (Spain); Ciudad Real | (Slovenia); RK Celje | (France); Montpellier |
| 46 | 2005–06; Details | (Spain); **Ciudad Real** | 62–47 (19–25 / 37–28) | (Spain); Portland San Antonio | (Germany); Flensburg-Handewitt | (Hungary); Veszprém |
| 47 | 2006–07; Details | (Germany); **THW Kiel** | 57–55 (28–28 / 29–27) | (Germany); Flensburg-Handewitt | (Spain); Portland San Antonio | (Spain); Valladolid |
| 48 | 2007–08; Details | (Spain); **Ciudad Real** | 58–54 (27–29 / 25–31) | (Germany); THW Kiel | (Germany); HSV Hamburg | (Spain); Barcelona |
| 49 | 2008–09; Details | (Spain); **Ciudad Real** | 67–66 (39–34 / 33–27) | (Germany); THW Kiel | (Germany); HSV Hamburg | (Germany); Rhein-Neckar Löwen |
**New Qualifying Format + Third Place Match**
| 50 | 2009–10; Details | (Germany); **THW Kiel** | 36–34 | (Spain); Barcelona | (Spain); Ciudad Real | (Russia); Chekhovskiye Medvedi |
| 51 | 2010–11; Details | (Spain); **Barcelona** | 27–24 | (Spain); Ciudad Real | (Germany); Rhein-Neckar Löwen | (Germany); HSV Hamburg |
| 52 | 2011–12; Details | (Germany); **THW Kiel** | 26–21 | (Spain); Atlético de Madrid | (Denmark); AG København | (Germany); Füchse Berlin |
| 53 | 2012–13; Details | (Germany); **HSV Hamburg** | 30–29 | (Spain); Barcelona | (Poland); Vive Kielce | (Germany); THW Kiel |
| 54 | 2013–14; Details | (Germany); **Flensburg-Handewitt** | 30–28 | (Germany); THW Kiel | (Spain); Barcelona | (Hungary); Veszprém |
| 55 | 2014–15; Details | (Spain); **Barcelona** | 28–23 | (Hungary); Veszprém | (Poland); Vive Kielce | (Germany); THW Kiel |
| 56 | 2015–16; Details | (Poland); **Vive Kielce** | 39–38 | (Hungary); Veszprém | (France); Paris Saint-Germain | (Germany); THW Kiel |
| 57 | 2016–17; Details | (North Macedonia); **RK Vardar** | 24–23 | (France); Paris Saint-Germain | (Hungary); Veszprém | (Spain); Barcelona |
| 58 | 2017–18; Details | (France); **Montpellier** | 32–26 | (France); HBC Nantes | (France); Paris Saint-Germain | (North Macedonia); RK Vardar |
| 59 | 2018–19; Details | (North Macedonia); **RK Vardar** | 27–24 | (Hungary); Veszprém | (Spain); Barcelona | (Poland); Vive Kielce |
| 60 | 2019–20; Details | (Germany); **THW Kiel** | 33–28 | (Spain); Barcelona | (France); Paris Saint-Germain | (Hungary); Veszprém |
| 61 | 2020–21; Details | (Spain); **Barcelona** | 36–23 | (Denmark); Aalborg Håndbold | (France); Paris Saint-Germain | (France); HBC Nantes |
| 62 | 2021–22; Details | (Spain); **Barcelona** | 37–35 | (Poland); Vive Kielce | (Germany); THW Kiel | (Hungary); Veszprém |
| 63 | 2022–23; Details | (Germany); **SC Magdeburg** | 30–29 | (Poland); Vive Kielce | (Spain); Barcelona | (France); Paris Saint-Germain |
| 64 | 2023–24; Details | (Spain); **Barcelona** | 31–30 | (Denmark); Aalborg Håndbold | (Germany); THW Kiel | (Germany); SC Magdeburg |
| 65 | 2024–25; Details | (Germany); **SC Magdeburg** | 32–26 | (Germany); Füchse Berlin | (France); HBC Nantes | (Spain); Barcelona |
| 66 | 2025–26; Details | (Spain); **Barcelona** | 37–34 | (Germany); Füchse Berlin | (Germany); SC Magdeburg | (Denmark); Aalborg Håndbold |

Notes:
Bold : Aggregate
Bold-italic : Winner's goals

== Records and statistics ==
=== Winning clubs ===
Locations of the IHF European Champions Cup (1956–1993) and EHF Champions League winners (from 1994)

Performance in the European Cup/EHF Champions League by club
| Club | Winners | Runners-up | Years won | Years runner-up |
|---|---|---|---|---|
| (Spain) Barcelona | 13 | 5 | 1991, 1996, 1997, 1998, 1999, 2000, 2005, 2011, 2015, 2021, 2022, 2024, 2026 | 1990, 2001, 2010, 2013, 2020 |
| (West Germany) VfL Gummersbach | 5 | 1 | 1967, 1970, 1971, 1974, 1983 | 1972 |
| (Germany) SC Magdeburg | 5 | 0 | 1978, 1981, 2002, 2023, 2025 | — |
| (Germany) THW Kiel | 4 | 4 | 2007, 2010, 2012, 2020 | 2000, 2008, 2009, 2014 |
| (Czechoslovakia) Dukla Prague | 3 | 2 | 1957, 1963, 1984 | 1967, 1968 |
| (Spain) Ciudad Real | 3 | 2 | 2006, 2008, 2009 | 2005, 2011 |
| (Soviet Union) SKA Minsk | 3 | 0 | 1987, 1989, 1990 | — |
| (Croatia) Zagreb | 2 | 4 | 1992, 1993 | 1995, 1997, 1998, 1999 |
| (Romania) Steaua Bucureşti | 2 | 2 | 1968, 1977 | 1971, 1989 |
| (West Germany) Frisch Auf Göppingen | 2 | 1 | 1960, 1962 | 1959 |
| (Socialist Federal Republic of Yugoslavia) Metaloplastika | 2 | 1 | 1985, 1986 | 1984 |
| (West Germany) TV Großwallstadt | 2 | 0 | 1979, 1980 | — |
| (France) Montpellier | 2 | 0 | 2003, 2018 | — |
| (North Macedonia) RK Vardar | 2 | 0 | 2017, 2019 | — |
| (Socialist Federal Republic of Yugoslavia) Bjelovar | 1 | 2 | 1972 | 1962, 1973 |
| (Soviet Union) CSKA Moscow | 1 | 2 | 1988 | 1977, 1983 |
| (Spain) Portland San Antonio | 1 | 2 | 2001 | 2003, 2006 |
| (Germany) Flensburg-Handewitt | 1 | 2 | 2014 | 2004, 2007 |
| (Poland) Iskra Kielce | 1 | 2 | 2016 | 2022, 2023 |
| (Romania) Dinamo Bucureşti | 1 | 1 | 1965 | 1963 |
| (Soviet Union) MAI Moscow | 1 | 1 | 1973 | 1974 |
| (Socialist Federal Republic of Yugoslavia) Borac Banja Luka | 1 | 1 | 1976 | 1975 |
| (Hungary) Budapest Honvéd | 1 | 1 | 1982 | 1966 |
| (Spain) CB Cantabria | 1 | 1 | 1994 | 1992 |
| (Spain) Bidasoa Irún | 1 | 1 | 1995 | 1996 |
| (Sweden) Redbergslids IK | 1 | 0 | 1959 | — |
| (East Germany) DHfK Leipzig | 1 | 0 | 1966 | — |
| (East Germany) ASK Frankfurt/Oder | 1 | 0 | 1975 | — |
| (Slovenia) Celje | 1 | 0 | 2004 | — |
| (Germany) HSV Hamburg | 1 | 0 | 2013 | — |
| (Hungary) Veszprém KC | 0 | 4 | — | 2002, 2015, 2016, 2019 |
| (Poland) Wybrzeże Gdańsk | 0 | 2 | — | 1986, 1987 |
| (Denmark) Aalborg Håndbold | 0 | 2 | — | 2021, 2024 |
| (Germany) Füchse Berlin | 0 | 2 | — | 2025, 2026 |
| (Sweden) Örebro SK | 0 | 1 | — | 1957 |
| (Denmark) Aarhus GF | 0 | 1 | — | 1960 |
| (Socialist Federal Republic of Yugoslavia) Medveščak Zagreb | 0 | 1 | — | 1965 |
| (East Germany) Dynamo Berlin | 0 | 1 | — | 1970 |
| (Denmark) Fredericia KFUM | 0 | 1 | — | 1976 |
| (Poland) Śląsk Wrocław | 0 | 1 | — | 1978 |
| (East Germany) Empor Rostock | 0 | 1 | — | 1979 |
| (Iceland) Valur | 0 | 1 | — | 1980 |
| (Socialist Federal Republic of Yugoslavia) Slovan Ljubljana | 0 | 1 | — | 1981 |
| (Switzerland) TSV St. Otmar St. Gallen | 0 | 1 | — | 1982 |
| (Spain) Atlético Madrid | 0 | 1 | — | 1985 |
| (West Germany) TUSEM Essen | 0 | 1 | — | 1988 |
| (Socialist Federal Republic of Yugoslavia) Proleter Zrenjanin | 0 | 1 | — | 1991 |
| (Germany) Wallau-Massenheim | 0 | 1 | — | 1993 |
| (Portugal) ABC Braga | 0 | 1 | — | 1994 |
| (Spain) Atlético de Madrid | 0 | 1 | — | 2012 |
| (France) Paris Saint-Germain | 0 | 1 | — | 2017 |
| (France) HBC Nantes | 0 | 1 | — | 2018 |

=== Performance by country (1957-2026) ===
| Rank | Country | Winners | Runners-up | Semi-finals | Total |
|---|---|---|---|---|---|
| 1 | Spain | 19 | 13 | 20 | 52 |
| 2 | Germany | 18 | 12 | 28 | 58 |
| 3 | Soviet Union ^{[A]} | 5 | 3 | 4 | 12 |
| 4 | Yugoslavia ^{[B]} | 4 | 7 | 6 | 17 |
| 5 | East Germany | 4 | 2 | 3 | 9 |
| 6 | Romania | 3 | 3 | 7 | 13 |
| 7 | Czechoslovakia ^{[C]} | 3 | 2 | 6 | 11 |
| 8 | Croatia | 2 | 4 | 1 | 7 |
| 9 | France | 2 | 2 | 13 | 17 |
| 10 | North Macedonia | 2 | 0 | 1 | 3 |
| 11 | Hungary | 1 | 5 | 9 | 15 |
| 12 | Poland | 1 | 5 | 3 | 9 |
| 13 | Sweden | 1 | 1 | 3 | 5 |
| 14 | Slovenia | 1 | 0 | 7 | 8 |
| 15 | Denmark | 0 | 4 | 12 | 16 |
| 16 | Switzerland | 0 | 1 | 2 | 3 |
| 17 | Iceland | 0 | 1 | 1 | 2 |
| 18 | Portugal | 0 | 1 | 1 | 2 |
| 19 | Norway | 0 | 0 | 2 | 2 |
| 20 | Austria | 0 | 0 | 1 | 1 |
| 21 | Russia | 0 | 0 | 1 | 1 |
| 22 | Turkey | 0 | 0 | 1 | 1 |
| Total | | 65 | 65 | 130 | 260 |

- Since 2009–10 EHF Champions League have Third Place Match.

==== Notes ====
- ^{A} Results until the Dissolution of the Soviet Union in 1991. Three out of five titles were won by clubs from present day Belarus, while two titles and the additional three times runners-up were achieved by clubs from present day Russia.
- ^{B} Results until the Breakup of Yugoslavia in the early 1990s. Clubs from present day Serbia won the title two times and were runners-up additional two times, clubs from present day Croatia won the title once and were runners-up three times, clubs from present day Bosnia and Herzegovina won the title once and were runners-up once, while clubs from present day Slovenia were runners-up one time.
- ^{C} Results until the Dissolution of Czechoslovakia in 1993. Three titles and two times runners-up were all achieved by HC Dukla Prague.

=== All-time top scorers ===
As of the end of the 2024/25 season

| Rank | Player | Goals | Seasons | Position | ref. |
|---|---|---|---|---|---|
| 1 | (North Macedonia) Kiril Lazarov | 1482 | 20 | OB | |
| 2 | (Russia) Timur Dibirov | 1212 | 21 | W | |
| 3 | (France) Nikola Karabatić | 1211 | 18 | OB | |
| 4 | (Denmark) Mikkel Hansen | 1194 | 17 | OB | |
| 5 | (Serbia) Momir Ilić | 969 | 14 | OB | |
| 6 | (Serbia) Marko Vujin | 861 | 14 | OB | |
| 7 | (Spain) Alex Dujshebaev | 856 | 13 | OB | |
| 8 | (Croatia) Ivan Čupić | 843 | 17 | W | |
| 9 | (Belarus) Siarhei Rutenka | 838 | 13 | OB/P | |
| 10 | (Hungary) László Nagy | 806 | 17 | OB | |
| 11 | (Sweden) Niclas Ekberg | 785 | 12 | W | |
| 12 | (Poland) Kamil Syprzak | 760 | 14 | P | |
| 13 | (Croatia) Zlatko Horvat | 729 | 18 | W | |
| 14 | (Croatia) Domagoj Duvnjak | 725 | 17 | OB | |
| 15 | (Spain) Víctor Tomás | 717 | 17 | W | |
| 16 | (Germany) Uwe Gensheimer | 715 | 10 | W | |
| 17 | (France) Nedim Remili | 705 | 11 | OB | |
| 18 | (France) Dika Mem | 695 | 9 | OB | |
| 19 | (Sweden) Jonas Källman | 694 | 17 | W | |
| 20 | (Croatia) Igor Karačić | 693 | 14 | OB | |

=== All-time Final Four top scorers ===
As of the end of the 2024/25 season

| Rank | Player | Goals | Apps. |
|---|---|---|---|
| 1 | (Denmark) Mikkel Hansen | 81 | 8 |
| 2 | (Spain) Aleix Gómez | 80 | 7 |
| 3 | (France) Dika Mem | 69 | 8 |
| 4 | (North Macedonia) Kiril Lazarov | 68 | 7 |
| 5 | (Iceland) Aron Pálmarsson | 59 | 9 |
| 5 | (France) Timothey N'Guessan | 59 | 7 |
| 7 | (Serbia) Momir Ilić | 58 | 8 |
| 8 | (Sweden) Niclas Ekberg | 57 | 7 |
| 9 | (Czech Republic) Filip Jícha | 56 | 6 |
| 10 | (Hungary) László Nagy | 55 | 7 |
| 11 | (Croatia) Domagoj Duvnjak | 51 | 6 |
| 12 | (Croatia) Ivan Čupić | 49 | 7 |
| 13 | (Belarus) Siarhei Rutenka | 47 | 4 |
| 13 | (Spain) Víctor Tomás | 47 | 7 |
| 13 | (Croatia) Luka Cindrić | 47 | 7 |
| 16 | (Spain) Juanín García | 44 | 4 |
| 17 | (France) Nedim Remili | 43 | 4 |
| 18 | (Spain) Alex Dujshebaev | 42 | 4 |
| 19 | (France) Nikola Karabatić | 39 | 7 |
| 20 | (Denmark) Jesper Nøddesbo | 38 | 6 |

=== All-time top appearances ===
As of the end of the 2025/26 season

| Player | Apps | Ssns | #Clubs | Pos. | ref. |
|---|---|---|---|---|---|
| (Croatia) Mirko Alilović | 300 | 24 | 6 | GK | |
| (France) Nikola Karabatic | 281 | 22 | 4 | OB | |
| (Russia) Timur Dibirov | 277 | 21 | 3 | W | |
| (Bosnia and Herzegovina) Mirsad Terzić | 261 | 21 | 5 | OB | |
| (Serbia) / (Spain) Arpad Šterbik | 261 | 19 | 5 | GK | |
| (North Macedonia) Kiril Lazarov | 251 | 20 | 6 | OB | |
| (France) Thierry Omeyer | 243 | 18 | 3 | GK | |
| (Croatia) Manuel Štrlek | 238 | 19 | 4 | W | |
| (Hungary) Roland Mikler | 237 | 17 | 2 | GK | |
| (Croatia) Domagoj Duvnjak | 233 | 17 | 3 | OB | |
| (Croatia) Ivan Čupić | | 18 | | W | |
| (Denmark) Niklas Landin | | 18 | | GK | |
| (France) Luka Karabatic | | 18 | | P | |
| (Spain) Aitor Ariño | | 18 | | W | |
| (Croatia) Zlatko Horvat | | 18 | 1 | W | |
| (Spain) Víctor Tomás | | 17 | 1 | W | |
| (Hungary) László Nagy | | 17 | | OB | |
| (Sweden) Jonas Källman | | 17 | | W | |
| (Spain) Eduardo Gurbindo | | 16or17 | | OB | |
| (Denmark) Mikkel Hansen | | 16 | | OB | |
| (Spain) Juanín García | | 16 | | W | |
| (Croatia) Igor Karačić | | 16 | | OB | |

==== All-time Final Four top appearances - players ====
incomplete list

| Player | Ssns | #Clubs | Pos. | ref. |
|---|---|---|---|---|
| (Iceland) Aron Pálmarsson | 9 | 3 | OB | |
| (France) Dika Mem | 9 | | OB | |
| (Spain) Gonzalo Pérez de Vargas | 9 | | GK | |
| (Denmark) Mikkel Hansen | 8 | | OB | |
| (Serbia) Momir Ilić | 8 | 2 | OB | |
| (Spain) Aleix Gómez | 7 | | W | |
| (Sweden) Niclas Ekberg | 7 | | W | |
| (North Macedonia) Kiril Lazarov | 7 | 4 | OB | |
| (France) Timothey N'Guessan | 7 | | OB | |
| (Hungary) László Nagy | 7 | | OB | |
| (France) Ludovic Fabregas | 7 | | P | |
| (Spain) Aitor Ariño | 7 | | W | |
| (Croatia) Ivan Čupić | 7 | | W | |
| (Spain) Víctor Tomás | 7 | | W | |
| (Croatia) Luka Cindrić | 7 | | OB | |
| (France) Nikola Karabatić | 7 | | OB | |
| (Germany) Dominik Klein | 7 | 2 | W | |
| (Serbia) / (Spain) Arpad Šterbik | 7 | 5 | GK | |

==== All-time Final Four appearances - coaches ====
incomplete list

| Coach | Ssns | #Clubs | ref. |
|---|---|---|---|
| (Spain) Xavier Pascual | 9 | | |
| (Spain) Talant Dujshebaev | 6 | | |
| (Iceland) Alfreð Gíslason | 6 | | |
| (Spain) Carlos Ortega | 5 | | |
| (Spain) Raúl González | 5 | | |
| (Germany) Bennet Wiegert | 4 | | |

=== Most goals scored in a match ===
As of the end of the 2025/26 season
multiple entries of players are allowed
^{Q} - qualifying match

Penalty goals included (≥14)

the list is possibly incomplete for "14"

| Player | Goals | Season | ref. |
|---|---|---|---|
| (Spain) Jesús Martínez de la Cal | 17 | 2009/10 | |
| (Denmark) Mathias Gidsel | 17 | 2026/27 | |
| (Belarus) Mikail Usachov | ^{Q}16 | 2005/06 | |
| (Iceland) Guðjón Valur Sigurðsson | 16 | 2006/07 | |
| (Slovakia) František Šulc Jr. | 16 | 2010/11 | |
| (Hungary) Gábor Császár | 16 | 2019/20 | |
| (Belarus) Ivan Brovko | 15 | 2003/04 | |
| (South Korea) Yoon Kyung-shin | 15 | 2007/08 | |
| (Lithuania) Aidenas Malašinskas | 15 | 2008/09 | |
| (Denmark) Henrik Knudsen | 15 | 2009/10 | |
| (Germany) Uwe Gensheimer | 15 | 2010/11 | |
| (Denmark) Mikkel Hansen | 15 | 2014/15 | |
| (Germany) Tim Freihöfer | 15 | 2026/27 | |
| (Iceland) Ólafur Stefánsson | 14 | 2002/03 | |
| (North Macedonia) Kiril Lazarov | 14 | 2005/06 | |
| (North Macedonia) Kiril Lazarov #2 | 14 | 2006/07 | |
| (Austria) Roland Schlinger | ^{Q}14 | 2008/09 | |
| (Russia) Andrey Mochalov | ^{Q}14 | 2008/09 | |
| (Slovenia) Luka Žvižej | 14 | 2009/10 | |
| (Germany) Uwe Gensheimer #2 | 14 | 2013/14 | |
| (Hungary) Gábor Császár #2 | 14 | 2015/16 | |
| (Slovenia) Žiga Mlakar | 14 | 2017/18 | |
| (France) Elohim Prandi | 14 | 2025/26 | |
| (France) Mattéo Fadhuile | 14 | 2026/27 | |
| (Portugal) Francisco Costa | 14 | 2026/27 | |

Most goals scored in a single EHF FINAL4 match is 13 by Juanín García.

Goalkeepers

1. (Spain) Gonzalo Pérez de Vargas 3 2020/21, (France) Thierry Omeyer 3 2018/19

Without penalty goals (≥12)

the list is possibly incomplete for "13"

| Player | Goals | Season | ref. |
|---|---|---|---|
| (Denmark) Mathias Gidsel | 17 | 2026/27 | |
| (Iceland) Guðjón Valur Sigurðsson | 14-16 | 2006/07 | |
| (Spain) Jesús Martínez de la Cal | 14 | 2009/10 | |
| (Slovenia) Žiga Mlakar | 14 | 2017/18 | |
| (France) Elohim Prandi | 14 | 2025/26 | |
| (Slovakia) František Šulc Jr. | 13 | 2010/11 | |
| (Denmark) Mathias Gidsel #2 | 13 | 2025/26 | |
| (Denmark) Mathias Gidsel #3 | 13 | 2025/26 | |
| (Denmark) Mathias Gidsel #4 | 12or13 | 2025/26 | |
| (Germany) Tim Freihöfer | 12 | 2026/27 | |
| (Belarus) Ivan Brovko | 11-15 | 2003/04 | |
| (North Macedonia) Kiril Lazarov | 11-14 | 2005/06 | |
| (North Macedonia) Kiril Lazarov #2 | 11-14 | 2006/07 | |
| (Iceland) Ólafur Stefánsson | 11-14 | 2002/03 | |
| (Germany) Uwe Gensheimer | 11-14 | 2013/14 | |
| (Belarus) Mikail Usachov | ^{Q}9-16 | 2005/06 | |

Matches (≥5) with at least 10 goals

the list is incomplete

| Player | No. of Games | ref. |
|---|---|---|
| (North Macedonia) Kiril Lazarov | ≥18 | |
| (Belarus) / (Slovenia) Siarhei Rutenka | ≥15 | |
| (Germany) Uwe Gensheimer | ≥15 | |
| (Denmark) Mathias Gidsel | ≥14 | |
| (Spain) Aleix Gómez | ≥14 | |
| (Denmark) Mikkel Hansen | ≥13 | |
| (Serbia) Marko Vujin | ≥10 | |
| (Denmark) Lars Christiansen | ≥10 | |
| (Czech Republic) Filip Jícha | ≥8 | |
| (France) Elohim Prandi | ≥7 | |
| (Poland) Kamil Syprzak | ≥7 | |
| (Spain) Alex Dujshebaev | ≥7 | |
| (Croatia) Mirza Džomba | ≥7 | |
| (Portugal) Francisco Costa | ≥7 | |
| (Iceland) Guðjón Valur Sigurðsson | ≥6 | |
| (Serbia) Nenad Peruničić | ≥6 | |
| (Croatia) Zlatko Saračević | ≥6 | |
| (Portugal) Martim Costa | ≥5 | |
| (France) Melvyn Richardson | ≥5 | |
| (France) Nedim Remili | ≥5 | |
| (Serbia) Momir Ilić | ≥5 | |
| (Iceland) Ólafur Stefánsson | ≥5 | |
| (Hungary) Gábor Császár | ≥5 | |
| (Denmark) Hans Lindberg | ≥5 | |
| (Denmark) Anders Eggert | ≥5 | |
| (Croatia) Mario Šoštarić | ≥5 | |
| (Croatia) Zlatko Horvat | ≥5 | |
| (Denmark) Frederik Bjerre | ≥4 | |
| (France) Dika Mem | ≥4 | |
| (Spain) Ferran Solé | ≥4 | |

=== Goals scored in the Final Four by nations ===
All the goals (4 078) scored in the Final Four by the nationality of the players.

Last updated after the 2025/26 season.

| Rank | Nation | Goals |
|---|---|---|
| 1 | France | 627 |
| 2 | Spain | 588 |
| 3 | Denmark | 407 |
| 4 | Germany | 398 |
| 5 | Sweden | 260 |
| 6 | Croatia | 255 |
| 7 | Iceland | 215 |
| 8 | Poland | 189 |
| 9 | Slovenia | 180 |
| 10 | Serbia | 166 |
| 11 | Hungary | 123 |
| 12 | Norway | 93 |

| Rank | Nation | Goals |
|---|---|---|
| 13 | Belarus | 85 |
| 14 | Russia | 78 |
| 15 | North Macedonia | 76 |
| 16 | Czech Republic | 56 |
| 17 | Netherlands | 35 |
| 18 | Portugal | 34 |
| 19 | Montenegro | 33 |
| 20 | Latvia | 32 |
| 21 | Brazil | 25 |
| 22 | Egypt | 25 |
| 23 | Austria | 17 |
| 24 | Faroe Islands | 17 |

| Rank | Nation | Goals |
|---|---|---|
| 25 | Ukraine | 11 |
| 26 | Tunisia | 9 |
| 27 | Argentina | 7 |
| 28 | Switzerland | 7 |
| 29 | Algeria | 6 |
| 30 | Lithuania | 4 |
| 31 | (Bosnia and Herzegovina) Bosnia-Herzegovina | 3 |
| 32 | Italy | 3 |
| 33 | Iran | 2 |
| 34 | Slovakia | 2 |

=== Coaches with most titles ===
| Coach | Titles | Clubs | |
| Coach | Titles | # | List |
|---|---|---|---|
| (Spain) Valero Rivera | 6 | 1 | Barcelona 1991, 1996, 1997, 1998, 1999, 2000 |
| (Spain) Talant Dujshebaev | 4 | 2 | Ciudad Real 2006, 2008, 2009, Kielce 2016 |
| (Spain) Xavier Pascual | 3 | 1 | Barcelona 2011, 2015, 2021 |
| (Iceland) Alfreð Gíslason | 3 | 2 | Magdeburg 2002, Kiel 2010, 2012 |
| (Spain) Carlos Ortega | 3 | 1 | Barcelona 2022, 2024, 2026 |
| (Russia) Spartak Mironovitch | 3 | 1 | SKA Minsk 1987, 1989, 1990 |

* (Germany) Horst Dreischang won titles with Gummersbach in 1967 and 1970. He was Gummersbach's coach until 29 January 1971, just after 1st game of Champions League 1/4 finals, which Gummersbach won with 11 goals lead. Gummersbach won the title that year.

==== As Player and Coach combined ====
| Player/Coach | Titles | as Player | | as Coach | |
| Player/Coach | Titles | # | List | # | List |
|---|---|---|---|---|---|
| (Spain) Carlos Ortega | 9 | 6 | Barcelona 1996, 1997, 1998, 1999, 2000, 2005 | 3 | Barcelona 2022, 2024, 2026 |
| (Spain) Talant Dujshebaev | 6 | 2 | CSKA Moscow 1988, Teka Santander 1994 | 4 | Ciudad Real 2006, 2008, 2009, Kielce 2016 |
| (Spain) Roberto García Parrondo | 3 | 2 | Ciudad Real 2008, 2009 | 1 | Vardar 2019 |
| (Czech Republic) Filip Jicha | 3 | 2 | THW Kiel 2010, 2012 | 1 | THW Kiel 2020 |
| (Germany) Bennet Wiegert | 3 | 1 | SC Magdeburg 2002 | 2 | SC Magdeburg 2023, 2025 |

== Prize money ==
In addition to the sporting prestige of winning the EHF Champions League, the competition also provides financial rewards for participating clubs. For the EHF FINAL4, the European Handball Federation (EHF) allocates a total prize fund of €750,000: the winners receive €300,000, the runners-up €225,000, while the third- and fourth-placed teams obtain €150,000 and €75,000 respectively.

Clubs also receive income throughout the competition. During the group stage, each participating team earns €10,000 per match played, as well as an additional €5,000 for every point won. The first two teams in each group are awarded a further €20,000 qualification bonus for direct entry into the quarter-finals. In the play-offs and quarter-finals, teams continue to receive €10,000 per match, with bonuses between €6,000 and €7,000 per point depending on the stage.

As a result, the overall revenues can be significant. In the 2024–25 season, for example, Füchse Berlin (runners-up) earned around €540,000, HBC Nantes approximately €455,000 after finishing third, and FC Barcelona about €379,000 following their semi-final exit. The 2025 champions, SC Magdeburg, received €300,000 for the title and became eligible for an additional prize of up to €300,000 by participating in the IHF Super Globe in Saudi Arabia in November 2025.

== Sponsorship ==
- Select Sport
- Hummel International

== See also ==
- EHF European League
- EHF European Cup
