= Gracemount Edinburgh Handball Club =

Scottish handball club

Gracemount Edinburgh H.C
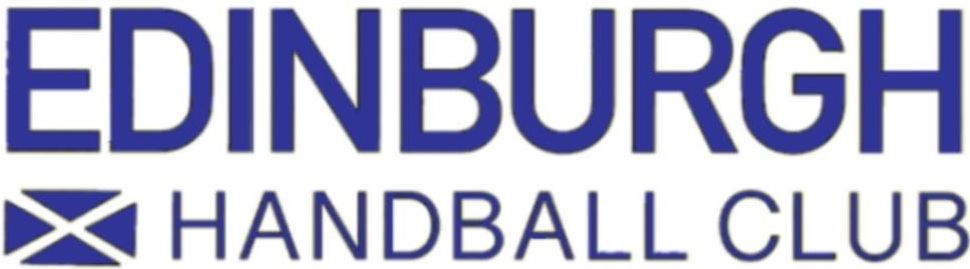
- Full name: Gracemount Edinburgh Handball Club
- Nickname: Gracemount
- Founded: 2002, as Gracemount Eagles H.C.
- Head coach: (Scotland) Fred Wallace
- Captain: (France) Mounir Iddir
- League: Scottish Handball League
- 2008/09 (1): League, 2nd.
Home	Away

Gracemount Edinburgh Handball Club was formed in 2002 by Fred Wallace as part of the rebirth of the Scottish Handball Association. In the beginning, the club started with about ten 11- to 13-year-old children training once a week, learning basic ball control skills. Over the next 6 years though, the club has expanded hugely and now boasts a sizeable youth team and a large senior men's team.

The club has operated out of numerous venues in the southside of Edinburgh. In the beginning, the local leisure centre at Gracemount was used but as the club expanded there was a need for more regular training sessions and better facilities. Since 2005, GEHC have been training at high schools at Liberton and Gracemount, both with new sports facilities available.

From 2006 onwards, GEHC has seen a large influx of foreign students joining the team while studying in Edinburgh. These students, mainly from mainland Europe have had previous experience with Handball as it is a professional sport on the continent. Due to this, the less experienced Scottish players have been learning from a vast pool of experience and improving rapidly.

== Early years ==
For the first 3 years of Gracemount's existence, the club was solely focused on Youth development. Over the course of those 3 years, Gracemount took teams to the Partille Cup in Sweden. Results became gradually better over the years, but due to the scale of the sport in other countries, Gracemount lost most of their games to strong European teams. Despite this, the experience was extremely valuable as the young players were introduced to different styles of play and were able to witness handball played by experienced teams.

In 2004, many of the older Gracemount players were selected to represent the Scotland U-16 squad, and played games against England, Ireland and a German regional team. The Gracemount players in the squad were very influential in the Scotland U-16 squad's victory over Ireland in the Liverpool Tri-Nations Tournament.

== 2005 – present ==
Since 2005, Gracemount have been competing in the Scottish Senior Men's League. At first, Gracemount's youth players made up much of the team and played against Men's teams like Tryst 77 and Glasgow. Over the last 2 years though, Gracemount has seen a large influx of older players which has allowed the club to expand rapidly. 2007/08 proved to be a promising season for the club, with the high point being a very credible performance against Great Dane HC, widely recognised as the best Handball Club in Britain.

2008 has seen the club expand even more, with 25-30 men training regularly. This allowed Gracemount to enter 2 teams into the Scottish league, with 1 team focused on mounting a title challenge while the 2nd team worked on development for the younger or less experienced players. This proved to be a success for Gracemount. The first team missed out on the Pre-Xmas title with a 29–28 loss to Glasgow HC. A win by 1 goal would have secured the title for Gracemount, but finishing second in the league ahead of defending champions Tryst 77 HC is still considered the club's greatest achievement to date. Gracemount's second team in the league also put in some promising performances, showing very clearly that they were not at all far behind the other teams in the league.

The season 2009/10 became the season where the club achieved its goal of winning the Scottish Senior Men's League by winning 11 of 12 games and drawing one game 32–32 to Glasgow HC. The final game against Cumbernauld HC saw a fairly amputated Gracemount team, that due to the Icelandic Eyjafjallajökull volcanic eruption, had some players stuck in their native countries. However, the team managed to win 41–38 against Cumbernauld HC. The next goal is to win the Scottish Cup 2009/10.

== World Class Handball Program ==
Over recent years, the British Handball Association have been sending British handball players to Denmark to train with the World Class Handball Program in preparation for the London 2012 Olympics. Many Scottish players are involved in this process, including 1 Gracemount player, Taylor Hoven. Alan Stokes spent 3 years training in Denmark and playing for Danish club Braband in preparation for 2012. Taylor Hoven is part of the 2016 Olympic Program.
