= László Nagy =

László Nagy may refer to:

- László Nagy (canoeist), Hungarian sprint canoeist
- László Nagy (figure skater) (1927–2005), Hungarian figure skater
- László Nagy (footballer) (born 1949), Hungarian footballer
- László Nagy (handballer) (born 1981), Hungarian handball player
- László Nagy (poet) (1925–1978), Hungarian poet
- László Nagy (Scouting) (1921–2009), Hungarian-Swiss jurist, writer and scouting pioneer
- László B. Nagy (born 1958), Hungarian politician
- László Moholy-Nagy (1895–1946), Hungarian artist and designer
