= Kolbotn Håndball =

Norwegian handball club

Kolbotn IL Håndball
- Full name: Kolbotn Idrettslag Håndball
- Short name: Kolbotn
- Founded: 1940; 86 years ago
- Arena: Sofiemyrhallen
- President: Kyrre Johannesen
- Head coach: Eivind Åsheim
- League: 2024-25
- Club colours
Home	Away

Kolbotn IL Handball is a sub-section under Kolbotn IL, one of the largest sports clubs in Norway. The club started handball in 1940 and organized Handball as a semi-autonomous sub-section in 1960. The multisports club was founded in 1915 under the name Kullebunden Idrætsklub with Normand Nilsen as its first chairman. The club later changed its name to Kolbotn Idrettsklubb (KIK).

== Achievements ==
=== Handball, Men ===
The men's team played in the National League for 13 years between 1975 and 1988. They have won 2 titles.

- 1983 National League, winner
- 1984 National League, winner
- 1985 National League, runner up

== Notable Athletes ==
- Runar Bauer
- Vidar Bauer
- Gunnar Fosseng

== See also ==
- Kolbotn IL
- Kolbotn Fotball
- Kolbotn Wrestling
