= Jiří Kotrč =

Czech handball player

Jiří Kotrč (born 25 June 1960 in Prague) is a Czech former handball player who competed in the 1988 Summer Olympics.
