= Karel Jindřichovský =

Czech handball player

Karel Jindřichovský (born 28 September 1966) is a Czech former handball player who competed in the 1988 Summer Olympics.
