= Milan Brestovanský =

Czech handball player (born 1957)

Milan Brestovanský (born 18 May 1957 in Trnava) is a Slovak former handball player who competed in the 1988 Summer Olympics.
