= František Štika =

Czech handball player

František Štika (born 15 January 1960 in Prague) is a Czech former handball player who competed in the 1988 Summer Olympics.
