= Jan Novák (handballer) =

Czech handball player (born 1960)

Jan Novák (born 5 April 1960 in Gottwaldov) is a Czech former handball player who competed in the 1988 Summer Olympics.
