= Jiří Liška (handballer) =

Czech handball player (born 1952)

Jiří Liška (born 14 August 1952 in Písek) is a Czech former handball player who competed for Czechoslovakia in the 1976 Summer Olympics.

In 1976 he was part of the Czechoslovak team which finished 7th in the Olympic tournament. He played two matches and scored one goal.
