= Scottish Handball Association =

Handball governing body in Scotland

Scottish Handball Association SHA
- IOC nation: Scotland (SCO)
- Sport: Handball
- Other sports: Beach Handball; Wheelchair handball
- Official website: www.handball.scot

HISTORY
- Year of formation: 1972

AFFILIATIONS
- International federation: International Handball Federation (IHF)
- IHF member since: 2017
- Continental association: European Handball Federation
- National Olympic Committee: British Olympic Association
- Other affiliation(s): Commonwealth Handball Association; British Handball Association

GOVERNING BODY
- President: Ian McKinven

HEADQUARTERS
- Address: Caledonia House, 1 Redheughs Rigg, South Gyle, Edinburgh
- Country: Scotland
- Secretary General: Stephen Neilson

The Scottish Handball Association is the governing body for non-International Handball Federation related matters of team handball in Scotland while the British Handball Association has governance over matters relating to the International Handball Federation. The SHA is a member of the European Handball Federation (EHF) and the Commonwealth Handball Association (CHA).

== History ==
The Association was formed in 1972

== Scottish teams ==
Location of Teams in the Senior Men's Scottish Handball League 2009/10
- Armadale
- Ayr
- Broxburn
- Cumbernauld
- Dundee Handball Club
- EK82 Handball Club
- Edinburgh Eagles
- Falkirk
- Glasgow
- Gracemount Edinburgh Handball Club
- Kirkliston
- Liberton
- Linlithgow
- Livingston
- Na Feidh
- Troon
- Tryst 77
- Whitburn

== Scottish National League champions ==
Year	Men	Women
1973/74	EK HC	EK HC
1974/75	EK HC	EK HC
1975/76	EK HC	EK HC
1976/77	EK HC	EK HC
1977/78	EK HC/Barrhead Handball Club	EK HC
1978/79	EK HC	Strathclyde Satellites HC
1979/80		Strathclyde Satellites HC
1980/81		Strathclyde Satellites HC
1981/82		Strathclyde Satellites HC
1982/83	EK82 HC	Strathclyde Satellites HC
1983/84	EK82 HC	Strathclyde Satellites HC
2000/01	Falkirk	
2001/02	Tryst 77 HC	
2002/03	Edinburgh Eagles	
2003/04	Tryst 77 HC	
2004/05	Tryst 77 HC	
2005/06	Tryst 77 HC	
2006/07	Tryst 77 HC	Glasgow HC
2007/08	Tryst 77 HC	Glasgow HC
2008	Glasgow HC	
2009	Tryst 77 HC	Glasgow HC
2009/10	Gracemount HC	Glasgow HC
2010–11	Tryst 77 HC	
2011–12	Tryst 77 HC	
2012–13	Tryst 77 HC	
2013–14	Tryst 77 HC	
2014-15	Glasgow HC	
2015-16	Glasgow HC	
2016-17	Livingston HC	
2017-18	Glasgow HC	
2018-19	Glasgow HC	
2019-20	N/A	
2020-21	N/A	

== Scottish National Cup finals ==
Full details of past winners and the current season's fixtures/results can be found at the SHA Cup page.

== Scottish League season 2009/10 ==
The Scottish Handball League Championship Campaign commenced in October 2009. All league games will be played at Blackburn, West Lothian.

This year seven teams from across central Scotland will be taking part in the league campaign, for full details of results and fixtures see the Scottish Handball Season 2009/10 page.

The Scottish Cup Competition will be contested by 7 sides from across Scotland, with Ayr HC being replaced by Glasgow University HC. The 2009/10 season fixtures and results can be view on the SHA Cup page.

=== League table 2009/10 ===
Team	P	W	L	D	G F	G A	G D	Pts
Gracemount HC	12	11	0	1	473	307	166	23
Cumbernauld HC	12	9	3	0	327	261	66	18
Glasgow HC	12	8	3	1	406	318	88	17
Tryst 77 HC	12	6	6	0	337	267	70	12
Liberton HC	12	5	7	0	307	335	-28	10
Ayr HC	12	2	10	0	262	386	-124	4
EK82 HC	12	0	12	0	274	511	-237	0

== Scottish national team ==
The Scottish National squad have competed in the European Handball Federation Men's Challenge Trophy since 2005, and will enter a team into this year's tournament at the end of October 2009.

=== EHF Challenge Trophy ===
The Challenge Trophy is an International Handball Tournament held by the EHF for developing Handball Nations.

=== 2005 EHF Men's Challenge Trophy ===
The 2005 tournament was held in Dublin, Ireland. Scotland finished in a respectable third place beating England in the play-offs.

==== Group stages ====
Scotland's fixtures were as follows:

Home team	Away team	Score
Moldova	Scotland	30:14
Scotland	Azerbaijan	16:27
Scotland	Malta	16:12
England	Scotland	20:17
Ireland	Scotland	21:24

==== Group table ====
The final standings after all group matches were completed was as follows

Team	P	W	D	L	F	A	GD	Pts
Moldova	5	5	0	0	185	82	103	10
Azerbaijan	5	4	0	1	156	82	74	8
England	5	2	0	3	98	121	-23	4
Scotland	5	2	0	3	87	110	-23	4
Malta	5	2	0	3	90	133	-43	4
Ireland	5	0	0	5	85	173	-88	0

==== Third and fourth place play-off ====
Home team	Away team	Score
England	Scotland	18:24

==== Final standings ====
	Team
1st	Moldova
2nd	Azerbaijan
3rd	Scotland
4th	England
5th	Malta
6th	Ireland

=== 2007 EHF Men's Challenge Trophy ===
The 2007 Challenge Trophy took on a different format. There were 2 groups this time around, one with 4 teams with the group matches taking place in Georgia, and the other with 6 teams and the group matches taking place in Luxembourg. The winner of the two groups then faced each other in the Final, in Drammen, Norway.

Scotland were drawn in Group L, and played their matches in Luxembourg.

==== Group L ====
Scotland's fixtures were as follows:

Home team	Away team	Score
Scotland	England	20:31
Malta	Scotland	20:21
Faroe Islands	Scotland	58:19
Scotland	Luxembourg	24:37
Scotland	Ireland	23:27

==== Group L table ====
The final standings after all group matches were completed was as follows

Team	P	W	D	L	F	A	GD	Pts
Luxembourg	5	5	0	0	199	95	104	10
Faroe Islands	5	4	0	1	201	106	95	8
England	5	3	0	2	107	132	-25	6
Ireland	5	1	1	3	112	168	-56	3
Scotland	5	1	0	4	107	173	-66	2
Malta	5	0	1	4	93	145	-52	1

=== 2009 EHF Men's Challenge Trophy ===
Scotland will again compete in the EHF Men's Challenge Trophy with the group phase taking place between 30 October and 1 November 2009. This year's tournament consists of two groups, Group G1 being based in Moldova and Group G2 based in Malta, of 4 teams playing each other once in a round robin format with the winners of the group stages facing each other in the Final to be held in Linz, Austria.

==== Group G2 ====
Scotland's fixtures were as follows:

Home team	Away team	Score
Scotland	Finland	14:38
Malta	Scotland	34:21
Ireland	Scotland	35:29

==== Group G2 table ====
Team	P	W	D	L	F	A	GD	Pts
Finland	3	3	0	0	113	53	60	6
Malta	3	2	0	1	90	78	12	4
Ireland	3	1	0	2	74	103	-29	2
Scotland	3	0	0	3	64	107	-43	0
