= Partille Cup =

International handball competition

Partille Cup, started by the handball club IK Sävehof, is the world's largest annual tournament in handball in terms of number of participants. The tournament is played every year during one week in July by young people in the ages between 10 and 21 years old.

== History ==
Partille Cup was started by the handball club IK Sävehof. When the tournament started in 1970 Partille Cup was played in the small town of Partille. In 2001 the tournament started to move into Gothenburg, and was completely moved in 2004. Today Partille Cup is the world's largest and most international youth handball tournament. The event takes place in Gothenburg during week 27 every summer. Since the start, over 400 000 participants from 90 countries and six continents have participated. In July 2019, Partille Cup was played for the 50th consecutive year.

Heden, in central Gothenburg, is the tournaments heart with 30 fields and Heden Center: with information, sponsor village, sales and activities. Additional playing field areas are Kviberg, Valhalla and Överåsvallen. In total, over 60 fields are being used and more than 4000 games are played. The tournament is played outdoors on artificial grass but the A- finals will be played indoors at the Scandinavium Arena and Valhalla Sportshall. In addition to the games, there is several peripheral activities for the participants. As the Opening Ceremony, Leaders Party and Players Club. Other arrangements are European Open Championship, a national tournament for boys and girls 18/19 years, and Solidarity Camp, dedicated for developing countries in handball. These events are organized with the European Handball Federation, the International Handball Federation and Olympic Committee.

The participants, aged between 10 and 21 years, are staying mostly at schools around Gothenburg, but many participants also choose to stay in hotels. Organizer of Partille Cup is the handball club IK Sävehof . The organization consists of four full-time and around 30 additional project managers prior to the tournament start. During the week, the organization consists of a total of 1,500 officers.

Partille Cup – World of Handball
