= EK82 Handball Club =

Scottish handball club

- Full name: East Kilbride 82 Handball Club
- Founded: 1972, 1982 as EK82 HC
- Arena: Alistair McCoist Complex and john wright sports centre. East Kilbride, South Lanarkshire, Scotland
- President: (Scotland) Scot Mowat
- Head coach: (Scotland) Michael Lavery
- League: Scottish Handball League
Home	Away

EK82 Handball Club are a handball Club based in East Kilbride, in the South Lanarkshire area of Scotland. They play in the Scottish League which is regulated by the Scottish Handball Association.

== History ==
East Kilbride Handball Club was started in 1972, the same year that the Scottish Handball Association was formed, and was based in the John Wright Sports Centre. Also in this year the EK Ladies Team took part in the first ever Ladies Handball Match in Great Britain against a team from Bell College, Hamilton. In 1982 East Kilbride Handball Club merged with a club from Barrhead called Allander Handball Club to form EK82 Handball Club, and went on to win both the Scottish and British Leagues, winning the honour of representing the British Handball Association in the European Cup of 1983/84. The following season, 1983/84, EK82 retained both the Scottish and British Championships and represented Scotland at the Natwest Inter 84 Tournament hosted by Whitchurch Bristol Handball Club. In 2004 the juniors entered the Partille Cup, the largest handball tournament in the world. In 2009 the Juniors won the Scottish League and Cup double. Ek's u21 development squad have won the Scottish second division for three seasons running 2013/2014 and 2015. In season 2015/16 east kilbride coach Michael Lavery realised his dream when his primary schools development programme which started in 2006 produced a dozen players to the standard required to compete in the first division. East kilbride went to their first scottish cup final, defeating Livingston and Edinburgh and only failing at the final hurdle to Glasgow in the final. The average age of ek was 18. In the league season they defeated Glasgow and Tryst 77 for the first time in over 20 years to finish 4th. Thanks to East kilbride's continuing development programme there was representation at all age groups in season 15/16, the mini team finished fourth and the u16 team reached the semi-final of the scottish cup. The club membership has risen from 30 to 50 this season.

=== European Cup ===
EK82's opponents in their only European Cup adventure was THW Kiel of Germany. The first leg was played at the Kiel Ostseehalle, in Germany in front of a crowd of 5000 on 30 September 1983, a game which East Kilbride were to lose 43:8 (21:2 at half time). The second leg was played in the Cogenkrooghalle, Neustadt in Germany in front of an 800 capacity crowd on 3 October 1983. Again the home side were to lose to the German Champions, this by a score of 6:44 (2:18 at half time) ending their run in the competition.

=== European Cup Winners Cup ===
East Kilbride represented Great Britain in the European Cup Winners Cup during season 1975/76.

East Kilbride were drawn against the Belgian outfit, Progres HC Seraing, in a 2 legged encounter.

The first match was at the John Wright Sports Centre in front of a crowd of 500 spectators, a match which the home side were to lose 17-43.

The return leg saw East Kilbride lose 7-35.

== Club honours ==
=== Senior Men ===
- British League champions 1982/83
- Scottish League Champions 1973/74, 1974/75, 1975/76, 1976/77, 1977/78 (shared with Barrhead Handball Club), 1978/79, 1982/83, 1983/84
- Scottish Cup Champions 1973/74, 1975/76, 1976/77, 1977/78, 1978/79
- EK Shield Winners 1972, 1973, 1974, 1975, 1977, 1978
- Heriot-Watt Championship 1975, 1976
- Cumbernauld Championship 1978, 1979
- S.I.P (Denmark) Shield 1979
- Long John International Champions 1978

- Second division champions 2012/13,2013/14 and 2014/15.
- Newcastle International handball tournament 2014 Runners up.
- Scottish cup runners up 2016.2018
- Tom cooper international tournament 2017&2019 winners.

=== Senior Ladies ===
- British Champions 1974/75
- British Championship Runners Up 1975/76, 1976/77, 1977/78
- Scottish Champions 1973/74, 1974/75, 1975/76, 1976/77, 1977/78
- Scottish Cup Winners 1973/74, 1974/75, 1975/76, 1976/77, 1977/78, 1978/79
- EK Shield Winners 1974, 1975, 1976, 1977, 1978
- EK Pernod Trophy Winners 1977, 1978
- North West England Champions 1978
- BP Scotland Champions 1979

=== Juniors ===
- North West England Champions 1977
- BP Scotland Champions 1977
- Scottish League Champions (u-13's Mixed) 2008/09
- Scottish Cup Champions (u-13's Mixed) 2008/09
- Scottish Cup Champions (u-13's Girls) 2008/09
- Scottish Cup Runners Up (u-16's Girls) 2008/09
- Scottish Cup Runners Up (u-11's Mixed) 2008/09

- Scottish cup champions (girls) 2010/11 2011/12 2012/13
- Scottish cup champions (boys) 2009/10 2010/11 2012/13
- Scottish cup champions (02/03 boys) 2016/17 2017/18 2018/19

== Minis ==
Minis are children Under 11 who play in a shortened version of handball called Mini Handball. The club compete in Mini Handball Tournaments up and down the country.

== Primary Schools Development ==
Ek handball club operated a local Primary school development programme in partnership with active schools. All of the primary schools in east kilbride are offered taster sessions and a chance to play in Handball festivals. There is also the stepping stone to training and playing with Ek82 handball club at the john wright sports centre or at the Alistair mccoist complex'

Primary schools that took part in 2014/15:

- Murray / Hunter / St Louise
- Greenhills/ St Leonards/ Halfmerke
- Heathery Knowe/ Long calderwood/ Southpark
- St Hilary's/ Maxwellton / St Vincents

Maxwellton, Southpark and Heathery Knowe won the honours at this year's primary school festivals. Heathery Knowe went on to represent the EK schools at the national primary school championships at Ravenscraig and finished 5th out of 16 teams.

In 2016 Maxwellton primary won the scottish primary school championships after receiving taster sessions from EK development coach Michael Lavery and going on to win the local schools festival to qualify for the national championships.

== Sponsor ==
- EK82 HC Men's team were sponsored by the Montomerie Arms from between 2012 and 2014
- 2010/11 The Senior Club received Awards for All funding, which has been used to purchase new strips and equipment as well as subsidise training and registration costs for this season.
- 2015/ Sportcotland award Ek82 direct club funding. Ek Handball club will have their first part-time coach for a minimum of 4 years. This position is supported by sportscotland and Scottish Handball.

2017. Ek82 are now sponsored by Andrew Crawford jewellers and engravers & the watch repair centre in East kilbride.
