= 2014–15 Russian Handball Super League =

Super League
- Season: 2014–15

The 2014–15 Russian Handball Super League is the 23rd season of the Super League, Russian premier Handball league.

== Team information ==
Locations of the 2014–15 Russian Handball Super League

The following 12 clubs compete in the Super League during the 2014–15 season:

Team	Location	Arena	Capacity
Chekhovskiye Medvedi	Chekhov	Olimpiysky Sport Palace	3,000
Dinamo Viktor	Stavropol		
Energiya	Voronezh		
Fakel	Taganrog		
Kaustik	Volgograd	Sport Hall "Dinamo"	1,500
Lokomotiv	Chelyabinsk		
Permskie Medvedi	Perm	V.P. Sukharev Sport Complex	
SKIF	Krasnodar	Krasnodar Arena	2,500
Songul	Snezhinsk		
St. Petersburg	St. Petersburg	Yubileyny Sports Palace	7,700
SSAU	Saratov		
Zarya Kaspiya	Astrakhan		

=== Personnel and kits ===
Following is the list of clubs competing in 2014–15 Russian Handball Super League, with their president, head coach, kit manufacturer and shirt sponsor.

Team	President	Head coach	Kit manufacturer	Shirt sponsor(s)
Chekhovskiye Medvedi	Alexander Aravin	(Russia) Vladimir Maksimov	hummel	—
Dinamo Viktor			Kempa	Delfin sport
Energiya				
Fakel	Simon Vladimir Yaroslavovich	(Russia) Vladimir Shilchenko	adidas	—
Kaustik	Oleg Grebnev	(Russia) Dimitri Botcharnikov	adidas	Zirax
Lokomotiv			hummel	RZD
Permskie Medvedi	Alexander Kirilenko	(Russia) Lev Voronin	Nike	permenergosbyt, Ingosstrakh
SKIF	Oleg Chodkov	(Russia) Roman Fitilev	Erima	
Songul				
St. Petersburg		(Russia) Dmitri Torgovanov	Erima	—
SSAU			hummel	—
Zarya Kaspiya	Valery Prozorovski		Kempa	Lukoil

== Regular season ==
=== Standings ===
	Team	Pld	W	D	L	GF	GA	Diff	Pts
1	Chekhovskiye Medvedi	9	9	0	0			+	18
2	Kaustik Volgograd	11	10	0	1			+	20
3	Saint Petersburg HC	11	7	2	2			+	16
4	Permskie Medvedi	11	7	1	3			+	15
5	SKIF Krasnodar	11	6	0	5			−	12
6	Lokomotiv Chelyabinsk	10	4	1	5			−	9
7	Zarya Kaspiya Astrakhan	11	3	1	7			−	7
8	SSAU Saratov	10	3	0	7			−	6
9	Dinamo Viktor Stavropol	11	2	1	8			−	5
10	Energiya Voronezh	10	2	0	8			−	4
11	Songul Snezhinsk	10	2	0	8			−	4

Championship Playoff
Relegation Playoff

Pld - Played; W - Won; L - Lost; GF - Goals for; GA - Goals against; Diff - Difference; Pts - Points.
