= 2016–17 Russian Handball Super League =

Superleague
- Season: 2016–17
- Champions: Chekhovskiye Medvedi (16th title)
- All statistics correct as of 14 June 2017.

The 2016–17 Russian Handball Super League was the 25th season of the top men's professional team handball league in Russia. A total of twelve teams competed in the tournament. Chekhovskiye Medvedi won the championship title, marking their 16th consecutive victory.

== Format ==
The competition format for the 2016–17 season comprised a double round-robin system, with each team playing its opponents in home-and-away fixtures. Following the conclusion of the regular season, the top eight teams advanced to the championship play-offs, while the bottom four teams entered the relegation round. The lowest-ranked team at the end of the relegation round was demoted to the second-tier league.

== Teams ==
2016–17 Superleague teams

The following 12 clubs competed in the Super league during the 2016–17 season:

Team	City	Arena
Chekhovskiye Medvedi	Chekhov	Olimpiysky Sport Palace
Universitet-Neva	Saint Petersburg	SDUSHOR Kirovskogo
SKIF Krasnodar	Krasnodar	Olympus Arena
Dinamo Viktor Stavropol	Stavropol	Sports Complex Olimp
SSAU-Saratov	Saratov	Yubileynyy Sports Center
Dinamo Astrakhan	Astrakhan	Sports Complex Star
HC Kaustik Volgograd	Volgograd	Molodezhnaya Sports Center
GK Permskie Medvedi	Perm	Sports Palace Krasava
UGNTU-VNZM Ufa	Ufa	Sports Complex Neftekhimik
Sungul Snezhinsk	Snezhinsk	UIC Sungul
UOR N°2 Moscow	Moscow	UOR n°2 Sports Center
Dynamo Chelyabinsk	Chelyabinsk	Sports Complex Flight

== Regular season ==
=== Standings ===
Pos	Team	Pld	W	D	L	GF	GA	GD	Pts	Qualification
1	Chekhovskiye Medvedi	22	20	1	1	747	598	+149	41	Play-offs
2	Universitet-Neva	22	17	1	4	657	559	+98	35	Play-offs
3	SKIF Krasnodar	22	15	1	6	677	610	+67	31	Play-offs
4	Dinamo Viktor Stavropol	22	12	3	7	608	572	+36	27	Play-offs
5	SSAU-Saratov	22	13	0	9	633	598	+35	26	Play-offs
6	Dinamo Astrakhan	22	11	3	8	623	633	−10	25	Play-offs
7	HC Kaustik Volgograd	22	7	6	9	608	612	−4	20	Play-offs
8	GK Permskie Medvedi	22	9	1	12	600	644	−44	19	Play-offs
9	UGNTU-VNZM	22	6	2	14	554	637	−83	14	Relegation Round
10	Sungul Snezhinsk	22	5	1	16	635	667	−32	11	Relegation Round
11	UOR N°2 Moscow	22	5	0	17	623	712	−89	10	Relegation Round
12	Dynamo Chelyabinsk	22	2	1	19	552	675	−123	5	Relegation Round

Source: Superleague

== Play-offs ==
Quarterfinals; 21–26 April
1	Chekhovskiye Medvedi	38	32
8	GK Permskie Medvedi	21	24
4	Dinamo Viktor Stavropol	35	30
5	SSAU-Saratov	27	25
2	Universitet-Neva	23	25	24
7	HC Kaustik Volgograd	25	22	18
3	SKIF Krasnodar	29	32
6	Dinamo Astrakhan	24	24

Semifinals; 12–17 May
1	Chekhovskiye Medvedi	31	29
4	Dinamo Viktor Stavropol	28	28
2	Universitet-Neva	23	26	25
3	SKIF Krasnodar	22	28	22

Finals; 22–27 May
1	Chekhovskiye Medvedi	27	33	28
2	Universitet-Neva	21	25	24
Third place
3	SKIF Krasnodar	27	29	28
4	Dinamo Viktor Stavropol	32	24	23

5-8th place semifinals 12,16 May
5	SSAU-Saratov	36	36
8	GK Permskie Medvedi	27	23
6	Dinamo Astrakhan	29	32
7	HC Kaustik Volgograd	24	23

5th place 22,26 May
5	SSAU-Saratov	27	32
6	Dinamo Astrakhan	29	34
7th place
7	HC Kaustik Volgograd	36	27
8	GK Permskie Medvedi	23	22

== Relegation group ==
Pos	Team	Pld	W	D	L	GF	GA	GD	BP	Pts
9	UGNTU-VNZM	12	7	0	5	342	319	+23	14	28
10	UOR N°2 Moscow	12	6	2	4	365	347	+18	10	24
11	Sungul Snezhinsk	12	4	3	5	356	361	−5	11	22
12	Dynamo Chelyabinsk	12	4	1	7	318	354	−36	5	14
