= Igor Chumak =

Russian handball player (born 1964)

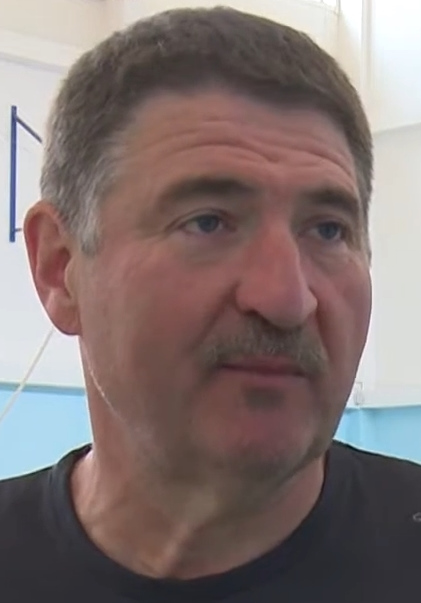
- Chumak in 2018

Personal information
- Full name: Igor Vladimirovich Chumak
- Nationality: Russian
- Born: 1 April 1964 (age 62) Vladivostok, Russia
- Height: 1.95 m (6 ft 5 in)

Sport
- Sport: Handball
- Position: Goalkeeper

Senior clubs
- Years: Team
- 1979-1980: Zarja Kaspija Astrakhan
- 1980-1990: SKIF Krasnodar
- 1990-1992: Dynamo Astrakhan
- 1992-1996: Montpellier HB
- 1996-1999: ES Besançon
- 1999-2000: Girondins de Bordeaux HBC
- 2000: ASCA Wittelsheim
- 2000-2001: Eintracht Hildesheim
- 2001-2003: Sélestat AHB
- 2003-2005: Perpignan Handball
- 2005-2006: TV Willstätt
- 2005-2006: Bergischer HC
- 2010-2011: TV Willstätt
- 2011: TuS Helmlingen
National team
Years	Team	Apps	(Gls)
-1992	Soviet Union	145	(0)
1992	Unified team	7	(0)
Medal record
Representing Soviet Union
Olympic Games
Gold medal – first place	1988 Seoul	Team
World Championships
Silver medal – second place	1990 Czechoslovakia	Team
Representing the Unified Team
Olympic Games
Gold medal – first place	1992 Barcelona	Team

Igor Vladimirovich Chumak (Russian: Игорь Владимирович Чумак; born 1 April 1964 in Vladivostok) is a Russian team handball player. He became Olympic champion in 1988 with the Soviet Union national handball team and in 1992 with the Unified Team.

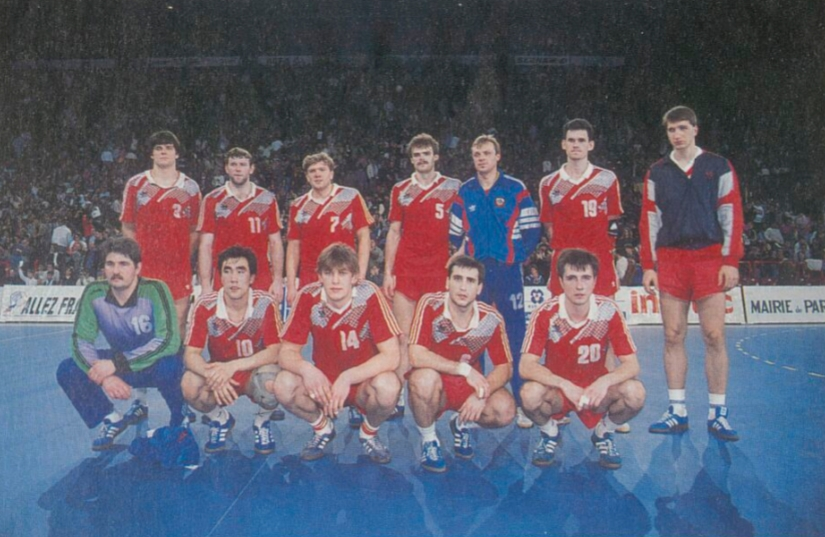
The CIS team in 1992

== Career ==
Chumak started his career in 1979 for Zarja Kaspija Astrakhan. After one season he joined SKIF Krasnodar, where he finished 3rd in the Soviet Men's Handball Championship in both 1988 and 1989.

In May 1990 he returned to Dynamo Astrakhan, where he won the 1990 Soviet Championship, and finished second in 1991. In the 1990-91 EHF Cup the team reached the semi final.

In 1992 after the dissolution of the Soviet Union he joined French team Montpellier HB. Here he won 1995 French Championship, which was the first in club history.

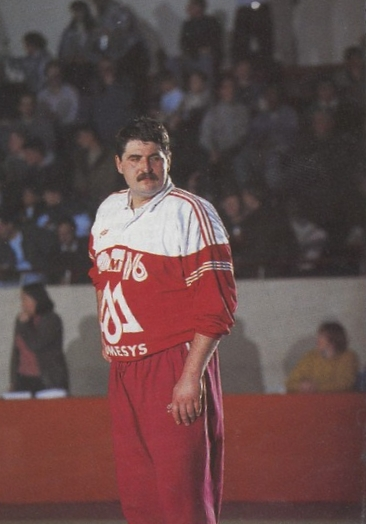
Igor Chumak in the Montpellier HB shirt (1995)

In 1996 he joined second tier ES Besançon. In 1999 he joined top division Girondins de Bordeaux HBC.

In the 2000-01 season he played for Bundesliga team Eintracht Hildesheim. After a year he returned to France and joined

After two years he joined third tier Perpignan Handball. His last club was 2nd Bundesliga TV Willstädt.

In the spring of 2007 he came out of retirement and joined 2nd Bundesliga Bergischer HC, replacing the injured Ivan Zoubkoff.

From October 2009 to the first half of the 2010-11 season he came out of retirement again to rejoin TV Willstädt. In the second half of the 2010-11 season he joined TuS Helmlingen.

== National team ==
Chumak won the 1983 and 1985 World Junior Championship.

With the Soviet Union he won Gold medals at the 1988 Olympics and silver at the 1990 World Championship.

At the 1992 Olympics he won gold medals with the Unified team

== Private ==
Chumak does also hold French citizenship.

== Titles ==
=== Club ===
- EHF Cup
  - Winner: 1990
- Soviet Men's Handball Championship
  - Winner: 1990
  - Second place: 1991
  - Third place: 1988, 1989. 1990
- Soviet Men's Handball Cup
  - Winner: 1987, 1988, 1989, 1990
- French Championship
  - Winner: 1995
