= Russian Men's Handball Super Cup =

- Founded: 2014; 12 years ago
- Country: Russia
- Confederation: EHF (Europe)
- Most recent champion: HBC CSKA Moscow (2024–25)
- Most titles: Chekhovskiye Medvedi (9 titles)
- 2025–26 season

The Russian Men's Handball Super Cup is a trophy that is played at the beginning of each season between the champion of Russia of the previous season and the winner of the Russian Cup of the previous season. If the champion and the Cup holder are the same team, then the Cup finalist plays with the champion. The trophy is held by the Russian Handball Federation and consists of one match. The trophy was played for the first time in 2014. Currently, the title sponsor of the tournament is the Olympus bookmaker, having replaced the VKontakte social network in 2018.

== Winners list ==
The champions of Russia of the previous season are highlighted in pale blue

Season	Champions	Runners-up	Score	Location
2014	Chekhovskiye Medvedi (1)	GK Permskie Medvedi	27:26 (13:14)	Chekhov
2015	Chekhovskiye Medvedi (2)	SKIF Krasnodar	31:25 (16:12)	Krasnodar
2016	Chekhovskiye Medvedi (3)	Saint Petersburg HC	34:22 (15:10)	Moscow
2017	Chekhovskiye Medvedi (4)	SKIF Krasnodar	33:24 (19:13)	Krasnodar
2018	Chekhovskiye Medvedi (5)	Spartak Moscow	22:21 (13:9)	Chekhov
2019	Chekhovskiye Medvedi (6)	Spartak Moscow	35:25 (17:12)	Moscow
2020	Chekhovskiye Medvedi (7)	HBC CSKA Moscow	27:24 (13:15)	Chekhov
2021	Chekhovskiye Medvedi (8)	SKIF Krasnodar	42:23 (18:9)	Chekhov
2022	Chekhovskiye Medvedi (9)	Dinamo Viktor Stavropol	27:24 (13:14)	Chekhov
2023	HBC CSKA Moscow (1)	Chekhovskiye Medvedi	31:26 (17:12)	Chekhov
2024	HBC CSKA Moscow (2)	Chekhovskiye Medvedi	35:32 (17:15)	Moscow
2025	HBC CSKA Moscow (3)	Saint Petersburg HC	35:27 (20:15)	Volgograd
