= Veszprém KC in European handball =

Veszprém KC is a Hungarian handball club, based in Veszprém, Hungary.

== European record ==
As of 6 May 2026:

| Competition | Seasons | Year(s) in the competition |
|---|---|---|
| EHF Champions League (Champions Cup) | 34x | 1982/83, 1986/87, 1987/88, 1993/94, 1994/95, 1995/96, 1997/98, 1998/99, 1999/00, 2001/02, 2002/03, 2003/04, 2004/05, 2005/06, 2006/07, 2007/08, 2008/09, 2009/10, 2010/11, 2011/12, 2012/13, 2013/14, 2014/15, 2015/16, 2016/17, 2017/18, 2018/19, 2019/20, 2020/21, 2021/22, 2022/23, 2023/24, 2024/25, 2025/26 |
| EHF Cup Winners' Cup (defunct) | 10x | 1984/85, 1985/86, 1988/89, 1989/90, 1990/91, 1991/92, 1992/93, 1996/97, 2000/01, 2007/08 |
| Source: kézitörténelem.hu | 44 seasons | |

== EHF-organised seasonal competitions ==
Veszprém score listed first. As of 6 May 2026.

=== European Cup and Champions League ===
| Season | Round | Club | Home | Away | Aggregate |
|---|---|---|---|---|---|
| 1982–83 | First round | (Turkey) İstanbul Bankası Yenişehir | 31-18 | 26-19 | 57–37 |
| 1982–83 | Round of 16 | (Soviet Union) CSKA Moscow | 25-30 | 19-31 | 44–61 |
| 1986–87 | First round | (Bulgaria) VIF Dimitrov Sofia | 25-13 | 13-21 | 38–34 |
| 1986–87 | Second round | (East Germany) SC Empor Rostock | 23-26 | 20-30 | 43–56 |
| 1987–88 | First round | (Israel) Maccabi Rishon LeZion | 32-24 | 23-27 | 55–51 |
| 1987–88 | Second round | (Soviet Union) CSKA Moscow | 22-22 | 14-24 | 46–56 |
| 1993–94 | First round | (Cyprus) Strovolou Nicosia | 33-17 | 37-18 | 70–35 |
| 1993–94 | Play-off round | (Spain) TEKA Santander | 29-26 | 16-25 | 45–51 |
| 1994–95 | First round | (Slovenia) Celje Pivovarna Laško | 22-18 | 24-21 | 46–39 |
| 1994–95 | Play-off round | (Switzerland) Pfadi Winterthur | 29-25 | 23-26 | 52–51 |
| 1994–95 | Group stage (Group A) | (Spain) Caja Cantabria Santander | 24-24 | 15-25 | 3rd |
| 1994–95 | Group stage (Group A) | (Croatia) Badel Zagreb | 23-23 | 18-30 | 3rd |
| 1994–95 | Group stage (Group A) | (Denmark) KIF Kolding | 25-20 | 26-25 | 3rd |
| 1995–96 | First round | (Luxembourg) HC Berchem | 31-20 | 36-13 | 67–33 |
| 1995–96 | Play-off round | (Italy) Principe Trieste | 21-16 | 23-22 | 44–38 |
| 1995–96 | Group stage (Group A) | (Spain) Elgorriaga Bidasoa | 28-29 | 23-19 | 3rd |
| 1995–96 | Group stage (Group A) | (Germany) THW Kiel | 23-21 | 25-28 | 3rd |
| 1995–96 | Group stage (Group A) | (Portugal) ABC Braga | 24-20 | 24-27 | 3rd |
| 1997–98 | Play-off round | (Russia) Kaustik Volgograd | 31-22 | 33-29 | 64–51 |
| 1997–98 | Group stage (Group D) | (Germany) TBV Lemgo | 24-24 | 26-29 | 2nd |
| 1997–98 | Group stage (Group D) | (North Macedonia) Jafa Promet Resen | 27-22 | 30-23 | 2nd |
| 1997–98 | Group stage (Group D) | (Czech Republic) CS Cabot Zubří | 31-22 | 30-24 | 2nd |
| 1997–98 | Quarter-finals | (Spain) FC Barcelona | 33-28 | 27-32 | 60–60 (a) |
| 1998–99 | Play-off round | (Finland) BK 46 Karis | 35-10 | 32-18 | 67–28 |
| 1998–99 | Group stage (Group A) | (Croatia) Badel 1862 Zagreb | 27-25 | 18-19 | 2nd |
| 1998–99 | Group stage (Group A) | (France) Montpellier HB | 26-17 | 17-21 | 2nd |
| 1998–99 | Group stage (Group A) | (Italy) H.C. Alpi Prato | 37-22 | 22-26 | 2nd |
| 1998–99 | Quarter-finals | (Spain) FC Barcelona | 29-29 | 24-29 | 53–58 |
| 1999–00 | Play-off round | (Finland) Grankulla IFK | 32-11 | 37-14 | 69–25 |
| 1999–00 | Group stage (Group D) | (Spain) FC Barcelona | 23-31 | 21-25 | 2nd |
| 1999–00 | Group stage (Group D) | (Russia) Kaustik Volgograd | 26-22 | 31-24 | 2nd |
| 1999–00 | Group stage (Group D) | (Federal Republic of Yugoslavia) Partizan Beograd | 24-17 | 25-28 | 2nd |
| 1999–00 | Quarter-finals | (Croatia) Badel 1862 Zagreb | 27-25 | 26-30 | 53–55 |
| 2001–02; Finalist | Group stage (Group D) | (Germany) Sportclub Magdeburg | 24-20 | 22-25 | 1st |
| 2001–02; Finalist | Group stage (Group D) | (France) S.O. Chambéry | 29-13 | 28-26 | 1st |
| 2001–02; Finalist | Group stage (Group D) | (North Macedonia) Vardar Vatrost. Skopje | 27-22 | 27-24 | 1st |
| 2001–02; Finalist | Quarter-finals | (Spain) C.BM. Ademar León | 30-18 | 27-22 | 57–40 |
| 2001–02; Finalist | Semi-finals | (Spain) Portland San Antonio | 27-19 | 21-27 | 48–46 |
| 2001–02; Finalist | Finals | (Germany) Sportclub Magdeburg | 23-21 | 25-30 | 48–51 |
| 2002–03 | Group stage (Group A) | (Germany) Sportclub Magdeburg | 31-22 | 28-27 | 1st |
| 2002–03 | Group stage (Group A) | (Poland) Wisła Płock SSA | 38-24 | 30-25 | 1st |
| 2002–03 | Group stage (Group A) | (Greece) Panellinios A.C. | 19-13 | 17-16 | 1st |
| 2002–03 | Quarter-finals | (Denmark) Kolding IF | 36-26 | 27-31 | 63–57 |
| 2002–03 | Semi-finals | (Spain) Portland San Antonio | 30-26 | 20-28 | 50–54 |
| 2003–04 | Group stage (Group G) | (Poland) KS Vive Kielce | 31-24 | 41-30 | 1st |
| 2003–04 | Group stage (Group G) | (Denmark) Skjern Håndbold | 33-29 | 26-23 | 1st |
| 2003–04 | Group stage (Group G) | (Bosnia and Herzegovina) RK Bosna Sarajevo | 31-26 | 35-24 | 1st |
| 2003–04 | Round of 16 | (Spain) FC Barcelona | 31-26 | 29-33 | 60–59 |
| 2003–04 | Quarter-finals | (Spain) B.M. Ciudad Real | 25-28 | 24-33 | 49–61 |
| 2004–05 | Group stage (Group G) | (Norway) Sandefjord TIF | 36-24 | 31-25 | 1st |
| 2004–05 | Group stage (Group G) | (Germany) TBV Lemgo | 29-23 | 28-23 | 1st |
| 2004–05 | Group stage (Group G) | (Lithuania) HC Granitas Kaunas | 38-17 | 33-26 | 1st |
| 2004–05 | Round of 16 | (Ukraine) HC ZTR Zaporizhzhia | 39-29 | 28-29 | 67–58 |
| 2004–05 | Quarter-finals | (Spain) B.M. Ciudad Real | 22-29 | 33-34 | 55–63 |
| 2005–06 | Group stage (Group F) | (Spain) BM Ciudad Real | 31-29 | 23-34 | 2nd |
| 2005–06 | Group stage (Group F) | (Slovakia) Tatran Prešov | 42-23 | 35-23 | 2nd |
| 2005–06 | Group stage (Group F) | (Romania) Dinamo Baumit Bucureșt | 37-27 | 38-27 | 2nd |
| 2005–06 | Round of 16 | (Denmark) Arhus GF | 30-21 | 31-28 | 61–49 |
| 2005–06 | Quarter-finals | (France) Montpellier HB | 27-22 | 21-23 | 48–45 |
| 2005–06 | Semi-finals | (Spain) Portland San Antonio | 29-27 | 29-32 | 58–59 |
| 2006–07 | Group stage (Group A) | (Spain) Portland San Antonio | 23-21 | 27-34 | 2nd |
| 2006–07 | Group stage (Group A) | (Slovakia) MŠK SIRS Považská Bystrica | 46-26 | 46-30 | 2nd |
| 2006–07 | Group stage (Group A) | (Bosnia and Herzegovina) RK Bosna Sarajevo | 34-24 | 31-25 | 2nd |
| 2006–07 | Round of 16 | (Denmark) KIF Kolding Elite A/S | 32-22 | 28-31 | 60–53 |
| 2006–07 | Quarter-finals | (Germany) THW Kiel | 39-36 | 32-39 | 71–75 |
| 2007–08 | Group stage (Group F) | (Slovenia) Celje Pivovarna Laško | 24-24 | 23-28 | 3rd CWC |
| 2007–08 | Group stage (Group F) | (Germany) VfL Gummersbach | 35-35 | 30-32 | 3rd CWC |
| 2007–08 | Group stage (Group F) | (Iceland) Valur | 41-28 | 31-24 | 3rd CWC |
| 2008–09 | Group stage (Group F) | (Germany) SG Flensburg-Handewitt | 29-28 | 29-32 | 2nd |
| 2008–09 | Group stage (Group F) | (Ukraine) HC ZTR Zaporizhzhia | 33-22 | 32-25 | 2nd |
| 2008–09 | Group stage (Group F) | (Iceland) Haukar | 34-25 | 26-27 | 2nd |
| 2008–09 | Main round (Group 3) | (Germany) SG Flensburg-Handewitt | 29-28 | 29-32 | 1st |
| 2008–09 | Main round (Group 3) | (Spain) Reale Ademar | 28-26 | 32-30 | 1st |
| 2008–09 | Main round (Group 3) | (France) Montpellier HB | 30-24 | 22-23 | 1st |
| 2008–09 | Quarter-finals | (Spain) BM Ciudad Real | 32-29 | 24-29 | 56–58 |
| 2009–10 | Group stage (Group B) | (Slovenia) RK Gorenje | 30-25 | 28-27 | 1st |
| 2009–10 | Group stage (Group B) | (France) Chambéry Savoie HB | 31-26 | 29-19 | 1st |
| 2009–10 | Group stage (Group B) | (Germany) Rhein-Neckar Löwen | 34-30 | 29-32 | 1st |
| 2009–10 | Group stage (Group B) | (Bosnia and Herzegovina) RK Bosna BH Gas | 35-18 | 24-20 | 1st |
| 2009–10 | Group stage (Group B) | (Poland) KS Vive Targi Kielce | 33-26 | 32-29 | 1st |
| 2009–10 | Round of 16 | (Romania) HCM Constanța | 27-26 | 27-23 | 54–49 |
| 2009–10 | Quarter-finals | (Spain) F.C. Barcelona Borges | 33-34 | 27-33 | 60–67 |
| 2010–11 | Group stage (Group B) | (France) Montpellier Agglomération HB | 27-26 | 24-30 | 2nd |
| 2010–11 | Group stage (Group B) | (Germany) HSV Hamburg | 33-30 | 26-27 | 2nd |
| 2010–11 | Group stage (Group B) | (Denmark) KIF Kolding | 31-28 | 34-29 | 2nd |
| 2010–11 | Group stage (Group B) | (Sweden) IK Sävehof | 38-34 | 41-31 | 2nd |
| 2010–11 | Group stage (Group B) | (Slovakia) Tatran Prešov | 33-22 | 35-27 | 2nd |
| 2010–11 | Round of 16 | (Spain) F.C. Barcelona Borges | 30-26 | 21-28 | 51–54 |
| 2011–12 | Group stage (Group B) | (Russia) Chekhovskiye Medvedi | 24-22 | 26-30 | 2nd |
| 2011–12 | Group stage (Group B) | (Spain) BM Atlético Madrid | 28-27 | 28-37 | 2nd |
| 2011–12 | Group stage (Group B) | (Germany) Füchse Berlin | 24-33 | 29-24 | 2nd |
| 2011–12 | Group stage (Group B) | (Denmark) Bjerringbro-Silkeborg | 32-25 | 25-19 | 2nd |
| 2011–12 | Group stage (Group B) | (Poland) KS Vive Targi Kielce | 21-24 | 29-25 | 2nd |
| 2011–12 | Round of 16 | (Spain) Reale Ademar León | 27-25 | 28-31 | 55–56 |
| 2012–13 | Group stage (Group B) | (Germany) THW Kiel | 31-30 | 21-32 | 1st |
| 2012–13 | Group stage (Group B) | (Spain) BM Atlético Madrid | 26-19 | 27-26 | 1st |
| 2012–13 | Group stage (Group B) | (Sweden) IK Sävehof | 34-24 | 32-22 | 1st |
| 2012–13 | Group stage (Group B) | (Slovenia) Celje Pivovarna Laško | 32-22 | 24-19 | 1st |
| 2012–13 | Group stage (Group B) | (Romania) HCM Constanța | 31-21 | 37-27 | 1st |
| 2012–13 | Round of 16 | (Spain) Reale Ademar León | 33-25 | 23-20 | 56–45 |
| 2012–13 | Quarter-finals | (Germany) THW Kiel | 28-29 | 31-32 | 59–61 |
| 2013–14; Fourth place | Group stage (Group A) | RK Croatia Osiguranje Zagreb | 34-27 | 33-22 | 1st |
| 2013–14; Fourth place | Group stage (Group A) | (Russia) St. Petersburg HC | 29-20 | 28-15 | 1st |
| 2013–14; Fourth place | Group stage (Group A) | (Germany) Rhein-Neckar Löwen | 30-29 | 25-25 | 1st |
| 2013–14; Fourth place | Group stage (Group A) | (Slovenia) Celje Pivovarna Laško | 27-26 | 31-26 | 1st |
| 2013–14; Fourth place | Group stage (Group A) | (Ukraine) HC Motor Zaporizhzhia | 44-27 | 22-26 | 1st |
| 2013–14; Fourth place | Round of 16 | (Poland) Orlen Wisła Płock | 31-26 | 33-34 | 64–60 |
| 2013–14; Fourth place | Quarter-finals | (France) Paris Saint-Germain Handball | 31-26 | 28-26 | 59–52 |
| 2013–14; Fourth place | Semi-final (F4) | (Germany) THW Kiel | 26–29 | | |
| 2013–14; Fourth place | Bronze match (F4) | (Spain) FC Barcelona | 25–26 | | |
| 2014–15; Finalist | Group stage (Group C) | (Slovenia) RK Celje Pivovarna Laško | 29-26 | 24-21 | 1st |
| 2014–15; Finalist | Group stage (Group C) | (Russia) Chekhovskiye Medvedi | 38-31 | 37-32 | 1st |
| 2014–15; Finalist | Group stage (Group C) | (Germany) Rhein-Neckar Löwen | 27-24 | 25-32 | 1st |
| 2014–15; Finalist | Group stage (Group C) | (North Macedonia) RK Vardar | 32-24 | 24-23 | 1st |
| 2014–15; Finalist | Group stage (Group C) | (France) Montpellier Agglomération HB | 30-29 | 34-20 | 1st |
| 2014–15; Finalist | Round of 16 | (Spain) Naturhouse La Rioja | 37-31 | 31-23 | 68–54 |
| 2014–15; Finalist | Quarter-finals | (France) Paris Saint-Germain Handball | 34-28 | 24-24 | 58–52 |
| 2014–15; Finalist | Semi-final (F4) | (Germany) THW Kiel | 31–27 | | |
| 2014–15; Finalist | Final (F4) | (Spain) FC Barcelona | 23–28 | | |
| 2015–16; Finalist | Group Phase (Group A) | (Germany) THW Kiel | 29-27 | 24-25 | 2nd |
| 2015–16; Finalist | Group Phase (Group A) | (France) Paris Saint-Germain Handball | 28-20 | 27-29 | 2nd |
| 2015–16; Finalist | Group Phase (Group A) | (Slovenia) RK Celje Pivovarna Laško | 34-28 | 30-27 | 2nd |
| 2015–16; Finalist | Group Phase (Group A) | (Poland) Orlen Wisła Płock | 27-25 | 27-27 | 2nd |
| 2015–16; Finalist | Group Phase (Group A) | (Croatia) RK Prvo plinarsko društvo Zagreb | 27-25 | 21-20 | 2nd |
| 2015–16; Finalist | Group Phase (Group A) | (Turkey) Beşiktaş J.K. | 33-25 | 38-34 | 2nd |
| 2015–16; Finalist | Group Phase (Group A) | (Germany) SG Flensburg-Handewitt | 28-24 | 29-28 | 2nd |
| 2015–16; Finalist | Round of 16 | (Ukraine) HC Motor Zaporizhzhia | 41-28 | 29-24 | 70–52 |
| 2015–16; Finalist | Quarter-finals | (North Macedonia) RK Vardar | 30-30 | 29-26 | 59–56 |
| 2015–16; Finalist | Semi-final (F4) | (Germany) THW Kiel | 31–28 (a.e.t.) | | |
| 2015–16; Finalist | Final (F4) | (Poland) KS Vive Tauron Kielce | 35–35 (3-4 p) | | |
| 2016–17; Third place | Group stage (Group A) | (Spain) FC Barcelona Lassa | 22-25 | 23-26 | 3rd |
| 2016–17; Third place | Group stage (Group A) | (France) Paris Saint-Germain Handball | 28-29 | 24-28 | 3rd |
| 2016–17; Third place | Group stage (Group A) | (Denmark) Bjerringbro-Silkeborg | 30-29 | 29-24 | 3rd |
| 2016–17; Third place | Group stage (Group A) | (Poland) Orlen Wisła Płock | 31-25 | 28-28 | 3rd |
| 2016–17; Third place | Group stage (Group A) | (Germany) SG Flensburg-Handewitt | 34-28 | 24-24 | 3rd |
| 2016–17; Third place | Group stage (Group A) | (Switzerland) Kadetten Schaffhausen | 32-28 | 28-27 | 3rd |
| 2016–17; Third place | Group stage (Group A) | (Germany) THW Kiel | 21-19 | 27-25 | 3rd |
| 2016–17; Third place | Round of 16 | (Croatia) RK Prvo plinarsko društvo Zagreb | 29-19 | 23-22 | 52–41 |
| 2016–17; Third place | Quarter-finals | (France) Montpellier HB | 26-23 | 30-25 | 56–48 |
| 2016–17; Third place | Semi-final (F4) | (France) Paris Saint-Germain Handball | 26–27 | | |
| 2016–17; Third place | Bronze match (F4) | (Spain) FC Barcelona Lassa | 34–30 | | |
| 2017–18 | Group stage (Group B) | (Poland) PGE Vive Kielce | 31-26 | 32-32 | 2nd |
| 2017–18 | Group stage (Group B) | (France) Paris Saint-Germain Handball | 28-33 | 24-29 | 2nd |
| 2017–18 | Group stage (Group B) | (Denmark) Aalborg Håndbold | 30-24 | 26-29 | 2nd |
| 2017–18 | Group stage (Group B) | (Belarus) HC Meshkov Brest | 34-22 | 29-26 | 2nd |
| 2017–18 | Group stage (Group B) | (Slovenia) RK Celje Pivovarna Laško | 29-22 | 39-31 | 2nd |
| 2017–18 | Group stage (Group B) | (Germany) SG Flensburg-Handewitt | 28-27 | 31-31 | 2nd |
| 2017–18 | Group stage (Group B) | (Germany) THW Kiel | 26-24 | 20-22 | 2nd |
| 2017–18 | Round of 16 | (Denmark) Skjern Håndbold | 34-29 | 25-32 | 59–61 |
| 2018–19; Finalist | Group stage (Group A) | (North Macedonia) RK Vardar | 25-27 | 29-27 | 2nd |
| 2018–19; Finalist | Group stage (Group A) | (Poland) PGE Vive Kielce | 29-27 | 36-35 | 2nd |
| 2018–19; Finalist | Group stage (Group A) | (Spain) FC Barcelona Lassa | 29-26 | 28-31 | 2nd |
| 2018–19; Finalist | Group stage (Group A) | (Belarus) HC Meshkov Brest | 28-20 | 29-28 | 2nd |
| 2018–19; Finalist | Group stage (Group A) | (France) Montpellier HB | 25-19 | 30-29 | 2nd |
| 2018–19; Finalist | Group stage (Group A) | (Sweden) IFK Kristianstad | 36-27 | 29-32 | 2nd |
| 2018–19; Finalist | Group stage (Group A) | (Germany) Rhein-Neckar Löwen | 28-29 | 29-25 | 2nd |
| 2018–19; Finalist | Round of 16 | (Portugal) Sporting CP | 35-29 | 30-28 | 65–57 |
| 2018–19; Finalist | Quarter-finals | (Germany) SG Flensburg-Handewitt | 29-25 | 28-22 | 57–47 |
| 2018–19; Finalist | Semi-final (F4) | (Poland) PGE Vive Kielce | 33–30 | | |
| 2018–19; Finalist | Final (F4) | (North Macedonia) RK Vardar | 24–27 | | |
| 2019–20; Fourth place | Group stage (Group B) | (North Macedonia) RK Vardar | 39-30 | 38-29 | 2nd |
| 2019–20; Fourth place | Group stage (Group B) | (Poland) PGE Vive Kielce | 28-24 | 33-34 | 2nd |
| 2019–20; Fourth place | Group stage (Group B) | (Belarus) HC Meshkov Brest | 31-25 | 37-30 | 2nd |
| 2019–20; Fourth place | Group stage (Group B) | (Ukraine) HC Motor Zaporizhzhia | 40-28 | 32-22 | 2nd |
| 2019–20; Fourth place | Group stage (Group B) | (France) Montpellier HB | 24-23 | 18-23 | 2nd |
| 2019–20; Fourth place | Group stage (Group B) | (Portugal) FC Porto Sofarma | 38-28 | 24-31 | 2nd |
| 2019–20; Fourth place | Group stage (Group B) | (Germany) THW Kiel | 31-37 | 28-29 | 2nd |
| 2019–20; Fourth place | Semi-final (F4) | (Germany) THW Kiel | 35–36 | | |
| 2019–20; Fourth place | Bronze match (F4) | (France) Paris Saint-Germain | 26–31 | | |
| 2020–21 | Group stage (Group B) | (France) HBC Nantes | 5-5 | 28-24 | 2nd |
| 2020–21 | Group stage (Group B) | (Croatia) PPD Zagreb | 37-25 | 35-28 | 2nd |
| 2020–21 | Group stage (Group B) | (Ukraine) HC Motor Zaporizhzhia | 34-30 | 37-34 | 2nd |
| 2020–21 | Group stage (Group B) | (Slovenia) Celje Pivovarna Laško | 39-24 | 29-25 | 2nd |
| 2020–21 | Group stage (Group B) | (Germany) THW Kiel | 41-33 | 31-31 | 2nd |
| 2020–21 | Group stage (Group B) | (Denmark) Aalborg Håndbold | 30-32 | 33-27 | 2nd |
| 2020–21 | Group stage (Group B) | (Spain) Barça | 34-37 | 30-37 | 2nd |
| 2020–21 | Play-offs | (North Macedonia) RK Vardar | 39-30 | 41-27 | 80–57 |
| 2020–21 | Quarterfinals | (France) HBC Nantes | 32-30 | 28-32 | 60–62 |
| 2021–22; Fourth place | Group stage (Group B) | (France) Paris Saint-Germain | 34-31 | 40-39 | 4th |
| 2021–22; Fourth place | Group stage (Group B) | (Poland) Łomża Vive Kielce | 35-33 | 29-32 | 4th |
| 2021–22; Fourth place | Group stage (Group B) | (Spain) Barça | 29-28 | 30-35 | 4th |
| 2021–22; Fourth place | Group stage (Group B) | (Portugal) FC Porto | 28-28 | 30-23 | 4th |
| 2021–22; Fourth place | Group stage (Group B) | (Germany) SG Flensburg-Handewitt | 28-23 | 27-30 | 4th |
| 2021–22; Fourth place | Group stage (Group B) | (Romania) Dinamo București | 47-32 | 29-31 | 4th |
| 2021–22; Fourth place | Group stage (Group B) | (Ukraine) HC Motor Zaporizhzhia | 36-29 | 27-29 | 4th |
| 2021–22; Fourth place | Playoffs | (North Macedonia) RK Vardar | 31-31 | 30-22 | 61–53 |
| 2021–22; Fourth place | Quarterfinals | (Denmark) Aalborg Håndbold | 36-29 | 35-37 | 71–66 |
| 2021–22; Fourth place | Semi-final (F4) | (Poland) Łomża Vive Kielce | 35–37 | | |
| 2021–22; Fourth place | Bronze match (F4) | (Germany) THW Kiel | 34–34 (1-3 p) | | |
| 2022–23 | Group stage (Group A) | (France) Paris Saint-Germain | 36-34 | 35-27 | 3rd |
| 2022–23 | Group stage (Group A) | (Portugal) FC Porto | 32-30 | 35-28 | 3rd |
| 2022–23 | Group stage (Group A) | (Romania) Dinamo București | 33-30 | 31-31 | 3rd |
| 2022–23 | Group stage (Group A) | (Denmark) GOG Håndbold | 36-37 | 31-30 | 3rd |
| 2022–23 | Group stage (Group A) | (Germany) SC Magdeburg | 35-35 | 25-32 | 3rd |
| 2022–23 | Group stage (Group A) | (Poland) Orlen Wisła Płock | 32-22 | 30-26 | 3rd |
| 2022–23 | Group stage (Group A) | (Croatia) PPD Zagreb | 32-28 | 26-29 | 3rd |
| 2022–23 | Playoffs | (Hungary) OTP Bank - Pick Szeged | 38-33 | 36-23 | 74–56 |
| 2022–23 | Quarterfinals | (Poland) Barlinek Industria Kielce | 29-29 | 27-31 | 56–60 |
| 2023–24 | Group stage (Group B) | (Germany) SC Magdeburg | 28-30 | 33-28 | 3rd |
| 2023–24 | Group stage (Group B) | (France) Montpellier Handball | 33-31 | 37-31 | 3rd |
| 2023–24 | Group stage (Group B) | (Denmark) GOG Håndbold | 34-31 | 30-36 | 3rd |
| 2023–24 | Group stage (Group B) | (Portugal) FC Porto | 44-34 | 40-26 | 3rd |
| 2023–24 | Group stage (Group B) | (Poland) Orlen Wisła Płock | 28-21 | 30-37 | 3rd |
| 2023–24 | Group stage (Group B) | (Spain) Barça | 30-31 | 41-36 | 3rd |
| 2023–24 | Group stage (Group B) | (Slovenia) Celje Pivovarna Laško | 41-31 | 40-33 | 3rd |
| 2023–24 | Playoffs | (Hungary) OTP Bank - Pick Szeged | 39-32 | 37-30 | 76–62 |
| 2023–24 | Quarterfinals | (Denmark) Aalborg Håndbold | 32-31 | 28-33 | 60–64 |
| 2024–25 | Group stage (Group A) | (Germany) Füchse Berlin | 32-33 | 32-31 | 1st |
| 2024–25 | Group stage (Group A) | (France) Paris Saint-Germain | 41-28 | 37-33 | 1st |
| 2024–25 | Group stage (Group A) | (Portugal) Sporting CP | 33-32 | 30-39 | 1st |
| 2024–25 | Group stage (Group A) | (Romania) CS Dinamo București | 36-24 | 33-26 | 1st |
| 2024–25 | Group stage (Group A) | (Denmark) Fredericia HK | 34-32 | 40-31 | 1st |
| 2024–25 | Group stage (Group A) | (North Macedonia) RK Eurofarm Pelister | 33-26 | 30-23 | 1st |
| 2024–25 | Group stage (Group A) | (Poland) Orlen Wisła Płock | 30-26 | 27-24 | 1st |
| 2024–25 | Quarterfinals | (Germany) SC Magdeburg | 27-28 | 26-26 | 53–54 |
| 2025–26 | Group stage (Group A) | (Denmark) Aalborg Håndbold | 33-38 | 28-32 | 3rd |
| 2025–26 | Group stage (Group A) | (France) HBC Nantes | 30-25 | 31-33 | 3rd |
| 2025–26 | Group stage (Group A) | (Romania) CS Dinamo București | 35-28 | 30-27 | 3rd |
| 2025–26 | Group stage (Group A) | (Poland) Industria Kielce | 35-33 | 35-36 | 3rd |
| 2025–26 | Group stage (Group A) | (Portugal) Sporting CP | 32-31 | 32-33 | 3rd |
| 2025–26 | Group stage (Group A) | (Germany) Füchse Berlin | 31-32 | 34-38 | 3rd |
| 2025–26 | Group stage (Group A) | (Norway) Kolstad Håndball | 42-34 | 43-29 | 3rd |
| 2025–26 | Playoffs | (France) Paris Saint-Germain | 32-24 | 35-35 | 67–59 |
| 2025–26 | Quarterfinals | (Germany) Füchse Berlin | 35-34 | 30-31 | 65–65 (3-4 p) |

=== Cup Winners' Cup ===
From the 2012–13 season, the men's competition was merged with the EHF Cup.

| Season | Round | Club | Home | Away | Aggregate |
|---|---|---|---|---|---|
| 1984–85 | Round of 16 | (East Germany) SC Dynamo Berlin | 18-23 | 20-21 | 38–44 |
| 1985–86 | First round | (Turkey) Arcelik SC | 33-23 | 29-24 | 62–47 |
| 1985–86 | Round of 16 | (Norway) Ski HK | 31-21 | 22-22 | 53–43 |
| 1985–86 | Quarter-finals | (Spain) TEKA Santander | 29-20 | 16-19 | 45–39 |
| 1985–86 | Semi-finals | (Spain) FC Barcelona | 27-25 | 19-29 | 46–54 |
| 1988–89 | First round | (Italy) SSV Brixen | 26-23 | 15-14 | 41–37 |
| 1988–89 | Round of 16 | (Switzerland) Pfadi Winterthur | 34-21 | 24-14 | 58–35 |
| 1988–89 | Quarter-finals | (West Germany) TUSEM Essen | 23-20 | 15-23 | 38–43 |
| 1989–90 | First round | (Czechoslovakia) CH Bratislava | 23-18 | 20-24 | 43–42 |
| 1989–90 | Round of 16 | (Denmark) Virum-Sorgenfri HK | 29-20 | 20-23 | 49–43 |
| 1989–90 | Quarter-finals | (Romania) Minaur Baia Mare | 19-18 | 25-22 | 44–40 |
| 1989–90 | Semi-finals | (Spain) TEKA Santander | 24-29 | 21-25 | 45–54 |
| 1990–91 | Round of 16 | (Soviet Union) SKA Minsk | 27-18 | 27-28 | 54–46 |
| 1990–91 | Quarter-finals | (Austria) UHC Vogel-Pumpen Stockerau | 36-26 | 26-27 | 62–53 |
| 1990–91 | Semi-finals | (Germany) TSV Milbertshofen | 20-15 | 15-23 | 35–38 |
| 1991–92; Winner | Round of 16 | (Spain) Elgorriaga Bidasoa | 17-19 | 26-18 | 43–37 |
| 1991–92; Winner | Quarter-finals | (Switzerland) RTV Basel | 31-20 | 26-19 | 57–39 |
| 1991–92; Winner | Semi-finals | (Denmark) GOG Gudme | 24-19 | 26-21 | 50–40 |
| 1991–92; Winner | Finals | (Germany) TSV Milbertshofen | 24-14 | 27-20 | 51–34 |
| 1992–93; Finalist | Round of 16 | (Denmark) KIF Kolding | 30-27 | 28-20 | 58–47 |
| 1992–93; Finalist | Quarter-finals | (Latvia) Bauskas HC | 31-27 | 22-22 | 53–49 |
| 1992–93; Finalist | Semi-finals | (Germany) TuSEM Essen | 29-18 | 23-22 | 52–40 |
| 1992–93; Finalist | Finals | (France) OM Vitrolles | 22-23 | 21-23 | 43–46 |
| 1996–97; Finalist | Round of 32 | (Greece) GAS Archelaos Katerinis | 28-22 | 30-19 | 58–41 |
| 1996–97; Finalist | Round of 16 | (Norway) Viking HK | 32-20 | 24-33 | 56–53 |
| 1996–97; Finalist | Quarter-finals | (Iceland) KA Akureyri | 34-22 | 31-32 | 65–54 |
| 1996–97; Finalist | Semi-finals | (France) US d'Ivry Handball | 29-21 | 31-29 | 60–50 |
| 1996–97; Finalist | Finals | (Spain) Elgorriaga Bidasoa | 19-17 | 19-24 | 38–41 |
| 2000–01 | Third round | (Lithuania) Šiaulių universitetas | 37-18 | 38-18 | 75–36 |
| 2000–01 | Fourth round | (Austria) Jet2Web Bregenz HB | 30-24 | 27-17 | 57–41 |
| 2000–01 | Quarter-finals | (Germany) SG Flensburg-Handewitt | 20-22 | 22-31 | 42–53 |
| 2007–08; Winner | Round of 16 | (Romania) C.S.A. Steaua MFA București | 31-23 | 34-26 | 65–49 |
| 2007–08; Winner | Quarter-finals | (Denmark) KIF Kolding Elite A/S | 31-27 | 31-29 | 63–66 |
| 2007–08; Winner | Semi-finals | (Switzerland) Kadetten Schaffhausen GCZ | 30-24 | 28-28 | 58–52 |
| 2007–08; Winner | Finals | (Germany) Rhein-Neckar Löwen | 37-32 | 28-28 | 65–60 |

=== Champions Trophy ===
| Season | Round | Club | Result |
|---|---|---|---|
| 2002; Finalist | Semi-final | (Germany) THW Kiel (EHF Cup) | 31–23 |
| 2002; Finalist | Final | (Germany) Sportclub Magdeburg (Champions League I.) | 30–31 |
| 2008; Finalist | Semi-final | (Germany) HSG Nordhorn (EHF Cup) | 39–30 |
| 2008; Finalist | Final | (Spain) BM Ciudad Real (Champions League I.) | 28–27 |
