= Lev Voronin (handballer) =

Russian handball coach and player

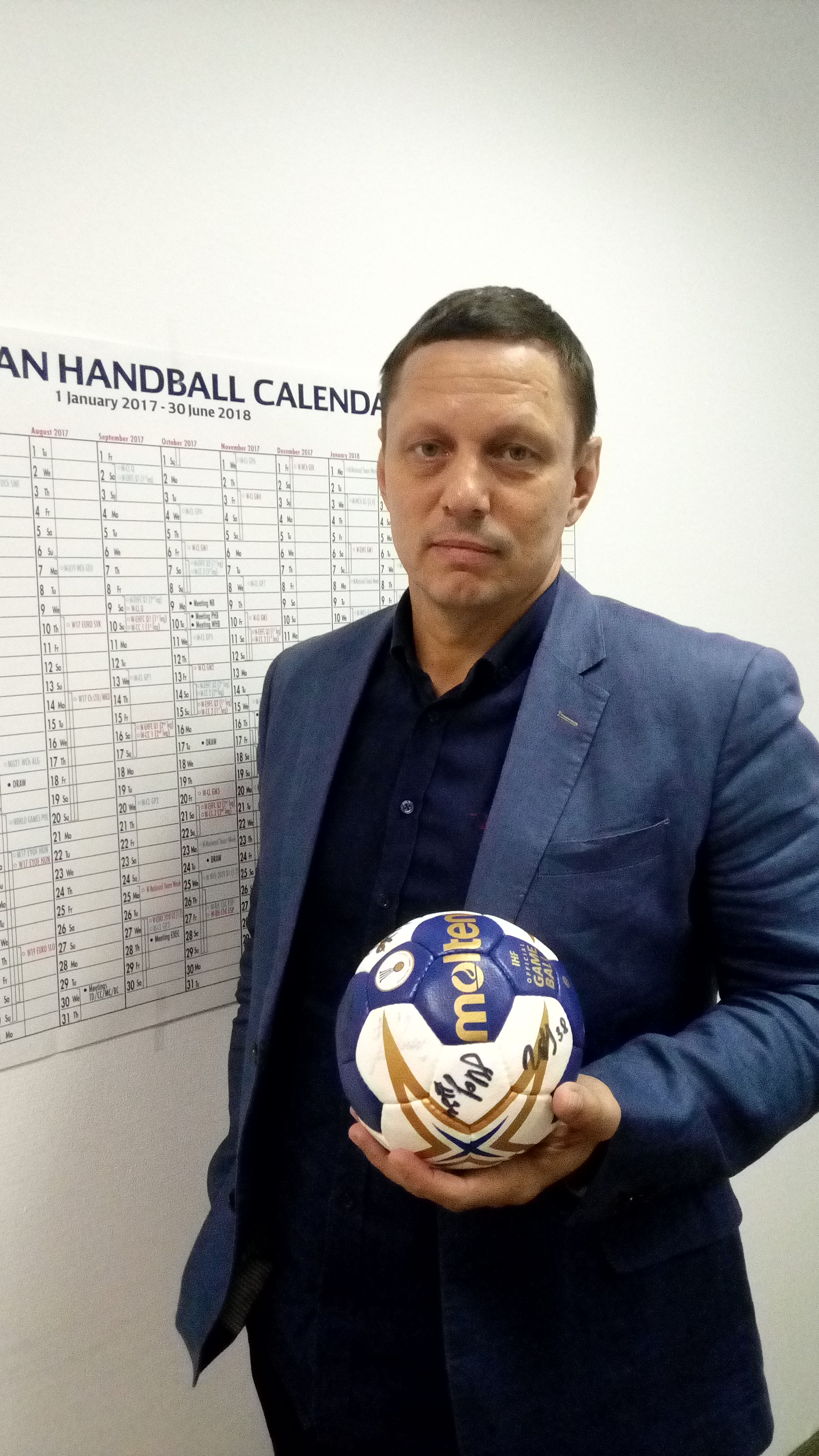
- Voronin in 2017

Personal information
- Nationality: Russian
- Born: 8 June 1971 (age 55) Astrachan, Russia
- Height: 185 cm (73 in)

Sport
- Sport: Handball
- Position: Right wing

Senior clubs
- Years: Team
- -1998: Dinamo Astrakhan
- 1998-2008: TSG Friesenheim
- 2008-2009: Dynamo Astrakhan (Player-coach)
National team
Years	Team	Apps
1995-2000	Russia	114

Teams managed
- 2008-2010: Dynamo Astrakhan
- 2010-2016: GK Permskie Medvedi
- 2015-2017: Russia (assistant)
- 2024-: Russia
Medal record
Representing Russia
Men's Handball
Olympic Games
Gold medal – first place	2000 Sydney	Team
World Championships
Gold medal – first place	1997 Japan	Team
Silver medal – second place	1999 Egypt	Team
European Championships
Gold medal – first place	1996 Spain	Team
Silver medal – second place	2000 Croatia	Team

Lev Gennadiyevich Voronin (Russian: Лев Геннадиевич Воронин, born 8 June 1971) is a Russian team handball coach and former player and Olympic champion from 2000 in Sydney.

He competed for Russia at the 1996 Summer Olympics, where the Russian team placed fifth. He was part of the Russian team that won gold medals at the 2000 Summer Olympics.

== Career ==
Voronin started his career at his hometown club Dynamo Astrakhan. Here he came second in the 1989 Soviet Men's Handball Championship and won it in 1990. In 1991 he once again came in second.

In 1998 he joined German side TSG Friesenheim in the 2nd Bundesliga.

After 10 years in Germany he returned to Dynamo Astrakhan as the player-coach. In 2009 he retired from playing and became the coach full time.

In 2010 he became the head coach at GK Permskie Medvedi. Here he won the 2014 Russian Cup.

From February 2015 to 2017 he was the assistant coach at the Russia men's national handball team under Dmitri Torgovanov.

From June 2024 he became the head coach of the Russian national team. However due to the Russian invasion of Ukraine he can not actually coach Russia in any important matches.

== National team ==
Voronin was part of the Russian 1990's golden generation that won the 1996 European Men's Handball Championship, the 1997 World Men's Handball Championship and gold medals at the 2000 Olympics.

In total he played 114 matches for Russia.
