= Aleksandr Rymanov =

Soviet handball player

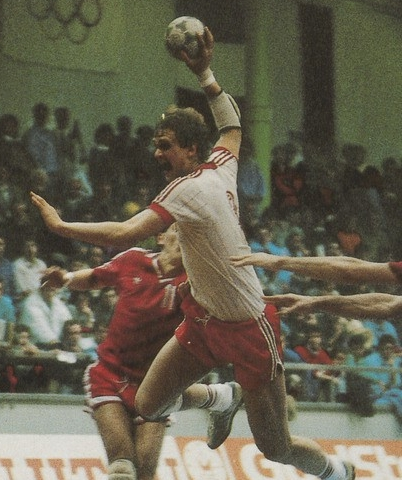
- Rymanov in 1987

Personal information
- Full name: Aleksandr Anatolevich Rymanov
- Nationality: Russian
- Born: 25 August 1959 (age 67) Moscow, Russia
- Height: 197 cm (78 in)

Sport
- Sport: Handball
- Position: Pivot
- Current club: Retired

Senior clubs
- Years: Team
- –1989: CSKA Moscow
- 1989–1994: OSC Rheinhausen
National team
Years	Team	Apps	(Gls)
–	Soviet Union	206	(?)

Teams managed
- 1994–1995: OSC Rheinhausen (assistant)
- 1995–1998: OSC Rheinhausen
- 1998–1999: TUSEM Essen
- 1999–2003: GWD Minden
- 2003–2006: TSG Friesenheim
- 2007–2008: GWD Minden
- 2012–2015: Russia men (assistant)
Medal record
Representing Soviet Union
Olympic Games
Gold medal – first place	1988 Seoul	Team
World Championships
Gold medal – first place	1982 West Germany	Team

Aleksandr Anatolevich Rymanov (Russian: Александр Анатольевич Рыманов, born August 25, 1959) is a former Soviet/Russian handball player, who won both Olympic and World Cup gold medals.

At the 1982 World Men's Handball Championship he won gold medals. In 1988 he won the Olympic gold medal with the Soviet team. He played all six matches and scored 18 goals.

== Career ==
He started playing handball aged 8 at CSKA Moscow. Here he won the Soviet Men's Handball Championship several times, as well as the 1986 EHF Cup Winners' Cup and the 1988 European Cup. After 21 years at the club he left for the German 2nd Bundesliga team OSC Rheinhausen. He helped them getting promoted to the handball-Bundesliga in 1993, but they were relegated just the season after. He then retired and became the assistant coach at the club. A year later he was promoted to head coach of the club, where he was until 1998.

He then held several different coaching positions in the German 1st and 2nd Bundesliga. In 2012 he became the assistant coach at the Russia men's national handball team. He left this position after the 2015 World Men's Handball Championship.

== Titles ==
- Soviet Men's Handball Championship (6): 1977, 1978, 1979, 1980, 1982, 1983, 1987
- Soviet Men's Handball Cup (3): 1984, 1985, 1986
- EHF Cup Winners' Cup: 1987
- EHF Champions League:
  - Winner: 1988
  - Finalist: 1983
