= Limburgse Handbal Dagen =

Dutch handball tournament

Limburgse Handbal Dagen (Limbourg Handball Days)
Tournament information
- Sport: Handball
- Location: Limburg, Netherlands
- Month played: December (27, 28 and 29)
- Established: 1988
- Number of tournaments: 28 (in 2015)
- Administrator: Stichting Limburgse Handbal Dagen

Tournament statistics
- First champion: (Soviet Union) MAI Moscow
- Most championships: (Norway) Viking Stavanger (3x)

Current champion
- (Norway) Halden Topphåndball

The Limburgse Handbal Dagen / Limbourg Handball Days is a handball tournament organized since 1988 in Limburg (Netherlands), especially in the cities of Sittard, Geleen and Beek. The tournament lasts for 3 days with teams from Europe, Africa and Asia.

== History ==
It all started in the spring of 1988, the year that HV Sittardia celebrated their forty-year anniversary. They wanted to organise an international tournament in a celebration of this anniversary. The initial period of the tournament was in September, before the start of the Dutch competition, but it was too short for a proper organisation. That's why the committee decided to organize the tournament in the period between Christmas and New Year. After an interest in a co-organisaters Blauw-Wit Neerbeek and V&L, the Limburgse Handbal Dagen were born.

== List of winners ==
1988 · (Soviet Union) MAI Moscow; 1989 · (Netherlands) HV Sittardia; 1990 · (Soviet Union) SKIF Krasnodar; 1991 · (Belarus) SKA Minsk; 1992 · (Russia) Nova Petersburg; 1993 · (Croatia) RK Medveščak Zagreb; 1994 · (France) Paris St. Germain; 1995 · (Norway) Viking Stavanger; 1996 · (France) US Ivry Handball; 1997 · (Norway) Viking Stavanger; 1998 · (Norway) IL Runar Sandefjord; 1999 · (Norway) Viking Stavanger; 2000 · (Denmark) Team Tvis Holstebro; 2001 · (Russia) Lukoil/Dynamo Astrakhan; 2002 · (Federal Republic of Yugoslavia) HC Lovcen-Cetinje	2003 · (Denmark) Fredericia HK; 2004 · (Denmark) Viborg HK; 2005 · (Poland) KS Vive Kielce; 2006 · (Russia) Lukoil/Dynamo Astrakhan; 2007 · (Ukraine) Budivelnyk Brovary; 2008 · (Belgium) KV Sasja HC Hoboken; 2009 · (Portugal) FC Porto; 2010 · (Portugal) SL Benfica; 2011 · (Netherlands) Limburg Lions; 2012 · (Portugal) FC Porto; 2013 · (Portugal) Águas Santas; 2014 · (Russia) GK Permskie Medvedi; 2015 · (Portugal) ABC UMinho; 2016 · (Norway) Halden Topphåndball

=== Plural winners ===
Victories	Team	Years	Country
3	Viking Stavanger	1995, 1997, 1999	Norway
2	Lukoil/Dynamo Astrakhan	2001, 2006	Russia
2	FC Porto	2009, 2012	Portugal

=== Victories per country ===
Victories	Country
5	Norway, Portugal
4	Russia
3	Denmark
2	France, Netherlands, Soviet Union
1	Belgium, Belarus, Croatia, Poland, Ukraine, FR Yugoslavia

== Top three places ==
Year	First	Second	Third
2016	(Norway) Halden Topphåndball	(Netherlands) Limburg Lions	South Korea
2015	(Portugal) ABC UMinho	(Norway) Viking HK	(Netherlands) Targos Bevo HC
2014	(Russia) GK Permskie Medvedi	(Portugal) SL Benfica	(Netherlands) Limburg Lions
2013	(Portugal) Águas Santas	(Netherlands) Limburg Lions	(Spain) FC Barcelona B
2012	(Portugal) FC Porto	(Estonia) Põlva Serviti	(Spain) GlobalCaja Ciudad Encantada
2011	(Netherlands) Limburg Lions	(Belarus) HC Meshkov Brest	(Croatia) RK Porec
2010	(Portugal) SL Benfica	(Bosnia and Herzegovina) RK Borac Banja Luka	(Russia) St. Petersburg HC
2009	(Portugal) FC Porto	(Estonia) Põlva Serviti	(Japan) K-Sports HC
2008	(Belgium) KV Sasja HC Hoboken	(Ukraine) ZTR Zaporizhzhia	(Spain) Sociedad Deportiva Teucro
2007	(Ukraine) Budivelnyk Brovary	(Tunisia) Étoile Sportive du Sahel	(Japan) Daido Steel Nagoya
2006	(Russia) Lukoil/Dynamo Astrakhan	(Sweden) IFK Skövde	(Croatia) Perutnina Pipo IPC
2005	(Poland) KS Vive Kielce	(Denmark) TMS Ringsted	(France) US Dunkerque
2004	(Denmark) Viborg HK	(Sweden) IFK Skövde	(Ukraine) ZTR Zaporizhzhia
2003	(Denmark) Fredericia HK	(Spain) CBM Valladolid	(Ukraine) Portovik Yuzhny
2002	(Federal Republic of Yugoslavia) HC Lovcen-Cetinje	(Denmark) Team Helsinge	(Netherlands) Wealer/V&L
2001	(Russia) Lukoil/Dynamo Astrakhan	(Netherlands) Wealer/V&L	(Sweden) IFK Tumba HK
2000	(Denmark) Team Tvis Holstebro	Lithuania	(Czech Republic) SKP Frydek-Mistek
1999	(Norway) Viking Stavanger	(Denmark) GOG Gudme	(Netherlands) HV Sittardia
1998	(Norway) IL Runar Sandefjord	(France) Sporting Toulouse 31	(Netherlands) HV Sittardia
1997	(Norway) Viking Stavanger	(Netherlands) HV Sittardia	(Czech Republic) Banik Karvina
1996	(France) US Ivry Handball	(Germany) Tus Nettelstedt	(Denmark) Vadum IF
1995	(Norway) Viking Stavanger	(Sweden) Sävehof Partille	(Netherlands) Hirschmann/V&L
1994	(France) Paris St. Germain	(Sweden) Guif Eskilstuna	(Norway) Sandefjord TIF
1993	(Croatia) RK Medveščak Zagreb	(France) US Ivry Handball	(Sweden) Redbergslids IK
1992	(Russia) Nova Petersburg	(Slovenia) Kolinska Slovan	(Sweden) IFK Skövde
1991	(Belarus) SKA Minsk	(Netherlands) VGZ/Sittardia	(Sweden) Drott Halmstad
1990	(Soviet Union) SKIF Krasnodar	(Czechoslovakia) HT Tatran Prešov	(Sweden) Redbergslids IK
1989	(Netherlands) HV Sittardia	(West Germany) Motor Eisenach	(Soviet Union) Granitas Kaunas
1988	(Soviet Union) MAI Moscow	(Netherlands) Herschi/V&L	(Czechoslovakia) Lokomotiva Trnava
