= Oleg Kuleshov =

Russian handball player and coach

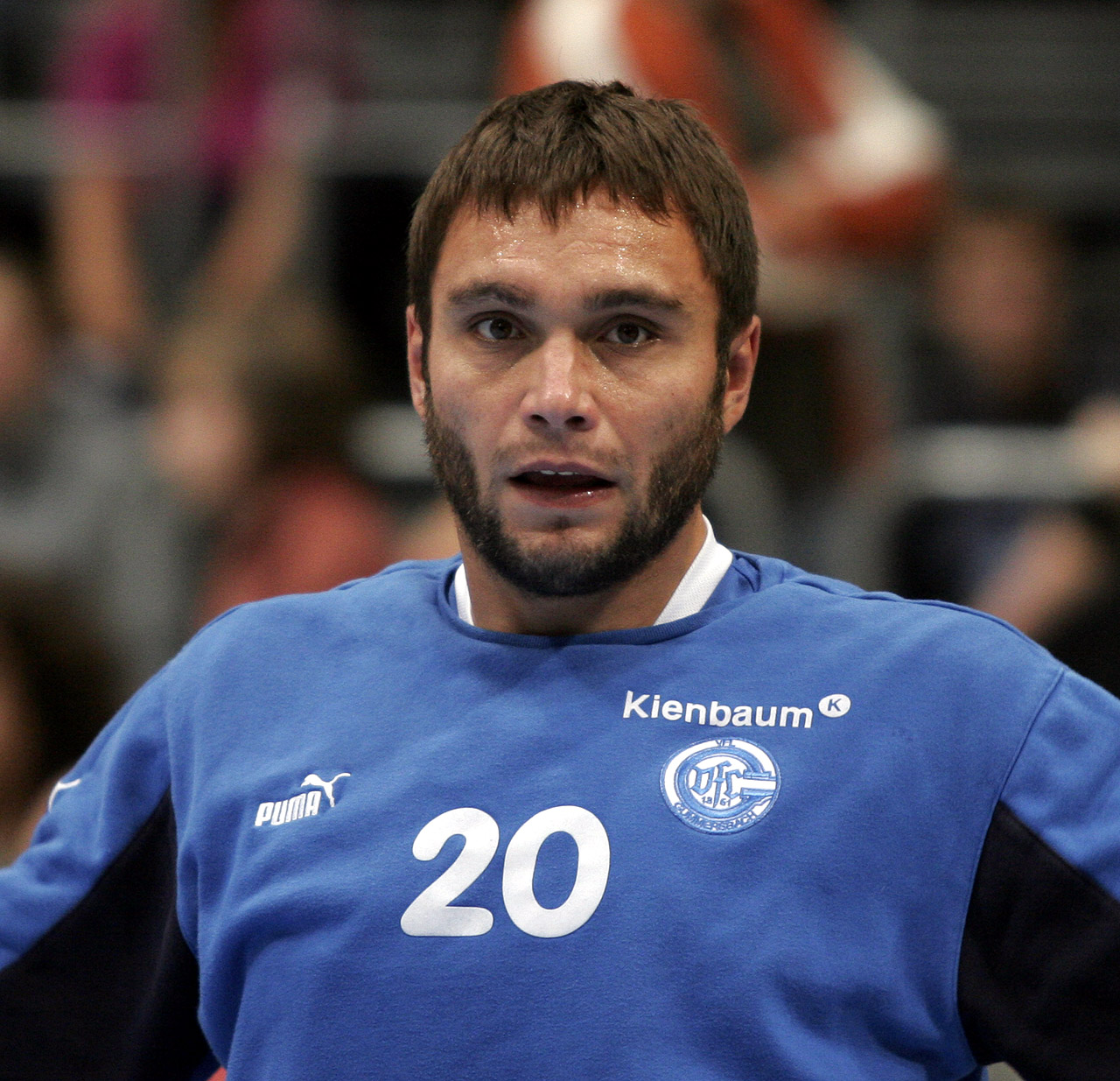
- Kuleshov in 2007

Personal information
- Full name: Oleg Mikhaylovich Kuleshov
- Nationality: Russian
- Born: 15 April 1974 (age 52) Omsk, Soviet Union
- Height: 184 cm (72 in)

Sport
- Sport: Handball
- Position: Centre back

Youth career
- Years: Team
- -1991: Omsk

Senior clubs
- Years: Team
- 1991-1999: HC Kaustik Volgograd
- 1999-2007: SC Magdeburg
- 2007-2008: VfL Gummersbach
National team
Years	Team	Apps	(Gls)
1996–2007	Russia	123	(390)

Teams managed
- 2011-2012: HF Springe
- 2012-2015: Russia men's team
- 2016-2018: HF Springe
- 2018-2019: SKIF Krasnodar
- 2019-2020: CSKA Moscow women
- 2021-2024: Dinamo Volgograd
- 2024: CSKA Moscow women
Medal record
Olympic Games
Bronze medal – third place	2004 Athens	Team
World Championships
Gold medal – first place	1997 Japan	Team
European Championships
Gold medal – first place	1996 Spain	Team
Silver medal – second place	2000 Croatia	Team

Oleg Mikhaylovich Kuleshov (Russian: Олег Михайлович Кулешов, born 15 April 1974) is a former Russian handball player and current coach who won both the World Championship and European Championship. He also competed in the 1996 Summer Olympics and in the 2004 Summer Olympics. Currently he is the head coach of Dinamo Volgograd women's handball team.

== Career ==
Kuleshov played early in his career for HC Kaustik Volgograd from 1991 to 1999, where he won the Russian Handball Super League in 1996, 1997 and 1998.

He then joined German side SC Magdeburg, where he won the 2011 Handball-Bundesliga, EHF Cup Winners' Cup and Club World Cup. In 2002 he won the EHF Champions League and in 2007 he won the EHF Cup.

In 2007 he joined VfL Gummersbach. A year later he retired due to injuries.

=== National team ===
Kuleshov played 123 games for the Russian national team, scoring 390 goals. He was part of the Russian 1990's golden generation that won the 1996 European Men's Handball Championship and the 1997 World Men's Handball Championship.

In 1996 he was a member of the Russian team which finished fifth in the Olympic tournament. He played all six matches and scored 23 goals. Eight years later he won the bronze medal with the Russian team in the 2004 Olympic tournament. He played all eight matches again and scored twelve goals.

== Coaching career ==
Kuleshov was the coach of German team HF Springe from July 2011 until he was released of his contract in November 2012.

In March 2012 he became the head coach of the Russian national team. He was in this position until February 2015.

For the 2016-17 he returned to coach HF Springe in the 3. Liga. Afterwards he became the head coach of the Russian club SKIF Krasnodar. Here he was until August 2019. In October 2019 he took over at HC Spartak Moscow, where he was until October 2020.

From the 2021-22 season he coached the Russian women's team HC Dinamo Volgograd.

From the 2024-25 season he joined league rivals CSKA Moscow. He was however released of his contract already in October 2024.
