= Russian Men's Handball Cup =

Handball competition

- Founded: 2005
- Country: Russia
- Confederation: EHF (Europe)
- Most recent champion: HBC CSKA Moscow (2023–24)
- Most titles: Chekhovskiye Medvedi (15 titles)
- Level on pyramid: 1
- International cup: EHF Cup
- 2023–24 season

The Russian Men's Handball Cup or in russian (Кубок России по гандболу среди мужчин) is the second most important handball competition for clubs in russia after the Russian Handball Super League it was introduced first in the 2005/2006 season.

== Winners list ==
| Season | Winners | Finalist | 3rd Place |
|---|---|---|---|
| 2006 | Chekhovskiye Medvedi | Chekhovskiye Medvedi II | Portovik |
| 2007 | Chekhovskiye Medvedi | ? | |
| 2008 | Chekhovskiye Medvedi | ? | |
| 2009 | Chekhovskiye Medvedi | Kaustik Volgograd | Dynamo Astrakhan |
| 2010 | Chekhovskiye Medvedi | Kaustik Volgograd | Polyot Chelyabinsk |
| 2011 | Chekhovskiye Medvedi | Kaustik Volgograd | Universitet Lesgafta – Neva |
| 2012 | Chekhovskiye Medvedi | Permskie Medvedi | Kaustik Volgograd |
| 2013 | Chekhovskiye Medvedi | Kaustik Volgograd | Saint Petersburg HC |
| 2014 | Permskie Medvedi | Saint Petersburg HC | Chekhovskiye Medvedi |
| 2015 | Chekhovskiye Medvedi | SKIF Krasnodar | Permskie Medvedi |
| 2016 | Chekhovskiye Medvedi | Saint Petersburg HC | Dynamo Astrakhan |
| 2017 | SKIF Krasnodar | Chekhovskiye Medvedi | SSAU-Saratov |
| 2018 | Chekhovskiye Medvedi | Spartak Moscow | SSAU-Saratov |
| 2019 | Chekhovskiye Medvedi | Spartak Moscow | SKIF Krasnodar |
| 2020 | Chekhovskiye Medvedi | HBC CSKA Moscow | Permskie Medvedi |
| 2021 | Chekhovskiye Medvedi | SKIF Krasnodar | HBC CSKA Moscow |
| 2022 | Dinamo Viktor Stavropol | HBC CSKA Moscow | Chekhovskiye Medvedi |
| 2023 | Chekhovskiye Medvedi | Permskie Medvedi | HBC CSKA Moscow |
| 2024 | HBC CSKA Moscow | Permskie Medvedi | Chekhovskiye Medvedi |

== Titles by club ==
| Rk. | Club | Titles | Years won |
|---|---|---|---|
| 1 | Chekhovskiye Medvedi | 15 | 2006, 2007, 2008, 2009, 2010, 2011, 2012, 2013, 2015, 2016, 2018, 2019, 2020, 2021, 2023 |
| 2 | Permskie Medvedi | 1 | 2014 |
| 3 | SKIF Krasnodar | 1 | 2017 |
| 4 | Dinamo Viktor Stavropol | 1 | 2022 |
| 5 | HBC CSKA Moscow | 1 | 2024 |
