= Russian Super League (disambiguation) =

The Russian Superleague was Russia's top ice hockey league from 1996 to 2008.

Russian Super League may also refer to:

- Russian Bandy Super League, the top Russian bandy league
- Russian Basketball Super League, a basketball league
- Professional Rugby League, a rugby union competition formerly known as Superleague
- Russian Volleyball Super League, a volleyball league
- Russian Handball Super League, men's handball league
- Russian Women's Handball Super League, women's handball league
