= Valentin Buzmakov =

Russian handball player

Personal information
- Nationality: Russian
- Born: 17 April 1985 (age 41) Astrakhan, Russia
- Height: 1.92 m (6 ft 4 in)

Sport
- Sport: Handball
- Position: Left back
- Current club: Permskie Medvedi (head coach)

Senior clubs
- Years: Team
- 2003–2008: Dynamo Astrakhan
- 2009–2018: Permskie Medvedi
National team
Years	Team	Apps	(Gls)
–	Russia	5	(6)

Teams managed
- 2018–: Permskie Medvedi
- 2021–: Russia (assistant)

Valentin Buzmakov (born 17 April 1985) is a former Russian handball player for the Russian national team. Currently he is a head coach for Permskie Medvedi and assistant coach for the Russian national team.

He competed at the 2016 European Men's Handball Championship.
