= Oleg Khodkov =

Russian handball player

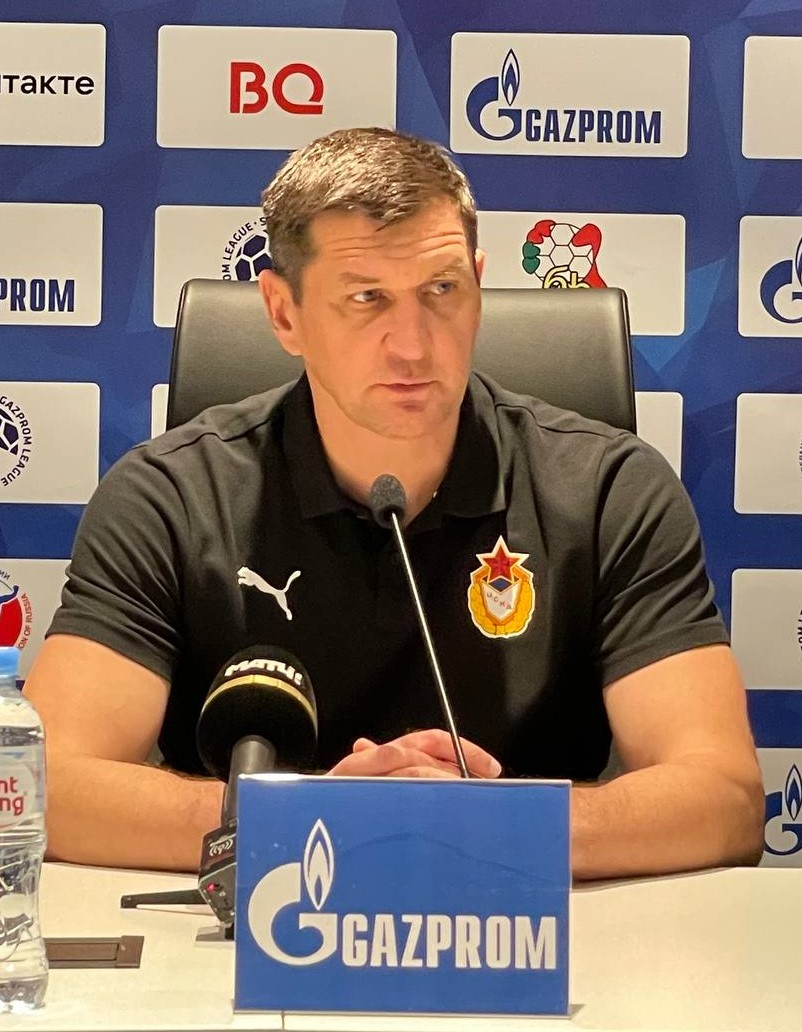

Personal information
- Nationality: Russian
- Born: 5 April 1974 (age 52) Krasnodar Krai, Russia
- Height: 1.96 m (6 ft 5 in)

Sport
- Sport: Handball
- Position: Right back
- Current club: CSKA Moscow (head coach)

Senior clubs
- Years: Team
- –1999: (Russia) SKIF Krasnodar
- 1999–2001: (Germany) VfL Gummersbach
- 2001–2003: (Spain) CD Bidasoa
- 2003–2005: (Russia) SKIF Krasnodar
National team
- Years: Team
- 1997–2001: Russia

Teams managed
- 2016–2019: (Russia) SKIF Krasnodar
- 2021–: (Russia) CSKA Moscow
Medal record
Representing Russia
Men's handball
Olympic Games
Gold medal – first place	2000 Sydney	Team
World Championships
Silver medal – second place	1999 Egypt	Team
European Championships
Silver medal – second place	2000 Croatia	Team

Oleg Khodkov (Russian: Олег Валерьевич Ходьков; born 5 April 1974 in Krasnodar) is a former Russian handball player. He is the current head coach of HBC CSKA Moscow.

He played for the Russia men's national handball team at the 2000 Summer Olympics in Sydney, where Russia won the gold medal.
