= Kamanin =

Kamanin (Russian: Каманин) is a Russian masculine surname originating from a slang word kamanitsya meaning to swagger. Its feminine counterpart is Kamanina. It may refer to

- Alexey Kamanin (born 1978), Russian handball player
- Nikolai Kamanin (1908–1982), Soviet aviator
