= Soviet Men's Handball Cup =

- Founded: 1980
- Country: Soviet Union
- Confederation: EHF (Europe)
- Most recent champion: SKIF Krasnodar 5th title
- Most titles: SKIF Krasnodar 5 Titles
- Level on pyramid: 1
- International cup: EHF Cup Winners' Cup

The USSR Men's Handball Cup in ( Russian : Кубок СССР по гандболу среди мужчин ) was a competition of the USSR men's handball teams, and it was considered the second competition after the Soviet Men's Handball Championship.

== Winners list ==
Season	Winners
1980	SKA Minsk
1981	SKA Minsk
1982	SKA Minsk
1983	?
1984	CSKA Moscow
1985	CSKA Moscow
1986	CSKA Moscow
1987	SKA Minsk
1988	SKIF Krasnodar
1989	SKIF Krasnodar
1990	SKIF Krasnodar
1991	SKIF Krasnodar
1992	SKIF Krasnodar

== Winners by club ==
Rk.	Club	N#	Years won	Current Republic
1	SKIF Krasnodar	5	1988, 1989, 1990, 1991, 1992	Russia
2	SKA Minsk	4	1980, 1981, 1982, 1987	Belarus
3	CSKA Moscow	3	1984, 1985, 1986	Russia
