= Aleksandr Ermakov (handballer) =

Russian handball player (born 1996)

Personal information
- Nationality: Russian
- Born: 14 January 1996 (age 30) Astrakhan, Russia
- Height: 1.95 m (6 ft 5 in)

Sport
- Sport: Handball
- Position: Pivot
- Current club: Chekhovskiye Medvedi
- Number: 55
National team
Years	Team	Apps	(Gls)
2020–	Russia	3	(6)

Aleksandr Ermakov (born 14 January 1996) is a Russian handball player for Chekhovskiye Medvedi and the Russian national team.

He represented Russia at the 2020 European Men's Handball Championship.
