= Roman Ostashchenko =

Russian handball player

Personal information
- Nationality: Russian
- Born: 26 September 1992 (age 34)
- Height: 1.88 m (6 ft 2 in)

Sport
- Sport: Handball
- Position: Left wing
- Current club: Chekhovskiye Medvedi
- Number: 19
National team
Years	Team	Apps	(Gls)
–	Russia	26	(20)

Roman Ostashchenko (born 26 September 1992) is a Russian handball player for Chekhovskiye Medvedi and the Russian national team.

He represented Russia at the 2019 World Men's Handball Championship.
