= Dmitry Kornev =

Russian handball player

Personal information
- Nationality: Russian
- Born: 16 June 1992 (age 34) Vologda, Russia
- Height: 1.86 m (6 ft 1 in)

Sport
- Sport: Handball
- Position: Right wing
- Current club: Chekhovskiye Medvedi
- Number: 24
National team
Years	Team	Apps	(Gls)
2019–	Russia	5	(3)

Dmitry Aleksandrovich Kornev (Russian: Дмитрий Александрович Корнев; born 16 June 1992) is a Russian handball player for Chekhovskiye Medvedi and the Russian national team.

He represented Russia at the 2020 European Men's Handball Championship.
