= Ankara Büyükşehir Belediyesi Spor Kulübü =

Multi-sports club in Ankara, Turkey

- Formation: 1978; 48 years ago
- Purpose: Sport: athletics, badminton, basketball, boxing, football, handball, ice hockey, judo, kickboxing, swimming, table tennis, taekwondo, volleyball, weightlifting, wrestling
- Location: Ankara, Turkey
- Formerly called: Büyükşehir Belediyesi Ankaraspor Kulübü

Ankara Büyükşehir Belediyesi Spor Kulübü, shortly Ankara BB SK, is a multi-sports club owned by the Metropolitan Municipality of Ankara in Turkey. Founded in 1978 as a football only club, it expanded by opening many other sport sections throughout its history. It was formerly named BB Ankaraspor.

== History ==
=== Men's football (1978) ===
The club's first sport activity was in football establishing the men's football side Ankaraspor in 1878. The team's name changed a number of times, so in 1984 it was renamed to "Ankara Büyükşehir Belediyesi Spor Kulübü". In 1998, the name switched to "Büyükşehir Belediyesi Ankaraspor Kulübü. The football club changed its name to "Ankaraspor A.Ş." in 2005 after many other sport branches were opened. The name "Osmanlıspor")for SC"Ottoman) was adapted in 2014. Finally, the team's name changed to its original "Ankaraspor.

=== Men's and women's boxing ===
The boxing section of the club is one of the oldest. The male and female boxers participated at international competitions, and won titles in world and European championships.

=== Men's basketball (1984) ===
In 1984, the basketball branch was formed by the Municipality's EGO Company (for "Electricity, Gas and Bus" Turkish: Elektrik, Gaz, Otobüs) under the name ABB EGO Spor. The team became champion of the regional "Ankara Senior Men's Basketball League" in 2022.

=== Men's ice hockey (1990) ===
The club formed the country's first ice hockey team in 1990. The men's ice hockey team was promoted in 2015 to the Turkish Ice Hockey Super League. As of the 2022–23 season, they became seven times champion. Many other domestic ice hockey teams transferred players, who were developed in Ankara BB SK.

=== Men's wrestling (1994) ===
The sport wrestling section was founded in 1994. The focus in this branch is to develop young wrestlers in a farm system avoiding transfers from outside. In 2021, the Freestyle wrestling team finished the Second League as runner-up, and the Greco-Roman wrestling team became champion. Both teams were promoted to the First League.

=== Women's football (1995) ===
The women's football side of the club, the Fomget Gençlik ve Spor (for "Folklore Music Youth Community and Youth Sports Club" Turkish: Folklör Müzik Gençlik Topluluğu ve Gençlik Spor kulübü), was founded in 1995. The team has been playing in the Turkish women's football top-level league since the 2019–20 season. The team finished the 2022–23 Turkish Women's Football Super League season as champion, and was entitled so to play at the 2023–24 UEFA Women's Champions League qualifying rounds.

=== Men's and women's Taekwondo (1995) ===
In 1995, the Taekwondo branch was formed having men's and women's teams.

=== Men's and women's handball(1997) ===
The handball section of the club was founded in 1997. The men's handball team, Ankara BB SK, formerly BB Ankaraspor, competed in the First Leagueuntil 200, and then they were promoted to the Super League. They took part at the European Men's Handball Championship. The women's side, Ankara BB EGO Spor, was promoted to the Turkish Women's Handball Super League after the 2020–21 season.

=== Men's and women's table tennis (1998) ===
Formed in 1998, the table tennis section consists of children, youth as well as male and female sportspeople. The men's and women's teams compete in the Third League.

=== Men's and women's weightlifting (1999) ===
The weightlifting section was opened in 1999 with convict inmates of the juvenile detention center. The men's weightlifting team was Turkish champion in 2022, and the women's team in 2023.

=== Men's and women's badminton (2000) ===
In 2000, the badminton branch was formed. It consists of athletes of all age categories trained in infrastructure.

=== Youth Judo (2002) ===
The Judo section was established in 2002 for children and youth. Most of the judoka are members of the "Center for Children Working on the Streets of Ankara".

=== Men's and women's athletics (2005) ===
The club formed its athletics section in 2005. The sport activities started in 2006. The male and female athletes of the club achieved success, and were promoted to the Super League.

=== Men's and women's kickboxing (2012) ===
The kickboxing branch was added in 2012. The men's and women's kickboxers of the club compete also internationally.

=== Women's volleyball (2021) ===
The club established its women's volleyball branch in 2021. The women's volleyball team has been competing in the Turkish Women's Volleyball Second League since then.

=== Swimming ===
The club has a swimming section.

== Facilities ==
The men's football team play their home matches in Ankara Yenikent Sradium in Sincan. The ice hockey's home ground is Ankara Ice Skating Palace in Bahçelievler. For the handball matches is the home ground Cebeci Yaşar Sevim Handball Hall. The basketball team play their home matches at Ankara Arena in Altındağ.

== Notable member sportspeople ==
- Selda Akgöz (born 1993), female footballer
- Benan Altıntaş (born 2001), female footballer
- Ergün Batmaz (born 1967), weightlifter
- Engin Bekdemir (born 1992), footballer

- Oğuzhan Çapar (born 1996), footballer

- Burak Çapkınoğlu (born 1995), footballer
- Funda Güleç (born 2003), female kickboxer,
- Melike Günal (born 1998), female weightlifter
- Tuğba Karataş (born 1992), female footballer
- Bahattin Köse (born 1990), footballer
- Erdal Öztürk (born 1996), footballer
- Yasemin Şahin /born 1988), female handball player
- Recep Yemişçi (born 1999), footballer
- Fatoş Yıldırım (born 1994), female footballer
