= Aliaksandr Bachko =

Belarusian handball player

Personal information
- Nationality: Belarusian
- Born: 15 August 1989 (age 37) Hrodna, Byelorussian SSR, Soviet Union
- Height: 1.89 m (6 ft 2 in)

Sport
- Sport: Handball
- Position: Centre back
- Current club: HBC CSKA Moscow
- Number: 10
National team
Years	Team	Apps	(Gls)
–	Belarus	5	(1)

Aliaksandr Bachko (Belarusian: Аляксандр Бачко; born 15 August 1989) is a Belarusian handball player for HBC CSKA Moscow and the Belarusian national team.
