= Funda Güleç =

Turkish kickboxer (born 2003)

- Born: 18 April 2003 (age 22); Ankara, Turkey
- Nationality: Turkish
- Weight: 1.66 m (5 ft 5 1/2 in)
- Division: 60 kg
- Style: Kickboxing

Other information
- Notable club: Ankara BB SK

Funda Güleç
Medal record

Representing Turkey

Women's Kickboxing

European Games
Bronze medal – third place	2023 Myślenice	P.F. 60 kg

Funda Güleç (born 18 April 2003) is a Turkish kickboxer competing in the point fighting category of the 60 kg division.

== Sport career ==
In 2022, Güleç became the Turkish champion in the point fighting category of 60 kg division in Kocaeli. She took the gold medal in the Juniors 60 kg category at the "Victory Day Cup" in Kırşehir.

She won the bronze medal i at the 2023 European Games held in Myślenice, Poland.

She is a member of Ankara BB SK.

== Personal life ==
Born on 18 April 2003, Funda Güleç is a native of Ankara, Turley. She is 1.66 m (5 ft 5 1/2 in) tall.
