= Viktar Zaitsau =

Belarusian handball player

Personal information
- Nationality: Belarusian
- Born: 27 August 1992 (age 34) Babruysk, Belarus
- Height: 1.95 m (6 ft 5 in)

Sport
- Sport: Handball
- Position: Left Back/Line player
- Current club: GK Permskie Medvedi
- Number: 44
National team
Years	Team	Apps	(Gls)
–	Belarus	30	(30)

Viktar Zaitsau (born 27 August 1992) is a Belarusian handball player for GK Permskie Medvedi and the Belarusian national team.
