= Alexey Kamanin =

Russian handball player (born 1978)

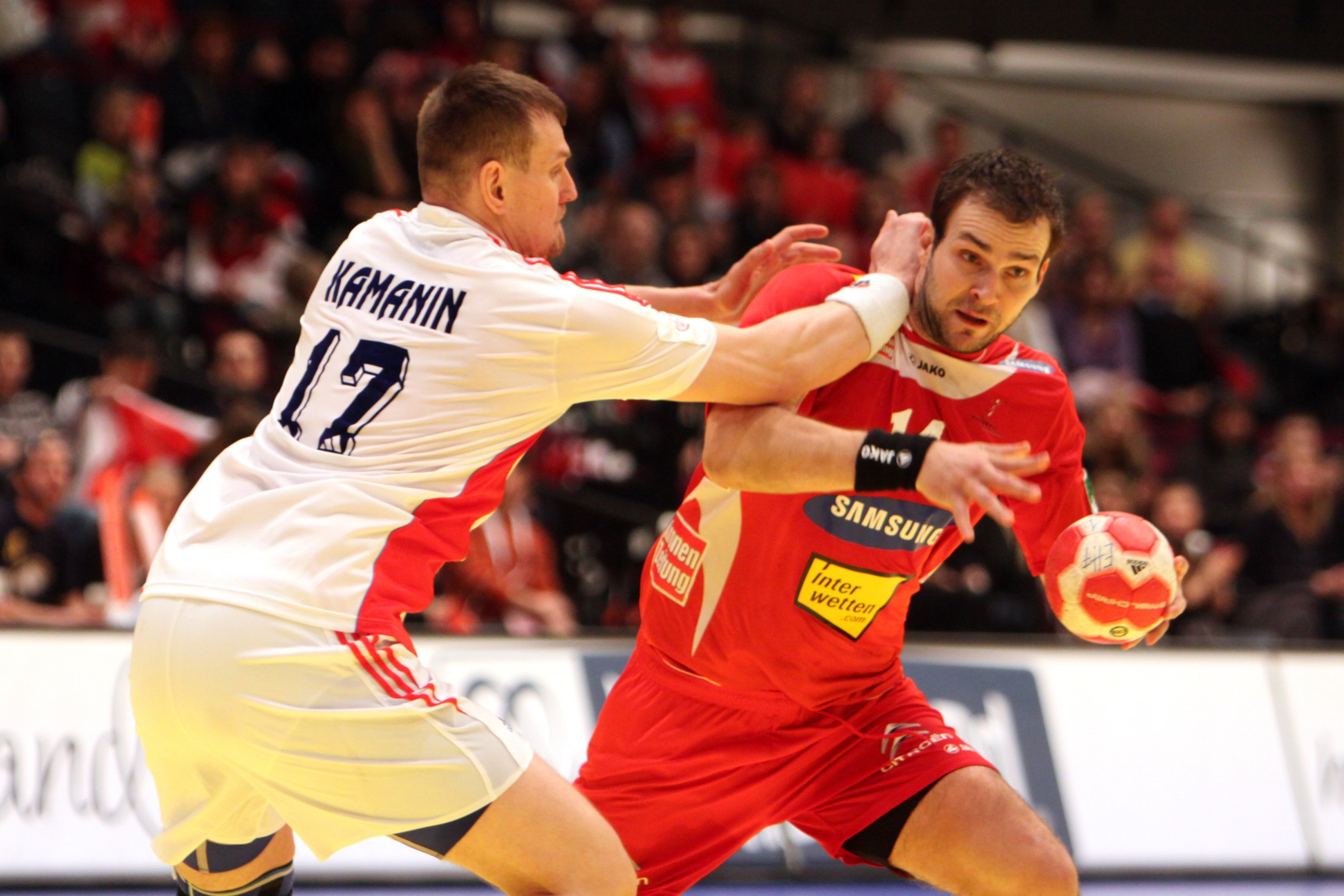
- Kamanin in 2010

Personal information
- Full name: Aleksey Nikolayevich Kamanin
- Nationality: Russia
- Born: 6 June 1978 (age 48) Odessa
- Height: 1.97 m (6 ft 6 in)

Sport
- Sport: Handball
- Position: right back

Senior clubs
- Years: Team
- –: Chekhovskiye Medvedi
National team
- Years: Team
- –: Russia

Aleksey Nikolayevich Kamanin (Алексей Николаевич Каманин, born 6 June 1978 in Odessa) is a Russian handball player. He played for the Russia men's national handball team as a right back. He was a part of the team at the 2008 Summer Olympics. On club level he played for Chekhovskiye Medvedi in Russia.
