= Burak Çapkınoğlu =

Turkish footballer

Personal information
- Date of birth: 25 February 1995 (age 31)
- Place of birth: Hopa, Turkey
- Height: 1.86 m (6 ft 1 in)
- Position: Goalkeeper

Team information
- Current team: Kepezspor
- Number: 14

Youth career
- 2008-2010: Hacettepe
- 2010-2011: Gençlerbirliği
- 2011-2012: Hacettepe
- 2012-2015: Gençlerbirliği

Senior career*
Years	Team	Apps	(Gls)
2015–2019	Hacettepe	27	(0)
2019–2020	Gençlerbirliği	1	(0)
2019–2020	→ Hacettepe (loan)	16	(0)
2020–2022	Adanaspor	25	(0)
2022–2023	Ankaraspor	34	(0)
2023–2024	İskenderunspor	11	(0)
2024	Serie Belediyespor	14	(0)
2024–	Kepezspor	20	(0)
- * Club domestic league appearances and goals as of 8 November 2025

Burak Çapkınoğlu (born 25 February 1995) is a Turkish professional footballer who plays as a goalkeeper for TFF 2. Lig club Kepezspor.

== Club career ==
Çapkınoğlu made his professional debut with Gençlerbirliği in a 3-0 Süper Lig loss to Beşiktaş J.K. on 25 July 2020.
