= Saint Petersburg HC =

Handball team in Russia

HC Zenit
- Founded: December 1964
- Arena: Yubileyny Sports Palace
- Capacity: 7,700
- Head coach: Dmitri Torgovanov
- League: Russian Handball Super League
- 2025/26: 2nd
- Club colours

HC Zenit Saint Petersburg (Russian: Гандбольный клуб «Зенит» ; previously was known as HC Neva) is a Russian handball team located in Saint Petersburg. Their home matches are played at the Yubileyny Sports Palace.

They compete in the Russian Handball Super League and in the SEHA League. As the national medalist club competed in the EHF Champions League in 2010–2014.

In reaction to the 2022 Russian invasion of Ukraine, the International Handball Federation banned Russian athletes, and the European Handball Federation suspended the Russian clubs from competing in European handball competitions.

== History ==
=== Origins ===
In the 1950s, a handball team "Trud" was created at the Vulcan plant in Leningrad by the initiative of Nikolai Vishnyakov and Yuri Romanov. This team was the first in the history of Leningrad to receive the right to compete in the USSR championship, but it was not possible to achieve serious success, as the team was amateur and could not fight on an equal footing with the grandees of domestic handball.

=== Creation and First years ===
In 1964, a team of the same name was created at the Bolshevik plant. Viktor Dmitrievich Fomenko was instructed to train the team. The Bolshevik team could not achieve special success and after the division of the USSR championship into divisions, it was in the lowest third.

=== Neva ===
In 1973, the team was able to make it to the top division, but under a new name: HC Neva.

In 1979, on the basis of the academy named after P. F. Lesgaft a sports school was opened, from which many famous handball players came out, who later joined the senior team.

In 1993, Neva became the first Russian handball champion. The preliminary stage of Neva finished in the first place. In the superfinal, Neva met with the team from Chelyabinsk "Polyot", which took second place at the end of the preliminary stage. The final went up to two victories. Neva won away with a score of 29:26 and at home 29:27, becoming the first champion of Russia in history. However, then the club lost ground and next time became a prize-winner only more than 10 years later.

Since 2001, the team has been called "Stepan Razin - Neva" and under the leadership of Yuri Alexandrovich Babenko became the bronze medalist of the Russian Championship 2004/05. Soon the club lost its title sponsor, which led to financial problems, and the team was forced to refuse to participate in Super League matches. As a result, the club was supported by the university named after P. F. Lesgaft, and a year later the team called "University - Neva" returned to the Super League, and since the 2009/2010 season, the club has become the silver medalist of the Russian championship five times in a row under the leadership of Dmitry Torgovanov, second only to the permanent champion: Chekhov Bears.

=== Zenit ===
On October 2, 2022, the club has been renamed to Zenit, and became a section of FC Zenit, alongside BC Zenit, VC Zenit and WFC Zenit. All sponsored by the government-owned gaz corporation Gazprom. Their first match under the rebranding was against CSKA Moscow in SEHA-Gazprom League, which ended with a draw (29:29).

== Names ==
- 1964—1973 — Bolshevik
- 1973—2001 — Neva
- 2001—2006 — Stepan Razin-Neva
- 2007—2022 — Universitet Lesgafta-Neva
- Since 2022 — Zenit

== Honours ==
- Russian Handball Super League: 2
  - Winners : 1993, 2024/2025

== European record ==
Season	Competition	Round	Club	Home	Away	Aggregate
2020–21	EHF European Cup	R3	(Latvia) ZRHK Tenax Dobele	31–23	29–30	60–53
2020–21	EHF European Cup	L16	(Bosnia and Herzegovina) Gračanica	33–21	25–23	58–44
2020–21	EHF European Cup	QF	(Greece) AEK Athens	21–30	27–29	48–59
2019–20	EHF Challenge Cup	R3	(Greece) Pas Aeropos Edessas	35–20	31–19	66–39
2019–20	EHF Challenge Cup	L16	(Norway) Halden Topphåndball	21–23	24–23	45–46
2018–19	EHF Challenge Cup	R3	(Luxembourg) HB Dudelange	31–12	24–16	55–28
2018–19	EHF Challenge Cup	L16	(Slovakia) MŠK Považská Bystrica	25–24	31–21	56–45
2018–19	EHF Challenge Cup	QF	(Belgium) HC Visé BM	41–19	33–26	74–45
2018–19	EHF Challenge Cup	SF	(Romania) CSM București	24–26	20–25	44–51
2017–18	EHF Cup	R2	(Iceland) FH	32–27	27–32	59–59 (3-4 (p))
2016–17	EHF Cup	R2	(Turkey) BB Ankaraspor	26–19	31–27	57–46
2016–17	EHF Cup	R3	(Israel) Maccabi Tel Aviv	25–23	23–28	48–51
2015–16	EHF Challenge Cup	R3	(Bosnia and Herzegovina) HC Vogošća Poljine Hills	26–22	24–25	50–47
2015–16	EHF Challenge Cup	L16	(Turkey) BB Ankaraspor	30–26	31–23	61–49
2015–16	EHF Challenge Cup	QF	(Portugal) S.L. Benfica	27–25	20–24	47–49

== Team ==
Squad for the 2026–27 season

Goalkeepers

- 12 (Russia) Ivan Sharov
- 93 (Russia) Dmitry Kuznetsov
- 94 (Russia) Nikita Mihailov

Left Wingers

- 25 (Russia) Timur Solodovnikov
- 26 (Russia) Nikita Iltinskii

Right Wingers

- 14 (Belarus) Yauheni Nikanovich
- 72 (Russia) Vsevolod Pavlyuchenkov

Line players

- 21 (Belarus) Viachaslau Bokhan
- 77 (Russia) Aleksei Chirkov
- 79 (Russia) Roman Tsarapkin

Left Backs

- 11 (Russia) Mikhail Vinogradov
- 23 (Russia) Ilya Belevtsov

Central Backs

- 7 (Russia) Saveliy Shalabanov
- 18 (Belarus) Aleh Lunya
- 96 (Belarus) Artsiom Kulak

Right Backs

- 5 (Russia) Dmitrii Kiselev
- 13 (Belarus) Pavel Duda
- 28 (Russia) Vitaly Petrov

=== Transfers ===
Transfers for the 2026–27 season

Joining

- (Russia) Nikita Mihailov (GK) (from (Russia) HC Kaustik Volgograd)
- (Russia) Ilya Belevtsov (LB) (from (Russia) HBC CSKA Moscow)
- (Russia) Saveliy Shalabanov (CB) (from (Russia) SKIF Krasnodar)
- (Belarus) Pavel Duda (RB) (from (Belarus) Masheka Mogilev)
- (Russia) Roman Tsarapkin (P) (from (Russia) HBC CSKA Moscow)

Leaving

- (Russia) Viktor Kireyev (GK) (retires)
- (Belarus) Dzmitry Khmialkou (LB) (to (Russia) HBC CSKA Moscow)
- (Belarus) Aleh Astrashapkin (RB)(to (Israel) Hapoel Rishon LeZion)
- (Russia) Nikita Larin (RW) (to (Russia) GK AK Bars)
- (Belarus) Viktar Zaitsau (P) (to (Russia) GK Permskie Medvedi)

=== Transfer History ===
Transfers for the 2025–26 season

Joining

- (Russia) Ivan Sharov (GK) from (Russia) Sungul Snezhinsk

Leaving

- (Russia) Maksim Popov (GK) to (Russia) Skif Omsk
