= GK Permskie Medvedi =

Russian handball club

Handball Club Permskie Medvedi
- Full name: Gandbolnij Klub Permskie Medvedi
- Founded: 1993; 33 years ago
- Arena: V.P. Sukharev Sport Complex
- Capacity: 2,100
- President: Alexey Nikiforov
- Head coach: Valentin Buzmakov
- League: Russian Handball Super League
- 2025-26: 3rd of 12
- Club colours
Home	Away

GK Permskie Medvedi is a Russian handball team located in Perm. Their home matches are played at the V.P. Sukharev Sport Complex. They compete in the Russian Handball Super League and in the SEHA League.

== Honours ==
- Russian Super League:
  - (silver) Runner-up : 2015, 2016, 2023
  - (bronze) Third place : 2014, 2026
- Russian Cup
  - (gold) Winners : 2014
  - (silver) Runner-up : 2012, 2023, 2024
  - (bronze) Third place : 2015, 2020
- Russian Super Cup
  - (silver) Runner-up : 2014, 2024

== Team ==
Squad for the 2026–27 season

Goalkeepers

- 77 (Belarus) Ilya Usik
- 86 (Russia) Andrey Dyachenko
- 88 (Russia) Aleksandr Popov

Left Wingers

- 31 (Russia) Pavel Arkatov
- 34 (Russia) Roman Kalashnikov

Right Wingers

- 47 (Russia) Kirill Voronin
- 76 (Russia) Andrey Volkhonsky

Line players

- 21 (Russia) Ivan Firsov
- 44 (Belarus) Viktar Zaitsau
- 57 (Russia) Danil Merts

Left Backs

- 23 (Russia) Arseniy Ukhvarkin
- 25 (Russia) Evgeniy Dzemin
- 26 (Russia) Nikita Ruchaev
- 35 (Russia) Aleksandr Grotskii

Central Backs

- 10 (Russia) Sergey Bolotin
- 45 (Russia) Aleksandr Arkatov

Right Backs

- 98 (Russia) Nikita Kamenev
- 99 (Russia) Dzmitry Svistunov

=== Transfers ===
Transfers for the season 2026–27

Joining

- (Russia) Pavel Arkatov (LW) (from (Russia) Sungul Snezhinsk)
- (Belarus) Viktar Zaitsau (P) (from (Russia) Saint Petersburg HC)

Leaving
