= Chekhovskiye Medvedi =

Russian handball club

Chekhovskie Medvedi
- Full name: Chekhovskie Medvedi Handball Club
- Founded: 1972 (as CSKA); 2001
- Arena: Olimpiysky Sport Palace
- Capacity: 3,000
- Head coach: Vladimir Maksimov
- League: Russian Handball Super League
- 2025-26: 4th
- Club colours
Home	Away

Chekhovskie Medvedi (Russian: Чеховские Медведи, English: Chekhov Bears) is a professional handball club from Chekhov, Moscow Oblast, Russia. They compete in the Russian Handball Super League and in the SEHA League. The organization was founded in 2001 on the basis of the disbanded original CSKA Moscow Handball Club. They are the most successful team in Russia with both the most Cup and league titles.

After the launching of the 2022 Russian invasion of Ukraine, the European Handball Federation in February 2022 temporarily suspended the team.

== Kits ==
AWAY
2014-15	2016-17	2017-18

== Accomplishments ==
=== As CSKA Moscow ===
- EHF Champions League
  - Winners (1): 1987–88
- EHF Cup Winner's Cup
  - Winners (1): 1986–87
- EHF Cup
  - Runners-up (1): 1990–91
- Soviet Handball Championship
  - Winners (9) (record): 1973, 1976, 1977, 1978, 1979, 1980, 1982, 1983, 1987
- Soviet Handball Cup
  - Winners (3): 1984, 1985, 1986
- Russian Handball Super League
  - Winners (4): 1994, 1995, 2000, 2001

=== As Chekhovskiye Medvedi ===
- EHF Cup Winner's Cup
  - Winners (1): 2005–06
- Russian Handball Super League
  - Winners (21) (record): 2002, 2003, 2004, 2005, 2006, 2007, 2008, 2009, 2010, 2011, 2012, 2013, 2014, 2015, 2016, 2017, 2018, 2019, 2020, 2021, 2022
- Russian Handball Cup
  - Winners (15) (record): 2006, 2007, 2008, 2009, 2010, 2011, 2012, 2013, 2015, 2016, 2018, 2019, 2020, 2021, 2023
- Russian Super Cup
  - Winners (9) (record): 2014, 2015, 2016, 2017, 2018, 2018, 2019, 2020, 2021, 2022

== European record ==
Season	Competition	Round	Club	Home leg	Away leg	Aggregate
2021–22	EHF European League	Group Stage; Group B	(France) Nantes	31–35	0–10	6th place
2021–22	EHF European League	Group Stage; Group B	(Germany) Lemgo	28–30	27–30	6th place
2021–22	EHF European League	Group Stage; Group B	(Denmark) GOG	32–39	26–27	6th place
2021–22	EHF European League	Group Stage; Group B	(Portugal) Benfica	27–32	35–38	6th place
2021–22	EHF European League	Group Stage; Group B	(Finland) Cocks	0–10	33–27	6th place

== Team ==
Squad for the 2026–27 season

Goalkeepers

- 12 (Russia) Dmitry Pavlenko
- 16 (Russia) Artem Grushko

Left Wingers

- 2 (Russia) Donat Morozov
- 19 (Russia) Roman Ostrashchenko

Right Wingers

- 14 (Russia) Mikhail Gredasov
- 24 (Russia) Dmitry Kornev

Line players

- 31 (Russia) Victor Futsev
- 42 (Russia) Ivan Mineev
- 55 (Russia) Aleksandr Ermakov

Left Backs

- 15 (Russia) Ivan Shelmenko

Central Backs

- 9 (Russia) Kirill Kotov
- 44 (Russia) Dmitriy Kandybin
- 72 (Russia) Denis Afonin

Right Backs

- 17 (Russia) Aleksandr Kotov
- 93 (Russia) Anton Aksyukov

== Transfers ==
Transfers for the 2026–27 season

Joining

Leaving

== Notable players ==
- (Russia) Pavel Sukosyan
- (Russia) Konstantin Igropulo
- (Russia) Vitali Ivanov
- (Russia) Alexey Kostygov
- (Russia) Alexey Kamanin
- (Russia) Pavel Atman
- (Russia) Sergei Gorbok
- (Russia) Sergei Shelmenko
- (Russia) Oleg Skopintsev
