= HBC CSKA Moscow =

Russian men's handball club

CSKA Moscow
- Full name: Гандбольный Клуб ЦСКА Москва
- Founded: 2020
- Arena: Dynamo Sports Palace
- Capacity: 5,000
- Head coach: Oleg Khodkov
- League: Russian Handball Super League
- 2025-26: 1st
- Club colours

CSKA Moscow (Russian: ЦСКА Москва) is a professional handball club from Moscow, Russia. CSKA is competing in the Russian Handball Super League and in the SEHA League.

In reaction to the 2022 Russian invasion of Ukraine, the International Handball Federation banned Russian athletes, and the European Handball Federation suspended the Russian clubs from competing in European handball competitions.

== Honours ==
- Russian Super League:
  - Winners (3): 2022–23, 2023–24, 2025-26.
  - Finalist (3): 2020–21, 2021–22, 2024-25
- Russian Cup
  - Winners (3): 2024, 2025, 2026.
  - Finalist (2): 2020, 2022
- Russian Super Cup
  - Winners (4): 2023, 2024, 2025, 2026.
  - Finalist (1): 2020

== European competitions ==
Season	Competition	Round	Club	1st leg	2nd leg	Aggregate
2021–22	EHF European League	R1	(Israel) Maccabi Rishon	29–26	29–23	58–49
2021–22	EHF European League	R2	(France) Nîmes	29–36	29–29	58–65

== Team ==
Squad for the 2025–26 season

Goalkeepers

- 1 (Russia) Vadim Bogdanov
- 16 (Russia) Dmitry Kholmov
- 21 (Russia) Vyacheslav Loktev

Left Wingers

- 39 (Russia) Egor Kochura
- 55 (Russia) Dmitriy Ionov

Right Wingers

- 10 (Russia) Ivan Erkanov
- 33 (Russia) Daniil Shishkaryov

Line players

- 17 (Russia) Maksim Mikhalin
- 22 (Russia) Vyacheslav Kasatkin
- 77 (Russia) Roman Tsarapkin

Left Backs

- 7 (Belarus) Yulian Hiryk
- 11 (Russia) Aleksandr Grebenkin
- 23 (Russia) Ilya Belevtsov

Central Backs

- 19 (Russia) Vladislav Filimonov
- 27 (Russia) Valentin Vorobev

Right Backs

- 13 (Russia) Daniyl Moskalenko
- 24 (Belarus) Stanislav Shabelnikov
- 90 (Russia) Alexey Kurochkin

=== Transfers ===
Transfers for the 2026–27 season

Joining

- (Russia) Igor Karlov (CB) from (Slovakia) HT Tatran Prešov

Leaving

=== Transfer History ===
Transfers for the 2025–26 season

Joining

- (Russia) Dmitry Kholmov (GK) from (France) Grand Besançon Doubs Handball
- (Russia) Daniyl Moskalenko (RB) from ( (France) Chambéry Savoie Mont-Blanc Handball)
- (Russia) Maksim Mikhalin (LP) from ( (Hungary) Budakalász FKC)

Leaving

- (Russia) Sergey Ivanov (RB) to (Serbia) RK Partizan
- (Russia) Aleksei Fokin (RW) to (Belarus) HC Meshkov Brest
- (Russia) Nikita Nikulin (GK) to ( (Israel) Maccabi Rishon LeZion)
- (Belarus) Artur Rudz (LB) to ( (Belarus) HC Meshkov Brest)
- (Belarus) Aliaksandr Bachko (CB) (end of loan at (Belarus) MOHK)
- (Russia) Andrei Korkin (LP)
- (Russia) Kirill Kremnev (LP)
