= Russian Handball Super League =

- Founded: 1993
- No. of teams: 13
- Country: Russia
- Confederation: EHF (Europe)
- Most recent champions: HBC CSKA Moscow (3d title)
- Most titles: Chekhovskiye Medvedi (21st titles)

The Russian Handball Super League (RHSL) is the top men's professional team handball league in Russia. The league was founded in 1993 as the successor to the Soviet Men's Handball Championship after the dissolution of the Soviet Union.

In reaction to the 2022 Russian invasion of Ukraine, the International Handball Federation banned Russian and Belarus athletes and officials, and the European Handball Federation suspended the national teams of Russia and Belarus as well as Russian and Belarusian clubs competing in European handball competitions. Referees, officials, and commission members from Russia and Belarus will not be called upon for future activities. And new organisers will be sought for the YAC 16 EHF Beach Handball EURO and the Qualifier Tournaments for the Beach Handball EURO 2023, which were to be held in Moscow.

== Champions by year ==
Season	(gold) Gold	(silver) Silver	(bronze) Bronze
1992–93	Neva (1)	Polyot Chelyabinsk (1)	CSKA Moscow (1)
1993–94	CSKA Moscow (1)	Kaustik Volgograd (1)	Polyot Chelyabinsk (1)
1994–95	CSKA Moscow (2)	Kaustik Volgograd (2)	Dynamo Astrakhan (1)
1995–96	Kaustik Volgograd (1)	Polyot Chelyabinsk (2)	CSKA Moscow (2)
1996–97	Kaustik Volgograd (2)	Polyot Chelyabinsk (3)	CSKA Moscow (3)
1997–98	Kaustik Volgograd (3)	Istochnik Rostov-on-Don (1)	SKIF Krasnodar (1)
1998–99	Kaustik Volgograd (4)	Lukoil-Dynamo Astrakhan (1)	Polyot Chelyabinsk (2)
1999–00	CSKA-SportAkadem Moscow (3)	Kaustik Volgograd (3)	Lukoil-Dynamo Astrakhan (2)
2000–01	CSKA-SportAkadem Moscow (4)	Lukoil-Dynamo Astrakhan (2)	Energia Voronezh (1)
2001–02	Chekhovskiye Medvedi (1)	Lukoil-Dynamo Astrakhan (3)	Energia Voronezh (2)
2002–03	Chekhovskiye Medvedi (2)	Lukoil-Dynamo Astrakhan (4)	Chekhovskiye Medvedi II (1)
2003–04	Chekhovskiye Medvedi (3)	Lukoil-Dynamo Astrakhan (5)	Chekhovskiye Medvedi II (2)
2004–05	Chekhovskiye Medvedi (4)	Lukoil-Dynamo Astrakhan (6)	Stepan Razin – Neva (1)
2005–06	Chekhovskiye Medvedi (5)	Lukoil-Dynamo Astrakhan (7)	SKIF Krasnodar (2)
2006–07	Chekhovskiye Medvedi (6)	Lukoil-Dynamo Astrakhan (8)	Kaustik Volgograd (1)
2007–08	Chekhovskiye Medvedi (7)	Zarya Kaspiya (9)	Kaustik Volgograd (2)
2008–09	Chekhovskiye Medvedi (8)	Kaustik Volgograd (4)	SKIF Krasnodar (3)
2009–10	Chekhovskiye Medvedi (9)	Universitet Lesgafta – Neva (1)	Kaustik Volgograd (3)
2010–11	Chekhovskiye Medvedi (10)	Universitet Lesgafta – Neva (2)	Kaustik Volgograd (4)
2011–12	Chekhovskiye Medvedi (11)	Universitet Lesgafta – Neva (3)	Sungul Snezhinsk (1)
2012–13	Chekhovskiye Medvedi (12)	Universitet Lesgafta – Neva (4)	SKIF Krasnodar (4)
2013–14	Chekhovskiye Medvedi (13)	Universitet Lesgafta – Neva (5)	Permskie Medvedi (1)
2014–15	Chekhovskiye Medvedi (14)	Permskie Medvedi (1)	Universitet Lesgafta – Neva (2)
2015–16	Chekhovskiye Medvedi (15)	Permskie Medvedi (2)	Universitet Lesgafta – Neva (3)
2016–17	Chekhovskiye Medvedi (16)	Universitet Lesgafta – Neva (6)	SKIF Krasnodar (5)
2017–18	Chekhovskiye Medvedi (17)	Spartak Moscow (1)	Universitet Lesgafta – Neva (4)
2018–19	Chekhovskiye Medvedi (18)	Spartak Moscow (2)	Universitet Lesgafta – Neva (5)
2019–20	Chekhovskiye Medvedi (19)	Dinamo Viktor Stavropol (1)	Universitet Lesgafta – Neva (6)
2020–21	Chekhovskiye Medvedi (20)	HBC CSKA Moscow (1)	Dinamo Viktor Stavropol (1)
2021–22	Chekhovskiye Medvedi (21)	HBC CSKA Moscow (2)	Universitet Lesgafta – Neva (7)
2022–23	HBC CSKA Moscow (1)	Permskie Medvedi (3)	Chekhovskiye Medvedi (1)
2023–24	HBC CSKA Moscow (2)	Chekhovskiye Medvedi (1)	HC Zenit Saint Petersburg (8)
2024–25	HC Zenit Saint Petersburg (2)	HBC CSKA Moscow (3)	Chekhovskiye Medvedi (2)
2025–26	HBC CSKA Moscow (3)	HC Zenit Saint Petersburg (7)	Permskie Medvedi (2)

== 2026-27 Season participants ==
The following 12 clubs compete in the championship during the 2026–27 season.

Team	City	Arena	Address
Chekhovskiye Medvedi	Chekhov	Olimpiysky Sport Palace	Chekhov, Poligrafistov str., 30
HBC CSKA Moscow	Moscow	Dynamo Sports Palace	Moscow, Lavochkina str., 32
Saint Petersburg HC	Saint Petersburg	Yubileyny Sports Palace	Saint-Petersburg, Dobrolyubova av., 18
GK Permskie Medvedi	Perm	V.P. Sukharev Sport Complex	Perm, Kosmonavtov Hwy., 158A/1
Dinamo Viktor Stavropol	Stavropol	Vostok-Arena	Stavropol, Dostoyevskogo str., 54
Dynamo Astrakhan	Astrakhan	Sportcomplex "Zvezdniy"	Astrakhan, Pushkina str., 28
SKIF Krasnodar	Krasnodar	Palace of Sports Olimp	Krasnodar, Beregovaya str., 44
Sungul Snezhinsk	Snezhinsk	Snezhinsk	Snezhinsk, 40 Let Okryabrya str., 15
SGAU-Saratov	Saratov	Proton-Arena	Saratov, S.F. Tarkhov Street, 64
GK Ak Bars	Kazan	Bustan	Kazan, Professor Nuzhin Drive, 1
HC Kaustik Volgograd	Volgograd	Molodezhnyy	Volgograd, Molodozhnaya str., 35
MUOR-AKADEMIYA	Moscow	MGA	Moscow, Skhodnenskaya str., 15
