= SKIF Krasnodar =

- Full name: Спортивный клуб института физкультуры
- Nickname: Thunderbird
- Founded: 1963
- Arena: Palace of Sports Olimp, Krasnodar, Russia
- Capacity: 3,000
- Head coach: Stepan Sidorchuk
- League: Russian Handball Super League
- 2025-26: 7th

SKIF Krasnodar (russian: СКИФ Краснода́р) is a team handball club from Krasnodar, Russia. SKIF Krasnodar competes in the Russian Handball Super League.

== History ==
The club was established in Krasnodar, in the distant 1963, and at different times called the "Thunderbird", "University", "Skif", "Arcadia SKIF", "SKIF-Rosneft", "SKIF- Kuban". The first team coach was honored coach of Russia Vitaly Sorokin. Professional status of the team received in 1964, in the major league championship of the USSR.

In reaction to the 2022 Russian invasion of Ukraine, the International Handball Federation banned Russian athletes, and the European Handball Federation suspended the Russian clubs from competing in European handball competitions.

== Accomplishments ==
- Russian Cup:
  - 2017
- Soviet Union Handball League:
  - 1991, 1992
- EHF Cup:
  - 1990
- Limburgse Handbal Dagen
  - 1990

== Team ==
=== Current squad ===
Squad for the 2026–27 season

Goalkeepers

- 17 (Russia) Alexey Krikunov
- 89 (Russia) Andrey Burka
- 97 (Belarus) Ihar Chernikau

Left Wingers

- 44 (Russia) Vet Chan Suan
- 80 (Russia) Ivan Osadchiy

Right Wingers

- 27 (Russia) Ilia Ivannikov
- 29 (Russia) Ivan Pasenov

Line players

- 9 (Russia) Pavel Maksimov
- 11 (Russia) Maksim Mikhalin
- 14 (Russia) Vladimir Utka
- 71 (Russia) Gleb Chernov

Left Backs

- 30 (Hungary) Iman Jamali
- 46 (Russia) Daniil Gurin

Central Backs

- 23 (Russia) Artem Shaiduka
- 31 (Russia) Nikita Palishchev
- 66 (Iran) Sajjad Esteki

Right Backs

- 13 (Russia) Ruslan Dashko

== Transfers ==
Transfers for the season 2026–27

Joining

- (Belarus) Ihar Chernikau (GK) (from (Israel) Bnei Herzliya)
- (Russia) Maksim Mikhalin (P) (from (Russia) HBC CSKA Moscow)
- (Russia) Pavel Maksimov (P) (from (Russia) Dinamo Viktor Stavropol)

Leaving

- (Russia) Vadim Kondratenko (GK) (to (Russia) Sungul Snezhinsk)
- (Russia) Viktor Dolinin (LB) (to (Russia) Sungul Snezhinsk)
- (Russia) Ilya Galtsov (CB) (to (Russia) SGAU-Saratov)
- (Russia) Saveliy Shalabanov (CB) (to (Russia) Saint Petersburg HC)
- (Russia) Denis Golovnya (P) (to (Russia) Sungul Snezhinsk)
