= HC Kaustik Volgograd =

Russian handball team

- Full name: HC Kaustik Volgograd
- Founded: 1976
- President: Dmitri Borodachyov
- Head coach: Dmitri Bocharnikov
- League: Russian Handball Super League
- 2024-25: 11th (relegated)
Home	Away

HC Kaustik Volgograd (Russian: Гандбольный клуб Каустик Волгоград) is a Russian handball team located in Volgograd. They compete in the Russian Handball Super League.

== History ==
The club was founded in 1976 and four years later they were promoted to the Soviet top league. Their best position in the Soviet league was a 6th place. After the establishment of the Russian Handball Super League, the team started seeing better results, and after finishing second in 1994 and 1995, they won their first Championship in 1996. They followed it up by winning four Russian Championships in a row, but they have not won the Championship since.

In reaction to the 2022 Russian invasion of Ukraine, the International Handball Federation banned Russian athletes, and the European Handball Federation suspended the Russian clubs from competing in European handball competitions.

In the 2024-25 season they were relegated from the Super League, after finishing 11th and losing the relegation playoff.

== Accomplishments ==
- Russian Handball Super League:
  - Winners (4) : 1996, 1997, 1998, 1999
