= Sungul Snezhinsk =

- Full name: Sungul Snezhinsk
- Founded: 1990
- Head coach: Dmitrii Karlov
- League: Russian Handball Super League
- 2025-26: 5th
| Home | Away |

Sungul Snezhinsk, formerly known as Sungul Chelyabinsk is a Russian handball team located in Snezhinsk. They compete in the Russian Handball Super League.

In reaction to the 2022 Russian invasion of Ukraine, the International Handball Federation banned Russian athletes, and the European Handball Federation suspended the Russian clubs from competing in European handball competitions.

== Accomplishments ==
- Russian Handball Super League:
  - Third Place : 2012

== Team ==
Squad for the 2026–27 season

Goalkeepers

- 16 (Russia) Vadim Kondratenko
- 30 (Russia) Vladislav Martynenko

Left wingers

- 74 (Russia) Stepan Ermakov

Right wingers

- 14 (Russia) Ivan Kharitonov
- 31 (Russia) Pavel Demakov

Line players

- 18 (Russia) Kirill Glebov
- 33 (Russia) Denis Golovnya

Left backs

- 8 (Russia) Vladimir Merkulov
- 77 (Russia) Pavel Bulkin
- 88 (Russia) Viktor Dolinin
- 93 (Russia) Alexey Paveliev

Central backs

- 4 (Russia) Pavel Kungurov
- 27 (Russia) Dmitrii Kalugin

Right backs

- 13 (Russia) Vitaly Ryzhov
- 20 (Russia) Evgeny Dudik

=== Transfers ===
Transfers for the 2026–27 season

Joining

Leaving
