= Soviet Men's Handball Championship =

Men's club handball league

- Founded: 1956 (Field Handball); 1962 (Indoor Handball)
- Folded: 1992
- Country: Soviet Union
- Confederation: EHF (Europe)
- Last champion: SKIF Krasnodar (2nd title)
- Most titles: CSKA Moscow (9 titles)
- Level on pyramid: 1
- International cups: Champions League; EHF Cup

The Soviet Union Handball Championship was the highest level for men's club handball in the Union of Soviet Socialist Republics.

The competition was successively dominated by three clubs: CSKA Moscow and its nine titles, including eight between 1973 and 1983 succeeded by MAI Moscow and its seven titles between 1965 and 1975 and then comes the dominance of SKA Minsk and its six titles, including five between 1984 and 1989. These three clubs are also the only three to have won the European Cup of Champion Clubs (respectively two, one and three times).

== Field Handball ==
In this list is the first Soviet Union Field Handball Championship played with 11 players :

Season	Champions
1955/56	MVO Moscow
1956/57	Burevestnik Kiev
1957/58	OSZK Odessa
1958/59	SKIF Lviv
1959/60	MAI Moscow
1960/61	Trud Moscow

=== Winners List Since 1962 Indoor Handball ===
Season	Champions	Runners-up	Third Place
1962	Burevestnik Tbilissi	Komanda Tiraspol	Atletas Kaunas
1963	Atletas Kaunas (1)	ZAS Zaporizhzhia	Burevestnik Tbilissi
1964	Burevestnik Tbilissi (2)	ZAS Zaporizhzhia	SK Kountsevo Moscow
1965	MAI Moscow	Burevestnik Tbilissi	ZAS Zaporizhzhia
1966	SK Kountsevo Moscow	Burevestnik Tbilissi	Žalgiris Kaunas
1967	SK Kountsevo Moscow	Burevestnik Tbilissi	Daugava Riga
1968	MAI Moscow	SK Kountsevo Moscow	ZAS Zaporizhzhia
1969	SK Kountsevo Moscow (3)	MAI Moscow	Krasnodar University
1970	MAI Moscow	SK Kountsevo Moscow	Krasnodar University
1971	MAI Moscow	ZMetI Zaporizhzhia	Krasnodar University
1972	MAI Moscow	SK Kountsevo Moscow	ZMetI Zaporizhzhia
1973	CSKA Moscow	MAI Moscow	SK Kountsevo Moscow
1974	MAI Moscow	CSKA Moscow	ZMetI Zaporizhzhia
1975	MAI Moscow (7)	CSKA Moscow	ZMetI Zaporizhzhia
1976	CSKA Moscow	MAI Moscow	SK Kountsevo Moscow
1977	CSKA Moscow	MAI Moscow	Burevestnik Tbilissi
1978	CSKA Moscow	MAI Moscow	SK Kountsevo Moscow
1979	CSKA Moscow	MAI Moscow	Granitas Kaunas
1980	CSKA Moscow	MAI Moscow	Burevestnik Tbilissi
1981	SKA Minsk	Granitas Kaunas	Burevestnik Tbilissi
1982	CSKA Moscow	SKA Minsk	ZII Zaporizhzhia
1983	CSKA Moscow	SKA Minsk	ZII Zaporizhzhia
1984	SKA Minsk	CSKA Moscow	ZII Zaporizhzhia
1985	SKA Minsk	Granitas Kaunas	CSKA Moscow
1986	SKA Minsk	CSKA Moscow	Granitas Kaunas
1987	CSKA Moscow (9)	SKA Minsk	MAI Moscow
1988	SKA Minsk	CSKA Moscow	SKIF Krasnodar
1989	SKA Minsk (6)	Dinamo Astrakhan	SKIF Krasnodar
1990	Dinamo Astrakhan (1)	SKA Minsk	SKIF Krasnodar
1991	SKIF Krasnodar	Dinamo Astrakhan	SKA Minsk
1992 •	SKIF Krasnodar (2)	SKA Minsk	Dinamo Astrakhan

• The 1991/92 Championship is Officially of the Commonwealth of Independent States.
