= Dynamo Astrakhan =

Russian handball club

Zarja Kaspija Astrakhan
- Full name: Zarja Kaspija Astrakhan
- Founded: 1978; 48 years ago
- Arena: Sportcomplex "Zvezdniy"
- Capacity: 1500
- President: Valery Prozorovskii
- League: Russian Handball Super League
- 2024-25: 8th
- Club colours
Home	Away

Zarja Kaspija Astrakhan, also known as Dinamo Astrakhan, is a Russian handball team located in Astrakhan. Their home matches are played at the Sports Complex Star. They compete in the Russian Handball Super League.

In reaction to the 2022 Russian invasion of Ukraine, the International Handball Federation banned Russian athletes, and the European Handball Federation suspended the Russian clubs from competing in European handball competitions.

== Accomplishments ==
- Soviet League:
  - Winners (1) : 1990
- Russian Handball Super League:
  - Runners Up (8) : 2001, 2002, 2003, 2004, 2005, 2006, 2007, 2008
- EHF Champions League:
  - Semifinalist (1) : 1991
- EHF Cup:
  - Runner-Up (1) : 2003

== European record ==
Season	Competition	Round	Club	1st leg	2nd leg	Aggregate
2016–17	EHF Cup	R1	(Serbia) RK Metaloplastika	30–24	17–20	47–44
2016–17	EHF Cup	R2	(Slovakia) HC Sporta Hlohovec	33–29	27–20	60–49
2016–17	EHF Cup	R3	(Denmark) HC Midtjylland	29–29	26–35	55–64

== Team ==
=== Current squad ===
Squad for the 2026–27 season

Goalkeepers

- 1 (Russia) Dmitry Koryakin
- 12 (Russia) Ilya Ivanov
- 96 (Russia) Aleksandr Lysenko

Left Wingers

- 2 (Russia) Albert Gumarov
- 13 (Russia) Stanislav Tekutyev
- 99 (Russia) Egor Motorin

Right Wingers

- 47 (Russia) Rufat Mukhtarov
- 51 (Russia) Dmitrij Chernecov

Line players

- 6 (Russia) Andrey Klimentiev
- 24 (Russia) Svyatoslav Krivich
- 37 (Russia) Denis Vasilev

Left Back

- 3 (Russia) Aleksandr Tyumentsev
- 34 (Russia) Dmitrii Shelestiukov

Centre Back

- 23 (Russia) Vladzimir Nemtsev
- 32 (Russia) Pavel Filchev

Right Back

- 4 (Russia) Alexey Koval
- 28 (Russia) Dmitrii Frolov
