= 2021–22 Swiss Handball League =

Swiss Handball League
- Season: 2021–22
- Dates: 2 September 2021 – 7 June 2022
- Champion: Kadetten Schaffhausen; 12th title
- Relegated: Chênois Genève
- European League: Kadetten Schaffhausen; GC Amicitia Zürich
- European Cup: Pfadi Winterthur; Wacker Thun

The 2021–22 Swiss Handball League (known as the Quickline Handball League for sponsorship reasons) was the 73rd season of the Handball League, Swiss premier handball league. It ram from 2 September 2021 to 7 June 2022.

Kadetten Schaffhausen won their twelfth title.

== Teams ==
Locations of the 2021–22 Swiss Handball League

=== Arenas and locations ===
The following 14 clubs competed in the Slovenian First League during the 2021–22 season:

Team	Location	Arena	Capacity
BSV Bern	Bern, Muri	Mobiliar Arena	2,000
Chênois Genève	Geneva	Sports Center Sous-Moulin	
GC Amicitia Zürich	Zürich	Saalsporthalle	2,300
Kadetten Schaffhausen	Schaffhausen	BBC Arena	3,500
Kriens-Luzern	Luzern	Krauerhalle	1,300
Pfadi Winterthur	Winterthur	AXA-Arena	2,000
RTV Basel	Basel	Rankhof	1,500
Suhr Aarau	Aarau	Sporthalle Schachen	1,000
St. Otmar	St. Gallen	Kreuzbleiche	3,500
Wacker Thun	Thun	Sporthalle Lachen	2,000

== Regular season ==
=== League table ===
Pos	Team	Pld	W	D	L	GF	GA	GD	Pts	PPG	Qualification
1	Kadetten Schaffhausen	25	22	2	1	762	601	+161	46	1.84	Qualification to Playoffs
2	Pfadi Winterthur	26	15	3	8	751	693	+58	33	1.27	Qualification to Playoffs
3	Wacker Thun	27	14	3	10	749	727	+22	31	1.15	Qualification to Playoffs
4	HSC Suhr Aarau	26	13	3	10	685	645	+40	29	1.12	Qualification to Playoffs
5	GC Amicitia Zürich	27	13	1	13	735	722	+13	27	1.00	Qualification to Playoffs
6	HC Kriens-Luzern	26	11	4	11	704	692	+12	26	1.00	Qualification to Playoffs
7	TSV St. Otmar St. Gallen	26	12	2	12	761	773	−12	26	1.00	Qualification to Playoffs
8	BSV Bern	27	12	1	14	738	744	−6	25	0.93	Qualification to Playoffs
9	RTV 1879 Basel	27	8	3	16	648	707	−59	19	0.70	Qualification to Playout
10	Chênois Genève	27	1	0	26	639	867	−228	2	0.07	Qualification to Playout

Source: Swiss Handball Association
Rules for classification: 1) points per game; 2) goal difference; 3) head-to-head points; 4) goals scored; 5) head-to-head goal difference; 6) head-to-head number of goals scored.

== Playoffs ==
All three rounds of the playoffs were played in a best-of-five format, with the higher seeded team playing the first, third and fifth (if it was necessary) game at home.

Quarterfinals
1	Kadetten Schaffhausen	3
8	BSV Bern	1
4	HSC Suhr Aarau	1
5	GC Amicitia Zürich	3
2	Pfadi Winterthur	3
7	TSV St. Otmar St. Gallen	2
3	Wacker Thun	3
6	HC Kriens-Luzern	0

Semifinals
1	Kadetten Schaffhausen	3
5	GC Amicitia Zürich	0
2	Pfadi Winterthur	3
3	Wacker Thun	2

Finals
1	Kadetten Schaffhausen	3
2	Pfadi Winterthur	0

=== Quarterfinals ===
Team 1	Series	Team 2	Game 1	Game 2	Game 3	Game 4	Game 5
Kadetten Schaffhausen	3–1	BSV Bern	31–30	40–28	32–33	38–28	–
Pfadi Winterthur	3–2	TSV St. Otmar St. Gallen	31–30	34–35 (aet)	32–25	27–31	32–31
Wacker Thun	3–0	HC Kriens-Luzern	25–24	31–28	29–27	–	–
HSC Suhr Aarau	1–3	GC Amicitia Zürich	22–30	27–23	27–28 (aet)	28–23	–

=== Semifinals ===
Team 1	Series	Team 2	Game 1	Game 2	Game 3	Game 4	Game 5
Kadetten Schaffhausen	3–0	GC Amicitia Zürich	34–29	33–32	28–21	–	–
Pfadi Winterthur	3–2	Wacker Thun	33–26	29–33	27–19	24–31	28–23

=== Finals ===
Team 1	Series	Team 2	Game 1	Game 2	Game 3	Game 4	Game 5
Kadetten Schaffhausen	3–0	Pfadi Winterthur	30–19	28–20	29–26	–	–

==== Game 1 ====
2 June 2022; 18:00	Kadetten Schaffhausen	30–19	Pfadi Winterthur	BBC-Arena, Schaffhausen; Attendance: 1,500; Referees: H. Simon, M. Simon
2 June 2022; 18:00	Zehnder 7	(15–10)	Jud 5	BBC-Arena, Schaffhausen; Attendance: 1,500; Referees: H. Simon, M. Simon
2 June 2022; 18:00	5× (suspension)	Report	6× (suspension)	BBC-Arena, Schaffhausen; Attendance: 1,500; Referees: H. Simon, M. Simon

==== Game 2 ====
5 June 2022; 17:00	Pfadi Winterthur	20–28	Kadetten Schaffhausen	AXA Arena, Winterthur; Attendance: 2,000; Referees: Capoccia, Jucker
5 June 2022; 17:00	three players 4	(10–11)	Schelker 6	AXA Arena, Winterthur; Attendance: 2,000; Referees: Capoccia, Jucker
5 June 2022; 17:00	1× (yellow card) 5× (suspension) 1× (red card)	Report	1× (yellow card) 5× (suspension)	AXA Arena, Winterthur; Attendance: 2,000; Referees: Capoccia, Jucker

==== Game 3 ====
7 June 2022; 18:00	Kadetten Schaffhausen	29–26	Pfadi Winterthur	BBC-Arena, Schaffhausen; Attendance: 2,473; Referees: Boshkoski, Stalder
7 June 2022; 18:00	Zehnder 5	(16–10)	Sidorowicz 8	BBC-Arena, Schaffhausen; Attendance: 2,473; Referees: Boshkoski, Stalder
7 June 2022; 18:00	1× (yellow card) 3× (suspension)	Report	1× (yellow card) 6× (suspension)	BBC-Arena, Schaffhausen; Attendance: 2,473; Referees: Boshkoski, Stalder

Kadetten Schaffhausen won the Finals, 3–0 on series.

== Playout ==
The playout were played in a best-of-five format, with the higher seeded team playing the first, third and fifth (if it was necessary) game at home.

Team 1	Series	Team 2	Game 1	Game 2	Game 3	Game 4	Game 5
RTV 1879 Basel	3–0	Chênois Genève	25–14	26–21	29–25	–	–

RTV 1879 Basel won 3–0 on series and retained their Swiss Handball League spot, Chênois Genève was relegated to the Nationalliga B.

== Final standings ==
Pos	Team	Pld	W	D	L	Qualification or relegation
1	Kadetten Schaffhausen (C)	35	31	2	2	Qualification for European League group phase
2	Pfadi Winterthur	39	21	4	14	Qualification for European Cup second qualifying round
3	Wacker Thun	35	19	3	13	Qualification for European Cup second qualifying round
4	GC Amicitia Zürich	31	15	2	14	Qualification for European League first qualifying round
5	HSC Suhr Aarau	30	14	4	12	
6	HC Kriens-Luzern	29	11	4	14	
7	TSV St. Otmar St. Gallen	31	13	3	15	
8	BSV Bern	31	13	1	17	
9	RTV 1879 Basel	30	11	3	16	
10	Chênois Genève (R)	30	1	0	29	Relegation to Nationalliga B

Source: Swiss Handball Association
(C) Champions; (R) Relegated

== See also ==
- 2021–22 Swiss Cup
