= 2016–17 Swiss Handball League =

Nationalliga A
- Season: 2016–17
- Champions: Kadetten Schaffhausen (10th title)
- Top goalscorer: Csaszar Gabor (215 goals)
- All statistics correct as of 5 June 2017.

The 2016–17 Nationalliga A (NLA) was the 68th season of the Swiss Handball League, Swiss's top-tier handball league. A total of ten teams contest this season's league, which began on 31 August 2016 and is scheduled to conclude in May 2017.

Kadetten Schaffhausen were the defending champions, having beaten Wacker Thun 3–2 in the previous season's playoff finals.

== Format ==
The competition format for the 2016–17 season consists of two phases, both played in a home-and-away double round-robin system. The first six teams qualifies for a first play-off round, while the last four plays relegation round. At the end of this second round, the first four teams of the play-off round plays elimination rounds.

== Teams ==
2016–17 Nationalliga A teams

The following 10 clubs compete in the Nationalliga A during the 2016–17 season. Lakers Stäfa was relegated from the previous season and HSC Suhr Aarau was promoted from 2015-16 Nationalliga B.

Team	City	Arena
BSV Bern Muri	Bern	Sporthalle Moos Gümligen
GC Amicitia Zürich	Zürich	Saalsporthalle
HC Kriens-Luzern	Kriens	Krauerhalle
HSC Suhr Aarau	Aarau	Schachenhalle
Kadetten Schaffhausen	Schaffhausen	BBC-Arena
Pfadi Winterthur	Winterthur	Eulachhalle
RTV 1879 Basel	Basel	Basel Rankhof
TSV Fortitudo Gossau	Gossau SG	Sporthalle Buchenwald
TSV St. Otmar St. Gallen	St. Gallen	Kreuzbleiche-Halle
Wacker Thun	Thun	Sporthalle Lachen

== First phase ==
=== Standings ===
Pos	Team	Pld	W	D	L	GF	GA	GD	Pts	Qualification
1	Kadetten Schaffhausen	18	15	0	3	554	492	+62	30	Play-off Group
2	Pfadi Winterthur	18	12	2	4	481	425	+56	26	Play-off Group
3	HC Kriens-Luzern	18	12	1	5	498	455	+43	25	Play-off Group
4	Wacker Thun	18	11	1	6	502	444	+58	23	Play-off Group
5	BSV Bern Muri	18	7	3	8	468	458	+10	17	Play-off Group
6	HSC Suhr Aarau	18	8	1	9	441	453	−12	17	Play-off Group
7	TSV St. Otmar St. Gallen	18	7	1	10	487	534	−47	15	Relegation Group
8	GC Amicitia Zürich	18	5	3	10	486	489	−3	13	Relegation Group
9	RTV 1879 Basel	18	4	2	12	429	515	−86	10	Relegation Group
10	TSV Fortitudo Gossau	18	1	2	15	467	548	−81	4	Relegation Group

Updated to match(es) played on 5 June 2017. Source: Swiss Handball League

=== Results ===
Home \ Away	AAR	BAS	BER	GOS	KRI	SCH	STG	THU	WIN	ZUR
HSC Suhr Aarau		19–19	22–23	28–25	27–19	27–29	27–29	23–22	21–22	33–30
RTV 1879 Basel	35–24		22–33	25–25	19–31	30–27	26–32	26–30	25–31	25–24
BSV Bern Muri	23–24	31–18		28–28	19–27	30–31	29–20	23–28	25–24	21–21
TSV Fortitudo Gossau	25–27	24–23	24–28		31–32	25–32	30–31	25–31	16–19	24–37
HC Kriens-Luzern	23–19	30–26	29–24	41–28		33–27	25–23	28–29	27–25	28–28
Kadetten Schaffhausen	24–33	34–19	31–26	38–33	32–23		35–26	28–22	29–26	30–29
TSV St. Otmar St. Gallen	25–21	27–30	29–36	33–29	24–22	28–37		27–34	27–27	35–29
Wacker Thun	31–16	39–21	29–22	35–21	20–27	30–32	27–20		22–22	31–28
Pfadi Winterthur	27–19	30–23	24–20	32–31	29–25	23–24	34–27	30–20		26–19
GC Amicitia Zürich	22–31	24–17	27–27	28–23	25–28	29–34	36–24	25–22	25–30	

Legend: Blue = home team win; Yellow = draw; Red = away team win.

== Second phase ==
The points obtained during the regular season were kept for this second phase.

=== Play-off group ===
Pos	Team	Pld	W	D	L	GF	GA	GD	Pts	Qualification	SCH	WIN	KRI	THU	BER	AAR
1	Kadetten Schaffhausen	28	21	2	5	849	757	+92	44	Play-offs		26–30	32–21	30–29	38–30	31–17
2	Pfadi Winterthur	28	20	3	5	755	656	+99	43	Play-offs	28–30		30–22	23–19	29–20	25–24
3	HC Kriens-Luzern	28	17	1	10	748	724	+24	35	Play-offs	29–25	22–33		21–23	30–26	25–23
4	Wacker Thun	28	16	2	10	758	693	+65	34	Play-offs	25–25	21–23	33–28		21–25	32–25
5	BSV Bern Muri	28	9	5	14	720	737	−17	23		30–30	24–30	22–29	28–31		25–25
6	HSC Suhr Aarau	28	8	3	17	663	709	−46	19		26–28	23–23	22–23	21–22	16–22	

Source: Swiss Handball League

=== Relegation group ===
Pos	Team	Pld	W	D	L	GF	GA	GD	Pts	Qualification
1	TSV St. Otmar St. Gallen	30	12	1	17	818	862	−44	25	
2	GC Amicitia Zürich	30	10	4	16	809	825	−16	24	
3	TSV Fortitudo Gossau	30	10	2	18	800	852	−52	22	Relegation Round
4	RTV 1879 Basel	30	8	3	19	755	860	−105	19	Relegation

Source: Swiss Handball League

Home \ Away	STG	ZUR	GOS	BAS	STG	ZUR	GOS	BAS
TSV St. Otmar St. Gallen		25–26	31–29	34–30		40–29	18–27	28–29
GC Amicitia Zürich	26–24		29–30	27–32	28–24		25–31	27–23
TSV Fortitudo Gossau	21–26	19–23		27–22	28–24	30–29		31–20
RTV 1879 Basel	26–29	30–30	29–30		29–28	28–24	28–30	

Source: Swiss Handball League
Legend: Blue = home team win; Yellow = draw; Red = away team win.

== Play-offs ==
Semifinals
1	Kadetten Schaffhausen	30	30	28
4	Wacker Thun	20	29	26
3	HC Kriens-Luzern	30	20	25	22
2	Pfadi Winterthur	21	23	26	25

Final
1	Kadetten Schaffhausen	31	31	30
2	Pfadi Winterthur	18	26	28

== Relegation Round ==
13 May; 16:30	Lakers Stäfa	29–28	TSV Fortitudo Gossau	Frohberg Stäfa, Oetwil am See

20 May; 17:30	TSV Fortitudo Gossau	26–21	Lakers Stäfa	Sporthalle Buchenwald, Gossau SG

TSV Fortitudo Gossau won 54-50 aggregate and stayed in Nationalliga A.
