= 2011–12 Nationalliga A (handball) =

Nationalliga A
- Season: 2011–12
- Champions: Kadetten Schaffhausen
- Champions League: Kadetten Schaffhausen
- European Cup: Wacker Thun Pfadi Winterthur; BSV Bern Muri

In the 2011–12 season of Nationalliga A, the upper division of the Swiss Handball League, the championship was won by Kadetten SH of Schaffhausen, who defeated Wacker Thun in the final.

== Team information ==
2011–12 season

Team	Location	Arena	Capacity
Kadetten SH	Schaffhausen	BBC Arena	3,500
Pfadi Winterthur	Winterthur	Eulachhalle	3,000
Wacker Thun	Thun	Sporthalle Lachen	
HC Kriens-Luzern	Luzern	Krauerhalle	
BSV Bern Muri	Muri bei Bern	Sporthalle Moos	
TSV St. Otmar St. Gallen	St. Gallen	Kreuzbleiche	3,600
Lakers Stäfa	Stäfa	Frohberg	1,000
RTV 1879 Basel	Basel	Rankhof	1,500
GC Amicitia Zürich	Zürich	Saalsporthalle	3,000
Fortitudo Gossau	Gossau	Buechenwald	820
HSC Suhr Aarau	Aarau		
TV Endingen	Endingen		

== League table ==
=== Regular season ===
	Team	P	W	D	L	G+	G−	Diff.	Pts
1	Kadetten SH	22	21	0	1	712	542	+170	42
2	Pfadi Winterthur	22	15	3	4	661	571	+90	33
3	Wacker Thun	22	14	3	5	652	573	+79	31
4	HC Kriens-Luzern	22	12	3	7	616	550	+66	27
5	BSV Bern Muri	22	12	1	9	602	563	+39	25
6	TSV St. Otmar	22	10	3	9	632	632	+0	23
7	Lakers Stäfa	22	9	2	11	638	657	-19	20
8	RTV 1879 Basel	22	8	4	10	583	625	-42	20
9	GC Amicitia Zürich	22	8	2	12	572	623	-51	18
10	Fortitudo Gossau	22	6	1	15	608	670	-62	13
11	HSC Suhr Aarau	22	4	2	16	521	655	-134	10
12	TV Endingen	22	1	0	21	541	677	-136	2

Champion Round
Relegation Round

=== Championship Round ===
	Team	P	W	D	L	G+	G−	Diff.	Pts
1	Kadetten SH	32	29	0	3	1007	803	+204	58
2	Pfadi Winterthur	32	21	3	8	932	819	+113	45
3	Wacker Thun	32	20	3	9	927	845	+82	43
4	BSV Bern Muri	32	16	1	15	855	819	+36	33
5	HC Kriens-Luzern	32	15	3	14	891	859	+32	33
6	TSV St. Otmar	32	13	3	16	900	923	-23	29

Champion Playoff

=== Semifinals ===
Team 1	Score	Team 2
Kadetten SH	3 - 1	BSV Bern Muri
Pfadi Winterthur	1 - 3	Wacker Thun

=== Finals ===
Team 1	Score	Team 2
Kadetten SH	3 - 1	Wacker Thun

17-5-2012	Kadetten SH	30 - 26	Wacker Thun

23-5-2012	Wacker Thun	34 - 29	Kadetten SH

30-5-2012	Kadetten SH	35 - 23	Wacker Thun

1-6-2012	Wacker Thun	28 - 31	Kadetten SH
