= Swiss Men's Handball Cup =

Swiss handball tournament

Tournament information
- Location: Switzerland
- Established: 1980
- Most championships: Kadetten Schaffhausen (11 titles)
- Website: www.handball.ch

Current champion
- Kadetten Schaffhausen

The Swiss Men's Handball Cup or SHV-Cup is a handball tournament in Switzerland. The tournament has run since 1997-98 season, as well as in 1980 and 1981.

The winner qualifies for the Swiss Super Cup.

== Winners ==
Season	Date	Location	Winner	Final - result	2nd place	# of teams
1980	1980-05-31	Aue Sporthalle, Baden, Aargau	TSV St. Otmar St. Gallen	29:20	Grasshopper Club Zürich	14
1981	1981-06-20	Effretikon, Zürich	TSV St. Otmar St. Gallen	17:13	ZMC Amicitia Zürich	14
Not held
1997/98			Pfadi Winterthur	32:25	TSV St. Otmar St. Gallen	
1998/99			Kadetten Schaffhausen	32:25	TV Suhr	
1999/00			TSV St. Otmar St. Gallen	23:19	Wacker Thun	
2000/01			TSV St. Otmar St. Gallen	30:24	Pfadi Winterthur	
2001/02	2002-03-10	Saalsporthalle, Zürich, Zürich	Wacker Thun	27:25	TSV St. Otmar St. Gallen	
2002/03	2003-05-06	Saalsporthalle, Zürich, Zürich	Pfadi Winterthur	34:31	Grasshopper Club Zürich	
2003/04	2004-04-18	Sporthalle Wankdorf, Bern, Bern	Kadetten Schaffhausen	32:24	BSV Bern Muri	
2004/05	2004-12-27	Saalsporthalle, Zürich, Zürich	Kadetten Schaffhausen	34:28	Pfadi Winterthur	
2005/06	2006-03-19	Saalsporthalle, Zürich, Zürich	Wacker Thun	29:28	TV Suhr	
2006/07	2006-12-27	Saalsporthalle, Zürich, Zürich	Kadetten Schaffhausen	24:22	TV Suhr	
2007/08	2008-04-20	Saalsporthalle, Zürich, Zürich	Kadetten SH GCZ	41:38	ZMC Amicitia Zürich	
2008/09	2009-05-17	Sporthalle Moos, Gümligen, Bern	ZMC Amicitia Zürich	45:31	BSV Bern Muri	
2009/10	2010-04-11	Stadthalle, Sursee, Luzern	Pfadi Winterthur	26:23	SG GC Amicitia Zürich	
2010/11	2011-04-17	Stadthalle, Sursee, Luzern	Kadetten Schaffhausen	34:30	BSV Bern Muri	
2011/12	2012-04-15	Stadthalle, Sursee, Luzern	Wacker Thun	29:26	Kadetten Schaffhausen	
2012/13	2013-04-14	Stadthalle Kleinholz, Olten, Solothurn	Wacker Thun	30:26	Kadetten Schaffhausen	
2013/14	2014-05-04	Stadthalle, Sursee, Luzern	Kadetten Schaffhausen	27:22	Pfadi Winterthur	
2014/15	2015-05-10	Stadthalle Kleinholz, Olten, Solothurn	Pfadi Winterthur	26:25	BSV Bern Muri	
2015/16	2016-05-08	Stadthalle, Sursee, Luzern	Kadetten Schaffhausen	32:28	TSV St. Otmar St. Gallen	
2016/17	2017-02-05	Stadthalle Kleinholz, Olten, Solothurn	Wacker Thun	35:26	TV Endingen (NLB)	
2017/18	2017-12-21	Sporthalle Wankdorf, Bern, Bern	Pfadi Winterthur	33:30	BSV Bern Muri	
2018/19	2019-03-17	Mobiliar Arena, Gümligen, Bern	Wacker Thun	30:25	Kadetten Schaffhausen	
2019/20	Cancelled due to the COVID-19 pandemic					
2020/21	2021-05-08	Mobiliar Arena, Gümligen, Bern	Kadetten Schaffhausen	22:21	HC Kriens-Luzern	
2021/22	2022-05-07	Mobiliar Arena, Gümligen, Bern	GC Amicitia Zürich	30:28 n. V.	Pfadi Winterthur	
2022/23	2023-05-06	Mobiliar Arena, Gümligen, Bern	HC Kriens-Luzern	32:30	Kadetten Schaffhausen	
2023/24	2024-04-27	Mobiliar Arena, Gümligen, Bern	Kadetten Schaffhausen	32:30	RTV 1879 Basel (NLB)	70
2024/25	2025-03-01	Mobiliar Arena, Gümligen, Bern	HC Kriens-Luzern	33:32	Wacker Thun	
2025/26	2025-12-28	Pilatus Arena, Kriens, Luzern	Kadetten Schaffhausen	29:26	Pfadi Winterthur	

== See also ==
- Swiss Women's Handball Cup
- Swiss Handball League
