= Edin Bašić =

Bosnian handball player

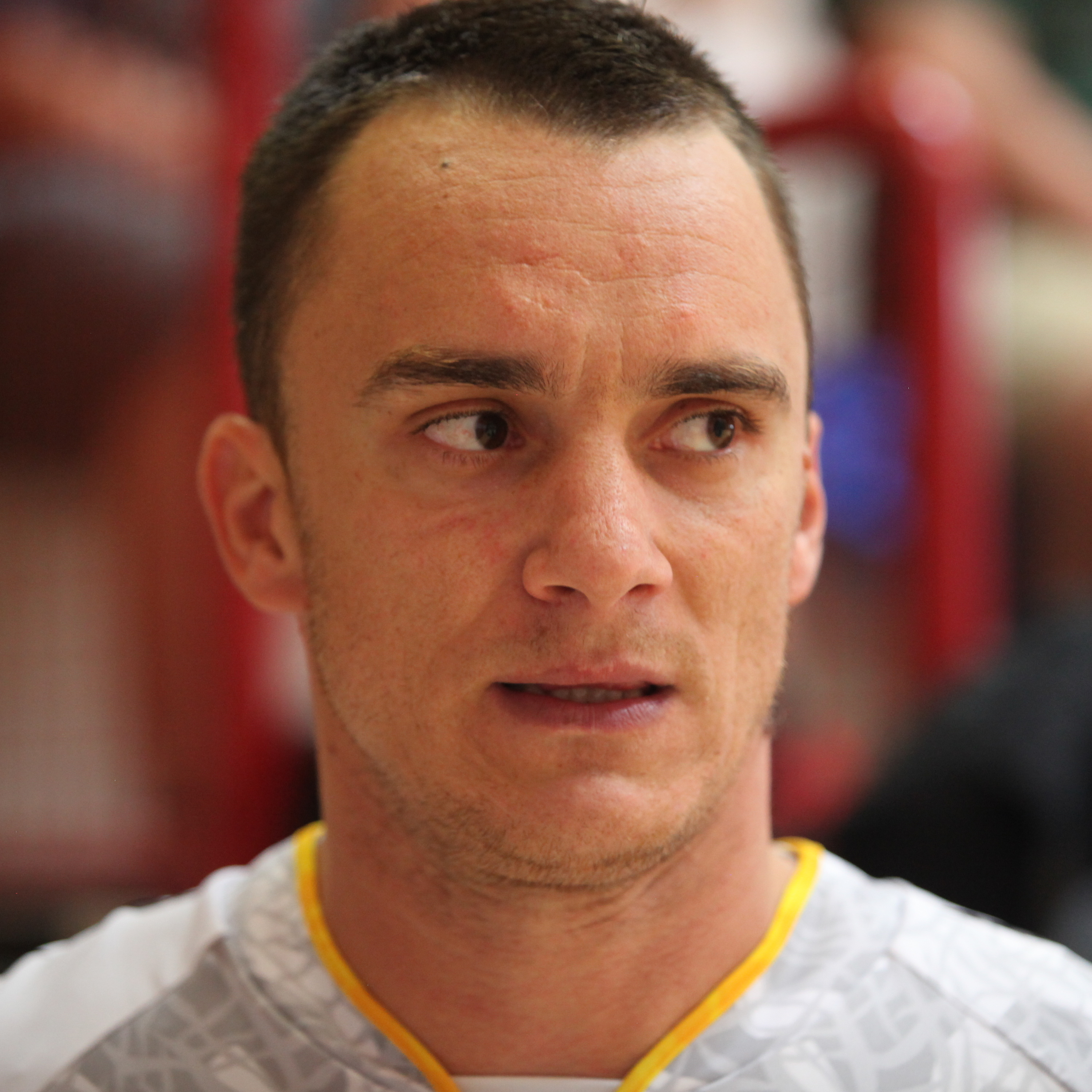

Personal information
- Full name: Edin Bašić
- Nationality: Bosnian
- Born: 4 May 1979 (age 47) Zavidovići, SFR Yugoslavia
- Height: 1.90 m (6 ft 3 in)

Sport
- Sport: Handball
- Position: Centre back
- Current club: Chambéry Savoie Handball
- Number: 13

Youth career
- Years: Team
- –: RK Krivaja

Senior clubs
- Years: Team
- 1996-1999: RK Krivaja
- 1999-2001: Zamet Autotrans
- 2001-2003: TV Endingen
- 2003-2007: TV Suhr
- 2007-2009: GC Amicitia Zurich
- 2009-present: Chambéry
National team
Years	Team	Apps	(Gls)
–	Bosnia and Herzegovina	60	(146)

Edin Bašić (born 4 May 1979 in Zavidovići) is a Bosnian former handball player.

== Early career in Bosnia ==
The right-handed centre back first played for Borac Travnik. With the club he won the domestic championship and cup. In 1998–99 he played his first EHF Champions League season.

== Croatia ==
Soon due to his good performances he caught the eye of Croatian club Zamet Autotrans from Rijeka in 1999.

Bašić quickly established himself as a vital player for the club. He was at the club for two years finishing seventh in the league during his first season and fourth during his second season. RK Zamet reached the Croatian Handball Cup final twice during the time Bašić played for them. He also played the EHF City Cup and EHF Cup Winners' Cup with Zamet.

== Switzerland ==
In 2001 he moved to TV Endingen in Switzerland. He stayed at the club for two years and he then moved to TV Suhr in 2003.

In 2007 he moved to GC Amicitia Zurich. With the club he won the domestic championship twice and the Swiss cup once.

== Chambéry ==
In 2009 Edin Bašić moved to Chambéry Savoie Handball.

In 2015-16 season Bašić and his club reached the semi-final of the EHF Cup where they lost to Frisch Auf Göppingen and BM Granollers.

== Honours ==
Borac Travnik

- BIH First League
  - Winners (1): 1997-98
- BIH Cup
  - Winners (1): 1997

Zamet Autotrans

- Croatian Cup
  - Runner-up (2): 2000, 2001

Zurich

- Swiss League
  - Winner (2): 2007-08, 2008-09
- Swiss Cup
  - Winner (1): 2009
- Swiss Super Cup
  - Winner (1): 2009

Chambéry

- LNH Division 1
  - Runner-up (3): 2009-10, 2010-11, 2011-12,
- Coupe de France (handball)
  - Runner-up (2): 2011, 2014
- Coupe de la Ligue (handball)
  - Runner-up (1): 2011
- Trophée des champions
  - Winner (1): 2013
  - Runner-up (3): 2010, 2011, 2012

Individual

- Topscorer of the NLA 2004-05 and 2005-06
- 6. Place in the overall topscorers in the NLA (1807 goals in 261 games)
- Best left back player of the NLA 2006-07, and 2008-09
- Best foreigners of LNH 2010-11
- Best Playmaker of LNH 2010-11, 2011-12 and 2012-13
