= 2022–23 EHF European Cup =

EHF European Cup
- 2022–23

Tournament information
- Sport: Handball
- Dates: 10 September 2022–4 June 2023
- Teams: 77 (qualification stage); 16 (main stage)
- Website: ehfec.com

Final positions
- Champions: (Serbia) Vojvodina (1st title)
- Runner-up: (Norway) Nærbø IL

Tournament statistics
- Matches played: 30
- Attendance: 27,274 (909 per match)

The 2022–23 EHF European Cup was the 26th season of Europe's tertiary club handball tournament organised by European Handball Federation (EHF), and the 3rd season since it was renamed from the Challenge Cup to the EHF European Cup.

== Qualified teams ==
The full list of teams qualified for each stage of the 2022–23 EHF European Cup was announced on 12 July 2022.

The labels in the parentheses show how each team qualified for the place of its starting round:

- EC: European Cup title holders
- CW: Cup winners
- CR: Cup runners-up
- 4th, 5th, etc.: League position of the previous season
  - SF: Semi-final league position
  - QF: Quarter-final league position

Round 2
(Norway) Nærbø IL ^{EC}	(Croatia) Sesvete (3rd)	(Greece) Olympiacos	(Sweden) Alingsås HK
(Norway) ØIF Arendal	(Czech Republic) HCB Karviná	(Slovenia) Gorenje Velenje (3rd)	(Iceland) KA
(Cyprus) Sabbianco A. Famagusta (1st)	(Luxembourg) Handball Esch	(Switzerland) Pfadi Winterthur (2nd)	(Turkey) Beşiktaş Yurtbay Seramik
(Estonia) Põlva Serviti	(Slovakia) MŠK Považská Bystrica	(Israel) Hapoel Ashdod	(Austria) Förthof UHK Krems
(Ukraine) Donbas Donetsk Region	(Bosnia and Herzegovina) Borac m:tel	(Latvia) ZRHK Tenax Dobele	(Lithuania) Vilnius VHC Sviesa
(Kosovo) KH Besa Famgas (1st)	(Serbia) Vojvodina (1st)	(Finland) BK-46	(Italy) Accademia Conversano 2014
(Netherlands) KRAS/Volendam	(Faroe Islands) H71	(Bulgaria) Lokomotiv Gorna Oryahovitsa	(Azerbaijan) HC Baku
(Belgium) HC Visé BM	(Montenegro) Lovćen Cetinje	(Croatia) Gorica (4th)	(Greece) AEK Athens
(Norway) Runar Sandefjord	(Czech Republic) Talent tym Plzenskeho kraje	(Slovenia) Riko Ribnica (4th)	(Iceland) Haukar
(Cyprus) Parnassos Strovolou	(Luxembourg) Red Boys Differdange	(Switzerland) Wacker Thun (SF)	(Turkey) Beykoz Belediyesi GSK
(Estonia) Viljandi HC	(Israel) AS SGS Ramhat Hashron	(Austria) Bregenz Handball	(Bosnia and Herzegovina) Sloboda Tuzla
(Lithuania) Granitas Kaunas	(Kosovo) Rahoveci	(Serbia) Partizan	(Finland) HIFK Handboll
(Italy) Junior Fasano	(Netherlands) KEMBIT-Lions	(Greece) PAOK	

Round 1
(Czech Republic) HC ROBE Zubří	(Iceland) ÍBV	(Cyprus) APOEL	(Luxembourg) HC Berchem
(Turkey) Spor Toto SK	(Estonia) HC Tallinn	(Israel) Maccabi Rishon LeZion	(Austria) HC Fivers Margareten
(Bosnia and Herzegovina) Izviđač	(Lithuania) Dragūnas Klaipėda	(Kosovo) Kastrioti	(Serbia) Radnički Kragujevac
(Italy) Raimond Sassari	(Netherlands) Drenth Groep Hurry-up	(Greece) AESH Pylaia	(Czech Republic) TJ Sokol Nové Veselí
(Luxembourg) HB Dudelange	(Turkey) İzmir BSB SK	(Israel) HC Holon	(Serbia) Dinamo Pančevo
(Greece) AC Diomidis Argous	(Czech Republic) HC Dukla Prague	(Slovenia) Slovenj Gradec	(Austria) HC Linz AG
(Bosnia and Herzegovina) Gračanica	(Italy) SSV Brixen		

== Qualifying rounds ==
=== Round 1 ===
A total of 26 teams were involved in the first qualifying round. The first leg matches were held on 10–11 September 2022, while the second leg matches were held on 17–18 September 2022. The draw was held in EHF office in Vienna.

Results

Team 1	Agg.	Team 2	1st leg	2nd leg
Kastrioti (Kosovo)	44–72	(Bosnia and Herzegovina) Gračanica	22–36	22–36
Dragūnas Klaipėda (Lithuania)	52–58	(Serbia) Dinamo Pančevo	24–30	28–28
HC Berchem (Luxembourg)	56–61	(Netherlands) Drenth Groep Hurry-up	30–32	26–29
AC Diomidis Argous (Greece)	52–61	(Austria) HC Fivers Margareten	27–30	25–31
Maccabi Rishon LeZion (Israel)	63–65	(Slovenia) Slovenj Gradec	31–27	32–38
HC Dukla Prague (Czech Republic)	55–54	(Serbia) Radnički Kragujevac	31–29	24–25
Raimond Sassari (Italy)	49–53	(Italy) SSV Brixen	29–24	20–29
İzmir BSB SK (Turkey)	56–86	(Czech Republic) HC ROBE Zubří	27–46	29–40
ÍBV (Iceland)	74–67	(Israel) HC Holon	41–35	33–32
AESH Pylaia (Greece)	60–33	(Cyprus) APOEL	33–22	27–11
Spor Toto SK (Turkey)	52–50	(Luxembourg) HB Dudelange	25–26	27–24
TJ Sokol Nové Veselí (Czech Republic)	77–50	(Estonia) HC Tallinn	38–27	39–23
HC Linz AG (Austria)	69–70	(Bosnia and Herzegovina) Izviđač	34–32	35–38

=== Round 2 ===
A total of 64 teams were involved in the second qualifying round, 13 teams advancing from the previous round and 51 teams entering this round. The first leg matches were held on 29–30 October 2022, while the second leg matches were held on 5–6 November 2022. The draw was held in EHF office in Vienna.

Results

Team 1	Agg.	Team 2	1st leg	2nd leg
SSV Brixen (Italy)	50–75	(Serbia) Vojvodina	23–31	27–44
HIFK Handboll (Finland)	60–62	(Kosovo) KH Besa Famgas	28–27	32–35
ØIF Arendal (Norway)	70–46	(Czech Republic) HC ROBE Zubří	34–20	36–26
Handball Esch (Luxembourg)	63–66	(Czech Republic) HC Dukla Prague	31–36	32–30
ZRHK Tenax Dobele (Latvia)	56–57	(Czech Republic) Talent tym Plzenskeho kraje	31–28	25–29
Põlva Serviti (Estonia)	60–54	(Estonia) Viljandi HC	27–26	33–28
Sesvete (Croatia)	56–45	(Greece) PAOK	29–24	27–21
Junior Fasano (Italy)	64–59	(Israel) Hapoel Ashdod	32–33	32–26
Donbas Donetsk Region (Ukraine)	48–81	(Iceland) ÍBV	28–36	20–45
Olympiacos (Greece)	61–43	(Bosnia and Herzegovina) Sloboda Tuzla	34–24	27–19
Vilnius VHC Sviesa (Lithuania)	50–65	(Luxembourg) Red Boys Differdange	28–31	22–34
H71 (Faroe Islands)	51–62	(Serbia) Partizan	21–27	30–35
Nærbø IL (Norway)	58–55	(Slovenia) Slovenj Gradec	29–28	29–27
Gorenje Velenje (Slovenia)	59–55	(Austria) Bregenz Handball	33–30	26–25
Beykoz Belediyesi GSK (Turkey)	49–78	(Sweden) Alingsås HK	28–32	21–46
Förthof UHK Krems (Austria)	68–55	(Greece) AESH Pylaia	34–25	34–30
HC Fivers Margareten (Austria)	59–56	(Iceland) KA	29–30	30–26
Rahoveci (Kosovo)	58–65	(Czech Republic) HCB Karviná	29–33	29–32
Runar Sandefjord (Norway)	63–52	(Montenegro) Lovćen Cetinje	32–21	31–31
Riko Ribnica (Slovenia)	68–49	(Bosnia and Herzegovina) Borac m:tel	40–19	28–30
MŠK Považská Bystrica (Slovakia)	66–61	(Bosnia and Herzegovina) Izviđač	34–25	32–36
HC Visé BM (Belgium)	62–40	(Cyprus) Parnassos Strovolou	38–21	24–19
Granitas Kaunas (Lithuania)	46–58	(Turkey) Beşiktaş Yurtbay Seramik	21–31	25–27
Pfadi Winterthur (Switzerland)	58–61	(Israel) AS SGS Ramhat Hashron	34–30	24–31
AEK Athens (Greece)	60–47	(Netherlands) Drenth Groep Hurry-up	35–30	25–17
KEMBIT-Lions (Netherlands)	78–36	(Bulgaria) Lokomotiv Gorna Oryahovitsa	39–17	39–19
BK-46 (Finland)	80–43	(Turkey) Spor Toto SK	37–20	43–23
KRAS/Volendam (Netherlands)	52–54	(Switzerland) Wacker Thun	27–31	25–23
Gorica (Croatia)	55–51	(Czech Republic) TJ Sokol Nové Veselí	27–25	28–26
Dinamo Pančevo (Serbia)	59–52	(Italy) Accademia Conversano 2014	32–22	27–30
Gračanica (Bosnia and Herzegovina)	70–45	(Azerbaijan) HC Baku	33–17	37–28
Sabbianco A. Famagusta (Cyprus)	62–50	(Iceland) Haukar	26–22	36–28

=== Round 3 ===
A total of 32 teams were involved in the third qualifying round. The first leg matches were held on 3–4 December 2022, while the second leg matches were held on 10–11 December 2022. The draw was held in EHF office in Vienna.

Results

Team 1	Agg.	Team 2	1st leg	2nd leg
Sesvete (Croatia)	59–50	(Kosovo) KH Besa Famgas	31–23	28–27
Dinamo Pančevo (Serbia)	61–55	(Turkey) Beşiktaş Yurtbay Seramik	30–28	31–27
ÍBV (Iceland)	59–65	(Czech Republic) HC Dukla Prague	34–33	25–32
Runar Sandefjord (Norway)	76–66	(Estonia) Põlva Serviti	41–30	35–36
Talent tym Plzenskeho kraje (Czech Republic)	61–73	(Israel) AS SGS Ramhat Hashron	28–39	33–34
Förthof UHK Krems (Austria)	27–39	(Serbia) Vojvodina	27–29	0–10
AEK Athens (Greece)	56–58	(Sweden) Alingsås HK	32–27	24–31
HCB Karviná (Czech Republic)	55–45	(Bosnia and Herzegovina) Gračanica	22–18	33–27
HC Visé BM (Belgium)	54–60	(Norway) ØIF Arendal	24–31	30–29
Gorenje Velenje (Slovenia)	55–49	(Serbia) Partizan	28–20	27–29
KEMBIT-Lions (Netherlands)	60–62	(Italy) Junior Fasano	25–35	35–27
Sabbianco A. Famagusta (Cyprus)	48–46	(Luxembourg) Red Boys Differdange	23–20	25–26
HC Fivers Margareten (Austria)	61–65	(Slovenia) Riko Ribnica	33–35	28–30
MŠK Považská Bystrica (Slovakia)	57–48	(Croatia) Gorica	29–24	28–24
Wacker Thun (Switzerland)	48–41	(Greece) Olympiacos	24–22	24–19
BK-46 (Finland)	55–61	(Norway) Nærbø IL	28–26	27–35

== Last 16 ==
The first leg matches were held on 11–12 February 2023, while the second leg matches were held on 18–19 February 2023. The draw was held in EHF office in Vienna.

Results

Team 1	Agg.	Team 2	1st leg	2nd leg
Sabbianco A. Famagusta (Cyprus)	47–58	(Slovenia) Gorenje Velenje	26–31	21–27
HC Dukla Prague (Czech Republic)	68–64	(Switzerland) Wacker Thun	28–26	40–38
Junior Fasano (Italy)	56–70	(Croatia) Sesvete	34–35	22–35
MŠK Považská Bystrica (Slovakia)	58–70	(Norway) Nærbø IL	34–35	24–35
AS SGS Ramhat Hashron (Israel)	52–69	(Sweden) Alingsås HK	21–31	31–38
HCB Karviná (Czech Republic)	56–53	(Serbia) Dinamo Pančevo	30–22	26–31
Runar Sandefjord (Norway)	70–63	(Slovenia) Riko Ribnica	38–29	32–34
Vojvodina (Serbia)	75–66	(Norway) ØIF Arendal	42–29	33–37

== Quarterfinals ==
The first leg matches were held on 18–19 March 2023, while the second leg matches were held on 25–26 March 2023. The draw was held in EHF office in Vienna.

Results

Team 1	Agg.	Team 2	1st leg	2nd leg
Sesvete (Croatia)	50–55	(Norway) Nærbø IL	20–26	30–29
HCB Karviná (Czech Republic)	56–62	(Norway) Runar Sandefjord	31–34	25–28
Alingsås HK (Sweden)	66–57	(Czech Republic) HC Dukla Prague	39–33	27–24
Vojvodina (Serbia)	61–56	(Slovenia) Gorenje Velenje	31–30	30–26

== Semifinals ==
The first leg matches were held on 15–16 April 2023, while the second leg matches were held on 22–23 April 2023. The draw was held in EHF office in Vienna.

Results

Team 1	Agg.	Team 2	1st leg	2nd leg
Runar Sandefjord (Norway)	63–65	(Norway) Nærbø IL	27–29	36–36
Alingsås HK (Sweden)	49–56	(Serbia) Vojvodina	25–24	24–32

== Final ==
The first leg match was held on 28 May 2023, while the second leg match was held on 3 June 2023. The draw was held in EHF office in Vienna.

Results

Team 1	Agg.	Team 2	1st leg	2nd leg
Vojvodina (Serbia)	55–46	(Norway) Nærbø IL	30–23	25–23

== See also ==
- 2022–23 EHF Champions League
- 2022–23 EHF European League
- 2022–23 Women's EHF Champions League
- 2022–23 Women's EHF European League
- 2022–23 Women's EHF European Cup
