= 2012–13 EHF Champions League =

European handball tournament

EHF Champions League
- 2012–13

Tournament information
- Sport: Handball
- Location: Lanxess Arena (FINAL4)
- Dates: 26 September 2012–2 June 2013
- Teams: 40 (qualification stage); 24 (group stage); 16 (knockout stage)

Final positions
- Champions: (Germany) HSV Hamburg (1st title)
- Runner-up: (Spain) Barcelona Intersport

Tournament statistics
- Matches played: 148
- Goals scored: 8265 (55.84 per match)
- Attendance: 690,844 (4,668 per match)
- Top scorer(s): (Denmark) Hans Lindberg (101 goals)

The 2012–13 EHF Champions League was the 53rd edition of Europe's premier club handball tournament and the 20th edition under the current EHF Champions League format. THW Kiel was the defending champion. The final four was played on 1–2 June 2013.

HSV Hamburg won their first title by defeating Barcelona Intersport 30–29 in the final.

== Overview ==
=== Team allocation ===
Group stage
(Germany) THW Kiel (1st)	(Spain) Ademar León (3rd)	(Hungary) MKB Veszprém (1st)	(Switzerland) Kadetten Schaffhausen (1st)
(Germany) Flensburg (2nd)	(France) Montpellier (1st)	(Hungary) Pick Szeged (2nd)	(Croatia) Zagreb (1st)
(Germany) Füchse Berlin (3rd)	(France) Chambéry (2nd)	(Slovenia) Gorenje (1st)	(Poland) Vive Targi Kielce (1st)
(Spain) Barcelona Intersport (1st)	(Russia) Chekhovskiye Medvedi (1st)	(Slovenia) Celje (2nd)	(Sweden) IK Sävehof (1st)
(Spain) Atlético Madrid (2nd)	(Russia) St. Petersburg (2nd)	(Denmark) Bjerringbro-Silkeborg^{2} (1st)	
Qualifying
Qualification tournament			Wild card tournament
(Romania) Constanța (1st)	(Norway) Haslum HK (1st)	(Montenegro) Lovcen (1st)	(Germany) HSV Hamburg (4th)
(Portugal) Porto (1st)	(Austria) Alpla HC Hard (1st)	(Belarus) Dinamo-Minsk (1st)	(France) Saint-Raphaël (3rd)
(North Macedonia) Metalurg (1st)	(Ukraine) Dinamo-Poltava (1st)	(Israel) Maccabi Rishon LeZion (1st)	(Slovenia) Cimos Koper^{3} (3rd)
(Bosnia and Herzegovina) Sloga Doboj (1st)	(Turkey) Beşiktaş (1st)	(Italy) SSV Bozen Loacker (1st)	(Poland) Wisła Płock (2nd)
(Serbia) Partizan (1st)	(Slovakia) Tatran Prešov (1st)		

Notes

- th Title Holder
- Note 2: AG København was seeded in pot 1 for the 2012–13 EHF Champions League group stage draw, which took place in Vienna, Austria, on 6 July 2012. However, the club filed for bankruptcy on 31 July 2012 and their place in the group stage was awarded to Bjerringbro-Silkeborg.
- Note 3: RK Cimos Koper was invited to the Wild card tournament to replace Bjerringbro-Silkeborg, who replaced AG København in the group stage.

== Round and draw dates ==
All draws held at EHF headquarters in Vienna, Austria unless stated otherwise.

Phase	Round	Draw date	First leg	Second leg
Qualifying	Qualification tournament	3 July 2012	8–9 September 2012	
Qualifying	Wild card tournament	3 July 2012	8–9 September 2012	
Group stage	Matchday 1	6 July 2012	26–30 September 2012	
Group stage	Matchday 2	6 July 2012	3–7 October 2012	
Group stage	Matchday 3	6 July 2012	10–14 October 2012	
Group stage	Matchday 4	6 July 2012	17–21 October 2012	
Group stage	Matchday 5	6 July 2012	14–18 November 2012	
Group stage	Matchday 6	6 July 2012	21–25 November 2012	
Group stage	Matchday 7	6 July 2012	28 November–2 December 2012	
Group stage	Matchday 8	6 July 2012	6–10 February 2013	
Group stage	Matchday 9	6 July 2012	13–17 February 2013	
Group stage	Matchday 10	6 July 2012	20–24 February 2013	
Knockout phase	Last 16	26 February 2013	13–17 March 2013	20–24 March 2013
Knockout phase	Quarterfinals	26 March 2013	17–21 April 2013	24–28 April 2013
Knockout phase	Final four	TBD	1–2 June 2013	

== Qualification stage ==
=== Qualification tournament ===
A total of 14 teams will take part in the qualification tournaments. The clubs will be drawn into three groups of four and play a semifinal and the final. The winner of the qualification groups advance to the group stage, while the eliminated clubs will go to the EHF Cup. Matches will be played at 8–9 September 2011. The draw will take place on 3 July, at 11:00 local time at Vienna, Austria.

=== Seedings ===
The two remaining teams from Pot 1 and 4 will play a knock-out match, the winner will go into the group stage. The draw was held on 3 July 2012.

Pot 1	Pot 2	Pot 3	Pot 4
(Romania) HCM Constanța (Bosnia and Herzegovina) RK Sloga Doboj (North Macedonia) HC Metalurg (Belarus) HC Dinamo-Minsk	(Slovakia) HT Tatran Prešov (Norway) Haslum HK (Serbia) RK Partizan	(Ukraine) HC Dinamo-Poltava (Portugal) F.C. Porto (Israel) Maccabi Rishon LeZion	(Austria) Alpla HC Hard (Turkey) Beşiktaş J.K. (Montenegro) RK Lovcen (Italy) SSV Bozen Loacker

=== Qualification tournament 1 ===
RK Partizan organized the event.

Semi-finals
8 September 2012
(Bosnia and Herzegovina) RK Sloga Doboj	25
(Montenegro) RK Lovcen	23
8 September 2012
(Serbia) RK Partizan	27
(Portugal) F.C. Porto	25

Final
9 September 2012
(Bosnia and Herzegovina) RK Sloga Doboj	16
(Serbia) RK Partizan	31
Third place
9 September 2012
(Montenegro) RK Lovcen	25
(Portugal) F.C. Porto	31

=== Qualification tournament 2 ===
Haslum HK organized the event.

Semi-finals
8 September 2012
(North Macedonia) HC Metalurg	25
(Austria) Alpla HC Hard	19
8 September 2012
(Norway) Haslum HK	29
(Ukraine) HC Dinamo-Poltava	28

Final
9 September 2012
(North Macedonia) HC Metalurg	30
(Norway) Haslum HK	20
Third place
9 September 2012
(Austria) Alpla HC Hard	29
(Ukraine) HC Dinamo-Poltava	23

=== Qualification tournament 3 ===
HCM Constanța organized the event.

Semi-finals
8 September 2012
(Romania) HCM Constanța	33
(Italy) SSV Bozen Loacker	22
8 September 2012
(Slovakia) HT Tatran Prešov	36
(Israel) Maccabi Rishon LeZion	20

Final
9 September 2012
(Romania) HCM Constanța	26
(Slovakia) HT Tatran Prešov	21
Third place
9 September 2012
(Italy) SSV Bozen Loacker	30
(Israel) Maccabi Rishon LeZion	33

=== Play-off ===
HC Dinamo-Minsk and Beşiktaş J.K. played a playoff series to determine a participant for the group stage.

8 September 2012; 18:30	Beşiktaş J.K. (Turkey)	22 – 30	(Belarus) HC Dinamo-Minsk	Süleyman Seba Sport Complex, Istanbul; Attendance: 1,500; Referees: Andorka, Hucker (HUN)
8 September 2012; 18:30	Arifoglu 7	(9–15)	Atman 9	Süleyman Seba Sport Complex, Istanbul; Attendance: 1,500; Referees: Andorka, Hucker (HUN)
8 September 2012; 18:30	3× (yellow card)	Report	3× (yellow card) 2× (suspension)	Süleyman Seba Sport Complex, Istanbul; Attendance: 1,500; Referees: Andorka, Hucker (HUN)

9 September 2012; 16:00	HC Dinamo-Minsk (Belarus)	31 – 24	(Turkey) Beşiktaş J.K.	Minsk Sports Palace, Minsk; Attendance: 1,500; Referees: Andorka, Hucker (HUN)
9 September 2012; 16:00	three players 4	(14–13)	Arifoglu 6	Minsk Sports Palace, Minsk; Attendance: 1,500; Referees: Andorka, Hucker (HUN)
9 September 2012; 16:00	3× (yellow card) 3× (suspension)	Report	3× (yellow card) 6× (suspension)	Minsk Sports Palace, Minsk; Attendance: 1,500; Referees: Andorka, Hucker (HUN)

Dinamo-Minsk wins 61–46 on aggregate.

=== Wild card tournament ===
Semi-finals
8 September 2012
(Germany) HSV Hamburg	28
(Poland) Wisła Płock	26
8 September 2012
(France) Saint-Raphaël Var HB	28
(Slovenia) RK Cimos Koper	23

Final
9 September 2012
(Germany) HSV Hamburg	32
(France) Saint-Raphaël Var HB	31
Third place
9 September 2012
(Poland) Wisła Płock	27
(Slovenia) RK Cimos Koper	22

== Group stage ==
Location of teams of the 2012–13 EHF Champions League group stage.
Red: Group A; Green: Group B; Blue: Group C; Yellow: Group D.

The draw for the group stage took place at the Gartenhotel Altmannsdorf in Vienna on 6 July 2012 at 11:00 local time. A total of 24 teams were drawn into four groups of six. Teams were divided into six pots, based on EHF coefficients. Clubs from the same pot or the same association could not be drawn into the same group, except the wild card tournament winner, which did not enjoy any protection.

=== Seedings ===
Pot 1
(Germany) THW Kiel^{TH}
(Denmark) København^{1}
(Spain) Barcelona
(France) Montpellier

Pot 2
(Croatia) Zagreb
(Hungary) Veszprém
(Russia) Medvedi
(Slovenia) Gorenje

Pot 3
(Spain) Atlético Madrid
(Germany) Flensburg
(Poland) Vive Targi Kielce
(Switzerland) Schaffhausen

Pot 4
(Spain) Ademar León
(France) Chambéry
(Germany) Füchse Berlin
(Sweden) IK Sävehof

Pot 5
(Hungary) Pick Szeged
(Russia) St. Petersburg
(Slovenia) Celje
(Belarus) Dinamo-Minsk

Pot 6
(Serbia) Partizan
(North Macedonia) Metalurg
(Romania) Constanța
(Germany) HSV Hamburg

th Title holder. The title holder automatically gets the top position of seeding list.

Notes

- Note 1: AG København was seeded in pot 1 for the 2012–13 EHF Champions League group stage draw, which took place in Vienna, Austria, on 6 July 2012. However, the club filed for bankruptcy on 31 July 2012 and their place in the group stage was awarded to Bjerringbro-Silkeborg.

Key to colours in group tables
Top four placed teams advanced to the last 16

=== Group A ===
Team	Pld	W	D	L	GF	GA	GD	Pts	HAM	FLE	MED	ADE	MON	BEO
(Germany) HSV Hamburg	10	7	2	1	313	272	+41	16	—	31–28	27–27	32–26	35–33	30–24
(Germany) Flensburg	10	6	3	1	310	279	+31	15	29–26	—	36–26	27–22	37–37	31–23
(Russia) Chekhovskiye Medvedi	10	5	4	1	310	282	+28	14	29–29	29–29	—	36–22	35–29	38–31
(Spain) Ademar León	10	3	1	6	265	292	−27	7	26–28	29–29	22–29	—	28–26	28–23
(France) Montpellier	10	2	2	6	301	311	−10	6	29–33	25–27	30–30	27–29	—	31–26
(Serbia) Partizan	10	1	0	9	268	331	−63	2	21–42	31–37	27–31	33–31	29–32	—

=== Group B ===
Team	Pld	W	D	L	GF	GA	GD	Pts	VES	KIE	ATM	CEL	HCM	IKS
(Hungary) MKB Veszprém	10	9	0	1	295	242	+53	18	—	31–30	26–19	32–22	31–21	34–24
(Germany) THW Kiel	10	8	0	2	329	265	+64	16	32–21	—	31–27	30–26	35–14	43–34
(Spain) Atlético Madrid	10	5	0	5	268	269	−1	10	26–27	27–32	—	26–24	25–24	32–25
(Slovenia) Celje	10	4	0	6	245	258	−13	8	19–24	31–28	22–28	—	24–19	31–25
(Romania) HCM Constanța	10	2	0	8	234	283	−49	4	27–37	25–28	23–28	22–17	—	28–23
(Sweden) IK Sävehof	10	2	0	8	276	330	−54	4	22–32	29–40	35–30	24–29	35–31	—

=== Group C ===
Team	Pld	W	D	L	GF	GA	GD	Pts	KSK	RKM	RKG	BSV^{BSV}	CHB	PET
(Poland) Vive Targi Kielce	10	10	0	0	305	249	+56	20	—	21–20	30–24	35–26	36–32	30–29
(North Macedonia) Metalurg Skopje	10	7	0	3	271	215	+56	14	21–23	—	30–23	32–18	26–21	32–19
(Slovenia) Gorenje	10	6	0	4	281	250	+31	12	25–29	23–19	—	31–23	31–25	35–22
(Denmark) Bjerringbro-Silkeborg^{1}	10	4	0	6	259	281	−22	8	25–34	23–26	27–26	—	25–23	31–22
(France) Chambéry	10	2	0	8	266	294	−28	4	26–36	30–33	20–31	29–26	—	33–19
(Russia) St. Petersburg	10	1	0	9	225	318	−93	2	21–31	14–32	25–32	23–35	31–27	—

=== Group D ===
Team	Pld	W	D	L	GF	GA	GD	Pts	BAR	BER	MIN	SZE	RKZ	SCH
(Spain) Barcelona Intersport	10	9	0	1	321	252	+69	18	—	34–23	25–24	33–24	35–25	36–25
(Germany) Füchse Berlin	10	8	0	2	290	279	+11	16	31–30	—	29–25	29–24	29–27	31–27
(Belarus) Dinamo-Minsk	10	5	1	4	276	259	+17	11	28–30	31–24	—	29–24	27–27	33–23
(Hungary) Pick Szeged	10	3	0	7	260	293	−33	6	28–33	22–29	26–21	—	26–24	30–29
(Croatia) Zagreb	10	2	1	7	266	284	−18	5	21–32	24–25	23–25	30–27	—	38–30
(Switzerland) Schaffhausen	10	2	0	8	284	330	−46	4	23–33	35–40	28–33	36–29	28–27	—

== Knockout stage ==
In the knockout phase, teams played against each other over two legs on a home-and-away basis, except for the final four.

=== Last 16 ===
The draw was held on 26 February 2013 at 12:30 in Vienna, Austria. The first legs were played on 13–17 March, and the second legs were played on 20–24 March 2013.

Team 1	Agg.	Team 2	1st leg	2nd leg
Bjerringbro-Silkeborg (Denmark)	50–58	(Spain) Barcelona Intersport	26–32	24–26
Ademar León (Spain)	45–56	(Hungary) MKB Veszprém	20–23	25–33
Pick Szeged (Hungary)	53–57	(Poland) Vive Targi Kielce	26–25	27–32
Celje (Slovenia)	60–66	(Germany) HSV Hamburg	29–38	31–28
Chekhovskiye Medvedi (Russia)	63–65	(Germany) THW Kiel	37–35	26–30
Dinamo-Minsk (Belarus)	45–50	(North Macedonia) Metalurg Skopje	23–26	22–24
Atlético Madrid (Spain)	56–55	(Germany) Füchse Berlin	29–29	27–26
Gorenje (Slovenia)	50–55	(Germany) Flensburg	25–28	25–27

=== Quarterfinals ===
The first legs were played on 17–21 April, and the second legs were played on 24–28 April 2013.

Team 1	Agg.	Team 2	1st leg	2nd leg
Atlético Madrid (Spain)	49–52	(Spain) Barcelona Intersport	25–20	24–32
Metalurg Skopje (North Macedonia)	40–53	(Poland) Vive Targi Kielce	25–27	15–26
THW Kiel (Germany)	61–59	(Hungary) MKB Veszprém	32–31	29–28
Flensburg (Germany)	51–55	(Germany) HSV Hamburg	26–32	25–23

=== Final four ===
The draw was held on 2 May 2013.

Semi-finals
1 June
(Poland) Vive Targi Kielce	23
(Spain) Barcelona Intersport	28
1 June
(Germany) THW Kiel	33
(Germany) HSV Hamburg	39

Final
2 June
(Spain) Barcelona Intersport	29
(Germany) HSV Hamburg	30
Third place
2 June
(Poland) Vive Targi Kielce	31
(Germany) THW Kiel	30

== Top goalscorers ==
Rank	Name	Team	Goals
1	(Denmark) Hans Lindberg	(Germany) Hamburg	101
2	(Belarus) Siarhei Rutenka	(Spain) Barcelona	95
3	(Denmark) Anders Eggert	(Germany) Flensburg	79
4	(Poland) Michał Jurecki	(Poland) Kielce	77
4	(Hungary) László Nagy	(Hungary) Veszprém	77
4	(North Macedonia) Naumče Mojsovski	(North Macedonia) Metalurg Skopje	77
7	(Serbia) Marko Vujin	(Germany) THW Kiel	76
8	(Croatia) Domagoj Duvnjak	(Germany) Hamburg	73
8	(Germany) Holger Glandorf	(Germany) Flensburg	73
10	(Slovenia) Gašper Marguč	(Slovenia) Celje	72

(excluding qualifying rounds)

== Awards ==
The All-star team of the Champions League 2012/13:

Position	Player
Goalkeeper	(Serbia) Darko Stanić (Metalurg Skopje)
Right wing	(Croatia) Ivan Čupić (Vive Targi Kielce)
Right back	(Hungary) László Nagy (MKB Veszprém)
Centre back	(France) Daniel Narcisse (THW Kiel)
Left back	(Czech Republic) Filip Jícha (THW Kiel)
Left wing	(Denmark) Anders Eggert (SG Flensburg-Handewitt)
Pivot	(Spain) Julen Aguinagalde (Atlético Madrid)
Best defender	(Hungary) Timuzsin Schuch (MKB Veszprém)

== See also ==
- 2012–13 EHF Cup
