= 2012–13 EHF Champions League knockout stage =

The knockout stage of the 2012–13 EHF Champions League began on 13 March 2013 and concluded on 2 June 2013 with the final at Lanxess Arena in Cologne, Germany.

Times up to 30 March 2013 (last 16) are UTC+1, thereafter (quarterfinals and final four) times are UTC+2.

== Round and draw dates ==
All draws are held at EHF headquarters in Vienna, Austria.

Round	Draw date	First leg	Second leg
Last 16	26 February 2013, 12:30	13–17 March 2013	20–24 March 2013
Quarterfinals	26 March 2013, 11:00	17–21 April 2013	24–28 April 2013
Final Four	2 May 2013, 11:30	1–2 June 2013 at Lanxess Arena, Cologne	

== Last 16 ==
The draw was held on 26 February 2013 at 12:30 in Vienna, Austria. The first legs were played on 13–17 March, and the second legs were played on 20–24 March 2013.

Team 1	Agg.	Team 2	1st leg	2nd leg
Bjerringbro-Silkeborg (Denmark)	50–58	(Spain) Barcelona Intersport	26–32	24–26
Ademar León (Spain)	45–56	(Hungary) MKB Veszprém	20–23	25–33
Pick Szeged (Hungary)	53–57	(Poland) Vive Targi Kielce	26–25	27–32
Celje (Slovenia)	60–66	(Germany) Hamburg	29–38	31–28
Chekhovskiye Medvedi (Russia)	63–65	(Germany) THW Kiel	37–35	26–30
Dinamo-Minsk (Belarus)	45–50	(North Macedonia) Metalurg Skopje	23–26	22–24
Atlético Madrid (Spain)	56–55	(Germany) Füchse Berlin	29–29	27–26
Gorenje (Slovenia)	50–55	(Germany) Flensburg	25–28	25–27

=== First leg ===
14 March 2013; 19:00	Dinamo-Minsk (Belarus)	23 – 26	(North Macedonia) Metalurg Skopje	Dynama, Minsk; Attendance: 4,000; Referees: Dobrovits, Tájok (HUN)
14 March 2013; 19:00	Nikulenkau, Onufryienko 5	(12–14)	Mojsovski 9	Dynama, Minsk; Attendance: 4,000; Referees: Dobrovits, Tájok (HUN)
14 March 2013; 19:00	2× (yellow card) 2× (suspension)	Report	2× (yellow card) 5× (suspension)	Dynama, Minsk; Attendance: 4,000; Referees: Dobrovits, Tájok (HUN)

14 March 2013; 19:30	Chekhovskiye Medvedi (Russia)	37 – 35	(Germany) THW Kiel	Olimpiysky Sport Palace, Chekhov; Attendance: 2,700; Referees: Cohen, Peretz (ISR)
14 March 2013; 19:30	Gorbok 10	(19–17)	Ilić 10	Olimpiysky Sport Palace, Chekhov; Attendance: 2,700; Referees: Cohen, Peretz (ISR)
14 March 2013; 19:30	3× (yellow card) 3× (suspension)	Report	3× (yellow card) 3× (suspension)	Olimpiysky Sport Palace, Chekhov; Attendance: 2,700; Referees: Cohen, Peretz (ISR)

16 March 2013; 16:15	Celje (Slovenia)	29 – 38	(Germany) HSV Hamburg	Zlatorog Arena, Celje; Attendance: 4,200; Referees: Horváth, Márton (HUN)
16 March 2013; 16:15	Mačkovšek 13	(13–20)	Lindberg 10	Zlatorog Arena, Celje; Attendance: 4,200; Referees: Horváth, Márton (HUN)
16 March 2013; 16:15	3× (yellow card) 4× (suspension)	Report	3× (yellow card) 5× (suspension) 1× (red card)	Zlatorog Arena, Celje; Attendance: 4,200; Referees: Horváth, Márton (HUN)

17 March 2013; 15:00	Pick Szeged (Hungary)	26 – 25	(Poland) Vive Targi Kielce	Városi Sportcsarnok, Szeged; Attendance: 3,200; Referees: Nikolov, Nachevski (MKD)
17 March 2013; 15:00	Prodanović 6	(15–14)	Stojković, Tomczak 4	Városi Sportcsarnok, Szeged; Attendance: 3,200; Referees: Nikolov, Nachevski (MKD)
17 March 2013; 15:00	3× (yellow card) 1× (suspension)	Report	3× (yellow card) 6× (suspension)	Városi Sportcsarnok, Szeged; Attendance: 3,200; Referees: Nikolov, Nachevski (MKD)

17 March 2013; 17:00	Bjerringbro-Silkeborg (Denmark)	26 – 32	(Spain) Barcelona Intersport	Silkeborg-Hallerne, Silkeborg; Attendance: 2,600; Referees: Erdoğan, Özdeniz (TUR)
17 March 2013; 17:00	Jørgensen 6	(12–15)	four players 5	Silkeborg-Hallerne, Silkeborg; Attendance: 2,600; Referees: Erdoğan, Özdeniz (TUR)
17 March 2013; 17:00	3× (yellow card) 3× (suspension)	Report	3× (yellow card) 2× (suspension)	Silkeborg-Hallerne, Silkeborg; Attendance: 2,600; Referees: Erdoğan, Özdeniz (TUR)

17 March 2013; 17:00	Ademar León (Spain)	20 – 23	(Hungary) MKB Veszprém	Palacio de los Deportes, León; Attendance: 5,000; Referees: Dinu, Din (ROU)
17 March 2013; 17:00	Carrillo 5	(8–11)	Nagy 7	Palacio de los Deportes, León; Attendance: 5,000; Referees: Dinu, Din (ROU)
17 March 2013; 17:00	3× (yellow card) 2× (suspension)	Report	3× (yellow card) 6× (suspension)	Palacio de los Deportes, León; Attendance: 5,000; Referees: Dinu, Din (ROU)

17 March 2013; 18:00	Atlético Madrid (Spain)	29 – 29	(Germany) Füchse Berlin	Palacio Vistalegre, Madrid; Attendance: 7,835; Referees: Dentz, Reibel (FRA)
17 March 2013; 18:00	Cañellas 9	(13–10)	Romero 8	Palacio Vistalegre, Madrid; Attendance: 7,835; Referees: Dentz, Reibel (FRA)
17 March 2013; 18:00	3× (yellow card) 1× (suspension)	Report	3× (yellow card) 4× (suspension)	Palacio Vistalegre, Madrid; Attendance: 7,835; Referees: Dentz, Reibel (FRA)

17 March 2013; 19:30	Gorenje (Slovenia)	25 – 28	(Germany) Flensburg	Red Hall, Velenje; Attendance: 1,200; Referees: Lorente, Serradilla (ESP)
17 March 2013; 19:30	Gaber 9	(14–16)	Gústafsson 7	Red Hall, Velenje; Attendance: 1,200; Referees: Lorente, Serradilla (ESP)
17 March 2013; 19:30	3× (yellow card) 2× (suspension)	Report	3× (yellow card) 5× (suspension)	Red Hall, Velenje; Attendance: 1,200; Referees: Lorente, Serradilla (ESP)

=== Second leg ===
21 March 2013; 19:30	HSV Hamburg (Germany)	28 – 31	(Slovakia) Celje	Alsterdorfer Sporthalle, Hamburg; Attendance: 2,605; Referees: Leifsson, Pálsson (ISL)
21 March 2013; 19:30	Duvnjak 7	(13–12)	Mačkovšek 7	Alsterdorfer Sporthalle, Hamburg; Attendance: 2,605; Referees: Leifsson, Pálsson (ISL)
21 March 2013; 19:30	2× (yellow card) 7× (suspension)	Report	2× (yellow card) 4× (suspension)	Alsterdorfer Sporthalle, Hamburg; Attendance: 2,605; Referees: Leifsson, Pálsson (ISL)

HSV Hamburg won 66–60 on aggregate.

23 March 2013; 16:00	MKB Veszprém (Hungary)	33 – 25	(Spain) Ademar León	Veszprém Aréna, Veszprém; Attendance: 5,000; Referees: Krstić, Ljubić (SLO)
23 March 2013; 16:00	Ugalde 7	(15–14)	Ruesga 8	Veszprém Aréna, Veszprém; Attendance: 5,000; Referees: Krstić, Ljubić (SLO)
23 March 2013; 16:00	3× (yellow card) 5× (suspension)	Report	3× (yellow card) 1× (suspension)	Veszprém Aréna, Veszprém; Attendance: 5,000; Referees: Krstić, Ljubić (SLO)

MKB Veszprém won 56–45 on aggregate.

23 March 2013; 17:15	Flensburg (Germany)	27 – 25	(Slovenia) Gorenje	Flens-Arena, Flensburg; Attendance: 4,001; Referees: Caçador, Nicolau (POR)
23 March 2013; 17:15	Glandorf 9	(13–14)	Cehte 8	Flens-Arena, Flensburg; Attendance: 4,001; Referees: Caçador, Nicolau (POR)
23 March 2013; 17:15	3× (yellow card) 3× (suspension)	Report	3× (yellow card) 2× (suspension) 1× (red card)	Flens-Arena, Flensburg; Attendance: 4,001; Referees: Caçador, Nicolau (POR)

Flensburg won 55–50 on aggregate.

23 March 2013; 18:00	Metalurg Skopje (North Macedonia)	24 – 22	(Belarus) Dinamo-Minsk	Boris Trajkovski Sports Center, Skopje; Attendance: 6,963; Referees: Abrahamsen, Kristiansen (NOR)
23 March 2013; 18:00	Vugrinec 7	(11–12)	Atman 7	Boris Trajkovski Sports Center, Skopje; Attendance: 6,963; Referees: Abrahamsen, Kristiansen (NOR)
23 March 2013; 18:00	3× (yellow card) 4× (suspension)	Report	3× (yellow card) 6× (suspension)	Boris Trajkovski Sports Center, Skopje; Attendance: 6,963; Referees: Abrahamsen, Kristiansen (NOR)

Metalurg Skopje won 50–45 on aggregate.

24 March 2013; 17:00	Vive Targi Kielce (Poland)	32 – 27	(Hungary) Pick Szeged	Hala Legionów, Kielce; Attendance: 4,200; Referees: Zotin, Volodkov (RUS)
24 March 2013; 17:00	Ólafsson 8	(14–11)	Larholm 8	Hala Legionów, Kielce; Attendance: 4,200; Referees: Zotin, Volodkov (RUS)
24 March 2013; 17:00	3× (yellow card) 4× (suspension)	Report	3× (yellow card) 3× (suspension)	Hala Legionów, Kielce; Attendance: 4,200; Referees: Zotin, Volodkov (RUS)

Vive Targi Kielce won 57–53 on aggregate.

24 March 2013; 17:15	Barcelona Intersport (Spain)	26 – 24	(Denmark) Bjerringbro-Silkeborg	Palau Blaugrana, Barcelona; Attendance: 2,754; Referees: Fleisch, Rieber (GER)
24 March 2013; 17:15	Rutenka 9	(12–13)	Mortensen 8	Palau Blaugrana, Barcelona; Attendance: 2,754; Referees: Fleisch, Rieber (GER)
24 March 2013; 17:15	3× (yellow card) 3× (suspension)	Report	3× (yellow card) 3× (suspension)	Palau Blaugrana, Barcelona; Attendance: 2,754; Referees: Fleisch, Rieber (GER)

Barcelona Intersport won 58–50 on aggregate.

24 March 2013; 18:00	Füchse Berlin (Germany)	26 – 27	(Spain) Atlético Madrid	Max-Schmeling-Halle, Berlin; Attendance: 9,000; Referees: Nikolić, Stojković (SRB)
24 March 2013; 18:00	Igropulo 8	(13–14)	Lazarov 6	Max-Schmeling-Halle, Berlin; Attendance: 9,000; Referees: Nikolić, Stojković (SRB)
24 March 2013; 18:00	3× (yellow card) 3× (suspension)	Report	3× (yellow card) 3× (suspension)	Max-Schmeling-Halle, Berlin; Attendance: 9,000; Referees: Nikolić, Stojković (SRB)

Atlético Madrid won 56–55 on aggregate.

24 March 2013; 19:30	THW Kiel (Germany)	30 – 26	(Russia) Chekhovskiye Medvedi	Sparkassen-Arena, Kiel; Attendance: 9,800; Referees: Horáček, Novotný (CZE)
24 March 2013; 19:30	Sprenger 6	(17–10)	Shelmenko 6	Sparkassen-Arena, Kiel; Attendance: 9,800; Referees: Horáček, Novotný (CZE)
24 March 2013; 19:30	3× (yellow card) 3× (suspension)	Report	3× (yellow card) 4× (suspension)	Sparkassen-Arena, Kiel; Attendance: 9,800; Referees: Horáček, Novotný (CZE)

THW Kiel won 65–63 on aggregate.

== Quarterfinals ==
=== Seedings ===
The draw was held on 26 March 2013 at 11:00 in Vienna, Austria.

Pot 1	Pot 2
(Germany) HSV Hamburg	(Germany) Flensburg
(Hungary) MKB Veszprém	(Germany) THW Kiel
(Poland) Vive Targi Kielce	(North Macedonia) Metalurg Skopje
(Spain) Barcelona Intersport	(Spain) Atlético Madrid

=== Matches ===
The first legs were played on 17–21 April, and the second legs were played on 24–28 April 2013.

Team 1	Agg.	Team 2	1st leg	2nd leg
Atlético Madrid (Spain)	49–52	(Spain) Barcelona Intersport	25–20	24–32
Metalurg Skopje (North Macedonia)	40–53	(Poland) Vive Targi Kielce	25–27	15–26
THW Kiel (Germany)	61–59	(Hungary) MKB Veszprém	32–31	29–28
Flensburg (Germany)	51–55	(Germany) HSV Hamburg	26–32	25–23

=== First leg ===
20 April 2013; 19:00	Atlético Madrid (Spain)	25 – 20	(Spain) Barcelona Intersport	Palacio Vistalegre, Madrid; Attendance: 11,267; Referees: Horáček, Novotný (CZE)
20 April 2013; 19:00	Cañellas, Lazarov 6	(11–10)	Rutenka 6	Palacio Vistalegre, Madrid; Attendance: 11,267; Referees: Horáček, Novotný (CZE)
20 April 2013; 19:00	3× (yellow card) 4× (suspension)	Report	3× (yellow card) 5× (suspension)	Palacio Vistalegre, Madrid; Attendance: 11,267; Referees: Horáček, Novotný (CZE)

21 April 2013; 17:00	Metalurg Skopje (North Macedonia)	25 – 27	(Poland) Vive Targi Kielce	Boris Trajkovski Sports Center, Skopje; Attendance: 7,000; Referees: Cohen, Peretz (ISR)
21 April 2013; 17:00	Mojsovski 6	(13–13)	three players 4	Boris Trajkovski Sports Center, Skopje; Attendance: 7,000; Referees: Cohen, Peretz (ISR)
21 April 2013; 17:00	3× (yellow card) 1× (suspension)	Report	3× (yellow card) 5× (suspension) 1× (red card)	Boris Trajkovski Sports Center, Skopje; Attendance: 7,000; Referees: Cohen, Peretz (ISR)

21 April 2013; 17:15	THW Kiel (Germany)	32 – 31	(Hungary) MKB Veszprém	Sparkassen-Arena, Kiel; Attendance: 10,000; Referees: Nikolov, Nachevski (MKD)
21 April 2013; 17:15	Vujin 8	(15–16)	Nagy 11	Sparkassen-Arena, Kiel; Attendance: 10,000; Referees: Nikolov, Nachevski (MKD)
21 April 2013; 17:15	3× (yellow card) 1× (suspension)	Report	3× (yellow card) 7× (suspension)	Sparkassen-Arena, Kiel; Attendance: 10,000; Referees: Nikolov, Nachevski (MKD)

21 April 2013; 18:45	Flensburg (Germany)	26 – 32	(Germany) HSV Hamburg	Flens-Arena, Flensburg; Attendance: 3,990; Referees: Mazeika, Gatelis (LTU)
21 April 2013; 18:45	Đorđić 6	(14–15)	three players 6	Flens-Arena, Flensburg; Attendance: 3,990; Referees: Mazeika, Gatelis (LTU)
21 April 2013; 18:45	3× (yellow card) 4× (suspension)	Report	3× (yellow card) 5× (suspension)	Flens-Arena, Flensburg; Attendance: 3,990; Referees: Mazeika, Gatelis (LTU)

=== Second leg ===
27 April 2013; 16:00	MKB Veszprém (Hungary)	28 – 29	(Germany) THW Kiel	Veszprém Aréna, Veszprém; Attendance: 5,000; Referees: Olesen, Pedersen (DEN)
27 April 2013; 16:00	three players 5	(14–12)	Jícha, Vujin 7	Veszprém Aréna, Veszprém; Attendance: 5,000; Referees: Olesen, Pedersen (DEN)
27 April 2013; 16:00	3× (yellow card) 4× (suspension)	Report	3× (yellow card) 5× (suspension)	Veszprém Aréna, Veszprém; Attendance: 5,000; Referees: Olesen, Pedersen (DEN)

THW Kiel won 61–59 on aggregate.

27 April 2013; 19:00	Barcelona Intersport (Spain)	32 – 24	(Spain) Atlético Madrid	Palau Blaugrana, Barcelona; Attendance: 6,521; Referees: Geipel, Helbig (GER)
27 April 2013; 19:00	Rutenka 11	(15–9)	Aguinagalde 11	Palau Blaugrana, Barcelona; Attendance: 6,521; Referees: Geipel, Helbig (GER)
27 April 2013; 19:00	3× (yellow card) 3× (suspension)	Report	3× (yellow card) 3× (suspension)	Palau Blaugrana, Barcelona; Attendance: 6,521; Referees: Geipel, Helbig (GER)

Barcelona Intersport won 52–49 on aggregate.

28 April 2013; 17:00	Vive Targi Kielce (Poland)	26 – 15	(North Macedonia) Metalurg Skopje	Hala Legionów, Kielce; Attendance: 4,200; Referees: López, Ramírez (ESP)
28 April 2013; 17:00	Jurecki 8	(12–8)	Mojsovski, Vugrinec 4	Hala Legionów, Kielce; Attendance: 4,200; Referees: López, Ramírez (ESP)
28 April 2013; 17:00	2× (yellow card) 7× (suspension)	Report	3× (yellow card) 3× (suspension)	Hala Legionów, Kielce; Attendance: 4,200; Referees: López, Ramírez (ESP)

Vive Targi Kielce won 53–40 on aggregate.

28 April 2013; 18:30	HSV Hamburg (Germany)	23 – 25	(Germany) Flensburg	O² World, Hamburg; Attendance: 7,402; Referees: Stoļarovs, Līcis (LAT)
28 April 2013; 18:30	Lindberg 6	(10–13)	Eggert Jensen 6	O² World, Hamburg; Attendance: 7,402; Referees: Stoļarovs, Līcis (LAT)
28 April 2013; 18:30	3× (yellow card)	Report	3× (yellow card) 1× (suspension)	O² World, Hamburg; Attendance: 7,402; Referees: Stoļarovs, Līcis (LAT)

HSV Hamburg won 55–51 on aggregate.

== Final four ==
The draw was held on 2 May 2013.

Semi-finals
1 June
(Poland) Vive Targi Kielce	23
(Spain) Barcelona Intersport	28
1 June
(Germany) THW Kiel	33
(Germany) HSV Hamburg	39

Final
2 June
(Spain) Barcelona Intersport	29
(Germany) HSV Hamburg	30
Third place
2 June
(Poland) Vive Targi Kielce	31
(Germany) THW Kiel	30

=== Semifinals ===
1 June 2013; 15:15	Vive Targi Kielce (Poland)	23 – 28	(Spain) Barcelona Intersport	Lanxess Arena, Cologne; Attendance: 20,000; Referees: Leifsson, Pálsson (ISL)
1 June 2013; 15:15	Štrlek 4	(10–13)	Rutenka 8	Lanxess Arena, Cologne; Attendance: 20,000; Referees: Leifsson, Pálsson (ISL)
1 June 2013; 15:15	3× (yellow card) 3× (suspension)	Report	3× (yellow card) 1× (suspension)	Lanxess Arena, Cologne; Attendance: 20,000; Referees: Leifsson, Pálsson (ISL)

1 June 2013; 18:00	THW Kiel (Germany)	33 – 39	(Germany) HSV Hamburg	Lanxess Arena, Cologne; Attendance: 20,000; Referees: Dentz, Reibel (FRA)
1 June 2013; 18:00	Vujin 10	(16–19)	Duvnjak 11	Lanxess Arena, Cologne; Attendance: 20,000; Referees: Dentz, Reibel (FRA)
1 June 2013; 18:00	3× (yellow card) 5× (suspension)	Report	3× (yellow card) 4× (suspension)	Lanxess Arena, Cologne; Attendance: 20,000; Referees: Dentz, Reibel (FRA)

=== Third place game ===
2 June 2013; 15:15	Vive Targi Kielce (Poland)	31 – 30	(Germany) THW Kiel	Lanxess Arena, Cologne; Attendance: 19,250; Referees: Caçador, Nicolau (POR)
2 June 2013; 15:15	Stojković 8	(19–12)	Ilić, Jícha 6	Lanxess Arena, Cologne; Attendance: 19,250; Referees: Caçador, Nicolau (POR)
2 June 2013; 15:15	2× (yellow card) 4× (suspension) 1× (red card)	Report	2× (yellow card) 2× (suspension)	Lanxess Arena, Cologne; Attendance: 19,250; Referees: Caçador, Nicolau (POR)

=== Final ===
2 June 2013
18:00
Barcelona Intersport (Spain)
29 – 30 (ET)
(Germany) HSV Hamburg
Lanxess Arena, Cologne
Attendance: 19,250
Referees: Abrahamsen, Kristiansen (NOR)
Rutenka 8
(11–9)
Kraus, Lindberg 6
3× (yellow card) 4× (suspension)
Report
2× (yellow card) 4× (suspension)

FT: 25–25 ET: 2–3
