= 2011–12 Slovenian First League (men's handball) =

Slovenian First League of Handball
- Season: 2011–12
- Champions: Gorenje
- Relegated: Šmartno; Loka
- Champions League: Gorenje; Celje
- EHF Cup: Koper; Maribor

The 2011–12 Slovenian First League was the 21st season of the 1. A liga, Slovenia's premier handball league. RD Loka withdrew after 11 rounds.

== Teams information ==
Location of teams in the 2011–12 Slovenian First League

Team	Location	Stadium	Capacity
Celje	Celje	Zlatorog Arena	5,500
Gorenje	Velenje	Red Hall	3,000
Koper	Koper	Bonifika Hall	3,200
Krka	Novo Mesto	Marof Hall	2,000
Krško	Krško	Sports Hall Krško	800
Maribor Branik	Maribor	Tabor Hall	3,261
Jeruzalem Ormož	Ormož	Hardek Hall	600
Izola	Izola	Sports Hall Izola	1,000
Ribnica	Ribnica	Sports Centre	1,000
Šmartno	Šmartno pri Litiji	Pungrt Hall	700
Trimo Trebnje	Trebnje	OŠ Trebnje Hall	1,000

== Regular season ==
=== Standings ===
	Team	Pld	W	D	L	GF	GA	Diff	Pts
1	Gorenje	20	19	1	0	700	519	+181	39
2	Celje	20	16	1	3	639	488	+151	33
3	Koper	20	14	1	5	637	552	+85	29
4	Trimo Trebnje	20	11	0	9	565	546	+19	22
5	Maribor Branik	20	7	3	10	587	584	+3	17
6	Krško	20	8	1	11	493	556	–63	17
7	Izola	20	6	2	12	486	556	–70	14
8	Ribnica	20	5	3	12	532	577	–45	13
9	Jeruzalem Ormož	20	5	3	12	561	605	–44	13
10	Krka	20	4	4	12	560	645	–85	12
11	Šmartno	20	3	5	12	524	656	–132	11

Champion Playoff
Relegation Round

Pld – Played; W – Won; L – Lost; PF – Points for; PA – Points against; Diff – Difference; Pts – Points.

== Championship play-offs ==
=== Standings ===
	Team	Pld	W	D	L	GF	GA	Diff	Pts	Qualification
1	Gorenje	10	10	0	0	331	272	+59	59	2012–13 EHF Champions League group stage
2	Celje	10	6	1	3	302	262	+40	46	2012–13 EHF Champions League group stage
3	Koper	10	7	0	3	305	275	+30	43	2012–13 EHF Champions League wild card tournament
4	Trimo Trebnje	10	3	0	7	280	317	–37	28	
5	Maribor Branik	10	3	1	6	300	312	–12	24	2012–13 EHF European Cup second qualifying round
6	Krško	10	0	0	10	255	335	–80	17	

Pld – Played; W – Won; L – Lost; PF – Points for; PA – Points against; Diff – Difference; Pts – Points.

=== Results ===
In the table below the home teams are listed on the left and the away teams along the top.

	CEL	VEL	KOP	KRŠ	MAR	TRE
Celje		25–33	24–23	33–23	35–21	35–22
Gorenje	34–31		27–25	31–22	33–29	37–27
Koper	29–24	29–31		37–28	34–30	31–24
Krško	21–32	30–39	22–26		26–33	26–27
Maribor Branik	29–29	28–35	33–34	39–29		29–27
Trimo Trebnje	27–34	26–31	32–37	38–28	30–29	

== Relegation round ==
	Team	Pld	W	D	L	GF	GA	Diff	Pts	Relegation
1	Krka	8	8	0	0	264	222	+42	28	
2	Ribnica	8	6	0	2	257	237	+20	25	
3	Jeruzalem Ormož	8	3	0	5	230	229	+1	19	
4	Izola	8	2	0	6	231	244	–13	18	
5	Šmartno	8	1	0	7	215	265	–50	13	Relegation to the 2012–13 Slovenian Second League

Pld – Played; W – Won; L – Lost; PF – Points for; PA – Points against; Diff – Difference; Pts – Points.
