= 2011–12 Russian Handball Super League =

Russian Handball Super League
- Season: 2011–12
- Champions: C. Medvedi
- Champions League: C. Medvedi; St. Petersburg HC
- European Cup: Sungul

2011–12 Russian Handball Super League season.

== Team information ==
2011–12 season

Club	Arena	Capacity
Medvedi Chekhov		
St. Petersburg HC		
Kaustik Volgograd		
Sungul Sneschinsk		
Lokomotiv Chelyabinsk		
Zarja Kaspija		
Medvedi Perm		
Medvedi Chekhov II		
SKIF Krasnodar		
Dynamo VS		
Energiya Voronezh		
Fakel-Krasnyj		

== Results ==
=== Regular season ===
Pos	Team	Pld	W	D	L	GF	GA	GD	Pts	Qualification
1	Chekhovskiye Medvedi	22	22	0	0	909	587	+322	44	Champion playoff
2	St. Petersburg	22	18	0	4	719	614	+105	36	Champion playoff
3	Kaustik Volgograd	22	16	1	5	770	684	+86	33	Champion playoff
4	Sungul Sneschinsk	22	13	3	6	668	669	−1	29	Champion playoff
5	Lokomotiv Chelyabinsk	22	12	2	8	667	650	+17	26	Champion playoff
6	Zarja Kaspija	22	11	2	9	697	651	+46	24	Champion playoff
7	Medvedi Perm	22	9	0	13	664	681	−17	18	Champion playoff
8	Medvedi Chekhov II	22	8	1	13	681	726	−45	17	Champion playoff
9	SKIF Krasnodar	22	7	1	14	697	699	−2	15	Relegation round
10	Dynamo VS	22	5	2	15	616	759	−143	12	Relegation round
11	Energiya Voronezh	22	3	0	19	514	733	−219	6	Relegation round
12	Fakel-Krasnyj	22	2	0	20	608	757	−149	4	Relegation round

=== Championship round ===
==== Quarter finals ====
Team 1	Score	Team 2
Zarja Kaspija	1 - 2	Kaustik Volgograd
Lokomotiv Chelyabinsk	0 - 2	Sungul Sneschinsk
Medvedi Perm	0 - 2	St. Petersburg HC
Medvedi Chekhov II	0 - 2	Medvedi Chekhov

==== Semifinals ====
Team 1	Score	Team 2
Sungul Sneschinsk	0 - 2	Medvedi Chekhov
Kaustik Volgograd	0 - 2	St. Petersburg HC

==== Finals ====
Team 1	Score	Team 2
St. Petersburg HC	0 - 2	Medvedi Chekhov

17-5-2012	St. Petersburg HC	26 - 28	Medvedi Chekhov

21-5-2012	Medvedi Chekhov	34 - 19	St. Petersburg HC

=== Relegation round ===
Pos	Team	Pld	W	D	L	GF	GA	GD	SP	Pts	Relegation
1	SKIF Krasnodar	12	10	1	1	416	335	+81	15	36	
2	Dynamo VS	12	6	0	6	369	358	+11	12	24	
3	Energiya Voronezh	12	5	2	5	343	363	−20	6	18	
4	Fakel-Krasnyj	12	1	1	10	316	388	−72	4	7	Relegated
