= 2011–12 Handball-Bundesliga =

Handball-Bundesliga
- Season: 2011–12
- Dates: 3 September 2011 - 2 June 2012
- Champions: THW Kiel
- Relegated: Bergischer HC; TV 05/07 Hüttenberg; Eintracht Hildesheim
- EHF Champions League: THW Kiel; SG Flensburg-Handewitt; Füchse Berlin; HSV Hamburg
- EHF Cup: Rhein-Neckar Löwen; SC Magdeburg; Frisch Auf Göppingen
- Matches: 306
- Goals: 17,274 (56.45 per match)
- Top goalscorer: Uwe Gensheimer (Rhein-Neckar Löwen) (247 goals)
- Total attendance: 1,389,546
- Average attendance: 4,541

The 2011–12 Handball-Bundesliga was the 47th season of the Handball-Bundesliga, Germany's premier handball league, and the 35th season consisting of only one league. HSV Hamburg were the defending champions.

== Team information ==
Location of teams in the 2011–12 Handball-Bundesliga

Team	Location	Arena	Capacity
Bergischer HC	Wuppertal	Uni-Halle	4,100
Eintracht Hildesheim	Hildesheim	Sparkassenarena	2,800
Frisch Auf Göppingen	Göppingen	EWS Arena	4,300
Füchse Berlin	Berlin	Max-Schmeling-Halle	8,500
SC Magdeburg	Magdeburg	GETEC Arena	7,782
TuS Nettelstedt-Lübbecke	Lübbecke	Merkur Arena	3,300
HSV Hamburg	Hamburg	O2 World Hamburg	13,000
HSG Wetzlar	Wetzlar	RITTAL Arena	4,412
HBW Balingen-Weilstetten	Balingen	Sparkassen-Arena	2,000
Rhein-Neckar Löwen	Mannheim	SAP Arena	14,500
SG Flensburg-Handewitt	Flensburg	Campushalle	6,300
TBV Lemgo	Lemgo	Lipperlandhalle	5,000
THW Kiel	Kiel	Sparkassen-Arena	10,250
TSV Hannover-Burgdorf	Hannover	AWD Hall	4,200
MT Melsungen	Kassel	Rothenbach-Halle	4,300
TV 05/07 Hüttenberg	Hüttenberg	Sporthalle Hüttenberg	1,600
TV Grosswallstadt	Elsenfeld	Sparkassen-Arena	4,200
VfL Gummersbach	Gummersbach	Eugen-Haas-Halle	2,100

== League table ==
	Team	Pld	W	D	L	GF	GA	Diff	Pts	Qualification or relegation
1	THW Kiel	34	34	0	0	1107	809	+298	68:0	2012–13 EHF Champions League group stage
2	SG Flensburg-Handewitt	34	28	1	5	1060	907	+153	57:11	2012–13 EHF Champions League group stage
3	Füchse Berlin	34	25	3	6	1016	877	+139	53:15	2012–13 EHF Champions League group stage
4	HSV Hamburg	34	25	1	8	1046	935	+111	51:17	2012–13 EHF Champions League wild card tournament
5	Rhein-Neckar Löwen	34	23	2	9	1044	953	+91	48:20	2012–13 EHF European Cup third qualifying round
6	SC Magdeburg	34	19	1	14	985	940	+45	39:29	2012–13 EHF European Cup third qualifying round
7	TBV Lemgo	34	17	4	13	988	979	+9	38:30	
8	Frisch Auf Göppingen	34	15	3	16	901	914	−13	33:35	2012–13 EHF European Cup third qualifying round
9	TuS Nettelstedt-Lübbecke	34	14	2	18	944	953	-9	30:38	
10	MT Melsungen	34	12	6	16	947	993	−46	30:38	
11	VfL Gummersbach	34	13	3	18	1008	1078	−70	29:39	
12	TV Grosswallstadt	34	12	3	19	865	928	−63	27:41	
13	TSV Hannover-Burgdorf	34	10	4	20	980	1050	−70	24:44	
14	HBW Balingen-Weilstetten	34	11	2	21	857	936	−79	24:44	
15	HSG Wetzlar	34	10	3	21	857	896	−39	23:45	
16	Bergischer HC	34	8	1	25	921	1037	−116	17:51	Relegation to the 2012–13 2. Handball-Bundesliga
17	TV 05/07 Hüttenberg	34	6	5	23	883	1008	−125	17:51	Relegation to the 2012–13 2. Handball-Bundesliga
18	Eintracht Hildesheim	34	2	0	32	865	1081	−216	4:64	Relegation to the 2012–13 2. Handball-Bundesliga

- Updated to games played on 2 June 2012
- Source:DKB Handball-Bundesliga - Handball - DKB HBL_Tabelle
- The number on the left of the colon is points gained, the number to the left is points conceded

== Attendances to arenas ==
=== Average attendances ===
Pos	Team	Total	High	Low	Average	Change
1	THW Kiel	—	—	—	—	n/a
2	SG Flensburg-Handewitt	—	—	—	—	n/a
3	Füchse Berlin	—	—	—	—	n/a
4	HSV Hamburg	—	—	—	—	n/a^{1}
5	Rhein-Neckar Löwen	—	—	—	—	n/a
6	SC Magdeburg	—	—	—	—	n/a
7	TBV Lemgo	—	—	—	—	n/a
8	FRISCH AUF! Göppingen	—	—	—	—	n/a
9	TuS Nettelstedt-Lübbecke	—	—	—	—	n/a
10	MT Melsungen	—	—	—	—	n/a
11	VfL Gummersbach	—	—	—	—	n/a
12	TV Großwallstadt	—	—	—	—	n/a
13	TSV Hannover-Burgdorf	—	—	—	—	n/a^{2}
14	HBW Balingen-Weilstetten	—	—	—	—	n/a
15	HSG Wetzlar	—	—	—	—	n/a
16	Bergischer HC	—	—	—	—	n/a^{3,4}
17	TV 05/07 Hüttenberg	—	—	—	—	n/a^{3}
18	Eintracht Hildesheim	—	—	—	—	n/a^{3}
	League total	1,389,546	—	—	4,541	n/a

Updated to match(es) played on 2 June 2012. Source:
Notes:
1: HSV Hamburg played its home matches at the O_{2} World Hamburg.
2: TSV Hannover-Burgdorf played selected home matches at the TUI Arena.
3: Team played the previous season in the second division.
4: Bergischer HC played home matches at the Uni-Halle in Wuppertal and the Klingenhalle in Solingen.
The individual club totals, highest attendances, lowest attendances and averages were not available in the cited season summary. The teams are therefore listed according to their final league positions.
