= 2011–12 BIH Premier League =

2011-12 BIH Premier League
- League: BIH Premier League
- Sport: Handball
- Teams: 14 (regular season); 6 (championship)

Regular season

Seasons
- ← 2010–11 2012–13 →

The 2011–12 BIH Premier League season is the eleventh since its establishment.

== Teams ==
Locations of teams participating in the 2011-12 season

	Teams	Team	City	Venue (Capacity)
Regular season	14			
Regular season	14	Sloga Doboj		
Regular season	14	MRK Goražde		
Regular season	14	Čelik Zenica		
Regular season	14	Gradačac		
Regular season	14	Zrinjski Mostar		
Regular season	14	Konjuh Živinice		
Regular season	14	Krivaja Zavidović		
Regular season	14	Derventa		
Regular season	14	Gračanica		
Regular season	14	Leotar Trebinje		
Regular season	14	Bosna Visoko		
Regular season	14	Vogošca		
Regular season	14	Maglaj		
Regular season	14	Prijedor		
Champions Round	3			
Champions Round	3	Bosna BH Gas	Sarajevo	KSC Skenderija
Champions Round	3	Izviđač Mi Grupa	Ljubuški	Gradska sportska dvorana Ljubuški
Champions Round	3	Borac m:tel	Banja Luka	Sportska dvorana Borik

== Regular season ==
=== Standings ===
	Team	Pld	W	D	L	GF	GA	Diff	Pts
1	Sloga Doboj	26	20	1	5	817	723	+94	61
2	MRK Goražde	26	19	2	5	760	620	+140	59
3	Čelik Zenica	26	16	5	5	875	786	+89	53
4	Gradačac	26	16	2	8	787	716	+71	50
5	Zrinjski Mostar	26	16	1	9	734	704	+30	49
6	Konjuh Živinice	26	13	2	11	708	674	+34	41
7	Krivaja Zavidović	26	12	2	12	738	762	-24	38
8	Derventa	26	10	4	12	747	752	-5	34
9	Gračanica	26	11	1	14	741	770	-29	34
10	Leotar Trebinje	26	10	0	16	665	681	-16	30
11	Bosna Visoko	26	10	0	16	747	846	-99	30
12	Vogošca	26	7	3	16	721	758	-37	24
13	Maglaj	26	5	3	18	680	784	-104	18
14	Prijedor	26	3	2	21	694	838	-144	11

Qualified for Championship Round
Relegated

Pld - Played; W - Won; L - Lost; PF - Points for; PA - Points against; Diff - Difference; Pts - Points.

== Championship Round ==
=== Standings ===
	Team	Pld	W	D	L	GF	GA	Diff	Pts
1	Sloga Doboj	10	8	0	2	318	278	+40	24
2	Borac Banja Luka	10	7	0	3	319	269	+50	21
3	HRK Izviđač	10	5	0	5	325	292	+33	15
4	MRK Goražde	10	5	0	5	290	312	-22	15
5	Čelik Zenica	10	3	0	7	323	348	-25	9
6	Bosna Sarajevo	10	2	0	8	239	315	-76	6

Champion

Pld - Played; W - Won; L - Lost; PF - Points for; PA - Points against; Diff - Difference; Pts - Points.

== See also ==
- 2011–12 SEHA League
