= Hans Lindberg =

Danish handball player (born 1981)

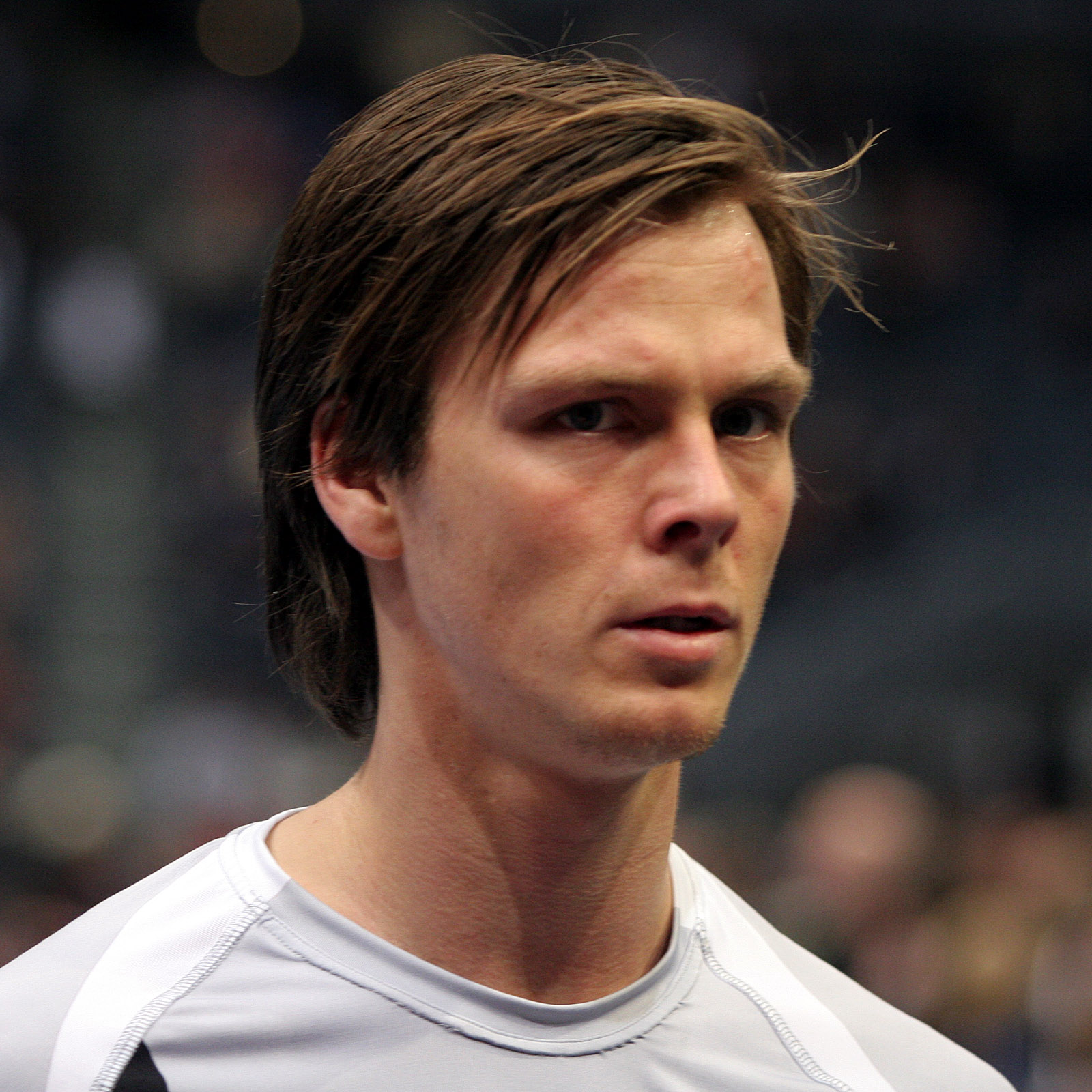
- Lindberg with HSV Hamburg in 2008

Personal information
- Full name: Hans Óttar Lindberg Tómasson
- Nationality: Danish
- Born: 1 August 1981 (age 45) Høje-Taastrup, Denmark
- Height: 1.88 m (6 ft 2 in)

Sport
- Sport: Handball
- Position: Right wing

Youth career
- Years: Team
- –: Høj Ølstykke

Senior clubs
- Years: Team
- 1999–2005: Team Helsinge
- 2005–2007: Viborg HK
- 2007–2016: HSV Hamburg
- 2016–2024: Füchse Berlin
- 2024–2026: HØJ Elite
National team
Years	Team	Apps	(Gls)
2003–2024	Denmark	308	(809)
Medal record
Olympic Games
Gold medal – first place	2024 Paris	Team
World Championship
Gold medal – first place	2019 Germany/Denmark
Gold medal – first place	2023 Poland/Sweden
Silver medal – second place	2011 Sweden
Silver medal – second place	2013 Spain
European Championship
Gold medal – first place	2008 Norway
Gold medal – first place	2012 Serbia
Silver medal – second place	2014 Denmark
Silver medal – second place	2024 Germany
Bronze medal – third place	2022 Hungary/Slovakia

Hans Óttar Lindberg Tómasson (born 1 August 1981) is a Danish former handball player of Icelandic descent who last played for HØJ Elite and the Danish national team. He has played the second most matches for the Danish national team, and measured in years he has the record for longest time on the national team ever as well as oldest player for the Danish team. He is also the all time German Bundesliga top scorer. Since his retirement in 2026, he has been the sporting director at HØJ Elite.

He won the 2008 European Men's Handball Championship and the 2012 European Men's Handball Championship with the Danish national team.

He is of Icelandic descent as both of Lindberg's parents, Tómas Erling Lindberg and Sigrún Sigurðardóttir, are Icelandic. His parents played handball in Iceland with Fimleikafélag Hafnarfjarðar. He had Icelandic citizenship until he was 18. His paternal grandparents immigrated to Iceland from Suduroy on the Faroe Islands in the mid-1940s.

He is sometimes referred to as the Icelander on the Danish national team in Icelandic media. He understands Icelandic in conversation but is unable or refuses to speak Icelandic when speaking to media.

== Career ==
Lindberg played primarily football as a kid, but later switched to handball. He started playing handball at the club Høj Ølstykke. His professional career in Team Helsinge. In 2006, Team Helsinge merged with Hillerød HK, and is now Nordsjælland Håndbold. Between 2005 and 2007 he played for Viborg HK In the 2006–07 season, he was the top scorer in the Danish league with 187 goals in 26 matches. Viborg reached the final of the Danish Championship, but lost to GOG Svendborg TGI.

In 2007, he joined German club HSV Hamburg. It was reported in Danish media that THW Kiel was also interested in him, but it was denied by the club. With HSV, he won the DHB-Supercup in 2009. He won 2012–13 EHF Champions League with HSV Hamburg, becoming top scorer in the tournament.

Lindberg became the 2009–2010, 2012–2013, and 2021–2022 season's Bundesliga Best Goal Scorer.

From 2016 to 2024 he played for Füchse Berlin.

On 20 May 2023, Lindberg became the highest scoring player in Bundesliga history. The 12 goals he scored against GWD Minden took him past the 2905 goals scored by Yoon Kyung-shin.

He won the 2022–23 EHF European League with Füchse Berlin.

In 2024 he returned to Denmark and joined HØJ Elite. He retired after the 2025-26, where the club was relegated from the Herrehåndboldligaen. After his retirement, he was offered the position of sporting director at the club.

== Individual awards ==
- All-Star Right wing of the World Championship: 2013
- Top scorer EHF Champions League: 2012–2013.
- Top scorer of the Handball-Bundesliga (HBL): 2009–2010, 2012–2013, 2021–2022
- EHF Excellence Awards Best right wing of the season: 2022–2023
- Topscorer of the Danish League: 2006-07
