= 2011–12 LNH Division 1 =

LNH Division 1
- Season: 2011–12
- Champions: Montpellier
- Relegated: Istres; Nîmes
- Champions League: Montpellier; Chambéry
- European Cup: Saint Raphaël; Nantes
- Top goalscorer: Guillaume Saurina (162)

2011–12 Ligue Nationale de Handball Division 1 season was the 60th since its establishment. Montpellier were the defending champions, having won their title the previous season.

== Team information ==
2011–12 LNH teams

Team	Location	Arena	Capacity
Chambéry	Chambéry	Le Phare	4,500
Nîmes	Nîmes	Le Parnasse	3,391
Toulouse	Toulouse	Palais des Sports André Brouat	3,751
Montpellier	Montpellier	Arena Montpellier	9,000
Paris	Paris	Stade Pierre de Coubertin	4,016
Créteil	Créteil	Palais des Sports Robert Oubron	2,500
Dunkerque	Dunkerque	Salle Dewerdt	2,500
Istres	Istres	Halle polyvalente	2,000
St.-Raphaël	Saint-Raphaël	Palais des Sports Intercommunal	2,000
Cesson-Rennes	Rennes	Palais des Sports de la Valette	1,400
Nantes	Nantes	Palais des Sports de Beaulieu	5,500
Ivry	Ivry-sur-Seine	Gymnase Auguste Delaune	1,500
Tremblay	Tremblay-en-France	Palais des sports de Tremblay-en-France	1,200
Sélestat	Sélestat	CSI Séléstat	2,200

== League table ==
	Team	Pld	W	D	L	GF	GA	Diff	Pts	Qualification or relegation
1	Montpellier	26	23	1	2	887	712	+175	47	2012–13 EHF Champions League group stage
2	Chambéry	26	19	1	6	728	656	+72	39	2012–13 EHF Champions League group stage
3	Saint Raphaël	26	18	0	8	742	718	+24	36	2012–13 EHF Champions League wild card tournament
4	HBC Nantes	26	12	7	7	729	717	+12	31	2012–13 EHF European Cup third qualifying round
5	Dunkerque	26	15	1	10	713	665	+48	31	
6	Toulouse	26	11	2	13	718	730	−12	24	
7	Sélestat	26	10	2	14	732	761	−29	22	
8	Créteil	26	10	1	15	688	748	−60	21	
9	Ivry	26	8	4	14	649	682	−33	20	
10	Cesson	26	9	2	15	691	707	−16	20	
11	Tremblay HB	26	10	0	16	673	724	−51	20	
12	Paris HB	26	9	0	17	704	757	−53	18	
13	Istres HB	26	8	2	16	720	760	−40	18	Relegation to the 2012–13 LNH Division 2
14	USAM Nîmes	26	8	1	17	685	722	−37	17	Relegation to the 2012–13 LNH Division 2

Pld - Played; W - Won; L - Lost; PF - Points for; PA - Points against; Diff - Difference; Pts - Points.

== Statistics ==
=== Top scorers ===
Rank	Name	Club	Goals
1	(France) Guillaume Saurina	USAM Nîmes Gard	162
2	(Spain) Valero Rivera	HBC Nantes	158
3	(France) Jérôme Fernandez	Fenix Toulouse Handball	157
4	(France) Hugo Descat	US Créteil Handball	148
5	(France) Damien Scaccianoce	USAM Nîmes Gard	146
