= Rudolf Faluvégi =

Hungarian handball player (born 1994)

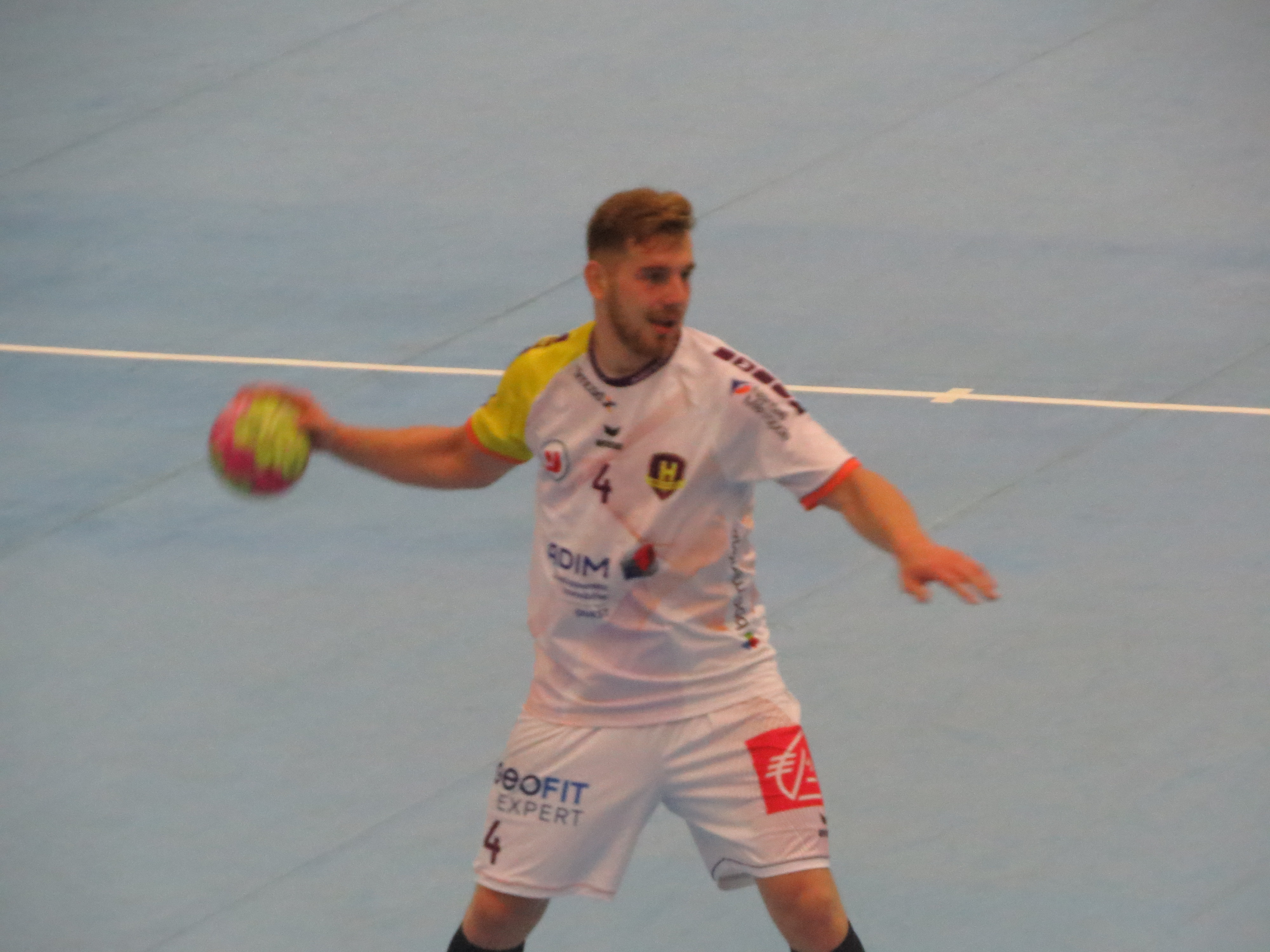

Personal information
- Nationality: Hungarian
- Born: 9 January 1994 (age 32) Budapest, Hungary
- Height: 1.92 m (6 ft 4 in)

Sport
- Sport: Handball
- Position: Left back
- Current club: HSC Suhr Aarau
- Number: 8

Senior clubs
- Years: Team
- 2010–2012: PLER KC
- 2012–2015: Balatonfüredi KSE
- 2015–2017: Csurgói KK
- 2017–2019: HBC Nantes
- 2019: Cesson Rennes MHB
- 2019–2021: TVB 1898 Stuttgart
- 2021–2022: Cesson Rennes MHB
- 2022–2025: HSC Suhr Aarau
National team
Years	Team	Apps	(Gls)
2015–	Hungary	14	(22)
- Updated on 31 January 2019

Rudolf Faluvégi (born 9 January 1994) is a Hungarian handball player who plays for HSC Suhr Aarau and the Hungarian national team.

His sister, Dorottya Faluvégi is also a professional handball player.

== Honours ==
=== Individual ===
- Hungarian Adolescent Handballer of the Year: 2010
- Hungarian Youth Handballer of the Year: 2013
