= HSC Suhr Aarau =

Swiss handball club

- Full name: Handball Sport Club Suhr Aarau
- Short name: HSC
- Founded: May 29, 2008; 18 years ago
- Arena: Schachenhalle Aarau
- Capacity: 1,500
- Head coach: Aleksandar Stevic
- League: Quickline Handball League
- Club colours
Home	Away

HSC Suhr Aarau is a Swiss professional handball team located in Aarau, that plays in the Quickline Handball League.

Location of HSC Suhr Aarau

== History ==
On May 29, 2008, BTV Aarau and TV Suhr merged to form HSC Suhr Aarau. Their home matches are played at the Schachenhalle Aarau which has a capacity of 1,500. They compete in the first league of Swiss handball and have won the Swiss SuperCup once so far (2020).

== Crest, colours, supporters ==
=== Kit manufacturers ===
Period	Kit manufacturer
2020	(Germany) Adidas
2020 - present	(Denmark) Hummel

=== Kits ===
HOME
2012–15	2015–16	2017–18

AWAY
2012–15	2015–16

== Management ==
Position	Name
Sports Director	(Switzerland) Michael Conde
Member Of The Board	(Switzerland) Adrian Lehner
Member Of The Board	(Switzerland) Reto Suter

== Team ==
=== Current squad ===
Squad for the 2025–26 season

HSC Suhr Aarau

Goalkeepers

- 1 (Serbia) Nikola Perić
- 12 (Croatia) Ivan Herceg
- 16 (Switzerland) (Spain) Carlos Caforio
- 94 (Serbia) Dragan Marjanac

Left Wingers

- 3 (Switzerland) Nikos Sarlos
- 5 (Switzerland) Finn Kreuzer
- 23 (Switzerland) Julius Völkin

Right Wingers

- 13 (Switzerland) Cédric Läber
- 20 (Switzerland) Thomas Bieri
- 25 (North Macedonia) Martin Popovski

Line Players

- 6 (Poland) Oskar Witczak
- 17 (Switzerland) Seya Grau
- 18 (Switzerland) Filip Stojanoski
- 21 (Switzerland) Timon Gnehm

Left Backs

- 7 (Germany) David Knezević
- 11 (Croatia) Marijan Marić

Central Backs

- 4 (Switzerland) Robin Köchli
- 8 (Switzerland) Colin Müller
- 10 (Switzerland) Luc Honegger
- 24 (Switzerland) Nico Dubi

Right Backs

- 9 (Portugal) João Ferraz
- 15 (Switzerland) Thierry Dumont
- 19 (Switzerland) Raphael Rohr

=== Technical staff ===
- Head coach: (Germany) (Serbia) Aleksandar Stevic
- Goalkeeping coach: (Serbia) Dragan Marjanac
- Physiotherapist: (Switzerland) Jürg Merz
- Physiotherapist: (Switzerland) Nadine Vis
- Physiotherapist: (Switzerland) Tanja Wasser

=== Transfers ===
Transfers for the 2026–27 season

Joining

- (Switzerland) Timothy Reichmuth (LW) from (Germany) ThSV Eisenach
- (Switzerland) David Hrachovec (RW) from (Switzerland) Kadetten Schaffhausen
- (Switzerland) Manoy Ugiagbe (LB) from (Switzerland) Kadetten Schaffhausen
- (Switzerland) Alessio Lioi (CB) from (Switzerland) Pfadi Winterthur
- (Switzerland) Jannis Scheidiger (GK) on loan from (Switzerland) HC Kriens-Luzern

Leaving

- (Switzerland) Nikos Sarlos (LW) to (Switzerland) Kadetten Schaffhausen

=== Transfer History ===
Transfers for the 2025–26 season

Joining

- (North Macedonia) Martin Popovski (RW) from (Switzerland) GC Amicitia Zürich
- (Serbia) Nikola Perić (GK) from (Serbia) RK Radnički Kragujevac
- (Germany) David Knezević (LB) from (Switzerland) TSV St. Otmar St. Gallen
- (Poland) Oskar Witczak (LP) from (Poland) SMS Kwidzyn
- (Switzerland) Raphael Rohr (RB) from (Switzerland) Handball Emmen
- (Switzerland) Luc Honegger (CB) from (Switzerland) Handball Stäfa

Leaving

- (Switzerland) Joël Willecke (LP) to (Germany) TBV Lemgo
- (Switzerland) Jannis Scheidiger (GK) to (Switzerland) HC Kriens-Luzern
- (Switzerland) (Ukraine) Daniel Parkhomenko (RB) to (Switzerland) Pfadi Winterthur
- (Switzerland) Jonas Kalt (LB) to (Switzerland) BSV Bern

Transfers for the 2024–25 season

Joining

- (Croatia) Ivan Herceg (GK) from (Croatia) RK Ribola Kaštela
- (Switzerland) Seya Grau (LP) from (Switzerland) HSG Baden-Endingen

Leaving

- (Croatia) Filip Begić (LB) (retires)
- (Slovenia) Leonard Pejkovic (LP) to (Switzerland) HSG Ehrendingen Celtics
- (Switzerland) Gian Attenhofer (RW) to (Germany) ThSV Eisenach
- (Switzerland) Lars Hofer (RW) to (Switzerland) Wacker Thun
- (Switzerland) Nicolas Waldvogel (LB) loan back to (Switzerland) Kadetten Schaffhausen

Transfers for the 2023–24 season

Joining

- (Croatia) Filip Begić (LB) from (Switzerland) STV Baden
- (Switzerland) Nicolas Waldvogel (LB) on loan from (Switzerland) Kadetten Schaffhausen

Leaving

- (Hungary) Rudolf Faluvégi (LB) to (Switzerland) Wacker Thun
- (Slovakia) Martin Slaninka (LP) to (Germany) TVB Stuttgart

Transfers for the 2022–23 season

Joining

- (Croatia) Marijan Marić (LB) from (Switzerland) GC Amicitia Zürich
- (Slovakia) Patrik Hruščák (RB) on loan from (Slovakia) HK Košice

Leaving

- (Croatia) Marin Durica (GK) to (Slovenia) RD Koper
- (Switzerland) Manuel Zehnder (CB) to (Germany) HC Erlangen
- (Switzerland) Leonard Grazioli (GK) to (Germany) HSG Wetzlar
- (Switzerland) Lukas Laube (LP) to (Switzerland) GC Amicitia Zürich
- (Switzerland) Timothy Reichmuth (LW) to (Germany) ThSV Eisenach
- (Slovakia) Patrik Hruščák (RB) loan back to (Slovakia) HK Košice

Transfers for the 2021–22 season

Joining

- (Hungary) Rudolf Faluvégi (LB) from (France) Cesson Rennes MHB
- (Slovenia) Leonard Pejkovic (LP) from (Switzerland) TV Endingen
- (Croatia) Marin Durica (GK) from (Germany) TuS Ferndorf
- (Portugal) Nuno Silva (CB) from (Portugal) Madeira Andebol SAD

Leaving

- (Czech Republic) David Poloz (RW) to (Switzerland) GC Amicitia Zürich
- (Portugal) Diogo Oliveira (CB) to (Portugal) FC Porto
- (Switzerland) Dylan Brandt (CB) to (Switzerland) RTV 1879 Basel
- (Switzerland) Mathias Müller (LB) to (Switzerland) Handball Stäfa
- (Portugal) Nuno Silva (CB) to (Portugal) Madeira Andebol SAD

== Titles ==
- Swiss SuperCup:
  - Gold: 2020
  - Silver: 2021

== EHF ranking ==
As of 16/10/2025

Rank	Team	Points
155	(North Macedonia) HC Butel Skopje	22
156	(Bosnia and Herzegovina) RK Gračanica	22
157	(Bosnia and Herzegovina) RK Borac Banja Luka	22
158	(Switzerland) HSC Suhr Aarau	22
159	(Czech Republic) HK FCC Město Lovosice	22
160	(Azerbaijan) HC Baki	21
161	(Denmark) TTH Holstebro	21

== Former club members ==
=== Notable former players ===
The list includes players who have played at least once for their national team or spent at least 10 years with the team.

==== Goalkeepers ====
- (Switzerland) Leonard Grazioli (2019–2022)
- (Switzerland) Jannis Scheidiger (2021–2025)
- (Italy) Dario Ferrante (2017–2021)
- (Serbia) Dragan Marjanac (2018–)
- (Serbia) Mihailo Radovanović (2016–2017)
- (Slovakia) Martin Pramuk (2014–2017)

==== Right wingers ====
- (Switzerland) Gian Attenhofer (2020–2024)
- (Czech Republic) David Poloz (2018–2021)
- (North Macedonia) Martin Popovski (2025–)

==== Line players ====
- (Switzerland) Lukas Laube (2016–2022)
- (Switzerland) Joël Willecke (2019–2025)
- (Czech Republic) Martin Prachař (2015–2019)
- (Slovakia) Martin Slaninka (2017–2024)

==== Left backs ====
- (Czech Republic) Milan Skvaril (2017–2020)
- (Hungary) Rudolf Faluvégi (2022–2023)

==== Central backs ====
- (Switzerland) Andrija Pendic (2010–2011)
- (Switzerland) Manuel Zehnder (2016–2022)
- (Montenegro) Mirko Milašević (2011–2012)

==== Right backs ====
- (Slovakia) Patrik Hruščák (2022)
- (Portugal) João Ferraz (2019–)
- (Serbia) Đorđe Golubović (2016–2017)

=== Former coaches ===
Seasons	Coach	Country
2016–2021	Misha Kaufmann	(Switzerland)
2021–	Aleksandar Stevic	(Germany) (Serbia)
