= TSV St. Otmar St. Gallen =

Swiss handball club

- Full name: Turn- und Sportverein St. Otmar St. Gallen
- Short name: TSV
- Founded: 1942; 84 years ago
- Arena: Sportanlage Kreuzbleiche
- Capacity: 4,200
- President: Alex Hüttenmoser
- Head coach: Michael Suter
- League: Quickline Handball League
- 2023-24: 6th
- Club colours
| Home | Away |

TSV St. Otmar St. Gallen is a Swiss handball team located in St. Gallen. Their home matches are played at the Kreuzbleiche-Halle. They compete in Swiss Handball League.

== History ==
The team was founded in 1924 as a Catholic youth team, and was named after Saint Othmar, a catholic monk from the 8th century. The team started playing indoor handball in 1950 In 1951 they were promoted to the 1. for the first time, and in 1957 they were promoted to the Nationalliga 1, the top league. In 1961 they won their first Swiss championship in field handball. In 1971 they won their first national championship in indoor handball. In 1982 they surprisingly reached the final of the European Cup, where they lost the final to Hungarian Honvéd Budapest 49-34 on aggregate.

They were relegated for the first time in 1992, but promoted the season after.

In 2010 the women's team was dispanded due to financial difficulties.

Location of TSV St. Otmar St. Gallen

== Kits ==
HOME
| 2013–15 | 2015–17 | 2019– |

AWAY

2019–

== Sports Hall information ==
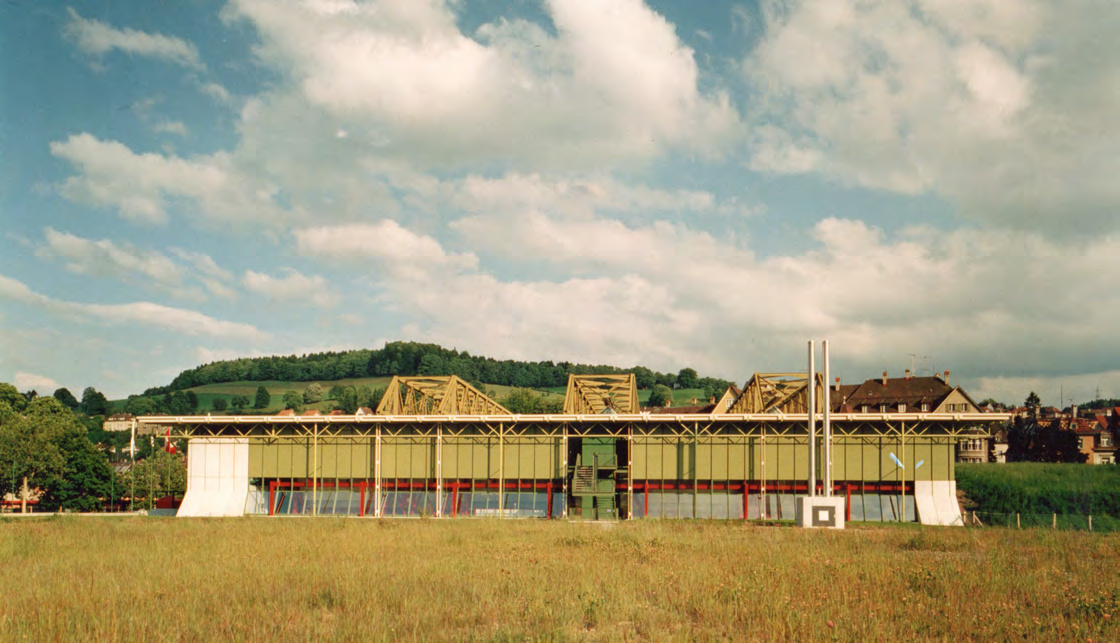
Home hall: Sportanlage Kreuzbleiche

- Name: – Sportanlage Kreuzbleiche
- City: – St. Gallen
- Capacity: – 4200
- Address: – Bogenstrasse 10. 9000 St. Gallen, Switzerland

== Accomplishments ==
=== Men's Handball ===
- Swiss Handball League:
  - Winners (7) : 1971, 1973, 1974, 1981, 1982, 1986, 2001
- Swiss Field Handball League:
  - Winners (5) : 1964, 1968, 1969, 1970, 1971
- Swiss Handball Cup:
  - Winners (4) : 1980, 1981, 2000, 2001
- Swiss Field Handball Cup:
  - Winners (4) : 1961, 1968, 1971, 1972
- European Champions Cup:
  - Runner-Up (1) : 1982
- EHF Cup:
  - Semifinalist (2) : 1988, 2009
- EHF Challenge Cup:
  - Semifinalist (1) : 2005

=== Women's Handball ===
- Swiss Handball League
  - Winners (3) : 1998, 1999, 2005
- Swiss Handball Cup:
  - Winners (2) : 2000, 2007

== European record ==
| Season | Competition | Round | Club | 1st leg | 2nd leg | Aggregate |
|---|---|---|---|---|---|---|
| 2016–17 | Challenge Cup | R3 | (Lithuania) Dragūnas Klaipėda | 35–28 | 28–24 | 63–52 |
| 2016–17 | Challenge Cup | 1/8 | (Slovakia) HKM Sala | 27–30 | 28–27 | 55–57 |

== Team ==
=== Current squad ===
Squad for the 2024–25 season

Goalkeepers

- 1 (Sweden) Andreas Björkman
- 12 (Switzerland) Noah Küffer
- 16 (Switzerland) Noé Hottinger

Left wingers

- 5 (Switzerland) Andrin Dörwaldt
- 9 (Switzerland) Simon Locher
- 24 (Switzerland) Andrin Schneider

Right wingers

- 2 (Switzerland) Noah Bolt
- 7 (Switzerland) Francesco Ardielli

Line players

- 6 (Switzerland) Jan Brülisauer
- 13 (Sweden) Carl Löfström
- 17 (Switzerland) Gregor Rilak

Left backs

- 3 (Germany) David Knezevic
- 4 (Switzerland) Maël Tobler
- 8 (Switzerland) Moritz Heinl
- 14 (Belarus) Hleb Harbuz

Central backs

- 10 (Sweden) Marcus Stroustrup
- 18 (Switzerland) Justin Kürsteiner
- 21 (Germany) Alexander Möller

Right backs

- 15 (Germany) Max Höning
- 23 (Germany) Joschua Braun

=== Transfers ===
Transfers for the 2025–26 season

Joining

- (Portugal) Miguel Alfredo Silva Alves (RW) from (Portugal) Águas Santas
- (Faroe Islands) Aleksandar Lacok (GK) from (Sweden) Lugi HF
- (Switzerland) Tobias Wetzel (LP) from (Denmark) HØJ Elite

Leaving

- (Belarus) Hleb Harbuz (LB) to (Israel) Maccabi Tel Aviv
- (Germany) David Knezević (LB) to (Switzerland) HSC Suhr Aarau
