= BSV Bern =

Swiss handball club

- Full name: Ball Spiel Verein Bern
- Short name: BSV
- Founded: 1959; 67 years ago
- Arena: Mobiliar Arena, Gümligen
- Capacity: 2,350
- President: Anton Gäumann
- Head coach: Martin Rubin
- League: Quickline Handball League
- Club colours

BSV Bern is a Swiss professional handball team located in Bern, that plays in the Quickline Handball League.

Location of BSV Bern

== History ==
The club was founded in 1951. The club was founded by Emil Horle. The team was promoted to the first division in the 1959/60 season. The following year, the team became champions. In the 1979/80 season, the team won the Swiss championship title undefeated. No other team has managed to achieve this so far. BSV became champion again in the 1984/85 season. At the end of the 1998/99 season, the team was relegated from the first division after 39 years. In 2003, they reached the top flight again and have been playing there ever since. In 2002, BSV merged with Handball Muri Bern and continued under the name BSV Bern Muri. In 2018, they decided to go under the name BSV Bern again.

== Crest, colours, supporters ==
=== Club crest ===
Old Logo
(-2018)

New Logo
(2018–present)

=== Kits ===
HOME
2016–17	2017–18	2020–21

AWAY
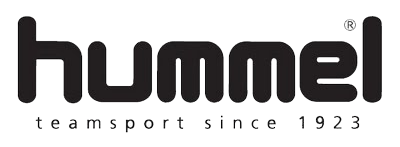
2018–19

== Sports Hall information ==
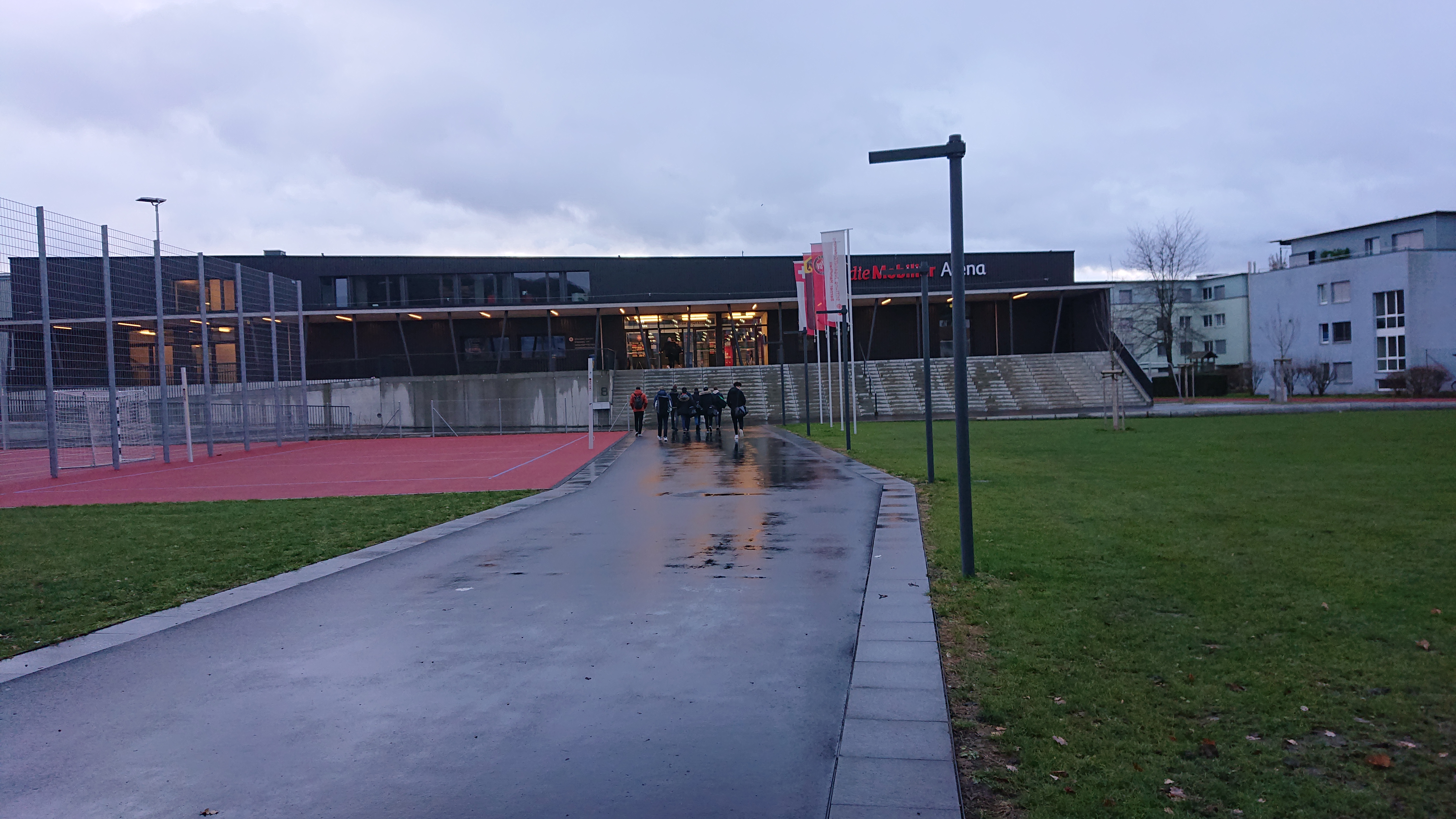
Home hall: Mobiliar Arena

- Arena: - Mobiliar Arena
- City: - Gümligen
- Capacity: - 2350
- Address: - Rohrmattstrasse 12, 3073 Gümligen, Switzerland

== Management ==
Position	Name
President	(Switzerland) Anton Gäumann
Sport Director	(Switzerland) Guido Frei
Club manager	(Switzerland) Pascale Tiefenbach

== Team ==
=== Current squad ===
Squad for the 2023–24 season

BSV Bern

Goalkeepers

- 1 (Switzerland) Fabio Brändle
- 12 (Switzerland) Dario Ferrante
- 16 (Switzerland) Mathieu Seravalli
- 30 (Switzerland) Aurel Bringolf (c)

Left Wingers

- 3 (Switzerland) Daniel Weingartner
- 4 (Switzerland) Nik Jauer
- 19 (Switzerland) Marco Strahm

Right Wingers

- 9 (Switzerland) Simon Getzmann
- 18 (Switzerland) Levin Wanner
- 26 (Switzerland) Jan Allemann

Line Players

- 20 (Sweden) Hannes Nyström
- 22 (Switzerland) Matthias Widmer
- 23 (Switzerland) Kaspar Arn
- 77 (Switzerland) Mats Hirt

Left Backs

- 6 (Germany) Dominik Weiss
- 15 (Switzerland) Samuel Weingartner
- 21 (Switzerland) Lucas Rohr
- 25 (Switzerland) Ivan Corluka
- 34 (Kosovo) Ardin Berisha
- 96 (Switzerland) Gabriel Ottrubay

Central Backs

- 2 (Switzerland) Nico Eggimann
- 5 (Switzerland) Timo Lüthi
- 8 (Switzerland) Tobias Spring
- 11 (Switzerland) Felix Aellen

Right Backs

- 13 (Switzerland) Michael Kusio
- 24 (Switzerland) Destiny Oyamendan
- 28 (Switzerland) Claudio Vögtli
- 52 (Switzerland) Sandro Gantner

=== Technical staff ===
- Head coach: (Switzerland) Martin Rubin
- Assistant coach: (Switzerland) David Staudenmann
- Goalkeeping coach: (Switzerland) Antoine Ebinger
- Fitness coach: (Switzerland) Matthias Heger
- Physiotherapist: (Switzerland) Jonas Engel

=== Transfers ===
Transfers for the 2026–27 season

Joining

- (Switzerland) Lenny Rubin (LB) from (Germany) TVB Stuttgart
- (Switzerland) Nils Kiener (RW) from (Switzerland) Wacker Thun

Leaving

- (Switzerland) Michael Kusio (RB) to (France) USAM Nîmes Gard
- (Switzerland) Levin Wanner (RW) to (Germany) TBV Lemgo
- (Switzerland) Lenny Rubin (LB) to (Germany) TBV Lemgo
- (Switzerland) Mathieu Seravalli (GK) to (Switzerland) Kadetten Schaffhausen

=== Transfer History ===
Transfers for the 2025–26 season

Joining

- (Switzerland) Jonas Kalt (LB) from (Switzerland) HSC Suhr Aarau
- (Switzerland) Luc Stettler (CB) from (Switzerland) TV Steffisburg

Leaving

- (Germany) Dominik Weiss (LB) to (Germany) HC Oppenweiler/Backnang
- (Switzerland) Felix Aellen (CB) to (Germany) ThSV Eisenach
- (Switzerland) Claudio Vögtli (RB) to (Switzerland) RTV 1879 Basel

Transfers for the 2023–24 season

Joining

- (Germany) Dominik Weiss (LB) from (Germany) VfL Lübeck-Schwartau
- (Switzerland) Levin Wanner (RW) from (Switzerland) HC Kriens-Luzern
- (Switzerland) Daniel Weingartner (LW) from (Switzerland) BSV Stans
- (Switzerland) Michael Kusio (RB) from (Switzerland) Kadetten Schaffhausen

Leaving

- (Croatia) Ante Kaleb (CB) to (Switzerland) GC Amicitia Zürich
- (Sweden) Pontus Zetterman (RB) to (Sweden) Önnereds HK

== Titles ==
- Quickline Handball League
  - Winner (3) : 1961, 1980, 1985

== EHF ranking ==
As of 5/12/2025

Rank	Team	Points
107	(Kosovo) KH Besa Famgas	44
108	(France) USAM Nîmes	44
109	(Luxembourg) Red Boys Differdange	42
110	(Switzerland) BSV Bern	42
111	(Romania) HC Buzău	41
112	(Azerbaijan) Kur	40
113	(Austria) Bregenz Handball	30

== Former club members ==
=== Notable former players ===
- (Switzerland) Marc Baumgartner (1987–1994, 2005–2006)
- (Switzerland) Aurel Bringolf (2022–)
- (Switzerland) Antoine Ebinger (2007–2019)
- (Switzerland) Martin Friedli (2006–2007)
- (Switzerland) Thomas Furer (1999–2003, 2011–2012)
- (Switzerland) Thomas Gautschi (1996–1997)
- (Switzerland) Alen Milosevic (2007–2013)
- (Switzerland) Nikola Portner (2010–2014)
- (Switzerland) Severin Ramseier (2012–2014)
- (Switzerland) Samuel Röthlisberger (2011–2017)
- (Switzerland) Levin Wanner (2023–)
- (Croatia) Mario Cvitković (2020–2022)
- (Croatia) Ante Kaleb (2019–2023)
- (Croatia) Nikola Kedžo (2016–2017)
- (Czech Republic) Václav Lanča (2002)
- (Czech Republic) Martin Prachař (2011–2015)
- (Czech Republic) Jakub Szymanski (2016–2019)
- (Germany) Dominik Weiß (2023–)
- (South Korea) Han Kyung-tai (2003–2007)
- (Portugal) Pedro Spínola (2017–2020)
- (Serbia) Dragan Marjanac (2011–2018)
- (Serbia) Uroš Mitrović (2013–2019)
- (Serbia) (Switzerland) Zlatko Portner (1994–1997, 1999–2002)
- (Slovakia) Daniel Valo (2003–2005)
- (Sweden) Pontus Zetterman (2021–2023)

=== Former coaches ===
Seasons	Coach	Country
2017–2021	Aleksandar Stevic	(Germany) (Serbia)
2021–	Martin Rubin	(Switzerland)
