= Wacker Thun =

Swiss handball club

- Full name: Wacker Thun
- Short name: Wacker
- Founded: 1961; 65 years ago
- Arena: Sporthalle Lachen
- Capacity: 2,000
- President: Andreas Kübli
- Head coach: Remo Badertscher
- League: Quickline Handball League
- 2024-25: 8th
- Club colours
Home	Away

Wacker Thun is a handball club from Thun, Switzerland. Wacker Thun competes in Nationalliga A of the Swiss Handball League.

Location of Wacker Thun

== Kits ==
HOME
2011–14	2015–18	2019-

AWAY
2011–12	2016–17	2019-

== Team ==
=== Current squad ===
Squad for the 2026–27 season

Goalkeepers

- (Switzerland) Leo Ebner

Left Wingers

- (Croatia) Juro Čakarić
- (Switzerland) Gregory Lädrach

Right Wingers
Line players

Left Backs
Central Backs
Right Backs

=== Transfers ===
Transfers for the 2026–27 season

Joining

Leaving

- (Switzerland) Nils Kiener (RW) to (Switzerland) BSV Bern

=== Transfer History ===
Transfers for the 2025–26 season

Joining

- (Croatia) Juro Čakarić (LW) from (Croatia) HRK Gorica
- (Switzerland) Leo Ebner (GK) from (Switzerland) TV Steffisburg
- (Switzerland) Gregory Lädrach (LW) from (Switzerland) TV Steffisburg

Leaving

- (Hungary) Rudolf Faluvégi (LB) (retires)
- (Czech Republic) Martin Kocich (CB) to (Czech Republic) SKKP Handball Brno
- (Switzerland) Lars Hofer (RW) to (Switzerland) RTV 1879 Basel

== Achievements ==
- 1 EHF European Cup: 2005
- 2 Swiss Handball League: 2013, 2018
- 3 Swiss Cup: 2002, 2006, 2012

== European record ==
Season	Competition	Round	Club	1st leg	2nd leg	Aggregate
2016–17	EHF Cup	R2	(Ukraine) ZTR Zaporizhia	22–23	22–22	44–45
