= Swiss Handball League =

- Current season, competition or edition: 2025–26 Swiss Handball League
- Sport: Handball
- Founded: 1950
- Country: Switzerland
- Confederation: EHF
- Most recent champion: HC Kriens-Luzern (2025–26)
- Level on pyramid: 1 and 2
- International cups: EHF European League; EHF European Cup

The Swiss Handball League (SHL) is the name of the professional handball league of Switzerland. It is divided into two divisions:

- Quickline Handball League
- Nationalliga B

== Current season ==
=== Teams for season 2024–25 ===
Location of teams in 2024–25 Quickline Handball League
- BSV Bern
- GC Amicitia Zürich
- HC Kriens-Luzern
- HSC Suhr Aarau
- Kadetten Schaffhausen
- Pfadi Winterthur
- HSC Kreuzlingen
- TSV St. Otmar St. Gallen
- Wacker Thun
- RTV 1879 Basel

== 2016/17 Season ==
=== Nationalliga A ===
- BSV Bern
- HC Kriens-Luzern
- HSC Suhr Aarau
- Kadetten Schaffhausen
- Pfadi Winterthur
- RTV 1879 Basel
- GC Amicitia Zürich
- TSV Fortitudo Gossau
- TSV St. Otmar St. Gallen
- Wacker Thun

=== Nationalliga B ===
- CS Chênois Genève
- HC KTV Altdorf
- HC Wädenswil
- HSG Siggenthal
- Lakers Stäfa
- SG Horgen
- SG TV Solothurn
- Pfadi Espoirs
- STV Baden
- Kadetten Schaffhausen II
- TV Endingen
- TV Möhlin
- TV Steffisburg

== Nationalliga A Champions ==
- 1950: Grasshopper Club Zürich
- 1951: Grasshopper Club Zürich (2)
- 1952: Grasshopper Club Zürich (3)
- 1953: STV Rorschach
- 1954: Grasshopper Club Zürich (4)
- 1955: Grasshopper Club Zürich (5)
- 1956: Grasshopper Club Zürich (6)
- 1957: Grasshopper Club Zürich (7)
- 1958: BTV St. Gallen
- 1959: BTV St. Gallen (2)
- 1960: RTV 1879 Basel
- 1961: BSV Bern
- 1962: Grasshopper Club Zürich (8)
- 1963: Grasshopper Club Zürich (9)
- 1964: Grasshopper Club Zürich (10)
- 1965: Grasshopper Club Zürich (11)
- 1966: Grasshopper Club Zürich (12)
- 1967: ATV Basel-Stadt
- 1968: Grasshopper Club Zürich (13)
- 1969: Grasshopper Club Zürich (14)
- 1970: Grasshopper Club Zürich (15)
- 1971: TSV St. Otmar St. Gallen
- 1972: ATV Basel-Stadt (2)
- 1973: TSV St. Otmar St. Gallen (2)
- 1974: TSV St. Otmar St. Gallen (3)
- 1975: Grasshopper Club Zürich (16)
- 1976: Grasshopper Club Zürich (17)
- 1977: Grasshopper Club Zürich (18)
- 1978: TV Zofingen
- 1979: Grasshopper Club Zürich (19)
- 1980: BSV Bern (2)
- 1981: TSV St. Otmar St. Gallen (4)
- 1982: TSV St. Otmar St. Gallen (5)
- 1983: TV Zofingen (2)
- 1984: RTV 1879 Basel (2)
- 1985: BSV Bern (3)
- 1986: TSV St. Otmar St. Gallen (6)
- 1987: ZMC Amicitia Zürich
- 1988: ZMC Amicitia Zürich (2)
- 1989: ZMC Amicitia Zürich (3)
- 1990: Grasshopper Club Zürich (20)
- 1991: Grasshopper Club Zürich (21)
- 1992: Pfadi Winterthur
- 1993: BSV Borba Luzern
- 1994: Pfadi Winterthur (2)
- 1995: Pfadi Winterthur (3)
- 1996: Pfadi Winterthur (4)
- 1997: Pfadi Winterthur (5)
- 1998: Pfadi Winterthur (6)
- 1999: TV Suhr
- 2000: TV Suhr (2)
- 2001: TSV St. Otmar St. Gallen (7)
- 2002: Pfadi Winterthur (7)
- 2003: Pfadi Winterthur (8)
- 2004: Pfadi Winterthur (9)
- 2005: Kadetten Schaffhausen
- 2006: Kadetten Schaffhausen (2)
- 2007: Kadetten Schaffhausen (3)
- 2008: ZMC Amicitia Zürich (4)
- 2009: ZMC Amicitia Zürich (5)
- 2010: Kadetten Schaffhausen (4)
- 2011: Kadetten Schaffhausen (5)
- 2012: Kadetten Schaffhausen (6)
- 2013: Wacker Thun
- 2014: Kadetten Schaffhausen (7)
- 2015: Kadetten Schaffhausen (8)
- 2016: Kadetten Schaffhausen (9)
- 2017: Kadetten Schaffhausen (10)
- 2018: Wacker Thun (2)
- 2019: Kadetten Schaffhausen (11)
- 2020: No champion due to the COVID-19 pandemic
- 2021: Pfadi Winterthur (10)
- 2022: Kadetten Schaffhausen (12)
- 2023: Kadetten Schaffhausen (13)
- 2024: Kadetten Schaffhausen (14)
- 2025: Kadetten Schaffhausen (15)
- 2026: HC Kriens-Luzern

	Club	Titles	Year
1.	Grasshopper Club Zürich	21	1950, 1951, 1952, 1954, 1955, 1956, 1957, 1962, 1963, 1964, 1965, 1966, 1968, 1969, 1970, 1975, 1976, 1977, 1979, 1990, 1991
2.	Kadetten Schaffhausen	15	2005, 2006, 2007, 2010, 2011, 2012, 2014, 2015, 2016, 2017, 2019, 2022, 2023, 2024, 2025
3.	Pfadi Winterthur	10	1992, 1994, 1995, 1996, 1997, 1998, 2002, 2003, 2004, 2021
4.	TSV St. Otmar St. Gallen	7	1971, 1973, 1974, 1981, 1982, 1986, 2001
5.	ZMC Amicitia Zürich	5	1987, 1988, 1989, 2008, 2009
6.	BSV Bern	3	1961, 1980, 1985
7.	ATV Basel-Stadt	2	1967, 1972
	RTV 1879 Basel	2	1960, 1984
	BTV St. Gallen	2	1958, 1959
	TV Zofingen	2	1978, 1983
	TV Suhr	2	1999, 2000
	Wacker Thun	2	2013, 2018
13.	BSV Borba Luzern	1	1993
	HC Kriens-Luzern	1	2026
	STV Rorschach	1	1953

== EHF coefficient ranking ==
For season 2015/2016, see footnote

- 9. (14) (Sweden) Elitserien (36.33)
- 10. (12) (Belarus) Chempiyanat 1 (33.90)
- 11. (8) (Switzerland) Swiss Handball League (33.00)
- 12. (13) (Romania) Liga Națională (32.80)
- 13. (9) Premier League of Croatia (32.11)

== See also ==
- SPAR Premium League
