= RTV 1879 Basel =

Swiss handball club

- Full name: Realschüler-Turnverein 1879 Basel
- Short name: RTV
- Founded: April 28, 1879; 147 years ago
- Arena: Basel Rankhof
- Capacity: 1,500
- Head coach: Ike Cotrina
- League: Quickline Handball League
- 2024-25: 10th
- Club colours
Home	Away

RTV 1879 Basel is a Swiss multi-sports club, that has a handball team and a volleyball team. It is located in Basel. Their home matches are played at the Sportzentrum Rankhof.

The team was founded in 1879 as «Realschüler-Turnverein Basel». Their most successful year was 1983-84, when both the men's and women's handball team won their respective championships.

Location of RTV 1879 Basel

== Kits ==
HOME
2013–14	2014–15	2017–18	2019–

AWAY
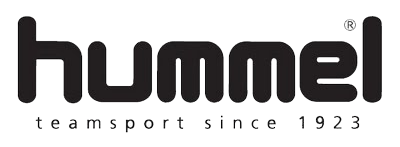
2019–

== Team ==
=== Current squad ===
Squad for the 2025–26 season

Goalkeepers
Left Wingers

- (France) Arthur Jund

Right Wingers

- (Spain) Sergi Franco Miró

Line players

Left Backs
Central Backs

- (Denmark) Christian Sabroe Holm

Right Backs

- (Switzerland) Claudio Vögtli

=== Transfers ===
Transfers for the 2026–27 season

Joining

- (Spain) Sergi Franco Miró (RW) from (Spain) BM Granollers
- (France) Arthur Jund (LW) from (France) ASPTT Mulhouse/Rixheim

Leaving

=== Transfer History ===
Transfers for the 2025–26 season

Joining

- (Denmark) Christian Sabroe Holm (CB) from (Denmark) Lemvig-Thyborøn Håndbold
- (Switzerland) Claudio Vögtli (RB) from (Switzerland) BSV Bern

Leaving

== Accomplishments ==
- Swiss Handball League:
  - Winners (2) : 1960, 1984
- Swiss Women's Handball League:
  - Winners (2) : 1981, 1984
