= Johan Petersson (handballer) =

Swedish handball player (born 1973)

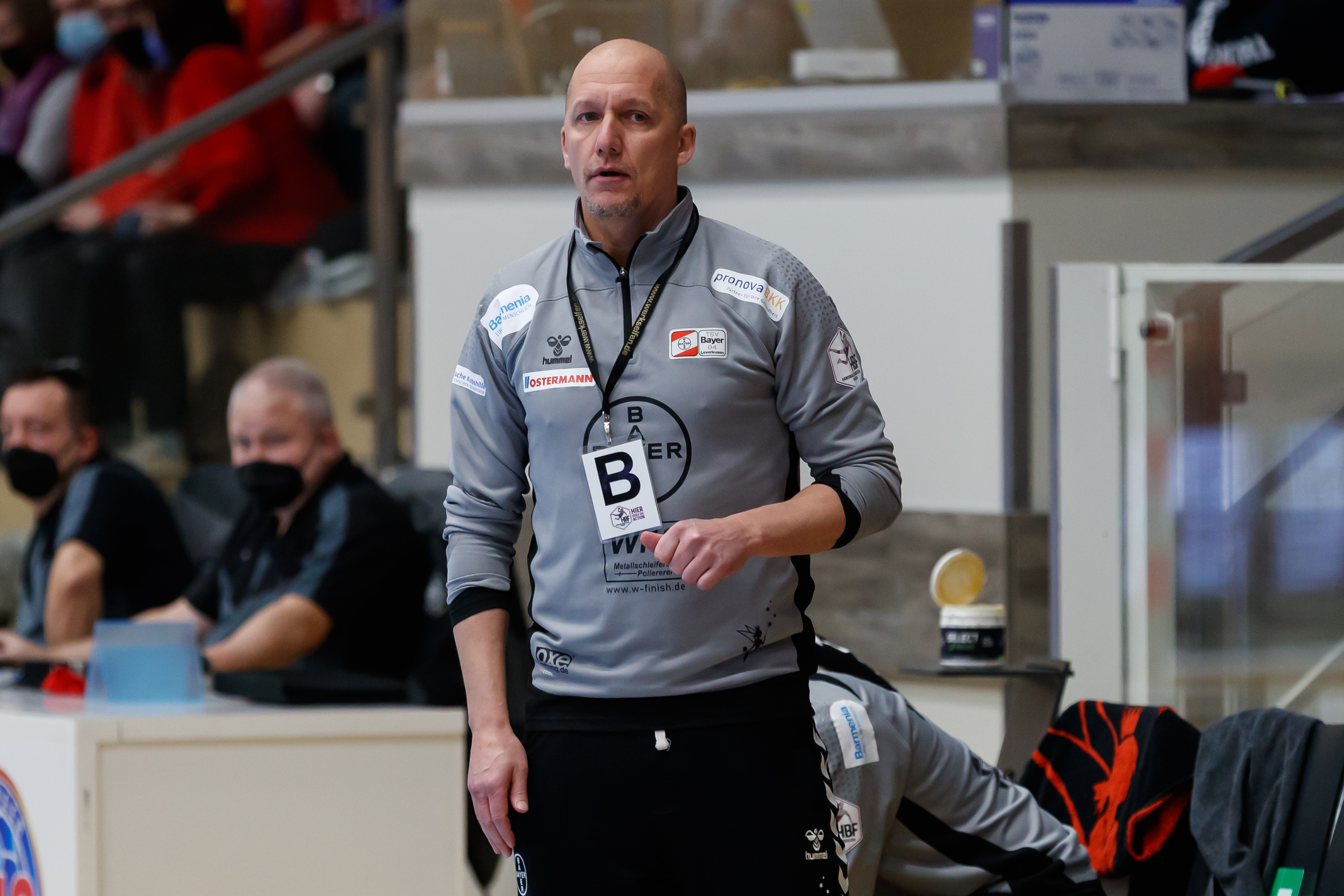
- Johan Petersson (2022)

Personal information
- Full name: Pär Johan Petersson
- Nationality: Swedish
- Born: 29 March 1973 (age 53) Karlshamn, Sweden
- Height: 1.81 m (5 ft 11 in)

Sport
- Sport: Handball
- Position: Right wing
- Current club: Retired

Youth career
- Years: Team
- 1990-1992: IK Sävehof

Senior clubs
- Years: Team
- 1992-1996: IK Sävehof
- 1996-1997: GWD Minden
- 1997-2001: HSG Nordhorn
- 2001-2005: THW Kiel
- 2005-2008: IF Hallby Handboll
- 2008-2010: Alingsås HK
- 2010-2011: IFK Kristianstad
- 2012: TuS N-Lübbecke
- 2015: HSV Hamburg
National team
Years	Team	Apps	(Gls)
1993-2008	Sweden	250	(815)

Teams managed
- 2005-2008: IF Hallby Handboll
- 2017: HSV Norderstedt
- 2018-2019: Kungälvs HK (assistant)
- 2019-2021: Kärra HF (women)
- 2021: BK Heid (women)
- 2021-2023: Bayer 04 Leverkusen (women)
- 2023-: Alingsås HK (women)
Medal record
Olympic Games
Silver medal – second place	1996 Atlanta	Team
Silver medal – second place	2000 Sydney	Team
World Championship
Gold medal – first place	1999 Egypt
Silver medal – second place	1997 Japan
Silver medal – second place	2001 France
Bronze medal – third place	1995 Iceland
European Championship
Gold medal – first place	1994 Portugal
Gold medal – first place	1998 Italy
Gold medal – first place	2000 Croatia
Gold medal – first place	2002 Sweden

Pär Johan Petersson (born 29 March 1973) is a Swedish former handball player and current handball coach. He won the 1999 World Championship and the European Championship four times with the Swedish national team. He also competed in the 1996 Summer Olympics and in the 2000 Summer Olympics, where Sweden won silver medals both times.

== Career ==
Petersson started playing handball at IK Sävehof, where he debuted for the senior team in 1990 in the Elitserien. His best results here were two second places in 1993 and 1994. In 1996 he became a professional player at the German club GWD Minden, where he signed on a bosman transfer, which was a new phenomenon in Handball. Here he played for one season before joining HSG Nordhorn, where he played with several national team colleagues including Ola Lindgren. After 4 years he joined THW Kiel, where he once again played with a number of Swedish national team players, including Magnus Wislander, Staffan Olsson and Stefan Lövgren. Here he won the German Championship in 2002 and 2005 and the EHF Cup Winners' Cup in 2002 and 2004.

When he played for IF Hallby Handboll he acted as the player-coach. Here he barely missed promotion to the top division, the Elitserien. In 2008 he joined Alingsås HK. Here he won the Swedish championship in 2009. A year later he retired, but returned in the 2010–2011 season to join IFK Kristianstad.

In April 2012 he made a second comeback when he joined German side TuS N-Lübbecke for the last match of the season and the final four. In 2015 he made his third comeback for HSV Hamburg to replace the injured Hans Lindberg und Stefan Schröder. But in his first game he ruptured his achilles tendon.

=== National team ===
He debuted for the Swedish national team in 1993 against Estonia.

In 1996, he was a member of the Swedish handball team won the silver medal in the Olympic tournament. He played two matches and scored 13 goals.

At the 1999 World Championship and the 2000 European Championship he won gold medals with the Swedish team. He was selected for the all star team on both occasions.

In 2000, he was part of the Swedish team which won the Olympic silver medal again. He played four matches and scored 16 goals.

In 2002 he once again won the European Championship.

He retired from the national team after the 2008 European Championship in Norway.

== Coaching career ==
In 2017 he took over the coaching duties at the German third-tier side HSV Norderstedt. In the 2018-19 he was the assistant coach at the Swedish second-tier side Kungälvs HK. The season after he became the head coach at the Kärra HF women's team in the second tier. In 2021 he was promoted with the club to the top division. He resigned only days later.

In 2021 he was the head coach at BK Heid for just under two months. He left in December 2021 to join the Handball-Bundesliga side Bayer 04 Leverkusen.

In 2023 he left Leverkusen and returned to Sweden to take over at Alingsås HK.

== Results ==
- German Champion 2002 and 2005
- Swedish Champion 2009
- EHF Cup Winners' Cup: 2002 und 2004
- European Champion: 2000 and 2002
- Olympic silver medals: 1996 and 2000
- World Champion 1999
- 2nd place 1997 and 2001 world championships, 3rd place World championship 1995

== Other positions ==
Petersson has been the editor-in-chief at the now defunct handball magazine Handbollsmagasinet.
