= 2002 European Men's Handball Championship =

2002 edition of the European Men's Handball Championship

Tournament details
- Host country: Sweden
- Venues: 6 (in 6 host cities)
- Dates: 25 January – 3 February
- Teams: 16 (from 1 confederation)

Final positions
- Champions: Sweden (4th title)
- Runners-up: Germany
- Third place: Denmark
- Fourth place: Iceland

Tournament statistics
- Matches played: 50
- Goals scored: 2,609 (52.18 per match)
- Top scorers: (Iceland) Ólafur Stefánsson (58 goals)

Awards
- Best player: (Sweden) Magnus Wislander

The 2002 Men's European Handball Championship was the fifth edition of the tournament and took place from 25 January to 3 February 2002 in Sweden. Sweden won the tournament for a third time in a row, and fourth time overall.

== Qualification ==
Country	Qualified as	Previous appearances in tournament
Sweden	Host, defending champion	4 (**1994**, 1996, **1998**, **2000**)
France	Semifinalist of 2000 European Championship	4 (1994, 1996, 1998, 2000)
Russia	Semifinalist of 2000 European Championship	4 (1994, **1996**, 1998, 2000)
Spain	Semifinalist of 2000 European Championship	4 (1994, 1996, 1998, 2000)
Slovenia	Fifth place of 2000 European Championship	3 (1994, 1996, 2000)
Croatia	Playoff winner	4 (1994, 1996, 1998, 2000)
Czech Republic	Playoff winner	2 (1996, 1998)
Denmark	Playoff winner	3 (1994, 1996, 2000)
Germany	Playoff winner	4 (1994, 1996, 1998, 2000)
Iceland	Playoff winner	1 (2000)
Israel	Playoff winner	0 (Debut)
Poland	Playoff winner	0 (Debut)
Portugal	Playoff winner	2 (1994, 2000)
Switzerland	Playoff winner	0 (Debut)
Ukraine	Playoff winner	1 (2000)
Yugoslavia	Playoff winner	2 (1996, 1998)

Note: Bold indicates champion for that year. Italic indicates host for that year.

== Venues ==
Group	City	Stadium	Capacity
A and I	Gothenburg	Scandinavium	12.000
B	Helsingborg	Idrottens Hus	2.700
C	Skövde	Arena Skövde	2.500
D	Jönköping	Kinnarps Arena	7.000
II	Västerås	Västeråshallen	5.000
Final round	Stockholm	Globen Arena	14.500

== Preliminary round ==
All times are local (UTC+1).

=== Group A ===
Pos	Team	Pld	W	D	L	GF	GA	GD	Pts	Qualification
1	Sweden (H)	3	3	0	0	86	63	+23	6	Main round
2	Czech Republic	3	2	0	1	77	82	−5	4	Main round
3	Ukraine	3	1	0	2	78	80	−2	2	Main round
4	Poland	3	0	0	3	67	83	−16	0	

Source: EHF
Rules for classification: 1) points; 2) head-to-head points; 3) head-to-head goal difference; 4) head-to-head number of goals scored; 5) goal difference.
(H) Hosts

25 January 2002; 18:00	Poland	24–25	Czech Republic	Scandinavium, Gothenburg; Attendance: 8,400; Referees: Falcone, Rätz (SUI)
25 January 2002; 18:00	Jurasik 8	(9–11)	Laclavik 5	Scandinavium, Gothenburg; Attendance: 8,400; Referees: Falcone, Rätz (SUI)
25 January 2002; 18:00	3× (yellow card) 3× (suspension)	Report	3× (yellow card) 8× (suspension)	Scandinavium, Gothenburg; Attendance: 8,400; Referees: Falcone, Rätz (SUI)

25 January 2002; 20:00	Sweden	27–21	Ukraine	Scandinavium, Gothenburg; Attendance: 11,300; Referees: Nachevski, Nachevski (MKD)
25 January 2002; 20:00	Lövgren 12	(11–9)	Kostetskiy 5	Scandinavium, Gothenburg; Attendance: 11,300; Referees: Nachevski, Nachevski (MKD)
25 January 2002; 20:00	3× (yellow card) 4× (suspension)	Report	3× (yellow card) 5× (suspension) 1× (red card)	Scandinavium, Gothenburg; Attendance: 11,300; Referees: Nachevski, Nachevski (MKD)

26 January 2002; 17:00	Czech Republic	22–31	Sweden	Scandinavium, Gothenburg; Attendance: 11,400; Referees: Breto, Huelin (ESP)
26 January 2002; 17:00	Berka 7	(12–14)	Frändesjö 8	Scandinavium, Gothenburg; Attendance: 11,400; Referees: Breto, Huelin (ESP)
26 January 2002; 17:00	3× (yellow card) 4× (suspension)	Report	4× (yellow card) 4× (suspension)	Scandinavium, Gothenburg; Attendance: 11,400; Referees: Breto, Huelin (ESP)

26 January 2002; 19:00	Ukraine	30–23	Poland	Scandinavium, Gothenburg; Attendance: 5,700; Referees: Lemme, Ullrich (GER)
26 January 2002; 19:00	Velyky 9	(13–13)	four players 4	Scandinavium, Gothenburg; Attendance: 5,700; Referees: Lemme, Ullrich (GER)
26 January 2002; 19:00	3× (yellow card) 6× (suspension) 1× (red card)	Report	3× (yellow card) 6× (suspension)	Scandinavium, Gothenburg; Attendance: 5,700; Referees: Lemme, Ullrich (GER)

27 January 2002; 16:00	Ukraine	27–30	Czech Republic	Scandinavium, Gothenburg; Attendance: 7,640; Referees: Josić, Rudić (CRO)
27 January 2002; 16:00	Kostetskiy 14	(12–16)	Filip, Radčenko 9	Scandinavium, Gothenburg; Attendance: 7,640; Referees: Josić, Rudić (CRO)
27 January 2002; 16:00	3× (yellow card) 4× (suspension)	Report	3× (yellow card) 6× (suspension) 1× (red card)	Scandinavium, Gothenburg; Attendance: 7,640; Referees: Josić, Rudić (CRO)

27 January 2002; 18:00	Sweden	28–20	Poland	Scandinavium, Gothenburg; Attendance: 11,400; Referees: Klucsó, Lekrinszki (HUN)
27 January 2002; 18:00	Franzén 7	(12–12)	Tkaczyk 7	Scandinavium, Gothenburg; Attendance: 11,400; Referees: Klucsó, Lekrinszki (HUN)
27 January 2002; 18:00	3× (yellow card) 3× (suspension)	Report	3× (yellow card) 5× (suspension)	Scandinavium, Gothenburg; Attendance: 11,400; Referees: Klucsó, Lekrinszki (HUN)

=== Group B ===
Pos	Team	Pld	W	D	L	GF	GA	GD	Pts	Qualification
1	Denmark	3	2	1	0	81	71	+10	5 (Note: Russia 25–25 Denmark)	Main round
2	Russia	3	2	1	0	80	70	+10	5	Main round
3	Portugal	3	1	0	2	65	70	−5	2	Main round
4	Israel	3	0	0	3	67	82	−15	0	

Source: EHF
Rules for classification: 1) points; 2) head-to-head points; 3) head-to-head goal difference; 4) head-to-head number of goals scored; 5) goal difference.
Notes:

25 January 2002; 18:00	Portugal	26–15	Israel	Idrottens Hus, Helsingborg; Attendance: 1,600; Referees: Lemme, Ullrich (GER)
25 January 2002; 18:00	R. Costa 5	(12–6)	Boutenko 5	Idrottens Hus, Helsingborg; Attendance: 1,600; Referees: Lemme, Ullrich (GER)
25 January 2002; 18:00	3× (yellow card) 6× (suspension)	Report	3× (yellow card) 1× (suspension)	Idrottens Hus, Helsingborg; Attendance: 1,600; Referees: Lemme, Ullrich (GER)

25 January 2002; 20:00	Russia	25–25	Denmark	Idrottens Hus, Helsingborg; Attendance: 2,700; Referees: Josić, Rudić (CRO)
25 January 2002; 20:00	Ivanov, Tuchkin 5	(12–13)	Stryger 5	Idrottens Hus, Helsingborg; Attendance: 2,700; Referees: Josić, Rudić (CRO)
25 January 2002; 20:00	3× (yellow card) 6× (suspension)	Report	2× (yellow card) 6× (suspension) 1× (red card)	Idrottens Hus, Helsingborg; Attendance: 2,700; Referees: Josić, Rudić (CRO)

26 January 2002; 15:00	Israel	26–27	Russia	Idrottens Hus, Helsingborg; Attendance: 1,900; Referees: Klucsó, Lekrinszki (HUN)
26 January 2002; 15:00	Maimon 7	(11–16)	Ivanov 6	Idrottens Hus, Helsingborg; Attendance: 1,900; Referees: Klucsó, Lekrinszki (HUN)
26 January 2002; 15:00	3× (yellow card) 5× (suspension)	Report	3× (yellow card) 2× (suspension)	Idrottens Hus, Helsingborg; Attendance: 1,900; Referees: Klucsó, Lekrinszki (HUN)

26 January 2002; 17:00	Denmark	27–20	Portugal	Idrottens Hus, Helsingborg; Attendance: 2,400; Referees: Falcone, Rätz (SUI)
26 January 2002; 17:00	Christiansen 6	(10–10)	Galambas, Resende 5	Idrottens Hus, Helsingborg; Attendance: 2,400; Referees: Falcone, Rätz (SUI)
26 January 2002; 17:00	3× (yellow card) 4× (suspension)	Report	3× (yellow card) 5× (suspension) 1× (red card)	Idrottens Hus, Helsingborg; Attendance: 2,400; Referees: Falcone, Rätz (SUI)

27 January 2002; 15:00	Russia	28–19	Portugal	Idrottens Hus, Helsingborg; Attendance: 1,145; Referees: Nachevski, Nachevski (MKD)
27 January 2002; 15:00	Koksharov, Rastvortsev 7	(17–7)	Coelho 7	Idrottens Hus, Helsingborg; Attendance: 1,145; Referees: Nachevski, Nachevski (MKD)
27 January 2002; 15:00	3× (yellow card) 2× (suspension)	Report	3× (yellow card) 2× (suspension)	Idrottens Hus, Helsingborg; Attendance: 1,145; Referees: Nachevski, Nachevski (MKD)

27 January 2002; 17:00	Denmark	29–26	Israel	Idrottens Hus, Helsingborg; Attendance: 1,810; Referees: Breto, Huelin (ESP)
27 January 2002; 17:00	Christiansen 10	(14–8)	Balsar 10	Idrottens Hus, Helsingborg; Attendance: 1,810; Referees: Breto, Huelin (ESP)
27 January 2002; 17:00	3× (yellow card) 6× (suspension)	Report	3× (yellow card) 7× (suspension) 2× (red card)	Idrottens Hus, Helsingborg; Attendance: 1,810; Referees: Breto, Huelin (ESP)

=== Group C ===
Pos	Team	Pld	W	D	L	GF	GA	GD	Pts	Qualification
1	Iceland	3	2	1	0	88	71	+17	5 (Note: Spain 24–24 Iceland)	Main round
2	Spain	3	2	1	0	73	66	+7	5	Main round
3	Slovenia	3	0	1	2	79	90	−11	1 (Note: Slovenia 34–34 Switzerland)	Main round
4	Switzerland	3	0	1	2	78	91	−13	1	

Source: EHF
Rules for classification: 1) points; 2) head-to-head points; 3) head-to-head goal difference; 4) head-to-head number of goals scored; 5) goal difference.
Notes:

25 January 2002; 18:00	Slovenia	34–34	Switzerland	Arena Skövde, Skövde; Attendance: 2,000; Referees: Goulão, Macau (POR)
25 January 2002; 18:00	Vugrinec 12	(18–16)	Kostadinovich 7	Arena Skövde, Skövde; Attendance: 2,000; Referees: Goulão, Macau (POR)
25 January 2002; 18:00	3× (yellow card) 1× (suspension)	Report	3× (yellow card) 3× (suspension)	Arena Skövde, Skövde; Attendance: 2,000; Referees: Goulão, Macau (POR)

25 January 2002; 20:00	Spain	24–24	Iceland	Arena Skövde, Skövde; Attendance: 2,000; Referees: Migas, Bavas (GRE)
25 January 2002; 20:00	Garralda 6	(9–13)	Stefánsson 7	Arena Skövde, Skövde; Attendance: 2,000; Referees: Migas, Bavas (GRE)
25 January 2002; 20:00	3× (yellow card) 4× (suspension)	Report	3× (yellow card) 8× (suspension)	Arena Skövde, Skövde; Attendance: 2,000; Referees: Migas, Bavas (GRE)

26 January 2002; 17:00	Iceland	31–25	Slovenia	Arena Skövde, Skövde; Attendance: 1,400; Referees: Hansson, Olsson (SWE)
26 January 2002; 17:00	Jóhannesson, Stefánsson 9	(15–11)	Lubej 8	Arena Skövde, Skövde; Attendance: 1,400; Referees: Hansson, Olsson (SWE)
26 January 2002; 17:00	2× (yellow card) 3× (suspension)	Report	1× (yellow card) 4× (suspension)	Arena Skövde, Skövde; Attendance: 1,400; Referees: Hansson, Olsson (SWE)

26 January 2002; 19:00	Switzerland	22–24	Spain	Arena Skövde, Skövde; Attendance: 1,300; Referees: Boye, Jensen (DEN)
26 January 2002; 19:00	Kostadinovich 7	(10–14)	O'Callaghan, Ortega 5	Arena Skövde, Skövde; Attendance: 1,300; Referees: Boye, Jensen (DEN)
26 January 2002; 19:00	3× (yellow card) 4× (suspension) 1× (red card)	Report	3× (yellow card) 4× (suspension)	Arena Skövde, Skövde; Attendance: 1,300; Referees: Boye, Jensen (DEN)

27 January 2002; 17:00	Iceland	33–22	Switzerland	Arena Skövde, Skövde; Attendance: 2,020; Referees: Vakula, Liudovyk (UKR)
27 January 2002; 17:00	Stefánsson 11	(15–9)	Kostadinovich 8	Arena Skövde, Skövde; Attendance: 2,020; Referees: Vakula, Liudovyk (UKR)
27 January 2002; 17:00	2× (yellow card) 3× (suspension)	Report	3× (yellow card) 4× (suspension)	Arena Skövde, Skövde; Attendance: 2,020; Referees: Vakula, Liudovyk (UKR)

27 January 2002; 19:00	Spain	25–20	Slovenia	Arena Skövde, Skövde; Attendance: 2,190; Referees: Øie, Høgsnes (NOR)
27 January 2002; 19:00	Guijosa 9	(11–7)	Tomšič, Vugrinec 5	Arena Skövde, Skövde; Attendance: 2,190; Referees: Øie, Høgsnes (NOR)
27 January 2002; 19:00	3× (yellow card) 4× (suspension)	Report	2× (yellow card) 2× (suspension) 1× (red card)	Arena Skövde, Skövde; Attendance: 2,190; Referees: Øie, Høgsnes (NOR)

=== Group D ===
Pos	Team	Pld	W	D	L	GF	GA	GD	Pts	Qualification
1	Germany	3	2	1	0	68	57	+11	5 (Note: France 15–15 Germany)	Main round
2	France	3	2	1	0	66	62	+4	5	Main round
3	Yugoslavia	3	1	0	2	75	71	+4	2	Main round
4	Croatia	3	0	0	3	70	89	−19	0	

Source: EHF
Rules for classification: 1) points; 2) head-to-head points; 3) head-to-head goal difference; 4) head-to-head number of goals scored; 5) goal difference.
Notes:

25 January 2002; 18:00	Croatia	22–34	Yugoslavia	Kinnarps Arena, Jönköping; Attendance: 6,000; Referees: Øie, Høgsnes (NOR)
25 January 2002; 18:00	Goluža 5	(10–17)	Jovanović 8	Kinnarps Arena, Jönköping; Attendance: 6,000; Referees: Øie, Høgsnes (NOR)
25 January 2002; 18:00	2× (yellow card) 4× (suspension)	Report	2× (yellow card) 5× (suspension)	Kinnarps Arena, Jönköping; Attendance: 6,000; Referees: Øie, Høgsnes (NOR)

25 January 2002; 20:00	France	15–15	Germany	Kinnarps Arena, Jönköping; Attendance: 6,000; Referees: Hansson, Olsson (SWE)
25 January 2002; 20:00	Fernandez, B. Gille 4	(8–8)	Baur, Kehrmann 4	Kinnarps Arena, Jönköping; Attendance: 6,000; Referees: Hansson, Olsson (SWE)
25 January 2002; 20:00	3× (yellow card) 3× (suspension)	Report	2× (yellow card) 2× (suspension)	Kinnarps Arena, Jönköping; Attendance: 6,000; Referees: Hansson, Olsson (SWE)

26 January 2002; 17:30	Yugoslavia	20–22	France	Kinnarps Arena, Jönköping; Attendance: 6,000; Referees: Vakula, Liudovyk (UKR)
26 January 2002; 17:30	Jovanović 8	(9–14)	three players 4	Kinnarps Arena, Jönköping; Attendance: 6,000; Referees: Vakula, Liudovyk (UKR)
26 January 2002; 17:30	3× (yellow card) 5× (suspension)	Report	2× (yellow card) 7× (suspension)	Kinnarps Arena, Jönköping; Attendance: 6,000; Referees: Vakula, Liudovyk (UKR)

26 January 2002; 19:30	Germany	26–21	Croatia	Kinnarps Arena, Jönköping; Referees: Goulão, Macau (POR)
26 January 2002; 19:30	Kretzschmar 7	(13–9)	Goluža 9	Kinnarps Arena, Jönköping; Referees: Goulão, Macau (POR)
26 January 2002; 19:30	2× (yellow card) 5× (suspension)	Report	2× (yellow card) 4× (suspension)	Kinnarps Arena, Jönköping; Referees: Goulão, Macau (POR)

27 January 2002; 16:00	Germany	27–21	Yugoslavia	Kinnarps Arena, Jönköping; Referees: Boye, Jensen (DEN)
27 January 2002; 16:00	Kehrmann, Kretzschmar 8	(14–11)	Jovanović 7	Kinnarps Arena, Jönköping; Referees: Boye, Jensen (DEN)
27 January 2002; 16:00	3× (yellow card) 4× (suspension)	Report	3× (yellow card) 10× (suspension) 1× (red card)	Kinnarps Arena, Jönköping; Referees: Boye, Jensen (DEN)

27 January 2002; 18:00	France	29–27	Croatia	Kinnarps Arena, Jönköping; Referees: Migas, Bavas (GRE)
27 January 2002; 18:00	Plantin 8	(10–12)	Bilić 10	Kinnarps Arena, Jönköping; Referees: Migas, Bavas (GRE)
27 January 2002; 18:00	3× (yellow card) 6× (suspension)	Report	3× (yellow card) 5× (suspension)	Kinnarps Arena, Jönköping; Referees: Migas, Bavas (GRE)

== Main round ==
Points gained in the preliminary round against teams that also qualified, were carried over.

=== Group I ===
Pos	Team	Pld	W	D	L	GF	GA	GD	Pts	Qualification
1	Denmark	5	4	1	0	131	113	+18	9	Semifinals
2	Sweden (H)	5	4	0	1	141	118	+23	8	Semifinals
3	Russia	5	3	1	1	139	118	+21	7	Fifth place game
4	Czech Republic	5	2	0	3	126	145	−19	4	Seventh place game
5	Portugal	5	1	0	4	116	134	−18	2	Ninth place game
6	Ukraine	5	0	0	5	112	137	−25	0	Eleventh place game

Source: EHF
Rules for classification: 1) points; 2) head-to-head points; 3) head-to-head goal difference; 4) head-to-head number of goals scored; 5) goal difference.
(H) Hosts

29 January 2002; 16:00	Ukraine	23–28	Portugal	Scandinavium, Gothenburg; Attendance: 3,200; Referees: Migas, Bavas (GRE)
29 January 2002; 16:00	Kostetsky 7	(11–14)	R. Costa 7	Scandinavium, Gothenburg; Attendance: 3,200; Referees: Migas, Bavas (GRE)
29 January 2002; 16:00	3× (yellow card) 7× (suspension)	Report	3× (yellow card) 6× (suspension)	Scandinavium, Gothenburg; Attendance: 3,200; Referees: Migas, Bavas (GRE)

29 January 2002; 18:00	Czech Republic	25–31	Denmark	Scandinavium, Gothenburg; Attendance: 9,200; Referees: Nachevski, Nachevski (MKD)
29 January 2002; 18:00	Heinz 8	(10–18)	Christiansen 13	Scandinavium, Gothenburg; Attendance: 9,200; Referees: Nachevski, Nachevski (MKD)
29 January 2002; 18:00	3× (yellow card) 5× (suspension)	Report	3× (yellow card) 7× (suspension) 1× (red card)	Scandinavium, Gothenburg; Attendance: 9,200; Referees: Nachevski, Nachevski (MKD)

29 January 2002; 20:00	Sweden	30–26	Russia	Scandinavium, Gothenburg; Attendance: 11,400; Referees: Lemme, Ullrich (GER)
29 January 2002; 20:00	Lövgren 12	(18–14)	Rastvortsev 7	Scandinavium, Gothenburg; Attendance: 11,400; Referees: Lemme, Ullrich (GER)
29 January 2002; 20:00	3× (yellow card) 6× (suspension)	Report	3× (yellow card) 4× (suspension)	Scandinavium, Gothenburg; Attendance: 11,400; Referees: Lemme, Ullrich (GER)

30 January 2002; 16:00	Czech Republic	20–29	Russia	Scandinavium, Gothenburg; Attendance: 3,250; Referees: Øie, Høgsnes (NOR)
30 January 2002; 16:00	Filip 9	(8–12)	Voronin 7	Scandinavium, Gothenburg; Attendance: 3,250; Referees: Øie, Høgsnes (NOR)
30 January 2002; 16:00	3× (yellow card) 5× (suspension)	Report	3× (yellow card) 5× (suspension)	Scandinavium, Gothenburg; Attendance: 3,250; Referees: Øie, Høgsnes (NOR)

30 January 2002; 18:00	Ukraine	17–21	Denmark	Scandinavium, Gothenburg; Referees: Breto, Huelin (ESP)
30 January 2002; 18:00	Petrenko 6	(7–11)	Jeppesen 6	Scandinavium, Gothenburg; Referees: Breto, Huelin (ESP)
30 January 2002; 18:00	3× (yellow card) 3× (suspension)	Report	3× (yellow card) 3× (suspension)	Scandinavium, Gothenburg; Referees: Breto, Huelin (ESP)

30 January 2002; 20:00	Sweden	27–22	Portugal	Scandinavium, Gothenburg; Attendance: 10,650; Referees: Josić, Rudić (CRO)
30 January 2002; 20:00	Petersson 8	(15–12)	three players 4	Scandinavium, Gothenburg; Attendance: 10,650; Referees: Josić, Rudić (CRO)
30 January 2002; 20:00	3× (yellow card) 6× (suspension) 1× (red card)	Report	2× (yellow card) 3× (suspension)	Scandinavium, Gothenburg; Attendance: 10,650; Referees: Josić, Rudić (CRO)

31 January 2002; 16:00	Czech Republic	29–27	Portugal	Scandinavium, Gothenburg; Attendance: 3,750; Referees: Lemme, Ullrich (GER)
31 January 2002; 16:00	three players 6	(14–14)	R. Costa 9	Scandinavium, Gothenburg; Attendance: 3,750; Referees: Lemme, Ullrich (GER)
31 January 2002; 16:00	3× (yellow card) 4× (suspension)	Report	3× (yellow card) 6× (suspension)	Scandinavium, Gothenburg; Attendance: 3,750; Referees: Lemme, Ullrich (GER)

31 January 2002; 18:00	Ukraine	24–31	Russia	Scandinavium, Gothenburg; Referees: Josić, Rudić (CRO)
31 January 2002; 18:00	Kostetsky 6	(10–12)	Tuchkin 6	Scandinavium, Gothenburg; Referees: Josić, Rudić (CRO)
31 January 2002; 18:00	3× (yellow card) 6× (suspension)	Report	2× (yellow card) 4× (suspension)	Scandinavium, Gothenburg; Referees: Josić, Rudić (CRO)

31 January 2002; 20:00	Sweden	26–27	Denmark	Scandinavium, Gothenburg; Attendance: 11,700; Referees: Øie, Høgsnes (NOR)
31 January 2002; 20:00	Andersson, Lövgren 7	(14–11)	Boldsen, Stryger 5	Scandinavium, Gothenburg; Attendance: 11,700; Referees: Øie, Høgsnes (NOR)
31 January 2002; 20:00	1× (yellow card) 5× (suspension)	Report	3× (yellow card) 4× (suspension)	Scandinavium, Gothenburg; Attendance: 11,700; Referees: Øie, Høgsnes (NOR)

=== Group II ===
Pos	Team	Pld	W	D	L	GF	GA	GD	Pts	Qualification
1	Iceland	5	3	2	0	144	125	+19	8	Semifinals
2	Germany	5	3	1	1	116	111	+5	7	Semifinals
3	France	5	2	2	1	123	109	+14	6	Fifth place game
4	Spain	5	2	1	2	126	122	+4	5	Seventh place game
5	Yugoslavia	5	1	1	3	126	139	−13	3	Ninth place game
6	Slovenia	5	0	1	4	118	147	−29	1	Eleventh place game

Source: EHF
Rules for classification: 1) points; 2) head-to-head points; 3) head-to-head goal difference; 4) head-to-head number of goals scored; 5) goal difference.

29 January 2002; 16:00	Iceland	26–26	France	Västeråshallen, Västerås; Attendance: 2,800; Referees: Falcone, Rätz (SUI)
29 January 2002; 16:00	Jóhannesson 6	(14–12)	Burdet 7	Västeråshallen, Västerås; Attendance: 2,800; Referees: Falcone, Rätz (SUI)
29 January 2002; 16:00	3× (yellow card) 7× (suspension)	Report	3× (yellow card) 8× (suspension)	Västeråshallen, Västerås; Attendance: 2,800; Referees: Falcone, Rätz (SUI)

29 January 2002; 18:00	Slovenia	24–24	Yugoslavia	Västeråshallen, Västerås; Referees: Klucsó, Lekrinszki (HUN)
29 January 2002; 18:00	Pungartnik 9	(11–14)	Matić 9	Västeråshallen, Västerås; Referees: Klucsó, Lekrinszki (HUN)
29 January 2002; 18:00	3× (yellow card) 2× (suspension)	Report	3× (yellow card) 5× (suspension) 1× (red card)	Västeråshallen, Västerås; Referees: Klucsó, Lekrinszki (HUN)

29 January 2002; 20:00	Spain	18–19	Germany	Västeråshallen, Västerås; Referees: Vakula, Liudovyk (UKR)
29 January 2002; 20:00	Ortega 6	(9–8)	Stephan 6	Västeråshallen, Västerås; Referees: Vakula, Liudovyk (UKR)
29 January 2002; 20:00	3× (yellow card) 4× (suspension) 1× (red card)	Report	3× (yellow card) 6× (suspension)	Västeråshallen, Västerås; Referees: Vakula, Liudovyk (UKR)

30 January 2002; 16:00	Iceland	34–26	Yugoslavia	Västeråshallen, Västerås; Attendance: 3,480; Referees: Goulão, Macau (POR)
30 January 2002; 16:00	Stefánsson 10	(16–14)	Škrbić 6	Västeråshallen, Västerås; Attendance: 3,480; Referees: Goulão, Macau (POR)
30 January 2002; 16:00	3× (yellow card) 2× (suspension)	Report	2× (yellow card) 5× (suspension)	Västeråshallen, Västerås; Attendance: 3,480; Referees: Goulão, Macau (POR)

30 January 2002; 18:00	Slovenia	28–31	Germany	Västeråshallen, Västerås; Attendance: 3,660; Referees: Hansson, Olsson (SWE)
30 January 2002; 18:00	Pajovič 6	(12–12)	Hens 6	Västeråshallen, Västerås; Attendance: 3,660; Referees: Hansson, Olsson (SWE)
30 January 2002; 18:00	3× (yellow card) 2× (suspension)	Report	3× (yellow card) 4× (suspension)	Västeråshallen, Västerås; Attendance: 3,660; Referees: Hansson, Olsson (SWE)

30 January 2002; 20:00	Spain	27–24	France	Västeråshallen, Västerås; Attendance: 3,870; Referees: Boye, Jensen (DEN)
30 January 2002; 20:00	Urdiales 5	(13–11)	Girault 7	Västeråshallen, Västerås; Attendance: 3,870; Referees: Boye, Jensen (DEN)
30 January 2002; 20:00	3× (yellow card) 8× (suspension)	Report	3× (yellow card) 9× (suspension) 1× (red card)	Västeråshallen, Västerås; Attendance: 3,870; Referees: Boye, Jensen (DEN)

31 January 2002; 16:00	Spain	32–35	Yugoslavia	Västeråshallen, Västerås; Attendance: 2,300; Referees: Hansson, Olsson (SWE)
31 January 2002; 16:00	Entrerríos 10	(15–15)	Lisičić, Škrbić 8	Västeråshallen, Västerås; Attendance: 2,300; Referees: Hansson, Olsson (SWE)
31 January 2002; 16:00	2× (yellow card) 4× (suspension)	Report	2× (yellow card) 5× (suspension)	Västeråshallen, Västerås; Attendance: 2,300; Referees: Hansson, Olsson (SWE)

31 January 2002; 18:00	Slovenia	21–36	France	Västeråshallen, Västerås; Attendance: 3,300; Referees: Goulão, Macau (POR)
31 January 2002; 18:00	Pungartnik 5	(10–19)	Fernandez 12	Västeråshallen, Västerås; Attendance: 3,300; Referees: Goulão, Macau (POR)
31 January 2002; 18:00	3× (yellow card) 6× (suspension) 1× (red card)	Report	3× (yellow card) 4× (suspension)	Västeråshallen, Västerås; Attendance: 3,300; Referees: Goulão, Macau (POR)

31 January 2002; 20:00	Iceland	29–24	Germany	Västeråshallen, Västerås; Attendance: 3,900; Referees: Klucsó, Lekrinszki (HUN)
31 January 2002; 20:00	Jóhannesson 8	(15–11)	Hens 5	Västeråshallen, Västerås; Attendance: 3,900; Referees: Klucsó, Lekrinszki (HUN)
31 January 2002; 20:00	3× (yellow card) 6× (suspension)	Report	3× (yellow card) 7× (suspension)	Västeråshallen, Västerås; Attendance: 3,900; Referees: Klucsó, Lekrinszki (HUN)

== Placement games ==
=== Eleventh place game ===
2 February 2002; 09:30	Ukraine	34–29	Slovenia	Globen Arena, Stockholm; Attendance: 2,000; Referees: Lemme, Ullrich (GER)
2 February 2002; 09:30	Kostetskiy 11	(20–14)	Vugrinec 7	Globen Arena, Stockholm; Attendance: 2,000; Referees: Lemme, Ullrich (GER)
2 February 2002; 09:30	3× (yellow card) 5× (suspension)	Report	3× (yellow card) 5× (suspension) 1× (red card)	Globen Arena, Stockholm; Attendance: 2,000; Referees: Lemme, Ullrich (GER)

=== Ninth place game ===
3 February 2002; 12:00	Portugal	31–25	Yugoslavia	Globen Arena, Stockholm; Attendance: 1,000; Referees: Boye, Jensen (DEN)
3 February 2002; 12:00	Andorinho 9	(15–12)	Jovanović 8	Globen Arena, Stockholm; Attendance: 1,000; Referees: Boye, Jensen (DEN)
3 February 2002; 12:00	3× (yellow card) 4× (suspension)	Report	3× (yellow card) 1× (suspension)	Globen Arena, Stockholm; Attendance: 1,000; Referees: Boye, Jensen (DEN)

=== Seventh place game ===
2 February 2002; 09:30	Czech Republic	29–36	Spain	Globen Arena, Stockholm; Attendance: 4,150; Referees: Klucsó, Lekrinszki (HUN)
2 February 2002; 09:30	Filip 10	(14–17)	Hernández 8	Globen Arena, Stockholm; Attendance: 4,150; Referees: Klucsó, Lekrinszki (HUN)
2 February 2002; 09:30	2× (yellow card) 4× (suspension)	Report	3× (yellow card) 7× (suspension)	Globen Arena, Stockholm; Attendance: 4,150; Referees: Klucsó, Lekrinszki (HUN)

=== Fifth place game ===
3 February 2002; 12:00	Russia	31–28	France	Globen Arena, Stockholm; Attendance: 3,050; Referees: Øie, Høgsnes (NOR)
3 February 2002; 12:00	Krivoshlykov 10	(14–11)	B. Gille 5	Globen Arena, Stockholm; Attendance: 3,050; Referees: Øie, Høgsnes (NOR)
3 February 2002; 12:00	3× (yellow card) 3× (suspension)	Report	2× (yellow card) 2× (suspension)	Globen Arena, Stockholm; Attendance: 3,050; Referees: Øie, Høgsnes (NOR)

== Final round ==
=== Bracket ===
Semi-finals
2. February 2002
Denmark	23
Germany	28
2. February 2002
Sweden	33
Iceland	22

Final
3. February 2002
Germany	31
Sweden (ET)	33
Bronze-final
3. February 2002
Denmark	29
Iceland	22

=== Semifinals ===
2 February 2002; 16:00	Sweden	33–22	Iceland	Globen Arena, Stockholm; Attendance: 14,000; Referees: Goulão, Macau (POR)
2 February 2002; 16:00	Lövgren, Petersson 6	(14–12)	Stefánsson 6	Globen Arena, Stockholm; Attendance: 14,000; Referees: Goulão, Macau (POR)
2 February 2002; 16:00	2× (yellow card) 2× (suspension)	Report	3× (yellow card)	Globen Arena, Stockholm; Attendance: 14,000; Referees: Goulão, Macau (POR)

2 February 2002; 18:30	Denmark	23–28	Germany	Globen Arena, Stockholm; Attendance: 13,550; Referees: Josić, Rudić (CRO)
2 February 2002; 18:30	Stryger 6	(12–13)	Baur, Zerbe 7	Globen Arena, Stockholm; Attendance: 13,550; Referees: Josić, Rudić (CRO)
2 February 2002; 18:30	2× (yellow card) 8× (suspension)	Report	3× (yellow card) 5× (suspension)	Globen Arena, Stockholm; Attendance: 13,550; Referees: Josić, Rudić (CRO)

=== Third place game ===
3 February 2002; 15:30	Denmark	29–22	Iceland	Globen Arena, Stockholm; Attendance: 12,380; Referees: Vakula, Liudovyk (UKR)
3 February 2002; 15:30	Jeppesen 8	(13–11)	S. Sigurðsson 6	Globen Arena, Stockholm; Attendance: 12,380; Referees: Vakula, Liudovyk (UKR)
3 February 2002; 15:30	3× (yellow card) 5× (suspension) 1× (red card)	Report	3× (yellow card) 6× (suspension) 1× (red card)	Globen Arena, Stockholm; Attendance: 12,380; Referees: Vakula, Liudovyk (UKR)

=== Final ===
3 February 2002
18:00
Germany
31–33 (ET)
Sweden
Globen Arena, Stockholm
Attendance: 14,300
Referees: Nachevski, Nachevski (MKD)
three players 6
(14–13)
Lövgren 8
3× (yellow card) 7× (suspension)
Report
3× (yellow card) 9× (suspension)

FT: 26–26 ET: 5–7

== Ranking and statistics ==
=== Final ranking ===
Gold medal	Sweden
Silver medal	Germany
Bronze medal	Denmark
4.	Iceland
5.	Russia
6.	France
7.	Spain
8.	Czech Republic
9.	Portugal
10.	Yugoslavia
11.	Ukraine
12.	Slovenia
13.	Switzerland
14.	Israel
15.	Poland
16.	Croatia

2002 Men's European Champions

Sweden
Fourth Title

=== All-Star Team ===
Position	Player
Goalkeeper	Peter Gentzel (SWE)
Right wing	Denis Krivoshlykov (RUS)
Right back	Ólafur Stefánsson (ISL)
Centre back	Daniel Stephan (GER)
Left back	Stefan Lövgren (SWE)
Left wing	Lars Christiansen (DEN)
Pivot	Magnus Wislander (SWE)
Most valuable player	Magnus Wislander (SWE)

Source: EHF Archived 9 August 2020 at the Wayback Machine

=== Top goalscorers ===
Rank	Name	Team	Goals	Shots	%
1	Ólafur Stefánsson	Iceland	58	107	54
2	Stefan Lövgren	Sweden	57	90	63
3	Yuriy Kostetskiy	Ukraine	52	92	57
4	Nedeljko Jovanović	Yugoslavia	46	74	62
5	Jan Filip	Czech Republic	44	65	68
6	Lars Christiansen	Denmark	43	58	74
7	Johan Petersson	Sweden	36	50	72
8	Patrekur Jóhannesson	Iceland	35	66	53
8	Renato Vugrinec	Slovenia	35	79	44
10	Daniel Stephan	Germany	33	74	45

Source: EHF

=== Top goalkeepers ===
(minimum 20% of total shots received by team)

Rank	Name	Team	%	Saves	Shots
1	Sergiy Bilyk	Ukraine	42	48	115
2	Peter Gentzel	Sweden	41	70	171
2	Dejan Perić	Yugoslavia	41	90	220
4	Miloš Slabý	Czech Republic	40	42	105
4	Michael Bruun	Denmark	40	42	105
4	Arpad Sterbik	Yugoslavia	40	37	93
7	José Javier Hombrados	Spain	39	40	102
8	Yevgeny Budko	Ukraine	36	56	155
8	Sérgio Morgado	Portugal	36	49	136
8	Rafał Bernacki	Poland	36	14	39
8	David Barrufet	Spain	36	62	173

Source: EHF EHF
