= Idrottens Hus =

Idrottens Hus (Swedish: "The House of Sport") may refer to

- Idrottens Hus (Helsingborg), an arena in Helsingborg, Sweden
- Idrottens Hus (Stockholm), an office building in Stockholm, home of Swedish Sports Confederation and many other Swedish sports governing federations
