= Lars Christiansen (handballer) =

Danish handball player (born 1972)

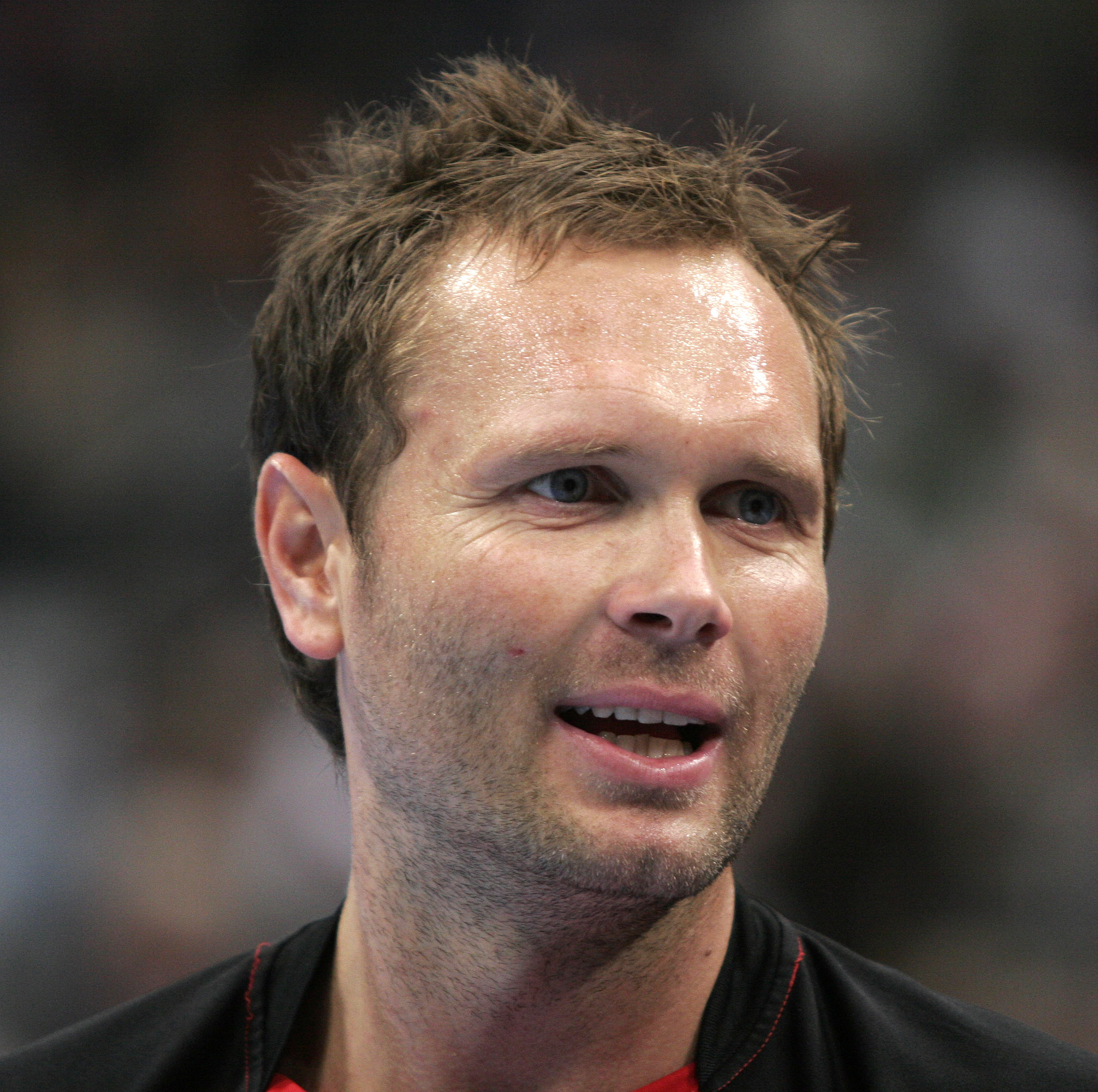
- Christiansen in 2007

Personal information
- Full name: Lars Roslyng Christiansen
- Nationality: Danish
- Born: 18 April 1972 (age 54) Sønderborg, Denmark
- Height: 1.82 m (6 ft 0 in)

Sport
- Sport: Handball
- Position: Left wing
- Current club: KIF Kolding (sport director)

Youth career
- Years: Team
- 1976-1990: Vidar Sønderborg

Senior clubs
- Years: Team
- 1990-1992: Ribe HK
- 1992-1996: KIF Kolding
- 1996-2010: SG Flensburg-Handewitt
- 2010-2012: KIF Kolding
National team
Years	Team	Apps	(Gls)
1992-2012	Denmark	338	(1503)

Teams managed
- 2019–2023: SG Flensburg-Handewitt (sport director)
- 2023–: KIF Kolding (sport director)
Medal record
Men's Handball
Representing Denmark
World Championship
Silver medal – second place	2011 Sweden	Team
Bronze medal – third place	2007 Germany	Team
European Championship
Gold medal – first place	2008 Norway	Team
Gold medal – first place	2012 Serbia	Team
Bronze medal – third place	2002 Sweden	Team
Bronze medal – third place	2004 Slovenia	Team
Bronze medal – third place	2006 Switzerland	Team
- Updated on 20 July 2023

Lars Roslyng Christiansen (born 18 April 1972) is a Danish former team handball player. He is European Champion, winning the 2008 European Men's Handball Championship and 2012 European Men's Handball Championship with the Denmark national team. He was top scorer at the 2008 championship together with Nikola Karabatic and Ivano Balić, and was also voted into the 2008 All-star team.

Christiansen has played 338 games for the Denmark national team, and scored 1503 goals. He is currently the player with most games and most goals for the Denmark national team.

He played for the German club SG Flensburg-Handewitt, and was part of the team when the club won the German championship in 2004, and won the EHF Cup in 1997. In his 14 years with SG Flensburg-Handewitt he scored 3996 times, 1623 of these was scored from the 7 meter penalty spot.

Lars Christiansen's cousin Jan Paulsen has played together with Lars Christiansen for the Denmark national bed - as playmaker.

He has been married to former handballer, Christina Roslyng, who played at the Danish national handball team. Together, they have two sons, Frederik and August. They split up in 2009, however, as of 2012, they are back together.

In 2018, he participated in the Danish version of Dancing with the Stars, Vild med dans, with the partner Sofie Kruuse.

== Trophies ==
=== Club Team ===
- EHF Champions League:
  - Silver: 2004, 2007
- German Championship:
  - Gold: 2004
- DHB-Pokal:
  - Gold: 2003, 2004, 2005
- EHF Cup:
  - Gold: 1997
- EHF Cup Winner's Cup:
  - Gold: 2001
- EHF City Cup:
  - Gold: 1999
- Danish Championship:
  - Gold: 1993, 1994

=== National team ===
- IHF World Championship:
  - Silver: 2011
  - Bronze: 2007
- EHF European Championship:
  - Gold: 2008, 2012
  - Bronze: 2002, 2004, 2006

=== Personal awards ===
- German Bundesliga Topscorer: 2005, 2003

== Individual awards ==
- All-Star Left wing of the European Championship: 2008
- Top Scorer of the European Championship: 2008
- Top Scorer of the Handball-Bundesliga: 2003, 2005

== See also ==
- List of men's handballers with 1000 or more international goals
