= European Men's Handball Championship =

Competition for senior national teams

- Current season, competition or edition: 2028 European Men's Handball Championship
- Sport: Handball
- Founded: 1994; 32 years ago
- No. of teams: 24 (finals)
- Continent: Europe (EHF)
- Most recent champion: Denmark (3rd title)
- Most titles: Sweden (5 titles)

The European Men's Handball Championship is the official competition for senior men's national handball teams of Europe and takes place every two years since 1994, in the even-numbered year between the World Championship. In addition to crowning the European champions, the tournament also serves as a qualifying tournament for the Olympic Games and World Championship. The most successful team is Sweden who have won five titles. Spain and Denmark, however, have won most medals.

== History ==
In 1946, the International Handball Federation was founded by eight European nations, and though non-European nations competed at the World Championships, the medals had always been taken by European nations. European Handball Federation is founded in 1991. At the same time (1995), the World Championship was changed from a quadrennial to a biannual event, and the European Handball Federation now began its own championship – which also acted as a regional qualifier for the World Championship.

=== 1990–2000: Sweden domination ===
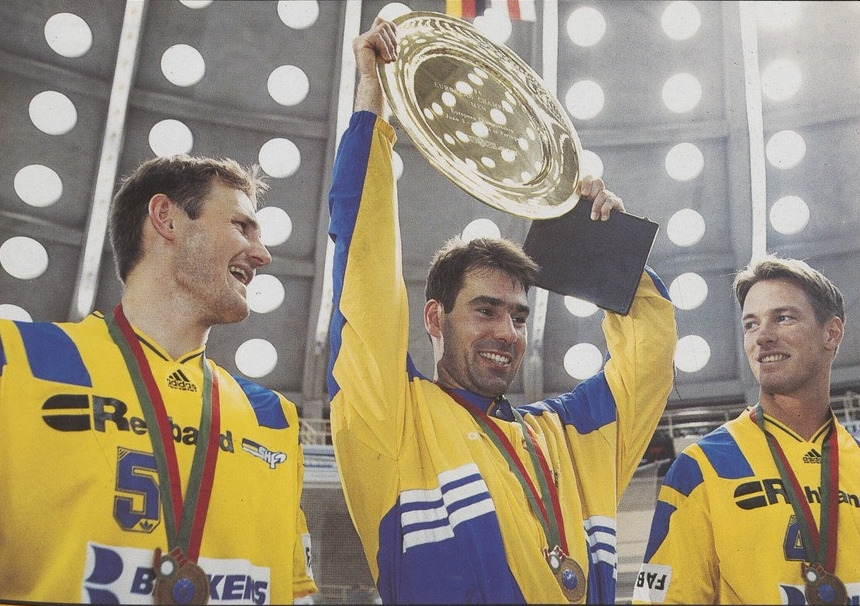
Sweden national team with the first title, 1994.

The first championship was held in Portugal in June 1994. The host nation had not managed to qualify for any World Championship thus far, and they finished 12th and last after losing all six games, including 21–38 to Romania in the 11th-place play-off. Sweden became the first European champion after defeating Russia by 34–21 in the final, Russia's heaviest loss in their international history. Both teams had gone through the tournament without loss, but Sweden's fast breaks became the key in the final; they scored 14 of their 34 goals on fast breaks. Swedish middle back Magnus Andersson was named the event's best player and Russian left back Vasily Kudinov was top scorer with 50 goals.

Two years later, the championship moved to Spain, with the same format. This time, no team went through the group stage without giving up points, but Russia and Sweden were to face off once again; this time in the semi-final, and Russia got revenge with a 24–21 win in front of 650 spectators. In the other semi-final, the hosts beat Yugoslavia 27–23, before 7,500 spectators littered the arena in Sevilla to watch the hosts go down by one goal despite the efforts of Talant Dujshebaev, a Kyrgyz-born back player who had played for Russia in 1994 but who now turned out for Spain. Federal Republic of Yugoslavia participated for the first time and finished third.

In 1998 the Championship was held in Italy, whose appearance at the 1997 World Championship was their first at the top level of international handball. Spain went through the first six matches of the tournament unbeaten, while their opponents Sweden had won the first four games before becoming the first team to lose to hosts Italy. However, in the final, Sweden were too strong and won by 25–23 after having led by 15–9 at half-time in front of 6,100 spectators in Bolzano.

=== 2000–2010: Shared dominance between France and Denmark ===
Two years later, the Championship was held in the Croatian cities of Zagreb and Rijeka. By now, the Championship had been moved back to January in the middle of the European handball season. The Championship acted as an Olympic qualifier, and hosts Croatia, who had won the 1996 Olympics, needed to finish in the top five to qualify. They lost to Spain and drew with France in the group stage, which sent them into a fifth-place play-off with neighbours Slovenia. 10,000 spectators watched as Slovenia prevailed by one goal and qualified for the Sydney Games. The two teams who had won European Championships before, Sweden and Russia, qualified for the final – Sweden had won the group stage match 28–25, but Russia took a six-goal lead at half-time. Sweden came back to tie the game at full-time, and two 10-minute extra periods were required before Sweden won 32–31 after Magnus Wislander scored the deciding goal.

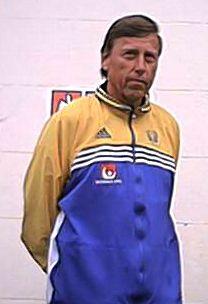
Bengt Johansson was the head coach of the Swedish national team from 1988 to 2002.

Three-time champions Sweden were the next to host the European Championship, in 2002. This was the first tournament with 16 teams, an expansion from 12 in the previous four instalments. The Swedes won their first seven matches, and had already qualified for the semi-finals when they lost 26–27 to Denmark, having led 17–11 at half time. In the other main round group, Iceland became the third Nordic team to qualify after defeating Germany in the final match, but both Denmark and Iceland were soundly beaten in the semi-finals – Denmark lost 23–28 to Germany, while Sweden defeated Iceland by 11 goals. Sweden thus qualified for their fourth final in five attempts, and in front of 14,300 spectators in Stockholm Globe, they came back from a one-goal deficit when Staffan Olsson equalised with five seconds to spare. Sweden had substituted their goalkeeper, and Florian Kehrmann replied with a goal in an empty net, but it was disallowed because the referees had not started play after the Swedish goal. In the extra time, Sweden held on, and could celebrate their fourth title.

Sweden's row of three successive Championships was broken in Slovenia in 2004, when Germany won despite not being touted as a medal candidate by news agency Deutsche Presse Agentur. Germany suffered an early defeat to Serbia and Montenegro, and qualified for the main round as the third and final team from their group, having drawn with France as well. However, as the favourites beat each other in Germany's main round group, Germany qualified for the semi-finals in first place from the six-team group. In the other group, Croatia, who won the other group, had not lost any of their first seven games, while Denmark also had four successive wins.

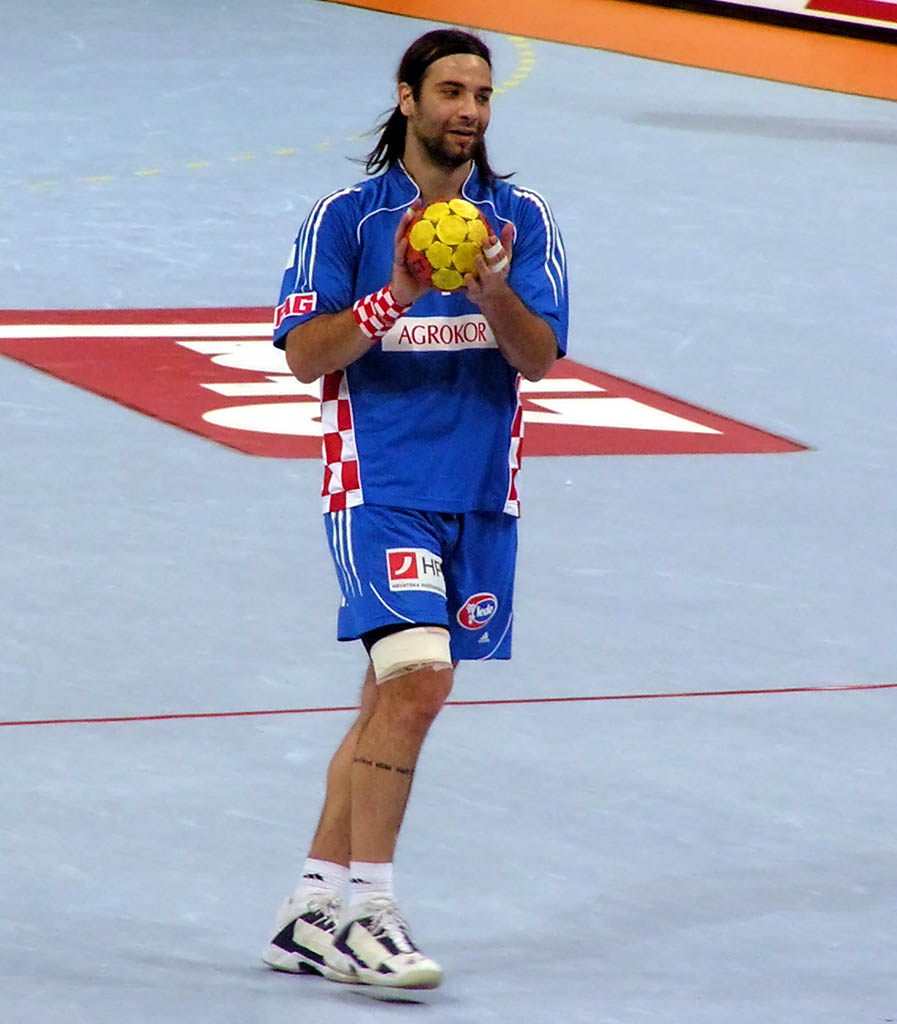
Ivano Balić a Croatian international, who won two silver medals and one bronze medal in European championship.

Croatia faced hosts Slovenia in the semi-final, and the clash of the two Balkan neighbours saw heightened security measures. 7,000 spectators in the Hall Tivoli saw that the hosts became the first team to beat Croatia in this tournament despite 12 goals from Croatian right winger Mirza Džomba who was reputed to be the best handball player in the world at the time. Denmark, who had reached their second successive semi-final, once again had to bow out at this stage, as they lost 20–22 to Germany in what was described as a "hard-fought victory." Germany won the final more convincingly; a 16–10 lead at half time was never squandered, as Slovenia only got within three goals in the second half, and eventually lost 25–30.

The 2006 tournament was held in Switzerland, in the cities of Basel, Bern, Lucerne, St Gallen and Zürich. France won the tournament, going through with one solitary loss – a 26–29 defeat to Spain in the preliminary round (where France trailed by eight goals at half-time). Defending champions Germany was also in this preliminary group, and this time taking one point through from the group stage would not be enough for Germany. Despite winning all three main round games, so did France and Spain, and those two teams qualified for the semi-finals from Group I. From the other group, Croatia qualified in first place after a 34–30 victory over Serbia and Montenegro in the last match. Later that evening, Denmark beat Russia and qualified for their third successive semi-final, one point behind Croatia. However, the Group II teams were both defeated by Group I teams, causing France and Spain to meet again in the final. In the third-place play-off, Croatia surprisingly lost to Denmark, while the final saw France prevail by eight goals to win their first European Championship

Norway was the host country for the 2008 tournament. Matches were played in Bergen, Drammen, Lillehammer, Stavanger and Trondheim. Croatia, Norway, Hungary and France won their preliminary groups, but two of the teams failed to utilise their advantage; Norway drew with Poland and lost to Slovenia, and needed to beat Croatia in the final match of the group stage. Instead, Ivano Balić scored the 23–22 goal with twenty seconds to spare, and only a late equaliser gave Norway third place in the group. Hungary, Spain and Germany had all gone through with two points from Group C, and Germany sealed their qualification with a two-goal win over Sweden in a match where a draw would have been enough for the Swedes. In the first semifinal Croatia played France in a game dominated by strong defense by both teams, with the Croats achieving a three-goal lead twice, only to see France come back strong. Croatia goalkeeper Mirko Alilović saved a shot from Nikola Karabatic with six seconds to go as Croatia won 24–23. Denmark came back from 7–12 down to beat Germany, despite the Germans equalising within the final minute, as Lars Christiansen slotted home a penalty shot with three seconds remaining. Croatia started off well in the final, scoring the first four goals, but with eight saves more from Denmark's keeper, Kasper Hvidt, Denmark won 24–20 and took their first major trophy.

=== 2010–2020: Spain, consistently among the top teams ===
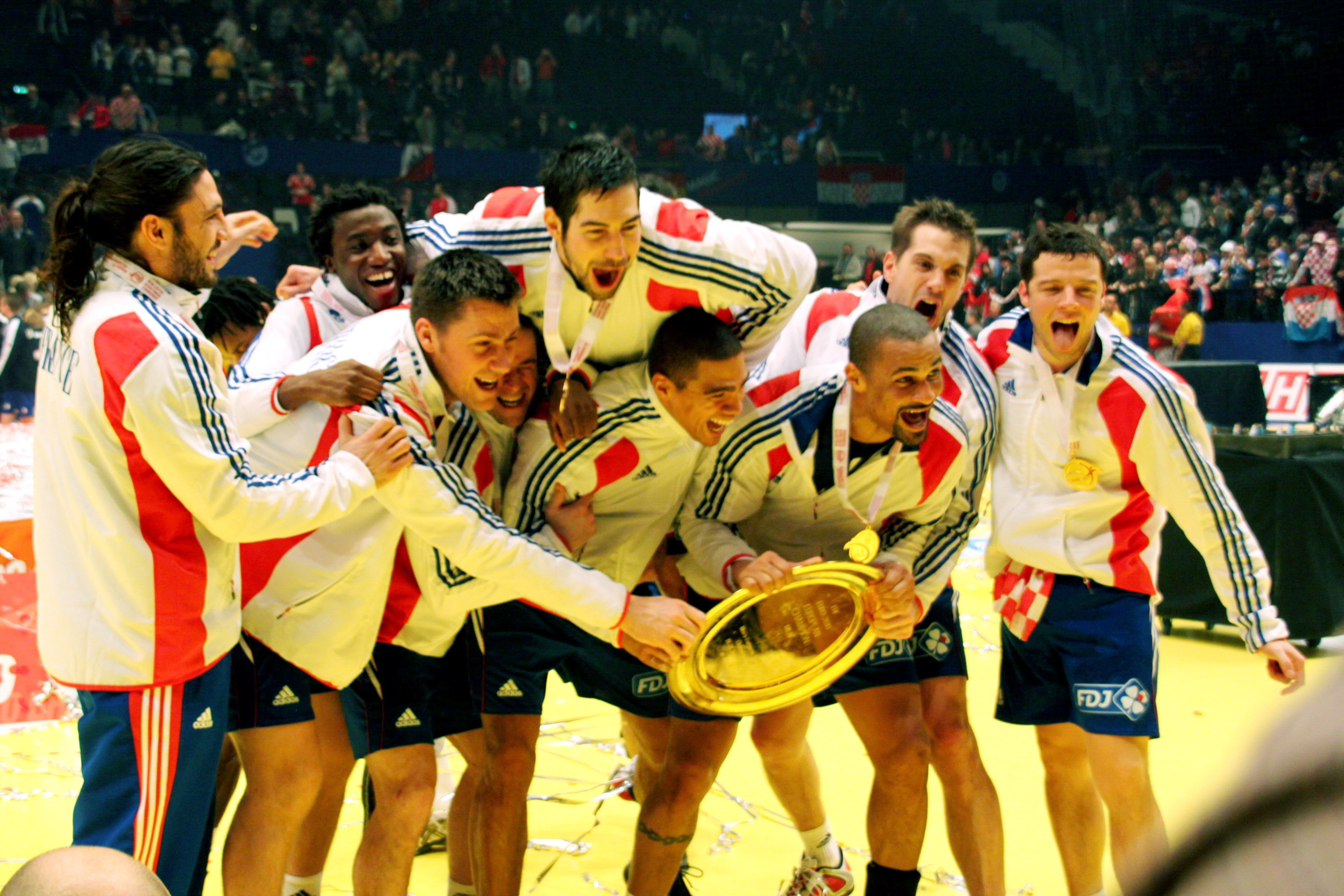
France celebrating second title in 2010.

The 2010 European Championship, held in Austria, ended with an unprecedented treble by France, who had previously won the 2008 Olympic Games and the 2009 World Championship. France experienced a difficult start to the tournament, recording two draws and a one-goal victory in the preliminary round. However, the team gradually improved and won all of its matches in the main round, finishing first in its group ahead of Poland. The other main round group, also closely contested, was won by Croatia, with Iceland finishing second. In the semi-finals, France defeated Iceland (36–28), while Croatia overcame Poland (24–21), a rematch of the 2009 World Championship. Croatia led 12–9 in the 27th minute of the final, but France produced an 8–1 run across half-time to secure a 25–21 victory and claim the title. In the third-place match, Iceland defeated Poland 29–26 to win the bronze medal. With this title, France held all three major gold medals – Olympic, World, and European.

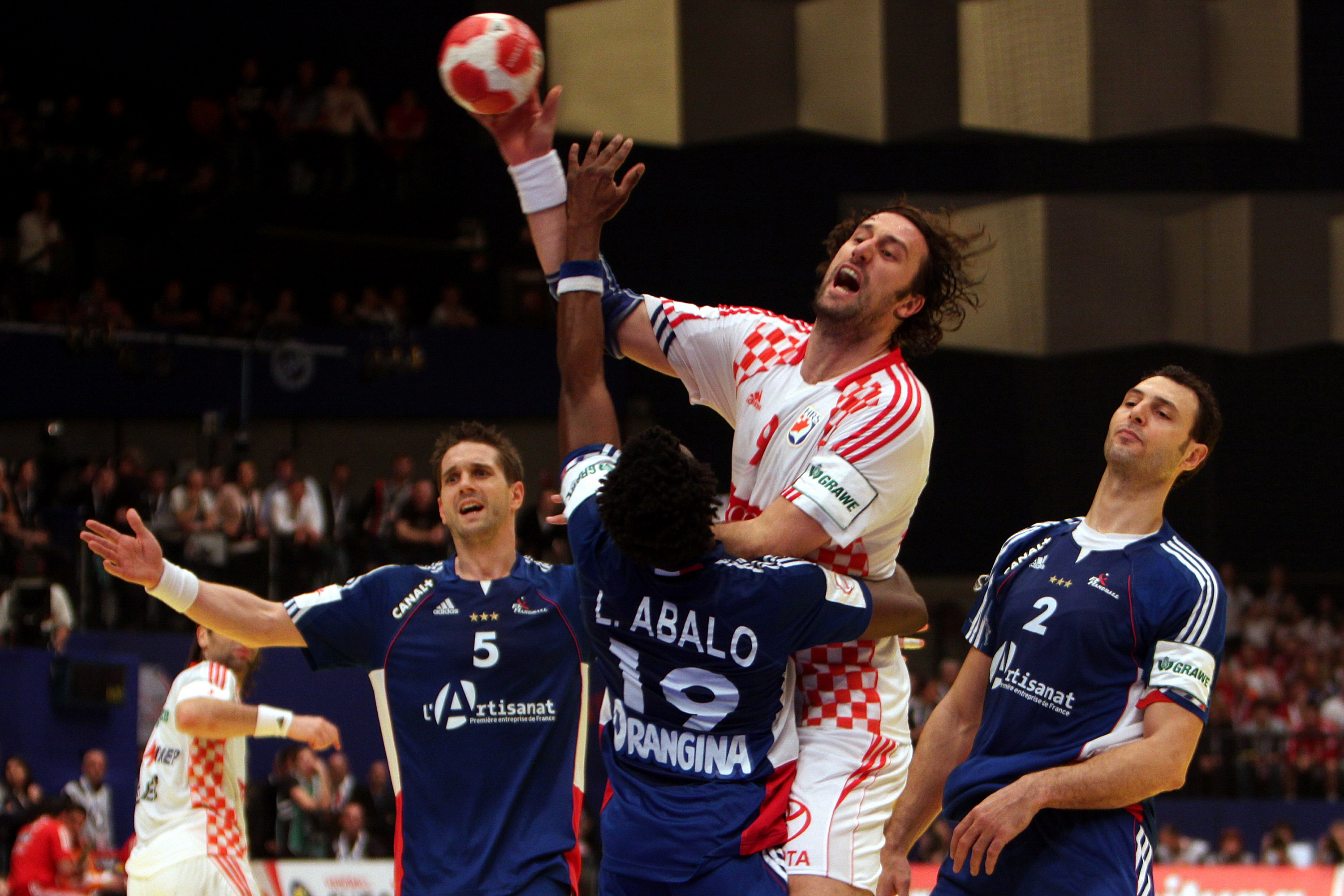
Ivano Balić attacking during the final of the 2010 European Championship between Croatia and France.

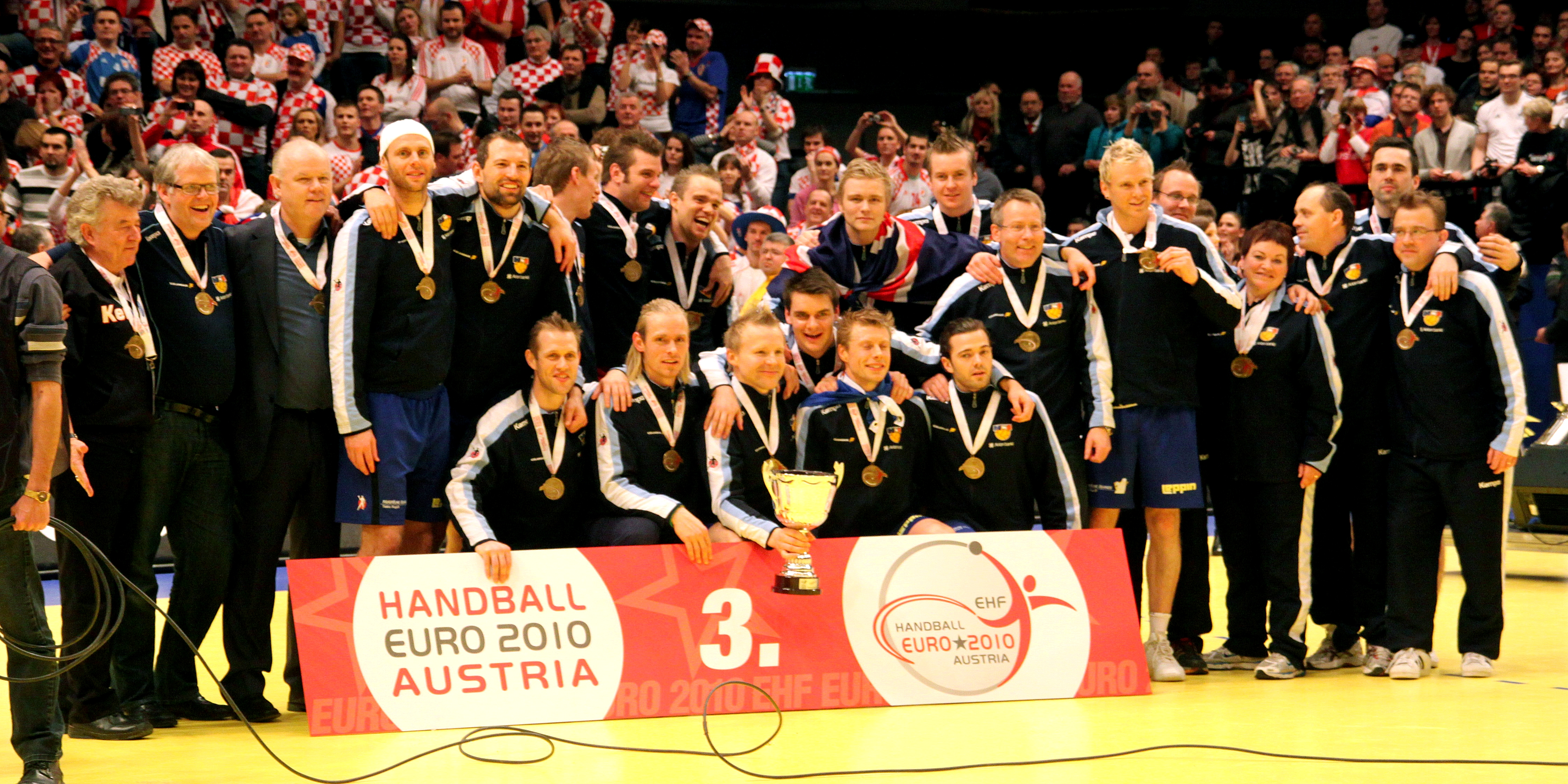
Iceland celebrating first European medal in 2010.

The 2012 European Championship was notable for the performances of Serbia and France. Serbia, benefiting from home advantage, reached the final, while France, the defending champions, finished in 11th place. After two weeks of top-class handball, Denmark topped the podium of a Men's EHF EURO event for the second time, beating hosts Serbia 21:19. Denmark's first success had come in 2008 when they won the EHF EURO in Norway. Croatia won bronze with 31:27 win against Spain in the match for third place. In total, more than 300,000 spectators had been at the 47 matches of the EHF EURO in Serbia – a new all-time record for European Championships, including each 20,000 fans in Belgrade on the final and semi-final day. Denmark won its second European Championship title after defeating Spain in the semi-finals (25–24) and Serbia in the final (21–19). Serbia had eliminated neighbouring Croatia in the semi-finals in a match played in a heated atmosphere that included a serious incident in which a Croatian player was injured by a projectile. Croatia later won the bronze medal by defeating Spain 31–27.

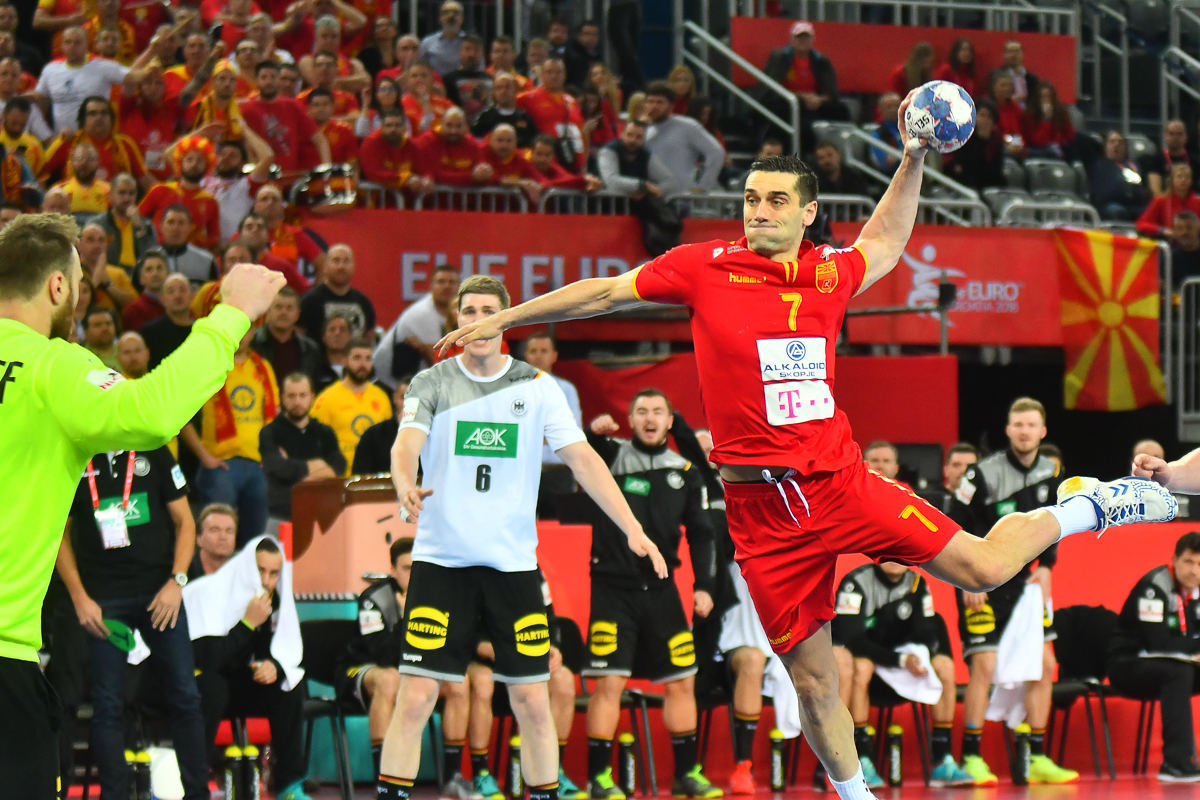
Kiril Lazarov at the 2018 European Championship

The 2014 European Championship, hosted by Denmark for the first time, was expected to confirm the Danes—winners of two of the previous three European Championships and two-time reigning World Championship runners-up—as the leading team in Europe. Denmark won all of its group-stage matches and narrowly defeated Croatia in the semi-finals (29–27). Despite being in a transitional phase, France topped its main round group and also edged Spain in the semi-finals (30–27). In the final, France defeated Denmark 41–32. Denmark trailed by ten goals as early as the 21st minute, and the margin never fell below six goals. With this victory, France won its third European Championship title and became the first team to score more than 40 goals in an international final. Spain secured the bronze medal after defeating Croatia 29–28. French player Nikola Karabatić was named Most Valuable Player of the tournament for the second time at a European Championship, while Joan Cañellas of Spain finished as the tournament's top scorer with 50 goals. The EHF EURO 2014 set a new attendance record, with 316,000 spectators flocking to the arenas in Herning, Aarhus, Aalborg and Brondby to follow the matches.

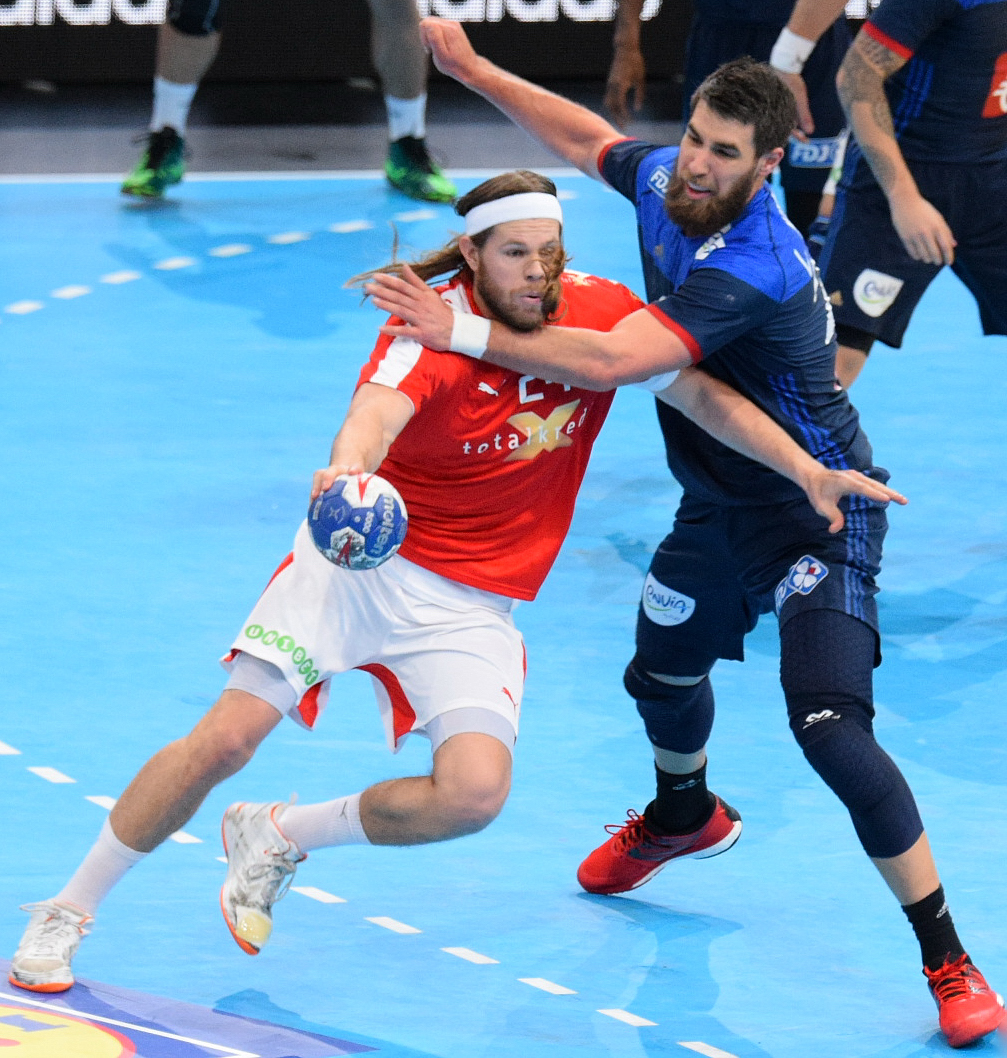
Mikkel Hansen (left) playing for Denmark against France and Luka Karabatić in 2016

Poland had the honour to organise an EHF EURO for the first time in 2016. Spread over four venues, the 12th edition of the Men's European Championship became an appealing event played in front of enthusiastic crowds. There was heartbreak for the hosts as Poland lost their decisive main round game against eventual bronze medallists Croatia and missed the semi-finals. Germany scraped through their semi-final against Norway, beating the Scandinavians only after extra time, but had a clear 24:17 win over Spain in the final to take the trophy back to Germany after 12 years.

Croatia returned as hosts of an EHF EURO after 18 years in 2018 for what would be the last Men's European Championship with 16 nations participating. Led by iconic coach Lino Červar, the hosts had high hopes, especially after winning bronze in 2016, but came up just short to Sweden in the tense final standings of the main round.One of the standout players of the event was Czech Ondřej Zdráhala, who scored 14 times against Hungary and 13 against Croatia to finish on a tournament-leading 56 goals. In the end, however, it was all about Spain. They finally lifted the trophy for the first time after losing four previous finals. Coming from behind at half-time, Spain defeated Sweden 29:23 for European glory. France downed Denmark for bronze.

EHF EURO 2020 marked the beginning of a new era for Europe's continental national team competition. For the first time, a total of 24 teams took part, eight more than under the previous format. Also for the first time, three nations were co-hosting the event: Sweden, Austria and Norway overcame the logistic challenges and turned the tournament into an overwhelming success story. While EHF EURO 2020 provided the many fans across Europe with lots of unexpected results – favourites like France and Denmark failed to advance from the preliminary round – the winners were no surprise, as Spain defended their title from two years earlier with a 22:20 final win over Croatia, while co-hosts Norway took bronze.

=== 2022–present ===
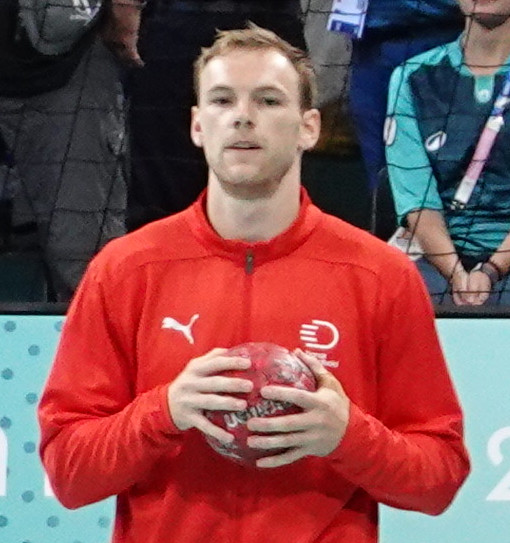
Mathias Gidsel make a debut for Denmark in 2020.

Although Euro 2022 was disrupted by a resurgence of the COVID-19 pandemic—around one hundred players and staff members were forced to isolate for several days after testing positive in daily tests—Spain reached the final of the competition once again but was this time defeated by Sweden. After 20 years without a title, Sweden won their fifth European Championship, following victories in 1994, 1998, 2000, and 2002. In the third-place match, Denmark, the two-time reigning World Champions, defeated France, who had won the Olympic title six months earlier. Swedish centre-back Jim Gottfridsson was named the tournament's Most Valuable Player, while Iceland's Ómar Ingi Magnússon finished as top scorer with 59 goals.

The EHF EURO 2024 was the 16th edition of the tournament. It took place from 10 to 28 January 2024 in Germany. The two opening games of the tournament were attended by 53,586 spectators, setting a world record for the largest audience at a handball event. Additionally, the tournament achieved a record for the highest total number of spectators in handball history, becoming the first to exceed one million attendees.

While France and Denmark have dominated world handball—winning 8 of 9 World Championship titles between 2009 and 2025 and all five Olympic titles from 2008 to 2024—neither team had reached a European Championship final since their encounter at Euro 2014. In this edition in Germany, both nations returned to the final, benefiting in particular from the early elimination of Spain during the preliminary round. As in previous international competitions, Sweden, the defending champions, were the main rivals of Denmark—who only won their main round match by one goal—and of France, who advanced to the final after a semi-final victory in overtime, secured at the last second of regulation by an exceptional free throw from Elohim Prandi.

Sweden later claimed the bronze medal two days later, defeating the host nation Germany 34–31, after Germany had been beaten by Denmark in the other semi-final (26–29). In the final, France trailed Denmark for much of the match, with the Danes particularly boosted by goalkeeper Emil Nielsen, who finished the game with nearly 40% saves (15 stops from 39 shots). Nevertheless, France forced overtime and then accelerated in the final 10 minutes to win 33–31, earning their fourth European Championship title in history. Denmark settled for the silver medal, adding to their two crowns from 2008 and 2012. French player Nedim Remili was named Most Valuable Player, while Martim Costa of Portugal and Mathias Gidsel of Denmark finished as the tournament's top scorers with 54 goals each. Nikola Karabatić won his eleventh international title with this victory.

The EHF EURO 2026 was the 17th edition of the tournament. It was the second time after 2020 that three countries hosted the tournament. Co-host Denmark won their third title, first since (2012) by defeating Germany in the final (34–27), Croatia captured the bronze medal, their first European Medal since 2020 by defeating Iceland in the bronze medal match (34–33) who appeared in the medal race after 16 years. Portugal defeated co-host Sweden in the 5th place match and ended up with the best result at European Championships while other co-host Norway finished 9th and defending champions France finished 7th.

Before their semifinal against Germany, Croatian coach, Dagur Sigurðsson criticized the schedule as his team had to play two games in less than 24 hours and then go on a bus the Herning, meaning they had no training day before their semifinal, as well as the fact that the Croatian team as the only semifinalists had to stay in Silkeborg, 40 km away, rather than in Herning.[123] As a response, the EHF acknowledged the criticism and stated that changes will be made in the future.

== Tournaments ==
Year	Host	Final			Third place match			Teams
Year	Host	Champions	Score	Runners-up	Third place	Score	Fourth place	Teams
1994; Details	Portugal	Sweden	34–21	Russia	Croatia	24–23	Denmark	12
1996; Details	Spain	Russia	23–22	Spain	FR Yugoslavia	26–25	Sweden	12
1998; Details	Italy	Sweden	25–23	Spain	Germany	30–28 (ET)	Russia	12
2000; Details	Croatia	Sweden	32–31 (2ET)	Russia	Spain	24–23	France	12
2002; Details	Sweden	Sweden	33–31 (ET)	Germany	Denmark	29–22	Iceland	16
2004; Details	Slovenia	Germany	30–25	Slovenia	Denmark	31–27	Croatia	16
2006; Details	Switzerland	France	31–23	Spain	Denmark	32–27	Croatia	16
2008; Details	Norway	Denmark	24–20	Croatia	France	36–26	Germany	16
2010; Details	Austria	France	25–21	Croatia	Iceland	29–26	Poland	16
2012; Details	Serbia	Denmark	21–19	Serbia	Croatia	31–27	Spain	16
2014; Details	Denmark	France	41–32	Denmark	Spain	29–28	Croatia	16
2016; Details	Poland	Germany	24–17	Spain	Croatia	31–24	Norway	16
2018; Details	Croatia	Spain	29–23	Sweden	France	32–29	Denmark	16
2020; Details	Austria / Norway / Sweden	Spain	22–20	Croatia	Norway	28–20	Slovenia	24
2022; Details	Hungary / Slovakia	Sweden	27–26	Spain	Denmark	35–32 (ET)	France	24
2024; Details	Germany	France	33–31 (ET)	Denmark	Sweden	34–31	Germany	24
2026; Details	Denmark / Norway / Sweden	Denmark	34–27	Germany	Croatia	34–33	Iceland	24
2028; Details	Portugal / Spain / Switzerland							24
2030; Details	Czech Republic / Denmark / Poland							24
2032; Details	France / Germany							24

== Medal table ==
Rank	Nation	Gold	Silver	Bronze	Total
1	Sweden	5	1	1	7
2	France	4	0	2	6
3	Denmark	3	2	4	9
4	Spain	2	5	2	9
5	Germany	2	2	1	5
6	Russia	1	2	0	3
7	Croatia	0	3	4	7
8	Serbia	0	1	1	2
9	Slovenia	0	1	0	1
10	Iceland	0	0	1	1
10	Norway	0	0	1	1
Totals (11 entries)		17	17	17	51

== Statistics ==
=== Summary (1994–2024) ===
Source (Table Section):

Rank	Team	Part	M	W	D	L	GF	GA	GD	Points
1	Spain	16	114	76	8	30	3197	2920	+277	160
2	France	16	113	73	10	30	3218	2931	+287	156
4	Denmark	15	110	71	5	34	3094	2820	+274	147
3	Croatia	16	114	66	10	38	3077	2938	+139	142
5	Sweden	15	105	67	6	32	2881	2630	+251	140
6	Germany	15	106	55	13	38	2837	2673	+164	123
7	Russia	14	83	42	8	33	2251	2190	+61	92
9	Norway	11	69	35	6	28	1986	1888	+98	76
8	Iceland	13	78	32	10	36	2214	2246	−32	74
10	Slovenia	14	87	32	9	46	2339	2437	−98	73
12	Hungary	14	75	25	11	39	1938	2059	−121	61
11	Serbia	13	65	23	8	34	1684	1742	−58	54
13	Poland	11	59	22	5	32	1618	1693	−75	49
14	Czech Republic	12	60	18	5	37	1585	1693	−108	41
15	Portugal	8	43	14	2	27	1155	1223	−68	30
17	North Macedonia	8	40	9	6	25	988	1126	−138	24
18	Austria	6	32	9	5	18	910	954	−44	23
16	Belarus	7	37	11	1	25	1012	1129	−117	23
19	Netherlands	3	17	6	2	9	504	531	−27	14
20	Montenegro	7	28	5	1	22	706	837	−131	11
21	Romania	3	15	4	0	11	369	415	−46	8
23	Switzerland	5	18	2	3	13	448	532	−84	7
22	Ukraine	7	31	3	1	27	775	894	−119	7
24	Lithuania	2	9	2	1	6	220	246	−26	5
25	Italy	1	6	2	0	4	133	148	−15	4
26	Slovakia	4	12	1	1	10	303	390	−87	3
27	Georgia	1	3	1	0	2	77	95	−18	2
28	Faroe Islands	1	3	0	1	2	83	90	−7	1
29	Israel	1	3	0	0	3	67	82	−15	0
30	Latvia	1	3	0	0	3	73	93	−20	0
31	Greece	1	3	0	0	3	72	100	−28	0
32	Bosnia and Herzegovina	3	9	0	0	9	193	262	−69	0

=== Total hosts ===
Hosts	Nations (Year(s)
3	Denmark (2014, 2026, 2030); Norway (2008, 2020, 2026); Sweden (2002, 2020, 2026')
2	Austria (2010, 2020); Croatia (2000, 2018); Germany (2024, 2032); Poland (2016, 2030); Portugal (1994, 2028); Spain (1996, 2028); Switzerland (2006, 2028)
1	Czech Republic (2030); France (2032); Hungary (2022); Italy (1998); Serbia (2012); Slovakia (2022); Slovenia (2004)

=== Top scorers by tournament ===
The record-holder for scored goals in a single Euro Championship is Mathias Gidsel. He scored 68 goals for Denmark at the 2026 European Men's Handball Championship that took place in Denmark, Sweden and Norway.

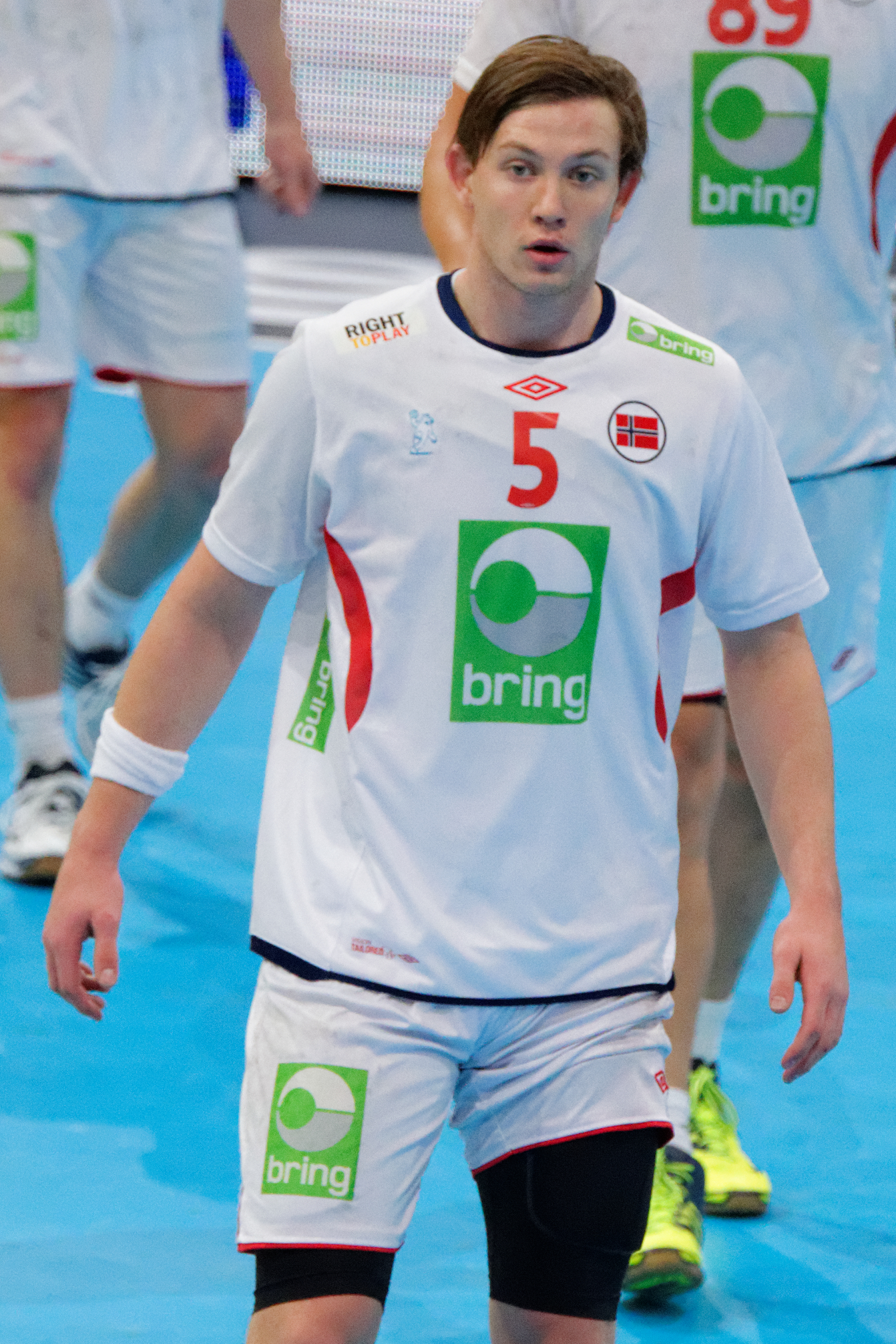
Mathias Gidsel scored 68 goals at the 2026 EHF EURO. This is the highest number of goals scored by a single player in a single tournament in the history of the championship.

Year	Player	Goals
1994	(Russia) Vasily Kudinov	50
1996	(Germany) Thomas Knorr	41
1998	(Czech Republic) Jan Filip	48
2000	(Ukraine) Oleg Velyky	46
2002	(Iceland) Ólafur Stefánsson	58
2004	(Croatia) Mirza Džomba	46
2006	(Slovenia) Siarhei Rutenka	51
2008	(Croatia) Ivano Balić (Denmark) Lars Christiansen (France) Nikola Karabatić	44
2010	(Czech Republic) Filip Jícha	53
2012	(North Macedonia) Kiril Lazarov	61
2014	(Spain) Joan Cañellas	50
2016	(Spain) Valero Rivera	48
2018	(Czech Republic) Ondřej Zdráhala	55
2020	(Norway) Sander Sagosen	65
2022	(Iceland) Ómar Ingi Magnússon	59
2024	(Portugal) Martim Costa (Denmark) Mathias Gidsel	54
2026	(Denmark) Mathias Gidsel	68

=== MVPs by tournament ===
Year	Player
1994	(Sweden) Magnus Andersson
1996	(Spain) Talant Dujshebaev
1998	(Germany) Daniel Stephan
2000	(France) Jackson Richardson
2002	(Sweden) Magnus Wislander
2004	(Croatia) Ivano Balić
2006	(Croatia) Ivano Balić
2008	(France) Nikola Karabatić
2010	(Czech Republic) Filip Jícha
2012	(Serbia) Momir Ilić
2014	(France) Nikola Karabatić
2016	(Spain) Raúl Entrerríos
2018	(Sweden) Jim Gottfridsson
2020	(Croatia) Domagoj Duvnjak
2022	(Sweden) Jim Gottfridsson
2024	(France) Nedim Remili
2026	(Denmark) Mathias Gidsel

== Participating nations ==
Legend

- 1st – Champions
- 2nd – Runners-up
- 3rd – Third place
- 4th – Fourth place
- 5th – Fifth place
- 6th – Sixth place
- 7th – Seventh place
- 8th – Eighth place
- 9th – Ninth place
- 10th – Tenth place
- 11th – Eleventh place
- 12th – Twelfth place
- MR – Main round
- GS – Group stage
- Q – Qualified for upcoming tournament
- q – may still qualify for upcoming tournament
- • – Did not qualify
- •× – Disqualified
- × – Did not enter / Withdrew / Banned
- – Hosts

Team	(Portugal) 1994	(Spain) 1996	(Italy) 1998	(Croatia) 2000	(Sweden) 2002	(Slovenia) 2004	(Switzerland) 2006	(Norway) 2008	(Austria) 2010	(Serbia) 2012	(Denmark) 2014	(Poland) 2016	(Croatia) 2018	(Austria) (Norway) (Sweden) 2020	(Hungary) (Slovakia) 2022	(Germany) 2024	(Denmark) (Norway) (Sweden) 2026	(Portugal) (Spain) (Switzerland) 2028	(Czech Republic) (Denmark) (Poland) 2030	(France) (Germany) 2032	Participations
Austria	•	•	•	•	•	•	•	•	9th	•	11th	•	15th	8th	20th	8th	16th				7
Belarus	8th	•	•	•	•	•	•	15th	•	•	12th	10th	10th	10th	17th	×	×				7
Bosnia and Herzegovina	•	•	•	•	•	•	•	•	•	•	•	•	•	23rd	23rd	24th	•				3
Croatia	3rd	5th	8th	6th	16th	4th	4th	2nd	2nd	3rd	4th	3rd	5th	2nd	8th	11th	3rd				17
Czech Republic	•	6th	10th	•	8th	11th	•	13th	8th	14th	15th	•	6th	12th	13th	15th	17th		Q		13
Denmark	4th	12th	•	10th	3rd	3rd	3rd	1st	5th	1st	2nd	6th	4th	13th	3rd	2nd	1st	Q	Q		17
Faroe Islands	•	•	•	•	•	•	•	×	•	×	×	×	×	•	•	20th	13th				2
France	6th	7th	7th	4th	6th	6th	1st	3rd	1st	11th	1st	5th	3rd	14th	4th	1st	7th			Q	17
Georgia	•	•	•	•	•	•	•	•	×	•	×	×	•	•	•	18th	20th				2
Germany	9th	8th	3rd	9th	2nd	1st	5th	4th	10th	7th	•	1st	9th	5th	7th	4th	2nd			Q	16
Greece	•	•	•	•	•	•	•	•	•	•	•	•	•	•	•	23rd	•				1
Hungary	7th	10th	6th	•	•	9th	13th	8th	14th	8th	8th	12th	14th	9th	15th	5th	10th				15
Iceland	•	•	•	11th	4th	13th	7th	11th	3rd	10th	5th	13th	13th	11th	6th	10th	4th				14
Israel	•	•	•	•	14th	•	•	•	•	•	•	•	•	•	•	•	•				1
Italy	•	•	11th	•	•	•	•	•	•	•	•	•	•	•	•	•	18th				2
Latvia	•	•	•	•	•	•	•	•	•	•	•	•	•	24th	•	•	•				1
Lithuania	•	•	9th	•	•	•	•	•	•	•	•	•	•	•	21st	•	•				2
Montenegro^{1}								12th	•	•	16th	16th	16th	18th	11th	14th	23rd				8
Netherlands	•	•	•	•	•	•	•	•	•	•	•	•	•	17th	10th	12th	15th				4
North Macedonia	×	•	12th	•	•	•	•	•	•	5th	10th	11th	11th	15th	22nd	17th	14th				9
Norway	•	•	•	8th	•	•	11th	6th	7th	13th	14th	4th	7th	3rd	5th	9th	9th				12
Poland	•	•	•	•	15th	16th	10th	7th	4th	9th	6th	7th	•	21st	12th	16th	21st		Q		12
Portugal	12th	•	•	7th	9th	14th	15th	•	•	•	•	•	•	6th	19th	7th	5th	Q			10
Romania	11th	9th	•	•	•	•	•	•	•	•	•	•	•	•	•	22nd	22nd				4
Russia	2nd	1st	4th	2nd	5th	5th	6th	14th	12th	15th	9th	9th	•	22nd	9th	×	×				14
Serbia^{1}								•	13th	2nd	13th	15th	12th	20th	14th	19th	19th				9
Slovakia	•	•	•	•	•	•	16th	16th	•	16th	•	•	•	•	18th	•	•				4
Slovenia	10th	11th	•	5th	12th	2nd	8th	10th	11th	6th	•	14th	8th	4th	16th	6th	8th				15
Spain	5th	2nd	2nd	3rd	7th	10th	2nd	9th	6th	4th	3rd	2nd	1st	1st	2nd	13th	11th	Q			18
Sweden	1st	4th	1st	1st	1st	7th	•	5th	15th	12th	7th	8th	2nd	7th	1st	3rd	6th				16
Switzerland	•	•	•	•	13th	12th	14th	•	•	•	•	•	•	16th	•	21st	12th	Q			7
Ukraine	•	•	•	12th	11th	15th	12th	•	16th	•	•	•	•	19th	24th	•	24th				8
Historical national teams
Serbia and Montenegro^{1}						8th	9th														2
FR Yugoslavia^{1}	×	3rd	5th		10th																3
Total	12	12	12	12	16	16	16	16	16	16	16	16	16	24	24	24	24	24	24	24	

^{1} FR Yugoslavia competed as such until 2003 when the FRY was reconstituted as a State Union Serbia and Montenegro. Since the dissolution of the union in 2006, national teams exist for both countries.

== Most successful players ==
The table shows the most successful players at the European Championships. Players marked with an asterisk (*) have the additional distinction of having been elected championship MVP.

Rank	Player	Country	From	To	Gold	Silver	Bronze	Total
1	Nikola Karabatić **	France	2006	2024	4	–	2	6
2	Magnus Andersson *	Sweden	1994	2002	4	–	–	4
2	Martin Frändesjö	Sweden	1994	2002	4	–	–	4
2	Ola Lindgren	Sweden	1994	2002	4	–	–	4
2	Stefan Lövgren	Sweden	1994	2002	4	–	–	4
2	Staffan Olsson	Sweden	1994	2002	4	–	–	4
2	Magnus Wislander *	Sweden	1994	2002	4	–	–	4
8	Luc Abalo	France	2006	2018	3	–	2	5
9	Jérôme Fernandez	France	2006	2014	3	–	1	4
9	Michaël Guigou	France	2006	2018	3	–	1	4
9	Daniel Narcisse	France	2006	2014	3	–	1	4
9	Thierry Omeyer	France	2006	2014	3	–	1	4

== See also ==
- EHF Euro Cup
