= 2009 Davis Cup World Group play-offs =

Group of tennis matches

The World Group play-offs were the main play-offs of 2009 Davis Cup. Winners advanced to the World Group, and losers were relegated to Zonal Regions I.

== Teams ==
Bold indicates team has qualified for the 2012 Davis Cup World Group.

From World Group

- Netherlands
- **France**
- **Switzerland**
- **Chile**
- **Sweden**
- Romania
- Austria
- **Serbia**

From Americas Group I

- Brazil
- **Ecuador**

From Asia/Oceania Group I

- **India**
- Uzbekistan

From Europe/Africa Group I

- Italy
- South Africa
- Ukraine
- **Belgium**

== Results ==
**Seeded teams**

- Austria
- Belgium
- Brazil
- France
- India
- Serbia
- Sweden
- Switzerland

**Unseeded teams**

- Chile
- Ecuador
- Netherlands
- Italy
- Romania
- South Africa
- Ukraine
- Uzbekistan

Home team	Score	Visiting team	Location	Venue	Door	Surface
**Chile**	3–2	Austria	Rancagua	Medialuna Monumental de Rancagua	Outdoor	Clay
**Belgium**	3–2	Ukraine	Charleroi	Spiroudome de Charleroi	Indoor	Clay
Brazil	2–3	**Ecuador**	Porto Alegre	Ginásio Gigantinho	Indoor	Clay
Netherlands	1–4	**France**	Maastricht	MECC Maastricht	Indoor	Clay
South Africa	1–4	**India**	Johannesburg	Ellis Park Indoor Arena	Indoor	Hard
**Serbia**	5–0	Uzbekistan	Belgrade	Belgrade Arena	Indoor	Hard
**Sweden**	4–1	Romania	Helsingborg	Idrottens Hus	Indoor	Hard
Italy	2–3	**Switzerland**	Genova	Valletta Cambiaso Club	Outdoor	Clay

- Chile, France, Serbia, Sweden and Switzerland will remain in the World Group in 2010.
- Belgium, Ecuador, and India are promoted to the World Group in 2010.
- Brazil, Italy, South Africa, Ukraine and Uzbekistan will remain in Zonal Group I in 2010.
- Austria, Netherlands and Romania are relegated to Zonal Group I in 2010.

== Playoff results ==
=== Chile vs. Austria ===
Chile
3
Medialuna Monumental de Rancagua, Rancagua, Chile
18–20 September 2009
Clay

Austria
2

			1	2	3	4	5
1	(Chile) (Austria)	**Nicolás Massú**; Jürgen Melzer	4; **6**	**6**; 4	**6**; 4	**6**; 3
2	(Chile) (Austria)	**Paul Capdeville**; Stefan Koubek	**6**; 4	**6**; 4	3; **6**	1; **6**	**6**; 4
3	(Chile) (Austria)	Paul Capdeville / Nicolás Massú; **Julian Knowle / Jürgen Melzer**	2; **6**	4; **6**	3; **6**
4	(Chile) (Austria)	Paul Capdeville; **Jürgen Melzer**	6^{2} **7^{7}**	**6**; 4	2; **6**	**7**; 5	4; **6**
5	(Chile) (Austria)	**Nicolás Massú**; Stefan Koubek	**6**; 4	4; **6**	**6**; 4	**7^{8}** 6^{6}

=== Belgium vs. Ukraine ===
Belgium
3
Spiroudome de Charleroi, Charleroi, Belgium
18–20 September 2009
Clay (i)

Ukraine
2

			1	2	3	4	5
1	(Belgium) (Ukraine)	**Olivier Rochus**; Illya Marchenko	**6**; 3	**6**; 4	3; **6**	**6**; 1
2	(Belgium) (Ukraine)	**Steve Darcis**; Sergiy Stakhovsky	**6**; 2	**6**; 3	**6**; 4
3	(Belgium) (Ukraine)	Xavier Malisse / Christophe Rochus; **Sergei Bubka / Sergiy Stakhovsky**	6^{5} **7^{7}**	**6**; 3	4; **6**	6^{4} **7^{7}**
4	(Belgium) (Ukraine)	Xavier Malisse; **Sergiy Stakhovsky**	3; **6**	**6**; 3	**6**; 0	1; **6**	3; **6**
5	(Belgium) (Ukraine)	**Steve Darcis**; Sergei Bubka	**6**; 2	**6**; 1	**6**; 0

=== Brazil vs. Ecuador ===
Brazil
2
Ginásio Gigantinho, Porto Alegre, Brazil
18–20 September 2009
Clay (i)

Ecuador
3

			1	2	3	4	5
1	(Brazil) (Ecuador)	**Marcos Daniel**; Giovanni Lapentti	**7^{7}** 6^{3}	3; **6**	**7^{7}** 6^{4}	**6**; 2
2	(Brazil) (Ecuador)	Thomaz Bellucci; **Nicolás Lapentti**	6^{2} **7^{7}**	4; **6**	5; **7**
3	(Brazil) (Ecuador)	Marcelo Melo / André Sá; **Giovanni Lapentti / Nicolás Lapentti**	**6**; 3	3; **6**	4; **6**	**6**; 4	4; **6**
4	(Brazil) (Ecuador)	Marcos Daniel; **Nicolás Lapentti**	4; **6**	4; **6**	**6**; 1	**6**; 2	6; **8**
5	(Brazil) (Ecuador)	**Thomaz Bellucci**; Julio-Cesar Campozano	**6**; 2	**6**; 4

=== Netherlands vs. France ===
Netherlands
1
MECC Maastricht, Maastricht, Netherlands
18–20 September 2009
Clay (i)

France
4

			1	2	3	4	5
1	(Netherlands) (France)	**Thiemo de Bakker**; Gaël Monfils	**6**; 3	5; **7**	**6**; 3	**6**; 4
2	(Netherlands) (France)	Jesse Huta Galung; **Jo-Wilfried Tsonga**	6^{2} **7^{7}**	2; **6**	6^{3} **7^{7}**
3	(Netherlands) (France)	Thiemo de Bakker / Igor Sijsling; **Michaël Llodra / Jo-Wilfried Tsonga**	3; **6**	**6**; 3	6^{2} **7^{7}**	4; **6**
4	(Netherlands) (France)	Thiemo de Bakker; **Jo-Wilfried Tsonga**	6^{5} **7^{7}**	2; **6**	**6**; 3	6^{4} **7^{7}**
5	(Netherlands) (France)	Jesse Huta Galung; **Jérémy Chardy**	3; **6**	2; **6**

=== South Africa vs. India ===
South Africa
1
Ellis Park Indoor Arena, Johannesburg, South Africa
18–20 September 2009
Hard (i)

India
4

			1	2	3	4	5
1	(South Africa) (India)	Izak van der Merwe; **Somdev Devvarman**	6^{5} **7^{7}**	3; **6**	4; **6**
2	(South Africa) (India)	Rik de Voest; **Rohan Bopanna**	**6**; 2	2; **6**	2; **6**	4; **6**
3	(South Africa) (India)	**Jeff Coetzee / Wesley Moodie**; Mahesh Bhupathi / Rohan Bopanna	**6**; 3	3; **6**	4; 0			**retired**
4	(South Africa) (India)	Rik de Voest; **Somdev Devvarman**	**6**; 3	**7^{7}** 6^{3}	6^{5} **7^{7}**	2; **6**	4; **6**
5	(South Africa) (India)	Izak van der Merwe; **Yuki Bhambri**	**6**; 3	3; **6**	4; **6**

=== Serbia vs. Uzbekistan ===
Serbia
5
Belgrade Arena, Belgrade, Serbia
18–20 September 2009
Hard (i)

Uzbekistan
0

			1	2	3	4	5
1	(Serbia) (Uzbekistan)	**Janko Tipsarević**; Denis Istomin	**6**; 2	5; **7**	**6**; 1	**6**; 4
2	(Serbia) (Uzbekistan)	**Viktor Troicki**; Farrukh Dustov	**6**; 4	3; **6**	**6**; 3	4; **6**	**6**; 2
3	(Serbia) (Uzbekistan)	**Janko Tipsarević / Nenad Zimonjić**; Farrukh Dustov / Denis Istomin	**6**; 2	**6**; 3	**6**; 2
4	(Serbia) (Uzbekistan)	**Viktor Troicki**; Murad Inoyatov	4; **6**	**6**; 4	**6**; 3
5	(Serbia) (Uzbekistan)	**Ilija Bozoljac**; Vaja Uzakov	**6**; 1	**6**; 4

=== Sweden vs. Romania ===
Sweden
4
Idrottens Hus, Helsingborg, Sweden
18–20 September 2009
Hard (i)

Romania
1

			1	2	3	4	5
1	(Sweden) (Romania)	Andreas Vinciguerra; **Victor Hănescu**	6^{5} **7^{7}**	6^{10} **7^{12}**	0; 0			**retired**
2	(Sweden) (Romania)	**Robin Söderling**; Victor Crivoi	**6**; 2	**6**; 1	**7**; 5
3	(Sweden) (Romania)	**Robert Lindstedt / Robin Söderling**; Victor Hănescu / Horia Tecău	**6**; 1	**7^{9}** 6^{7}	**7^{7}** 6^{5}
4	(Sweden) (Romania)	**Robin Söderling**; Victor Hănescu	**7**; 5	**6**; 1	**6**; 0
5	(Sweden) (Romania)	**Andreas Vinciguerra**; Marius Copil	**6**; 4					**retired**

=== Italy vs. Switzerland ===
Italy
2
Valletta Cambiaso Club, Genova, Italy
18–20 September 2009
Clay

Switzerland
3

			1	2	3	4	5
1	(Italy) (Switzerland)	Andreas Seppi; **Stanislas Wawrinka**	4; **6**	1; **6**	2; **6**
2	(Italy) (Switzerland)	Simone Bolelli; **Roger Federer**	3; **6**	4; **6**	1; **6**
3	(Italy) (Switzerland)	**Simone Bolelli / Potito Starace**; Marco Chiudinelli / Stanislas Wawrinka	**6**; 2	**6**; 4	**7^{7}** 6^{3}
4	(Italy) (Switzerland)	Potito Starace; **Roger Federer**	3; **6**	0; **6**	4; **6**
5	(Italy) (Switzerland)	**Fabio Fognini**; Michael Lammer	**7**; 5	**7^{7}** 6^{4}
