= JóiPé & Króli =

Icelandic hip hop duo

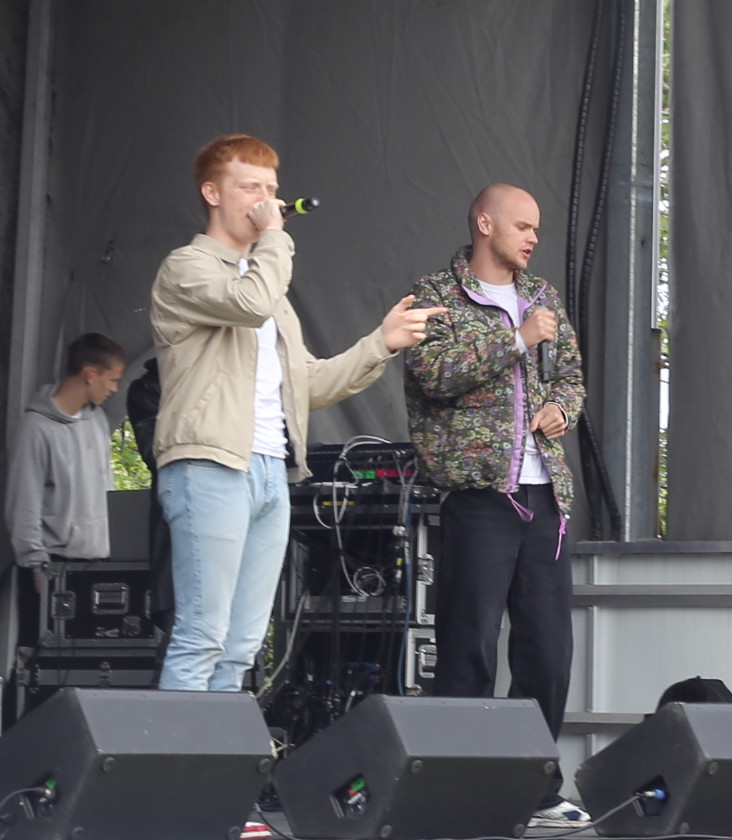
Performing at Icelandic National Day 2022

JóiPé & Króli are an Icelandic hip hop duo consisting of Jóhannes Damian Patreksson (JóiPé, born 2000) and Kristinn Óli Haraldsson (Króli, born 1999). They first became known for their 2017 summer hit song "B.O.B.A." They had the best selling album in Iceland in 2018 and won the 2018 Icelandic Music Awards for hip hop album of the year and hip hop song of the year.

== Career ==
JóiPé & Króli began their collaboration in early 2017 when they were both in junior college. JóiPé is from Garðabær and Króli from Hafnarfjörður. JóiPé is son of handball player Patrekur Jóhannesson and nephew of former president of Iceland Guðni Th. Jóhannesson.

The duo first became known for their 2017 summer hit song "B.O.B.A." It topped Icelandic music charts and (although being extremely disputed) has been called one of the most popular Icelandic songs of all time. It is a lighthearted and witty hip hop song referencing Hyundai i30 and Ronda Rousey. The song's name references a well-known slipup by Bubbi Morthens in 2002 when he misspelled bomba ("bomb") when giving live commentary on a boxing match. The song was produced by Þormóður Eiríksson from Ísafjörður.

Later albums would also become popular in Iceland. JóiPé's is noted for his baritone voice which contrasts with Króli's tenor. The song "Í átt að tunglinu" won the 2018 Icelandic Music Awards as hip hop song of the year. They performed the final song of the 2018 Áramótaskaupið.

== Albums ==
- Ananas (2017)
- GerviGlingur (2017)
- Afsakið hlé (2018) – Best selling album in 2018 in Iceland, won the Icelandic Music Awards as hip hop album of the year.
- 22:40-08:16 (2018)
- Í miðjum kjarnorkuvetri (2020)
