= Magnus Wislander =

Swedish handball player (born 1964)

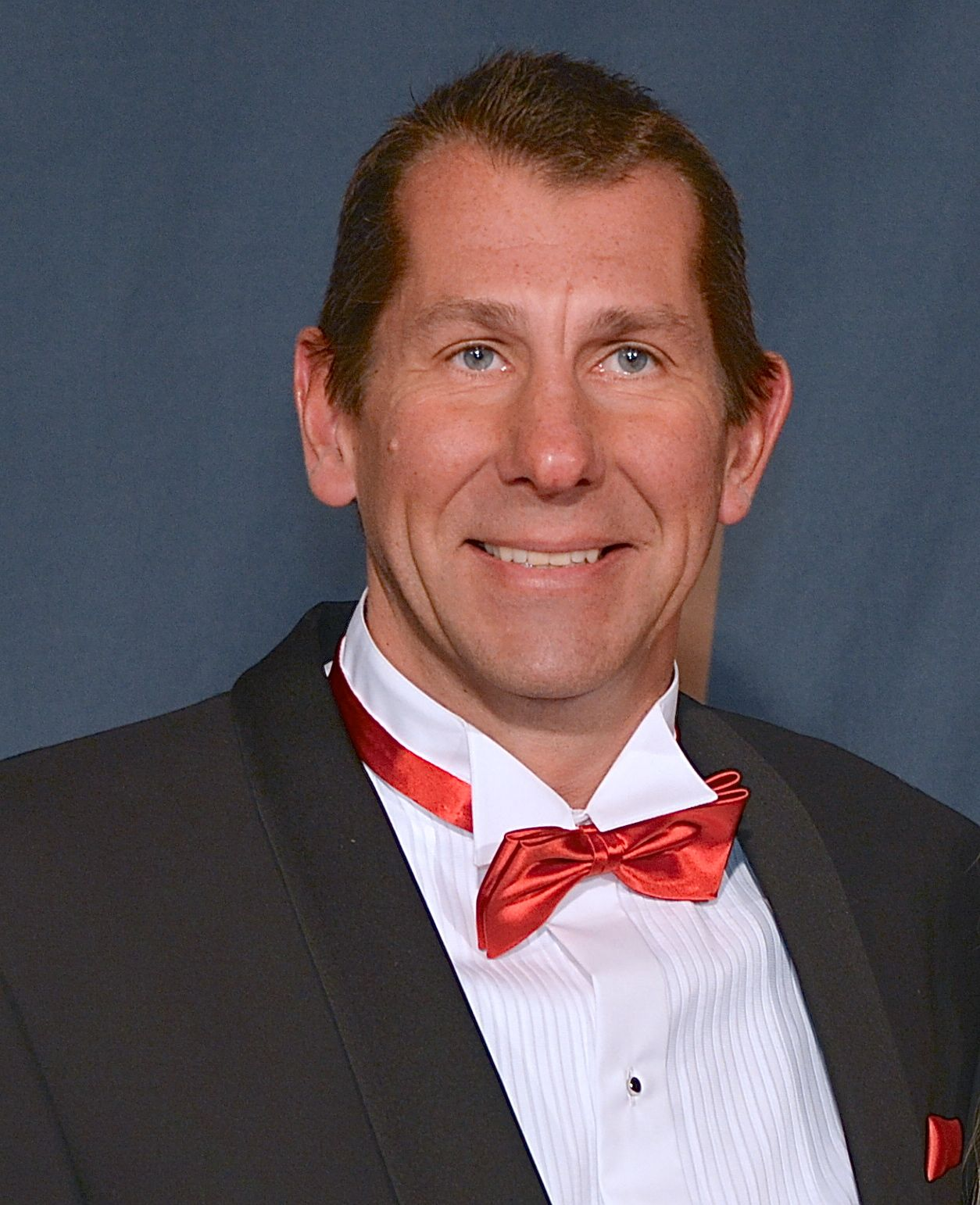
- Magnus Wislander at the Swedish Sports Awards inside the Ericsson Globe in Stockholm, Sweden in January 2013

Personal information
- Full name: Hans Einar Magnus Wislander
- Born: 22 February 1964 (age 62) Gothenburg, Sweden
- Height: 1.96 m (6 ft 5 in)

Sport
- Sport: Handball
- Position: Centre back, Pivot

Youth career
- Years: Team
- 1973–1979: Tuve IF
- 1979–1983: Redbergslids IK

Senior clubs
- Years: Team
- 1983–1990: Redbergslids IK
- 1990–2002: THW Kiel
- 2002–2005: Redbergslids IK
National team
Years	Team	Apps	(Gls)
1985–2002	Sweden	386	(1191)
Medal record
Men's handball
Representing Sweden
Olympic Games
Silver medal – second place	1992 Barcelona	Team competition
Silver medal – second place	1996 Atlanta	Team competition
Silver medal – second place	2000 Sydney	Team competition
World Men's Handball Championship
Gold medal – first place	1999 Egypt	Team competition
Gold medal – first place	1990 Czechoslovakia	Team competition
Silver medal – second place	2001 France	Team competition
Silver medal – second place	1997 Japan	Team competition
Bronze medal – third place	1995 Iceland	Team competition
Bronze medal – third place	1993 Sweden	Team competition
European Men's Handball Championship
Gold medal – first place	2002 Sweden	Team competition
Gold medal – first place	2000 Croatia	Team competition
Gold medal – first place	1998 Italy	Team competition
Gold medal – first place	1994 Portugal	Team competition

Hans Einar Magnus Wislander (born 22 February 1964) is a Swedish former handball player, who has been voted Handball Player of the Century and is widely regarded as one of the best players ever. Debuting with the national team in 1985, he played 386 games and scored 1,191 goals, a record for both most matches and most goals for the Sweden national team. He played for Redbergslids IK, Gothenburg and THW Kiel. In 1990 he was named IHF World Player of the Year.

He was included in the European Handball Federation Hall of Fame in 2023.

He played primarily as a centre back, but transitioned to be a pivot in his latter years. He has earned the nickname 'Slangen' (The hose).

== Career ==
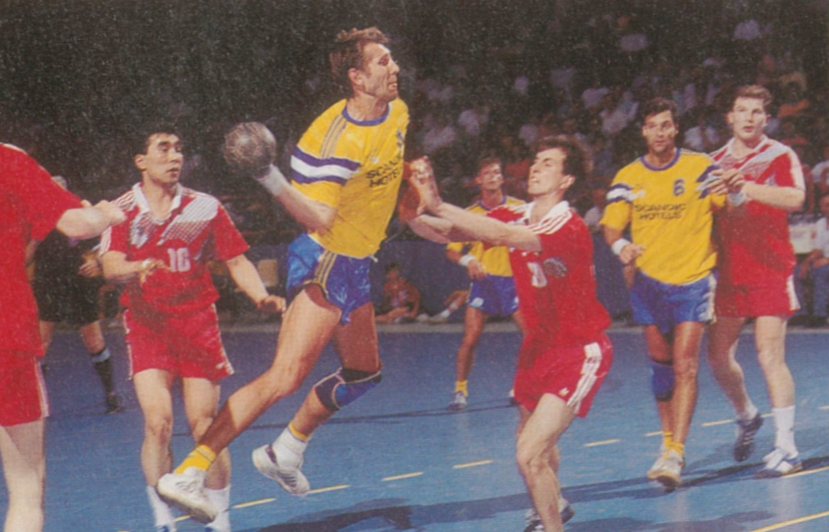
Wislander in 1992

Wislander started playing handball at Tuve IF, before joining Gothenburg club Redbergslids IK in 1979. Here he won the Swedish championship 4 times. In 1990 he joined German top club THW Kiel, where he played until 2002 and won the German championship 7 times. He played 369 league matches for the club, scoring 1,371 goals and captained theteam from 1991 2001. He then returned Redbergslids IK as player-coach. In 2003 he won his fifth Swedish championship. He retired in 2005, and continued as the coach. He continued as a coach until 2022.

In November 2011 he made a one game comeback at the age of 47 for Redbergslids IK against Hammarby IF. He played for 6 minutes and scored one goal.

At Kiel, his shirtnumber (#2) is retired and hangs under the roof at the Kiel home arena Ostseehalle.

== Post-playing career ==
Wislander has worked as a handball expert on Swedish radio and a postal worker at PostNord.

== Club Honours ==
=== Redbergslid ===
- Elitserien (5): 1984–85, 1985–86, 1986–87, 1988–89, 2002–03

=== Kiel ===
- Bundesliga (7): 1993–94, 1994–95, 1995–96, 1997–98, 1998–99, 1999–00, 2001–02
- DHB-Pokal (3): 1998, 1999, 2000
- Supercup (2): 1995, 1998
- EHF Cup (2): 1998, 2002

== Individual ==
- IHF World Player of the Year - 1990
- Best player of the 20th century by: IHF
- Best player of the 20th century by: Sweden
- Elected best player of THW Kiel in the 20th century
- Record for caps and goals in the Swedish national team
- Best player at 2002 European Championship
- Elected best handball player of the year in Sweden: 1986 and 1990
- Elected best handball player of the year in Germany: 2000
- Voted Best foreign player of Bundesliga: 1994, 1995, 1996
- Voted Best Player THW Kiel: 1994, 1995, 1996, 1997, 1998, 1999
- EHF Hall of Fame: 2023

== World Championships ==
- 1990 - gold
- 1993 - bronze
- 1995 - bronze
- 1997 - silver
- 1999 - gold
- 2001 - silver

== European Championships ==
- 1994 - gold
- 1998 - gold
- 2000 - gold
- 2002 - gold

== See also ==
- List of men's handballers with 1000 or more international goals
