= Patrekur Jóhannesson =

Icelandic handball player (born 1972)

Patrekur Jóhanesson
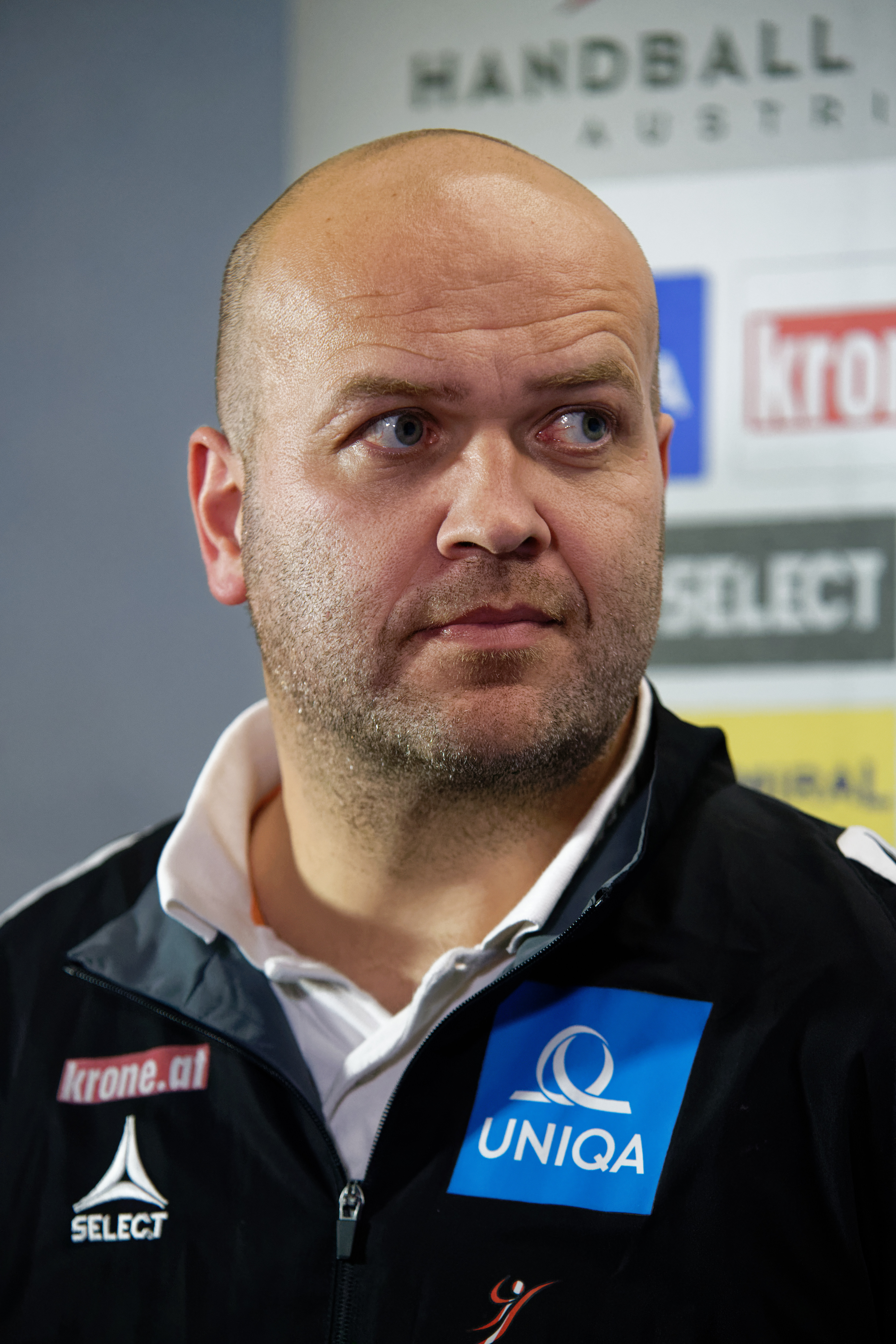

Personal information
- Nationality: Icelandic
- Born: 7 July 1972 (age 54) Reykjavík, Iceland
- Height: 1.95 m (6 ft 5 in)

Sport
- Sport: Handball
- Position: Left/Centre back

Senior clubs
- Years: Team
- 1989–1994: Stjarnan
- 1994–1996: KA Akureyri
- 1996–2003: TUSEM Essen
- 2003–2004: CD Bidasoa
- 2005–2008: Stjarnan
National team
Years	Team	Apps	(Gls)
1992–2006	Iceland	241	(634)

Teams managed
- 2005–2008: Stjarnan (assistant)
- 2009–2010: Stjarnan
- 2010–2011: TV Emsdetten
- 2013: Valur
- 2013–2015: Haukar
- 2017–2019: Selfoss
- 2019–2020: Skjern Håndbold
- 2011–2019: Austria
- 2020-2023: Stjarnan

Patrekur Jóhannesson (born 7 July 1972) is an Icelandic former handball player, who played for the Icelandic national handball team and competed in the 1992 Summer Olympics.

After he stopped playing handball professionally he embarked on a coaching career. In November 2011 Patrekur was appointed head coach for the Austrian national handball team.

== Family ==
Patrekur is son of the teacher and journalist Margrét Thorlacius and the PE teacher and coach Jóhannes Sæmundsson. His father died of cancer at the age of 42. He is the brother of the historian and former President of Iceland Guðni Th. Jóhannesson, and of Jóhannes, who is a system analyst. His son is a popular rapper in Iceland, called JóiPé.
