= Stefan Lövgren =

Swedish handball player (born 1970)

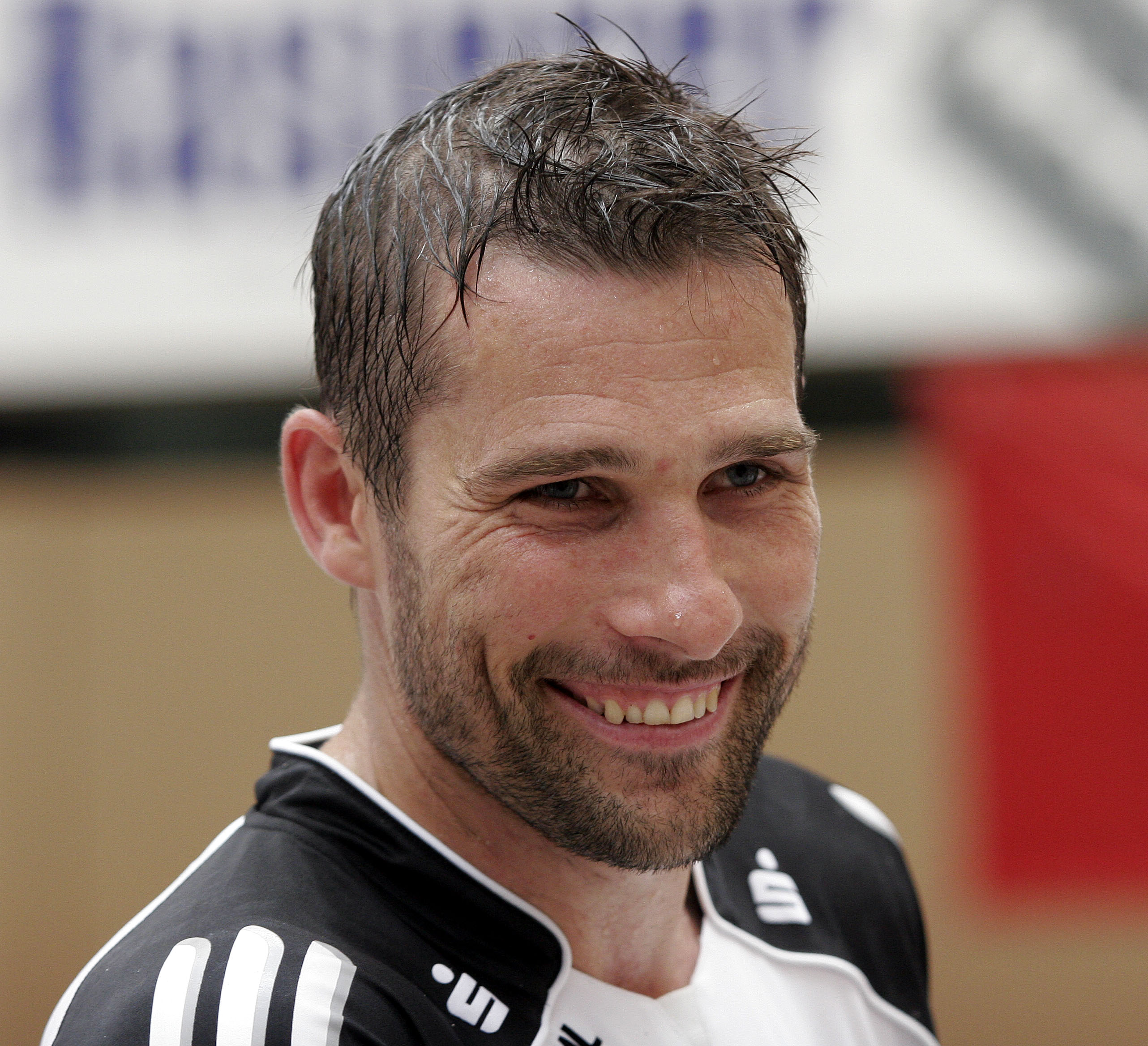
- Stefan Lövgren during the Schlecker Cup in August 2007

Personal information
- Full name: Lars Stefan Lövgren
- Born: 21 December 1970 (age 55) Partille, Sweden
- Height: 1.92 m (6 ft 3 1/2 in)

Sport
- Sport: Handball
- Position: Centre back

Youth career
- Years: Team
- –: Skepplanda BTK

Senior clubs
- Years: Team
- 1990–1998: Redbergslids IK
- 1998–1999: TV Niederwürzbach
- 1999–2009: THW Kiel
National team
| Years | Team | Apps | (Gls) |
| 1993–2006 | Sweden | 268 | (1138) |
Medal record
Men's handball
Representing Sweden
Olympic Games
| Silver medal – second place | 1996 Atlanta | Team Competition |
| Silver medal – second place | 2000 Sydney | Team Competition |
World Championships
| Gold medal – first place | 1999 Egypt | Team competition |
| Silver medal – second place | 1997 Japan | Team competition |
| Silver medal – second place | 2001 France | Team competition |
| Bronze medal – third place | 1995 Iceland | Team competition |
European Championships
| Gold medal – first place | 1994 Portugal | Team competition |
| Gold medal – first place | 1998 Italy | Team competition |
| Gold medal – first place | 2000 Croatia | Team competition |
| Gold medal – first place | 2002 Sweden | Team competition |

Lars Stefan Lövgren (born 21 December 1970) is a Swedish former handball player. He was born in Gothenburg. Making his debut in the national team in 1993, he played a total of 268 games and scored 1138 goals.

He was included in the European Handball Federation Hall of Fame in 2023. He was named Swedish Handballer of the Year three times; in 1996, 2001 and 2004.

== Career ==
During his adult career he played for Redbergslids IK (in Gothenburg), and German sides TV Niederwürzbach and Champions League- and Bundesliga-winning team THW Kiel. He was the captain of the national team during the period 1996–2006 and for THW Kiel 2001–2009. He is a five-time Swedish league champion with Redbergslid, and a seven-time Bundesliga champion with THW. He won the German cup four times, and he helped lead Kiel to the European Champions League title in 2007 (being a finalist in 2000, 2008 and 2009).

Lövgren was World Champion in 1999 with the national team and is one of the few players to have participated in all the gold medal-winning Swedish sides in the European Championships (1994, 1998, 2000, 2002). As an individual player, he was named Most Valuable Player in both the 1999 and 2001 World Championships, was top scorer in the Olympic Games in 2000 and provided the most assists during the 2005 World Men's Handball Championship in what proved to be his final major tournament. He is a former member of the IHF Athletes Commission, and is one of the most respected players in team handball (with, among others, Nikola Karabatić citing him as a role model both as a person, player and captain).

Lövgren is a two-time Olympic silver medalist. In the 1996 Atlanta games, the Swedish team won the silver medal with Lövgren playing all seven matches and scoring a total of 17 goals. Four years later in Sydney Sweden again won silver. Lövgren played all eight matches and scored 51 goals.

In January 2010, Lövgren returned to the US to play in the Big Apple Team Handball Tournament where he competed with a group of European all-stars against the reigning US club champions, New York City THC. Lövgren and the all-stars won 39-27.

Lövgren lives in Kungälv outside Gothenburg with his wife and their two children.

== World championships ==
- 1995 – bronze
- 1997 – silver
- 1999 – gold
- 2001 – silver

== European Championships ==
- 1994 – gold
- 1998 – gold
- 2000 – gold
- 2002 – gold

== Olympic Games ==
- 1996 – silver
- 2000 – silver

== See also ==
- List of men's handballers with 1000 or more international goals
