= Idrottens Hus (Helsingborg) =

Arena in Helsingborg, Skåne County, Sweden

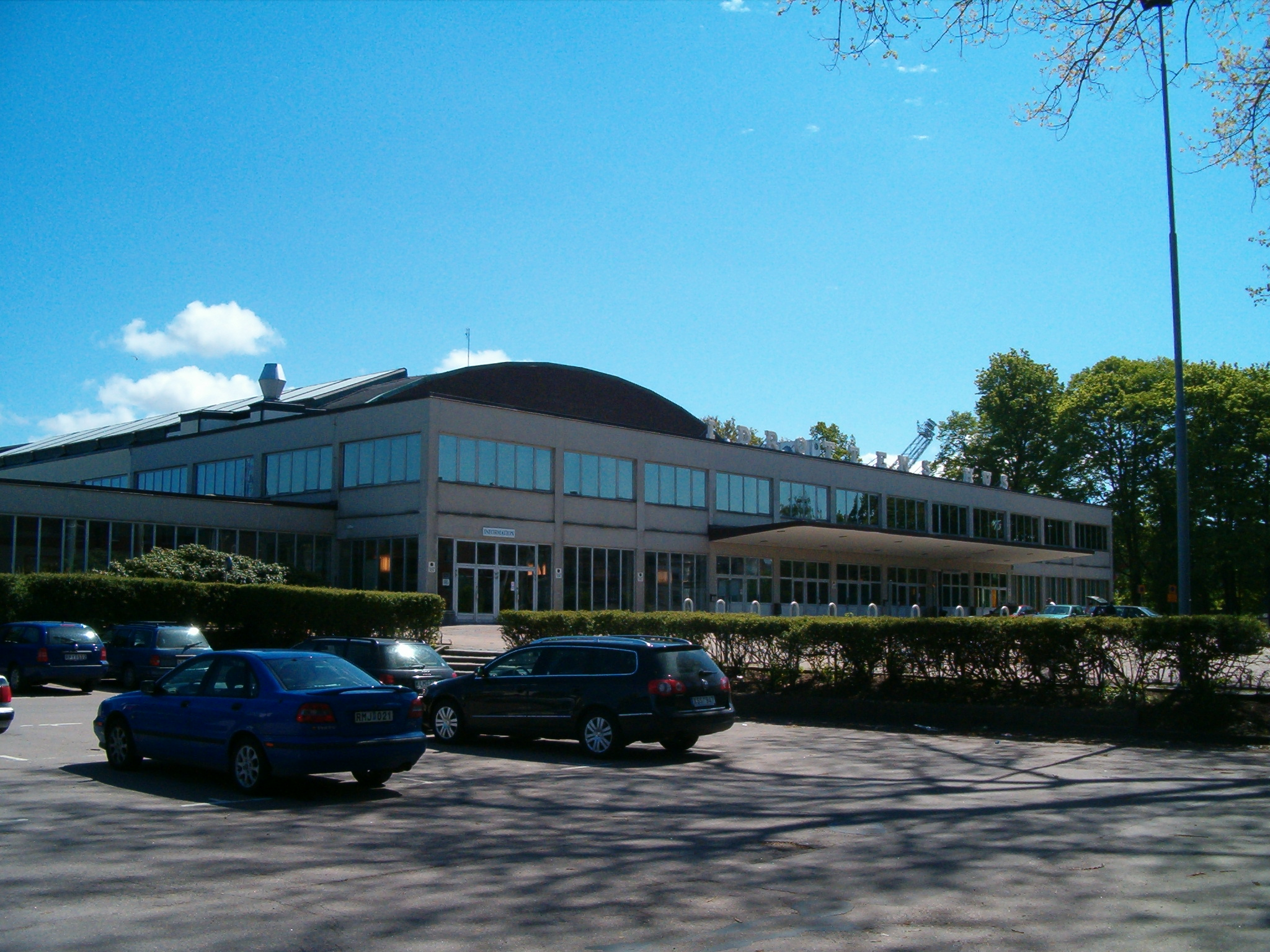
- Interactive map of Idrottens Hus
- Location: Helsingborg, Sweden
- Coordinates: 56°3′4.4″N 12°42′21.6″E
- Capacity: 2,400 (tennis)

Construction
- Opened: 24 August 1957

Tenants
- Davis Cup (Sweden vs Romania) (Sep 2009, Play-offs); Davis Cup (Sweden vs Brazil) (Feb 2003); Davis Cup (Sweden vs Czech Republic) (Feb 2001)

Idrottens Hus is an arena venue in Helsingborg, Sweden. The stadium was built in 1957.

== See also ==
- List of tennis stadiums by capacity
