= Ľubomír Švajlen =

Slovak handball player (born 1964)

Personal information
- Nationality: Slovak
- Born: 17 February 1965 (age 61) Košice, Czechoslovakia
- Height: 195 cm (77 in)

Sport
- Sport: Handball
- Position: Goalkeeper

Senior clubs
- Years: Team
- –1992: SKP Bratislava
- 1992–1998: Fotex KC Veszprém
- 1998–2001: Grasshopper Club Zurich
- 2001–2006: HC Gelb-Schwarz Stäfa
- 2006–2009: GC Amicitia Zürich
National team
Years	Team	Apps
–	Czechoslovakia	149
–	Slovakia	26

Teams managed
- –2006: Kadetten Schaffhausen (GK coach)
- 2006–2011: GC Amicitia Zürich (Assistant coach)
- 2008–2013: Switzerland (Assistant coach)
- 2013–: HC Kriens-Luzern (GK coach)

Ľubomír Švajlen (born 17 February 1964 in Košice) is a Slovak former handball player and current coach. He competed in the 1988 and 1992 Summer Olympics, representing Czechoslovakia. He was named Slovak handballer of the year three times, in 1990, 1993 and 1994.

After his playing career he became the goalkeeping coach at GC Amicitia Zürich. From 2008 to 2013 he was the assistant coach on the Swiss national team under Goran Perkovac. From 2013 he has been the goalkeeping coach at HC Kriens-Luzern.

== Private ==
His son Michal Svajlen is also a handball goalkeeper who represented Switzerland internationally.
