= Cadet Corps =

Kind of military school for boys

A corps of cadets, also called cadet corps, is a type of military school (such as a JROTC high school, senior military college or service academy) or unit that is part of an extracurricular program (such as ROTC) intended to prepare cadets for a military life. The school or program typically incorporates real military structure and ranks within their respective program.

== History ==
=== Origins ===
Initially, such schools admitted only sons of the nobility or gentry, but in time many of the schools were opened also to members of other social classes. Since the 19th century, "corps of cadets" has referred to the student body of cadets at a military academy.

The original Cadets de Gascogne corps was established in France by King Louis XIII for younger sons of Gascon gentry (in the Gascon language, capdets—"little chiefs"). This idea of a school for boys who would later become gentlemen volunteers in the army to offset their lack of patrimony, soon spread, with similar schools being established in other European countries.

=== Expansion ===
==== Germanic countries ====
Notable cadet-corps schools were created by the "Great Elector" Frederick William I of Brandenburg, in Kolberg, Berlin, and Magdeburg. In 1716 the 1st Kolberg corps of about seventy cadets was relocated to the Royal Prussian Cadet Corps in Berlin. Based at the newly erected Kadettenhaus, it became the main education centre of Prussian Army officers under "Soldier King" Frederick William I. Further cadet schools were established in Stolp (1769), Kulm (1776), Potsdam, and Kalisch (1793). The educational system was largely reorganised by officers like Ernst von Rüchel, Gerhard von Scharnhorst, August Neidhardt von Gneisenau, and Hermann von Boyen in the course of the 19th century Prussian Reforms. In 1878 the Hauptkadettenanstalt moved to Lichterfelde in the southwestern suburbs of Berlin.

The aristocratic Ritter-Akademie (knight academy) in Liegnitz, Silesia, established in 1708, had a similar concept. Based on the Prussian model, cadet schools were founded by the Saxon Army in 1725 at Dresden and by the Bavarian Army at Munich in 1755. A Württemberg military college (Kriegsschule) was founded in 1820 at Ludwigsburg. In the Austrian Empire, Cadeten-Institute were established in Hainburg, Eisenstadt, Marburg, and Rijeka, where officer candidates prepared for military academy attendance.

==== Russia ====
A first Russian Cadet Corps was created by Empress Anna at Saint Petersburg in 1731.

==== Poland-Lithuania ====
The Corps of Cadets was established at Warsaw for Lithuanian and Polish nobles in 1765 by King Stanisław August Poniatowski.

==== Japan ====
Similar institutions comprise the Imperial Japanese Army Academy established in 1868.

==== United States ====
In the United States there are several types of institutions which have a cadet corps these include:

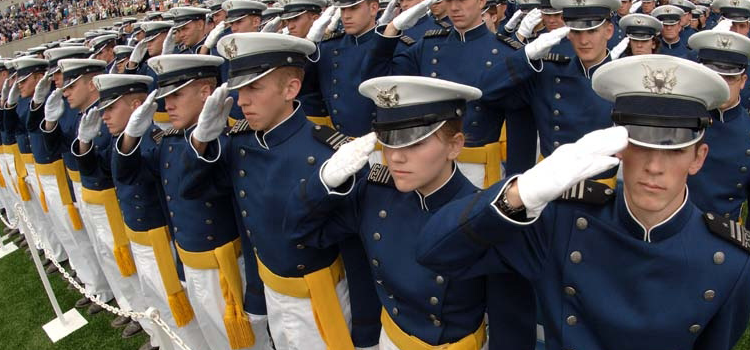
US Air Force Academy cadets

Federal Service Academies
The colleges operated by the US Federal Government, referred to as federal service academies, are:

- United States Air Force Academy
- United States Coast Guard Academy
- United States Merchant Marine Academy
- United States Military Academy
- United States Naval Academy

Students at these schools do not pay tuition, but must fulfill a mandatory service requirements after graduation.

Cadets marching at Virginia Military Institute (VMI)

Senior Military Colleges
Six colleges that offer military Reserve Officers' Training Corps (ROTC) programs under 10 U.S.C. § 2111a(f), though many other schools offer military Reserve Officers' Training Corps under other sections of the law.

- Virginia Military Institute

In addition, these five institutions that were military colleges at the time of their founding now maintain both a corps of cadets and a civilian student body. Many of these institutions also offer online degree programs:

- Norwich University
- South Carolina Corps of Cadets at The Citadel
- Texas A&M Corps of Cadets at Texas A&M University
- University of North Georgia
- Virginia Tech Corps of Cadets at Virginia Tech

Maritime Institutes
Maritime Institutes operate on a military college system. Cadets may apply for Naval Reserve commissions upon obtaining their Merchant Marine Officer's licenses and offer some form of military commissioning program into the active duty US Navy, US Marine Corps, or US Coast Guard.

- California State University Maritime Academy
- Great Lakes Maritime Academy (a division of Northwestern Michigan College)
- Maine Maritime Academy
- Massachusetts Maritime Academy
- State University of New York Maritime College (part of the State University of New York (SUNY) system)
- Texas A&M Maritime Academy (part of the Texas A&M University System)

Military Junior Colleges
Military junior colleges participate in the Army's two-year Early Commissioning Program, an Army ROTC program where qualified students can earn a commission as a second lieutenant after only two years of college.

- Georgia Military College
- Marion Military Institute
- New Mexico Military Institute
- Valley Forge Military Academy and College

==== Canada ====
Likewise, Upper Canada College, in Toronto, Ontario, maintained a cadet corps from 1832 to 1976.

==== Australia ====
The Australian Cadet Corps operated from 1951 to 1975.

== Modern cadet corps ==
- Texas A&M University Corps of Cadets
- Cadet Corps, Kazakhstan
- Kronstadt Sea Cadet Corps
- Navy League Cadet Corps (Canada)
- National Cadet Corps (Sri Lanka)
- National Cadet Corps (India)
- National Cadet Corps (Singapore)
- Armed Forces Academies Preparatory School, Thailand

== See also ==
- Kadetten
