= Švajlen =

Švajlen is a Slovak surname. Outside of Slovakia, the form Svajlen can also be found. Notable people with the surname include:

- Anton Švajlen (1937–2026), Slovak football goalkeeper
- Ľubomír Švajlen (born 1964), Slovak handball player and coach
- Michal Svajlen (born 1989), Swiss-Slovak handball player and coach, son of Ľubomír Švajlen
