= Martin Rubin =

Swiss handball player (born 1964)

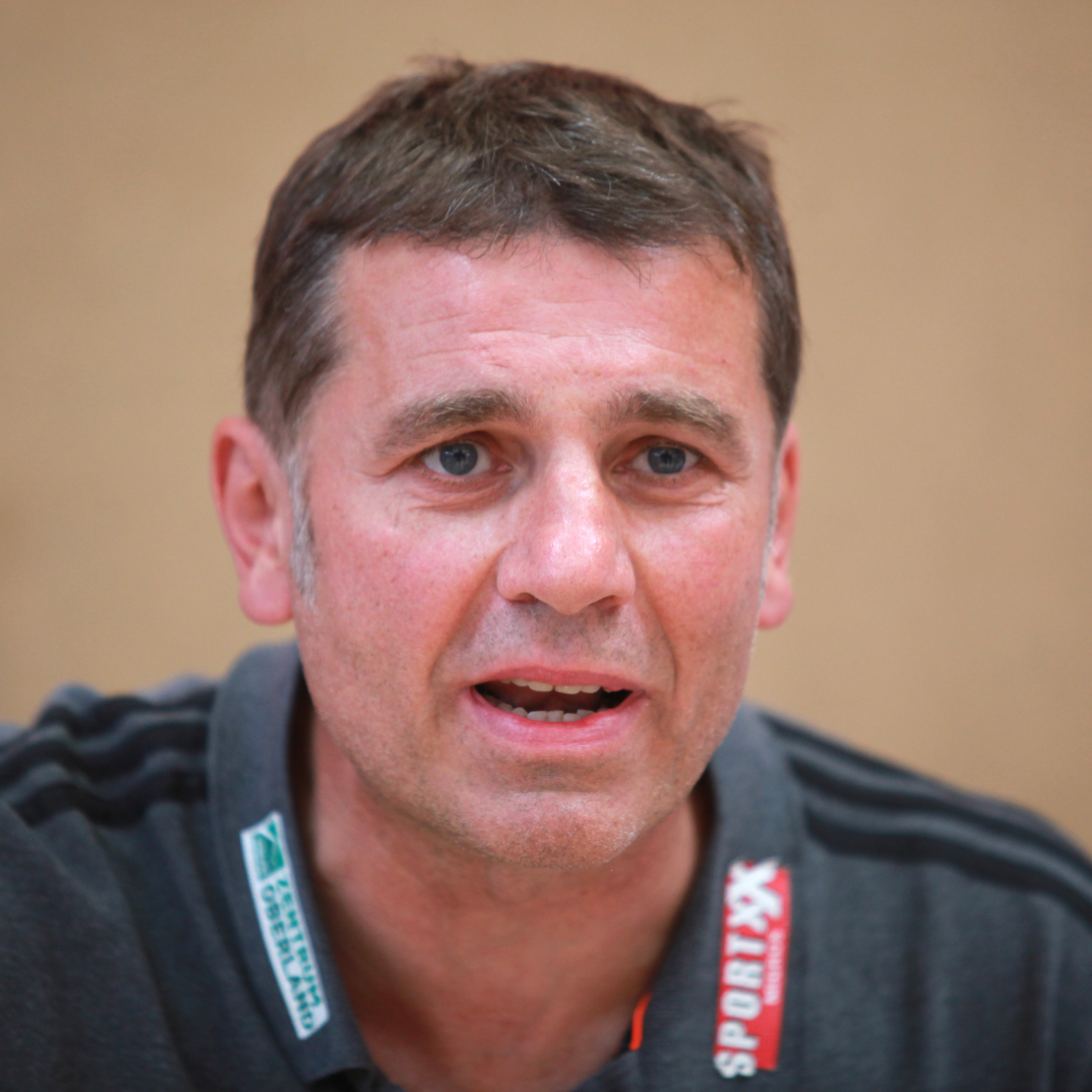
- Martin Rubin in 2013

Personal information
- Nationality: Swiss
- Born: 4 August 1964 (age 62) Bern, Switzerland
- Height: 198 cm (78 in)

Sport
- Sport: Handball
- Position: Right back

Senior clubs
- Years: Team
- 1983 - 1990: BSV Bern
- 1990 - 1995: Wacker Thun
- 1995 - 1998: TSV Bayer Dormagen
- 1998 - 2003: Wacker Thun
- 2007: Wacker Thun
National team
Years	Team	Apps	(Gls)
1983 - ?	Switzerland	239	(828)

Teams managed
- 2001-2003: Wacker Thun (assistent)
- 2003-2007: BSV Bern Muri
- 2007-2021: Wacker Thun
- 2021-2024: BSV Bern Muri

Martin Rubin (born 4 August 1964) is a Swiss former handball player and coach. He competed in the men's tournament at the 1984 Summer Olympics. He has the third most caps for the Switzerland men's national handball team with 239, only behind Peter Hürlimann and Max Schär.

His son, Lenny Rubin, is also a handball player.
