= Nikola Portner =

Swiss handball player (born 1993)

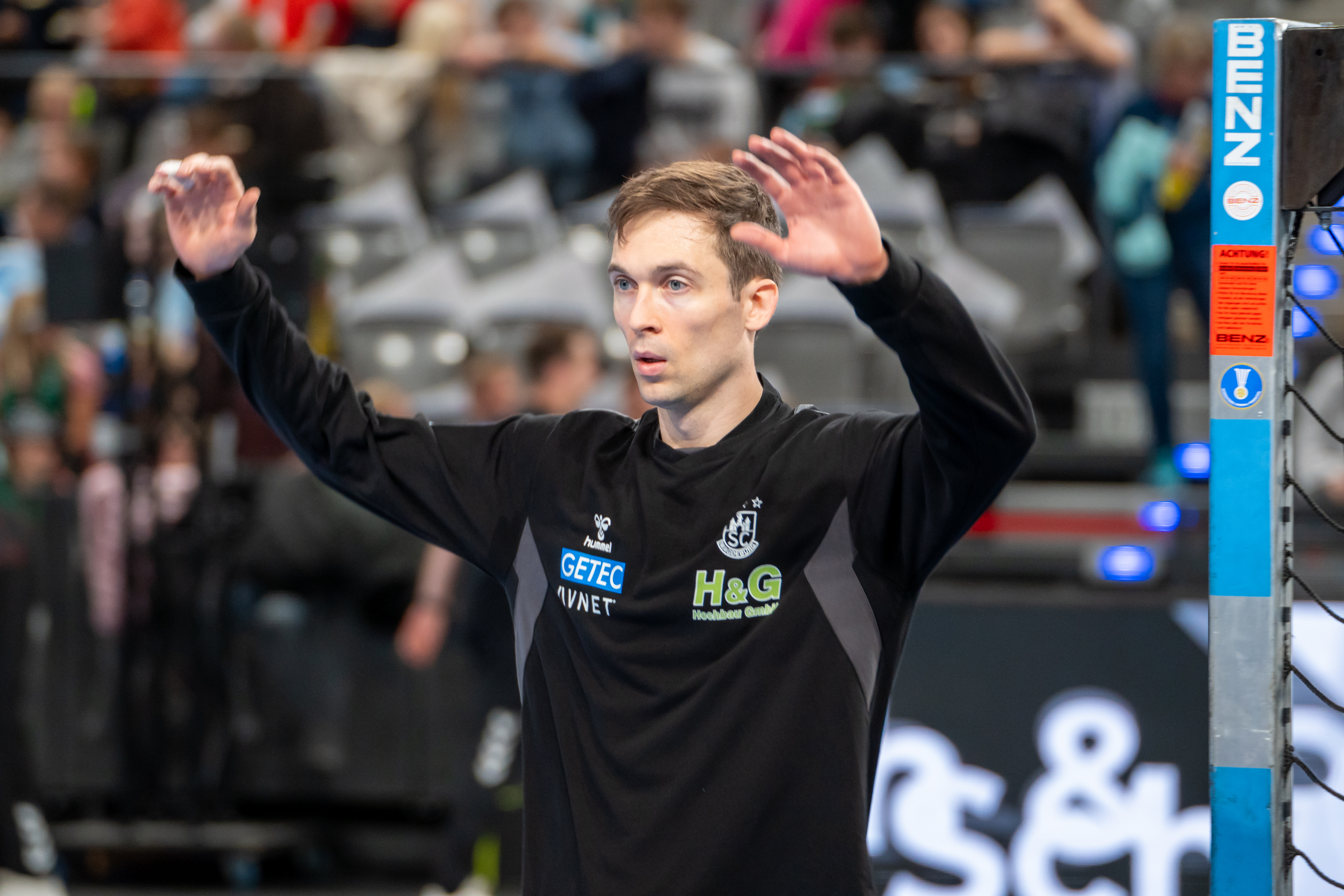

Personal information
- Nationality: Swiss
- Born: 19 November 1993 (age 32) Lyon, France
- Height: 1.94 m (6 ft 4 in)

Sport
- Sport: Handball
- Position: Goalkeeper
- Current club: SC Magdeburg
- Number: 80

Youth career
- Years: Team
- 2004–2006: BSC Grosshöchstetten
- 2006–2007: Handball Grauholz
- 2007–2009: TV Steffisburg

Senior clubs
- Years: Team
- 2009–2010: Handball Grauholz
- 2010–2014: BSV Bern Muri
- 2014–2016: Kadetten Schaffhausen
- 2016–2020: Montpellier Handball
- 2020–2022: Chambéry SMB HB
- 2022–2026: SC Magdeburg
- 2026—: SC Pick Szeged
National team
Years	Team	Apps	(Gls)
2011–	Switzerland	148	(33)
- Updated on 14 January 2026

Nikola Portner (born 19 November 1993) is a Swiss handball player for SC Magdeburg and the Swiss national team.

== Private ==
Nikola Portner is the son of the Serbian international handballer Zlatko Portner. At the age of three he moved to Bern when his father signed for BSV Bern. He achieved Swiss citizenship in 2008; at the same time as his father.

== Career ==
Aged 11 he joined the Swiss team BSC Grosshöchstetten. He made his senior debut in the National Liga B for Handball Grauholz, where his father was a coach. From 2010 he joined BSV Bern Muri in the top league. In the 2011-12 season he was named Rookie of the season at the Swiss Handball Award.

In 2014 he joined Kadetten Schaffhausen. Here he won the Swiss Championship in 2015 and 2016 and the Swiss Cup in 2016.

In 2016 he joined French team Montpellier AHB. Here he won the EHF Champions League in 2018.

For the 2017-18 season he joined league rivals Chambéry Savoie HB. In the 2021-22 he was named best goalkeeper of the season in the French league.

In 2022 he joined German side SC Magdeburg. Here he won the 2022 IHF Men's Super Globe and the 2022-23 EHF Champions League, beating Polish KS Kielce in the final 30:29. The following sesason he won the 2023 IHF Men's Super Globe for a second time. In the 2024-25 season he won the EHF Champions League for a third time, beating Füchse Berlin in the final.

In April 2024 while playing for Magdeburg, Portner was tested positive for Methamphetamine prior to league match against Füchse Berlin. He denied allegations of deliberate doping, and in June it was ruled that there was not a high enough level of the drug that deliberate use was likely, and he was acquitted of all charges and only had to serve a 21 month ban. He returned to training on 10 October 2025 and to paying on 10 December 2025. He made his return to handball for the Swiss national team at the 2026 European Men's Handball Championship.

== National team ==
Portner made his debut for the Swiss national team on 2 November 2nd 2011 against Italy.

He represented Switzerland at the 2020 European Men's Handball Championship.

At the 2021 World Men's Handball Championship he finished 16th with the Swiss team.

Ahead of the 2024 European Men's Handball Championship he was named captain of the Swiss national team. At the fournamant Switzerland finisheed 21st.

At the 2025 World Men's Handball Championship he finished 11th with the Swiss team.
