= Switzerland men's national handball team =

Switzerland

Information
- Association: Swiss Handball Association
- Coach: Andy Schmid
- Assistant coach: Fabian Böhm; Miloš Čučković; Thomas Zimmermann
- Most caps: Max Schär (279)
- Most goals: Marc Baumgartner (1093)

Colours
1st	2nd

Results

Summer Olympics
- Appearances: 4 (First in 1936)
- Best result: (bronze) 3rd (1936)

World Championship
- Appearances: 12 (First in 1954)
- Best result: 4th (1954, 1993)

European Championship
- Appearances: 6 (First in 2002)
- Best result: 12th (2004, 2026)
- Last updated on Unknown.

Switzerland men's national handball team
Medal record

Olympic Games
Bronze medal – third place	1936 Berlin	Team

World Outdoor Championship
Silver medal – second place	1938 Germany	
Silver medal – second place	1955 West Germany	
Bronze medal – third place	1948 France	
Bronze medal – third place	1952 Switzerland	
Bronze medal – third place	1963 Switzerland	

The Switzerland national handball team is the national handball team of Switzerland.

== Competitive record ==
=== Olympic Games ===
Olympic record
Games	Round	Position	Pld	W	D	L	GF	GA
(Germany) 1936 Berlin (Note: The Handball tournament at the 1936 Summer Olympics was a Field handball tournament.)	Third place	3rd of 6	5	2	0	3	33	52
Not held from 1948 to 1968
(West Germany) 1972 Munich	did not qualify							
(Canada) 1976 Montreal	did not qualify							
(Soviet Union) 1980 Moscow	Match for 7th place	8th of 12	6	2	0	4	132	121
(United States) 1984 Los Angeles	Match for 7th place	7th of 12	6	3	0	3	101	119
(South Korea) 1988 Seoul	did not qualify							
(Spain) 1992 Barcelona	did not qualify							
(United States) 1996 Atlanta	Match for 7th place	8th of 12	6	2	0	4	142	138
(Australia) 2000 Sydney	did not qualify							
(Greece) 2004 Athens	did not qualify							
(China) 2008 Beijing	did not qualify							
(United Kingdom) 2012 London	did not qualify							
(Brazil) 2016 Rio de Janeiro	did not qualify							
(Japan) 2020 Tokyo	did not qualify							
(France) 2024 Paris	did not qualify							
(United States) 2028 Los Angeles	To be determined							
(Australia) 2032 Brisbane	To be determined							
Total	4/16	–	23	9	0	14	408	430

=== World Championship ===
World Championship record
Year	Round	Position	GP	W	D	L	GS	GA
(Nazi Germany) 1938	did not qualify							
(Sweden) 1954	Fourth place	4	3	0	1	2	31	55
(East Germany) 1958	did not qualify							
(West Germany) 1961	Preliminary round	10	2	0	0	2	25	32
(Czechoslovakia) 1964	Preliminary round	12	3	1	0	2	38	56
(Sweden) 1967	Preliminary round	14	3	0	0	3	45	65
(France) 1970	Preliminary round	15	3	0	0	3	29	48
(East Germany) 1974	did not qualify							
(Denmark) 1978	did not qualify							
(West Germany) 1982	Second round	12	7	1	2	4	111	128
(Switzerland) 1986	Second round	11	7	2	1	4	127	146
(Czechoslovakia) 1990	Main Round	13	6	4	0	2	122	113
(Sweden) 1993	Fourth place	4	7	4	0	3	162	160
(Iceland) 1995	Quarter-finals	7	9	7	0	2	224	203
(Japan) 1997	did not qualify							
(Egypt) 1999	did not qualify							
(France) 2001	did not qualify							
(Portugal) 2003	did not qualify							
(Tunisia) 2005	did not qualify							
(Germany) 2007	did not qualify							
(Croatia) 2009	did not qualify							
(Sweden) 2011	did not qualify							
(Spain) 2013	did not qualify							
(Qatar) 2015	did not qualify							
(France) 2017	did not qualify							
(Denmark) / (Germany) 2019	did not qualify							
(Egypt) 2021	Main Round	16	6	3	0	3	153	156
(Poland) / (Sweden) 2023	did not qualify							
(Croatia) / (Denmark) / (Norway) 2025	Main Round	11	6	3	1	2	174	166
(Germany) 2027	did not qualify							
(France) / (Germany) 2029	TBD							
(Denmark) / (Iceland) / (Norway) 2031	TBD							
Total	12/32	–	62	25	5	32	1241	1328

=== World Outdoor Championship ===
World Outdoor Championship record
Year	Round	Position	GP	W	D	L	GS	GA
(Nazi Germany) 1938	Runners-up	2nd of 10	3	2	0	1	14	27
(France) 1948	Third place	3rd of 4	3	2	0	1	37	22
(Switzerland) 1952	Third place	3rd of 15	5	4	0	1	58	41
(West Germany) 1955	Runners-up	2nd of 8	6	5	0	1	75	59
(Austria) 1959	Match for 5th place	5 of 7	4	2	0	2	50	43
(Switzerland) 1963	Third place	3rd of 8	4	3	0	1	62	44
(Austria) 1966	Main round	5 of 6	5	1	0	4	68	76
Total	7/7	–	30	19	0	11	364	312

Switzerland is the only country which played at every Field Handball World Championship.

=== Euro Tournaments ===
All teams in these tournaments are European, all World and Olympic Champions, and top 7 from World Championships and Olympics were participating. They were mini European championships at the time, till 1994 when official European Championship started.

EURO World Cup tournament Sweden

- None (Sweden)

EURO Super Cup tournament Germany

- 1993 (Germany) : 3rd place

=== European Championship ===
European Championship record
Year	Round	Position	GP	W	D	L	GS	GA
(Portugal) 1994	did not qualify							
(Spain) 1996	did not qualify							
(Italy) 1998	did not qualify							
(Croatia) 2000	did not qualify							
(Sweden) 2002	Preliminary round	13	3	0	1	2	78	91
(Slovenia) 2004	Preliminary round	12	6	1	0	5	140	175
(Switzerland) 2006	Preliminary round	14	3	0	1	2	86	97
(Norway) 2008	did not qualify							
(Austria) 2010	did not qualify							
(Serbia) 2012	did not qualify							
(Denmark) 2014	did not qualify							
(Poland) 2016	did not qualify							
(Croatia) 2018	did not qualify							
(Austria) (Norway) (Sweden) 2020	Preliminary round	16	3	1	0	2	77	87
(Hungary) (Slovakia) 2022	did not qualify							
(Germany) 2024	Preliminary round	21	3	0	1	2	67	82
(Denmark) (Norway) (Sweden) 2026	Main round	12	7	1	3	3	218	221
(Portugal) (Spain) (Switzerland) 2028	Qualified as co-host							
(Czech Republic) (Denmark) (Poland) 2030	To be determined							
(France) (Germany) 2032	To be determined							
Total	7/20	–	25	3	6	16	666	753

== Team ==
=== Current squad ===
Roster for the 2026 European Men's Handball Championship.

Head coach: Andy Schmid

No.	Pos.	Name	Date of birth (age)	Height	App.	Goals	Club
3	P	Lucas Meister	16 August 1996 (age 29)	1.96 m	100	230	(Switzerland) Kadetten Schaffhausen
4	LB	Lenny Rubin	1 February 1996 (age 30)	2.05 m	92	350	(Germany) TVB Stuttgart
8	LB	Manuel Zehnder	24 October 1999 (age 26)	1.90 m	30	140	(Germany) SC Magdeburg
11	CB	Felix Aellen	11 October 2003 (age 22)	1.87 m	29	68	(Germany) ThSV Eisenach
13	RB	Michael Kusio	31 August 1998 (age 27)	1.95 m	29	16	(Switzerland) BSV Bern
16	GK	Nikola Portner	19 November 1993 (age 32)	1.94 m	148	33	(Germany) SC Magdeburg
17	P	Samuel Röthlisberger	15 August 1996 (age 29)	1.99 m	98	24	(Germany) TVB 1898 Stuttgart
18	RB	Dimitrij Küttel	18 February 1994 (age 32)	1.91 m	98	187	(Switzerland) Kadetten Schaffhausen
20	LB	Luka Maros	20 March 1994 (age 32)	1.96 m	89	221	(Switzerland) Kadetten Schaffhausen
21	RW	Gino Steenaerts	5 May 2005 (age 21)	1.84 m	22	68	(Germany) Rhein-Neckar Löwen
23	P	Lukas Laube	22 April 2000 (age 26)	1.92 m	44	94	(Germany) THW Kiel
25	RW	Levin Wanner	18 August 2000 (age 25)	1.83 m	11	10	(Switzerland) BSV Bern
28	CB	Luca Sigrist	4 October 2005 (age 20)	1.86 m	19	42	(Switzerland) HC Kriens-Luzern
29	LW	Samuel Zehnder	29 February 2000 (age 26)	1.83 m	69	148	(Germany) TBV Lemgo
30	P	Joël Willecke	23 November 2003 (age 22)	2.02 m	39	10	(Germany) TBV Lemgo
35	LW	Noam Leopold	17 July 2002 (age 23)	1.86 m	25	73	(France) HBC Nantes
38	GK	Jannis Scheidiger	8 August 2002 (age 23)	1.93 m	22	2	(Switzerland) HC Kriens-Luzern
40	GK	Mathieu Seravalli	15 September 2004 (age 21)	1.98 m	10	0	(Switzerland) BSV Bern
44	LB	Mehdi Ben Romdhane	2 December 2001 (age 24)	1.89 m	44	60	(Switzerland) Kadetten Schaffhausen

=== Player statistics ===
Most capped players
#	Player	Games	Goals	Position
1	Max Schär	279	724	OB
2	Peter Hürlimann	241	0	GK
3	Martin Rubin	239	878	OB
4	Andy Schmid	218	1094	CB
5	Manuel Liniger	214	891	LW
6	Hans Huber	211	413	?
7	René Barth	206	251	?
8	Stefan Schärer	204	533	?
9	Iwan Ursic	195	571	P
10	Robert Jehle	190	572	?

Top scorers
#	Player	Goals	Average	Position
1	Andy Schmid	1094	4,92	CB
2	Marc Baumgartner	1093	6,47	LB
3	Manuel Liniger	891	4,24	LW
4	Martin Rubin	878	3,67	OB
5	Robert Kostadinovich	771	4,26	?
6	Ernst Züllig	748	4,25	?
7	Max Schär	724	2,59	OB
8	Robert Jehle	572	3,01	?
9	Iwan Ursic	571	2,93	P
10	Stefan Schärer	533	2,61	?
