= Marvin Lier =

Swiss handball player

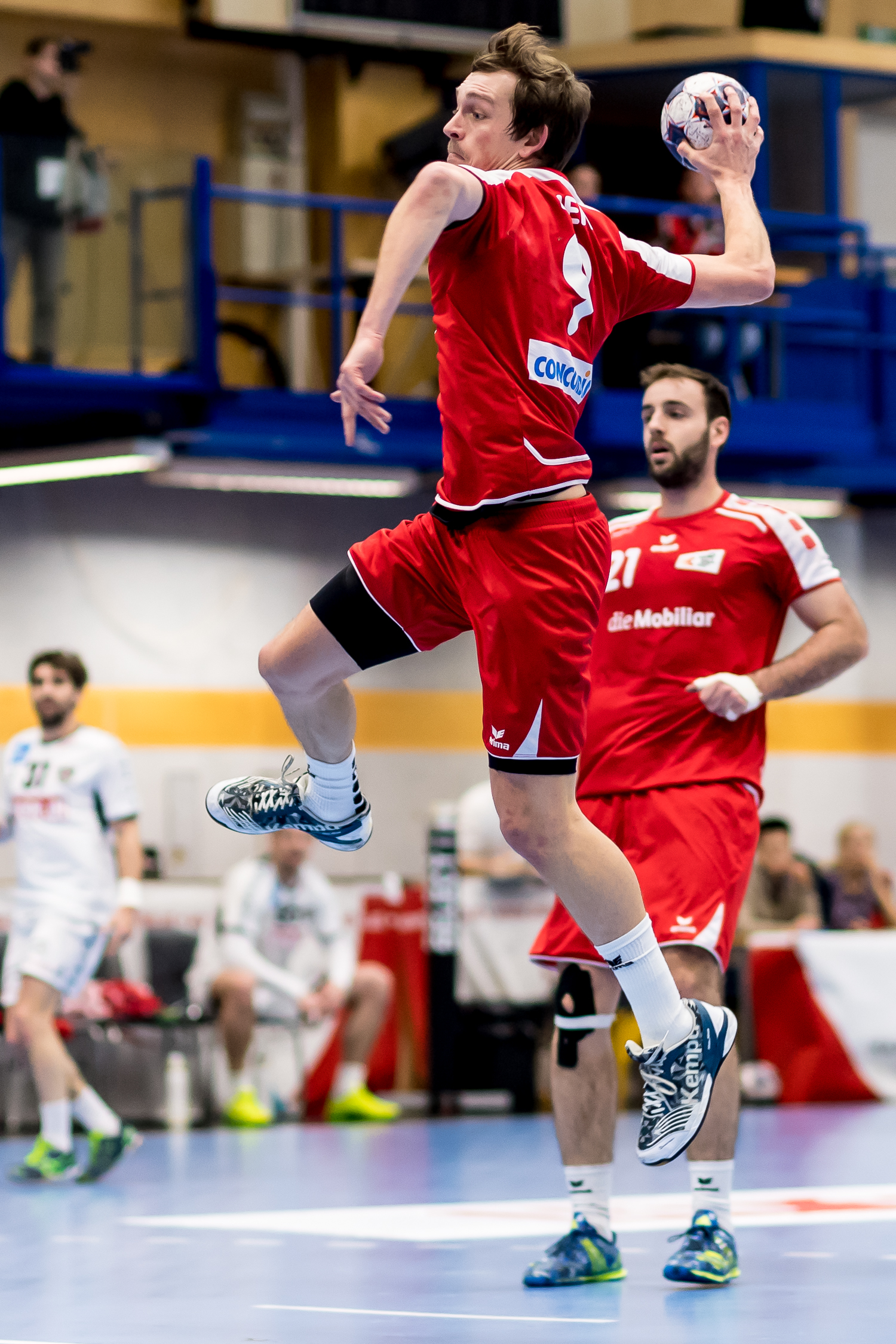
- Lier in 2017

Personal information
- Nationality: Swiss
- Born: 8 September 1992 (age 34) Zürich, Switzerland
- Height: 1.85 m (6 ft 1 in)

Sport
- Sport: Handball
- Position: Left wing
- Current club: Kadetten Schaffhausen
- Number: 15

Youth career
- Years: Team
- –2007: HC Ehrendingen
- 2007–2008: TV Endingen

Senior clubs
- Years: Team
- 2008–2012: TV Endingen
- 2012–2019: Pfadi Winterthur
- 2019–2020: SG Flensburg-Handewitt
- 2020–2021: Pfadi Winterthur
- 2021–: Kadetten Schaffhausen
National team
Years	Team	Apps	(Gls)
2013–	Switzerland	105	(250)
- Updated on 27 January 2024

Marvin Lier (born 8 September 1992) is a Swiss handball player for Kadetten Schaffhausen and the Swiss national team.

He represented Switzerland at the 2020 European Men's Handball Championship. At the 2024 European Men's Handball Championship he finished 21st with Switzerland.
