= 2004 European Men's Handball Championship =

2004 edition of the European Men's Handball Championship

Evropsko prvenstvo v rokometu 2004

Tournament details
- Host country: Slovenia
- Venues: 4 (in 4 host cities)
- Dates: 22 January – 1 February
- Teams: 16 (from 1 confederation)

Final positions
- Champions: Germany (1st title)
- Runners-up: Slovenia
- Third place: Denmark
- Fourth place: Croatia

Tournament statistics
- Matches played: 48
- Goals scored: 2,733 (56.94 per match)
- Attendance: 149,984 (3,125 per match)
- Top scorers: (Croatia) Mirza Džomba (46 goals)

Awards
- Best player: (Croatia) Ivano Balić

The 2004 Men's European Handball Championship was the sixth edition of the tournament and took place from 22 January to 1 February 2004 in Slovenia in the cities of Ljubljana, Celje, Velenje and Koper.

Germany won the title after defeating hosts Slovenia in the final. Denmark captured the bronze medal, after defeating Croatia.

== Venues ==
Location	Picture	City	Arena	Capacity	Status	Round
Ljubljana is located in Slovenia		Ljubljana	Tivoli Hall	5,600	Opened in 1965	Preliminary stage & Second Group stage and knockout stages
Koper is located in Slovenia		Koper	Arena Bonifika	5,000	Opened in 1999	Preliminary stage
Velenje is located in Slovenia		Velenje	Red Hall	2,500	Opened in 1975	Preliminary stage
Celje is located in Slovenia		Celje	Zlatorog Arena	5,500	Opened in 2003	Preliminary stage and second group stage

== Qualification ==
Country	Qualified as	Previous appearances in tournament^{1}
Slovenia	Host	4 (1994, 1996, 2000, 2002)
Denmark	Semifinalist of 2002 European Championship	4 (1994, 1996, 2000, 2002)
Germany	Semifinalist of 2002 European Championship	5 (1994, 1996, 1998, 2000, 2002)
Iceland	Semifinalist of 2002 European Championship	2 (2000, 2002)
Sweden	Semifinalist of 2002 European Championship	5 (**1994**, 1996, **1998**, **2000**, **2002**)
Russia	Fifth place of 2002 European Championship	5 (1994, **1996**, 1998, 2000, 2002)
Croatia	Playoff winner	5 (1994, 1996, 1998, 2000, 2002)
Czech Republic	Playoff winner	3 (1996, 1998, 2002)
France	Playoff winner	5 (1994, 1996, 1998, 2000, 2002)
Hungary	Playoff winner	3 (1994, 1996, 1998)
Poland	Playoff winner	1 (2002)
Portugal	Playoff winner	3 (1994, 2000, 2002)
Serbia and Montenegro	Playoff winner	3^{2} (1996, 1998, 2002)
Spain	Playoff winner	5 (1994, 1996, 1998, 2000, 2002)
Switzerland	Playoff winner	1 (2002)
Ukraine	Playoff winner	2 (2000, 2002)

^{1} Bold indicates champion for that year. Italic indicates host for that year.
^{2} as FR Yugoslavia

== Preliminary round ==
All times are local (UTC+1).

=== Group A ===
Pos	Team	Pld	W	D	L	GF	GA	GD	Pts	Qualification
1	Russia	3	3	0	0	87	74	+13	6	Main round
2	Sweden	3	2	0	1	93	79	+14	4	Main round
3	Switzerland	3	1	0	2	69	85	−16	2	Main round
4	Ukraine	3	0	0	3	74	85	−11	0	

Source: EHF
Rules for classification: 1) points; 2) head-to-head points; 3) head-to-head goal difference; 4) head-to-head number of goals scored; 5) goal difference.

22 January 2004; 18:00	Russia	28–20	Switzerland	Red Hall, Velenje; Attendance: 2,500; Referees: Boye, Jensen (DEN)
22 January 2004; 18:00	three players 6	(17–10)	Kostadinovich 5	Red Hall, Velenje; Attendance: 2,500; Referees: Boye, Jensen (DEN)
22 January 2004; 18:00	3× (yellow card) 5× (suspension)	Report	3× (yellow card) 6× (suspension)	Red Hall, Velenje; Attendance: 2,500; Referees: Boye, Jensen (DEN)

22 January 2004; 20:30	Sweden	31–25	Ukraine	Red Hall, Velenje; Attendance: 2,500; Referees: Repenšek, Požežnik (SLO)
22 January 2004; 20:30	Petersson 9	(14–13)	Petrenko 9	Red Hall, Velenje; Attendance: 2,500; Referees: Repenšek, Požežnik (SLO)
22 January 2004; 20:30	3× (yellow card) 3× (suspension)	Report	3× (yellow card) 5× (suspension) 1× (red card)	Red Hall, Velenje; Attendance: 2,500; Referees: Repenšek, Požežnik (SLO)

24 January 2004; 16:00	Switzerland	24–35	Sweden	Red Hall, Velenje; Attendance: 2,000; Referees: Lemme, Ullrich (GER)
24 January 2004; 16:00	Gautschi 6	(12–17)	Källman 6	Red Hall, Velenje; Attendance: 2,000; Referees: Lemme, Ullrich (GER)
24 January 2004; 16:00	3× (yellow card) 5× (suspension)	Report	3× (yellow card) 4× (suspension)	Red Hall, Velenje; Attendance: 2,000; Referees: Lemme, Ullrich (GER)

24 January 2004; 18:00	Ukraine	27–29	Russia	Red Hall, Velenje; Attendance: 2,000; Referees: Pleșa, Cîrligeanu (ROU)
24 January 2004; 18:00	Kostetskiy 6	(12–17)	Tuchkin 7	Red Hall, Velenje; Attendance: 2,000; Referees: Pleșa, Cîrligeanu (ROU)
24 January 2004; 18:00	3× (yellow card) 6× (suspension)	Report	4× (yellow card) 6× (suspension)	Red Hall, Velenje; Attendance: 2,000; Referees: Pleșa, Cîrligeanu (ROU)

25 January 2004; 16:00	Ukraine	22–25	Switzerland	Red Hall, Velenje; Attendance: 2,000; Referees: Kékes, Kékes (HUN)
25 January 2004; 16:00	Kostetskiy 11	(12–13)	Kostadinovich 11	Red Hall, Velenje; Attendance: 2,000; Referees: Kékes, Kékes (HUN)
25 January 2004; 16:00	3× (yellow card) 7× (suspension) 1× (red card)	Report	3× (yellow card) 5× (suspension)	Red Hall, Velenje; Attendance: 2,000; Referees: Kékes, Kékes (HUN)

25 January 2004; 18:00	Sweden	27–30	Russia	Red Hall, Velenje; Attendance: 2,200; Referees: Nachevski, Nachevski (MKD)
25 January 2004; 18:00	Lövgren 6	(12–16)	Chipurin 7	Red Hall, Velenje; Attendance: 2,200; Referees: Nachevski, Nachevski (MKD)
25 January 2004; 18:00	4× (yellow card) 2× (suspension)	Report	4× (yellow card) 5× (suspension)	Red Hall, Velenje; Attendance: 2,200; Referees: Nachevski, Nachevski (MKD)

=== Group B ===
Pos	Team	Pld	W	D	L	GF	GA	GD	Pts	Qualification
1	Croatia	3	2	1	0	88	86	+2	5	Main round
2	Denmark	3	2	0	1	85	78	+7	4	Main round
3	Spain	3	1	0	2	82	81	+1	2	Main round
4	Portugal	3	0	1	2	91	101	−10	1	

Source: EHF
Rules for classification: 1) points; 2) head-to-head points; 3) head-to-head goal difference; 4) head-to-head number of goals scored; 5) goal difference.

22 January 2004; 18:00	Spain	29–30	Croatia	Tivoli Hall, Ljubljana; Attendance: 4,500; Referees: Lemme, Ullrich (GER)
22 January 2004; 18:00	Belaustegui 11	(17–14)	Metličić 8	Tivoli Hall, Ljubljana; Attendance: 4,500; Referees: Lemme, Ullrich (GER)
22 January 2004; 18:00	3× (yellow card) 6× (suspension)	Report	3× (yellow card) 8× (suspension)	Tivoli Hall, Ljubljana; Attendance: 4,500; Referees: Lemme, Ullrich (GER)

22 January 2004; 20:30	Denmark	36–32	Portugal	Tivoli Hall, Ljubljana; Attendance: 2,000; Referees: Kékes, Kékes (HUN)
22 January 2004; 20:30	Knudsen 9	(20–15)	Coelho 8	Tivoli Hall, Ljubljana; Attendance: 2,000; Referees: Kékes, Kékes (HUN)
22 January 2004; 20:30	2× (yellow card) 4× (suspension)	Report	3× (yellow card) 4× (suspension)	Tivoli Hall, Ljubljana; Attendance: 2,000; Referees: Kékes, Kékes (HUN)

24 January 2004; 18:00	Portugal	27–33	Spain	Tivoli Hall, Ljubljana; Attendance: 4,000; Referees: Hansson, Olsson (SWE)
24 January 2004; 18:00	Resende 8	(12–19)	Romero 11	Tivoli Hall, Ljubljana; Attendance: 4,000; Referees: Hansson, Olsson (SWE)
24 January 2004; 18:00	3× (yellow card) 2× (suspension)	Report	3× (yellow card) 6× (suspension)	Tivoli Hall, Ljubljana; Attendance: 4,000; Referees: Hansson, Olsson (SWE)

24 January 2004; 20:00	Croatia	26–25	Denmark	Tivoli Hall, Ljubljana; Attendance: 7,000; Referees: Vakula, Ljudovik (UKR)
24 January 2004; 20:00	Lacković 7	(14–12)	Stryger 7	Tivoli Hall, Ljubljana; Attendance: 7,000; Referees: Vakula, Ljudovik (UKR)
24 January 2004; 20:00	4× (yellow card) 4× (suspension)	Report	3× (yellow card) 9× (suspension)	Tivoli Hall, Ljubljana; Attendance: 7,000; Referees: Vakula, Ljudovik (UKR)

25 January 2004; 18:00	Portugal	32–32	Croatia	Tivoli Hall, Ljubljana; Attendance: 2,500; Referees: Krstič, Ljubič (SLO)
25 January 2004; 18:00	J. Costa 7	(13–16)	Džomba 10	Tivoli Hall, Ljubljana; Attendance: 2,500; Referees: Krstič, Ljubič (SLO)
25 January 2004; 18:00	4× (yellow card) 5× (suspension)	Report	3× (yellow card) 6× (suspension)	Tivoli Hall, Ljubljana; Attendance: 2,500; Referees: Krstič, Ljubič (SLO)

25 January 2004; 20:00	Denmark	24–20	Spain	Tivoli Hall, Ljubljana; Attendance: 3,000; Referees: Rančík, Beňo (SVK)
25 January 2004; 20:00	Christiansen 5	(12–11)	Belaustegui 7	Tivoli Hall, Ljubljana; Attendance: 3,000; Referees: Rančík, Beňo (SVK)
25 January 2004; 20:00	3× (yellow card) 3× (suspension)	Report	3× (yellow card) 6× (suspension)	Tivoli Hall, Ljubljana; Attendance: 3,000; Referees: Rančík, Beňo (SVK)

=== Group C ===
Pos	Team	Pld	W	D	L	GF	GA	GD	Pts	Qualification
1	Slovenia (H)	3	2	1	0	100	90	+10	5 (Note: Slovenia 29–29 Hungary)	Main round
2	Hungary	3	2	1	0	91	83	+8	5	Main round
3	Czech Republic	3	0	1	2	88	97	−9	1 (Note: Iceland 30–30 Czech Republic)	Main round
4	Iceland	3	0	1	2	87	96	−9	1	

Source: EHF
Rules for classification: 1) points; 2) head-to-head points; 3) head-to-head goal difference; 4) head-to-head number of goals scored; 5) goal difference.
(H) Hosts
Notes:

22 January 2004; 18:00	Czech Republic	25–30	Hungary	Zlatorog Arena, Celje; Attendance: 2,500; Referees: Hansson, Olsson (SWE)
22 January 2004; 18:00	Juříček 7	(10–17)	Pásztor 8	Zlatorog Arena, Celje; Attendance: 2,500; Referees: Hansson, Olsson (SWE)
22 January 2004; 18:00	3× (yellow card) 6× (suspension)	Report	3× (yellow card) 5× (suspension)	Zlatorog Arena, Celje; Attendance: 2,500; Referees: Hansson, Olsson (SWE)

22 January 2004; 20:30	Iceland	28–34	Slovenia	Zlatorog Arena, Celje; Attendance: 4,620; Referees: Goulão, Macau (POR)
22 January 2004; 20:30	Stefánsson 7	(13–13)	Vugrinec 9	Zlatorog Arena, Celje; Attendance: 4,620; Referees: Goulão, Macau (POR)
22 January 2004; 20:30	2× (yellow card) 5× (suspension)	Report	3× (yellow card) 5× (suspension)	Zlatorog Arena, Celje; Attendance: 4,620; Referees: Goulão, Macau (POR)

23 January 2004; 18:30	Hungary	32–29	Iceland	Zlatorog Arena, Celje; Attendance: 2,800; Referees: Nachevski, Nachevski (MKD)
23 January 2004; 18:30	Díaz 9	(15–15)	García, Stefánsson 7	Zlatorog Arena, Celje; Attendance: 2,800; Referees: Nachevski, Nachevski (MKD)
23 January 2004; 18:30	3× (yellow card) 5× (suspension)	Report	4× (yellow card) 5× (suspension) 1× (red card)	Zlatorog Arena, Celje; Attendance: 2,800; Referees: Nachevski, Nachevski (MKD)

23 January 2004; 20:30	Slovenia	37–33	Czech Republic	Zlatorog Arena, Celje; Attendance: 4,620; Referees: Vakula, Liudovyk (UKR)
23 January 2004; 20:30	Lubej 9	(15–18)	Filip, Juříček 7	Zlatorog Arena, Celje; Attendance: 4,620; Referees: Vakula, Liudovyk (UKR)
23 January 2004; 20:30	3× (yellow card) 9× (suspension)	Report	4× (yellow card) 7× (suspension)	Zlatorog Arena, Celje; Attendance: 4,620; Referees: Vakula, Liudovyk (UKR)

25 January 2004; 18:30	Iceland	30–30	Czech Republic	Zlatorog Arena, Celje; Attendance: 3,000; Referees: Pleșa, Cîrligeanu (ROU)
25 January 2004; 18:30	García 7	(15–17)	Jícha 7	Zlatorog Arena, Celje; Attendance: 3,000; Referees: Pleșa, Cîrligeanu (ROU)
25 January 2004; 18:30	3× (yellow card) 4× (suspension)	Report	3× (yellow card) 3× (suspension)	Zlatorog Arena, Celje; Attendance: 3,000; Referees: Pleșa, Cîrligeanu (ROU)

25 January 2004; 20:30	Slovenia	29–29	Hungary	Zlatorog Arena, Celje; Attendance: 4,616; Referees: Breto, Huelin (ESP)
25 January 2004; 20:30	Jovičič 6	(13–14)	Nagy 9	Zlatorog Arena, Celje; Attendance: 4,616; Referees: Breto, Huelin (ESP)
25 January 2004; 20:30	3× (yellow card) 5× (suspension)	Report	3× (yellow card) 2× (suspension)	Zlatorog Arena, Celje; Attendance: 4,616; Referees: Breto, Huelin (ESP)

=== Group D ===
Pos	Team	Pld	W	D	L	GF	GA	GD	Pts	Qualification
1	France	3	2	1	0	81	74	+7	5	Main round
2	Serbia and Montenegro	3	2	0	1	86	78	+8	4	Main round
3	Germany	3	1	1	1	96	89	+7	3	Main round
4	Poland	3	0	0	3	86	108	−22	0	

Source: EHF
Rules for classification: 1) points; 2) head-to-head points; 3) head-to-head goal difference; 4) head-to-head number of goals scored; 5) goal difference.

22 January 2004; 18:00	France	29–25	Poland	Bonifika Hall, Koper; Attendance: 2,000; Referees: Vakula, Liudovyk (UKR)
22 January 2004; 18:00	Anquetil 6	(14–16)	Bielecki 7	Bonifika Hall, Koper; Attendance: 2,000; Referees: Vakula, Liudovyk (UKR)
22 January 2004; 18:00	3× (yellow card) 6× (suspension)	Report	3× (yellow card) 8× (suspension)	Bonifika Hall, Koper; Attendance: 2,000; Referees: Vakula, Liudovyk (UKR)

22 January 2004; 20:30	Germany	26–28	Serbia and Montenegro	Bonifika Hall, Koper; Attendance: 2,000; Referees: Breto, Huelin (ESP)
22 January 2004; 20:30	Jansen 8	(10–12)	Ma. Krivokapić 6	Bonifika Hall, Koper; Attendance: 2,000; Referees: Breto, Huelin (ESP)
22 January 2004; 20:30	2× (yellow card) 5× (suspension)	Report	3× (yellow card) 8× (suspension) 1× (red card)	Bonifika Hall, Koper; Attendance: 2,000; Referees: Breto, Huelin (ESP)

23 January 2004; 18:30	Serbia and Montenegro	20–23	France	Bonifika Hall, Koper; Attendance: 2,164; Referees: Rančík, Beňo (SVK)
23 January 2004; 18:30	Maksić, Nikolić 4	(7–13)	Anquetil 6	Bonifika Hall, Koper; Attendance: 2,164; Referees: Rančík, Beňo (SVK)
23 January 2004; 18:30	2× (yellow card) 8× (suspension) 1× (red card)	Report	3× (yellow card) 5× (suspension)	Bonifika Hall, Koper; Attendance: 2,164; Referees: Rančík, Beňo (SVK)

23 January 2004; 20:30	Poland	32–41	Germany	Bonifika Hall, Koper; Attendance: 2,000; Referees: Repenšek, Požežnik (SLO)
23 January 2004; 20:30	Tkaczyk 9	(13–21)	Baur 12	Bonifika Hall, Koper; Attendance: 2,000; Referees: Repenšek, Požežnik (SLO)
23 January 2004; 20:30	3× (yellow card) 9× (suspension) 1× (red card)	Report	4× (yellow card) 8× (suspension)	Bonifika Hall, Koper; Attendance: 2,000; Referees: Repenšek, Požežnik (SLO)

25 January 2004; 18:30	Germany	29–29	France	Bonifika Hall, Koper; Attendance: 2,164; Referees: Goulão, Macau (POR)
25 January 2004; 18:30	Schwarzer 7	(14–13)	Karabatić 10	Bonifika Hall, Koper; Attendance: 2,164; Referees: Goulão, Macau (POR)
25 January 2004; 18:30	3× (yellow card) 7× (suspension)	Report	3× (yellow card) 5× (suspension)	Bonifika Hall, Koper; Attendance: 2,164; Referees: Goulão, Macau (POR)

25 January 2004; 20:30	Serbia and Montenegro	38–29	Poland	Bonifika Hall, Koper; Attendance: 1,000; Referees: Boye, Jensen (DEN)
25 January 2004; 20:30	Maksić 8	(19–11)	Tkaczyk 7	Bonifika Hall, Koper; Attendance: 1,000; Referees: Boye, Jensen (DEN)
25 January 2004; 20:30	3× (yellow card) 4× (suspension)	Report	3× (yellow card) 8× (suspension) 1× (red card)	Bonifika Hall, Koper; Attendance: 1,000; Referees: Boye, Jensen (DEN)

== Main round ==
=== Group I ===
Pos	Team	Pld	W	D	L	GF	GA	GD	Pts	Qualification
1	Croatia	5	4	1	0	138	131	+7	9	Semifinals
2	Denmark	5	4	0	1	153	125	+28	8	Semifinals
3	Russia	5	3	1	1	149	137	+12	7	Fifth place game
4	Sweden	5	2	0	3	145	144	+1	4	Seventh place game
5	Spain	5	1	0	4	133	143	−10	2	
6	Switzerland	5	0	0	5	115	153	−38	0	

Source: EHF
Rules for classification: 1) points; 2) head-to-head points; 3) head-to-head goal difference; 4) head-to-head number of goals scored; 5) goal difference.

27 January 2004; 16:00	Switzerland	24–26	Spain	Zlatorog Arena, Celje; Attendance: 1,000; Referees: Nachevski, Nachevski (MKD)
27 January 2004; 16:00	Kostadinovich 7	(13–13)	García 8	Zlatorog Arena, Celje; Attendance: 1,000; Referees: Nachevski, Nachevski (MKD)
27 January 2004; 16:00	3× (yellow card) 5× (suspension)	Report	3× (yellow card) 4× (suspension)	Zlatorog Arena, Celje; Attendance: 1,000; Referees: Nachevski, Nachevski (MKD)

27 January 2004; 18:00	Sweden	26–28	Croatia	Zlatorog Arena, Celje; Attendance: 2,200; Referees: Goulão, Macau (POR)
27 January 2004; 18:00	Boquist 7	(11–16)	four players 5	Zlatorog Arena, Celje; Attendance: 2,200; Referees: Goulão, Macau (POR)
27 January 2004; 18:00	3× (yellow card) 3× (suspension)	Report	4× (yellow card) 4× (suspension)	Zlatorog Arena, Celje; Attendance: 2,200; Referees: Goulão, Macau (POR)

27 January 2004; 20:00	Russia	31–36	Denmark	Zlatorog Arena, Celje; Attendance: 2,000; Referees: Lemme, Ullrich (GER)
27 January 2004; 20:00	Koksharov 7	(15–19)	Christiansen, Stryger 7	Zlatorog Arena, Celje; Attendance: 2,000; Referees: Lemme, Ullrich (GER)
27 January 2004; 20:00	3× (yellow card) 4× (suspension) 1× (red card)	Report	3× (yellow card) 6× (suspension)	Zlatorog Arena, Celje; Attendance: 2,000; Referees: Lemme, Ullrich (GER)

28 January 2004; 16:00	Russia	36–30	Spain	Zlatorog Arena, Celje; Attendance: 1,000; Referees: Repenšek, Požežnik (SLO)
28 January 2004; 16:00	Koksharov 10	(16–14)	Hernández 8	Zlatorog Arena, Celje; Attendance: 1,000; Referees: Repenšek, Požežnik (SLO)
28 January 2004; 16:00	3× (yellow card) 6× (suspension)	Report	3× (yellow card) 6× (suspension)	Zlatorog Arena, Celje; Attendance: 1,000; Referees: Repenšek, Požežnik (SLO)

28 January 2004; 18:00	Switzerland	27–30	Croatia	Zlatorog Arena, Celje; Attendance: 700; Referees: Kékes, Kékes (HUN)
28 January 2004; 18:00	Kostadinovich 7	(13–15)	Balić 6	Zlatorog Arena, Celje; Attendance: 700; Referees: Kékes, Kékes (HUN)
28 January 2004; 18:00	3× (yellow card) 2× (suspension)	Report	2× (yellow card) 4× (suspension)	Zlatorog Arena, Celje; Attendance: 700; Referees: Kékes, Kékes (HUN)

28 January 2004; 20:00	Sweden	28–34	Denmark	Zlatorog Arena, Celje; Attendance: 800; Referees: Vakula, Liudovyk (UKR)
28 January 2004; 20:00	Lövgren 9	(14–18)	Knudsen 8	Zlatorog Arena, Celje; Attendance: 800; Referees: Vakula, Liudovyk (UKR)
28 January 2004; 20:00	3× (yellow card) 6× (suspension)	Report	3× (yellow card) 3× (suspension)	Zlatorog Arena, Celje; Attendance: 800; Referees: Vakula, Liudovyk (UKR)

29 January 2004; 16:00	Switzerland	20–34	Denmark	Zlatorog Arena, Celje; Attendance: 1,000; Referees: Rančík, Beňo (SVK)
29 January 2004; 16:00	Kostadinovich 5	(9–18)	Hjermind, Nielsen 7	Zlatorog Arena, Celje; Attendance: 1,000; Referees: Rančík, Beňo (SVK)
29 January 2004; 16:00	3× (yellow card) 4× (suspension) 1× (red card)	Report	3× (yellow card) 3× (suspension)	Zlatorog Arena, Celje; Attendance: 1,000; Referees: Rančík, Beňo (SVK)

29 January 2004; 18:00	Sweden	29–28	Spain	Zlatorog Arena, Celje; Attendance: 2,300; Referees: Nachevski, Nachevski (MKD)
29 January 2004; 18:00	Källman 9	(10–12)	Pérez 8	Zlatorog Arena, Celje; Attendance: 2,300; Referees: Nachevski, Nachevski (MKD)
29 January 2004; 18:00	3× (yellow card) 4× (suspension)	Report	3× (yellow card) 5× (suspension)	Zlatorog Arena, Celje; Attendance: 2,300; Referees: Nachevski, Nachevski (MKD)

29 January 2004; 20:00	Russia	24–24	Croatia	Zlatorog Arena, Celje; Attendance: 4,000; Referees: Breto, Huelin (ESP)
29 January 2004; 20:00	Bashkin 6	(13–12)	Džomba 8	Zlatorog Arena, Celje; Attendance: 4,000; Referees: Breto, Huelin (ESP)
29 January 2004; 20:00	3× (yellow card) 4× (suspension)	Report	4× (yellow card) 7× (suspension)	Zlatorog Arena, Celje; Attendance: 4,000; Referees: Breto, Huelin (ESP)

=== Group II ===
Pos	Team	Pld	W	D	L	GF	GA	GD	Pts	Qualification
1	Germany	5	3	1	1	151	131	+20	7 (Note: Slovenia 24–31 Germany)	Semifinals
2	Slovenia (H)	5	3	1	1	144	135	+9	7	Semifinals
3	France	5	2	1	2	134	129	+5	5 (Note: Serbia and Montenegro 20–23 France)	Fifth place game
4	Serbia and Montenegro	5	2	1	2	134	135	−1	5	Seventh place game
5	Hungary	5	1	2	2	132	140	−8	4	
6	Czech Republic	5	1	0	4	147	172	−25	2	

Source: EHF
Rules for classification: 1) points; 2) head-to-head points; 3) head-to-head goal difference; 4) head-to-head number of goals scored; 5) goal difference.
(H) Hosts
Notes:

27 January 2004; 16:30	Hungary	21–29	France	Tivoli Hall, Ljubljana; Attendance: 1,000; Referees: Boye, Jensen (DEN)
27 January 2004; 16:30	Buday 5	(8–14)	Karabatić 5	Tivoli Hall, Ljubljana; Attendance: 1,000; Referees: Boye, Jensen (DEN)
27 January 2004; 16:30	3× (yellow card) 4× (suspension)	Report	3× (yellow card) 4× (suspension)	Tivoli Hall, Ljubljana; Attendance: 1,000; Referees: Boye, Jensen (DEN)

27 January 2004; 18:30	Czech Republic	27–37	Germany	Tivoli Hall, Ljubljana; Attendance: 3,800; Referees: Hansson, Olsson (SWE)
27 January 2004; 18:30	Berka 7	(12–19)	Kehrmann 9	Tivoli Hall, Ljubljana; Attendance: 3,800; Referees: Hansson, Olsson (SWE)
27 January 2004; 18:30	3× (yellow card) 7× (suspension)	Report	3× (yellow card) 3× (suspension)	Tivoli Hall, Ljubljana; Attendance: 3,800; Referees: Hansson, Olsson (SWE)

27 January 2004; 20:30	Slovenia	27–20	Serbia and Montenegro	Tivoli Hall, Ljubljana; Attendance: 7,000; Referees: Rančík, Beňo (SVK)
27 January 2004; 20:30	Lubej 6	(14–11)	Anđelković 5	Tivoli Hall, Ljubljana; Attendance: 7,000; Referees: Rančík, Beňo (SVK)
27 January 2004; 20:30	3× (yellow card) 10× (suspension) 1× (red card)	Report	4× (yellow card) 7× (suspension) 1× (red card)	Tivoli Hall, Ljubljana; Attendance: 7,000; Referees: Rančík, Beňo (SVK)

28 January 2004; 16:30	Czech Republic	32–31	France	Tivoli Hall, Ljubljana; Attendance: 1,000; Referees: Pleșa, Cîrligeanu (ROU)
28 January 2004; 16:30	Juříček 9	(17–15)	G. Gille, Girault 6	Tivoli Hall, Ljubljana; Attendance: 1,000; Referees: Pleșa, Cîrligeanu (ROU)
28 January 2004; 16:30	3× (yellow card) 6× (suspension)	Report	4× (yellow card) 5× (suspension)	Tivoli Hall, Ljubljana; Attendance: 1,000; Referees: Pleșa, Cîrligeanu (ROU)

28 January 2004; 18:30	Hungary	29–29	Serbia and Montenegro	Tivoli Hall, Ljubljana; Attendance: 4,000; Referees: Goulão, Macau (POR)
28 January 2004; 18:30	Császár 7	(10–15)	Milosavljević 9	Tivoli Hall, Ljubljana; Attendance: 4,000; Referees: Goulão, Macau (POR)
28 January 2004; 18:30	4× (yellow card) 6× (suspension)	Report	3× (yellow card) 8× (suspension)	Tivoli Hall, Ljubljana; Attendance: 4,000; Referees: Goulão, Macau (POR)

28 January 2004; 20:30	Slovenia	24–31	Germany	Tivoli Hall, Ljubljana; Attendance: 6,000; Referees: Breto, Huelin (ESP)
28 January 2004; 20:30	Kavtičnik 5	(10–18)	Stephan 8	Tivoli Hall, Ljubljana; Attendance: 6,000; Referees: Breto, Huelin (ESP)
28 January 2004; 20:30	3× (yellow card) 7× (suspension) 1× (red card)	Report	3× (yellow card) 3× (suspension)	Tivoli Hall, Ljubljana; Attendance: 6,000; Referees: Breto, Huelin (ESP)

29 January 2004; 16:30	Czech Republic	30–37	Serbia and Montenegro	Tivoli Hall, Ljubljana; Attendance: 1,000; Referees: Vakula, Liudovyk (UKR)
29 January 2004; 16:30	Berka 6	(16–21)	Nikolić 8	Tivoli Hall, Ljubljana; Attendance: 1,000; Referees: Vakula, Liudovyk (UKR)
29 January 2004; 16:30	3× (yellow card) 3× (suspension)	Report	3× (yellow card) 5× (suspension)	Tivoli Hall, Ljubljana; Attendance: 1,000; Referees: Vakula, Liudovyk (UKR)

29 January 2004; 18:30	Hungary	23–28	Germany	Tivoli Hall, Ljubljana; Attendance: 5,000; Referees: Pleșa, Cîrligeanu (ROU)
29 January 2004; 18:30	Díaz 6	(12–16)	Zeitz 8	Tivoli Hall, Ljubljana; Attendance: 5,000; Referees: Pleșa, Cîrligeanu (ROU)
29 January 2004; 18:30	3× (yellow card) 5× (suspension)	Report	3× (yellow card) 7× (suspension)	Tivoli Hall, Ljubljana; Attendance: 5,000; Referees: Pleșa, Cîrligeanu (ROU)

29 January 2004; 20:30	Slovenia	27–22	France	Tivoli Hall, Ljubljana; Attendance: 7,000; Referees: Hansson, Olsson (SWE)
29 January 2004; 20:30	Kavtičnik 8	(12–9)	Anquetil 6	Tivoli Hall, Ljubljana; Attendance: 7,000; Referees: Hansson, Olsson (SWE)
29 January 2004; 20:30	3× (yellow card) 11× (suspension)	Report	3× (yellow card) 4× (suspension)	Tivoli Hall, Ljubljana; Attendance: 7,000; Referees: Hansson, Olsson (SWE)

== Final round ==
=== Bracket ===
Semifinals
31 January
Croatia	25
Slovenia	27
31 January
Denmark	20
Germany	22

Final
1 February
Slovenia	25
Germany	30
Third place
1 February
Croatia	27
Denmark	31

=== Semifinals ===
31 January 2004; 15:00	Denmark	20–22	Germany	Tivoli Hall, Ljubljana; Attendance: 6,500; Referees: Rančík, Beňo (SVK)
31 January 2004; 15:00	Jeppesen 5	(11–11)	Immel 7	Tivoli Hall, Ljubljana; Attendance: 6,500; Referees: Rančík, Beňo (SVK)
31 January 2004; 15:00	3× (yellow card) 5× (suspension)	Report	2× (yellow card) 6× (suspension)	Tivoli Hall, Ljubljana; Attendance: 6,500; Referees: Rančík, Beňo (SVK)

31 January 2004; 17:30	Croatia	25–27	Slovenia	Tivoli Hall, Ljubljana; Attendance: 7,000; Referees: Vakula, Ljudovik (UKR)
31 January 2004; 17:30	Džomba 12	(13–15)	Kavtičnik 6	Tivoli Hall, Ljubljana; Attendance: 7,000; Referees: Vakula, Ljudovik (UKR)
31 January 2004; 17:30	3× (yellow card) 4× (suspension)	Report	4× (yellow card) 8× (suspension) 1× (red card)	Tivoli Hall, Ljubljana; Attendance: 7,000; Referees: Vakula, Ljudovik (UKR)

=== Seventh place game ===
31 January 2004; 12:30	Sweden	35–34	Serbia and Montenegro	Tivoli Hall, Ljubljana; Attendance: 1,000; Referees: Lemme, Ullrich (GER)
31 January 2004; 12:30	Andersson, Larholm 7	(16–17)	Mi. Krivokapić 6	Tivoli Hall, Ljubljana; Attendance: 1,000; Referees: Lemme, Ullrich (GER)
31 January 2004; 12:30	3× (yellow card) 3× (suspension)	Report	3× (yellow card) 5× (suspension)	Tivoli Hall, Ljubljana; Attendance: 1,000; Referees: Lemme, Ullrich (GER)

=== Fifth place game ===
1 February 2004; 12:30	Russia	28–26	France	Tivoli Hall, Ljubljana; Attendance: 1,000; Referees: Repenšek, Požežnik (SLO)
1 February 2004; 12:30	Ivanov 8	(14–11)	Karabatić 7	Tivoli Hall, Ljubljana; Attendance: 1,000; Referees: Repenšek, Požežnik (SLO)
1 February 2004; 12:30	3× (yellow card) 5× (suspension) 1× (red card)	Report	3× (yellow card) 5× (suspension)	Tivoli Hall, Ljubljana; Attendance: 1,000; Referees: Repenšek, Požežnik (SLO)

=== Third place game ===
1 February 2004; 15:00	Croatia	27–31	Denmark	Tivoli Hall, Ljubljana; Attendance: 7,000; Referees: Breto, Huelin (ESP)
1 February 2004; 15:00	Lacković 8	(14–15)	Christiansen 9	Tivoli Hall, Ljubljana; Attendance: 7,000; Referees: Breto, Huelin (ESP)
1 February 2004; 15:00	4× (yellow card) 4× (suspension)	Report	2× (yellow card) 6× (suspension)	Tivoli Hall, Ljubljana; Attendance: 7,000; Referees: Breto, Huelin (ESP)

=== Final ===
1 February 2004; 17:30	Slovenia	25–30	Germany	Tivoli Hall, Ljubljana; Attendance: 7,000; Referees: Hansson, Olsson (SWE)
1 February 2004; 17:30	Vugrinec 6	(10–16)	Kehrmann 9	Tivoli Hall, Ljubljana; Attendance: 7,000; Referees: Hansson, Olsson (SWE)
1 February 2004; 17:30	3× (yellow card) 3× (suspension)	Report	2× (yellow card) 1× (suspension)	Tivoli Hall, Ljubljana; Attendance: 7,000; Referees: Hansson, Olsson (SWE)

== Ranking and statistics ==
=== Final ranking ===
Rank	Team
1st place, gold medalist(s)	Germany
2nd place, silver medalist(s)	Slovenia
3rd place, bronze medalist(s)	Denmark
4	Croatia
5	Russia
6	France
7	Sweden
8	Serbia and Montenegro
9	Hungary
10	Spain
11	Czech Republic
12	Switzerland
13	Iceland
14	Portugal
15	Ukraine
16	Poland

Qualified for the 2004 Summer Olympics

=== All-Star Team ===
Position	Player
Goalkeeper	Henning Fritz (GER)
Right wing	Vid Kavtičnik (SLO)
Right back	Volker Zerbe (GER)
Centre back	Ivano Balić (CRO)
Left back	Nikola Karabatić (FRA)
Left wing	Eduard Koksharov (RUS)
Pivot	Michael Knudsen (DEN)
Most valuable player	Ivano Balić (CRO)

Source: EHF Archived 19 September 2020 at the Wayback Machine

=== Top goalscorers ===
Rank	Name	Team	Goals	Shots	%
1	Mirza Džomba	Croatia	46	64	75
2	Florian Kehrmann	Germany	45	81	56
3	Daniel Stephan	Germany	42	85	49
4	Michael Knudsen	Denmark	40	49	82
4	Vid Kavtičnik	Slovenia	40	65	62
4	Robbie Kostadinovich	Switzerland	40	81	49
7	Eduard Koksharov	Russia	38	56	68
7	Renato Vugrinec	Slovenia	38	77	49
9	Nikola Karabatić	France	35	71	49
10	Søren Stryger	Denmark	34	42	81
10	Aleksey Rastvortsev	Russia	34	71	48

Source: EHF

=== Top goalkeepers ===
(minimum 20% of total shots received by team)

Rank	Name	Team	%	Saves	Shots
1	Yevgeny Budko	Ukraine	43	23	54
2	Michael Bruun	Denmark	41	33	80
3	Aleksey Kostygov	Russia	40	23	58
4	Christian Ramota	Germany	39	29	74
4	Beno Lapajne	Slovenia	39	56	145
6	Nándor Fazekas	Hungary	38	49	130
7	Kasper Hvidt	Denmark	37	95	254
7	Henning Fritz	Germany	37	97	260
7	János Szathmári	Hungary	37	52	140
10	Mario Kelentrić	Croatia	35	36	103
10	Vlado Šola	Croatia	35	51	146
10	Martin Galia	Czech Republic	35	86	248
10	Antoine Ebinger	Switzerland	35	39	113

Source: EHF
