= HBG =

HBG may refer to:

- HBG (time signal), a former Swiss radio transmission facility
- Hachette Book Group, an American publisher
- Haliburton Broadcasting Group, a former Canadian broadcaster
- Handball Grauholz, a Swiss handball club
- Hattiesburg (Amtrak station), in Mississippi, United States
- Hattiesburg Bobby L. Chain Municipal Airport, in Mississippi, United States
- Heather Baron-Gracie, lead singer and guitarist of indie pop band Pale Waves
- Hermann-Böse-Gymnasium, a secondary school in Germany
- Hollandsche Beton Groep, a Netherlands-based construction and civil engineering group
- Batu Gajah Hospital, a public hospital in Perak, Malaysia
- Hollywood Bowl Group, bowling and mini-golf company based in the United Kingdom
- Hicky's Bengal Gazette, the first newspaper printed in India
- Horácio Bento de Gouveia, a middle school in Funchal, Madeira, Portugal
- The Habit Burger Grill, a California-based fast casual restaurant chain
