= Michael V. Knudsen =

Danish handball player (born 1978)

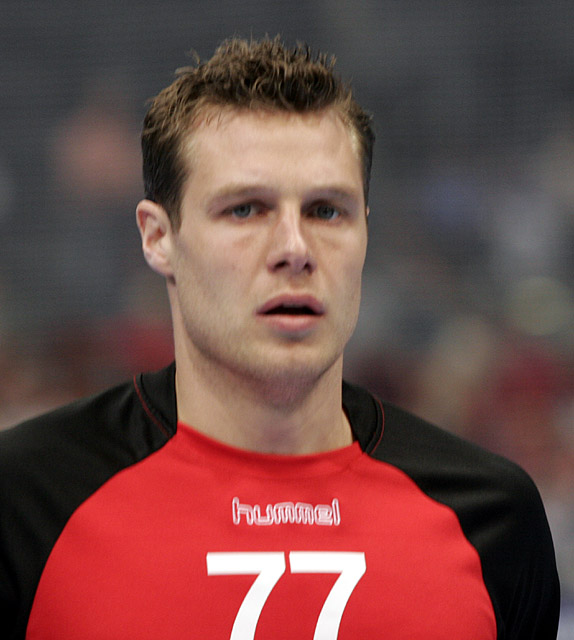

Personal information
- Full name: Michael Vestergaard Knudsen
- Nationality: Danish
- Born: 4 September 1978 (age 48) Hobro, Denmark
- Height: 1.92 m (6 ft 4 in)

Sport
- Sport: Handball
- Position: Pivot
- Current club: Bjerringbro-Silkeborg
- Number: 77

Senior clubs
- Years: Team
- 1997–2002: Viborg HK
- 2002–2004: Skjern Håndbold
- 2004–2005: Viborg HK
- 2005–2014: SG Flensburg-Handewitt
- 2014–2020: Bjerringbro-Silkeborg
National team
Years	Team	Apps	(Gls)
1999–2014	Denmark	244	(797)
Medal record
World Championship
Silver medal – second place	2011 Sweden	Team
Bronze medal – third place	2007 Germany	Team
European Championship
Gold medal – first place	2008 Norway	Team
Silver medal – second place	2014 Denmark	Team
Bronze medal – third place	2006 Switzerland	Team
Bronze medal – third place	2004 Slovenia	Team
Bronze medal – third place	2002 Sweden	Team
Junior World Championship
Gold medal – first place	1999 Qatar	Team

Michael Vestergaard Knudsen (born 4 September 1978) is a Danish former team handball player. He is a European Champion, having won the 2008 European Men's Handball Championship with the Danish national handball team. He received a bronze medal at the 2007 World Men's Handball Championship, where he was voted into the All-star-team (as Pivot). In 2011 he won a silver medal at the world championships, with Denmark losing to France in what was described as "the most thrilling World Championships final since decades".

At the 2006 European Men's Handball Championship he was number three on the top scoring list, and the Danish team received bronze medals, as they did in 2002 and 2004. Knudsen currently plays for Danish side Bjerringbro-Silkeborg. In 2014, he was part of the Danish team that won the silver medal at the European Championship.

At Olympic level, he has represented Denmark at the 2008 and 2012 Summer Olympics.

He retired from Professional handball in 2021 during the corona pandemic. Today he works as sporting director at his former club Bjerringbro-Silkeborg.

== Honours ==
=== Club ===
- Danish Championship:
  - Gold: 2016

=== International ===
- World championship:
  - Silver: 2011
  - Bronze: 2007
- European championship:
  - Gold: 2008
  - Silver: 2014
  - Bronze: 2002, 2004. 2006

== Individual awards ==
- All-Star Pivot of the World Championship: 2007
- Danish Handball Cup MVP 2000, 2003
