= Patrick Zieker =

German handball player (born 1993)

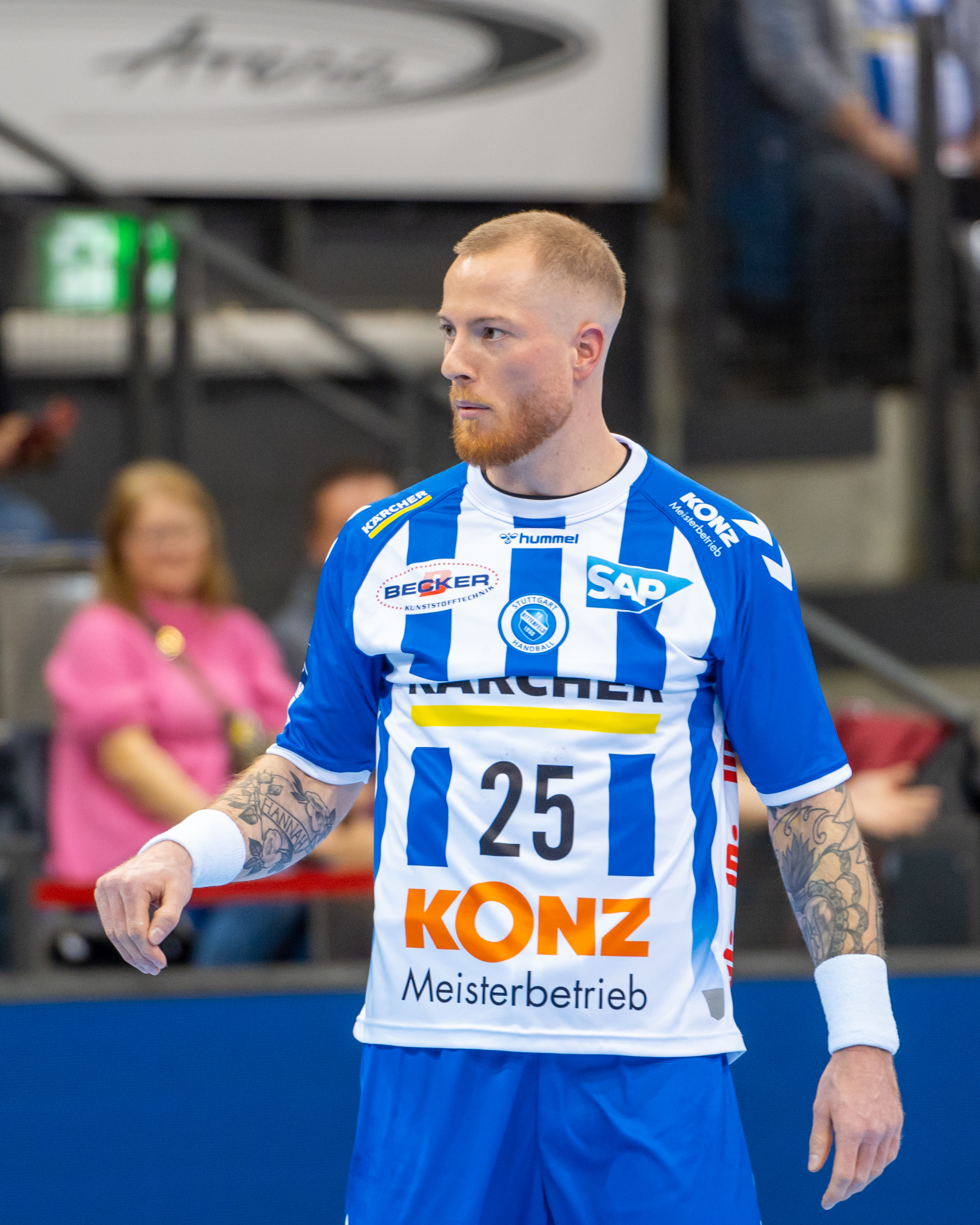

Personal information
- Nationality: German
- Born: 13 December 1993 (age 32) Ludwigsburg, Germany
- Height: 1.86 m (6 ft 1 in)

Sport
- Sport: Handball
- Position: Left wing
- Current club: TVB 1898 Stuttgart
- Number: 25

Youth career
- Years: Team
- –2008: HG Steinheim-Kleinbottwar
- 2008–2011: SG BBM Bietigheim

Senior clubs
- Years: Team
- 2011–2012: SG BBM Bietigheim
- 2012–2019: TBV Lemgo
- 2019–: TVB 1898 Stuttgart
National team
Years	Team	Apps	(Gls)
2020–	Germany	13	(21)

Patrick Zieker (born 13 December 1993) is a German handball player for TVB 1898 Stuttgart and the German national team.

He represented Germany at the 2020 European Men's Handball Championship.
