= Zoran Lubej =

Slovene handball player

Personal information
- Nationality: Slovenian
- Born: 14 December 1975 (age 50) Celje, SFR Yugoslavia
- Height: 193 cm (76 in)

Sport
- Sport: Handball

Senior clubs
- Years: Team
- –: RD Prule 67
National team
| Years | Team | Apps | (Gls) |
| – | Slovenia | 162 | (385) |

Zoran Lubej (born 14 December 1975) is a Slovenian male handball player. He was a member of the Slovenia men's national handball team. He was part of the team at the 2000 Summer Olympics, playing eight matches. He also participated in the 2004 European Men's Handball Championship, where the Slovenian team won a silver medal.

On club level he played for RD Prule 67 from Ljubljana, and has also previously played at BM Antequera, SDC San Antonio, and Paris Saint-Germain. In 2009, Lubej played under contract with RK Zagreb between July and December.
