= Lucas Meister =

Swiss handball player

Personal information
- Full name: Lukas Julien Meister
- Nationality: Swiss
- Born: 16 August 1996 (age 30) Basel, Switzerland
- Height: 1.96 m (6 ft 5 in)

Sport
- Sport: Handball
- Position: Pivot
- Current club: SC Magdeburg

Senior clubs
- Years: Team
- 2015–2019: Kadetten Schaffhausen
- 2019–2022: GWD Minden
- 2022–2024: SC Magdeburg
- 2024–: Kadetten Schaffhausen
National team
| Years | Team | Apps | (Gls) |
| 2015– | Switzerland | 95 | (225) |
- Updated on 10 August 2025

Lucas Julien Meister (born 16 August 1996) is a Swiss handball player for SC Magdeburg and the Swiss national team.

He represented Switzerland at the 2020 and 2026 European Men's Handball Championships.
