= Bojan Beljanski =

Serbian handball player (born 1986)

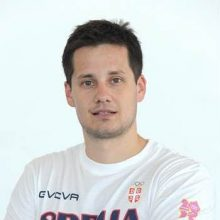

Personal information
- Full name: Bojan Beljanski
- Nationality: Serbian
- Born: 22 June 1986 (age 40) Bačka Palanka, SFR Yugoslavia
- Height: 2.02 m (6 ft 8 in)

Sport
- Sport: Handball
- Position: Pivot
- Current club: Vojvodina

Youth career
- Years: Team
- –: Sintelon

Senior clubs
- Years: Team
- 2003–2008: Sintelon
- 2008–2011: Arrate
- 2011–2012: HC Kriens-Luzern
- 2012–2015: Frisch Auf Göppingen
- 2015–2017: Bregenz
- 2018–2020: Kadetten Schaffhausen
- 2020–2021: Vojvodina
National team
Years	Team	Apps	(Gls)
2008–2019	Serbia	64	(59)
Medal record
Men's handball
Representing Serbia and Montenegro
U21 World Championship
Silver medal – second place	2005 Hungary	Team
U19 World Championship
Gold medal – first place	2005 Qatar	Team
U18 European Championship
Gold medal – first place	2004 Serbia and Montenegro	Team
Representing Serbia
European Championship
Silver medal – second place	2012 Serbia	Team

Bojan Beljanski (Serbian Cyrillic: Бојан Бељански; born 22 June 1986) is a Serbian handball player for Vojvodina and the Serbia national team.

== Club career ==
After starting out at his hometown club Sintelon (later known as Tarkett), Beljanski moved to Spain and signed with Arrate in 2008. He later played for HC Kriens-Luzern, Frisch Auf Göppingen, Bregenz and Kadetten Schaffhausen. After spending 12 years abroad, Beljanski returned to his homeland and joined Vojvodina in 2020.

== International career ==
=== Youth ===
At youth level, Beljanski was a member of the Serbia and Montenegro winning squad at the European Under-18 Championship in August 2004. He subsequently helped his nation win the World Under-19 Championship in August 2005. Later the same month, Beljanski was a member of the team that finished as runners-up at the World Under-21 Championship.

=== Senior ===
At senior level, Beljanski made his major debut for Serbia at the 2012 European Championship, winning the silver medal. He was subsequently selected to compete at the 2012 Summer Olympics.

== Honours ==
Kadetten Schaffhausen

- Swiss Handball League: 2018–19
