= Vid Kavtičnik =

Slovenian handball player (born 1984)

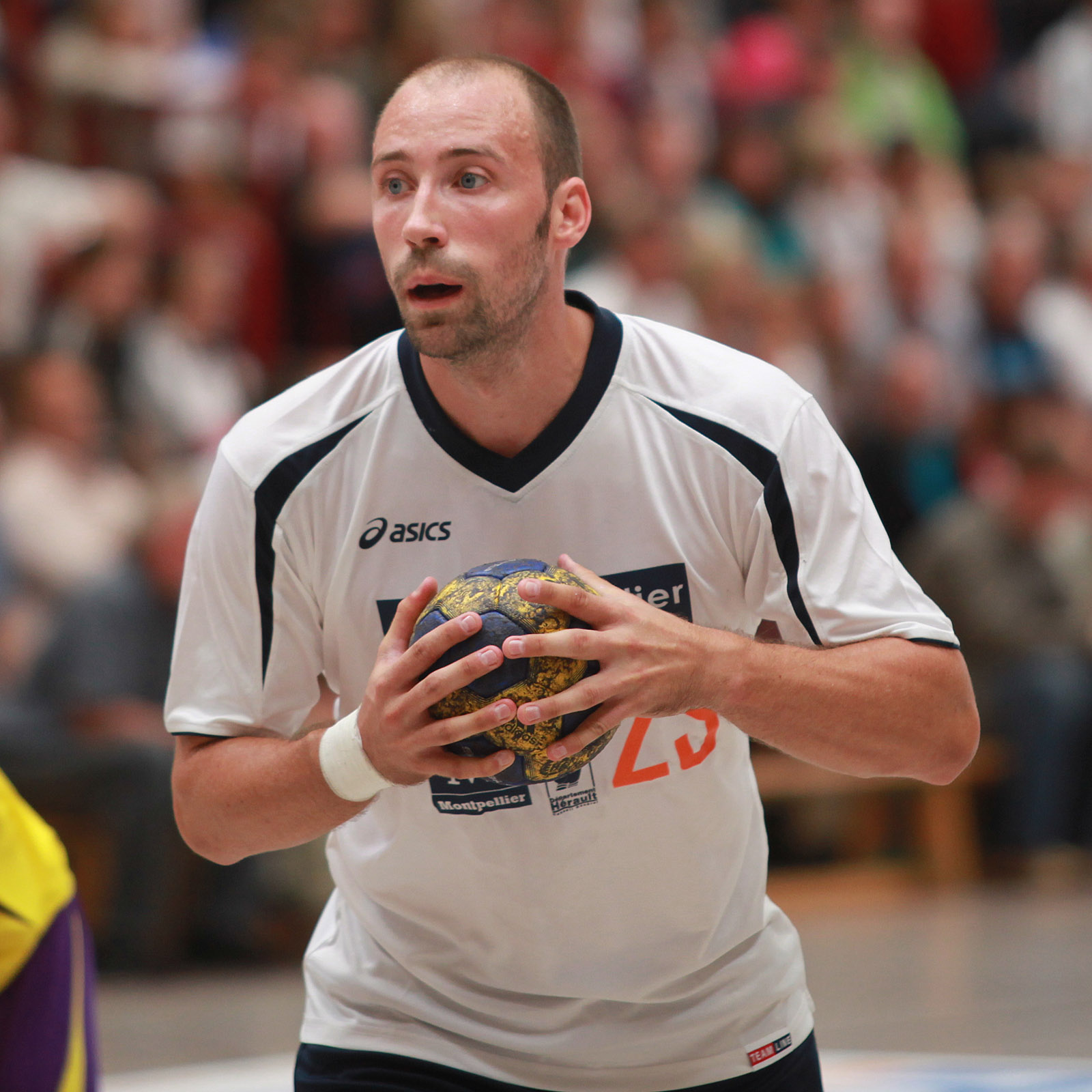

Personal information
- Nationality: Slovenian
- Born: 24 May 1984 (age 42) Slovenj Gradec, SFR Yugoslavia
- Height: 1.91 m (6 ft 3 in)

Sport
- Sport: Handball
- Position: Right back

Senior clubs
- Years: Team
- 1995–2005: RK Gorenje Velenje
- 2005–2009: THW Kiel
- 2009–2019: Montpellier Handball
- 2019–2020: Pays d'Aix UC
- 2020–2021: USAM Nîmes Gard
National team
Years	Team	Apps	(Gls)
2004–2021	Slovenia	197	(543)
Medal record
World Championship
Bronze medal – third place	2017 France
European Championship
Silver medal – second place	2004 Slovenia

Vid Kavtičnik (born 24 May 1984) is a retired Slovenian handball player.

With Slovenia, he competed at the 2004 and 2016 Summer Olympics.

He was included in the European Handball Federation Hall of Fame in 2023.
