= Kévin Bonnefoi =

French handball player (born 1991)

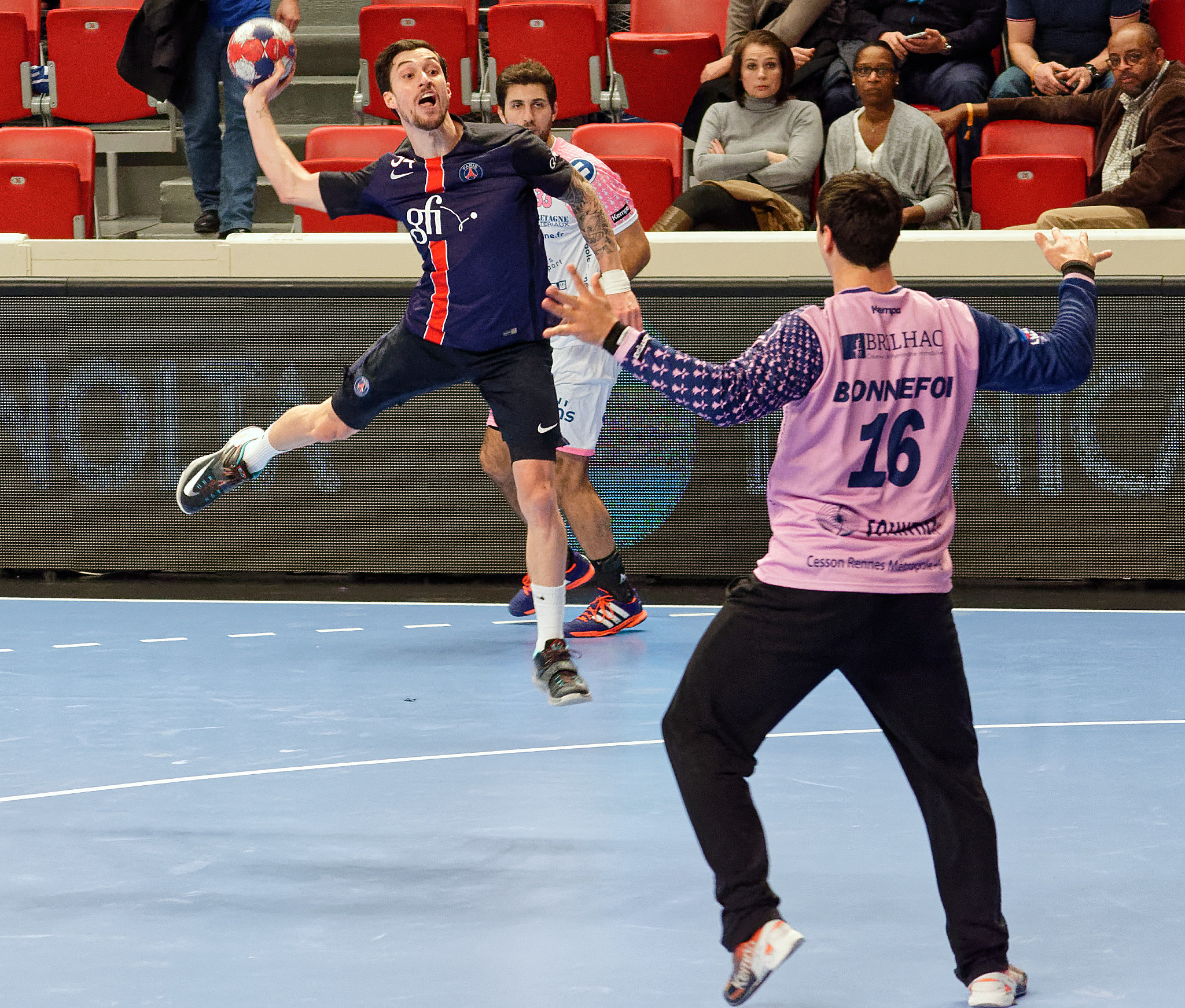
- Bonnefoi (in pink) in 2015

Personal information
- Nationality: French
- Born: 3 December 1991 (age 34) Toulon, France
- Height: 1.90 m (6 ft 3 in)

Sport
- Sport: Handball
- Position: Goalkeeper
- Current club: HC Kriens-Luzern
- Number: 16

Senior clubs
- Years: Team
- 2011–2014: Saint-Raphaël
- 2012–2013: → Istres (loan)
- 2014–2018: Cesson Rennes MHB
- 2018–2023: Montpellier Handball
- 2018–2019: → Fenix Toulouse Handball (loan)
- 2019: → HBC Nantes (loan)
- 2023–2026: HC Kriens-Luzern
- 2026–: Tremblay Handball
National team
Years	Team	Apps	(Gls)
2021–	France	3	(0)

Kévin Bonnefoi (born 3 December 1991) is a French handball player for HC Kriens-Luzern.
