= Samuel Röthlisberger =

Swiss handball player

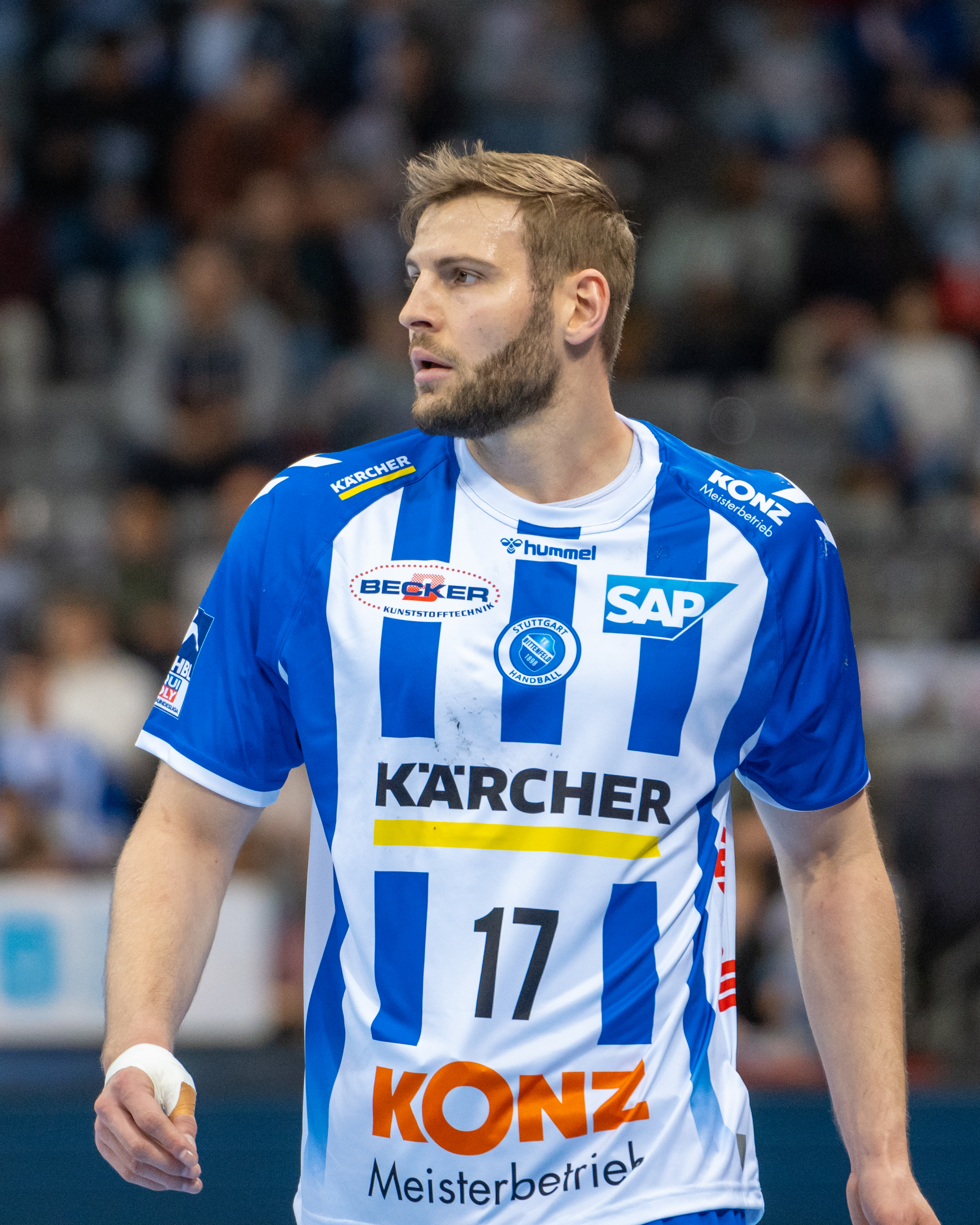

Personal information
- Nationality: Swiss
- Born: 15 August 1996 (age 30) Bern, Switzerland
- Height: 1.99 m (6 ft 6 in)

Sport
- Sport: Handball
- Position: Pivot
- Current club: TV Bittenfeld
- Number: 17
National team
Years	Team	Apps	(Gls)
2016-	Switzerland	85	(22)
- Updated on 8. January 2025

Samuel Röthlisberger (born 15 August 1996) is a Swiss handball player for TV Bittenfeld and the Swiss national team.

He represented Switzerland at the 2020 European Men's Handball Championship.
