= Dimitrij Küttel =

Swiss handball player (born 1994)

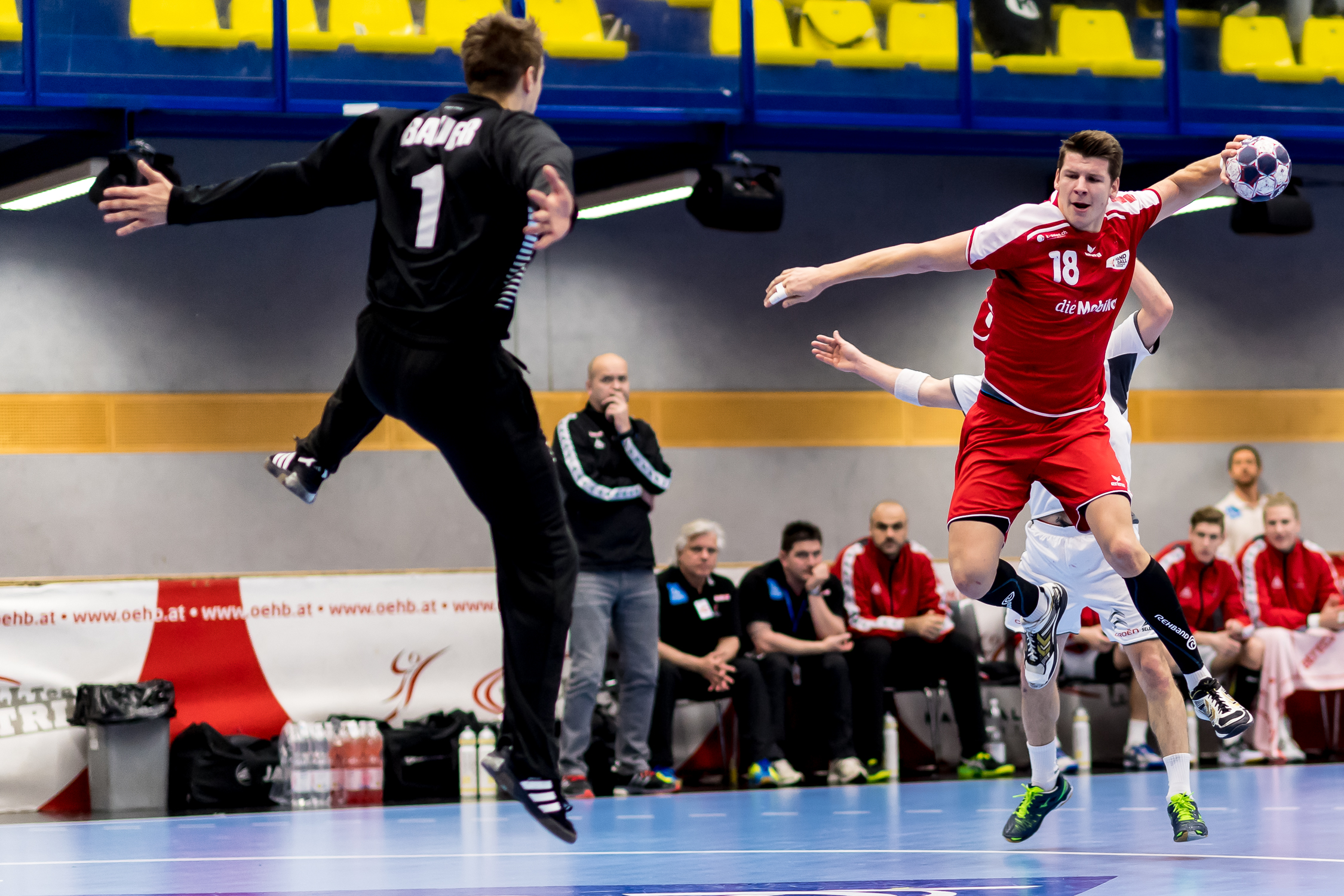

Personal information
- Nationality: Swiss
- Born: 18 February 1994 (age 32) Aarau, Switzerland
- Height: 1.92 m (6 ft 4 in)

Sport
- Sport: Handball
- Position: Right back
- Current club: Kadetten Schaffhausen
- Number: 9

Senior clubs
- Years: Team
- –2022: Kadetten Schaffhausen
- 2022–2025: HC Kriens-Luzern
- 2025–: Kadetten Schaffhausen
National team
Years	Team	Apps	(Gls)
–	Switzerland	94	(185)
- Updated on 23 July 2025

Dimitrij Küttel (born 18 February 1994) is a Swiss handball player for Kadetten Schaffhausen and the Swiss national team.

He represented Switzerland at the 2020 European Men's Handball Championship.

On 31. December 2020 he was diagnosed with Lymphoma. Since end of April 2021 he is in remission. In 2022 he joined HC Kriens-Luzern. Here he won the 2023 and 2025 Swiss Cup in 2023 and 2025. In 2025 he returned to Kadetten Schaffhausen.
