= Lukas Herburger =

Austrian handball player (born 1994)

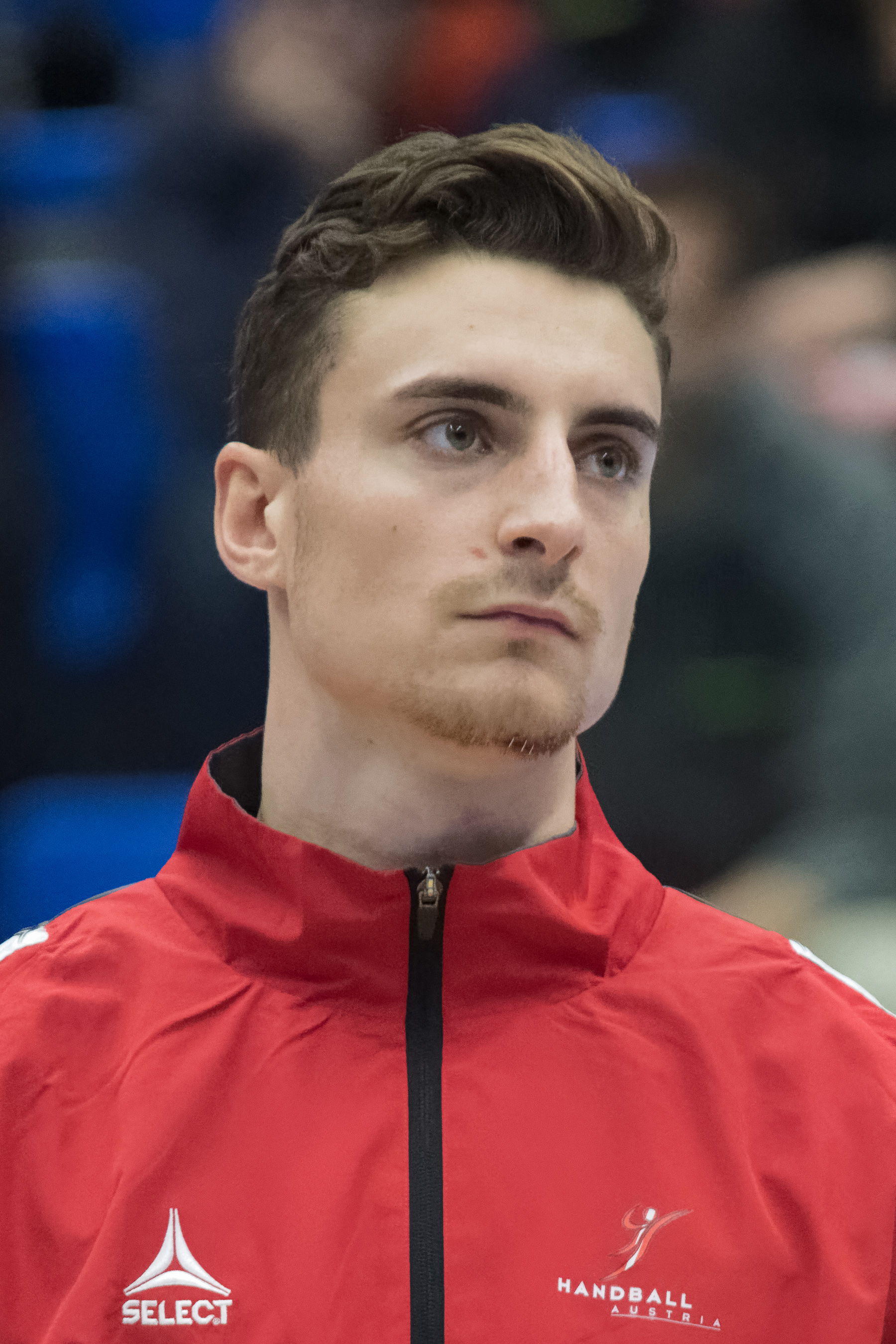

Personal information
- Nationality: Austrian
- Born: 19 December 1994 (age 31) Bregenz, Austria
- Height: 1.97 m (6 ft 6 in)

Sport
- Sport: Handball
- Position: Pivot
- Current club: Kadetten Schaffhausen
- Number: 26

Senior clubs
- Years: Team
- 2011–2018: Alpla HC Hard
- 2018–2024: Kadetten Schaffhausen
- 2024–2026: Füchse Berlin
- 2026–: HC Kriens-Luzern
National team
Years	Team	Apps	(Gls)
2014–	Austria	90	(88)
- Updated on 8 October 2025

Lukas Herburger (born 19 December 1994) is an Austrian handball player for Füchse Berlin and the Austrian national team.

He participated at the 2018 European Men's Handball Championship.

With Füchse he won the 2024-25 Handball-Bundesliga, which was the first in club history. The same season he played in the 2024-25 EHF Champions League final, where Füchse lost to league rivals SC Magdeburg.
