= Lenny Rubin =

Swiss handball player (born 1996)

Personal information
- Nationality: Swiss
- Born: 1 February 1996 (age 30) Dormagen, Germany
- Height: 2.05 m (6 ft 9 in)

Sport
- Sport: Handball
- Position: Left back
- Current club: TVB 1898 Stuttgart
- Number: 44

Senior clubs
- Years: Team
- 2015-2018: Wacker Thun
- 2018-2024: HSG Wetzlar
- 2024-: TVB 1898 Stuttgart
National team
| Years | Team | Apps | (Gls) |
| 2016- | Switzerland | 89 | (338) |
- Updated on 15 August 2025

Lenny Rubin (born 1 February 1996) is a Swiss handball player for German club TVB 1898 Stuttgart and the Swiss national team.

He represented Switzerland at the 2020 European Men's Handball Championship.

His father, Martin Rubin, is also a handball player.
