= Peter Hürlimann =

Swiss handball player

Personal information
- Nationality: Swiss
- Born: 22 October 1958 (age 67)

Sport
- Sport: Handball
- Position: Goalkeeper
National team
Years	Team	Apps	(Gls)
–	Switzerland	241	(0)

Peter Hürlimann (born 22 October 1958) is a Swiss handball player. He competed in the men's tournament at the 1984 Summer Olympics. He has the second most caps for the Switzerland men's national handball team with 241, only behind Max Schär.
