= Kasper Kisum =

Danish handball player (born 1992)

Personal information
- Nationality: Danish
- Born: 20 August 1992 (age 34) Gentofte, Denmark
- Height: 2.00 m (6 ft 7 in)

Sport
- Sport: Handball
- Position: Left Back
- Current club: Saint-Raphaël VHB

Senior clubs
- Years: Team
- 2011-2013: Nordsjælland Håndbold
- 2014-2015: SG Flensburg-Handewitt
- 2015-2016: TV Bittenfeld
- 2016-2017: TSV Hannover-Burgdorf
- 2017-2018: Fenix Toulouse Handball
- 2018-2022: Nordsjælland Håndbold
- 2022-2023: SønderjyskE Håndbold
- 2023: RK Eurofarm Pelister
- 2024-: Saint-Raphaël VHB

Kasper Kisum (born 20 August 1992) is a Danish handball player for Saint-Raphaël VHB.

He played with the German champions league winner club SG Flensburg-Handewitt, starting from the 2014–15 season. In the season 2022-23 Kisum Played for RK Eurofarm Pelister which riched the final of the Cup but ended second. Later they've won the national Championship winning all and losing only one game in the play-offs against the defending Champions RK Vardar. Kisum and his Dane fellow country-man Henneberg were the best players that brought the title.

== Accomplishments ==
RK Eurofarm Pelister (North Macedonia)

- Macedonian Handball Super League

1st: 2023
