= Michal Svajlen =

Swiss handball player

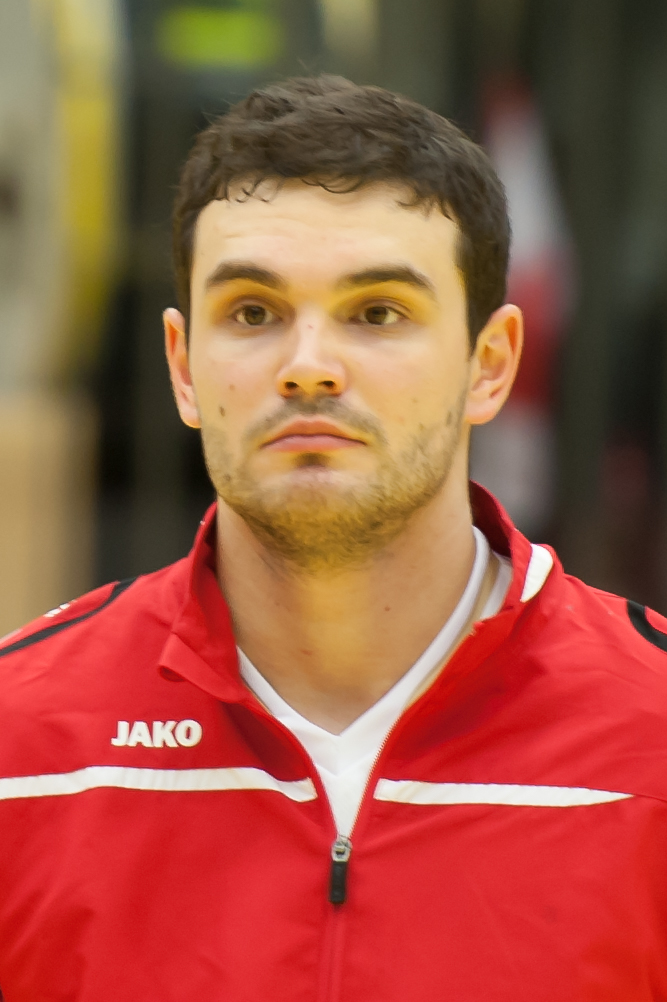
- Svajlen with Switzerland in 2015

Personal information
- Nationality: Swiss
- Born: 12 April 1989 (age 37) Košice, Czechoslovakia
- Height: 1.96 m (6 ft 5 in)

Sport
- Sport: Handball
- Position: Pivot
- Number: 24

Senior clubs
- Years: Team
- 2008-2011: GC Amicitia Zürich
- 2011-2021: Pfadi Winterthur
National team
Years	Team	Apps	(Gls)
2008-?	Switzerland	84	(104)

Teams managed
- 2021-2024: Pfadi Winterthur (assistant/GK coach)

Michal Svajlen (born 12 April 1989) is a Swiss-Slovak handball coach and former player for Pfadi Winterthur and the Swiss national team. His father is the former Slovak national team goalkeeper Ľubomír Švajlen. Michal has both Swiss and Slovak citizenship.

He represented Switzerland at the 2020 European Men's Handball Championship.

He started his career at GC Amicitia Zürich, where he debuted in the 2007-08 season. In November 2011 he joined league rivals Pfadi Winterthur. He retired after winning the 2021 Swiss Championship with Pfadi Winterthur, and became the assistant coach at the club. He left the club in 2024.
