= TVB Stuttgart =

German handball club

TVB 1898 Stuttgart
- Full name: TVB Stuttgart Handball GmbH & Co. KG
- Nickname: Wild Boys
- Short name: TVB
- Founded: 1898; 128 years ago
- Arena: Porsche-Arena
- Capacity: 6,181
- Head coach: Michael Schweikardt
- League: Handball-Bundesliga
- 2025–26: 12th of 18
- Club colours
| Home | Away |

TVB 1898 Stuttgart is a handball club from Waiblingen, town of Bittenfeld, Germany, that plays in the Handball-Bundesliga.

Location of TVB 1898 Stuttgart

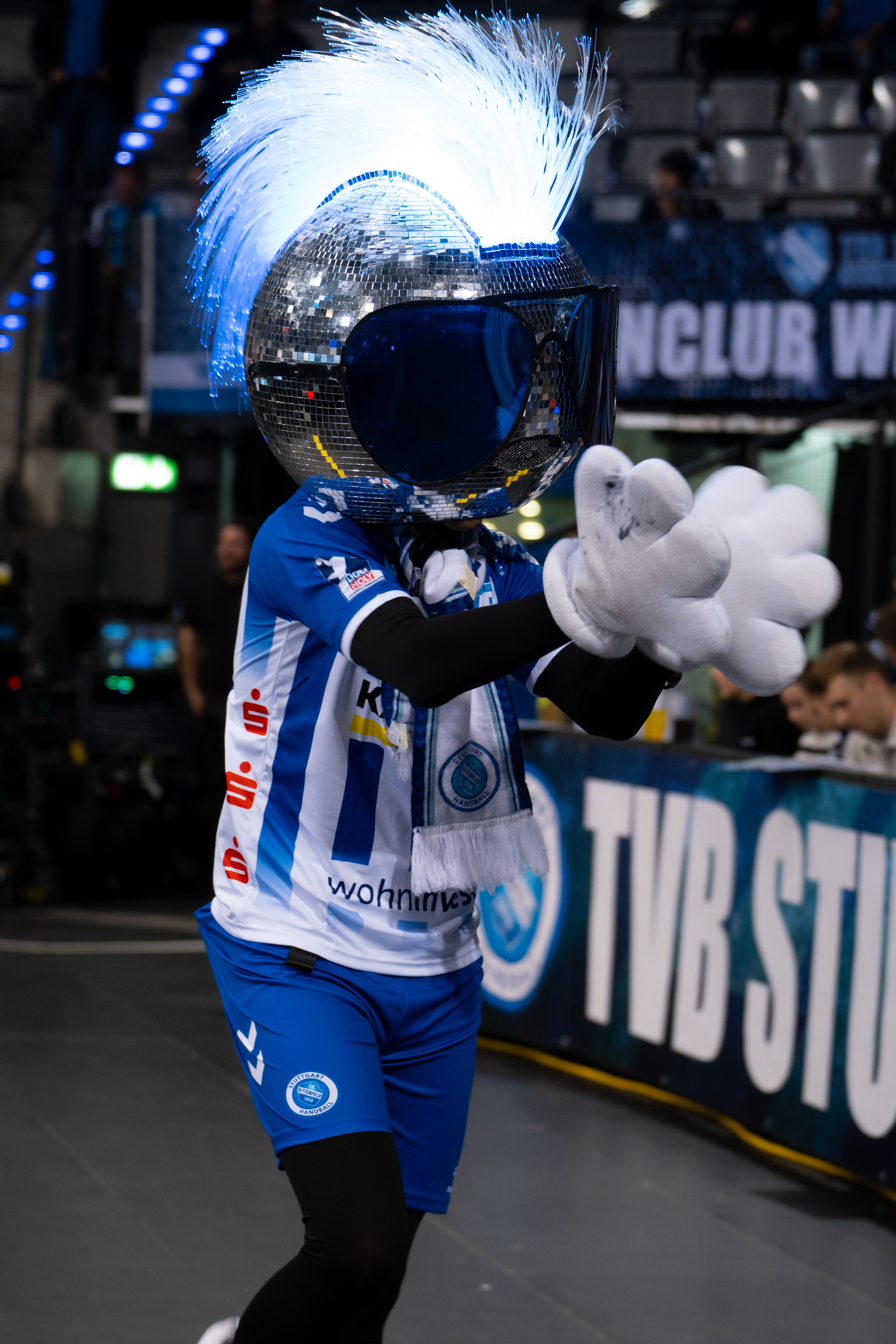
Johnny Blue – the official mascot of TVB Stuttgart.

== History ==
TV Bittenfeld played in the 2nd Division German Handball Championship from the 2006/07 season to the 2014/15 season. After finishing third overall in the 2014/15 season, the team advanced to the 1st division German league and changed its name to TVB 1898 Stuttgart. The team's home matches will be played in Scharrena Stuttgart. Due to the limited capacity of the domestic arena, some matches will be held at the nearby Porsche-Arena. Starting in the 2021/22 season, all matches will be in the Porsche Arena. The club has a local rivalry with HBW Balingen-Weilstetten.

== Crest, colours, supporters ==
=== Club crest ===
Logo in the 2000s
(-2015)

Official logo since 2015
(2015–present)

=== Kits ===
HOME
| 2010–13 | 2015–16 | 2016–17 | 2017–18 | 2018–19 | 2019–20 | 2020–21 | 2021–22 |

AWAY
| 2011–12 | 2019–20 | 2020–21 |

== Sports Hall information ==
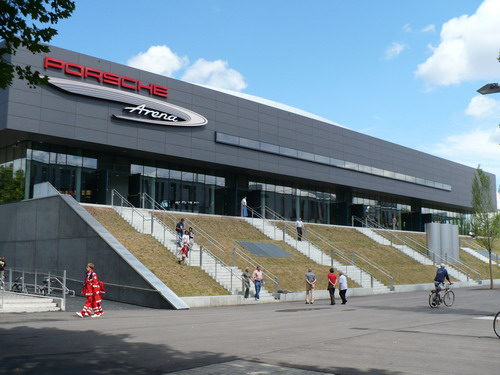
Home hall: Porsche-Arena

- Name: – Porsche-Arena
- City: – Stuttgart
- Capacity: – 6181
- Address: – Mercedesstraße 69, 70372 Stuttgart, Germany

== Team ==
=== Current squad ===
Squad for the 2024–25 season

TVB 1898 Stuttgart

Goalkeepers

- 1 (Serbia) Luka Krivokapić
- 16 (Slovenia) Miljan Vujović
- 21 (Germany) Luca Tschentscher
- 30 (France) Samir Bellahcene

Left wingers

- 6 (Spain) Daniel Fernández
- 7 (Israel) Alon Oberman
- 25 (Germany) Patrick Zieker

Right wingers

- 2 (Germany) Nico Bacani
- 5 (Spain) Jorge Serrano

Line players

- 9 (Croatia) Gianfranco Pribetić
- 17 (Switzerland) Samuel Röthlisberger
- 24 (Switzerland) Lukas Laube

Left backs

- 8 (Germany) Nico Schöttle
- 10 (Lithuania) Jonas Truchanovičius
- 14 (Croatia) Ante Ivanković
- 44 (Switzerland) Lenny Rubin

Centre Backs

- 3 (Germany) Max Häfner
- 11 (Spain) Bruno Reguart
- 22 (Germany) Torben Matzken

Right backs

- 13 (Greece) Achilleas Toskas
- 34 (Germany) Kai Häfner

=== Technical staff ===
- Head coach: (Germany) Michael Schweikardt
- Athletic Trainer: (Germany) Steffen Hepperle
- Physiotherapist: (Germany) Frank Jakschitz
- Physiotherapist: (Germany) Tobias Unfried
- Club doctor: (Germany) Dr. Friedel Mauch

=== Transfers ===
Transfers for the 2026–27 season

Joining

- (Tunisia) Mohamed Darmoul (CB) from (Germany) MT Melsungen
- (Egypt) Mohamed El-Tayar (GK) from (Germany) HSV Hamburg
- (Spain) Darío Sanz (LW) from (Spain) CB Ademar León
- (Germany) Philipp Ahouansou (LB) from (Germany) HSG Wetzlar
- (Germany) Philipp Meyer (LB) from (Germany) ThSV Eisenach
- (Germany) Malte Donker (RB) from (Germany) GWD Minden
- (Serbia) Luka Krivokapić (GK) back from loan at (Spain) BM Granollers

Leaving

- (Spain) Antonio Serradilla (LB) to (Germany) SC Magdeburg
- (Switzerland) Lenny Rubin (LB) to (Switzerland) BSV Bern
- (Slovenia) Miljan Vujović (GK) to (Slovenia) RD Slovan
- (Serbia) Luka Krivokapić (GK) to (Serbia) RK Partizan
- (Lithuania) Jonas Truchanovičius (LB)
- (Croatia) Ivan Šnajder (LW)

=== Transfer History ===
Transfers for the 2025–26 season

Joining

- (Spain) Antonio Serradilla (LB) from (Germany) SC Magdeburg
- (Norway) Kasper Lien (RW) from (Norway) Elverum Håndball
- (Italy) Simone Mengon (CB) from (Germany) ThSV Eisenach
- (Croatia) Ivan Šnajder (LW) from (Germany) ThSV Eisenach
- (Austria) Jakob Nigg (RW) from (Austria) Handballclub Fivers Margareten
- (Netherlands) Jorick Pol (GK) from (Netherlands) Hurry-Up
- (Germany) Daniel Rebmann (GK) from (Germany) SG BBM Bietigheim
- (Poland) Mateusz Kornecki (GK) from (Germany) HBW Balingen-Weilstetten
- (Serbia) Luka Krivokapić (GK) back from loan at (Spain) CB Cangas

Leaving

- (France) Samir Bellahcene (GK) to (Romania) Dinamo București
- (Switzerland) Lukas Laube (LP) to (Germany) THW Kiel
- (Spain) Daniel Fernández (LW) to (Spain) FC Barcelona
- (Spain) Jorge Serrano (RW) to (Spain) Recoletas Atlético Valladolid
- (Spain) Bruno Reguart (CB) to (Spain) BM Granollers
- (Croatia) Ante Ivanković (LB) to (North Macedonia) GRK Ohrid
- (Germany) Nico Schöttle (LB) to (Germany) Bergischer HC
- (Germany) Daniel Rebmann (GK) to (Germany) HBW Balingen-Weilstetten
- (Serbia) Luka Krivokapić (GK) on loan at (Spain) BM Granollers
- (Croatia) Gianfranco Pribetić (LP) to (North Macedonia) GRK Ohrid

== Previous squads ==
2018–2019 Team
| Shirt No | Nationality | Player | Birth Date | Position |
|---|---|---|---|---|
| 1 | Germany | Johannes Bitter | 2 September 1982 (age 44) | Goalkeeper |
| 2 | Germany | Tobias Schimmelbauer | 1 July 1987 (age 39) | Left Winger |
| 3 | Germany | Max Häfner | 13 May 1996 (age 30) | Central Back |
| 6 | Germany | Dominik Weiss | 25 January 1989 (age 37) | Left Back |
| 7 | Netherlands | Bobby Schagen | 13 January 1990 (age 36) | Right Winger |
| 8 | Germany | Michael Schweikardt | 7 March 1983 (age 43) | Left Winger |
| 9 | Germany | Manuel Späth | 16 October 1985 (age 41) | Line Player |
| 10 | Germany | Michael Kraus | 28 September 1983 (age 43) | Central Back |
| 12 | Germany | Jonas Maier | 12 January 1994 (age 32) | Goalkeeper |
| 13 | Croatia | Robert Markotić | 7 March 1990 (age 36) | Right Back |
| 14 | Germany | Simon Baumgarten | 6 September 1985 (age 41) | Line Player |
| 17 | Switzerland | Samuel Röthlisberger | 15 August 1996 (age 30) | Line Player |
| 20 | Germany | Florian Burmeister | 20 April 1997 (age 29) | Left Back |
| 22 | Germany | Nick Lehmann | 5 February 1999 (age 27) | Goalkeeper |
| 24 | Switzerland | Lukas von Deschwanden | 5 June 1989 (age 37) | Central Back |
| 30 | Germany | Sascha Pfattheicher | 28 August 1997 (age 29) | Right Winger |
| 77 | Germany | David Schmidt | 19 October 1993 (age 33) | Right Back |

2015–2016 Team
| Shirt No | Nationality | Player | Birth Date | Position |
|---|---|---|---|---|
| 1 | Croatia | Dragan Jerković | 8 December 1975 (age 50) | Goalkeeper |
| 2 | Germany | Tobias Schimmelbauer | 1 July 1987 (age 39) | Left Winger |
| 3 | Germany | Florian Schöbinger | 5 March 1986 (age 40) | Line Player |
| 4 | Germany | Martin Kienzle | 10 January 1992 (age 34) | Left Winger |
| 6 | Germany | Dominik Weiss | 25 January 1989 (age 37) | Left Back |
| 8 | Germany | Michael Schweikardt | 7 March 1983 (age 43) | Left Winger |
| 9 | Germany | Lars Friedrich | 23 April 1985 (age 41) | Right Back |
| 10 | Denmark | Kasper Kisum | 20 August 1992 (age 34) | Left Back |
| 11 | Germany | Djibril M’Bengue | 13 May 1992 (age 34) | Right Back |
| 12 | Turkey | Yunus Özmusul | 4 February 1989 (age 37) | Goalkeeper |
| 13 | Croatia | Teo Čorić | 25 March 1992 (age 34) | Line Player |
| 14 | Germany | Simon Baumgarten | 6 September 1985 (age 41) | Line Player |
| 15 | Romania | Viorel Fotache | 15 May 1989 (age 37) | Left Back |
| 16 | Germany | Sebastian Arnold | 15 August 1996 (age 30) | Goalkeeper |
| 21 | Germany | Michael Seiz | 23 March 1993 (age 33) | Right Winger |
| 23 | Germany | Alexander Heib | 12 June 1987 (age 39) | Central Back |
| 24 | Germany | Finn Kretschmer | 2 June 1994 (age 32) | Right Winger |
| 25 | Iran | Sajjad Esteki | 23 April 1990 (age 36) | Left Back |
| 26 | Germany | Michael Spatz | 25 November 1982 (age 43) | Right Winger |

== Former club members ==
=== Notable former players ===
- (Germany) Jens Bechtloff (2003–2007)
- (Germany) Johannes Bitter (2016–2021)
- (Germany) Kai Häfner (2006–2007)
- (Germany) Michael Kraus (2016–2019)
- (Germany) Djibril M’Bengue (2013–2018)
- (Germany) Jürgen Müller (2006, 2012–2015)
- (Germany) David Schmidt (2018–2020)
- (Germany) Manuel Späth (2017–2020)
- (Germany) Michael Spatz (2015–2016)
- (Germany) Dominik Weiss (2009–2022)
- (Germany) Christian Zeitz (2020)
- (Germany) Patrick Zieker (2019–)
- (Croatia) Teo Čorić (2015–2017)
- (Croatia) Dragan Jerković (2013–2017)
- (Croatia) Robert Markotić (2018–2020)
- (Croatia) Ivan Pešić (2021–2022)
- (Czech Republic) Jan Větrovec (2006–2008)
- (Denmark) Kasper Kisum (2015–2016)
- (Finland) Richard Sundberg (2014–2015)
- (Hungary) Rudolf Faluvégi (2019–2021)
- (Hungary) Egon Hanusz (2021–)
- (Iran) Sajjad Esteki (2015)
- (Iceland) Elvar Ásgeirsson (2019–2021)
- (Iceland) Arnór Þór Gunnarsson (2010–2012)
- (Iceland) Björgvin Páll Gústavsson (2007–2009)
- (Iceland) Viggó Kristjánsson (2020–2022)
- (Iceland) Árni Þór Sigtryggsson (2007–2009)
- (North Macedonia) Žarko Peševski (2019–2022)
- (Netherlands) Bobby Schagen (2016–2019)
- (Poland) (Germany) Dennis Szczęsny (2012–2014)
- (Romania) Viorel Fotache (2015–2017)
- (Romania) (Germany) Dragoș Oprea (2016)
- (Slovenia) Gregor Lorger (2011–2012)
- (Slovenia) Primož Prošt (2020–2022)
- (Slovenia) Miljan Vujović (2022–)
- (Switzerland) Lukas von Deschwanden (2018–2019)
- (Switzerland) Samuel Röthlisberger (2017–)
- (Sweden) Oscar Bergendahl (2022–)
- (Sweden) Patrik Kvalvik (2014–2015)
- (Sweden) Adam Lönn (2019–)
- (Sweden) Tobias Thulin (2021–2022)
- (Turkey) Can Çelebi (2016–2017)
- (Turkey) Yunus Özmusul (2015–2016)

=== Former coaches ===
| Seasons | Coach | Country |
|---|---|---|
| 1973–2007 | Günter Schweikardt | (Germany) |
| 2007–2008 | Henning Fröschle | (Germany) |
| 2008 | Jens Baumbach | (Germany) |
| 2008–2013 | Günter Schweikardt | (Germany) |
| 2013 | Heiko Burmeister | (Germany) |
| 2013–2015 | Jürgen Schweikardt | (Germany) |
| 2015–2016 | Thomas König | (Germany) |
| 2016–2018 | Markus Baur | (Germany) |
| 2018–2021 | Jürgen Schweikardt | (Germany) |
| 2021–2022 | Roi Sánchez | (Spain) |
| 2022–2025 | Michael Schweikardt | (Germany) |
| 2025 | Misha Kaufmann | (Switzerland) |
