= Robert Kostadinovich =

Swiss handball player

Personal information
- Nationality: Switzerland
- Born: 7 September 1973 (age 53)
- Height: 188 cm (74 in)

Sport
- Sport: Handball

Senior clubs
- Years: Team
- 1987-2006: ZMC Amicitia
National team
Years	Team	Apps	(Gls)
1993-2006	Switzerland	181	(771)

Robert (Robbie) Kostadinovich (born 7 September 1973) is a Swiss male handball player. He was a member of the Switzerland men's national handball team. He was part of the team at the 1996 Summer Olympics, playing five matches. On club level he played for TV Suhr and ZMC Amicitia.
