= Kadetten Schaffhausen =

Swiss handball club

- Full name: Kadetten Schaffhausen
- Short name: Kadetten
- Founded: 1791; 235 years ago
- Arena: BBC Arena
- Capacity: 3,500
- President: Giorgio Behr
- Head coach: Jonas Wille
- League: Quickline Handball League
- 2025-26: 1st
- Club colours
Home	Away

Kadetten Schaffhausen is a Swiss professional handball team located in Schaffhausen. Their home matches are played at the BBC Arena.

Kadetten Schaffhausen compete in the national Swiss Handball League and won the title 15 times (2005, 2006, 2007, 2010, 2011, 2012, 2014, 2015, 2016, 2017, 2019, 2022, 2023, 2024, 2025).

Kadetten won the Swiss Men's Handball Cup 11 times (1999, 2004, 2005, 2007, 2008, 2011, 2014, 2016, 2021, 2024, 2026) and the Swiss Super cup 16 times (2004, 2005, 2006, 2007, 2010, 2011, 2012, 2013, 2014, 2015, 2016, 2017, 2019, 2022, 2023, 2024).

In 2010, Kadetten reached the 2009–10 EHF Cup final, but lost to TBV Lemgo. In the 2016-17 season, they played in the EHF Champions League group stage. In 2021, 2022, 2023 and 2024, they reached the quarter finals or round of 16 in the EHF European League.

== History ==
The history of Kadetten Schaffhausen goes back to 1791. From the 18th century, various local clubs, called Kadettenkorps, used to prepare high-school students for military service in the Swiss militia.

In the early days, Kadetten played field handball. Only in 1966, they joined the indoor competition. In 1988, Kadetten were promoted to the 1st Swiss division. In 1999, Kadetten Schaffhausen won the Swiss Men's Handball Cup for the first time and in 2005 the first Swiss Handball League championship.

Since 2011, Kadetten Schaffhausen has operated the Suisse Handball Academy at the BBC Arena in Schaffhausen. It serves as Switzerland’s official national performance center for men’s handball. The academy offers a state-of-the-art infrastructure and accommodation under one roof.

== Team 2025/26 ==
No.	Nationality	Name	Position	Birth date	Height	Since
1	Croatia	Moreno Car	GK	22.04.1996	188	2025
2	Switzerland	Lucas Meister	LP	16.08.1996	197	2024
3	Switzerland	Yari Prince	LW	23.01.2006	190	
4	Germany	Lukas Saueressig	CB	09.06.1997	192	2025
5	Austria	Leon Bergmann	GK	17.04.2004	196	2025
6	Iceland	Óðinn Þór Ríkharðsson	RW	23.10.1997	183	2022
7	Switzerland	Manoy Ugiagbe	LB	10.01.2006	185	2024
8	Czech Republic	David Hrachovec	RW	01.08.2003	187	2023
9	Switzerland	Dimitrij Küttel	RB	18.02.1994	191	2025
10	Bosnia and Herzegovina	Josip Perić	CB	05.06.1992	180	2025
13	Spain	Juan Castro Álvarez	CB	31.10.1990	190	2024
15	Switzerland	Marvin Lier	LW	08.09.1992	185	2021
18	Poland	Ariel Pietrasik	LB	20.10.1999	202	2023
19	Switzerland	Zoran Markovic	LB	06.05.1995	197	2010
20	Switzerland	Luka Maros	LB	20.03.1994	196	2015
21	Czech Republic	Daniel Režnický	LP	26.03.1998	190	2025
22	Croatia	Patrik Martinović	RB	29.08.2000	188	2024
	Croatia	Hrvoje Horvat	Coach	16.12.1977	191	2023

=== Transfers ===
Transfers for the 2026–27 season

Joining

- (Denmark) Frederik Tilsted (CB) from (Denmark) SønderjyskE Herrehåndbold
- (Switzerland) Mathieu Seravalli (GK) from (Switzerland) BSV Bern
- (Switzerland) Nikos Sarlos (LW) from (Switzerland) HSC Suhr Aarau

Leaving

- (Croatia) Moreno Car (GK) to (Switzerland) HC Kriens-Luzern
- (Spain) Juan Castro Álvarez (CB) to (Spain) CB Ademar León
- (Switzerland) David Hrachovec (RW) to (Switzerland) HSC Suhr Aarau
- (Switzerland) Manoy Ugiagbe (LB) to (Switzerland) HSC Suhr Aarau

=== Transfer History ===
Transfers for the 2025–26 season

Joining

- (Bosnia and Herzegovina) Josip Peric (CB) from (Greece) Olympiacos
- (Austria) Leon Bergmann (GK) from (Austria) Handballclub Fivers Margareten
- (Czech Republic) Daniel Režnický (LP) from (Poland) KPR Ostrovia
- (Germany) Lukas Saueressig (LB) from (Switzerland) HSC Kreuzlingen
- (Switzerland) Dimitrij Küttel (RB) from (Switzerland) HC Kriens-Luzern
- (Croatia) Moreno Car (GK) from (Croatia) RK Poreč

Leaving

- (France) Julien Meyer (GK) to (France) C' Chartres MHB
- (Sweden) Kassem Awad (LP) to (Denmark) HØJ Elite
- (Hungary) Donát Bartók (RB) (retires)
- (Switzerland) Mehdi Ben Romdhane (CB) to (Switzerland) Pfadi Winterthur
- (Croatia) Kristian Pilipović (GK) to (North Macedonia) GRK Ohrid

== Notable former players ==
- (Austria) Lukas Herburger
- (Germany) Christian Dissinger
- (Iceland) Björgvin Páll Gústavsson
- (Hungary) Gábor Császár
- (Estonia) Mait Patrail
- (Czech Republic) Jan Filip
- (Serbia) Uroš Elezović
- (Serbia) (Hungary) Nenad Puljezević
- (Serbia) Aleksandar Stojanović
- (Serbia) Bojan Beljanski
- (Poland) Michał Szyba
- (Croatia) Marko Mamić
- (Croatia) Sandro Obranović
- (Greece) Savvas Karypidis
- (Norway) Stian Vatne
- (Switzerland) Nikola Portner
- (Spain) Joan Cañellas
