= Stefan Schärer =

Swiss handball player

Personal information
- Nationality: Swiss
- Born: 26 January 1965 (age 60)

Sport
- Sport: Handball

Stefan Schärer (born 26 January 1965) is a Swiss handball player. He competed in the men's tournament at the 1996 Summer Olympics.
