= Cadets de Gascogne =

French regiment under King Louis XIII

The Cadets de Gascogne, in English the Captains of Gascony, were a French regiment under King Louis XIII. The regiment was mainly recruited from the youngest sons of the aristocratic families of Gascony. The word cadet comes from the Occitan-Gascon capdèth, meaning chief or captain. Nowadays, the word cadet is used in French as an equivalent of younger son.

The regiment was apparently considered romantic and swashbuckling, so it appealed to authors; it was used in both Cyrano de Bergerac and the original Three Musketeers by Dumas.

Famous members of the regiment included:

- Savinien Cyrano de Bergerac
- Antonin Nompar de Caumont
- Jean Louis de Nogaret de La Valette

The regiment was not maintained under Louis XIV.
