= Handball Grauholz =

Swiss handball club

SG Grauholz Emme
- Full name: SG Grauholz Emme
- Founded: 2001; 25 years ago
- Arena: Geisshubel
- Capacity: 300
- President: Peter Kofel
- Head coach: Peter Kofel
- League: Männer 3. Liga

Handball Grauholz is a Swiss Handball club from Bern.

It was founded in 2001 between three original clubs: 1) TV Zollikofen, 2) HBC Moosseedorf and 3) HGTV Münchenbuchsee.

During the seasons of 2005 and 2008, the club reached promotion to the NLB.

In the seasons 2004 and 2005, the club reached the 1/8 in the final of the Swiss cup.

== Club ==
=== Information ===
Name:	Handball Grauholz
Teams:	19
Members:	849
whereof	100	Activ members
	150	Juniors
	19	Honorary members
	100	Passiv members
	450	Sponsors/Donators
	30	Fritig's Club Moosseedorf

=== Teams ===
3	Men teams	NLB, 2. Liga, 3. Liga
2	Women teams	2x 2. Liga
3	Senior Teams	Free Mode
1	Juniors m U19	Regional
1	Juniors m U17	Regional
2	Juniors m U15	Regional
1	Juniors f U15	Regional
3	Junioren m/f U13	Regional
3	Junioren m/f U11/U9	Regional

== 1. Team ==
=== Squad Season 08/09 ===
(Date: September 11. 2008)

##	Schweiz	Weber Andreas	Goalkeeper
##	Schweiz	Baillif Christoph	Goalkeeper
##	Schweiz	Brechbühl Alain	Left winger
##	Schweiz	Graf Bruno	Right winger
##	Schweiz	Grossenbacher Stefan	Left winger
##	Schweiz	Hubacher Samuel	Playmaker
##	Schweiz	Hutmacher Pascal	Right back
##	Schweiz	Oltmanns Philipp	Playmaker
##	Schweiz	Othman Rahim	Circle runner
##	Schweiz	Reverdin Christoph	Circle runner
##	Schweiz	Rosser Philipp	Left back
##	Schweiz	Sieber Sandro	Left winger
##	Schweiz	Stebler Urs	Left back
##	Schweiz	Wegelin Philipp	Playmaker
##	Schweiz	Weingart Nicolas	Left back
##	Schweiz	Zehnder Jonas	Right back

=== Schedule Championship NLB 08/09 ===
07.09.08	16:30	TV Endingen	-	Handball Grauholz
13.09.08	17:30	Handball Grauholz	-	HC Horgen
23.09.08	20:15	HS Biel	-	Handball Grauholz
27.09.08	17:00	Yellow Winterthur	-	Handball Grauholz
05.10.08	19:00	HC KTV Altdorf	-	Handball Grauholz
11.10.08	17:30	Handball Grauholz	-	TV Dagmersellen 1
18.10.08	20:00	SG Kadetten GS Schaffhausen	-	Handball Grauholz
21.10.08	20:30	Handball Grauholz	-	PSG Lyss
08.11.08	17:30	TV Steffisburg	-	Handball Grauholz
15.11.08	17:30	Handball Grauholz	-	BSV Stans
23.11.08	16:00	HC Dietikon-Urdorf	-	Handball Grauholz
06.12.08	17:30	Handball Grauholz	-	TV Endingen
13.12.08	18:00	HC Horgen	-	Handball Grauholz
20.12.08	16:00	Handball Grauholz	-	HS Biel
31.01.09	19:00	TV Dagmersellen 1	-	Handball Grauholz
07.02.09	17:30	Handball Grauholz	-	Yellow Winterthur
14.02.09	17:30	Handball Grauholz	-	HC KTV Altdorf
28.02.09	17:30	Handball Grauholz	-	SG Kadetten GS Schaffhausen
07.03.09	17:00	PSG Lyss	-	Handball Grauholz
14.03.09	17:30	Handball Grauholz	-	TV Steffisburg
28.03.09	19:30	BSV Stans	-	Handball Grauholz
04.04.09	17:30	Handball Grauholz	-	HC Dietikon-Urdorf

== Former Players Now Playing SHL ==
Schweiz	Caspar Roman	Wacker Thun
Schweiz	Reber Manuel	Wacker Thun
Schweiz	Milovanovic Alexander	RTV 1879 Basel
Schweiz	Burri Philipp	ZMC Amicitia Zürich
Schweiz	Stalder Tobias	RTV 1879 Basel
