= Max Schär =

Swiss handball player (born 1953)

Personal information
- Nationality: Switzerland
- Born: 12 June 1953 Zofingen, Switzerland
- Height: 197 cm (78 in)

Sport
- Sport: Handball
- Position: Right back

Senior clubs
- Years: Team
- –: RTV 1879 Basel
National team
Years	Team	Apps	(Gls)
1973 - 1986	Switzerland	279	(724)

Max Schär (born 12 June 1953) is a Swiss handball player. He was a member of the Switzerland men's national handball team. He was part of the team at the 1980 Summer Olympics and 1984 Summer Olympics. On club level he played for RTV 1879 Basel in Switzerland. Between 2006 and 2009 he was the director at the Swiss Handball Association.

He holds the record for most caps on the Swiss national team.
