= HC Kriens-Luzern =

Swiss handball club

- Full name: Handballclub Kriens
- Short name: Kriens
- Founded: 1966; 60 years ago
- Arena: Pilatus Arena
- Capacity: 4,060
- Head coach: Peter Kukučka
- League: Quickline Handball League
- 2022-23: 2nd
- Club colours
Home	Away

HC Kriens-Luzern is a Swiss handball team located in Kriens, Luzern. Their home matches are played in the Pilatus Arena which has a capacity of 4,060. They compete in the Swiss First League of Handball. In 2023 they won their first title, the Swiss Cup.

Location of HC Kriens-Luzern

== Honours ==
- Swiss Handball League:
  - Runner-ups: 2023
- Swiss Cup:
  - Winners: 2023

== Sports Hall information ==
- Arena: – Pilatus Arena
- City: – Kriens
- Capacity: – 4060
- Address: – Am Mattenhof 3, 6010 Kriens

== Team ==
=== Current squad ===
Squad for the 2023–24 season

Goalkeepers

- 12 (Switzerland) Fabian Pellegrini
- 16 (France) Kevin Bonnefoi
- 61 (Tunisia) Yassine Belkaied

Left Wingers

- 21 (Switzerland) Ramon Schlumpf
- 27 (Switzerland) On Langenick

Right Wingers

- 14 (Switzerland) Gino Steenaerts
- 57 (Switzerland) Ammar Idrizi

Pivot

- 22 (Croatia) Marin Šipić
- 23 (Switzerland) Gino Delchiappo
- 28 (Croatia) Željko Musa
- 41 (Switzerland) Nils Flückiger

Left Backs

- 11 (Montenegro) Radojica Čepić
- 20 (Germany) Fabian Böhm

Central Backs

- 8 (Switzerland) Luca Sigrist
- 9 (Switzerland) Valentin Wolfisberg
- 15 (Switzerland) Moritz Oertli
- 25 (Switzerland) Jonas Schelker

Right Backs

- 6 (Switzerland) Dimitrij Küttel
- 10 (Serbia) Miloš Orbović

=== Transfers ===
Transfers for the 2026–27 season

Joining

- (Austria) Nikola Bilyk (LB) from (Germany) THW Kiel
- (Austria) Lukas Herburger (LP) from (Germany) Füchse Berlin
- (Croatia) Kristian Pilipović (GK) from (North Macedonia) GRK Ohrid
- (Croatia) Moreno Car (GK) from (Switzerland) Kadetten Schaffhausen
- (Germany) Justin Müller (CB) from (Germany) HSG Wetzlar

Leaving

- (France) Kevin Bonnefoi (GK) to (France) Tremblay Handball
- (Montenegro) Radojica Čepić (LB) to (Hungary) Győri ETO-UNI FKC
- (Serbia) Miloš Orbović (RB) to (France) Saran Loiret Handball
- (Switzerland) Luca Sigrist (CB) to (Germany) MT Melsungen
- (Switzerland) Jannis Scheidiger (GK) on loan at (Switzerland) HSC Suhr Aarau

=== Transfer History ===
Transfers for the 2025–26 season

Joining

- (Serbia) Marko Milosavljević (LB) from (France) HBC Nantes
- (Germany) Jerome Müller (RB) from (Germany) HBW Balingen-Weilstetten
- (Switzerland) Jannis Scheidiger (GK) from (Switzerland) HSC Suhr Aarau
- (Switzerland) Marc Bader (LP) from (Switzerland) GC Amicitia Zürich
- (Switzerland) Wyatt Aellen (RW) from (Switzerland) Handball Emmen

Leaving

- (Switzerland) Gino Steenaerts (RW) to (Germany) Rhein-Neckar Löwen

== Notable former players ==
- (Switzerland) Andy Schmid
- (Switzerland) Carlos Lima
- (Switzerland) Nicolas Raemy
- (Switzerland) Nik Tominec
- (Serbia) Bojan Beljanski
- (Belarus) Hleb Harbuz
