= Kadetten =

Swiss youth organization

The Kadetten Verband is a Swiss youth organization. Kadetten is German for "cadets"; from the 19th (in some places the 18th) to the early-20th century, various local clubs, called Kadettenkorps, used to prepare high-school students for military service in the Swiss militia. The modern youth organization has branched out into many things including sports (such as the national league handball club Kadetten Schaffhausen), trekking (Boy Scouts-style branch), marching bands (Kadettenmusik), and traffic regulation ("Verkehrskadetten").
