= 2006 European Men's Handball Championship =

2006 edition of the European Men's Handball Championship

2006 EHF European Men's Handball Championship
Handball-Europameisterschaft 2006 (in German) Championnat d'Europe de handball 2006 (in French) Campionato europeo di pallamano 2006 (in Italian)
- Logo of the EC 2006

Tournament details
- Host country: Switzerland
- Venues: 5 (in 5 host cities)
- Dates: 26 January – 5 February
- Teams: 16 (from 1 confederation)

Final positions
- Champions: France (1st title)
- Runners-up: Spain
- Third place: Denmark
- Fourth place: Croatia

Tournament statistics
- Matches played: 47
- Goals scored: 2,784 (59.23 per match)
- Attendance: 182,600 (3,885 per match)
- Top scorers: (Slovenia) Siarhei Rutenka (51 goals)

Awards
- Best player: (Croatia) Ivano Balić

The 2006 EHF European Men's Handball Championship was the seventh edition of the tournament and held in Switzerland from 26 January to 5 February 2006, in the cities of Basel, Bern, Lucerne, St. Gallen and Zürich. France won the tournament, going through unbeaten after an early defeat to Spain. France's defence conceded the fewest goals per game in the entire tournament, with 192 conceded goals in eight matches. The hosts Switzerland were knocked out at the first group stage, while Denmark finished third and Croatia fourth to qualify directly for the 2007 World Championship, along with France.

== Qualification ==
Country	Qualified as	Previous appearances in tournament
Switzerland	Host	2 (2002, 2004)
Croatia	Semifinalist of 2004 European Championship	6 (1994, 1996, 1998, 2000, 2002, 2004)
Denmark	Semifinalist of 2004 European Championship	5 (1994, 1996, 2000, 2002, 2004)
Germany	Semifinalist of 2004 European Championship	6 (1994, 1996, 1998, 2000, 2002, **2004**)
Slovenia	Semifinalist of 2004 European Championship	5 (1994, 1996, 2000, 2002, 2004)
Russia	Fifth place of 2004 European Championship	6 (1994, **1996**, 1998, 2000, 2002, 2004)
France	Playoff winner	6 (1994, 1996, 1998, 2000, 2002, 2004)
Hungary	Playoff winner	4 (1994, 1996, 1998, 2004)
Iceland	Playoff winner	3 (2000, 2002, 2004)
Norway	Playoff winner	1 (2000)
Poland	Playoff winner	2 (2002, 2004)
Portugal	Playoff winner	4 (1994, 2000, 2002, 2004)
Serbia and Montenegro	Playoff winner	4 (1996, 1998, 2002, 2004)
Slovakia	Playoff winner	0 (Debut)
Spain	Playoff winner	6 (1994, 1996, 1998, 2000, 2002, 2004)
Ukraine	Playoff winner	3 (2000, 2002, 2004)

Note: Bold indicates champion for that year. Italic indicates host for that year.

== Preliminary round ==
=== Group A ===
This group was played in the Kreuzbleichhalle, St. Gallen (capacity: 4,500). Poland qualified first, winning the first match and then drawing the second against Switzerland despite an equaliser with 15 seconds to go, and two hours later they were joined by Slovenia, who came back from a two-goal deficit in the last ten minutes to beat Ukraine by 33–31. Switzerland and Ukraine thus played off for the last place in the main round, and the Swiss got behind from the start, trailing by 21–14 at half time. Ten minutes into the second half, Ukraine were 28–16 up, before allowing Switzerland somewhat back into it near the end. They still won 37–30, however, qualifying for the second round with zero points. Slovenia beat Poland 33–29 to carry forward four points, while Poland got two.

Pos	Team	Pld	W	D	L	GF	GA	GD	Pts
1	Slovenia	3	3	0	0	95	85	+10	6
2	Poland	3	1	1	1	93	88	+5	3
3	Ukraine	3	1	0	2	92	96	−4	2
4	Switzerland (H)	3	0	1	2	86	97	−11	1

Source: EHF
(H) Hosts

26 January 2006; 17:30	Poland	33–24	Ukraine	Kreuzbleichhalle, St. Gallen; Attendance: 3,000; Referees: Višekruna, Stanojević (SRB)
26 January 2006; 17:30	Bielecki 8	(19–13)	Shelmenko, Stetsyura 7	Kreuzbleichhalle, St. Gallen; Attendance: 3,000; Referees: Višekruna, Stanojević (SRB)
26 January 2006; 17:30	3× (yellow card) 2× (suspension)	Report	3× (yellow card) 1× (suspension)	Kreuzbleichhalle, St. Gallen; Attendance: 3,000; Referees: Višekruna, Stanojević (SRB)

26 January 2006; 20:15	Slovenia	29–25	Switzerland	Kreuzbleichhalle, St. Gallen; Attendance: 3,500; Referees: Kékes, Kékes (HUN)
26 January 2006; 20:15	Rutenka 7	(16–13)	Gautschi 7	Kreuzbleichhalle, St. Gallen; Attendance: 3,500; Referees: Kékes, Kékes (HUN)
26 January 2006; 20:15	3× (yellow card) 4× (suspension)	Report	2× (yellow card) 4× (suspension)	Kreuzbleichhalle, St. Gallen; Attendance: 3,500; Referees: Kékes, Kékes (HUN)

28 January 2006; 16:15	Switzerland	31–31	Poland	Kreuzbleichhalle, St. Gallen; Attendance: 3,500; Referees: Arnaldsson, Viðarsson (ISL)
28 January 2006; 16:15	Engeler 9	(16–17)	Obrusiewicz 6	Kreuzbleichhalle, St. Gallen; Attendance: 3,500; Referees: Arnaldsson, Viðarsson (ISL)
28 January 2006; 16:15	4× (yellow card) 3× (suspension)	Report	3× (yellow card) 4× (suspension)	Kreuzbleichhalle, St. Gallen; Attendance: 3,500; Referees: Arnaldsson, Viðarsson (ISL)

28 January 2006; 18:30	Ukraine	31–33	Slovenia	Kreuzbleichhalle, St. Gallen; Attendance: 2,800; Referees: Dolejš, Kohout (CZE)
28 January 2006; 18:30	Prudius 7	(17–16)	Rutenka 9	Kreuzbleichhalle, St. Gallen; Attendance: 2,800; Referees: Dolejš, Kohout (CZE)
28 January 2006; 18:30	3× (yellow card) 11× (suspension) 1× (red card)	Report	3× (yellow card) 8× (suspension)	Kreuzbleichhalle, St. Gallen; Attendance: 2,800; Referees: Dolejš, Kohout (CZE)

29 January 2006; 14:00	Slovenia	33–29	Poland	Kreuzbleichhalle, St. Gallen; Attendance: 2,800; Referees: Hansson, Olsson (SWE)
29 January 2006; 14:00	Rutenka 10	(16–10)	Bielecki 9	Kreuzbleichhalle, St. Gallen; Attendance: 2,800; Referees: Hansson, Olsson (SWE)
29 January 2006; 14:00	3× (yellow card) 6× (suspension)	Report	2× (yellow card) 6× (suspension)	Kreuzbleichhalle, St. Gallen; Attendance: 2,800; Referees: Hansson, Olsson (SWE)

29 January 2006; 16:15	Switzerland	30–37	Ukraine	Kreuzbleichhalle, St. Gallen; Attendance: 3,500; Referees: Laursen, Nielsen (DEN)
29 January 2006; 16:15	Engeler, Kurth 6	(14–21)	three players 7	Kreuzbleichhalle, St. Gallen; Attendance: 3,500; Referees: Laursen, Nielsen (DEN)
29 January 2006; 16:15	3× (yellow card) 3× (suspension)	Report	3× (yellow card) 4× (suspension)	Kreuzbleichhalle, St. Gallen; Attendance: 3,500; Referees: Laursen, Nielsen (DEN)

=== Group B ===
The matches in this group were played in St. Jakobshalle, Basel (capacity 8,500). Germany became the first team to qualify, drawing their first match with Spain before overcoming Slovakia (who ended up by conceding 100 goals, the most in the group stage) in their second game. Spain followed soon after, beating France by 29–26 after a 17–9 lead at half time, but the French were also through as they would be ahead of Slovakia on head-to-head if the two were to end on two points each. Thus, their last match with Germany only determined how many points they would carry forward to the main round; France risked going through with nil, but after prevailing 27–25 they finished the group in second place and took two points.

Pos	Team	Pld	W	D	L	GF	GA	GD	Pts
1	Spain	3	2	1	0	94	82	+12	5
2	France	3	2	0	1	88	75	+13	4
3	Germany	3	1	1	1	87	84	+3	3
4	Slovakia	3	0	0	3	72	100	−28	0

Source: EHF

26 January 2006; 15:45	Germany	31–31	Spain	St. Jakobshalle, Basel; Attendance: 5,900; Referees: Laursen, Nielsen (DEN)
26 January 2006; 15:45	Hens 9	(16–15)	three players 6	St. Jakobshalle, Basel; Attendance: 5,900; Referees: Laursen, Nielsen (DEN)
26 January 2006; 15:45	4× (yellow card) 5× (suspension)	Report	2× (yellow card) 2× (suspension)	St. Jakobshalle, Basel; Attendance: 5,900; Referees: Laursen, Nielsen (DEN)

26 January 2006; 18:00	France	35–21	Slovakia	St. Jakobshalle, Basel; Attendance: 4,800; Referees: Arnaldsson, Viðarsson (ISL)
26 January 2006; 18:00	Abati 6	(19–9)	three players	St. Jakobshalle, Basel; Attendance: 4,800; Referees: Arnaldsson, Viðarsson (ISL)
26 January 2006; 18:00	3× (yellow card) 2× (suspension)	Report	3× (yellow card) 4× (suspension)	St. Jakobshalle, Basel; Attendance: 4,800; Referees: Arnaldsson, Viðarsson (ISL)

28 January 2006; 14:00	Slovakia	26–31	Germany	St. Jakobshalle, Basel; Attendance: 6,300; Referees: Višekruna, Stanojević (SRB)
28 January 2006; 14:00	Antl 6	(15–18)	Klimovets 7	St. Jakobshalle, Basel; Attendance: 6,300; Referees: Višekruna, Stanojević (SRB)
28 January 2006; 14:00	3× (yellow card) 3× (suspension)	Report	3× (yellow card) 6× (suspension)	St. Jakobshalle, Basel; Attendance: 6,300; Referees: Višekruna, Stanojević (SRB)

28 January 2006; 16:15	Spain	29–26	France	St. Jakobshalle, Basel; Attendance: 5,900; Referees: Kékes, Kékes (HUN)
28 January 2006; 16:15	Romero 10	(17–9)	Karabatić 10	St. Jakobshalle, Basel; Attendance: 5,900; Referees: Kékes, Kékes (HUN)
28 January 2006; 16:15	3× (yellow card) 3× (suspension)	Report	4× (yellow card) 2× (suspension)	St. Jakobshalle, Basel; Attendance: 5,900; Referees: Kékes, Kékes (HUN)

29 January 2006; 15:15	Germany	25–27	France	St. Jakobshalle, Basel; Attendance: 6,600; Referees: Dolejš, Kohout (CZE)
29 January 2006; 15:15	Klimovets 6	(11–13)	Guigou 6	St. Jakobshalle, Basel; Attendance: 6,600; Referees: Dolejš, Kohout (CZE)
29 January 2006; 15:15	2× (yellow card) 4× (suspension)	Report	3× (yellow card) 4× (suspension)	St. Jakobshalle, Basel; Attendance: 6,600; Referees: Dolejš, Kohout (CZE)

29 January 2006; 17:30	Spain	34–25	Slovakia	St. Jakobshalle, Basel; Attendance: 5,450; Referees: Reisinger, Kaschütz (AUT)
29 January 2006; 17:30	Garabaya 8	(15–10)	Straňovský 9	St. Jakobshalle, Basel; Attendance: 5,450; Referees: Reisinger, Kaschütz (AUT)
29 January 2006; 17:30	2× (yellow card) 5× (suspension) 1× (red card)	Report	3× (yellow card) 6× (suspension)	St. Jakobshalle, Basel; Attendance: 5,450; Referees: Reisinger, Kaschütz (AUT)

=== Group C ===
The matches in this group were held in the Sursee Stadthalle in Sursee/Lucerne. Denmark and Iceland opened with wins, and with a draw in the second round both teams qualified for the main round. Serbia and Montenegro joined them due to the head-to-head encounter rule; despite finishing level on points with Hungary after losing to Denmark in the last match, Serbia and Montenegro had beaten Hungary and thus finished ahead. Iceland lost their last match, but nevertheless carried through three points to the main round, as did Denmark.

Pos	Team	Pld	W	D	L	GF	GA	GD	Pts
1	Denmark	3	2	1	0	90	82	+8	5
2	Iceland	3	1	1	1	95	94	+1	3
3	Serbia and Montenegro	3	1	0	2	89	93	−4	2
4	Hungary	3	1	0	2	84	89	−5	2

Source: EHF

26 January 2006; 18:00	Serbia and Montenegro	31–36	Iceland	Stadthalle, Sursee; Attendance: 2,500; Referees: Falcone, Rätz (SUI)
26 January 2006; 18:00	Krivokapić 7	(11–16)	Sigurðsson 10	Stadthalle, Sursee; Attendance: 2,500; Referees: Falcone, Rätz (SUI)
26 January 2006; 18:00	4× (yellow card) 9× (suspension)	Report	3× (yellow card) 6× (suspension)	Stadthalle, Sursee; Attendance: 2,500; Referees: Falcone, Rätz (SUI)

26 January 2006; 20:15	Denmark	29–25	Hungary	Stadthalle, Sursee; Attendance: 2,500; Referees: Vakula, Ljudovik (UKR)
26 January 2006; 20:15	Boldsen 6	(12–8)	Buday 9	Stadthalle, Sursee; Attendance: 2,500; Referees: Vakula, Ljudovik (UKR)
26 January 2006; 20:15	3× (yellow card) 5× (suspension)	Report	3× (yellow card) 3× (suspension)	Stadthalle, Sursee; Attendance: 2,500; Referees: Vakula, Ljudovik (UKR)

27 January 2006; 18:00	Hungary	24–29	Serbia and Montenegro	Stadthalle, Sursee; Attendance: 2,500; Referees: Hansson, Olsson (SWE)
27 January 2006; 18:00	Iváncsik 6	(12–13)	Milosavljević 8	Stadthalle, Sursee; Attendance: 2,500; Referees: Hansson, Olsson (SWE)
27 January 2006; 18:00	2× (yellow card) 5× (suspension) 1× (red card)	Report	3× (yellow card) 9× (suspension)	Stadthalle, Sursee; Attendance: 2,500; Referees: Hansson, Olsson (SWE)

27 January 2006; 20:15	Iceland	28–28	Denmark	Stadthalle, Sursee; Attendance: 2,500; Referees: Lemme, Ullrich (GER)
27 January 2006; 20:15	Guðjónsson 10	(15–14)	Boldsen, Leegård 6	Stadthalle, Sursee; Attendance: 2,500; Referees: Lemme, Ullrich (GER)
27 January 2006; 20:15	4× (yellow card) 4× (suspension)	Report	4× (yellow card) 4× (suspension)	Stadthalle, Sursee; Attendance: 2,500; Referees: Lemme, Ullrich (GER)

29 January 2006; 18:00	Hungary	35–31	Iceland	Stadthalle, Sursee; Attendance: 2,400; Referees: Bord, Buy (FRA)
29 January 2006; 18:00	Buday, Gál 9	(16–14)	Guðjónsson 10	Stadthalle, Sursee; Attendance: 2,400; Referees: Bord, Buy (FRA)
29 January 2006; 18:00	3× (yellow card) 3× (suspension)	Report	3× (yellow card) 5× (suspension)	Stadthalle, Sursee; Attendance: 2,400; Referees: Bord, Buy (FRA)

29 January 2006; 20:15	Denmark	33–29	Serbia and Montenegro	Stadthalle, Sursee; Attendance: 2,500; Referees: Breto, Huelin (ESP)
29 January 2006; 20:15	Stryger 9	(19–12)	Sudžum 5	Stadthalle, Sursee; Attendance: 2,500; Referees: Breto, Huelin (ESP)
29 January 2006; 20:15	2× (yellow card) 6× (suspension)	Report	4× (yellow card) 8× (suspension)	Stadthalle, Sursee; Attendance: 2,500; Referees: Breto, Huelin (ESP)

=== Group D ===
This group was played out in the Wankdorfhalle, Bern. Russia became the first team to qualify for the main round when they beat Portugal on 27 January. Croatia joined them later that day with a 32–28 win over Norway, and Norway and Portugal played off for the last main round spot on Sunday 29 January. Norway won that match by ten goals, thus proceeding to the main round with zero points; Russia got a full score with four points, despite nearly throwing away a five-goal lead in the last five minutes against Croatia.

Pos	Team	Pld	W	D	L	GF	GA	GD	Pts
1	Russia	3	3	0	0	89	82	+7	6
2	Croatia	3	2	0	1	85	79	+6	4
3	Norway	3	1	0	2	86	83	+3	2
4	Portugal	3	0	0	3	80	96	−16	0

Source: EHF

26 January 2006; 17:00	Croatia	24–21	Portugal	Wankdorfhalle, Bern; Attendance: 2,000; Referees: Reisinger, Kaschütz (AUT)
26 January 2006; 17:00	Džomba 8	(11–11)	R. Costa 6	Wankdorfhalle, Bern; Attendance: 2,000; Referees: Reisinger, Kaschütz (AUT)
26 January 2006; 17:00	3× (yellow card) 5× (suspension)	Report	4× (yellow card) 6× (suspension)	Wankdorfhalle, Bern; Attendance: 2,000; Referees: Reisinger, Kaschütz (AUT)

26 January 2006; 19:10	Russia	24–21	Norway	Wankdorfhalle, Bern; Attendance: 2,000; Referees: Breto, Huelin (ESP)
26 January 2006; 19:10	Ivanov 7	(12–10)	Buchmann 7	Wankdorfhalle, Bern; Attendance: 2,000; Referees: Breto, Huelin (ESP)
26 January 2006; 19:10	2× (yellow card) 7× (suspension)	Report	3× (yellow card) 9× (suspension) 1× (red card)	Wankdorfhalle, Bern; Attendance: 2,000; Referees: Breto, Huelin (ESP)

27 January 2006; 18:00	Portugal	32–35	Russia	Wankdorfhalle, Bern; Attendance: 2,400; Referees: Falcone, Rätz (SUI)
27 January 2006; 18:00	R. Costa 6	(12–18)	Kokcharov, Peskov 6	Wankdorfhalle, Bern; Attendance: 2,400; Referees: Falcone, Rätz (SUI)
27 January 2006; 18:00	4× (yellow card) 5× (suspension)	Report	4× (yellow card) 7× (suspension)	Wankdorfhalle, Bern; Attendance: 2,400; Referees: Falcone, Rätz (SUI)

27 January 2006; 20:15	Norway	28–32	Croatia	Wankdorfhalle, Bern; Attendance: 2,500; Referees: Bord, Buy (FRA)
27 January 2006; 20:15	Kjelling 6	(14–20)	Balić 8	Wankdorfhalle, Bern; Attendance: 2,500; Referees: Bord, Buy (FRA)
27 January 2006; 20:15	4× (yellow card) 6× (suspension)	Report	2× (yellow card) 4× (suspension)	Wankdorfhalle, Bern; Attendance: 2,500; Referees: Bord, Buy (FRA)

29 January 2006; 17:00	Croatia	29–30	Russia	Wankdorfhalle, Bern; Attendance: 2,500; Referees: Lemme, Ullrich (GER)
29 January 2006; 17:00	Balić 9	(12–17)	Rastvortsev 10	Wankdorfhalle, Bern; Attendance: 2,500; Referees: Lemme, Ullrich (GER)
29 January 2006; 17:00	3× (yellow card) 5× (suspension)	Report	3× (yellow card) 6× (suspension)	Wankdorfhalle, Bern; Attendance: 2,500; Referees: Lemme, Ullrich (GER)

29 January 2006; 19:10	Portugal	27–37	Norway	Wankdorfhalle, Bern; Attendance: 2,000; Referees: Ljudovik, Vakula (UKR)
29 January 2006; 19:10	Carneiro 7	(12–17)	Løke 8	Wankdorfhalle, Bern; Attendance: 2,000; Referees: Ljudovik, Vakula (UKR)
29 January 2006; 19:10	3× (yellow card) 5× (suspension)	Report	4× (yellow card) 5× (suspension)	Wankdorfhalle, Bern; Attendance: 2,000; Referees: Ljudovik, Vakula (UKR)

== Main round ==
Results from the first group stage were carried forward into the main round. The first and second placed teams from each group advance to the semifinals. The third placed team of each group advance to play for the fifth place in the tournament.

=== Group I ===
The matches in this group were played in St. Jakobshalle, Basel. Slovenia had gone through their group with four points from their two matches, but lost initially to France, who were second after two matches. Indeed, Group B teams dominated this group; all nine matches in the second round were won by teams from Group B, and Germany's 36–22 win over Ukraine in the first round of main round play was the largest all tournament. Ukraine were thus knocked out of the semis with two games to play.

Germany continued on the winning path the following day, taking a four-goal lead at half-time against Slovenia in a rerun of the 2004 final, before Slovenia pegged them back to 27–27 midway through the second half. The following nine minutes gave the Germans a five-goal advantage, with keeper Henning Fritz conceding one goal in those nine minutes, and with five minutes to spare Slovenia could only come back to a three-goal deficit. Nevertheless, Germany were still third in the group, as France beat Poland by ten goals and Spain were eventually pegged back to 31–29 by Ukraine after conceding five goals without reply in the last seven minutes. However, Ukraine missed a penalty shot from and Spain prevailed.

The final round of matches opened with Germany beating Poland by eight goals, winning the first half by 16–7 and controlling from there, as their keeper Johannes Bitter saved 21 shots. By contrast, the two Polish keepers had an aggregate of six saves. However, Germany needed either France or Spain to lose their matches, and France would not oblige; they beat Ukraine by 30–20 to qualify for the semi-finals. Spain needed a draw against Slovenia to qualify, and the teams were within two goals of each other for most of the first half. The Spanish goalkeeper made four saves in the final five minutes of the first half, allowing Spain to get a 19–16 lead, and Slovenia never came closer than two goals after that. Spain thus qualified for the semi-finals in first place, ahead of France, while Germany played off for fifth place and a spot at the 2008 European Championship.

Team	Pld	W	D	L	GF	GA	GD	Pts
Spain	5	4	1	0	164	144	+20	9
France	5	4	0	1	148	125	+23	8
Germany	5	3	1	1	160	137	+23	7
Slovenia	5	2	0	3	162	169	−7	4
Poland	5	1	0	4	132	154	−22	2
Ukraine	5	0	0	5	126	163	−37	0

Source: EHF

31 January 2006; 15:15	Ukraine	22–36	Germany	St. Jakobshalle, Basel; Attendance: 2000
31 January 2006; 15:15	Sergiy Shelmenko 5 Yuriy Petrenko 5 (1)	(13–15)	Florian Kehrmann 9 (1); Pascal Hens 5	St. Jakobshalle, Basel; Attendance: 2000
31 January 2006; 15:15	3× (yellow card) 4× (suspension)	report	2× (yellow card) 4× (suspension)	St. Jakobshalle, Basel; Attendance: 2000

31 January 2006; 17:30	Slovenia	30–34	France	St. Jakobshalle, Basel; Attendance: 1900
31 January 2006; 17:30	Miladin Kozlina 8 Siarhei Rutenka 6 (1)	(11–20)	Luc Abalo 8 Joel Abati 5 Nikola Karabatic 5 Bertrand Gille 5	St. Jakobshalle, Basel; Attendance: 1900
31 January 2006; 17:30	3× (yellow card) 5× (suspension) 1× (red card)	report	3× (yellow card) 3× (suspension)	St. Jakobshalle, Basel; Attendance: 1900

31 January 2006; 20:00	Poland	25–34	Spain	St. Jakobshalle, Basel; Attendance: 1800
31 January 2006; 20:00	Marcin Lijewski 5 Karol Bielecki 5 (1)	(15–16)	Albert Rocas 11 (5); Alberto Entrerríos 7 Rolando Urios 5	St. Jakobshalle, Basel; Attendance: 1800
31 January 2006; 20:00	3× (yellow card) 5× (suspension)	report	3× (yellow card) 3× (suspension)	St. Jakobshalle, Basel; Attendance: 1800

1 February 2006; 15:15	Slovenia	33–36	Germany	St. Jakobshalle, Basel; Attendance: 3100
1 February 2006; 15:15	Siarhei Rutenka 10 (5); Renato Vugrinec 7	(16–20)	Christian Zeitz 8 Torsten Jansen 7 (1); Florian Kehrmann 7	St. Jakobshalle, Basel; Attendance: 3100
1 February 2006; 15:15	2× (yellow card) 3× (suspension) 1× (red card)	report	2× (yellow card) 7× (suspension)	St. Jakobshalle, Basel; Attendance: 3100

1 February 2006; 17:45	Poland	21–31	France	St. Jakobshalle, Basel; Attendance: 3000
1 February 2006; 17:45	Marcin Lijewski 7 (2 pen); Dawid Nilsson 6	(9–18)	Olivier Girault 7 (2); Luc Abalo 5	St. Jakobshalle, Basel; Attendance: 3000
1 February 2006; 17:45	3× (yellow card) 1× (suspension)	report	3× (yellow card) 1× (suspension)	St. Jakobshalle, Basel; Attendance: 3000

1 February 2006; 20:00	Ukraine	29–31	Spain	St. Jakobshalle, Basel; Attendance: 3000
1 February 2006; 20:00	Sergiy Shel'menko 5 Mykola Stesyura 5	(13–17)	Juan García 10 (4); Julio Fis 6	St. Jakobshalle, Basel; Attendance: 3000
1 February 2006; 20:00	3× (yellow card) 5× (suspension)	report	3× (yellow card) 3× (suspension)	St. Jakobshalle, Basel; Attendance: 3000

2 February 2006; 15:15	Poland	24–32	Germany	St. Jakobshalle, Basel; Attendance: 3100
2 February 2006; 15:15	Karol Bielecki 8 (4 pen); Leszek Starczan 5	(7–16)	Florian Kehrmann 9 (1); Torsten Jansen 6 Pascal Hens 5	St. Jakobshalle, Basel; Attendance: 3100
2 February 2006; 15:15	3× (yellow card) 2× (suspension)	report	3× (yellow card) 2× (suspension)	St. Jakobshalle, Basel; Attendance: 3100

2 February 2006; 17:45	Ukraine	20–30	France	St. Jakobshalle, Basel; Attendance: 3000
2 February 2006; 17:45	four players 3	(10–16)	Joel Abati 7 (2); Michael Guigou 5	St. Jakobshalle, Basel; Attendance: 3000
2 February 2006; 17:45	3× (yellow card) 4× (suspension)	report	3× (yellow card) 4× (suspension)	St. Jakobshalle, Basel; Attendance: 3000

2 February 2006; 20:00	Slovenia	33–39	Spain	St. Jakobshalle, Basel; Attendance: 3100
2 February 2006; 20:00	Siarhei Rutenka 9 (2); Uroš Zorman 5	(16–19)	Alberto Entrerríos 8 Rolando Urios 8 Albert Rocas 6 (1); Iker Romero 6	St. Jakobshalle, Basel; Attendance: 3100
2 February 2006; 20:00	3× (yellow card) 6× (suspension)	report	3× (yellow card) 5× (suspension)	St. Jakobshalle, Basel; Attendance: 3100

=== Group II ===
This group's matches took place in the Kreuzbleichhalle, St. Gallen.

Iceland took an early lead in this group after beating Russia 34–32 in the first match, which sent Russia down from first to third place. Croatia went second in the group after beating Denmark, left winger Goran Šprem settling the match when he scored two seconds before the end, while Norway were the only team without a point in this group after losing their match with Serbia and Montenegro. With 25 seconds remaining, Kristian Kjelling scored a penalty to equalise, but Milorad Krivokapić scored his only goal of the match just as the buzzer sounded to give Serbia and Montenegro the victory.

Russia quickly recovered from the loss against Iceland, with their keeper Alexei Kostygov saving 14 of 34 shots as Serbia/Montenegro were beaten 29–21, and went top of the table ahead of Croatia – who beat Iceland by one goal, though Iceland's last two goals came in the very last minute. In the last match on 1 February, Denmark kept their semi-final hopes alive with a 35–31 win over Norway, to stay within one point of the leaders.

The following day saw Croatia become the first team to qualify for the semi-finals when they beat Serbia and Montenegro by 34–30; the teams followed each other until 20–20 ten minutes into the second half, when wingers Goran Šprem and Mirza Džomba scored five of six successive Croatian goals. Goalkeeper Vlado Šola saved 19 of 43 shots from Serbian players. Iceland needed a win against Norway, who had failed to win a match thus far in the tournament, and led 16–14 at half time after Norway threw away the ball on their last attack of the half and Iceland countered in a last goal. Norway came back, equalising eight minutes into the second half, and with ten minutes to go they took a three-goal lead which they never relinquished, eventually winning 36–33 to knock Iceland out of the championship. Norwegian back player Kjetil Strand scored 19 goals in the match, eight more than any other player had done in a match thus far in the tournament, and more than half of Norway's goals.

The final match between Russia and Denmark was now a virtual quarter-final. Russia gained a 6–3 lead after ten minutes, but were pegged back, and by the end of the half it was 13–13. In the second half, Russia suffered three two-minute suspensions within a minute, and during the three-minute period of Danish numerical superiority they went from 19–17 to 22–17. The lead never shrunk below five goals again, Denmark eventually scoring 22 goals in the second half to win 35–28 and qualify for the semi-finals in second place.

Team	Pld	W	D	L	GF	GA	GD	Pts
Croatia	5	4	0	1	155	146	+9	8
Denmark	5	3	1	1	161	147	+14	7
Russia	5	3	0	2	143	140	+3	6
Iceland	5	2	1	2	159	156	+3	5
Serbia and Montenegro	5	1	0	4	137	157	−20	2
Norway	5	1	0	4	141	150	−9	2

Source: EHF

31 January 2006; 15:45	Iceland	34–32	Russia	Kreuzbleichhalle, St. Gallen; Attendance: 2200
31 January 2006; 15:45	Guðjón Valur Sigurðsson 11; Ólafur Stefánsson 8	(17–15)	Eduard Kokcharov 8 (4); Vasily Filippov 7 Oleg Frolov 5	Kreuzbleichhalle, St. Gallen; Attendance: 2200
31 January 2006; 15:45	3× (yellow card) 4× (suspension)	report	2× (yellow card) 6× (suspension)	Kreuzbleichhalle, St. Gallen; Attendance: 2200

31 January 2006; 18:00	Denmark	30–31	Croatia	Kreuzbleichhalle, St. Gallen; Attendance: 3000
31 January 2006; 18:00	Søren Stryger 8 (3); Joachim Boldsen 6	(14–15)	Petar Metličić 10; Blaženko Lacković 6	Kreuzbleichhalle, St. Gallen; Attendance: 3000
31 January 2006; 18:00	2× (yellow card) 6× (suspension)	report	2× (yellow card) 4× (suspension)	Kreuzbleichhalle, St. Gallen; Attendance: 3000

31 January 2006; 20:15	Serbia and Montenegro	26–25	Norway	Kreuzbleichhalle, St. Gallen; Attendance: 2900
31 January 2006; 20:15	Ratko Nikolić 6	(15–16)	Kjetil Strand 9 Kristian Kjelling 5 (2)	Kreuzbleichhalle, St. Gallen; Attendance: 2900
31 January 2006; 20:15	3× (yellow card) 5× (suspension)	report	4× (yellow card) 5× (suspension)	Kreuzbleichhalle, St. Gallen; Attendance: 2900

1 February 2006; 15:45	Serbia and Montenegro	21–29	Russia	Kreuzbleichhalle, St. Gallen; Attendance: 2800
1 February 2006; 15:45		(8–14)	Denis Krivoshlykov 8 Timur Dibirov 5	Kreuzbleichhalle, St. Gallen; Attendance: 2800
1 February 2006; 15:45	3× (yellow card) 4× (suspension)	report	3× (yellow card) 5× (suspension)	Kreuzbleichhalle, St. Gallen; Attendance: 2800

1 February 2006; 18:00	Iceland	28–29	Croatia	Kreuzbleichhalle, St. Gallen; Attendance: 3500
1 February 2006; 18:00	Ólafur Stefánsson 8 Guðjón Valur Sigurðsson 8	(13–13)	Ivano Balić 9 Blaženko Lacković 9	Kreuzbleichhalle, St. Gallen; Attendance: 3500
1 February 2006; 18:00	3× (yellow card) 6× (suspension)	report	3× (yellow card) 11× (suspension) 2× (red card)	Kreuzbleichhalle, St. Gallen; Attendance: 3500

1 February 2006; 20:15	Denmark	35–31	Norway	Kreuzbleichhalle, St. Gallen; Attendance: 3000
1 February 2006; 20:15	Jesper Jensen 8 (5); Lars Rasmussen 7 (4)	(17–15)	Kristian Kjelling 9 Håvard Tvedten 7 Frank Løke 6	Kreuzbleichhalle, St. Gallen; Attendance: 3000
1 February 2006; 20:15	3× (yellow card) 6× (suspension) 1× (red card)	report	3× (yellow card) 9× (suspension)	Kreuzbleichhalle, St. Gallen; Attendance: 3000

2 February 2006; 15:45	Serbia and Montenegro	30–34	Croatia	Kreuzbleichhalle, St. Gallen; Attendance: 3500
2 February 2006; 15:45	Marko Krivokapić 7 (4); Milorad Krivokapić 5 Momir Ilić 5 (2)	(16–16)	Goran Šprem 9 Ivano Balić 8	Kreuzbleichhalle, St. Gallen; Attendance: 3500
2 February 2006; 15:45	3× (yellow card) 7× (suspension) 2× (red card)	report	3× (yellow card) 5× (suspension) 1× (red card)	Kreuzbleichhalle, St. Gallen; Attendance: 3500

2 February 2006; 18:00	Iceland	33–36	Norway	Kreuzbleichhalle, St. Gallen; Attendance: 3500
2 February 2006; 18:00	Ólafur Stefánsson 9 (4); Guðjón Valur Sigurðsson 6 Snorri Guðjónsson 5	(16–14)	Kjetil Strand 19 (8); Frank Løke 7	Kreuzbleichhalle, St. Gallen; Attendance: 3500
2 February 2006; 18:00	3× (yellow card) 7× (suspension) 1× (red card)	report	3× (yellow card) 7× (suspension)	Kreuzbleichhalle, St. Gallen; Attendance: 3500

2 February 2006; 20:15	Denmark	35–28	Russia	Kreuzbleichhalle, St. Gallen; Attendance: 3500
2 February 2006; 20:15	Michael Knudsen 10; Søren Stryger 6 Lars Christiansen 5 (1)	(13–13)	Vasily Filippov 6 Vitali Ivanov 5 Eduard Kokcharov 5 (5)	Kreuzbleichhalle, St. Gallen; Attendance: 3500
2 February 2006; 20:15	2× (yellow card) 5× (suspension)	report	3× (yellow card) 6× (suspension)	Kreuzbleichhalle, St. Gallen; Attendance: 3500

== Final round ==
These took place in the largest stadium to be used in the tournament, the Hallenstadion in Zürich (capacity 11,500). The first match was the fifth-place play-off, determining the final direct qualifying spot for the 2008 European Men's Handball Championship; the other semi-finalists had already qualified directly. Russia took a two-goal lead through Oleg Frolov when he gave them 6–4 in the ninth minute, and Germany failed to catch up before half-time, though they won the last eight minutes 5–3. Russia went into the break with an 18–16 lead, but failed to score for eight minutes midway through the second half, while Christian Zeitz scored four successive goals for Germany to take them into a three-goal lead, which they kept for the remainder of the match despite Eduard Kokcharov scoring two penalties with five minutes to go. Zeitz ended up with 12 goals, eight of which came in the second half.

In the first of the two semi-finals, France faced Croatia, and after Croatia won the first 20 minutes by 10–8 the French goalkeeper Thierry Omeyer shut the goal. Nine saves were recorded before half-time, as France went into a 12–10 lead, and a further two in the first five minutes of the second half allowed France to build a four-goal lead. They never gave it away again, as Michael Guigou netted six times in the second half to ensure a 29–23 victory.

Spain became the second team from preliminary group B to qualify for the final, coming back from a 15–16 deficit at half time when Iker Romero scored four successive goals for Spain to bring them from 20–19 to 24–20. Denmark came within one goal, when Lars Rasmussen netted on a fast break, but three Spanish goals and two saves followed, and the Danes never came back in the match.

Denmark won the third place play-off, however, coming back from 2–5 down to lead 16–9 at half time against Croatia and eventually winning by five goals, before France went into the final against the defending World Champions Spain. France had lost the group stage match by three goals, and Spain took a 4–1 lead after five minutes, before a four-minute rally from France brought them back in the lead. Spain were catching up for the most part of the first half, equalising four times but not taking the lead until Iker Romero scored a penalty shot in the 21st minute. France then won the last nine minutes of the half by 6–1, and went into the break with a four-goal lead.

Coming out of the break, Spain came within two goals, trailing by 20–22 when ten minutes had passed. However, they then went nearly fifteen minutes without a goal, which included a period of playing with six men against four. When Rolando Urios finally scored, France still led by 28–21 with six minutes to go, and France eventually won the match by 31–23 to win their first European Championship.

=== Bracket ===
Semi-finals
4 February – 14:15 (Zürich)
France	29
Croatia	23
4 February – 17:00 (Zürich)
Spain	34
Denmark	31

Final
5 February – 16:00 (Zürich)
France	31
Spain	23
Bronze Match
5 February – 13:30 (Zürich)
Croatia	27
Denmark	32

=== Semifinals ===
4 February 2006; 14:15	France	29–23	Croatia	Hallenstadion, Zürich; Attendance: 11300
4 February 2006; 14:15	Michael Guigou 10 (6); Jerome Fernandez 5 Bertrand Gille 5	(12–10)	Mirza Džomba 10 (5)	Hallenstadion, Zürich; Attendance: 11300
4 February 2006; 14:15	3× (yellow card) 6× (suspension)	Report	3× (yellow card) 5× (suspension)	Hallenstadion, Zürich; Attendance: 11300

4 February 2006; 17:00	Spain	34–31	Denmark	Hallenstadion, Zürich; Attendance: 10800
4 February 2006; 17:00	Iker Romero 10 (1); Rolando Urios 5 Albert Rocas 5 (3)	(15–16)	Michael Knudsen 7	Hallenstadion, Zürich; Attendance: 10800
4 February 2006; 17:00	2× (yellow card) 1× (suspension)	Report	3× (yellow card) 2× (suspension)	Hallenstadion, Zürich; Attendance: 10800

=== Fifth place game ===
4 February 2006; 11:45	Germany	32–30	Russia	Hallenstadion, Zürich; Attendance: 6500
4 February 2006; 11:45	Christian Zeitz 12; Pascal Hens 10	(16–18)	Eduard Kokcharov 10 (7); Oleg Frolov 7	Hallenstadion, Zürich; Attendance: 6500
4 February 2006; 11:45	3× (yellow card) 7× (suspension)	report	3× (yellow card) 5× (suspension) 1× (red card)	Hallenstadion, Zürich; Attendance: 6500

=== Third place game ===
5 February 2006; 13:30	Denmark	32–27	Croatia	Hallenstadion, Zürich; Attendance: 11000
5 February 2006; 13:30	Lars Møller Madsen 9 Jesper Jensen 5 Søren Stryger 5 (1)	(16–9)	Blaženko Lacković 6 Mirza Džomba 6 (4); Denis Špoljarić 5	Hallenstadion, Zürich; Attendance: 11000
5 February 2006; 13:30	2× (yellow card) 5× (suspension)	report	3× (yellow card) 3× (suspension)	Hallenstadion, Zürich; Attendance: 11000

=== Final ===
5 February 2006; 16:00	Spain	23–31	France	Hallenstadion, Zürich; Attendance: 11400
5 February 2006; 16:00	Juanín García 6	(13–17)	Nikola Karabatic 11; Joel Abati 6	Hallenstadion, Zürich; Attendance: 11400
5 February 2006; 16:00	3× (yellow card) 3× (suspension)	report	3× (yellow card) 3× (suspension) 1× (red card)	Hallenstadion, Zürich; Attendance: 11400

== Ranking and statistics ==
=== Final ranking ===
1st place, gold medalist(s)	France
2nd place, silver medalist(s)	Spain
3rd place, bronze medalist(s)	Denmark
4	Croatia
5	Germany
6	Russia
7	Iceland
8	Slovenia
9	Serbia and Montenegro
10	Poland
11	Norway
12	Ukraine
13	Hungary
14	Switzerland
15	Portugal
16	Slovakia

=== All-Star Team ===
Position	Player
Goalkeeper	Thierry Omeyer (FRA)
Right wing	Søren Stryger (DEN)
Right back	Ólafur Stefánsson (ISL)
Centre back	Ivano Balić (CRO)
Left back	Iker Romero (ESP)
Left wing	Eduard Koksharov (RUS)
Pivot	Rolando Uríos (ESP)
Most valuable player	Ivano Balić (CRO)

Source: EHF Archived 12 August 2022 at the Wayback Machine

=== Top goalscorers ===
Rank	Name	Team	Goals	Shots	%
1	Siarhei Rutenka	Slovenia	51	81	63
2	Albert Rocas	Spain	45	56	80
3	Eduard Koksharov	Russia	44	58	76
4	Ivano Balić	Croatia	43	74	58
5	Snorri Gudjónsson	Iceland	42	67	63
6	Nikola Karabatic	France	40	72	56
6	Iker Romero	Spain	40	71	56
6	Søren Stryger	Denmark	40	62	65
9	Florian Kehrmann	Germany	39	66	59
9	Michael Knudsen	Denmark	39	51	76

Source: EHF

=== Top goalkeepers ===
(minimum 20% of total shots received by team)

Rank	Name	Team	%	Saves	Shots
1	Johannes Bitter	Germany	39	35	90
2	José Javier Hombrados	Spain	38	54	143
2	Thierry Omeyer	France	38	99	258
4	Kasper Hvidt	Denmark	36	85	237
4	Beno Lapajne	Slovenia	36	36	100
4	Pascal Stauber	Switzerland	36	30	84
7	David Barrufet	Spain	35	77	219
7	Ole Erevik	Norway	35	24	68
7	Michal Meluš	Slovakia	35	13	37
7	Vlado Šola	Croatia	35	95	275
7	Sławomir Szmal	Poland	35	67	191

Source: EHF
