= Wankdorf =

Wankdorf can mean:

- Wankdorf Stadium, a football stadium in Bern, Switzerland, that existed from 1925 to 2001
- Stadion Wankdorf, the successor stadium of the above, built at the same place
- Wankdorfhalle, an indoor sporting arena in Bern, Switzerland
