= European Kendo Championships =

International kendo competition

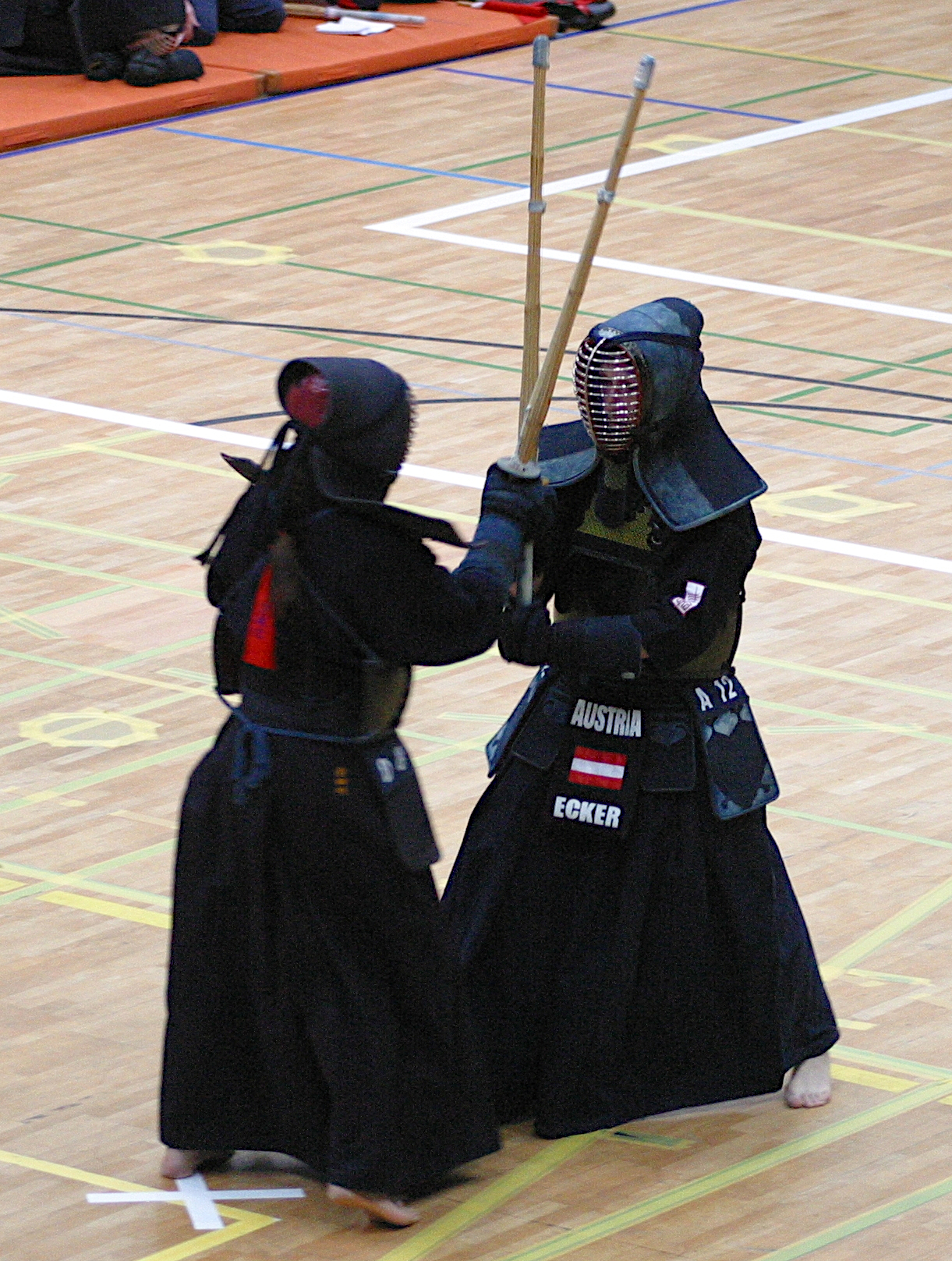
- The 2005 European Championships in Bern, Switzerland

Competition details
- Discipline: Kendo
- Organiser: European Kendo Federation (EKF)

History
- First edition: 1974 European Kendo Championships in Bletchley, United Kingdom
- Most wins: France – 160 medals (68 gold medals)
- Most recent: 2026 European Kendo Championships in Podgorica, Montenegro
- Next edition: TBD

The European Kendo Championships are an international kendo competition contested by the member nations of the European Kendo Federation (EKF). EKF is the international federation of kendo associations in Europe as well as the governing body for members of EKF. The championships have been conducted generally every year except when there is a scheduled World Kendo Championship the same year, the first EKC's inception being in 1974. The competition is divided into 6 divisions: Men's Team, Women's Team, Junior Team, Men's Individual, Women's Individual, Junior Individual. Team matches are individual between 5 members from each team which change sequentially at the end of each round, except in the Junior category which is between 3 members from each team, male or female.

== Medal table ==
=== Men's Teams Division ===
The following is a summary of medals acquired by country for the Men's Teams Division.

Rank	Nation	Gold	Silver	Bronze	Total
1	France	24	5	1	30
2	Belgium	2	2	3	7
3	Hungary	2	1	3	6
4	Germany	1	7	6	14
5	Italy	1	5	10	16
6	Spain	1	2	9	12
7	Sweden	1	2	4	7
8	Great Britain	0	2	8	10
9	Poland	0	1	5	6
10	Netherlands	0	1	3	4
11	Switzerland	0	1	2	3
12	Finland	0	1	1	2
13	Serbia	0	1	0	1
Totals (13 entries)		32	31	55	118

=== Men's individuals Division ===
The following is a summary of medals acquired by country for the Men's individuals Division.

Rank	Nation	Gold	Silver	Bronze	Total
1	France	12	8	21	41
2	Germany	5	6	9	20
3	Hungary	3	2	6	11
4	Italy	3	2	2	7
5	Belgium	2	2	6	10
6	Sweden	2	2	5	9
7	Great Britain	2	2	1	5
8	Netherlands	2	1	1	4
9	Spain	1	0	3	4
10	Switzerland	0	2	1	3
11	Czech Republic	0	1	0	1
11	Finland	0	1	0	1
13	Norway	0	0	4	4
14	Poland	0	0	2	2
Totals (14 entries)		32	29	61	122

=== Individual Champions (Men) ===
Year	Final		Third Place	
Year	Winner	Runner-up	Third Place	
1974	D. Todd, United Kingdom	J.C. Tuvi, France	J.P. Niay, France	A. Markie, Sweden
1977	G. Sterckx, Belgium	P. Otto Forstreuter, Germany	J. Lopiccolo, France	A. Deguitre, France
1978	J. Lopiccolo, France	K. Davies, United Kingdom	G. Sterckx, Belgium	D. Olivry, France
1981	H. Bier, Germany	H. Maierhofer, Switzerland	A. Deguitre, France	D. Olivry, France
1983	J.C. Girot, France	R. Jattkowsky, Germany	J. Lopiccolo, France	P. Van Laecken, Belgium
1984	J. Lopiccolo, France	R. Lehman, Germany	J.C. Girot, France	H. Bier, Germany
1986	J. Potrafki, Germany	H. Maierhofer, Switzerland	J. Lopiccolo, France	J.C. Wolfs, Belgium
1987	J. Potrafki, Germany	A. Deguitre, France	J.C. Girot, France	R. Lehman, Germany
1989	C. Pruvost, France	P. Bjerlow, Sweden	J. Potrafki, Germany	S. Velasquez, Netherlands
1990	S. Velasquez, Netherlands	C. Pruvost, France	T. Andersen, Norway	E. Hamot, France
1992	R. Lehman, Germany	J.P. Labru, France	T. Andersen, Norway	M. Wahlquist, Sweden
1993	M. Wahlquist, Sweden	G. Nicholas, United Kingdom	T. Andersen, Norway	J.P. Labru, France
1995	R. Lehman, Germany	W. Pomero, Italy	S. Perrin, France	T. Andersen, Norway
1996	F. Tran, France	R. Lehman, Germany	D. Castro, Spain	M. Wahlquist, Sweden
1998	M. Herbold, Netherlands	T. Barany, Hungary	F. Salson, France	G. Erdelyi, Hungary
1999	D. Castro, Spain	M. Herbold, Netherlands	T. De Brunel, France	B. Gustavsson, Sweden
2001	G. Erdelyi, Hungary	M. Wahlquist, Sweden	D. Castro, Spain	F. Blachon, France
2002	A. Soulas, France	W. Haeke, Belgium	T. Barany, Hungary	M. Wahlquist, Sweden
2004	F. Mandia, Italy	J. Ulmer, Germany	J. Sengfelder, Germany	J. Castro, Spain
2005	H. Blanchard, France	J. Ulmer, Germany	J. Sengfelder, Germany	A. Soulas, France
2007	G. Sicart, France	E. Yonnet, France	A. Diebold, France	J. Ulmer, Germany
2008	S. Dubi, Hungary	G. Sicart, France	H.P. Herr, Germany	W. Haeke, Belgium
2010	F. Mandia, Italy	A. Korhonen, Finland	A. Dubi, Hungary	N. Kiraly, Hungary
2011	S. Dubi, Hungary	F. Mandia, Italy	G. Babos, Hungary	O. Kimura, Switzerland
2013	G. Giannetto, Italy	K. Nakabayshi, France	S. Dubi, Hungary	A. Fisher, United Kingdom
2014	S. Gibson, United Kingdom	K. Maemoto, Belgium	D. Baeli, Italy	K. Ito, France
2016	K. Maemoto, Belgium	A. Pons, France	K. Bosak, Poland	K. Ito, France
2017	K. Ito, France	M. Fritz, Czech Republic	F. Mandia, Italy	K. Maemoto, Belgium
2019	K. Nakabayashi, France	G. Babos, Hungary	M. Kaczor, Poland	J. Bertout, France
2022	L. Przewlocki, France	K. Rukas, United Kingdom	K. Maemoto, Belgium	H. Ohno, Germany
2023	L. Przewlocki, France	W. Olivier, France	K. Maemoto, Belgium	E. Manzella, Italy
2025	M. Arfert, Sweden	J. K. Wright, United Kingdom	L. Klein, Germany	K. Nakabayashi, France
2026	J. K. Wright, United Kingdom	L. Guadarrama, France	L. Klein, Germany	K. Nakabayashi, France

=== Women's team ===
The following is a summary of medals acquired by country for the Women's Team Division.

Rank	Nation	Gold	Silver	Bronze	Total
1	Germany	7	4	1	12
2	France	6	5	9	20
3	Finland	3	1	5	9
4	Italy	1	3	5	9
5	Hungary	1	3	2	6
6	Netherlands	1	1	2	4
7	Switzerland	1	0	5	6
8	Poland	0	2	4	6
9	Great Britain	0	1	3	4
10	Serbia	0	1	0	1
11	Netherlands	0	0	1	1
Totals (11 entries)		20	21	37	78

=== Individual Champions (Women) ===
Year	Final		Third Place	
Year	Winner	Runner-up	Third Place	
1989	J. Dekker, Netherlands	M.G. Passerella, Italy	M. Morel, Germany	S. Meresse, France
1990	A. Neumeister, Germany	I. Benkmann, Germany	M. Livolsi, Italy	E. Fournier, France
1992	A. Esshaki, Germany	A. Nemeth, Hungary	I. Benkmann, Germany	A. Stone, United Kingdom
1993	C. Sasakura, France	A. Nemeth, Hungary	D. Castelli, Italy	I. Benkmann, Germany
1995	C. Sasakura, France	A. Esshaki, Germany	J. Dekker, Netherlands	I. Benkmann, Germany
1996	M. Livolsi, Italy	J. Dekker, Netherlands	K. Niklaus, Switzerland	I. Benkmann, Germany
1998	M. Livolsi, Italy	J. Dekker, Netherlands	C. David, France	S. Porevuo, Finland
1999	M. Livolsi, Italy	O. Martin, Spain	N. Soulas, France	O. Kaarlanen,Finland
2001	B. Kiraly, Hungary	A. Costa, Italy	S. Loustale, France	N. Soulas, France
2002	B. Kiraly, Hungary	S. Porevuo, Finland	O. Martin, Spain	S. Loustale, France
2004	B. Kiraly, Hungary	C. Garcia, France	A. Destobbeleer, France	A. Sipos, Hungary
2005	C. Garcia, France	A. Destobbeleer, France	B. Kiraly, Hungary	K. Kovacs, Hungary
2007	B. Kiraly, Hungary	L. Van Laecken, Belgium	C. Garcia, France	M. Livolsi, Italy
2008	S. Aoki, Germany	W. Roehrbein, Germany	B. Kiraly, Hungary	P. Stolarz, France
2010	S. Kumpf, Germany	S. Fadai, Germany	K. Grosiak, Poland	P. Stolarz, France
2011	P. Stolarz, France	A. Blanchard, France	S. Fadai, Germany	M. Boviz, Hungary
2013	S. Fadai, Germany	S. Van Der Woude, Netherlands	A. Momcilovic, Serbia	M. Boviz, Hungary
2014	S. Van Der Woude, Netherlands	M. Boviz, Hungary	S. Ricciuti, Italy	S. Kumpf, Germany
2016	K. Koppe, Germany	S. Van Der Woude, Netherlands	L. Meinberg, Germany	A. Michaud, France
2017	P. Stolarz, France	A. Akila, Greece	F. D'Hont, Belgium	S. Ade, Germany
2019	L. Meinberg, Germany	M. Ponomareva, Russia	A. Akila, Greece	F. Smout, Netherlands
2022	F. D'Hont, Belgium	R. Ogle, United Kingdom	L. Van Laecken, Belgium	A. Yearwood, Poland
2023	N. Eichlerova, Czech Republic	A. Yearwood, Poland	K. Babinska, Poland	S. Guadarrama, France
2025	K. Moutarde, France	S. Guadarrama, France	M. Murakami, Austria	I. Kulyk, Ukraine
2026	M. Murakami, Austria	A. Robin, France	S. van Laecken, Belgium	K. Babinska, Poland

=== Junior’s team ===
The following is a summary of medals acquired by country for the junior's team division.

Rank	Nation	Gold	Silver	Bronze	Total
1	France	6	1	5	12
2	Russia	2	1	1	4
3	Serbia	2	1	0	3
4	Italy	1	0	2	3
5	Great Britain	1	0	1	2
6	Poland	0	3	3	6
7	Germany	0	2	3	5
8	Spain	0	2	1	3
9	Hungary	0	1	1	2
9	Sweden	0	1	1	2
11	Romania	0	1	0	1
12	Czech Republic	0	0	2	2
12	Switzerland	0	0	2	2
14	Belgium	0	0	1	1
14	Netherlands	0	0	1	1
Totals (15 entries)		12	13	24	49

=== Individual Male Champions (Junior) ===
Year	Final		Third Place	
Year	Winner	Runner-up	Third Place	
1993	T. Brunel De Bonneville, France	L. Labarre, France	S. Bousique, France	D. Castro Rabadan, Spain
1995	J. Castro Rabadán, Spain	Y.B. Diaz, France	G. Monsorez, France	C. Meunier, France
1996	N. Király, Hungary	E. Brunet, France	J. Ulmer, Germany	K. Néméth, Hungary
1998	W. Haeke, Belgium	K. Néméth, Hungary	E. D’Angelo, France	Y. Nakahara, Switzerland
1999	E. Yonnet, France	W. Haeke, Belgium	C. Jabouley, France	L. Kho, Netherlands
2001	S. Bognár, Hungary	A. Duvauchelle, France	S. Nakamura, France	A. Dubi, Hungary
2002	A. Diebold, France	S. Kautz, Germany	B. De Bussac, France	T. D’Hont Belgium
2004	R. Kumpf, Germany	J. Zailachi, Belgium	D.S. Crãciun, Romania	G. Babos, Hungary
2005	G. Babos, Hungary	M. Jastak, Poland	S. Kato, Germany	S. Fadai, Germany
2007	K. Nakabayashi, France	J. Carpentier, France	G. Pezzo, Italy	M. Arregui Martin, Spain
2008	M. Arregui Martin, Spain	B. Gromul, Poland	S. Cohen, France	M. Petrovic, Serbia
2010	G. Dubilin, Russia	L.P Martin, France	B. Bois, France	A. Moretti, Italy
2011	G. Dublilin, Russia	P. Kuhn, Germany	A. Milosevic, Serbia	R. Van Riel, Netherlands
2013	G.Abou El Seoud, France	V.G. Chiera, Romania	D.A. Kim, Russia	E. Thivolle, France
2014	K. Kremcheev, Russia	L. Klein, Germany	L. Guadarrama, France	A. Ruge, Germany
2016	L. Moutarde, France	T. Komjáti, Hungary	L. Guadarrama, France	M. Lukács, Hungary
2017	L. Moutarde, France	K. Kometov, Russia	P. Debray-Deschodt, France	N.D. Sibinovic, Serbia
2019	L. Klyuev, Russia	J.K. Wright, United Kingdom	R. Kusurgashev, Russia	M-C. Cornea, Romania
2022	L. Ilić, Serbia	T. Adeyinka, United Kingdom	F. Spilarewicz, Germany	N. Medina Wolpert, Spain
2023	S. Bessa, France	A. Buithe, France	Y. Bouaita, France	R. Biscomb, United Kingdom
2025	G. Grossin, France	B. Ishibashi, France	N. Cadete, United Kingdom	H. De Smet, Belgium
2026	D. Krizbai, Hungary	E. Drera, Italy	L. Kosor, Croatia	T. Toymil, Spain

=== Individual Female Champions (Junior) ===
Year	Final		Third Place	
Year	Winner	Runner-up	Third Place	
2025	M. Shiozawa, Spain	C. Leigh, United Kingdom	S. Chesneau, France	S. Zalewska, United Kingdom
2026	M. Shiozawa, Spain	S. Chesneau, France	S. Zalewska, United Kingdom	N. Fisher, United Kingdom

== Summary of championships ==
No.	Year	City	Country	Venue
1	1974	Bletchley	United Kingdom	
2	1977	Papendal	Netherlands	
3	1978	Chambery	France	
4	1981	Berlin	West Germany	
5	1983	Chambery	France	
6	1984	Brussels	Belgium	
7	1986	London	United Kingdom	
8	1987	Malmö	Sweden	
9	1989	Amsterdam	Netherlands	
10	1990	Berlin	West Germany	Sporthalle Schöneberg
11	1992	Barcelona	Spain	Palau Sant Jordi
12	1993	Turku	Finland	
13	1995	Glasgow	United Kingdom	Kelvin Hall
14	1996	Miskolc	Hungary	Miskolc Városi Szabadidőközpont
15	1998	Basel	Switzerland	Sportzentrum Pfaffenholz
16	1999	Lourdes	France	Palais des Sports "François Abadie"
17	2001	Bologna	Italy	
18	2002	Nantes	France	Beaulieu Sports Center
19	2004	Budapest	Hungary	
20	2005	Bern	Switzerland	Wankdorfhalle
21	2007	Lisbon	Portugal	Sports Complex Casal Vistoso
22	2008	Helsinki	Finland	Töölö Sports Hall
23	2010	Debrecen	Hungary	Főnix Arena
24	2011	Gdynia	Poland	Gdynia Arena
25	2013	Berlin	Germany	Max-Schmeling-Halle
26	2014	Clermont-Ferrand	France	Artenium
27	2016	Skopje	North Macedonia	National Sport Arena
28	2017	Budapest	Hungary	Tüskecsarnok
29	2019	Belgrade	Serbia	Štark Arena
30	The 2020 championship planned in Kristiansand, Norway, was cancelled due to the COVID-19 pandemic.			
31	2022	Frankfurt	Germany	Sport & Freizeitzentrum Kalbach
32	2023	Beauvais	France	Elispace
33	2025	Leiden	Netherlands	Sportcomplex 1574
34	2026	Podgorica	Montenegro	Verde Complex
35	2028	TBD	Serbia (Candidate)	TBD
36	2029	TBD	Portugal (Candidate)	TBD
