= Søren Stryger =

Danish handball player

Personal information
- Born: 7 February 1975 (age 51) Køge, Denmark
- Height: 1.88 m (6 ft 2 in)

Sport
- Sport: Handball
- Position: Right Wing
- Current club: Retired

Senior clubs
- Years: Team
- -1996: Maribo
- 1996-1999: Vrold Skanderborg
- 1999-2001: GOG Gudme
- 2001-2008: SG Flensburg-Handewitt
National team
Years	Team	Apps	(Gls)
1998-2007	Denmark	151	(482)
Medal record
Representing Denmark
Men's handball
World Championships
Bronze medal – third place	2007 Germany	Team competition
European Championships
Bronze medal – third place	2002 Sweden	Team competition
Bronze medal – third place	2004 Slovenia	Team competition
Bronze medal – third place	2006 Switzerland	Team competition

Søren Stryger (born 7 February 1975) is a Danish retired team handball player. He lastly played for the German club SG Flensburg-Handewitt.

He has played on the national team at European and World championships and won several medals with the Danish national handball team. In both 2000 and 2004 he was named Danish handball player of the year.

== Private life ==
He lives with his wife, Eva, and their two sons in Flensburg. He has a Master of Science in Business Administration and Commercial Law.
