= Goran Šprem =

Croatian handball player (born 1979)

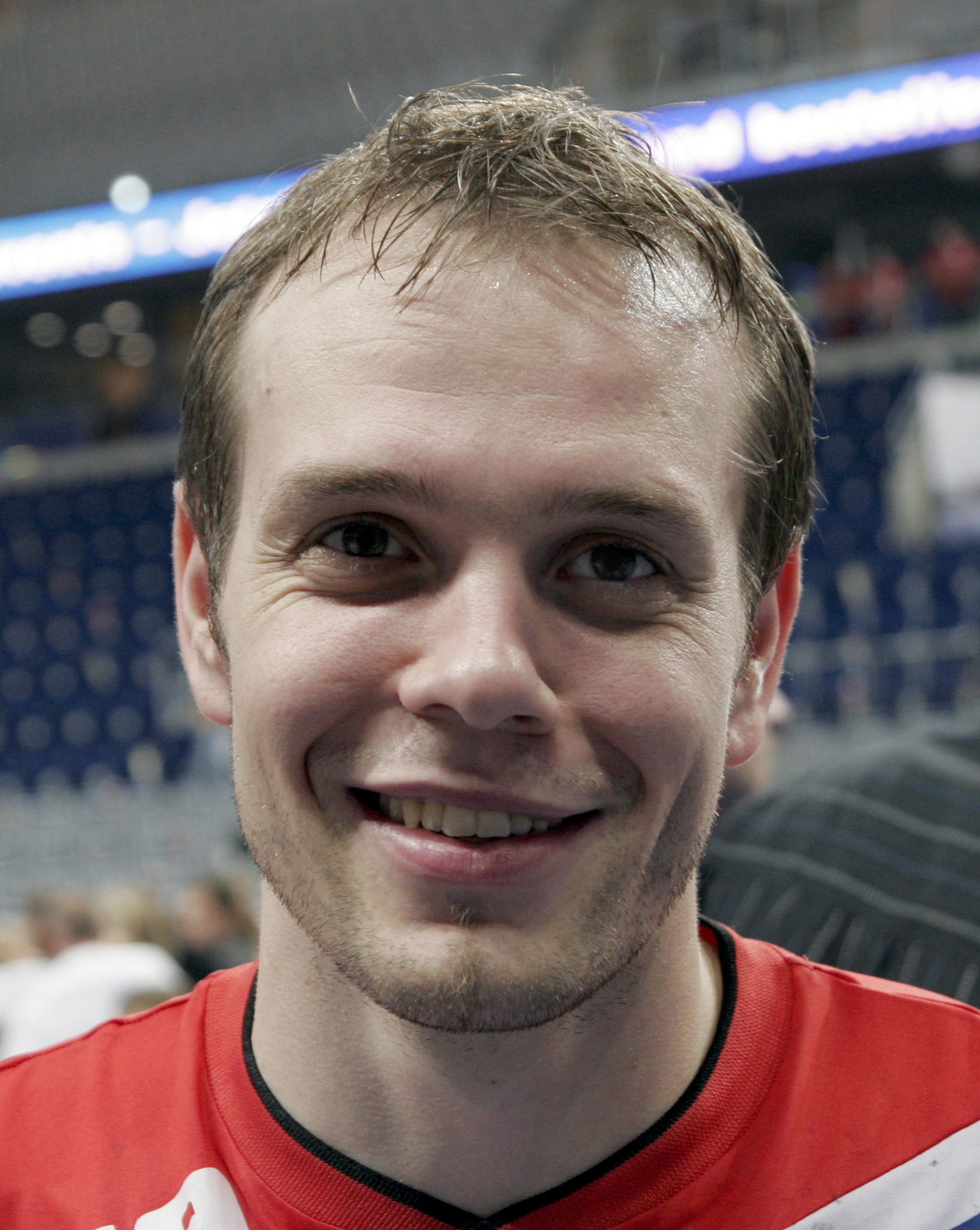

Personal information
- Nationality: Croatian
- Born: 6 July 1979 (age 47) Dubrovnik, SFR Yugoslavia
- Height: 1.84 m (6 ft 0 in)

Sport
- Sport: Handball
- Position: Left wing

Senior clubs
- Years: Team
- 1996-2001: Badel 1862 Zagreb
- 2001-2002: Medveščak Infosistem
- 2002-2004: RK Zagreb
- 2004-2005: SG Flensburg-Handewitt
- 2005: TuS Nettelstedt-Lübbecke
- 2005-2006: SG Flensburg-Handewitt
- 2006: MT Melsungen
- 2006-2009: HSG Nordhorn
- 2009-2011: Croatia Osiguranje Zagreb
- 2011-2013: VfL Gummersbach
National team
Years	Team	Apps	(Gls)
1999-2009	Croatia	109	(277)
Medal record
Men's handball
Representing Croatia
Olympic Games
Gold medal – first place	2004 Athens	Team
World Championship
Gold medal – first place	2003 Portugal	Team
Silver medal – second place	2005 Tunisia	Team
Silver medal – second place	2009 Croatia	Team
Statoil World Cup
Gold medal – first place	2006 Sweden & Germany	Team
Mediterranean Games
Gold medal – first place	2001 Tunis	Team

Goran Šprem (born 6 July 1979) is a Croatian former handball player.

Šprem started his professional career with RK Zagreb in the late 1990s. He also spent a season with RK Medveščak Zagreb in 2001 and 2002, before returning to RK Zagreb for a second spell with the club between 2002 and 2004. He eventually left RK Zagreb for German side SG Flensburg-Handewitt in October 2004. He left Flensburg for a short spell with TuS Nettelstedt in February 2005, returning to the club in the summer of the same year and eventually spending a season with them. In the summer of 2006, he left Flensburg for a short spell with MT Melsungen, before joining his current club, HSG Nordhorn, in November 2006. He left Nordhorn in 2009.

Šprem is also a member of the Croatian national handball team, with whom he won gold medals at the 2003 World Men's Handball Championship and the 2004 Summer Olympics. He also won two silver medals with the Croatian national team at the World Men's Handball Championships in 2005 and 2009, and participated at the 2006 European Men's Handball Championship, where Croatia finished fourth.

Since his retirement he's been a pundit on RTL Televizija.

== Honours ==
Zagreb

- Dukat Premier League
  - Winner (9): 1996–97, 1997–98, 1998–99, 1999–00, 2000–01, 2002–03, 2003–04, 2009–10, 2010–11
- Croatian Cup
  - Winner (8): 1997, 1998, 1999, 2000, 2003, 2004, 2010, 2011
- EHF Champions League
  - Finalist (2): 1997-98, 1998-99

SG Flensburg-Handewitt

- DHB-Pokal
  - Winner (1): 2005

HSG Nordhorn

- EHF Cup
  - Winner (1): 2008

Individual

- Franjo Bučar State Award for Sport - 2004

== Orders ==
- Order of Danica Hrvatska with face of Franjo Bučar - 2004
