= Sursee Stadthalle =

Indoor sporting arena

Coordinates: 47.1748°N 8.1079°E

Sursee Stadthalle is an indoor sporting arena located in Sursee, Switzerland. The capacity of the arena is 3,500 people. It hosted some matches at the 2006 European Men's Handball Championship.
