= Kjetil Strand =

Norwegian handball player (born 1979)

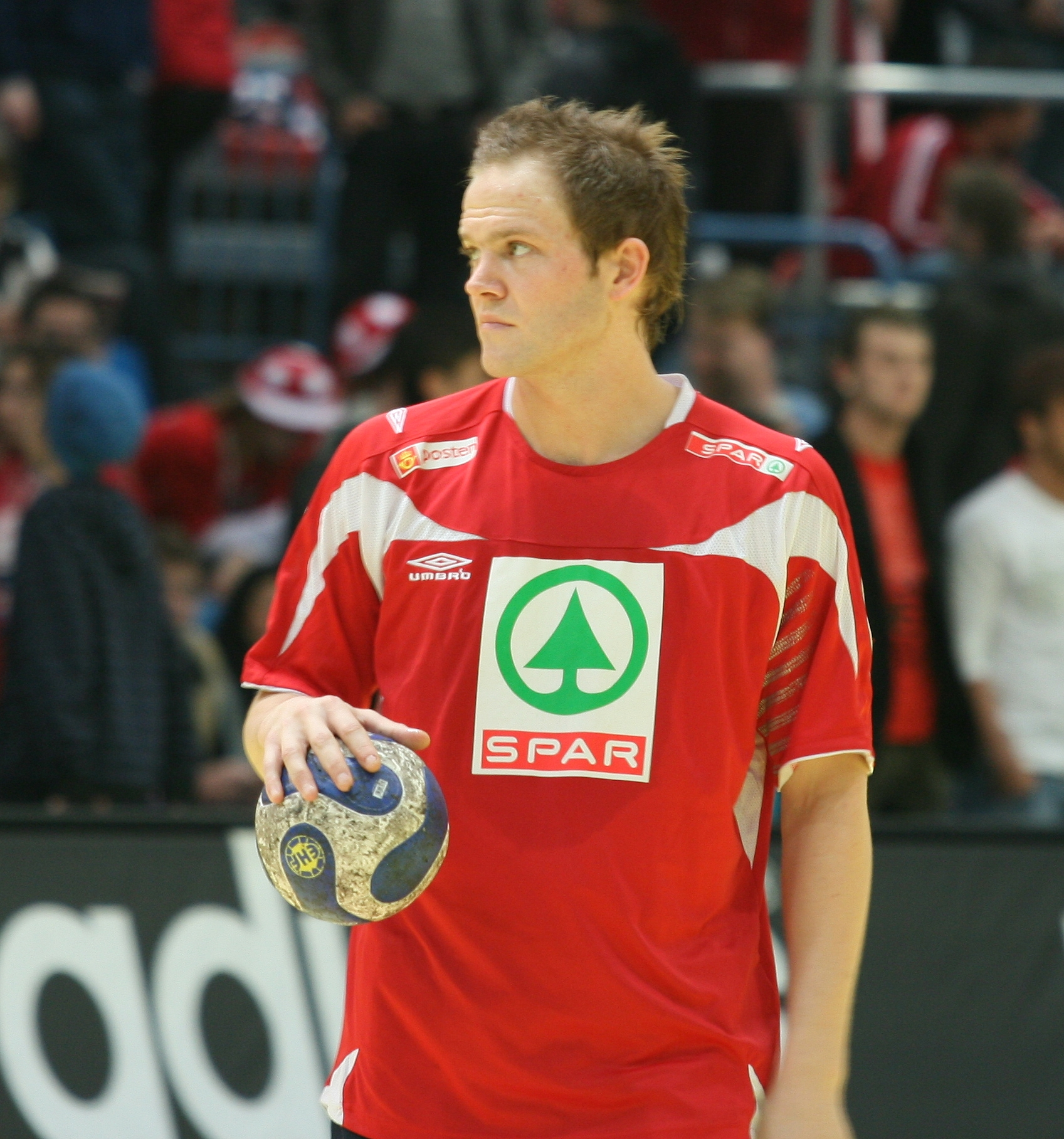
- Kjetil Strand under 2008 European Men's Handball Championship in Stavanger

Personal information
- Full name: Kjetil Øvrelid Strand
- Nationality: Norwegian
- Born: 2 October 1979 (age 47) Stavanger, Norway
- Height: 1.88 m (6 ft 2 in)

Sport
- Sport: Handball
- Position: Mid Back

Senior clubs
- Years: Team
- -2003: Stavanger Håndball
- 2003-2004: SG Flensburg-Handewitt
- 2004-2006: Bjerringbro-Silkeborg Håndbold
- 2006-2007: AaB Håndbold
- 2007-2010: Füchse Berlin
- 2010-2013: Stavanger Håndball
National team
Years	Team	Apps	(Gls)
2000–2013	Norway	102	(473)

Kjetil Øvrelid Strand (born 2 October 1979) is a Norwegian former handball player. Strand played for Bjerringbro Silkeborg in Denmark before the 2006 European Championship. Afterwards he signed a contract with AaB Håndbold.

On 2 February 2006 he scored 19 goals, a Norwegian record, in a Main Group Stage game against Iceland in the European Championship. Strand also holds the record for number of goals scored in a single season in the Norwegian league: 281. He set the record while playing for Stavanger Håndball in 2002/2003 season. In 2003 he was awarded Player of the year in Norwegian handball.

== Career ==
Kjetil Strand started his professional career at Stavanger Håndball. There he made his breakthrough in the 2002/03 season, where he scored 281 goals in 25 games and became the league top scorer and handballer of the year. In the winter of 2003 he was approached by TBV Lemgo in the German Handball-Bundesliga, but moved to Flensburg-Handewitt instead. Here he played a single season, where he won the German Bundesliga. He then moved to Danish side Bjerringbro-Silkeborg. In 2006 he moved to league rivals AaB Håndbold. In 2007 he returned to Germany to join Füchse Berlin. In 2010 he announced that he would not extend his contract and moved back to Stavanger Håndbold, where he finished his career in 2013, after suffrenting from multiple injuries in his last years

He played 102 matches the Norway men's national handball team. At the 2005 World Men's Handball Championship he was part of the team that finished 7th. Two years later he represented them at the 2007 World Men's Handball Championship, where they finished 13th. He missed dthe 2012 European Men's Handball Championship due to an achilles injury, that needed surgery.
