= Iker Romero =

Spanish handball player (born 1980)

Romero
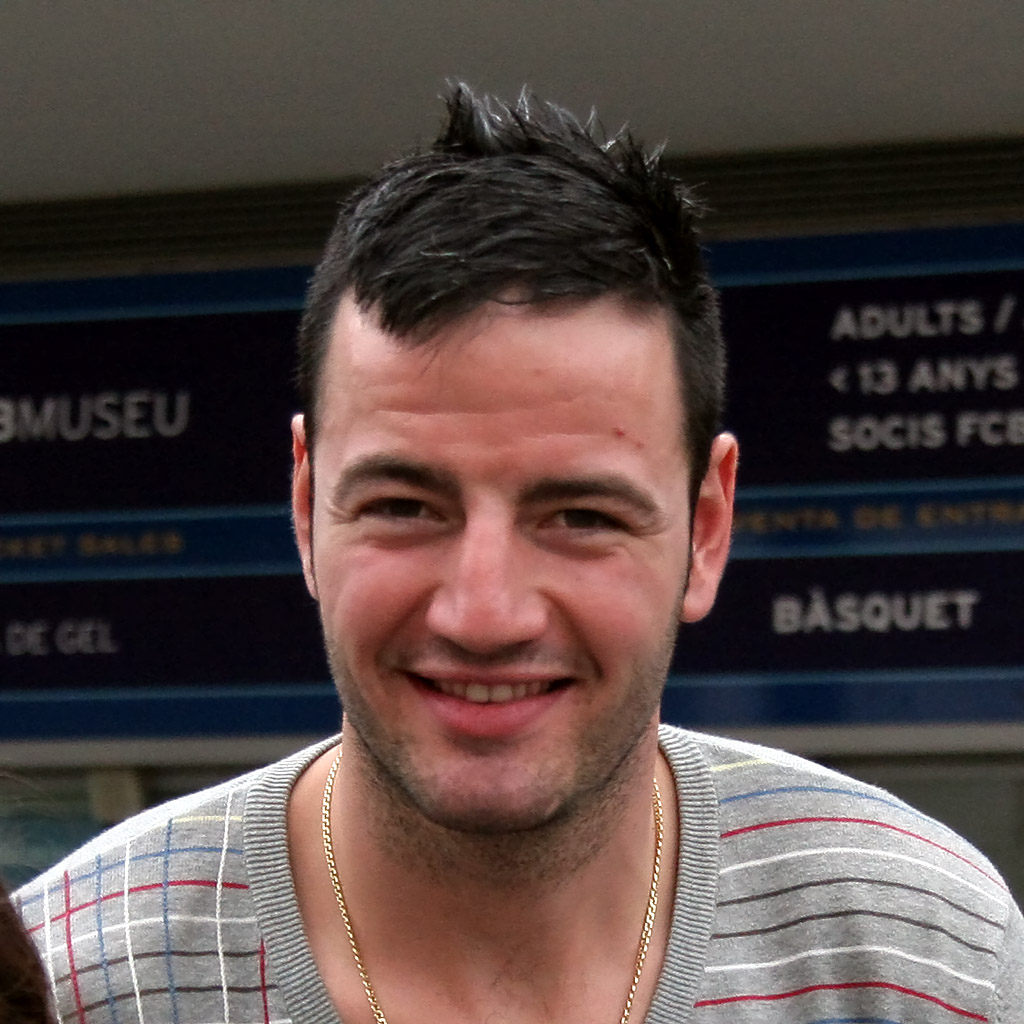
- Romero in 2008.

Personal information
- Full name: Iker Romero Fernández
- Born: 15 June 1980 (age 46) Vitoria-Gasteiz, Álava, Basque Country, Spain
- Height: 1.97 m (6 ft 6 in)

Sport
- Sport: Handball
- Position: Left Back
- Current club: TSV Hannover-Burgdorf

Youth career
- Years: Team
- –1997: Corazonistas Vitoria

Senior clubs
- Years: Team
- 1997–2000: BM Valladolid
- 2000–2001: Ademar León
- 2001–2003: Ciudad Real
- 2003–2011: FC Barcelona
- 2011–2015: Füchse Berlin
National team
Years	Team	Apps	(Gls)
2001–2014	Spain	200	(753)

Teams managed
- 2017–2021: Hannover-Burgdorf (assistant coach)
- 2021–: SG BBM Bietigheim
- 2025–: Austria men's national handball team
Medal record
Summer Olympics
Bronze medal – third place	2008 Beijing	National team
World Championship
Gold medal – first place	2005 Tunisia	National team
Bronze medal – third place	2011 Sweden	National team
European Championship
Silver medal – second place	2006 Switzerland	National team

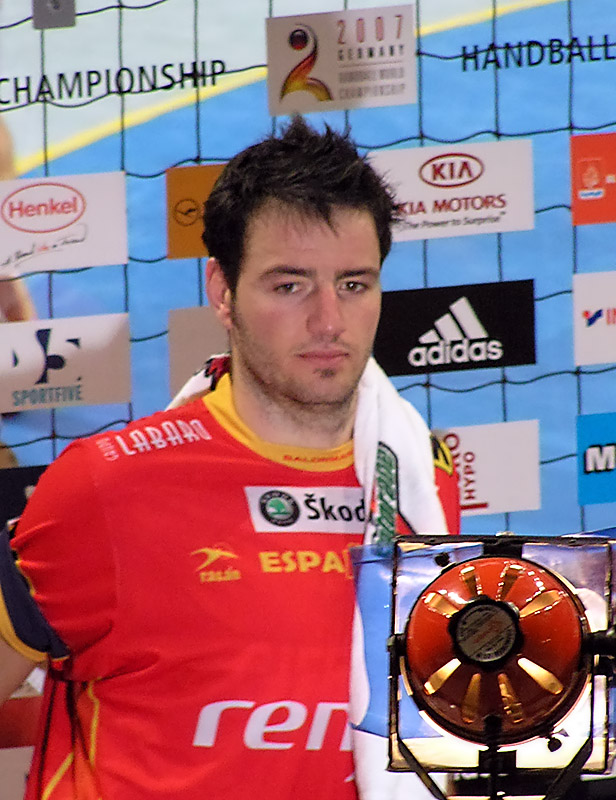
Iker Romero at the 2007 World Championship in Germany

Iker Romero Fernández (born 15 June 1980) is a retired Spanish handball player, currently working as the head coach of SG BBM Bietigheim and the Austria men's national handball team.

He won the World Men's Handball Championship in 2005 with the Spain men's national handball team in Tunisia.

== Career ==
Iker Romero signed his first professional contract in 1997 with BM Valladolid. In 2000 he signed for Ademar León, where he won the Spanish Championship in 2001. The same year he signed for BM Ciudad Real. Here he won the 2003 Copa del Rey and the 2002 and 2003 EHF Cup Winners' Cup. In 2003 he signed for FC Barcelona, where he won the 2006 and 2007 Spanish Championship, the 2004 Copa del Rey, the 2004 and 2007 European Supercup and the 2005 and 2011 EHF Champions League.

In 2011 he moved to Germany to join Füchse Berlin, where he won the 2013-14 DHB-Pokal and the 2014-15 EHF European League. In April 2014 he announced that he would retire at the end of season and move back to Spain, but decided to stay for one more year in Berlin before retiring.

== Coaching career ==
In 2017 he became the assistant coach at the German Handball-Bundesliga club TSV Hannover-Burgdorf.

From the 2021-22 season he became the head coach of SG BBM Bietigheim. Starting with the 2025-2026 season, he also manages the Austria men's national handball team.

== Private life ==
He is married to the German former handball player Laura Steinbach.
