= 2013 European Kendo Championships =

The 25th European Kendo Championships was held in Berlin, Germany 12–14 April 2013.

== Results ==
Event	Gold	Silver	Bronze
Women's Individual	Safiyah Fadai (GER)	Sayo Van Der Woude (NED)	Ana Momcilovic (SRB); Marina Böviz (HUN)
Women's Team	Germany	France	Netherlands; Hungary
Men's individual	Giuseppe Giannetto (ITA)	Koichi Nakabayashi (FRA)	Sándor Dubi (HUN); Andrew M.G. Fisher (GBR)
Men's Team	France	Belgium	Hungary; Spain

=== Medals table ===
Rank	Nation	Gold	Silver	Bronze	Total
1	Germany	2	0	0	2
2	France	1	2	0	3
3	Italy	1	0	0	1
4	Netherlands	0	1	1	2
5	Belgium	0	1	0	1
6	Hungary	0	0	4	4
7	Great Britain	0	0	1	1
7	Serbia	0	0	1	1
7	Spain	0	0	1	1
Totals (9 entries)		4	4	8	16

== Participating nations ==
- Austria
- Belgium
- Czech Republic
- Denmark
- Finland
- France
- Georgia
- Germany
- Great Britain
- Greece
- Hungary
- Ireland
- Italy
- Latvia
- Lithuania
- Malta
- Montenegro
- Netherlands
- Norway
- Poland
- Romania
- Russia
- Serbia
- Spain
- Sweden
- Switzerland
- Turkey
- Ukraine
