= Joachim Boldsen =

Danish handball player (born 1978)

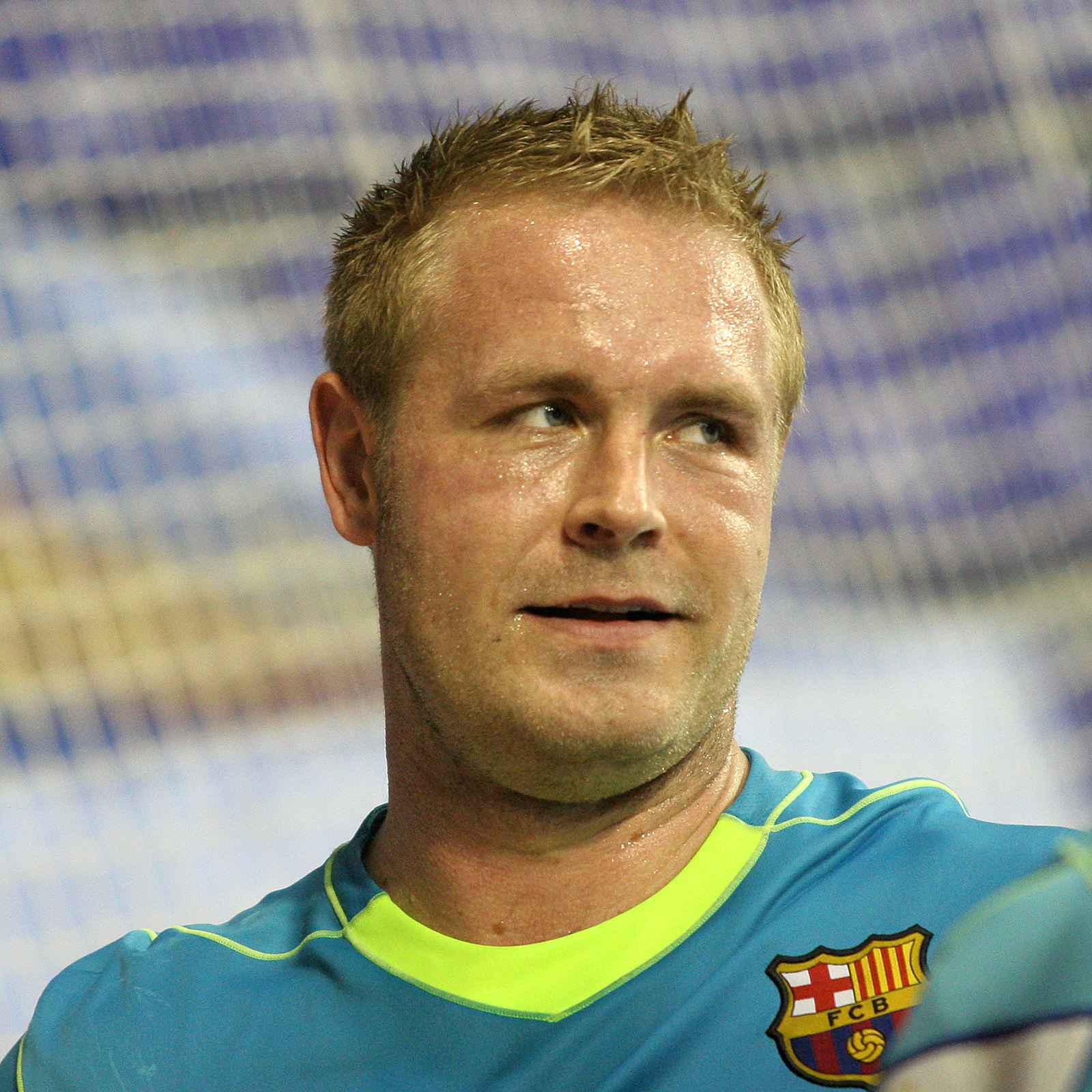
- Boldsen in 2008

Personal information
- Nationality: Danish
- Born: 30 April 1978 (age 48) Helsingør, Denmark
- Height: 1.87 m (6 ft 2 in)

Sport
- Sport: Handball
- Position: Centre Back
- Current club: Retired

Senior clubs
- Years: Team
- 1993–1997: Helsingør IF
- 1997–1999: GOG
- 1999–2001: TV Großwallstadt
- 2001: Ajax Farum
- 2001–2007: SG Flensburg-Handewitt
- 2007–2008: AaB Håndbold
- 2008–2010: FC Barcelona
- 2010–2012: AG København
- 2012–2014: KIF Kolding København
National team
Years	Team	Apps	(Gls)
1998–2008	Denmark	186	(405)
Medal record
Men's Handball
Representing Denmark
World Championships
Bronze medal – third place	2007 Germany	Team
European Championships
Gold medal – first place	2008 Norway	Team
Bronze medal – third place	2002 Sweden	Team
Bronze medal – third place	2004 Slovenia	Team
Bronze medal – third place	2006 Switzerland	Team
Junior World Championship
Gold medal – first place	1997 Turkey	Team

Joachim Boldsen (born 30 April 1978) is a Danish former team handball player. He is European Champion by winning the 2008 European Men's Handball Championship with the Danish national handball team.

Boldsen recently played for KIF Kolding København, and has previously played for Danish Handball League side AaB Håndbold and Spanish league side FC Barcelona.

== Career ==
=== Club career ===
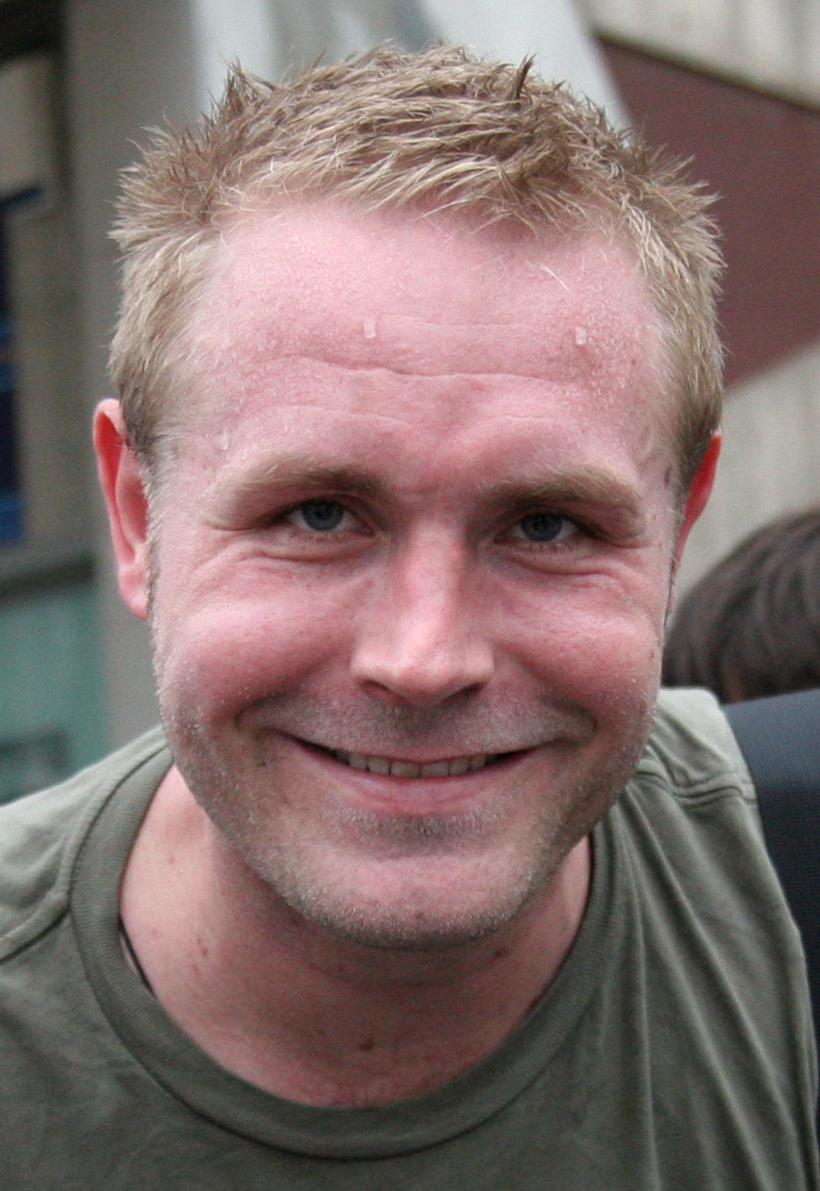
Boldsen in 2008

In Boldsen's earliest career, he played for such clubs as Helsingør IF (from 1993), GOG Gudme (two seasons, 1997–1999), TV Großwallstadt (two seasons, 1999–2001), and Ajax Farum. In 1997 he won the Danish Men's Handball Cup with GOG and was named MVP for the tournament. From 2001 to 2007, he played with the German first league team SG Flensburg-Handewitt, helping them to win their first championship in 2004. He won the DHB-Pokal with Flensburg in 2003, 2004 and 2005. In 2007, he changed to Danish Handball League team AaB Håndbold for a single season before switching to FC Barcelona Handbol. With FC Barcelona, he won the Spanish Supercup in 2008/2009. In 2010 he changed for Danish team AG Håndbold. Here he won the Danish championship two times and made it to final4 in champions league.

=== National handball team career ===
Boldsen had his debut on the Danish national handball team on August 23, 1998, and in the following ten years he played 186 matches for the team, scoring 405 goals. On September 30, 2008, he announced that he was resigning from the national team due to the increased traveling hours following his change to FC Barcelona. In his career, he was part of winning the 2008 European Championship, and part of the bronze winning team in the 2007 World Championship as well as bronze in the European Championships in 2002, 2004, and 2006. Boldsen played at the 2008 Summer Olympics in Beijing, where Denmark reached the quarter-finals, and placed seventh after being eliminated by Croatia.

As a junior, Boldsen became Junior European Champion with Denmark in 1996, and Junior World Champion in 1997.

== Personal life ==
Boldsen is the son of former national-team handball player, Steen Boldsen. He is married to Nancy Rietveld Boldsen, with whom he has the daughter Fleur. He has participated in TV 2's Vild med dans, the Danish version of Dancing with the Stars, but had to withdraw due to an injury he got at handball practice.
