= Kreuzbleichhalle =

Coordinates: 47.420°N 9.362°E

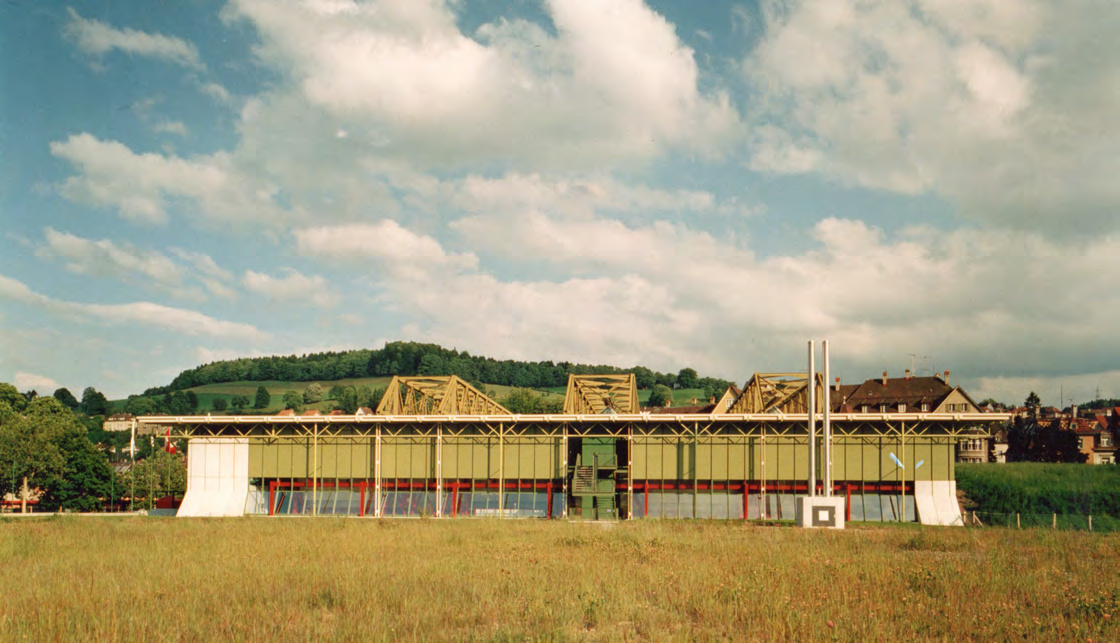
Sporthalle Kreuzbleiche

Kreuzbleichhalle (Sporthalle Kreuzbleiche) is an indoor sporting arena located in St. Gallen, Switzerland. The capacity of the arena is 4,000 people. It hosted some matches at the 2006 European Men's Handball Championship and is the home arena of the TSV St. Otmar team handball club.
