= Christian Zeitz =

German handball player (born 1980)

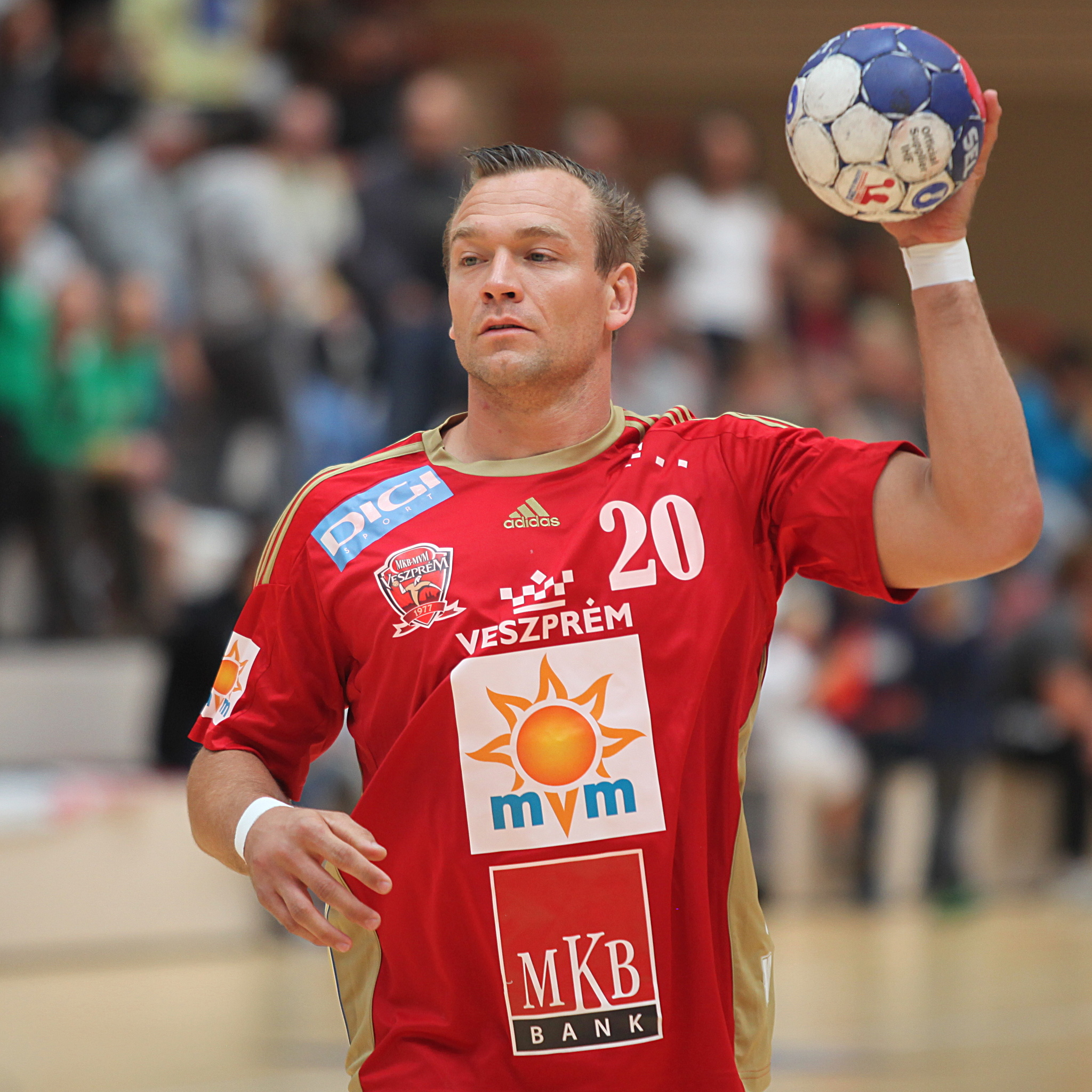
- Zeitz playing for Veszprém in 2014.

Personal information
- Nationality: German
- Born: 18 October 1980 (age 46) Heidelberg, West Germany
- Height: 1.86 m (6 ft 1 in)

Sport
- Sport: Handball
- Position: Right back

Senior clubs
- Years: Team
- 1986–2002: TSV Östringen
- 2002–2003: SG Kronau-Östringen
- 2002–2003: SG Wallau-Massenheim
- 2003–2014: THW Kiel
- 2014–2016: MVM Veszprém
- 2016–2018: THW Kiel
- 2018–2020: SG Nußloch
- 2020: TVB 1898 Stuttgart
- 2020–2022: GWD Minden
National team
Years	Team	Apps	(Gls)
2001–2008	Germany	166	(458)
Medal record
Olympic Games
Silver medal – second place	2004 Athens	Team competition
World Championship
Gold medal – first place	2007 Germany	Team competition
Silver medal – second place	2003 Portugal	Team competition
European Championship
Gold medal – first place	2004 Slovenia	Team competition
Silver medal – second place	2002 Sweden	Team competition

Christian Zeitz (born 18 November 1980 in Heidelberg) is a former German handball player.

Zeitz received a silver medal at the 2004 Summer Olympics in Athens with the German national team. He is World Champion from 2007, and European champion from 2004.

He was known for an unconventional playing style, often called 'street handball'.

== Career ==
Zeitz began playing handball aged 6 with his two older brothers. At 18 he became a part of the first team at TSV Östringen in the 2. Bundesliga. When the tem fused with TSG Kronau to SG Kronau-Östringen, he followed. With the club he was promoted to the 1st Bundesliga.

He then joined THW Kiel, where he won the German Championship 9 times, the DHB-Pokal 6 times and the EHF Champions League 3 times.

He then joined Hungarian MKB-MVM Veszprém. Here he won the Hungarian double two teams and the Hungarian Super Cup three times.

From the 2016-17 season he returned to THW Kiel, where he once again won the DHB-Pokal. On 16 February 2018 he was suspended from the club due to disagreements on the exact lengths of his contract. In court the parts agreed to terminate the contract at the end of the season. The club also had to pay Zeitz 75.000 euroes. Afterwards the club faced criticism from its fans, when they removed his portrait from the club history gallery.

At the end of the affair he joined SG Nußloch in the 3. Liga. In February 2020 after the bankruptcy of SG Nußloch, he returned to the Bundesliga to join TVB 1898 Stuttgart for the rest of the season. The following season he joined GWD Minden. In November 2022 he announced his retirement.

== Titles ==
=== Club ===
With THW Kiel

- German Super Cup
  - Winner: 2001
- German Championship
  - Winner: 2005, 2006, 2007, 2008, 2009, 2010, 2012, 2013, 2014
- German Cup
  - Winner: 2007, 2008, 2009, 2011, 2012, 2013, 2017
- EHF European League
  - Winner: 2004
- EHF Champions League
  - Winner: 2007, 2010, 2012
- Super Globe
  - Winner: 2011

With KC Veszprém

- Hungarian Championship
  - Winner: 2015, 2016
- Hungarian Cup
  - Winner: 2015, 2016
- SEHA League
  - Winner: 2015, 2016

=== National team ===
- European Men's Handball Championship
  - Winner: 2004
  - Silver: 2002
- World Men's Handball Championship
  - Winner: 2007
  - Silver: 2003
- Olympics
  - Silver: 2004
