= Wankdorfhalle =

Indoor sporting arena in Bern, Switzerland

Coordinates: 46.964919°N 7.466213°E

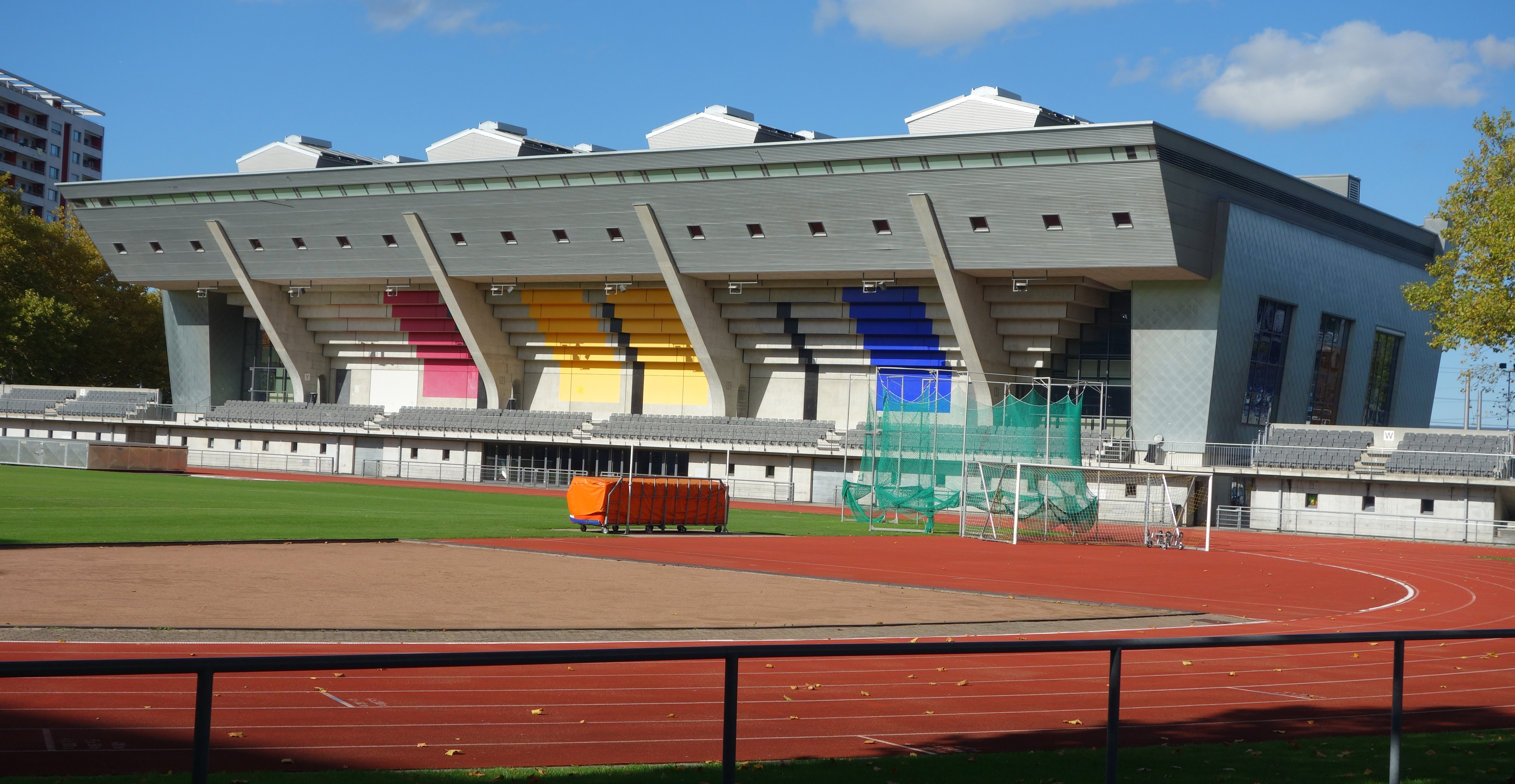
Wankdorfhalle, northeast side and grounds

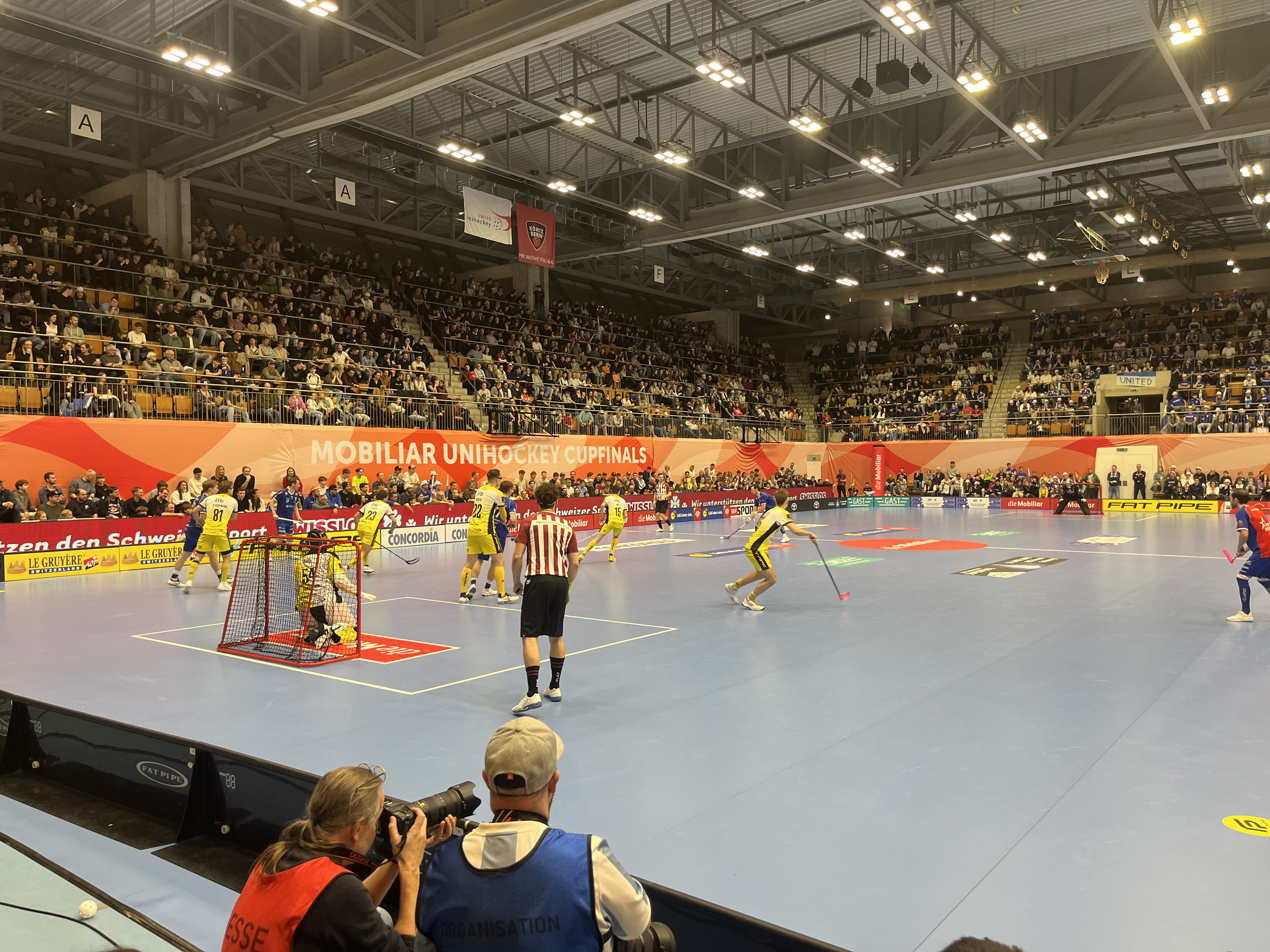
The Wankdorfhalle during the Swiss Floorball Cup final between HC Rychenberg Winterthur and Zug United

The Wankdorfhalle is an indoor sporting arena near the Stadion Wankdorf football stadium in Bern, Switzerland. The triple arena capacity for up to 2560 seated and 500 standing spectators. It hosted some matches at the 2006 European Men's Handball Championship and the home games of BSV Bern Muri and Bern Capitals.

In 2012, the Wankdorfhalle began using a robot to clean the three courts. The robot was called Bodenwart 240 (lit. 'Groundskeeper 240') and made by the company Infrasport.
