= 2010–11 EHF Champions League =

European handball tournament

EHF Champions League
- 2010–11

Tournament information
- Sport: Handball
- Location: Lanxess Arena (FINAL4)
- Dates: 3 September 2010–29 May 2011
- Teams: 32 (qualification stage); 24 (group stage); 16 (knockout stage)

Final positions
- Champions: (Spain) FC Barcelona Borges (8th title)
- Runner-up: (Spain) BM Ciudad Real

Tournament statistics
- Matches played: 154
- Goals scored: 9642 (62.61 per match)
- Attendance: 729,387 (4,736 per match)
- Top scorer: (Germany) Uwe Gensheimer (118)

The 2010–11 EHF Champions League was the 51st edition of Europe's premier club handball tournament and the eighteenth edition under the current EHF Champions League format. THW Kiel were the defending champions. The final four was played on 28–29 May 2011 at the Lanxess Arena at Cologne, Germany.

FC Barcelona Borges defeated BM Ciudad Real in the final to win the title for the 8th time.

== Draw ==
The draw for the group stage took place at the Liechtenstein Museum in Vienna on 22 June 2010. A total of 24 teams were drawn into four groups of six. Teams were divided into four pots, based on EHF coefficients. Clubs from the same pot or the same association cannot be drawn into the same group.

Each team played against each other in its group twice. The top two in each group proceeded to the knockout stage, and the third-placed teams entered the EHF Cup's Winners Cup Round of 32.

Key to colors in group tables
Top two places advanced to the first knockout round
Third place entered the EHF Cup's Winner Cup at the round of 32
Fourth place is eliminated from continental competitions

== Qualification stage ==
A total of eight teams took part in the Qualification Tournaments. The clubs were drawn into two groups of four. The winner of Qualification Group 1 qualified into Group B, the winner of Qualification Group 2 qualified into Group C. Play was scheduled at 3/4/5 September 2010. The matches of Group 1 were played at Bregenz, Austria. Group 2 played their games at Porto, Portugal.

=== Groups ===
Group A	Group B
(Slovakia) HT Tatran Prešov (Norway) Drammen HK (Austria) A1 Bregenz (Turkey) Beşiktaş JK	(North Macedonia) RK Metalurg Skopje (Ukraine) ZTR Zaporizhzhia (Belarus) HC Dinamo-Minsk (Portugal) FC Porto

==== Group 1 ====
Team	Pld	W	D	L	GF	GA	GD	Pts
(Slovakia) HT Tatran Prešov	3	2	1	0	92	87	+5	5
(Austria) A1 Bregenz	3	2	0	1	90	85	+5	4
(Turkey) Beşiktaş J.K.	3	1	0	2	85	91	−6	2
(Norway) Drammen HK	3	0	1	2	94	98	−4	1

All times are local (UTC+2)

3 September 2010; 18:00	Drammen HK (Norway)	29 – 30	(Turkey) Beşiktaş J.K.	Sporthalle Rieden-Vorkloster, Bregenz; Attendance: 300; Referees: Nikolic, Stojkovic (Serbia)
3 September 2010; 18:00	Hansen, Hykkerud 7	(13–14)	Ladyko	Sporthalle Rieden-Vorkloster, Bregenz; Attendance: 300; Referees: Nikolic, Stojkovic (Serbia)
3 September 2010; 18:00	3× (yellow card) 6× (suspension)	Report	3× (yellow card) 6× (suspension)	Sporthalle Rieden-Vorkloster, Bregenz; Attendance: 300; Referees: Nikolic, Stojkovic (Serbia)

3 September 2010; 20:00	HT Tatran Prešov (Slovakia)	27 – 25	(Austria) A1 Bregenz	Sporthalle Rieden-Vorkloster, Bregenz; Attendance: 1,200; Referees: Dentz, Reibel (France)
3 September 2010; 20:00	Radčenko, Sobol 6	(12–14)	Wagesreiter	Sporthalle Rieden-Vorkloster, Bregenz; Attendance: 1,200; Referees: Dentz, Reibel (France)
3 September 2010; 20:00	3× (yellow card) 8× (suspension) 1× (red card)	Report	3× (yellow card) 5× (suspension)	Sporthalle Rieden-Vorkloster, Bregenz; Attendance: 1,200; Referees: Dentz, Reibel (France)

4 September 2010; 18:00	Beşiktaş J.K. (Turkey)	27 – 30	(Slovakia) HT Tatran Prešov	Sporthalle Rieden-Vorkloster, Bregenz; Attendance: 400; Referees: Nikolic, Stojkovic (Serbia)
4 September 2010; 18:00	Döne 7	(12–14)	Antl 8	Sporthalle Rieden-Vorkloster, Bregenz; Attendance: 400; Referees: Nikolic, Stojkovic (Serbia)
4 September 2010; 18:00	2× (yellow card) 7× (suspension) 1× (red card)	Report	3× (yellow card) 5× (suspension)	Sporthalle Rieden-Vorkloster, Bregenz; Attendance: 400; Referees: Nikolic, Stojkovic (Serbia)

4 September 2010; 20:00	A1 Bregenz (Austria)	33 – 30	(Norway) Drammen HK	Sporthalle Rieden-Vorkloster, Bregenz; Attendance: 1,300; Referees: Dentz, Reibel (France)
4 September 2010; 20:00	Banić 11	(17–16)	Spanne 7	Sporthalle Rieden-Vorkloster, Bregenz; Attendance: 1,300; Referees: Dentz, Reibel (France)
4 September 2010; 20:00	3× (yellow card) 5× (suspension)	Report	3× (yellow card) 8× (suspension) 1× (red card)	Sporthalle Rieden-Vorkloster, Bregenz; Attendance: 1,300; Referees: Dentz, Reibel (France)

5 September 2010; 14:00	HT Tatran Prešov (Slovakia)	35 – 35	(Norway) Drammen HK	Sporthalle Rieden-Vorkloster, Bregenz; Attendance: 250; Referees: Dentz, Reibel (France)
5 September 2010; 14:00	Krok 9	(14–17)	Spanne, Hykkerud 6	Sporthalle Rieden-Vorkloster, Bregenz; Attendance: 250; Referees: Dentz, Reibel (France)
5 September 2010; 14:00	3× (yellow card) 5× (suspension)	Report	3× (yellow card) 7× (suspension)	Sporthalle Rieden-Vorkloster, Bregenz; Attendance: 250; Referees: Dentz, Reibel (France)

5 September 2010; 16:00	A1 Bregenz (Austria)	32 – 28	(Turkey) Beşiktaş J.K.	Sporthalle Rieden-Vorkloster, Bregenz; Attendance: 1,100; Referees: Nikolic, Stojkovic (Serbia)
5 September 2010; 16:00	Wagesreiter 10	(16–13)	Arifoğlu 5	Sporthalle Rieden-Vorkloster, Bregenz; Attendance: 1,100; Referees: Nikolic, Stojkovic (Serbia)
5 September 2010; 16:00	3× (yellow card) 5× (suspension)	Report	3× (yellow card) 5× (suspension)	Sporthalle Rieden-Vorkloster, Bregenz; Attendance: 1,100; Referees: Nikolic, Stojkovic (Serbia)

==== Group 2 ====
Team	Pld	W	D	L	GF	GA	GD	Pts
(Belarus) HC Dinamo-Minsk	3	2	1	0	79	72	+7	5
(Portugal) FC Porto/Vitalis	3	1	2	0	74	67	+7	4
(Ukraine) ZTR Zaporizhzhia	3	1	0	2	73	79	−6	2
(North Macedonia) RK Metalurg Skopje	3	0	1	2	68	76	−8	1

All times are local (UTC+1)

3 September 2010; 18:30	ZTR Zaporizhzhia (Ukraine)	20 – 27	(Portugal) FC Porto/Vitalis	Dragão Caixa, Porto; Attendance: 674; Referees: Canbro, Claesson (Sweden)
3 September 2010; 18:30	Ganchev, Kysil 5	(9–14)	Davyes, Moreira 6	Dragão Caixa, Porto; Attendance: 674; Referees: Canbro, Claesson (Sweden)
3 September 2010; 18:30	3× (yellow card) 4× (suspension)	Report	3× (yellow card) 3× (suspension)	Dragão Caixa, Porto; Attendance: 674; Referees: Canbro, Claesson (Sweden)

3 September 2010; 20:30	RK Metalurg Skopje (North Macedonia)	21 – 27	(Belarus) HC Dinamo-Minsk	Dragão Caixa, Porto; Attendance: 214; Referees: Gjeding, Hansen (Denmark)
3 September 2010; 20:30	Mojsovski, Rakčević 4	(10–12)	Onufryienko 6	Dragão Caixa, Porto; Attendance: 214; Referees: Gjeding, Hansen (Denmark)
3 September 2010; 20:30	3× (yellow card) 3× (suspension)	Report	3× (yellow card) 6× (suspension)	Dragão Caixa, Porto; Attendance: 214; Referees: Gjeding, Hansen (Denmark)

4 September 2010; 15:00	FC Porto/Vitalis (Portugal)	24 – 24	(North Macedonia) RK Metalurg Skopje	Dragão Caixa, Porto; Attendance: 1,200; Referees: Gjeding, Hansen (Denmark)
4 September 2010; 15:00	Moreira 7	(14–10)	Alusovski, Mojsoski 6	Dragão Caixa, Porto; Attendance: 1,200; Referees: Gjeding, Hansen (Denmark)
4 September 2010; 15:00	2× (yellow card) 4× (suspension)	Report	3× (yellow card) 5× (suspension)	Dragão Caixa, Porto; Attendance: 1,200; Referees: Gjeding, Hansen (Denmark)

4 September 2010; 17:00	HC Dinamo-Minsk (Belarus)	29 – 28	(Ukraine) ZTR Zaporizhzhia	Dragão Caixa, Porto; Attendance: 280; Referees: Canbro, Claesson (Sweden)
4 September 2010; 17:00	Kazhaneuski 9	(15–17)	Stetsyura 9	Dragão Caixa, Porto; Attendance: 280; Referees: Canbro, Claesson (Sweden)
4 September 2010; 17:00	3× (yellow card) 6× (suspension)	Report	3× (yellow card) 8× (suspension) 1× (red card)	Dragão Caixa, Porto; Attendance: 280; Referees: Canbro, Claesson (Sweden)

5 September 2010; 15:00	RK Metalurg Skopje (North Macedonia)	23 – 25	(Ukraine) ZTR Zaporizhzhia	Dragão Caixa, Porto; Attendance: 500; Referees: Canbro, Claesson (Sweden)
5 September 2010; 15:00	Levov, Mirkulovski 4	(12–15)	Stetsyura 9	Dragão Caixa, Porto; Attendance: 500; Referees: Canbro, Claesson (Sweden)
5 September 2010; 15:00	3× (yellow card) 9× (suspension) 1× (red card)	Report	3× (yellow card) 5× (suspension)	Dragão Caixa, Porto; Attendance: 500; Referees: Canbro, Claesson (Sweden)

5 September 2010; 17:00	HC Dinamo-Minsk (Belarus)	23 – 23	(Portugal) FC Porto/Vitalis	Dragão Caixa, Porto; Attendance: 2,000; Referees: Gjeding, Hansen (Denmark)
5 September 2010; 17:00	Kazhaneuski, Onufryienko 6	(13–10)	Mota 7	Dragão Caixa, Porto; Attendance: 2,000; Referees: Gjeding, Hansen (Denmark)
5 September 2010; 17:00	2× (yellow card) 6× (suspension)	Report	3× (yellow card) 3× (suspension)	Dragão Caixa, Porto; Attendance: 2,000; Referees: Gjeding, Hansen (Denmark)

=== Wild Card Round ===
Four teams participated played for one place in EHF Champions League Group A. The games were played at the Europahalle in Karlsruhe, Germany.

Team	Pld	W	D	L	GF	GA	GD	Pts
(Germany) Rhein-Neckar Löwen	3	3	0	0	97	80	+17	6
(Denmark) Bjerringbro-Silkeborg	3	2	0	1	84	85	−1	4
(Spain) Reale Ademar	3	1	0	2	79	91	−12	2
(Slovenia) RK Gorenje Velenje	3	0	0	3	77	91	−14	0

All times are local (UTC+2)

3 September 2010; 18:00	Reale Ademar (Spain)	26 – 27	(Denmark) Bjerringbro-Silkeborg	Europahalle, Karlsruhe; Attendance: 500; Referees: Horacek, Novotny (Czech Republic)
3 September 2010; 18:00	Čutura 6	(16–15)	Lauge 6	Europahalle, Karlsruhe; Attendance: 500; Referees: Horacek, Novotny (Czech Republic)
3 September 2010; 18:00	3× (yellow card)	Report	3× (yellow card) 4× (suspension)	Europahalle, Karlsruhe; Attendance: 500; Referees: Horacek, Novotny (Czech Republic)

3 September 2010; 20:15	Rhein-Neckar Löwen (Germany)	33 – 28	(Slovenia) RK Gorenje Velenje	Europahalle, Karlsruhe; Attendance: 2,000; Referees: Leifsson, Palsson (Iceland)
3 September 2010; 20:15	Gensheimer 11	(20–13)	Gams 8	Europahalle, Karlsruhe; Attendance: 2,000; Referees: Leifsson, Palsson (Iceland)
3 September 2010; 20:15	3× (yellow card) 5× (suspension) 1× (red card)	Report	3× (yellow card) 6× (suspension)	Europahalle, Karlsruhe; Attendance: 2,000; Referees: Leifsson, Palsson (Iceland)

4 September 2010; 17:00	RK Gorenje Velenje (Slovenia)	21 – 27	(Spain) Reale Ademar	Europahalle, Karlsruhe; Attendance: 800; Referees: Leifsson, Palsson (Iceland)
4 September 2010; 17:00	Cehte, Šimič 6	(12–15)	Buntić 5	Europahalle, Karlsruhe; Attendance: 800; Referees: Leifsson, Palsson (Iceland)
4 September 2010; 17:00	3× (yellow card) 2× (suspension) 1× (red card)	Report	2× (yellow card) 4× (suspension)	Europahalle, Karlsruhe; Attendance: 800; Referees: Leifsson, Palsson (Iceland)

4 September 2010; 19:30	Bjerringbro-Silkeborg (Denmark)	26 – 31	(Germany) Rhein-Neckar Löwen	Europahalle, Karlsruhe; Attendance: 2,300; Referees: Horacek, Novotny (Czech Republic)
4 September 2010; 19:30	Back, Lauge 5	(13–17)	Čupić 8	Europahalle, Karlsruhe; Attendance: 2,300; Referees: Horacek, Novotny (Czech Republic)
4 September 2010; 19:30	3× (yellow card) 6× (suspension)	Report	2× (yellow card) 4× (suspension)	Europahalle, Karlsruhe; Attendance: 2,300; Referees: Horacek, Novotny (Czech Republic)

5 September 2010; 15:00	Bjerringbro-Silkeborg (Denmark)	31 – 28	(Slovenia) RK Gorenje Velenje	Europahalle, Karlsruhe; Attendance: 900; Referees: Horacek, Novotny (Czech Republic)
5 September 2010; 15:00	Petersen 9	(18–16)	Manojlović, Šimič 6	Europahalle, Karlsruhe; Attendance: 900; Referees: Horacek, Novotny (Czech Republic)
5 September 2010; 15:00	3× (yellow card) 2× (suspension)	Report	2× (yellow card) 5× (suspension) 1× (red card)	Europahalle, Karlsruhe; Attendance: 900; Referees: Horacek, Novotny (Czech Republic)

5 September 2010; 17:45	Reale Ademar (Spain)	26 – 33	(Germany) Rhein-Neckar Löwen	Europahalle, Karlsruhe; Attendance: 2,500; Referees: Leifsson, Palsson (Iceland)
5 September 2010; 17:45	García Vega, Montoro, Ortigosa 4	(9–15)	Gensheimer 6	Europahalle, Karlsruhe; Attendance: 2,500; Referees: Leifsson, Palsson (Iceland)
5 September 2010; 17:45	3× (yellow card) 6× (suspension)	Report	3× (yellow card) 2× (suspension)	Europahalle, Karlsruhe; Attendance: 2,500; Referees: Leifsson, Palsson (Iceland)

== Group stage ==
=== Groups ===
Group A	Group B	Group C	Group D
(Germany) THW Kiel (Slovenia) Celje Laško (Spain) F.C. Barcelona Borges (France) Chambéry Savoie (Germany) Rhein-Neckar Löwen (Poland) Vive Targi Kielce	(Hungary) MKB Veszprém (France) Montpellier HB (Germany) HSV Hamburg (Denmark) KIF Kolding (Sweden) IK Sävehof (Slovakia) HT Tatran Prešov	(Russia) Chekhovskiye Medvedi (Denmark) AaB Handball (Hungary) Pick Szeged (Spain) BM Valladolid (Switzerland) Kadetten Schaffhausen (Belarus) HC Dinamo-Minsk	(Spain) BM Ciudad Real (Croatia) RK Zagreb (Russia) St. Petersburg HC (Germany) SG Flensburg-Handewitt (Bosnia and Herzegovina) RK Bosna Sarajevo (Romania) HCM Constanța

==== Group A ====
Team	Pld	W	D	L	GF	GA	GD	Pts
(Germany) THW Kiel	10	7	2	1	326	277	+49	16
(Germany) Rhein-Neckar Löwen	10	5	3	2	307	292	+15	13
(Spain) F.C. Barcelona Borges	10	5	3	2	327	290	+37	13
(France) Chambéry Savoie	10	4	0	6	262	307	−45	8
(Slovenia) Celje Laško	10	3	0	7	300	332	−32	6
(Poland) Vive Targi Kielce	10	1	2	7	276	300	−24	4

All times are local

25 September 2010; 15:00	THW Kiel (Germany)	35 – 23	(France) Chambéry Savoie	Sparkassen-Arena, Kiel; Attendance: 10,250; Referees: Kohout, Novak (Czech Republic)
25 September 2010; 15:00	Jicha 7	(21–10)	Detrez 7	Sparkassen-Arena, Kiel; Attendance: 10,250; Referees: Kohout, Novak (Czech Republic)
25 September 2010; 15:00	3× (yellow card) 2× (suspension)	Report	3× (yellow card) 2× (suspension)	Sparkassen-Arena, Kiel; Attendance: 10,250; Referees: Kohout, Novak (Czech Republic)

25 September 2010; 16:20	F.C. Barcelona Borges (Spain)	30 – 31	(Germany) Rhein-Neckar Löwen	Palau Blaugrana, Barcelona; Attendance: 3,000; Referees: Olesen, Pedersen (Denmark)
25 September 2010; 16:20	Nagy 7	(13–14)	Čupić 10	Palau Blaugrana, Barcelona; Attendance: 3,000; Referees: Olesen, Pedersen (Denmark)
25 September 2010; 16:20	2× (yellow card) 3× (suspension)	Report	3× (yellow card) 6× (suspension)	Palau Blaugrana, Barcelona; Attendance: 3,000; Referees: Olesen, Pedersen (Denmark)

26 September 2010; 14:45	Vive Targi Kielce (Poland)	30 – 36	(Slovenia) Celje Laško	Hala Legionów, Kielce; Attendance: 4,000; Referees: Canbro, Claesson (Sweden)
26 September 2010; 14:45	Stojkovic 9	(11–18)	Rnić 11	Hala Legionów, Kielce; Attendance: 4,000; Referees: Canbro, Claesson (Sweden)
26 September 2010; 14:45	3× (yellow card) 3× (suspension)	Report	3× (yellow card) 6× (suspension)	Hala Legionów, Kielce; Attendance: 4,000; Referees: Canbro, Claesson (Sweden)

2 October 2010; 20:15	Celje Laško (Slovenia)	28 – 32	(Germany) Rhein-Neckar Löwen	Zlatorog Arena, Celje; Attendance: 5,200; Referees: Dinu, Din (Romania)
2 October 2010; 20:15	Gajic, Zorman 8	(12–14)	Gensheimer 12	Zlatorog Arena, Celje; Attendance: 5,200; Referees: Dinu, Din (Romania)
2 October 2010; 20:15	3× (yellow card) 6× (suspension)	Report	3× (yellow card) 6× (suspension)	Zlatorog Arena, Celje; Attendance: 5,200; Referees: Dinu, Din (Romania)

3 October 2010; 15:00	Chambéry Savoie (France)	27 – 26	(Poland) Vive Targi Kielce	Le Phare, Chambéry; Attendance: 3,000; Referees: Herczeg, Südi (Hungary)
3 October 2010; 15:00	Busselier 7	(16–12)	Rosinski, Stojkovic 5	Le Phare, Chambéry; Attendance: 3,000; Referees: Herczeg, Südi (Hungary)
3 October 2010; 15:00	3× (yellow card) 6× (suspension)	Report	2× (yellow card) 7× (suspension)	Le Phare, Chambéry; Attendance: 3,000; Referees: Herczeg, Südi (Hungary)

3 October 2010; 16:45	THW Kiel (Germany)	28 – 28	(Spain) F.C. Barcelona Borges	Sparkassen-Arena, Kiel; Attendance: 10,200; Referees: Nikolic, Stojkovic (Serbia)
3 October 2010; 16:45	Ahlm 6	(14–10)	Rocas, Sarmiento 6	Sparkassen-Arena, Kiel; Attendance: 10,200; Referees: Nikolic, Stojkovic (Serbia)
3 October 2010; 16:45	3× (yellow card) 2× (suspension)	Report	3× (yellow card) 2× (suspension) 1× (red card)	Sparkassen-Arena, Kiel; Attendance: 10,200; Referees: Nikolic, Stojkovic (Serbia)

9 October 2010; 16:15	F.C. Barcelona Borges (Spain)	44 – 33	(Slovenia) Celje Laško	Palau Blaugrana, Barcelona; Attendance: 3,500; Referees: Leifsson, Palsson (Iceland)
9 October 2010; 16:15	Rutenka 10	(22–15)	Gajic, Toskic 7	Palau Blaugrana, Barcelona; Attendance: 3,500; Referees: Leifsson, Palsson (Iceland)
9 October 2010; 16:15	2× (yellow card) 3× (suspension)	Report	3× (yellow card) 1× (suspension)	Palau Blaugrana, Barcelona; Attendance: 3,500; Referees: Leifsson, Palsson (Iceland)

10 October 2010; 17:15	THW Kiel (Germany)	33 – 29	(Poland) Vive Targi Kielce	Sparkassen-Arena, Kiel; Attendance: 10,250; Referees: Andersen, Sodal (Norway)
10 October 2010; 17:15	three players 6	(16–13)	Stojkovic 13	Sparkassen-Arena, Kiel; Attendance: 10,250; Referees: Andersen, Sodal (Norway)
10 October 2010; 17:15	2× (yellow card) 4× (suspension)	Report	2× (yellow card) 6× (suspension)	Sparkassen-Arena, Kiel; Attendance: 10,250; Referees: Andersen, Sodal (Norway)

10 October 2010; 18:45	Rhein-Neckar Löwen (Germany)	37 – 22	(France) Chambéry Savoie	SAP Arena, Mannheim; Attendance: 2,000; Referees: Johansson, Kliko (Sweden)
10 October 2010; 18:45	Gensheimer, Myrhol 6	(19–11)	Detrez, Paty 4	SAP Arena, Mannheim; Attendance: 2,000; Referees: Johansson, Kliko (Sweden)
10 October 2010; 18:45	3× (yellow card) 6× (suspension)	Report	3× (yellow card) 5× (suspension)	SAP Arena, Mannheim; Attendance: 2,000; Referees: Johansson, Kliko (Sweden)

17 October 2010; 15:00	Vive Targi Kielce (Poland)	23 – 23	(Germany) Rhein-Neckar Löwen	Hala Legionów, Kielce; Attendance: 4,000; Referees: Nikolov, Nachevski (Macedonia)
17 October 2010; 15:00	Stojkovic 5	(12–12)	Gensheimer 7	Hala Legionów, Kielce; Attendance: 4,000; Referees: Nikolov, Nachevski (Macedonia)
17 October 2010; 15:00	3× (yellow card) 3× (suspension) 1× (red card)	Report	3× (yellow card) 4× (suspension) 2× (red card)	Hala Legionów, Kielce; Attendance: 4,000; Referees: Nikolov, Nachevski (Macedonia)

17 October 2010; 15:45	Chambéry Savoie (France)	27 – 26	(Spain) F.C. Barcelona Borges	Le Phare, Chambéry; Attendance: 3,500; Referees: Zotin, Volodkov (Russia)
17 October 2010; 15:45	Basic 9	(14–12)	three players 4	Le Phare, Chambéry; Attendance: 3,500; Referees: Zotin, Volodkov (Russia)
17 October 2010; 15:45	3× (yellow card) 7× (suspension) 1× (red card)	Report	3× (yellow card) 2× (suspension)	Le Phare, Chambéry; Attendance: 3,500; Referees: Zotin, Volodkov (Russia)

17 October 2010; 18:30	Celje Laško (Slovenia)	28 – 34	(Germany) THW Kiel	Zlatorog Arena, Celje; Attendance: 3,900; Referees: Horacek, Novotny (Czech Republic)
17 October 2010; 18:30	Rnić 5	(10–18)	Palmarsson 7	Zlatorog Arena, Celje; Attendance: 3,900; Referees: Horacek, Novotny (Czech Republic)
17 October 2010; 18:30	3× (yellow card) 6× (suspension)	Report	2× (yellow card) 5× (suspension)	Zlatorog Arena, Celje; Attendance: 3,900; Referees: Horacek, Novotny (Czech Republic)

20 November 2010; 15:00	Vive Targi Kielce (Poland)	26 – 33	(Spain) F.C. Barcelona Borges	Hala Legionów, Kielce; Attendance: 4,000; Referees: Badura, Slovakia
20 November 2010; 15:00	Zaremba 6	(11–18)	Romero 11	Hala Legionów, Kielce; Attendance: 4,000; Referees: Badura, Slovakia
20 November 2010; 15:00	3× (yellow card) 2× (suspension)	Report	3× (yellow card) 1× (suspension)	Hala Legionów, Kielce; Attendance: 4,000; Referees: Badura, Slovakia

21 November 2010; 17:00	Chambéry Savoie (France)	30 – 24	(Slovenia) Celje Laško	Le Phare, Chambéry; Attendance: 4,000; Referees: Abrahamsen, Kristiansen (Norway)
21 November 2010; 17:00	Bašić 10	(13–11)	Poklar 5	Le Phare, Chambéry; Attendance: 4,000; Referees: Abrahamsen, Kristiansen (Norway)
21 November 2010; 17:00	3× (yellow card) 6× (suspension) 1× (red card)	Report	3× (yellow card) 7× (suspension) 1× (red card)	Le Phare, Chambéry; Attendance: 4,000; Referees: Abrahamsen, Kristiansen (Norway)

21 November 2010; 17:15	THW Kiel (Germany)	30 – 27	(Germany) Rhein-Neckar Löwen	Sparkassen-Arena, Kiel; Attendance: 10,250; Referees: Canbro, Claesson (Sweden)
21 November 2010; 17:15	Jicha 9	(17–9)	Gensheimer, Myrhol 7	Sparkassen-Arena, Kiel; Attendance: 10,250; Referees: Canbro, Claesson (Sweden)
21 November 2010; 17:15	3× (yellow card) 4× (suspension)	Report	3× (yellow card) 4× (suspension)	Sparkassen-Arena, Kiel; Attendance: 10,250; Referees: Canbro, Claesson (Sweden)

25 November 2010; 19:15	Rhein-Neckar Löwen (Germany)	30 – 30	(Germany) THW Kiel	SAP Arena, Mannheim; Attendance: 12,400; Referees: Olesen, Pedersen (Denmark)
25 November 2010; 19:15	Bielecki, Gensheimer 7	(17–14)	Jicha 9	SAP Arena, Mannheim; Attendance: 12,400; Referees: Olesen, Pedersen (Denmark)
25 November 2010; 19:15	3× (yellow card) 6× (suspension)	Report	3× (yellow card) 4× (suspension)	SAP Arena, Mannheim; Attendance: 12,400; Referees: Olesen, Pedersen (Denmark)

27 November 2010; 16:15	F.C. Barcelona Borges (Spain)	28 – 28	(Poland) Vive Targi Kielce	Palau Blaugrana, Barcelona; Attendance: 2,000; Referees: Stark, Stefan (Romania)
27 November 2010; 16:15	Romero 9	(15–12)	Zaremba 6	Palau Blaugrana, Barcelona; Attendance: 2,000; Referees: Stark, Stefan (Romania)
27 November 2010; 16:15	3× (yellow card) 2× (suspension)	Report	2× (yellow card) 2× (suspension)	Palau Blaugrana, Barcelona; Attendance: 2,000; Referees: Stark, Stefan (Romania)

27 November 2010; 19:15	Celje Laško (Slovenia)	35 – 27	(France) Chambéry Savoie	Zlatorog Arena, Celje; Attendance: 1,700; Referees: Dobrovits, Tajok (Hungary)
27 November 2010; 19:15	Vugrinec 9	(17–13)	Paty 5	Zlatorog Arena, Celje; Attendance: 1,700; Referees: Dobrovits, Tajok (Hungary)
27 November 2010; 19:15	2× (yellow card) 9× (suspension)	Report	3× (yellow card) 7× (suspension)	Zlatorog Arena, Celje; Attendance: 1,700; Referees: Dobrovits, Tajok (Hungary)

4 December 2010; 15:30	Rhein-Neckar Löwen (Germany)	33 – 32	(Slovenia) Celje Laško	SAP Arena, Mannheim; Attendance: 5,800; Referees: Mazeika, Gatelis (Lithuania)
4 December 2010; 15:30	three players 5	(14–16)	Gajic 7	SAP Arena, Mannheim; Attendance: 5,800; Referees: Mazeika, Gatelis (Lithuania)
4 December 2010; 15:30	3× (yellow card) 3× (suspension)	Report	2× (yellow card) 4× (suspension)	SAP Arena, Mannheim; Attendance: 5,800; Referees: Mazeika, Gatelis (Lithuania)

5 December 2010; 15:00	Vive Targi Kielce (Poland)	31 – 25	(France) Chambéry Savoie	Hala Legionów, Kielce; Attendance: 4,000; Referees: Pandzic, Mosorinski (Serbia)
5 December 2010; 15:00	three players 6	(16–15)	Basic 8	Hala Legionów, Kielce; Attendance: 4,000; Referees: Pandzic, Mosorinski (Serbia)
5 December 2010; 15:00	3× (yellow card) 2× (suspension)	Report	3× (yellow card) 4× (suspension)	Hala Legionów, Kielce; Attendance: 4,000; Referees: Pandzic, Mosorinski (Serbia)

5 December 2010; 17:15	F.C. Barcelona Borges (Spain)	32 – 29	(Germany) THW Kiel	Palau Blaugrana, Barcelona; Attendance: 6,500; Referees: Horacek, Novotny (Czech Republic)
5 December 2010; 17:15	Nagy 6	(13–15)	Reichmann, Zeitz 7	Palau Blaugrana, Barcelona; Attendance: 6,500; Referees: Horacek, Novotny (Czech Republic)
5 December 2010; 17:15	3× (yellow card) 1× (suspension)	Report	3× (yellow card) 4× (suspension)	Palau Blaugrana, Barcelona; Attendance: 6,500; Referees: Horacek, Novotny (Czech Republic)

19 February 2011; 18:00	Chambéry Savoie (France)	26 – 28	(Germany) THW Kiel	Le Phare, Chambéry; Attendance: 4,400; Referees: Pavicevic, Raznatovic (Montenegro)
19 February 2011; 18:00	Paty 7	(16–12)	Jícha 9	Le Phare, Chambéry; Attendance: 4,400; Referees: Pavicevic, Raznatovic (Montenegro)
19 February 2011; 18:00	3× (yellow card) 5× (suspension)	Report	3× (yellow card) 6× (suspension) 1× (red card)	Le Phare, Chambéry; Attendance: 4,400; Referees: Pavicevic, Raznatovic (Montenegro)

19 February 2011; 18:00	Celje Laško (Slovenia)	30 – 29	(Poland) Vive Targi Kielce	Zlatorog Arena, Celje; Attendance: 1,700; Referees: Stolarovs, Licis (Latvia)
19 February 2011; 18:00	Marguč 10	(12–14)	Rosiński 6	Zlatorog Arena, Celje; Attendance: 1,700; Referees: Stolarovs, Licis (Latvia)
19 February 2011; 18:00	3× (yellow card) 2× (suspension)	Report	2× (yellow card) 3× (suspension)	Zlatorog Arena, Celje; Attendance: 1,700; Referees: Stolarovs, Licis (Latvia)

20 February 2011; 15:30	Rhein-Neckar Löwen (Germany)	38 – 38	(Spain) F.C. Barcelona Borges	SAP Arena, Mannheim; Attendance: 13,200; Referees: Nybo, Poulsen (Denmark)
20 February 2011; 15:30	Gensheimer 15	(22–17)	Romero 10	SAP Arena, Mannheim; Attendance: 13,200; Referees: Nybo, Poulsen (Denmark)
20 February 2011; 15:30	3× (yellow card) 4× (suspension)	Report	3× (yellow card) 3× (suspension)	SAP Arena, Mannheim; Attendance: 13,200; Referees: Nybo, Poulsen (Denmark)

27 February 2011; 17:00	Rhein-Neckar Löwen (Germany)	29 – 27	(Poland) Vive Targi Kielce	SAP Arena, Mannheim; Attendance: 2,500; Referees: Dobrovits, Tajok (Hungary)
27 February 2011; 17:00	Gensheimer 7	(11–13)	Knudsen, Rosiński 6	SAP Arena, Mannheim; Attendance: 2,500; Referees: Dobrovits, Tajok (Hungary)
27 February 2011; 17:00	2× (yellow card) 4× (suspension)	Report	3× (yellow card) 7× (suspension)	SAP Arena, Mannheim; Attendance: 2,500; Referees: Dobrovits, Tajok (Hungary)

27 February 2011; 17:15	F.C. Barcelona Borges (Spain)	38 – 23	(France) Chambéry Savoie	Palau Blaugrana, Barcelona; Attendance: 7,200; Referees: Kekes, Kekes (Hungary)
27 February 2011; 17:15	Tomás 8	(20–7)	Saurina 8	Palau Blaugrana, Barcelona; Attendance: 7,200; Referees: Kekes, Kekes (Hungary)
27 February 2011; 17:15	3× (yellow card) 7× (suspension) 1× (red card)	Report	3× (yellow card) 6× (suspension)	Palau Blaugrana, Barcelona; Attendance: 7,200; Referees: Kekes, Kekes (Hungary)

27 February 2011; 18:45	THW Kiel (Germany)	43 – 27	(Slovenia) Celje Laško	Sparkassen-Arena, Kiel; Attendance: 10,250; Referees: Cacador, Nicolau (Portugal)
27 February 2011; 18:45	Fernandez 8	(23–16)	Marguč 8	Sparkassen-Arena, Kiel; Attendance: 10,250; Referees: Cacador, Nicolau (Portugal)
27 February 2011; 18:45	3× (yellow card) 1× (suspension)	Report	3× (yellow card) 3× (suspension)	Sparkassen-Arena, Kiel; Attendance: 10,250; Referees: Cacador, Nicolau (Portugal)

5 March 2011; 17:30	Chambéry Savoie (France)	32 – 27	(Germany) Rhein-Neckar Löwen	Le Phare, Chambéry; Attendance: 4,400; Referees: Gubica, Milosevic (Croatia)
5 March 2011; 17:30	Bašić, Bićanić 6	(17–16)	Stefánsson 8	Le Phare, Chambéry; Attendance: 4,400; Referees: Gubica, Milosevic (Croatia)
5 March 2011; 17:30	3× (yellow card) 3× (suspension)	Report	3× (yellow card) 4× (suspension) 1× (red card)	Le Phare, Chambéry; Attendance: 4,400; Referees: Gubica, Milosevic (Croatia)

5 March 2011; 18:00	Celje Laško (Slovenia)	27 – 30	(Spain) F.C. Barcelona Borges	Zlatorog Arena, Celje; Attendance: 3,800; Referees: Pedersen, Mortensen (Denmark)
5 March 2011; 18:00	Marguč 10	(15–16)	Rutenka 6	Zlatorog Arena, Celje; Attendance: 3,800; Referees: Pedersen, Mortensen (Denmark)
5 March 2011; 18:00	3× (yellow card) 4× (suspension)	Report	3× (yellow card) 3× (suspension)	Zlatorog Arena, Celje; Attendance: 3,800; Referees: Pedersen, Mortensen (Denmark)

6 March 2011; 18:30	Vive Targi Kielce (Poland)	27 – 36	(Germany) THW Kiel	Hala Legionów, Kielce; Attendance: 4,000; Referees: Kohout, Novak (Czech Republic)
6 March 2011; 18:30		(11–18)		Hala Legionów, Kielce; Attendance: 4,000; Referees: Kohout, Novak (Czech Republic)
6 March 2011; 18:30		Report		Hala Legionów, Kielce; Attendance: 4,000; Referees: Kohout, Novak (Czech Republic)

==== Group B ====
Team	Pld	W	D	L	GF	GA	GD	Pts
(France) Montpellier HB	10	8	0	2	326	259	+67	16
(Hungary) MKB Veszprém	10	8	0	2	322	284	+38	16
(Germany) HSV Hamburg	10	6	1	3	304	273	+31	13
(Denmark) KIF Kolding	10	5	0	5	296	316	−20	10
(Sweden) IK Sävehof	10	1	1	8	283	347	−64	3
(Slovakia) HT Tatran Prešov	10	0	2	8	273	325	−52	2

All times are local

26 September 2010; 16:15	IK Sävehof (Sweden)	30 – 38	(Denmark) KIF Kolding	Scandinavium, Gothenburg; Attendance: 2,200; Referees: Lopez, Ramirez (Spain)
26 September 2010; 16:15	Stenbäcken 11	(15–15)	Christiansen 10	Scandinavium, Gothenburg; Attendance: 2,200; Referees: Lopez, Ramirez (Spain)
26 September 2010; 16:15	3× (yellow card) 1× (suspension)	Report	3× (yellow card) 7× (suspension)	Scandinavium, Gothenburg; Attendance: 2,200; Referees: Lopez, Ramirez (Spain)

26 September 2010; 17:00	Montpellier HB (France)	26 – 30	(Germany) HSV Hamburg	Arena Montpellier, Montpellier; Attendance: 9,000; Referees: Stolarovs, Licis (Latvia)
26 September 2010; 17:00	Karabatić 6	(15–12)	Duvnjak 6	Arena Montpellier, Montpellier; Attendance: 9,000; Referees: Stolarovs, Licis (Latvia)
26 September 2010; 17:00	2× (yellow card) 8× (suspension) 1× (red card)	Report	1× (yellow card) 7× (suspension) 1× (red card)	Arena Montpellier, Montpellier; Attendance: 9,000; Referees: Stolarovs, Licis (Latvia)

26 September 2010; 17:30	HT Tatran Prešov (Slovakia)	27 – 35	(Hungary) MKB Veszprém	Mestská hala Prešov, Prešov; Attendance: 3,000; Referees: Pandzic, Mosorinski (Serbia)
26 September 2010; 17:30	Antl 7	(15–19)	Vujin 9	Mestská hala Prešov, Prešov; Attendance: 3,000; Referees: Pandzic, Mosorinski (Serbia)
26 September 2010; 17:30	3× (yellow card) 1× (suspension)	Report	3× (yellow card) 7× (suspension) 1× (red card)	Mestská hala Prešov, Prešov; Attendance: 3,000; Referees: Pandzic, Mosorinski (Serbia)

2 October 2010; 17:25	MKB Veszprém (Hungary)	33 – 30	(Germany) HSV Hamburg	Veszprém Aréna, Veszprém; Attendance: 5,000; Referees: Abrahamsen, Kristiansen (Norway)
2 October 2010; 17:25	Vujin 13	(15–13)	Jansen, Lindberg 6	Veszprém Aréna, Veszprém; Attendance: 5,000; Referees: Abrahamsen, Kristiansen (Norway)
2 October 2010; 17:25	3× (yellow card) 5× (suspension)	Report	3× (yellow card) 5× (suspension)	Veszprém Aréna, Veszprém; Attendance: 5,000; Referees: Abrahamsen, Kristiansen (Norway)

2 October 2010; 20:30	Montpellier HB (France)	33 – 21	(Sweden) IK Sävehof	Arena Montpellier, Montpellier; Attendance: 8,000; Referees: Gousko, Repkin (Belarus)
2 October 2010; 20:30	Juricek 8	(16–9)	Barud, Fritzon 5	Arena Montpellier, Montpellier; Attendance: 8,000; Referees: Gousko, Repkin (Belarus)
2 October 2010; 20:30	3× (yellow card) 2× (suspension)	Report	3× (yellow card) 5× (suspension)	Arena Montpellier, Montpellier; Attendance: 8,000; Referees: Gousko, Repkin (Belarus)

3 October 2010; 17:15	HT Tatran Prešov (Slovakia)	29 – 31	(Denmark) KIF Kolding	Mestská hala Prešov, Prešov; Attendance: 3,000; Referees: Jurinovic, Mrvica (Croatia)
3 October 2010; 17:15	Sobol, Tumidalsky 6	(13–17)	Christiansen 6	Mestská hala Prešov, Prešov; Attendance: 3,000; Referees: Jurinovic, Mrvica (Croatia)
3 October 2010; 17:15	2× (yellow card)	Report	3× (yellow card) 1× (suspension)	Mestská hala Prešov, Prešov; Attendance: 3,000; Referees: Jurinovic, Mrvica (Croatia)

9 October 2010; 16:15	KIF Kolding (Denmark)	32 – 30	(Germany) HSV Hamburg	Kolding Hallen, Kolding; Attendance: 2,700; Referees: Horacek, Novotny (Czech Republic)
9 October 2010; 16:15	Christiansen, Nikolic 6	(16–15)	Lacković 7	Kolding Hallen, Kolding; Attendance: 2,700; Referees: Horacek, Novotny (Czech Republic)
9 October 2010; 16:15	3× (yellow card) 4× (suspension)	Report	3× (yellow card) 1× (suspension)	Kolding Hallen, Kolding; Attendance: 2,700; Referees: Horacek, Novotny (Czech Republic)

9 October 2010; 17:25	MKB Veszprém (Hungary)	27 – 26	(France) Montpellier HB	Veszprém Aréna, Veszprém; Attendance: 5,000; Referees: Kohout, Novak (Czech Republic)
9 October 2010; 17:25	Vujin 7	(13–15)	Accambray 9	Veszprém Aréna, Veszprém; Attendance: 5,000; Referees: Kohout, Novak (Czech Republic)
9 October 2010; 17:25	3× (yellow card) 3× (suspension)	Report	2× (yellow card) 4× (suspension)	Veszprém Aréna, Veszprém; Attendance: 5,000; Referees: Kohout, Novak (Czech Republic)

10 October 2010; 16:15	IK Sävehof (Sweden)	33 – 32	(Slovakia) HT Tatran Prešov	Partillebohallen, Gothenburg; Attendance: 2,400; Referees: Kouz, Zhoba (Ukraine)
10 October 2010; 16:15	Fridén 7	(16–11)	Antl, Radcenko 6	Partillebohallen, Gothenburg; Attendance: 2,400; Referees: Kouz, Zhoba (Ukraine)
10 October 2010; 16:15	3× (yellow card) 8× (suspension) 2× (red card)	Report	2× (yellow card) 9× (suspension) 2× (red card)	Partillebohallen, Gothenburg; Attendance: 2,400; Referees: Kouz, Zhoba (Ukraine)

14 October 2010; 20:00	HSV Hamburg (Germany)	33 – 24	(Sweden) IK Sävehof	O2 World Hamburg, Hamburg; Attendance: 2,500; Referees: Stark, Stefan (Romania)
14 October 2010; 20:00	Lacković 6	(16–14)	Jakobsson, Stenbäcken 5	O2 World Hamburg, Hamburg; Attendance: 2,500; Referees: Stark, Stefan (Romania)
14 October 2010; 20:00	2× (yellow card) 4× (suspension) 1× (red card)	Report	2× (yellow card) 2× (suspension)	O2 World Hamburg, Hamburg; Attendance: 2,500; Referees: Stark, Stefan (Romania)

16 October 2010; 16:15	MKB Veszprém (Hungary)	31 – 28	(Denmark) KIF Kolding	Veszprém Aréna, Veszprém; Attendance: 5,019; Referees: Jose, Murcia (Spain)
16 October 2010; 16:15	Perez, Vujin 7	(13–16)	Christiansen 9	Veszprém Aréna, Veszprém; Attendance: 5,019; Referees: Jose, Murcia (Spain)
16 October 2010; 16:15	3× (yellow card) 6× (suspension)	Report	3× (yellow card) 6× (suspension)	Veszprém Aréna, Veszprém; Attendance: 5,019; Referees: Jose, Murcia (Spain)

16 October 2010; 18:00	HT Tatran Prešov (Slovakia)	31 – 33	(France) Montpellier HB	Mestská hala Prešov, Prešov; Attendance: 3,000; Referees: Vodopivec, Krasna (Slovenia)
16 October 2010; 18:00	Sobol 12	(16–17)	Accambray 14	Mestská hala Prešov, Prešov; Attendance: 3,000; Referees: Vodopivec, Krasna (Slovenia)
16 October 2010; 18:00	3× (yellow card) 3× (suspension)	Report	3× (yellow card) 5× (suspension)	Mestská hala Prešov, Prešov; Attendance: 3,000; Referees: Vodopivec, Krasna (Slovenia)

20 November 2010; 15:00	HSV Hamburg (Germany)	35 – 23	(Slovakia) HT Tatran Prešov	O2 World Hamburg, Hamburg; Attendance: 3,100; Referees: Eliasson, Gudjonsson (Iceland)
20 November 2010; 15:00	Hens 6	(17–11)	Kristopans 7	O2 World Hamburg, Hamburg; Attendance: 3,100; Referees: Eliasson, Gudjonsson (Iceland)
20 November 2010; 15:00	3× (yellow card) 6× (suspension)	Report	3× (yellow card) 7× (suspension)	O2 World Hamburg, Hamburg; Attendance: 3,100; Referees: Eliasson, Gudjonsson (Iceland)

20 November 2010; 16:15	KIF Kolding (Denmark)	28 – 36	(France) Montpellier HB	Kolding Hallen, Kolding; Attendance: 2,800; Referees: Krstic, Ljubic (Slovenia)
20 November 2010; 16:15	Christiansen, Oechsler 7	(13–19)	Kavticnik 8	Kolding Hallen, Kolding; Attendance: 2,800; Referees: Krstic, Ljubic (Slovenia)
20 November 2010; 16:15	3× (yellow card) 2× (suspension)	Report	3× (yellow card) 3× (suspension)	Kolding Hallen, Kolding; Attendance: 2,800; Referees: Krstic, Ljubic (Slovenia)

21 November 2010; 15:15	IK Sävehof (Sweden)	31 – 41	(Hungary) MKB Veszprém	Partillebohallen, Gothenburg; Attendance: 2,100; Referees: Nikolov, Nachevski (Macedonia)
21 November 2010; 15:15	Fritzon 7	(15–22)	Vujin 11	Partillebohallen, Gothenburg; Attendance: 2,100; Referees: Nikolov, Nachevski (Macedonia)
21 November 2010; 15:15	3× (yellow card) 4× (suspension)	Report	3× (yellow card) 7× (suspension)	Partillebohallen, Gothenburg; Attendance: 2,100; Referees: Nikolov, Nachevski (Macedonia)

27 November 2010; 17:25	MKB Veszprém (Hungary)	38 – 34	(Sweden) IK Sävehof	Veszprém Aréna, Veszprém; Attendance: 5,000; Referees: Zotin, Volodkov (Russia)
27 November 2010; 17:25	Vujin 11	(17–15)	Stenbäcken 9	Veszprém Aréna, Veszprém; Attendance: 5,000; Referees: Zotin, Volodkov (Russia)
27 November 2010; 17:25	3× (yellow card) 6× (suspension)	Report	3× (yellow card) 1× (suspension)	Veszprém Aréna, Veszprém; Attendance: 5,000; Referees: Zotin, Volodkov (Russia)

28 November 2010; 16:00	HT Tatran Prešov (Slovakia)	26 – 26	(Germany) HSV Hamburg	Mestská hala Prešov, Prešov; Attendance: 3,800; Referees: Nikolovski, Kolevski (Macedonia)
28 November 2010; 16:00	Antl 8	(13–15)	Kraus 6	Mestská hala Prešov, Prešov; Attendance: 3,800; Referees: Nikolovski, Kolevski (Macedonia)
28 November 2010; 16:00	3× (yellow card) 2× (suspension)	Report	2× (yellow card) 4× (suspension)	Mestská hala Prešov, Prešov; Attendance: 3,800; Referees: Nikolovski, Kolevski (Macedonia)

28 November 2010; 17:00	Montpellier HB (France)	40 – 25	(Denmark) KIF Kolding	Arena Montpellier, Montpellier; Attendance: 9,000; Referees: Nikolic, Stojkovic (Serbia)
28 November 2010; 17:00	Karabatić 8	(19–10)	Jensen, Toromanovic 5	Arena Montpellier, Montpellier; Attendance: 9,000; Referees: Nikolic, Stojkovic (Serbia)
28 November 2010; 17:00	3× (yellow card) 3× (suspension)	Report	3× (yellow card) 6× (suspension) 1× (red card)	Arena Montpellier, Montpellier; Attendance: 9,000; Referees: Nikolic, Stojkovic (Serbia)

4 December 2010; 16:15	KIF Kolding (Denmark)	28 – 27	(Slovakia) HT Tatran Prešov	Kolding Hallen, Kolding; Attendance: 2,100; Referees: Liachovicius, Gecevicius (Lithuania)
4 December 2010; 16:15	Karlsson 6	(14–16)	Kristopans, Sobol 7	Kolding Hallen, Kolding; Attendance: 2,100; Referees: Liachovicius, Gecevicius (Lithuania)
4 December 2010; 16:15	3× (yellow card) 3× (suspension) 1× (red card)	Report	3× (yellow card) 3× (suspension)	Kolding Hallen, Kolding; Attendance: 2,100; Referees: Liachovicius, Gecevicius (Lithuania)

4 December 2010; 17:00	HSV Hamburg (Germany)	27 – 26	(Hungary) MKB Veszprém	O2 World Hamburg, Hamburg; Attendance: 3,700; Referees: Lopez, Ramirez (Spain)
4 December 2010; 17:00	Hens 8	(13–11)	Vujin 7	O2 World Hamburg, Hamburg; Attendance: 3,700; Referees: Lopez, Ramirez (Spain)
4 December 2010; 17:00	3× (yellow card) 3× (suspension)	Report	3× (yellow card) 4× (suspension)	O2 World Hamburg, Hamburg; Attendance: 3,700; Referees: Lopez, Ramirez (Spain)

6 December 2010; 20:10	IK Sävehof (Sweden)	21 – 34	(France) Montpellier HB	Partillebohallen, Gothenburg; Attendance: 1,900; Referees: Lorente, Serradilla (Spain)
6 December 2010; 20:10	three players 4	(10–16)	Accambray, Bojinovic 6	Partillebohallen, Gothenburg; Attendance: 1,900; Referees: Lorente, Serradilla (Spain)
6 December 2010; 20:10	3× (yellow card) 3× (suspension)	Report	3× (yellow card) 2× (suspension)	Partillebohallen, Gothenburg; Attendance: 1,900; Referees: Lorente, Serradilla (Spain)

19 February 2011; 16:15	KIF Kolding (Denmark)	33 – 27	(Sweden) IK Sävehof	Kolding Hallen, Kolding; Attendance: 2,200; Referees: Togstad, Kristiansen (Norway)
19 February 2011; 16:15	Christiansen 9	(21–11)	Fritzon 6	Kolding Hallen, Kolding; Attendance: 2,200; Referees: Togstad, Kristiansen (Norway)
19 February 2011; 16:15	3× (yellow card) 3× (suspension)	Report	2× (yellow card)	Kolding Hallen, Kolding; Attendance: 2,200; Referees: Togstad, Kristiansen (Norway)

19 February 2011; 19:15	MKB Veszprém (Hungary)	33 – 22	(Slovakia) HT Tatran Prešov	Veszprém Aréna, Veszprém; Attendance: 5,000; Referees: Andersen, Sodal (Norway)
19 February 2011; 19:15	Vujin 6	(21–10)	Antl 7	Veszprém Aréna, Veszprém; Attendance: 5,000; Referees: Andersen, Sodal (Norway)
19 February 2011; 19:15	3× (yellow card) 5× (suspension)	Report	3× (yellow card) 4× (suspension)	Veszprém Aréna, Veszprém; Attendance: 5,000; Referees: Andersen, Sodal (Norway)

20 February 2011; 17:00	HSV Hamburg (Germany)	27 – 28	(France) Montpellier HB	O2 World Hamburg, Hamburg; Attendance: 4,100; Referees: Nikolov, Nachevski (Macedonia)
20 February 2011; 17:00	Lijewski 6	(11–13)	Bojinovic 10	O2 World Hamburg, Hamburg; Attendance: 4,100; Referees: Nikolov, Nachevski (Macedonia)
20 February 2011; 17:00	3× (yellow card) 1× (suspension)	Report	3× (yellow card) 4× (suspension)	O2 World Hamburg, Hamburg; Attendance: 4,100; Referees: Nikolov, Nachevski (Macedonia)

26 February 2011; 16:15	KIF Kolding (Denmark)	29 – 34	(Hungary) MKB Veszprém	Kolding Hallen, Kolding; Attendance: 3,000; Referees: Din, Dinu (Romania)
26 February 2011; 16:15	Christiansen, Spellerberg 6	(11–16)	Császár 6	Kolding Hallen, Kolding; Attendance: 3,000; Referees: Din, Dinu (Romania)
26 February 2011; 16:15	3× (suspension)	Report	7× (suspension)	Kolding Hallen, Kolding; Attendance: 3,000; Referees: Din, Dinu (Romania)

26 February 2011; 16:20	IK Sävehof (Sweden)	31 – 34	(Germany) HSV Hamburg	Partillebohallen, Gothenburg; Attendance: 2,000; Referees: Hajek, Macho (Czech Republic)
26 February 2011; 16:20		(18–18)		Partillebohallen, Gothenburg; Attendance: 2,000; Referees: Hajek, Macho (Czech Republic)
26 February 2011; 16:20		Report		Partillebohallen, Gothenburg; Attendance: 2,000; Referees: Hajek, Macho (Czech Republic)

27 February 2011; 17:00	Montpellier HB (France)	40 – 25	(Slovakia) HT Tatran Prešov	Arena Montpellier, Montpellier; Attendance: 8,500; Referees: Liudovyk, Chernega
27 February 2011; 17:00	Karabatić 7	(19–11)	Antl 7	Arena Montpellier, Montpellier; Attendance: 8,500; Referees: Liudovyk, Chernega
27 February 2011; 17:00	2× (yellow card) 5× (suspension)	Report	3× (yellow card) 5× (suspension)	Arena Montpellier, Montpellier; Attendance: 8,500; Referees: Liudovyk, Chernega

6 March 2011; 16:00	HT Tatran Prešov (Slovakia)	31 – 31	(Sweden) IK Sävehof	Mestská hala Prešov, Prešov; Attendance: 3,100; Referees: Kaveshnikov, Plotnikov (Russia)
6 March 2011; 16:00	Antl 12	(15–15)	Johansson 9	Mestská hala Prešov, Prešov; Attendance: 3,100; Referees: Kaveshnikov, Plotnikov (Russia)
6 March 2011; 16:00	2× (yellow card) 2× (suspension)	Report	2× (yellow card) 2× (suspension)	Mestská hala Prešov, Prešov; Attendance: 3,100; Referees: Kaveshnikov, Plotnikov (Russia)

6 March 2011; 17:00	HSV Hamburg (Germany)	32 – 24	(Denmark) KIF Kolding	O2 World Hamburg, Hamburg; Attendance: 4,100; Referees: Krstic, Ljubic (Slovenia)
6 March 2011; 17:00	Kraus 6	(18–12)	Spellerberg 6	O2 World Hamburg, Hamburg; Attendance: 4,100; Referees: Krstic, Ljubic (Slovenia)
6 March 2011; 17:00	3× (yellow card) 1× (suspension)	Report	3× (yellow card) 3× (suspension)	O2 World Hamburg, Hamburg; Attendance: 4,100; Referees: Krstic, Ljubic (Slovenia)

6 March 2011; 17:30	Montpellier HB (France)	30 – 24	(Hungary) MKB Veszprém	Arena Montpellier, Montpellier; Attendance: 9,000; Referees: Brunovsky, Canda (Slovakia)
6 March 2011; 17:30	Honrubia 7	(13–11)	Sulić 8	Arena Montpellier, Montpellier; Attendance: 9,000; Referees: Brunovsky, Canda (Slovakia)
6 March 2011; 17:30	3× (yellow card) 3× (suspension)	Report	3× (yellow card) 4× (suspension)	Arena Montpellier, Montpellier; Attendance: 9,000; Referees: Brunovsky, Canda (Slovakia)

==== Group C ====
Team	Pld	W	D	L	GF	GA	GD	Pts
(Russia) Chekhovskiye Medvedi	10	6	2	2	315	282	+33	14
(Spain) BM Valladolid	10	5	3	2	300	284	+16	13
(Hungary) Pick Szeged	10	5	0	5	290	291	−1	10
(Switzerland) Kadetten Schaffhausen	10	4	1	5	304	315	−11	9
(Belarus) HC Dinamo-Minsk	10	3	2	5	307	316	−9	8
(Denmark) AaB Handball	10	2	2	6	311	339	−28	6

All times are local

23 September 2010; 19:00	Chekhovskiye Medvedi (Russia)	39 – 29	(Denmark) AaB Handball	Sporthall Olimpijski, Chekhov; Attendance: 2,800; Referees: Nikolov, Nachevski (Macedonia)
23 September 2010; 19:00	Filippov 7	(20–14)	Lennartsson 7	Sporthall Olimpijski, Chekhov; Attendance: 2,800; Referees: Nikolov, Nachevski (Macedonia)
23 September 2010; 19:00	3× (yellow card) 2× (suspension)	Report	3× (yellow card) 1× (suspension)	Sporthall Olimpijski, Chekhov; Attendance: 2,800; Referees: Nikolov, Nachevski (Macedonia)

25 September 2010; 17:25	Pick Szeged (Hungary)	29 – 26	(Switzerland) Kadetten Schaffhausen	Városi Sportcsarnok, Szeged; Attendance: 2,000; Referees: Vodopivec, Krasna (Slovenia)
25 September 2010; 17:25	Beocanin, Törő 6	(12–10)	Patrail 7	Városi Sportcsarnok, Szeged; Attendance: 2,000; Referees: Vodopivec, Krasna (Slovenia)
25 September 2010; 17:25	3× (yellow card) 5× (suspension)	Report	3× (yellow card) 7× (suspension) 1× (red card)	Városi Sportcsarnok, Szeged; Attendance: 2,000; Referees: Vodopivec, Krasna (Slovenia)

26 September 2010; 17:00	HC Dinamo-Minsk (Belarus)	30 – 35	(Spain) BM Valladolid	Minsk Sports Palace, Minsk; Attendance: 2,200; Referees: Methe, Methe (Germany)
26 September 2010; 17:00	Atman, Kazhaneuski 6	(12–18)	Joli 7	Minsk Sports Palace, Minsk; Attendance: 2,200; Referees: Methe, Methe (Germany)
26 September 2010; 17:00	3× (yellow card) 6× (suspension) 1× (red card)	Report	3× (yellow card) 3× (suspension)	Minsk Sports Palace, Minsk; Attendance: 2,200; Referees: Methe, Methe (Germany)

2 October 2010; 16:30	HC Dinamo-Minsk (Belarus)	33 – 29	(Hungary) Pick Szeged	Minsk Sports Palace, Minsk; Attendance: 2,100; Referees: Opava, Valek (Czech Republic)
2 October 2010; 16:30	Onufryienko, Pukhouski 9	(13–16)	Šulc 6	Minsk Sports Palace, Minsk; Attendance: 2,100; Referees: Opava, Valek (Czech Republic)
2 October 2010; 16:30	3× (yellow card) 2× (suspension)	Report	3× (yellow card) 3× (suspension) 1× (red card)	Minsk Sports Palace, Minsk; Attendance: 2,100; Referees: Opava, Valek (Czech Republic)

2 October 2010; 18:00	BM Valladolid (Spain)	26 – 26	(Russia) Chekhovskiye Medvedi	Polideportivo Pisuerga, Valladolid; Attendance: 3,500; Referees: Buy, Pichon (France)
2 October 2010; 18:00	Gurbindo 6	(15–13)	Harbok 5	Polideportivo Pisuerga, Valladolid; Attendance: 3,500; Referees: Buy, Pichon (France)
2 October 2010; 18:00	3× (yellow card) 3× (suspension)	Report	3× (yellow card) 7× (suspension) 1× (red card)	Polideportivo Pisuerga, Valladolid; Attendance: 3,500; Referees: Buy, Pichon (France)

3 October 2010; 15:50	AaB Handball (Denmark)	30 – 30	(Switzerland) Kadetten Schaffhausen	Gigantium, Aalborg; Attendance: 1,600; Referees: Geipel, Helbig (Germany)
3 October 2010; 15:50	Kjelling 7	(15–14)	Patrail 9	Gigantium, Aalborg; Attendance: 1,600; Referees: Geipel, Helbig (Germany)
3 October 2010; 15:50	3× (yellow card) 4× (suspension)	Report	3× (yellow card) 4× (suspension)	Gigantium, Aalborg; Attendance: 1,600; Referees: Geipel, Helbig (Germany)

6 October 2010; 19:30	Kadetten Schaffhausen (Switzerland)	28 – 30	(Spain) BM Valladolid	Schweizersbildhalle, Schaffhausen; Attendance: 1,700; Referees: Badura, Ondogrucela (Slovakia)
6 October 2010; 19:30	Patrail, Ursic 6	(15–15)	Fernandez Roura, Tvedten 6	Schweizersbildhalle, Schaffhausen; Attendance: 1,700; Referees: Badura, Ondogrucela (Slovakia)
6 October 2010; 19:30	3× (yellow card) 4× (suspension)	Report	3× (yellow card) 2× (suspension)	Schweizersbildhalle, Schaffhausen; Attendance: 1,700; Referees: Badura, Ondogrucela (Slovakia)

7 October 2010; 19:30	HC Dinamo-Minsk (Belarus)	27 – 34	(Russia) Chekhovskiye Medvedi	Minsk Sports Palace, Minsk; Attendance: 2,300; Referees: Brunovský, Canda (Slovakia)
7 October 2010; 19:30	Pukhouski 7	(18–18)	Dibirov 8	Minsk Sports Palace, Minsk; Attendance: 2,300; Referees: Brunovský, Canda (Slovakia)
7 October 2010; 19:30	3× (yellow card) 4× (suspension)	Report	3× (yellow card) 7× (suspension)	Minsk Sports Palace, Minsk; Attendance: 2,300; Referees: Brunovský, Canda (Slovakia)

10 October 2010; 17:25	Pick Szeged (Hungary)	37 – 28	(Denmark) AaB Handball	Városi Sportcsarnok, Szeged; Attendance: 2,500; Referees: Fleisch, Rieber (Germany)
10 October 2010; 17:25	Katzirz, Šulc 7	(18–13)	Larholm 9	Városi Sportcsarnok, Szeged; Attendance: 2,500; Referees: Fleisch, Rieber (Germany)
10 October 2010; 17:25	3× (yellow card) 3× (suspension)	Report	3× (yellow card) 4× (suspension)	Városi Sportcsarnok, Szeged; Attendance: 2,500; Referees: Fleisch, Rieber (Germany)

14 October 2010; 19:00	Chekhovskiye Medvedi (Russia)	38 – 35	(Switzerland) Kadetten Schaffhausen	Sporthall Olimpijski, Chekhov; Attendance: 2,700; Referees: Dinu, Din (Romania)
14 October 2010; 19:00	Filippov 9	(21–15)	Jurca, Patrail 6	Sporthall Olimpijski, Chekhov; Attendance: 2,700; Referees: Dinu, Din (Romania)
14 October 2010; 19:00	3× (yellow card) 2× (suspension)	Report	3× (yellow card) 6× (suspension)	Sporthall Olimpijski, Chekhov; Attendance: 2,700; Referees: Dinu, Din (Romania)

16 October 2010; 18:00	BM Valladolid (Spain)	26 – 23	(Hungary) Pick Szeged	Polideportivo Pisuerga, Valladolid; Attendance: 4,000; Referees: Mazeika, Gatelis (Lithuania)
16 October 2010; 18:00	Gurbindo 7	(13–11)	Šulc 7	Polideportivo Pisuerga, Valladolid; Attendance: 4,000; Referees: Mazeika, Gatelis (Lithuania)
16 October 2010; 18:00	3× (yellow card) 5× (suspension) 1× (red card)	Report	3× (yellow card) 3× (suspension)	Polideportivo Pisuerga, Valladolid; Attendance: 4,000; Referees: Mazeika, Gatelis (Lithuania)

17 October 2010; 15:50	AaB Handball (Denmark)	33 – 29	(Belarus) HC Dinamo-Minsk	Gigantium, Aalborg; Attendance: 2,400; Referees: Pandzic, Mosorinski (Serbia)
17 October 2010; 15:50	Kjelling 10	(11–16)	three players 5	Gigantium, Aalborg; Attendance: 2,400; Referees: Pandzic, Mosorinski (Serbia)
17 October 2010; 15:50	3× (yellow card) 3× (suspension)	Report	3× (yellow card) 4× (suspension)	Gigantium, Aalborg; Attendance: 2,400; Referees: Pandzic, Mosorinski (Serbia)

18 November 2010; 19:00	Chekhovskiye Medvedi (Russia)	25 – 26	(Hungary) Pick Szeged	Sporthall Olimpijski, Chekhov; Attendance: 2,000; Referees: Jurinovic, Mrvica (Croatia)
18 November 2010; 19:00	Harbok, Shelmenko 6	(12–10)	Katzirz, Lékai 7	Sporthall Olimpijski, Chekhov; Attendance: 2,000; Referees: Jurinovic, Mrvica (Croatia)
18 November 2010; 19:00	3× (yellow card) 2× (suspension)	Report	1× (yellow card) 1× (suspension)	Sporthall Olimpijski, Chekhov; Attendance: 2,000; Referees: Jurinovic, Mrvica (Croatia)

21 November 2010; 15:50	AaB Handball (Denmark)	32 – 36	(Spain) BM Valladolid	Gigantium, Aalborg; Attendance: 2,500; Referees: Dentz, Reibel (France)
21 November 2010; 15:50	Kjelling 8	(14–17)	Joli, Perales Perez 6	Gigantium, Aalborg; Attendance: 2,500; Referees: Dentz, Reibel (France)
21 November 2010; 15:50	3× (yellow card) 3× (suspension)	Report	3× (yellow card) 4× (suspension)	Gigantium, Aalborg; Attendance: 2,500; Referees: Dentz, Reibel (France)

27 November 2010; 18:00	BM Valladolid (Spain)	33 – 33	(Denmark) AaB Handball	Polideportivo Pisuerga, Valladolid; Attendance: 4,000; Referees: Leifsson, Palsson (Iceland)
27 November 2010; 18:00	Bilbija 8	(14–16)	Larholm 8	Polideportivo Pisuerga, Valladolid; Attendance: 4,000; Referees: Leifsson, Palsson (Iceland)
27 November 2010; 18:00	3× (yellow card) 3× (suspension)	Report	3× (yellow card) 4× (suspension)	Polideportivo Pisuerga, Valladolid; Attendance: 4,000; Referees: Leifsson, Palsson (Iceland)

28 November 2010; 16:00	HC Dinamo-Minsk (Belarus)	31 – 32	(Switzerland) Kadetten Schaffhausen	Minsk Sports Palace, Minsk; Attendance: 2,700; Referees: Andersen, Sodal (Norway)
28 November 2010; 16:00	Atman 7	(14–16)	Filip 11	Minsk Sports Palace, Minsk; Attendance: 2,700; Referees: Andersen, Sodal (Norway)
28 November 2010; 16:00	3× (yellow card) 3× (suspension)	Report	3× (yellow card) 4× (suspension)	Minsk Sports Palace, Minsk; Attendance: 2,700; Referees: Andersen, Sodal (Norway)

28 November 2010; 17:25	Pick Szeged (Hungary)	22 – 29	(Russia) Chekhovskiye Medvedi	Városi Sportcsarnok, Szeged; Attendance: 4,000; Referees: Lazaar, Reveret (France)
28 November 2010; 17:25	Lekai 6	(8–16)	Filippov 5	Városi Sportcsarnok, Szeged; Attendance: 4,000; Referees: Lazaar, Reveret (France)
28 November 2010; 17:25	3× (yellow card) 7× (suspension)	Report	3× (yellow card) 6× (suspension) 2× (red card)	Városi Sportcsarnok, Szeged; Attendance: 4,000; Referees: Lazaar, Reveret (France)

2 December 2010; 19:00	Chekhovskiye Medvedi (Russia)	29 – 27	(Spain) BM Valladolid	Sporthall Olimpijski, Chekhov; Attendance: 2,700; Referees: Johansson, Kliko (Sweden)
2 December 2010; 19:00	Harbok 12	(15–11)	Perales Perez 7	Sporthall Olimpijski, Chekhov; Attendance: 2,700; Referees: Johansson, Kliko (Sweden)
2 December 2010; 19:00	2× (yellow card) 3× (suspension)	Report	3× (yellow card) 2× (suspension)	Sporthall Olimpijski, Chekhov; Attendance: 2,700; Referees: Johansson, Kliko (Sweden)

4 December 2010; 15:10	Pick Szeged (Hungary)	37 – 34	(Belarus) HC Dinamo-Minsk	Városi Sportcsarnok, Szeged; Attendance: 2,800; Referees: Dinu, Din (Romania)
4 December 2010; 15:10	Šulc 16	(20–18)	Pukhouski 9	Városi Sportcsarnok, Szeged; Attendance: 2,800; Referees: Dinu, Din (Romania)
4 December 2010; 15:10	3× (yellow card) 5× (suspension)	Report	3× (yellow card) 8× (suspension)	Városi Sportcsarnok, Szeged; Attendance: 2,800; Referees: Dinu, Din (Romania)

5 December 2010; 17:30	Kadetten Schaffhausen (Switzerland)	34 – 31	(Denmark) AaB Handball	Schweizersbildhalle, Schaffhausen; Attendance: 1,200; Referees: Kohout, Novak (Czech Republic)
5 December 2010; 17:30	Jurca, Patrail 9	(17–19)	Larholm 8	Schweizersbildhalle, Schaffhausen; Attendance: 1,200; Referees: Kohout, Novak (Czech Republic)
5 December 2010; 17:30	3× (yellow card) 4× (suspension)	Report	3× (yellow card) 5× (suspension)	Schweizersbildhalle, Schaffhausen; Attendance: 1,200; Referees: Kohout, Novak (Czech Republic)

9 February 2011; 19:30	Kadetten Schaffhausen (Switzerland)	30 – 35	(Belarus) HC Dinamo-Minsk	Schweizersbildhalle, Schaffhausen; Attendance: 900; Referees: Buy, Pichon (France)
9 February 2011; 19:30	Patrail 9	(12–18)	Pukhouski 8	Schweizersbildhalle, Schaffhausen; Attendance: 900; Referees: Buy, Pichon (France)
9 February 2011; 19:30	3× (yellow card) 4× (suspension) 1× (red card)	Report	3× (yellow card) 3× (suspension)	Schweizersbildhalle, Schaffhausen; Attendance: 900; Referees: Buy, Pichon (France)

19 February 2011; 17:30	Kadetten Schaffhausen (Switzerland)	31 – 27	(Hungary) Pick Szeged	Schweizersbildhalle, Schaffhausen; Attendance: 1,200; Referees: Schaller, Wutzler (Germany)
19 February 2011; 17:30	Patrail 8	(12–15)	three players 5	Schweizersbildhalle, Schaffhausen; Attendance: 1,200; Referees: Schaller, Wutzler (Germany)
19 February 2011; 17:30	3× (yellow card) 7× (suspension)	Report	3× (yellow card) 7× (suspension)	Schweizersbildhalle, Schaffhausen; Attendance: 1,200; Referees: Schaller, Wutzler (Germany)

19 February 2011; 18:00	BM Valladolid (Spain)	27 – 27	(Belarus) HC Dinamo-Minsk	Polideportivo Pisuerga, Valladolid; Attendance: 5,500; Referees: Veber, Pangerc (Slovenia)
19 February 2011; 18:00	Joli, Tvedten 7	(10–14)	Atman 9	Polideportivo Pisuerga, Valladolid; Attendance: 5,500; Referees: Veber, Pangerc (Slovenia)
19 February 2011; 18:00	3× (yellow card) 4× (suspension)	Report	3× (yellow card) 5× (suspension)	Polideportivo Pisuerga, Valladolid; Attendance: 5,500; Referees: Veber, Pangerc (Slovenia)

20 February 2011; 15:50	AaB Handball (Denmark)	30 – 38	(Russia) Chekhovskiye Medvedi	Gigantium, Aalborg; Attendance: 2,600; Referees: Cirligeanu, Bejinariu (Romania)
20 February 2011; 15:50	Lennartsson 8	(15–19)	Filippov 7	Gigantium, Aalborg; Attendance: 2,600; Referees: Cirligeanu, Bejinariu (Romania)
20 February 2011; 15:50	3× (yellow card) 1× (suspension)	Report	2× (yellow card) 6× (suspension)	Gigantium, Aalborg; Attendance: 2,600; Referees: Cirligeanu, Bejinariu (Romania)

23 February 2011; 19:30	Kadetten Schaffhausen (Switzerland)	32 – 29	(Russia) Chekhovskiye Medvedi	Schweizersbildhalle, Schaffhausen; Attendance: 1,100; Referees: Nikolic, Stojkovic (Serbia)
23 February 2011; 19:30	Stojanović 6	(15–16)	Harbok, Kovalev 6	Schweizersbildhalle, Schaffhausen; Attendance: 1,100; Referees: Nikolic, Stojkovic (Serbia)
23 February 2011; 19:30	3× (yellow card) 6× (suspension)	Report	3× (yellow card) 6× (suspension) 1× (red card)	Schweizersbildhalle, Schaffhausen; Attendance: 1,100; Referees: Nikolic, Stojkovic (Serbia)

26 February 2011; 18:00	Pick Szeged (Hungary)	30 – 25	(Spain) BM Valladolid	Városi Sportcsarnok, Szeged; Attendance: 3,800; Referees: Hakansson, Nilsson (Sweden)
26 February 2011; 18:00	Butenko 7	(17–13)	Joli 6	Városi Sportcsarnok, Szeged; Attendance: 3,800; Referees: Hakansson, Nilsson (Sweden)
26 February 2011; 18:00	3× (yellow card) 4× (suspension) 1× (red card)	Report	3× (yellow card) 7× (suspension)	Városi Sportcsarnok, Szeged; Attendance: 3,800; Referees: Hakansson, Nilsson (Sweden)

27 February 2011; 15:00	HC Dinamo-Minsk (Belarus)	33 – 31	(Denmark) AaB Handball	Minsk Sports Palace, Minsk; Attendance: 2,700; Referees: Erdogan, Özdeniz (Turkey)
27 February 2011; 15:00	Atman 9	(16–17)	Christiansen 8	Minsk Sports Palace, Minsk; Attendance: 2,700; Referees: Erdogan, Özdeniz (Turkey)
27 February 2011; 15:00	3× (yellow card) 1× (suspension)	Report	3× (yellow card)	Minsk Sports Palace, Minsk; Attendance: 2,700; Referees: Erdogan, Özdeniz (Turkey)

3 March 2011; 19:00	Chekhovskiye Medvedi (Russia)	28 – 28	(Belarus) HC Dinamo-Minsk	Sporthall Olimpijski, Chekhov; Attendance: 1,800; Referees: Liachovicius, Gecevicius (Lithuania)
3 March 2011; 19:00	Dibirov, Kovalev 5	(15–14)	Atman 8	Sporthall Olimpijski, Chekhov; Attendance: 1,800; Referees: Liachovicius, Gecevicius (Lithuania)
3 March 2011; 19:00	3× (yellow card) 3× (suspension)	Report	3× (yellow card) 3× (suspension)	Sporthall Olimpijski, Chekhov; Attendance: 1,800; Referees: Liachovicius, Gecevicius (Lithuania)

5 March 2011; 18:00	BM Valladolid (Spain)	35 – 26	(Switzerland) Kadetten Schaffhausen	Polideportivo Pisuerga, Valladolid; Attendance: 6,000; Referees: Lazaar, Reveret (France)
5 March 2011; 18:00	Joli 8	(15–13)	Stojanović, Ursic 5	Polideportivo Pisuerga, Valladolid; Attendance: 6,000; Referees: Lazaar, Reveret (France)
5 March 2011; 18:00	3× (yellow card) 3× (suspension)	Report	3× (yellow card) 4× (suspension)	Polideportivo Pisuerga, Valladolid; Attendance: 6,000; Referees: Lazaar, Reveret (France)

6 March 2011; 15:50	AaB Handball (Denmark)	34 – 30	(Hungary) Pick Szeged	Gigantium, Aalborg; Attendance: 1,100; Referees: Abrahamsen, Kristiansen (Norway)
6 March 2011; 15:50	Larholm 11	(17–19)	Törö 6	Gigantium, Aalborg; Attendance: 1,100; Referees: Abrahamsen, Kristiansen (Norway)
6 March 2011; 15:50	3× (yellow card) 3× (suspension)	Report	3× (yellow card) 5× (suspension)	Gigantium, Aalborg; Attendance: 1,100; Referees: Abrahamsen, Kristiansen (Norway)

==== Group D ====
Team	Pld	W	D	L	GF	GA	GD	Pts
(Spain) BM Ciudad Real	10	8	1	1	303	236	+67	17
(Germany) SG Flensburg-Handewitt	10	8	0	2	288	249	+39	16
(Croatia) RK Zagreb	10	6	2	2	303	261	+42	14
(Bosnia and Herzegovina) RK Bosna Sarajevo	10	2	1	7	222	286	−64	5
(Russia) St. Petersburg HC	10	2	0	8	259	302	−43	4
(Romania) HCM Constanța	10	2	0	8	261	302	−41	4

All times are local

22 September 2010; 19:00	St. Petersburg HC (Russia)	32 – 27	(Bosnia and Herzegovina) RK Bosna Sarajevo	Sportkompleks "Ubileyniy", St. Petersburg; Attendance: 2,500; Referees: Kekes, Kekes (Hungary)
22 September 2010; 19:00	Shindin 9	(11–12)	Arnaudovski 7	Sportkompleks "Ubileyniy", St. Petersburg; Attendance: 2,500; Referees: Kekes, Kekes (Hungary)
22 September 2010; 19:00	3× (yellow card) 6× (suspension) 1× (red card)	Report	3× (yellow card) 6× (suspension)	Sportkompleks "Ubileyniy", St. Petersburg; Attendance: 2,500; Referees: Kekes, Kekes (Hungary)

22 September 2010; 20:30	BM Ciudad Real (Spain)	27 – 19	(Germany) SG Flensburg-Handewitt	Quijote Arena, Ciudad Real; Attendance: 2,200; Referees: Hakansson, Nilsson (Sweden)
22 September 2010; 20:30	Lazarov 8	(7–9)	Fahlgren, Hansen 4	Quijote Arena, Ciudad Real; Attendance: 2,200; Referees: Hakansson, Nilsson (Sweden)
22 September 2010; 20:30	4× (yellow card) 2× (suspension) 1× (red card)	Report	3× (yellow card) 6× (suspension)	Quijote Arena, Ciudad Real; Attendance: 2,200; Referees: Hakansson, Nilsson (Sweden)

23 September 2010; 19:00	HCM Constanța (Romania)	23 – 33	(Croatia) RK Zagreb	Sala Sporturilor, Constanța; Attendance: 1,800; Referees: Andersen, Sodal (Norway)
23 September 2010; 19:00	Csepreghi 7	(9–15)	Vukić 13	Sala Sporturilor, Constanța; Attendance: 1,800; Referees: Andersen, Sodal (Norway)
23 September 2010; 19:00	2× (yellow card) 3× (suspension)	Report	2× (yellow card) 6× (suspension) 1× (red card)	Sala Sporturilor, Constanța; Attendance: 1,800; Referees: Andersen, Sodal (Norway)

2 October 2010; 14:00	St. Petersburg HC (Russia)	23 – 32	(Spain) BM Ciudad Real	Sportkompleks "Ubileyniy", St. Petersburg; Attendance: 2,800; Referees: Gjeding, Hansen (Denmark)
2 October 2010; 14:00	Nasyrov 5	(9–14)	Lazarov 7	Sportkompleks "Ubileyniy", St. Petersburg; Attendance: 2,800; Referees: Gjeding, Hansen (Denmark)
2 October 2010; 14:00	3× (yellow card) 5× (suspension)	Report	2× (yellow card) 1× (suspension)	Sportkompleks "Ubileyniy", St. Petersburg; Attendance: 2,800; Referees: Gjeding, Hansen (Denmark)

2 October 2010; 15:30	SG Flensburg-Handewitt (Germany)	29 – 22	(Romania) HCM Constanța	Campushalle, Flensburg; Attendance: 3,500; Referees: Dobrovits, Tajok (Hungary)
2 October 2010; 15:30	Eggert Jensen 9	(15–7)	Toma 10	Campushalle, Flensburg; Attendance: 3,500; Referees: Dobrovits, Tajok (Hungary)
2 October 2010; 15:30	3× (yellow card) 3× (suspension)	Report	2× (yellow card) 1× (suspension)	Campushalle, Flensburg; Attendance: 3,500; Referees: Dobrovits, Tajok (Hungary)

2 October 2010; 19:00	RK Bosna Sarajevo (Bosnia and Herzegovina)	26 – 26	(Croatia) RK Zagreb	Dvorana Mirza Delibašić, Sarajevo; Attendance: 2,500; Referees: Krstic, Ljubic (Slovenia)
2 October 2010; 19:00	Karacic 9	(12–13)	Strlek 9	Dvorana Mirza Delibašić, Sarajevo; Attendance: 2,500; Referees: Krstic, Ljubic (Slovenia)
2 October 2010; 19:00	3× (yellow card) 5× (suspension)	Report	3× (yellow card) 5× (suspension)	Dvorana Mirza Delibašić, Sarajevo; Attendance: 2,500; Referees: Krstic, Ljubic (Slovenia)

7 October 2010; 19:00	St. Petersburg HC (Russia)	28 – 35	(Croatia) RK Zagreb	Sportkompleks "Ubileyniy", St. Petersburg; Attendance: 1,500; Referees: Dentz, Reibel (France)
7 October 2010; 19:00	Mukhin 7	(12–16)	Valčić 6	Sportkompleks "Ubileyniy", St. Petersburg; Attendance: 1,500; Referees: Dentz, Reibel (France)
7 October 2010; 19:00	3× (yellow card) 5× (suspension)	Report	3× (yellow card) 6× (suspension)	Sportkompleks "Ubileyniy", St. Petersburg; Attendance: 1,500; Referees: Dentz, Reibel (France)

9 October 2010; 18:00	RK Bosna Sarajevo (Bosnia and Herzegovina)	23 – 35	(Germany) SG Flensburg-Handewitt	Dvorana Mirza Delibašić, Sarajevo; Attendance: 2,500; Referees: Baranowski, Lemanowicz (Poland)
9 October 2010; 18:00	Karacic 7	(9–18)	Hansen 10	Dvorana Mirza Delibašić, Sarajevo; Attendance: 2,500; Referees: Baranowski, Lemanowicz (Poland)
9 October 2010; 18:00	3× (yellow card) 4× (suspension)	Report	3× (yellow card) 5× (suspension)	Dvorana Mirza Delibašić, Sarajevo; Attendance: 2,500; Referees: Baranowski, Lemanowicz (Poland)

10 October 2010; 19:00	BM Ciudad Real (Spain)	34 – 28	(Romania) HCM Constanta	Quijote Arena, Ciudad Real; Attendance: 3,200; Referees: Eliasson, Gudjonsson (Iceland)
10 October 2010; 19:00	Lazarov 8	(15–12)	Sadoveac 7	Quijote Arena, Ciudad Real; Attendance: 3,200; Referees: Eliasson, Gudjonsson (Iceland)
10 October 2010; 19:00	2× (yellow card) 3× (suspension)	Report	3× (yellow card) 7× (suspension) 1× (red card)	Quijote Arena, Ciudad Real; Attendance: 3,200; Referees: Eliasson, Gudjonsson (Iceland)

14 October 2010; 19:00	HCM Constanța (Romania)	26 – 25	(Bosnia and Herzegovina) RK Bosna Sarajevo	Sala Sporturilor, Constanța; Attendance: 1,800; Referees: Gousko, Repkin (Belarus)
14 October 2010; 19:00	Toma 7	(16–12)	Medic 7	Sala Sporturilor, Constanța; Attendance: 1,800; Referees: Gousko, Repkin (Belarus)
14 October 2010; 19:00	2× (yellow card) 3× (suspension)	Report	3× (yellow card) 5× (suspension)	Sala Sporturilor, Constanța; Attendance: 1,800; Referees: Gousko, Repkin (Belarus)

16 October 2010; 17:30	RK Zagreb (Croatia)	30 – 30	(Spain) BM Ciudad Real	Arena Zagreb, Zagreb; Attendance: 7,000; Referees: Canbro, Claesson (Sweden)
16 October 2010; 17:30	Valčić 7	(14–14)	Entrerrios 6	Arena Zagreb, Zagreb; Attendance: 7,000; Referees: Canbro, Claesson (Sweden)
16 October 2010; 17:30	3× (yellow card) 5× (suspension)	Report	3× (yellow card) 1× (suspension)	Arena Zagreb, Zagreb; Attendance: 7,000; Referees: Canbro, Claesson (Sweden)

17 October 2010; 16:45	SG Flensburg-Handewitt (Germany)	34 – 22	(Russia) St. Petersburg HC	Campushalle, Flensburg; Attendance: 3,900; Referees: Lazaar, Reveret (France)
17 October 2010; 16:45	Mogensen 9	(17–14)	Nasyrov 6	Campushalle, Flensburg; Attendance: 3,900; Referees: Lazaar, Reveret (France)
17 October 2010; 16:45	2× (yellow card) 3× (suspension)	Report	3× (yellow card) 6× (suspension)	Campushalle, Flensburg; Attendance: 3,900; Referees: Lazaar, Reveret (France)

18 November 2010; 19:30	HCM Constanța (Romania)	29 – 28	(Russia) St. Petersburg HC	Sala Sporturilor, Constanța; Attendance: 1,600; Referees: Kohout, Novak (Czech Republic)
18 November 2010; 19:30	Stavrositu 7	(16–13)	Nasyrov 7	Sala Sporturilor, Constanța; Attendance: 1,600; Referees: Kohout, Novak (Czech Republic)
18 November 2010; 19:30	3× (yellow card) 4× (suspension)	Report	3× (yellow card) 5× (suspension) 1× (red card)	Sala Sporturilor, Constanța; Attendance: 1,600; Referees: Kohout, Novak (Czech Republic)

20 November 2010; 19:00	RK Bosna Sarajevo (Bosnia and Herzegovina)	22 – 29	(Spain) BM Ciudad Real	Dvorana Mirza Delibašić, Sarajevo; Attendance: 3,500; Referees: Kouz, Zhoba (Ukraine)
20 November 2010; 19:00	Celica 8	(11–16)	Lazarov 7	Dvorana Mirza Delibašić, Sarajevo; Attendance: 3,500; Referees: Kouz, Zhoba (Ukraine)
20 November 2010; 19:00	3× (yellow card) 6× (suspension)	Report	3× (yellow card) 4× (suspension)	Dvorana Mirza Delibašić, Sarajevo; Attendance: 3,500; Referees: Kouz, Zhoba (Ukraine)

21 November 2010; 15:30	SG Flensburg-Handewitt (Germany)	32 – 29	(Croatia) RK Zagreb	Campushalle, Flensburg; Attendance: 6,200; Referees: Horacek, Novotny (Czech Republic)
21 November 2010; 15:30	Mogensen 8	(19–15)	Horvat 9	Campushalle, Flensburg; Attendance: 6,200; Referees: Horacek, Novotny (Czech Republic)
21 November 2010; 15:30	3× (yellow card) 3× (suspension)	Report	3× (yellow card) 6× (suspension)	Campushalle, Flensburg; Attendance: 6,200; Referees: Horacek, Novotny (Czech Republic)

24 November 2010; 19:00	St. Petersburg HC (Russia)	29 – 26	(Romania) HCM Constanta	Sportkompleks "Ubileyniy", St. Petersburg; Attendance: 2,000; Referees: Pedersen, Mortensen (Denmark)
24 November 2010; 19:00	Shindin 10	(14–13)	three players 4	Sportkompleks "Ubileyniy", St. Petersburg; Attendance: 2,000; Referees: Pedersen, Mortensen (Denmark)
24 November 2010; 19:00	3× (yellow card) 7× (suspension) 1× (red card)	Report	2× (yellow card) 4× (suspension)	Sportkompleks "Ubileyniy", St. Petersburg; Attendance: 2,000; Referees: Pedersen, Mortensen (Denmark)

28 November 2010; 16:45	BM Ciudad Real (Spain)	32 – 17	(Bosnia and Herzegovina) RK Bosna Sarajevo	Quijote Arena, Ciudad Real; Attendance: 2,900; Referees: Chaskis, Tsakonas (Greece)
28 November 2010; 16:45	five players 4	(14–6)	Karacic 4	Quijote Arena, Ciudad Real; Attendance: 2,900; Referees: Chaskis, Tsakonas (Greece)
28 November 2010; 16:45	2× (yellow card) 1× (suspension)	Report	3× (yellow card) 5× (suspension) 1× (red card)	Quijote Arena, Ciudad Real; Attendance: 2,900; Referees: Chaskis, Tsakonas (Greece)

28 November 2010; 17:30	RK Zagreb (Croatia)	31 – 26	(Germany) SG Flensburg-Handewitt	Arena Zagreb, Zagreb; Attendance: 9,500; Referees: Gousko, Repkin (Belarus)
28 November 2010; 17:30	Horvat 10	(14–12)	Mogensen 7	Arena Zagreb, Zagreb; Attendance: 9,500; Referees: Gousko, Repkin (Belarus)
28 November 2010; 17:30	3× (yellow card) 4× (suspension)	Report	3× (yellow card) 2× (suspension)	Arena Zagreb, Zagreb; Attendance: 9,500; Referees: Gousko, Repkin (Belarus)

2 December 2010; 20:00	HCM Constanța (Romania)	29 – 32	(Germany) SG Flensburg-Handewitt	Sala Sporturilor, Constanța; Attendance: 1,100; Referees: Krstic, Ljubic (Slovenia)
2 December 2010; 20:00	Stavrositu 6	(12–17)	Eggert Jensen 8	Sala Sporturilor, Constanța; Attendance: 1,100; Referees: Krstic, Ljubic (Slovenia)
2 December 2010; 20:00	3× (yellow card) 2× (suspension)	Report	3× (yellow card) 5× (suspension)	Sala Sporturilor, Constanța; Attendance: 1,100; Referees: Krstic, Ljubic (Slovenia)

4 December 2010; 17:30	RK Zagreb (Croatia)	34 – 15	(Bosnia and Herzegovina) RK Bosna Sarajevo	Arena Zagreb, Zagreb; Attendance: 7,500; Referees: Nikolov, Nachevski (Macedonia)
4 December 2010; 17:30	Kopljar 6	(16–8)	Karacic 4	Arena Zagreb, Zagreb; Attendance: 7,500; Referees: Nikolov, Nachevski (Macedonia)
4 December 2010; 17:30	3× (yellow card) 8× (suspension)	Report	3× (yellow card) 5× (suspension)	Arena Zagreb, Zagreb; Attendance: 7,500; Referees: Nikolov, Nachevski (Macedonia)

9 February 2011; 19:00	BM Ciudad Real (Spain)	32 – 27	(Russia) St. Petersburg HC	Quijote Arena, Ciudad Real; Attendance: 2,800; Referees: Santos, Fonseca (Portugal)
9 February 2011; 19:00	Davis Camara, Shevelev 5	(12–13)	Nasyrov, Pronin 4	Quijote Arena, Ciudad Real; Attendance: 2,800; Referees: Santos, Fonseca (Portugal)
9 February 2011; 19:00	3× (yellow card) 3× (suspension)	Report	3× (yellow card) 5× (suspension)	Quijote Arena, Ciudad Real; Attendance: 2,800; Referees: Santos, Fonseca (Portugal)

19 February 2011; 17:30	RK Zagreb (Croatia)	34 – 30	(Romania) HCM Constanța	Arena Zagreb, Zagreb; Attendance: 6,000; Referees: Cohen, Peretz (Israel)
19 February 2011; 17:30	Strlek 10	(19–16)	Toma 9	Arena Zagreb, Zagreb; Attendance: 6,000; Referees: Cohen, Peretz (Israel)
19 February 2011; 17:30	3× (yellow card) 3× (suspension)	Report	3× (yellow card) 1× (suspension)	Arena Zagreb, Zagreb; Attendance: 6,000; Referees: Cohen, Peretz (Israel)

19 February 2011; 19:00	RK Bosna Sarajevo (Bosnia and Herzegovina)	25 – 24	(Russia) St. Petersburg HC	Dvorana Mirza Delibašić, Sarajevo; Attendance: 2,500; Referees: Leszczynski, Piechota (Poland)
19 February 2011; 19:00	Celica 7	(16–11)	Polyakov 6	Dvorana Mirza Delibašić, Sarajevo; Attendance: 2,500; Referees: Leszczynski, Piechota (Poland)
19 February 2011; 19:00	3× (yellow card) 8× (suspension) 2× (red card)	Report	3× (yellow card) 8× (suspension) 2× (red card)	Dvorana Mirza Delibašić, Sarajevo; Attendance: 2,500; Referees: Leszczynski, Piechota (Poland)

20 February 2011; 18:45	SG Flensburg-Handewitt (Germany)	25 – 23	(Spain) BM Ciudad Real	Campushalle, Flensburg; Attendance: 6000; Referees: Buy, Pichon (France)
20 February 2011; 18:45	Eggert Jensen 9	(11–10)	Abalo 5	Campushalle, Flensburg; Attendance: 6000; Referees: Buy, Pichon (France)
20 February 2011; 18:45	3× (yellow card) 3× (suspension)	Report	3× (yellow card) 1× (suspension)	Campushalle, Flensburg; Attendance: 6000; Referees: Buy, Pichon (France)

24 February 2011; 19:00	St. Petersburg HC (Russia)	25 – 31	(Germany) SG Flensburg-Handewitt	Sportkompleks "Ubileyniy", St. Petersburg; Attendance: 2,000; Referees: Wyss, Zowa (Switzerland)
24 February 2011; 19:00	Orlov, Sanashkin 4	(9–17)	Eggert Jensen 9	Sportkompleks "Ubileyniy", St. Petersburg; Attendance: 2,000; Referees: Wyss, Zowa (Switzerland)
24 February 2011; 19:00	3× (yellow card) 3× (suspension)	Report	2× (yellow card) 2× (suspension)	Sportkompleks "Ubileyniy", St. Petersburg; Attendance: 2,000; Referees: Wyss, Zowa (Switzerland)

26 February 2011; 19:00	RK Bosna Sarajevo (Bosnia and Herzegovina)	24 – 23	(Romania) HCM Constanța	Dvorana Mirza Delibašić, Sarajevo; Attendance: 4,000; Referees: Mazeika, Gatelis (Lithuania)
26 February 2011; 19:00	Karacic 11	(11–13)	Angelovski 6	Dvorana Mirza Delibašić, Sarajevo; Attendance: 4,000; Referees: Mazeika, Gatelis (Lithuania)
26 February 2011; 19:00	3× (yellow card) 8× (suspension)	Report	3× (yellow card) 6× (suspension) 1× (red card)	Dvorana Mirza Delibašić, Sarajevo; Attendance: 4,000; Referees: Mazeika, Gatelis (Lithuania)

27 February 2011; 19:00	BM Ciudad Real (Spain)	30 – 20	(Croatia) RK Zagreb	Quijote Arena, Ciudad Real; Attendance: 3,800; Referees: Gjeding, Hansen (Denmark)
27 February 2011; 19:00	Guardiola Villaplana, Jurkiewicz 4	(16–12)	Strlek 5	Quijote Arena, Ciudad Real; Attendance: 3,800; Referees: Gjeding, Hansen (Denmark)
27 February 2011; 19:00	1× (yellow card) 1× (suspension)	Report	3× (yellow card) 4× (suspension)	Quijote Arena, Ciudad Real; Attendance: 3,800; Referees: Gjeding, Hansen (Denmark)

2 March 2011; 19:00	SG Flensburg-Handewitt (Germany)	25 – 18	(Bosnia and Herzegovina) RK Bosna Sarajevo	Campushalle, Flensburg; Attendance: 5,300; Referees: Samuelsen, Hansen (Faroe Islands)
2 March 2011; 19:00	Eggert Jensen 6	(13–9)	Čelica, Karačić 4	Campushalle, Flensburg; Attendance: 5,300; Referees: Samuelsen, Hansen (Faroe Islands)
2 March 2011; 19:00	2× (yellow card) 3× (suspension) 1× (red card)	Report	2× (yellow card) 3× (suspension)	Campushalle, Flensburg; Attendance: 5,300; Referees: Samuelsen, Hansen (Faroe Islands)

3 March 2011; 19:00	HCM Constanța (Romania)	25 – 34	(Spain) BM Ciudad Real	Sala Sporturilor, Constanța; Attendance: 1,500; Referees: Horváth, Marton (Hungary)
3 March 2011; 19:00	Toma 5	(10–15)	Davis, Källman 6	Sala Sporturilor, Constanța; Attendance: 1,500; Referees: Horváth, Marton (Hungary)
3 March 2011; 19:00	3× (yellow card) 1× (suspension)	Report	3× (yellow card) 1× (suspension)	Sala Sporturilor, Constanța; Attendance: 1,500; Referees: Horváth, Marton (Hungary)

5 March 2011; 17:30	RK Zagreb (Croatia)	31 – 21	(Russia) St. Petersburg HC	Arena Zagreb, Zagreb; Attendance: 6,000; Referees: Johansson, Kliko (Sweden)
5 March 2011; 17:30	Stepančić, Strlek 6	(16–11)	three players 4	Arena Zagreb, Zagreb; Attendance: 6,000; Referees: Johansson, Kliko (Sweden)
5 March 2011; 17:30	3× (yellow card) 4× (suspension)	Report	3× (yellow card) 4× (suspension)	Arena Zagreb, Zagreb; Attendance: 6,000; Referees: Johansson, Kliko (Sweden)

== Knockout stage ==
=== Last 16 ===
The draw was held on March 7, 2011 at 19:00 in Vienna, Austria. The first leg was played on 24–27 March 2011 and the second leg on 31 March–3 April 2011.

Team #1	Agg.	Team #2	1st match	2nd match
Kadetten Schaffhausen (Switzerland)	58–61	(France) Montpellier HB	31–26	27–35
KIF Kolding (Denmark)	53–72	(Germany) THW Kiel	29–36	24–36
Chambéry Savoie (France)	43–63	(Spain) BM Ciudad Real	24–27	19–36
RK Bosna Sarajevo (Bosnia and Herzegovina)	39–61	(Russia) Chekhovskiye Medvedi	22–31	17–30
Pick Szeged (Hungary)	46–60	(Germany) SG Flensburg-Handewitt	26–27	20–33
F.C. Barcelona Borges (Spain)	54–51	(Hungary) MKB Veszprém	28–21	26–30
RK Zagreb (Croatia)	55–58	(Germany) Rhein-Neckar Löwen	28–31	27–27
HSV Hamburg (Germany)	63–55	(Spain) BM Valladolid	28–22	35–33

==== First match ====
24 March 2011; 19:30	HSV Hamburg (Germany)	28 – 22	(Spain) BM Valladolid	O2 World Hamburg, Hamburg; Attendance: 2,100; Referees: Zotin, Volodkov (Russia)
24 March 2011; 19:30	Hens, Lindberg 6	(11–15)	Tvedten 8	O2 World Hamburg, Hamburg; Attendance: 2,100; Referees: Zotin, Volodkov (Russia)
24 March 2011; 19:30	3× (yellow card) 3× (suspension)	Report	1× (yellow card) 8× (suspension) 1× (red card)	O2 World Hamburg, Hamburg; Attendance: 2,100; Referees: Zotin, Volodkov (Russia)

24 March 2011; 20:30	Kadetten Schaffhausen (Switzerland)	31 – 26	(France) Montpellier HB	Schweizersbildhalle, Schaffhausen; Attendance: 2,400; Referees: Leifsson, Palsson (Iceland)
24 March 2011; 20:30	Goepfert, Ursic 7	(17–11)	Bojinovic 6	Schweizersbildhalle, Schaffhausen; Attendance: 2,400; Referees: Leifsson, Palsson (Iceland)
24 March 2011; 20:30	3× (yellow card) 5× (suspension)	Report	3× (yellow card) 3× (suspension)	Schweizersbildhalle, Schaffhausen; Attendance: 2,400; Referees: Leifsson, Palsson (Iceland)

26 March 2011; 14:30	Pick Szeged (Hungary)	26 – 27	(Germany) SG Flensburg-Handewitt	Városi Sportcsarnok, Szeged; Attendance: 3,500; Referees: Andersen, Sodal (Norway)
26 March 2011; 14:30	Katzirz 6	(12–9)	Eggert 8	Városi Sportcsarnok, Szeged; Attendance: 3,500; Referees: Andersen, Sodal (Norway)
26 March 2011; 14:30	2× (yellow card) 3× (suspension)	Report	3× (yellow card) 5× (suspension)	Városi Sportcsarnok, Szeged; Attendance: 3,500; Referees: Andersen, Sodal (Norway)

26 March 2011; 16:15	KIF Kolding (Denmark)	29 – 36	(Germany) THW Kiel	Kolding Hallen, Kolding; Attendance: 3,000; Referees: Lazaar, Reveret (France)
26 March 2011; 16:15	Karlsson 8	(16–17)	Jicha 9	Kolding Hallen, Kolding; Attendance: 3,000; Referees: Lazaar, Reveret (France)
26 March 2011; 16:15	3× (yellow card) 2× (suspension)	Report	1× (yellow card) 6× (suspension)	Kolding Hallen, Kolding; Attendance: 3,000; Referees: Lazaar, Reveret (France)

27 March 2011; 17:00	Chambéry Savoie (France)	24 – 27	(Spain) BM Ciudad Real	Le Phare, Chambéry; Attendance: 4,400; Referees: Kohout, Novak (Czech Republic)
27 March 2011; 17:00	Bašić 8	(11–15)	Entrerríos 5	Le Phare, Chambéry; Attendance: 4,400; Referees: Kohout, Novak (Czech Republic)
27 March 2011; 17:00	3× (yellow card) 4× (suspension)	Report	3× (yellow card) 4× (suspension)	Le Phare, Chambéry; Attendance: 4,400; Referees: Kohout, Novak (Czech Republic)

27 March 2011; 17:30	F.C. Barcelona Borges (Spain)	28 – 21	(Hungary) MKB Veszprém	Palau Blaugrana, Blaugrana; Attendance: 5,200; Referees: Olesen, Pedersen (Denmark)
27 March 2011; 17:30	García, Tomás 6	(14–13)	Sulić 5	Palau Blaugrana, Blaugrana; Attendance: 5,200; Referees: Olesen, Pedersen (Denmark)
27 March 2011; 17:30	3× (yellow card) 2× (suspension)	Report	3× (yellow card) 7× (suspension)	Palau Blaugrana, Blaugrana; Attendance: 5,200; Referees: Olesen, Pedersen (Denmark)

27 March 2011; 18:00	RK Bosna Sarajevo (Bosnia and Herzegovina)	22 – 31	(Russia) Chekhovskiye Medvedi	Dvorana Mirza Delibašić, Sarajevo; Attendance: 3,500; Referees: Nielsen, Lorentzen (Denmark)
27 March 2011; 18:00	Raković 4	(7–16)	Dibirov 6	Dvorana Mirza Delibašić, Sarajevo; Attendance: 3,500; Referees: Nielsen, Lorentzen (Denmark)
27 March 2011; 18:00	2× (yellow card) 2× (suspension)	Report	3× (yellow card) 5× (suspension)	Dvorana Mirza Delibašić, Sarajevo; Attendance: 3,500; Referees: Nielsen, Lorentzen (Denmark)

27 March 2011; 18:00	RK Zagreb (Croatia)	28 – 31	(Germany) Rhein-Neckar Löwen	Arena Zagreb, Zagreb; Attendance: 10,000; Referees: Abrahamsen, Kristiansen (Norway)
27 March 2011; 18:00	three players 5	(12–15)	Gensheimer 10	Arena Zagreb, Zagreb; Attendance: 10,000; Referees: Abrahamsen, Kristiansen (Norway)
27 March 2011; 18:00	3× (yellow card) 4× (suspension)	Report	3× (yellow card) 5× (suspension)	Arena Zagreb, Zagreb; Attendance: 10,000; Referees: Abrahamsen, Kristiansen (Norway)

==== Second match ====
31 March 2011; 19:00	Chekhovskiye Medvedi (Russia)	30 – 17	(Bosnia and Herzegovina) RK Bosna Sarajevo	Sporthall Olimpijski, Chekhov; Attendance: 2,700; Referees: Badura, Ondogrecula (Slovakia)
31 March 2011; 19:00	Aslanyan 6	(11–9)	Karačić 7	Sporthall Olimpijski, Chekhov; Attendance: 2,700; Referees: Badura, Ondogrecula (Slovakia)
31 March 2011; 19:00	3× (yellow card) 3× (suspension)	Report	3× (yellow card) 5× (suspension)	Sporthall Olimpijski, Chekhov; Attendance: 2,700; Referees: Badura, Ondogrecula (Slovakia)

31 March 2011; 19:00	Rhein-Neckar Löwen (Germany)	27 – 27	(Croatia) RK Zagreb	SAP Arena, Mannheim; Attendance: 7,700; Referees: Lopez, Ramirez (Spain)
31 March 2011; 19:00	Gensheimer 9	(11–9)	Špiler 9	SAP Arena, Mannheim; Attendance: 7,700; Referees: Lopez, Ramirez (Spain)
31 March 2011; 19:00	3× (yellow card) 4× (suspension)	Report	2× (yellow card) 4× (suspension)	SAP Arena, Mannheim; Attendance: 7,700; Referees: Lopez, Ramirez (Spain)

2 April 2011; 16:00	BM Ciudad Real (Spain)	36 – 19	(France) Chambéry Savoie	Quijote Arena, Ciudad Real; Attendance: 2,900; Referees: Geipel, Helbig (Germany)
2 April 2011; 16:00	Lazarov 7	(18–8)	Busselier 5	Quijote Arena, Ciudad Real; Attendance: 2,900; Referees: Geipel, Helbig (Germany)
2 April 2011; 16:00	3× (yellow card) 1× (suspension)	Report	3× (yellow card) 3× (suspension)	Quijote Arena, Ciudad Real; Attendance: 2,900; Referees: Geipel, Helbig (Germany)

2 April 2011; 16:15	MKB Veszprém (Hungary)	30 – 26	(Spain) F.C. Barcelona Borges	Veszprém Aréna, Veszprém; Attendance: 5,100; Referees: Methe, Methe (Germany)
2 April 2011; 16:15	Vujin 11	(15–8)	García 9	Veszprém Aréna, Veszprém; Attendance: 5,100; Referees: Methe, Methe (Germany)
2 April 2011; 16:15	3× (yellow card) 6× (suspension)	Report	3× (yellow card) 3× (suspension)	Veszprém Aréna, Veszprém; Attendance: 5,100; Referees: Methe, Methe (Germany)

2 April 2011; 17:00	THW Kiel (Germany)	36 – 24	(Denmark) KIF Kolding	Sparkassen-Arena, Kiel; Attendance: 9,500; Referees: Nikolov, Nachevski (Macedonia)
2 April 2011; 17:00	Ilić, Reichmann 6	(20–11)	Christiansen, Sarup 7	Sparkassen-Arena, Kiel; Attendance: 9,500; Referees: Nikolov, Nachevski (Macedonia)
2 April 2011; 17:00	2× (yellow card) 3× (suspension)	Report	3× (yellow card) 2× (suspension)	Sparkassen-Arena, Kiel; Attendance: 9,500; Referees: Nikolov, Nachevski (Macedonia)

3 April 2011; 17:00	Montpellier HB (France)	35 – 27	(Switzerland) Kadetten Schaffhausen	Arena Montpellier, Montpellier; Attendance: 8,500; Referees: Horváth, Marton (Hungary)
3 April 2011; 17:00	Accambray 8	(21–14)	Ursic 7	Arena Montpellier, Montpellier; Attendance: 8,500; Referees: Horváth, Marton (Hungary)
3 April 2011; 17:00	3× (yellow card) 5× (suspension)	Report	3× (yellow card) 6× (suspension)	Arena Montpellier, Montpellier; Attendance: 8,500; Referees: Horváth, Marton (Hungary)

3 April 2011; 18:00	BM Valladolid (Spain)	33 – 35	(Germany) HSV Hamburg	Polideportivo Pisuerga, Valladolid; Attendance: 5,300; Referees: Nikolic, Stojkovic (Serbia)
3 April 2011; 18:00	Tvedten 9	(16–19)	Lindberg 8	Polideportivo Pisuerga, Valladolid; Attendance: 5,300; Referees: Nikolic, Stojkovic (Serbia)
3 April 2011; 18:00	3× (yellow card) 3× (suspension)	Report	3× (yellow card) 8× (suspension)	Polideportivo Pisuerga, Valladolid; Attendance: 5,300; Referees: Nikolic, Stojkovic (Serbia)

3 April 2011; 19:30	SG Flensburg-Handewitt (Germany)	33 – 20	(Hungary) Pick Szeged	Campushalle, Flensburg; Attendance: 6,000; Referees: Dentz, Reibel (France)
3 April 2011; 19:30	Eggert 14	(18–8)	Törő 7	Campushalle, Flensburg; Attendance: 6,000; Referees: Dentz, Reibel (France)
3 April 2011; 19:30	3× (yellow card) 4× (suspension)	Report	3× (yellow card) 7× (suspension) 1× (red card)	Campushalle, Flensburg; Attendance: 6,000; Referees: Dentz, Reibel (France)

=== Quarterfinals ===
The draw was held on April 4, 2011 at 18:30 in Vienna, Austria. The first leg was played on 20–24 April 2011, the second leg at 27 April–1 May 2011.

Team #1	Agg.	Team #2	1st match	2nd match
SG Flensburg-Handewitt (Germany)	46–59	(Spain) BM Ciudad Real	24–38	22–21
F.C. Barcelona Borges (Spain)	63–58	(Germany) THW Kiel	27–25	36–33
HSV Hamburg (Germany)	75–61	(Russia) Chekhovskiye Medvedi	38–24	37–37
Rhein-Neckar Löwen (Germany)	62–55	(France) Montpellier HB	27–29	35–26

==== First match ====
21 April 2011; 20:00	SG Flensburg-Handewitt (Germany)	24 – 38	(Spain) BM Ciudad Real	Campushalle, Flensburg; Attendance: 3,600; Referees: Krstic, Ljubic (Slovenia)
21 April 2011; 20:00	Mogensen 6	(8–19)	Lazarov 10	Campushalle, Flensburg; Attendance: 3,600; Referees: Krstic, Ljubic (Slovenia)
21 April 2011; 20:00	3× (yellow card) 2× (suspension)	Report	3× (yellow card) 4× (suspension)	Campushalle, Flensburg; Attendance: 3,600; Referees: Krstic, Ljubic (Slovenia)

23 April 2011; 15:45	HSV Hamburg (Germany)	38 – 24	(Russia) Chekhovskiye Medvedi	O2 World Hamburg, Hamburg; Attendance: 6,000; Referees: Kekes, Kekes (Hungary)
23 April 2011; 15:45	Lijewski 7	(20–15)	Filippov 4	O2 World Hamburg, Hamburg; Attendance: 6,000; Referees: Kekes, Kekes (Hungary)
23 April 2011; 15:45	3× (yellow card) 4× (suspension)	Report	3× (yellow card) 5× (suspension)	O2 World Hamburg, Hamburg; Attendance: 6,000; Referees: Kekes, Kekes (Hungary)

24 April 2011; 17:45	Rhein-Neckar Löwen (Germany)	27 – 29	(France) Montpellier HB	SAP Arena, Mannheim; Attendance: 10,500; Referees: Nikolic, Stojkovic (Serbia)
24 April 2011; 17:45	Gensheimer 7	(12–9)	Kavtičnik 7	SAP Arena, Mannheim; Attendance: 10,500; Referees: Nikolic, Stojkovic (Serbia)
24 April 2011; 17:45	3× (yellow card) 5× (suspension)	Report	3× (yellow card) 3× (suspension)	SAP Arena, Mannheim; Attendance: 10,500; Referees: Nikolic, Stojkovic (Serbia)

24 April 2011; 19:30	F.C. Barcelona Borges (Spain)	27 – 25	(Germany) THW Kiel	Palau Blaugrana, Barcelona; Attendance: 6,500; Referees: Abrahamsen, Kristiansen (Norway)
24 April 2011; 19:30	Rutenka 6	(14–15)	Ilić, Jicha 5	Palau Blaugrana, Barcelona; Attendance: 6,500; Referees: Abrahamsen, Kristiansen (Norway)
24 April 2011; 19:30	3× (yellow card) 4× (suspension)	Report	2× (yellow card) 6× (suspension)	Palau Blaugrana, Barcelona; Attendance: 6,500; Referees: Abrahamsen, Kristiansen (Norway)

==== Second match ====
30 April 2011; 15:30	Chekhovskiye Medvedi (Russia)	37 – 37	(Germany) HSV Hamburg	Sporthall Olimpijski, Chekhov; Attendance: 1,500; Referees: Lopez, Ramirez (Spain)
30 April 2011; 15:30	Harbok, Kovalev 8	(19–14)	Duvnjak 7	Sporthall Olimpijski, Chekhov; Attendance: 1,500; Referees: Lopez, Ramirez (Spain)
30 April 2011; 15:30	3× (yellow card) 6× (suspension)	Report	3× (yellow card) 4× (suspension)	Sporthall Olimpijski, Chekhov; Attendance: 1,500; Referees: Lopez, Ramirez (Spain)

30 April 2011; 17:00	Montpellier HB (France)	26 – 35	(Germany) Rhein-Neckar Löwen	Arena Montpellier, Montpellier; Referees: Gubica, Milosevic (Croatia)
30 April 2011; 17:00	Bojinović, Karabatić 6	(17–15)	Gensheimer 10	Arena Montpellier, Montpellier; Referees: Gubica, Milosevic (Croatia)
30 April 2011; 17:00	3× (yellow card) 2× (suspension)	Report	3× (yellow card) 2× (suspension)	Arena Montpellier, Montpellier; Referees: Gubica, Milosevic (Croatia)

1 May 2011; 17:00	BM Ciudad Real (Spain)	21 – 22	(Germany) SG Flensburg-Handewitt	Quijote Arena, Ciudad Real; Attendance: 3,400; Referees: Horacek, Novotny (Czech Republic)
1 May 2011; 17:00	Lazarov 7	(9–13)	Mogensen 5	Quijote Arena, Ciudad Real; Attendance: 3,400; Referees: Horacek, Novotny (Czech Republic)
1 May 2011; 17:00	3× (yellow card) 3× (suspension)	Report	3× (yellow card) 4× (suspension)	Quijote Arena, Ciudad Real; Attendance: 3,400; Referees: Horacek, Novotny (Czech Republic)

1 May 2011; 18:30	THW Kiel (Germany)	33 – 36	(Spain) F.C. Barcelona Borges	Sparkassen-Arena, Kiel; Attendance: 10,250; Referees: Gjeding, Hansen (Denmark)
1 May 2011; 18:30	Ahlm, Ilić 8	(15–19)	Rutenka 8	Sparkassen-Arena, Kiel; Attendance: 10,250; Referees: Gjeding, Hansen (Denmark)
1 May 2011; 18:30	3× (yellow card) 5× (suspension)	Report	3× (yellow card) 5× (suspension)	Sparkassen-Arena, Kiel; Attendance: 10,250; Referees: Gjeding, Hansen (Denmark)

=== Final four ===
The draw was held on 2 May 2011.

Semi-finals
28 May
(Germany) Rhein-Neckar Löwen	28
(Spain) FC Barcelona Borges	30
28 May
(Spain) BM Ciudad Real	28
(Germany) HSV Hamburg	23

Final
29 May
(Spain) FC Barcelona Borges	27
(Spain) BM Ciudad Real	24
Third place
29 May
(Germany) Rhein-Neckar Löwen	31
(Germany) HSV Hamburg	33

==== Semifinals ====
28 May 2011; 15:15	Rhein-Neckar Löwen (Germany)	28 – 30	(Spain) FC Barcelona Borges	Lanxess Arena, Cologne; Attendance: 19,250; Referees: Krstic, Ljubic (Slovenia)
28 May 2011; 15:15	Gensheimer 7	(12–12)	García, Rutenka 5	Lanxess Arena, Cologne; Attendance: 19,250; Referees: Krstic, Ljubic (Slovenia)
28 May 2011; 15:15	3× (yellow card) 4× (suspension)	Report	3× (yellow card) 4× (suspension)	Lanxess Arena, Cologne; Attendance: 19,250; Referees: Krstic, Ljubic (Slovenia)

28 May 2011; 18:00	BM Ciudad Real (Spain)	28 – 23	(Germany) HSV Hamburg	Lanxess Arena, Cologne; Attendance: 19,250; Referees: Gjeding, Hansen (Denmark)
28 May 2011; 18:00	Abalo, Entrerrios Rodriguez 6	(12–10)	Lindberg, Schröder 5	Lanxess Arena, Cologne; Attendance: 19,250; Referees: Gjeding, Hansen (Denmark)
28 May 2011; 18:00	2× (yellow card) 2× (suspension)	Report	3× (yellow card) 3× (suspension)	Lanxess Arena, Cologne; Attendance: 19,250; Referees: Gjeding, Hansen (Denmark)

==== Third place game ====
29 May 2011; 15:15	Rhein-Neckar Löwen (Germany)	31 – 33	(Germany) HSV Hamburg	Lanxess Arena, Cologne; Attendance: 19,250; Referees: Horvàth, Màrton (Hungary)
29 May 2011; 15:15	Stefansson 7	(13–15)	Gille 6	Lanxess Arena, Cologne; Attendance: 19,250; Referees: Horvàth, Màrton (Hungary)
29 May 2011; 15:15	3× (yellow card) 4× (suspension)	Report	3× (yellow card) 3× (suspension)	Lanxess Arena, Cologne; Attendance: 19,250; Referees: Horvàth, Màrton (Hungary)

==== Final ====
29 May 2011; 18:00	FC Barcelona Borges (Spain)	27 – 24	(Spain) Ciudad Real	Lanxess Arena, Cologne; Attendance: 19,250; Referees: Lazaar, Reveret (France)
29 May 2011; 18:00	Nøddesbo 8	(14–10)	Jurkiewicz, Lazarov 5	Lanxess Arena, Cologne; Attendance: 19,250; Referees: Lazaar, Reveret (France)
29 May 2011; 18:00	2× (yellow card) 5× (suspension)	Report	4× (yellow card) 3× (suspension)	Lanxess Arena, Cologne; Attendance: 19,250; Referees: Lazaar, Reveret (France)

== Top scorers ==
Rank	Name	Team	Goals
1	(Germany) Uwe Gensheimer	(Germany) Rhein-Neckar Löwen	118
2	(Serbia) Marko Vujin	(Hungary) MKB Veszprém	98
3	(Denmark) Anders Eggert	(Germany) SG Flensburg-Handewitt	88
4	(Czech Republic) Filip Jicha	(Germany) THW Kiel	87
5	(France) William Accambray	(France) Montpellier HB	75
6	(Denmark) Lars Christiansen	(Denmark) KIF Kolding	74
6	(North Macedonia) Kiril Lazarov	(Spain) BM Ciudad Real	74
6	(Estonia) Mait Patrail	(Switzerland) Kadetten Schaffhausen	74
9	(Russia) Vasily Filippov	(Russia) Chekhovskiye Medvedi	67
10	(Russia) Pavel Atman	(Belarus) HC Dinamo-Minsk	63
10	(Sweden) Jonas Larholm	(Denmark) AaB Handball	63
