= Mateusz Zaremba =

Polish handball player (born 1984)

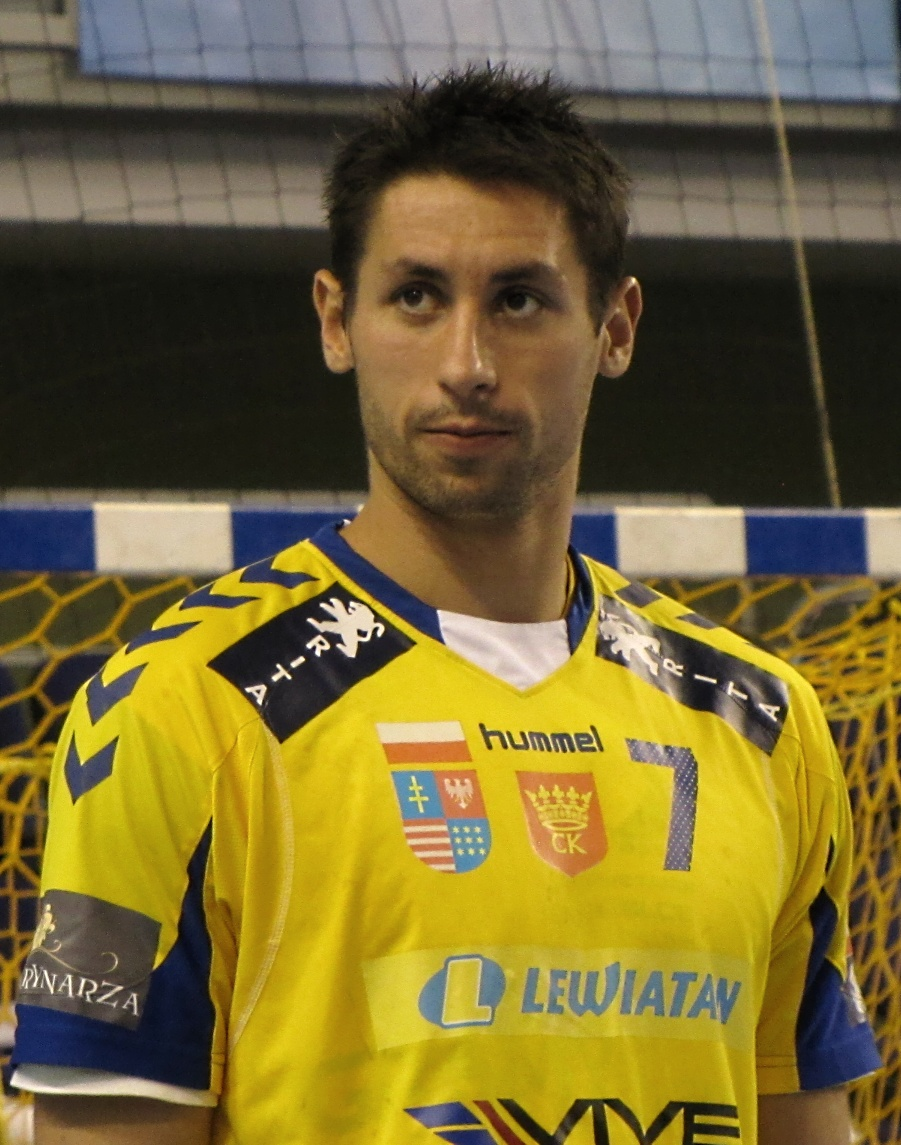

Personal information
- Full name: Mateusz Zaremba
- Nationality: Polish
- Born: 27 October 1984 (age 41) Nowogard, Poland
- Height: 1.98 m (6 ft 6 in)

Sport
- Sport: Handball
- Position: Right Back
- Current club: Pogoń Szczecin
- Number: 37

Senior clubs
- Years: Team
- 2000-2001: Pomorzanin Nowogard
- 2001-2007: HSV Insel Usedom
- 2007-2012: Vive Targi Kielce
- 2012–: Pogoń Szczecin
National team
Years	Team	Apps	(Gls)
2010–	Poland	28	(32)

Mateusz Zaremba (born 27 October 1984, in Nowogard) is a Polish handballer who plays for Pogoń Szczecin and the Polish national team.
