= Cédric Paty =

French handball player (born 1981)

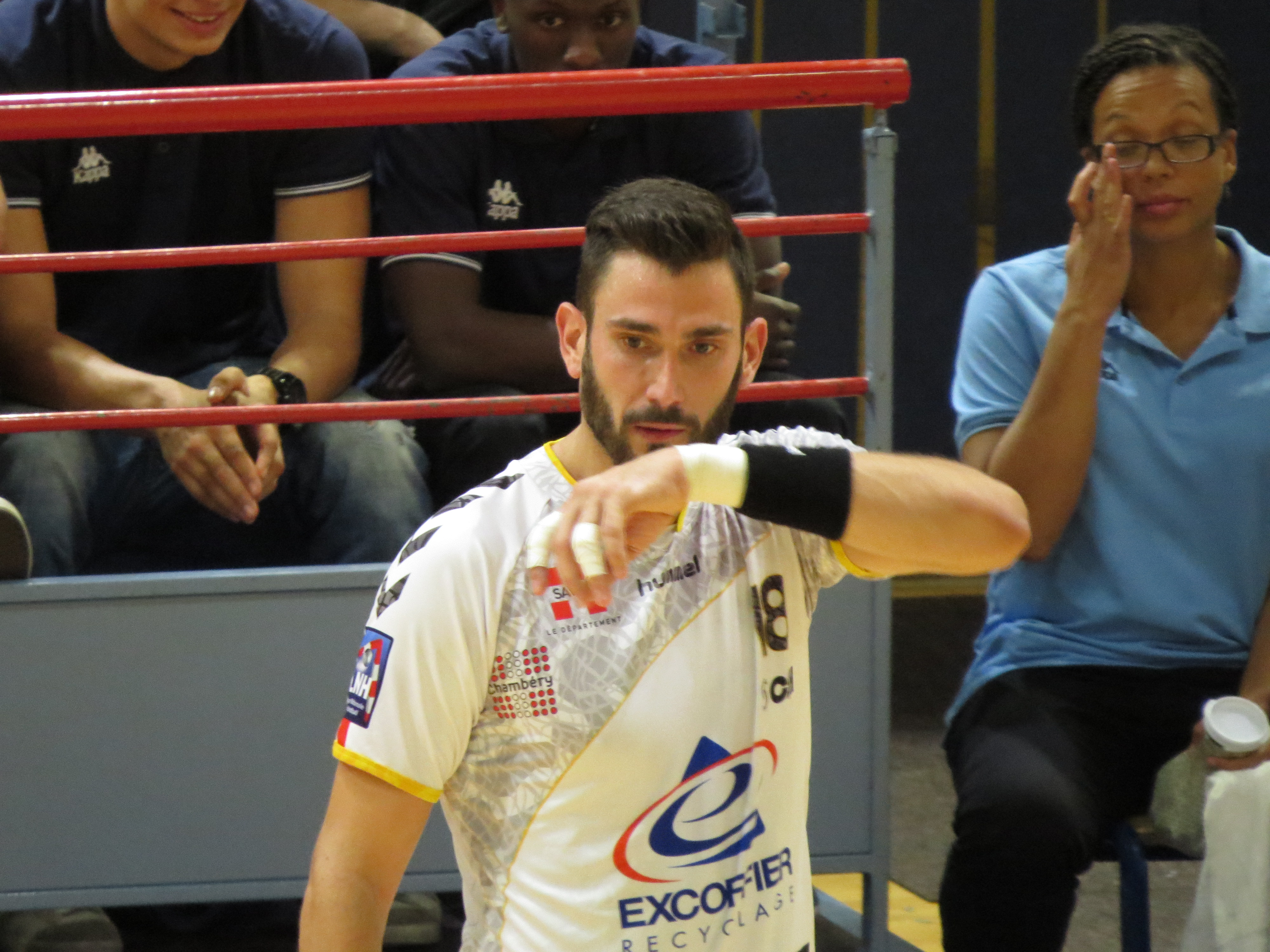
- Creteil - Chambery, LNH, October 22, 2014 Win 35-31 from Créteil 18 PATY Cedric

Personal information
- Nationality: French
- Born: 25 July 1981 (age 45) Châtillon-sur-Seine, France
- Height: 1.94 m (6 ft 4 in)

Sport
- Sport: Handball
- Position: Right back
- Current club: retired

Youth career
- Years: Team
- -2000: Châtillon-sur-Seine

Senior clubs
- Years: Team
- 2000-2002: Cercle Dijon Bourgogne Handball
- 2002-2003: ES Besançon
- 2003-2005: HBC Villefranche en Beaujolais
- 2005-2016: Chambéry Savoie Mont-Blanc Handball
National team
Years	Team	Apps	(Gls)
2008-2011	France	28	(63)
Medal record
Men's handball
Representing France
Summer Olympics
Gold medal – first place	2008 Beijing	Team competition
European Championships
Bronze medal – third place	2008 Norway

Cédric Paty (born 25 July 1981 in Châtillon-sur-Seine, Côte-d'Or) is a French handball player, who won a gold medal at the 2008 Summer Olympics.

Paty started playing handball because his father coached at the local handball club. In 2000 he joined the second tier team Cercle Dijon Bourgogne Handball, where he made his senior debut. After 2 years at Dijon he joined ES Besançon for a season, before he joined HBC Villefranche en Beaujolais. 2004/05 was his first season in the French top division. In 2005 he joined Chambéry Savoie Mont-Blanc Handball, where he played the rest of his career. He retired in after the 2015/16 season.
