= Vasily Filippov =

Russian handball player

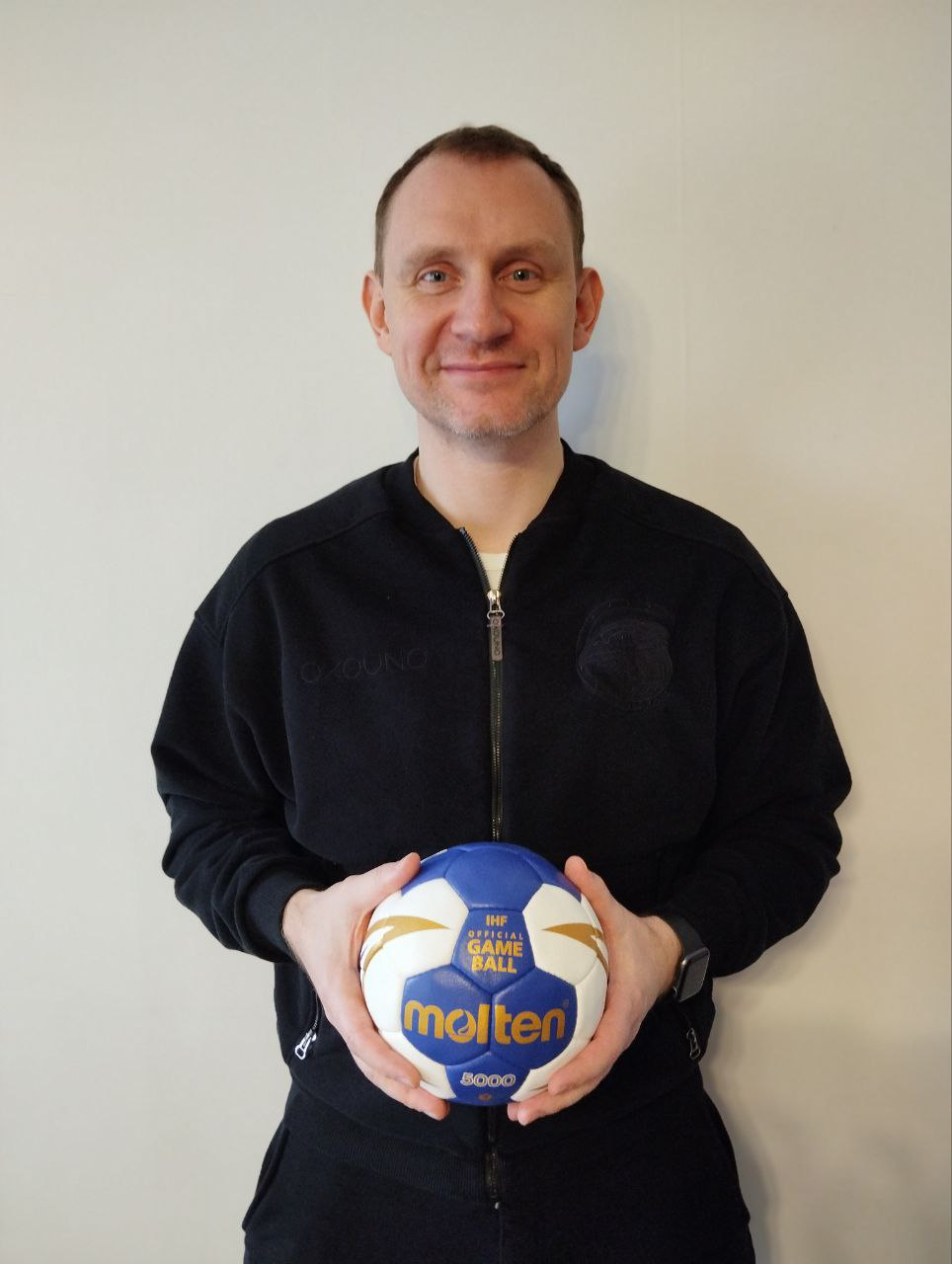
- Vasily Filippov (2024)

Personal information
- Full name: Vasily Viktorovich Filippov
- Nationality: Russian
- Born: 16 January 1981 (age 45) Moscow
- Height: 183 cm (72 in)

Sport
- Sport: Handball
- Position: Centre back
National team
- Years: Team
- 1998-2012: Russia

Vasily Viktorovich Filippov (Russian:Василий Викторович Филиппов, born 16 January 1981) is a Russian handball coach and former player. He was born in Moscow. He competed at the 2008 Summer Olympics in Beijing, where the Russian team placed sixth.

In 2017 he became the coach of HBC CSKA Moscow.

== Private life ==
He is married to the Russian former handballer Anna Kurepta.
