= Thomas Mogensen =

Danish handball player (born 1983)

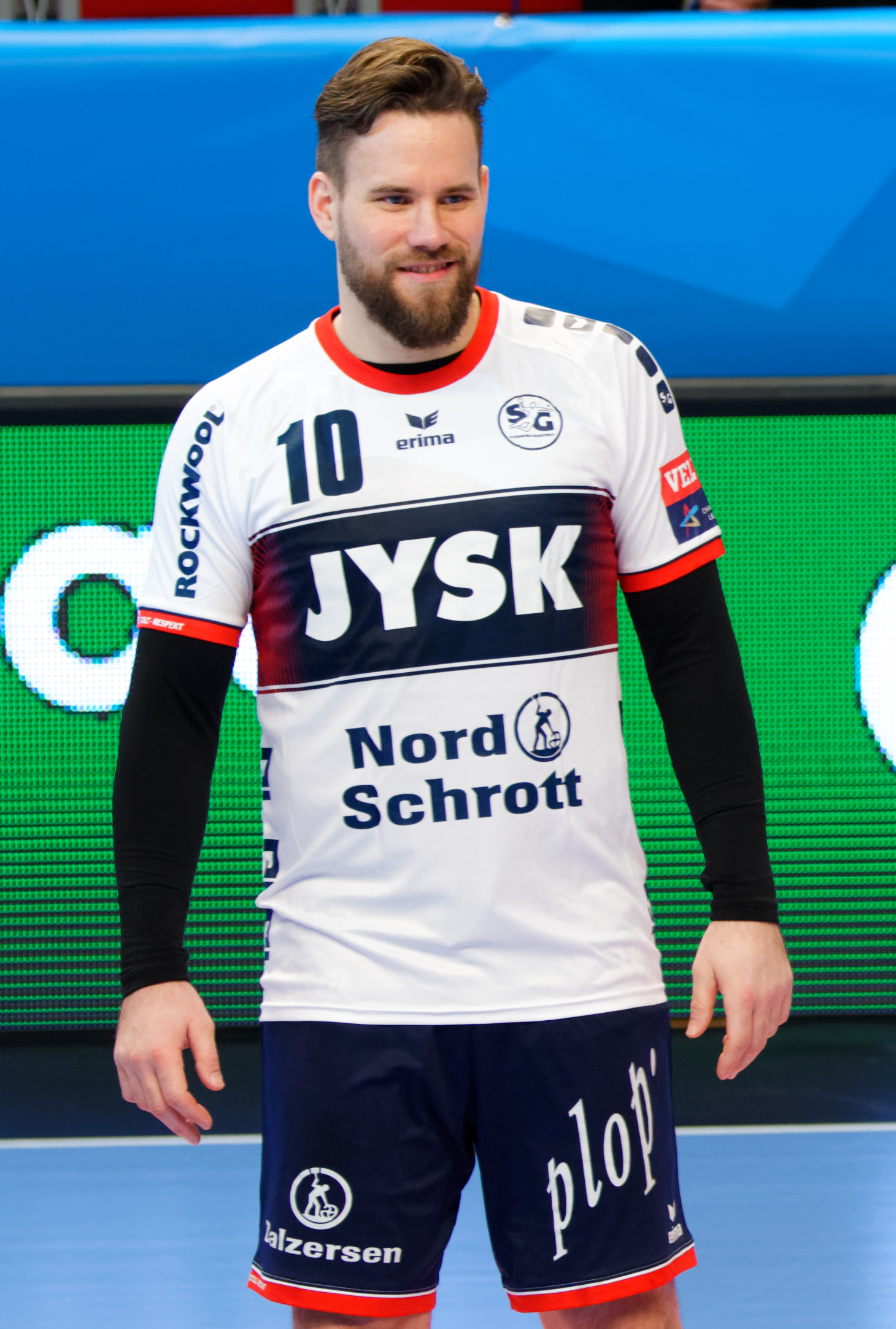
- Thomas Mogensen in 2018

Personal information
- Nationality: Danish
- Born: 30 January 1983 (age 43) Odder, Denmark
- Height: 1.87 m (6 ft 2 in)

Sport
- Sport: Handball
- Position: Central back
- Current club: SønderjyskE Håndbold
- Number: 2

Youth career
- Years: Team
- 1988-2000: Odder IGF

Senior clubs
- Years: Team
- 2000-2002: Odder IGF
- 2002-2003: Viborg HK
- 2003-2007: GOG
- 2007-2018: SG Flensburg-Handewitt
- 2018-2020: Skjern Håndbold
- 2020-2022: SønderjyskE Håndbold
National team
Years	Team	Apps	(Gls)
2003-2014	Denmark	106	(261)
Medal record
Men's Handball
Representing Denmark
World Championships
Silver medal – second place	2011 Sweden	Team
European Championship
Gold medal – first place	2012 Serbia	Team
Silver medal – second place	2014 Denmark	Team

Thomas Mogensen (born 30 January 1983) is a Danish team handball former player. He retired from handball in 2022 after playing for SønderjyskE Håndbold. He was Danish champion and selected as the best player in Denmark in 2007. Today he is the sporting director of his former club SønderjyskE Håndbold.

== Club play ==
Mogensen played for the Danish club GOG Svendborg TGI in the 2006/2007 season, when the club became Danish champions.

He retired from professional handball in 2022.

== Awards ==
Mogensen was voted Danish Player of the year 2007 in the Danish League (Selected by the players' committee)
