= Marcus Ahlm =

Swedish handballer (born 1978)

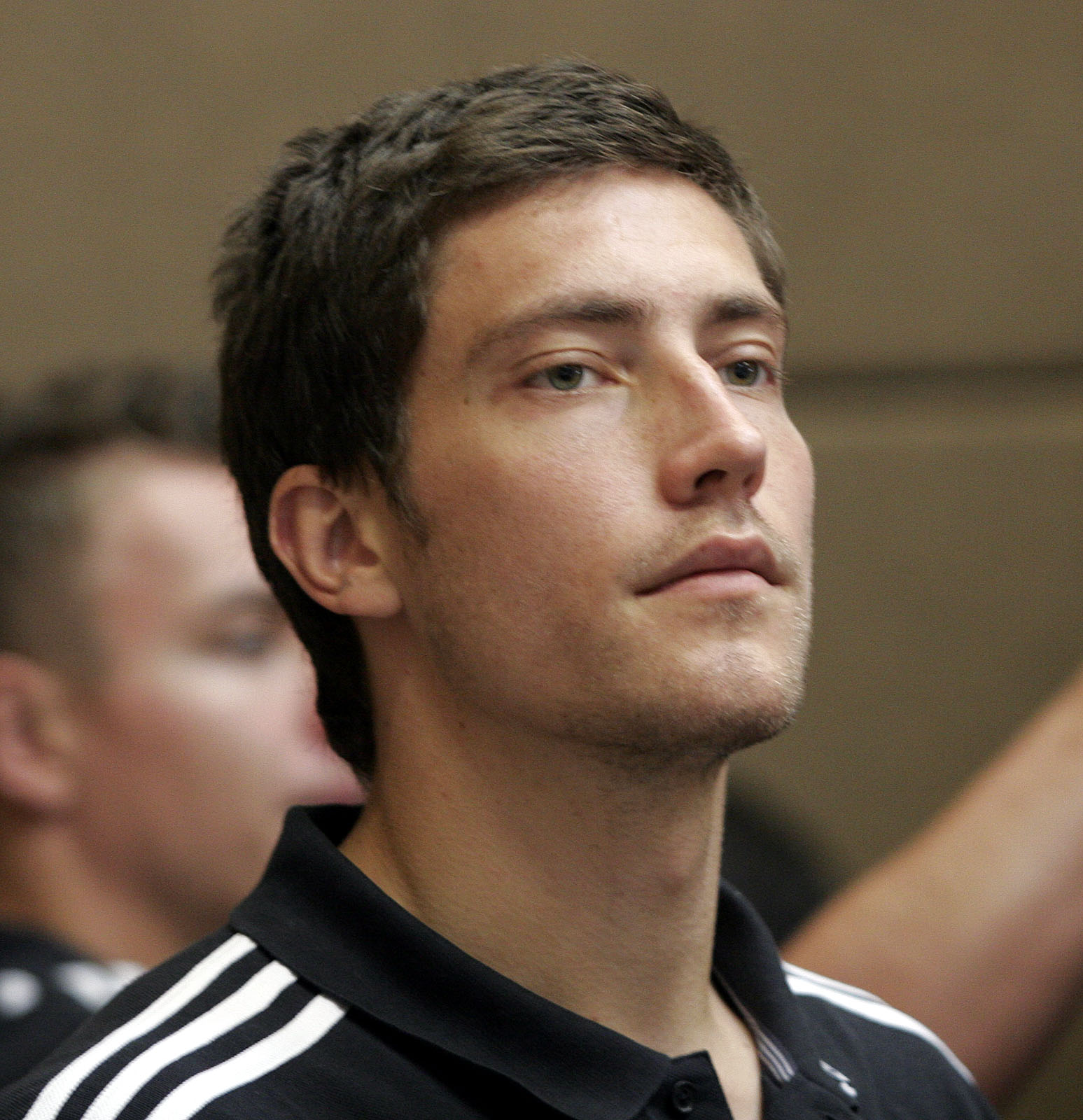

Personal information
- Nationality: Swedish
- Born: July 7, 1978 (age 48) Norra Åsum, Sweden
- Height: 200 cm (79 in)

Sport
- Sport: Handball
- Position: Pivot
- Current club: Retired

Senior clubs
- Years: Team
- –1990: Härlövs IF
- 1990–1999: IFK Kristianstad
- 1999–2000: Alingsås HK
- 2000–2003: IFK Ystad HK
- 2003–2013: THW Kiel
National team
Years	Team	Apps	(Gls)
2001–2008	Sweden	114	(367)
Medal record
European Championship
Gold medal – first place	2002 Sweden

Marcus Ahlm (born 7 July 1978) is a Swedish handballer. He retired from handball in 2013 after playing for German Handball-Bundesliga team THW Kiel.

== Career ==
In his youth, Marcus Ahlm played for the IFK Kristianstad Handball team and then later moved to IFK Ystad HK. In 2003 he transferred to the team THW Kiel and impressed enough to become one of their most important players in 2004/05. In that season he worked with Nikola Karabatic, a centre back who ranked among the best players in German handball. After the 2012/13 season Ahlm ended his career. He was considered one of the best circle runners in the world and was often compared to Magnus Wislander. In 2005 he was voted the Swedish Player of the Year. With THW Kiel, Ahlm won the German Championship eight times and the Champions League three times.

In 1999, Marcus Ahlm took part in the Junior World Championships, in which Sweden won silver. In 2001 he played for the Swedish national team for the first time. One year later he won the European Championship on home soil. For the World Qualifiers in 2005, Ahlm was intended to play as a circle runner, but an injury prevented him from participating in games against Turkey, Belgium and Belarus. Instead, he was replaced by Pelle Linders. He had 114 international caps and 367 goals scored in total by the end of his career.

At the end of his active career Alhm became a member of the board for THW Kiel.

== Private life ==
Marcus Ahlm studies chemistry, and is married with a son (Henry)and two daughters (Alice and ines).

== Achievements ==
- German Champions in 2005, 2006, 2007, 2008, 2009, 2010, 2012 and 2013 with THW Kiel
- DHB Cup winner in 2007, 2008, 2009, 2011, 2012 and 2013
- DHB-Supercup winner in 2005, 2007, 2008, 2011 and 2012
- 2nd place at the Scandinavian Open 2006
- Champions League winner in 2007, 2010 and 2012
- Super Globe Winner 2011
- EHF Champions Trophy 2007 winner
- EHF Winners Cup 2004
- European Champion 2002
- Silver at the 1999 Junior World Championships
- Sweden's Player of the Year in 2005
- National team Supercup winner in 2005

== Honours ==
- 3rd place in Handballwoche's "Player of the Year" vote in 2005.
- Handball magazine ranking: Council: 1. 2005 (WK), 3. 2004 (IK)
- In the Handballwoche team of the Season in 2003/2004, 2004/2005 und 2005/2006
- Schleswig-Holstein medal for sport 2011
- Swedish Player of the Year 2005

== Career in Bundesliga ==
Season	Team	League	Games	Goals	Seven-meter throws	Field goals
2003/04	THW Kiel	Bundesliga	34	159	0	159
2004/05	THW Kiel	Bundesliga	34	142	0	142
2005/06	THW Kiel	Bundesliga	34	174	1	173
2006/07	THW Kiel	Bundesliga	25	140	0	140
2007/08	THW Kiel	Bundesliga	34	151	0	151
2008/09	THW Kiel	Bundesliga	33	112	0	112
2009/10	THW Kiel	Bundesliga	32	79	0	79
2010/11	THW Kiel	Bundesliga	28	90	0	90
2011/12	THW Kiel	Bundesliga	32	105	0	105
2012/13	THW Kiel	Bundesliga	31	52	1	51
2003–2013	total	Bundesliga	317	1204	2	1202
