= Tomasz Rosiński =

Polish handball player (born 1984)

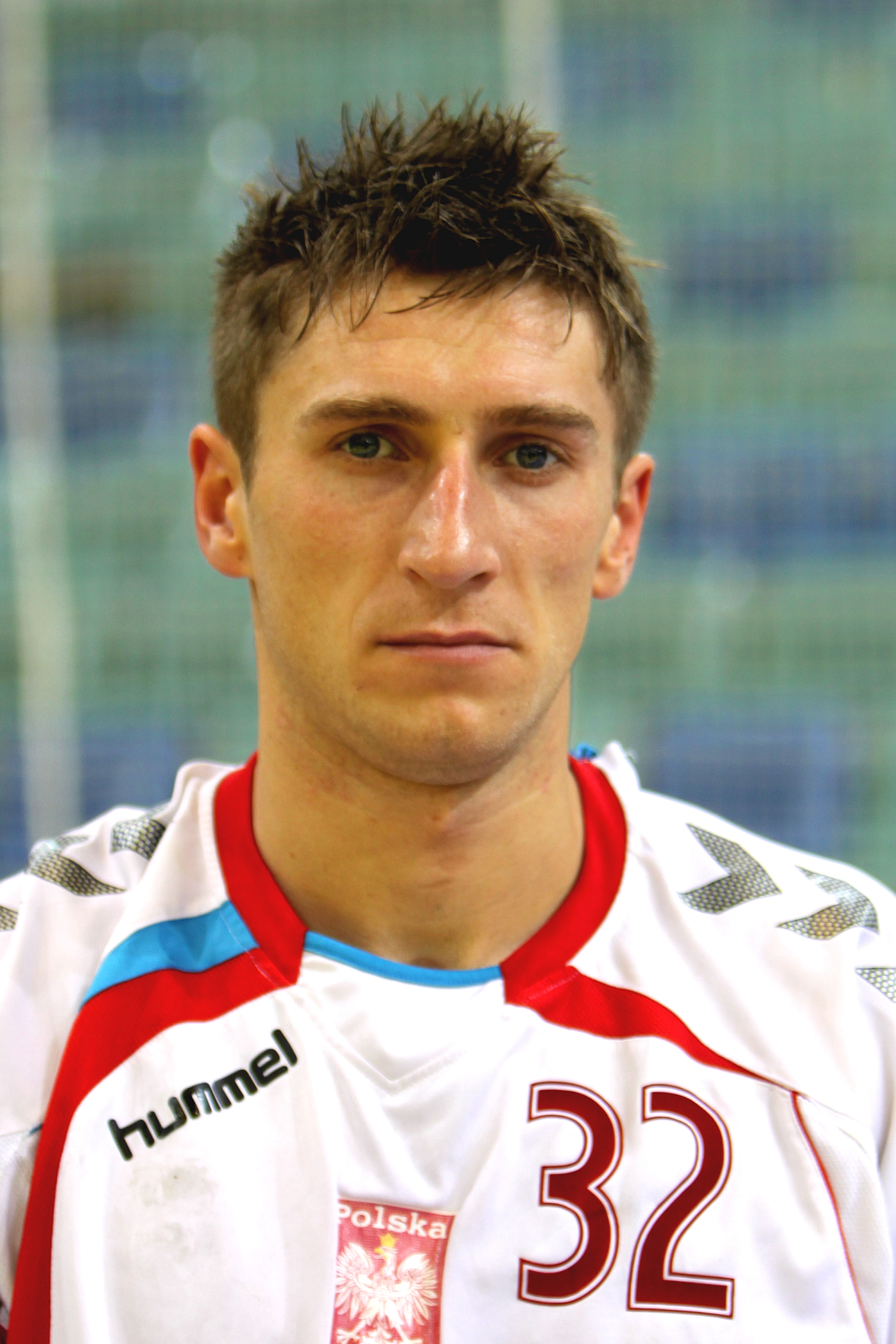

Personal information
- Nationality: Polish
- Born: 24 February 1984 (age 42) Ostrów Wielkopolski, Poland
- Height: 1.92 m (6 ft 4 in)

Sport
- Sport: Handball
- Position: Centre Back

Senior clubs
- Years: Team
- 1998–2003: NMC Górnik Zabrze
- 2003–2005: Śląsk Wrocław
- 2005–2015: Vive Kielce
- 2015–2016: SPR Chrobry Głogów
National team
Years	Team	Apps	(Gls)
2005–2013	Poland	45	(85)

Tomasz Rosiński (born 24 February 1984) is a former Polish handball player who played for the Polish national team.
