= 2011–12 EHF Champions League group stage =

The group stage of the 2011–12 EHF Champions League was held from 28 September 2011 till 26 February 2012. The top four teams advanced to the Round of last 16.

== Seedings ==
The draw for the group stage took place at the Gartenhotel Altmannsdorf in Vienna on 28 June 2011 at 11:00 local time. A total of 24 teams were drawn into four groups of six. Teams were divided into six pots, based on EHF coefficients. Clubs from the same pot or the same association could not be drawn into the same group, except the wild card tournament winner, which did not enjoy any protection.

Pot 1	Pot 2	Pot 3	Pot 4	Pot 5	Pot 6
(Spain) FC Barcelona Intersport (Germany) HSV Hamburg (Russia) Chekhovskiye Medvedi (France) Montpellier HB	(Hungary) MKB Veszprém KC (Croatia) RK Zagreb (Denmark) AG København (Slovenia) Koper	(Spain) BM Ciudad Real (Germany) THW Kiel (Romania) HCM Constanța (Switzerland) Kadetten Schaffhausen	(Russia) St. Petersburg HC (France) Chambéry Savoie HB (Spain) CB Ademar León (Germany) Füchse Berlin	(Hungary) SC Pick Szeged (Denmark) Bjerringbro-Silkeborg (Bosnia and Herzegovina) RK Bosna Sarajevo (Poland) Orlen Wisła Płock	(Serbia) RK Partizan (Sweden) IK Sävehof (North Macedonia) HC Metalurg (Poland) Vive Targi Kielce (WC)

== Group A ==
Pos	Team	Pld	W	D	L	GF	GA	GD	Pts	FCB	RKZ	IKS	SCH	CSH	RKS
1	(Spain) FC Barcelona Intersport	10	9	0	1	336	245	+91	18	—	29–30	36–24	33–29	28–25	37–19
2	(Croatia) RK Zagreb	10	8	0	2	289	255	+34	16	30–31	—	30–26	31–28	28–20	33–19
3	(Sweden) IK Sävehof	10	5	0	5	291	300	−9	10	26–39	28–25	—	31–25	32–31	24–20
4	(Switzerland) Kadetten Schaffhausen	10	4	0	6	309	283	+26	8	26–30	27–28	40–32	—	28–24	43–18
5	(France) Chambéry Savoie HB	10	4	0	6	276	270	+6	8	19–30	26–28	33–30	33–29	—	40–19
6	(Bosnia and Herzegovina) RK Bosna Sarajevo	10	0	0	10	195	343	−148	0	17–43	21–26	21–38	23–34	18–25	—

29 September 2011; 18:00	RK Zagreb (Croatia)	30 – 26	(Sweden) IK Sävehof	Arena Zagreb, Zagreb; Attendance: 3,000; Referees: Horváth, Marton (HUN)
29 September 2011; 18:00	Horvat 8	(16–12)	Fridén 6	Arena Zagreb, Zagreb; Attendance: 3,000; Referees: Horváth, Marton (HUN)
29 September 2011; 18:00	3× (yellow card) 4× (suspension)	Report	3× (yellow card) 2× (suspension)	Arena Zagreb, Zagreb; Attendance: 3,000; Referees: Horváth, Marton (HUN)

1 October 2011; 16:15	FC Barcelona Intersport (Spain)	28 – 25	(France) Chambéry Savoie HB	Palau Blaugrana, Barcelona; Attendance: 1,300; Referees: Geipel, Helbig (GER)
1 October 2011; 16:15	Nagy 6	(13–16)	Bićanić 8	Palau Blaugrana, Barcelona; Attendance: 1,300; Referees: Geipel, Helbig (GER)
1 October 2011; 16:15	3× (yellow card) 3× (suspension)	Report	3× (yellow card) 5× (suspension)	Palau Blaugrana, Barcelona; Attendance: 1,300; Referees: Geipel, Helbig (GER)

1 October 2011; 19:00	RK Bosna Sarajevo (Bosnia and Herzegovina)	23 – 34	(Switzerland) Kadetten Schaffhausen	Dvorana Mirza Delibašić, Sarajevo; Attendance: 1,000; Referees: Dinu, Din (ROU)
1 October 2011; 19:00	Čakić 5	(14–14)	Ursic 8	Dvorana Mirza Delibašić, Sarajevo; Attendance: 1,000; Referees: Dinu, Din (ROU)
1 October 2011; 19:00	3× (yellow card) 3× (suspension)	Report	3× (yellow card) 2× (suspension)	Dvorana Mirza Delibašić, Sarajevo; Attendance: 1,000; Referees: Dinu, Din (ROU)

6 October 2011; 20:00	Kadetten Schaffhausen (Switzerland)	26 – 30	(Spain) FC Barcelona Intersport	Schweizersbildhalle, Schaffhausen; Attendance: 3,100; Referees: Gjeding, Hansen (DEN)
6 October 2011; 20:00	Starczan 9	(13–14)	three players 4	Schweizersbildhalle, Schaffhausen; Attendance: 3,100; Referees: Gjeding, Hansen (DEN)
6 October 2011; 20:00	3× (yellow card)	Report	2× (yellow card) 1× (suspension)	Schweizersbildhalle, Schaffhausen; Attendance: 3,100; Referees: Gjeding, Hansen (DEN)

8 October 2011; 20:15	RK Zagreb (Croatia)	33 – 19	(Bosnia and Herzegovina) RK Bosna Sarajevo	Arena Zagreb, Zagreb; Attendance: 7,000; Referees: Nikolic, Stojkovic (SRB)
8 October 2011; 20:15	Horvat 7	(16–9)	Čakić, Vražalić 5	Arena Zagreb, Zagreb; Attendance: 7,000; Referees: Nikolic, Stojkovic (SRB)
8 October 2011; 20:15	3× (yellow card) 3× (suspension)	Report	3× (yellow card) 2× (suspension)	Arena Zagreb, Zagreb; Attendance: 7,000; Referees: Nikolic, Stojkovic (SRB)

9 October 2011; 17:00	Chambéry Savoie HB (France)	33 – 30	(Sweden) IK Sävehof	Le Phare, Chambéry; Attendance: 3,500; Referees: Zotin, Volodkov (RUS)
9 October 2011; 17:00	Bićanić 10	(17–17)	Berggren 7	Le Phare, Chambéry; Attendance: 3,500; Referees: Zotin, Volodkov (RUS)
9 October 2011; 17:00	3× (yellow card) 2× (suspension) 1× (red card)	Report	3× (yellow card) 2× (suspension) 1× (red card)	Le Phare, Chambéry; Attendance: 3,500; Referees: Zotin, Volodkov (RUS)

13 October 2011; 20:00	Kadetten Schaffhausen (Switzerland)	27 – 28	(Croatia) RK Zagreb	Schweizersbildhalle, Schaffhausen; Attendance: 3,100; Referees: Brunovsky, Canda (SVK)
13 October 2011; 20:00	Graubner, Ursic 8	(14–14)	Kopljar 9	Schweizersbildhalle, Schaffhausen; Attendance: 3,100; Referees: Brunovsky, Canda (SVK)
13 October 2011; 20:00	2× (yellow card) 3× (suspension)	Report	3× (yellow card) 3× (suspension)	Schweizersbildhalle, Schaffhausen; Attendance: 3,100; Referees: Brunovsky, Canda (SVK)

15 October 2011; 16:15	FC Barcelona Intersport (Spain)	36 – 24	(Sweden) IK Sävehof	Palau Blaugrana, Barcelona; Attendance: 1,800; Referees: Opava, Valek (CZE)
15 October 2011; 16:15	Aguirrezabalaga Garcia 7	(17–12)	Fridén, Larsson 5	Palau Blaugrana, Barcelona; Attendance: 1,800; Referees: Opava, Valek (CZE)
15 October 2011; 16:15	3× (yellow card) 3× (suspension)	Report	3× (yellow card) 1× (suspension)	Palau Blaugrana, Barcelona; Attendance: 1,800; Referees: Opava, Valek (CZE)

15 October 2011; 19:00	RK Bosna Sarajevo (Bosnia and Herzegovina)	18 – 25	(France) Chambéry Savoie HB	Dvorana Mirza Delibašić, Sarajevo; Attendance: 1,000; Referees: Stenrand, Birch (DEN)
15 October 2011; 19:00	Karačić 5	(9–14)	Paty 6	Dvorana Mirza Delibašić, Sarajevo; Attendance: 1,000; Referees: Stenrand, Birch (DEN)
15 October 2011; 19:00	3× (yellow card) 5× (suspension)	Report	3× (yellow card) 3× (suspension)	Dvorana Mirza Delibašić, Sarajevo; Attendance: 1,000; Referees: Stenrand, Birch (DEN)

20 October 2011; 19:10	IK Sävehof (Sweden)	24 – 20	(Bosnia and Herzegovina) RK Bosna Sarajevo	Scandinavium, Gothenburg; Attendance: 2,150; Referees: Covalciuc, Covalciuc (MDA)
20 October 2011; 19:10	Schefvert 6	(13–11)	Čakić 5	Scandinavium, Gothenburg; Attendance: 2,150; Referees: Covalciuc, Covalciuc (MDA)
20 October 2011; 19:10	2× (yellow card) 3× (suspension)	Report	3× (yellow card) 3× (suspension)	Scandinavium, Gothenburg; Attendance: 2,150; Referees: Covalciuc, Covalciuc (MDA)

22 October 2011; 20:15	RK Zagreb (Croatia)	30 – 31	(Spain) FC Barcelona Intersport	Arena Zagreb, Zagreb; Attendance: 13,000; Referees: Methe, Methe (GER)
22 October 2011; 20:15	Horvat 10	(14–13)	Rutenka 7	Arena Zagreb, Zagreb; Attendance: 13,000; Referees: Methe, Methe (GER)
22 October 2011; 20:15	3× (yellow card) 4× (suspension)	Report	3× (yellow card) 2× (suspension)	Arena Zagreb, Zagreb; Attendance: 13,000; Referees: Methe, Methe (GER)

22 October 2011; 20:30	Chambéry Savoie HB (France)	33 – 29	(Switzerland) Kadetten Schaffhausen	Le Phare, Chambéry; Attendance: 3,800; Referees: Kekes, Kekes (HUN)
22 October 2011; 20:30	Bićanić 7	(18–16)	Starczan 6	Le Phare, Chambéry; Attendance: 3,800; Referees: Kekes, Kekes (HUN)
22 October 2011; 20:30	2× (yellow card) 6× (suspension)	Report	3× (yellow card) 7× (suspension)	Le Phare, Chambéry; Attendance: 3,800; Referees: Kekes, Kekes (HUN)

17 November 2011; 19:10	IK Sävehof (Sweden)	31 – 25	(Switzerland) Kadetten Schaffhausen	Partillebohallen, Partille; Attendance: 2,300; Referees: Geipel, Helbig (GER)
17 November 2011; 19:10	Fridén 8	(14–14)	Graubner 6	Partillebohallen, Partille; Attendance: 2,300; Referees: Geipel, Helbig (GER)
17 November 2011; 19:10	2× (yellow card) 4× (suspension)	Report	3× (yellow card) 2× (suspension)	Partillebohallen, Partille; Attendance: 2,300; Referees: Geipel, Helbig (GER)

19 November 2011; 19:00	RK Bosna Sarajevo (Bosnia and Herzegovina)	17 – 43	(Spain) FC Barcelona Intersport	Dvorana Mirza Delibašić, Sarajevo; Attendance: 4,250; Referees: Bonifert, Oláh (HUN)
19 November 2011; 19:00	Medić 7	(9–21)	Aguirrezabalaga 6	Dvorana Mirza Delibašić, Sarajevo; Attendance: 4,250; Referees: Bonifert, Oláh (HUN)
19 November 2011; 19:00	3× (yellow card) 6× (suspension)	Report	3× (yellow card) 2× (suspension)	Dvorana Mirza Delibašić, Sarajevo; Attendance: 4,250; Referees: Bonifert, Oláh (HUN)

20 November 2011; 17:00	Chambéry Savoie HB (France)	26 – 28	(Croatia) RK Zagreb	Le Phare, Chambéry; Attendance: 4,400; Referees: Gjeding, Hansen (DEN)
20 November 2011; 17:00	Bašić, Bićanić 5	(14–14)	Špiler 7	Le Phare, Chambéry; Attendance: 4,400; Referees: Gjeding, Hansen (DEN)
20 November 2011; 17:00	3× (yellow card)	Report	3× (yellow card) 2× (suspension)	Le Phare, Chambéry; Attendance: 4,400; Referees: Gjeding, Hansen (DEN)

24 November 2011; 20:30	Kadetten Schaffhausen (Switzerland)	40 – 32	(Sweden) IK Sävehof	Schweizersbildhalle, Schaffhausen; Attendance: 2,100; Referees: Nikolic, Stojkovic (SRB)
24 November 2011; 20:30	Graubner 11	(20–14)	Berggren 8	Schweizersbildhalle, Schaffhausen; Attendance: 2,100; Referees: Nikolic, Stojkovic (SRB)
24 November 2011; 20:30	3× (yellow card) 4× (suspension)	Report	3× (yellow card) 4× (suspension)	Schweizersbildhalle, Schaffhausen; Attendance: 2,100; Referees: Nikolic, Stojkovic (SRB)

26 November 2011; 16:15	FC Barcelona Intersport (Spain)	37 – 19	(Bosnia and Herzegovina) RK Bosna Sarajevo	Palau Blaugrana, Barcelona; Attendance: 1,300; Referees: Pavicevic, Raznatovic (MNE)
26 November 2011; 16:15	García 5	(20–10)	Medić, Vražalić 5	Palau Blaugrana, Barcelona; Attendance: 1,300; Referees: Pavicevic, Raznatovic (MNE)
26 November 2011; 16:15	4× (yellow card) 2× (suspension)	Report	3× (yellow card) 3× (suspension) 1× (red card)	Palau Blaugrana, Barcelona; Attendance: 1,300; Referees: Pavicevic, Raznatovic (MNE)

26 November 2011; 20:15	RK Zagreb (Croatia)	28 – 20	(France) Chambéry Savoie HB	Arena Zagreb, Zagreb; Attendance: 8,000; Referees: Abrahamsen, Kristiansen (NOR)
26 November 2011; 20:15	Horvat 6	(14–7)	Bašić 5	Arena Zagreb, Zagreb; Attendance: 8,000; Referees: Abrahamsen, Kristiansen (NOR)
26 November 2011; 20:15	3× (yellow card) 5× (suspension)	Report	1× (yellow card) 3× (suspension)	Arena Zagreb, Zagreb; Attendance: 8,000; Referees: Abrahamsen, Kristiansen (NOR)

3 December 2011; 16:15	FC Barcelona Intersport (Spain)	33 – 29	(Switzerland) Kadetten Schaffhausen	Palau Blaugrana, Barcelona; Attendance: 1,450; Referees: Fleisch, Rieber (GER)
3 December 2011; 16:15	Ugalde 6	(18–15)	Kukucka 6	Palau Blaugrana, Barcelona; Attendance: 1,450; Referees: Fleisch, Rieber (GER)
3 December 2011; 16:15	3× (yellow card) 4× (suspension)	Report	3× (yellow card) 1× (suspension)	Palau Blaugrana, Barcelona; Attendance: 1,450; Referees: Fleisch, Rieber (GER)

3 December 2011; 19:00	RK Bosna Sarajevo (Bosnia and Herzegovina)	21 – 26	(Croatia) RK Zagreb	Dvorana Mirza Delibašić, Sarajevo; Attendance: 2,000; Referees: Zotin, Volodkov (RUS)
3 December 2011; 19:00	Medić 6	(11–14)	Horvat 9	Dvorana Mirza Delibašić, Sarajevo; Attendance: 2,000; Referees: Zotin, Volodkov (RUS)
3 December 2011; 19:00	2× (yellow card) 2× (suspension)	Report	3× (yellow card) 4× (suspension)	Dvorana Mirza Delibašić, Sarajevo; Attendance: 2,000; Referees: Zotin, Volodkov (RUS)

4 December 2011; 15:10	IK Sävehof (Sweden)	32 – 31	(France) Chambéry Savoie HB	Partillebohallen, Partille; Attendance: 2,200; Referees: Olesen, Pedersen (DEN)
4 December 2011; 15:10	Apelgren, Berggren 7	(17–18)	Bašić 7	Partillebohallen, Partille; Attendance: 2,200; Referees: Olesen, Pedersen (DEN)
4 December 2011; 15:10	2× (yellow card) 4× (suspension)	Report	3× (yellow card) 5× (suspension)	Partillebohallen, Partille; Attendance: 2,200; Referees: Olesen, Pedersen (DEN)

9 February 2012; 20:00	Kadetten Schaffhausen (Switzerland)	43 – 18	(Bosnia and Herzegovina) RK Bosna Sarajevo	Schweizersbildhalle, Schaffhausen; Attendance: 1,600; Referees: Kouz, Zhoba (UKR)
9 February 2012; 20:00	Pendić 8	(23–8)	Kasumović 3	Schweizersbildhalle, Schaffhausen; Attendance: 1,600; Referees: Kouz, Zhoba (UKR)
9 February 2012; 20:00	3× (yellow card) 5× (suspension)	Report	3× (yellow card) 5× (suspension)	Schweizersbildhalle, Schaffhausen; Attendance: 1,600; Referees: Kouz, Zhoba (UKR)

12 February 2012; 17:00	Chambéry Savoie HB (France)	19 – 30	(Spain) FC Barcelona Intersport	Le Phare, Chambéry; Attendance: 4,400; Referees: Opava, Valek (CZE)
12 February 2012; 17:00	Paty 4	(10–15)	Nagy, Rocas 7	Le Phare, Chambéry; Attendance: 4,400; Referees: Opava, Valek (CZE)
12 February 2012; 17:00	3× (yellow card) 2× (suspension)	Report	3× (yellow card) 4× (suspension)	Le Phare, Chambéry; Attendance: 4,400; Referees: Opava, Valek (CZE)

12 February 2012; 18:10	IK Sävehof (Sweden)	28 – 25	(Croatia) RK Zagreb	Partillebohallen, Partille; Attendance: 3,200; Referees: Dinu, Din (ROU)
12 February 2012; 18:10	Larsson 13	(12–10)	Horvat 7	Partillebohallen, Partille; Attendance: 3,200; Referees: Dinu, Din (ROU)
12 February 2012; 18:10	3× (yellow card) 3× (suspension)	Report	2× (yellow card) 6× (suspension)	Partillebohallen, Partille; Attendance: 3,200; Referees: Dinu, Din (ROU)

16 February 2012; 20:00	Kadetten Schaffhausen (Switzerland)	28 – 24	(France) Chambéry Savoie HB	Schweizersbildhalle, Schaffhausen; Attendance: 2,400; Referees: Leifsson, Palsson (ISL)
16 February 2012; 20:00	Stojanović 8	(15–12)	Marroux 5	Schweizersbildhalle, Schaffhausen; Attendance: 2,400; Referees: Leifsson, Palsson (ISL)
16 February 2012; 20:00	3× (yellow card) 4× (suspension) 1× (red card)	Report	3× (yellow card) 4× (suspension)	Schweizersbildhalle, Schaffhausen; Attendance: 2,400; Referees: Leifsson, Palsson (ISL)

18 February 2012; 16:15	FC Barcelona Intersport (Spain)	29 – 30	(Croatia) RK Zagreb	Palau Blaugrana, Barcelona; Attendance: 2,600; Referees: Buy, Pichon (FRA)
18 February 2012; 16:15	Rutenka 8	(14–15)	Kopljar 7	Palau Blaugrana, Barcelona; Attendance: 2,600; Referees: Buy, Pichon (FRA)
18 February 2012; 16:15	2× (yellow card)	Report	3× (yellow card) 6× (suspension)	Palau Blaugrana, Barcelona; Attendance: 2,600; Referees: Buy, Pichon (FRA)

18 February 2012; 19:00	RK Bosna Sarajevo (Bosnia and Herzegovina)	21 – 38	(Sweden) IK Sävehof	Dvorana Mirza Delibašić, Sarajevo; Attendance: 1,000; Referees: Erdogan, Özdeniz (TUR)
18 February 2012; 19:00	Terza 5	(8–19)	Fridén 7	Dvorana Mirza Delibašić, Sarajevo; Attendance: 1,000; Referees: Erdogan, Özdeniz (TUR)
18 February 2012; 19:00	3× (yellow card) 6× (suspension)	Report	3× (yellow card) 2× (suspension)	Dvorana Mirza Delibašić, Sarajevo; Attendance: 1,000; Referees: Erdogan, Özdeniz (TUR)

25 February 2012; 20:30	RK Zagreb (Croatia)	31 – 28	(Switzerland) Kadetten Schaffhausen	Arena Zagreb, Zagreb; Attendance: 5,000; Referees: Cohen, Peretz (ISR)
25 February 2012; 20:30	Horvat 8	(16–14)	Stojanović 6	Arena Zagreb, Zagreb; Attendance: 5,000; Referees: Cohen, Peretz (ISR)
25 February 2012; 20:30	3× (yellow card) 4× (suspension)	Report	3× (yellow card) 1× (suspension)	Arena Zagreb, Zagreb; Attendance: 5,000; Referees: Cohen, Peretz (ISR)

25 February 2012; 20:30	Chambéry Savoie HB (France)	40 – 19	(Bosnia and Herzegovina) RK Bosna Sarajevo	Le Phare, Chambéry; Attendance: 4,400; Referees: Andorka, Hucker (HUN)
25 February 2012; 20:30	Bićanić, Marroux 8	(20–11)	Alibegović, Zulfić 5	Le Phare, Chambéry; Attendance: 4,400; Referees: Andorka, Hucker (HUN)
25 February 2012; 20:30	1× (yellow card) 2× (suspension)	Report	3× (yellow card) 3× (suspension) 1× (red card)	Le Phare, Chambéry; Attendance: 4,400; Referees: Andorka, Hucker (HUN)

26 February 2012; 16:10	IK Sävehof (Sweden)	26 – 39	(Spain) FC Barcelona Intersport	Partillebohallen, Partille; Attendance: 4,150; Referees: Gousko, Repkin (BLR)
26 February 2012; 16:10	Larsson 8	(11–19)	Nøddesbo 9	Partillebohallen, Partille; Attendance: 4,150; Referees: Gousko, Repkin (BLR)
26 February 2012; 16:10	3× (yellow card) 2× (suspension)	Report	3× (yellow card) 1× (suspension)	Partillebohallen, Partille; Attendance: 4,150; Referees: Gousko, Repkin (BLR)

== Group B ==
Pos	Team	Pld	W	D	L	GF	GA	GD	Pts	BMN	MKB	VTK	FÜB	CHM	BJS
1	(Spain) Atlético Madrid	10	7	2	1	318	285	+33	16	—	37–28	28–27	32–27	30–30	31–27
2	(Hungary) MKB Veszprém KC	10	6	0	4	266	266	0	12	28–27	—	21–24	24–33	24–22	32–25
3	(Poland) Vive Targi Kielce	10	5	1	4	295	285	+10	11	29–37	25–29	—	32–29	26–26	37–29
4	(Germany) Füchse Berlin	10	5	1	4	296	292	+4	11	33–37	24–29	30–27	—	31–28	28–27
5	(Russia) Chekhovskiye Medvedi	10	3	4	3	291	276	+15	10	29–29	30–26	30–31	31–31	—	30–23
6	(Denmark) Bjerringbro-Silkeborg	10	0	0	10	253	315	−62	0	27–30	19–25	26–37	25–30	25–35	—

2 October 2011; 15:00	Vive Targi Kielce (Poland)	25 – 29	(Hungary) MKB Veszprém KC	Hala Legionów, Kielce; Attendance: 4,000; Referees: Nikolov, Nachevski (MKD)
2 October 2011; 15:00	Stojković 9	(10–17)	Vujin 6	Hala Legionów, Kielce; Attendance: 4,000; Referees: Nikolov, Nachevski (MKD)
2 October 2011; 15:00	3× (yellow card) 3× (suspension)	Report	3× (yellow card) 5× (suspension)	Hala Legionów, Kielce; Attendance: 4,000; Referees: Nikolov, Nachevski (MKD)

2 October 2011; 16:50	Bjerringbro-Silkeborg (Denmark)	27 – 30	(Spain) Atlético Madrid	Silkeborg-Hallerne, Silkeborg; Attendance: 10,300; Referees: Krstic, Ljubic (SVN)
2 October 2011; 16:50	Nielsen 6	(16–15)	Aguinagalde Akuizu 9	Silkeborg-Hallerne, Silkeborg; Attendance: 10,300; Referees: Krstic, Ljubic (SVN)
2 October 2011; 16:50	3× (yellow card) 4× (suspension)	Report	3× (yellow card) 3× (suspension)	Silkeborg-Hallerne, Silkeborg; Attendance: 10,300; Referees: Krstic, Ljubic (SVN)

2 October 2011; 18:45	Chekhovskiye Medvedi (Russia)	31 – 31	(Germany) Füchse Berlin	Olimpiysky Sport Palace, Chekhov; Attendance: 2,000; Referees: Brunovsky, Canda (SVK)
2 October 2011; 18:45	Dibirov 6	(15–18)	Christophersen 9	Olimpiysky Sport Palace, Chekhov; Attendance: 2,000; Referees: Brunovsky, Canda (SVK)
2 October 2011; 18:45	3× (yellow card) 2× (suspension)	Report	3× (yellow card) 1× (suspension)	Olimpiysky Sport Palace, Chekhov; Attendance: 2,000; Referees: Brunovsky, Canda (SVK)

8 October 2011; 18:15	MKB Veszprém KC (Hungary)	32 – 25	(Denmark) Bjerringbro-Silkeborg	Veszprém Aréna, Veszprém; Attendance: 5,000; Referees: Jurinovic, Mrvica (CRO)
8 October 2011; 18:15	Vujin 8	(17–11)	Petersen 6	Veszprém Aréna, Veszprém; Attendance: 5,000; Referees: Jurinovic, Mrvica (CRO)
8 October 2011; 18:15	3× (yellow card) 1× (suspension)	Report	3× (yellow card) 1× (suspension)	Veszprém Aréna, Veszprém; Attendance: 5,000; Referees: Jurinovic, Mrvica (CRO)

9 October 2011; 17:30	Füchse Berlin (Germany)	30 – 27	(Poland) Vive Targi Kielce	Max-Schmeling-Halle, Berlin; Attendance: 7,900; Referees: Lazaar, Reveret (FRA)
9 October 2011; 17:30	Laen 7	(14–15)	Tkaczyk 5	Max-Schmeling-Halle, Berlin; Attendance: 7,900; Referees: Lazaar, Reveret (FRA)
9 October 2011; 17:30	3× (yellow card) 1× (suspension)	Report	3× (yellow card) 7× (suspension)	Max-Schmeling-Halle, Berlin; Attendance: 7,900; Referees: Lazaar, Reveret (FRA)

9 October 2011; 20:15	Atlético Madrid (Spain)	30 – 30	(Russia) Chekhovskiye Medvedi	Palacio Vistalegre, Madrid; Attendance: 4,500; Referees: Leifsson, Palsson (ISL)
9 October 2011; 20:15	Lazarov 7	(18–14)	Filippov 6	Palacio Vistalegre, Madrid; Attendance: 4,500; Referees: Leifsson, Palsson (ISL)
9 October 2011; 20:15	3× (yellow card) 3× (suspension) 1× (red card)	Report	3× (yellow card) 3× (suspension) 1× (red card)	Palacio Vistalegre, Madrid; Attendance: 4,500; Referees: Leifsson, Palsson (ISL)

13 October 2011; 19:00	Chekhovskiye Medvedi (Russia)	30 – 31	(Poland) Vive Targi Kielce	Olimpiysky Sport Palace, Chekhov; Attendance: 2,300; Referees: Nikolic, Stojkovic (SRB)
13 October 2011; 19:00	Shelmenko 8	(17–17)	Jurecki 9	Olimpiysky Sport Palace, Chekhov; Attendance: 2,300; Referees: Nikolic, Stojkovic (SRB)
13 October 2011; 19:00	2× (yellow card) 5× (suspension)	Report	3× (yellow card) 4× (suspension)	Olimpiysky Sport Palace, Chekhov; Attendance: 2,300; Referees: Nikolic, Stojkovic (SRB)

15 October 2011; 20:15	Atlético Madrid (Spain)	37 – 28	(Hungary) MKB Veszprém KC	Palacio Vistalegre, Madrid; Attendance: 4,850; Referees: Leifsson, Palsson (ISL)
15 October 2011; 20:15	Lazarov 7	(17–15)	Vujin 7	Palacio Vistalegre, Madrid; Attendance: 4,850; Referees: Leifsson, Palsson (ISL)
15 October 2011; 20:15	3× (yellow card) 3× (suspension)	Report	3× (yellow card) 5× (suspension)	Palacio Vistalegre, Madrid; Attendance: 4,850; Referees: Leifsson, Palsson (ISL)

16 October 2011; 15:00	Bjerringbro-Silkeborg (Denmark)	25 – 30	(Germany) Füchse Berlin	Silkeborg-Hallerne, Silkeborg; Attendance: 2,000; Referees: Abrahamsen, Kristiansen (NOR)
16 October 2011; 15:00	Kirkegaard 6	(14–14)	Laen 8	Silkeborg-Hallerne, Silkeborg; Attendance: 2,000; Referees: Abrahamsen, Kristiansen (NOR)
16 October 2011; 15:00	3× (yellow card) 2× (suspension)	Report	2× (yellow card) 5× (suspension)	Silkeborg-Hallerne, Silkeborg; Attendance: 2,000; Referees: Abrahamsen, Kristiansen (NOR)

22 October 2011; 16:15	MKB Veszprém KC (Hungary)	24 – 22	(Russia) Chekhovskiye Medvedi	Veszprém Aréna, Veszprém; Attendance: 5,000; Referees: Horacek, Novotny (CZE)
22 October 2011; 16:15	Pérez 7	(10–10)	Shelmenko 6	Veszprém Aréna, Veszprém; Attendance: 5,000; Referees: Horacek, Novotny (CZE)
22 October 2011; 16:15	2× (yellow card) 3× (suspension) 1× (red card)	Report	3× (yellow card) 3× (suspension) 1× (red card)	Veszprém Aréna, Veszprém; Attendance: 5,000; Referees: Horacek, Novotny (CZE)

23 October 2011; 15:00	Vive Targi Kielce (Poland)	37 – 29	(Denmark) Bjerringbro-Silkeborg	Hala Legionów, Kielce; Attendance: 4,000; Referees: Stark, Stefan (ROU)
23 October 2011; 15:00	Buntić 9	(21–14)	Petersen 6	Hala Legionów, Kielce; Attendance: 4,000; Referees: Stark, Stefan (ROU)
23 October 2011; 15:00	3× (yellow card) 4× (suspension)	Report	3× (yellow card) 1× (suspension)	Hala Legionów, Kielce; Attendance: 4,000; Referees: Stark, Stefan (ROU)

23 October 2011; 15:30	Füchse Berlin (Germany)	33 – 37	(Spain) Atlético Madrid	Max-Schmeling-Halle, Berlin; Attendance: 9,000; Referees: Gubica, Milosevic (CRO)
23 October 2011; 15:30	Jaszka 10	(15–17)	Lazarov 6	Max-Schmeling-Halle, Berlin; Attendance: 9,000; Referees: Gubica, Milosevic (CRO)
23 October 2011; 15:30	3× (yellow card) 2× (suspension)	Report	3× (yellow card) 2× (suspension)	Max-Schmeling-Halle, Berlin; Attendance: 9,000; Referees: Gubica, Milosevic (CRO)

16 November 2011; 19:15	Füchse Berlin (Germany)	24 – 29	(Hungary) MKB Veszprém KC	Max-Schmeling-Halle, Berlin; Attendance: 6,650; Referees: Dinu, Din (ROU)
16 November 2011; 19:15	Laen 5	(13–15)	Terzić 7	Max-Schmeling-Halle, Berlin; Attendance: 6,650; Referees: Dinu, Din (ROU)
16 November 2011; 19:15	3× (yellow card) 1× (suspension)	Report	3× (yellow card) 7× (suspension)	Max-Schmeling-Halle, Berlin; Attendance: 6,650; Referees: Dinu, Din (ROU)

16 November 2011; 20:00	Vive Targi Kielce (Poland)	29 – 37	(Spain) Atlético Madrid	Hala Legionów, Kielce; Attendance: 4,000; Referees: Horacek, Novotny (CZE)
16 November 2011; 20:00	Jurecki 11	(14–19)	Lazarov, Markussen 8	Hala Legionów, Kielce; Attendance: 4,000; Referees: Horacek, Novotny (CZE)
16 November 2011; 20:00	3× (yellow card) 1× (suspension)	Report	3× (yellow card)	Hala Legionów, Kielce; Attendance: 4,000; Referees: Horacek, Novotny (CZE)

20 November 2011; 16:50	Bjerringbro-Silkeborg (Denmark)	25 – 35	(Russia) Chekhovskiye Medvedi	Silkeborg-Hallerne, Silkeborg; Attendance: 1,700; Referees: Nikolov, Nachevski (MKD)
20 November 2011; 16:50	Kirkegaard, Schmidt 5	(11–22)	Shelmenko 7	Silkeborg-Hallerne, Silkeborg; Attendance: 1,700; Referees: Nikolov, Nachevski (MKD)
20 November 2011; 16:50	3× (yellow card) 2× (suspension)	Report	3× (yellow card) 4× (suspension)	Silkeborg-Hallerne, Silkeborg; Attendance: 1,700; Referees: Nikolov, Nachevski (MKD)

24 November 2011; 19:00	Chekhovskiye Medvedi (Russia)	30 – 23	(Denmark) Bjerringbro-Silkeborg	Olimpiysky Sport Palace, Chekhov; Referees: Buy, Pichon (FRA)
24 November 2011; 19:00	Chipurin 8	(15–13)	Petersen 7	Olimpiysky Sport Palace, Chekhov; Referees: Buy, Pichon (FRA)
24 November 2011; 19:00	3× (yellow card) 1× (suspension)	Report	3× (yellow card) 4× (suspension)	Olimpiysky Sport Palace, Chekhov; Referees: Buy, Pichon (FRA)

27 November 2011; 17:00	MKB Veszprém KC (Hungary)	24 – 33	(Germany) Füchse Berlin	Veszprém Aréna, Veszprém; Attendance: 5,000; Referees: Dentz, Reibel (FRA)
27 November 2011; 17:00	Vujin 7	(10–15)	Laen 7	Veszprém Aréna, Veszprém; Attendance: 5,000; Referees: Dentz, Reibel (FRA)
27 November 2011; 17:00	3× (yellow card) 4× (suspension)	Report	3× (yellow card) 2× (suspension)	Veszprém Aréna, Veszprém; Attendance: 5,000; Referees: Dentz, Reibel (FRA)

27 November 2011; 20:15	Atlético Madrid (Spain)	28 – 27	(Poland) Vive Targi Kielce	Palacio Vistalegre, Madrid; Attendance: 4,850; Referees: Badura, Ondogrecula (SVK)
27 November 2011; 20:15	Lazarov 7	(13–13)	Stojkovic, Tkaczyk 6	Palacio Vistalegre, Madrid; Attendance: 4,850; Referees: Badura, Ondogrecula (SVK)
27 November 2011; 20:15	3× (yellow card) 1× (suspension)	Report	3× (yellow card) 2× (suspension)	Palacio Vistalegre, Madrid; Attendance: 4,850; Referees: Badura, Ondogrecula (SVK)

1 December 2011; 19:00	Chekhovskiye Medvedi (Russia)	29 – 29	(Spain) Atlético Madrid	Olimpiysky Sport Palace, Chekhov; Attendance: 2,400; Referees: Jurinovic, Mrvica (CRO)
1 December 2011; 19:00	Chipurin 7	(18–16)	Lazarov 7	Olimpiysky Sport Palace, Chekhov; Attendance: 2,400; Referees: Jurinovic, Mrvica (CRO)
1 December 2011; 19:00	2× (yellow card) 7× (suspension)	Report	3× (yellow card) 3× (suspension)	Olimpiysky Sport Palace, Chekhov; Attendance: 2,400; Referees: Jurinovic, Mrvica (CRO)

4 December 2011; 15:45	Vive Targi Kielce (Poland)	32 – 29	(Germany) Füchse Berlin	Hala Legionów, Kielce; Attendance: 4,000; Referees: Hansen, Pettersen (NOR)
4 December 2011; 15:45	Stojković 6	(15–17)	Ninčević 8	Hala Legionów, Kielce; Attendance: 4,000; Referees: Hansen, Pettersen (NOR)
4 December 2011; 15:45	3× (yellow card) 7× (suspension)	Report	3× (yellow card) 3× (suspension)	Hala Legionów, Kielce; Attendance: 4,000; Referees: Hansen, Pettersen (NOR)

4 December 2011; 16:50	Bjerringbro-Silkeborg (Denmark)	19 – 25	(Hungary) MKB Veszprém KC	Silkeborg-Hallerne, Silkeborg; Attendance: 1,500; Referees: Pandzic, Mosorinski (SRB)
4 December 2011; 16:50	Petersen, Zvizej 4	(5–14)	Vujin 9	Silkeborg-Hallerne, Silkeborg; Attendance: 1,500; Referees: Pandzic, Mosorinski (SRB)
4 December 2011; 16:50	3× (yellow card) 2× (suspension)	Report	2× (yellow card) 2× (suspension)	Silkeborg-Hallerne, Silkeborg; Attendance: 1,500; Referees: Pandzic, Mosorinski (SRB)

11 February 2012; 16:15	MKB Veszprém KC (Hungary)	21 – 24	(Poland) Vive Targi Kielce	Veszprém Aréna, Veszprém; Attendance: 5,000; Referees: Gjeding, Hansen (DEN)
11 February 2012; 16:15	three players 5	(13–12)	Jurecki 9	Veszprém Aréna, Veszprém; Attendance: 5,000; Referees: Gjeding, Hansen (DEN)
11 February 2012; 16:15	3× (yellow card) 4× (suspension)	Report	2× (yellow card) 7× (suspension)	Veszprém Aréna, Veszprém; Attendance: 5,000; Referees: Gjeding, Hansen (DEN)

11 February 2012; 20:45	Atlético Madrid (Spain)	31 – 27	(Denmark) Bjerringbro-Silkeborg	Palacio Vistalegre, Madrid; Attendance: 3,850; Referees: Eliasson, Gudjonsson (ISL)
11 February 2012; 20:45	Cañellas, Lazarov 6	(15–13)	Kirkegaard 6	Palacio Vistalegre, Madrid; Attendance: 3,850; Referees: Eliasson, Gudjonsson (ISL)
11 February 2012; 20:45	3× (yellow card) 1× (suspension)	Report	3× (yellow card) 4× (suspension)	Palacio Vistalegre, Madrid; Attendance: 3,850; Referees: Eliasson, Gudjonsson (ISL)

12 February 2012; 17:00	Füchse Berlin (Germany)	31 – 28	(Russia) Chekhovskiye Medvedi	Max-Schmeling-Halle, Berlin; Attendance: 8,600; Referees: Krstic, Ljubic (SLO)
12 February 2012; 17:00	Richwien 8	(17–19)	Harbok, Shelmenko 6	Max-Schmeling-Halle, Berlin; Attendance: 8,600; Referees: Krstic, Ljubic (SLO)
12 February 2012; 17:00	3× (yellow card) 2× (suspension)	Report	2× (yellow card) 4× (suspension)	Max-Schmeling-Halle, Berlin; Attendance: 8,600; Referees: Krstic, Ljubic (SLO)

16 February 2012; 19:00	Chekhovskiye Medvedi (Russia)	30 – 26	(Hungary) MKB Veszprém KC	Olimpiysky Sport Palace, Chekhov; Attendance: 2,000; Referees: Stolarovs, Licis (LAT)
16 February 2012; 19:00	Filippov 6	(13–13)	Császár 7	Olimpiysky Sport Palace, Chekhov; Attendance: 2,000; Referees: Stolarovs, Licis (LAT)
16 February 2012; 19:00	3× (yellow card) 3× (suspension)	Report	2× (yellow card) 4× (suspension)	Olimpiysky Sport Palace, Chekhov; Attendance: 2,000; Referees: Stolarovs, Licis (LAT)

19 February 2012; 15:30	Bjerringbro-Silkeborg (Denmark)	26 – 37	(Poland) Vive Targi Kielce	Silkeborg-Hallerne, Silkeborg; Attendance: 2,000; Referees: Malasinskas, Grigalionis (LTU)
19 February 2012; 15:30	Nielsen 7	(12–17)	Jurecki 8	Silkeborg-Hallerne, Silkeborg; Attendance: 2,000; Referees: Malasinskas, Grigalionis (LTU)
19 February 2012; 15:30	3× (yellow card) 2× (suspension)	Report	3× (yellow card) 8× (suspension)	Silkeborg-Hallerne, Silkeborg; Attendance: 2,000; Referees: Malasinskas, Grigalionis (LTU)

19 February 2012; 15:45	Atlético Madrid (Spain)	32 – 27	(Germany) Füchse Berlin	Palacio Vistalegre, Madrid; Attendance: 6,500; Referees: Nikolov, Nachevski (MKD)
19 February 2012; 15:45	Källman, Markussen 6	(13–12)	Romero 6	Palacio Vistalegre, Madrid; Attendance: 6,500; Referees: Nikolov, Nachevski (MKD)
19 February 2012; 15:45	3× (yellow card) 3× (suspension)	Report	3× (yellow card) 2× (suspension)	Palacio Vistalegre, Madrid; Attendance: 6,500; Referees: Nikolov, Nachevski (MKD)

25 February 2012; 14:30	Füchse Berlin (Germany)	28 – 27	(Denmark) Bjerringbro-Silkeborg	Max-Schmeling-Halle, Berlin; Attendance: 8,850; Referees: Cacador, Nicolau (POR)
25 February 2012; 14:30	Christophersen 8	(14–13)	Lauge Schmidt, Nielsen 7	Max-Schmeling-Halle, Berlin; Attendance: 8,850; Referees: Cacador, Nicolau (POR)
25 February 2012; 14:30	1× (yellow card) 2× (suspension) 1× (red card)	Report	3× (yellow card) 4× (suspension) 1× (red card)	Max-Schmeling-Halle, Berlin; Attendance: 8,850; Referees: Cacador, Nicolau (POR)

25 February 2012; 17:00	MKB Veszprém KC (Hungary)	28 – 27	(Spain) Atlético Madrid	Veszprém Aréna, Veszprém; Attendance: 5,000; Referees: Krstic, Ljubic (SLO)
25 February 2012; 17:00	Iváncsik, Vujin 6	(10–11)	Markussen, Parrondo 6	Veszprém Aréna, Veszprém; Attendance: 5,000; Referees: Krstic, Ljubic (SLO)
25 February 2012; 17:00	3× (yellow card) 3× (suspension)	Report	3× (yellow card) 1× (suspension) 1× (red card)	Veszprém Aréna, Veszprém; Attendance: 5,000; Referees: Krstic, Ljubic (SLO)

25 February 2012; 17:00	Vive Targi Kielce (Poland)	26 – 26	(Russia) Chekhovskiye Medvedi	Hala Legionów, Kielce; Attendance: 4,000; Referees: Leifsson, Palsson (ISL)
25 February 2012; 17:00	Jurecki 9	(12–10)	Harbok 9	Hala Legionów, Kielce; Attendance: 4,000; Referees: Leifsson, Palsson (ISL)
25 February 2012; 17:00	3× (yellow card) 5× (suspension)	Report	3× (yellow card) 3× (suspension)	Hala Legionów, Kielce; Attendance: 4,000; Referees: Leifsson, Palsson (ISL)

== Group C ==
Pos	Team	Pld	W	D	L	GF	GA	GD	Pts	HSV	RKK	MET	OWP	STP	HCM
1	(Germany) HSV Hamburg	10	9	1	0	310	245	+65	19	—	27–27	32–25	34–25	32–20	36–25
2	(Slovenia) RK Koper	10	5	3	2	267	248	+19	13	23–24	—	22–22	27–24	30–23	28–24
3	(North Macedonia) RK Metalurg Skopje	10	5	2	3	254	231	+23	12	23–25	28–23	—	31–27	32–19	25–18
4	(Poland) Wisła Płock	10	4	1	5	273	269	+4	9	26–30	25–25	20–24	—	30–26	30–29
5	(Russia) St. Petersburg HC	10	2	1	7	241	301	−60	5	25–36	26–35	25–25	24–32	—	27–25
6	(Romania) HCM Constanța	10	1	0	9	235	286	−51	2	26–34	25–27	20–19	19–34	24–26	—

29 September 2011; 19:00	HSV Hamburg (Germany)	32 – 20	(Russia) St. Petersburg HC	O² World, Hamburg; Attendance: 2,400; Referees: Nybo, Poulsen (DEN)
29 September 2011; 19:00	Flohr 6	(15–10)	Nasyrov 4	O² World, Hamburg; Attendance: 2,400; Referees: Nybo, Poulsen (DEN)
29 September 2011; 19:00	3× (yellow card) 3× (suspension)	Report	3× (yellow card) 4× (suspension)	O² World, Hamburg; Attendance: 2,400; Referees: Nybo, Poulsen (DEN)

1 October 2011; 15:00	Orlen Wisła Płock (Poland)	30 – 29	(Romania) HCM Constanța	Orlen Arena, Płock; Attendance: 3,500; Referees: Togstad, Kristiansen (NOR)
1 October 2011; 15:00	Kavaš, Kubisztal 8	(13–15)	Stamate 10	Orlen Arena, Płock; Attendance: 3,500; Referees: Togstad, Kristiansen (NOR)
1 October 2011; 15:00	3× (yellow card) 4× (suspension) 1× (red card)	Report	3× (yellow card) 6× (suspension) 1× (red card)	Orlen Arena, Płock; Attendance: 3,500; Referees: Togstad, Kristiansen (NOR)

1 October 2011; 18:00	HC Metalurg (North Macedonia)	28 – 23	(Slovenia) Koper	Avtokomanda, Skopje; Attendance: 3,500; Referees: Jurinovic, Mrvica (CRO)
1 October 2011; 18:00	three players 5	(15–7)	Skoko 5	Avtokomanda, Skopje; Attendance: 3,500; Referees: Jurinovic, Mrvica (CRO)
1 October 2011; 18:00	3× (yellow card) 3× (suspension)	Report	3× (yellow card) 6× (suspension)	Avtokomanda, Skopje; Attendance: 3,500; Referees: Jurinovic, Mrvica (CRO)

6 October 2011; 16:00	HCM Constanța (Romania)	26 – 34	(Germany) HSV Hamburg	Sala Sporturilor Romeo Iamandi, Buzău; Attendance: 1,500; Referees: Pandzic, Mosorinski (SRB)
6 October 2011; 16:00	Cseprehi 6	(12–17)	Duvnjak 7	Sala Sporturilor Romeo Iamandi, Buzău; Attendance: 1,500; Referees: Pandzic, Mosorinski (SRB)
6 October 2011; 16:00	3× (yellow card) 1× (suspension)	Report	3× (yellow card) 2× (suspension)	Sala Sporturilor Romeo Iamandi, Buzău; Attendance: 1,500; Referees: Pandzic, Mosorinski (SRB)

8 October 2011; 20:00	Koper (Slovenia)	27 – 24	(Poland) Orlen Wisła Płock	Dvorana Bonifika, Koper; Attendance: 2,100; Referees: Lopez, Ramirez (ESP)
8 October 2011; 20:00	Krivokapić 10	(14–13)	Toromanović 5	Dvorana Bonifika, Koper; Attendance: 2,100; Referees: Lopez, Ramirez (ESP)
8 October 2011; 20:00	3× (yellow card) 8× (suspension)	Report	3× (yellow card) 4× (suspension)	Dvorana Bonifika, Koper; Attendance: 2,100; Referees: Lopez, Ramirez (ESP)

9 October 2011; 15:00	St. Petersburg HC (Russia)	25 – 25	(North Macedonia) HC Metalurg	Sportkompleks "Ubileyniy", St. Petersburg; Attendance: 1,500; Referees: Horacek, Novotny (CZE)
9 October 2011; 15:00	Shindin 9	(10–11)	Marković, Mojsovski 7	Sportkompleks "Ubileyniy", St. Petersburg; Attendance: 1,500; Referees: Horacek, Novotny (CZE)
9 October 2011; 15:00	3× (yellow card) 4× (suspension)	Report	3× (yellow card) 5× (suspension) 1× (red card)	Sportkompleks "Ubileyniy", St. Petersburg; Attendance: 1,500; Referees: Horacek, Novotny (CZE)

13 October 2011; 20:00	HCM Constanța (Romania)	25 – 27	(Slovenia) Koper	Sala Sporturilor, Constanța; Attendance: 1,700; Referees: Stolarovs, Licis (LAT)
13 October 2011; 20:00	Csepreghi 6	(14–14)	Bombač 6	Sala Sporturilor, Constanța; Attendance: 1,700; Referees: Stolarovs, Licis (LAT)
13 October 2011; 20:00	3× (yellow card) 3× (suspension)	Report	3× (yellow card) 3× (suspension) 1× (red card)	Sala Sporturilor, Constanța; Attendance: 1,700; Referees: Stolarovs, Licis (LAT)

16 October 2011; 16:00	Orlen Wisła Płock (Poland)	30 – 26	(Russia) St. Petersburg HC	Orlen Arena, Płock; Attendance: 3,500; Referees: Horváth, Marton (HUN)
16 October 2011; 16:00	Chrapkowski 6	(17–11)	Nasyrov, Pronin 5	Orlen Arena, Płock; Attendance: 3,500; Referees: Horváth, Marton (HUN)
16 October 2011; 16:00	2× (yellow card) 5× (suspension)	Report	3× (yellow card) 3× (suspension)	Orlen Arena, Płock; Attendance: 3,500; Referees: Horváth, Marton (HUN)

16 October 2011; 17:30	HSV Hamburg (Germany)	32 – 25	(North Macedonia) HC Metalurg	O² World, Hamburg; Attendance: 3,250; Referees: Lazaar, Reveret (FRA)
16 October 2011; 17:30	Lacković 6	(18–12)	Mojsovski 8	O² World, Hamburg; Attendance: 3,250; Referees: Lazaar, Reveret (FRA)
16 October 2011; 17:30	3× (yellow card) 3× (suspension)	Report	1× (yellow card) 4× (suspension)	O² World, Hamburg; Attendance: 3,250; Referees: Lazaar, Reveret (FRA)

19 October 2011; 19:00	St. Petersburg HC (Russia)	27 – 25	(Romania) HCM Constanța	Sportkompleks "Ubileyniy", St. Petersburg; Attendance: 800; Referees: San Jose, Murcia (ESP)
19 October 2011; 19:00	Shindin 7	(14–10)	Stavrositu 7	Sportkompleks "Ubileyniy", St. Petersburg; Attendance: 800; Referees: San Jose, Murcia (ESP)
19 October 2011; 19:00	2× (yellow card) 8× (suspension)	Report	3× (yellow card) 8× (suspension)	Sportkompleks "Ubileyniy", St. Petersburg; Attendance: 800; Referees: San Jose, Murcia (ESP)

20 October 2011; 19:00	HC Metalurg (North Macedonia)	31 – 27	(Poland) Orlen Wisła Płock	Boris Trajkovski Sports Center, Skopje; Attendance: 5,500; Referees: Gousko, Repkin (BLR)
20 October 2011; 19:00	Mojsovski 12	(17–10)	Eklemović, Kavaš 5	Boris Trajkovski Sports Center, Skopje; Attendance: 5,500; Referees: Gousko, Repkin (BLR)
20 October 2011; 19:00	3× (yellow card) 3× (suspension)	Report	3× (yellow card) 4× (suspension)	Boris Trajkovski Sports Center, Skopje; Attendance: 5,500; Referees: Gousko, Repkin (BLR)

23 October 2011; 19:00	Koper (Slovenia)	23 – 24	(Germany) Hamburg	Dvorana Bonifika, Koper; Attendance: 2,700; Referees: Badura, Ondogrecula (SVK)
23 October 2011; 19:00	Krivokapić, Skoko 5	(10–17)	Lacković 5	Dvorana Bonifika, Koper; Attendance: 2,700; Referees: Badura, Ondogrecula (SVK)
23 October 2011; 19:00	2× (yellow card) 1× (suspension)	Report	3× (yellow card) 2× (suspension)	Dvorana Bonifika, Koper; Attendance: 2,700; Referees: Badura, Ondogrecula (SVK)

16 November 2011; 20:00	St. Petersburg HC (Russia)	26 – 35	(Slovenia) Koper	Sportkompleks "Ubileyniy", St. Petersburg; Attendance: 1,000; Referees: Pedersen, Mortensen (DEN)
16 November 2011; 20:00	Nasyrov, Shindin 6	(16–18)	Skube 9	Sportkompleks "Ubileyniy", St. Petersburg; Attendance: 1,000; Referees: Pedersen, Mortensen (DEN)
16 November 2011; 20:00	2× (yellow card) 3× (suspension)	Report	3× (yellow card) 5× (suspension)	Sportkompleks "Ubileyniy", St. Petersburg; Attendance: 1,000; Referees: Pedersen, Mortensen (DEN)

19 November 2011; 15:00	Orlen Wisła Płock (Poland)	26 – 30	(Germany) HSV Hamburg	Orlen Arena, Płock; Attendance: 5,000; Referees: Cacador, Nicolau (POR)
19 November 2011; 15:00	Kubisztal 5	(13–14)	Hens 8	Orlen Arena, Płock; Attendance: 5,000; Referees: Cacador, Nicolau (POR)
19 November 2011; 15:00	2× (yellow card) 4× (suspension)	Report	3× (yellow card) 2× (suspension)	Orlen Arena, Płock; Attendance: 5,000; Referees: Cacador, Nicolau (POR)

19 November 2011; 18:00	HC Metalurg (North Macedonia)	25 – 18	(Romania) HCM Constanța	Boris Trajkovski Sports Center, Skopje; Attendance: 6,700; Referees: Nybo, Poulsen (DEN)
19 November 2011; 18:00	Mojsovski 8	(12–8)	Stavrositu, Toma 3	Boris Trajkovski Sports Center, Skopje; Attendance: 6,700; Referees: Nybo, Poulsen (DEN)
19 November 2011; 18:00	3× (yellow card) 1× (suspension)	Report	3× (yellow card) 5× (suspension)	Boris Trajkovski Sports Center, Skopje; Attendance: 6,700; Referees: Nybo, Poulsen (DEN)

24 November 2011; 20:00	HCM Constanța (Romania)	20 – 19	(North Macedonia) HC Metalurg	Sala Sporturilor, Constanța; Attendance: 1,200; Referees: Brunovsky, Canda (SVK)
24 November 2011; 20:00	Csepreghi, Toma 4	(9–12)	Mojsovski 5	Sala Sporturilor, Constanța; Attendance: 1,200; Referees: Brunovsky, Canda (SVK)
24 November 2011; 20:00	3× (yellow card) 5× (suspension)	Report	3× (yellow card) 3× (suspension)	Sala Sporturilor, Constanța; Attendance: 1,200; Referees: Brunovsky, Canda (SVK)

26 November 2011; 17:00	Koper (Slovenia)	30 – 23	(Russia) St. Petersburg HC	Dvorana Bonifika, Koper; Attendance: 1,500; Referees: Hakansson, Nilsson (SWE)
26 November 2011; 17:00	Krivokapić 9	(13–10)	Polyakov 7	Dvorana Bonifika, Koper; Attendance: 1,500; Referees: Hakansson, Nilsson (SWE)
26 November 2011; 17:00	3× (yellow card) 5× (suspension)	Report	3× (yellow card) 4× (suspension) 1× (red card)	Dvorana Bonifika, Koper; Attendance: 1,500; Referees: Hakansson, Nilsson (SWE)

27 November 2011; 15:30	HSV Hamburg (Germany)	34 – 25	(Poland) Orlen Wisła Płock	O² World, Hamburg; Attendance: 3,250; Referees: Olesen, Pedersen (DEN)
27 November 2011; 15:30	Lindberg 7	(14–10)	Wisniewski 4	O² World, Hamburg; Attendance: 3,250; Referees: Olesen, Pedersen (DEN)
27 November 2011; 15:30	3× (yellow card) 4× (suspension)	Report	3× (yellow card) 3× (suspension)	O² World, Hamburg; Attendance: 3,250; Referees: Olesen, Pedersen (DEN)

1 December 2011; 19:00	HSV Hamburg (Germany)	36 – 25	(Romania) HCM Constanța	O² World, Hamburg; Attendance: 1,950; Referees: Samuelsen, Hansen (FRO)
1 December 2011; 19:00	Lacković 8	(20–11)	Riganas, Stavrositu 4	O² World, Hamburg; Attendance: 1,950; Referees: Samuelsen, Hansen (FRO)
1 December 2011; 19:00	2× (yellow card) 1× (suspension)	Report	3× (yellow card) 1× (suspension)	O² World, Hamburg; Attendance: 1,950; Referees: Samuelsen, Hansen (FRO)

3 December 2011; 15:00	Orlen Wisła Płock (Poland)	25 – 25	(Slovenia) Koper	Orlen Arena, Płock; Attendance: 3,500; Referees: Lazaar, Reveret (FRA)
3 December 2011; 15:00	three players 4	(14–12)	Brumen, Krivokapić 7	Orlen Arena, Płock; Attendance: 3,500; Referees: Lazaar, Reveret (FRA)
3 December 2011; 15:00	3× (yellow card) 4× (suspension)	Report	3× (yellow card) 2× (suspension)	Orlen Arena, Płock; Attendance: 3,500; Referees: Lazaar, Reveret (FRA)

3 December 2011; 18:00	HC Metalurg (North Macedonia)	32 – 19	(Russia) St. Petersburg HC	Boris Trajkovski Sports Center, Skopje; Attendance: 7,000; Referees: Kekes, Kekes (HUN)
3 December 2011; 18:00	Marković 9	(16–7)	Lyashenko 6	Boris Trajkovski Sports Center, Skopje; Attendance: 7,000; Referees: Kekes, Kekes (HUN)
3 December 2011; 18:00	3× (yellow card) 1× (suspension)	Report	3× (yellow card) 2× (suspension) 1× (red card)	Boris Trajkovski Sports Center, Skopje; Attendance: 7,000; Referees: Kekes, Kekes (HUN)

9 February 2012; 20:00	HCM Constanța (Romania)	19 – 34	(Poland) Orlen Wisła Płock	Sala Sporturilor, Constanța; Attendance: 1,200; Referees: Sivak, Dvorsky (SVK)
9 February 2012; 20:00	Toma 7	(12–15)	Kubisztal 11	Sala Sporturilor, Constanța; Attendance: 1,200; Referees: Sivak, Dvorsky (SVK)
9 February 2012; 20:00	3× (yellow card) 7× (suspension)	Report	2× (yellow card) 7× (suspension) 1× (red card)	Sala Sporturilor, Constanța; Attendance: 1,200; Referees: Sivak, Dvorsky (SVK)

11 February 2012; 18:00	Koper (Slovenia)	22 – 22	(North Macedonia) Metalurg	Dvorana Bonifika, Koper; Attendance: 2,000; Referees: Abrahamsen, Kristiansen (NOR)
11 February 2012; 18:00	Bombač 7	(11–11)	Marković 6	Dvorana Bonifika, Koper; Attendance: 2,000; Referees: Abrahamsen, Kristiansen (NOR)
11 February 2012; 18:00	3× (yellow card) 3× (suspension)	Report	3× (yellow card) 5× (suspension) 1× (red card)	Dvorana Bonifika, Koper; Attendance: 2,000; Referees: Abrahamsen, Kristiansen (NOR)

12 February 2012; 16:00	St. Petersburg HC (Russia)	25 – 36	(Germany) HSV Hamburg	Sportkompleks "Ubileyniy", St. Petersburg; Attendance: 1,500; Referees: Leandersson, Lindroos (FIN)
12 February 2012; 16:00	Gaboev, Nasyrov 6	(13–17)	Gille 6	Sportkompleks "Ubileyniy", St. Petersburg; Attendance: 1,500; Referees: Leandersson, Lindroos (FIN)
12 February 2012; 16:00	3× (yellow card) 4× (suspension)	Report	2× (yellow card) 3× (suspension)	Sportkompleks "Ubileyniy", St. Petersburg; Attendance: 1,500; Referees: Leandersson, Lindroos (FIN)

16 February 2012; 19:00	Hamburg (Germany)	27 – 27	(Slovenia) Koper	O² World, Hamburg; Attendance: 3,200; Referees: Horváth, Marton (HUN)
16 February 2012; 19:00	Flohr, Lindberg 6	(13–13)	Brumen 7	O² World, Hamburg; Attendance: 3,200; Referees: Horváth, Marton (HUN)
16 February 2012; 19:00	3× (yellow card) 4× (suspension)	Report	3× (yellow card) 4× (suspension)	O² World, Hamburg; Attendance: 3,200; Referees: Horváth, Marton (HUN)

16 February 2012; 20:00	HCM Constanța (Romania)	24 – 26	(Russia) St. Petersburg HC	Sala Sporturilor, Constanța; Attendance: 600; Referees: Hansen, Pettersen (NOR)
16 February 2012; 20:00	Ghionea, Stamate 5	(9–12)	Shindin 7	Sala Sporturilor, Constanța; Attendance: 600; Referees: Hansen, Pettersen (NOR)
16 February 2012; 20:00	3× (yellow card) 3× (suspension)	Report	3× (yellow card) 8× (suspension)	Sala Sporturilor, Constanța; Attendance: 600; Referees: Hansen, Pettersen (NOR)

19 February 2012; 17:30	Orlen Wisła Płock (Poland)	20 – 24	(North Macedonia) HC Metalurg	Orlen Arena, Płock; Attendance: 4,100; Referees: San Jose, Murcia (ESP)
19 February 2012; 17:30	Kubisztal 6	(11–11)	Marković 8	Orlen Arena, Płock; Attendance: 4,100; Referees: San Jose, Murcia (ESP)
19 February 2012; 17:30	3× (yellow card) 3× (suspension)	Report	2× (yellow card) 4× (suspension)	Orlen Arena, Płock; Attendance: 4,100; Referees: San Jose, Murcia (ESP)

25 February 2012; 20:00	RK Koper (Slovenia)	28 – 24	(Romania) Constanța	Dvorana Bonifika, Koper; Attendance: 1,500; Referees: Stenrand, Birch (DEN)
25 February 2012; 20:00	Bombač, Brumen 6	(9–14)	Csepreghi, Irimescu 6	Dvorana Bonifika, Koper; Attendance: 1,500; Referees: Stenrand, Birch (DEN)
25 February 2012; 20:00	3× (yellow card) 3× (suspension)	Report	3× (yellow card) 3× (suspension) 1× (red card)	Dvorana Bonifika, Koper; Attendance: 1,500; Referees: Stenrand, Birch (DEN)

26 February 2012; 15:00	St. Petersburg HC (Russia)	24 – 32	(Poland) Orlen Wisła Płock	Sportkompleks "Ubileyniy", St. Petersburg; Attendance: 700; Referees: Opava, Valek (CZE)
26 February 2012; 15:00	Shindin 7	(12–16)	Spanne 7	Sportkompleks "Ubileyniy", St. Petersburg; Attendance: 700; Referees: Opava, Valek (CZE)
26 February 2012; 15:00	3× (yellow card) 4× (suspension)	Report	2× (yellow card) 6× (suspension)	Sportkompleks "Ubileyniy", St. Petersburg; Attendance: 700; Referees: Opava, Valek (CZE)

26 February 2012; 18:30	HC Metalurg (North Macedonia)	23 – 25	(Germany) HSV Hamburg	Boris Trajkovski Sports Center, Skopje; Attendance: 6,950; Referees: Herczeg, Südi (HUN)
26 February 2012; 18:30	Marković 7	(14–12)	Duvnjak, Lindberg 5	Boris Trajkovski Sports Center, Skopje; Attendance: 6,950; Referees: Herczeg, Südi (HUN)
26 February 2012; 18:30	3× (yellow card) 1× (suspension)	Report	2× (yellow card) 4× (suspension)	Boris Trajkovski Sports Center, Skopje; Attendance: 6,950; Referees: Herczeg, Südi (HUN)

== Group D ==
Pos	Team	Pld	W	D	L	GF	GA	GD	Pts	THW	AGK	CBL	MAH	SCP	RKP
1	(Germany) THW Kiel	10	7	2	1	318	263	+55	16	—	28–26	38–28	23–24	34–24	36–28
2	(Denmark) AG København	10	7	1	2	298	268	+30	15	24–24	—	30–29	31–29	36–24	29–23
3	(Spain) CB Ademar León	10	6	1	3	302	296	+6	13	28–28	28–26	—	29–28	31–25	33–28
4	(France) Montpellier HB	10	5	0	5	307	293	+14	10	31–34	27–31	38–34	—	29–26	36–27
5	(Hungary) SC Pick Szeged	10	3	0	7	285	316	−31	6	26–38	31–34	31–35	38–35	—	31–21
6	(Serbia) RK Partizan	10	0	0	10	243	317	−74	0	24–35	25–31	24–27	20–30	23–29	—

1 October 2011; 17:00	RK Partizan (Serbia)	25 – 31	(Denmark) AG København	Banjica Sport Hall, Belgrade; Attendance: 500; Referees: Cacador, Nicolau (POR)
1 October 2011; 17:00	Dimitrijević, Maksić 5	(12–16)	Sigurðsson 12	Banjica Sport Hall, Belgrade; Attendance: 500; Referees: Cacador, Nicolau (POR)
1 October 2011; 17:00	2× (yellow card) 2× (suspension)	Report	2× (yellow card) 2× (suspension)	Banjica Sport Hall, Belgrade; Attendance: 500; Referees: Cacador, Nicolau (POR)

2 October 2011; 17:00	Montpellier HB (France)	38 – 34	(Spain) CB Ademar León	Arena Montpellier, Montpellier; Attendance: 6,500; Referees: Badura, Ondogrecula (SVK)
2 October 2011; 17:00	Tej 10	(19–18)	Čutura, Straňovský 7	Arena Montpellier, Montpellier; Attendance: 6,500; Referees: Badura, Ondogrecula (SVK)
2 October 2011; 17:00	3× (yellow card) 1× (suspension)	Report	2× (yellow card) 3× (suspension)	Arena Montpellier, Montpellier; Attendance: 6,500; Referees: Badura, Ondogrecula (SVK)

2 October 2011; 19:00	SC Pick Szeged (Hungary)	26 – 38	(Germany) THW Kiel	Városi Sportcsarnok, Szeged; Attendance: 3,500; Referees: Stark, Stefan (ROU)
2 October 2011; 19:00	Zubai 8	(14–16)	Jícha 8	Városi Sportcsarnok, Szeged; Attendance: 3,500; Referees: Stark, Stefan (ROU)
2 October 2011; 19:00	3× (yellow card) 2× (suspension)	Report	2× (yellow card) 5× (suspension)	Városi Sportcsarnok, Szeged; Attendance: 3,500; Referees: Stark, Stefan (ROU)

8 October 2011; 18:00	CB Ademar León (Spain)	33 – 28	(Serbia) RK Partizan	Palacio Municipal, León; Attendance: 3,000; Referees: Hansen, Pettersen (NOR)
8 October 2011; 18:00	Krivoshlykov 6	(20–12)	Maksić 6	Palacio Municipal, León; Attendance: 3,000; Referees: Hansen, Pettersen (NOR)
8 October 2011; 18:00	3× (yellow card) 3× (suspension)	Report	3× (yellow card) 4× (suspension)	Palacio Municipal, León; Attendance: 3,000; Referees: Hansen, Pettersen (NOR)

9 October 2011; 16:50	AG København (Denmark)	36 – 24	(Hungary) SC Pick Szeged	Ballerup Super Arena, Ballerup; Attendance: 5,500; Referees: Gousko, Repkin (BLR)
9 October 2011; 16:50	Hansen 10	(18–11)	Šulc 8	Ballerup Super Arena, Ballerup; Attendance: 5,500; Referees: Gousko, Repkin (BLR)
9 October 2011; 16:50	3× (yellow card) 5× (suspension)	Report	1× (yellow card) 5× (suspension) 1× (red card)	Ballerup Super Arena, Ballerup; Attendance: 5,500; Referees: Gousko, Repkin (BLR)

9 October 2011; 19:00	THW Kiel (Germany)	23 – 24	(France) Montpellier HB	Sparkassen-Arena, Kiel; Attendance: 10,000; Referees: Abrahamsen, Kristiansen (NOR)
9 October 2011; 19:00	Jícha 6	(14–10)	Accambray 8	Sparkassen-Arena, Kiel; Attendance: 10,000; Referees: Abrahamsen, Kristiansen (NOR)
9 October 2011; 19:00	3× (yellow card) 2× (suspension)	Report	3× (yellow card) 2× (suspension) 1× (red card)	Sparkassen-Arena, Kiel; Attendance: 10,000; Referees: Abrahamsen, Kristiansen (NOR)

15 October 2011; 16:15	SC Pick Szeged (Hungary)	31 – 35	(Spain) CB Ademar León	Városi Sportcsarnok, Szeged; Attendance: 2,000; Referees: Zotin, Volodkov (RUS)
15 October 2011; 16:15	Šulc 10	(16–16)	Straňovský 9	Városi Sportcsarnok, Szeged; Attendance: 2,000; Referees: Zotin, Volodkov (RUS)
15 October 2011; 16:15	3× (yellow card) 3× (suspension) 1× (red card)	Report	3× (yellow card) 4× (suspension)	Városi Sportcsarnok, Szeged; Attendance: 2,000; Referees: Zotin, Volodkov (RUS)

16 October 2011; 17:00	Montpellier HB (France)	36 – 27	(Serbia) RK Partizan	Arena Montpellier, Montpellier; Attendance: 7,000; Referees: Kavulic, Skruzny (CZE)
16 October 2011; 17:00	Kavtičnik 8	(22–14)	Mandić 6	Arena Montpellier, Montpellier; Attendance: 7,000; Referees: Kavulic, Skruzny (CZE)
16 October 2011; 17:00	2× (yellow card) 2× (suspension)	Report	3× (yellow card) 7× (suspension)	Arena Montpellier, Montpellier; Attendance: 7,000; Referees: Kavulic, Skruzny (CZE)

22 October 2011; 17:00	CB Ademar León (Spain)	28 – 28	(Germany) THW Kiel	Palacio Municipal, León; Attendance: 5,200; Referees: Leifsson, Palsson (ISL)
22 October 2011; 17:00	Straňovský 8	(12–15)	three players 6	Palacio Municipal, León; Attendance: 5,200; Referees: Leifsson, Palsson (ISL)
22 October 2011; 17:00	2× (yellow card) 1× (suspension)	Report	3× (yellow card) 4× (suspension)	Palacio Municipal, León; Attendance: 5,200; Referees: Leifsson, Palsson (ISL)

23 October 2011; 16:50	AG København (Denmark)	31 – 29	(France) Montpellier HB	Ballerup Super Arena, Ballerup; Attendance: 5,600; Referees: Dinu, Din (ROU)
23 October 2011; 16:50	Ekberg, Sigurðsson 9	(21–12)	Kavtičnik 11	Ballerup Super Arena, Ballerup; Attendance: 5,600; Referees: Dinu, Din (ROU)
23 October 2011; 16:50	2× (yellow card) 5× (suspension)	Report	2× (yellow card) 3× (suspension)	Ballerup Super Arena, Ballerup; Attendance: 5,600; Referees: Dinu, Din (ROU)

23 October 2011; 19:00	RK Partizan (Serbia)	23 – 29	(Hungary) SC Pick Szeged	Banjica Sport Hall, Belgrade; Attendance: 1,100; Referees: Sivak, Dvorsky (SVK)
23 October 2011; 19:00	Kostadinović, Mandić 7	(13–16)	Šulc 9	Banjica Sport Hall, Belgrade; Attendance: 1,100; Referees: Sivak, Dvorsky (SVK)
23 October 2011; 19:00	3× (yellow card) 5× (suspension)	Report	3× (yellow card) 8× (suspension)	Banjica Sport Hall, Belgrade; Attendance: 1,100; Referees: Sivak, Dvorsky (SVK)

19 November 2011; 16:15	SC Pick Szeged (Hungary)	38 – 35	(France) Montpellier HB	Városi Sportcsarnok, Szeged; Attendance: 3,500; Referees: Kouz, Zhoba (UKR)
19 November 2011; 16:15	Šulc 9	(18–17)	Accambray 10	Városi Sportcsarnok, Szeged; Attendance: 3,500; Referees: Kouz, Zhoba (UKR)
19 November 2011; 16:15	3× (yellow card) 4× (suspension)	Report	2× (yellow card) 7× (suspension)	Városi Sportcsarnok, Szeged; Attendance: 3,500; Referees: Kouz, Zhoba (UKR)

19 November 2011; 19:00	CB Ademar León (Spain)	28 – 26	(Denmark) AG København	Palacio Municipal, León; Attendance: 5,000; Referees: Krstic, Ljubic (SVN)
19 November 2011; 19:00	Garcia Robledo 9	(14–12)	Hansen 7	Palacio Municipal, León; Attendance: 5,000; Referees: Krstic, Ljubic (SVN)
19 November 2011; 19:00	3× (yellow card) 1× (suspension)	Report	3× (yellow card) 5× (suspension)	Palacio Municipal, León; Attendance: 5,000; Referees: Krstic, Ljubic (SVN)

20 November 2011; 17:00	THW Kiel (Germany)	36 – 28	(Serbia) RK Partizan	Sparkassen-Arena, Kiel; Attendance: 8,000; Referees: Gousko, Repkin (BLR)
20 November 2011; 17:00	Lundström 8	(17–18)	Dimitrijević 8	Sparkassen-Arena, Kiel; Attendance: 8,000; Referees: Gousko, Repkin (BLR)
20 November 2011; 17:00	3× (yellow card) 4× (suspension)	Report	3× (yellow card) 3× (suspension)	Sparkassen-Arena, Kiel; Attendance: 8,000; Referees: Gousko, Repkin (BLR)

23 November 2011; 19:00	RK Partizan (Serbia)	24 – 35	(Germany) THW Kiel	Banjica Sport Hall, Belgrade; Attendance: 2,700; Referees: Baranowski, Lemanowicz (POL)
23 November 2011; 19:00	Dimitrijević 4	(10–19)	Jícha 11	Banjica Sport Hall, Belgrade; Attendance: 2,700; Referees: Baranowski, Lemanowicz (POL)
23 November 2011; 19:00	3× (yellow card) 2× (suspension)	Report	3× (yellow card) 2× (suspension)	Banjica Sport Hall, Belgrade; Attendance: 2,700; Referees: Baranowski, Lemanowicz (POL)

27 November 2011; 16:50	AG København (Denmark)	30 – 29	(Spain) CB Ademar León	Ballerup Super Arena, Ballerup; Attendance: 5,600; Referees: Eliasson, Gudjonsson (ISL)
27 November 2011; 16:50	Hansen 9	(14–15)	Stranovsky 6	Ballerup Super Arena, Ballerup; Attendance: 5,600; Referees: Eliasson, Gudjonsson (ISL)
27 November 2011; 16:50	3× (yellow card) 3× (suspension)	Report	3× (yellow card) 1× (suspension)	Ballerup Super Arena, Ballerup; Attendance: 5,600; Referees: Eliasson, Gudjonsson (ISL)

4 December 2011; 15:00	SC Pick Szeged (Hungary)	31 – 34	(Denmark) AG København	Városi Sportcsarnok, Szeged; Attendance: 3,500; Referees: Buache, Meyer (SUI)
4 December 2011; 15:00	Buday, Šulc 8	(17–19)	Hansen 9	Városi Sportcsarnok, Szeged; Attendance: 3,500; Referees: Buache, Meyer (SUI)
4 December 2011; 15:00	3× (yellow card) 2× (suspension)	Report	2× (yellow card) 4× (suspension)	Városi Sportcsarnok, Szeged; Attendance: 3,500; Referees: Buache, Meyer (SUI)

4 December 2011; 17:15	Montpellier HB (France)	31 – 34	(Germany) THW Kiel	Arena Montpellier, Montpellier; Attendance: 8,500; Referees: Krstic, Ljubic (SLO)
4 December 2011; 17:15	Accambray 8	(17–16)	Andersson 9	Arena Montpellier, Montpellier; Attendance: 8,500; Referees: Krstic, Ljubic (SLO)
4 December 2011; 17:15	3× (yellow card) 2× (suspension)	Report	3× (yellow card) 5× (suspension) 1× (red card)	Arena Montpellier, Montpellier; Attendance: 8,500; Referees: Krstic, Ljubic (SLO)

4 December 2011; 19:00	RK Partizan (Serbia)	24 – 27	(Spain) CB Ademar León	Banjica Sport Hall, Belgrade; Attendance: 1,000; Referees: Novikov, Perepilitsy (UKR)
4 December 2011; 19:00	Dimitrijević, Maksić 6	(10–14)	Garcia Robledo 5	Banjica Sport Hall, Belgrade; Attendance: 1,000; Referees: Novikov, Perepilitsy (UKR)
4 December 2011; 19:00	3× (yellow card) 5× (suspension)	Report	3× (yellow card) 1× (suspension)	Banjica Sport Hall, Belgrade; Attendance: 1,000; Referees: Novikov, Perepilitsy (UKR)

18 December 2011; 17:00	THW Kiel (Germany)	28 – 26	(Denmark) AG København	Sparkassen-Arena, Kiel; Attendance: 10,250; Referees: Nikolov, Nachevski (MKD)
18 December 2011; 17:00	Zeitz 7	(12–14)	Ekberg, Hansen 8	Sparkassen-Arena, Kiel; Attendance: 10,250; Referees: Nikolov, Nachevski (MKD)
18 December 2011; 17:00	3× (yellow card) 3× (suspension)	Report	3× (yellow card) 5× (suspension)	Sparkassen-Arena, Kiel; Attendance: 10,250; Referees: Nikolov, Nachevski (MKD)

18 December 2011; 17:00	Montpellier HB (France)	29 – 26	(Hungary) SC Pick Szeged	Arena Montpellier, Montpellier; Attendance: 7,500; Referees: Cacador, Nicolau (POR)
18 December 2011; 17:00	Gajič 7	(17–14)	Ancsin 7	Arena Montpellier, Montpellier; Attendance: 7,500; Referees: Cacador, Nicolau (POR)
18 December 2011; 17:00	3× (yellow card) 6× (suspension)	Report	3× (yellow card) 4× (suspension)	Arena Montpellier, Montpellier; Attendance: 7,500; Referees: Cacador, Nicolau (POR)

9 February 2012; 19:00	THW Kiel (Germany)	34 – 24	(Hungary) SC Pick Szeged	Sparkassen-Arena, Kiel; Attendance: 10,000; Referees: Jurinovic, Mrvica (CRO)
9 February 2012; 19:00	Sprenger 11	(18–12)	Beocanin, Šulc 6	Sparkassen-Arena, Kiel; Attendance: 10,000; Referees: Jurinovic, Mrvica (CRO)
9 February 2012; 19:00	3× (yellow card)	Report	3× (yellow card) 1× (suspension)	Sparkassen-Arena, Kiel; Attendance: 10,000; Referees: Jurinovic, Mrvica (CRO)

12 February 2012; 16:50	AG København (Denmark)	29 – 23	(Serbia) RK Partizan	Ballerup Super Arena, Ballerup; Attendance: 5,600; Referees: Hajek, Macho (CZE)
12 February 2012; 16:50	Ekberg 6	(18–11)	Ilić 6	Ballerup Super Arena, Ballerup; Attendance: 5,600; Referees: Hajek, Macho (CZE)
12 February 2012; 16:50	3× (yellow card)	Report	2× (yellow card) 4× (suspension)	Ballerup Super Arena, Ballerup; Attendance: 5,600; Referees: Hajek, Macho (CZE)

12 February 2012; 18:30	CB Ademar León (Spain)	29 – 28	(France) Montpellier HB	Palacio Municipal, León; Attendance: 5,200; Referees: Nikolic, Stojkovic (SRB)
12 February 2012; 18:30	Ruesga 11	(13–12)	Kavtičnik 11	Palacio Municipal, León; Attendance: 5,200; Referees: Nikolic, Stojkovic (SRB)
12 February 2012; 18:30	3× (yellow card) 6× (suspension)	Report	3× (yellow card) 5× (suspension)	Palacio Municipal, León; Attendance: 5,200; Referees: Nikolic, Stojkovic (SRB)

18 February 2012; 16:15	SC Pick Szeged (Hungary)	31 – 21	(Serbia) RK Partizan	Városi Sportcsarnok, Szeged; Attendance: 2,500; Referees: Yudchyts, Kot (BLR)
18 February 2012; 16:15	Ancsin 8	(13–10)	Maksić, Mešter 4	Városi Sportcsarnok, Szeged; Attendance: 2,500; Referees: Yudchyts, Kot (BLR)
18 February 2012; 16:15	3× (yellow card) 2× (suspension)	Report	3× (yellow card) 5× (suspension)	Városi Sportcsarnok, Szeged; Attendance: 2,500; Referees: Yudchyts, Kot (BLR)

19 February 2012; 17:00	Montpellier HB (France)	27 – 31	(Denmark) AG København	Arena Montpellier, Montpellier; Attendance: 8,000; Referees: Gubica, Milosevic (CRO)
19 February 2012; 17:00	Karabatić 9	(14–17)	Sigurðsson 8	Arena Montpellier, Montpellier; Attendance: 8,000; Referees: Gubica, Milosevic (CRO)
19 February 2012; 17:00	3× (yellow card) 1× (suspension)	Report	3× (yellow card) 3× (suspension)	Arena Montpellier, Montpellier; Attendance: 8,000; Referees: Gubica, Milosevic (CRO)

19 February 2012; 18:45	THW Kiel (Germany)	38 – 28	(Spain) CB Ademar León	Sparkassen-Arena, Kiel; Attendance: 10,000; Referees: Horacek, Novotny (CZE)
19 February 2012; 18:45	Ilić 10	(19–13)	Ruesga 8	Sparkassen-Arena, Kiel; Attendance: 10,000; Referees: Horacek, Novotny (CZE)
19 February 2012; 18:45	3× (yellow card) 5× (suspension)	Report	3× (yellow card) 6× (suspension) 1× (red card)	Sparkassen-Arena, Kiel; Attendance: 10,000; Referees: Horacek, Novotny (CZE)

26 February 2012; 16:50	AG København (Denmark)	24 – 24	(Germany) THW Kiel	Ballerup Super Arena, Ballerup; Attendance: 5,600; Referees: Abrahamsen, Kristiansen (NOR)
26 February 2012; 16:50	Sigurðsson 8	(11–11)	Andersson, Ilić 5	Ballerup Super Arena, Ballerup; Attendance: 5,600; Referees: Abrahamsen, Kristiansen (NOR)
26 February 2012; 16:50	2× (yellow card) 3× (suspension)	Report	2× (yellow card) 3× (suspension)	Ballerup Super Arena, Ballerup; Attendance: 5,600; Referees: Abrahamsen, Kristiansen (NOR)

26 February 2012; 18:00	CB Ademar León (Spain)	31 – 25	(Hungary) SC Pick Szeged	Palacio Municipal, León; Attendance: 3,500; Referees: Baranowski, Lemanowicz (POL)
26 February 2012; 18:00	Straňovský 6	(17–10)	Ancsin 8	Palacio Municipal, León; Attendance: 3,500; Referees: Baranowski, Lemanowicz (POL)
26 February 2012; 18:00	3× (yellow card) 4× (suspension)	Report	3× (yellow card) 5× (suspension)	Palacio Municipal, León; Attendance: 3,500; Referees: Baranowski, Lemanowicz (POL)

26 February 2012; 19:00	RK Partizan (Serbia)	20 – 30	(France) Montpellier HB	Banjica Sport Hall, Belgrade; Attendance: 1,000; Referees: Stark, Stefan (ROU)
26 February 2012; 19:00	Maksić 6	(7–16)	Kavtičnik 6	Banjica Sport Hall, Belgrade; Attendance: 1,000; Referees: Stark, Stefan (ROU)
26 February 2012; 19:00	3× (yellow card) 4× (suspension)	Report	3× (yellow card) 1× (suspension)	Banjica Sport Hall, Belgrade; Attendance: 1,000; Referees: Stark, Stefan (ROU)
