= 2011–12 EHF Champions League knockout stage =

The knockout stage of the 2011–12 EHF Champions League was held from 14 March 2012 till 27 May 2012. The top four teams from the group stage advanced to the Round of last 16.

== Seedings ==
The draw was held on 28 February 2012. Teams from pot 1 were drawn against teams from pot 4 and teams from pot 2 were drawn against teams from pot 3. Teams from pot 1 and 2 will play the second legs at home.

Group	Pot 1	Pot 2	Pot 3	Pot 4
A	(Spain) FC Barcelona Intersport	(Croatia) RK Zagreb	(Sweden) IK Sävehof	(Switzerland) Kadetten Schaffhausen
B	(Spain) Atlético Madrid	(Hungary) MKB Veszprém KC	(Poland) Vive Targi Kielce	(Germany) Füchse Berlin
C	(Germany) HSV Hamburg	(Slovenia) RK Cimos Koper	(North Macedonia) HC Metalurg	(Poland) Orlen Wisła Płock
D	(Germany) THW Kiel	(Denmark) AG København	(Spain) CB Ademar León	(France) Montpellier HB

== Last 16 ==
The first legs were played on 14–18 March, and the second legs will be played on 18, 24 and 25 March 2012.

Team #1	Agg.	Team #2	1st match	2nd match
Füchse Berlin (Germany)	56–53	(Germany) HSV Hamburg	32–30	24–23
Montpellier HB (France)	50–64	(Spain) FC Barcelona Intersport	30–28	20–36
Orlen Wisła Płock (Poland)	48–63	(Germany) THW Kiel	24–36	24–27
Kadetten Schaffhausen (Switzerland)	57–62	(Spain) Atlético Madrid	27–36	30–26
CB Ademar León (Spain)	56–55	(Hungary) MKB Veszprém KC	31–28	25–27
Vive Targi Kielce (Poland)	50–51	(Slovenia) RK Cimos Koper	27–26	23–25
HC Metalurg (North Macedonia)	40–44	(Croatia) RK Zagreb	19–18	21–26
IK Sävehof (Sweden)	49–60	(Denmark) AG København	25–34	24–26

=== First leg ===
14 March 2012; 20:00	Orlen Wisła Płock (Poland)	24 – 36	(Germany) THW Kiel	Orlen Arena, Płock; Attendance: 5,100; Referees: Stark, Stefan (ROU)
14 March 2012; 20:00	Spanne 6	(12–14)	Jícha 7	Orlen Arena, Płock; Attendance: 5,100; Referees: Stark, Stefan (ROU)
14 March 2012; 20:00	3× (yellow card) 3× (suspension)	Report	2× (yellow card) 1× (suspension)	Orlen Arena, Płock; Attendance: 5,100; Referees: Stark, Stefan (ROU)

15 March 2012; 19:30	Kadetten Schaffhausen (Switzerland)	27 – 36	(Spain) Atlético Madrid	Schweizersbildhalle, Schaffhausen; Attendance: 3,400; Referees: Mazeika, Gatelis (LTU)
15 March 2012; 19:30	Kukucka, Stojanović 5	(11–15)	Aguinagalde, Markussen 7	Schweizersbildhalle, Schaffhausen; Attendance: 3,400; Referees: Mazeika, Gatelis (LTU)
15 March 2012; 19:30	2× (yellow card) 2× (suspension)	Report	3× (yellow card) 3× (suspension)	Schweizersbildhalle, Schaffhausen; Attendance: 3,400; Referees: Mazeika, Gatelis (LTU)

17 March 2012; 17:00	CB Ademar León (Spain)	31 – 28	(Hungary) MKB Veszprém KC	Palacio Municipal, León; Attendance: 4,600; Referees: Nikolov, Nachevski (MKD)
17 March 2012; 17:00	Straňovský 9	(19–19)	Császár 10	Palacio Municipal, León; Attendance: 4,600; Referees: Nikolov, Nachevski (MKD)
17 March 2012; 17:00	3× (yellow card) 2× (suspension)	Report	3× (yellow card) 7× (suspension) 2× (red card)	Palacio Municipal, León; Attendance: 4,600; Referees: Nikolov, Nachevski (MKD)

18 March 2012; 16:00	Füchse Berlin (Germany)	32 – 30	(Germany) HSV Hamburg	Max-Schmeling-Halle, Berlin; Attendance: 8,900; Referees: Gjeding, Hansen (DEN)
18 March 2012; 16:00	Christophersen 8	(15–15)	Lindberg 8	Max-Schmeling-Halle, Berlin; Attendance: 8,900; Referees: Gjeding, Hansen (DEN)
18 March 2012; 16:00	2× (yellow card) 1× (suspension)	Report	3× (yellow card) 4× (suspension)	Max-Schmeling-Halle, Berlin; Attendance: 8,900; Referees: Gjeding, Hansen (DEN)

18 March 2012; 16:30	IK Sävehof (Sweden)	25 – 34	(Denmark) AG København	Partillebohallen, Partille; Attendance: 4,200; Referees: Nikolic, Stojkovic (SRB)
18 March 2012; 16:30	Berggren, Fridén 7	(9–19)	Larsen 6	Partillebohallen, Partille; Attendance: 4,200; Referees: Nikolic, Stojkovic (SRB)
18 March 2012; 16:30	3× (yellow card) 4× (suspension)	Report	3× (yellow card) 4× (suspension)	Partillebohallen, Partille; Attendance: 4,200; Referees: Nikolic, Stojkovic (SRB)

18 March 2012; 17:00	HC Metalurg (North Macedonia)	19 – 18	(Croatia) RK Zagreb	Boris Trajkovski Sports Center, Skopje; Attendance: 7,000; Referees: Fleisch, Rieber (GER)
18 March 2012; 17:00	Marković 7	(7–9)	Štrlek 5	Boris Trajkovski Sports Center, Skopje; Attendance: 7,000; Referees: Fleisch, Rieber (GER)
18 March 2012; 17:00	3× (yellow card) 2× (suspension)	Report	3× (yellow card) 5× (suspension)	Boris Trajkovski Sports Center, Skopje; Attendance: 7,000; Referees: Fleisch, Rieber (GER)

18 March 2012; 17:00	Montpellier HB (France)	30 – 28	(Spain) FC Barcelona Intersport	Arena Montpellier, Montpellier; Attendance: 3,000; Referees: Horacek, Novotny (CZE)
18 March 2012; 17:00	Gajić 8	(17–11)	Rutenka 5	Arena Montpellier, Montpellier; Attendance: 3,000; Referees: Horacek, Novotny (CZE)
18 March 2012; 17:00	3× (yellow card) 5× (suspension) 1× (red card)	Report	3× (yellow card) 4× (suspension)	Arena Montpellier, Montpellier; Attendance: 3,000; Referees: Horacek, Novotny (CZE)

18 March 2012; 20:30	Vive Targi Kielce (Poland)	27 – 26	(Slovenia) RK Cimos Koper	Hala Legionów, Kielce; Attendance: 4,000; Referees: Lazaar, Reveret (FRA)
18 March 2012; 20:30	Buntić 7	(13–12)	Brumen 8	Hala Legionów, Kielce; Attendance: 4,000; Referees: Lazaar, Reveret (FRA)
18 March 2012; 20:30	3× (yellow card) 3× (suspension)	Report	3× (yellow card) 4× (suspension)	Hala Legionów, Kielce; Attendance: 4,000; Referees: Lazaar, Reveret (FRA)

=== Second leg ===
18 March 2012; 17:30	THW Kiel (Germany)	27 – 24	(Poland) Orlen Wisła Płock	Sparkassen-Arena, Kiel; Attendance: 9,050; Referees: Dobrovits, Tajok (HUN)
18 March 2012; 17:30	Ilić 8	(15–10)	Kubisztal 7	Sparkassen-Arena, Kiel; Attendance: 9,050; Referees: Dobrovits, Tajok (HUN)
18 March 2012; 17:30	1× (yellow card) 4× (suspension)	Report	2× (yellow card) 4× (suspension) 1× (red card)	Sparkassen-Arena, Kiel; Attendance: 9,050; Referees: Dobrovits, Tajok (HUN)

24 March 2012; 18:00	RK Cimos Koper (Slovenia)	25 – 23	(Poland) Vive Targi Kielce	Dvorana Bonifika, Koper; Attendance: 3,000; Referees: Geipel, Helbig (GER)
24 March 2012; 18:00	Brumen 8	(12–13)	Stojković 5	Dvorana Bonifika, Koper; Attendance: 3,000; Referees: Geipel, Helbig (GER)
24 March 2012; 18:00	3× (yellow card) 4× (suspension)	Report	3× (yellow card) 5× (suspension) 1× (red card)	Dvorana Bonifika, Koper; Attendance: 3,000; Referees: Geipel, Helbig (GER)

24 March 2012; 20:00	AG København (Denmark)	26 – 24	(Sweden) IK Sävehof	Ballerup Super Arena, Ballerup; Attendance: 5,600; Referees: Togstad, Kristiansen (NOR)
24 March 2012; 20:00	Hansen 7	(14–12)	Berggren 7	Ballerup Super Arena, Ballerup; Attendance: 5,600; Referees: Togstad, Kristiansen (NOR)
24 March 2012; 20:00	2× (yellow card) 2× (suspension)	Report	3× (yellow card) 2× (suspension)	Ballerup Super Arena, Ballerup; Attendance: 5,600; Referees: Togstad, Kristiansen (NOR)

24 March 2012; 20:15	RK Zagreb (Croatia)	26 – 21	(North Macedonia) HC Metalurg	Arena Zagreb, Zagreb; Attendance: 8,500; Referees: Lopez, Ramirez (ESP)
24 March 2012; 20:15	Horvat 7	(12–10)	Mojsovski 7	Arena Zagreb, Zagreb; Attendance: 8,500; Referees: Lopez, Ramirez (ESP)
24 March 2012; 20:15	3× (yellow card) 5× (suspension)	Report	2× (yellow card) 6× (suspension)	Arena Zagreb, Zagreb; Attendance: 8,500; Referees: Lopez, Ramirez (ESP)

25 March 2012; 15:45	Atlético Madrid (Spain)	26 – 30	(Switzerland) Kadetten Schaffhausen	Palacio Vistalegre, Madrid; Attendance: 4,200; Referees: Stenrand, Birch (DEN)
25 March 2012; 15:45	Lazarov 9	(14–14)	Graubner 6	Palacio Vistalegre, Madrid; Attendance: 4,200; Referees: Stenrand, Birch (DEN)
25 March 2012; 15:45	2× (yellow card) 4× (suspension)	Report	3× (yellow card) 7× (suspension)	Palacio Vistalegre, Madrid; Attendance: 4,200; Referees: Stenrand, Birch (DEN)

25 March 2012; 17:00	FC Barcelona Intersport (Spain)	36 – 20	(France) Montpellier HB	Palau Blaugrana, Blaugrana; Attendance: 6,700; Referees: Krstic, Ljubic (SLO)
25 March 2012; 17:00	Nagy, Sarmiento 6	(17–8)	Gajić 7	Palau Blaugrana, Blaugrana; Attendance: 6,700; Referees: Krstic, Ljubic (SLO)
25 March 2012; 17:00	3× (yellow card) 2× (suspension) 1× (red card)	Report	3× (yellow card) 2× (suspension)	Palau Blaugrana, Blaugrana; Attendance: 6,700; Referees: Krstic, Ljubic (SLO)

25 March 2012; 17:15	HSV Hamburg (Germany)	23 – 24	(Germany) Füchse Berlin	O² World, Hamburg; Attendance: 7,800; Referees: Dentz, Reibel (FRA)
25 March 2012; 17:15	Lindberg 5	(11–10)	five players 4	O² World, Hamburg; Attendance: 7,800; Referees: Dentz, Reibel (FRA)
25 March 2012; 17:15	3× (yellow card) 4× (suspension)	Report	3× (yellow card) 3× (suspension)	O² World, Hamburg; Attendance: 7,800; Referees: Dentz, Reibel (FRA)

25 March 2012; 18:00	MKB Veszprém KC (Hungary)	27 – 25	(Spain) CB Ademar León	Veszprém Aréna, Veszprém; Attendance: 5,000; Referees: Abrahamsen, Kristiansen (NOR)
25 March 2012; 18:00	Vujin 8	(16–12)	García Robledo, Straňovský 6	Veszprém Aréna, Veszprém; Attendance: 5,000; Referees: Abrahamsen, Kristiansen (NOR)
25 March 2012; 18:00	3× (yellow card) 6× (suspension)	Report	3× (yellow card) 9× (suspension) 1× (red card)	Veszprém Aréna, Veszprém; Attendance: 5,000; Referees: Abrahamsen, Kristiansen (NOR)

== Quarterfinals ==
The draw was held on 27 March 2012 at 11:30 local time in Vienna. The first legs were played on 18–22 April, and the second legs were played on 25–29 April 2012.

=== Seedings ===
Pot 1	Pot 2
(Spain) FC Barcelona Intersport (Germany) THW Kiel (Spain) Atlético Madrid (Germany) Füchse Berlin	(Spain) CB Ademar León (Denmark) AG København (Slovenia) RK Cimos Koper (Croatia) RK Zagreb

Team #1	Agg.	Team #2	1st match	2nd match
AG København (Denmark)	62–59	(Spain) FC Barcelona Intersport	29–23	33–36
CB Ademar León (Spain)	52–52	(Germany) Füchse Berlin	34–23	18–29
RK Zagreb (Croatia)	58–64	(Germany) THW Kiel	31–31	27–33
RK Cimos Koper (Slovenia)	50–54	(Spain) Atlético Madrid	26–23	24–31

=== First leg ===
20 April 2012; 20:10	AG København (Denmark)	29 – 23	(Spain) FC Barcelona Intersport	Parken Stadium, Copenhagen; Attendance: 21,500; Referees: Geipel, Helbig (GER)
20 April 2012; 20:10	Hansen 8	(16–11)	Nagy 6	Parken Stadium, Copenhagen; Attendance: 21,500; Referees: Geipel, Helbig (GER)
20 April 2012; 20:10	3× (yellow card) 6× (suspension) 1× (red card)	Report	3× (yellow card) 4× (suspension) 1× (red card)	Parken Stadium, Copenhagen; Attendance: 21,500; Referees: Geipel, Helbig (GER)

21 April 2012; 17:30	CB Ademar León (Spain)	34 – 23	(Germany) Füchse Berlin	Palacio Municipal, León; Attendance: 6,000; Referees: Gubica, Milosevic (CRO)
21 April 2012; 17:30	Stranovsky 8	(15–9)	Romero 8	Palacio Municipal, León; Attendance: 6,000; Referees: Gubica, Milosevic (CRO)
21 April 2012; 17:30	3× (yellow card) 5× (suspension)	Report	3× (yellow card) 4× (suspension)	Palacio Municipal, León; Attendance: 6,000; Referees: Gubica, Milosevic (CRO)

21 April 2012; 18:00	RK Cimos Koper (Slovenia)	26 – 23	(Spain) Atlético Madrid	Dvorana Bonifika, Koper; Attendance: 3,000; Referees: Gjeding, Hansen (DEN)
21 April 2012; 18:00	three players 5	(13–12)	Abalo, Fernandez Roura 4	Dvorana Bonifika, Koper; Attendance: 3,000; Referees: Gjeding, Hansen (DEN)
21 April 2012; 18:00	3× (yellow card) 7× (suspension) 1× (red card)	Report	2× (yellow card) 3× (suspension) 1× (red card)	Dvorana Bonifika, Koper; Attendance: 3,000; Referees: Gjeding, Hansen (DEN)

21 April 2012; 19:15	RK Zagreb (Croatia)	31 – 31	(Germany) THW Kiel	Arena Zagreb, Zagreb; Attendance: 13,000; Referees: Mazeika, Gatelis (LTU)
21 April 2012; 19:15	Horvat 8	(15–12)	Jícha 8	Arena Zagreb, Zagreb; Attendance: 13,000; Referees: Mazeika, Gatelis (LTU)
21 April 2012; 19:15	3× (yellow card) 3× (suspension)	Report	3× (yellow card) 2× (suspension)	Arena Zagreb, Zagreb; Attendance: 13,000; Referees: Mazeika, Gatelis (LTU)

=== Second leg ===
28 April 2012; 20:00	FC Barcelona Intersport (Spain)	36 – 33	(Denmark) AG København	Palau Blaugrana, Blaugrana; Attendance: 5,300; Referees: Lazaar, Reveret (FRA)
28 April 2012; 20:00	Rutenka 9	(17–17)	Sigurðsson 8	Palau Blaugrana, Blaugrana; Attendance: 5,300; Referees: Lazaar, Reveret (FRA)
28 April 2012; 20:00	3× (yellow card)	Report	3× (yellow card) 3× (suspension)	Palau Blaugrana, Blaugrana; Attendance: 5,300; Referees: Lazaar, Reveret (FRA)

28 April 2012; 20:15	Atlético Madrid (Spain)	31 – 24	(Slovenia) RK Cimos Koper	Palacio Vistalegre, Madrid; Attendance: 10,500; Referees: Buy, Pichon (FRA)
28 April 2012; 20:15	Markussen 8	(14–13)	Brumen 7	Palacio Vistalegre, Madrid; Attendance: 10,500; Referees: Buy, Pichon (FRA)
28 April 2012; 20:15	3× (yellow card) 4× (suspension)	Report	3× (yellow card) 6× (suspension)	Palacio Vistalegre, Madrid; Attendance: 10,500; Referees: Buy, Pichon (FRA)

29 April 2012; 16:00	Füchse Berlin (Germany)	29 – 18	(Spain) CB Ademar León	Max-Schmeling-Halle, Berlin; Attendance: 8,900; Referees: Krstic, Ljubic (SLO)
29 April 2012; 16:00	Petersson 9	(13–6)	Andreu Candau, Garcia Robledo 4	Max-Schmeling-Halle, Berlin; Attendance: 8,900; Referees: Krstic, Ljubic (SLO)
29 April 2012; 16:00	3× (yellow card) 4× (suspension)	Report	3× (yellow card) 4× (suspension)	Max-Schmeling-Halle, Berlin; Attendance: 8,900; Referees: Krstic, Ljubic (SLO)

29 April 2012; 17:30	THW Kiel (Germany)	33 – 27	(Croatia) RK Zagreb	Sparkassen-Arena, Kiel; Attendance: 10,000; Referees: Dinu, Din (ROU)
29 April 2012; 17:30	Jícha 7	(16–16)	Štrlek 7	Sparkassen-Arena, Kiel; Attendance: 10,000; Referees: Dinu, Din (ROU)
29 April 2012; 17:30	3× (yellow card) 3× (suspension)	Report	3× (yellow card) 2× (suspension)	Sparkassen-Arena, Kiel; Attendance: 10,000; Referees: Dinu, Din (ROU)

== Final four ==
The semifinals and final were played in the Lanxess Arena at Cologne, Germany from May 26–27, 2012. The draw took place on May 2, 2012, in Cologne.

All times are UTC+2.

Semi-finals
26 May
(Germany) Füchse Berlin	24
(Germany) THW Kiel	25
26 May
(Spain) Atlético Madrid	25
(Denmark) AG København	23

Final
27 May
(Germany) THW Kiel	26
(Spain) Atlético Madrid	21
Third place
27 May
(Germany) Füchse Berlin	21
(Denmark) AG København	26

=== Semifinals ===
26 May 2012; 15:15	Füchse Berlin (Germany)	24 – 25	(Germany) THW Kiel	Lanxess Arena, Cologne; Attendance: 20,000; Referees: Abrahamsen, Kristiansen (NOR)
26 May 2012; 15:15	Petersson 7	(12–15)	Jícha 11	Lanxess Arena, Cologne; Attendance: 20,000; Referees: Abrahamsen, Kristiansen (NOR)
26 May 2012; 15:15	3× (yellow card) 4× (suspension)	Report	3× (yellow card) 4× (suspension)	Lanxess Arena, Cologne; Attendance: 20,000; Referees: Abrahamsen, Kristiansen (NOR)

26 May 2012; 18:00	Atlético Madrid (Spain)	25 – 23	(Denmark) AG København	Lanxess Arena, Cologne; Attendance: 20,000; Referees: Gubica, Milosevic (CRO)
26 May 2012; 18:00	Lazarov 11	(12–15)	Ekberg 5	Lanxess Arena, Cologne; Attendance: 20,000; Referees: Gubica, Milosevic (CRO)
26 May 2012; 18:00	3× (yellow card) 2× (suspension)	Report	3× (yellow card) 3× (suspension)	Lanxess Arena, Cologne; Attendance: 20,000; Referees: Gubica, Milosevic (CRO)

=== Third place game ===
27 May 2012; 15:15	Füchse Berlin (Germany)	21 – 26	(Denmark) AG København	Lanxess Arena, Cologne; Attendance: 20,000; Referees: Badura, Ondogrecula (SVK)
27 May 2012; 15:15	Pevnov 5	(9–13)	four players 4	Lanxess Arena, Cologne; Attendance: 20,000; Referees: Badura, Ondogrecula (SVK)
27 May 2012; 15:15	3× (yellow card) 3× (suspension)	Report	3× (yellow card) 4× (suspension)	Lanxess Arena, Cologne; Attendance: 20,000; Referees: Badura, Ondogrecula (SVK)

=== Final ===
27 May 2012; 18:00	THW Kiel (Germany)	26 – 21	(Spain) Atlético Madrid	Lanxess Arena, Cologne; Attendance: 20,000; Referees: Nikolic, Stojkovic (SRB)
27 May 2012; 18:00	Andersson 7	(13–10)	Lazarov 5	Lanxess Arena, Cologne; Attendance: 20,000; Referees: Nikolic, Stojkovic (SRB)
27 May 2012; 18:00	3× (yellow card) 7× (suspension)	Report	3× (yellow card) 8× (suspension) 1× (red card)	Lanxess Arena, Cologne; Attendance: 20,000; Referees: Nikolic, Stojkovic (SRB)
