= 2011–12 EHF Champions League =

European handball tournament

EHF Champions League
- 2011–12

Tournament information
- Sport: Handball
- Location: Lanxess Arena (FINAL4)
- Dates: 3 September 2011–27 May 2012
- Teams: 32 (qualification stage); 24 (group stage); 16 (knockout stage)

Final positions
- Champions: (Germany) THW Kiel (3rd title)
- Runner-up: (Spain) Atlético Madrid

Tournament statistics
- Matches played: 148
- Goals scored: 8248 (55.73 per match)
- Attendance: 727,150 (4,913 per match)
- Top scorer(s): (Denmark) Mikkel Hansen (98 goals)

The 2011–12 EHF Champions League was the 52nd edition of Europe's premier club handball tournament and the nineteenth edition under the current EHF Champions League format. FC Barcelona were the defending champions. The final four was played on 26–27 May 2012. For the third consecutive year it will be played at the Lanxess Arena in Cologne.

THW Kiel won the title for the third time after defeating Atlético Madrid 26–21 in the final.

== Overview ==
=== Team allocation ===
Group stage
(Bosnia and Herzegovina) RK Bosna Sarajevo	(Croatia) RK Zagreb	(Denmark) AG København	(Denmark) Bjerringbro-Silkeborg
(France) Chambéry Savoie Handball	(France) Montpellier HB	(Germany) Füchse Berlin	(Germany) HSV Hamburg
(Germany) THW Kiel	(Hungary) MKB Veszprém KC	(Hungary) SC Pick Szeged	(Poland) Orlen Wisła Płock
(Romania) HCM Constanța	(Russia) Chekhovskiye Medvedi	(Russia) St. Petersburg HC	(Slovenia) RK Koper
(Spain) Atlético Madrid	(Spain) CB Ademar León	(Spain) FC Barcelona	(Switzerland) Kadetten Schaffhausen
Qualification tournament
(Austria) Fivers Margareten	(Belarus) HC Dinamo-Minsk	(Greece) AEK Athens H.C.	(Iceland) FH Hafnarfjörður
(Israel) Maccabi Rishon LeZion	(North Macedonia) HC Metalurg	(Norway) Haslum HK	(Portugal) F.C. Porto
(Serbia) RK Partizan	(Slovakia) HT Tatran Prešov	(Sweden) IK Sävehof	(Turkey) Beşiktaş J.K.
Wild card tournament
(France) US Dunkerque HB	(Germany) Rhein-Neckar Löwen	(Poland) Vive Targi Kielce	(Spain) BM Valladolid

th Title Holder

=== Round and draw dates ===
Phase	Round	Draw date	First leg	Second leg
Qualifying	Qualification tournament	27 June 2011	3–4 September 2011	
Qualifying	Wild card tournament	27 June 2011	3–4 September 2011	
Group stage	Matchday 1	28 June 2011	28 September–2 October 2011	
Group stage	Matchday 2	28 June 2011	5–9 October 2011	
Group stage	Matchday 3	28 June 2011	12–16 October 2011	
Group stage	Matchday 4	28 June 2011	19–23 October 2011	
Group stage	Matchday 5	28 June 2011	16–20 November 2011	
Group stage	Matchday 6	28 June 2011	23–27 November 2011	
Group stage	Matchday 7	28 June 2011	30 November–4 December 2011	
Group stage	Matchday 8	28 June 2011	8–12 February 2012	
Group stage	Matchday 9	28 June 2011	15–19 February 2012	
Group stage	Matchday 10	28 June 2011	22–29 February 2012	
Knockout phase	Last 16	28 February 2012	14–18 March 2012	21–25 March 2012
Knockout phase	Quarterfinals	27 March 2012	18–22 April 2012	25–29 April 2012
Knockout phase	Final four	2 May 2012	26–27 May 2012	

== Qualification stage ==
=== Qualification tournament ===
A total of 12 teams took part in the qualification tournaments. The clubs were drawn into three groups of four and played a semifinal and the final. The winner of the qualification groups advanced to the group stage, while the eliminated clubs went to the EHF Cup. Matches were played at 3–4 September 2011.

=== Seedings ===
Pot 1	Pot 2	Pot 3	Pot 4
(Sweden) IK Sävehof (North Macedonia) HC Metalurg (Slovakia) HT Tatran Prešov	(Greece) AEK Athens H.C. (Iceland) FH Hafnarfjörður (Belarus) HC Dinamo-Minsk	(Norway) Haslum HK (Austria) Fivers Margareten (Serbia) RK Partizan	(Portugal) F.C. Porto (Turkey) Beşiktaş J.K. (Israel) Maccabi Rishon LeZion

=== Group 1 ===
The tournament was organised by the Slovakian club HT Tatran Prešov.

==== Bracket ====
Semi-finals
3 September 2011
(Slovakia) HT Tatran Prešov	28
(Portugal) F.C. Porto	29
3 September 2011
(Greece) AEK Athens H.C.	25
(Serbia) RK Partizan	26

Final
4 September 2011
(Portugal) F.C. Porto	26
(Serbia) RK Partizan	33
Third place
4 September 2011
(Slovakia) HT Tatran Prešov	40
(Greece) AEK Athens H.C.	23

==== Semifinals ====
3 September 2011; 15:30	AEK Athens H.C. (Greece)	25 – 26	(Serbia) RK Partizan	Mestská Hala Prešov, Prešov; Attendance: 900; Referees: Stolarovs, Licis (LAT)
3 September 2011; 15:30	Bakaoukas 8	(12–15)	Ilić 5	Mestská Hala Prešov, Prešov; Attendance: 900; Referees: Stolarovs, Licis (LAT)
3 September 2011; 15:30	2× (yellow card) 3× (suspension)	Report	3× (yellow card) 4× (suspension)	Mestská Hala Prešov, Prešov; Attendance: 900; Referees: Stolarovs, Licis (LAT)

3 September 2011; 18:00	HT Tatran Prešov (Slovakia)	28 – 29	(Portugal) F.C. Porto	Mestská Hala Prešov, Prešov; Attendance: 2,000; Referees: Johansson, Kliko (SWE)
3 September 2011; 18:00	Antl 6	(16–15)	Spinola 8	Mestská Hala Prešov, Prešov; Attendance: 2,000; Referees: Johansson, Kliko (SWE)
3 September 2011; 18:00	3× (yellow card) 4× (suspension)	Report	3× (yellow card) 5× (suspension)	Mestská Hala Prešov, Prešov; Attendance: 2,000; Referees: Johansson, Kliko (SWE)

==== Third place game ====
4 September 2011; 15:30	HT Tatran Prešov (Slovakia)	40 – 23	(Greece) AEK Athens H.C.	Mestská Hala Prešov, Prešov; Attendance: 1,000; Referees: Stolarovs, Licis (LAT)
4 September 2011; 15:30	Kristopans 8	(21–7)	Bakaoukas 8	Mestská Hala Prešov, Prešov; Attendance: 1,000; Referees: Stolarovs, Licis (LAT)
4 September 2011; 15:30	3× (yellow card) 5× (suspension)	Report	3× (yellow card) 10× (suspension)	Mestská Hala Prešov, Prešov; Attendance: 1,000; Referees: Stolarovs, Licis (LAT)

==== Final ====
4 September 2011; 18:00	F.C. Porto (Portugal)	26 – 33	(Serbia) RK Partizan	Mestská Hala Prešov, Prešov; Attendance: 600; Referees: Johansson, Kliko (SWE)
4 September 2011; 18:00	Moreira 10	(14–17)	Maksić 10	Mestská Hala Prešov, Prešov; Attendance: 600; Referees: Johansson, Kliko (SWE)
4 September 2011; 18:00	3× (yellow card) 2× (suspension) 1× (red card)	Report	3× (yellow card) 3× (suspension)	Mestská Hala Prešov, Prešov; Attendance: 600; Referees: Johansson, Kliko (SWE)

=== Group 2 ===
The tournament was organised by the Austrian club Fivers Margareten.

==== Bracket ====
Semi-finals
3 September 2011
(Sweden) IK Sävehof	34
(Turkey) Beşiktaş J.K.	28
3 September 2011
(Belarus) HC Dinamo-Minsk	32
(Austria) Fivers Margareten	23

Final
4 September 2011
(Sweden) IK Sävehof	33
(Belarus) HC Dinamo-Minsk	32
Third place
4 September 2011
(Turkey) Beşiktaş J.K.	37
(Austria) Fivers Margareten	33

==== Semifinals ====
3 September 2011; 17:45	IK Sävehof (Sweden)	34 – 28	(Turkey) Beşiktaş J.K.	Sporthalle Hollgasse, Vienna; Attendance: 300; Referees: Kekes, Kekes (HUN)
3 September 2011; 17:45	Berggren 8	(16–12)	Döne 13	Sporthalle Hollgasse, Vienna; Attendance: 300; Referees: Kekes, Kekes (HUN)
3 September 2011; 17:45	3× (yellow card) 3× (suspension)	Report	3× (yellow card) 3× (suspension)	Sporthalle Hollgasse, Vienna; Attendance: 300; Referees: Kekes, Kekes (HUN)

3 September 2011; 20:15	HC Dinamo-Minsk (Belarus)	32 – 23	(Austria) Fivers Margareten	Sporthalle Hollgasse, Vienna; Attendance: 900; Referees: Pandzic, Mosorinski (SRB)
3 September 2011; 20:15	Pukhouski 8	(14–13)	Kirveliavičius 7	Sporthalle Hollgasse, Vienna; Attendance: 900; Referees: Pandzic, Mosorinski (SRB)
3 September 2011; 20:15	3× (yellow card) 2× (suspension)	Report	3× (yellow card) 3× (suspension)	Sporthalle Hollgasse, Vienna; Attendance: 900; Referees: Pandzic, Mosorinski (SRB)

==== Third place game ====
4 September 2011; 16:30	Beşiktaş J.K. (Turkey)	37 – 33	(Austria) Fivers Margareten	Sporthalle Hollgasse, Vienna; Attendance: 500; Referees: Pandzic, Mosorinski (SRB)
4 September 2011; 16:30	Döne 14	(21–14)	Kirveliavičius 10	Sporthalle Hollgasse, Vienna; Attendance: 500; Referees: Pandzic, Mosorinski (SRB)
4 September 2011; 16:30	3× (yellow card) 8× (suspension)	Report	2× (yellow card) 5× (suspension)	Sporthalle Hollgasse, Vienna; Attendance: 500; Referees: Pandzic, Mosorinski (SRB)

==== Final ====
4 September 2011; 14:00	IK Sävehof (Sweden)	33 – 32	(Belarus) HC Dinamo-Minsk	Sporthalle Hollgasse, Vienna; Attendance: 300; Referees: Kekes, Kekes (HUN)
4 September 2011; 14:00	Berggren 9	(17–15)	Niazhura 6	Sporthalle Hollgasse, Vienna; Attendance: 300; Referees: Kekes, Kekes (HUN)
4 September 2011; 14:00	3× (yellow card) 1× (suspension)	Report	3× (yellow card) 3× (suspension)	Sporthalle Hollgasse, Vienna; Attendance: 300; Referees: Kekes, Kekes (HUN)

=== Group 3 ===
The tournament was organised by the Israeli club Maccabi Rishon LeZion.

==== Bracket ====
Semi-finals
3 September 2011
(Iceland) FH Hafnarfjörður	29
(Norway) Haslum HK	36
3 September 2011
(North Macedonia) HC Metalurg	27
(Israel) Maccabi Rishon LeZion	19

Final
4 September 2011
(Norway) Haslum HK	28
(North Macedonia) HC Metalurg	29
Third place
4 September 2011
(Iceland) FH Hafnarfjörður	42
(Israel) Maccabi Rishon LeZion	43

==== Semifinals ====
3 September 2011; 18:00	FH Hafnarfjörður (Iceland)	29 – 36	(Norway) Haslum HK	Maccabi Handball House, Rishon LeZion; Attendance: 1,000; Referees: Opava, Valek (CZE)
3 September 2011; 18:00	Gustafsson 7	(14–18)	Tönnesen 10	Maccabi Handball House, Rishon LeZion; Attendance: 1,000; Referees: Opava, Valek (CZE)
3 September 2011; 18:00	3× (yellow card) 2× (suspension)	Report	3× (yellow card) 5× (suspension)	Maccabi Handball House, Rishon LeZion; Attendance: 1,000; Referees: Opava, Valek (CZE)

3 September 2011; 20:30	HC Metalurg (North Macedonia)	27 – 19	(Israel) Maccabi Rishon LeZion	Maccabi Handball House, Rishon LeZion; Attendance: 1,150; Referees: Dentz, Reibel (FRA)
3 September 2011; 20:30	Marković, Rakčević 7	(13–7)	Pomeranz 6	Maccabi Handball House, Rishon LeZion; Attendance: 1,150; Referees: Dentz, Reibel (FRA)
3 September 2011; 20:30	3× (yellow card) 5× (suspension) 1× (red card)	Report	2× (yellow card) 9× (suspension)	Maccabi Handball House, Rishon LeZion; Attendance: 1,150; Referees: Dentz, Reibel (FRA)

==== Third place game ====
4 September 2011; 20:30	FH Hafnarfjörður (Iceland)	42 – 43	(Israel) Maccabi Rishon LeZion	Maccabi Handball House, Rishon LeZion; Attendance: 800; Referees: Dentz, Reibel (FRA)
4 September 2011; 20:30	Gustafsson 12	(17–17)	Pomeranz 11	Maccabi Handball House, Rishon LeZion; Attendance: 800; Referees: Dentz, Reibel (FRA)
4 September 2011; 20:30	2× (yellow card) 4× (suspension) 1× (red card)	Report	1× (yellow card) 7× (suspension)	Maccabi Handball House, Rishon LeZion; Attendance: 800; Referees: Dentz, Reibel (FRA)

==== Final ====
4 September 2011; 18:88	Haslum HK (Norway)	28 – 29	(North Macedonia) HC Metalurg	Maccabi Handball House, Rishon LeZion; Attendance: 600; Referees: Opava, Valek (CZE)
4 September 2011; 18:88	Koren 7	(9–14)	Marković 11	Maccabi Handball House, Rishon LeZion; Attendance: 600; Referees: Opava, Valek (CZE)
4 September 2011; 18:88	3× (yellow card) 6× (suspension)	Report	3× (yellow card) 4× (suspension)	Maccabi Handball House, Rishon LeZion; Attendance: 600; Referees: Opava, Valek (CZE)

=== Wild card tournament ===
Initially five teams applied for the four tournament places and following the decision of the European Handball Federation the request from the Danish Handball Association for Skjern Handbold was rejected. The clubs were drawn together automatically according to their league coefficient and decided the winner of the tournament using a final four system. Only the victorious team advanced to the Champions League group stage, while the losing sides continued their European adventure in the EHF Cup. The tournament was held at 3–4 September 2011, and was organized by Vive Targi Kielce.

==== Bracket ====
Semi-finals
3 September 2011
(Spain) BM Valladolid	19
(Poland) Vive Targi Kielce	21
3 September 2011
(Germany) Rhein-Neckar Löwen	36
(France) US Dunkerque HB	30

Final
4 September 2011
(Poland) Vive Targi Kielce	32
(Germany) Rhein-Neckar Löwen	30
Third place
4 September 2011
(Spain) BM Valladolid	23
(France) US Dunkerque HB	27

==== Semifinals ====
3 September 2011; 15:30	Rhein-Neckar Löwen (Germany)	36 – 30	(France) US Dunkerque HB	Hala Legionów, Kielce; Attendance: 2,000; Referees: Gubica, Milosevic (CRO)
3 September 2011; 15:30	Gensheimer 12	(15–17)	Nagy 7	Hala Legionów, Kielce; Attendance: 2,000; Referees: Gubica, Milosevic (CRO)
3 September 2011; 15:30	2× (yellow card) 4× (suspension)	Report	2× (yellow card) 2× (suspension)	Hala Legionów, Kielce; Attendance: 2,000; Referees: Gubica, Milosevic (CRO)

3 September 2011; 18:00	BM Valladolid (Spain)	19 – 21	(Poland) Vive Targi Kielce	Hala Legionów, Kielce; Attendance: 4,000; Referees: Brunovsky, Canda (SVK)
3 September 2011; 18:00	Rodriguez Perdiguero 5	(8–11)	Jurecki 5	Hala Legionów, Kielce; Attendance: 4,000; Referees: Brunovsky, Canda (SVK)
3 September 2011; 18:00	3× (yellow card) 1× (suspension)	Report	3× (yellow card) 5× (suspension)	Hala Legionów, Kielce; Attendance: 4,000; Referees: Brunovsky, Canda (SVK)

==== Third place game ====
4 September 2011; 15:30	US Dunkerque HB (France)	27 – 23	(Spain) BM Valladolid	Hala Legionów, Kielce; Attendance: 4,000; Referees: Brunovsky, Canda (SVK)
4 September 2011; 15:30	Soudry 9	(16–9)	Rodriguez Perdiguero 8	Hala Legionów, Kielce; Attendance: 4,000; Referees: Brunovsky, Canda (SVK)
4 September 2011; 15:30	3× (yellow card) 2× (suspension)	Raport	2× (yellow card) 1× (suspension)	Hala Legionów, Kielce; Attendance: 4,000; Referees: Brunovsky, Canda (SVK)

==== Final ====
4 September 2011; 18:00	Rhein-Neckar Löwen (Germany)	30 – 32	(Poland) Vive Targi Kielce	Hala Legionów, Kielce; Attendance: 4,000; Referees: Gubica, Milosevic (CRO)
4 September 2011; 18:00	Gensheimer 10	(11–13)	Buntić, Tomczak 6	Hala Legionów, Kielce; Attendance: 4,000; Referees: Gubica, Milosevic (CRO)
4 September 2011; 18:00	3× (yellow card) 5× (suspension)	Raport	2× (yellow card) 3× (suspension)	Hala Legionów, Kielce; Attendance: 4,000; Referees: Gubica, Milosevic (CRO)

== Group stage ==
The draw for the group stage took place at the Gartenhotel Altmannsdorf in Vienna on 28 June 2011 at 11:00 local time. A total of 24 teams were drawn into four groups of six. Teams were divided into six pots, based on EHF coefficients. Clubs from the same pot or the same association could not be drawn into the same group, except the wild card tournament winner, which did not enjoy any protection.

=== Seedings ===
Pot 1	Pot 2	Pot 3	Pot 4	Pot 5	Pot 6
(Spain) FC Barcelona (Germany) Hamburg (Russia) Chekhovskiye Medvedi (France) Montpellier	(Hungary) MKB Veszprém KC (Croatia) RK Zagreb (Denmark) AG København (Slovenia) RK Koper	(Spain) Atlético Madrid (Germany) THW Kiel (Romania) HCM Constanța (Switzerland) Kadetten Schaffhausen	(Russia) St. Petersburg HC (France) Chambéry Savoie HB (Spain) CB Ademar León (Germany) Füchse Berlin	(Hungary) SC Pick Szeged (Denmark) Bjerringbro-Silkeborg (Bosnia and Herzegovina) Bosna Sarajevo (Poland) Orlen Wisła Płock	(Serbia) Partizan (Sweden) IK Sävehof (North Macedonia) HC Metalurg (Poland) Vive Targi Kielce (WC)

=== Group A ===
Pos	Team	Pld	W	D	L	GF	GA	GD	Pts	FCB	RKZ	IKS	SCH	CSH	RKS
1	(Spain) FC Barcelona Intersport	10	9	0	1	336	245	+91	18	—	29–30	36–24	33–29	28–25	37–19
2	(Croatia) RK Zagreb	10	8	0	2	289	255	+34	16	30–31	—	30–26	31–28	28–20	33–19
3	(Sweden) IK Sävehof	10	5	0	5	291	300	−9	10	26–39	28–25	—	31–25	32–31	24–20
4	(Switzerland) Kadetten Schaffhausen	10	4	0	6	309	283	+26	8	26–30	27–28	40–32	—	28–24	43–18
5	(France) Chambéry Savoie HB	10	4	0	6	276	270	+6	8	19–30	26–28	33–30	33–29	—	40–19
6	(Bosnia and Herzegovina) RK Bosna Sarajevo	10	0	0	10	195	343	−148	0	17–43	21–26	21–38	23–34	18–25	—

=== Group B ===
Pos	Team	Pld	W	D	L	GF	GA	GD	Pts	BMN	MKB	VTK	FÜB	CHM	BJS
1	(Spain) Atlético Madrid	10	7	2	1	318	285	+33	16	—	37–28	28–27	32–27	30–30	31–27
2	(Hungary) MKB Veszprém KC	10	6	0	4	266	266	0	12	28–27	—	21–24	24–33	24–22	32–25
3	(Poland) Vive Targi Kielce	10	5	1	4	295	285	+10	11	29–37	25–29	—	32–29	26–26	37–29
4	(Germany) Füchse Berlin	10	5	1	4	296	292	+4	11	33–37	24–29	30–27	—	31–28	28–27
5	(Russia) Chekhovskiye Medvedi	10	3	4	3	291	276	+15	10	29–29	30–26	30–31	31–31	—	30–23
6	(Denmark) Bjerringbro-Silkeborg	10	0	0	10	253	315	−62	0	27–30	19–25	26–37	25–30	25–35	—

=== Group C ===
Pos	Team	Pld	W	D	L	GF	GA	GD	Pts	HSV	RKK	MET	OWP	STP	HCM
1	(Germany) HSV Hamburg	10	9	1	0	310	245	+65	19	—	27–27	32–25	34–25	32–20	36–25
2	(Slovenia) RK Koper	10	5	3	2	267	248	+19	13	23–24	—	22–22	27–24	30–23	28–24
3	(North Macedonia) RK Metalurg Skopje	10	5	2	3	254	231	+23	12	23–25	28–23	—	31–27	32–19	25–18
4	(Poland) Wisła Płock	10	4	1	5	273	269	+4	9	26–30	25–25	20–24	—	30–26	30–29
5	(Russia) St. Petersburg HC	10	2	1	7	241	301	−60	5	25–36	26–35	25–25	24–32	—	27–25
6	(Romania) HCM Constanța	10	1	0	9	235	286	−51	2	26–34	25–27	20–19	19–34	24–26	—

=== Group D ===
Pos	Team	Pld	W	D	L	GF	GA	GD	Pts	THW	AGK	CBL	MAH	SCP	RKP
1	(Germany) THW Kiel	10	7	2	1	318	263	+55	16	—	28–26	38–28	23–24	34–24	36–28
2	(Denmark) AG København	10	7	1	2	298	268	+30	15	24–24	—	30–29	31–29	36–24	29–23
3	(Spain) CB Ademar León	10	6	1	3	302	296	+6	13	28–28	28–26	—	29–28	31–25	33–28
4	(France) Montpellier HB	10	5	0	5	307	293	+14	10	31–34	27–31	38–34	—	29–26	36–27
5	(Hungary) SC Pick Szeged	10	3	0	7	285	316	−31	6	26–38	31–34	31–35	38–35	—	31–21
6	(Serbia) RK Partizan	10	0	0	10	243	317	−74	0	24–35	25–31	24–27	20–30	23–29	—

== Knockout stage ==
=== Last 16 ===
==== Seedings ====
Group	Pot 1	Pot 2	Pot 3	Pot 4
A	(Spain) FC Barcelona	(Croatia) RK Zagreb	(Sweden) IK Sävehof	(Switzerland) Kadetten Schaffhausen
B	(Spain) Atlético Madrid	(Hungary) MKB Veszprém KC	(Poland) Vive Targi Kielce	(Germany) Füchse Berlin
C	(Germany) Hamburg	(Slovenia) RK Koper	(North Macedonia) Metalurg	(Poland) Orlen Wisła Płock
D	(Germany) THW Kiel	(Denmark) AG København	(Spain) CB Ademar León	(France) Montpellier HB

==== Matches ====
The draw was held on 28 February 2012 at 11:00 in Hørsholm, Denmark. The first legs will be played on 14–18 March, and the second legs will be played on 21–25 March 2012.

Team #1	Agg.	Team #2	1st match	2nd match
Füchse Berlin (Germany)	56–53	(Germany) HSV Hamburg	32–30	24–23
Montpellier HB (France)	50–64	(Spain) FC Barcelona	30–28	20–36
Orlen Wisła Płock (Poland)	48–63	(Germany) THW Kiel	24–36	24–27
Kadetten Schaffhausen (Switzerland)	57–62	(Spain) Atlético Madrid	27–36	30–26
CB Ademar León (Spain)	56–55	(Hungary) MKB Veszprém KC	31–28	25–27
Vive Targi Kielce (Poland)	50–51	(Slovenia) RK Koper	27–26	23–25
HC Metalurg (North Macedonia)	40–44	(Croatia) RK Zagreb	19–18	21–26
IK Sävehof (Sweden)	49–60	(Denmark) AG København	25–34	24–26

=== Quarterfinals ===
==== Seedings ====
The draw was held on 27 March 2012 at 11:30 local time in Vienna. The first legs were played on 18–22 April, and the second legs were played on 25–29 April 2012.

Pot 1	Pot 2
(Spain) FC Barcelona (Germany) THW Kiel (Spain) Atlético Madrid (Germany) Füchse Berlin	(Spain) CB Ademar León (Denmark) AG København (Slovenia) RK Koper (Croatia) RK Zagreb

==== Matches ====
Team #1	Agg.	Team #2	1st match	2nd match
AG København (Denmark)	62–59	(Spain) FC Barcelona	29–23	33–36
CB Ademar León (Spain)	52–52	(Germany) Füchse Berlin	34–23	18–29
RK Zagreb (Croatia)	58–64	(Germany) THW Kiel	31–31	27–33
RK Koper (Slovenia)	50–54	(Spain) Atlético Madrid	26–23	24–31

=== Final four ===
The semifinals was played on 26 May 2012. The third place game and the final was played on 27 May 2012 in the Lanxess Arena at Cologne, Germany. The draw was held on May 2, 2012 in Cologne.

Semi-finals
26 May
(Germany) Füchse Berlin	24
(Germany) THW Kiel	25
26 May
(Spain) Atlético Madrid	25
(Denmark) AG København	23

Final
27 May
(Germany) THW Kiel	26
(Spain) Atlético Madrid	21
Third place
27 May
(Germany) Füchse Berlin	21
(Denmark) AG København	26

== Top scorers ==
Final statistics

Rank	Name	Team	Goals
1	Mikkel Hansen (DEN)	(Denmark) AG København	98
2	Kiril Lazarov (MKD)	(Spain) Atletico Madrid	97
3	Zlatko Horvat (CRO)	(Croatia) RK Zagreb	94
3	Filip Jícha (CZE)	(Germany) THW Kiel	94
5	Niclas Ekberg (SWE)	(Denmark) AG København	84
6	Guðjón Valur Sigurðsson (ISL)	(Denmark) AG København	83
7	Sven-Sören Christophersen (GER)	(Germany) Füchse Berlin	81
8	Martin Straňovský (SVK)	(Spain) CB Ademar León	80
9	Marko Vujin (SRB)	(Hungary) MKB Veszprém KC	73
10	Naumče Mojsovski (MKD)	(North Macedonia) HC Metalurg	72

== See also ==
- 2011–12 EHF Champions League group stage
- 2011–12 EHF Champions League knockout stage
- 2011–12 Women's EHF Champions League
- EHF Champions League
