= Friends Forever (1987 film) =

- Danish: Venner for altid
- Directed by: Stefan Henszelman
- Written by: Stefan Henszelman; Alexander Korschen
- Produced by: Jens Ravn
- Starring: Claus Bender Mortensen; Thomas Sigsgaard; Rita Angela; Carsten Morch; Lilla Nielsen; Lars Kylmann Jacobsen; Rasmus Bay Barlby; Morten Stig Christensen; Lill Lindfors
- Cinematography: Marcel Berga
- Edited by: Stefan Henszelman; Camilla Skousen
- Music by: Kim Sagild; Christian Skeel; Morti Vizki
- Release date: February 6, 1987
- Running time: 95 minutes
- Country: Denmark
- Language: Danish

Friends Forever (Danish: Venner for altid, lit. "Friends for All Time") is a Danish film produced in 1986 and released at the beginning of 1987. It was directed by Stefan Henszelman to a script by himself and Alexander Kørschen, was shown to large audiences in New York City, Washington, D.C., and San Francisco and garnered the 1988 Audience Award at the San Francisco International Lesbian & Gay Film Festival.

The film was successfully shown at the 2005 Copenhagen Gay and Lesbian Film Festival by its Danish distributor, Nordisk.

Henszelman lived to direct one more film, Dagens Donna (1990). He died of AIDS on October 2, 1991, aged 31.

== Plot ==
Teenager Kristian Malmquist moves to a new neighborhood and makes friends with two boys in his new school: Henrik, an independent loner, and Patrick, leader of a gang. Later on, Kristian is startled to find Patrick is having an affair with the captain of a soccer team and this leads him to explore his own feelings.

== Cast ==
- Rita Angela as Rektor Kallenbach
- Carsten Morch as Dan Carstensen
- Lars Kylmann Jacobsen as Anders
- Trine Torp Hansen as Berit
- Thomas Sigsgaard as Patrick
- Christine Skou as Sophie
- Claus Bender Mortensen as Kristian
- Morten Stig Christensen as Mads
- Mika Heilmann as Medlem af band
- Thomas Elholm as Henrik

Unnamed;

- Lilla Nielsen
- Rasmus Bay Barlby
- Christian Kamienski
- Claus Steenstrup Nielsen
- Christian Adam Garnov
