= Morten Stig Christensen =

Danish handball player (1958–2024)

Morten Stig Christensen (Denmark)

President of Danish Handball Federation
- In office 30 August 2021 – 1 November 2024
- Preceded by: Per Bertelsen
- Succeeded by: Torsten Laen

Personal details
- Born: 27 December 1958 Hjørring, Denmark
- Died: 1 November 2024 (aged 65)
- Spouse: Anne Engdal Stig Christensen
- Education: Teacher
- Alma mater: N. Zahles Seminarium
- Profession: Sports administrator, handball player
- Awards: Danish Handballer of the Year (1984), EHF Honorary Award
- Handball career
- Height: 192 cm (76 in)
- Sport: Handball
- Position: Back

Senior clubs
- Years: Team
- –: MK31
- –: SAGA
- –: Gladsaxe HG
- –: Stavanger ( (Norway) )
- –: Tarup-Paarup IF
National team
| Years | Team | Apps | (Gls) |
| 1976-1988 | Denmark | 190 | (445) |

Morten Stig Christensen (27 December 1958 – 1 November 2024) was a Danish handball player, handball official and television presenter. From 2021 until his death in 2024 he was the president of the Danish Handball Federation. In 2024 he was posthomously awarded the EHF's honorary award. In 2005 he received the Order of the Dannebrog.

== Playing career ==
He played at club level for SAGA. In 1984 he was named Danish handballer of the year. He played 190 matches for Denmark and scored 445 goals between 1976 and 1988. In 1976 he was a squad member of the Danish team which finished eighth in the Olympic tournament. He was a reserve player and did not play in a match. Four years later, he finished ninth with the Danish team in the 1980 Olympic tournament. He played four matches and scored two goals. In 1984 he was part of the Danish team which finished fourth in the Olympic tournament. He played all six matches and scored 14 goals. He also represented Denmark at three world cups in 1978, 1982 and 1986.

== Post-playing career ==
After his handball career finished, Christensen began acting, appearing in Friends Forever in 1986 and an episode of Anna Pihl in 2006.

Christensen was involved with left-wing politics before becoming more moderate.

He presented on sports programmes on TV 2, including TV 2 Sporten.

== Private ==
He was married to TV2 Danmark's administrative director Anna Engdal Stig Christensen.

Christensen died of a cardiac arrest on 1 November 2024, at the age of 65.
