= Boštjan Kavaš =

Slovenian handball player

Personal information
- Nationality: Slovenian
- Born: 13 September 1978 (age 48) Murska Sobota
- Height: 1.91 m (6 ft 3 in)

Sport
- Sport: Handball
- Position: Right back

Boštjan Kavaš (born 13 September 1978) is a professional handball player.

== Career ==
Kavaš has played for several clubs in the course of his career: Bakovci (1992–1996), RK Gorenje (1996–2000), RK Prevent (2000–03), RK Trimo Trebnje (2003–05), RK Gorenje (2005–2010 ), and Wisła Płock.
