= Torsten Laen =

Danish handball player (born 1979)

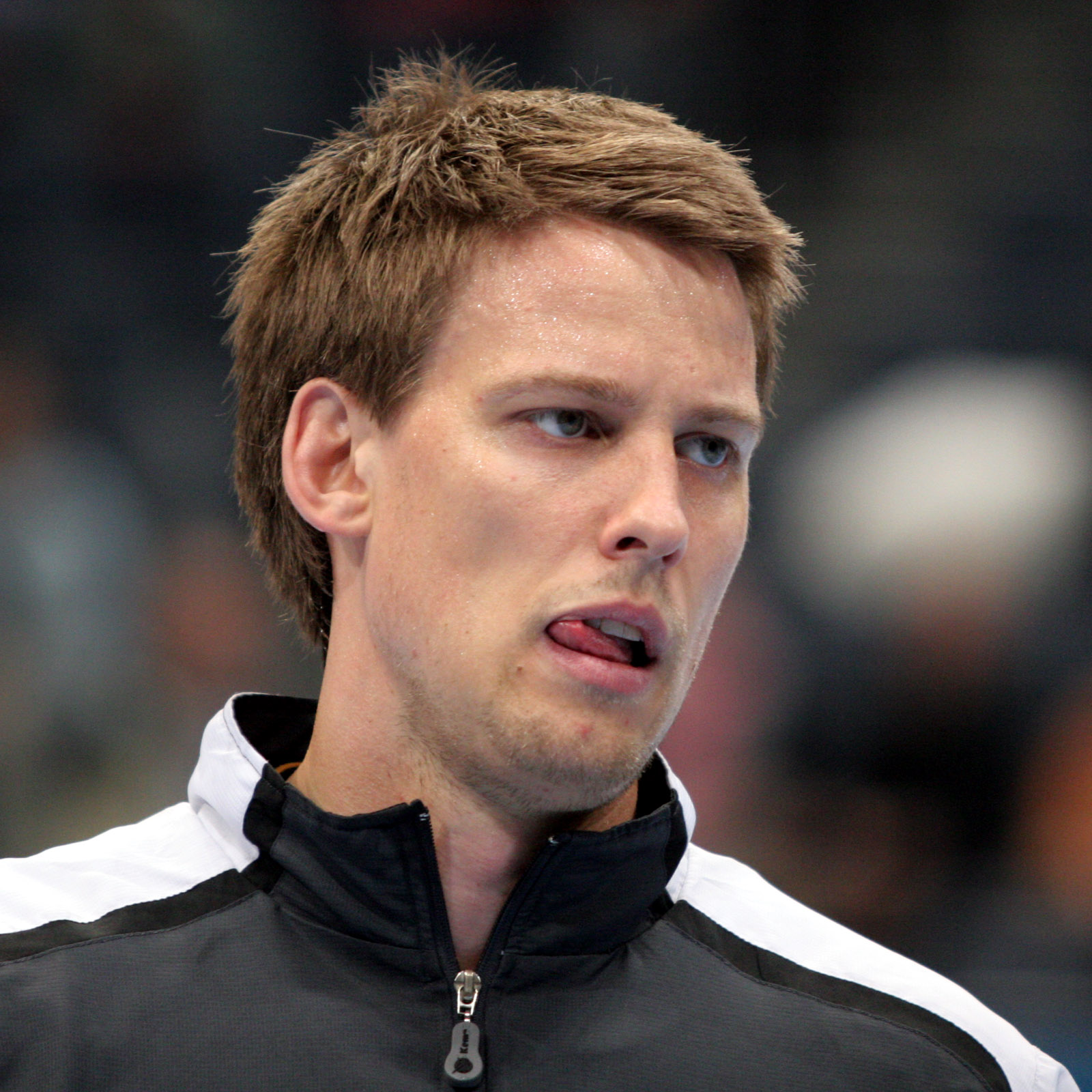
- Torsten Laen in Kölnarena, 20 February 2008

Personal information
- Nationality: Danish
- Born: 26 November 1979 (age 46) Odense, Denmark
- Height: 1.98 m (6 ft 6 in)

Sport
- Sport: Handball
- Position: Pivot
- Number: 2

Senior clubs
- Years: Team
- 1999–2007: GOG
- 2007–2009: BM Ciudad Real
- 2009–2013: Füchse Berlin
- 2013–2016: KIF Kolding København
- 2016–2018: GOG
National team
Years	Team	Apps	(Gls)
1999–2018	Denmark	152	(257)
Medal record
Representing Denmark
Men's handball
European Championships
Bronze medal – third place	2002 Sweden	Team competition
Bronze medal – third place	2004 Slovenia	Team competition
Junior World Championship
Gold medal – first place	1999 Qatar	Team

Torsten Laen (born 26 November 1979) is a Danish team handball administrator and former player. He is currently serving as the chairperson of the Danish Handball Federation. His last club was the Danish club GOG. Laen has been a part of the Danish national handball team, winning medals in 2002 and 2004.

After his playing Career Torsten Laen has been involved in the Danish handball player labour union, Håndbold Spillerforeningen. He has also been the ambassador at Kolding Handicap Idræt, an organisation for handicap sports in Kolding, Denmark.

In June 2025 he was appointed the chairperson of the Danish Handball Federation following the death of former chairperson Morten Stig Christensen.

== Honours ==
- EHF Champions League: 2
  - Gold: 2008, 2009
- Spanish Championship: 2
  - Gold: 2008, 2009
- Danish Championship: 5
  - Gold: 2000, 2004, 2007, 2014, 2015
- Danish Handball Cup: 4
  - Gold: 2002, 2003, 2005, 2013
