= Matjaž Brumen =

Slovenian handball player

Personal information
- Nationality: Slovenian
- Born: 23 December 1982 (age 43) Ljubljana, SFR Yugoslavia
- Height: 1.90 m (6 ft 3 in)

Sport
- Sport: Handball
- Position: Right wing
- Current club: RD Izola
- Number: 7

Senior clubs
- Years: Team
- 1999–2003: (Slovenia) RD Prule 67
- 2003–2007: (Slovenia) RK Celje
- 2007–2013: (Slovenia) RK Koper
- 2013–2016: (North Macedonia) RK Vardar
- 2016–2018: (Slovenia) RK Gorenje Velenje
- 2018: (Croatia) RK Nexe
- 2018–2020: (Slovenia) RD Izola
- 2020–2021: (Slovenia) RD Slovan
- 2021–: (Slovenia) RD Izola
National team
Years	Team	Apps	(Gls)
–	Slovenia	131	(358)
Medal record
European Championship
Silver medal – second place	2004 Slovenia

Matjaž Brumen (born 1982) is a Slovenian handball player who plays for RD Izola. He was born in Ljubljana. He won silver medals at the 2004 European Championship at home soil, which is Slovenia's best result ever. He also competed at the 2004 Summer Olympics in Athens, where the Slovenian team placed 11th.

In 2003 he was banned for four months, following a positive doping test.
