= Michał Kubisztal =

Polish handball player (born 1980)

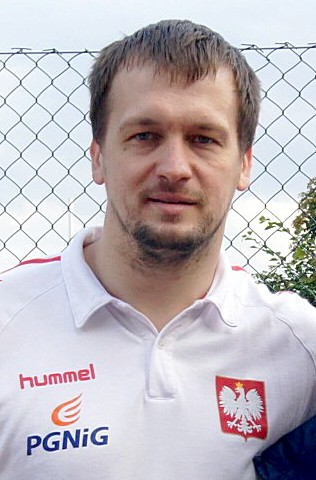

Personal information
- Nationality: Polish
- Born: 23 March 1980 (age 46) Tarnów, Poland
- Height: 1.94 m (6 ft 4 in)

Sport
- Sport: Handball
- Position: Left back
- Current club: Czuwaj Przemyśl
- Number: 11
National team
Years	Team	Apps	(Gls)
2003–2015	Poland	55	(177)

Michał Kubisztal (born 23 March 1980) is a Polish handball player for Czuwaj Przemyśl and a retired Polish national team player.
