= Hala Legionów =

Sport hall in Kielce

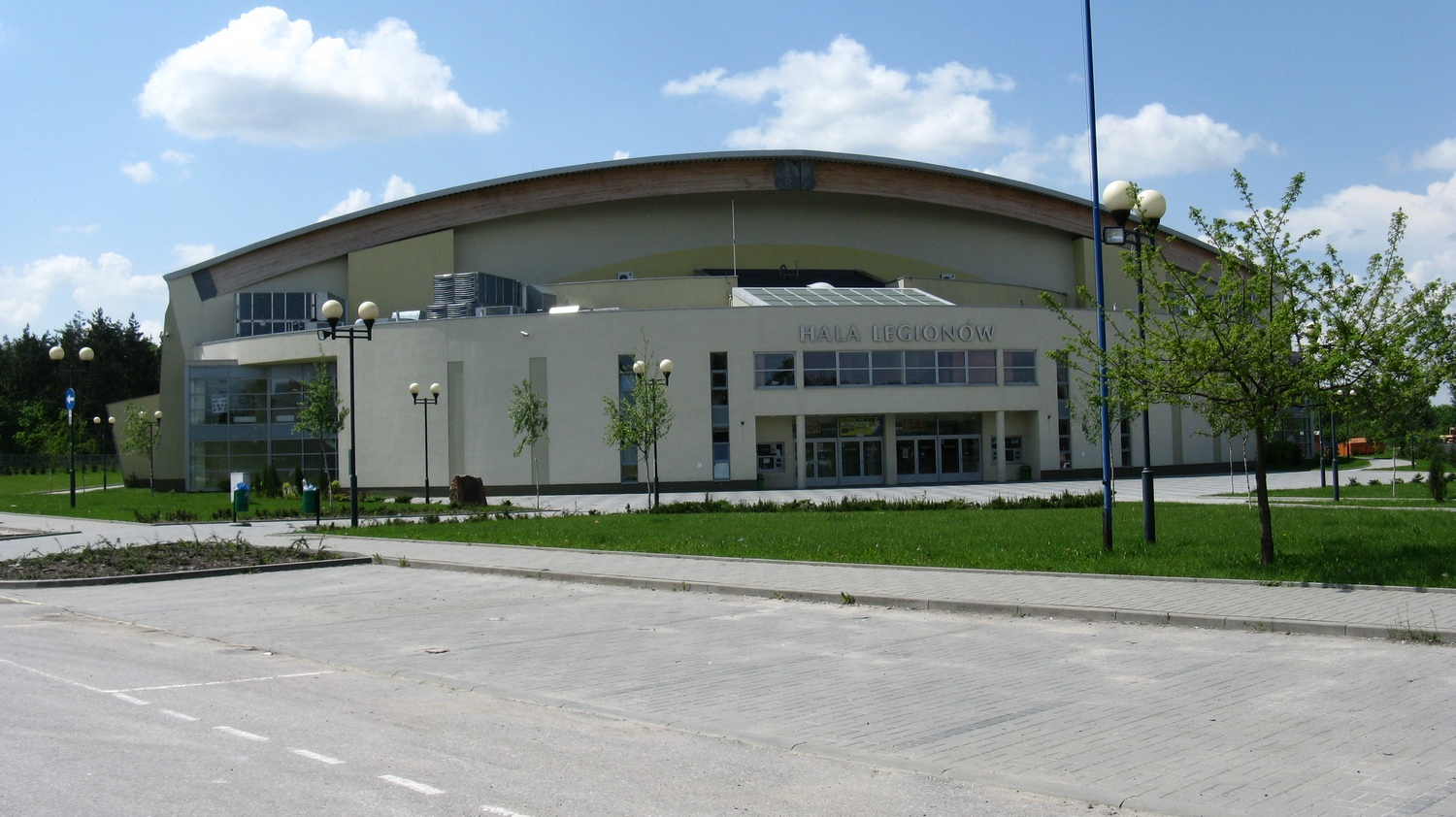
- Interactive map of Hala Legionów
- Location: Kielce, Poland
- Coordinates: 50.8561564°N 20.6087743°E
- Owner: City of Kielce
- Operator: MOSiR Kielce
- Capacity: 3,030 (permanent); 1,170 (additional); 4,200 (total seats)
- Surface: Parquet
- Field size: 55 m x 38 m

Construction
- Groundbreaking: 11 April 2005; 21 years ago
- Built: 2005–2006
- Opened: 25 August 2006; 20 years ago
- Cost: PLN 27.5 million
- Architects: Biuro Obsługi Inwestycji; Pracownia Detan
- General contractor: Budimex Dromex SA

Tenant
- Vive Kielce (2006–)

Hala Legionów in Kielce is a multi-purpose sports facility, opened on 25 August 2006. Its most popular tenant is the Polish handball club, Vive Kielce. Hala Legionów has 3,030 permanent and 1,170 additional seats, totaling 4,200 of maximum capacity.
