= Israel Handball Association =

Governing body of handball in Israel

Israel Handball Association Hebrew: איגוד הכדוריד בישראל IHA
- IOC nation: Israel (ISR)
- Sport: Handball
- Other sports: Beach handball
- Official website: www.handballisr.co.il

HISTORY
- Year of formation: 1955; 71 years ago

AFFILIATIONS
- International federation: International Handball Federation (IHF)
- IHF member since: 1996
- Continental association: European Handball Federation
- National Olympic Committee: Olympic Committee of Israel

GOVERNING BODY
- President: Tal Lavi

HEADQUARTERS
- Address: Shitrit St. 6, Hadar-Josep, 61240 Tel Aviv
- Country: Israel
- Secretary General: Arik Deutch

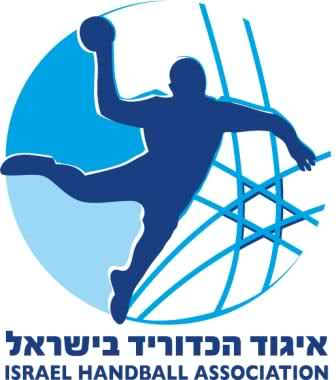
Israeli Handball Association logo

The Israel Handball Association (Hebrew: איגוד הכדוריד בישראל) (IHA) is the administrative and controlling body for handball and beach handball in Israel. Founded in 1955, IHA is a member of European Handball Federation (EHF) and the International Handball Federation (IHF).

== National teams ==
- Israel men's national handball team
- Israel men's national junior handball team
- Israel women's national handball team

== Competitions ==
- Ligat Ha'Al
- Liga Leumit
- Liga Artzit

== Affiliated clubs ==
Following is the list of clubs affiliated with Israel Handball Association (as of July 2020):

- HC Nes Ziona
- Hapoel Ramat Gan
- Ramat Hasharon HC
- ASA Tel Aviv
- Bnei Herzliya
- Handball Club Holon
- Hapoel Rishon LeZion
- Maccabi Rishon LeZion
- Hapoel Ashdod
- Maccabi Avishai Motzkin
- Maccabi Rehovot
- Maccabi Tel Aviv
