= Deki =

Deki may refer to:

- DekiWiki, a former wiki developed by MindTouch
- Deki, a nickname for Dejan, a Slavic masculine name
  - Dejan Kulusevski (born 2000), a Swedish professional footballer
- Deki Lhazom (born 2004), Bhutanese footballer

== See also ==
- DeKi 300, several electric locomotives with that name
