= Aharon Doron =

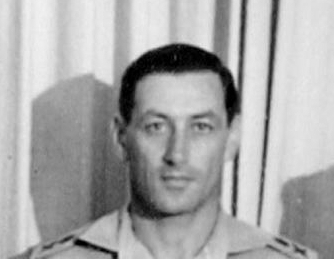
- Native name: אהרון דורון
- Born: February 17, 1922; Ludwigshafen, Germany
- Died: December 14, 2016 (aged 94)
- Allegiance: Israel
- Branch: Haganah; Israel Defense Forces; Jewish Settlement Police
- Service years: 1939-1963
- Rank: Aluf
- Commands: Battalion commander of Givati Brigade; Battalion commander of Yiftach Brigade; Battalion commander of Golani Brigade; Battalion commander of Nahal Brigade; Head of the Manpower Directorate, April 1961 – July 1963
- Conflicts: 1948 Arab–Israeli War; Sinai War
- Other work: Director of Beit Hatfutsot; Vice President of Tel Aviv University; Chairman of the Israel Sports Association; Chairman of the Friends of the Israel Defense Forces; Office of the Ombudsman
- Sports career
- Education: Columbia University
- Sport: Handball, Soccer
- Handball: Israeli Handball League
- Team: Hapoel Haifa F.C.; Hapoel Petah Tikva; Hapoel Tel Aviv F.C.

Aharon Doron (Hebrew: אהרון דורון; February 17, 1922 – December 14, 2016) was a major general in the Israel Defense Forces and an educator. He served as the head of the Manpower Directorate under the General Staff from April 1961 to July 1963. After his release from the military, Doron held various positions at the University of Tel Aviv and Israeli sports associations. In 1992 he was appointed military ombudsman by the late Prime Minister Yitzhak Rabin.

== Biography ==
Aharon Doron was born in Ludwigshafen, Germany to Erwin and Iloimer. His parents engaged in the tobacco trade. Doron immigrated to Palestine in 1939 in the framework of Youth Aliyah. After graduating from "Ludwig Tietz", a vocational school, he joined Kibbutz Yagur. He served as a commander in the Haganah. In 1941 he became a Notar in the Jewish Settlement Police and played professional football for Hapoel Haifa. Later, he played handball for Hapoel Petah Tikva and Hapoel Tel Aviv.

Upon his release from the IDF, Doron earned an MBA in business administration from Columbia University.

In 2007 Doron was struck by a car while crossing a road, leaving him with a severe shoulder injury. He died in December 2016 at the age of 94.

== Military career ==
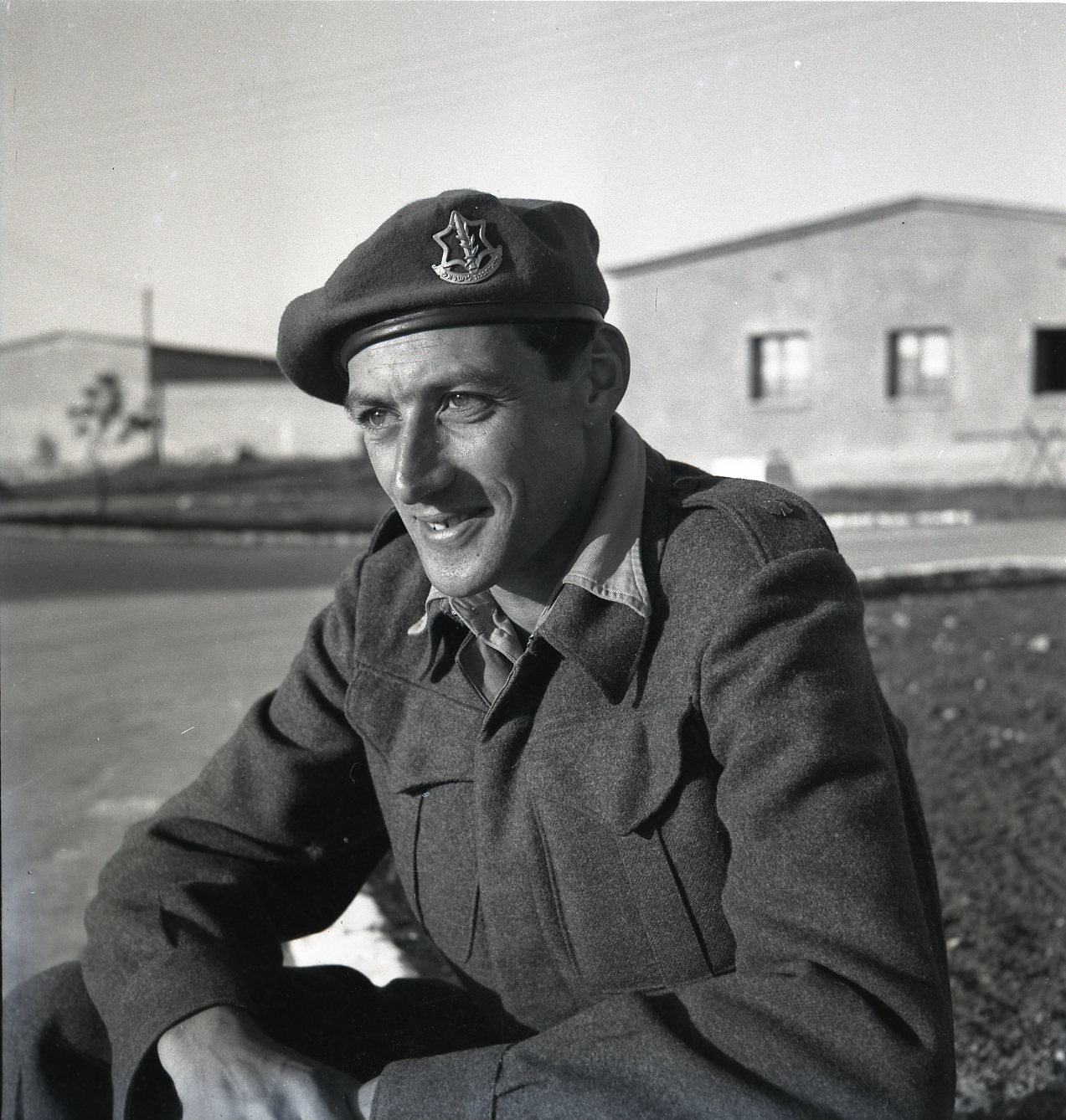
Aharon Doron

Doron was involved in various operations to secure transportation routes in the north during the Battle of Haifa. During the 1948 Arab–Israeli War, Doron was the commander of Camp Dotan (Camp 80), a training camp for newly enlisted high school graduate students. After the war he commanded the Battalion Commanders School of Nahal. In 1952 he was appointed battalion commander of the Givati Brigade.

In February 1954 he was appointed commander of the Nahal Command, a position he held until October 1955. During the Sinai War he commanded the Yiftach Brigade (11th Brigade) to the occupation of Gaza. After the war, Doron left for a training school for senior officers in England. In 1957 he was appointed commander of the Golani Brigade and in 1958 was appointed head of the faculty. From 1959 until he was released from the military in 1963, he served as the head of the Manpower Directorate.

== Public service career ==
Doron held various positions in the Jewish Agency for Israel and the United Jewish Appeal. He later became the director of Beit Hatfutsot and later the Vice President of Tel Aviv University.

Between 1966 and 1970 he served on the Israel Athletic Commission. He later became the Chairman of the Israel Sports Association for six years.

In the days leading up to the Six-Day War, Doron headed the Emergency Committee of the Municipality of Tel Aviv which organized the city's civil defense. In 1979 he was elected chairman of the Friends of the Israel Defense Forces.
