= Doder =

Doder is a surname. Notable people with this surname include:

- Dalibor Doder (born 1979), Serbian handball player
- Dusko Doder (1937–2024), American journalist
- Tihomir Doder (born 1979), Serbian handball player

== See also ==
- Josh Doder, pseudonym of British writer Josh Lacey
