= Dejanović (surname) =

Dejanović (Serbian Cyrillic: Дејановић) is a Serbian surname derived from the male given name Dejan. Notable people with the surname include:

- Dejanović noble family, a Serbian noble family prominent in the 14th century
- Darko Dejanovic (born 1970), American businessman
- Darko Dejanović (born 1995), Serbian football goalkeeper
- Peđa Dejanović (born 1982), Bosnian handball goalkeeper
- Slavica Đukić Dejanović (born 1951), Serbian politician, current Minister of Health in the Government of Serbia
