= Milorad Krivokapić =

Milorad Krivokapić may refer to:

- Milorad Krivokapić (handballer) (born 1980), Serbian-Hungarian handballer
- Milorad Krivokapić (water polo) (born 1956), Montenegrin water polo player
