= Novak Bošković =

Serbian handball player (1989-2019)

Personal information
- Full name: Novak Bošković
- Nationality: Serbian
- Born: 23 May 1989 Sombor, SFR Yugoslavia
- Died: 3 February 2019 (aged 29) Crvenka, Serbia
- Height: 1.96 m (6 ft 5 in)

Sport
- Sport: Handball
- Position: Right back

Youth career
- Years: Team
- –: Crvenka

Senior clubs
- Years: Team
- –: Crvenka
- –: Vrbas
- –: Priboj
- 2010–2012: Maccabi Tel Aviv
- 2012–2013: Koper
- 2013: Al Rayyan
- 2013–2014: Maccabi Tel Aviv
- 2014–2015: Tatabánya
- 2015–2017: Maccabi Tel Aviv
- 2017: Dinamo București
- 2017–2019: Hapoel Rishon LeZion
National team
- Years: Team
- 2014–2018: Serbia

Novak Bošković (Serbian Cyrillic: Новак Бошковић; 23 May 1989 – 3 February 2019) was a Serbian handball player.

== Club career ==
Born in Sombor, Bošković started playing handball at Crvenka. He also played for Vrbas and Priboj, before moving abroad. Between 2010 and 2017, Bošković spent five seasons with Maccabi Tel Aviv on three occasions, winning two national championships in 2014 and 2016.

== International career ==
At international level, Bošković represented Serbia at the 2016 European Championship.

== Death ==
Bošković committed suicide by gunshot at his home in Crvenka on 3 February 2019. He was survived by his wife and his daughter who was born a few months prior to his death.

== Honours ==
Maccabi Tel Aviv

- Ligat Ha'Al: 2013–14, 2015–16

Hapoel Rishon LeZion

- Ligat Ha'Al: 2017–18
