= Ivan Karačić =

Bosnian handball player

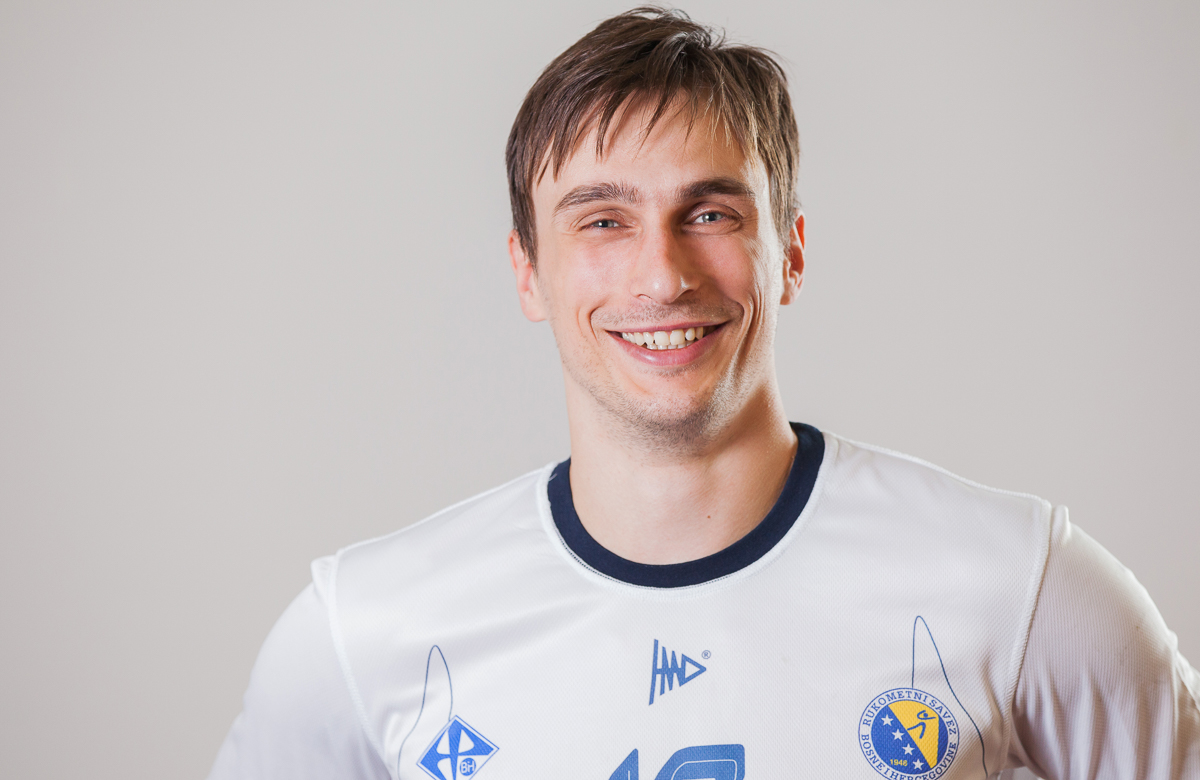

Personal information
- Born: 26 May 1985 (age 41) Mostar, SR Bosnia and Herzegovina, SFR Yugoslavia
- Height: 1.90 m (6 ft 3 in)

Sport
- Sport: Handball
- Position: Centre-back
- Current club: Maccabi Rishon LeZion
- Number: 29

Senior clubs
- Years: Team
- –: Zrinjski Mostar
- 2007–2008: Izviđač
- 2008–2012: Borac Banja Luka
- 2012–2013: Meshkov Brest
- 2013–2016: Minaur Baia Mare
- 2016: Kadetten Schaffhausen
- 2016–2024: Maccabi Rishon LeZion
- 2024–: Hapoel Rishon LeZion
National team
Years	Team	Apps	(Gls)
2011–2022	Bosnia and Herzegovina	77	(165)

Ivan Karačić (born 26 May 1985, Mostar) is a Bosnian handball player and former member of the Bosnian national team. He currently plays for Hapoel Rishon LeZion

Ivan made his debut for the national team of Bosnia and Herzegovina on 16 August 2004, in a friendly match against the Croatia in Pula. His first official game was played on 8 June 2011 against Hungary. In 77 games played Karačić scored 165 goals, which makes him one of the most effective representatives of Bosnia and Herzegovina.

== Club career ==
This brilliant centre back made his first handball steps in his hometown of Mostar, playing for HRMK Zrinjski, after which he transferred to RK Izviđač, in 2007. After a good season and 132 goals scored he was noticed by scouts of RK Borac, Banja Luka, one of the most successful clubs in former Yugoslavia who won the Champions Cup in 1976, in the next season played in the final of this prestigious competition, and won the EHF Cup in 1991. Playing for Borac he won the Bosnian National Cup in 2011 and played in EHF Cup. After four successful seasons in Borac he transferred to the Belarusian club Meshkov in 2012, with whom he has won two consecutive championships in seasons 2013/2014 and 2014/2015, as well as the national cup. In 2013 they were the winners of the regular SEHA league, and in the next two seasons were finalists of this European competition. In the current season he moved to the Romanian first division team HC Minaur Baia Mare who made a big surprise during season 2014/2015 winning the national championship and provided performance in the EHF Champions League. The start of the season was marked by injuries, but in the last six matches Ivan scored 64 goals in the championship and 24 goals in the last four matches of EHF Championship League. At the beginning of February 2016 he moved to Swiss champion Kaddeten Schaufhausen and won triple crown in his first season - National championship, Cup and SuperCup. In November 2016 he moved to Israel Maccabi Rishon LeZion and won the National Championship in his first season. With 163 goals scored in 27 games he was recognized as an MVP of Israel league and the best foreign player. He spent 8 successful years playing for Maccabi Rishon LeZion winning 4 national championships and one state cup. He became a captain of his team and one of the best player. In year 2024. Ivan signed for Hapoel Rishon LeZion

== Bosnian-Herzegovinian national team ==
With the national team of Bosnia and Herzegovina he fulfilled his childhood dream and competed at the World Championships in Qatar. "The team of Bosnia and Herzegovina has given me everything and now I will make it repay with every ounce of energy I have given this team. There is nothing in the world that can stop me to die for the team. All boys from Herzegovina yearn for the Croatian national team. Of course, it has objective reasons. Croatian national team is a world brand. All the players would like to play every competition for a medal. Now this is another image, lots of young boys would rather go to play for Bosnia and Herzegovina because it opens the opportunity, now when we qualified for the World Cup", said Karačić after reaching his team to the championship in Qatar. With Bosnian national team Karacic played 2 European championships. He retired from national team after Euro 2022

== Personal life ==
Karačić comes from a sports family. Igor, his brother who is three years younger, is also handballer as a playmaker but plays for the Croatian national team. His youngest brother, Goran, is a footballer and plays as a goalkeeper for the U-17/19/21 national team of Bosnia and Herzegovina.

It's an interesting story that attracted the attention of domestic and international media during the last World Cup in Qatar when the brothers Igor and Ivan played against each other in the group stage meeting between the Croatian and Bosnia and Herzegovina. Igor was more successful, scoring 7 goals in the 28:21 victory of the Croatian team..

== Honours ==
Borac Banja Luka

- Bosnian Handball Cup: 2010–11

Meshkov Brest

- Belarusian First League: 2013–14, 2014–15
- Belarusian Handball Cup: 2013–14, 2014–15

Maccabi Rishon LeZion

- Israeli Handball Championship: 2016–17, 2019–20, 2020–21, 2022–23, 2024–25
- Israel State Cup: 2018-19
