= Pavel Atman =

Russian handball player (born 1987)

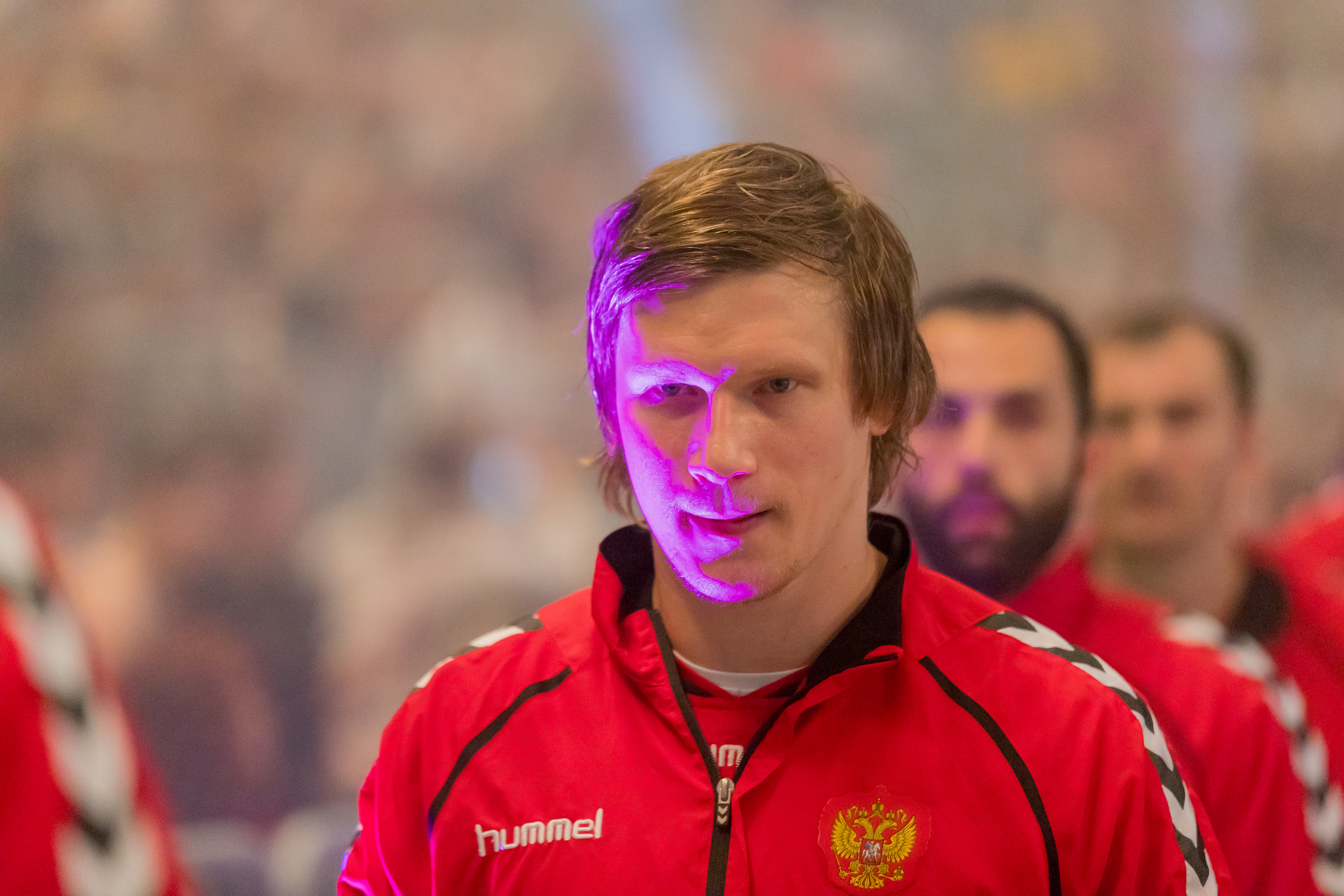
- Atman with Russia in 2016

Personal information
- Nationality: Russian
- Born: 25 May 1987 (age 39) Volgograd, Russia
- Height: 1.93 m (6 ft 4 in)

Sport
- Sport: Handball
- Position: Center back
- Current club: Maccabi Rishon LeZion
- Number: 19

Senior clubs
- Years: Team
- 2005–2010: HC Kaustik Volgograd
- 2010–2013: HC Dinamo Minsk
- 2013: Chekhovskiye Medvedi
- 2013–2015: RK Metalurg Skopje
- 2015: Al Ahli
- 2015: El Jaish
- 2015–2017: HC Meshkov Brest
- 2017–2019: TSV Hannover-Burgdorf
- 2019–2020: RK Vardar
- 2020–2022: HBC CSKA Moscow
- 2022–2024: Maccabi Rishon LeZion
- 2024–: Hapoel Rishon LeZion
National team
Years	Team	Apps	(Gls)
2008–	Russia	121	(236)

Pavel Nikolayevich Atman (Russian: Павел Николаевич Атьман; born 25 May 1987) is a Russian handball player for Maccabi Rishon LeZion and the Russian national team.
