= Maccabi Tel Aviv (handball) =

Israeli handball club

- Full name: Maccabi Tel Aviv
- Nickname(s): Maccabi; The Yellows
- Founded: 1930s
- Arena: Tichonet, Tel Aviv
- Capacity: 1,000
- President: Eyal Frolinger
- Head coach: Dragan Đukić
- League: Israeli Handball Premier League
- Club colours
Home	Away

Maccabi Tel Aviv (Hebrew: מכבי תל אביב) is a men's professional handball club based in Tel Aviv, Israel. They compete in the Israeli Handball Premier League, and host their home games in Tichonet, Tel Aviv. The club is under full ownership of Maccabi Tel Aviv Foundation; its chairman is Eyal Frolinger.

== History ==
=== Early years ===
The handball team of Maccabi Tel Aviv was founded in the 1930s when handball was first played in Mandatory Palestine. The club was initially three separate clubs; Maccabi North Tel Aviv, who won three national cups in a row between 1963 and 1965, Maccabi Tel Aviv and Brit Maccabim Atid. Over time the three clubs gradually amalgamated under the name of Maccabi Tel Aviv.

Over the years, players such as Avraham Shneior, Moshe Resch, Yoav Drucker, Mickey Tenenbaum and Avi Resch played in the team. All these players were also part of the Israeli national team and represented the country in various international tournaments and cups.

Except the three State Cups the club won during the 60s, Maccabi Tel Aviv wasn't a successful team in the Israeli handball and considered as a mid-table team for decades. In 1998, the team reached the State Cup final but lost it to Hapoel Rishon Lezion.

=== 2000s ===
After several years as a mid-table team, in 1999 the team started to regrow. The Maccabi Tel Aviv foundation began to invest more money in the handball department, the youth system in the club recovered and there were efforts to bring fans to home games.

Until 2009, these attempts were not successful. But that year Maccabi reached the State Cup semi-final, where they lost to the local rivals ASA Tel Aviv. The team finished the season in the fourth place of the league. One year later, the club established its first youth team. In the 2010–11 season, the team finished fifth in the league and was eliminated in the round of 16 of the State Cup.

In 2011–12, Maccabi finished the regular season in the third place and lost to Maccabi Rishon Lezion in the playoffs semi-finals. They were beaten by Hapoel Rishon Lezion in the State Cup final. In the same season they reached the semi-finals of the EHF Challenge Cup, but then lost to the Greek Diomidis Argous.

The financial investment in the team grew and they won their first championship in the 2013–14 season, after a sweep in the finals series against Hapoel Rishon Lezion. They did it again two years later, in the 2015–16 season, with Nedeljko Matić as head coach and with Milan Kosanović and Novak Bošković as the foreign players.

Maccabi started the 2016–17 season by terminating Nedeljko Matić contract, even though he won a championship with the team. They appointed Dragan Đukić as head coach and signed Israeli internationals Chen Pomeranz and Alex Sychenko. Maccabi lost to ABC/UMinho (27–34), but defeated Achilles Bocholt (33–30) in the qualification tournament of the 2016–17 EHF Champions League. As a result, they continued in the third qualifying round of the 2016–17 EHF Cup, where they defeated St. Petersburg HC and qualified, for the first time of their history, to the group stage. They hosted their home games in the group stage at the Drive in Arena.

== Current squad ==
Maccabi Tel Aviv squad
Goalkeepers: 79 (Serbia) Srđan Đorđević; 14 (Israel) Dan Tepper; 16 (Israel) Tom Shem Tov; Wingers: 83 (Israel) Gil Pomeranz; 8 (Israel) Ido Turel; 18 (Israel) Itamar Dahan; 11 (Israel) Sahar Halfon; Line players: 21 (Israel) Omer Davda (C); 19 (Israel) Yossi Appo	Back players: 7 (Serbia) Novak Bošković; 3 (Israel) Amir Seifert; 77 (Israel) Chen Pomeranz; 9 (Israel) Dan Nathan; 13 (Israel) Werner Strydom; 33 (Serbia) Bojan Butulija; 27 (Israel) Alex Sychenko; (Serbia) David Rašić	Technical staff: Head Coach: Dragan Đukić; Assistant Coach: Nikola Maksimović; Physiotherapist: Tal Klujni; Technical manager: Aviv Ashkelon

== Honours ==
- Israeli league
  - Winners: 2014, 2016
- State Cup
  - Winners: 1963, 1964, 1965, 2017

== European record ==
Season	Competition	Round	Club	1st leg	2nd leg	Aggregate
2011–12	EHF Challenge Cup	R3	(Turkey) BB Ankara Spor	18–25	32–23	50–48
2011–12	EHF Challenge Cup	L16	(Greece) A.C. Doukas	27–26	21–20	48–46
2011–12	EHF Challenge Cup	QF	(Slovenia) RK Maribor Branik	28–29	31–29	59–58
2011–12	EHF Challenge Cup	SF	(Greece) AC Diomidis Argous	26–29	21–21	47–50
2012–13	EHF Challenge Cup	R3	(Cyprus) SPE Strovolos Nicosia	26–25	22–32	48–57
2013–14	EHF Cup	R1	(Montenegro) RK Lovćen	37–35	30–29	67–64
2013–14	EHF Cup	R2	(North Macedonia) Strumica	26–26	23–30	49–56
2014–15	EHF Cup	R1	(Romania) Potaissa Turda	25–32	30–35	55–67
2016–17	EHF Champions League	Q	(Portugal) ABC/UMinho	27–34		3/4
2016–17	EHF Champions League	Q	(Belgium) HC Achilles Bocholt	33–30		3/4
2016–17	EHF Cup	R3	(Russia) Saint Petersburg HC	23–25	28–23	51–48
2016–17	EHF Cup	Group Stage	(Germany) SC Magdeburg	22–38	24–42	4/4
2016–17	EHF Cup	Group Stage	(Hungary) Grundfos Tatabánya KC	20–24	24–27	4/4
2016–17	EHF Cup	Group Stage	(Denmark) KIF Kolding København	25–31	31–36	4/4
2025–26	EHF European Cup	R2	(Cyprus) Anorthosis Famagusta	38–28	22–25	60–53
2025–26	EHF European Cup	R3	(Romania) HC Buzău	33–36	33–40	66–76
2026–27	EHF European Cup	R1	(Switzerland) BSV Bern	25–39	25–40	50–79

== See also ==
- Maccabi Tel Aviv
- Maccabi Tel Aviv F.C.
- Maccabi Tel Aviv B.C.
