= 2016–17 EHF Champions League qualifying =

This article describes the qualifying of the 2016–17 EHF Champions League.

== Draw ==
The draw was held on 29 June 2016 at 13:00 in Vienna, Austria. The eight teams were split in two groups and played a semifinal and final to determine the last participants. Matches were played on 3 and 4 September 2016.

=== Seedings ===
The seedings were announced on 27 June 2016.

Pot 1	Pot 2	Pot 3	Pot 4
(Slovenia) RK Gorenje (Portugal) ABC/UMinho	(Slovakia) Tatran Prešov (Austria) Bregenz Handball	(Luxembourg) Red Boys Differdange (Belgium) Achilles Bocholt	(Finland) Riihimäki Cocks (Israel) Maccabi Tel Aviv

== Qualification tournament 1 ==
Tatran Prešov organized the tournament.

=== Bracket ===
Semifinals
3 September
(Slovenia) RK Gorenje	28
(Finland) Riihimäki Cocks	25
3 September
(Slovakia) Tatran Prešov	38
(Luxembourg) Red Boys Differdange	32

Final
4 September
(Slovenia) RK Gorenje	21
(Slovakia) Tatran Prešov	23
Third place
4 September
(Finland) Riihimäki Cocks	30
(Luxembourg) Red Boys Differdange	21

=== Semifinals ===
3 September 2016; 13:30	RK Gorenje (Slovenia)	28–25	(Finland) Riihimäki Cocks	Tatran Handball Arena, Prešov; Attendance: 180; Referees: Covalciuc, Covalciuc (MDA)
3 September 2016; 13:30	Mitrović 7	(16–14)	Tamminen 6	Tatran Handball Arena, Prešov; Attendance: 180; Referees: Covalciuc, Covalciuc (MDA)
3 September 2016; 13:30	3× (yellow card) 4× (suspension)	Report	2× (yellow card) 4× (suspension)	Tatran Handball Arena, Prešov; Attendance: 180; Referees: Covalciuc, Covalciuc (MDA)

3 September 2016; 16:15	Tatran Prešov (Slovakia)	38–32	(Luxembourg) Red Boys Differdange	Tatran Handball Arena, Prešov; Attendance: 1,200; Referees: Mitrevski, Todorovski (MKD)
3 September 2016; 16:15	Hrstka, Rábek 9	(19–17)	Kratović 8	Tatran Handball Arena, Prešov; Attendance: 1,200; Referees: Mitrevski, Todorovski (MKD)
3 September 2016; 16:15	3× (yellow card) 5× (suspension)	Report	3× (yellow card) 1× (suspension)	Tatran Handball Arena, Prešov; Attendance: 1,200; Referees: Mitrevski, Todorovski (MKD)

=== Third place game ===
4 September 2016; 13:30	Riihimäki Cocks (Finland)	30–21	(Luxembourg) Red Boys Differdange	Tatran Handball Arena, Prešov; Attendance: 200; Referees: Mitrevski, Todorovski (MKD)
4 September 2016; 13:30	Lukyanchuk 6	(18–14)	Hoffmann, Kratović 5	Tatran Handball Arena, Prešov; Attendance: 200; Referees: Mitrevski, Todorovski (MKD)
4 September 2016; 13:30	3× (yellow card) 5× (suspension)	Report	3× (yellow card) 4× (suspension)	Tatran Handball Arena, Prešov; Attendance: 200; Referees: Mitrevski, Todorovski (MKD)

=== Final ===
4 September 2016; 16:15	RK Gorenje (Slovenia)	21–23	(Slovakia) Tatran Prešov	Tatran Handball Arena, Prešov; Attendance: 2,100; Referees: Covalciuc, Covalciuc (MDA)
4 September 2016; 16:15	Golčar 5	(10–12)	Rábek 7	Tatran Handball Arena, Prešov; Attendance: 2,100; Referees: Covalciuc, Covalciuc (MDA)
4 September 2016; 16:15	3× (yellow card) 3× (suspension) 1× (red card)	Report	3× (yellow card) 3× (suspension)	Tatran Handball Arena, Prešov; Attendance: 2,100; Referees: Covalciuc, Covalciuc (MDA)

== Qualification tournament 2 ==
Bregenz Handball organized the tournament.

=== Bracket ===
Semifinals
3 September
(Portugal) ABC/UMinho	34
(Israel) Maccabi Tel Aviv	27
3 September
(Austria) Bregenz Handball	39
(Belgium) Achilles Bocholt	31

Final
4 September
(Portugal) ABC/UMinho	33
(Austria) Bregenz Handball	32
Third place
4 September
(Israel) Maccabi Tel Aviv	33
(Belgium) Achilles Bocholt	30

=== Semifinals ===
3 September 2016; 16:45	Bregenz Handball (Austria)	39–31	(Belgium) Achilles Bocholt	Handball-Arena Rieden/Vorkloster, Bregenz; Attendance: 550; Referees: Zotin, Volodkov (RUS)
3 September 2016; 16:45	Buvinić 8	(20–17)	Kedziora 9	Handball-Arena Rieden/Vorkloster, Bregenz; Attendance: 550; Referees: Zotin, Volodkov (RUS)
3 September 2016; 16:45	3× (yellow card) 1× (suspension)	Report	2× (yellow card) 7× (suspension)	Handball-Arena Rieden/Vorkloster, Bregenz; Attendance: 550; Referees: Zotin, Volodkov (RUS)

3 September 2016; 19:30	ABC/UMinho (Portugal)	34–27	(Israel) Maccabi Tel Aviv	Handball-Arena Rieden/Vorkloster, Bregenz; Attendance: 300; Referees: Konjičanin, Konjičanin (BIH)
3 September 2016; 19:30	Pereira 7	(15–16)	Pomeranz 12	Handball-Arena Rieden/Vorkloster, Bregenz; Attendance: 300; Referees: Konjičanin, Konjičanin (BIH)
3 September 2016; 19:30	3× (yellow card) 4× (suspension)	Report	2× (yellow card) 4× (suspension)	Handball-Arena Rieden/Vorkloster, Bregenz; Attendance: 300; Referees: Konjičanin, Konjičanin (BIH)

=== Third place game ===
4 September 2016; 13:45	Maccabi Tel Aviv (Israel)	33–30	(Belgium) Achilles Bocholt	Handball-Arena Rieden/Vorkloster, Bregenz; Attendance: 200; Referees: Konjičanin, Konjičanin (BIH)
4 September 2016; 13:45	Pomeranz 10	(16–15)	Kedziora 8	Handball-Arena Rieden/Vorkloster, Bregenz; Attendance: 200; Referees: Konjičanin, Konjičanin (BIH)
4 September 2016; 13:45	2× (yellow card) 1× (suspension)	Report	3× (yellow card) 4× (suspension)	Handball-Arena Rieden/Vorkloster, Bregenz; Attendance: 200; Referees: Konjičanin, Konjičanin (BIH)

=== Final ===
4 September 2016; 16:30	ABC/UMinho (Portugal)	33–32	(Austria) Bregenz Handball	Handball-Arena Rieden/Vorkloster, Bregenz; Attendance: 940; Referees: Zotin, Volodkov (RUS)
4 September 2016; 16:30	Pereira 11	(16–16)	Hedin, Varvne 6	Handball-Arena Rieden/Vorkloster, Bregenz; Attendance: 940; Referees: Zotin, Volodkov (RUS)
4 September 2016; 16:30	3× (yellow card) 2× (suspension)	Report	2× (yellow card) 2× (suspension)	Handball-Arena Rieden/Vorkloster, Bregenz; Attendance: 940; Referees: Zotin, Volodkov (RUS)
