= Željko Đurđić =

Serbian handball goalkeeper (1962-2014)

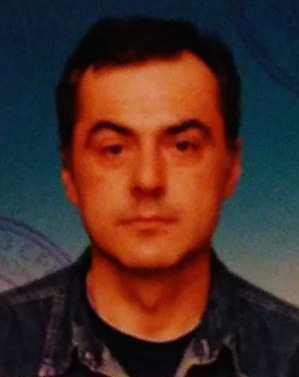

Personal information
- Full name: Željko Đurđić
- Born: 8 November 1962 Doboj, PR Bosnia and Herzegovina, FPR Yugoslavia
- Died: 28 July 2014 (aged 51) Zrenjanin, Serbia

Sport
- Sport: Handball
- Position: Goalkeeper

Senior clubs
- Years: Team
- 1977–1988: Sloga Bosnaprevoz
- 1988–1996: Proleter Naftagas
National team
Years	Team	Apps	(Gls)
–	Yugoslavia	45	(0)

Željko Đurđić (Serbian Cyrillic: Жељко Ђурђић, pronounced [ʒěːʎko dʑûrdʑitɕ]; 8 November 1962 – 28 July 2014) was a Serbian handball goalkeeper.

Known locally by the nickname Džigi, he captained RK Proleter Zrenjanin to the 1990–91 European Handball Cup final where Proleter narrowly lost to Barcelona. He played 45 times for the Yugoslav national handball team.

== Health issues ==
Falling out of the limelight after his retirement in 1996, his name began appearing in newspapers once again in late 2011. Đurđić said in an interview that he was living in poverty, and that although he needed surgery on both his knees, he was unable to afford it.

Đurđić died in Zrenjanin on 28 July 2014.
