= Mario Kelentrić =

Croatian handball player (born 1973)

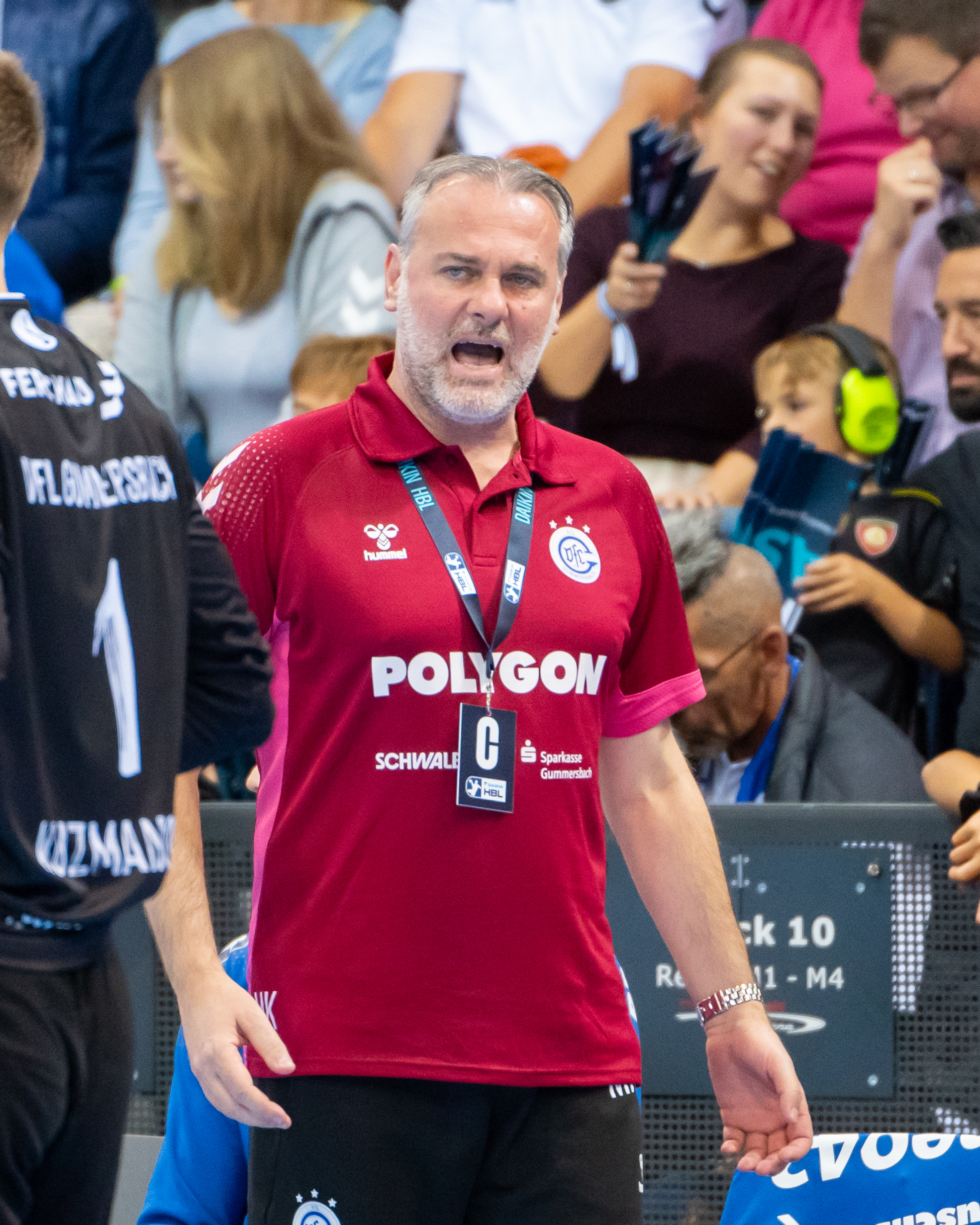
- Kelentrić 2024

Personal information
- Full name: Mario Kelentrić
- Nationality: Croatian
- Born: 30 January 1973 (age 53) Gradačac, SFR Yugoslavia
- Height: 1.90 m (6 ft 3 in)

Sport
- Sport: Handball
- Position: Goalkeeper

Senior clubs
- Years: Team
- 1991–1993: RK Zaprešić
- 1993–1999: RK Medveščak Zagreb
- 1999–2001: RK Badel 1862 Zagreb
- 2001–2002: RK Pivovara Laško Celje
- 2002–2003: RK Metković Jambo
- 2003–2004: RK Zagreb
- 2004–2005: TUSEM Essen
- 2005–2006: RK Agram Medveščak
- 2006–2007: Saint-Marcel Vernon
- 2007–2012: MT Melsungen
- 2012–2013: RK CO Zagreb
National team
Years	Team	Apps	(Gls)
1997–2004	Croatia	86	(0)

Teams managed
- 2013–2020: RK Zagreb (GK coach)
- 2019–2021: Croatia (GK coach)
- 2020–2021: RK Sloga Doboj
- 2021–: Bosnia and Herzegovina (GK coach)
- 2021–2025: VfL Gummersbach (GK coach)
- 2025–: RK Vardar 1961 (GK coach)
Medal record
Men's handball
Representing Croatia
World Championship
Gold medal – first place	2003 Portugal	Team competition
Mediterranean Games
Gold medal – first place	1997 Bari	Team competition
Gold medal – first place	2001 Tunis	Team competition
Super Cup
Silver medal – second place	1999 Germany	Team competition

Mario Kelentrić (born 30 January 1973) is a retired Croatian handball player who is currently the goalkeeping coach of the Bosnian national team and RK Vardar 1961.

He has played for clubs in Croatia, Slovenia, Germany and France.

He is noted as being one of the best goalkeepers of Croatia and he was also part of the golden generation witch won the 2003 World Championship in Portugal.

== Career ==
In 1993 Kelentrić signed with RK Medveščak Zagreb. In his first season with the club he reached the final of the Croatian Cup. During his seven-year stay he reached two more cup finals and was in the top flight for most of his time spent there.

In 1999 he moved to Badel 1862 Zagreb. In his first season with the club he reached the semi-final of the EHF Champions League and won both domestic titles. In 2001 he moved to Pivovara Laško Celje and unfortunately was part of a team that lost the domestic title for the first time since the inception of the Slovenian League.

In 2002 he moved to Metković Jambo but he stayed at the club for only half a season leaving in January 2003 to return to RK Zagreb. In 2004 he left for Germany signing with TUSEM Essen with whom he won the EHF Cup.

Later he had short stints with RK Agram Medveščak and Saint-Marcel Vernon before moving to MT Melsungen where he played for six years. While there he took part in HBL All-Star Game 2009.

He finally retired in 2013 in RK Zagreb.

== International career ==
He appeared for the national team from 1997 to 2004 making 86 appearances notably sporting the jersey number 1.

He played at 1997 Mediterranean Games, 1998 European Championship, 1999 World Championship, 1999 Super Cup, 2001 World Championship, 2001 Mediterranean Games, 2002 European Championship, 2003 World Championship and at the 2004 European Championship.

After the 2004 European Championship national team head coach Lino Červar never called up Kelentrić to play for the national team even though he was the best goalkeeper in Croatia at the time.

Kelentrić has stated numerous time since that he hates Červar for not calling him up for the 2004 Summer Olympics and that he will never forgive him for that.

== Honours ==
Medveščak

- Croatian Cup
  - Finalist (3): 1994, 1999, 2006
- Limburgse Handbal Dagen
  - Winner (1): 1993

Zagreb

- Croatian First A League/First League/Premier League
  - Winner (5): 1999-2000, 2000-01, 2002-03, 2003-04, 2012-13
- Croatian Cup
  - Winner (4): 2000, 2003, 2004, 2013
- SEHA League
  - Winner (1): 2012-13

Celje

- Slovenian First League
  - Runner-up (1): 2001-02
- Slovenian Cup
  - Finalist (1): 2002

Essen

- EHF Cup
  - Winner (1): 2005

Individual

- 2003 Athletes of the Year - Most Successful Men's Team by: COC
