= David Špiler =

Slovenian handball player (born 1983)

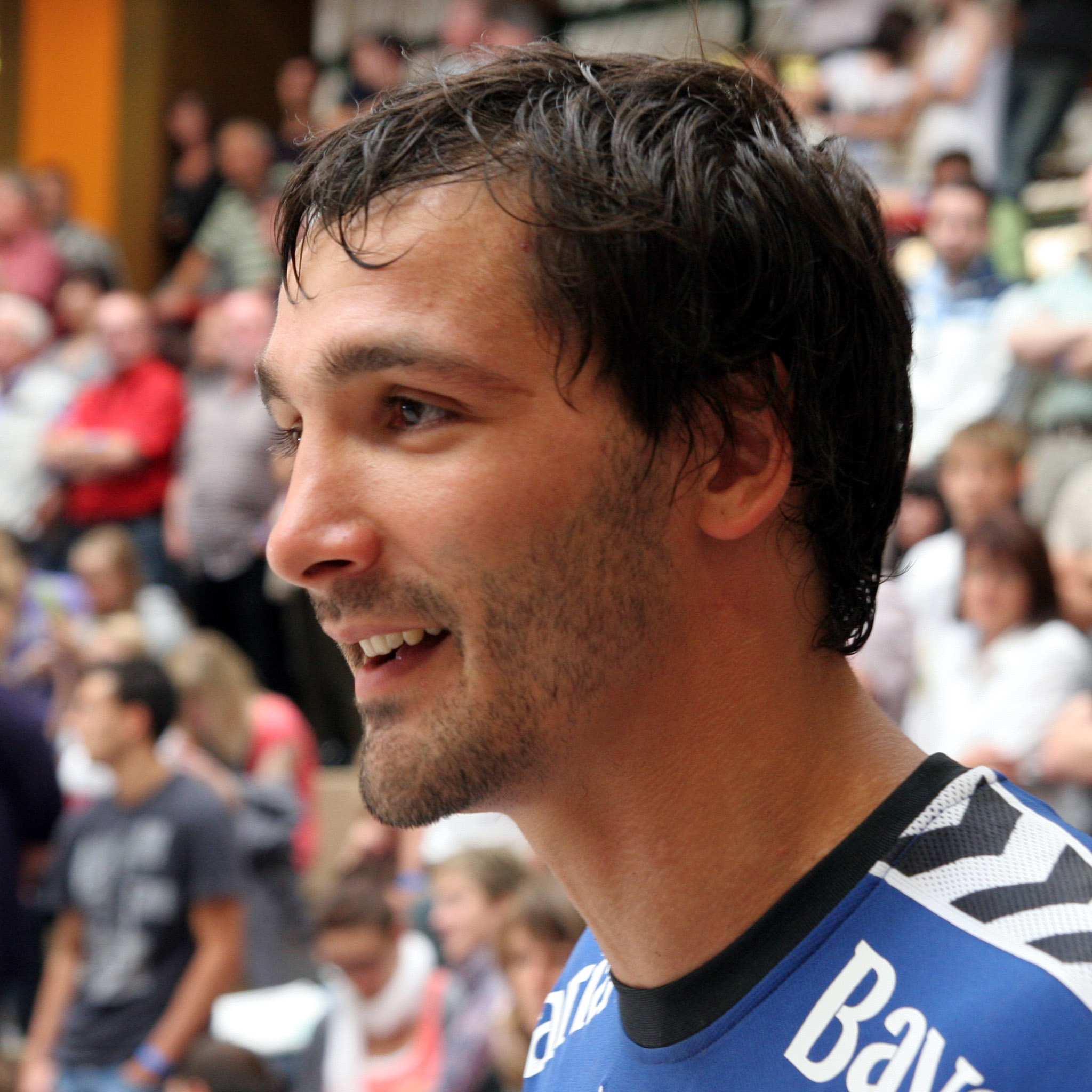

Personal information
- Nationality: Slovenian
- Born: 2 January 1983 (age 43) Kranj, SFR Yugoslavia
- Height: 1.90 m (6 ft 3 in)

Sport
- Sport: Handball
- Position: Centre back
- Current club: Hapoel Ashdod

Senior clubs
- Years: Team
- 2002–2006: RK Slovenj Gradec
- 2006–2009: RK Celje
- 2009–2010: RK Koper
- 2010–2011: RK Zagreb
- 2011: Al-Rayyan
- 2011–2013: RK Zagreb
- 2013–2015: HC Meshkov Brest
- 2015: RK Metalurg Skopje
- 2016: MRK Metalac
- 2016–2017: RK Nexe
- 2017: MRK Metalac
- 2018: RK Bjelovar
- 2018–2019: Die Eulen Ludwigshafen
- 2019–2020: Hapoel Ashdod
- 2020–: RK Bjelovar
National team
Years	Team	Apps	(Gls)
2012–	Slovenia	134	(293)

David Špiler (born 2 January 1983) is a Slovenian handball player who plays for Hapoel Ashdod.

He has taken part in many international events including the 2007 World Men's Handball Championship in Germany.
