= DeKi 300 =

DeKi 300 may refer to the following:

- Meitetsu DeKi 300, an electric locomotive type operated by Meitetsu in Japan
- Chichibu Railway Class DeKi 300, an electric locomotive type operated by Chichibu Railway in Japan
