= Tihomir Doder =

Serbian handball player (born 1979)

Personal information
- Full name: Tihomir Doder
- Nationality: Serbian
- Born: 8 August 1979 (age 47) Novi Sad, SFR Yugoslavia
- Height: 1.94 m (6 ft 4 in)

Sport
- Sport: Handball
- Position: Centre back
- Current club: Gajdobra
- Number: 10

Youth career
- Years: Team
- –: Jugović

Senior clubs
- Years: Team
- –: Jugović
- –: Club Africain
- 2005–2006: Cangas
- 2006–2007: Vardar
- 2007–2011: Cangas
- 2011–2012: Vardar
- 2012–2013: Metalurg Skopje
- 2013–2014: Hapoel Rishon LeZion
- 2014–2017: Hapoel Ashdod
- 2017–2019: Maccabi Kiryat Motzkin
- 2019–2020: Cangas
- 2020-2021: Jugović
- 2022 -: Gajdobra
National team
- Years: Team
- 2002: FR Yugoslavia

Tihomir Doder (Serbian Cyrillic: Тихомир Додер; born 8 August 1979) is a Serbian handball player for Serbian club in third league Gajdobra

== Career ==
Doder started out at Jugović and helped the club win the EHF Challenge Cup in the 2000–01 season. He later moved abroad to Tunisia. Between 2005 and 2012, Doder played for Cangas and Vardar, spending two periods with each club.

Doder represented FR Yugoslavia at the 2002 European Men's Handball Championship.
