= Rajko Prodanović =

Serbian handball player (born 1986)

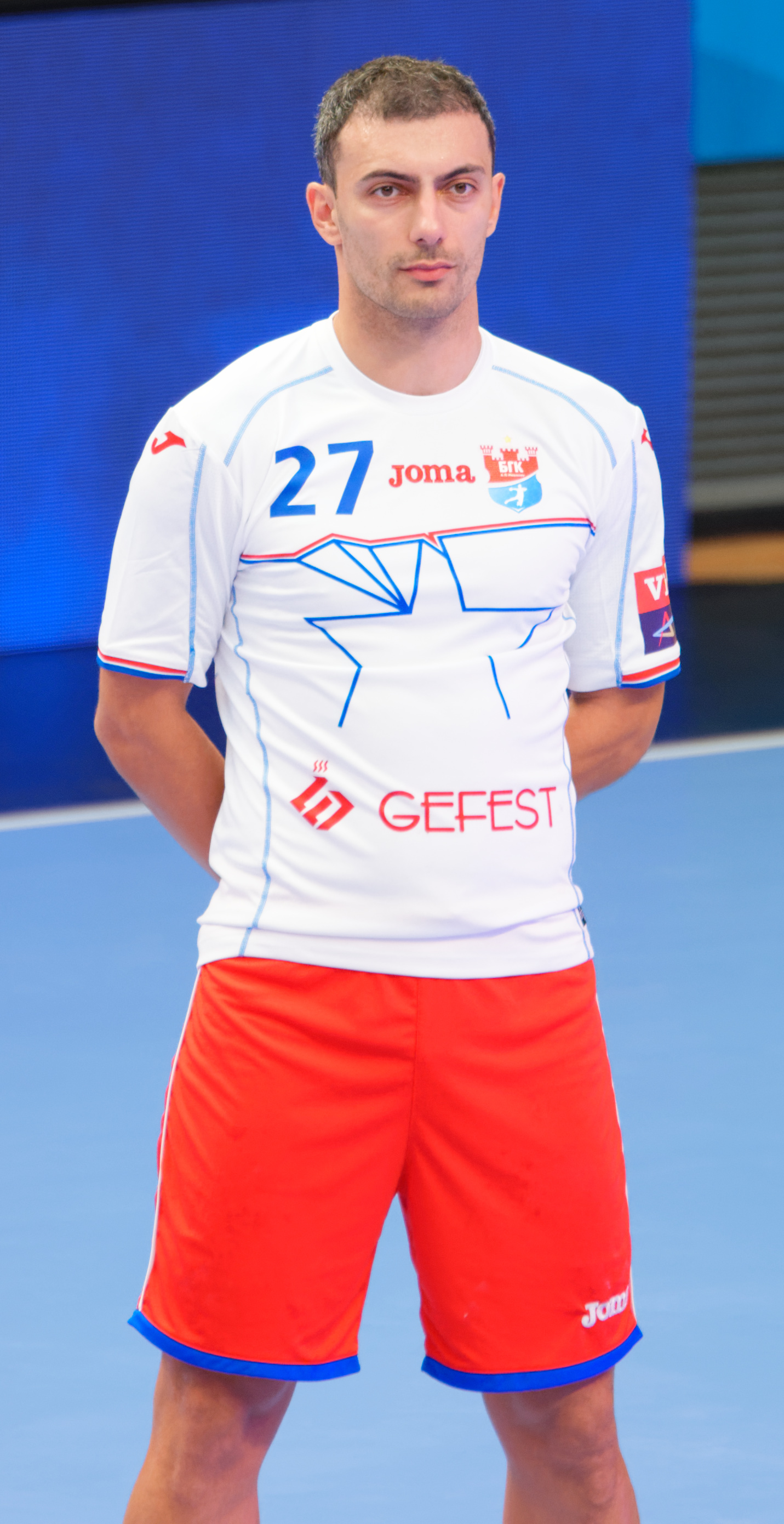
- Prodanović in 2017

Personal information
- Full name: Rajko Prodanović
- Nationality: Serbian
- Born: 24 April 1986 (age 40) Gajdobra, SFR Yugoslavia
- Height: 1.86 m (6 ft 1 in)

Sport
- Sport: Handball
- Position: Right wing

Youth career
- Years: Team
- –: Jugović

Senior clubs
- Years: Team
- 2002–2008: Jugović
- 2008–2010: Antequera
- 2010–2011: Vardar
- 2011–2013: Pick Szeged
- 2013–2014: Rhein-Neckar Löwen
- 2014–2016: Pick Szeged
- 2016–2018: Meshkov Brest
- 2018–2020: Vojvodina
National team
Years	Team	Apps	(Gls)
2006–2018	Serbia	111	(265)
Medal record
Men's handball
Representing Serbia and Montenegro
U21 World Championship
Silver medal – second place	2005 Hungary	Team
U19 World Championship
Gold medal – first place	2005 Qatar	Team
U18 European Championship
Gold medal – first place	2004 Serbia and Montenegro	Team
Representing Serbia
European Championship
Silver medal – second place	2012 Serbia	Team
Mediterranean Games
Gold medal – first place	2009 Pescara	Team

Rajko Prodanović (Serbian Cyrillic: Рајко Продановић; born 24 April 1986) is a Serbian handball player for Hercegovac Gajdobra.

== Club career ==
After starting out at Jugović, Prodanović moved to Spain and joined Antequera in 2008. He also played abroad for Vardar, Pick Szeged (two spells), Rhein-Neckar Löwen, and Meshkov Brest. In 2018, Prodanović returned to his homeland and signed with Vojvodina.

== International career ==
=== Youth ===
At youth level, Prodanović was a regular member of the Serbia and Montenegro winning squad at the 2004 European Under-18 Championship. He subsequently helped the nation win the gold medal at the World Under-19 Championship in August 2005. Later that month, Prodanović also participated at the 2005 World Under-21 Championship, as the team finished as runners-up.

=== Senior ===
A full Serbia international since its inception, Prodanović was a member of the team that won the silver medal at the 2012 European Championship. He also participated in the 2012 Summer Olympics and three World Championships (2009, 2011 and 2013).

== Honours ==
Meshkov Brest

- Belarusian Men's Handball Championship: 2016–17, 2017–18
- Belarusian Men's Handball Cup: 2016–17, 2017–18

Vojvodina

- Serbian Handball Super League: 2018–19
- Serbian Handball Cup: 2018–19
- Serbian Handball Super Cup: 2018, 2019
