= Renato Vugrinec =

Slovenian-Macedonian handball player

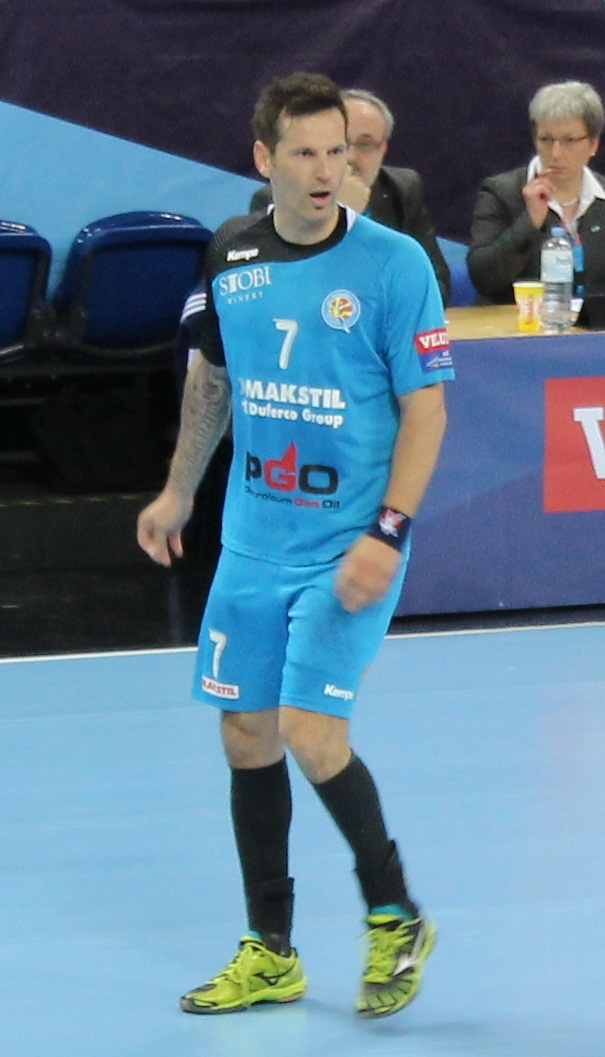

Personal information
- Nationality: Slovenian/Macedonian
- Born: 9 June 1975 (age 51) Celje, SR Slovenia, SFR Yugoslavia
- Height: 1.96 m (6 ft 5 in)

Sport
- Sport: Handball
- Position: Right back

Senior clubs
- Years: Team
- –1997: RK Drava Ptuj
- 1997–2004: RK Celje
- 2004–2006: SC Magdeburg
- 2006–2009: SDC San Antonio
- 2009–2010: RK Celje
- 2010–2011: Al Sadd
- 2011–2012: HSV Hamburg
- 2012: RK Maribor Branik
- 2012–2015: RK Metalurg Skopje
- 2015: Lekhwiya SC
- 2015–2016: Maccabi Rishon LeZion
- 2016–2017: Hapoel Rishon LeZion
National team
Years	Team	Apps	(Gls)
1996–2010	Slovenia	187	(616)
2014–2015	Macedonia		
Medal record
Representing Slovenia
European Championship
Silver medal – second place	2004 Slovenia	Team

Renato Vugrinec (born 9 June 1975) is a Slovenian-Macedonian retired handball player who is currently the sports director for Serbian club Partizan. Before switching his national team alliagance, Vugrinec was a long time member of Slovenia men's national handball team and represented the country on several international tournaments, including the 2000 and the 2004 Summer Olympic Games, before retiring from international play in 2010. Since March 2014 he became eligible to play for Macedonia national handball team, after receiving the country's citizenship in late 2013, and he has made his debut for their national team in June 2014.

== Club career ==
Raised in Videm pri Ptuju, Vugrinec began playing handball in the nearby Ptuj and remained there until 1997 when he transferred to Slovenian club Celje. In late 1990s and early 2000s Celje was regarded as one of the teams who formed the European club handball elite and they were regularly qualifying among the top four in the EHF Champions League. During the 2003–04 season Celje won the EHF Champions League after they have defeated the German side Flensburg in a two-legged final. Vugrinec was one of the most important players for his club during the course of the 2003–04 Champions league campaign finishing the competition on ninth place among scorers with 58 goals, including ten which he scored in a two-legged final.

After the successful season Celje sold a number of their star players and Vugrinec moved to the German club Magdeburg where he stayed for two seasons. In 2006 he moved to top Spanish side San Antonio but left the financial troubled club after only one season when he returned to Celje. Considered a club legend in Celje, Vugrinec spent a total of ten and a half seasons with the 2004 European club champions where he scored a total of 1,465 goals in all competitions. After a short spell at Celje Vugrinec then signed for Qatari club Al Sadd where he remained until 2011. Shortly after the start of the 2011–2012 season he moved, this time returning to Germany where he signed a one-year contract with HSV Hamburg. During the summer of 2012 he returned to his native Slovenia and signed a contract with Maribor Branik but remained there only until the end of August of the same year, after he signed with Macedonian side Metalurg Skopje. In February 2015 he signed with Lekhwiya.

== International career ==
=== Slovenia ===
Between 1996 and 2010 Vugrinec was a member of the Slovenia men's national handball team and he has made several appearances for the team at the European and World championships, including two appearances at the Summer Olympic Games (2000 and 2004). He was a member of the Slovenian team which were runners-up at the 2004 European Men's Handball Championship. With 187 appearances and 616 goals he is among the most capped and most prolific goal scorers in history of the Slovenia men's national handball team.

=== Macedonia ===
In late 2013 Vugrinec received Macedonian citizenship and the Macedonian Handball Federation wanted the player to appear for their national team at the 2014 European Men's Handball Championship, played in Denmark during January 2014, however, this was denied by the European Handball Federation on the basis that Vugrinec has not lived in Macedonia continuously for two years. In March 2014 the 38-year-old Vugrinec became eligible to play for the Macedonia national handball team, after a decision issued by the International Handball Federation.

On 7 June 2014 the 38 years old Vugrinec made his debut for Macedonia on a 2015 World Men's Handball Championship qualifying match against Greece which was won by Macedonia with the score 25–27, with Vugrinec contributing one goal.

== Personal life ==
In November 2024, Vugrinec joined the populist Serbian Progressive Party.
