= Svetislav Verkić =

Serbian handball player (born 1981)

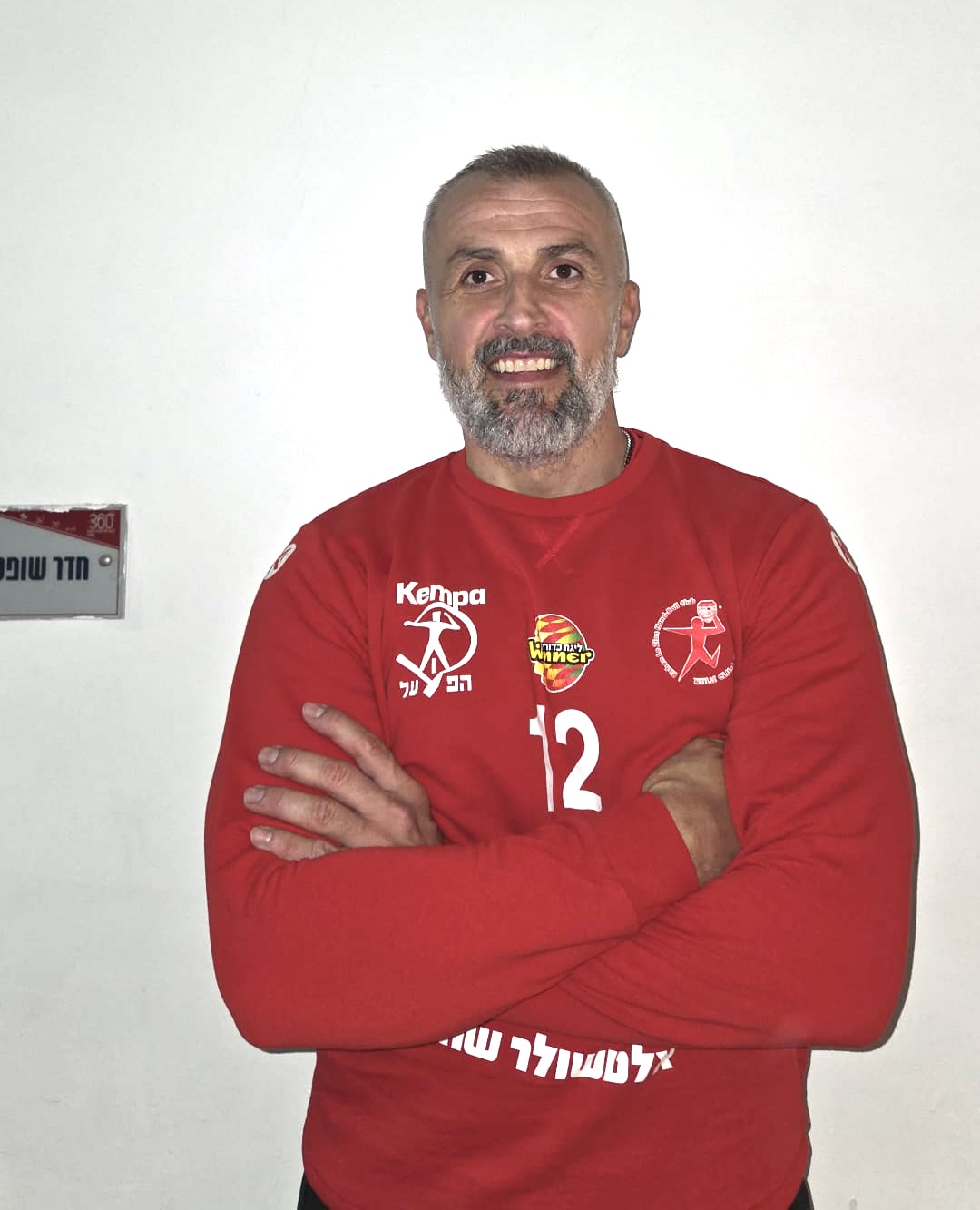
- Verkić in Hapoel Rishon LeZion, 2026

Personal information
- Full name: Svetislav Verkić
- Nationality: Serbian
- Born: 11 June 1981 (age 45) Novi Sad, SFR Yugoslavia
- Height: 1.89 m (6 ft 2 in)

Sport
- Sport: Handball
- Position: Goalkeeper
- Current club: Vojvodina
- Number: 37

Senior clubs
- Years: Team
- –: Jugović
- 2005–2006: Vojvodina
- 2006–2007: Crvena zvezda
- 2007–2010: Madeira
- 2010–2011: Oppsal
- 2011–2015: Tatran Prešov
- 2015–2016: ThSV Eisenach
- 2016–2017: MT Melsungen
- 2017–2022: Vojvodina
- 2022–2023: Hapoel Ashdod
- 2024–: Hapoel Rishon LeZion
National team
- Years: Team
- 2019–: Serbia

Svetislav Verkić (Serbian Cyrillic: Светислав Веркић; born 11 June 1981) is a Serbian handball player for Vojvodina and the Serbia national team.

== Career ==
Verkić started out at Jugović and helped the club win the EHF Challenge Cup in the 2000–01 season. He later moved abroad and played in Portugal, Norway, Slovakia and Germany.

At international level, Verkić represented Serbia at the 2019 World Men's Handball Championship.
