= Maccabi Avishai Motzkin =

Handball club

Maccabi Avishai Motzkin מכבי אבישי מוצקין
- Founded: 1960; 66 years ago
- Arena: Goshen Hall
- Capacity: 500
- President: (Israel) Pinni Lebowitz
- Head coach: (Serbia) Miljan Stanić
- League: Ligat Winner Big
- 2015/16: 11
- Club colours
Home	Away

Maccabi Avishai Motzkin (Hebrew: מכבי אבישי מוצקין), is a handball club from the city of Kiryat Motzkin, Israel. competes in the Ligat Winner Big. It is in the Israeli first division.

The club was established in 1960. In most years of its existence, the team is based on the players Who grew up in a club. The club also operates a large junior's department.

2000/01 season the team participated in the European Cup groups And lost in two meetings total to the Team of "Dennis Turko" from Finland.

2010/11 season, the team came up to the State Cup Semifinal, and lost to Hapoel Rishon LeZion.

The team's colors are Blue and Yellow, and it hosts its home games in Moshe Goshen Sport Hall in Kiryat Motzkin.

== Notable players roster ==
- (Israel) Oren Meirovitch
- (Israel) Itai Goshen (Captain)
- (Israel) Alon Cohen
- (Israel) Vladi Cofman
- (Israel) Maor Afuta
- (Israel) Yariv Rinkov
- (Romania) Roman Giorgi
- (Serbia) Bratislav Stanković
- (Serbia) Nenad Mandić
- (Serbia) Dušan Bozoljac
- (Serbia) Aleksandar Bosić
- (Serbia) Miralem Bećirović
- (Montenegro) Igor Radojević
- (Montenegro) Filip Leovać
