= Milorad Krivokapić (handballer) =

Serbian-Hungarian handball player (born 1980)

Personal information
- Full name: Milorad Krivokapić
- Nationality: Serbian / Hungarian
- Born: 30 July 1980 (age 46) Senta, SR Serbia, SFR Yugoslavia
- Height: 1.90 m (6 ft 3 in)

Sport
- Sport: Handball
- Position: Right back
- Current club: Ceglédi KKSE
- Number: 13

Senior clubs
- Years: Team
- 1996–2002: Jugović
- 2002–2005: Dunaferr
- 2005–2010: Pick Szeged
- 2010–2013: Koper
- 2013: Al Rayyan
- 2013–2014: Tatabánya
- 2014–2015: Maccabi Rishon LeZion
- 2015–2016: Hapoel Rishon LeZion
- 2016–2017: Hapoel Ashdod
- 2017–2018: Székelyudvarhelyi KC
- 2018–2019: Gyöngyösi KK
- 2019–: Ceglédi KKSE
National team
- Years: Team
- 2004–2006: Serbia and Montenegro
- 2010–2013: Hungary

Milorad Krivokapić (Serbian Cyrillic: Милорад Кривокапић; born 30 July 1980) is a Serbian-Hungarian handball player for Hungarian club Ceglédi KKSE.

== Career ==
Krivokapić started out at Jugović and helped the club win the EHF Challenge Cup in the 2000–01 season. He later moved abroad to Hungary and signed with Dunaferr in 2002. Three years later, Krivokapić switched to fellow Hungarian club Pick Szeged. He helped them win the national championship in the 2006–07 season. In 2010, Krivokapić moved to Slovenia and joined Koper. He would also spend three years in Israel, from 2014 to 2017, playing for Maccabi Rishon LeZion, Hapoel Rishon LeZion and Hapoel Ashdod.

At international level, Krivokapić represented Serbia and Montenegro in three major tournaments. He later switched allegiance to Hungary, making his major debut at the 2010 European Men's Handball Championship.

== Personal life ==
Krivokapić is the younger brother of fellow handball player Marko Krivokapić.

== Honours ==
Jugović

- EHF Challenge Cup: 2000–01

Pick Szeged

- Nemzeti Bajnokság I: 2006–07
- Magyar Kupa: 2005–06, 2007–08

Koper

- Slovenian First League: 2010–11
- Slovenian Cup: 2010–11
- EHF Challenge Cup: 2010–11
