= Peđa Dejanović =

Bosnian handball player

Personal information
- Born: 6 March 1982 (age 44) Doboj, Bosnia and Herzegovina
- Height: 1.89 m (6 ft 2 in)

Sport
- Sport: Handball
- Position: Goalkeeper
- Current club: RK Sloga Doboj
- Number: 16
National team
| Years | Team | Apps | (Gls) |
| – | Bosnia and Herzegovina | 9 | (0) |
- Updated on 26 January 2015

Peđa Dejanović (born 6 March 1982) is a Bosnian handball goalkeeper. Dejanović currently plays for Sloga Doboj. He was a longtime goalkeeper of Sloga Doboj. He also played for Hapoel rishon lezion, RK Goražde and Borac Banja Luka.
