= Rok Golčar =

Slovenian handball player

Rok Golćar
Personal information
- Nationality: Slovenian
- Born: 23 December 1985 (age 40) Slovenj Gradec, Slovenia, Yugoslavia
- Height: 1.89 m (6 ft 2 in)

Sport
- Sport: Handball
- Position: Right wing
- Current club: SC Ferlach (Austria)
- Number: 23

Senior clubs
- Years: Team
- 1996-2018: RK Velenje (Slovenia)
- 2018-2021: SC Ferlach (Austria)
- 2021-2022: RK Slovenj Gradec (Slovenia)

Rok Golčar (born 23 December 1985 in Slovenj Gradec, Yugoslavia) is a Slovenian former professional handball player.

He played from 2018 to 2021 for SC Ferlach in Austria, where he joined from Slovenian club RK Velenje. He won the Slovenian league three times. In 2021 he returned to Slovenia to join RK Slovenj Gradec. After a season he retired.
