= Dejan =

South Slavic male name

- Pronunciation: [dějan]
- Gender: Male

Origin
- Origin: Serb
- Region of origin: Balkans

Other names
- Variant forms: Dejaniš, Dejana (f.)

Dejan (Cyrillic: Дејан) is a South Slavic masculine given name, derived from the Slavic verb dejati, meaning "to act, to do". The name and the derived surname Dejanović are common among South Slavs.

The name is first recorded in 1325 (1333) for a voevod of king Stefan Uroš.

== Notable people ==
- Dejan (fl. 1346-66), Serbian magnate
- Dejan Bodiroga (born 1973), Serbian basketball player
- Dejan Dabović (1944–2020), Yugoslav water polo player
- Dejan Damjanović (born 1981), Montenegrin footballer
- Dejan Dimitrovski (born 1979), Macedonian footballer
- Dejan Gluščević (born 1967), Serbian footballer and manager
- Dejan Iliev (born 1995), Macedonian footballer
- Dejan Janković (born 1986), Serbian footballer
- Dejan Judež (born 1990), Slovenian ski jumper
- Dejan Kelhar (born 1984), Slovenian footballer
- Dejan Kulusevski (born 2000), Swedish footballer of Macedonian descent
- Dejan Lovren (born 1989), Croatian footballer
- Dejan Medaković (1922–2008), Serbian art historian, writer and academician
- Dejan Meleg (born 1994), Serbian footballer
- Dejan Milojević (1977–2024), Serbian basketball player and coach
- Dejan Milovanović (1984–2025), Serbian footballer
- Dejan Petković (born 1972), Serbian footballer
- Dejan Petković (born 1958), Serbian singer
- Dejan Ristanović (1963–2025), Serbian writer and computer publicist
- Dejan Savić (born 1975), Serbian water polo player and coach
- Dejan Savićević (born 1966), Montenegrin footballer
- Dejan Stanković (born 1978), Serbian footballer and manager
- Dejan Stefanović (born 1974), Serbian footballer
- Dejan Stojanović (born 1959), Serbian poet, writer, essayist, philosopher, businessman and journalist
- Dejan Tomašević (born 1973), Serbian basketball player
- Dejan Udovičić (born 1970), Serbian water polo coach
- Dejan Đedović (born 1973), Serbian futsal coach

== See also ==
- Dejana, feminine given name
