= Darko Dejanović =

Serbian footballer

Personal information
- Full name: Darko Dejanović
- Date of birth: 17 March 1995 (age 31)
- Place of birth: Banja Luka, Bosnia and Herzegovina
- Height: 1.93 m (6 ft 4 in)
- Position: Goalkeeper

Youth career
- Borac Banja Luka
- –2013: Rad

Senior career*
Years	Team	Apps	(Gls)
2013–2018	Rad	28	(0)
2013	→ Srem Jakovo (loan)	7	(0)
2014–2015	→ Žarkovo (loan)	21	(0)
2018–2019	Zvijezda 09	4	(0)
2019–2020	Jedinstvo Bihać	2	(0)

International career
2011	Bosnia and Herzegovina U17	1	(0)
- * Club domestic league appearances and goals as of 1 September 2019

Darko Dejanović (Serbian Cyrillic: Дарко Дејановић; born 17 March 1995) is a Bosnian Serb professional footballer who most recently played as a goalkeeper for NK Jedinstvo Bihać in the First League of the Federation of Bosnia and Herzegovina.

== Club career ==
=== Rad ===
Born in Banja Luka, then already capital of Republika Srpska, Dejanović played with youth categories of biggest local club FK Borac Banja Luka. His talent was spotted in Serbia by none less than FK Rad which sent him to their youth academy known as one of the best in the region. Shortly after he joined the main team. He started his senior career with Srem Jakovo, as a loaned player of FK Rad.

Dejanović spent a period between 2014 and 2015 playing with Žarkovo, where he also appeared as a loaned player. In April 2015, Dejanović signed his first professional contract with FK Rad. He made his Serbian SuperLiga debut in 29th fixture of the 2014–15 season. After Boris Radunović's departure, Dejanović started 2015–16 season as a first choice in front of goal, so he changed his squad number and took the number 1.

Later, during the season, Rad signed Miloš Budaković and Nenad Filipović, so Dejanović made just 10 league and 1 cup appearances. He returned in the starting squad for the 4th fixture match of the 2016–17 Serbian SuperLiga, against Radnik Surdulica. He played 9 matches between August and October 2016, but later missed the rest of first half-season because of back surgery. With the end of May 2018, Dejanović mutually terminated a contract with Rad, and left the club as a free agent.

=== Zvijezda 09 ===
In July 2018, Dejanović signed with Premier League of Bosnia and Herzegovina club FK Zvijezda 09. He made his debut for Zvijezda 09 on 25 August 2018, in a 0–4 home league loss against FK Sarajevo.

=== Jedinstvo Bihać ===
In August 2019, Dejanović signed a contract with First League of FBiH club NK Jedinstvo Bihać. He made his official debut for Jedinstvo on 17 August 2019, in a 4–1 away league loss against NK Metalleghe-BSI.

== International career ==
Dejanović made 1 appearance for the Bosnia and Herzegovina U17 national team in 2011.

== Career statistics ==
=== Club ===
As of match played 1 September 2019

Appearances and goals by club, season and competition
Club	Season	League			Cup		Continental		Other		Total	
Club	Season	Division	Apps	Goals	Apps	Goals	Apps	Goals	Apps	Goals	Apps	Goals
Srem Jakovo (loan)	2013–14	Serbian League Belgrade	7	0	—		—		—		7	0
Žarkovo (loan)	2013–14	Serbian League Belgrade	10	0	—		—		—		10	0
Žarkovo (loan)	2014–15	Serbian League Belgrade	11	0	—		—		—		11	0
Žarkovo (loan)	Total		21	0	—		—		—		21	0
Rad	2013–14	SuperLiga	0	0	0	0	—		—		0	0
Rad	2014–15	SuperLiga	2	0	0	0	—		—		2	0
Rad	2015–16	SuperLiga	10	0	1	0	—		—		11	0
Rad	2016–17	SuperLiga	9	0	0	0	—		—		9	0
Rad	2017–18	SuperLiga	7	0	1	0	—		—		8	0
Rad	Total		28	0	2	0	—		—		30	0
Zvijezda 09	2018–19	Bosnian Premier League	4	0	0	0	—		—		4	0
Jedinstvo Bihać	2019–20	First League of FBiH	2	0	0	0	—		—		2	0
Career total			62	0	2	0	—		—		64	0
