= Maccabi Rehovot (handball) =

Israeli handball club

מכבי רחובות Maccabi Rehovot
- Full name: Maccabi Rehovot
- Founded: 1930
- Arena: Katzir hall
- Capacity: 700
- President: Moti Margalit and Voluntary association
- Head coach: Joe Matatya
- League: Ligat Winner Big
- 2015-16: 1st (promoted)

Maccabi Rehovot is a handball team from the city of Rehovot, Israel.

Maccabi won the first championship of Israel and were the biggest handball club in the country at the 1950s and early 1960s, they won 5 championships and have appeared in the finals of the Israeli cup numerous times.

In 2005 the team was rebuilt after 3 years of not competing, they got promoted back the top division in 2010.

== Titles ==
- Israel Champions (5): 1954, 1955, 1956, 1959, 1963
