= Meitetsu DeKi 300 =

Japanese electric locomotive type

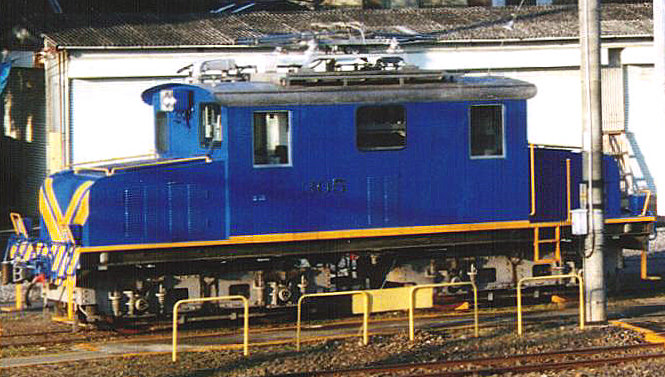
- DeKi 305 in November 2002
Type and origin
- Power type: Electric
- Builder: Nippon Sharyo, Mitsubishi
- Build date: 1923–1929
- Total produced: 6
Specifications
- Configuration
  - UIC: Bo-Bo
- Gauge: 1,067 mm (3 ft 6 in)
- Length: 10,152 mm (33 ft 3.7 in)
- Width: 2,678 mm (8 ft 9.4 in)
- Loco weight: 30.5 t
- Electric system/s: 1,500 V DC
- Current pickup(s): overhead wire
- Traction motors: 60 kW x 4
Performance figures
- Power output: 240 kW
Career
- Operators: Meitetsu
- Number in class: 6
- Numbers: DeKi 301-306
- Locale: Aichi Prefecture
- Disposition: Operational

The Meitetsu DeKi 300 (名鉄デキ300形, Meitetsu Deki 300-gata) is a Bo-Bo wheel arrangement electric locomotive type operated by private railway operator Nagoya Railroad (Meitetsu) in Japan. The locomotives were used primarily on track maintenance trains, but following their withdrawal in 2014, only one locomotive, DeKi 303, remains in use, limited to depot shunting duties at Meitetsu's Maigi Maintenance Depot.

== History ==
The locomotives were built between 1926 and 1929 for the Mikawa Railroad, and classified Class Ki 10. Locomotives Ki 10 and Ki 11 were built by Nippon Sharyo, and locomotives Ki 12 to Ki 14 were built by Mitsubishi Shipbuilding (now part of Mitsubishi Heavy Industries. A sixth locomotive, Ki 15, was added to the fleet with the purchase of the former Ichibata Electric Railway DeKi 1, built in 1923 by Mitsubishi. The locomotives were reclassified DeKi 300 following the merger of Mikawa Railroad into Nagoya Railroad (Meitetsu) in 1941.

Originally painted in black, the locomotives were repainted into "Meitetsu Blue" when they underwent life extension refurbishment in 1993.

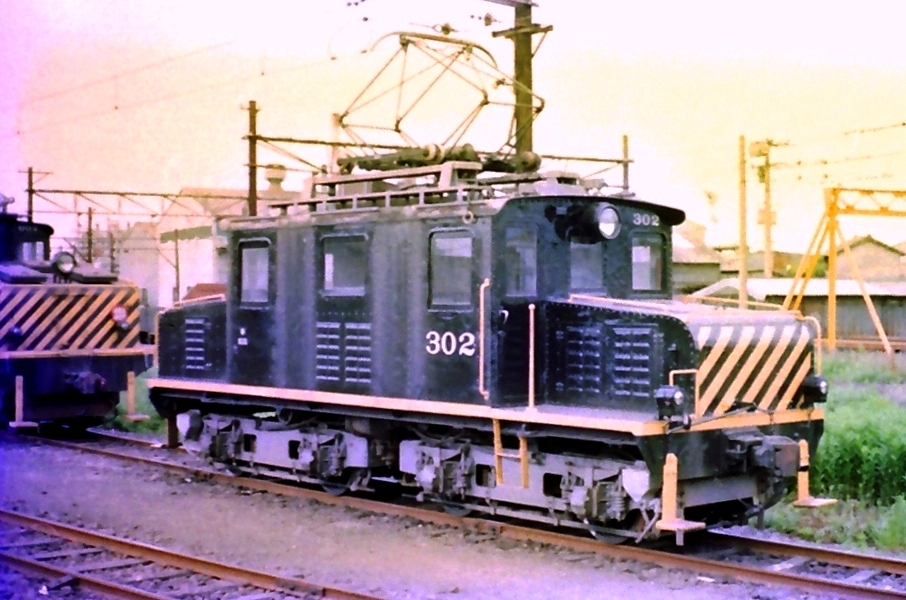
DeKi 302 in original black livery

=== Withdrawals ===
DeKi 304 was scrapped following fire damage in 1964. DeKi 301 was scrapped following damage sustained in a level crossing accident in 1966. DeKi 302 was withdrawn in 1984, after becoming surplus to requirements due to the reduction in freight operations.

The last three locomotives in service, DeKi 303, 305, and 306, were withdrawn from main line service in March 2014. While DeKi 305 and 306 were cut up, DeKi 303 remains in use as an internal shunting locomotive at Meitetsu's Maigi Maintenance Depot.

== Preserved examples ==
DeKi 302 was preserved in a park in the city of Toyota, following its withdrawal in 1984, but it was cut up in 2003.
