= Ligat Ha'Al (handball) =

Premier handball league of Israel

Ligat Winner
- Founded: 1954
- No. of teams: 12
- Country: Israel
- Confederation: EHF
- Most recent champion: Ramat Hasharon (2025-26)
- Most titles: Hapoel Rishon Lezion (19 titles)
- Broadcaster: Sport 5
- Sponsor: Winner Corporation
- Relegation to: Liga Leumit
- International cups: Champions League; EHF Cup
- Website: handballisr.co.il

Ligat Ha'Al (Hebrew: ליגת העל בכדוריד lit. 'The Super League in Handball') is the top Israeli professional handball league. The league is sponsored by Winner Corporation since 2010 and known also as Ligat Winner. Founded in 1954, the league currently consists of 12 teams and managed by the Israel Handball Association. Maccabi Rehovot was the first team to win the championship, while Hapoel Rishon Lezion is most successful club with 18 titles over the years. The league games are broadcast by Sport 5 channel.

== History ==
The league was established in 1954–55 with 10 teams competing in a double round-robin tournament, and with Maccabi Rehovot winning the first three championships. At first, all matches were played as Field handball, with 11 players on the field, before reverting to 7-players handball, with the last matches being held on football fields were held in 1963. Until the 1980s, the handball in Israel was centered in places such as Rehovot, Ramat Gan and Petah Tikva, as 7 clubs played in these cities. But starting in the 1980s, the hegemony moved to Rishon LeZion, as local Maccabi won three titles in a row between 1984 and 1986. Important clubs like Hapoel Rehovot were dissolved because of financial issues. The three cities which were very successful in the Israeli handball, Rehovot, Ramat Gan and Petah Tikva, deteriorated.

Through all the 1990s, Hapoel Rishon indisputably dominated the league and won 9 championship in a row. They enjoyed from the dissolution of the Soviet Union and Yugoslavia and signed a lot of players who were famous in Europe such as Igor Bialik, Leonid Bernstein, Evgeni Oleinik and more. In 2002 Hapoel lost the championship to ASA Tel Aviv. One year later Hapoel won it again but the hegemony and the full domination in the handball ended when Maccabi Rishon with the notable head coach Gilad Maor grew stronger. Maccabi Rishon won their first championship in the new age in 2004, after they won ASA Tel Aviv in the final. Since then, for ten years, the championship stayed in Rishon LeZion and moved between Maccabi and Hapoel.

A lot of famous Israeli players played in the league, while the most famous is Idan Maimon, the all-time best Israeli player, with more than 3,500 goals. Other famous players: Doron Dayan, Amir Popko, Danny Turkenitz, Shlomo Hofman, Dudi Balsar, Harel Moritz, Akiva Lefler, Eyal Shur, Shachar Haber, Eitan Madmoni, Oleg Butenko, Benny Ne'eman Yoav Ne'eman, Chen Pomeranz and Avishay Smoler.

In 2013–14 Maccabi Tel Aviv won its first ever championship and it was the first time in 12 years that the championship moved away from Rishon LeZion. In 2014–15, Hapoel Rishon won an historic double after defeating Maccabi Rishon in the finals of Ligat Winner and State Cup. One year later, it was Maccabi Tel Aviv who won the national championship.

== Administration and structure ==
=== Teams ===
There are currently 12 teams in Ligat Ha'Al, as of 2016–17 season:

Team	Location	Arena	Capacity
HC Nes Ziona	Nes Ziona	New Zimerman Arena	420
Hapoel Ramat Gan	Ramat Gan	Zisman Arena	800
Ramat Hasharon HC	Ramat Hasharon	Oranim	700
ASA Tel Aviv	Tel Aviv	Tel Aviv University Sports Center	500
Bnei Herzliya	Herzliya	HaRishonim	500
HC Holon	Holon	Katzir	700
Hapoel Rishon LeZion	Rishon LeZion	Nahlat Yehuda Arena	600
Maccabi Rishon LeZion	Rishon LeZion	Beit Maccabi Sport Centre	1,500
Hapoel Ashdod	Ashdod	Mekif Tet	500
Maccabi Kiryat Motzkin	Kiryat Motzkin	Goshen	650
Irony Rehovot	Rehovot	Katzir	720
Maccabi Tel Aviv	Tel Aviv	Tichonet Sports Arena	1,000

=== Season ===
• A regular season of two rounds: 12 teams play in the league, competing in a double round-robin tournament. After the end of the regular season, the top 8 teams compete for the championship, with the top four teams being seeded.

• Playoffs semi-final: The teams which won a best-of-three series in the quarter-finals will qualify to the semi-finals. The winner in the series between the 1st place and the 8th place play against the winner in the series between the 4th and the 5th places. The winner in the series between the 2nd and the 7th places, play against the winner of the series between the 3rd and 6th places. In case of a draw in one of the matches, the tie is decided on goal difference with a 10 minutes extra time being played if the goal difference is equal. The home-court advantage is always given to the team that is ranked higher in the table of the regular season.

• Playoffs final: The final playoffs round is decided by a best-of-five series between the two semi-final winners. The higher-ranked team at the end of the regular season host the 1st, 3rd and 5th games of the series. A team wins three games is the national champion. If the two teams win in two games each, and the fifth games ends in a draw, the tie is decided on goal difference with a 10 minutes extra time being played if the goal difference is equal.

• Relegations: The bottom 4 teams compete in a single round-robin tournament to avoid relegation, with the bottom club relegating to Liga Leumit and the 10th and 11th placed teams compete in promotion/relegation playoffs against the 2nd and 3rd placed teams from Liga Leumit.

=== Sponsorships ===
In the 2000s the league was sponsored by Bank Yahav and called "Ligat Bank Yahav". Later in 2010, Winner Corporation signed a sponsorship contract with the league and the league name has been changed to "Ligat Winner".

== Champions ==
The complete list of the Israeli handball champions since 1955.

Season	Champion
1954–55	Maccabi Rehovot (1)
1955–56	Maccabi Rehovot (2)
1956–57	Maccabi Rehovot (3)
1957–58	Hapoel Rehovot (1)
1958–59	Maccabi Rishon LeZion (1)
1959–60	Maccabi Rehovot (4)
1960–61	Maccabi Ramat Gan (1)
1961–62	Hapoel Rehovot (2)
1962–63	Maccabi Rehovot (5)
1963–64	Hapoel Rehovot (3)
1964–65	Hapoel Rehovot (4)
1965–66	Hapoel Petah Tikva (1)
1966–67	Hapoel Petah Tikva (2)
1967–68	Hapoel Rehovot (5)
1968–69	Hapoel Ramat Gan (1)
1969–70	Hapoel Petah Tikva (3)
1970–71	Hapoel Ramat Gan (2)
1971–72	Hapoel Herzliya (1)
1972–73	Hapoel Rehovot (6)
1973–74	Not Held
1974–75	Hapoel Rehovot (7)
1975–76	Hapoel Rehovot (8)
1976–77	Hapoel Rehovot (9)
1977–78	Maccabi Petah Tikva (1)
1978–79	Hapoel Rehovot (10)
1979–89	Maccabi Petah Tikva (2)
1980–81	Maccabi Petah Tikva (3)
1981–82	Hapoel Rehovot (11)
1982–83	Hapoel Rehovot (12)
1983–84	Hapoel Rehovot (13)
1984–85	Maccabi Rishon LeZion (2)
1985–86	Maccabi Rishon LeZion (3)
1986–87	Maccabi Rishon LeZion (4)
1987–88	Hapoel Rishon LeZion (1)
1988–89	Maccabi Rishon LeZion (5)
1989–90	Hapoel Rishon LeZion (2)

Year	Champion
1990–91	Hapoel Rishon LeZion (3)
1991–92	Maccabi Rishon LeZion (6)
1992–93	Hapoel Rishon LeZion (4)
1993–94	Hapoel Rishon LeZion (5)
1994–95	Hapoel Rishon LeZion (6)
1995–96	Hapoel Rishon LeZion (7)
1996–97	Hapoel Rishon LeZion (8)
1997–98	Hapoel Rishon LeZion (9)
1998–99	Hapoel Rishon LeZion (10)
1999–2000	Hapoel Rishon LeZion (11)
2000–01	Hapoel Rishon LeZion (12)
2001–02	ASA Tel Aviv (1)
2002–03	Hapoel Rishon LeZion (13)
2003–04	Hapoel Rishon LeZion (14)
2004–05	Maccabi Rishon LeZion (7)
2005–06	Maccabi Rishon LeZion (8)
2006–07	Maccabi Rishon LeZion (9)
2007–08	Hapoel Rishon LeZion (15)
2008–09	Maccabi Rishon LeZion (10)
2009–10	Maccabi Rishon LeZion (11)
2010–11	Maccabi Rishon LeZion (12)
2011–12	Maccabi Rishon LeZion (13)
2012–13	Hapoel Rishon LeZion (16)
2013–14	Maccabi Tel Aviv (1)
2014–15	Hapoel Rishon LeZion (17)
2015–16	Maccabi Tel Aviv (2)
2016–17	Maccabi Rishon LeZion (14)
2017–18	Hapoel Rishon LeZion (18)
2018–19	Hapoel Ashdod (1)
2019–20	Maccabi Rishon LeZion (15)
2020–21	Maccabi Rishon LeZion (16)
2021–22	Hapoel Ashdod (2)
2022–23	Maccabi Rishon LeZion (17)
2023–24	HC Ramat HaSharon (1)
2024–25	Maccabi Rishon LeZion (18)
2025–26	HC Ramat HaSharon (2)

== See also ==
- Israeli Women's Handball League
