= Dusko Doder =

American journalist (1937–2024)

- Born: July 22, 1937; Sarajevo, Drina Banovina, Kingdom of Yugoslavia (now Bosnia and Herzegovina)
- Died: September 10, 2024 (aged 87); Chiang Mai, Thailand
- Education: Washington University in St. Louis (BA); Columbia University (MS, MA)
- Occupation: Journalist

Duško Doder (Serbian Cyrillic: Душко Додер; July 22, 1937 – September 10, 2024) was an American journalist. Born in Sarajevo and raised in Yugoslavia, he moved to the U.S. in 1959 after meeting his future mentor in Vienna and became a journalist. He worked for The Washington Post between 1970 and 1985, where he was the head of its Moscow bureau from 1981 until 1985, before spending three years at U.S. News & World Report as their Beijing correspondent. His career was permanently damaged in 1992 after Time published baseless allegations about him, for which they apologized four years later.

== Early life and education ==
Doder was born in Sarajevo on July 22, 1937, to Vaso Doder and Marija (née Gjurhu). Sarajevo and the broader Bosnia-Herzegovina region were part of the Kingdom of Yugoslavia at the time. Doder grew up in Yugoslavia, living through the Nazi invasion of Yugoslavia and the authoritarian Socialist Federal Republic of Yugoslavia that emerged after World War II. He learned English from listening to British and American radio broadcasts and spending one summer in the United Kingdom. He wrote for a Yugoslav newspaper before graduating from high school.

When his father sent him to Vienna for medical school, he took a job at a press club and met his future mentor, Clyde Farnsworth. Farnsworth, a reporter for the Associated Press, paid for Doder to travel to the United States. His family in St. Louis, Missouri, offered him a place to stay, and Doder enrolled in Washington University in St. Louis. Doder graduated in 1962 and did his graduate studies at Columbia University in New York City, earning master's degrees in journalism and international studies.

== Career ==
Doder's first stint in journalism was as a reporter for the Associated Press, working out of New Hampshire and Albany, New York. In 1968, United Press International hired Doder to work at its Moscow bureau. The Washington Post hired Doder as their Canada correspondent in 1970 and asked him three years later to move to its Belgrade bureau, where he would cover Eastern Europe, including his home country of Yugoslavia. Doder published his first book, The Yugoslavs, in 1978.

Doder became bureau chief of The Washington Post's Moscow bureau in 1981. During his time in Moscow, Doder developed an extensive network of connections and sources through his familiarity with Slavic and Soviet cultures and the Russian language. In February 1984, after observing hundreds of lights on at the Soviet Defense Ministry and a change to classical music on radio and television, he surmised correctly that Yuri Andropov, the then-current leader of the Soviet Union, was seriously ill or dead, which allowed the newspaper to run a story on Andropov's death on February 10, 1984, prior to the Kremlin's announcement of his death later that day.

Doder left Moscow in 1985, after which he took a hiatus from his work at the Post. He published his second book, Shadows and Whispers: Power Politics Inside the Kremlin From Brezhnev to Gorbachev, in 1986. Doder left the Post for good in 1987. From 1987 to 1990, Doder worked at U.S. News & World Report as Beijing correspondent, where he covered the Tiananmen Square protests in 1989. In the 1990s, Doder returned to Belgrade, where he wrote for various publications on the political and social shifts occurring during Yugoslavia's breakup.

In 1992, Time magazine published a story in which Soviet defector and former KGB colonel Vitaly Yurchenko suggested that Doder's successful time in Moscow was due to ties to the KGB. Investigations by the FBI, Russia's Foreign Intelligence Service, and The Washington Post found no evidence for the claims, and the Post continued to publicly defend Doder. Doder, who was working in Yugoslavia at the time, filed a libel suit in the United Kingdom against Time in 1993. During the legal proceedings, Doder sold his house to cover costs. In 1996, Time apologized to Doder and paid him $262,000. Doder's career never fully recovered following the accusations. Doder published a novel, The Firebird Affair, in 2011, and co-wrote the memoir The Inconvenient Journalist with Louise Branson, his wife, which was published in 2021.

== Personal life and death ==
Doder married twice. He had one son with his first wife, Karin Weberg Rasmussen (died 1994); the couple divorced in the early 1980s. He married his second wife, British journalist Louise Branson, in 1989, and the couple had two sons. Doder and Branson lived in Northern Virginia until 2020, when the couple moved to Thailand. Doder died from Lewy body dementia in Chiang Mai, on September 10, 2024, at the age of 87.

== Books ==
- The Yugoslavs. New York, Toronto: Random House. 1978. ISBN 978-0394425382. Review
- Shadows and Whispers: Power Politics Inside the Kremlin From Brezhnev to Gorbachev. Random House. 1986. ISBN 978-0394549989.
- with Louise Branson, Gorbachev: Heretic in the Kremlin (1991)
- with Louise Branson Milosevic: Portrait of a Tyrant (1991)
- The Firebird Affair (2011)
- with Louise Branson, The Inconvenient Journalist (2021)
