= Hapoel Ashdod (handball) =

Israeli handball team

מועדון כדוריד הפועל אשדוד Handball Club Hapoel Ashdod
- Full name: Handball Club Hapoel Ashdod
- Founded: 1967
- Arena: Mekif Tet
- Capacity: 500
- Head coach: Assaf Levy
- League: Winner League
- Club colours
Home	Away

Hapoel Ashdod (Hebrew: הפועל אשדוד), is a professional handball club from the city of Ashdod, Israel. They compete in the Israeli Handball League, within the Israeli first division.

Location of Hapoel Ashdod

== History ==
In 1967, when the club was first formed, they played in the second division; for an intermediate period, they played in the third division, but returned to their earlier position in 2008. At the end of 2010/11 season, for the first time in its history, the team reached the first division. During its history, it has won 2 national championships (in 2019 and 2022), 3 national Cups (in 2021, 2022 and 2023).

== Crest, colours, supporters ==
=== Kits ===
HOME
2022–23	2023–24

AWAY
2022–23	2023–24

== Team ==
=== Current squad ===
Squad for the 2023–24 season

Hapoel Ashdod

Goalkeepers

- 1 (Israel) Oren Meirovich
- 12 (Croatia) Vladimir Božić
- 63 (Israel) Oz Itzhak

Left Wingers

- 11 (Israel) Or Farkash

Right Wingers

- 8 (Israel) Lou Axebrud
- 24 (Israel) Amit Stelman
- 98 (Israel) Philip Irovich

Line Players

- 33 (Serbia) Filip Leovac

Central Backs

- 17 (Israel) Omri Kushmaro (c)
- 32 (Israel) Itay Suissa

Left Backs

- 7 (Serbia) Aleksandar Babić
- 21 (Israel) Niv Levy
- 22 (Israel) Roi Avraham Solomon

Right Backs

- 3 (Serbia) Uroš Todorović
- 14 (Israel) Shon Meir Solomon

=== Technical staff ===
- Head Coach: (Israel) Assaf Levy
- Assistant Coach: (Israel) Amir Dan
- Physiotherapist: (Israel) Saidov Natanel

=== Transfers ===
Transfers for the 2023–24 season

Joining

- (Serbia) Vuk Milenković (LP) from (Serbia) RK Metaloplastika
- (Serbia) Filip Grubor (LP) from (Serbia) RK Radnički Kragujevac
- (Israel) Roi Avraham Solomon (LB) from (Israel) HC Holon
- (Israel) Shon Meir Solomon (RB) from (Israel) HC Holon
- (Croatia) Vladimir Božić (GK) from (Germany) ASV Hamm-Westfalen
- (Serbia) Uroš Todorović (RB) from (Germany) HBW Balingen-Weilstetten
- (Serbia) Filip Leovac (LP) from (Israel) Hapoel Kiryat Ono

Leaving

- (Serbia) Svetislav Verkić (GK) to (Switzerland) HSC Suhr Aarau
- (Serbia) Dalibor Sukić (LP)
- (Montenegro) Risto Vujačić (RB) to (Israel) Ramat Hasharon HC
- (Israel) Aviv Leifer (LW) to (Israel) Maccabi Rishon LeZion
- (Israel) Shon Morohov (GK) to (Israel) Handball Club Holon
- (Israel) Shon Livshitz (GK)
- (Israel) Omer Gera (LP)
- (Israel) Ori Guez (LB)
- (Israel) Ofir Cohen (CB)
- (Serbia) Vuk Milenković (LP)
- (Serbia) Filip Grubor (LP) to (Israel) Bnei Herzliya

== Previous squads ==
2021–2022 Team
Shirt No	Nationality	Player	Birth Date	Position
1	Serbia	Igor Arsić	19 October 1989 (age 36)	Goalkeeper
2	Israel	Guy Korodva	7 November 1994 (age 31)	Right Winger
3	Israel	Asaf Ben Guzi	24 September 1998 (age 27)	Left Winger
5	Israel	Omer Gera	28 July 1992 (age 33)	Line Player
7	Serbia	Aleksandar Babić	28 October 1993 (age 32)	Left Back
8	Israel	Lou Axebrud	4 February 2001 (age 24)	Right Winger
9	Israel	Ori Guez	19 November 2002 (age 23)	Left Back
10	Montenegro	Risto Vujačić	4 December 1993 (age 32)	Right Back
11	Israel	Yossi Biterman	3 October 1993 (age 32)	Line Player
15	Israel	Yarin Naten Liberman	7 October 2004 (age 21)	Left Winger
17	Israel	Omri Kushmaro	29 December 1994 (age 31)	Central Back
21	Israel	Niv Levy	8 June 1993 (age 32)	Left Back
24	Israel	Amit Stelman	9 January 1993 (age 32)	Right Winger
30	Israel	Naor Cohen	22 September 2004 (age 21)	Line Player
31	Israel	Or Farkash	10 March 2000 (age 25)	Left Winger
32	Israel	Itay Suissa	20 May 2001 (age 24)	Central Back
45	Israel	Shahar Levin	11 January 1994 (age 31)	Left Winger
63	Israel	Oz Itzhak	14 March 1998 (age 27)	Goalkeeper
89	Israel	Shon Morohov	5 April 2004 (age 21)	Goalkeeper

== Titles ==
- Winner League
  - Winner (2) : 2019, 2022
- Israel Handball Cup
  - Winner (3) : 2021, 2022, 2023

== EHF ranking ==
As of 5/12/2025

Rank	Team	Points
210	European University Cyprus	27
211	(Faroe Islands) Stranda ÍF	26
212	(North Macedonia) RK Metalurg Skopje	26
213	(Israel) Hapoel Ashdod	26
214	(Spain) BM Valladolid	26
215	(Russia) SGAU-Saratov	25
216	(Ukraine) HC Odessa	25

== Former club members ==
=== Notable former players ===
- (Croatia) Vladimir Božić (2024–)
- (Germany) Gabor Langhans (2018–2021)
- (Hungary) (Serbia) Milorad Krivokapić (2016–2017)
- (North Macedonia) Darko Dimitrievski (2018)
- (Montenegro) Žarko Pejović (2019–2020)
- (Slovenia) David Špiler (2019–2020)
- (Serbia) Tihomir Doder (2014–2017)
- (Serbia) Tomislav Stojković (2019–2020)
- (Serbia) Svetislav Verkić (2022–2023)

=== Former coaches ===
Seasons	Coach	Country
2017–2021	Oleg Butenko	(Moldova) (Israel)
2021–2023	Andreja Vukojević	(Serbia)
2023	Nedeljko Matić	(Serbia)
2023–2024	Amir Dan	(Israel)
2024–	Assaf Levy	(Israel)
