= Hapoel Petah Tikva (handball) =

Israeli handball club

הפועל פתח תקווה Hapoel Petah Tikva
- Full name: Hapoel Petah Tikva
- Founded: 1950's
- Arena: Ironi hall, Petah Tikva
- Capacity: 900
- President: WEISS ZACHI and Voluntary association
- Head coach: KALOZ'NI TAL
- League: Liga Leumit
- 2019/2020: 2 (Relegated)
- Club colours

Hapoel Petah Tikva is a handball team from the city of Petah Tikva, Israel.

Hapoel is one of the oldest handball clubs in the country, the most successful period was in the late-1960s and early-1970s when the team won 3 championships.

The last time Petah Tikva played in the top division was in the 1996-97 season, they finished 12 out 14 and did not manage to win the relegation playoff.

In August 1997 Hapoel merged with Maccabi Petah Tikva and played as Ironi Petah Tikva for 12 seasons in the top division. In September 2009 the merger was over as the supporters of Hapoel reformed their team.

== Notable supporters ==
- Avram Grant

== Titles ==
- Israel Champions (3): 1966, 1967, 1970

LIGA LEUMIT Champions 2014/2015 THE ISRAELI BERNER CUP 2014/2015
