= Maccabi Rishon LeZion (handball) =

Israeli handball team

מכבי ראשון לציון Maccabi Rishon LeZion
- Full name: Maccabi Rishon LeZion
- Founded: 1950
- Arena: Beit Maccabi Sport Centre
- Capacity: 1,500
- President: Arik Alcalay
- League: Winner League
- Club colours
Home	Away

Maccabi Rishon LeZion (Hebrew: מכבי ראשון לציון) is a professional handball club from the city of Rishon LeZion, Israel. They compete in the Israeli Handball League, within the Israeli first division.

Location of Maccabi Rishon LeZion

== History ==
Maccabi Rishon Lezion was founded in 1950 by Danny Reingold, Mishka Davidson, Mena Davidson, Prof. Arnon Sofer and Motella Rosenstein. He won his first championship in 1959. In 1964, the club disbanded for one season and was re-established a season later. The team's biggest achievement in the European Cups was on its first appearance there in 1983 when it reached the EHF Cup Winners' Cup semifinal, losing to the Spanish team FC Barcelona. After some bad years in the 1990s, the team returned to success: between 2003 and 2007 it won three championships and four cups. During its history, it won 18 national championships (in 1959, 1985, 1986, 1987, 1989, 1992, 2005, 2006, 2007, 2009, 2010, in 2011, 2012, 2013, 2015, 2017, 2021 and 2023), 12 national cups (1983, 1986, 1987, 1988, 2003, 2004, 2006, 2007, 2011, 2013, 2014 and 2019).

Their biggest rival is Hapoel Rishon LeZion, another great Rishon LeZion team. The derby games between them have been very tense throughout the last two decades.

== Crest, colours, supporters ==
=== Kits ===
HOME

2022–23

AWAY

2022–23

== Sports Hall information ==
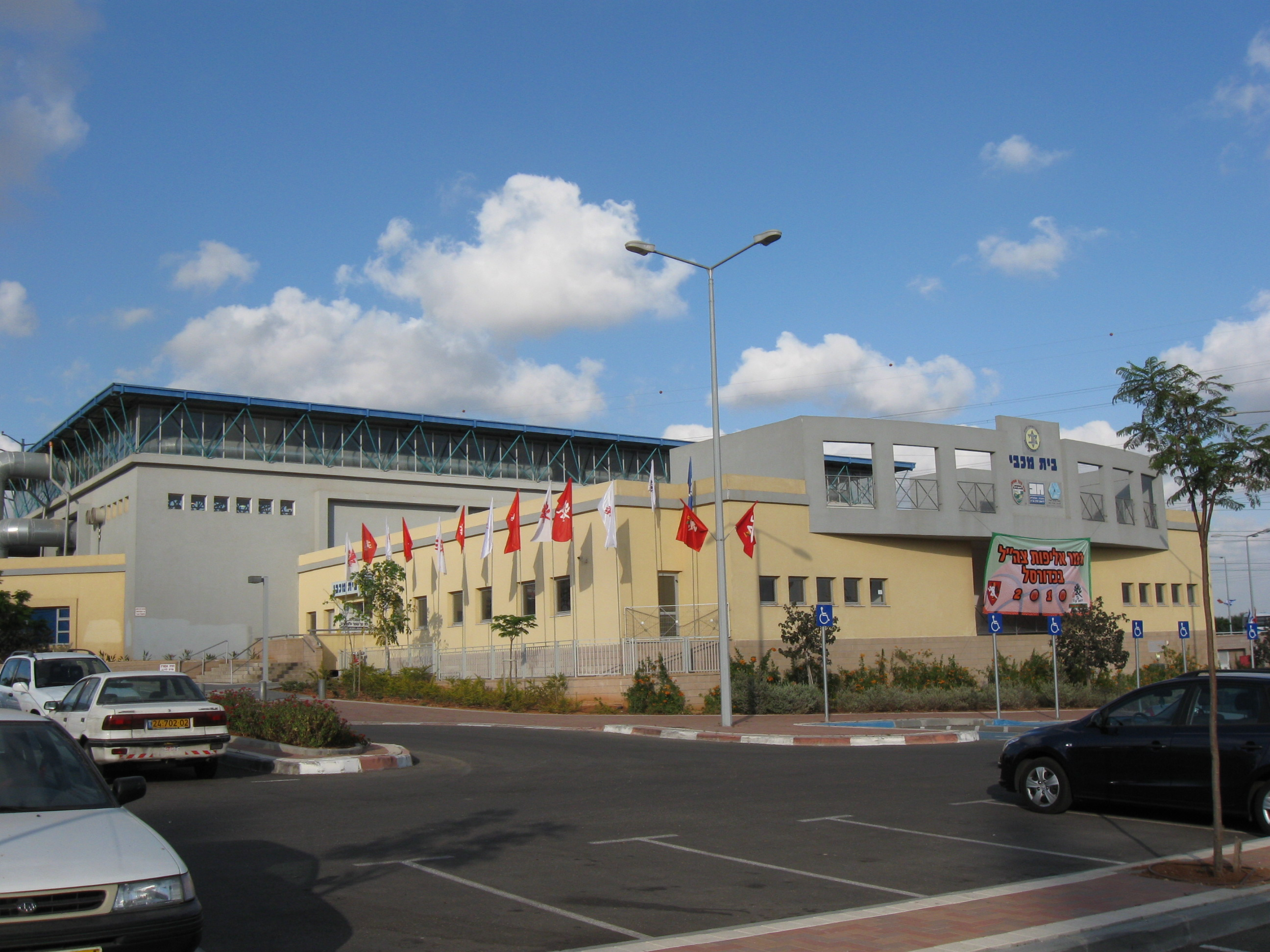
Home hall: Beit Maccabi Sport Centre

- Arena: - Beit Maccabi Sport Centre
- City: - Rishon LeZion
- Capacity: - 1500
- Address: - Golda Meir 21. 25002 Rishon LeZion, Israel

== Team ==
=== Current squad ===
Squad for the 2023–24 season

Maccabi Rishon LeZion

Goalkeepers

- 1 (North Macedonia) Gradimir Čanevski
- 16 (Israel) Eitan Elbaz
- 27 (Israel) Tal Yossi Ilioukhine

Left Wingers

- 9 (Israel) Aviv Leifer
- 20 (Israel) Ravid Noyman
- 24 (Israel) Nadav Nizri

Right Wingers

- 14 (Israel) Alon Shulman
- 18 (Israel) Idan Mena
- 55 (Israel) Guy Gera

Line Players

- 13 (Israel) Itay Yakov Schvaifel
- 33 (Israel) Gal Azriel
- 79 (Israel) Adi Cohen

Central Backs

- 11 (Israel) Noy Fayerman
- 19 (Russia) Pavel Atman
- 29 (Bosnia and Herzegovina) Ivan Karačić
- 35 (Israel) Itay Shalma

Left Backs

- 10 (Israel) Yizhak Meloul

Right Backs

- 8 (Israel) Yermiyahu Sidi

=== Technical staff ===
- Physiotherapist: (Israel) Nelly Aminov

=== Transfers ===
Transfers for the 2023–24 season

Joining

- (Israel) Aviv Leifer (LW) from (Israel) Hapoel Ashdod
- (Israel) Alon Shulman (RW)

Leaving

- (Israel) Moshe Elimelech (GK) to (Israel) Handball Club Holon
- (Israel) Amit Motola (RW)
- (Israel) Sharon Peres Shalem (LW)
- (Israel) Kesem Amiel (LW)
- (Israel) Yonatan Hadar (RB)
- (Bosnia and Herzegovina) Gafar Hadžiomerović (LP) to (Switzerland) HSC Kreuzlingen

== Previous squads ==
2018–2019 Team
Shirt No	Nationality	Player	Birth Date	Position
2	Israel	Snir Natsia	26 August 1999 (age 26)	Line Player
3	Israel	Yoav Neeman	6 January 1980 (age 46)	Right Winger
5	Israel	Omer Gera	28 July 1992 (age 33)	Line Player
7	Israel	Bar Masuri	23 October 1990 (age 35)	Left Winger
8	Israel	Yermiyahu Sidi	14 January 1994 (age 32)	Right Back
9	Croatia	Marko Matić	25 January 1988 (age 38)	Left Back
10	Israel	Vladislav Kofman	16 April 1988 (age 38)	Central Back
11	Serbia	Rastko Stojković	12 July 1981 (age 44)	Line Player
12	Romania	Vasile Iulian Strat	1 January 1975 (age 51)	Goalkeeper
13	Israel	Yonatan Rosental	18 August 1989 (age 36)	Left Winger
14	Israel	Dan Tepper	4 March 1994 (age 32)	Goalkeeper
18	Israel	Daniel Andres Friedmann	19 November 1990 (age 35)	Right Winger
22	Israel	Ram Turkenitz	26 September 1995 (age 30)	Left Back
24	Israel	Amit Stelman	9 January 1993 (age 33)	Right Winger
29	Bosnia and Herzegovina	Ivan Karačić	26 May 1985 (age 40)	Central Back
32	Israel	Eldar Shikloshi	5 March 1990 (age 36)	Goalkeeper
55	Israel	Rotem Segal	29 June 1999 (age 26)	Right Back
89	Israel	Kesem Amiel	3 January 2000 (age 26)	Left Winger

2016–2017 Team
Shirt No	Nationality	Player	Birth Date	Position
3	Israel	Yoav Neeman	6 January 1980 (age 46)	Right Winger
5	Israel	Omer Gera	28 July 1992 (age 33)	Line Player
7	Croatia	Robert Markotić	7 March 1990 (age 36)	Right Back
9	Israel	Gal Moshe Avraham	15 August 1981 (age 44)	Left Winger
10	Israel	Vladislav Kofman	16 April 1988 (age 38)	Central Back
11	Israel	Dor Pinhas Kalderon	28 July 1995 (age 30)	Central Back
12	Romania	Vasile Iulian Strat	1 January 1975 (age 51)	Goalkeeper
15	Israel	Dor Geva	12 March 1990 (age 36)	Left Winger
16	Israel	Raz Zecharia	31 July 1997 (age 28)	Goalkeeper
18	Israel	Daniel Andres Friedmann	19 November 1990 (age 35)	Right Winger
19	Israel	Roee Biton	2 October 1990 (age 35)	Left Winger
23	Slovenia	Rok Praznik	15 March 1980 (age 46)	Central Back
24	Israel	Amit Stelman	9 January 1993 (age 33)	Right Winger
26	Israel	Tal Gera	20 November 1995 (age 30)	Line Player
29	Bosnia and Herzegovina	Ivan Karačić	26 May 1985 (age 40)	Central Back
32	Israel	Eldar Shikloshi	5 March 1990 (age 36)	Goalkeeper
55	Israel	Rotem Segal	29 June 1999 (age 26)	Right Back
91	Israel	Matan Golz	10 January 1994 (age 32)	Central Back
99	Serbia	David Rašić	4 December 1986 (age 39)	Left Back

== Titles ==
- Winner League
  - Winner (18) : 1959, 1985, 1986, 1987, 1989, 1992, 2005, 2006, 2007, 2009, 2010, 2011, 2012, 2013, 2015, 2017, 2021, 2023
- Israel Handball Cup
  - Winner (12) : 1983, 1986, 1987, 1988, 2003, 2004, 2006, 2007, 2011, 2013, 2014, 2019

== EHF ranking ==
As of 6/3/2024

Rank	Team	Points
110	(Belarus) SKA Minsk	44
111	(Germany) MT Melsungen	44
112	(Finland) BK-46	44
113	(Israel) Maccabi Rishon LeZion	43
114	(Luxembourg) Handball Käerjeng	42
115	(Bosnia and Herzegovina) RK Vogošća	42
116	(Russia) Dinamo Viktor Stavropol	42

== Former club members ==
=== Notable former players ===
- (Bosnia and Herzegovina) Ivan Karačić (2016–)
- (Croatia) Robert Markotić (2016–2017)
- (Croatia) Marko Matić (2018–2019)
- (Hungary) (Serbia) Milorad Krivokapić (2014–2015)
- (Montenegro) (Serbia) Radivoje Ristanović (2017–2018)
- (Romania) Silviu Băiceanu (2011)
- (Russia) Pavel Atman (2022–)
- (Slovenia) Rok Praznik (2016–2017)
- (Slovenia) (North Macedonia) Renato Vugrinec (2015–2016)
- (Spain) Luis Felipe Jiménez Reina (2017–2018)
- (Serbia) (Montenegro) Branko Kankaraš (2021–2022)
- (Serbia) Duško Milinović (2008–2009)
- (Serbia) Rastko Stojković (2018–2019)
