= Hapoel Ramat Gan (handball) =

Israeli handball club

הפועל רמת גן Hapoel Ramat Gan
- Full name: Hapoel Ramat Gan
- Founded: 1950's
- Arena: Zisman
- Capacity: 800
- President: Beni Kaminer
- Head coach: Arik Shapira
- League: Liga Leumit
- 2015/16: 9

Hapoel Ramat Gan is a handball team from the city of Ramat Gan, Israel.

Hapoel was one of the biggest handball club in Israel until the mid-1980s, they won 2 championships and 8 Israeli cups.

They now compete in Liga Leumit which is the second division in Israeli handball competition.

== Titles ==
- Israel Champions (2): 1969, 1971
- Israel Cup Holder (8): 1966, 1968, 1969, 1970, 1971, 1972, 1975, 1976
