= Hapoel Rishon LeZion (handball) =

Israeli Handball Team

הפועל ראשון לציון Hapoel Rishon LeZion
- Founded: 1968
- Arena: Nahalat Yehuda hall
- Capacity: 600
- President: (Israel) Dudi Falah, Ami Sade
- Head coach: (Israel) Asaf Siton
- Captain: (Israel) Tomer Bodenheimer
- League: Ligat Winner
- 2024/2025: Champion, 3 in Regular season
- Club colours
Home	Away

Hapoel Rishon LeZion (Hebrew: הפועל ראשון לציון, is a professional handball team from the city of Rishon LeZion, Israel. competes in the Ligat Winner Big. The team's colors are red and white, and it hosts its home games in Nahalat Yehuda hall. The captain of the team is Tomer Bodenheimer.

The team was founded in 1968 and since then has become a regular member of the first division and the most successful team in Israeli handball, having won a record 18 league titles, a record 16 Israeli cups. The team has also participated in the EHF Champions League in 1998, 2000 and in 2001.

Their biggest rival is Maccabi Rishon LeZion, another great Rishon LeZion team. The derby games between them have been very tense throughout the last two decades.

== Titles ==
- Israel Champions (19): 1988, 1990, 1991, 1993, 1994, 1995, 1996, 1997, 1998, 1999, 2000, 2001, 2003, 2004, 2008, 2013, 2015, 2018, 2025
- Israel Cup Holder (16): 1989, 1990, 1991, 1992, 1993, 1994, 1995, 1996, 1997, 1998, 1999, 2001, 2012, 2015, 2016, 2018

== European competition ==
EHF Champions League:

- 1993/94: 1/8-finals
- 1994/95: 1/16-finals
- 1995-96: 1/16-finals
- 1996/97: 1/16-finals
- 1997/98: Group stage
- 1998/99: 1/16-finals
- 1999/00: 1/4-finals
- 2000/01: 2nd qualifying round
- 2001/02: Group stage

EHF Cup Winners' Cup:

- 1993/94: 1/8-finals
- 2002/03: 3rd round

EHF Cup:

- 2000/01: Round 4
- 2008/09: Round 2
- 2010/11: Round 3

== Squad ==
Squad for the 2025–26 season

Goalkeeper

- 1 (Israel) Lior Kaplan
- 12 (Serbia) Svetislav Verkić
- 16 (Israel) Amit Meroz

Wingers

- 5 (Israel) Yaish Shalev
- 23 (Israel) Ben Gonen
- 31 (Israel) Asaf Sharon
- 44 (Israel) Eddie Kirkirus
- 77 (Israel) Daniel Moldovan

Line players

- 8 (Germany) Erik Schmidt
- 17 (Israel) Tomer Bodenheimer (c)
- 95 (Israel) Nevo Mesika

Back players

- 3 (Israel) Tal Eckstein
- 11 (Israel) Dor Calderon
- 13 (Israel) Lior Gurman
- 14 (Israel) Ofir Cohen
- 22 (Israel) Amir Shneider
- 24 (Israel) Nadav Haviv
- 29 (Bosnia and Herzegovina) Ivan Karačić
- 81 (Israel) Yonatan Pelach

== Notable former players ==
- (Serbia) (Hungary) Milorad Krivokapić
- (Montenegro) Draško Mrvaljević
- (Serbia) Bojan Butulija
- (Bosnia and Herzegovina) Bojan Ljubišić
- (Serbia) Tomislav Stojković
- (Serbia) Miloš Dragaš
- (North Macedonia) Renato Vugrinec
- (Croatia) Josip Šandrk
- (Serbia) Novak Bošković
- (Serbia) Savo Mešter
- (Bosnia and Herzegovina) Duško Čelica
- (Bosnia and Herzegovina) Peđa Dejanović
- (Israel) Avishay Smoler
- (Israel) Idan Maimon
- (Israel) Yotam Tal
- (Serbia) Nemanja Pribak
- (Croatia) Antonio Pribanić
- (Montenegro) Vasko Ševaljević
- (Belarus) Aleh Astrashapkin
