= 2012–13 EHF Champions League group stage =

This article describes the group stage of the 2012–13 EHF Champions League.

== Format ==
The 24 teams were split into four groups, consisting of six teams. Each team played a home and away game against all opponents in the group. The first four ranked teams advanced to the knockout stage.

== Seedings ==
The draw for the group stage took place at the Gartenhotel Altmannsdorf in Vienna on 6 July 2012 at 11:00 local time. A total of 24 teams were drawn into four groups of six. Teams were divided into six pots, based on EHF coefficients. Clubs from the same pot or the same association could not be drawn into the same group, except the wild card tournament winner, which did not enjoy any protection.

Pot 1 (Germany) THW Kiel^{TH} (Denmark) AG København^{1} (Spain) Barcelona (France) Montpellier	Pot 2 (Croatia) Zagreb (Hungary) MKB Veszprém (Russia) Chekhovskiye Medvedi (Slovenia) Gorenje	Pot 3 (Spain) Atlético Madrid (Germany) Flensburg (Poland) Vive Targi Kielce (Switzerland) Kadetten Schaffhausen	Pot 4 (Spain) Ademar León (France) Chambéry (Germany) Füchse Berlin (Sweden) IK Sävehof	Pot 5 (Hungary) Pick Szeged (Russia) St. Petersburg (Slovenia) Celje Pivovarna Laško (Belarus) Dinamo-Minsk	Pot 6 (Serbia) Partizan ^{Q} (North Macedonia) Metalurg Skopje ^{Q} (Romania) HCM Constanța ^{Q} (Germany) HSV Hamburg ^{WC}

th Title holder. The title holder automatically gets the top position of seeding list.

^{Q} Qualified through qualification tournament

^{WC} Qualified through wild card tournament

Notes

- Note 1: AG København was seeded in pot 1 for the 2012–13 EHF Champions League group stage draw, which took place in Vienna, Austria, on 6 July 2012. However, the club filed for bankruptcy on July 31, 2012, and their place in the group stage was awarded to Bjerringbro-Silkeborg.

== Groups ==
Key to colours in group tables
Top four placed teams advanced to the knockout stage.

Times up to 27 October 2012 (matchdays 1–4) are CEST (UTC+2), thereafter (matchdays 5–10) times are CET (UTC+1).

=== Group A ===
Team	Pld	W	D	L	GF	GA	GD	Pts
(Germany) HSV Hamburg	10	7	2	1	313	272	+41	16
(Germany) Flensburg	10	6	3	1	310	279	+31	15
(Russia) Chekhovskiye Medvedi	10	5	4	1	310	282	+28	14
(Spain) Ademar León	10	3	1	6	265	292	−27	7
(France) Montpellier	10	2	2	6	301	311	−10	6
(Serbia) Partizan	10	1	0	9	268	331	−63	2

27 September 2012; 19:00	Flensburg (Germany)	37 – 37	(France) Montpellier	Campushalle, Flensburg; Attendance: 3,414; Referees: Gubica, Milošević (CRO)
27 September 2012; 19:00	Eggert Jensen 8	(19–18)	Gajić 8	Campushalle, Flensburg; Attendance: 3,414; Referees: Gubica, Milošević (CRO)
27 September 2012; 19:00	3× (yellow card) 1× (suspension)	Report	3× (yellow card) 1× (suspension)	Campushalle, Flensburg; Attendance: 3,414; Referees: Gubica, Milošević (CRO)

27 September 2012; 20:30	Chekhovskiye Medvedi (Russia)	38 – 31	(Serbia) Partizan	Olimpiysky Sport Palace, Chekhov; Attendance: 1,600; Referees: Leandersson, Lindroos (FIN)
27 September 2012; 20:30	Kovalev 8	(21–16)	Maksić 11	Olimpiysky Sport Palace, Chekhov; Attendance: 1,600; Referees: Leandersson, Lindroos (FIN)
27 September 2012; 20:30	2× (yellow card) 4× (suspension)	Report	2× (yellow card) 4× (suspension)	Olimpiysky Sport Palace, Chekhov; Attendance: 1,600; Referees: Leandersson, Lindroos (FIN)

29 September 2012; 19:00	Ademar León (Spain)	26 – 28	(Germany) HSV Hamburg	Palacio de los Deportes, León; Attendance: 4,200; Referees: Baďura, Ondogrecula (SVK)
29 September 2012; 19:00	Ruesga 11	(14–13)	Lindberg 9	Palacio de los Deportes, León; Attendance: 4,200; Referees: Baďura, Ondogrecula (SVK)
29 September 2012; 19:00	2× (yellow card) 2× (suspension)	Report	3× (yellow card) 3× (suspension)	Palacio de los Deportes, León; Attendance: 4,200; Referees: Baďura, Ondogrecula (SVK)

4 October 2012; 20:00	HSV Hamburg (Germany)	27 – 27	(Russia) Chekhovskiye Medvedi	Alsterdorfer Sporthalle, Hamburg; Attendance: 2,203; Referees: Abrahamsen, Kristiansen (NOR)
4 October 2012; 20:00	Lindberg 10	(15–12)	Kovalev 10	Alsterdorfer Sporthalle, Hamburg; Attendance: 2,203; Referees: Abrahamsen, Kristiansen (NOR)
4 October 2012; 20:00	3× (yellow card) 4× (suspension)	Report	2× (yellow card) 5× (suspension)	Alsterdorfer Sporthalle, Hamburg; Attendance: 2,203; Referees: Abrahamsen, Kristiansen (NOR)

7 October 2012; 19:00	Montpellier (France)	27 – 29	(Spain) Ademar León	Arena Montpellier, Montpellier; Attendance: 8,000; Referees: Stark, Stefan (ROU)
7 October 2012; 19:00	Grebille, Malmagro 6	(13–15)	Ruesga 7	Arena Montpellier, Montpellier; Attendance: 8,000; Referees: Stark, Stefan (ROU)
7 October 2012; 19:00	3× (yellow card) 3× (suspension)	Report	2× (yellow card) 1× (suspension)	Arena Montpellier, Montpellier; Attendance: 8,000; Referees: Stark, Stefan (ROU)

7 October 2012; 19:00	Partizan (Serbia)	31 – 37	(Germany) Flensburg	Čair Sports Center, Niš; Attendance: 5,300; Referees: Horváth, Marton (HUN)
7 October 2012; 19:00	Radivojević 8	(15–17)	Eggert Jensen 13	Čair Sports Center, Niš; Attendance: 5,300; Referees: Horváth, Marton (HUN)
7 October 2012; 19:00	3× (yellow card) 4× (suspension)	Report	3× (yellow card) 3× (suspension)	Čair Sports Center, Niš; Attendance: 5,300; Referees: Horváth, Marton (HUN)

13 October 2012; 18:00	Partizan (Serbia)	33 – 31	(Spain) Ademar León	Čair Sports Center, Niš; Attendance: 3,500; Referees: Hakansson, Nilsson (SWE)
13 October 2012; 18:00	Ilić 8	(17–15)	Campos 11	Čair Sports Center, Niš; Attendance: 3,500; Referees: Hakansson, Nilsson (SWE)
13 October 2012; 18:00	3× (yellow card) 3× (suspension)	Report	3× (yellow card) 2× (suspension)	Čair Sports Center, Niš; Attendance: 3,500; Referees: Hakansson, Nilsson (SWE)

14 October 2012; 17:30	Flensburg (Germany)	36 – 26	(Russia) Chekhovskiye Medvedi	Campushalle, Flensburg; Attendance: 3,425; Referees: Poulsen, Mortensen (DEN)
14 October 2012; 17:30	Glandorf, Svan Hansen 9	(19–14)	three players 5	Campushalle, Flensburg; Attendance: 3,425; Referees: Poulsen, Mortensen (DEN)
14 October 2012; 17:30	3× (yellow card) 6× (suspension)	Report	3× (yellow card) 4× (suspension)	Campushalle, Flensburg; Attendance: 3,425; Referees: Poulsen, Mortensen (DEN)

14 October 2012; 19:00	Montpellier (France)	29 – 33	(Germany) HSV Hamburg	Arena Montpellier, Montpellier; Attendance: 8,000; Referees: Krstić, Ljubić (SLO)
14 October 2012; 19:00	Grebille 11	(14–16)	Lindberg 10	Arena Montpellier, Montpellier; Attendance: 8,000; Referees: Krstić, Ljubić (SLO)
14 October 2012; 19:00	3× (yellow card) 3× (suspension)	Report	3× (yellow card) 2× (suspension)	Arena Montpellier, Montpellier; Attendance: 8,000; Referees: Krstić, Ljubić (SLO)

18 October 2012; 20:30	Chekhovskiye Medvedi (Russia)	35 – 29	(France) Montpellier	Olimpiysky Sport Palace, Chekhov; Attendance: 1,500; Referees: Nikolov, Nachevski (MKD)
18 October 2012; 20:30	Shelmenko, Shishkarev 6	(19–15)	Accambray 10	Olimpiysky Sport Palace, Chekhov; Attendance: 1,500; Referees: Nikolov, Nachevski (MKD)
18 October 2012; 20:30	3× (yellow card) 3× (suspension)	Report	3× (yellow card) 1× (suspension)	Olimpiysky Sport Palace, Chekhov; Attendance: 1,500; Referees: Nikolov, Nachevski (MKD)

21 October 2012; 16:00	HSV Hamburg (Germany)	30 – 24	(Serbia) Partizan	Alsterdorfer Sporthalle, Hamburg; Attendance: 2,400; Referees: Eliasson, Gudjonsson (ISL)
21 October 2012; 16:00	Kraus 8	(17–13)	Ivošević, Maksić 5	Alsterdorfer Sporthalle, Hamburg; Attendance: 2,400; Referees: Eliasson, Gudjonsson (ISL)
21 October 2012; 16:00	3× (yellow card) 3× (suspension)	Report	3× (yellow card) 3× (suspension)	Alsterdorfer Sporthalle, Hamburg; Attendance: 2,400; Referees: Eliasson, Gudjonsson (ISL)

21 October 2012; 17:30	Ademar León (Spain)	29 – 29	(Germany) Flensburg	Palacio de los Deportes, León; Attendance: 4,700; Referees: Herczeg, Südi (HUN)
21 October 2012; 17:30	Ruesga 7	(15–16)	Eggert Jensen 6	Palacio de los Deportes, León; Attendance: 4,700; Referees: Herczeg, Südi (HUN)
21 October 2012; 17:30	2× (yellow card) 5× (suspension)	Report	3× (yellow card) 8× (suspension) 1× (red card)	Palacio de los Deportes, León; Attendance: 4,700; Referees: Herczeg, Südi (HUN)

17 November 2012; 18:00	Ademar León (Spain)	22 – 29	(Russia) Chekhovskiye Medvedi	Palacio de los Deportes, León; Attendance: 4,800; Referees: Krstić, Ljubić (SLO)
17 November 2012; 18:00	Gonz Leoz 5	(10–12)	Gorbok 7	Palacio de los Deportes, León; Attendance: 4,800; Referees: Krstić, Ljubić (SLO)
17 November 2012; 18:00	3× (yellow card) 2× (suspension)	Report	3× (yellow card) 6× (suspension)	Palacio de los Deportes, León; Attendance: 4,800; Referees: Krstić, Ljubić (SLO)

18 November 2012; 17:00	Partizan (Serbia)	29 – 32	(France) Montpellier	Čair Sports Center, Niš; Attendance: 3,500; Referees: Horáček, Novotný (CZE)
18 November 2012; 17:00	Ilić, Radivojević 7	(17–17)	Gajić 12	Čair Sports Center, Niš; Attendance: 3,500; Referees: Horáček, Novotný (CZE)
18 November 2012; 17:00	3× (yellow card) 2× (suspension)	Report	2× (yellow card) 3× (suspension)	Čair Sports Center, Niš; Attendance: 3,500; Referees: Horáček, Novotný (CZE)

18 November 2012; 17:30	HSV Hamburg (Germany)	31 – 28	(Germany) Flensburg	O² World, Hamburg; Attendance: 5,873; Referees: Gubica, Milošević (CRO)
18 November 2012; 17:30	Duvnjak 9	(13–15)	Glandorf 7	O² World, Hamburg; Attendance: 5,873; Referees: Gubica, Milošević (CRO)
18 November 2012; 17:30	3× (yellow card) 3× (suspension)	Report	3× (yellow card) 5× (suspension)	O² World, Hamburg; Attendance: 5,873; Referees: Gubica, Milošević (CRO)

22 November 2012; 20:30	Chekhovskiye Medvedi (Russia)	36 – 22	(Spain) Ademar León	Olimpiysky Sport Palace, Chekhov; Attendance: 3,000; Referees: Hansen, Pettersen (NOR)
22 November 2012; 20:30	Dibirov 6	(18–8)	Carrillo 6	Olimpiysky Sport Palace, Chekhov; Attendance: 3,000; Referees: Hansen, Pettersen (NOR)
22 November 2012; 20:30	3× (yellow card) 8× (suspension)	Report	1× (yellow card) 3× (suspension)	Olimpiysky Sport Palace, Chekhov; Attendance: 3,000; Referees: Hansen, Pettersen (NOR)

25 November 2012; 17:15	Flensburg (Germany)	29 – 26	(Germany) HSV Hamburg	Campushalle, Flensburg; Attendance: 5,466; Referees: Hakansson, Nilsson (SWE)
25 November 2012; 17:15	Glandorf 7	(14–12)	Duvnjak 7	Campushalle, Flensburg; Attendance: 5,466; Referees: Hakansson, Nilsson (SWE)
25 November 2012; 17:15	3× (yellow card) 2× (suspension)	Report	3× (yellow card) 4× (suspension)	Campushalle, Flensburg; Attendance: 5,466; Referees: Hakansson, Nilsson (SWE)

25 November 2012; 19:00	Montpellier (France)	31 – 26	(Serbia) Partizan	Arena Montpellier, Montpellier; Attendance: 3,000; Referees: Kurtagic, Wetterwik (SWE)
25 November 2012; 19:00	Gajić, Guigou 6	(16–10)	Radivojević 6	Arena Montpellier, Montpellier; Attendance: 3,000; Referees: Kurtagic, Wetterwik (SWE)
25 November 2012; 19:00	3× (yellow card) 1× (suspension)	Report	3× (yellow card) 4× (suspension)	Arena Montpellier, Montpellier; Attendance: 3,000; Referees: Kurtagic, Wetterwik (SWE)

29 November 2012; 20:00	Partizan (Serbia)	27 – 31	(Russia) Chekhovskiye Medvedi	Čair Sports Center, Niš; Attendance: 3,000; Referees: Stenrand, Birch (DEN)
29 November 2012; 20:00	Mitrović 6	(14–11)	Dibirov 7	Čair Sports Center, Niš; Attendance: 3,000; Referees: Stenrand, Birch (DEN)
29 November 2012; 20:00	2× (yellow card) 6× (suspension)	Report	3× (yellow card) 5× (suspension) 1× (red card)	Čair Sports Center, Niš; Attendance: 3,000; Referees: Stenrand, Birch (DEN)

29 November 2012; 20:00	HSV Hamburg (Germany)	32 – 26	(Spain) Ademar León	Alsterdorfer Sporthalle, Hamburg; Attendance: 2,400; Referees: Dobrovits, Tájok (HUN)
29 November 2012; 20:00	Lijewski 7	(16–14)	Gonz Leoz 12	Alsterdorfer Sporthalle, Hamburg; Attendance: 2,400; Referees: Dobrovits, Tájok (HUN)
29 November 2012; 20:00	2× (yellow card) 5× (suspension) 1× (red card)	Report	2× (yellow card) 2× (suspension) 1× (red card)	Alsterdorfer Sporthalle, Hamburg; Attendance: 2,400; Referees: Dobrovits, Tájok (HUN)

2 December 2012; 19:00	Montpellier (France)	25 – 27	(Germany) Flensburg	Arena Montpellier, Montpellier; Attendance: 8,000; Referees: Eliasson, Gudjonsson (ISL)
2 December 2012; 19:00	Gajić 12	(14–12)	Mogensen 6	Arena Montpellier, Montpellier; Attendance: 8,000; Referees: Eliasson, Gudjonsson (ISL)
2 December 2012; 19:00	3× (yellow card) 2× (suspension)	Report	3× (yellow card) 2× (suspension)	Arena Montpellier, Montpellier; Attendance: 8,000; Referees: Eliasson, Gudjonsson (ISL)

7 February 2013; 18:45	Chekhovskiye Medvedi (Russia)	29 – 29	(Germany) HSV Hamburg	Olimpiysky Sport Palace, Chekhov; Attendance: 2,000; Referees: Horváth, Márton (HUN)
7 February 2013; 18:45	Dibirov 7	(17–13)	Hens 6	Olimpiysky Sport Palace, Chekhov; Attendance: 2,000; Referees: Horváth, Márton (HUN)
7 February 2013; 18:45	3× (yellow card) 3× (suspension)	Report	3× (yellow card) 2× (suspension)	Olimpiysky Sport Palace, Chekhov; Attendance: 2,000; Referees: Horváth, Márton (HUN)

7 February 2013; 19:30	Flensburg (Germany)	31 – 23	(Serbia) Partizan	Campushalle, Flensburg; Attendance: 3,400; Referees: Cohen, Peretz (ISR)
7 February 2013; 19:30	Eggert 7	(17–13)	Radivojević 5	Campushalle, Flensburg; Attendance: 3,400; Referees: Cohen, Peretz (ISR)
7 February 2013; 19:30	3× (yellow card) 2× (suspension)	Report		Campushalle, Flensburg; Attendance: 3,400; Referees: Cohen, Peretz (ISR)

10 February 2013; 19:00	Ademar León (Spain)	30 – 28	(France) Montpellier	Palacio de los Deportes, León; Attendance: 5,000; Referees: Leifsson, Pálsson (ISL)
10 February 2013; 19:00	Goni Leoz 9	(11–13)	Accambray 9	Palacio de los Deportes, León; Attendance: 5,000; Referees: Leifsson, Pálsson (ISL)
10 February 2013; 19:00	2× (yellow card) 3× (suspension)	Report	3× (yellow card) 2× (suspension)	Palacio de los Deportes, León; Attendance: 5,000; Referees: Leifsson, Pálsson (ISL)

13 February 2013; 20:30	Flensburg (Germany)	27 – 22	(Spain) Ademar León	Campushalle, Flensburg; Attendance: 3,524; Referees: Stoļarovs, Līcis (LAT)
13 February 2013; 20:30	Glandorf, Kaufmann 7	(14–10)	Campos 5	Campushalle, Flensburg; Attendance: 3,524; Referees: Stoļarovs, Līcis (LAT)
13 February 2013; 20:30	2× (yellow card)	Report	3× (yellow card) 2× (suspension)	Campushalle, Flensburg; Attendance: 3,524; Referees: Stoļarovs, Līcis (LAT)

16 February 2013; 19:00	Partizan (Serbia)	21 – 42	(Germany) HSV Hamburg	Čair Sports Center, Niš; Attendance: 4,200; Referees: Mazeika, Gatelis (LTU)
16 February 2013; 19:00	three players 4	(10–24)	Lindberg 10	Čair Sports Center, Niš; Attendance: 4,200; Referees: Mazeika, Gatelis (LTU)
16 February 2013; 19:00	3× (yellow card) 4× (suspension)	Report	3× (yellow card) 1× (suspension)	Čair Sports Center, Niš; Attendance: 4,200; Referees: Mazeika, Gatelis (LTU)

17 February 2013; 19:00	Montpellier (France)	30 – 30	(Russia) Chekhovskiye Medvedi	Arena Montpellier, Montpellier; Attendance: 7,000; Referees: Gubica, Milošević (CRO)
17 February 2013; 19:00	Accambray, Gajić 6	(17–17)	Dibirov 7	Arena Montpellier, Montpellier; Attendance: 7,000; Referees: Gubica, Milošević (CRO)
17 February 2013; 19:00	3× (yellow card) 3× (suspension)	Report	3× (yellow card) 3× (suspension)	Arena Montpellier, Montpellier; Attendance: 7,000; Referees: Gubica, Milošević (CRO)

21 February 2013; 20:15	Chekhovskiye Medvedi (Russia)	29 – 29	(Germany) Flensburg	Olimpiysky Sport Palace, Chekhov; Attendance: 2,500; Referees: Kleven, Ramberg (NOR)
21 February 2013; 20:15	Dibirov 8	(14–13)	Kaufmann 7	Olimpiysky Sport Palace, Chekhov; Attendance: 2,500; Referees: Kleven, Ramberg (NOR)
21 February 2013; 20:15	3× (yellow card) 4× (suspension)	Report	3× (yellow card) 3× (suspension)	Olimpiysky Sport Palace, Chekhov; Attendance: 2,500; Referees: Kleven, Ramberg (NOR)

23 February 2013; 18:00	Ademar León (Spain)	28 – 23	(Serbia) Partizan	Palacio de los Deportes, León; Attendance: 5,000; Referees: Olesen, Pedersen (DEN)
23 February 2013; 18:00	Ruesga 10	(14–10)	Radovanović 5	Palacio de los Deportes, León; Attendance: 5,000; Referees: Olesen, Pedersen (DEN)
23 February 2013; 18:00	3× (yellow card) 4× (suspension)	Report	3× (yellow card) 7× (suspension)	Palacio de los Deportes, León; Attendance: 5,000; Referees: Olesen, Pedersen (DEN)

23 February 2013; 19:00	HSV Hamburg (Germany)	35 – 33	(France) Montpellier	O² World, Hamburg; Attendance: 6,752; Referees: Kurtagic, Wetterwik (SWE)
23 February 2013; 19:00	Lindberg 8	(18–15)	Accambray 8	O² World, Hamburg; Attendance: 6,752; Referees: Kurtagic, Wetterwik (SWE)
23 February 2013; 19:00	3× (yellow card) 3× (suspension)	Report	2× (yellow card) 2× (suspension) 1× (red card)	O² World, Hamburg; Attendance: 6,752; Referees: Kurtagic, Wetterwik (SWE)

=== Group B ===
Team	Pld	W	D	L	GF	GA	GD	Pts
(Hungary) MKB Veszprém	10	9	0	1	295	242	+53	18
(Germany) THW Kiel	10	8	0	2	329	265	+64	16
(Spain) Atlético Madrid	10	5	0	5	268	269	−1	10
(Slovenia) Celje	10	4	0	6	245	258	−13	8
(Romania) HCM Constanța	10	2	0	8	234	283	−49	4
(Sweden) IK Sävehof	10	2	0	8	276	330	−54	4

27 September 2012; 19:00	IK Sävehof (Sweden)	35 – 31	(Romania) HCM Constanța	Scandinavium, Gothenburg; Attendance: 2,428; Referees: Baranowski, Lemanowicz (POL)
27 September 2012; 19:00	Larsson 9	(19–17)	four players 5	Scandinavium, Gothenburg; Attendance: 2,428; Referees: Baranowski, Lemanowicz (POL)
27 September 2012; 19:00	3× (yellow card) 6× (suspension)	Report	3× (yellow card) 2× (suspension)	Scandinavium, Gothenburg; Attendance: 2,428; Referees: Baranowski, Lemanowicz (POL)

29 September 2012; 17:00	MKB Veszprém (Hungary)	32 – 22	(Slovenia) Celje Pivovarna Laško	Veszprém Aréna, Veszprém; Attendance: 5,019; Referees: Mazeika, Gatelis (LTU)
29 September 2012; 17:00	Rodriguez 5	(16–11)	Mackovsek, Marguč 4	Veszprém Aréna, Veszprém; Attendance: 5,019; Referees: Mazeika, Gatelis (LTU)
29 September 2012; 17:00	3× (yellow card) 4× (suspension)	Report	3× (yellow card) 7× (suspension)	Veszprém Aréna, Veszprém; Attendance: 5,019; Referees: Mazeika, Gatelis (LTU)

30 September 2012; 18:00	Atlético Madrid (Spain)	27 – 32	(Germany) THW Kiel	Palacio Vistalegre, Madrid; Attendance: 8,853; Referees: Gjeding, Hansen (DEN)
30 September 2012; 18:00	Lazarov 6	(15–17)	Jícha 7	Palacio Vistalegre, Madrid; Attendance: 8,853; Referees: Gjeding, Hansen (DEN)
30 September 2012; 18:00	3× (yellow card) 2× (suspension)	Report	3× (yellow card) 8× (suspension) 1× (red card)	Palacio Vistalegre, Madrid; Attendance: 8,853; Referees: Gjeding, Hansen (DEN)

3 October 2012; 20:00	HCM Constanța (Romania)	27 – 37	(Hungary) MKB Veszprém	Polyvalent Hall, Bucharest; Attendance: 3,000; Referees: Pandžić, Mosorinski (SRB)
3 October 2012; 20:00	Čutura, Şimicu 7	(12–19)	Császár 8	Polyvalent Hall, Bucharest; Attendance: 3,000; Referees: Pandžić, Mosorinski (SRB)
3 October 2012; 20:00	3× (yellow card) 5× (suspension) 1× (red card)	Report	3× (yellow card) 3× (suspension)	Polyvalent Hall, Bucharest; Attendance: 3,000; Referees: Pandžić, Mosorinski (SRB)

6 October 2012; 16:30	Celje Pivovarna Laško (Slovenia)	22 – 28	(Spain) Atlético Madrid	Zlatorog Arena, Celje; Attendance: 1,300; Referees: Pichon, Reveret (FRA)
6 October 2012; 16:30	Marguč 8	(15–13)	Lazarov 8	Zlatorog Arena, Celje; Attendance: 1,300; Referees: Pichon, Reveret (FRA)
6 October 2012; 16:30	3× (yellow card) 1× (suspension)	Report	3× (yellow card) 3× (suspension)	Zlatorog Arena, Celje; Attendance: 1,300; Referees: Pichon, Reveret (FRA)

7 October 2012; 16:45	THW Kiel (Germany)	43 – 34	(Sweden) IK Sävehof	Sparkassen-Arena, Kiel; Attendance: 9,800; Referees: Togstad, Kristiansen (NOR)
7 October 2012; 16:45	Vujin 9	(25–15)	Bliznac 8	Sparkassen-Arena, Kiel; Attendance: 9,800; Referees: Togstad, Kristiansen (NOR)
7 October 2012; 16:45	3× (yellow card) 3× (suspension)	Report	3× (yellow card) 3× (suspension)	Sparkassen-Arena, Kiel; Attendance: 9,800; Referees: Togstad, Kristiansen (NOR)

11 October 2012; 20:00	THW Kiel (Germany)	35 – 14	(Romania) HCM Constanța	Sparkassen-Arena, Kiel; Attendance: 9,400; Referees: Bounouara, Sami (FRA)
11 October 2012; 20:00	Ilić, Narcisse 5	(16–7)	Angelovski 4	Sparkassen-Arena, Kiel; Attendance: 9,400; Referees: Bounouara, Sami (FRA)
11 October 2012; 20:00	3× (yellow card) 6× (suspension)	Report	3× (yellow card) 5× (suspension)	Sparkassen-Arena, Kiel; Attendance: 9,400; Referees: Bounouara, Sami (FRA)

13 October 2012; 20:00	Celje Pivovarna Laško (Slovenia)	31 – 25	(Sweden) IK Sävehof	Zlatorog Arena, Celje; Attendance: 2,280; Referees: Zotin, Volodkov (RUS)
13 October 2012; 20:00	Marguč 9	(17–14)	Nielsen 5	Zlatorog Arena, Celje; Attendance: 2,280; Referees: Zotin, Volodkov (RUS)
13 October 2012; 20:00	3× (yellow card) 2× (suspension) 1× (red card)	Report	3× (yellow card) 2× (suspension)	Zlatorog Arena, Celje; Attendance: 2,280; Referees: Zotin, Volodkov (RUS)

14 October 2012; 18:00	Atlético Madrid (Spain)	26 – 27	(Hungary) MKB Veszprém	Palacio Vistalegre, Madrid; Attendance: 4,831; Referees: Gubica, Milošević (CRO)
14 October 2012; 18:00	Aguinagalde, Barachet 4	(13–15)	Nagy 10	Palacio Vistalegre, Madrid; Attendance: 4,831; Referees: Gubica, Milošević (CRO)
14 October 2012; 18:00	3× (yellow card) 2× (suspension)	Report	3× (yellow card) 3× (suspension)	Palacio Vistalegre, Madrid; Attendance: 4,831; Referees: Gubica, Milošević (CRO)

17 October 2012; 19:00	IK Sävehof (Sweden)	35 – 30	(Spain) Atlético Madrid	Scandinavium, Gothenburg; Attendance: 3,128; Referees: Nikolić, Stojković (SRB)
17 October 2012; 19:00	Bliznac 7	(17–16)	Lazarov 6	Scandinavium, Gothenburg; Attendance: 3,128; Referees: Nikolić, Stojković (SRB)
17 October 2012; 19:00	3× (yellow card) 6× (suspension)	Report	2× (yellow card) 2× (suspension)	Scandinavium, Gothenburg; Attendance: 3,128; Referees: Nikolić, Stojković (SRB)

18 October 2012; 19:00	MKB Veszprém (Hungary)	31 – 30	(Germany) THW Kiel	Veszprém Aréna, Veszprém; Attendance: 5,019; Referees: Abrahamsen, Kristiansen (NOR)
18 October 2012; 19:00	Nagy 9	(14–15)	Sigurðsson 8	Veszprém Aréna, Veszprém; Attendance: 5,019; Referees: Abrahamsen, Kristiansen (NOR)
18 October 2012; 19:00	3× (yellow card) 4× (suspension)	Report	3× (yellow card) 6× (suspension)	Veszprém Aréna, Veszprém; Attendance: 5,019; Referees: Abrahamsen, Kristiansen (NOR)

18 October 2012; 20:00	HCM Constanța (Romania)	22 – 17	(Slovenia) Celje Pivovarna Laško	Romeo Iamandi Sports Hall, Buzău; Attendance: 1,300; Referees: Horáček, Novotný (CZE)
18 October 2012; 20:00	Čutura 4	(10–5)	four players 3	Romeo Iamandi Sports Hall, Buzău; Attendance: 1,300; Referees: Horáček, Novotný (CZE)
18 October 2012; 20:00	3× (yellow card) 5× (suspension)	Report	3× (yellow card) 3× (suspension)	Romeo Iamandi Sports Hall, Buzău; Attendance: 1,300; Referees: Horáček, Novotný (CZE)

15 November 2012; 18:30	HCM Constanța (Romania)	23 – 28	(Spain) Atlético Madrid	Polyvalent Hall, Bucharest; Attendance: 3,000; Referees: Erdoğan, Özdeniz (TUR)
15 November 2012; 18:30	Humet 5	(13–12)	Lazarov, Markussen 8	Polyvalent Hall, Bucharest; Attendance: 3,000; Referees: Erdoğan, Özdeniz (TUR)
15 November 2012; 18:30	3× (yellow card) 3× (suspension)	Report	2× (yellow card) 3× (suspension)	Polyvalent Hall, Bucharest; Attendance: 3,000; Referees: Erdoğan, Özdeniz (TUR)

17 November 2012; 16:30	Celje Pivovarna Laško (Slovenia)	31 – 28	(Germany) THW Kiel	Zlatorog Arena, Celje; Attendance: 4,500; Referees: Stolarovs, Licis (LAT)
17 November 2012; 16:30	Marguč 7	(12–12)	Sigurðsson 7	Zlatorog Arena, Celje; Attendance: 4,500; Referees: Stolarovs, Licis (LAT)
17 November 2012; 16:30	3× (yellow card) 5× (suspension)	Report	3× (yellow card) 1× (suspension)	Zlatorog Arena, Celje; Attendance: 4,500; Referees: Stolarovs, Licis (LAT)

18 November 2012; 16:30	IK Sävehof (Sweden)	22 – 32	(Hungary) MKB Veszprém	Scandinavium, Gothenburg; Attendance: 3,273; Referees: Dentz, Reibel (FRA)
18 November 2012; 16:30	Tönnesen 5	(10–14)	Császár 8	Scandinavium, Gothenburg; Attendance: 3,273; Referees: Dentz, Reibel (FRA)
18 November 2012; 16:30	3× (yellow card) 2× (suspension)	Report	3× (yellow card) 4× (suspension)	Scandinavium, Gothenburg; Attendance: 3,273; Referees: Dentz, Reibel (FRA)

21 November 2012; 19:00	THW Kiel (Germany)	30 – 26	(Slovenia) Celje Pivovarna Laško	Sparkassen-Arena, Kiel; Attendance: 8,250; Referees: Opava, Válek (CZE)
21 November 2012; 19:00	Ekberg 9	(13–12)	Marguč 11	Sparkassen-Arena, Kiel; Attendance: 8,250; Referees: Opava, Válek (CZE)
21 November 2012; 19:00	1× (yellow card) 3× (suspension)	Report	2× (yellow card) 7× (suspension)	Sparkassen-Arena, Kiel; Attendance: 8,250; Referees: Opava, Válek (CZE)

24 November 2012; 19:00	MKB Veszprém (Hungary)	34 – 24	(Sweden) IK Sävehof	Veszprém Aréna, Veszprém; Attendance: 5,019; Referees: Zotin, Volodkov (RUS)
24 November 2012; 19:00	Császár, Sulić 5	(17–15)	Bliznac 6	Veszprém Aréna, Veszprém; Attendance: 5,019; Referees: Zotin, Volodkov (RUS)
24 November 2012; 19:00	2× (yellow card) 1× (suspension)	Report	3× (yellow card) 1× (suspension)	Veszprém Aréna, Veszprém; Attendance: 5,019; Referees: Zotin, Volodkov (RUS)

25 November 2012; 17:00	Atlético Madrid (Spain)	25 – 24	(Romania) HCM Constanța	Palacio Vistalegre, Madrid; Attendance: 4,027; Referees: Leszczynski, Piechota (POL)
25 November 2012; 17:00	Lazarov, Parrondo 4	(12–11)	Toma 6	Palacio Vistalegre, Madrid; Attendance: 4,027; Referees: Leszczynski, Piechota (POL)
25 November 2012; 17:00	3× (yellow card) 6× (suspension)	Report	3× (yellow card) 8× (suspension)	Palacio Vistalegre, Madrid; Attendance: 4,027; Referees: Leszczynski, Piechota (POL)

29 November 2012; 20:00	HCM Constanța (Romania)	28 – 23	(Sweden) IK Sävehof	Romeo Iamandi Sports Hall, Buzău; Attendance: 1,400; Referees: Nikolov, Nachevski (MKD)
29 November 2012; 20:00	Toma 7	(18–9)	Fridén 5	Romeo Iamandi Sports Hall, Buzău; Attendance: 1,400; Referees: Nikolov, Nachevski (MKD)
29 November 2012; 20:00	3× (yellow card) 1× (suspension)	Report	3× (yellow card) 2× (suspension)	Romeo Iamandi Sports Hall, Buzău; Attendance: 1,400; Referees: Nikolov, Nachevski (MKD)

1 December 2012; 19:00	Celje Pivovarna Laško (Slovenia)	19 – 24	(Hungary) MKB Veszprém	Zlatorog Arena, Celje; Attendance: 5,827; Referees: Poulsen, Mortensen (DEN)
1 December 2012; 19:00	Marguč 5	(9–11)	Császár, Nagy 4	Zlatorog Arena, Celje; Attendance: 5,827; Referees: Poulsen, Mortensen (DEN)
1 December 2012; 19:00	3× (yellow card) 3× (suspension)	Report	2× (yellow card) 6× (suspension) 1× (red card)	Zlatorog Arena, Celje; Attendance: 5,827; Referees: Poulsen, Mortensen (DEN)

2 December 2012; 17:15	THW Kiel (Germany)	31 – 27	(Spain) Atlético Madrid	Sparkassen-Arena, Kiel; Attendance: 10,000; Referees: Caçador, Nicolau (POR)
2 December 2012; 17:15	Jícha 13	(15–15)	Markussen 8	Sparkassen-Arena, Kiel; Attendance: 10,000; Referees: Caçador, Nicolau (POR)
2 December 2012; 17:15	2× (yellow card) 2× (suspension)	Report	3× (yellow card) 4× (suspension)	Sparkassen-Arena, Kiel; Attendance: 10,000; Referees: Caçador, Nicolau (POR)

9 February 2013; 16:00	IK Sävehof (Sweden)	29 – 40	(Germany) THW Kiel	Frölundaborg, Gothenburg; Attendance: 4,531; Referees: Pichon, Reveret (FRA)
9 February 2013; 16:00	Bliznac 9	(15–20)	Ekberg 9	Frölundaborg, Gothenburg; Attendance: 4,531; Referees: Pichon, Reveret (FRA)
9 February 2013; 16:00	3× (yellow card) 4× (suspension)	Report	2× (yellow card) 5× (suspension)	Frölundaborg, Gothenburg; Attendance: 4,531; Referees: Pichon, Reveret (FRA)

9 February 2013; 17:15	MKB Veszprém (Hungary)	31 – 21	(Romania) HCM Constanța	Veszprém Aréna, Veszprém; Attendance: 5,000; Referees: Opava, Válek (CZE)
9 February 2013; 17:15	Császár 9	(14–11)	Čutura 4	Veszprém Aréna, Veszprém; Attendance: 5,000; Referees: Opava, Válek (CZE)
9 February 2013; 17:15	3× (yellow card) 3× (suspension)	Report	3× (yellow card) 3× (suspension) 1× (red card)	Veszprém Aréna, Veszprém; Attendance: 5,000; Referees: Opava, Válek (CZE)

10 February 2013; 18:00	Atlético Madrid (Spain)	26 – 24	(Slovenia) Celje Pivovarna Laško	Palacio Vistalegre, Madrid; Attendance: 4,676; Referees: Olesen, Pedersen (DEN)
10 February 2013; 18:00	three players 5	(12–9)	Mačkovšek 9	Palacio Vistalegre, Madrid; Attendance: 4,676; Referees: Olesen, Pedersen (DEN)
10 February 2013; 18:00	3× (yellow card) 5× (suspension)	Report	2× (yellow card) 5× (suspension)	Palacio Vistalegre, Madrid; Attendance: 4,676; Referees: Olesen, Pedersen (DEN)

16 February 2013; 16:30	Celje Pivovarna Laško (Slovenia)	24 – 19	(Romania) HCM Constanța	Zlatorog Arena, Celje; Attendance: 4,000; Referees: Gousko, Repkin (BLR)
16 February 2013; 16:30	Mackovsek 6	(11–6)	Čutura, Sadoveac 5	Zlatorog Arena, Celje; Attendance: 4,000; Referees: Gousko, Repkin (BLR)
16 February 2013; 16:30	3× (yellow card) 1× (suspension)	Report	3× (yellow card) 3× (suspension)	Zlatorog Arena, Celje; Attendance: 4,000; Referees: Gousko, Repkin (BLR)

17 February 2013; 17:00	Atlético Madrid (Spain)	32 – 25	(Sweden) IK Sävehof	Palacio Vistalegre, Madrid; Attendance: 4,923; Referees: Eliasson, Gudjonsson (ISR)
17 February 2013; 17:00	Lazarov, Parrondo 5	(14–11)	Bliznac 7	Palacio Vistalegre, Madrid; Attendance: 4,923; Referees: Eliasson, Gudjonsson (ISR)
17 February 2013; 17:00	3× (yellow card) 1× (suspension)	Report	3× (yellow card) 3× (suspension)	Palacio Vistalegre, Madrid; Attendance: 4,923; Referees: Eliasson, Gudjonsson (ISR)

17 February 2013; 19:00	THW Kiel (Germany)	32 – 21	(Hungary) MKB Veszprém	Sparkassen-Arena, Kiel; Attendance: 10,200; Referees: Dentz, Reibel (FRA)
17 February 2013; 19:00	Sigurðsson 7	(17–13)	Nagy 5	Sparkassen-Arena, Kiel; Attendance: 10,200; Referees: Dentz, Reibel (FRA)
17 February 2013; 19:00	3× (yellow card) 1× (suspension)	Report	3× (yellow card) 2× (suspension)	Sparkassen-Arena, Kiel; Attendance: 10,200; Referees: Dentz, Reibel (FRA)

20 February 2013; 20:00	HCM Constanța (Romania)	25 – 28	(Germany) THW Kiel	Polyvalent Hall, Bucharest; Attendance: 2,500; Referees: Kaveshnikov, Plotnikov (RUS)
20 February 2013; 20:00	Toma 6	(11–16)	Jícha 7	Polyvalent Hall, Bucharest; Attendance: 2,500; Referees: Kaveshnikov, Plotnikov (RUS)
20 February 2013; 20:00	3× (yellow card) 6× (suspension) 1× (red card)	Report	3× (yellow card) 3× (suspension)	Polyvalent Hall, Bucharest; Attendance: 2,500; Referees: Kaveshnikov, Plotnikov (RUS)

21 February 2013; 19:00	IK Sävehof (Sweden)	24 – 29	(Slovenia) Celje Pivovarna Laško	Frölundaborg, Gothenburg; Attendance: 2,450; Referees: Horáček, Novotný (CZE)
21 February 2013; 19:00	Ottosson 6	(10–14)	Marguč 9	Frölundaborg, Gothenburg; Attendance: 2,450; Referees: Horáček, Novotný (CZE)
21 February 2013; 19:00	3× (yellow card) 2× (suspension) 1× (red card)	Report	3× (yellow card) 4× (suspension)	Frölundaborg, Gothenburg; Attendance: 2,450; Referees: Horáček, Novotný (CZE)

23 February 2013; 17:15	MKB Veszprém (Hungary)	26 – 19	(Spain) Atlético Madrid	Veszprém Aréna, Veszprém; Attendance: 5,008; Referees: Jurinović, Mrvica (CRO)
23 February 2013; 17:15	Ugalde 6	(12–8)	Masachs Gelma 4	Veszprém Aréna, Veszprém; Attendance: 5,008; Referees: Jurinović, Mrvica (CRO)
23 February 2013; 17:15	3× (yellow card) 2× (suspension)	Report	3× (yellow card) 3× (suspension)	Veszprém Aréna, Veszprém; Attendance: 5,008; Referees: Jurinović, Mrvica (CRO)

=== Group C ===
Team	Pld	W	D	L	GF	GA	GD	Pts
(Poland) Vive Targi Kielce	10	10	0	0	305	249	+56	20
(North Macedonia) Metalurg Skopje	10	7	0	3	271	215	+56	14
(Slovenia) Gorenje	10	6	0	4	281	250	+31	12
(Denmark) Bjerringbro-Silkeborg^{1}	10	4	0	6	259	281	−22	8
(France) Chambéry	10	2	0	8	266	294	−28	4
(Russia) St. Petersburg	10	1	0	9	225	318	−93	2

29 September 2012; 20:00	Gorenje (Slovenia)	35 – 22	(Russia) St. Petersburg	Red Hall, Velenje; Attendance: 1,100; Referees: Fleisch, Rieber (GER)
29 September 2012; 20:00	Bezjak 9	(16–10)	Pyshkin 4	Red Hall, Velenje; Attendance: 1,100; Referees: Fleisch, Rieber (GER)
29 September 2012; 20:00	2× (yellow card) 1× (suspension)	Report	3× (yellow card) 2× (suspension)	Red Hall, Velenje; Attendance: 1,100; Referees: Fleisch, Rieber (GER)

30 September 2012; 17:00	Vive Targi Kielce (Poland)	35 – 26	(Denmark) Bjerringbro-Silkeborg	Hala Legionów, Kielce; Attendance: 4,200; Referees: Lorente, Serradilla (ESP)
30 September 2012; 17:00	Čupić 9	(17–12)	Jörgensen 8	Hala Legionów, Kielce; Attendance: 4,200; Referees: Lorente, Serradilla (ESP)
30 September 2012; 17:00	3× (yellow card) 1× (suspension)	Report	3× (yellow card) 5× (suspension)	Hala Legionów, Kielce; Attendance: 4,200; Referees: Lorente, Serradilla (ESP)

30 September 2012; 19:00	Chambéry (France)	30 – 33	(North Macedonia) Metalurg Skopje	Le Phare, Chambéry; Attendance: 3,000; Referees: Geipel, Helbig (GER)
30 September 2012; 19:00	Bašić 7	(13–15)	Manaskov, Mojsovski 7	Le Phare, Chambéry; Attendance: 3,000; Referees: Geipel, Helbig (GER)
30 September 2012; 19:00	3× (yellow card) 2× (suspension)	Report	3× (yellow card) 2× (suspension)	Le Phare, Chambéry; Attendance: 3,000; Referees: Geipel, Helbig (GER)

6 October 2012; 18:00	Metalurg Skopje (North Macedonia)	30 – 23	(Slovenia) Gorenje	Boris Trajkovski Sports Center, Skopje; Attendance: 6,000; Referees: Dinu, Din (ROU)
6 October 2012; 18:00	Georgievski, Manaskov 7	(13–6)	Bezjak 8	Boris Trajkovski Sports Center, Skopje; Attendance: 6,000; Referees: Dinu, Din (ROU)
6 October 2012; 18:00	3× (yellow card) 4× (suspension)	Report	3× (yellow card) 4× (suspension)	Boris Trajkovski Sports Center, Skopje; Attendance: 6,000; Referees: Dinu, Din (ROU)

6 October 2012; 19:00	St. Petersburg (Russia)	21 – 31	(Poland) Vive Targi Kielce	Sportkompleks "Ubileyniy", St. Petersburg; Attendance: 120; Referees: Nikolić, Stojković (SRB)
6 October 2012; 19:00	Nasyrov 7	(10–17)	Čupić 12	Sportkompleks "Ubileyniy", St. Petersburg; Attendance: 120; Referees: Nikolić, Stojković (SRB)
6 October 2012; 19:00	3× (yellow card) 3× (suspension)	Report	3× (yellow card) 1× (suspension)	Sportkompleks "Ubileyniy", St. Petersburg; Attendance: 120; Referees: Nikolić, Stojković (SRB)

7 October 2012; 17:00	Bjerringbro-Silkeborg (Denmark)	25 – 23	(France) Chambéry	Silkeborg-Hallerne, Silkeborg; Attendance: 1,813; Referees: Kékes, Kékes (HUN)
7 October 2012; 17:00	Mortensen 8	(14–15)	Nyokas 8	Silkeborg-Hallerne, Silkeborg; Attendance: 1,813; Referees: Kékes, Kékes (HUN)
7 October 2012; 17:00	3× (yellow card) 2× (suspension)	Report	2× (yellow card) 2× (suspension)	Silkeborg-Hallerne, Silkeborg; Attendance: 1,813; Referees: Kékes, Kékes (HUN)

13 October 2012; 17:00	Vive Targi Kielce (Poland)	30 – 24	(Slovenia) Gorenje	Hala Legionów, Kielce; Attendance: 4,200; Referees: Erdoğan, Özdeniz (TUR)
13 October 2012; 17:00	Jurecki 8	(13–12)	Melić 9	Hala Legionów, Kielce; Attendance: 4,200; Referees: Erdoğan, Özdeniz (TUR)
13 October 2012; 17:00	3× (yellow card) 3× (suspension)	Report	3× (yellow card) 2× (suspension)	Hala Legionów, Kielce; Attendance: 4,200; Referees: Erdoğan, Özdeniz (TUR)

13 October 2012; 19:00	St. Petersburg (Russia)	31 – 27	(France) Chambéry	Sportkompleks "Ubileyniy", St. Petersburg; Attendance: 200; Referees: Johansson, Kliko (SWE)
13 October 2012; 19:00	Grigoriev 9	(19–12)	Bašić 10	Sportkompleks "Ubileyniy", St. Petersburg; Attendance: 200; Referees: Johansson, Kliko (SWE)
13 October 2012; 19:00	3× (yellow card) 6× (suspension)	Report	3× (yellow card) 1× (suspension)	Sportkompleks "Ubileyniy", St. Petersburg; Attendance: 200; Referees: Johansson, Kliko (SWE)

14 October 2012; 17:00	Bjerringbro-Silkeborg (Denmark)	23 – 26	(North Macedonia) Metalurg Skopje	Silkeborg-Hallerne, Silkeborg; Attendance: 2,000; Referees: San Jose, Murcia (ESP)
14 October 2012; 17:00	Lauge Schmidt, Nielsen 5	(14–11)	Mojsovski 7	Silkeborg-Hallerne, Silkeborg; Attendance: 2,000; Referees: San Jose, Murcia (ESP)
14 October 2012; 17:00	3× (yellow card) 4× (suspension)	Report	3× (yellow card) 7× (suspension) 1× (red card)	Silkeborg-Hallerne, Silkeborg; Attendance: 2,000; Referees: San Jose, Murcia (ESP)

17 October 2012; 20:00	Gorenje (Slovenia)	31 – 23	(Denmark) Bjerringbro-Silkeborg	Red Hall, Velenje; Attendance: 1,200; Referees: Schulze, Tönnies (GER)
17 October 2012; 20:00	Melić 9	(14–8)	Baagöe 4	Red Hall, Velenje; Attendance: 1,200; Referees: Schulze, Tönnies (GER)
17 October 2012; 20:00	3× (yellow card) 5× (suspension)	Report	2× (yellow card) 3× (suspension)	Red Hall, Velenje; Attendance: 1,200; Referees: Schulze, Tönnies (GER)

20 October 2012; 18:00	Metalurg Skopje (North Macedonia)	32 – 19	(Russia) St. Petersburg	Boris Trajkovski Sports Center, Skopje; Attendance: 6,200; Referees: Dobrovits, Tájok (HUN)
20 October 2012; 18:00	Vugrinec 11	(15–11)	Nasyrov, Semenov 4	Boris Trajkovski Sports Center, Skopje; Attendance: 6,200; Referees: Dobrovits, Tájok (HUN)
20 October 2012; 18:00	3× (yellow card) 3× (suspension)	Report	2× (yellow card) 4× (suspension)	Boris Trajkovski Sports Center, Skopje; Attendance: 6,200; Referees: Dobrovits, Tájok (HUN)

21 October 2012; 19:00	Chambéry (France)	26 – 36	(Poland) Vive Targi Kielce	Le Phare, Chambéry; Attendance: 3,400; Referees: López, Ramírez (ESP)
21 October 2012; 19:00	Detrez 7	(15–18)	Čupić 8	Le Phare, Chambéry; Attendance: 3,400; Referees: López, Ramírez (ESP)
21 October 2012; 19:00	3× (yellow card) 2× (suspension)	Report	2× (yellow card) 3× (suspension)	Le Phare, Chambéry; Attendance: 3,400; Referees: López, Ramírez (ESP)

18 November 2012; 18:00	Metalurg Skopje (North Macedonia)	21 – 23	(Poland) Vive Targi Kielce	Boris Trajkovski Sports Center, Skopje; Attendance: 6,900; Referees: Gousko, Repkin (BLR)
18 November 2012; 18:00	Vugrinec 7	(12–10)	Čupić 8	Boris Trajkovski Sports Center, Skopje; Attendance: 6,900; Referees: Gousko, Repkin (BLR)
18 November 2012; 18:00	3× (yellow card) 2× (suspension)	Report	3× (yellow card) 4× (suspension)	Boris Trajkovski Sports Center, Skopje; Attendance: 6,900; Referees: Gousko, Repkin (BLR)

18 November 2012; 19:00	Chambéry (France)	20 – 31	(Slovenia) Gorenje	Le Phare, Chambéry; Attendance: 3,600; Referees: Baďura, Ondogrecula (SVK)
18 November 2012; 19:00	Marroux 5	(9–16)	Melić 8	Le Phare, Chambéry; Attendance: 3,600; Referees: Baďura, Ondogrecula (SVK)
18 November 2012; 19:00	3× (yellow card) 1× (suspension)	Report	3× (yellow card) 4× (suspension)	Le Phare, Chambéry; Attendance: 3,600; Referees: Baďura, Ondogrecula (SVK)

18 November 2012; 20:00	St. Petersburg (Russia)	23 – 35	(Denmark) Bjerringbro-Silkeborg	Sportkompleks "Ubileyniy", St. Petersburg; Attendance: 400; Referees: Geipel, Helbig (GER)
18 November 2012; 20:00	Pyshkin, Semenov 4	(11–18)	Jörgensen, Mortensen 7	Sportkompleks "Ubileyniy", St. Petersburg; Attendance: 400; Referees: Geipel, Helbig (GER)
18 November 2012; 20:00	3× (yellow card) 2× (suspension)	Report	2× (yellow card) 2× (suspension)	Sportkompleks "Ubileyniy", St. Petersburg; Attendance: 400; Referees: Geipel, Helbig (GER)

24 November 2012; 16:30	Gorenje (Slovenia)	31 – 25	(France) Chambéry	Red Hall, Velenje; Attendance: 1,100; Referees: Dinu, Din (ROU)
24 November 2012; 16:30	Dolenec, Melić 8	(18–13)	Gille 6	Red Hall, Velenje; Attendance: 1,100; Referees: Dinu, Din (ROU)
24 November 2012; 16:30	3× (yellow card) 5× (suspension)	Report	3× (yellow card) 7× (suspension)	Red Hall, Velenje; Attendance: 1,100; Referees: Dinu, Din (ROU)

24 November 2012; 18:00	Vive Targi Kielce (Poland)	21 – 20	(North Macedonia) Metalurg Skopje	Hala Legionów, Kielce; Attendance: 4,000; Referees: Stolarovs, Licis (LAT)
24 November 2012; 18:00	Jurecki 6	(8–12)	Mojsovski 6	Hala Legionów, Kielce; Attendance: 4,000; Referees: Stolarovs, Licis (LAT)
24 November 2012; 18:00	2× (yellow card) 5× (suspension)	Report	2× (yellow card) 2× (suspension)	Hala Legionów, Kielce; Attendance: 4,000; Referees: Stolarovs, Licis (LAT)

25 November 2012; 17:00	Bjerringbro-Silkeborg (Denmark)	31 – 22	(Russia) St. Petersburg	Silkeborg-Hallerne, Silkeborg; Attendance: 1,971; Referees: Wyss, Zowa (SUI)
25 November 2012; 17:00	Jörgensen, Mortensen 8	(17–12)	Nasyrov 9	Silkeborg-Hallerne, Silkeborg; Attendance: 1,971; Referees: Wyss, Zowa (SUI)
25 November 2012; 17:00	2× (yellow card) 1× (suspension)	Report	2× (yellow card) 5× (suspension)	Silkeborg-Hallerne, Silkeborg; Attendance: 1,971; Referees: Wyss, Zowa (SUI)

1 December 2012; 08:00	Metalurg Skopje (North Macedonia)	26 – 21	(France) Chambéry	Boris Trajkovski Sports Center, Skopje; Attendance: 6,963; Referees: Kékes, Kékes (HUN)
1 December 2012; 08:00	Vugrinec 7	(13–12)	Paty 8	Boris Trajkovski Sports Center, Skopje; Attendance: 6,963; Referees: Kékes, Kékes (HUN)
1 December 2012; 08:00	3× (yellow card) 2× (suspension)	Report	2× (yellow card) 5× (suspension)	Boris Trajkovski Sports Center, Skopje; Attendance: 6,963; Referees: Kékes, Kékes (HUN)

1 December 2012; 14:00	St. Petersburg (Russia)	25 – 32	(Slovenia) Gorenje	Sportkompleks "Ubileyniy", St. Petersburg; Attendance: 500; Referees: Leandersson, Lindroos (FIN)
1 December 2012; 14:00	Pyshkin 4	(13–16)	Dolenec 9	Sportkompleks "Ubileyniy", St. Petersburg; Attendance: 500; Referees: Leandersson, Lindroos (FIN)
1 December 2012; 14:00	3× (yellow card) 7× (suspension)	Report	3× (yellow card) 3× (suspension)	Sportkompleks "Ubileyniy", St. Petersburg; Attendance: 500; Referees: Leandersson, Lindroos (FIN)

2 December 2012; 17:00	Bjerringbro-Silkeborg (Denmark)	25 – 34	(Poland) Vive Targi Kielce	Silkeborg-Hallerne, Silkeborg; Attendance: 1,752; Referees: Nikolić, Stojković (SRB)
2 December 2012; 17:00	three players 5	(11–18)	Jurecki, Lijewski 6	Silkeborg-Hallerne, Silkeborg; Attendance: 1,752; Referees: Nikolić, Stojković (SRB)
2 December 2012; 17:00	3× (yellow card) 5× (suspension)	Report	3× (yellow card) 4× (suspension)	Silkeborg-Hallerne, Silkeborg; Attendance: 1,752; Referees: Nikolić, Stojković (SRB)

9 February 2013; 16:30	Gorenje (Slovenia)	23 – 19	(North Macedonia) Metalurg Skopje	Red Hall, Velenje; Attendance: 1,200; Referees: Bonifert, Oláh (HUN)
9 February 2013; 16:30	Bezjak 7	(10–10)	Mojsovski 7	Red Hall, Velenje; Attendance: 1,200; Referees: Bonifert, Oláh (HUN)
9 February 2013; 16:30	3× (yellow card) 4× (suspension)	Report	3× (yellow card) 5× (suspension)	Red Hall, Velenje; Attendance: 1,200; Referees: Bonifert, Oláh (HUN)

9 February 2013; 17:00	Vive Targi Kielce (Poland)	30 – 29	(Russia) St. Petersburg	Hala Legionów, Kielce; Attendance: 4,000; Referees: Kurtagic, Wetterwik (SWE)
9 February 2013; 17:00	Jachlewski 6	(20–14)	three players 5	Hala Legionów, Kielce; Attendance: 4,000; Referees: Kurtagic, Wetterwik (SWE)
9 February 2013; 17:00	3× (yellow card) 2× (suspension)	Report	3× (yellow card) 2× (suspension)	Hala Legionów, Kielce; Attendance: 4,000; Referees: Kurtagic, Wetterwik (SWE)

10 February 2013; 17:00	Chambéry (France)	29 – 26	(Denmark) Bjerringbro-Silkeborg	Le Phare, Chambéry; Attendance: 3,200; Referees: Lorente, Serradilla (ESP)
10 February 2013; 17:00	Marroux, Nguessan 6	(14–12)	Mortensen 6	Le Phare, Chambéry; Attendance: 3,200; Referees: Lorente, Serradilla (ESP)
10 February 2013; 17:00	3× (yellow card) 2× (suspension)	Report	3× (yellow card) 6× (suspension)	Le Phare, Chambéry; Attendance: 3,200; Referees: Lorente, Serradilla (ESP)

16 February 2013; 17:00	Vive Targi Kielce (Poland)	36 – 32	(France) Chambéry	Hala Legionów, Kielce; Attendance: 4,000; Referees: Buache, Meyer (SUI)
16 February 2013; 17:00	Jachlewski, Jurecki 8	(18–17)	Paty 9	Hala Legionów, Kielce; Attendance: 4,000; Referees: Buache, Meyer (SUI)
16 February 2013; 17:00	2× (yellow card) 6× (suspension)	Report	1× (yellow card) 3× (suspension)	Hala Legionów, Kielce; Attendance: 4,000; Referees: Buache, Meyer (SUI)

16 February 2013; 19:00	St. Petersburg (Russia)	14 – 32	(North Macedonia) Metalurg Skopje	Sportkompleks "Ubileyniy", St. Petersburg; Attendance: 300; Referees: Caçador, Nicolau (POR)
16 February 2013; 19:00	Semenov 4	(10–18)	Mojsovski, Vugrinec 7	Sportkompleks "Ubileyniy", St. Petersburg; Attendance: 300; Referees: Caçador, Nicolau (POR)
16 February 2013; 19:00	2× (yellow card) 3× (suspension)	Report	3× (yellow card) 3× (suspension)	Sportkompleks "Ubileyniy", St. Petersburg; Attendance: 300; Referees: Caçador, Nicolau (POR)

17 February 2013; 17:00	Bjerringbro-Silkeborg (Denmark)	27 – 26	(Slovenia) Gorenje	Silkeborg-Hallerne, Silkeborg; Attendance: 1,856; Referees: Hakansson, Nilsson (SWE)
17 February 2013; 17:00	Lauge Schmidt 7	(12–14)	Dolenec 9	Silkeborg-Hallerne, Silkeborg; Attendance: 1,856; Referees: Hakansson, Nilsson (SWE)
17 February 2013; 17:00	3× (yellow card) 3× (suspension)	Report	3× (yellow card) 4× (suspension)	Silkeborg-Hallerne, Silkeborg; Attendance: 1,856; Referees: Hakansson, Nilsson (SWE)

23 February 2013; 16:30	RK Gorenje (Slovenia)	25 – 29	(Poland) Vive Targi Kielce	Red Hall, Velenje; Attendance: 1,300; Referees: Abrahamsen, Kristiansen (NOR)
23 February 2013; 16:30	Cehte 7	(14–13)	Ólafsson 7	Red Hall, Velenje; Attendance: 1,300; Referees: Abrahamsen, Kristiansen (NOR)
23 February 2013; 16:30	3× (yellow card) 1× (suspension)	Report	2× (yellow card) 3× (suspension)	Red Hall, Velenje; Attendance: 1,300; Referees: Abrahamsen, Kristiansen (NOR)

24 February 2013; 17:00	Metalurg Skopje (North Macedonia)	32 – 18	(Denmark) Bjerringbro-Silkeborg	Boris Trajkovski Sports Center, Skopje; Attendance: 6,963; Referees: Covalciuc, Covalciuc (MDA)
24 February 2013; 17:00	Kozlina 7	(18–14)	Kirkegaard, Toft Hansen 4	Boris Trajkovski Sports Center, Skopje; Attendance: 6,963; Referees: Covalciuc, Covalciuc (MDA)
24 February 2013; 17:00	3× (yellow card) 1× (suspension)	Report	3× (yellow card) 3× (suspension)	Boris Trajkovski Sports Center, Skopje; Attendance: 6,963; Referees: Covalciuc, Covalciuc (MDA)

24 February 2013; 19:00	Chambéry (France)	33 – 19	(Russia) St. Petersburg	Le Phare, Chambéry; Attendance: 3,500; Referees: Konjičanin, Konjičanin (BIH)
24 February 2013; 19:00	Paty 7	(19–8)	Semenov 5	Le Phare, Chambéry; Attendance: 3,500; Referees: Konjičanin, Konjičanin (BIH)
24 February 2013; 19:00	2× (yellow card) 2× (suspension)	Report	3× (yellow card) 5× (suspension)	Le Phare, Chambéry; Attendance: 3,500; Referees: Konjičanin, Konjičanin (BIH)

Notes

- Note 1: AG København was seeded in pot 1 for the 2012–13 EHF Champions League group stage draw, which took place in Vienna, Austria, on 6 July 2012. However, the club filed for bankruptcy on July 31, 2012, and their place in the group stage was awarded to Bjerringbro-Silkeborg.

=== Group D ===
Team	Pld	W	D	L	GF	GA	GD	Pts
(Spain) Barcelona Intersport	10	9	0	1	321	252	+69	18
(Germany) Füchse Berlin	10	8	0	2	290	279	+11	16
(Belarus) Dinamo-Minsk	10	5	1	4	276	259	+17	11
(Hungary) Pick Szeged	10	3	0	7	260	293	−33	6
(Croatia) Zagreb	10	2	1	7	266	284	−18	5
(Switzerland) Schaffhausen	10	2	0	8	284	330	−46	4

27 September 2012; 20:00	Kadetten Schaffhausen (Switzerland)	23 – 33	(Spain) Barcelona Intersport	Schweizersbildhalle, Schaffhausen; Attendance: 2,900; Referees: Krstić, Ljubić (SLO)
27 September 2012; 20:00	Stojanović 4	(12–17)	Rocas, Sorhaindo 5	Schweizersbildhalle, Schaffhausen; Attendance: 2,900; Referees: Krstić, Ljubić (SLO)
27 September 2012; 20:00	3× (yellow card) 3× (suspension)	Report	3× (yellow card) 2× (suspension)	Schweizersbildhalle, Schaffhausen; Attendance: 2,900; Referees: Krstić, Ljubić (SLO)

29 September 2012; 18:30	Zagreb (Croatia)	30 – 27	(Hungary) Pick Szeged	Dom Sportova, Zagreb; Attendance: 4,000; Referees: Covalciuc, Covalciuc (MDA)
29 September 2012; 18:30	Šprem 6	(15–8)	Prodanović 6	Dom Sportova, Zagreb; Attendance: 4,000; Referees: Covalciuc, Covalciuc (MDA)
29 September 2012; 18:30	3× (yellow card) 5× (suspension)	Report		Dom Sportova, Zagreb; Attendance: 4,000; Referees: Covalciuc, Covalciuc (MDA)

30 September 2012; 16:15	Füchse Berlin (Germany)	29 – 25	(Belarus) Dinamo-Minsk	Max-Schmeling-Halle, Berlin; Attendance: 3,813; Referees: Leifsson, Pálsson (ISL)
30 September 2012; 16:15	Ninčević 8	(13–13)	Atman, Ševaljević 5	Max-Schmeling-Halle, Berlin; Attendance: 3,813; Referees: Leifsson, Pálsson (ISL)
30 September 2012; 16:15	3× (yellow card) 1× (suspension)	Report	3× (yellow card) 3× (suspension)	Max-Schmeling-Halle, Berlin; Attendance: 3,813; Referees: Leifsson, Pálsson (ISL)

4 October 2012; 19:30	Dinamo-Minsk (Belarus)	27 – 27	(Croatia) Zagreb	Dynama, Minsk; Attendance: 3,200; Referees: Stenrand, Birch (DEN)
4 October 2012; 19:30	Atman 7	(14–11)	Valčić 6	Dynama, Minsk; Attendance: 3,200; Referees: Stenrand, Birch (DEN)
4 October 2012; 19:30	3× (yellow card) 3× (suspension)	Report	3× (yellow card) 1× (suspension)	Dynama, Minsk; Attendance: 3,200; Referees: Stenrand, Birch (DEN)

6 October 2012; 16:15	Barcelona Intersport (Spain)	34 – 23	(Germany) Füchse Berlin	Palau Blaugrana, Barcelona; Attendance: 2,318; Referees: Nikolov, Nachevski (MKD)
6 October 2012; 16:15	Rutenka 8	(15–10)	Pevnov 5	Palau Blaugrana, Barcelona; Attendance: 2,318; Referees: Nikolov, Nachevski (MKD)
6 October 2012; 16:15	3× (yellow card) 4× (suspension)	Report	3× (yellow card) 3× (suspension)	Palau Blaugrana, Barcelona; Attendance: 2,318; Referees: Nikolov, Nachevski (MKD)

6 October 2012; 17:15	Pick Szeged (Hungary)	30 – 29	(Switzerland) Kadetten Schaffhausen	Városi Sportcsarnok, Szeged; Attendance: 3,000; Referees: Dentz, Reibel (FRA)
6 October 2012; 17:15	Šulc 11	(12–14)	three players 5	Városi Sportcsarnok, Szeged; Attendance: 3,000; Referees: Dentz, Reibel (FRA)
6 October 2012; 17:15	2× (yellow card) 6× (suspension)	Report	3× (yellow card) 6× (suspension)	Városi Sportcsarnok, Szeged; Attendance: 3,000; Referees: Dentz, Reibel (FRA)

11 October 2012; 20:00	Kadetten Schaffhausen (Switzerland)	28 – 27	(Croatia) Zagreb	Schweizersbildhalle, Schaffhausen; Attendance: 2,150; Referees: Cohen, Peretz (ISR)
11 October 2012; 20:00	Dissinger 6	(16–15)	Marić 9	Schweizersbildhalle, Schaffhausen; Attendance: 2,150; Referees: Cohen, Peretz (ISR)
11 October 2012; 20:00	3× (yellow card) 3× (suspension)	Report	3× (yellow card) 7× (suspension)	Schweizersbildhalle, Schaffhausen; Attendance: 2,150; Referees: Cohen, Peretz (ISR)

13 October 2012; 16:15	Barcelona Intersport (Spain)	25 – 24	(Belarus) Dinamo-Minsk	Palau Blaugrana, Barcelona; Attendance: 1,888; Referees: Pavićević, Ražnatović (MNE)
13 October 2012; 16:15	Sarmiento Melián 5	(12–13)	Ostroushko 5	Palau Blaugrana, Barcelona; Attendance: 1,888; Referees: Pavićević, Ražnatović (MNE)
13 October 2012; 16:15	3× (yellow card) 1× (suspension)	Report	3× (yellow card) 3× (suspension)	Palau Blaugrana, Barcelona; Attendance: 1,888; Referees: Pavićević, Ražnatović (MNE)

14 October 2012; 16:00	Pick Szeged (Hungary)	22 – 29	(Germany) Füchse Berlin	Városi Sportcsarnok, Szeged; Attendance: 3,000; Referees: Hansen, Pettersen (NOR)
14 October 2012; 16:00	Balogh 5	(14–14)	Ninčević 7	Városi Sportcsarnok, Szeged; Attendance: 3,000; Referees: Hansen, Pettersen (NOR)
14 October 2012; 16:00	3× (yellow card) 4× (suspension)	Report	3× (yellow card) 5× (suspension)	Városi Sportcsarnok, Szeged; Attendance: 3,000; Referees: Hansen, Pettersen (NOR)

17 October 2012; 19:00	Füchse Berlin (Germany)	31 – 27	(Switzerland) Kadetten Schaffhausen	Max-Schmeling-Halle, Berlin; Attendance: 5,259; Referees: Baďura, Ondogrecula (SVK)
17 October 2012; 19:00	Bult, Richwien 5	(14–11)	Mamić 9	Max-Schmeling-Halle, Berlin; Attendance: 5,259; Referees: Baďura, Ondogrecula (SVK)
17 October 2012; 19:00	2× (yellow card) 4× (suspension)	Report	3× (yellow card) 4× (suspension)	Max-Schmeling-Halle, Berlin; Attendance: 5,259; Referees: Baďura, Ondogrecula (SVK)

18 October 2012; 18:30	Dinamo-Minsk (Belarus)	29 – 24	(Hungary) Pick Szeged	Dynama, Minsk; Attendance: 3,250; Referees: Dinu, Din (ROU)
18 October 2012; 18:30	Ševaljević 9	(17–10)	Larholm, Zubai 4	Dynama, Minsk; Attendance: 3,250; Referees: Dinu, Din (ROU)
18 October 2012; 18:30	3× (yellow card) 4× (suspension)	Report	2× (yellow card) 4× (suspension)	Dynama, Minsk; Attendance: 3,250; Referees: Dinu, Din (ROU)

20 October 2012; 18:00	Zagreb (Croatia)	21 – 32	(Spain) Barcelona Intersport	Arena Zagreb, Zagreb; Attendance: 10,000; Referees: Caçador, Nicolau (POR)
20 October 2012; 18:00	Horvat, Stepančić 6	(12–13)	García 6	Arena Zagreb, Zagreb; Attendance: 10,000; Referees: Caçador, Nicolau (POR)
20 October 2012; 18:00	3× (yellow card) 1× (suspension)	Report	3× (yellow card)	Arena Zagreb, Zagreb; Attendance: 10,000; Referees: Caçador, Nicolau (POR)

15 November 2012; 19:30	Füchse Berlin (Germany)	29 – 27	(Croatia) Zagreb	Max-Schmeling-Halle, Berlin; Attendance: 5,385; Referees: Poulsen, Mortensen (DEN)
15 November 2012; 19:30	Romero 8	(12–13)	three players 5	Max-Schmeling-Halle, Berlin; Attendance: 5,385; Referees: Poulsen, Mortensen (DEN)
15 November 2012; 19:30	3× (yellow card) 2× (suspension)	Report	2× (yellow card) 3× (suspension)	Max-Schmeling-Halle, Berlin; Attendance: 5,385; Referees: Poulsen, Mortensen (DEN)

15 November 2012; 20:00	Dinamo-Minsk (Belarus)	33 – 23	(Switzerland) Kadetten Schaffhausen	Dynama, Minsk; Attendance: 2,950; Referees: Nikolov, Nachevski (MKD)
15 November 2012; 20:00	Atman, Onufryienko 7	(14–12)	Stojanović 7	Dynama, Minsk; Attendance: 2,950; Referees: Nikolov, Nachevski (MKD)
15 November 2012; 20:00	3× (yellow card) 3× (suspension)	Report	3× (yellow card) 4× (suspension)	Dynama, Minsk; Attendance: 2,950; Referees: Nikolov, Nachevski (MKD)

18 November 2012; 18:30	Pick Szeged (Hungary)	28 – 33	(Spain) Barcelona Intersport	Városi Sportcsarnok, Szeged; Attendance: 3,200; Referees: Nikolić, Stojković (SRB)
18 November 2012; 18:30	Larholm, Šulc 8	(15–18)	Rocas 7	Városi Sportcsarnok, Szeged; Attendance: 3,200; Referees: Nikolić, Stojković (SRB)
18 November 2012; 18:30	2× (yellow card) 6× (suspension)	Report	3× (yellow card) 3× (suspension)	Városi Sportcsarnok, Szeged; Attendance: 3,200; Referees: Nikolić, Stojković (SRB)

22 November 2012; 20:00	Kadetten Schaffhausen (Switzerland)	28 – 33	(Belarus) Dinamo-Minsk	Schweizersbildhalle, Schaffhausen; Attendance: 1,750; Referees: Togstad, Kristiansen (NOR)
22 November 2012; 20:00	Pendić 8	(14–16)	Babichev, Ševaljević 6	Schweizersbildhalle, Schaffhausen; Attendance: 1,750; Referees: Togstad, Kristiansen (NOR)
22 November 2012; 20:00	3× (yellow card) 5× (suspension)	Report	3× (yellow card) 8× (suspension) 1× (red card)	Schweizersbildhalle, Schaffhausen; Attendance: 1,750; Referees: Togstad, Kristiansen (NOR)

24 November 2012; 16:15	Barcelona Intersport (Spain)	33 – 24	(Hungary) Pick Szeged	Palau Blaugrana, Barcelona; Attendance: 2,018; Referees: Krstić, Ljubić (SLO)
24 November 2012; 16:15	Rocas 5	(16–13)	Šulc 6	Palau Blaugrana, Barcelona; Attendance: 2,018; Referees: Krstić, Ljubić (SLO)
24 November 2012; 16:15	3× (yellow card) 2× (suspension)	Report	4× (yellow card) 5× (suspension)	Palau Blaugrana, Barcelona; Attendance: 2,018; Referees: Krstić, Ljubić (SLO)

24 November 2012; 18:00	Zagreb (Croatia)	24 – 25	(Germany) Füchse Berlin	Arena Zagreb, Zagreb; Attendance: 7,500; Referees: Stark, Stefan (ROU)
24 November 2012; 18:00	Stepančić 8	(12–9)	Sellin 7	Arena Zagreb, Zagreb; Attendance: 7,500; Referees: Stark, Stefan (ROU)
24 November 2012; 18:00	3× (yellow card) 3× (suspension)	Report	3× (yellow card) 2× (suspension)	Arena Zagreb, Zagreb; Attendance: 7,500; Referees: Stark, Stefan (ROU)

1 December 2012; 16:15	Barcelona Intersport (Spain)	36 – 25	(Switzerland) Kadetten Schaffhausen	Palau Blaugrana, Barcelona; Attendance: 2,315; Referees: Dentz, Reibel (FRA)
1 December 2012; 16:15	Nøddesbo 7	(19–13)	Starczan 6	Palau Blaugrana, Barcelona; Attendance: 2,315; Referees: Dentz, Reibel (FRA)
1 December 2012; 16:15	3× (yellow card) 2× (suspension)	Report	3× (yellow card) 3× (suspension)	Palau Blaugrana, Barcelona; Attendance: 2,315; Referees: Dentz, Reibel (FRA)

1 December 2012; 17:15	Pick Szeged (Hungary)	26 – 24	(Croatia) Zagreb	Városi Sportcsarnok, Szeged; Attendance: 3,200; Referees: Abrahamsen, Kristiansen (NOR)
1 December 2012; 17:15	Šulc 9	(16–10)	Stepančić 6	Városi Sportcsarnok, Szeged; Attendance: 3,200; Referees: Abrahamsen, Kristiansen (NOR)
1 December 2012; 17:15	3× (yellow card) 2× (suspension)	Report	3× (yellow card) 4× (suspension)	Városi Sportcsarnok, Szeged; Attendance: 3,200; Referees: Abrahamsen, Kristiansen (NOR)

2 December 2012; 17:30	Dinamo-Minsk (Belarus)	31 – 24	(Germany) Füchse Berlin	Dynama, Minsk; Attendance: 3,000; Referees: Pandžić, Mosorinsk (SRB)
2 December 2012; 17:30	Onufryienko 9	(16–15)	Jaszka 6	Dynama, Minsk; Attendance: 3,000; Referees: Pandžić, Mosorinsk (SRB)
2 December 2012; 17:30	3× (yellow card) 4× (suspension)	Report	3× (yellow card) 3× (suspension)	Dynama, Minsk; Attendance: 3,000; Referees: Pandžić, Mosorinsk (SRB)

7 February 2013; 20:00	Kadetten Schaffhausen (Switzerland)	36 – 29	(Hungary) Pick Szeged	Schweizersbildhalle, Schaffhausen; Attendance: 1,870; Referees: Pavićević, Ražnatović (MNE)
7 February 2013; 20:00	Kukučka, Pendic 8	(21–14)	Šulc 10	Schweizersbildhalle, Schaffhausen; Attendance: 1,870; Referees: Pavićević, Ražnatović (MNE)
7 February 2013; 20:00	3× (yellow card) 4× (suspension)	Report	3× (yellow card) 2× (suspension)	Schweizersbildhalle, Schaffhausen; Attendance: 1,870; Referees: Pavićević, Ražnatović (MNE)

9 February 2013; 18:00	Zagreb (Croatia)	23 – 25	(Belarus) Dinamo-Minsk	Arena Zagreb, Zagreb; Attendance: 9,000; Referees: Krstić, Ljubić (SLO)
9 February 2013; 18:00	Horvat 9	(10–14)	Atman, Onufryienko 6	Arena Zagreb, Zagreb; Attendance: 9,000; Referees: Krstić, Ljubić (SLO)
9 February 2013; 18:00	2× (yellow card) 2× (suspension)	Report	3× (yellow card) 6× (suspension)	Arena Zagreb, Zagreb; Attendance: 9,000; Referees: Krstić, Ljubić (SLO)

10 February 2013; 17:15	Füchse Berlin (Germany)	31 – 30	(Spain) Barcelona Intersport	Max-Schmeling-Halle, Berlin; Attendance: 13,333; Referees: Abrahamsen, Kristiansen (NOR)
10 February 2013; 17:15	Ninčević 6	(14–16)	Tomás 8	Max-Schmeling-Halle, Berlin; Attendance: 13,333; Referees: Abrahamsen, Kristiansen (NOR)
10 February 2013; 17:15	3× (yellow card) 3× (suspension)	Report	3× (yellow card) 2× (suspension)	Max-Schmeling-Halle, Berlin; Attendance: 13,333; Referees: Abrahamsen, Kristiansen (NOR)

14 February 2013; 20:00	Kadetten Schaffhausen (Switzerland)	35 – 40	(Germany) Füchse Berlin	Schweizersbildhalle, Schaffhausen; Attendance: 3,500; Referees: Stenrand, Birch (DEN)
14 February 2013; 20:00	Pendić 8	(16–21)	Ninčević 8	Schweizersbildhalle, Schaffhausen; Attendance: 3,500; Referees: Stenrand, Birch (DEN)
14 February 2013; 20:00	3× (yellow card) 3× (suspension)	Report	3× (yellow card) 4× (suspension)	Schweizersbildhalle, Schaffhausen; Attendance: 3,500; Referees: Stenrand, Birch (DEN)

16 February 2013; 15:30	Pick Szeged (Hungary)	26 – 21	(Belarus) Dinamo-Minsk	Városi Sportcsarnok, Szeged; Attendance: 3,000; Referees: Poulsen, Mortensen (DEN)
16 February 2013; 15:30	Ancsin 7	(12–5)	Ševaljević 6	Városi Sportcsarnok, Szeged; Attendance: 3,000; Referees: Poulsen, Mortensen (DEN)
16 February 2013; 15:30	3× (yellow card) 5× (suspension)	Report	3× (yellow card) 4× (suspension)	Városi Sportcsarnok, Szeged; Attendance: 3,000; Referees: Poulsen, Mortensen (DEN)

16 February 2013; 16:15	Barcelona Intersport (Spain)	35 – 25	(Croatia) Zagreb	Palau Blaugrana, Barcelona; Attendance: 1,784; Referees: Dinu, Din (ROU)
16 February 2013; 16:15	Tomás 6	(19–10)	Valčić 5	Palau Blaugrana, Barcelona; Attendance: 1,784; Referees: Dinu, Din (ROU)
16 February 2013; 16:15	3× (yellow card)	Report	3× (yellow card) 4× (suspension)	Palau Blaugrana, Barcelona; Attendance: 1,784; Referees: Dinu, Din (ROU)

21 February 2013; 20:00	Dinamo-Minsk (Belarus)	28 – 30	(Spain) Barcelona Intersport	Dynama, Minsk; Attendance: 4,100; Referees: Baďura, Ondogrecula (SVK)
21 February 2013; 20:00	Ševaljević 8	(13–18)	Rutenka 10	Dynama, Minsk; Attendance: 4,100; Referees: Baďura, Ondogrecula (SVK)
21 February 2013; 20:00	3× (yellow card) 7× (suspension)	Report	2× (yellow card) 2× (suspension)	Dynama, Minsk; Attendance: 4,100; Referees: Baďura, Ondogrecula (SVK)

23 February 2013; 18:00	Zagreb (Croatia)	38 – 30	(Switzerland) Kadetten Schaffhausen	Arena Zagreb, Zagreb; Attendance: 6,000; Referees: Zotin, Volodkov (RUS)
23 February 2013; 18:00	Mandalinić 8	(20–13)	Pendić 9	Arena Zagreb, Zagreb; Attendance: 6,000; Referees: Zotin, Volodkov (RUS)
23 February 2013; 18:00	3× (yellow card) 2× (suspension)	Report	2× (yellow card)	Arena Zagreb, Zagreb; Attendance: 6,000; Referees: Zotin, Volodkov (RUS)

24 February 2013; 19:00	Füchse Berlin (Germany)	29 – 24	(Hungary) Pick Szeged	Max-Schmeling-Halle, Berlin; Attendance: 4,700; Referees: Erdoğan, Özdeniz (TUR)
24 February 2013; 19:00	Sellin 6	(15–10)	Šulc 7	Max-Schmeling-Halle, Berlin; Attendance: 4,700; Referees: Erdoğan, Özdeniz (TUR)
24 February 2013; 19:00	3× (yellow card) 1× (suspension)	Report	3× (yellow card) 1× (suspension)	Max-Schmeling-Halle, Berlin; Attendance: 4,700; Referees: Erdoğan, Özdeniz (TUR)
