= 2012–13 EHF Champions League qualifying =

This article describes the qualifying for the 2012–13 EHF Champions League.

== Qualification tournament ==
A total of 14 teams took part in the qualification tournaments. The clubs were drawn into three groups of four and played a semifinal and the final. The winner of the qualification groups advanced to the group stage, while the eliminated clubs went to the EHF Cup. Matches were played at 8–9 September 2011. The draw took place on July 3, at 11:00 local time at Vienna, Austria.

=== Seedings ===
The two remaining teams from Pot 1 and 4 played a knock-out match, the winner went into the group stage. The draw was held on July 3, 2012.

Pot 1	Pot 2	Pot 3	Pot 4
(Romania) HCM Constanța (Bosnia and Herzegovina) RK Sloga Doboj (North Macedonia) HC Metalurg (Belarus) HC Dinamo-Minsk	(Slovakia) HT Tatran Prešov (Norway) Haslum HK (Serbia) RK Partizan	(Ukraine) HC Dinamo-Poltava (Portugal) F.C. Porto (Israel) Maccabi Rishon LeZion	(Austria) Alpla HC Hard (Turkey) Beşiktaş J.K. (Montenegro) RK Lovcen (Italy) SSV Bozen

== Qualification tournament 1 ==
RK Partizan organized the event.

Semi-finals
8 September 2012
(Bosnia and Herzegovina) RK Sloga Doboj	25
(Montenegro) RK Lovcen	23
8 September 2012
(Serbia) RK Partizan	27
(Portugal) F.C. Porto	25

Final
9 September 2012
(Bosnia and Herzegovina) RK Sloga Doboj	16
(Serbia) RK Partizan	31
Third place
9 September 2012
(Montenegro) RK Lovcen	25
(Portugal) F.C. Porto	31

=== Semifinals ===
8 September 2012; 17:00	RK Partizan (Serbia)	27 – 25	(Portugal) F.C. Porto	Banjica Sport Hall, Belgrade; Attendance: 2,000; Referees: Gjeding, Hansen (DEN)
8 September 2012; 17:00	Kostadinović, Mitrović 5	(14–13)	Moreira 7	Banjica Sport Hall, Belgrade; Attendance: 2,000; Referees: Gjeding, Hansen (DEN)
8 September 2012; 17:00	3× (yellow card) 7× (suspension)	Report	1× (yellow card) 3× (suspension) 1× (red card)	Banjica Sport Hall, Belgrade; Attendance: 2,000; Referees: Gjeding, Hansen (DEN)

8 September 2012; 19:30	RK Sloga Doboj (Bosnia and Herzegovina)	25 – 23	(Montenegro) RK Lovcen	Banjica Sport Hall, Belgrade; Attendance: 450; Referees: Kaveshnikov, Plotnikov (RUS)
8 September 2012; 19:30	Pesić 7	(13–10)	Marković 9	Banjica Sport Hall, Belgrade; Attendance: 450; Referees: Kaveshnikov, Plotnikov (RUS)
8 September 2012; 19:30	2× (yellow card) 4× (suspension)	Report	3× (yellow card) 5× (suspension)	Banjica Sport Hall, Belgrade; Attendance: 450; Referees: Kaveshnikov, Plotnikov (RUS)

=== Third place game ===
9 September 2012; 17:00	RK Lovcen (Montenegro)	25 – 31	(Portugal) F.C. Porto	Banjica Sport Hall, Belgrade; Attendance: 200; Referees: Kaveshnikov, Plotnikov (RUS)
9 September 2012; 17:00	Jovetić 6	(10–14)	Davyes 9	Banjica Sport Hall, Belgrade; Attendance: 200; Referees: Kaveshnikov, Plotnikov (RUS)
9 September 2012; 17:00	2× (yellow card) 3× (suspension)	Report	2× (yellow card) 3× (suspension)	Banjica Sport Hall, Belgrade; Attendance: 200; Referees: Kaveshnikov, Plotnikov (RUS)

=== Final ===
9 September 2012; 19:30	RK Sloga Doboj (Bosnia and Herzegovina)	16 – 31	(Serbia) RK Partizan	Banjica Sport Hall, Belgrade; Attendance: 2,000; Referees: Gjeding, Hansen (DEN)
9 September 2012; 19:30	Pesić 8	(8–15)	Maksić 8	Banjica Sport Hall, Belgrade; Attendance: 2,000; Referees: Gjeding, Hansen (DEN)
9 September 2012; 19:30	3× (yellow card) 1× (suspension)	Report	3× (suspension)	Banjica Sport Hall, Belgrade; Attendance: 2,000; Referees: Gjeding, Hansen (DEN)

== Qualification tournament 2 ==
Haslum HK organized the event.

Semi-finals
8 September 2012
(North Macedonia) HC Metalurg	25
(Austria) Alpla HC Hard	19
8 September 2012
(Norway) Haslum HK	29
(Ukraine) HC Dinamo-Poltava	28

Final
9 September 2012
(North Macedonia) HC Metalurg	30
(Norway) Haslum HK	20
Third place
9 September 2012
(Austria) Alpla HC Hard	29
(Ukraine) HC Dinamo-Poltava	23

=== Semifinals ===
8 September 2012; 14:00	HC Metalurg (North Macedonia)	25 – 19	(Austria) Alpla HC Hard	Haslumhallen, Rykkinn; Attendance: 310; Referees: Bonifert, Oláh (HUN)
8 September 2012; 14:00	Mojsovski 6	(10–5)	Glusaks 5	Haslumhallen, Rykkinn; Attendance: 310; Referees: Bonifert, Oláh (HUN)
8 September 2012; 14:00	1× (yellow card) 5× (suspension)	Report	3× (yellow card) 4× (suspension)	Haslumhallen, Rykkinn; Attendance: 310; Referees: Bonifert, Oláh (HUN)

8 September 2012
16:30
Haslum HK (Norway)
29 – 28 (ET)
(Ukraine) HC Dinamo-Poltava
Haslumhallen, Rykkinn
Attendance: 750
Referees: Cohen, Peretz (ISR)
Roe 6
(9–13)
Vasyuk 9
3× (yellow card) 7× (suspension)
Report
3× (yellow card) 5× (suspension)

FT: 24–24 ET: 5–4

=== Third place game ===
9 September 2012; 14:00	Alpla HC Hard (Austria)	29 – 23	(Ukraine) HC Dinamo-Poltava	Haslumhallen, Rykkinn; Attendance: 173; Referees: Bonifert, Oláh (HUN)
9 September 2012; 14:00	Krsmančić 9	Report	Shindin 6	Haslumhallen, Rykkinn; Attendance: 173; Referees: Bonifert, Oláh (HUN)
9 September 2012; 14:00	3× (yellow card) 6× (suspension) 1× (red card)		2× (yellow card) 8× (suspension) 1× (red card)	Haslumhallen, Rykkinn; Attendance: 173; Referees: Bonifert, Oláh (HUN)

=== Final ===
9 September 2012; 16:30	HC Metalurg (North Macedonia)	30 – 20	(Norway) Haslum HK	Haslumhallen, Rykkinn; Attendance: 1,150; Referees: Cohen, Peretz (ISR)
9 September 2012; 16:30	Mirkulovski 8	(16–8)	four players 3	Haslumhallen, Rykkinn; Attendance: 1,150; Referees: Cohen, Peretz (ISR)
9 September 2012; 16:30	3× (yellow card) 4× (suspension)	Report	3× (yellow card) 2× (suspension)	Haslumhallen, Rykkinn; Attendance: 1,150; Referees: Cohen, Peretz (ISR)

== Qualification tournament 3 ==
HCM Constanța organized the event.

Semi-finals
8 September 2012
(Romania) HCM Constanța	33
(Italy) SSV Bozen	22
8 September 2012
(Slovakia) HT Tatran Prešov	36
(Israel) Maccabi Rishon LeZion	20

Final
9 September 2012
(Romania) HCM Constanța	26
(Slovakia) HT Tatran Prešov	21
Third place
9 September 2012
(Italy) SSV Bozen	30
(Israel) Maccabi Rishon LeZion	33

=== Semifinals ===
8 September 2012; 18:00	HCM Constanța (Romania)	33 – 22	(Italy) SSV Bozen	Sala Sporturilor, Constanța; Attendance: 1,500; Referees: Jurinović, Mrvica (CRO)
8 September 2012; 18:00	Csepreghi 6	(16–12)	Turković 6	Sala Sporturilor, Constanța; Attendance: 1,500; Referees: Jurinović, Mrvica (CRO)
8 September 2012; 18:00	3× (yellow card) 5× (suspension)	Report	2× (yellow card) 6× (suspension)	Sala Sporturilor, Constanța; Attendance: 1,500; Referees: Jurinović, Mrvica (CRO)

8 September 2012; 20:30	HT Tatran Prešov (Slovakia)	36 – 20	(Israel) Maccabi Rishon LeZion	Sala Sporturilor, Constanța; Attendance: 150; Referees: Olesen, Pedersen (DEN)
8 September 2012; 20:30	Číp 7	(11–8)	Friedmann 4	Sala Sporturilor, Constanța; Attendance: 150; Referees: Olesen, Pedersen (DEN)
8 September 2012; 20:30	6× (suspension)	Report	5× (suspension) 1× (red card)	Sala Sporturilor, Constanța; Attendance: 150; Referees: Olesen, Pedersen (DEN)

=== Third place game ===
9 September 2012; 18:00	SSV Bozen (Italy)	30 – 33	(Israel) Maccabi Rishon LeZion	Sala Sporturilor, Constanța; Attendance: 300; Referees: Olesen, Pedersen (DEN)
9 September 2012; 18:00	Radovcić 8	(19–14)	Rosental 9	Sala Sporturilor, Constanța; Attendance: 300; Referees: Olesen, Pedersen (DEN)
9 September 2012; 18:00	3× (yellow card) 7× (suspension)	Report	3× (yellow card) 8× (suspension)	Sala Sporturilor, Constanța; Attendance: 300; Referees: Olesen, Pedersen (DEN)

=== Final ===
9 September 2012; 20:30	HCM Constanța (Romania)	26 – 21	(Slovakia) HT Tatran Prešov	Sala Sporturilor, Constanța; Attendance: 1,500; Referees: Jurinović, Mrvica (CRO)
9 September 2012; 20:30	Toma 7	(16–10)	Krištopāns, Rábek 4	Sala Sporturilor, Constanța; Attendance: 1,500; Referees: Jurinović, Mrvica (CRO)
9 September 2012; 20:30	3× (yellow card) 2× (suspension) 1× (red card)	Report	3× (yellow card) 3× (suspension) 1× (red card)	Sala Sporturilor, Constanța; Attendance: 1,500; Referees: Jurinović, Mrvica (CRO)

== Play-off ==
HC Dinamo-Minsk and Beşiktaş J.K. played a playoff series to determine a participant for the group stage.

8 September 2012; 18:30	Beşiktaş J.K. (Turkey)	22 – 30	(Belarus) HC Dinamo-Minsk	Süleyman Seba Sport Complex, Istanbul; Attendance: 1,500; Referees: Andorka, Hucker (HUN)
8 September 2012; 18:30	Arifoglu 7	(9–15)	Atman 9	Süleyman Seba Sport Complex, Istanbul; Attendance: 1,500; Referees: Andorka, Hucker (HUN)
8 September 2012; 18:30	3× (yellow card)	Report	3× (yellow card) 2× (suspension)	Süleyman Seba Sport Complex, Istanbul; Attendance: 1,500; Referees: Andorka, Hucker (HUN)

9 September 2012; 16:00	HC Dinamo-Minsk (Belarus)	31 – 24	(Turkey) Beşiktaş J.K.	Minsk Sports Palace, Minsk; Attendance: 1,500; Referees: Andorka, Hucker (HUN)
9 September 2012; 16:00	three players 4	(14–13)	Arifoglu 6	Minsk Sports Palace, Minsk; Attendance: 1,500; Referees: Andorka, Hucker (HUN)
9 September 2012; 16:00	3× (yellow card) 3× (suspension)	Report	3× (yellow card) 6× (suspension)	Minsk Sports Palace, Minsk; Attendance: 1,500; Referees: Andorka, Hucker (HUN)

Dinamo-Minsk wins 61–46 on aggregate.

== Wild card tournament ==
Saint-Raphaël Var HB was awarded the right to organize the tournament.

Semi-finals
8 September 2012
(Germany) HSV Hamburg	28
(Poland) Wisła Płock	26
8 September 2012
(France) Saint-Raphaël Var HB	28
(Slovenia) RK Cimos Koper	23

Final
9 September 2012
(Germany) HSV Hamburg	32
(France) Saint-Raphaël Var HB	31
Third place
9 September 2012
(Poland) Wisła Płock	27
(Slovenia) RK Cimos Koper	22

- Note 1: RK Cimos Koper was invited to the Wild card tournament to replace Bjerringbro-Silkeborg, who replaced AG København in the group stage.

=== Semifinals ===
8 September 2012; 16:30	HSV Hamburg (Germany)	28 – 26	(Poland) Wisła Płock	Palais des Sports Intercommunal, Saint-Raphaël; Attendance: 800; Referees: López, Ramírez (ESP)
8 September 2012; 16:30	Lindberg 6	(15–16)	Ghionea 11	Palais des Sports Intercommunal, Saint-Raphaël; Attendance: 800; Referees: López, Ramírez (ESP)
8 September 2012; 16:30	3× (yellow card) 3× (suspension)	Report	2× (yellow card) 3× (suspension)	Palais des Sports Intercommunal, Saint-Raphaël; Attendance: 800; Referees: López, Ramírez (ESP)

8 September 2012; 19:00	Saint-Raphaël Var HB (France)	28 – 23	(Slovenia) RK Cimos Koper	Palais des Sports Intercommunal, Saint-Raphaël; Attendance: 1,200; Referees: Opava, Valek (CZE)
8 September 2012; 19:00	Caucheteux 6	(13–13)	Brumen 10	Palais des Sports Intercommunal, Saint-Raphaël; Attendance: 1,200; Referees: Opava, Valek (CZE)
8 September 2012; 19:00	3× (yellow card) 3× (suspension)	Report	3× (yellow card) 6× (suspension)	Palais des Sports Intercommunal, Saint-Raphaël; Attendance: 1,200; Referees: Opava, Valek (CZE)

=== Third place game ===
9 September 2012; 16:00	Wisła Płock (Poland)	27 – 22	(Slovenia) RK Cimos Koper	Palais des Sports Intercommunal, Saint-Raphaël; Attendance: 500; Referees: Opava, Valek (CZE)
9 September 2012; 16:00	Nenadić 7	(12–10)	Brumen 11	Palais des Sports Intercommunal, Saint-Raphaël; Attendance: 500; Referees: Opava, Valek (CZE)
9 September 2012; 16:00	2× (yellow card) 5× (suspension) 1× (red card)	Report	3× (yellow card) 5× (suspension)	Palais des Sports Intercommunal, Saint-Raphaël; Attendance: 500; Referees: Opava, Valek (CZE)

=== Final ===
9 September 2012
19:00
HSV Hamburg (Germany)
32 – 31 (ET)
(France) Saint-Raphaël Var HB
Palais des Sports Intercommunal, Saint-Raphaël
Attendance: 1,200
Referees: López, Ramírez (ESP)
Lindberg 8
(13–15)
Meganem 8
2× (yellow card) 2× (suspension)
Report
2× (yellow card) 3× (suspension)

FT: 27–27 ET: 5–4
