= Mateusz Jachlewski =

Polish handball player (born 1984)

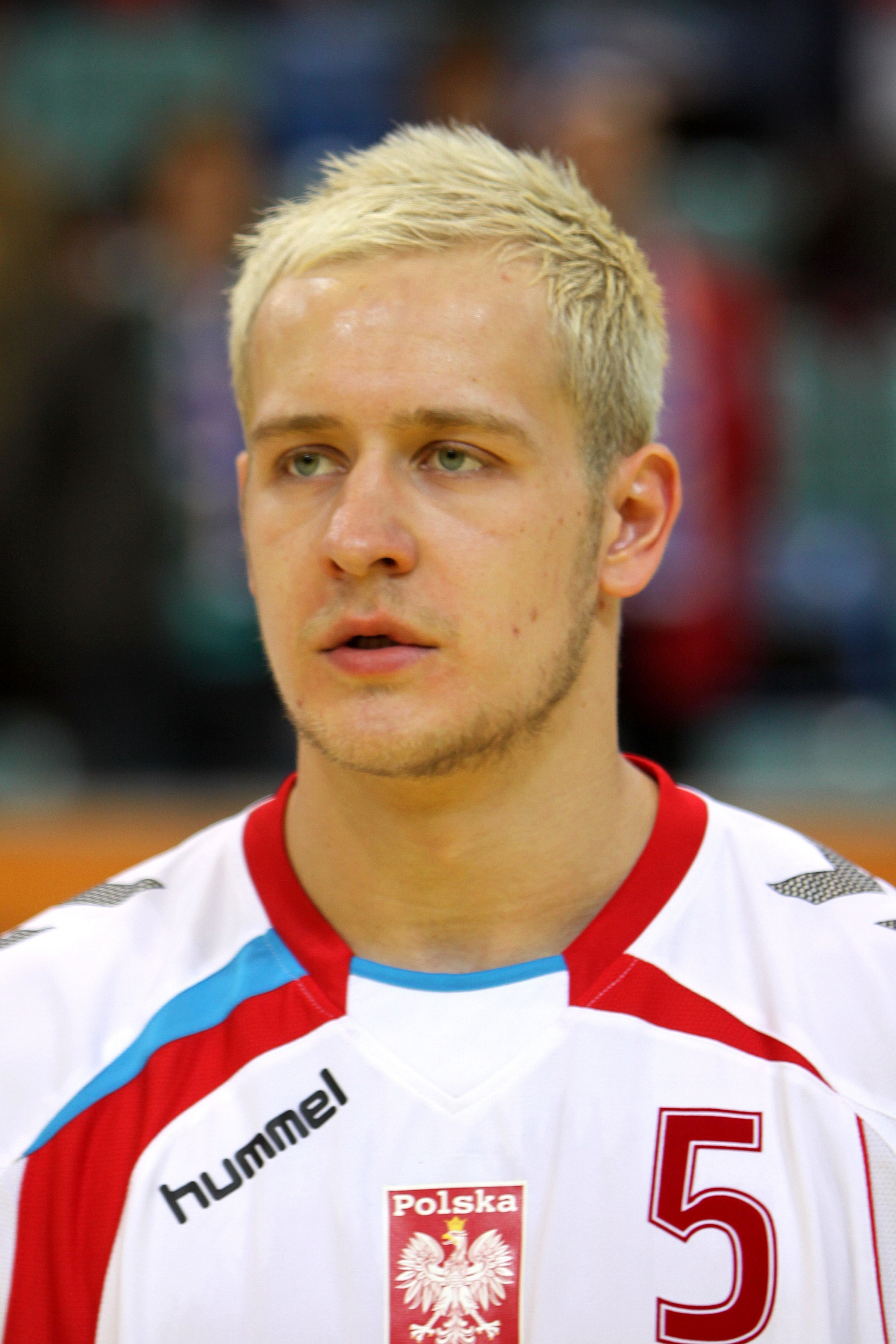

Personal information
- Nationality: Polish
- Born: 27 December 1984 (age 41) Gdynia, Poland
- Height: 1.84 m (6 ft 0 in)

Sport
- Sport: Handball
- Position: Centre back, Left wing
- Current club: Retired
- Number: 15

Senior clubs
- Years: Team
- 1993–2003: SMS Gdańsk
- 2003–2006: AZS AWFiS Gdańsk
- 2006–2020: Vive Kielce
- 2020–: Wybrzeże Gdańsk
National team
Years	Team	Apps	(Gls)
2004–2017	Poland	133	(271)
Medal record
World Championship
Silver medal – second place	2007 Germany

Mateusz Jachlewski (born 27 December 1984) is a Polish handball player for Wybrzeże Gdańsk.

== Career ==
He received a silver medal with the Polish team at the 2007 World Men's Handball Championship. He participated at the 2008 Summer Olympics, where Poland finished fifth.
