= Aleksandr Pyshkin =

Russian handball player (born 1987)

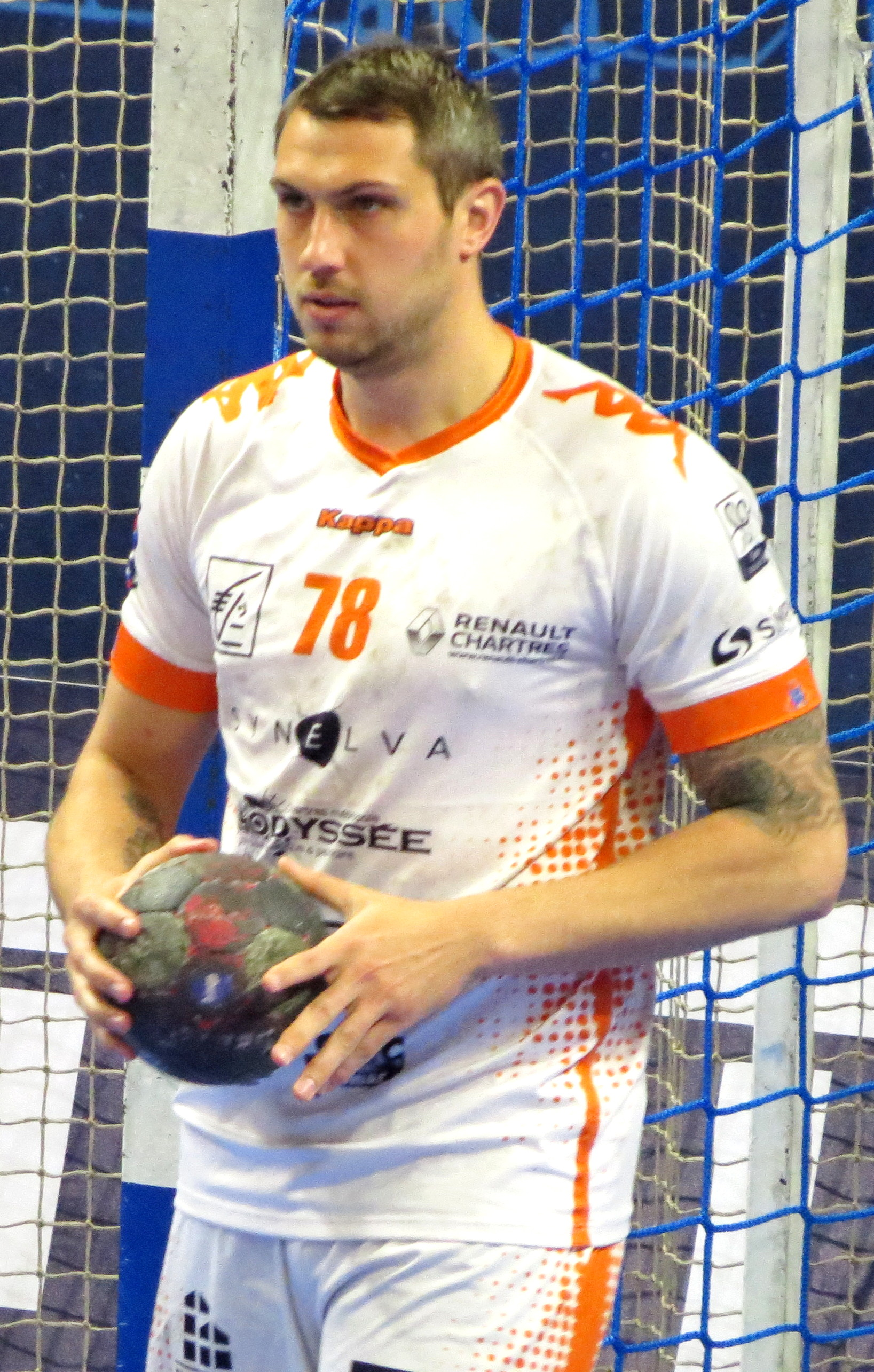

Personal information
- Full name: Aleksandr Olegovich Pyshkin
- Nationality: Russian
- Born: 13 April 1987 (age 39) Saint Petersburg, Russia
- Height: 1.97 m (6 ft 6 in)

Sport
- Sport: Handball
- Position: Pivot
- Current club: St. Petersburg HC
- Number: 13

Senior clubs
- Years: Team
- –2015: HC Neva
- 2015–2016: Chartres MHB 28
- 2016–2017: Tremblay-en-France Handball
- 2017–2020: Handball Tirol
- 2020–2022: HC Akbusat
- 2022–: Sungul Snezhinsk
National team
Years	Team	Apps	(Gls)
–	Russia	11	(4)

Aleksandr Olegovich Pyshkin (Russian: Александр Олегович Пышкин, born 13 April 1987) is a Russian handball player for St. Petersburg HC and the Russian national team.
