= Uroš Mitrović =

Serbian handball player (born 1984)

Personal information
- Full name: Uroš Mitrović
- Nationality: Serbian
- Born: 24 January 1984 (age 42) Belgrade, SFR Yugoslavia
- Height: 1.90 m (6 ft 3 in)

Sport
- Sport: Handball
- Position: Centre back
- Current club: Dinamo Pančevo
- Number: 35

Youth career
- Years: Team
- –: Partizan

Senior clubs
- Years: Team
- 2002–2007: Partizan
- 2007–2009: Pilotes Posada
- 2009–2012: Créteil
- 2012–2013: Partizan
- 2013–2019: BSV Bern
- 2019–: Dinamo Pančevo
National team
- Years: Team
- 2009–2018: Serbia

Uroš Mitrović (Serbian Cyrillic: Урош Митровић; born 24 January 1984) is a Serbian handball player for Partizan.

== Career ==
Mitrović started out at Partizan and played for five seasons with the club (2002–2007). He then spent five years abroad in Spain (Pilotes Posada) and France (Créteil), before returning to Partizan.

At international level, Mitrović represented Serbia at the 2013 World Men's Handball Championship and 2014 European Men's Handball Championship.

== Honours ==
Partizan

- Handball League of Serbia and Montenegro: 2002–03
- Serbian Handball Cup: 2006–07, 2012–13
- Serbian Handball Super Cup: 2012
