= Laurențiu Toma =

Romanian handball player

Laurenţiu Toma
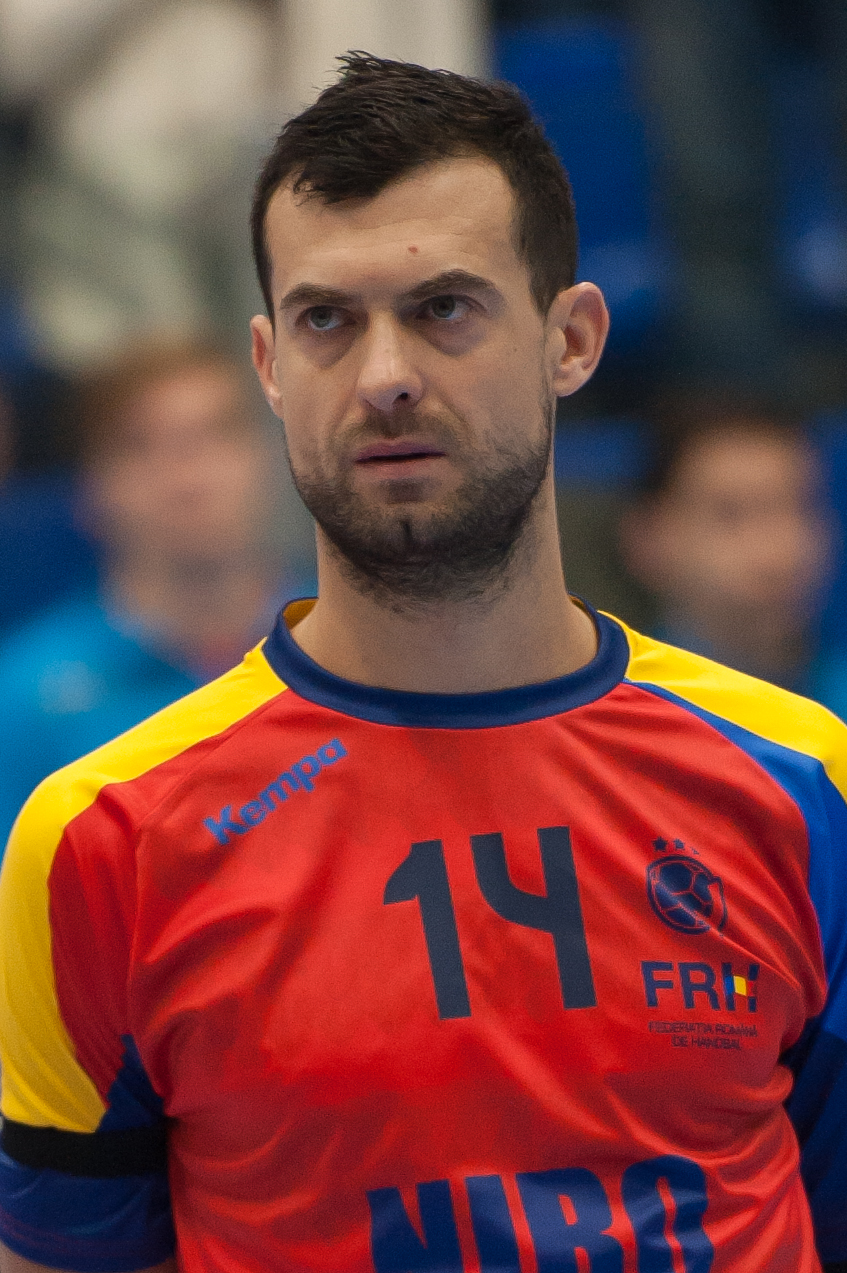

Personal information
- Nationality: Romanian
- Born: 28 June 1981 (age 45) Ploiești, Romania
- Height: 1.94 m (6 ft 4 in)

Sport
- Sport: Handball
- Position: Right Wing
- Number: 14

Senior clubs
- Years: Team
- 2001-2015: HCM Constanța
- 2015-2020: HC Dobrogea Sud Constanța
National team
Years	Team	Apps	(Gls)
–	Romania	133	(339)
- Updated on 20 June 2012

Laurenţiu Toma (born 29 April 1984 in Ploiești) is a Romanian retired handballer who played for HC Dobrogea Sud Constanța and the Romanian national team.

He ranked third in the 2009–10 EHF Champions League's top goalscorers list.

For his services to the team and the city, and his exemplary sportsmanship conduct, Toma was made honorary citizen of Constanța in 2010.

== Achievements ==
- Liga Națională:
  - Winner: 2004, 2006, 2007, 2009, 2010, 2011, 2012
- Cupa României:
  - Winner: 2006, 2011, 2012
- EHF Cup Winners' Cup:
  - Semifinalist: 2006
  - Quarterfinalist: 2007, 2009
- EHF Challenge Cup:
  - Semifinalist: 2004

== Individual awards ==
- Romanian Handballer of the Year: 2009
